= Storm =

Disturbed state of an astronomical body's atmosphere

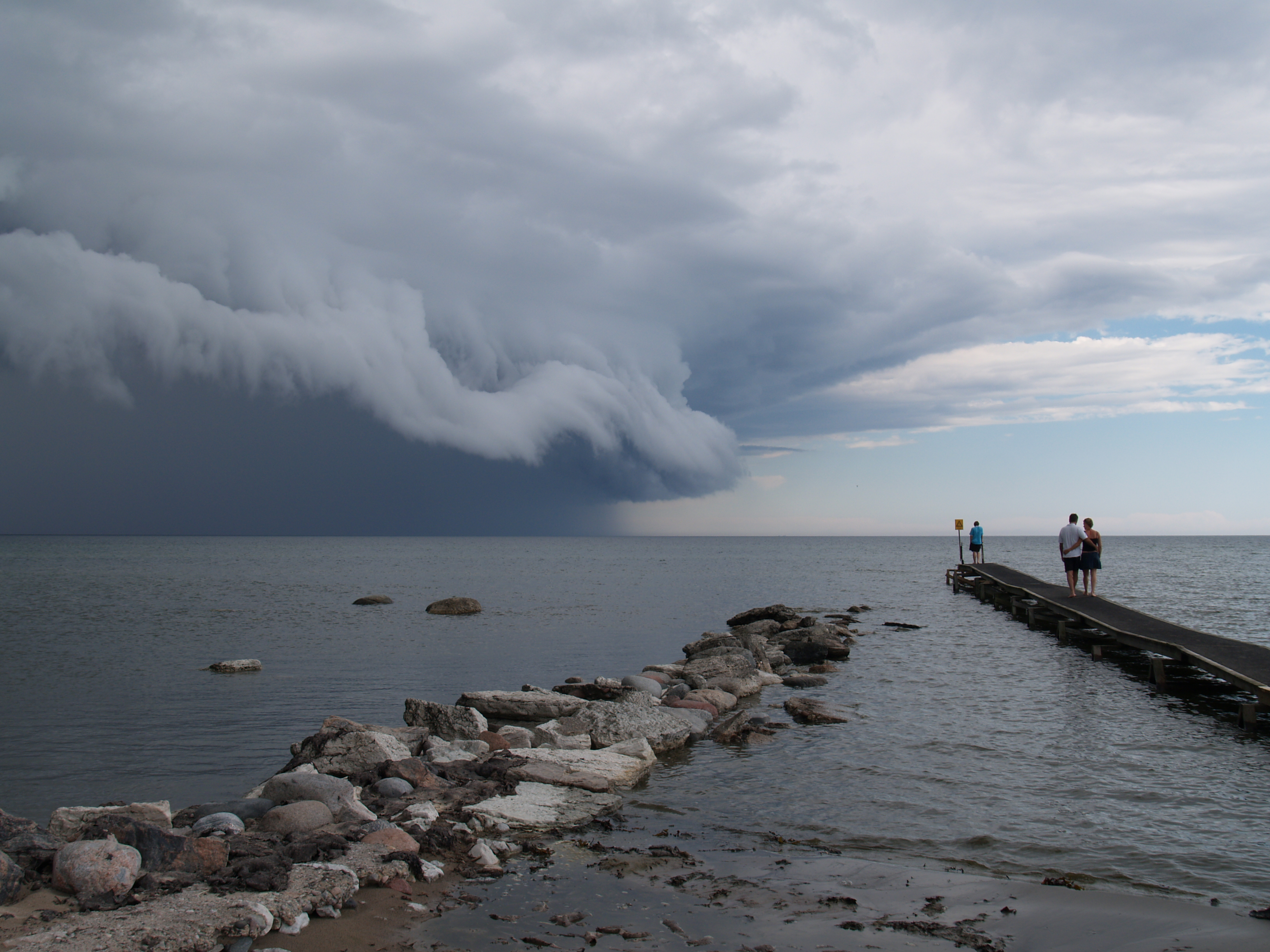
A storm seen at the Baltic Sea near the island of Öland, Sweden.

A storm is any disturbed state of the natural environment or the atmosphere of an astronomical body. It may be marked by significant disruptions to normal conditions such as strong wind, tornadoes, hail, thunder and lightning (a thunderstorm), heavy precipitation (snowstorm, rainstorm), heavy freezing rain (ice storm), strong winds (tropical cyclone, windstorm), wind transporting some substance through the atmosphere such as in a dust storm, among other forms of severe weather.

Storms have the potential to harm lives and property via storm surge, heavy rain or snow causing flooding or road impassibility, lightning, wildfires, and vertical and horizontal wind shear. Systems with significant rainfall and duration help alleviate drought in places they move through. Heavy snowfall can allow special recreational activities to take place which would not be possible otherwise, such as skiing and snowmobiling.

The English word comes from Proto-Germanic sturmaz meaning "noise, tumult"; a synonym is tempest, of French origin.

Storms are created when a center of low pressure develops with the system of high pressure surrounding it. This combination of opposing forces can create winds and result in the formation of storm clouds such as cumulonimbus. Small localized areas of low pressure can form from hot air rising off hot ground, resulting in smaller disturbances such as dust devils and whirlwinds.

== Types ==
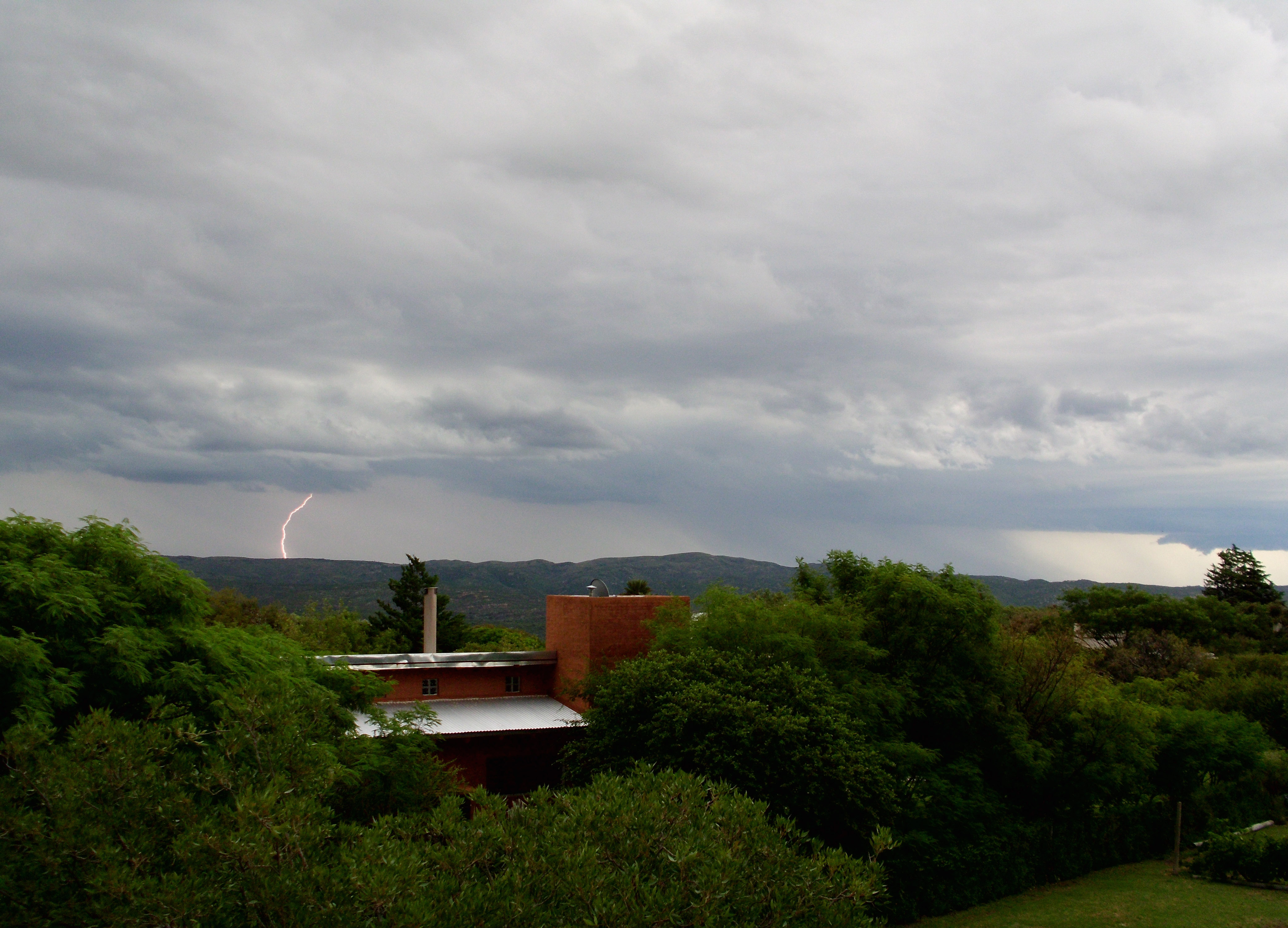
Classic summer thunderstorm with lightning in Sierras de Córdoba, Argentina.

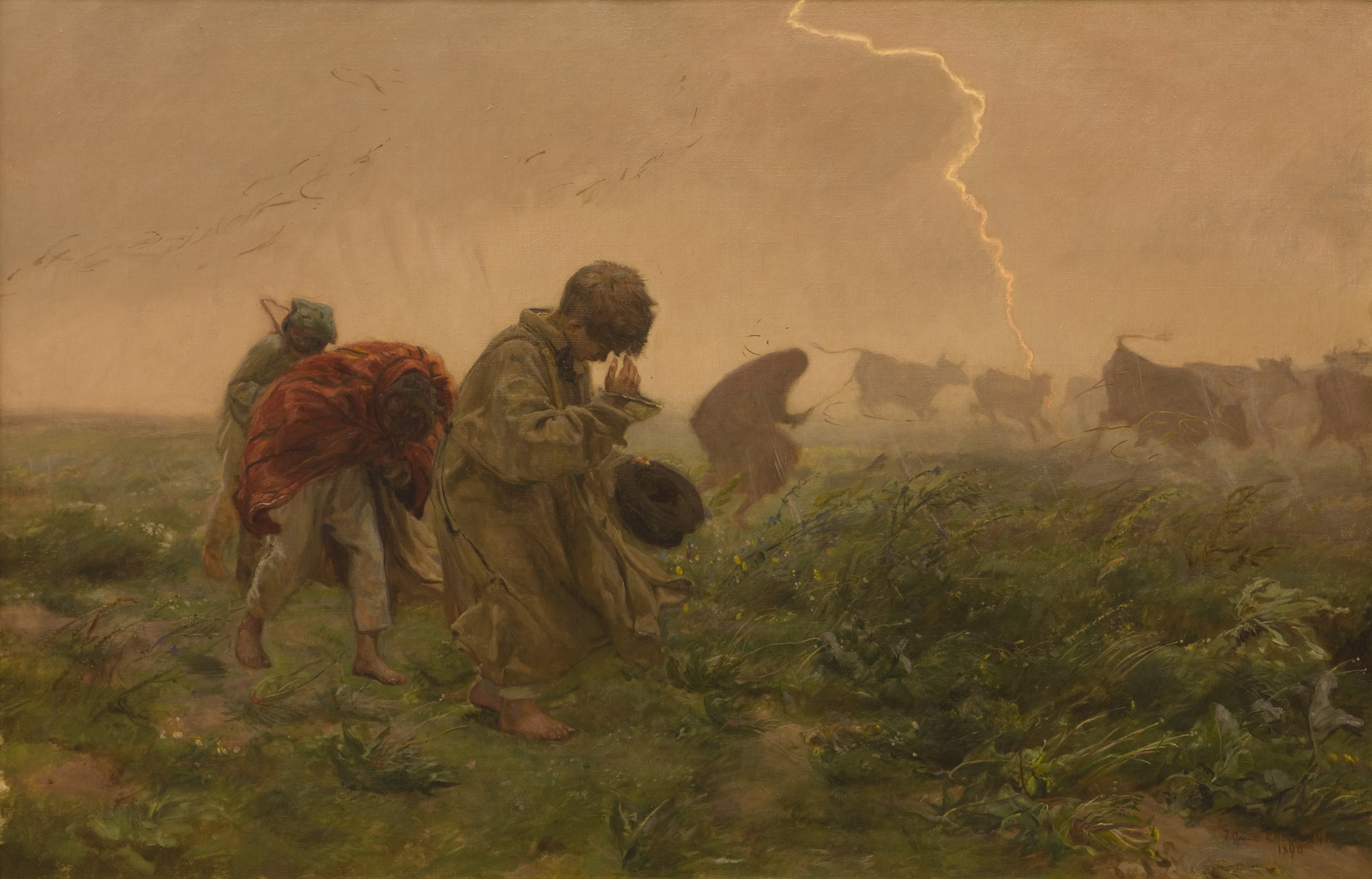
Classic summer storm in the 19th-century Polish countryside – picture by Józef Chełmoński, 1896, 107 x 163 cm (42.1 x 64.1 in), National Museum in Kraków.

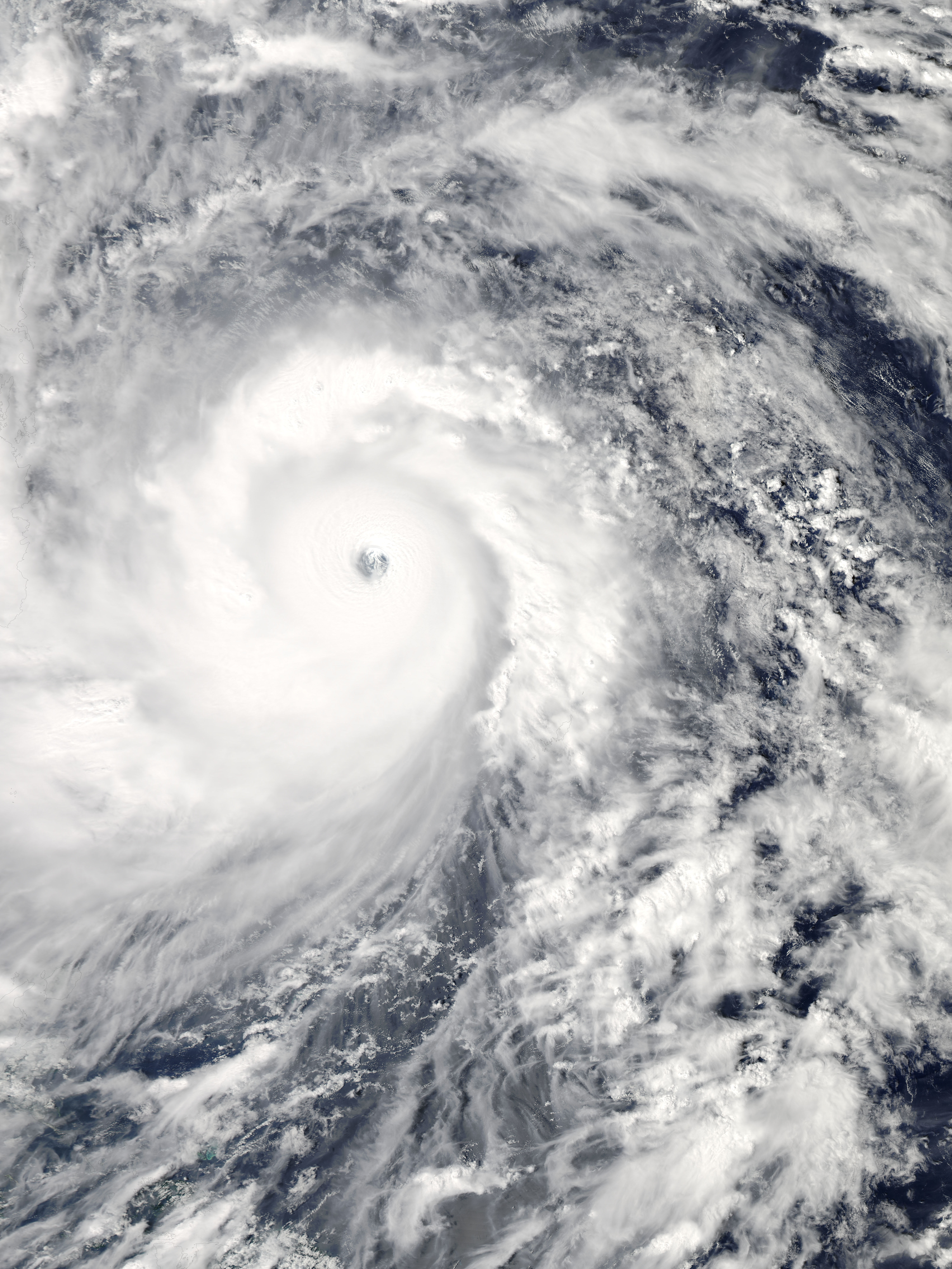
Typhoon Haiyan, a massive tropical cyclone that struck the Philippines in late 2013.

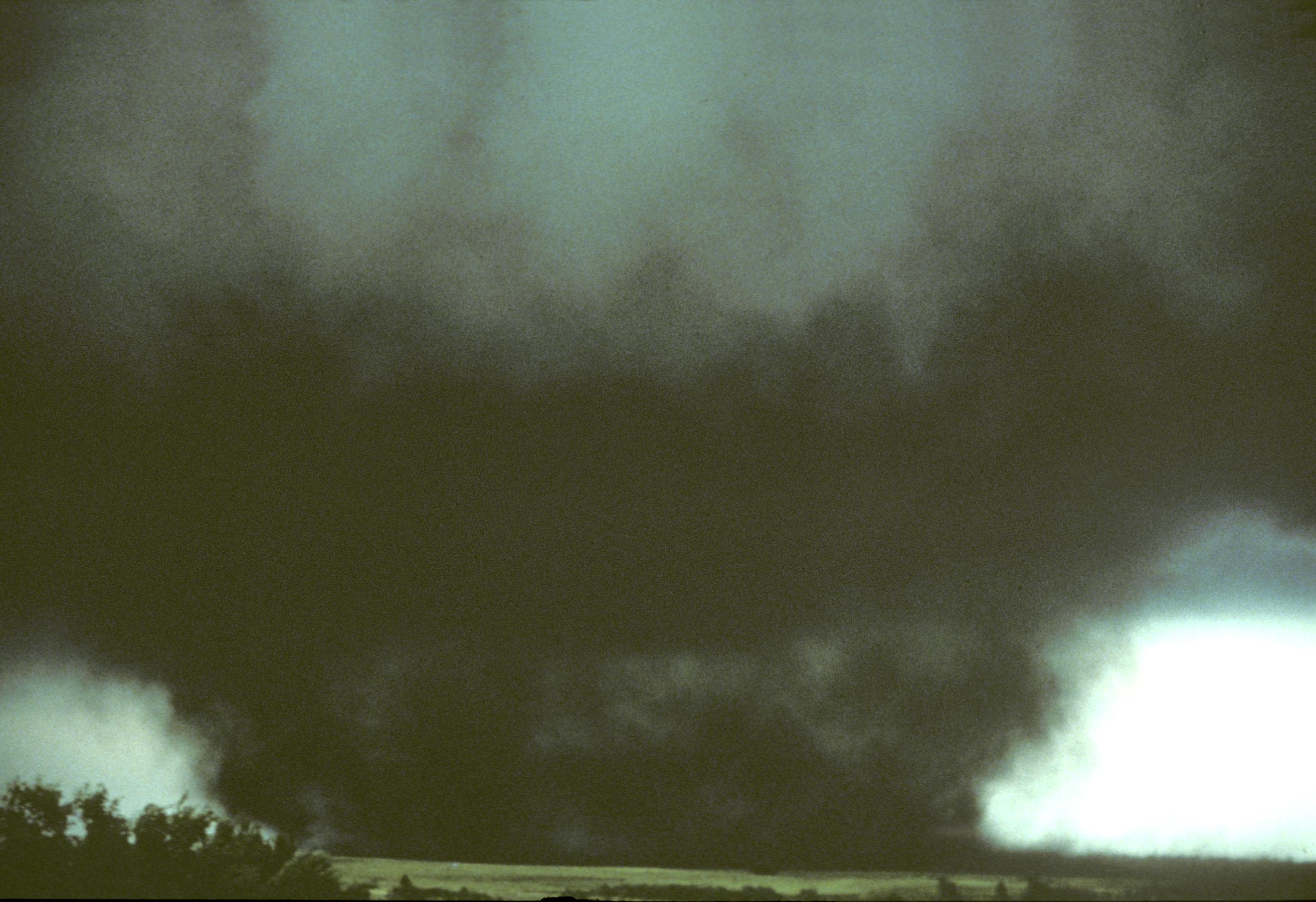
A tornado in Binger, Oklahoma during the 1981 outbreak.

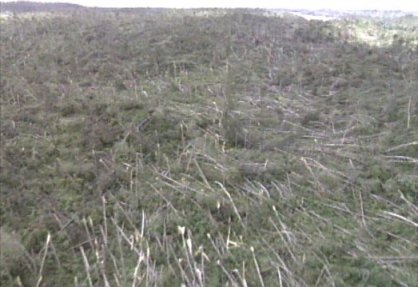
Trees felled by downbursts in the Boundary Waters – Canadian derecho of 1999.

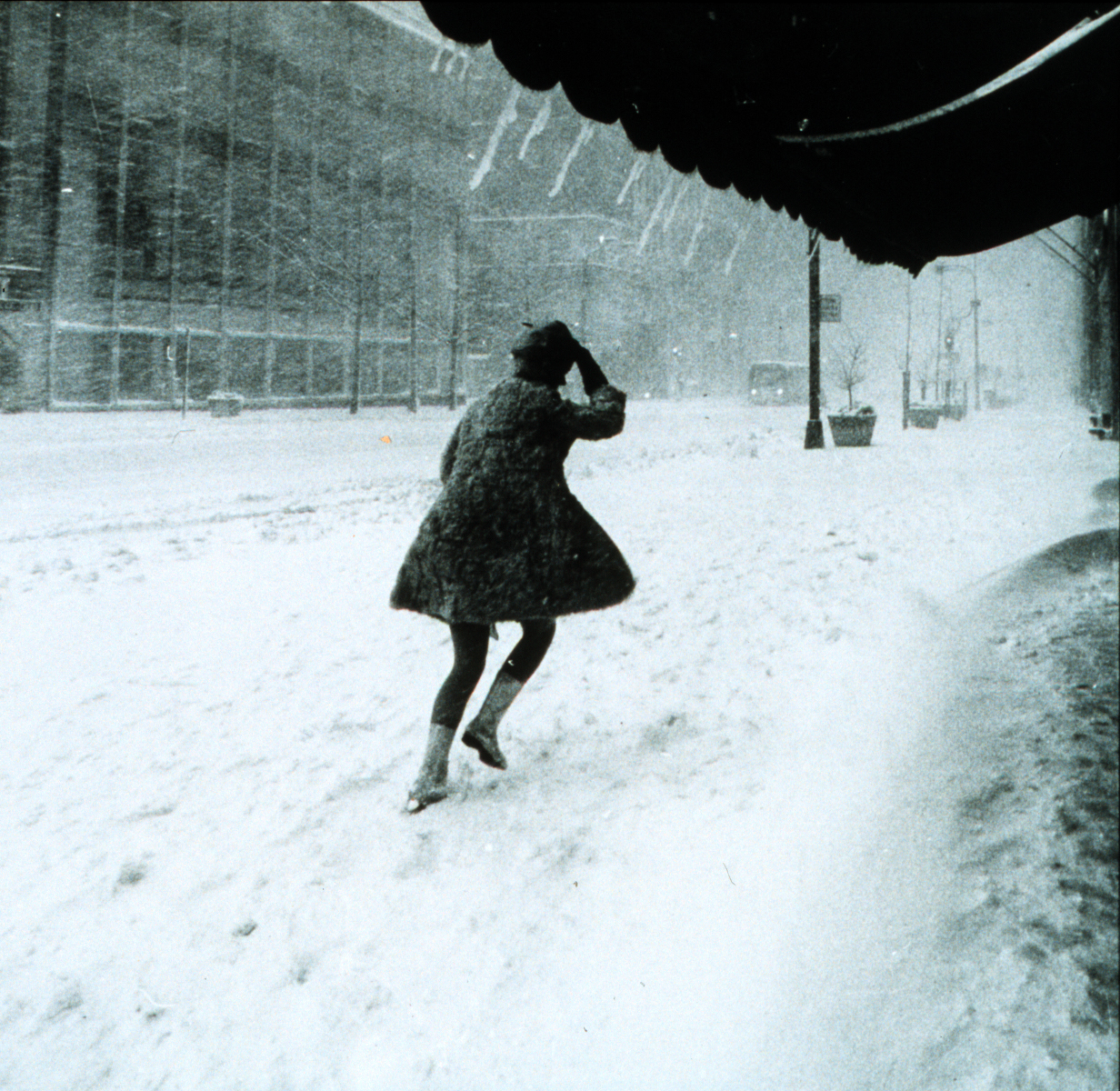
Snow storm in New York City.

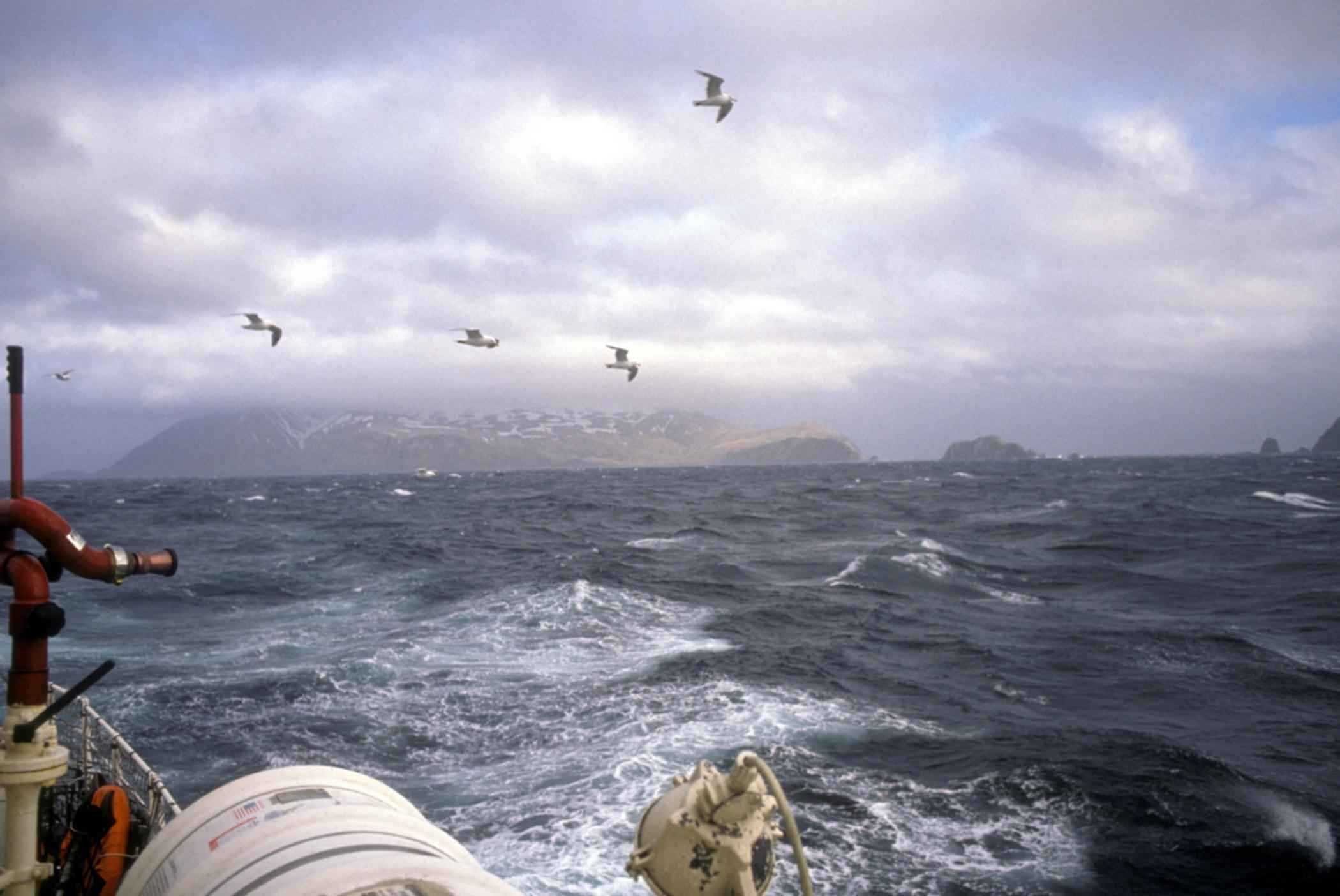
Boat in a storm at sea

There are many varieties and names for storms:

- Blizzard – There are varying definitions for blizzards, both over time and by location. In general, a blizzard is accompanied by gale-force winds, heavy snow (accumulating at a rate of at least 5 centimeters (2 in) per hour), and very cold conditions (below approximately −10 degrees Celsius or 14 F). Lately, the temperature criterion has fallen out of the definition across the United States.
- Bomb cyclone – A rapid deepening of a mid-latitude cyclonic low-pressure area, typically occurring over the ocean, but can occur over land. The winds experienced during these storms can be as powerful as that of a typhoon or hurricane.
- Coastal storm – Large wind waves and/or storm surge that strike the coastal zone. Their impacts include coastal erosion and coastal flooding.
- Derecho – A derecho is a widespread, long-lived, straight-line wind storm that is associated with a land-based, fast-moving group of severe thunderstorms.
- Dust devil – A small, localized updraft of rising air.
- Dust storm – A situation in which winds pick up large quantities of sand or soil, greatly reducing visibility.
- Firestorm – Firestorms are conflagrations which attain such intensity that they create and sustain their own wind systems. It is most commonly a natural phenomenon, created during some of the largest bush fires, forest fires, and wildfires. The Peshtigo Fire is one example of a firestorm. Firestorms can also be deliberate effects of targeted explosives, such as occurred as a result of the aerial bombings of Dresden. Nuclear detonations generate firestorms if high winds are not present.
- Gale – An extratropical storm with sustained winds between 34 and 48 knots (39–55 mph or 63–90 km/h).
- Hailstorm – A type of storm that precipitates round chunks of ice. Hailstorms usually occur during regular thunderstorms. While most of the hail that precipitates from the clouds is fairly small and virtually harmless, there are occasional occurrences of hail greater than 2 inches (5 cm) in diameter that can cause much damage and injuries.
- Ice storm – Ice storms are one of the most dangerous forms of winter storms. When surface temperatures are below freezing, but a thick layer of above-freezing air remains aloft, rain can fall into the freezing layer and freeze upon impact into a glaze of ice. In general, 8 millimetres (0.31 in) of accumulation is all that is required, especially in combination with breezy conditions, to start downing power lines as well as tree limbs. Ice storms also make unheated road surfaces too slick to drive upon. Ice storms can vary in time range from hours to days and can cripple small towns and large metropolitan cities alike.
- Microburst – A very powerful windstorm produced during a thunderstorm that only lasts a few minutes.
- Ocean Storm or sea storm – Storm conditions out at sea are defined as having sustained winds of 48 knots (55 mph or 90 km/h) or greater. Usually just referred to as a storm, these systems can sink vessels of all types and sizes.
- Nor'westers – A powerful storm coming from North-western direction, associated with heavy gusts, hail and thunderstorms. Usually occurs in Eastern India and Bangladesh in the late Spring and early Summer.
- Snowstorm – A heavy fall of snow accumulating at a rate of more than 5 centimeters (2 in) per hour that lasts several hours. Snow storms, especially ones with a high liquid equivalent and breezy conditions, can down tree limbs, cut off power connections and paralyze travel over large regions.
- Squall – Sudden onset of wind increase of at least 16 knots (30 km/h) or greater sustained for at least one minute.
- Thunderstorm – A thunderstorm is a type of storm that generates both lightning and thunder. It is normally accompanied by heavy precipitation. Thunderstorms occur throughout the world, with the highest frequency in tropical rainforest regions where there are conditions of high humidity and temperature along with atmospheric instability. These storms occur when high levels of condensation form in a volume of unstable air that generates deep, rapid, upward motion in the atmosphere. The heat energy creates powerful rising air currents that swirl upwards to the tropopause. Cool descending air currents produce strong downdraughts below the storm. After the storm has spent its energy, the rising currents die away and downdraughts break up the cloud. Individual storm clouds can measure 2–10 km across.
- Tornado – A tornado is a violent, destructive whirlwind storm occurring on land. Usually its appearance is that of a dark, funnel-shaped cloud. Often tornadoes are preceded by or associated with thunderstorms and a wall cloud. They are often called the most destructive of storms, and while they form all over the planet, the interior of the United States is the most prone area, especially throughout Tornado Alley.
- Tropical cyclone – A tropical cyclone is a storm system with a closed circulation around a centre of low pressure, fueled by the heat released when moist air rises and condenses. The name underscores its origin in the tropics and their cyclonic nature. Tropical cyclones are distinguished from other cyclonic storms such as nor'easters and polar lows by the heat mechanism that fuels them, which makes them "warm core" storm systems. Tropical cyclones form in the oceans if the conditions in the area are favorable, and depending on their strength and location, there are various terms by which they are called, such as tropical depression, tropical storm, hurricane and typhoon.
- Wind storm – A storm marked by high wind with little or no precipitation. Windstorm damage often opens the door for massive amounts of water and debris to cause further damage to a structure. European windstorms and derechos are two type of windstorms. High wind is also the cause of sandstorms in dry climates.

== Classification ==
A strict meteorological definition of a terrestrial storm is a wind measuring 10 or higher on the Beaufort scale, meaning a wind speed of 24.5 m/s (89 km/h, 55 mph) or more; however, popular usage is not so restrictive. Storms can last anywhere from 12 to 200 hours, depending on season and geography. In North America, the east and northeast storms are noted for the most frequent repeatability and duration, especially during the cold period. Big terrestrial storms alter the oceanographic conditions that in turn may affect food abundance and distribution: strong currents, strong tides, increased siltation, change in water temperatures, overturn in the water column, etc.

== Extraterrestrial storms ==
The Great Red Spot on Jupiter

Storms do not only occur on Earth; other planetary bodies with a sufficient atmosphere (giant planets in particular) also undergo stormy weather. The Great Red Spot on Jupiter provides a well-known example. Though technically an anticyclone, with greater than hurricane wind speeds, it is larger than the Earth and has persisted for at least 340 years, having first been observed by astronomer Giovanni Domenico Cassini. Neptune also had its own lesser-known Great Dark Spot.

In September 1994, the Hubble Space Telescope – using Wide Field Planetary Camera 2 – imaged storms on Saturn generated by upwelling of warmer air, similar to a terrestrial thunderhead. The storm was observed earlier in September 1990 and acquired the name Dragon Storm.

The dust storms of Mars vary in size, but can often cover the entire planet. They tend to occur when Mars comes closest to the Sun, and have been shown to increase the global temperature.

One particularly large Martian storm was exhaustively studied up close due to coincidental timing. When the first spacecraft to successfully orbit another planet, Mariner 9, arrived and successfully orbited Mars on 14 November 1971, planetary scientists were surprised to find the atmosphere was thick with a planet-wide robe of dust, the largest storm ever observed on Mars. The surface of the planet was totally obscured. Mariner 9's computer was reprogrammed from Earth to delay imaging of the surface for a couple of months until the dust settled, however, the surface-obscured images contributed much to the collection of Mars atmospheric and planetary surface science.

Two extrasolar planets are known to have storms: HD 209458 b and HD 80606 b. The former's storm was discovered on 23 June 2010, and measured at 6,200 km/h (3,900 mph), while the latter produces winds of 17,700 km/h (11,000 mph) across the surface. The spin of the planet then creates giant swirling shock-wave storms that carry the heat aloft.

== Effects on human society ==
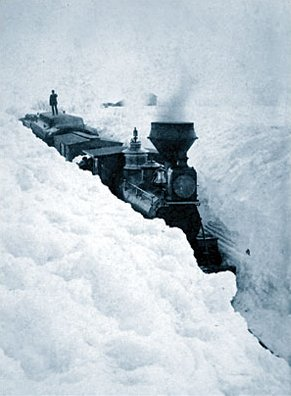
A snow blockade in southern Minnesota in 1881

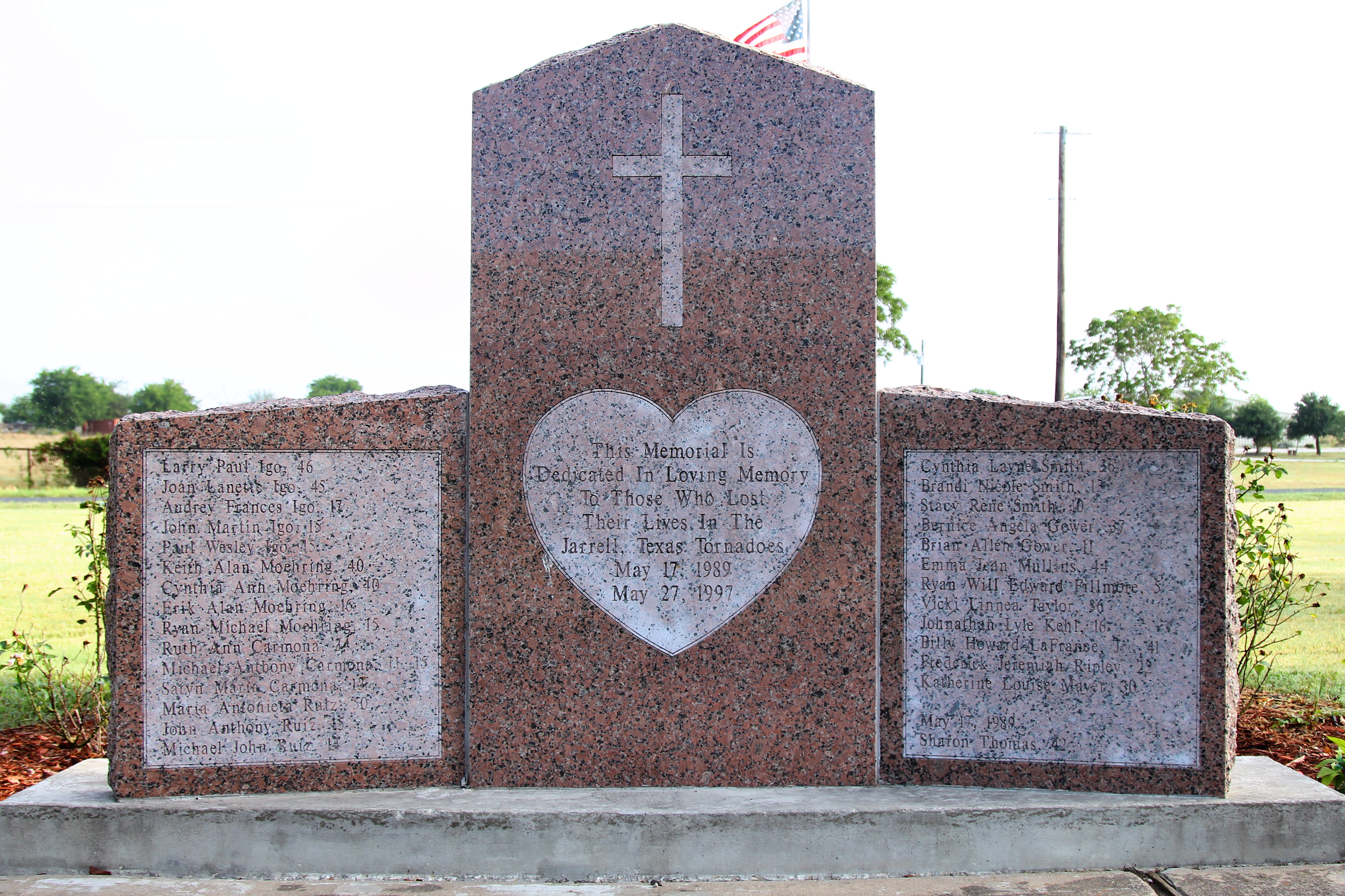
A memorial to the victims of the 1997 Jarrell tornado

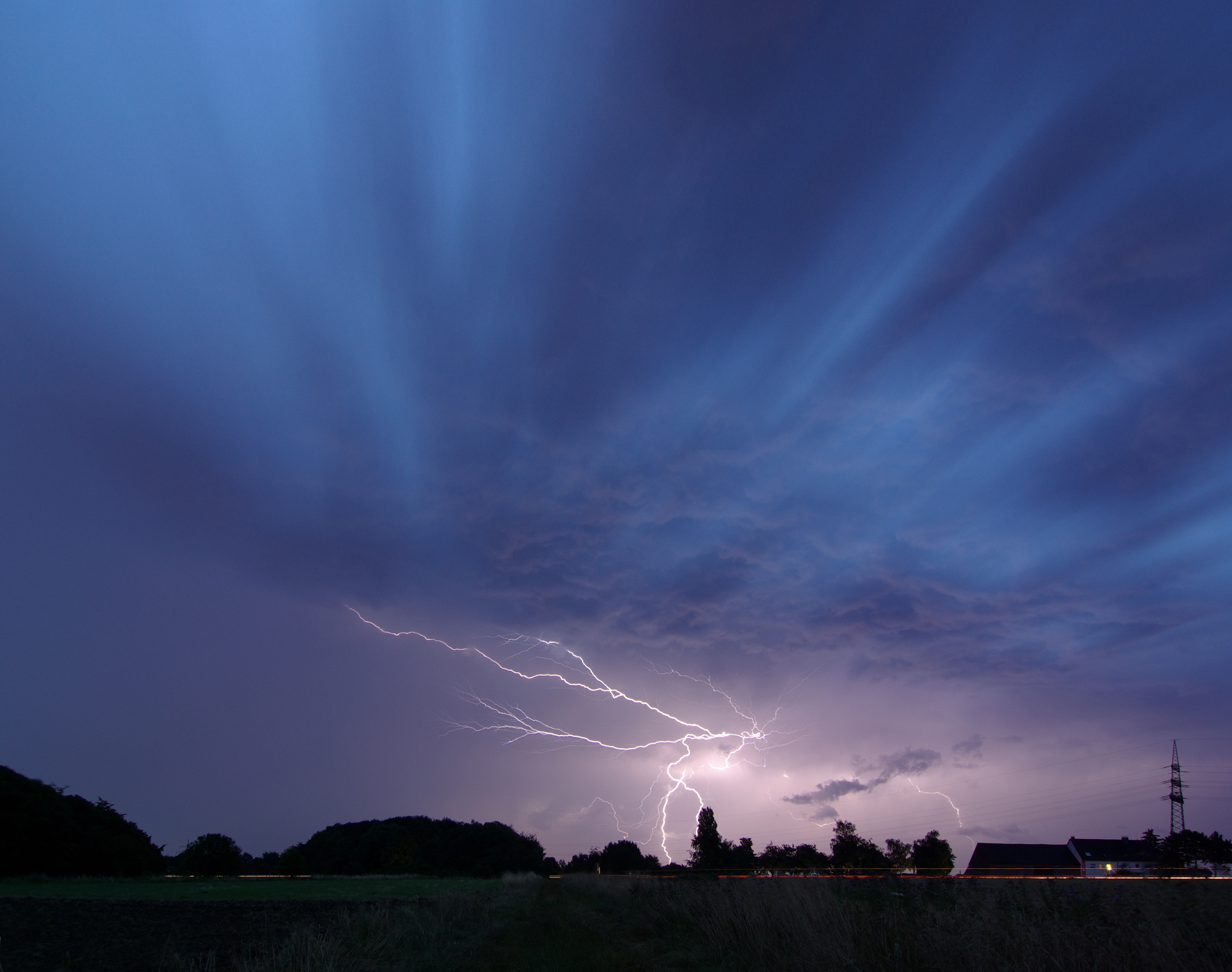
A return stroke, cloud-to-ground lightning strike during a thunderstorm.

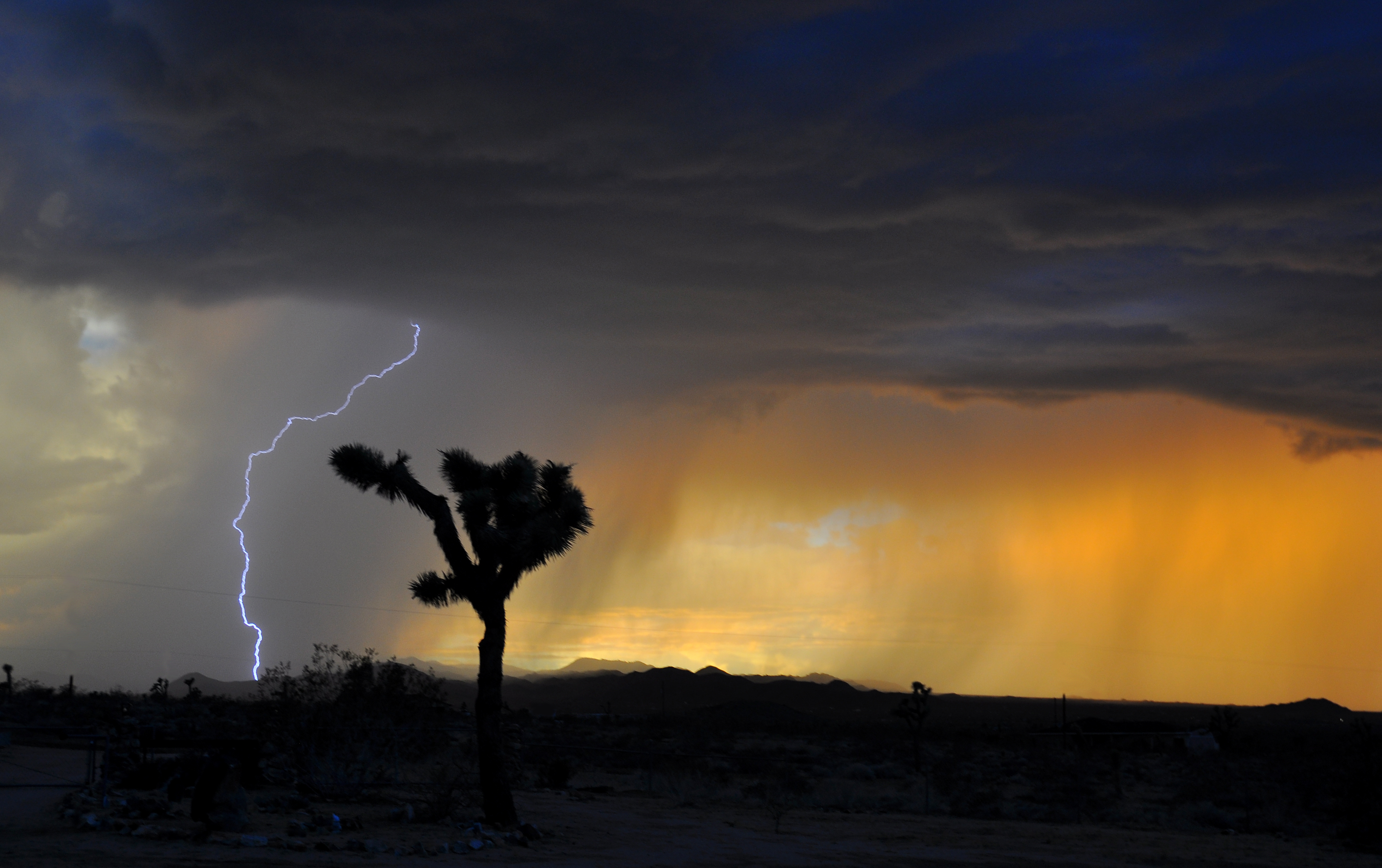
A lightning strike during a desert storm at twilight

Shipwrecks are common with the passage of strong tropical cyclones. Such shipwrecks can change the course of history, as well as influence art and literature. A hurricane led to a victory of the Spanish over the French for control of Fort Caroline, and ultimately the Atlantic coast of North America, in 1565. Strong winds from any storm type can damage or destroy vehicles, buildings, bridges, and other outside objects, turning loose debris into deadly flying projectiles. In the United States, major hurricanes comprise just 21% of all landfalling tropical cyclones, but account for 83% of all damage. Tropical cyclones often knock out power to tens or hundreds of thousands of people, preventing vital communication and hampering rescue efforts. Tropical cyclones often destroy key bridges, overpasses, and roads, complicating efforts to transport food, clean water, and medicine to the areas that need it. Furthermore, the damage caused by tropical cyclones to buildings and dwellings can result in economic damage to a region, and to a diaspora of the population of the region.

It has been calculated by the Food and Agriculture Organization of the United Nations that storms had caused US$720 billion of damage between 1991 and 2023. These extreme weather events combine multiple destructive forces, including high winds that can flatten crops and destroy agricultural structures, torrential rainfall that can cause flooding, and soil erosion and hail that can devastate entire harvests within minutes. The concentration of storm-related losses reflects the specific vulnerability of agriculture to these intense, short-duration events that can cause widespread destruction across multiple agricultural sectors simultaneously.

The storm surge, or the increase in sea level due to the cyclone, is typically the worst effect from landfalling tropical cyclones, historically resulting in 90% of tropical cyclone deaths. The relatively quick surge in sea level can move miles/kilometers inland, flooding homes and cutting off escape routes. The storm surges and winds of hurricanes may be destructive to human-made structures, but they also stir up the waters of coastal estuaries, which are typically important fish breeding locales.

Cloud-to-ground lightning frequently occurs within the phenomena of thunderstorms and have numerous hazards towards landscapes and populations. One of the more significant hazards lightning can pose is the wildfires they are capable of igniting. Under a regime of low precipitation (LP) thunderstorms, where little precipitation is present, rainfall cannot prevent fires from starting when vegetation is dry as lightning produces a concentrated amount of extreme heat. Wildfires can devastate vegetation and the biodiversity of an ecosystem. Wildfires that occur close to urban environments can inflict damages upon infrastructures, buildings, crops, and provide risks to explosions, should the flames be exposed to gas pipes. Direct damage caused by lightning strikes occurs on occasion. In areas with a high frequency for cloud-to-ground lightning, like Florida, lightning causes several fatalities per year, most commonly to people working outside.

Precipitation with low potential of hydrogen levels (pH), otherwise known as acid rain, is also a frequent risk produced by lightning. Distilled water, which contains no carbon dioxide, has a neutral pH of 7. Liquids with a pH less than 7 are acidic, and those with a pH greater than 7 are bases. "Clean" or unpolluted rain has a slightly acidic pH of about 5.2, because carbon dioxide and water in the air react together to form carbonic acid, a weak acid (pH 5.6 in distilled water), but unpolluted rain also contains other chemicals. Nitric oxide present during thunderstorm phenomena, caused by the splitting of nitrogen molecules, can result in the production of acid rain, if nitric oxide forms compounds with the water molecules in precipitation, thus creating acid rain. Acid rain can damage infrastructures containing calcite or other solid chemical compounds containing carbon. In ecosystems, acid rain can dissolve plant tissues of vegetations and increase acidification process in bodies of water and in soil, resulting in deaths of marine and terrestrial organisms.

Hail damage to roofs often goes unnoticed until further structural damage is seen, such as leaks or cracks. It is hardest to recognize hail damage on shingled roofs and flat roofs, but all roofs have their own hail damage detection problems. Metal roofs are fairly resistant to hail damage, but may accumulate cosmetic damage in the form of dents and damaged coatings. Hail is also a common nuisance to drivers of automobiles, severely denting the vehicle and cracking or even shattering windshields and windows. Rarely, massive hailstones have been known to cause concussions or fatal head trauma. Hailstorms have been the cause of costly and deadly events throughout history. One of the earliest recorded incidents occurred around the 9th century in Roopkund, Uttarakhand, India. The largest hailstone in terms of diameter and weight ever recorded in the United States fell on 23 July 2010, in Vivian, South Dakota in the United States; it measured 8 inches (20 cm) in diameter and 18.62 inches (47.3 cm) in circumference, weighing in at 1.93 pounds (0.88 kg). This broke the previous record for diameter set by a hailstone 7 inches (18 cm) diameter and 18.75 inches (47.6 cm) circumference which fell in Aurora, Nebraska in the United States on 22 June 2003, as well as the record for weight, set by a hailstone of 1.67 pounds (0.76 kg) that fell in Coffeyville, Kansas in 1970.

Various hazards, ranging from hail to lightning can affect outside technology facilities, such as antennas, satellite dishes, and towers. As a result, companies with outside facilities have begun installing such facilities underground, to reduce the risk of damage from storms.

Substantial snowfall can disrupt public infrastructure and services, slowing human activity even in regions that are accustomed to such weather. Air and ground transport may be greatly inhibited or shut down entirely. Populations living in snow-prone areas have developed various ways to travel across the snow, such as skis, snowshoes, and sleds pulled by horses, dogs, or other animals and later, snowmobiles. Basic utilities such as electricity, telephone lines, and gas supply can also fail. In addition, snow can make roads much harder to travel and vehicles attempting to use them can easily become stuck.

The combined effects can lead to a "snow day" on which gatherings such as school, work, or church are officially canceled. In areas that normally have very little or no snow, a snow day may occur when there is only light accumulation or even the threat of snowfall, since those areas are unprepared to handle any amount of snow. In some areas, such as some states in the United States, schools are given a yearly quota of snow days (or "calamity days"). Once the quota is exceeded, the snow days must be made up. In other states, all snow days must be made up. For example, schools may extend the remaining school days later into the afternoon, shorten spring break, or delay the start of summer vacation.

Accumulated snow is removed to make travel easier and safer, and to decrease the long-term effect of a heavy snowfall. This process uses shovels and snowplows, and is often assisted by sprinkling salt or other chloride-based chemicals, which reduce the melting temperature of snow. In some areas with abundant snowfall, such as Yamagata Prefecture, Japan, people harvest snow and store it surrounded by insulation in ice houses. This allows the snow to be used through the summer for refrigeration and air conditioning, which requires far less electricity than traditional cooling methods.

=== Agriculture ===
Economic loss in agriculture and non-agricultural sectors caused by storms compared to other hazard types.

Hail can cause serious damage, notably to automobiles, aircraft, skylights, glass-roofed structures, livestock, and most commonly, farmers' crops. Wheat, corn, soybeans, and tobacco are the most sensitive crops to hail damage. Hail is one of Canada's most expensive hazards. Snowfall can be beneficial to agriculture by serving as a thermal insulator, conserving the heat of the Earth and protecting crops from subfreezing weather. Some agricultural areas depend on an accumulation of snow during winter that will melt gradually in spring, providing water for crop growth. If it melts into water and refreezes upon sensitive crops, such as oranges, the resulting ice will protect the fruit from exposure to lower temperatures. Although tropical cyclones take an enormous toll in lives and personal property, they may be important factors in the precipitation regimes of places they affect and bring much-needed precipitation to otherwise dry regions. Hurricanes in the eastern north Pacific often supply moisture to the Southwestern United States and parts of Mexico. Japan receives over half of its rainfall from typhoons. Hurricane Camille averted drought conditions and ended water deficits along much of its path, though it also killed 259 people and caused $9.14 billion (2005 USD) in damage.

=== Aviation ===
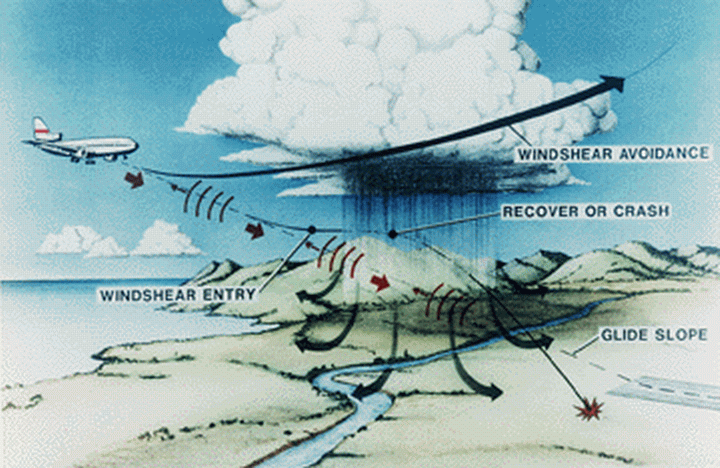
Effect of wind shear on aircraft trajectory. Merely correcting for the initial gust front can have dire consequences.

Hail is one of the most significant thunderstorm hazards to aircraft. When hail stones exceed 0.5 inches (13 mm) in diameter, planes can be seriously damaged within seconds. The hailstones accumulating on the ground can also be hazardous to landing aircraft. Strong wind outflow from thunderstorms causes rapid changes in the three-dimensional wind velocity just above ground level. Initially, this outflow causes a headwind that increases airspeed, which normally causes a pilot to reduce engine power if they are unaware of the wind shear. As the aircraft passes into the region of the downdraft, the localized headwind diminishes, reducing the aircraft's airspeed and increasing its sink rate. Then, when the aircraft passes through the other side of the downdraft, the headwind becomes a tailwind, reducing lift generated by the wings, and leaving the aircraft in a low-power, low-speed descent. This can lead to an accident if the aircraft is too low to effect a recovery before ground contact. As the result of the accidents in the 1970s and 1980s, in 1988 the U.S. Federal Aviation Administration mandated that all commercial aircraft have on-board wind shear detection systems by 1993. Between 1964 and 1985, wind shear directly caused or contributed to 26 major civil transport aircraft accidents in the U.S. that led to 620 deaths and 200 injuries. Since 1995, the number of major civil aircraft accidents caused by wind shear has dropped to approximately one every ten years, due to the mandated on-board detection as well as the addition of Doppler weather radar units on the ground. (NEXRAD)

=== Recreation ===
Many winter sports, such as skiing, snowboarding, snowmobiling, and snowshoeing depend upon snow. Where snow is scarce but the temperature is low enough, snow cannons may be used to produce an adequate amount for such sports. Children and adults can play on a sled or ride in a sleigh. Although a person's footsteps remain a visible lifeline within a snow-covered landscape, snow cover is considered a general danger to hiking since the snow obscures landmarks and makes the landscape itself appear uniform.

== Notable storms in art and culture ==
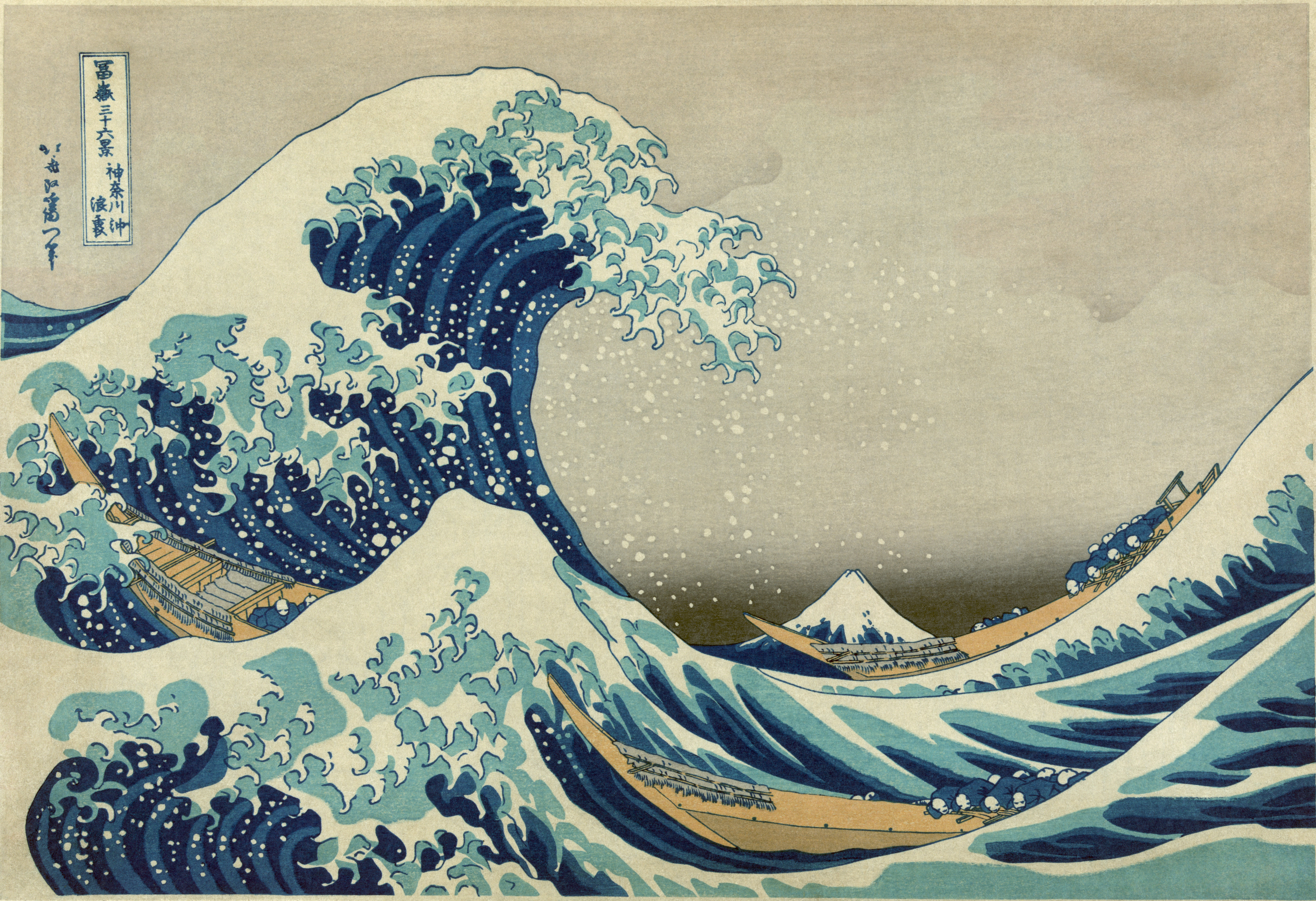
The Great Wave off Kanagawa, an 1831 ukiyo-e print by Hokusai

=== In mythology and literature ===
According to the Bible, a giant storm sent by God flooded the Earth. Noah and his family and the animals entered the Ark, and "the same day were all the fountains of the great deep broken up, and the windows of heaven were opened, and the rain was upon the earth forty days and forty nights." The flood covered even the highest mountains to a depth of more than twenty feet, and all creatures died; only Noah and those with him on the Ark were left alive. In the New Testament, Jesus Christ is recorded to have calmed a storm on the Sea of Galilee.

The Gilgamesh flood myth is a deluge story in the Epic of Gilgamesh.

In Greek mythology Aeolus, keeper of storm-winds, squalls and tempests.

The Sea Venture was wrecked near Bermuda in 1609, which led to the colonization of Bermuda and provided the inspiration for Shakespeare's play The Tempest (1611). Specifically, Sir Thomas Gates, future governor of Virginia, was on his way to England from Jamestown, Virginia. On Saint James Day, while he was between Cuba and the Bahamas, a hurricane raged for nearly two days. Though one of the small vessels in the fleet sank to the bottom of the Florida Straits, seven of the remaining vessels reached Virginia within several days after the storm. The flagship of the fleet, known as Sea Adventure, disappeared and was presumed lost. A small bit of fortune befell the ship and her crew when they made landfall on Bermuda. The vessel was damaged on a surrounding coral reef, but all aboard survived for nearly a year on the island. The British colonists claimed the island and quickly settled Bermuda. In May 1610, they set forth for Jamestown, this time arriving at their destination.

The children's novel The Wonderful Wizard of Oz, written by L. Frank Baum and illustrated by W. W. Denslow, chronicles the adventures of a young girl named Dorothy Gale in the Land of Oz, after being swept away from her Kansas farm home by a tornado. The story was originally published by the George M. Hill Company in Chicago on 17 May 1900, and has since been reprinted numerous times, most often under the name The Wizard of Oz, and adapted for use in other media. Thanks in part to the 1939 MGM movie, it is one of the best-known stories in American popular culture and has been widely translated. Its initial success, and the success of the popular 1902 Broadway musical which Baum adapted from his original story, led to Baum's writing thirteen more Oz books.

Hollywood director King Vidor (8 February 1894 – 1 November 1982) survived the Galveston Hurricane of 1900 as a boy. Based on that experience, he published a fictionalized account of that cyclone, titled "Southern Storm", for the May 1935 issue of Esquire magazine. Erik Larson excerpts a passage from that article in his 2005 book, Isaac's Storm:

I remember now that it seemed as if we were in a bowl looking up toward the level of the sea. As we stood there in the sandy street, my mother and I, I wanted to take my mother's hand and hurry her away. I felt as if the sea was going to break over the edge of the bowl and come puring down upon us.

Numerous other accounts of the Galveston Hurricane of 1900 have been made in print and in film. Larson cites many of them in Isaac's Storm, which centrally features that storm, as well as chronicles the creation of the Weather Bureau (which came to known as the National Weather Service) and that agency's fateful rivalry with the weather service in Cuba, and a number of other major storms, such as those which ravaged Indianola, Texas in 1875 and 1886.

The Great Storm of 1987 is key in an important scene near the end of Possession: A Romance, the bestselling and Booker Prize-winning novel by A. S. Byatt. The Great Storm of 1987 occurred on the night of 15–16 October 1987, when an unusually strong weather system caused winds to hit much of southern England and northern France. It was the worst storm to hit England since the Great Storm of 1703 (284 years earlier) and was responsible for the deaths of at least 22 people in England and France combined (18 in England, at least four in France).

Hurricane Katrina (2005) has been featured in a number of works of fiction.

=== In fine art ===
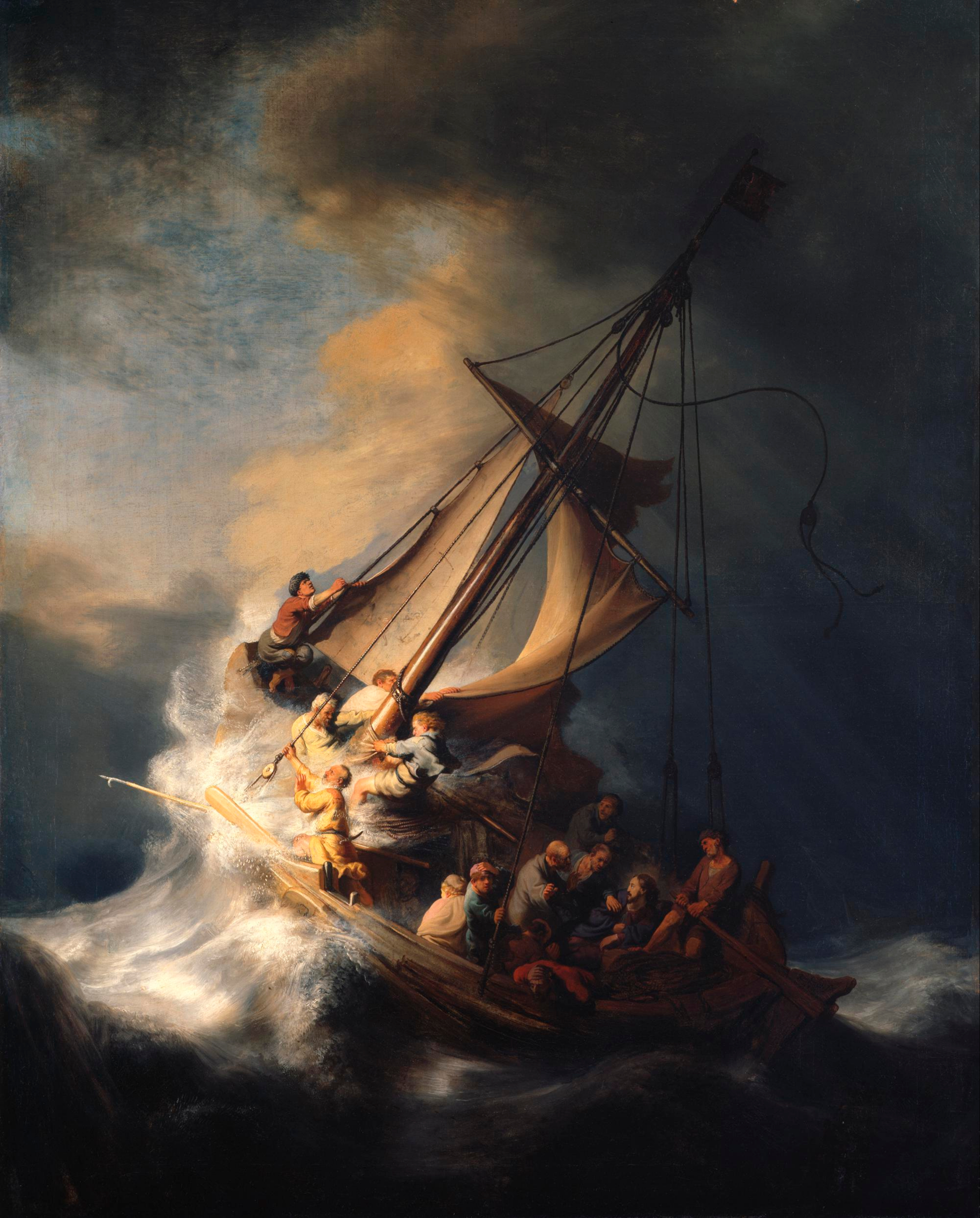
Rembrandt's 1633 The Storm on the Sea of Galilee.

The Romantic seascape painters J. M. W. Turner and Ivan Aivazovsky created some of the most lasting impressions of the sublime and stormy seas that are firmly imprinted on the popular mind. Turner's representations of powerful natural forces reinvented the traditional seascape during the first half of the nineteenth century.

Upon his travels to Holland, he took note of the familiar large rolling waves of the English seashore transforming into the sharper, choppy waves of a Dutch storm. A characteristic example of Turner's dramatic seascape is The Slave Ship of 1840. Aivazovsky left several thousand turbulent canvases in which he increasingly eliminated human figures and historical background to focus on such essential elements as light, sea, and sky. His grandiose Ninth Wave (1850) is an ode to human daring in the face of the elements.

=== In motion pictures ===
The 1926 silent film The Johnstown Flood features the Great Flood of 1889 in Johnstown, Pennsylvania. The flood, caused by the catastrophic failure of the South Fork Dam after days of extremely heavy rainfall, prompted the first major disaster relief effort by the American Red Cross, directed by Clara Barton. The Johnstown Flood was depicted in numerous other media (both fictional and in non-fiction), as well.

Warner Bros.' 2000 dramatic disaster film The Perfect Storm, directed by Wolfgang Petersen, is an adaptation of Sebastian Junger's 1997 non-fiction book of the same title. The book and film feature the crew of the Andrea Gail, which got caught in the Perfect Storm of 1991. The 1991 Perfect Storm, also known as the Halloween Nor'easter of 1991, was a nor'easter that absorbed Hurricane Grace and ultimately evolved into a small hurricane late in its life cycle.

=== In music ===
Storms have also been portrayed in many works of music. Examples of storm music include Vivaldi's Four Seasons violin concerto RV 315 (Summer) (third movement: Presto), Beethoven's Pastoral Symphony (the fourth movement), a scene in Act II of Rossini's opera The Barber of Seville, the third act of Giuseppe Verdi's Rigoletto, and the fifth (Cloudburst) movement of Ferde Grofé's Grand Canyon Suite.

== Gallery ==
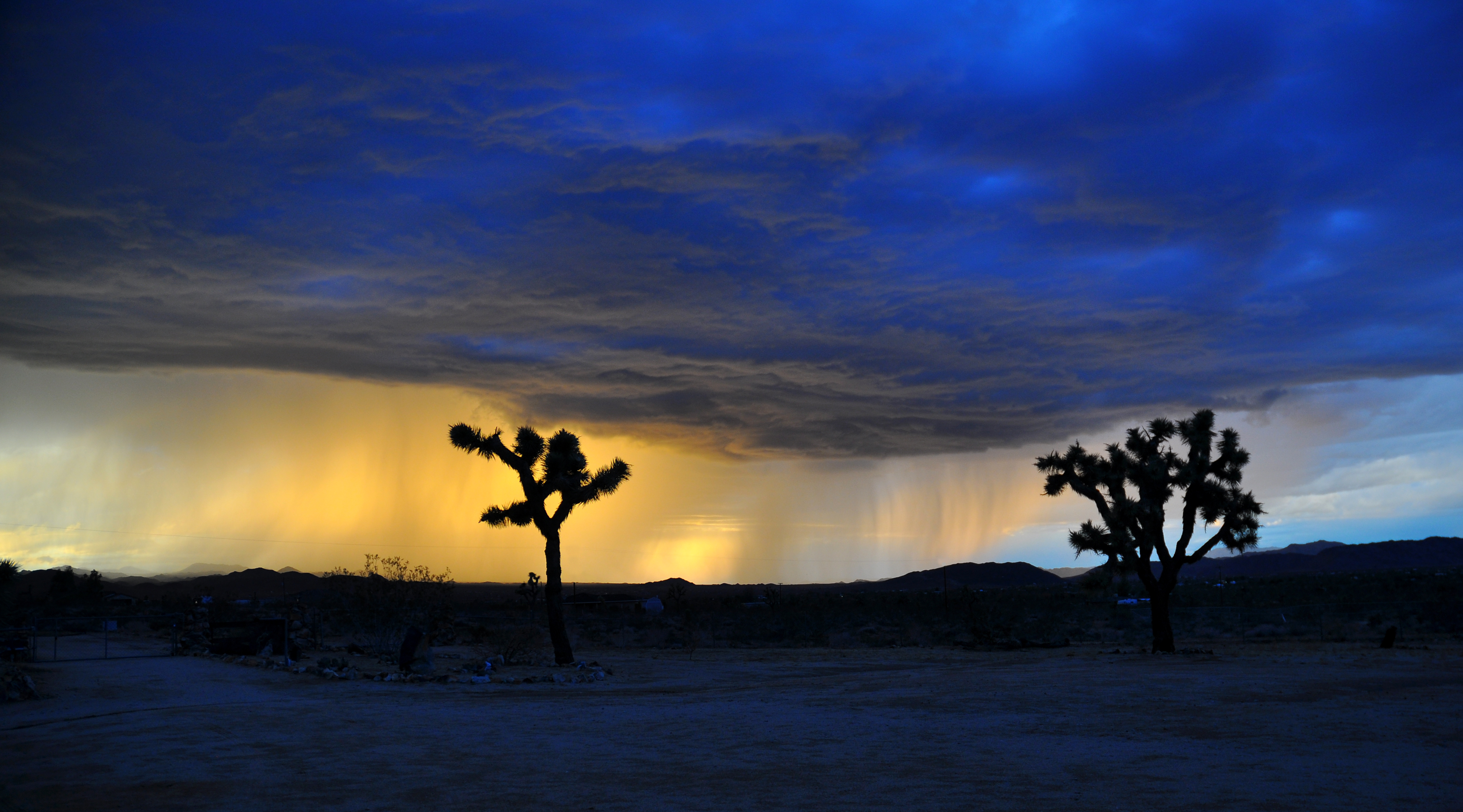
Lightning within the cloud causes the entire blanket to illuminate.

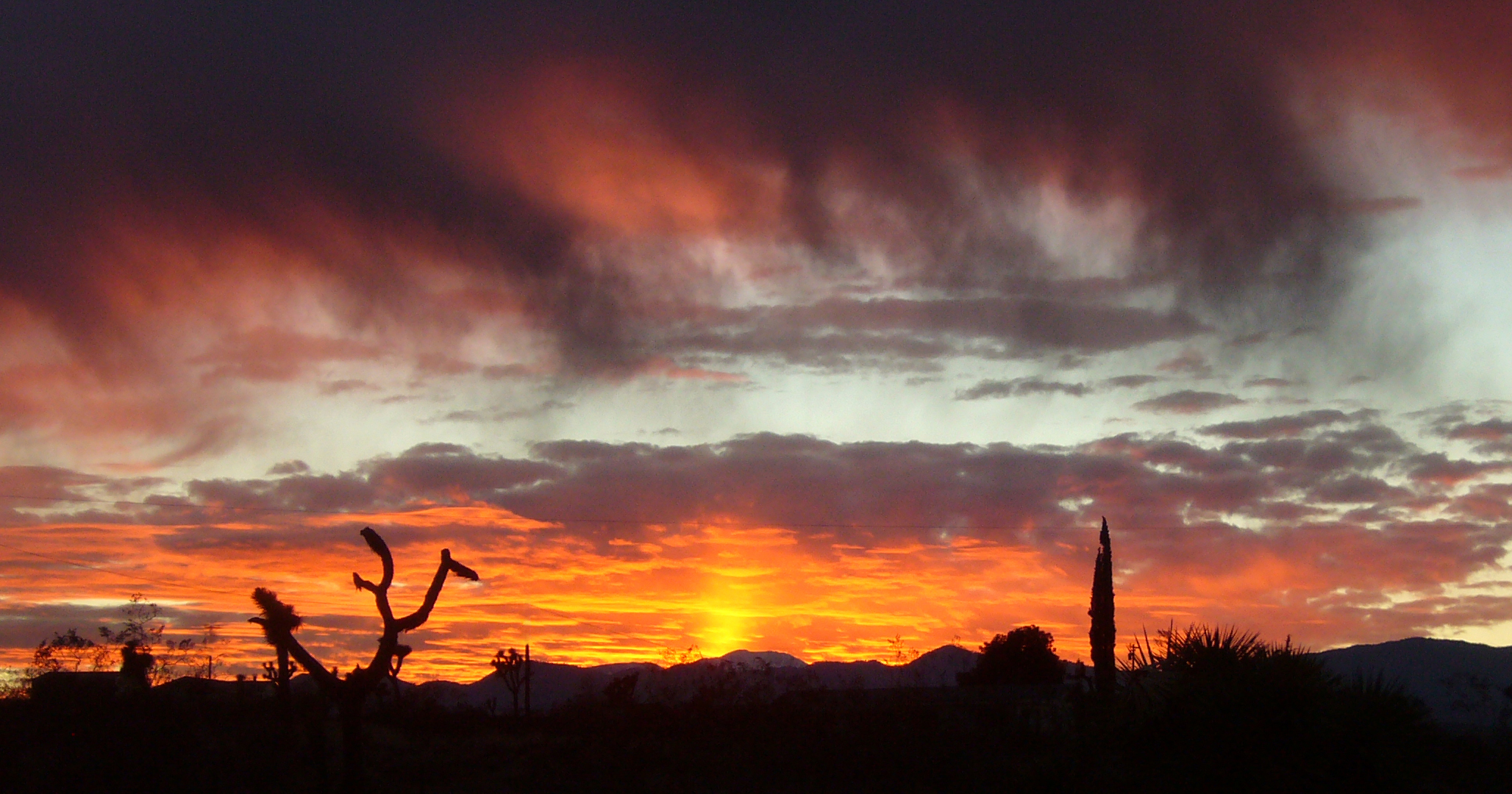
High Desert storm approaches at sunset.

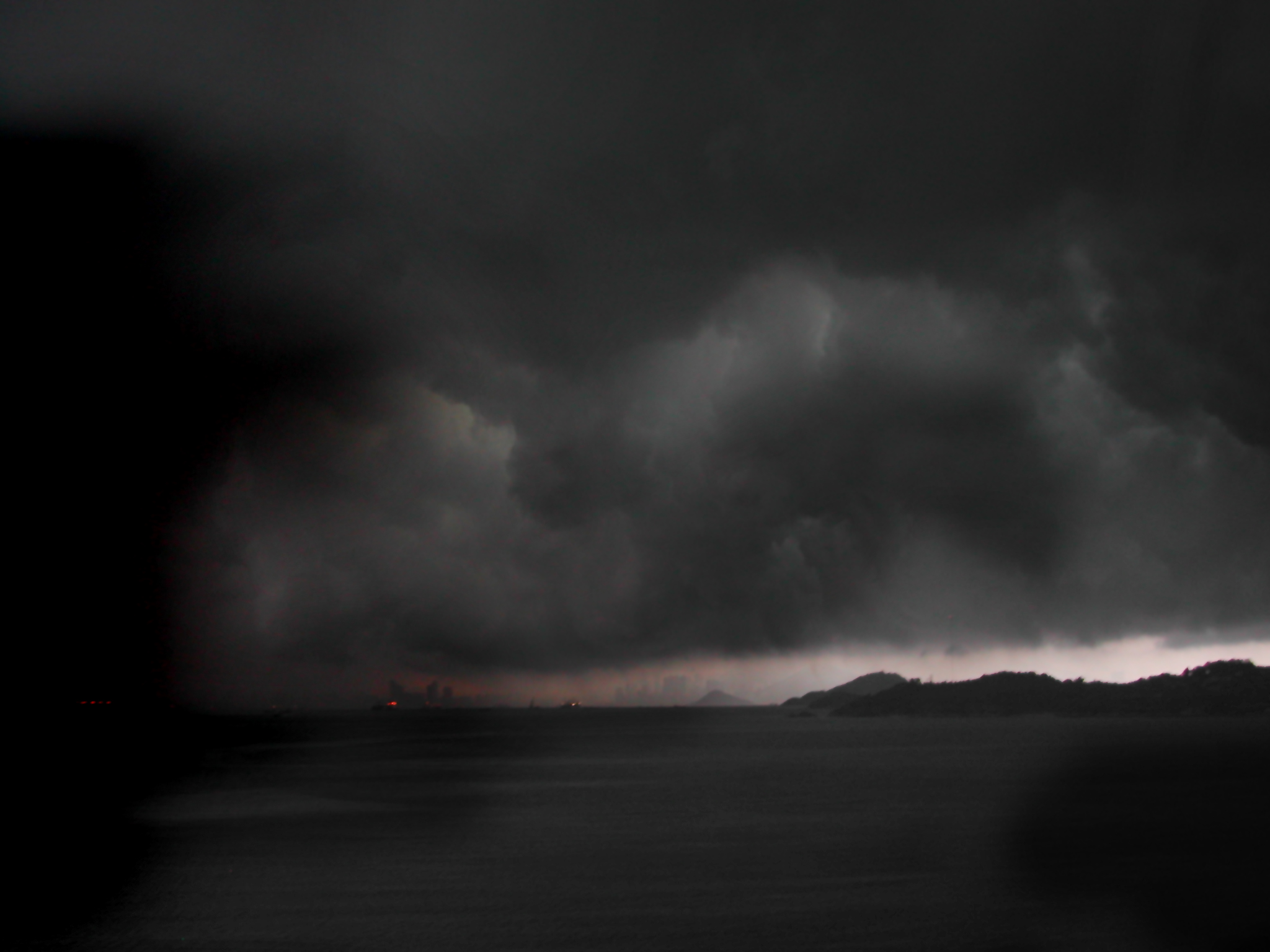
Heavy storm brought by Severe Tropical Storm Sanvu in Hong Kong.

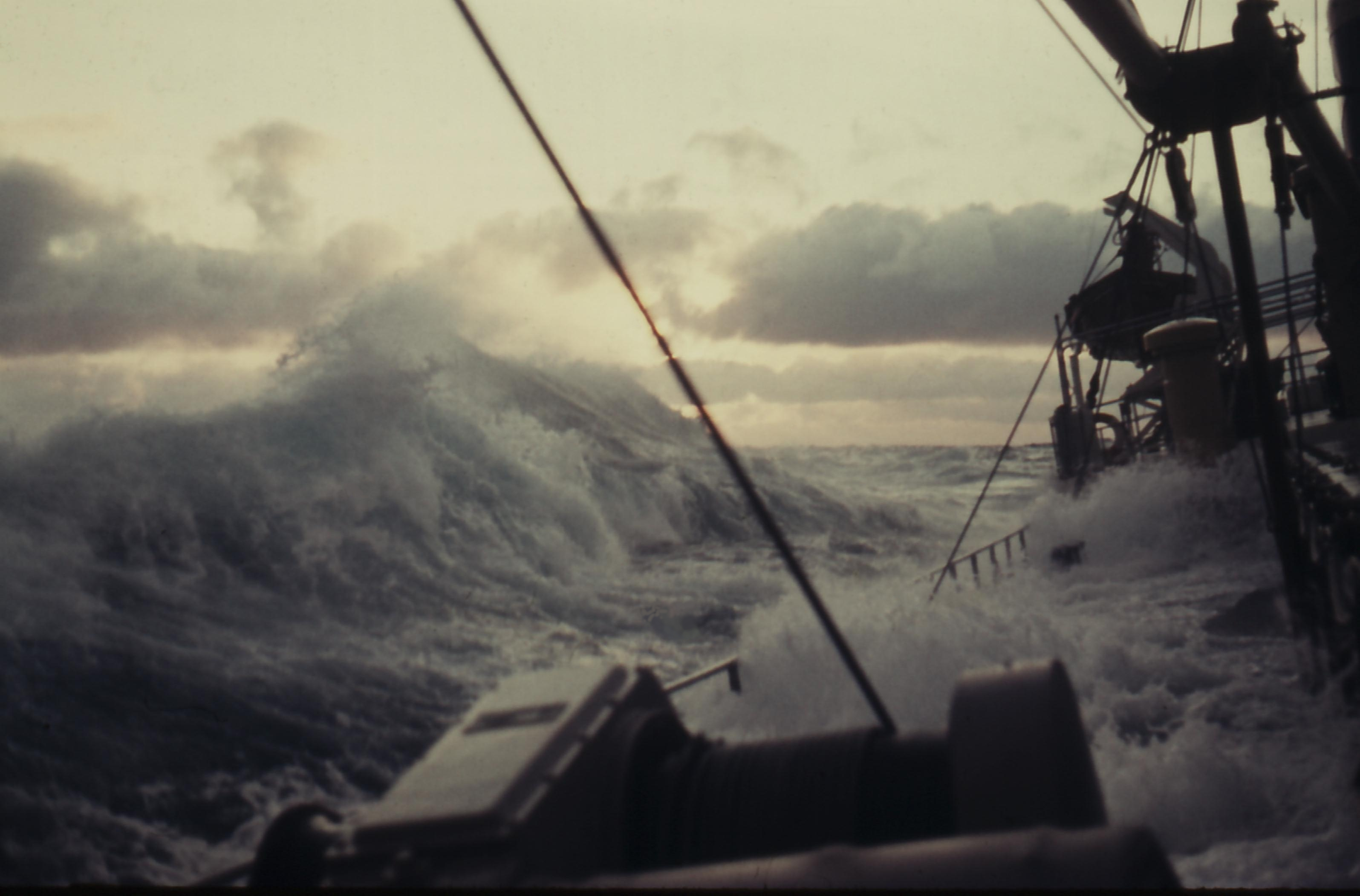
Winter North Atlantic storm strength Beaufort 9 causing extremely high waves.

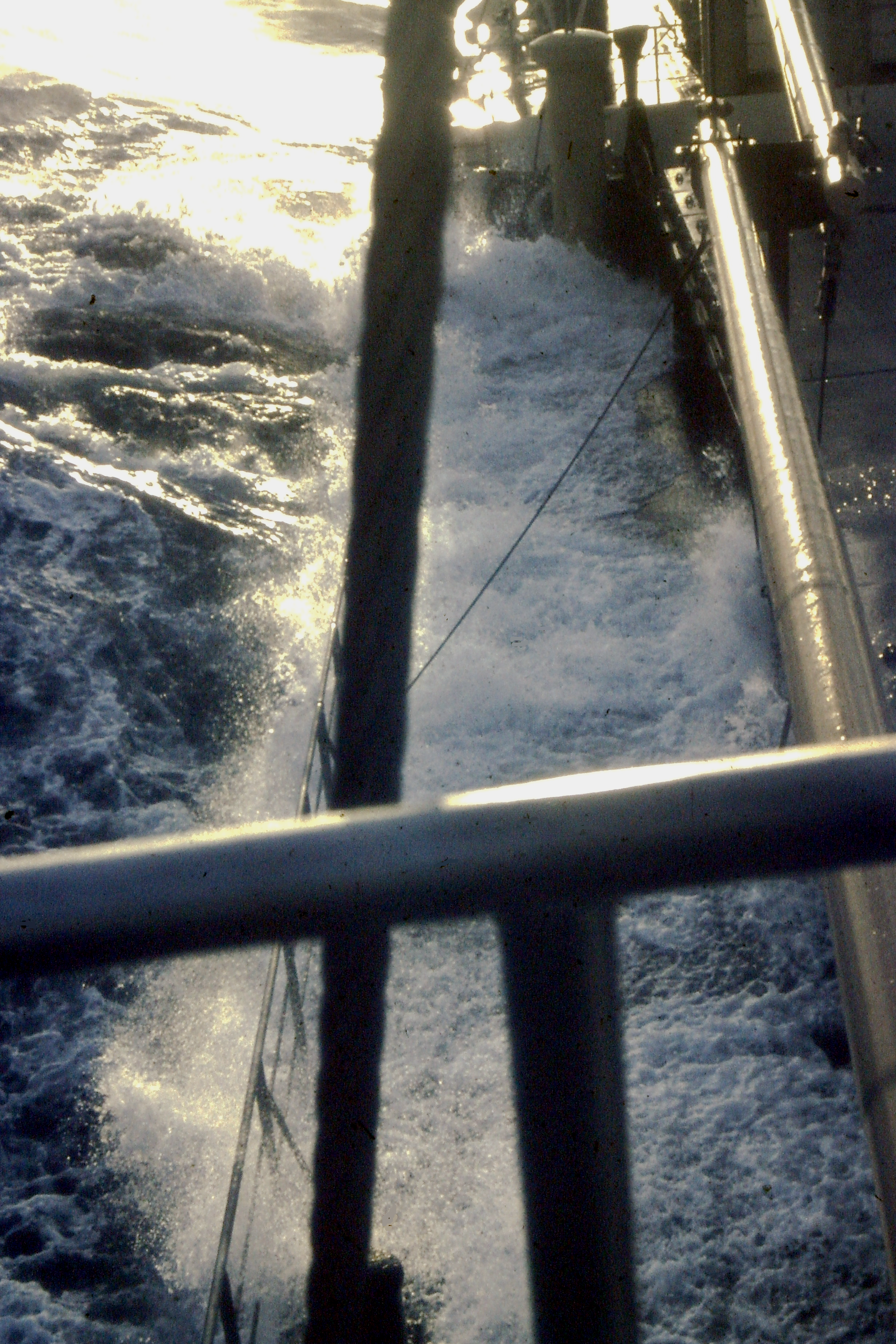
Storm waves coming abeam from starboard, causing water on deck.

== See also ==
- Anticyclonic storm
- ARkStorm
- Atlantic hurricane
- Cyclone
- Dust storm
- Extreme weather
- Geomagnetic storm
- Heat storm
- Nor'easter
- Perfect storm
- Pulse storm
- Salt storm
- Splitting storm
- Superstorm
- Tornado
- Tropical cyclone
- Hypercane
