= In the Garden of Beasts =

Book by Erik Larson

- Book cover of In the Garden of Beasts
- Author: Erik Larson
- Language: English
- Genre: History
- Publisher: Crown Publishers
- Publication date: 2011
- Publication place: United States
- Media type: Print (hardcover and paperback)
- Pages: 464
- ISBN: 0307408841
- LC Class: E748.D6 L37 2011

Erik Larson talks about In The Garden of Beasts: Love, Terror, and An American Family in Hitler's Berlin on Bookbits radio.

In the Garden of Beasts: Love, Terror, and an American Family in Hitler's Berlin is a 2011 non-fiction book by Erik Larson.

== Summary ==
Larson recounts the career of the American ambassador to Germany, William Dodd, particularly the years 1933 to 1937 when he and his family, including his daughter Martha, lived in Berlin. The ambassador, who had earned his PhD in Leipzig forty years earlier, and who, at the time of his appointment, was head of the History Department at the University of Chicago, initially hoped that Germany's new Nazi government would grow more moderate, including in its persecution of the Jews. Martha, separated from her husband and in the process of divorce, became caught up in the glamour and excitement of Berlin's social scene and had a series of liaisons, most of them sexual, including among them Gestapo head Rudolf Diels and Soviet attaché and secret agent Boris Vinogradov. She defended the regime to her skeptical friends. Within months of their arrival, the family became aware of the evils of Nazi rule. Dodd periodically protested against it. US President Roosevelt was pleased with Dodd's performance while most State Department officials, suspicious of his lack of background in their area of expertise, as well as his inability to finance embassy activities from his own wealth, found him undiplomatic and idiosyncratic.

The title of the work is a loose translation of Tiergarten, a zoo and park in the center of Berlin.

The other historical figures who appear in Larson's account include:

American officials

- Franklin D. Roosevelt, U.S. president
- George Gordon, counselor, U.S. Embassy in Berlin
- George S. Messersmith, U.S. consul in Berlin
- William Phillips, U.S. under secretary of state

German officials

- Rudolf Diels
- Hermann Göring
- Reinhard Heydrich
- Adolf Hitler
- Edgar Julius Jung, Papen's speechwriter
- Ernst Röhm
- Franz von Papen, Vice Chancellor under Hindenburg.
- Kurt von Schleicher, former Chancellor

Journalists

- Sigrid Schultz, American reporter and Central Europe bureau chief for the Chicago Tribune
- Bella Fromm, German-Jewish diplomatic correspondent for Ullstein Verlag
- H. V. Kaltenborn, American radio announcer
- Edgar Ansel Mowrer, Berlin bureau chief of the Chicago Daily News
- William Shirer, foreign correspondent of the Chicago Daily News

Diplomats

- André François-Poncet, French ambassador to Germany
- Eric Phipps, British ambassador to Germany

Other Americans

- Mildred Fish-Harnack, friend of Martha Dodd and American academic in Berlin
- Stephen Wise, influential American rabbi

Other Germans

- Fritz Haber
- Ernst Hanfstaengl, close friend of Adolf Hitler and Martha Dodd
- Victor Klemperer, diarist

== Awards and honors ==
- 2012 Chautauqua Prize, shortlist
- 2011 Christian Science Monitor 15 Best Nonfiction Books
