= Thunderstruck (disambiguation) =

"Thunderstruck" is a 1990 song by AC/DC.

Thunderstruck may also refer to:

== Arts, entertainment, and media ==
=== Music ===
- "Thunderstruck", a song by Owl City from Mobile Orchestra
- "Thunderstruck", a song by Erlend Bratland
- Thunderstruck, an album by Landmarq
- Thunderstruck, the record label that manages Freak Kitchen

=== Film and television ===
- Thunderstruck (2004 film), a 2004 Australian film
- Thunderstruck (2012 film), a 2012 American film
- "Thunderstruck" (Grey's Anatomy), a television episode
- "Thunderstruck" (9-1-1: Lone Star), a television episode

=== Literature ===
- Thunderstruck (short story collection), a 2014 short story collection by Elizabeth McCracken
- Thunderstruck (book), a 2006 book by Erik Larson

== Other uses ==
- S333 Thunderstruck, a revolver manufactured by Standard Manufacturing
- Operation Thunderstruck, a coalition military operation of the Iraq War

== See also ==
- Thunderstrike (disambiguation)
- Thunderstuck, a 2013 composition by Christopher Rouse
