= Sigrid Schultz =

American reporter and war correspondent

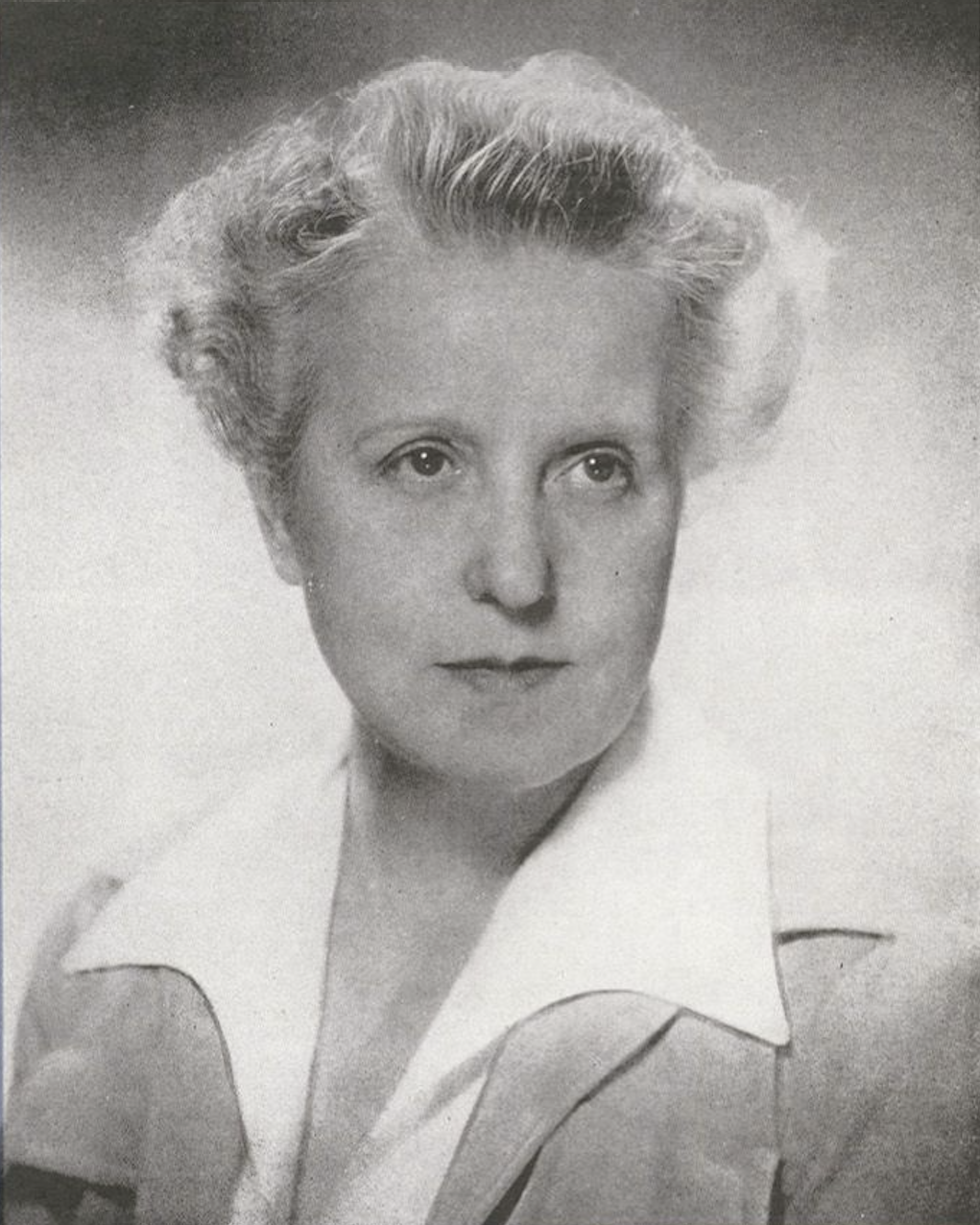
- Sigrid Schultz (1943)
- Born: January 15, 1893; Chicago, Illinois, U.S.
- Died: May 14, 1980 (aged 87); Westport, Connecticut
- Other name: John Dickson (pseudonym)
- Education: Sorbonne University (graduated 1914); Berlin University
- Occupations: Journalist, bureau chief
- Employers: Chicago Tribune; Mutual Broadcasting System
- Known for: Reporting on Nazism
- Notable work: Germany Will Try it Again (1944)
- Parents: Herman Schultz (father); Hedwig Schultz (née Jaskewitz) (mother)

Sigrid Schultz (January 15, 1893 – May 14, 1980) was an American reporter and war correspondent in an era when women were a rarity in both print and radio journalism. Working for the Chicago Tribune in Berlin, Germany from the 1920s to the 1940s and early years of World War II, she was the first female foreign bureau chief of a major U.S. newspaper.

== Early life and education ==
Schultz was born in Chicago, Illinois in the family of Herman and Hedwig Schultz (née Jaskewitz). Her parents were of Norwegian ancestry, and her father was a well-known painter who had studied at the Académie de peinture et de sculpture in Paris, France. In 1901, when Schultz was eight, her father obtained a commission to paint the king and queen of Württemberg in Germany and the family moved to Europe.

=== Education ===
For the first two years in Germany, while her father painted in Württemberg, Sigrid and her mother stayed with Hedwig's family in Wiesbaden. During that time, Sigrid was sent away to a school in Munich, where she experienced loneliness and was mocked for her German accent. Once the family moved to Paris, Sigrid attended Lycée Racine — lycée is the French equivalent of American high school education — and subsequently studied international law at the Sorbonne, graduating in 1914. She taught French and English in Berlin for much of World War I.

Some sources claim that while in Germany with her mother, she fell ill with what was believed to be tuberculosis, leading her to be forced to remain in Germany during World War I; however, Schultz herself wrote that she remained in Germany due to her parents' illness, and that around this period she also studied history and international law at Berlin University. (Her obituary in the Chicago Tribune said that she was "a student at Berlin University training to be an opera singer.")

== Career ==
At war's end, Colonel Robert R. McCormick, owner and publisher of the Chicago Tribune, needed a correspondent fluent in both German and English. Among other things, McCormick wanted someone able with the ability to explain in detail the Battle of Jutland, the war's most significant naval battle, to Tribune readers. Schultz joined the Tribune in 1919 and, with fluency in several languages to her credit, became the chief for Central Europe in 1926. At that time, Schultz worked with Richard Henry Little and Floyd Gibbons.She had been named the chief of the Berlin bureau for the Tribune late in 1925. It is believed that Schultz was the first woman to ever hold such a position for a major news media organization.

Beginning in 1938, Schultz began to report for the Mutual Broadcasting System along with the Chicago Tribune. In doing so, she became "the first woman to broadcast regularly on an American network from Europe." She was considered by some of her fellow reporters as only a fair writer but a superb investigator and reporter.

On July 13, 1939, one of Dickson's articles received front-page placement in the Tribune. The dispatch forecast the non-aggression pact that took place between Germany and the Soviet Union five weeks later. Writing as Dickson, Schultz reported that "Supporters of the theory of Nazi-Soviet cooperation claim that plans for a new partition of Poland, dividing it between Germany and Russia, have been concluded."

Shirer's Berlin Diary recounts the events of the morning of September 1, 1939.

Berlin, September 1

At six a.m., Sigrid Schultz — bless her heart — phoned. She said: "It's happened." I was very sleepy — my body and mind numbed, paralyzed. I mumbled: "Thanks, Sigrid," and tumbled out of bed. The war is on!

Schultz reported on the many military triumphs of the Wehrmacht during the first year of World War II, but was not permitted to travel to the front because she was a woman. She left Germany after being injured in an Allied air raid on Berlin. While in Spain, she developed typhus and returned to the United States in early 1941.

During this period, Schultz wrote a book about Germany titled Germany Will Try It Again and made a nationwide lecture tour about her quarter-century in Germany.

After the war, she continued her reporting and wrote several books. Schultz was working on a history of antisemitism in Germany when she died in 1980. (Her obituary in the Chicago Tribune said that she was "working on a book that was to be a history of the two World Wars and the Holocaust.")

== Schultz's writings ==
In Schultz's book Germany Will Try It Again, she describes, based on her first-hand witness reports on what in essence would equate with a German-Austrian Military-Industrial Complex composed of wealthy landowners (Junkers), bankers, and corporate businessmen (of companies still thriving today), who fired World War I, then planned a comeback despite defeat in 1918, propped up Hitler, were planning a comeback in 1944 (ultimately leading to the formation of Die Spinne and ODESSA) (Note: Detailed in the writings of Glenn Infield, Joseph Wechsberg, and Simon Wiesenthal.) as well as the Vatican ratlines to South America and the harboring of Nazi officers in the USA after 1945.

Lastly, Schultz covers the Nazi drive to build up business and political alliances in South America.

== Death ==
On May 15, 1980, Schultz died in her Westport, Connecticut, retirement home. She was 87.

== Papers and named scholarship ==
Schultz's papers are housed at the Wisconsin Historical Society.

Schultz's estate established a scholarship fund for journalism students. In 2014, Central Connecticut State University (CCSU) began awarding the Sigrid Schultz Scholarship for Future Journalists, given to two undergraduate students each year who major in journalism.

== See also ==
- Nazi Germany
- William L. Shirer
- Martha Dodd
- William E. Dodd
- Bella Fromm
- Mildred Harnack
- In the Garden of Beasts: Love, Terror, and an American Family in Hitler's Berlin

== Sources ==
- Levenda, Peter (1995). Unholy Alliance. New York: Avon Books.
- Schultz, Sigrid (1944). Germany Will Try It Again. New York: Reynal & Hitchcock.
- Shirer, William L. (1941). Berlin Diary: The Journal of a Foreign Correspondent 1934-1941. New York: Alfred A. Knopf.
- Tetens, T.H. (1961). The New Germany and the Old Nazis. New York: Random House. LCN 61-7240.
- Wechsberg, Glenn (1967). The Murderers Among Us: Simon Wiesenthal Memoirs. New York: McGraw-Hill.
- Wendt, Lloyd (1979). Chicago Tribune. Chicago: Rand McNally. ISBN 0-528-81826-0.
