= Isaac Cline =

American meteorologist

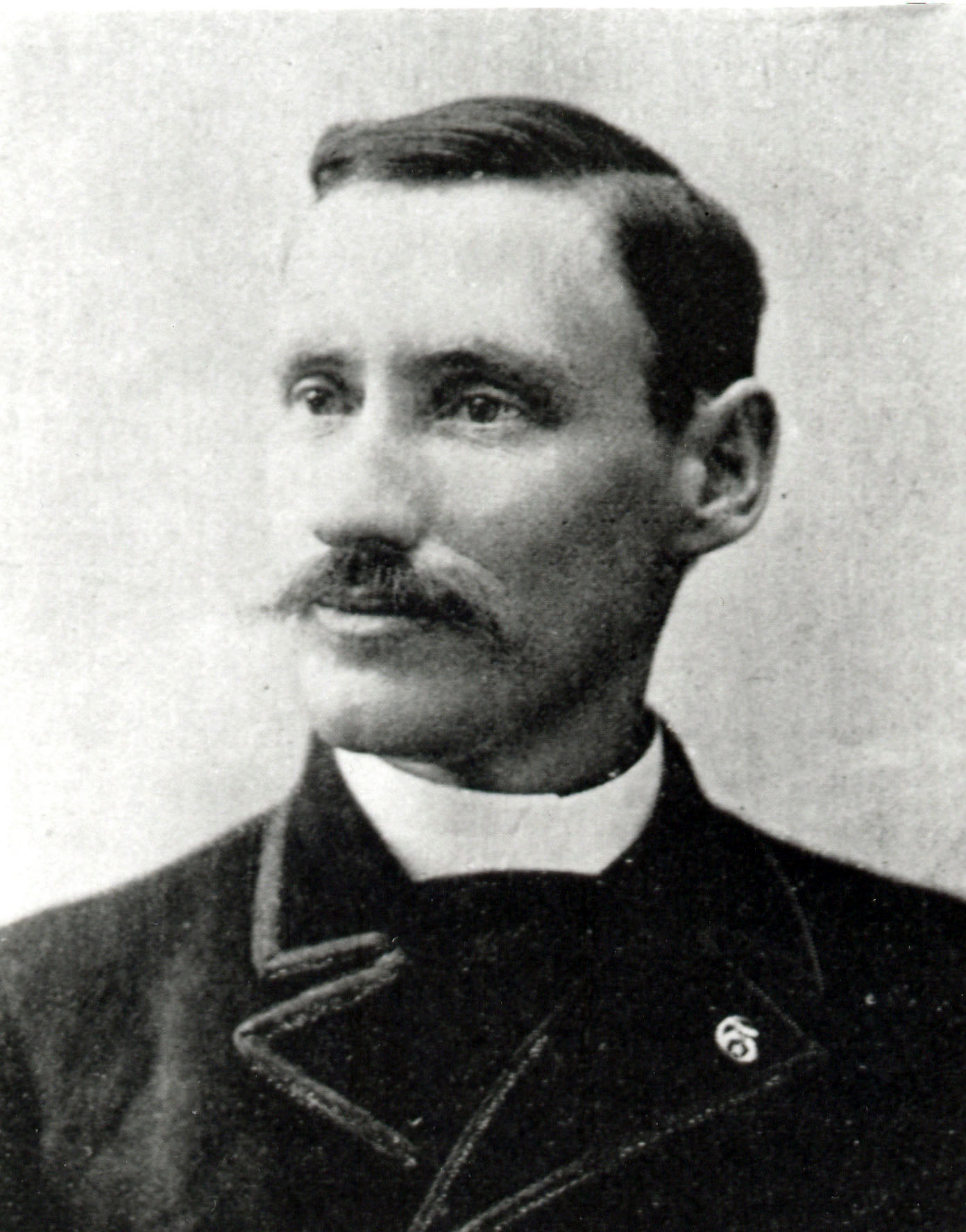
Isaac Cline as a young man

Isaac Monroe Cline (October 13, 1861 – August 3, 1955) was the chief meteorologist at the Galveston, Texas, office of the U.S. Weather Bureau, now known as the National Weather Service, from 1889 to 1901. In that role, he became a central figure in the devastating Galveston hurricane of 1900. The Isaac M. Cline Award, the NWS's highest honor, is named due to his "numerous contributions to the mission of the Weather Bureau" and is "one of the most recognized employees in weather service history."

== Early life ==
Cline was born near Madisonville, Tennessee, on October 13, 1861, to Jacob and Mary Cline. He had a younger brother, Joseph Leander Cline. Cline attended Hiwassee College, then in 1882, joined the meteorology training program of the U.S. Army Signal Corps. Isaac was first assigned to Little Rock, Arkansas, in order to take daily readings, as well as to observe the Rocky Mountain locusts and the relationship between their behavior and the climate. The locusts "evidently learned that [Isaac] had been put on their trail and disappeared." In his spare time in Little Rock, Isaac earned a Doctor of Medicine from the University of Arkansas. He was then assigned to Fort Concho, then to Abilene, Texas, where he met Cora May Bellew, whom he married March 17, 1887.

== Galveston ==
In March 1889, a Texas section of the Weather Bureau was being established, and Cline was sent to Galveston to organize and oversee it. Cline stayed with the office when it became part of the U.S. Weather Bureau in the 1891 transfer from the Signal Corps to the Department of Agriculture. In 1892, Isaac's younger brother, Joseph Cline, also began work as a meteorologist at the Galveston Weather Bureau.

During his time in Galveston, aside from running the weather office, Cline also taught Sunday school at his church, was a professor at the local medical college and, in 1896, earned a Doctor of Philosophy degree from Add-Ran Male & Female College, now Texas Christian University.

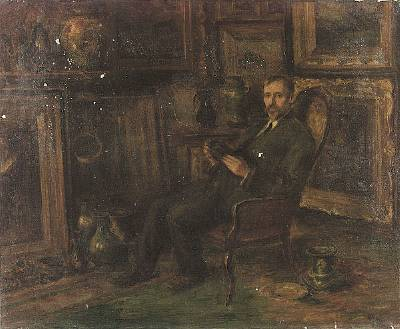
Dr. Isaac Monroe Cline at Home in New Orleans, 1910, by Robert Bledsoe Mayfield

=== Hurricane of 1900 ===
Cline was the second meteorologist to provide reliable forecasts of freezing weather. He also provided some of the first available flood warnings on the Colorado and Brazos rivers. However, in 1891, he wrote an article in the Galveston Daily News in which he gave his official meteorological opinion that the thought of a hurricane ever doing any serious harm to Galveston was "a crazy idea". Many residents had called for a seawall to protect the city, but Cline's statement helped to prevent its construction.

He was proven tragically wrong on September 8, 1900, when the Galveston hurricane of 1900 hit the island. Between 6,000 and 12,000 people were killed in what remains the deadliest natural disaster in U.S. history. Cline's wife, Cora, who was pregnant with their fourth child at the time, was one of those who perished in the storm. Cline was nearly drowned, but he managed to survive, as well as to save his youngest daughter, six-year-old Esther Bellew. Cline's brother, Joseph, saved Isaac's other two daughters, 12-year-old Allie May and 11-year-old Rosemary.

In his autobiography, Isaac Cline claimed that he had taken it upon himself to travel along the beach and other low-lying areas warning people personally of the storm's approach. It is known that around noon on September 8, he did breach Weather Bureau protocol by making a unilateral decision to issue a hurricane warning without first securing authorization from the Bureau's central office in Washington, D.C.. Cline estimated that thousands of lives were saved because of his decision not to wait for approval. However, no eyewitnesses reported seeing Cline personally warning people along the beach. Writer Erik Larson argued in his book Isaac's Storm that Cline did not warn anyone in Galveston prior to the issuance of his office's hurricane warning.

== Aftermath ==
Shortly before the destruction of Galveston, the Weather Bureau began establishing regional forecasting centers. The center for the Gulf Coast was initially located in Galveston, with Isaac Cline as chief forecaster; his brother Joseph, a fellow meteorologist, worked for him there. In 1901, the center was moved to New Orleans, Louisiana, and Isaac Cline moved with it. There he developed a stellar reputation over the years, successfully forecasting significant levels of flooding in 1912, 1915 and 1927. In 1927, he published the book Tropical Cyclones, a collection of his research. He was also the chief meteorogist in New Orleans during the Great Mississippi Flood of 1927. In 1934, by that time well respected and highly admired in New Orleans, Cline received an honorary doctorate from Tulane University.

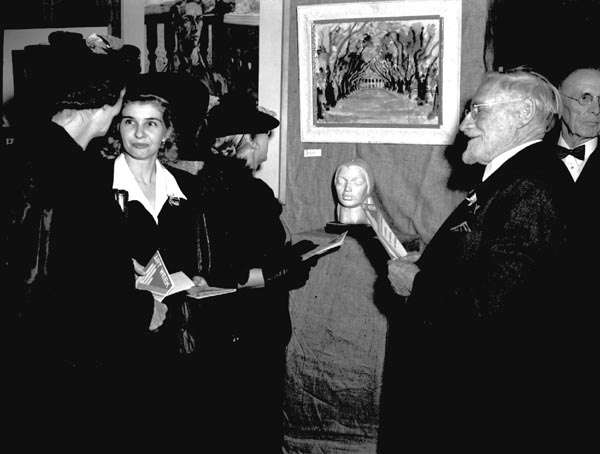
Cline in his later years, at a WPA Art show in New Orleans, 1941

Cline retired from the Weather Bureau in 1935, remained in New Orleans, and indulged his longtime interest in art, both by painting and by opening an art shop. He published multiple books about art:

- Art and Artists in New Orleans During the Last Century
- Contemporary Art and Artists in New Orleans (1924)

Cline died in 1955 at the age of 93.

His brother, Joseph Leander Cline, discusses the storm and its aftermath in his autobiography, When the Heavens Frowned (1946, originally published by Mathis Van Nort & Co.).

== Additional publications ==
- Floods in the Lower Mississippi Valley (1928)
- Cyclones, Hurricanes, and Typhoons and Other Storms (1934)
- A Century of Progress in the Study of Cyclones: Aids in Forecasting Movements and Destructive Agencies in Tropical Cyclones (1942)
- Storms, Floods and Sunshine (1945)
