= Thunderstruck (book) =

2006 book by Erik Larson

- Book cover of Thunderstruck
- Author: Erik Larson
- Language: English
- Genre: History
- Publisher: Crown Publishers
- Publication date: October 24, 2006
- Publication place: United States
- Media type: Print (hardcover and paperback)
- Pages: 480

Thunderstruck is a 2006 narrative non-fiction book by Erik Larson. Thunderstruck uses the same format as The Devil in the White City, interweaving two stories: a long-forgotten murder and escape attempt, and a seemingly unrelated event of great historical significance—the story of Guglielmo Marconi as he invented and developed his wireless telegraph.

The action takes place in Edwardian London and later on the sea coasts of Cornwall, Cape Cod, and Nova Scotia. Against the background of the socially rigid but technologically dynamic Edwardian society, Marconi, an Italian outsider, overcomes great technical difficulties to perfect his invention. At the same time, Hawley Harvey Crippen murders his wife and attempts to escape with his girlfriend across the North Atlantic. In the end, Crippen is the first criminal to be captured with the aid of wireless telegraphy.
