= Lethal Passage =

Book by Erik Larson

Lethal Passage: The Story of a Gun
- Author: Erik Larson
- Language: English
- Subject: True crime
- Genre: Non-fiction
- Publisher: Vintage Books
- Publication date: January 15, 1995
- Publication place: USA
- Pages: 304

Lethal Passage: The Story of a Gun is a 1995 non-fiction book by American author Erik Larson. Through the lens of a 1988 school shooting in Virginia Beach, the author explores America's gun culture and the ease in acquiring such weapons as the one used by the school shooter, the MAC-11.
