= Thunderstrike =

Thunderstrike may refer to:

- Thunderstrike (character), multiple Marvel Comics characters
- Thunderstrike (video game), a 1990 video game by Millennium Interactive
- AH-3 Thunderstrike, a 1992 video game by Core Design
  - Thunderstrike 2, a 1995 video game by Core Design
  - Thunderstrike: Operation Phoenix, a 2001 video game by Core Design

== See also ==
- Thunderstruck (disambiguation)
- Lightning strike, an electric discharge between the atmosphere and the ground
