= Bella Fromm =

German journalist

- Born: December 20, 1890. Nuremberg
- Died: February 9, 1972 (aged 81)
- Occupations: Journalist, author
- Known for: Blood and Banquets (1943)
- Spouses: Max Israel; Karl Julius Steuermann; Peter F. Welles
- Children: Grete-Ellen

Bella Fromm (20 December 1890 – 9 February 1972) was a German journalist and author of Jewish heritage, who lived in exile in the United States during World War II. She is best known as the author of Blood and Banquets (1943), an account of her time as diplomatic correspondent for Berlin newspapers during the Weimar Republic, and of her experiences during the first five years of the Third Reich. Although this book was published as an authentic contemporary diary and is frequently cited as such, recent research suggests that Fromm wrote it in the U.S. after leaving Germany.

== Life ==
Fromm was born to Siegfried and Greta Fromm and into a family of prosperous wine merchants of Jewish heritage. She was born in Nuremberg and grew up in Kitzingen in Lower Franconia. The Fromm family was originally from Spain, but lived in Germany for 500 years until the Holocaust in Germany. By her own account, her family were in good standing with the Bavarian royal family and other leaders of Bavarian high society. Her father died when she was a child, and her mother died in 1918. In 1911 she married a Jewish businessman, Max Israel, with whom she had a daughter, Grete-Ellen (known as “Gonny” in Fromm’s writing), and two grandchildren. After her divorce from Israel, she married Karl Julius Steuermann, from whom she was also later divorced. Her third marriage was to Peter F. Welles, a physician.

During World War I, Fromm worked for the German Red Cross and was decorated by the King of Bavaria. After her mother’s death, she inherited the family fortune and was able to devote her time to social work. The Inflation of 1923, however, destroyed her wealth and she was forced to look for work. Using family contacts, she was employed by the Ullstein press, a major Jewish-owned publishing house, and worked for the Ullstein newspapers, notably the BZ am Mittag and the Vossische Zeitung, a leading Berlin liberal newspaper. Initially confined to traditional roles for female journalists such as fashion and social gossip, Fromm proved talented and ambitious and soon graduated to writing about politics and diplomacy.

== Journalist ==
As a diplomatic correspondent for the Ullstein papers, Fromm became a well-known figure in Berlin high society. Among those with whom she may have been acquainted were Frederick Birchall (The New York Times correspondent and editor), Aristide Briand (French Prime Minister), Vittorio Cerruti (Italian Ambassador), William E. Dodd (U.S. Ambassador), André François-Poncet (French Ambassador), Ernst Hanfstaengl (friend of Adolf Hitler and his first foreign press chief), Louis P. Lochner (veteran American correspondent), Otto Meissner (head of the Presidential Chancellery, and later of Hitler’s Chancellery), Konstantin von Neurath (German Foreign Minister), Sir Eric Phipps (British Ambassador), Leni Riefenstahl (filmmaker), Hjalmar Schacht (Economics Minister) and Kurt von Schleicher (Chancellor before Hitler). By her own account, Fromm met Hitler, Hermann Göring, Rudolf Hess and Joseph Goebbels several times at diplomatic events, but was not friendly with any of them.

Fromm portrayed herself as a leading figure in Berlin's political society; she was on intimate terms with ministers, editors, and diplomats, and knew of confidential information about many of them. She makes much of her close friendship with Schleicher and his wife and writes of her attempts to warn Schleicher that President Paul von Hindenburg was about to remove him as Chancellor in favor of Hitler. It is notable, however, that two of the best-known contemporary accounts of politics and the press in Berlin at this time do not mention Fromm. This includes William Shirer’s Berlin Diary, and the memoirs of Hitler’s press chief Otto Dietrich, Zwölf Jahre mit Hitler

As an outspoken liberal (and because of her Jewish heritage), Fromm's position on German affairs became increasingly more precarious after the Nazis came to power in 1933. She was protected to some extent by her friendship with leading foreign diplomats and also with conservative members of Hitler’s government such as Schacht and von Neurath. In 1934 she sent her daughter to the United States. After 1934 she was no longer able to write under her own name, but her journalism continued to appear anonymously. She continued to be invited to diplomatic and social events.

Deprived of most of her income from journalism, Fromm returned to her family’s trade as a wine merchant, exploiting her contacts with foreign embassies and wealthy Berliners. According to her account, she also used her contacts to secure visas for many German Jews desperate to emigrate. For this reason, she wrote, she refused to heed the advice of her friends that she should leave Germany before it was too late. In 1938, however, Jews were excluded from the wine trade. Left with no income, and in the face of increasing anti-Semitic persecution, Fromm emigrated to the U.S. in September 1938.

In New York, Fromm worked as a typist and secretary and met her third husband, Peter Wolff. With the entry of the U.S. into World War II in December 1941, Fromm decided to write a book about her experiences in Weimar and Nazi Germany. In 1943, Blood and Banquets was first published in England. It was aimed at a war-time American readership and is stridently anti-Nazi and pro-American in tone.

== Historical analysis ==
In Blood and Banquets Fromm asserted: "In preparing this book, I made excerpts from the original entries in my diary… The parts of my diary which are contained in this book stand just as they were originally written…"

This assertion, however, has been challenged by the American historian Henry Ashby Turner, who examined Fromm’s private papers in the Boston University library. In a 2000 journal article, Turner maintained that Fromm wrote the book in New York, basing it on her extensive collection of newspaper cuttings, on secondary sources and on her own memory. Turner noted that Fromm’s papers contain no original manuscript of a diary, only a series of typescripts produced on an American typewriter and on an American writing paper. Turner also noted significant changes between successive drafts, contradicting Fromm’s assertion that the entries in the published book “stand just as they were originally written.”

Turner also pointed out factual errors in Blood and Banquets, which, he said, arose from Fromm’s use of secondary sources, and which would not have occurred if the book had been an authentic contemporary diary. He cites as an example an entry for 29 January 1932, in which Fromm refers to a speech given by Hitler on 27 January. In fact, Turner says, Hitler gave his speech on 26 January, which Fromm would have known had she been basing her book on an actual contemporary diary. The error, Turner says, is also to be found in Fritz Thyssen’s book I Paid Hitler, published in the U.S. in 1941. He concludes that Fromm wrote her “diary” entry based on Thyssen’s book rather than on an actual diary. In other entries, he says, Fromm gives erroneous dates for speeches by Goebbels (including one she claimed to have witnessed) as a result of relying on newspaper cuttings rather than her own knowledge.

Turner is also sceptical about Fromm’s claims to have been a close friend of Kurt von Schleicher and the recipient of his confidences. He writes: “A first-name relationship – for upper-class Germans of that time a near-ceremonial matter – between Kurt von Schleicher and a society columnist he had met at a diplomatic reception is, to say the least, lacking in plausibility.” He concludes: “To sum up, Blood and Banquets, a memoir about events in Germany that was composed years later in America in demonstrably inventive fashion… should be regarded by historians with skepticism.”

Despite these doubts about its authenticity, Fromm’s book, with its many colourful descriptions of social life in Berlin in the 1920s and '30s and its robustly anti-Nazi views, continues to be widely quoted by postwar historians of the Weimar and Third Reich periods. Among recent works to cite Blood and Banquets are biographies of Goebbels (by Toby Thacker), Hess (by Peter Padfield), Riefenstahl (by Steven Bach), Magda Goebbels (by Anja Klabunde), Eva Braun (by Angela Lambert), William E. Dodd (by Erik Larson) and Stephanie von Hohenlohe (by Martha Schad). Other works to use Fromm as a source include Royals and the Reich by Jonathan Petropoulos, High Society in the Third Reich by Fabrice d'Almeida Hitler’s Women by Guido Knopp and The Last Winter of the Weimar Republic by Rüdiger Barth and Hauke Frederichs, which extensively quotes from Fromm's flawed memoir throughout.

In 1946 Fromm returned to Germany for several research trips, not permanently. In 1961 she published a novel based on her experiences in exile, Die Engel weinen (The Angels Cry), which was poorly received. In 1958 she was awarded the Cross of Merit First Class (Verdienstkreuz Erster Klasse) by the Federal Republic of Germany. She died in New York in 1972. In 1993 Blood and Banquets was translated into German and published under the title Als Hitler mir die Hand küsste (When Hitler Kissed My Hand).
