= The Devil in the White City =

Book by Erik Larson

- Cover of The Devil in the White City
- Author: Erik Larson
- Language: English
- Genre: Historical non-fiction
- Publisher: Crown Publishers
- Publication date: 2003
- Publication place: United States
- Media type: Print (hardcover and paperback)
- Pages: 447
- ISBN: 0-609-60844-4
- OCLC: 54397544

The Devil in the White City: Murder, Magic, and Madness at the Fair That Changed America is a 2003 historical non-fiction book by Erik Larson. Set in Chicago during the 1893 World's Columbian Exposition, The Devil in the White City tells the story of the World's Fair architect Daniel Burnham and the concurrent story of H. H. Holmes, a criminal figure widely considered the first serial killer in the United States.

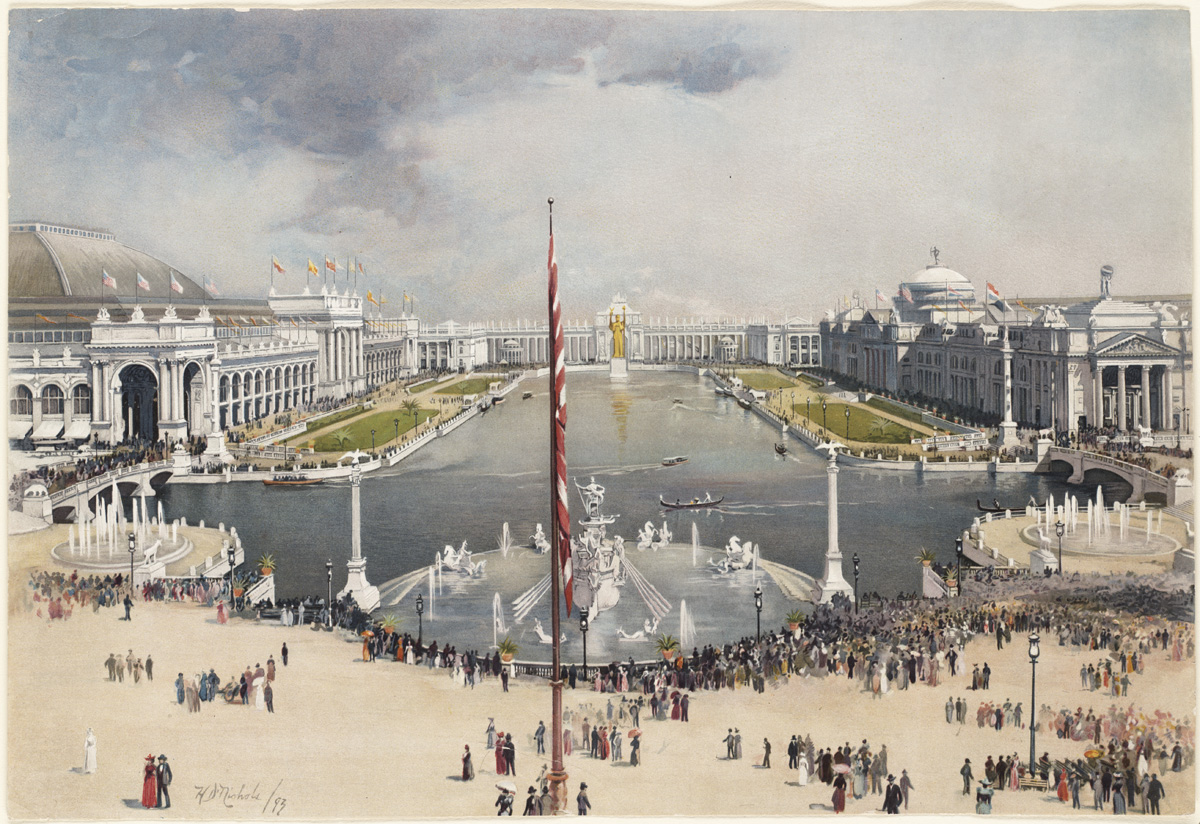
The Chicago World's Fair, 1893

== Plot ==
The Devil in the White City is in four parts, the first three happening in Chicago between 1890 and 1893. Part four of the book takes place in Philadelphia circa 1895. The book interweaves the true tales of Daniel Burnham, the architect behind the 1893 World's Fair, and H. H. Holmes, a serial killer who lured his victims to their deaths in his elaborately constructed "Murder Castle".

Burnham ran into many challenges when it came to the World's Fair including a fire, difficulty engineering the buildings to be safe, and a lack of funds for the fair. H. H. Holmes was responsible for multiple murders. His "dungeon" was equipped with secret rooms, torture chambers, and a large furnace to cremate the bodies of his victims. Holmes was known as a charming man who had the ability to seduce his victims. In the book, he mainly targets women.

Other subplots include events such as the assassination of Chicago Mayor Carter Harrison III by Patrick Eugene Prendergast mere days before the close of the fair.

== Reception ==
Janet Maslin of The New York Times praised the book as "vivid" and "lively", and commented on how the research done by Larson on the many "odd and amazing" events of the 1893 exhibition are "given shape and energy" by his "dramatic inclinations".

David Traxel for The New York Times criticized Larson for having "little sense of pacing or focus" in the "grab-bag" approach he took when discussing the exhibition. Regarding the discussion of Holmes in the book, he writes that Larson's "imaginative touches…sometimes goes farther than the sources warrant".

In a review for Newsweek, Malcolm Jones wrote that "only in the notes at the back of the book does [Larson] admit that the chapters describing Holmes's murders are merely conjecture built on a handful of facts"; even so, the story of the fair was "too enchanting" so even that "grave misstep can't doom" the book.

== Adaptations ==
=== Ballet ===
Ann Reinking collaborated with composer Bruce Wolosoff and Melissa Thodos of Thodos Dance Chicago to create the ballet The Devil in the White City, based on the novel; the Chicago Sun-Times named it "Best Dance of 2011".

=== Documentary ===
In 2007, a television documentary inspired by the book titled Madness in the White City aired on the National Geographic Channel.

=== Television and film ===
In 2010, Leonardo DiCaprio purchased the film rights to The Devil in the White City. Multiple attempts to revive the project as television or film have stalled or ended since 2011.

Originally envisioned by DiCaprio as a feature film when he purchased the film rights in 2010, the film version as originally planned would have been directed by Martin Scorsese, written by Billy Ray, and produced jointly by Paramount Pictures, Double Feature Films, and DiCaprio's Appian Way Productions.

In 2019, Hulu began developing a television series based on The Devil in the White City, with Leonardo DiCaprio and Martin Scorsese signed on as executive producers. In January 2022, actor Keanu Reeves was reported to be in negotiations to star, with Todd Field set to direct the first two episodes. Production was expected to begin in March 2023 in Chicago and Toronto, with a planned 2024 release. Both Keanu Reeves and Todd Field exited the project in early October, 2022. Hulu confirmed in March 2023 that it would not move forward with the television series, and producers began shopping the concept to other distributors.

In January 2025, 20th Century Studios announced their intention to revive the feature film adaptation of Devil in the White City, with Scorsese to direct, and DiCaprio to star in the film. There have been no further updates on the film since that announcement, however, and Scorsese and DiCaprio have begun filming another movie since.

== Honors ==
- 2003 New York Times best seller (Nonfiction)
- 2003 International Horror Guild Award (Nonfiction)
- 2003 San Francisco Chronicle Best Book of the Year
- 2003 National Book Award (Nonfiction), finalist
- 2003 CWA Gold Dagger for Non-Fiction, shortlist
- 2003 Great Lakes Book Award (Nonfiction), finalist
- 2004 Washington State Book Award
- 2004 Pacific Northwest Booksellers Association Award
- 2004 Edgar Award (Best Fact Crime), winner
- 2004 Book Sense Book of the Year Honor Book, winner
- 2009 ALA Outstanding Books for the College Bound (History & Cultures)
