= Splitting storm =

Meteorological process associated with developing thunderstorms

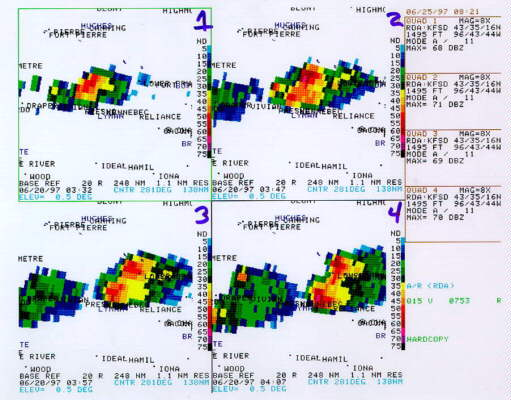
Evolution of a splitting thunderstorm as observed by weather radar in the Northern Hemisphere. As the parent storm moves east (towards the right), it splits into a left-moving and right-moving component, with the left-moving storm visibly weaker.

A splitting storm is a phenomenon when a convective thunderstorm will separate into two supercells, with one propagating towards the left (the left mover) and the other to the right (the right mover) of the mean wind shear direction across a deep layer of the troposphere. In most cases, this mean wind shear direction is roughly coincident with the direction of the mean wind. Each resulting cell bears an updraft that rotates opposite of the updraft in the other cell, with the left mover exhibiting a clockwise-rotating updraft and the right mover exhibiting a counterclockwise-rotating updraft. Storm splitting, if it occurs, tends to occur within an hour of the storm's formation.

Storm splitting in the presence of large amounts of ambient crosswise vorticity, as characterized by a straight hodograph, produces similarly strong left and right movers. Storm splits also occur in environments where streamwise vorticity is present, as characterized by a more curved hodograph. However in this situation one updraft is highly favored over the other, with the weaker split quickly dissipating; in this case, the lesser favored split may be so weak that the process is not noticeable on radar imagery. In the Northern Hemisphere, where hodograph curvature tends to be clockwise, right-moving cells tend to be stronger and more persistent; the opposite is true in the Southern Hemisphere where hodograph curvature tends to be counterclockwise.

== Characteristics ==
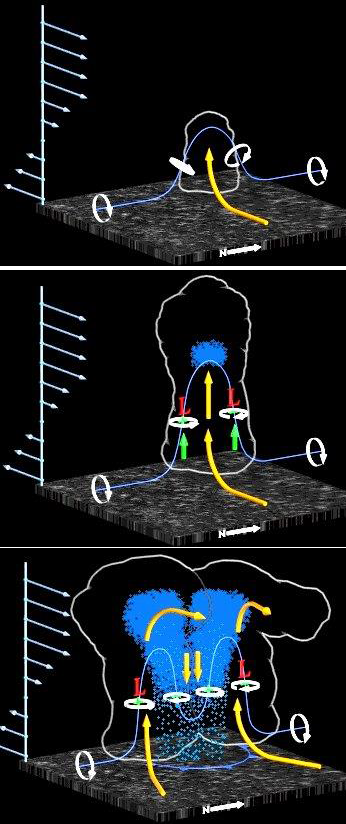
An idealized depiction of storm splitting. Top: A formative updraft tilts initially horizontal rotation present in the environment into the vertical, producing counter-rotating vortices on either side of the updraft. Middle: The vortices generate new updrafts. Bottom: A developing downdraft causes the two newly formed updrafts to separate.

Storm splitting was discovered via weather radar in the 1960s. Storm splitting is most favored when the direction of wind shear is aligned with the motion of the storm, a condition known as crosswise vorticity (via the right hand rule, the direction of ambient rotation associated with this vorticity would be perpendicular to the storm motion). Such conditions can be quantified by having low storm-relative helicity and can be associated with straight hodographs. In these cases, wind shear is largely unidirectional in the lower to middle troposphere. Splitting tends to occur within roughly 30–60 minutes after the formation of the parent thunderstorm and can occur repeatedly so long as sufficient crosswise vorticity is present. The presence of ambient vorticity produces rolls of horizontal rotation that a developing storm may encounter. As the formative updraft associated with the storm pulls this rotation up and into the storm, the rotation is tilted into the vertical on opposing flanks of the updraft. On one side, this results in clockwise rotation, while the other rotates counterclockwise. These areas of rotation are located at right angles to the wind shear direction, with one occurring left of this direction and the other to the right. In the Northern Hemisphere, the left rotation is anticyclonic while the right rotation is cyclonic. The rotation leads to the development of a new, rotating updraft beneath each area of rotation, which separate from one another to produce two separated storms; as both cells have rotating updrafts, both are supercells. This process can be accelerated if precipitation occurs between the two updrafts, cooling the air and producing downwards drag that eliminates the original updraft and further separates the split cells.

Once a storm splits into two, the left-splitting storm tends to move in a direction left of the mean wind shear direction, while the right-splitting moves right of the mean wind shear direction. The split storms are known as left movers and right movers due to this behavior. The resulting left or right motion taken by the split storms may be more or less aligned with the direction of the ambient wind shear. This increases or decreases the ambient crosswise vorticity ingested into the split updrafts, respectively, in the frame of reference of the split storms. The storm that moves in a direction increasingly askew from the wind shear direction draws in increasingly streamwise vorticity. This tends to be the right mover in the Northern Hemisphere and the left mover in the Southern Hemisphere; in either case, this is the storm with cyclonic rotation. While storm splitting can reduce crosswise vorticity, crosswise vorticity may still be present. Thus, the left and right moving storms can repeatedly undergo further storm splitting if significant crosswise vorticity remains.

Physical processes within supercells and interactions with their environment complicate prediction of the motion of supercells, including left and right movers. Commonly used methods for approximating the motion of splitting storms tend to estimate motion based on empirically observed deviations away from the mean wind shear vector.

If the environmental vorticity is fully crosswise, storm splitting produces two oppositely rotating cells of similar intensity. In this case, both storms symmetrically deviate away from the mean wind shear direction. The left mover acquires increasingly clockwise vorticity, while the right mover acquires increasingly counterclockwise vorticity. In the absence of the Coriolis force, both cells are mirror images of one another. However, the Coriolis force causes the cyclonic cell to be slightly stronger. Because of turbulent friction, the direction of wind shear commonly varies near the surface such that hodographs are rarely ever straight in the lower troposphere. If the direction of the wind shear changes with height, such that some streamwise vorticity is present, the ingestion of vorticity by the split updrafts leads to one updraft being enhanced and the other being suppressed. If the hodograph turns clockwise with height, the right mover is enhanced, and if the hodograph turns counterclockwise, the left mover is enhanced. Most of the difference in the strengths of the split cells arises from this directional wind shear, rather than the Coriolis force. Storm splitting becomes less pronounced as hodograph curvature increases, resulting in shorter-lived anticyclonic cells. In extreme cases, where there is a strongly curving hodograph, the suppressed updraft will be so weak from the start, the splitting process will not be evident on radar, and a dominant cell will immediately be present shortly after convective initiation. While cyclonic splitting supercells (right movers in the Northern Hemisphere) have been more widely studied due to their typically longer duration and production of severe weather, anticyclonic supercells can also produce severe weather.

When multiple thunderstorms develop, splitting storms can interact with other splitting storms. If a line of storms develop along a boundary, the storms at the ends of the line are typically the most isolated and free from interacting with splitting cells.

== Dynamics ==
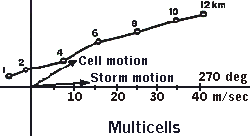
Storm splitting is favored in environments where hodographs are less curved.

The movement of air parcels in the atmosphere can cause a localized increase in air pressure ahead of the air parcel and a decrease in air pressure in the wake of the parcel as the parcel interacts with the ambient air. Such variations in pressure are known as dynamic pressure perturbations. Within a rotating updraft, the variation of this dynamic pressure perturbation $p'_d$ with height $z$ may be approximated as the combination of a linear and nonlinear term:

$$\frac{\partial p_d'}{\partial z} \propto 2 \frac{\partial}{\partial z}\mathbf{S} \cdot \nabla_h w' - \frac{1}{2}\frac{\partial \zeta'^2}{\partial z}$$

where $\mathbf{S}$ represents the mean vertical wind shear vector, $\nabla_h w'$ represents the horizontal gradient of the vertical wind associated with the updraft, and $\zeta$ is the vorticity within the updraft.

When horizontal rotation is first lifted in an updraft, it produces a cyclonic and anticyclonic vortex on opposing sides of the updraft, with the strength of those vortices typically maximized in the mid-troposphere some 4–8 km (2.5–5.0 mi) above the surface. Each vortex is associated with minimum in air pressure aloft at the center of the vortex, with the surrounding air in cyclostrophic balance. Regardless of the sign of vorticity (i.e. the direction of rotation), the quantity $\zeta'^2$ at the location of the vortices tends to increase from the surface up to the mid-troposphere, where the vortices are most pronounced. Thus, $p'_d$ decreases with height, resulting in a vertical pressure gradient and favoring upwards motion beneath the two vortices. This produces two new updrafts on opposing sides of the original updraft. The generation of updrafts on the flanks of the original updraft induces horizontal updraft-shear propagation, such that the left-splitting cell continues to move towards the left relative to the shear vector, while the right-splitting cell moves towards the right. This implies that the initial splitting of a thunderstorm is governed by nonlinear dynamics. Because the tilting of horizontal vorticity into the vertical is most pronounced along the flanks of an updraft, the split storms continue to move away from the mean wind shear direction. In cases where vorticity is predominantly streamwise, as characterized by a strongly curved hodograph, the linear term is a stronger influence on vertical dynamic pressure perturbations. Thus, storm splitting is less favored when the ambient vorticity is streamwise.

== See also ==
- Mesocyclone
- Descending reflectivity core
- List of severe weather phenomena
