= Erik Larson (author) =

American author and journalist

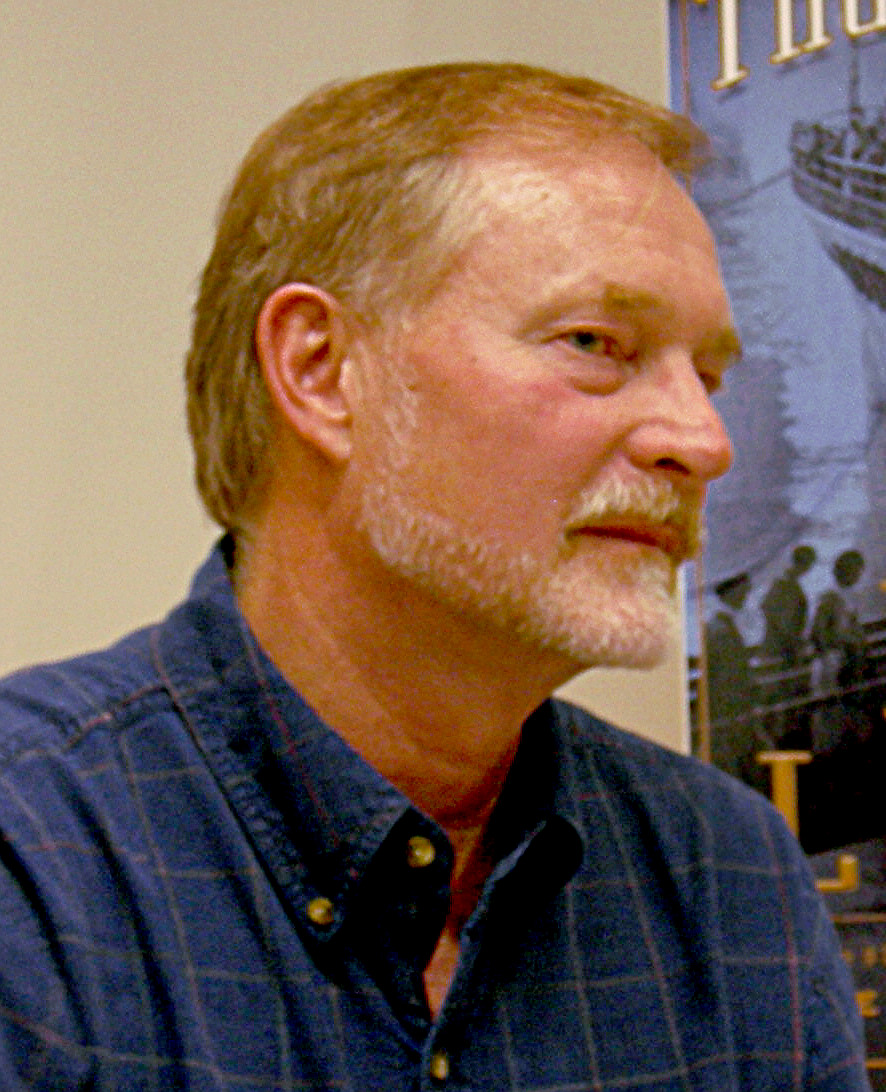
- Born: January 3, 1954 (age 72); New York City, U.S.
- Education: University of Pennsylvania (BA); Columbia University (MA)
- Website: eriklarsonbooks.com

Erik Larson (born January 3, 1954) is an American journalist and author of mostly historical nonfiction books. His books include Isaac's Storm (1999), The Devil in the White City (2003), In the Garden of Beasts (2011), and Dead Wake (2015). The Devil in the White City won the 2004 Edgar Award in the Best Fact Crime category, among other awards.

== Early life and education ==
Larson was born in Brooklyn and grew up in Freeport, Long Island, New York. He studied Russian history at the University of Pennsylvania and graduated summa cum laude in 1976. After a year off, he attended the Columbia University Graduate School of Journalism, graduating in 1978. He was inspired to go into journalism after seeing the movie All the President's Men.

== Writing career ==
Larson's first newspaper job was with the Bucks County Courier Times in Levittown, Pennsylvania, where he wrote about murder, witches, environmental poisons, and other "equally pleasant" things. He later became a features writer for The Wall Street Journal and Time. His magazine stories have appeared in The New Yorker, The Atlantic Monthly, Harper's, and other publications.

=== Books ===
Erik Larson talks about In The Garden of Beasts: Love, Terror, and An American Family in Hitler's Berlin on Bookbits radio.

Larson has written a number of books, mostly historical nonfiction. In a 2016 interview with the Knoxville Mercury, Larson stated he does all of his own research, asking, "why should I let anybody else have that fun?" He included among his literary inspirations David McCullough, Barbara Tuchman, David Halberstam, and Walter Lord.

Larson's 2006 book, Thunderstruck, intertwines the story of Hawley Harvey Crippen with that of Guglielmo Marconi and the invention of radio.

Larson released his first novel in audiobook format only, titled No One Goes Alone, on September 28, 2021.

=== Teaching and public speaking ===
Larson has taught non-fiction writing at San Francisco State University, the Johns Hopkins Writing Seminars, and the University of Oregon, and he has spoken to audiences across the United States.

== Personal life ==
Larson has lived in Philadelphia; Bristol, Pennsylvania; San Francisco; and Baltimore. He and his wife, Dr. Christine Gleason, have three daughters. They reside in New York City and maintain a home in Seattle, Washington.

== Works ==
Title	Year	ISBN	Publisher	Subject matter	Interviews, presentations, and reviews	Comments
The Naked Consumer: How Our Private Lives Become Public Commodities	1992	ISBN 9780805017557	Henry Holt and Company	Consumer privacy, Market research		
Lethal Passage	1994	ISBN 9780517596777	Crown Publishers	Gun culture in the U.S., Gun law in the U.S., Gun politics in the U.S., Gun violence in the U.S.		The subtitle for the 1994 hardcover version is How the Travels of a Single Handgun Expose the Roots of America's Gun Crisis; The subtitle of the 1995 paperback version is The Story of a Gun.
Isaac's Storm: A Man, a Time, and the Deadliest Hurricane in History	1999	ISBN 9780609602331	Random House	Isaac Cline, 1900 Galveston hurricane	Presentation by Larson on Isaac's Storm, November 6, 1999, C-SPAN; Presentation by Larson on Isaac's Storm, August 22, 2000, C-SPAN; Book group discussion on Isaac's Storm, November 21, 2005, C-SPAN	
The Devil in the White City: Murder, Magic and Madness at the Fair That Changed America	2002	ISBN 9780609608449	Crown Publishers	World's Columbian Exposition, Daniel Burnham, H. H. Holmes	Presentation by Larson on The Devil in the White City, February 18, 2003, C-SPAN; Booknotes interview with Larson on The Devil in the White City, September 14, 2003, C-SPAN; Book group discussion on The Devil in the White City, October 13, 2005, C-SPAN	
Thunderstruck	2006	ISBN 9781400080663	Crown Publishers	Hawley Harvey Crippen, Guglielmo Marconi	Presentation by Larson on Thunderstruck, June 9, 2007, C-SPAN	
In the Garden of Beasts: Love, Terror, and an American Family in Hitler's Berlin	2011	ISBN 9780307408846	Crown Publishers	William Dodd, Nazification of Germany	Fresh Air interview with Larson on In the Garden of the Beasts, May 2, 2011, National Public Radio; Presentation by Larson on In the Garden of the Beasts, May 23, 2011, C-SPAN; Q&A interview with Larson on In the Garden of the Beasts, July 24, 2011, C-SPAN	
Dead Wake: The Last Crossing of the Lusitania	2015	ISBN 9780307408860	Crown Publishers	Sinking of the RMS Lusitania	Q&A interview with Larson on Dead Wake, March 29, 2015, C-SPAN; Presentation by Larson on Dead Wake, March 27, 2015, C-SPAN; Presentation by Larson on Dead Wake, June 6, 2015, C-SPAN	
The Splendid and the Vile: A Saga of Churchill, Family, and Defiance During the Blitz	2020	ISBN 9780385348713	Penguin Random House	The Blitz, Winston Churchill in the Second World War	Interview with Larson on The Splendid and the Vile, May 5, 2020, C-SPAN	
No One Goes Alone	2021	ISBN 9780593557945	Penguin Random House	William James		Fiction; Audiobook only.
The Demon of Unrest: A Saga of Hubris, Heartbreak, and Heroism at the Dawn of the Civil War	2024	ISBN 9780385348744	Crown Books	American Civil War	Erik Larson On The Dawn Of The Civil War, May 1, 2024, NPR; UNUM Chat: Ken Burns and Erik Larson, May 2024, Ken Burns	
