= Scott Brick =

American audiobook narrator and actor

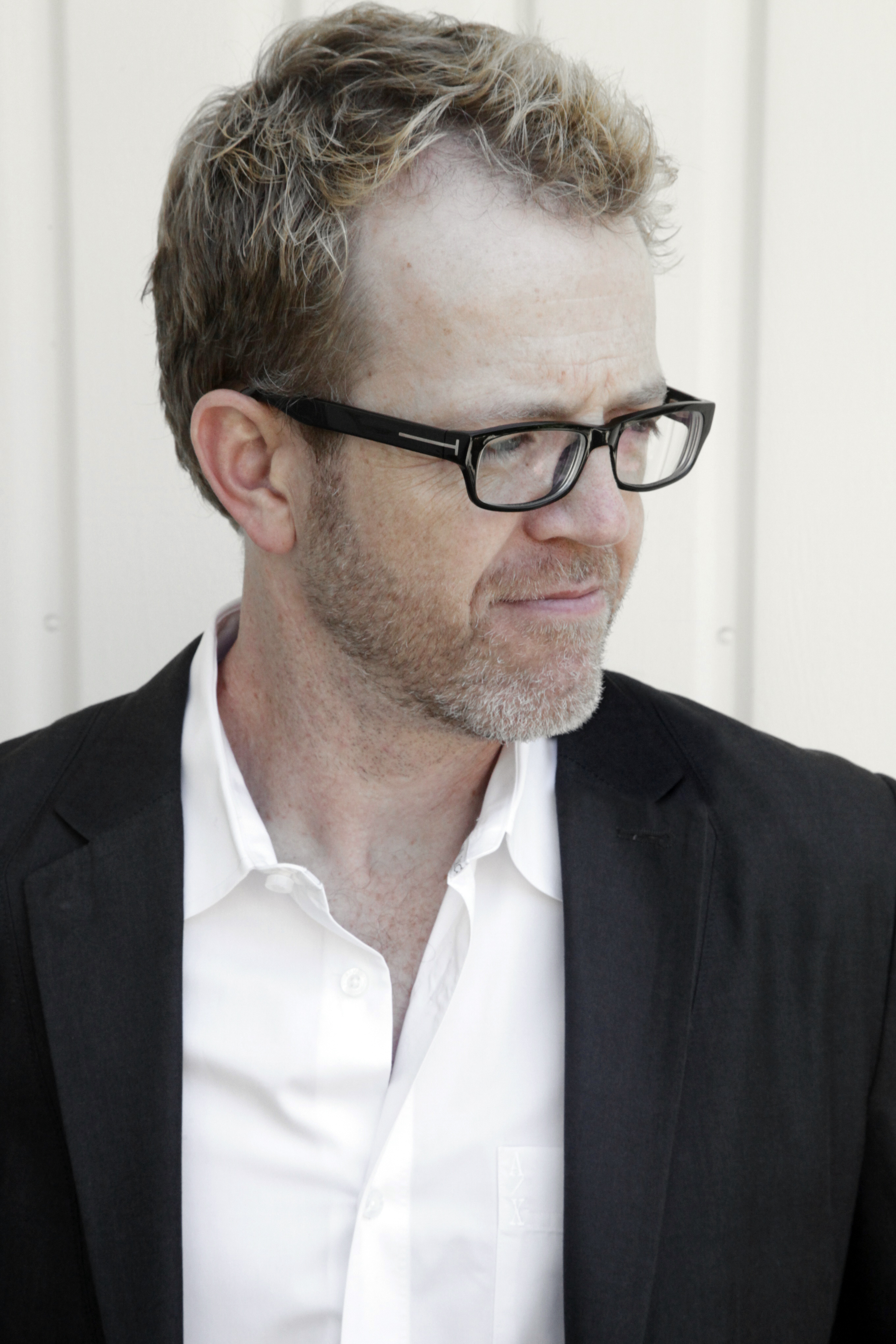
- Audiobook narrator Scott Brick in 2012.
- Born: January 30, 1966 (age 60); Santa Barbara, California, US
- Occupations: Actor, Writer, Narrator
- Years active: 1989 - present
- Website: Scott Brick Presents

Scott Brick (born January 30, 1966, in Santa Barbara, California) is an American actor, writer and award-winning narrator of over 800 audiobooks, including popular titles such as Washington: A Life, Moneyball, and Cloud Atlas. He has narrated works for a number of high-profile authors, including Brad Meltzer, Tom Clancy, Robert Ludlum, Michael Crichton, Clive Cussler and John Grisham.

== Early life ==
Brick studied acting and writing at UCLA before embarking on his professional career in 1989.

== Career ==
=== Audiobooks ===
In 1999, Brick began narrating audiobooks and found himself a popular choice for top publishers and authors. After recording some 250 titles in five years, AudioFile magazine named Brick “one of the fastest-rising stars in the audiobook galaxy," and proclaimed him a "Golden Voice," a reputation solidified by a November 2004 article on the front page of the Wall Street Journal. Publishers Weekly then went on to honor Brick as Narrator of the Year in 2007 and 2011. To date, he has won over 50 Earphone Awards, two Audie Awards and a nomination for a Grammy Award.

He opened his own audiobook recording studio and publishing company, Brick By Brick Audiobooks, with the goals of streamlining production and ensuring consistency throughout his body of work. (Taking a note from DVDs, many of Brick By Brick's titles also include extra features, such as interviews and illustrations.) On May 16, 2008, Brick By Brick Audiobooks released its first title: Lord Foul's Bane, from Stephen R. Donaldson's The Chronicles of Thomas Covenant series. By April 4, 2009, Brick had narrated and released the other two titles in the initial trilogy (The Illearth War and The Power That Preserves), along with Fatal Revenant, the eighth book in the series. When completed, this debut project will result in new unabridged audio narrations of all 10 titles of The Chronicles of Thomas Covenant series. The first trilogy, The Chronicles of Thomas Covenant, the Unbeliever, was released in print from 1977 to 1979; The Second Chronicles of Thomas Covenant was released in print from 1980 to 1983; and The Last Chronicles of Thomas Covenant tetralogy was released in print and audio format from 2004 to 2013.

Brick By Brick Audiobooks has since grown to include the unabridged recordings of M. K. Wren's three-volume The Phoenix Legacy (Sword of the Lamb, Shadow of the Swan and House of the Wolf), as well as literary classics such as Mary Shelley's Frankenstein and Charles Dickens' A Christmas Carol. The CD version of the latter includes four audio discs, as well as a fifth disc of bonus material which includes the original 1843 First Edition illustrations by John Leech (caricaturist) and a photo of Brick playing the role of Ebenezer Scrooge in a 1995 stage production of A Christmas Carol.

In October 2009, Brick compiled and released Gothic Horror: Bloodcurdling Tales from the World’s Greatest Authors, a collection of short stories from authors such as Edgar Allan Poe, H.P. Lovecraft, Mary Shelley and more. Every All Hallow’s Eve hence a new story by a new author will be added to the Gothic Horror library, giving listeners a of classic horror on audio.

Brick cites as his favorite audiobook readings Philip K. Dick's Do Androids Dream of Electric Sheep? (released under the film adaptation's title, Blade Runner) and Budd Schulberg's What Makes Sammy Run? "I would have them back just so I could redo them year after year after year. Because they never get old for me."

=== Stage and cinema ===
Brick spent 10 years with the LA-based traveling Shakespeare troupe Will and Company, performing for schools throughout California. He has appeared as Cyrano, Hamlet, and Macbeth in productions throughout the country. In 2005, he collaborated with author Orson Scott Card to adapt a collection of the author’s short stories for the stage in a production titled Posing as People.

In 2008, Brick appeared in "The Delivery," a short film from Stefan Rudnicki, Gabrielle DeCuir and Skyboat Films starring Efrem Zimbalist, Jr., Michael York, John Rubinstein, Stephanie Zimbalist, Harlan Ellison and Orson Scott Card, among others. The Delivery won First Place in Fantasy at the 2008 Dragon*Con Independent Film Festival. The trailer for The Delivery can be viewed online. In 2010, Brick appeared as Agent Frank Donnolly in the independent film, Hit Parade, written and directed by comic book writer Joe Casey. The trailer for Hit Parade can be viewed online. The DVD can be purchased on Amazon or watched via Amazon Online.

=== Writing ===
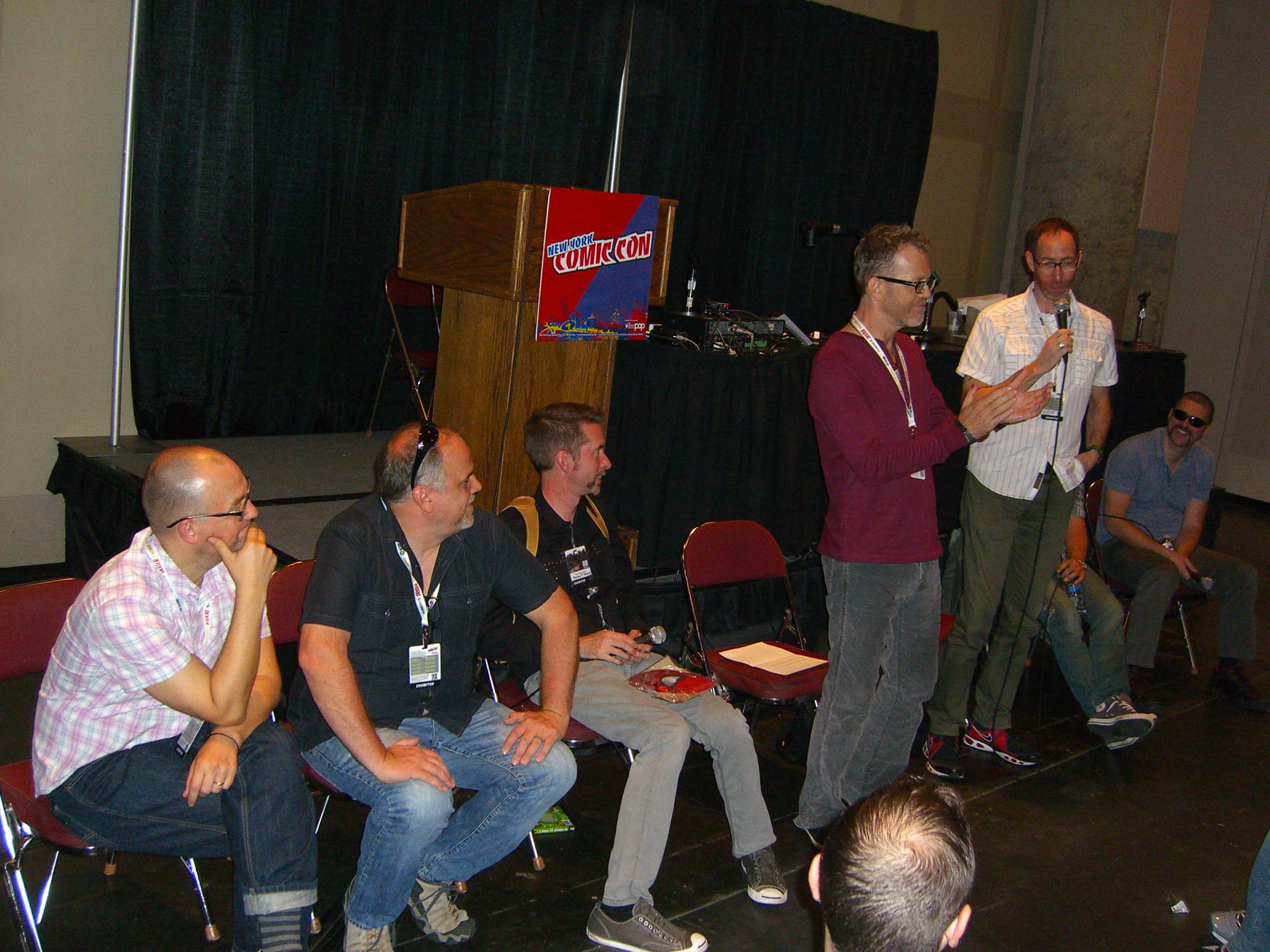
Brick, standing in the red shirt, at the 2012 New York Comic Con.

In 2000, Brick was hired to adapt Arthur C. Clarke’s Rendezvous with Rama for the big screen by Morgan Freeman and Revelations Entertainment with David Fincher attached to direct. Brick has written articles in a variety of comic book, science fiction and toy-related subjects for publications such as Wizard Magazine, ToyFare, Comics Buyer's Guide, Creative Screenwriting and others.

In 2012 Brick completed his first novel, a modern-day supernatural thriller based on an 18th-century murder in New England. He also wrote an instructional guide, Narrating Audiobooks by Scott Brick.

== Awards and honors ==
AudioFile named Brick a Golden Voice narrator.

=== Awards ===
Year	Title	Award	Result	Ref.
2003	Dune: The Butlerian Jihad (2002) by Brian Herbert and Kevin J. Anderson	Audie Award for Science Fiction	Winner	
2004	Darwin's Children (2003) by Greg Bear	Audie Award for Science Fiction	Finalist	
2004	Dune: The Machine Crusade (2003) by Brian Herbert and Kevin J. Anderson	Audie Award for Science Fiction	Finalist	
2006	American Theocracy (2005) by Kevin Phillips	Listen-Up Award for Religion	Finalist	
2006	Cloud Atlas (2004) by David Mitchell	Audie Award for Literary Fiction	Finalist	
2006	In Cold Blood (1966) by Truman Capote	Listen-Up Award for True Crime	Finalist	
2006	Killer Instinct by Joseph Finder	Listen-Up Award for Thriller	Finalist	
2006	Shadow of the Giant (2005) by Orson Scott Card	Audie Award for Science Fiction	Finalist	
2007	Botany of Desire (2001) by Michael Pollan	Listen-Up Award for History & Politics	Finalist	
2007	It’s Superman! by Tom DeHaven	Listen-Up Award for Fantasy	Finalist	
2008	At First Sight by Stephen J. Cannell	Listen-Up Award for Thriller	Finalist	
2008	The Cure for Modern Life by Lisa Tucker	Listen Up Award for Fiction	Finalist	
2008	Dune (1965) by Frank Herbert	Audie Award for Achievement in Production	Finalist	
2008	Dune (1965) by Frank Herbert	Audie Award for Science Fiction	Winner	
2008	Dune (1965) by Frank Herbert	Audie Award for Multi-Voiced Performance	Finalist	
2008	Hellstrom's Hive (1973) by Frank Herbert	Listen Up Award for Science Fiction & Fantasy	Finalist	
2008	Paul of Dune (2008) by Brian Herbert and Kevin J. Anderson	Listen Up Award for Science Fiction & Fantasy	Finalist	
2008	Selections from Dreamsongs 1 (2003) by George R. R. Martin	Audie Award for Science Fiction	Finalist	
2009	METAtropolis by John Scalzi, Elizabeth Bear, Jay Lake, Tobias Buckell, and Karl Schroeder	Audie Award for Original Work	Finalist	
2010	No One Would Listen by Harry Markopolos	Listen Up Award for Nonfiction	Finalist	
2011	The Book of Five Rings by Miyamoto Musashi	Audie Award for Classics	Finalist	
2011		Listen-Up Award for Audiobook Reader of the Year	Winner	
2011	Mayday by Nelson DeMille and Thomas Block	Listen-Up Award for Fiction	Finalist	
2011	Moneyball (2003) by Michael Lewis	Listen-Up Award for Nonfiction	Winner	
2011	No One Would Listen by Harry Markopolos	Audie Award for Nonfiction	Finalist	
2011	Washington: A Life by Ron Chernow	Listen-Up Award for Nonfiction	Finalist	
2013	KJV Audio Bible, Pure Voice by Zondervan Publishing	Audie Award for Faith-Based Fiction and Nonfiction	Finalist	
2014	The Fifth Assassin by Brad Meltzer	Audie Award for Thriller or Suspense	Finalist	
2014	METAtropolis: Green Space by Jay Lake, Elizabeth Bear, Karl Schroeder, Seanan McGuire, Tobias S. Buckell, Mary Robinette Kowal, and Ken Scholes	Audie Award for Original Work	Finalist	
2014	Rip-Off! by John Scalzi, Jack Campbell, Mike Resnick, Allen Steele, Lavie Tidhar, Nancy Kress, and Gardner Dozois	Audie Award for Original Work	Finalist	
2015	Dangerous Women by George R.R. Martin and Gardner Dozois (eds.)	Audie Award for Short Stories or Collections	Finalist	
2015	Report from Nuremberg: The International War Crimes Trial by Harold Burson	Audie Award for Distinguished Achievement in Audio Production	Finalist	
2016	Dead Wake by Erik Larson	Audie Award for Best Male Narrator	Finalist	
2016	Jurassic Park (1990) by Michael Crichton	Audie Award for Science Fiction	Winner	
2016	Jurassic Park (1990) by Michael Crichton	Audie Award for Best Male Narrator	Finalist	
2016	The Patriot Threat by Steve Berry	Audie Award for Thriller or Suspense	Winner	
2016	The Patriot Threat by Steve Berry	Audie Award for Excellence in Production	Finalist	
2016	The President's Shadow by Brad Meltzer	Audie Award for Thriller or Suspense	Finalist	
2017	The Last Tribe by Brad Manuel	Audie Award for Best Male Narrator	Finalist	
2017	Valiant Ambition: George Washington, Benedict Arnold, and the Fate of the American Revolution by Nathaniel Philbrick	Audie Award for History or Biography	Finalist	
2018	Deep Storm (2007) by Lincoln Child	Audie Award for Excellence in Marketing	Finalist	
2018	Mississippi Blood by Greg Iles	Audie Award for Thriller or Suspense	Finalist	
2020	Charlotte's Web (1952) by E. B. White	Audie Award for Middle Grade Title	Winner	
2020	The First Conspiracy by Brad Meltzer and Josh Mensch	Audie Award for History or Biography	Finalist	
2021	The Lincoln Conspiracy by Brad Meltzer and Josh Mensch	Audie Award for History or Biography	Finalist	
2021	The Sentinel by Lee Child and Andrew Child	Audie Award for Thriller or Suspense	Finalist	
2021	Squeeze Me by Carl Hiaasen	Audie Award for Best Male Narrator	Finalist	

=== "Best of" lists ===
Year	Title	List	Ref.
2003	No Second Chance (2003) by Harlan Coben	AudioFile Best of Mystery & Suspense	
2003	Speaker for the Dead	AudioFile Best of Science Fiction	
2004	The Codex (2003) by Douglas Preston	AudioFile Best of Mystery & Suspense	
2004	Shattering Glass (2003) by Gail Giles	ALA Selected Audiobooks for Young Adults	
2005	A Long Way Down (2005) by Nick Hornby	Booklist Editors' Choice: Media	
2006	Acceleration (2005) by Graham McNamee	ALA Selected Audiobooks for Young Adults	
2008	In Defense of Food (2008) by Michael Pollan	AudioFile Best of Contemporary Culture	
2008	Lord Foul’s Bane	AudioFile Best of Fantasy	
2008	Selections from Dreamsongs	AudioFile Best of Fantasy	
2010	Washington: A Life by Ron Chernow	AudioFile Best of Biography & Memoir	
2011	Capitol Game	AudioFile Best of Mystery & Suspense	
2012	Heist	AudioFile Best of Mystery & Suspense	
2012	Superman: The High-Flying History of America's Most Enduring Hero	AudioFile Best of Contemporary Culture	
2015	Dead Wake: The Last Crossing of the ‘Lusitania’ (2005) by Erik Larson	Publishers Weekly Best Nonfiction Audiobooks	
2015	Jurassic Park (1990) by Michael Crichton	Booklist Editors' Choice: Audio for Adults	
2016	The City of Mirrors (2016) by Justin Cronin	AudioFile Best of Science Fiction	
2016	The City On The Edge Of Forever	AudioFile Best of Science Fiction & Fantasy	
2016	Dead Wake: The Last Crossing of the Lusitania (2015) by Erik Larson	RUSA Listen List	
2016	Valiant Ambition: George Washington, Benedict Arnold, and the Fate of the American Revolution	AudioFile Best of Biography & Memoir	
2016	Dead Wake: The Last Crossing of the Lusitania (2015) by Erik Larson	The Listen List: Outstanding Audio Narration	

=== Bestselling audiobooks ===
Year	Title	Ref.
2001	Valhalla Rising by Clive Cussler	
2002	The Millionaires (2002) by Brad Meltzer	
2003	White Death by Clive Cussler with Paul Kemprecos	
2004	Robert Ludlum's The Bourne Legacy by Eric Van Lustbader	
2005	Hour Game by David Baldacci	
2005	Night Fall by Nelson DeMille	
2006	The Divide by Nicholas Evans	
2006	The Book of Fate by Brad Meltzer	
2007	The Alexandria Link by Steve Berry	
2007	The Chase by Clive Cussler	
2007	The Woods by Harlan Coben	
2007	The Navigator by Clive Cussler and Paul Kemprecos	
2008	Arctic Drift by Clive Cussler and Dirk Cussler	
2008	Book of Lies by Brad Meltzer	
2008	Hold Tight by Harlan Coben	
2008	Plague Ship by Clive Cussler with Jack Du Brul	
2009	Corsair by Clive Cussler with Jack DuBrul	
2009	Medusa by Clive Cussler with Paul Kemprecos	
2010	The Silent Sea by Clive Cussler with Jack Du Brul	
