= I Am Albert Einstein =

Book by Brad Meltzer

- Author: Brad Meltzer
- Illustrator: Chris Eliopoulos
- Language: English
- Series: Ordinary People Change the World
- Genre: Children's Book
- Publisher: Dial Books for Young Readers, an imprint of Penguin Group (USA) Inc.
- Publication date: 2014
- Publication place: United States
- Media type: Print (Hardback)
- Pages: 40 pp
- ISBN: 9780803740846
- OCLC: 864709674

I Am Albert Einstein is a 2014 children's book written by Brad Meltzer in the "Ordinary People Change the World" series. It follows the adventures of a young Albert Einstein learning important lessons.

== Plot synopsis ==
The book features a young Albert Einstein, before he discovered the theory of relativity. As a child, young Albert Einstein was given a compass that fascinated him. No matter which way he turned it, it pointed north. The compass had a profound impact on his life. It inspired him to never stop being curious, and never stop discovering.

== I Am Albert Einstein ==
The idea for the "Ordinary People Change the World" series came to Meltzer as he was shopping for his young daughter. All he saw in the racks were many T-shirts with princesses and loud mouth athletes. Meltzer wanted to give his daughter real heroes, ordinary people who stood up for what is right and changed the world. Together with award-winning comics artist Chris Eliopoulos, Meltzer created the "Ordinary People Change the World" children's book series. Each book features the story of a hero when they were a child. The publisher has ordered 12 books in the series.

== Press ==
The book was named the #3 best children's nonfiction book of 2014 by Amazon. When I Am Rosa Parks was released, all previous three books in the "Ordinary People Change the World" series appeared simultaneously on the New York Times Bestseller List: I Am Rosa Parks at #2; I Am Abraham Lincoln at #6; and I Am Amelia Earhart at #8.

Meltzer was featured on many morning news shows to discuss the books, including CBS This Morning.

== See also ==
- Illana Katz, co-author of 1995 children's storybook, In a World of His Own: A Storybook About Albert Einstein
