= Kevin M. Ross =

American academic administrator (born 1973)

President of Lynn University
- Incumbent
- Assumed office July 1, 2006
- Preceded by: Donald E. Ross

Chief operating officer of Lynn University
- In office January 1, 2005 – June 30, 2006
- President: Donald E. Ross

Personal details
- Born: September 6, 1973 (age 52) Palm Beach County, Florida
- Spouse: Kristen Carr (m. 1999)
- Children: 2
- Parent: Donald E. Ross (father)
- Education: Colgate University; St. John's College; Vanderbilt University

Kevin M. Ross (born September 6, 1973 in Palm Beach County) is an American academic administrator. He has served as president of Lynn University since July 1, 2006.

== Biography ==
Ross was born in Florida on September 6, 1973, and was adopted 20 days later by Donald E. Ross and his wife Helen. The Rosses had recently relocated from Delaware so Donald could serve as Lynn University's fourth president. Ross, his sister Ellen, and their parents lived in a three-bedroom apartment above the president's office for many years before relocating to a nearby neighborhood. He graduated from Pope John Paul II High School and received degrees from Colgate University (B.A.), St. John's College (M.A.), and Vanderbilt University (Ph.D. in Higher Education Leadership). He married his wife Kristen in April 1999.

Ross worked at two private high schools in the northeast and spent a period at Wilmington College, which his father had founded in 1967, before joining the staff at Lynn in 1999. He held several roles, including chief operating officer starting on January 1, 2005. During that time, he initiated Lynn 2020, a 15-year plan for the future of the school. On July 1, 2006, shortly after finishing his PhD, he became the institution's fifth president, succeeding his father, who was president for 35 years. He redirected the money set aside for his formal presidential inauguration to establish an Innovation Prize to fund projects benefiting the university.

He was a founding board member of Boca Raton Educational Television and a member of the Literacy Coalition of Palm Beach County Board of Directors, the Saint John Paul II Academy Advisory Board, and the Lynn University Board of Trustees. In 2016, he was elected to the Council of Independent Colleges Board of Directors for a three-year term.
