= I Am Abraham Lincoln =

Book by Brad Meltzer

- Author: Brad Meltzer
- Illustrator: Chris Eliopoulos
- Language: English
- Series: Ordinary People Change the World
- Genre: Novel
- Publisher: Dial Books for Young Readers, an imprint of Penguin Group (USA) Inc.
- Publication date: 2014
- Publication place: United States
- Media type: Print (Hardback)
- Pages: 40 pp
- ISBN: 9780803740839
- OCLC: 843454810

I Am Abraham Lincoln is the first children's book written by Brad Meltzer in the "Ordinary People Change the World" series. It follows the adventures of a young Abraham Lincoln learning important lessons.

== Plot synopsis ==
The 2014 book features a young Abraham Lincoln - before he becomes President - as well as a Lincoln facing the American Civil War and delivering the Gettysburg Address. As a child, young Abraham Lincoln stood up to bullies who were torturing a small turtle.

== Inspiration ==
The idea for the "Ordinary People Change the World" series came to Meltzer as he was shopping for his young daughter. All he saw in the racks were T-shirts with princesses and loud mouth athletes. Meltzer wanted to give his daughter real heroes, ordinary people who stood up for what is right and changed the world. Together with award-winning comics artist Chris Eliopoulos, Meltzer created the "Ordinary People Change the World" children's book series. Each book features the story of a hero when they were a child. The publisher has ordered 12 books in the series.

== Reception ==
Kirkus Reviews found that "Lincoln ... strides through a first-person narrative that stretches the limits of credulity and usefulness." and "Successful neither as biography nor sermon."

== Press ==
With the recent launch of I Am Rosa Parks, all three books in the "Ordinary People Change the World" series appeared simultaneously on the New York Times Bestseller List: I Am Rosa Parks at #2; I Am Abraham Lincoln at #6; and I Am Amelia Earhart at #8.

Meltzer was featured on many morning news shows to discuss the books, including CBS This Morning.
