= Wilmington College =

Wilmington College may refer to:

- Wilmington College (Delaware), now Wilmington University
- University of North Carolina at Wilmington, formerly Wilmington College
- Wilmington College (Ohio)
