= The Book of Lies =

The Book of Lies may refer to:

- The Book of Lies (Crowley), a 1913 title by Aleister Crowley
- The Book of Lies, a 1999 title by Felice Picano
- The Book of Lies: The Disinformation Guide to Magick and the Occult, a 2003 compilation edited by Richard Metzger
- The Book of Lies (Moloney novel), a 2004 title by James Moloney
- The Book of Lies (Meltzer novel), a 2008 title by Brad Meltzer
- Book of Lies (album), a 2008 recording by Australian band End of Fashion
