= House of the Wolf (disambiguation) =

House of the Wolf or The House of the Wolf may refer to:

- The House of the Wolf, an 1890 novel by Stanley J. Weyman
- House of the Wolf (novel), a 1981 novel by M. K. Wren
- The House of the Wolf, a 1983 novel by Basil Copper
- House of the Wolf, a 2010 novel by Ezzat el Kamhawi

== See also ==
- The House of the Wolfings, an 1889 novel by William Morris
- Het Huis van de Wolf, a 1983 novel by Wim Gijsen released in English as The House of the Wolf
- House of the Wolf Man, a 2009 horror film
