= Kevin Ross =

Kevin Ross may refer to:

- Kevin Ross (American football) (born 1962), American football player
- Kevin A. Ross (born 1963), television host of America's Court with Judge Ross
- Kevin M. Ross, academic and president of Lynn University
- Kevin Ross (kickboxer) (born 1980), American kickboxer
- Kevin Ross (musician), American recording artist and songwriter
