= Heroes for My Daughter =

- Author: Brad Meltzer
- Language: English
- Genre: Advice
- Publisher: HarperStudio
- Publication date: 2012
- Publication place: United States
- Media type: Print (Hardback)
- Pages: 144 pp
- ISBN: 9780061905261
- OCLC: 760977817

Heroes for My Daughter is a 2012 non-fiction book written by Brad Meltzer. It contains a series of vignettes on inspiring heroes - famous and lesser known - whose stories Brad wanted to share with his daughter. It is the follow-up to the bestselling 2010 book Heroes for My Son. According to WorldCat, the book is in 558 libraries.

== Contents ==
The book contains vignettes, quotations, and black and white photos of Meltzer's heroes, with details on why their character and values are special: Marie Curie, teammates Mallory Holtman and Liz Wallace, Joan Ganz Cooney, Audrey Hepburn, Helen Keller, Christopher Reeve, Carol Burnett, Amelia Earhart, Alex Scott, Abigail Adams, Anne Frank, Dorothy Day, Judy Blume, Sacajawea, Theodore Roosevelt, Julia Child, Golda Meir, Stevie Wonder, Nancy G. Brinker, Clara Barton, Sheila Spicer (the author's grade 9 teacher), Winston Churchill, Lisa Simpson, Eleanor Roosevelt, Tina Turner, The Three Stooges, Wangari Maathai, Agatha Christie, Leonardo da Vinci, Dolly Parton, Sojourner Truth, Branch Rickey, Lucille Ball, Elizabeth Blackburn, Ella Fitzgerald, Mahatma Gandhi, Mary Shelley, Rochelle Lee Shoretz, Tank Man, Billie Jean King, The heroes of United Flight 93, Temple Grandin, Rosa Parks, Jane Goodall, The 14th Dalai Lama, Abraham Lincoln, Thurgood Marshall, Dorothea Lange, Hannah Senesh, Randy Pausch, Sally Ride, Benjamin Franklin, Wilma Rudolph, Dottie Rubin, Teri Meltzer and Cori Flam Meltzer (the author's maternal grandmother, mother and wife, respectively).

== Press ==
The book reached #6 on the New York Times bestseller list.
