= I Am Rosa Parks =

2014 picture book by Brad Meltzer

- Author: Brad Meltzer
- Illustrator: Chris Eliopoulos
- Language: English
- Series: Ordinary People Change the World
- Genre: Children's Book
- Publisher: Dial Books for Young Readers, an imprint of Penguin Group (USA) Inc.
- Publication date: 2014
- Publication place: United States
- Media type: Print (Hardback)
- Pages: 40 pp
- ISBN: 9780803740853
- OCLC: 858749395

I Am Rosa Parks is a 2014 children's picture book written by Brad Meltzer in the 'Ordinary People Change the World' series. It follows the adventures of a young Rosa Parks learning important lessons.

== Plot synopsis ==
The book features a young Rosa Parks, before inspired the Montgomery bus boycott. As a child, young Rosa Parks was shoved by a white boy, even though she was just minding her own business. She shoved the boy back. She knew fighting was wrong, but she didn't want the boy picking on her again. The boy's mother yelled at her, but Rosa stood her ground and explained that the boy had pushed her even though she had not bothered him at all. This experience teaches her to stand up for herself and for what is right.

== Inspiration ==
The idea for the "Ordinary People Change the World" series came to Meltzer as he was shopping for his young daughter. All he saw in the racks were T-shirts with princesses and loud mouth athletes. Meltzer wanted to give his daughter and sons real heroes, ordinary people who stood up for what is right and changed the world. Together with award-winning comics artist Chris Eliopoulos, Meltzer created the "Ordinary People Change the World" children's book series. Each book features the story of a hero when they were a child. The publisher has ordered 12 books in the series.

== Press ==
With the recent launch of I Am Rosa Parks, all three books in the "Ordinary People Change the World" series appeared simultaneously on the New York Times Bestseller List: I Am Rosa Parks at #2; I Am Abraham Lincoln at #6; and I Am Amelia Earhart at #8.

Meltzer was featured on many morning news shows to discuss the books, including CBS This Morning.

== Reception ==
Kirkus Reviews calls it "A barely serviceable introduction with far more child appeal than substance." while Publishers Weekly finds that "Moments of humor help balance out the harsh racial prejudice on display,."
