= I Am Amelia Earhart =

2014 children's book by Brad Meltzer

- Author: Brad Meltzer
- Illustrator: Chris Eliopoulos
- Language: English
- Series: Ordinary People Change the World
- Genre: Children's Book
- Publisher: Dial Books for Young Readers, an imprint of Penguin Group (USA) Inc.
- Publication date: 2014
- Publication place: United States
- Media type: Print (Hardback)
- Pages: 40 pp
- ISBN: 9780803740822
- OCLC: 843124156

I Am Amelia Earhart is a 2014 children's book written by Brad Meltzer in the "Ordinary People Change the World" series. It follows the adventures of a young Amelia Earhart learning important lessons.

== Plot synopsis ==
The book features a young Amelia Earhart, before she became the first female aviator to fly solo across the Atlantic Ocean. As a child, young Amelia Earhart built a makeshift roller coaster in her backyard, using planks of wood and a wooden crate. She crashed. It was loud. It was noisy. It was the first time she flew, but it would not be her last. This experience teaches her that not to accept the limits others, society, and even gravity place on her.

== Inspiration ==
The idea for the "Ordinary People Change the World" series came to Meltzer as he was shopping for his young daughter. All he saw in the racks were T-shirts with princesses and loud mouth athletes. Meltzer wanted to give his daughter real heroes, ordinary people who stood up for what is right and changed the world. Together with award-winning comics artist Chris Eliopoulos, Meltzer created the "Ordinary People Change the World" children's book series. Each book features the story of a hero when they were a child. The publisher has ordered 12 books in the series.

== Reception ==
Kirkus Reviews found "The ever-popular pioneering female pilot gets a breezy and very incomplete biography." while Publishers Weekly call it an "entertaining and inspiring primer, though source notes are absent."

== Press ==
With the recent launch of I Am Rosa Parks, all three books in the "Ordinary People Change the World" series appeared simultaneously on the New York Times Bestseller List: I Am Rosa Parks at #2; I Am Abraham Lincoln at #6; and I Am Amelia Earhart at #8.

Meltzer was featured on many morning news shows to discuss the books, including CBS This Morning.
