= Illana Katz =

American author and lecturer

- Born: May 30, 1946 (age 80); New York City, U.S.
- Occupation: Author
- Spouse: David Katz

Illana Katz (born 1946) is an American author, lecturer, and founder of Real Life Storybooks, a publisher of special needs storybooks for children. Motivated by the late 1980s news that her son Seth had autism, Katz began to educate herself about autism, including researching into the life of theoretical physicist Albert Einstein. After writing Joey and Sam: A Heartwarming Storybook About Autism, a Family, and a Brother's Love in 1993, circumstances led Katz to write Sarah, a 1994 book about child molestation. By 1995 Katz and her collaborator, UCLA professor Edward Ritvo, had gathered enough material to write their 1995 book, In a World of His Own: A Storybook About Albert Einstein, in which they concluded that Einstein did have autism. Katz continues to work in the special needs profession.

== History ==
In the late 1980s, Katz's son Seth (b. 1986) was diagnosed with autism. Katz equated the autism diagnosis with death, "You suffer the death of your expectations for your child." After overcoming her devastation and finding little written material on autism, Katz began speaking with others in the field and going to meetings. This gave her the details to write books about children, autism, and their vulnerability as a way to become more involved, more in control, and to make decisions for her son.

In 1992, Katz lived in West Hills, California and began collaborating on a book about autism with Dr. Edward Ritvo, a professor of Medicine at University of California, Los Angeles. The book, entitled "Joey and Sam: A Heartwarming Storybook About Autism, a Family, and a Brother's Love" and published in 1993, was focused on explaining autism to 4- to 8-year-olds. Later that year, Katz founded Real Life Storybooks, a publisher of special needs storybooks for children.

=== Misdialed calls ===
In September 1993, Katz installed a nationwide 800 number at Real Life Storybooks, where people could ask questions and directly order storybooks about real-life situations. The 800 number was one number off from another that led to a nationwide hot line designed to prevent child abuse. Katz often received misdialed child abuse calls. Despite her informing the callers that they had dialed a wrong number, the callers often continued, relating stories such as a father who wanted Katz's input on the potential harm "if he were to rape his 4-month-old daughter lying naked next to him" and a "mother of a 9-month-old who was convinced the child was trying to "get her goat" by crying." Eventually, Katz changed the 800 number per the request of the purveyors of the child abuse hotline, reasoning that "I changed my 800 number because I was asked to do so, so the callers could get the help they needed."

The misdialed phone calls had a profound effect on Katz. She began writing Sarah, a 1994 fictional book that details efforts of a girl who received the help of Doctor Good to find the strength to tell about her molestation by her Uncle Jack. During this time, she also was influenced by a January 1994 award of $2 million to a girl who was molested.

=== Additional autism efforts ===
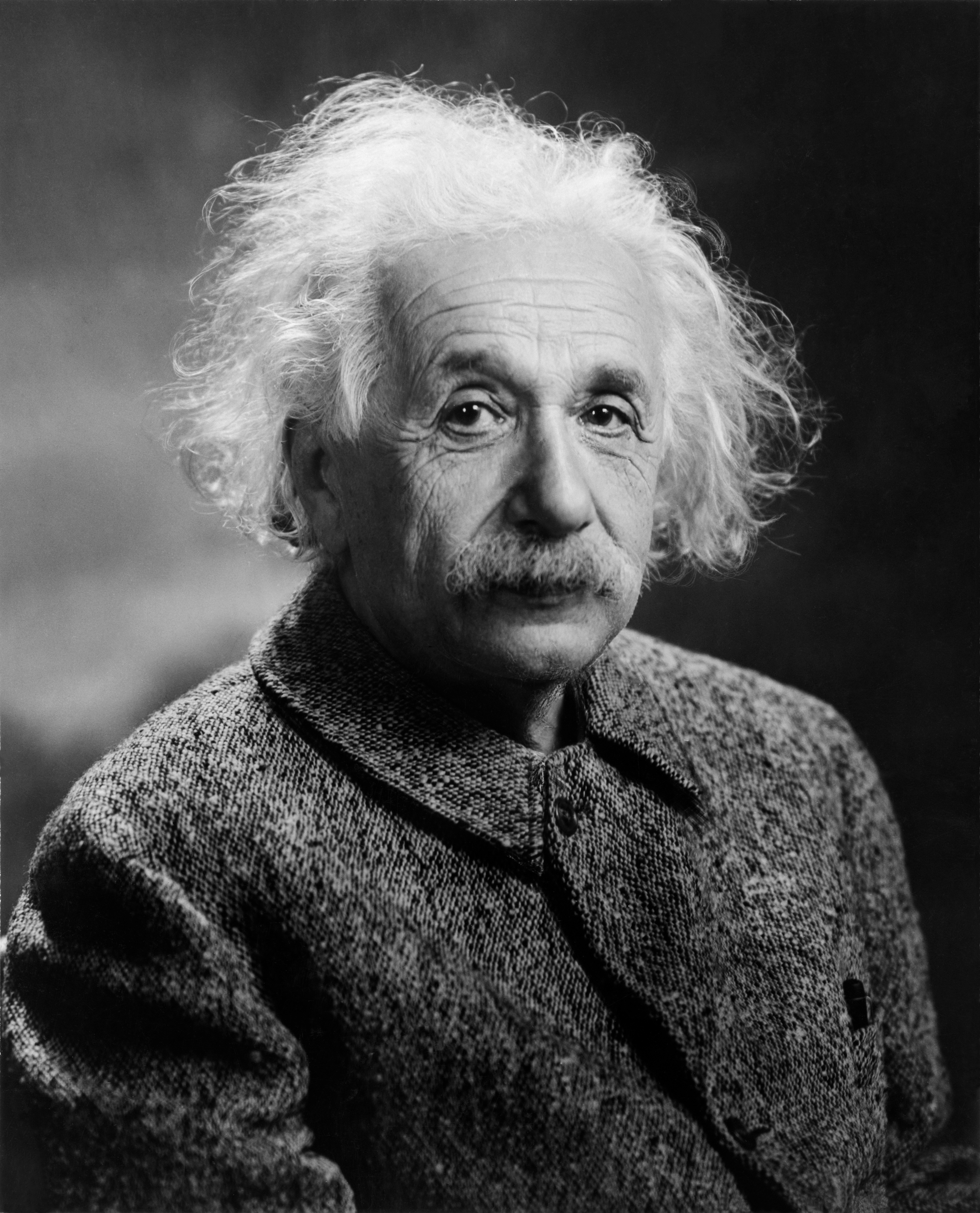
Theoretical physicist Albert Einstein, the subject of Katz's 1995 book, "In a World of His Own: A Storybook About Albert Einstein."

While addressing issues of child abuse, Katz continued in her efforts to address child disabilities. In March 1994, Katz explained the motivation behind her efforts:

"With my books, I'm trying to prevent kids from making fun of children with disabilities, being cruel because they don't know any better. That's why I'm writing. Not only to teach children about the disabilities or the diseases, but to help them grow up to be better, more caring people. Lord knows, we could use all we can get. Is it naive on my part? Probably. Am I going to try anyway? Of course."

By this time, Katz had spent six years researching the life of theoretical physicist Albert Einstein, the last two years being a collaboration with Dr. Edward Ritvo. In their research, Katz and Ritvo discovered that Einstein's parents had been very worried about him when he was a baby. Born with an unusually large head similarly to many children with autism, Einstein's grandparents thought he was a dolt, in part because he was a late talker and did poorly in school. Einstein additionally "was a loner, solitary, suffered from major tantrums, had no friends and didn't like being in crowds." In 1995, Katz and Ritvo published their 1995 book, In a World of His Own: A Storybook About Albert Einstein. In In a World of His Own, Katz and Ritvo review the life of Albert Einstein in view of the features of the autistic spectrum to conclude that Einstein did have autism.

== Personal information ==
Katz presently works with Yellen & Associates, a provider of psychological, educational, speech and language services for children of special needs. Katz is married to David Katz and together, they have four children, the youngest of whom has autism.

== Achievements and honours ==
She is the recipient of the Authors' and Celebrities' "Award of Excellence" and Irwin Award.

== See also ==
- I Am Albert Einstein, 2014 children's book
