= A Gift Upon the Shore =

1990 novel by M. K. Wren

- First edition cover
- Author: M. K. Wren
- Language: English
- Genre: post-apocalyptic fiction
- Publisher: Ballantine Books
- Publication date: February 3, 1990
- Publication place: United States
- Media type: Print (Hardback & Paperback)
- ISBN: 0-345-36341-8 (first edition, hardback)
- OCLC: 20015052
- Dewey Decimal: 813/.54 20
- LC Class: PS3573.R43 G5 1990

A Gift Upon the Shore is a post-apocalyptic fiction novel by American author M. K. Wren and published by Ballantine Books in 1990. The story follows two American women, an artist and a writer, who survive pandemic, the collapse of civilization, and a deadly nuclear winter.

== Plot summary ==
Set in the near future, A Gift traces the first generations to survive nuclear war and its aftermath. Writer Mary Hope and painter Rachel Morrow scratch out a meager existence on a farm called Amarna on the Oregon coast. They are determined to collect and preserve for a new civilization all the great books of western culture. Farther down the coast lives the Arkites, a fundamentalist group that denies all knowledge not found in the Bible. After a plague strikes the Arkites Mary agrees to take in a few survivors on the condition that she be allowed to educate the children as she sees fit.

== Reception ==
Publishers Weekly called the novel "unsparing but ultimately hopeful...Wren's post-nuclear world rings true, as do her compelling depictions of the subsistence-level daily life--the triumphs, the losses and the desperation." Kirkus Reviews dubbed the novel as "Beautifully realized, with solid characters, but unoriginal, obvious, implausible, obtrusively symbolic, and far too slow in the development: more admirable than practical." The Los Angeles Times commented: "This cautionary novel is scarier than anything by Stephen King or Clive Barker...Wren’s writing is clear and concise for the most part, though bordering on the mystic when it comes to her descriptions of the woods, and especially the ocean in its many moods."
