= History Decoded: The 10 Greatest Conspiracies of All Time =

Non-fiction book by Brad Meltzer about conspiracies

- Author: Brad Meltzer with Keith Ferrell
- Language: English
- Genre: Nonfiction
- Published: 2013 Workman Publishing Company
- Publication place: United States
- Media type: Print (Hardback)
- Pages: 160 pp
- ISBN: 9780761177456
- OCLC: 836261483

History Decoded: The 10 Greatest Conspiracies of All Time is a 2013 non-fiction book by Brad Meltzer. It contains a series of investigations into history’s greatest conspiracies. Included in the book at the introduction to each chapter is an envelope that holds facsimiles of relevant evidence: John Wilkes Booth's alleged unsigned will, a map of the Vatican, John F. Kennedy's death certificate. It is a companion to the show Brad Meltzer's Decoded on History Channel. According to WorldCat, the book is in 896 libraries.

== Contents ==
The book contains investigation into the following mysteries:

- "John Wilkes Booth: Was Lincoln's Assassin Apprehended?"
- "Confederate Gold: Stolen Treasure or Hidden Wealth of a New Confederacy?"
- "The Georgia Guidestones: America's Stonehenge"
- "DB Cooper: American Outlaw"
- "The White House: Where is the Cornerstone of Democracy?"
- "The Spear of Destiny: History's Most Sacred Relic"
- "The Real Da Vinci Code: Did Leonardo Predict an Apocalypse?"
- "Is there any Gold in Fort Knox?"
- "UFOs: Inside Roswell and Area 51"
- "The Kennedy Assassination: the Truth is out There."
