= Brad Meltzer's Decoded =

- Genre: Investigation; Mystery
- Presented by: Brad Meltzer
- Starring: Scott Rolle; Christine McKinley; Buddy Levy
- Country of origin: United States
- Original language: English
- No. of seasons: 2
- No. of episodes: 23

Production
- Executive producers: Gary Auerbach; Julie Auerbach; Gail Berman, Lloyd Braun; Gene Stein; Russ McCarroll
- Camera setup: Multiple
- Running time: 45 minutes (w/o commercials)
- Production companies: Go Go Luckey and Berman/Braun

Original release
- Network: History
- Release: December 2, 2010 – January 20, 2012

Brad Meltzer's Decoded (or simply Decoded) is an American investigative television series focused on historical mysteries and alleged conspiracy theories, produced by Go Go Luckey and Berman/Braun, that premiered December 2, 2010, on the History Channel. The series is hosted by Brad Meltzer, an author of political thriller novels and non-fiction works, and follows a team of investigators who try to determine the meanings behind various symbolism, alleged secret codes and conspiracies that surround us every day. History Decoded, a book by Meltzer that was inspired by the show, was published in October 2013.

== Cast ==
- Brad Meltzer – author and investigator
- Scott Rolle – U.S. Army Reserves LTC and trial judge
- Christine McKinley – mechanical engineer and writer
- Buddy Levy – English professor, author and journalist

== Reception ==
The New York Times reviewer Ginia Bellafante gave Decoded a critical review, writing, "[there] are the languorous crackpots who wonder if codes are embedded in their Home Depot receipts, or if George Washington's wooden leg hid an alternate Constitution. It is for this group that the series Brad Meltzer's Decoded has been conceived" but says, "Decoded, though, at least returns the History channel to history" after its forays into reality TV such as Ice Road Truckers and Ax Men.

PopMatters.com compares aspects of Decoded to Conspiracy Theory with Jesse Ventura stating it has "some broadly questionable research and conclusions, all developed and pursued 'in the moment', to give Decoded that sort of you-are-there-for-this-grand-adventure feel."

== Episodes ==
=== Season 1 (2010–11) ===
No.	Title	Original release date
101 (1)	"The White House"	December 2, 2010
Brad and team continue the 200-year search for the mysterious White House cornerstone. Supposedly laid down in 1792 by members of the secretive Freemasons, records are sketchy on the history of this stone which has been sought after by those such as Harry S. Truman and Barbara Bush.
102 (2)	"Secret Presidential Codes"	December 9, 2010
Brad and team investigate the suspicious suicide of one of the world's greatest explorers, Meriwether Lewis, (of Lewis and Clark fame), who may have died while in possession of secret codes for president Thomas Jefferson and clues that his death may have been an assassination.
103 (3)	"Statue of Liberty"	December 16, 2010
Brad and team study the iconic Statue of Liberty, a symbol of freedom and prosperity, or so it seems until they uncover symbolism on the structure that may reflect a more sinister meaning and its significance to the "power number" of "7".
104 (4)	"The Lincoln Assassination"	December 23, 2010
Brad and team look into 150-year-old rumors that John Wilkes Booth wasn't killed 12 days after he assassinated President Abraham Lincoln, but escaped with the help of a look-alike and aided by the Confederate military to go on to live another 40 years.
105 (5)	"Confederate Gold"	December 30, 2010
Brad and team try to decipher secret messages and cryptic maps left behind by the mysterious "Knights of the Golden Circle" who may have hid millions of dollars' worth of silver and gold from the Confederate treasury in secret caches across America.
106 (6)	"D.B. Cooper"	January 6, 2011
Brad and team investigate evidence focusing on suspect Kenneth Christiansen, that he may have been hijacker D. B. Cooper, who in 1971, bailed out of an airliner at 10,000 feet over Washington state, with $200,000 in ransom money and was never seen again – the only unsolved plane hijacking in U.S. history.
107 (7)	"2012"	January 13, 2011
Brad and team work to decipher the meanings behind numerous ancient prophecies, from the predictions of Nostradamus, to Hopi and Mayan legends, to Muslim and Christian texts, to even predictions made by an internet analysis program called the Web Bot, that supposedly warn of worldwide destruction in the year 2012.
108 (8)	"The President's Inner Circle"	January 20, 2011
Brad and team look into the history and the people involved in the Culper Spy Ring – a covert team of ordinary citizens; shopkeepers, tavern owners and housewives – who played a vital role in helping save the United States by spying on the British during the Revolutionary War, over 200 years ago.
109 (9)	"Secret Societies"	January 27, 2011
Brad sends his team in to penetrate the Bohemian Grove – a secretive and tightly guarded gathering of the elite in a Northern California redwood forest, to pursue rumors of bizarre rituals, sacrifices and secret meetings said to influence the lives of everyday Americans. Joining them is conspiracy talk radio host Alex Jones who secretly video taped a grove ritual in July 2000.
110 (10)	"Apocalypse in Georgia"	February 3, 2011
Brad's team goes to Elberton, Georgia to investigate the Georgia Guidestones – a granite monument commissioned by a mysterious individual, "R.C. Christian", (who is suspected to be part of the Rosicrucian sect), whereupon multilingual messages are written that some suggest are plans to rebuild civilization after an apocalyptic disaster.

=== Season 2 (2011–12) ===
No.	Title	Original release date
201 (11)	"Ft. Knox"	October 5, 2011
Brad's investigators look at one of the most secure places on Earth – the Bullion Depository at Fort Knox, where the U.S. Government reportedly keeps 147.3 million ounces (over 4,600 tons) of gold. Because there has not been a public audit of the gold since 1974 however, the team looks into rumors that the vault is now empty, and if true, it could devastate the nation's economy.
202 (12)	"Declaration of Independence"	October 12, 2011
Brad's team looks into various mysteries surrounding the Declaration of Independence, such as whether or not the document on display at the U.S. National Archives is the original copy; that the document wasn't authored by Thomas Jefferson, but instead Thomas Paine; and the document was used as a cipher for the Beale Papers which supposedly leads to $65 million in pirate gold.
203 (13)	"Mount Rushmore"	October 19, 2011
Brad and team investigate allegations that the sculptor who created the Mount Rushmore monument, Gutzon Borglum, was a member of the Ku Klux Klan, and that his monument represents white supremacy and not U.S. patriotism. They also learn that the evidence could be hidden within the "Hall of Records" – a time-capsule area located behind the monument that is off limits to the public.
204 (14)	"Patton"	October 26, 2011
Brad's team looks into the 1945 death of controversial WWII General George S. Patton, who died suddenly while recovering from injuries he sustained during an automobile accident in Germany. They also investigate rumors that the general may have been murdered by the Russians, or by an assassin working for the OSS under the orders of future president Dwight D. Eisenhower.
205 (15)	"Spear of Destiny"	November 16, 2011
Brad's team investigates the possible locations of the Holy Lance alleged to have been used during the crucifixion of Jesus and looks into the rumored obsession Adolf Hitler had in gaining possession of the spear.
206 (16)	"Billy the Kid"	November 23, 2011
Brad and team look into the life and adventures of Billy the Kid and addresses the century-old debate of whether or not the legendary outlaw was shot dead by lawman Pat Garrett in 1881, or that he might have escaped and went on to live a longer life.
207 (17)	"UFO"	November 30, 2011
Brad's team interview members of the military and aviation organizations who have come forward to break their silence about their encounters with UFOs. From the famous Roswell UFO incident to Area 51, the team tries to piece together evidence of an alleged government coverup regarding the existence of extraterrestrial beings.
208 (18)	"Da Vinci"	December 7, 2011
Brad and team examine the life of legendary artist and engineer Leonardo da Vinci and look into the rumors that he hid cryptic prophecies in his work that are so dire, they were hidden away by the Catholic Church. To understand the mind of Da Vinci, the team looks at his controversial political views, his obsession with death, and the mysterious identity of Mona Lisa.
209 (19)	"2012: It Has Begun"	December 14, 2011
Brad and team study more apocalyptic prophecies of 2012 and look at evidence that they may be coming true. From ancient Mayan legends to the texts of King James Bible, the team tries to answer if doomsday is upon us and what we can look forward to on December 21, 2012.
210 (20)	"Mafia: Alive?"	December 21, 2011
Brad and team look into the history of the Mafia, beginning with Al Capone and his Chicago Outfit to Whitey Bulger and the Irish Mob. They also look into evidence that Mafia is still around, but has evolved into something more powerful; such as Mexican drug cartels bringing violence to American soil and the "cybermafia" – a gang of high-tech criminals who steal money and identities over the internet.
211 (21)	"Vatican"	December 28, 2011
Brad's team goes to Rome to investigate rumors that the Vatican may have been involved in the death of one of their own, Pope John Paul I, who was in power for only 33 days before he was found dead of mysterious causes. They look into a possible cover up that he was about to expose a banking scandal involving the Freemasons and the Mafia operating inside the Vatican itself.
212 (22)	"Houdini: Murdered?"	January 4, 2012
Brad's team researches the life of legendary magician and escape artist Harry Houdini, who died after a trick went fatally wrong, and looks into suspicions that his death was no accident, but an act of murder. To gain more insight, the team makes a list of possible suspects and motives, and uncovers Houdini's backstage life of love affairs, family feuds, and rumored involvement in international espionage.
213 (23)	"Devil's Graveyard, Alaska"	January 20, 2012
Brad and team investigate an area between Anchorage, Juneau and Barrow, Alaska, dubbed "Alaska's Bermuda Triangle," which has a disappearance rate sixteen times the national average. The team interviews local villagers, rescue workers and victim's families and listens to their theories as to why so many ships, planes and people have vanished here without a trace.
