= Literacy Coalition of Palm Beach County =

Organizations based in Florida

- Founded: 1989
- Type: 501(c)(3)
- Purpose: Literacy
- Location: Boynton Beach, Florida
- Website: Literacy Coalition of Palm Beach County

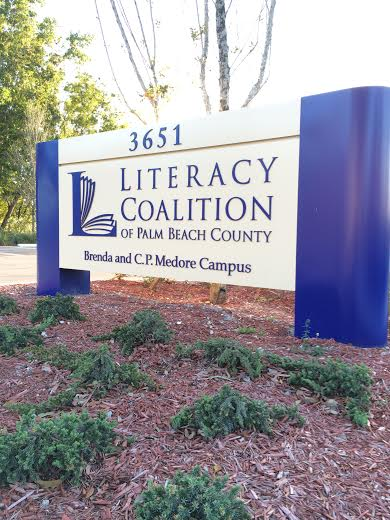
Literacy Coalition of Palm Beach County

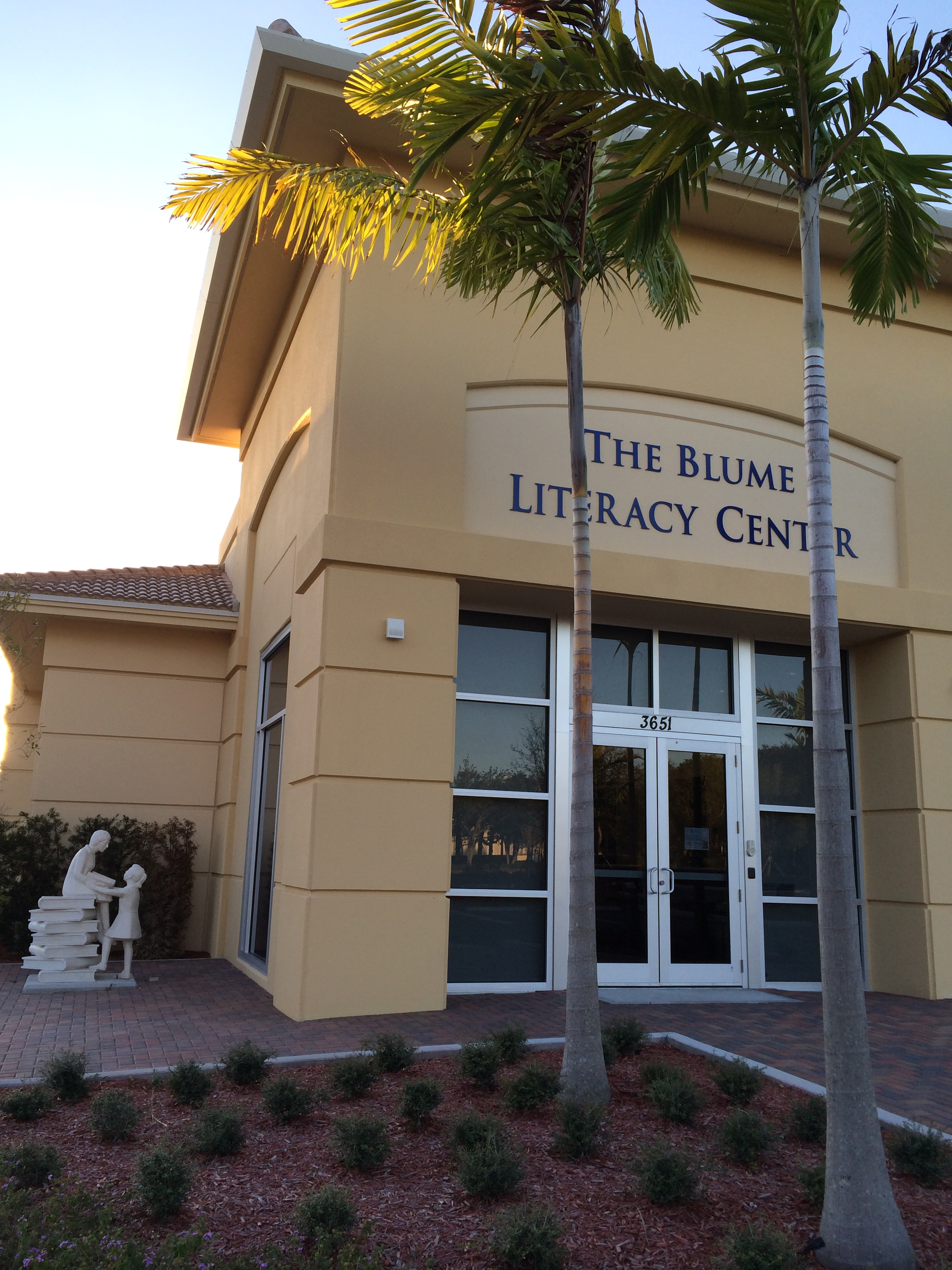
The Blume Literacy Center

The Literacy Coalition of Palm Beach County is a nonprofit organization headquartered in Boynton Beach, Florida, United States. Its stated mission is to improve literacy in Palm Beach County. One in seven adults in Palm Beach County is unable to read and understand information found in books, newspapers, magazines, brochures and manuals. The organization's operates with the assistance of over 9,000 volunteers. In 2013, the Literacy Coalition provided services to more than 25,000 adults, to children and families.

== History ==
Representatives of business, government, libraries, the school district, the media, literacy providers and other community groups established the Literacy Coalition of Palm Beach County in 1989. In 1990, a Literacy Hotline was established as a single contact point for volunteer tutors and adult learners. In 1991, the first Love of Literacy luncheon fundraiser was held. In 1997, Literacy AmeriCorps began with funding from the Corporation for Community and National Service for the purpose of recruiting, training, placing, and supervising members to perform literacy tutoring with adults, children, youth and families throughout Palm Beach County. Also in 1997, the Literacy Coalition participated in the America Reads Pilot Program, as one of 15 national sites to involve volunteers with reading to at-risk elementary and preschool children. The organization has maintained involvement with initiatives including Care to Read, Early Reading First, Reach Out and Read, Read Together Palm Beach County, Village Readers Program, through which thousands of Palm Beach County residents have benefited.

== Community partners ==
Community partners include Ann Norton Sculpture Gardens, ASPIRA, Adopt-a-Family of the Palm Beaches, Barbara Bush Foundation for Family Literacy, Boys Town South Florida, Center for Family Services of Palm Beach County, Children's Services Council of Palm Beach County, City of Boynton Beach, City of Delray Beach, City of Greenacres, City of West Palm Beach, Cultural Council of Palm Beach County, Farmworker Children's Council, Guatemalan-Maya Center, Gulfstream Goodwill's Transitions to Life Academy, Health Care District of Palm Beach County, Hispanic Human Resources, Lynn University, Max M. Fisher Boys and Girls Club, Norton Museum of Art, Salvation Army, Palm Beach Atlantic College, Palm Beach State College, School District of Palm Beach County, Take Stock in Children, United Way of Palm Beach County, Quantum Foundation, WXEL TV 42, and YMCA of Boynton Beach. Partnerships with local municipal and county libraries have been established with Boca Raton Public Library, Boynton Beach City Library, Mandel Public Library of West Palm Beach, and the Palm Beach County Library System.

== Events ==
The Love of Literacy Luncheon began as the annual awareness and fundraising event. Speakers have included former First Lady Barbara Bush, Danny Glover, Henry Winkler, Wally Amos, Walter Anderson, LeVar Burton, retired Senator Paul Simon, Sean Astin, Melissa Gilbert, Ben Carson, Ann Patchett, Byron Pitts, Linda Wirthheimer, Pat Conroy, and Brad Meltzer.

Loop the Lake for Literacy is a fundraising and advocacy event hosted by the Literacy Coalition of Palm Beach County. Participating bike riders follow a course along Lake Okeechobee's outer banks. The ride is one of the coalition's most successful fundraising events.

The American Girl Fashion Show is an event which raises money for the coalition's education programs tailored to children, youth, and adults. Models provide an educational look at how generations of American girls have used clothing to express their own unique style and personality.

== Programs ==
=== Adult Literacy ===
The Outreach Program promotes adult literacy programmes and recruits adult learners and volunteer tutors throughout Palm Beach County. Adults who require basic literacy skills, English proficiency, and/or subject mastery in order to pass the GED test are targeted. In partnership with the School District of Palm Beach County, the Palm Beach County Library System Adult Literacy Project and a number of community-based organizations, the Literacy Coalition connects adult learners and volunteer tutors with local literacy programs.

=== Budding Readers ===
Budding Readers is an early literacy program that matches three-year-old children at child care centers with a Reading Partner for a weekly one-to-one interactive reading session. Reading Partners are intended to nurture the blossoming of these "budding readers" into lifelong lovers of books, reading, and learning, as they work with them to develop early literacy skills. As of 2012, 16 Reading Partners at partnership sites served 417 children, 91 percent of the children demonstrated development in early literacy skills needed for future success in school, and 4,917 books were distributed to children to begin a home library.

=== Workplace and Community Education ===
The Workplace and Community Education Program provides customized instruction for adults who need help improving their English language skills, obtaining a GED, or addressing specific workplace needs. Classes are provided at workplace and community sites throughout the county by trained adult education instructors. Classes are tailored to each particular site and the skill levels of the students. The adult students, who attend classes twice a week, develop literacy skills to prepare them for enhanced employment opportunities and/or future education.

=== Read Together Palm Beach County ===
This community reading campaign involves 10,000 - 20,000 adults throughout Palm Beach County reading the same book at the same time. This encourages adults who can read, but often do not, to get involved in the habit of reading again. It promotes community dialogue and engagement as citizens gather together to discuss key themes. Former Governor Jeb Bush wrote to every city in Florida and encouraged them to form "One Book, One Community" reading campaigns based on the Palm Beach County model. Read Together Palm Beach County produced a handbook on how to conduct a similar reading campaign, and former Governor Bush urged municipalities to use this book to guide them in their campaigns. Participants include businesses, libraries, chambers of commerce, municipalities, local book clubs, neighborhood associations, and many other groups.

=== Pink Shirt Day ===
The Literacy Coalition, in conjunction with Prime Time Palm Beach County, both of which receive significant funding from the Children's Services Council of Palm Beach County, encourage afterschool programs across the county to participate with their own on-site celebrations of how bystanders can make a difference when it comes to bullying.

== Recognition ==
In March 2012, the Quantum Foundation honored the Literacy Coalition with a "Change Leader" award for its service to the community through the Literacy AmeriCorps program. The Palm Beach County School District has honored the coalition with the Above and Beyond Award, and Business Partnership Award, for its work with children attending elementary schools in disadvantaged district neighborhoods. In 2005, the Literacy Coalition was one of 78 organizations selected nationally for the Bank of America Foundation's Neighborhood Builder Award for exhibiting "the highest standard in community building." The Children's Services Council of Palm Beach County awarded the group its annual Striving for Excellence Award, in recognition of its outstanding governance and administration. The Literacy Coalition has earned five consecutive 4-star ratings from Charity Navigator. The Literacy Coalition was also among the first agencies to be certified by Nonprofits First, a Palm Beach County group advocating for efficiency in area nonprofit organization.
