= Saint John Paul II Academy =

- Front lawn of Saint John Paul II Academy (formerly Pope John Paul II High School) in 2009

Location
- 4001 North Military Trail; Boca Raton, Florida 33431; United States; 26°23′16″N 80°7′24″W

Information
- Former name: Pope John Paul II High School
- Type: Private Roman Catholic Colledge Prepatory School
- Motto: Latin: Fundamentum Christus Iesus; English: Founded on Jesus Christ Live By the Spirit Of faith
- Religious affiliations: Roman Catholic (Christian Brothers)
- Established: 1980; 46 years ago
- Founder: Brother Daniel Aubin With Archbishop McCarthy
- Authority: Diocese of Palm Beach, Formerly Archdiocese of Miami
- Superintendent: Gary Gelo
- CEEB code: 100-123
- President: Edward Bernot
- Principal: Carissa Karakaedos
- Chaplain: Msgn Thomas Skindeleski
- Grades: 9–12
- Campus: 30 acres (120,000 m^{2})
- Color: Black - Gold - Blue
- Slogan: Live By The Spirit of Faith
- Athletics conference: Florida High School Athletic Association
- Sports: List: Basketball; Baseball; Bowling; Lacrosse; Cross Country; Golf; Cheerleading; Football; Volleyball; Soccer; Swimming & Diving; Tennis; Track & Field
- Mascot: Eagle
- Team name: Eagles
- Accreditation: Southern Association of Colleges & Schools/AdvancEd
- Tuition: Standard Tuition Rate (Non-Parishioner) - Grades 9,10,11*: $19,725 Standard Tuition Rate (Non-Parishioner) - Grade 12*: $20,000 Catholic (Parish Affiliation) Rate - Grades 9,10,11*: $18,975 Catholic (Parish Affiliation) Rate - Grade 12*: $19,250
- Affiliation: NASSP NCEA CB FCC DENA-BCS
- Website: www.sjpii.net

Saint John Paul II Academy (formerly Pope John Paul II High School) is a private, Catholic, coeducational, college-preparatory secondary education institution run by the Eastern North America District of the Institute of the Brothers of the Christian Schools in a 30-acre (120,000 m^{2}) campus in East Boca Raton, Florida, adjacent to the main campus of Lynn University. The school opened in 1980. Saint John Paul II Academy follows the tradition of Saint John Baptist De La Salle and the Brothers of the Christian Schools.

== Athletics and clubs ==
Fall, Winter and Spring Varsity and Junior Varsity sports include: football, cheerleading, boys and girls basketball, swimming, golf, cross country, track, girls volleyball, boys and girls soccer, baseball, tennis, and lacrosse. Clubs include Drama/Thespian, Robotics, Lasallian Youth, Art, Spirit, Science, DECA, Best Buddies, Chess, Model UN, Music Ensemble, Respect Life and SADD.
