= Heroes for My Son =

- Author: Brad Meltzer
- Language: English
- Publisher: HarperStudio
- Publication date: 2010
- Publication place: United States
- Media type: Print (Hardback)
- Pages: 128 pp
- ISBN: 9780061905285
- OCLC: 456180617

Heroes for my Son is a 2010 non-fiction book written by Brad Meltzer. It contains a series of vignettes on inspiring heroes — famous and lesser known — whose stories Brad wanted to share with his son. According to WorldCat, the book is in 737 libraries.

Meltzer's Heroes for My Daughter was published later in 2012.

== Contents ==
The book contains vignettes, quotations, and black and white photos of Meltzer's heroes, with details on their "character-building values":

- The Wright Brothers
- Team Hoyt
- Joe Shuster and Jerry Siegel
- Mr. Rogers
- Miep Gies
- Roberto Clemente
- Amelia Earhart
- Nelson Mandela
- Norman Borlaug
- Martin Luther King Jr.
- Anne Sullivan
- John Lennon
- Harriet Tubman
- Harry Houdini
- Jackie Robinson
- Albert Einstein
- Jesse Owens
- Jim Henson
- Jonas Salk
- Dr. Seuss
- Bella Abzug
- Dan West
- Mother Teresa
- Steven Spielberg
- George H. W. Bush
- Lucille Ball
- George Washington
- Charlie Chaplin
- Oprah Winfrey
- Frank Shankwitz
- Mark Twain
- Eleanor Roosevelt
- Neil Armstrong
- Paul Newman
- Pelé
- Barbara Johns
- Aung San Suu Kyi
- Eli Segal
- Abraham Lincoln
- Andy Miyares (Special Olympics swimmer)
- Clara Hale
- Muhammad Ali
- Barack Obama
- Harper Lee
- Thomas Jefferson
- Mahatma Gandhi
- Frederick Douglass
- Chesley B. Sullenberger
- Rosa Parks
- Lou Gehrig
- Teri Meltzer (the author's mother)
- Ben Rubin (the author's maternal grandfather)

== Inspiration ==
Brad Meltzer began collecting a list of heroes whose virtues and skills he wanted to share with his son when he grew up. The list grew to fifty-two people.

== Press ==
The book reached number two on the New York Times Bestseller List.
