= Donald E. Ross (academic administrator) =

Donald E. Ross is the President Emeritus at Lynn University. He is also the founder and former president of Wilmington University.

== Education ==
He earned undergraduate and graduate degrees from the New York Institute of Technology.

== Career ==
Donald E. Ross founded Wilmington University and served as that institution's president until 1977.

Donald E. Ross visited the campus of the struggling Marymount College in Boca Raton, Florida, to purchase its library. Ross was so inspired by the school that he decided to stay and help it succeed. In 1971, Donald E. Ross was named president of Marymount, and in 1974 the college was renamed as the College of Boca Raton. In the late 1980s, the school transitioned from a two-year to a four-year school, and in 1991 it was renamed Lynn University. He retired as Lynn's president in 2006, assuming the title of President Emeritus.

In 1984, Ross ran unsuccessfully for Congress losing to Dan Mica.

In 2003–2004, he was paid a salary of over $5,000,000, making him at the time the highest-paid college or university president in the nation.

== Recognition ==
He was inducted into the Sunshine State Conference Hall of Fame in 2009 for creating varsity athletics program at Lynn and being the guiding force behind Lynn's becoming member of SSC in 1997.

== Personal life ==
He has a son named Kevin M. Ross who succeeded him in office as Lynn's president in 2006.
