= Ruth Dennis Grover =

- Born: 1912; Portland, Oregon
- Died: 2003 (aged 90–91); Roads End, Oregon
- Known for: Painting
- Partner: Martha Kay Renfroe

Ruth Dennis Grover (1912–2003) was a painter and educator from Oregon known for her landscapes and her abstract art.

== Biography ==
Ruth Grover, a fifth-generation Oregonian, was born in 1912 in Portland, Oregon. She was raised by her father in Detroit, Michigan, spending the summers with her mother in Oregon. She studied art at the University of Michigan. After graduating with honors, Grover found work as a freelance commercial artist while working as a bookkeeper for her father's pneumatic tube manufacturing company in Detroit. In 1940, she moved to Wecoma, Oregon, and to Roads End, Oregon in 1944. Grover remained at Roads End for the rest of her life.

Grover lived with her partner, the writer M. K. Wren (Martha Kay Renfroe), from the 1960s until her death in 2003.

== Career ==
At the beginning of her career in Oregon, Grover focused on watercolor landscapes of the Oregon Coast and landscapes of Eastern Oregon. In 1956, she discovered the technique of encaustic painting. Her encaustic works are abstract, but remain rooted in nature's patterns.

Grover was active in the Oregon artistic community. She helped establish the Lincoln County Art Center, where she taught classes, as well as the Cascade Artists where she served as director for a time.

Grover has artworks in the collections of the Oregon Historical Society, Coos Art Museum, Erb Memorial Union (University of Oregon), and the Hallie Ford Museum of Art of Willamette University.
