= The Book of Fate =

2006 novel written by Brad Meltzer

- First hardcover edition
- Author: Brad Meltzer
- Language: English
- Genre: Novel
- Publisher: Warner Books
- Publication date: September 5, 2006
- Publication place: United States
- Media type: Print (hardback and paperback)
- Pages: 528 pp.
- ISBN: 0446530999
- OCLC: 64592069

The Book of Fate is a 2006 novel written by Brad Meltzer, published by Warner Books. In it, a 200-year-old code invented by Thomas Jefferson reveals a modern-day conspiracy that involves the power brokers of Washington, D.C and the elite of Palm Beach society.

An audiobook, read by Scott Brick, was released the same year.

== Plot synopsis ==
On a July 4 weekend, US President Wes Holloway attends an event. As the president is leaving, a crazed assassin attacks. The assassin kills one of the president's aides and best friends, Ron Boyle, and permanently disfigures Holloway with a bullet to the face. Eight years later, Boyle turns up alive. In trying to figure out how and why Boyle has returned, Wes must piece together clues involving that July 4, a decades-old presidential crossword puzzle, ancient Masonic symbols hidden in the street plan of Washington, D.C., and ultimately a 200-year-old code invented by Thomas Jefferson.
