= The Zero Game =

2004 novel by Brad Meltzer

- First edition
- Author: Brad Meltzer
- Language: English
- Genre: Novel
- Publisher: Warner Books
- Publication date: January 20, 2004
- Publication place: United States
- Media type: Print (hardback & paperback)
- Pages: 496 pp
- ISBN: 0446530980
- OCLC: 52575732

The Zero Game is a 2004 novel written by Brad Meltzer which follows two senior Congressional staffers who become involved in the clandestine Zero Game. They discover the game has a more sinister underpinning when someone close to them is murdered. According to WorldCat, the book is in 2173 libraries.

== Plot synopsis ==
The pieces of Meltzer's Zero Game include two jaded Capitol Hill staffers, a clandestine game, an explosive secret, and one idealistic Senate page.

The Capitol Hill staffers are named Matthew Mercer and Harris Sandler. They play the Zero Game, a game only a select few on Capitol Hill even know about, including their bosses, two of the most powerful Senators and Congressmen on Capitol Hill. Just being "in the know" enough to play proves to the two staffers that they are true power brokers in D.C. They soon discover, though, that the Zero Game is more than it appears. One of the two ends up dead. The other must recruit on a young Senate page named Viv to help keep him alive and finish the Zero Game to its shocking conclusion.
