= Dead Even =

1998 novel by Brad Meltzer

- First edition (US)
- Author: Brad Meltzer
- Language: English
- Genre: Novel
- Publisher: William Morrow (US); Hodder & Stoughton (UK)
- Publication date: 1998
- Publication place: United States
- Media type: Print (hardback & paperback)
- Pages: 560 pp
- ISBN: 068815090X
- OCLC: 38574512

Dead Even is the second novel written by Brad Meltzer about a husband and wife on opposite sides of a legal case. The book was published in 1998.

== Plot synopsis ==
Manhattan assistant district attorney Sara Tate is about to lose her job when she lands a case that could save it. She soon realizes that the district attorney is conspiring against her, and an outside force is arranging for her husband, Jared Lynch, to represent the other side of the case. Jared has been told he must win the case or Sara will die; Sara has been told to win the case or Jared will die. As a result, tensions rise both at home and in the courtroom. No matter who wins, one of them will die. The two work together to save themselves, their jobs, and ultimately their lives.

== Critical reception ==
The book was reviewed by Publishers Weekly, Entertainment Weekly, and Kirkus Reviews.
