= The First Counsel =

2001 novel by Brad Meltzer

- Author: Brad Meltzer
- Language: English
- Genre: Novel
- Publisher: Grand Central Publishing
- Publication date: Mar 9, 2001
- Publication place: United States
- Media type: Print (hardback & paperback)
- Pages: 544 pp
- ISBN: 0446527289
- OCLC: 43657051

The First Counsel is a 2001 novel written by Brad Meltzer about a young White House attorney who becomes ensnared in a deadly conspiracy after he gets close to the president's daughter. It is because of the First Daughter that he is accused of a murder he did not commit. Only with her help is he able to clear his name.

According to WorldCat, the book is in 2153 libraries.

== Plot ==
Nora Hartson, the daughter of the President of the United States, is code-named Shadow by agents of the Secret Service. A young White House attorney, Michael Garrick, begins dating her. Michael thinks he can handle the world where Nora's closest wear earpieces and carry guns, where his every move is watched, and in which his girlfriend's father is the most powerful man alive. However, when one night he and Nora unintendedly witness a scene they shouldn't have, are stopped by police with a suspicious amount of cash in Michael's car, and he later ends up accused of murdering Caroline Penzler, a fellow White House worker, he has to embark on a quest to prove his innocence.

Amidst a fierce reelection campaign by President Hartson, and amidst the FBI investigation launched after Penzler's murder, Michael is supported by his friends and coworkers Trey Powell and Pam Cooper, and somewhat too by Nora herself. This cooperation makes Michael and Nora's relationship closer, thanks to which Michael also gets to know some of the rumors in the press about Nora's use of drugs are true, and decides to help her to stop using drugs. As days pass, Nora brings Michael's situation into the knowledge of Lawrence Lamb, a senior advisor of President Hartson, and a longtime friend of his, who decides to start helping Michael, out of gratitude for him having helped Nora.

After receiving a note where a "P. Vaughn" urges him to rendezvous and talk, Lamb brings to Michael's attention that a drug dealer with a criminal record by the name "Patrick Vaughn" had been at the Eisenhower Executive Office Building, next to the White House, where Michael and Penzler both worked, at the same time of the events leading to Caroline's death. Vaughn's entrance is allegedly authorized by Michael. Upon meeting with Vaughn, Michael discovers Vaughn was made to go to the EEOB in mysterious circumstances that made him a suspect of carrying out the murder, but without him having committed it either. When Vaughn later invites Michael to have a second meeting at a hotel, alleging to have important information, Michael goes, but finds Vaughn dead with a shot to his forehead.

After this, the FBI releases information about the case to the press, which prompts Michael to flee, starting a district-wide manhunt that also expands to nearby states of Virginia and Maryland. Michael disappears and then, with Nora's help, reappears undetected at the EEOB the next day. When he finds many of the folders that had been in Penzler's office, Nora finds him, and he learns that Lamb was the mastermind after all of the events, and also that he had made Nora addicted to drug use since her childhood, using this to blackmail and sexually abuse her. Lamb discovers them, and, with a gun, tries to force Nora into burning the papers incriminating him, but after she hesitates and attacks him instead, Lamb shoots Michael, wounding him, and later tries to shoot him again to kill him, at which Nora gets in the way, saving Michael, but being killed instead. As a glass panel over which Lamb was, collapses, Lamb falls to his death.

After Nora's and Lamb's deaths, Michael's innocence is proven, but he decides to leave the White House.
