= The Fifth Assassin =

Part of a three-part book series by Brad Meltzer

- Author: Brad Meltzer
- Language: English
- Genre: Novel
- Publisher: Grand Central Publishing
- Publication date: January 15, 2013
- Publication place: United States
- Media type: Print (hardback & paperback)
- Pages: 448 pp
- ISBN: 9780446553971
- OCLC: 820835886

The Fifth Assassin is a 2013 novel written by Brad Meltzer that follows the adventures of archivist Beecher White as he discovers a connection linking the four successful presidential assassins with a modern-day killer who is recreating their crimes. It is part two of the three-part book series, The Culper Ring series; that also includes The Inner Circle (book one, published 2011) and The President's Shadow (book 3, published 2015).

== Plot synopsis ==
More than two-dozen would-be assassins have targeted Presidents of the United States. Only four were successful: John Wilkes Booth, Charles J. Guiteau, Leon Czolgosz, and Lee Harvey Oswald. Archivist Beecher White—protagonist of the #1 New York Times bestseller The Inner Circle—uncovers a new assassin in Washington, D.C., mimicking the crimes of the other four assassins. History has always believed the four killers were lone wolves, but Beecher thinks there may be more than meets the eye. Beecher discovers that all four assassins were working together over the course of a hundred years. But questions still remain to be answered: Why were they working together? Who do they work for? And what are their plans for the current President? Beecher and the team from The Inner Circle return to uncover the answers and face down the fifth assassin.

== Reception ==
According to WorldCat, the book is in 1887 libraries.
