= Sword of the Lamb =

Science fiction novel by American author M. K. Wren

Sword of the Lamb is a science fiction novel by American author M. K. Wren published by Berkley Books in 1981.

== Plot summary ==
Alexand, first born of the House of Dekoven Woolf seeks liberty for his people.

== Reception ==
Greg Costikyan reviewed Sword of the Lamb in Ares Magazine #9 and commented that "Sword of the Lamb is neither great literature nor good SF, but it is a 'page-turner.'" James Nicoll stated: "The writing is competent enough, pacing and wandering infodumps aside."

== Reviews ==
- Review by Baird Searles (1981) in Isaac Asimov's Science Fiction Magazine, July 6, 1981
- Review by Bob Mecoy (1981) in Future Life, November 1981
- Review by Debbie Notkin (1982) in Rigel Science Fiction, #3 Winter 1982
- Review by Keith Soltys (1982) in Science Fiction Review, Summer 1982
- Review by Denise Gorse (1986) in Paperback Inferno, #62
