= House of the Wolf (novel) =

House of the Wolf is a 1981 novel written by M. K. Wren.

== Plot summary ==
House of the Wolf is a novel in which the virtuous protagonist stars in the final volume in the Phoenix Legacy trilogy.

== Reception ==
Debbie Notkin for Rigel Science Fiction #3 (Winter 1982) commented on House of the Wolf as part of the series, saying the "Most of the flaws in the Phoenix Legacy are ones you won't recognize while you're reading and enjoying the books - afterward they become more visible."

Keith Soltys reviewed House of the Wolf for Science Fiction Review as part of The Phoenix Legacy, and remarked that it is "a very good novel and might have been a great one with a little more care."

Wendy Graham reviewed House of the Wolf for Adventurer magazine and stated that "Like most trilogies these days, it is an okay story flogged to death, with rather drippy characters leaping about loving or dying, rebelling or being dastardly and double-crossing. And the hero is too good to be true. When I got this book, I had to check in my library to discover that I had indeed read the first two, and as for this one -1 read it a couple of days before writing this and had to flip through the book to remind myself what it was about. Get the idea?"
