= Dead Wake =

2015 book by Erik Larson

- Cover of Dead Wake
- Author: Erik Larson
- Language: English
- Genre: History; nonfiction
- Publisher: Crown Publishers
- Publication date: 2015
- Publication place: United States
- Media type: Print, hardcover and paperback
- Pages: 448
- ISBN: 0-307-40886-8

Dead Wake: The Last Crossing of the Lusitania is a 2015 New York Times non-fiction bestseller written by author Erik Larson. The book looks at the sinking of Lusitania during World War I and the events surrounding the sinking.

== Awards ==
The book was named Book of the Year in the History Category by World Magazine. It won the Goodreads Choice Award for History & Biography in 2015.

== Reception ==
According to Amazon, Dead Wake was one of the 10 bestselling books of 2015.
