= The Inner Circle (Meltzer novel) =

2011 novel by Brad Meltzer

- First edition
- Author: Brad Meltzer
- Language: English
- Genre: Novel
- Publisher: Grand Central Publishing
- Publication date: January 11, 2011
- Publication place: United States
- Media type: Print (hardback & paperback)
- Pages: 464 pp
- ISBN: 0-446-57788-X
- OCLC: 214935200

The Inner Circle is a 2011 novel written by Brad Meltzer about Beecher White, a young man working in the National Archives. While working in the archives, Beecher and his childhood crush discover a 200-year-old dictionary belonging to George Washington. For reasons unknown, the sitting president keeps the dictionary hidden. Beecher wants to discover why, and the answer leads to murder, conspiracy, and the best-kept secret that all U.S. presidents have shared.

According to WorldCat, the book is in 2340 libraries.

== Plot synopsis ==
Beecher White works in the National Archives. That means he spends his working days protecting the most important documents of the U.S. government and history. This means he keeps other people's stories, but has never been part of the story. Until now.

One day, Beecher's old childhood crush shows up to ask Beecher for his help hunting down her long lost father. Hoping to impress Clementine, he takes her to a secret vault which the President uses to review highly classified documents. While in the vault, they accidentally stumble on a priceless artifact: a 200-year-old dictionary hidden in a secret desk compartment that once belonged to George Washington. The diary is the spark that ignites an adventure involving Clementine, Beecher and the highest reaches of the national government. A dead body and a trail of mystery obstruct Beecher's discovery of the truth behind this national treasure. Within the diary is a coded puzzle that hides a dark secret that tracks all the way back to the beginning of the United States. It is a secret that some will kill to keep secret.
