= The Book of Lies (Meltzer novel) =

2008 novel by Brad Meltzer

- First hardcover edition
- Author: Brad Meltzer
- Illustrator: Mark Lewis
- Language: English
- Genre: Novel
- Publisher: Grand Central Publishing
- Publication date: September 2, 2008
- Publication place: United States
- Media type: Print (hardback and paperback)
- Pages: 352 pp.
- ISBN: 0-446-57788-X
- OCLC: 214935200

The Book of Lies is a 2008 novel written by Brad Meltzer that assumes a connection between the story of Cain and Abel and the superhero Superman, co-created by Jerry Siegel. According to WorldCat, the book is in 2,133 libraries. The book has been translated into Polish, Hebrew, Italian, German, and Korean.

== Plot synopsis ==
The book of Genesis tells the story of the slaying of Abel by his brother Cain; the world's first recorded murder. Despite wide assumption that Cain used a rock or tree branch, the Bible does not state what weapon was used. That detail is lost to history.

In 1932, Mitchell Siegel was killed by three gunshots to the chest. As a result, his son dreamed of a bulletproof man and co-created one of the world's greatest superheroes: Superman. Like Cain's murder weapon, the gun used in this unsolved murder has never been found, until now.

In Fort Lauderdale, Florida, Cal Harper comes face-to-face with his family's greatest secret: his long-lost father, who has been shot with a gun that traces back to Mitchell Siegel's 1932 murder. When Cal and his father are attacked by a ruthless killer tattooed with the ancient markings of Cain, he learns that the two murders, committed thousands of years apart, have something in common, setting off the hunt for the world's first murder weapon. The novel goes on to follow Cal Harper and others in their search for answers.
