= Lynn University =

Private university in Boca Raton, Florida, U.S.

- Former names: Marymount College (1962–1974); College of Boca Raton (1974–1991)
- Type: Private university
- Established: 1962; 64 years ago
- Endowment: $45.6 million
- President: Kevin M. Ross
- Students: 3,520
- Location: Boca Raton, Florida, U.S. 26.384°N 80.125°W
- Campus: Suburban, 115 acres (47 ha)
- Colors: Blue & white
- Nickname: Fighting Knights
- Sporting affiliations: NCAA Division II – Sunshine State
- Mascot: Lance the Fighting Knight
- Website: lynn.edu
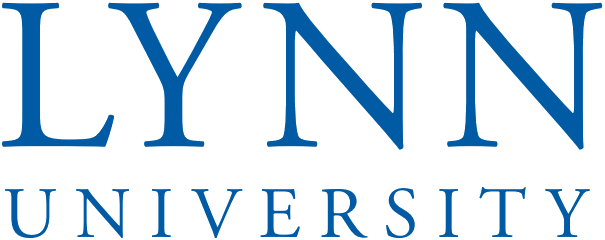

Lynn University is a private university in Boca Raton, Florida, United States. Founded in 1962, the university awards associate, baccalaureate, master's, and doctoral degrees. Lynn enrolls approximately 3,500 students.

== History ==
The school opened as Marymount College, a women's junior college founded by the Religious of the Sacred Heart of Mary (RSHM). In 1963, the college welcomed its first class, consisting of 96 women. From 1963 through the early 1970s, Marymount College underwent significant changes, including adding the institution’s first male population and expanding the campus. The college faced financial hardship and announced its closure by May 1972.

With an interest in purchasing books from the college's library, Donald E. Ross, who at the time was working for Wilmington College, visited the institution and was so inspired by the school he decided to stay and help it succeed. A period of transition began; the school was placed under the control of a lay board and Ross was named president.

In 1974, the institution's name was changed to the College of Boca Raton. The college was granted Level II accreditation in 1986. In 1988, it received Level III accreditation. During this time, it was transformed from a two-year school to a four-year college with a master's program. In September 1991, College of Boca Raton's board of trustees voted to change the school's name to Lynn University in honor of its benefactors, Boca Raton insurance magnate Eugene Lynn and his wife Christine.

In 2006, Ross retired after 35 years as the university's president. Kevin M. Ross succeeded his father in office.

On January 12, 2010, two days into Lynn University's humanitarian trip, called "Journey of Hope," a 7.0 magnitude earthquake hit Port-au-Prince, Haiti, devastating the country and taking the lives of four students and two faculty members.

On October 22, 2012, Lynn hosted the third and final 2012 U.S. presidential debate between U.S. president Barack Obama and former Massachusetts governor Mitt Romney concerning U.S. foreign policy. Journalist Bob Schieffer of CBS News moderated the debate.

== Academics ==
=== Academic programs ===
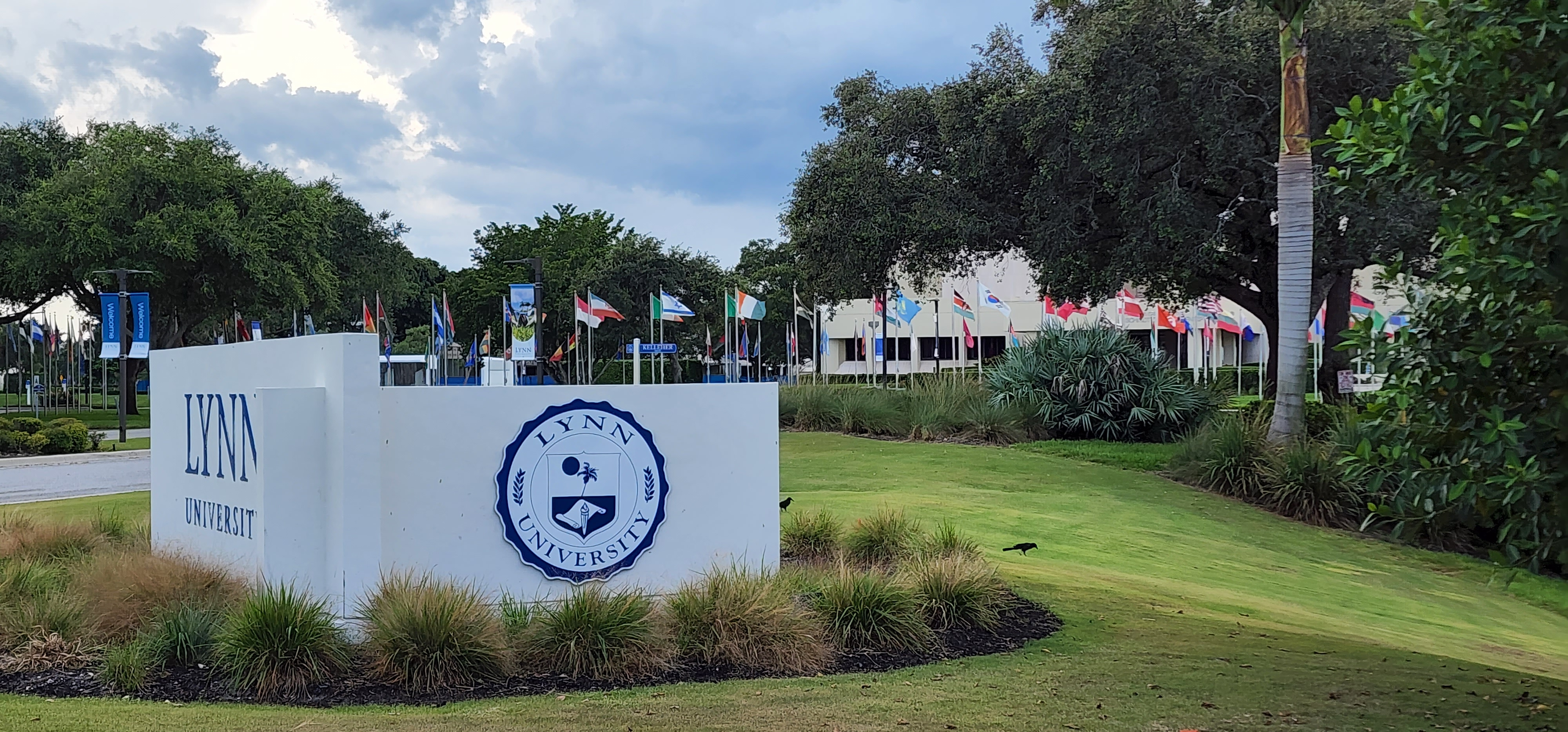
Entrance of Lynn University in Boca Raton

Lynn offers undergraduate and graduate curricula through its six colleges.

=== January term ===
All undergraduate students must also complete the three-course requirements of the January Term (J-term). J-term is a three-week immersive program focusing on citizenship, career preparation, and language and culture.

=== iPad initiative ===
In 2013, Lynn launched the iPad initiative. Under this plan, faculty-produced e-books replaced traditional textbooks and Lynn's core curricula became available on e-readers enhanced with custom multimedia content. In 2016, Lynn provided all undergraduate students and faculty with an iPad Pro, Apple Pencil, and Smart Keyboard.

== Athletics ==
Lynn University's athletic teams are known as the Fighting Knights. The university is an NCAA Division II institution. The college's athletic teams participate in the Sunshine State Conference (SSC). Lynn University teams have won a total of 25 NCAA and NAIA national championships, and 47 Sunshine State Conference championships. Men's varsity sports are baseball, basketball, golf, lacrosse, soccer, tennis, swimming, cross country and track & field. Women's varsity sports include basketball, golf, and lacrosse.

== Notable alumni ==
- Joseph Abruzzo – politician
- Jean Alexandre – professional soccer player
- Tal Erel – baseball player
- Kendra Erika – musician
- Maha Haddioui – professional golfer and Olympian
- Lisa Kerney – sports broadcaster
- John McCormack – College baseball coach
- Melissa Ortiz – soccer player
- Sherrexcia Rolle – attorney
- Ronald L. Rowe Jr. – civil servant
- Rachel Wolfson – comedian and stunt performer
