= M. K. Wren =

American novelist

- Born: Martha Kay Renfroe; June 5, 1938; Texas
- Died: August 20, 2016 (aged 78); Lincoln City, Oregon
- Occupation: Writer
- Partner: Ruth Dennis Grover
- Writing career
- Pen name: M.K. Wren
- Language: English
- Genres: Mystery, Science fiction
- Notable work: The Phoenix Legacy

Martha Kay Renfroe (June 5, 1938 – August 20, 2016) was an American writer of mystery and science fiction. Renfroe, who published her works under the pseudonym M.K. Wren, was best known for her mystery series featuring the character Conan Flagg.

== Early life ==
Renfroe was born in Texas.

== Career ==
Using the nom de plume M. K. Wren, her works included the Conan Flagg Mystery series, the Phoenix Legacy, a space opera trilogy, and A Gift Upon the Shore (1990), a post-apocalyptic novel. Publishers Weekly in its review of A Gift Upon the Shore described Wren's descriptions of "the subsistence-level daily life – the triumphs, the losses and the desperation" – as "compelling depictions." A Los Angeles Times review called Wren’s writing of the same book as "clear and concise for the most part, though bordering on the mystic when it comes to her descriptions of the woods, and especially the ocean in its many moods." The New York Times included it in its overview of recently released crime/suspense novels in its "Criminal At Large" column, describing Wren's A Multitude of Sins as "an artificial and pretentious formula mystery about an heiress who is a pianistic genius."

The Conan Flagg mysteries were translated into German and released by München Goldmann publisher in the late 1970s in Germany.

== Personal life ==
Renfroe was a longtime resident of Lincoln City, Oregon. She was also an artist whose artwork showed in galleries and at juried and invitational shows.

== Bibliography ==
Title	Publisher	Date	ISBN
A Gift Upon the Shore	Ballantine Books	February 3, 1990	0-345-36341-8
Neely Jones: The Medusa Pool	Minotaur Books	October 13, 1999	0-312-24223-9
The Shadow of Light (unpublished)	—		

=== A Conan Flagg Mystery (1973–1994) ===
No.	Title	Publisher	Date	ISBN
1	Curiosity Didn't Kill the Cat	Doubleday	January 1973	0-385-06478-0
2	A Multitude of Sins	Doubleday	January 1975	0-385-06720-8
3	Oh, Bury Me Not	Doubleday	January 1976	0-385-12078-8
4	Nothing's Certain but Death	Doubleday	January 1978	0-385-13283-2
5	Seasons of Death	Doubleday	April 1981	0-385-17413-6
6	Wake Up, Darlin' Corey	Doubleday	January 1984	0-385-19292-4
7	Dead Matter	Fawcett	May 29, 1993	0-345-37821-0
8	King of the Mountain	Fawcett	November 30, 1994	0-345-39019-9

=== Phoenix Legacy (1981) ===
No.	Title	Publisher	Date	ISBN
1	Sword of the Lamb	Berkley	February 1981	0-425-04746-6
2	Shadow of the Swan	Berkley	July 1981	0-425-04747-4
3	House of the Wolf	Berkley	October 1981	0-425-05058-0
