= Brad Meltzer =

American writer (born 1970)

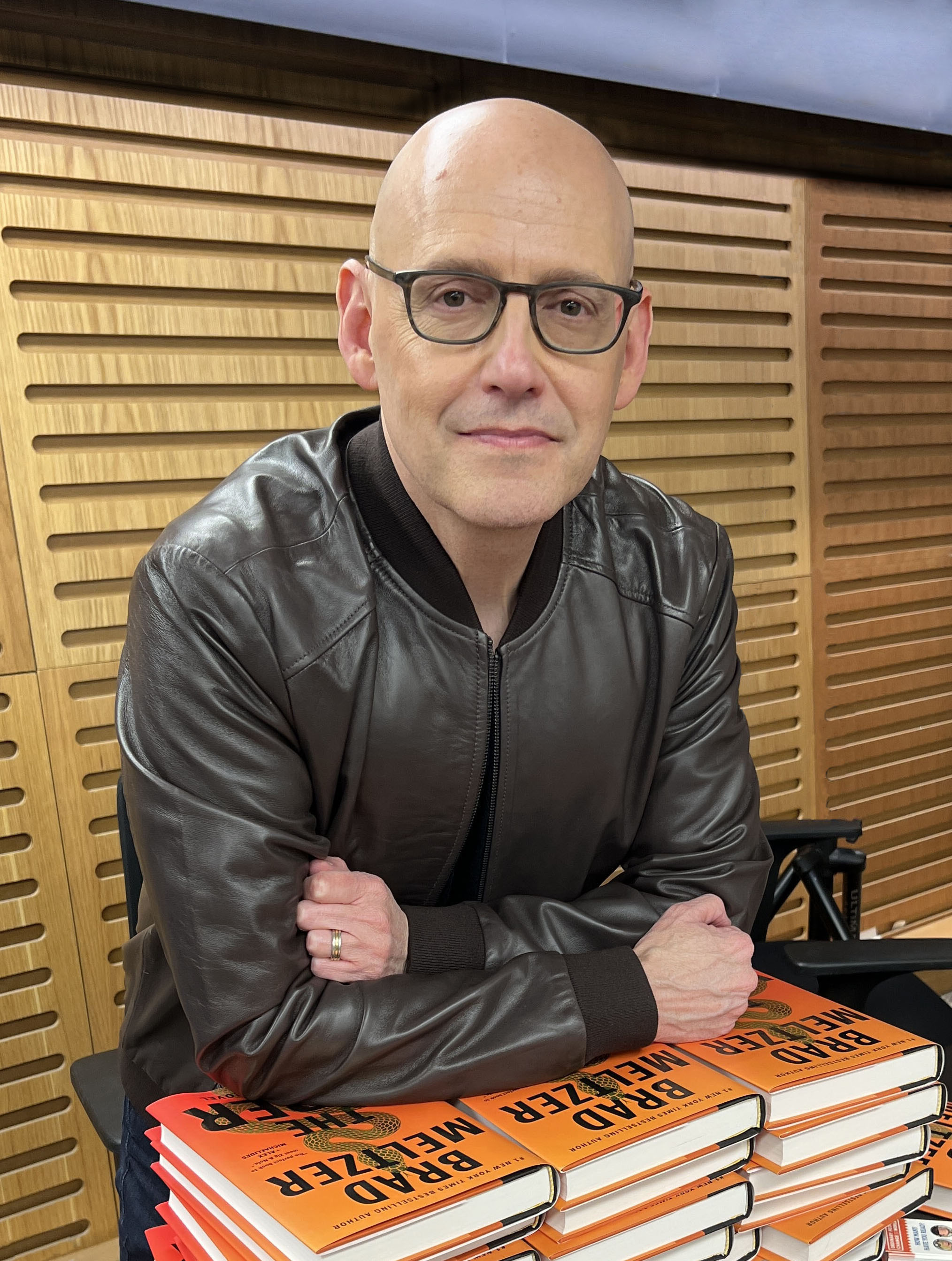
- Meltzer at a 2026 signing for The Viper at a Barnes & Noble in Manhattan
- Born: April 1, 1970 (age 56)
- Education: University of Michigan, Columbia Law School
- Occupations: Novelist; screenwriter; comic book writer
- Spouse: Cori Flam (m. 1995)
- Children: 3
- Writing career
- Period: 1997–present
- Genres: Political thriller, superhero fantasy, non-fiction
- Notable works: The Tenth Justice; Jack & Bobby; Identity Crisis
- Notable awards: 2008 Eisner Award for Best Single Issue (or One-Shot)
- Website: www.bradmeltzer.com

Brad Meltzer (born April 1, 1970) is an American novelist, non-fiction writer, TV show creator, and comic book author. His novels touch on the political thriller, legal thriller and conspiracy fiction genres, while he has also written superhero comics for DC Comics, and periodically Marvel Comics, and a series of short biographies of prominent people for young readers.

== Early life ==
Brad Meltzer was born on April 1, 1970, in Brooklyn, New York, to Jewish parents, Stewart and Teri Meltzer. He was raised in the Sheepshead Bay neighborhood. Meltzer has described his childhood home as having very few books, and his early interest in storytelling was shaped by the comic books his father brought home from work in the garment industry.

In 1983, following his father's job loss, the family relocated to Miami, Florida. The family arrived with limited financial resources and initially lived in his grandmother's one-bedroom apartment. Meltzer attended high school in Florida, where he was heavily influenced by his English teacher, Sheila Spicer, whom he credits with recognizing his writing talent and encouraging him to pursue honors-level coursework.

Meltzer was the first in his immediate family to attend a four-year college. He graduated from the University of Michigan in 1992 with a degree in history. He subsequently attended Columbia Law School, where he served on the Columbia Law Review and earned his Juris Doctor in 1996.

In 1993, Meltzer lived in Beacon Hill, Boston, Massachusetts with roommate, fellow comic book writer/artist Judd Winick, working in sales at Games magazine by day while working on his first novel by night. Afterwards, Meltzer received his Juris Doctor degree from Columbia Law School, and was selected to the Columbia Law Review. Meltzer has also been featured as a question on Jeopardy!.

== Career ==
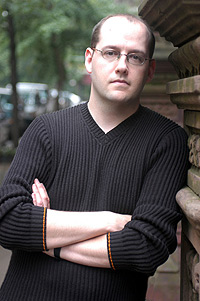
Meltzer in a 2003 publicity photo

Meltzer's books have appeared on the bestseller lists for fiction, non-fiction (History Decoded), advice (Heroes for My Son and Heroes for My Daughter), children's books (I Am Amelia Earhart and I Am Abraham Lincoln), and comic books (Justice League of America, for which he won an Eisner Award).

Meltzer is also responsible for helping find the missing 9/11 flag that the firefighters raised at Ground Zero at the World Trade Center site, making national news on the 15th anniversary of 9/11. Using his TV show, Brad Meltzer's Lost History, he told the story of the missing flag and asked Americans for their help in returning it. Four days later, a former Marine walked into a fire station in Everett, Washington, said that he saw Meltzer's TV show, and that he now wanted to return the flag. Meltzer unveiled the flag at the National September 11 Memorial & Museum in New York, where it is now on display.

Known for his thorough research, Meltzer counts former Presidents Bill Clinton and George H. W. Bush as fans, and both have helped him with his research. During Meltzer's research, Bush gave him the secret letter he left for Clinton in the Oval Office desk. In 2018, Meltzer was asked to read to Bush on his deathbed, having been among Bush's favorite authors.

In September 2006, Meltzer participated in a work group with the CIA, the FBI, various psychologists, and Department of Homeland Security intelligence staff to brainstorm new ways that terrorists might attack the U.S.

As an inspirational speaker, Meltzer's TEDx Talk, "How to Write Your Own Obituary", has been viewed over 100,000 times, and prompted TED to ask him to do another TED Talk: "Write Your Story, Change History", which had been viewed over 230,000 times as of February 2025.

== Novels ==
His first novel, Fraternity, garnered 24 rejection letters, but he then sold his second novel, The Tenth Justice, while in law school. In 1994, he co-wrote the original swearing-in oath that is taken by AmeriCorps members, and has been delivered by Presidents Bill Clinton and George W. Bush. In 1996, Meltzer created one of the earliest author websites for his first published novel, The Tenth Justice. Over the years, every one of Meltzer's thrillers has made The New York Times bestseller list and The Hollywood Reporter has listed him as one of "Hollywood's Most Powerful Authors".

Meltzer's popular "Culper Ring" novels, of which The President's Shadow is the third, imagine that a secret spy ring, founded in real life by George Washington, continues to exist today. His 2013 novel, The Fifth Assassin, follows a killer bent on re-creating the crimes of presidential assassinations from John Wilkes Booth to Lee Harvey Oswald. Meltzer's 2018 novel The Escape Artist debuted at No. 1 on The New York Times Hardcover Fiction Bestseller list.

== Non-fiction ==
In May 2010, Meltzer released his first nonfiction book, Heroes For My Son, a book he had worked on for almost a decade, beginning on the night his first son was born. The book is part of a two-book deal with Meltzer's publisher. He stated in a May 2010 interview that he was working on Heroes for My Daughter. The book is a collection of stories from the lives of 52 people such as Jim Henson, Rosa Parks, and Mr. Rogers, and was written with the intention of being presented one day to his then-eight-year-old son. It debuted at #2 on The New York Times bestseller list. Heroes for My Daughter also made The New York Times bestseller list.

In January 2014, Meltzer and artist Chris Eliopoulos launched a line of biographies for kids, starting with I Am Amelia Earhart and I Am Abraham Lincoln, which debuted on The New York Times bestseller list. The books are part of a series, Ordinary People Change the World, whose books tell the stories of America's icons in an entertaining way to engage young readers. He followed the initial books with I Am Albert Einstein, I Am Rosa Parks, I Am Lucille Ball, I Am Jackie Robinson, I Am Helen Keller, I Am Martin Luther King, Jr., I Am Jane Goodall, I Am George Washington and I Am Jim Henson. In October 2017, I Am Gandhi and I Am Sacagawea were released. In October 2018, PBS announced an animated adaptation of the series called Xavier Riddle and the Secret Museum, which debuted in November 2019.

In January 2019, Meltzer released The First Conspiracy: The Secret Plot to Kill George Washington, cowritten with Josh Mensch. In May 2020, Meltzer and co-author Josh Mensch released The Lincoln Conspiracy: The Secret Plot to Kill America's 16th President—and Why It Failed, which covers the foiled plot to kill Lincoln in 1861. He followed with The Nazi Conspiracy: The Secret Plot to Kill Roosevelt, Stalin, and Churchill in January 2023 and The JFK Conspiracy: The Secret Plot to Kill Kennedy—and Why It Failed in January 2025.

== Comics ==
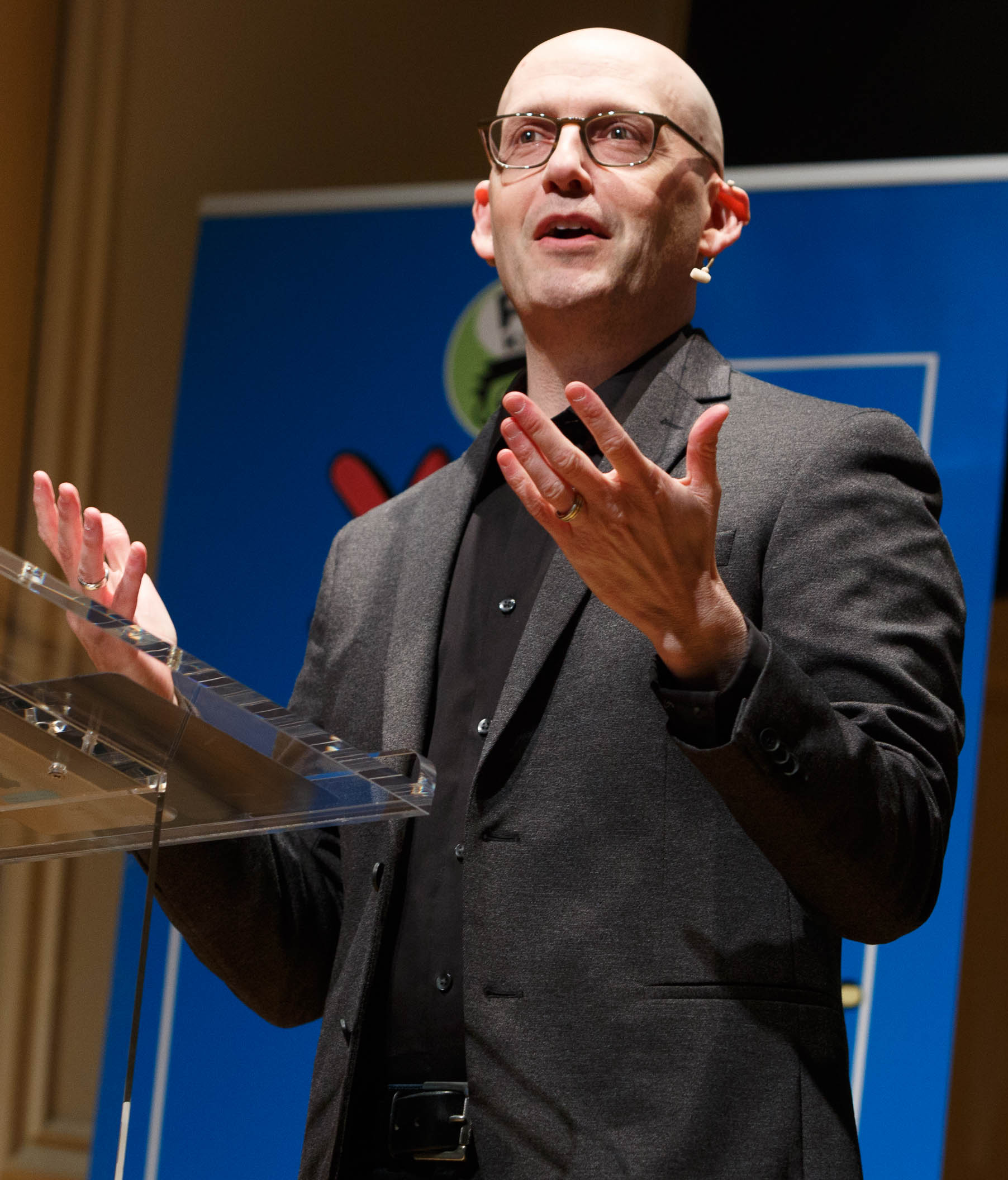
Meltzer at a 2019 Library of Congress "National Book Festival Presents" series event

Meltzer followed director Kevin Smith's run on DC Comics' Green Arrow and created a six-issue story arc for DC Comics' Green Arrow #16–21 (October 2002 – April 2003). Titled "Green Arrow: Archer's Quest", the series follows Green Arrow and Arsenal taking a trip down memory lane to collect items from their past.

In 2004 he wrote the miniseries Identity Crisis, which became one of the most controversial storylines of the decade, one of the top selling books of that decade, and also one of the most popular. It regularly makes the list of DC Comics' "best comics", "best moments", and even "best fights", praised by The New York Times and director Joss Whedon. While the miniseries holds an average score of 7.3 out of 10 at the review aggregator website Comic Book Roundup, (the lowest issue score going to issue #7, with 5.3, and the highest going to issue #1, with 8.7), it was criticized for its use of sexual violence as a plot device, for retconning events in DC continuity that critics and readers felt harmed the characterization of long-standing DC heroes, and for influencing similar subsequent comics.

Meltzer was one of many writers and artists who contributed to Superman/Batman #26 (June 2006), a tribute book dedicated to Sam Loeb, the son of writer Jeph Loeb, who died of cancer in 2005 at the age of 17. Meltzer scripted pages 11–12 and 19 of the comic book.

Meltzer took over the writing duties for a 13-issue stint on the new monthly Justice League of America series, which started with issue #0 on July 19, 2006, and issue #1 following a month later. Meltzer and artist Gene Ha received the 2008 Eisner Award for Best Single Issue (or One-Shot) for their work on issue #11 of the series. The award was presented by Samuel L. Jackson and Gabriel Macht.

In 2008, it was announced that Meltzer would write an arc of Joss Whedon's Buffy the Vampire Slayer Season Eight comic book for Dark Horse Comics. Whedon would later appear as himself, alongside Brian K. Vaughan and Damon Lindelof in the trailer for Meltzer's 2008 release of The Book of Lies. Whedon, Vaughan and Lindelof portray themselves as conspiracy theorists who believe in a so-called "Book of Lies" which, in Meltzer's novel, connects the original murder story (Cain and Abel) to the murder of Jerry Siegel's father, shortly before the conception of the iconic Superman character. In 2010, Meltzer wrote #32–35 of Buffy the Vampire Slayer Season Eight.

In January 2014 Meltzer and artist Bryan Hitch collaborated on a retelling of Batman's first appearance for Detective Comics (vol. 2) #27. Meltzer and artist John Cassaday crafted the "Faster Than a Speeding Bullet" chapter in Action Comics #1000 (June 2018).

On October 12, 2023, Meltzer and a group of colleagues announced at the New York Comic Con that they were forming a cooperative media company called Ghost Machine, which would publish creator-owned comics, and allow the participating creators to benefit from the development of their intellectual properties. The company publishes its books through Image Comics, and its other founding creators includes Geoff Johns, Jason Fabok, Gary Frank, Bryan Hitch, Francis Manapul, and Peter J. Tomasi, all of whom would produce comics work exclusively through that company. Meltzer's inaugural work for Ghost Machine would be writing First Ghost, a supernatural story written set in the White House.

== Television ==
Meltzer was the co-creator of the television series Jack & Bobby, which ran for one season (2004–2005) on the WB television network.

Meltzer hosted the History series Brad Meltzer's Decoded, which aired from December 2, 2010, to January 20, 2012.

On October 31, 2014, Brad Meltzer's Lost History premiered on History's H2 network, with Meltzer hosting. Each episode of Lost History presents both solved and unsolved cases and success stories where Americans have helped find missing historic objects such as the Ground Zero flag from 9/11 and the original Wright Brothers flying machine patent. Viewers are encouraged to submit tips to an online site, in an effort to provide key information leading to the return of these treasures. In September 2016, Meltzer hosted America's 9/11 Flag: Rose from the Ashes, which recounts how Lost History located and authenticated the missing 9/11 flag.

Meltzer appeared on Impractical Jokers that featured his promotional book appearance at the Mysterious Book Shop serving as the setting for Murr's punishment in "Let's Get Crackin'".

== Personal life ==
Meltzer lives in Florida with his wife, an attorney. He has two sons and a daughter.

=== Personal activities ===
Meltzer helped preserve the house where Superman was created in Cleveland, Ohio, helping to create the Siegel & Shuster Society, then telling the story of the house and running an auction that raised over $100,000.

Meltzer has worked with numerous organizations throughout Florida to promote literacy within the state. He has worked with Florida Family Literacy Initiative, and participated in the Literacy Coalition of Palm Beach County's 23rd Annual Love of Literacy Luncheon in March 2014.

Meltzer was one of four authors selected to entertain at Barbara Bush's 90th birthday party in 2015.

Meltzer helped save the life of his 11th-grade history teacher. When his teacher told Meltzer she was sick and needed a new kidney, Meltzer asked his 100,000 Facebook fans to find her a new kidney, and helped find a donor.

During Star Wars Night at the 2015 Marlins/Mets baseball game, Meltzer threw out the first pitch of the game, then proceeded to fight mascot Billy the Marlin in a lightsaber battle. Meltzer also threw out the first pitch at Yankee Stadium in February 2019.

In May 2024, Meltzer delivered the commencement address at the University of Michigan, in front of 70,000 people, including his graduating son.

== Published works ==
=== Novels ===
#	Title	Publication date	ISBN	Series
1	The Tenth Justice	1997	978-0-688-15089-1	
2	Dead Even	1998	978-0-688-15090-7	
3	The First Counsel	2001	978-0-446-52728-6	
4	The Millionaires	2002	978-0-446-52729-3	
5	The Zero Game	2004	978-0-446-53098-9	
6	The Book of Fate	2006	978-0-446-53099-6	
7	The Book of Lies	2008	978-0-446-57788-5	
8	The Inner Circle	2011	978-0-446-57371-9	Culper Ring, #1
9	The Fifth Assassin	2013	978-0-446-55397-1	Culper Ring, #2
10	The President's Shadow	2015	978-0-446-55393-3	Culper Ring, #3
11	The House of Secrets	2016	978-1-4555-5949-7	
12	The Escape Artist	2018	978-1-4555-7122-2	Zig and Nola, #1
13	The Lightning Rod	2022	978-0-06-289240-9	Zig and Nola, #2
14	The Viper	2025	978-0-06-289243-0	Zig and Nola, #3

=== Comics ===
==== DC Comics ====
- Green Arrow vol. 3 #16–21 (with Phil Hester, 2002–2003) collected as Green Arrow: The Archer's Quest (hc, 176 pages, 2003, ISBN 1-4012-0010-9; tpb, 2004, ISBN 1-4012-0044-3)
- Identity Crisis #1–7 (with Rags Morales, 2004–2005) collected as Identity Crisis (hc, 288 pages, 2005, ISBN 1-4012-0688-3; tpb, 2006, ISBN 1-4012-0458-9; Absolute Edition, 2011, ISBN 1-4012-3258-2)
- Superman/Batman #26 (with Ian Churchill and Carlos Pacheco, two short sequences among other writers and artists, 2006) collected in Superman/Batman Volume 2 (tpb, 336 pages, 2014, ISBN 1-4012-5079-3)
- Justice League of America vol. 2 (with Ed Benes, Shane Davis (#8), Gene Ha (#11) and Eric Wight (#12), 2006–2007) collected as:
  - The Tornado's Path (collects #1–7, hc, 224 pages, 2007, ISBN 1-4012-1349-9; tpb, 2008, ISBN 1-4012-1580-7)
  - The Lightning Saga (collects #0 and 8–12, hc, 224 pages, 2008, ISBN 1-4012-1652-8; tpb, 2009, ISBN 1-4012-1869-5)
  - Justice League of America by Brad Meltzer (collects #0–12, hc, 470 pages, 2020, ISBN 1-77950-245-1)
- DC Universe: Last Will and Testament (with Adam Kubert, one-shot, 2008) collected in Final Crisis Omnibus (hc, 1,512 pages, 2018, ISBN 1-4012-8503-1)
- Batman:
  - Detective Comics vol. 2 #27: "The Case of the Chemical Syndicate" (with Bryan Hitch, co-feature, 2014) collected in Batman: Detective Comics — Gothopia (hc, 208 pages, 2014, ISBN 1-4012-4998-1; tpb, 2015, ISBN 1-4012-5466-7)
  - DC 100-Page Comic Giant: Our Fighting Forces: "Medal of Honor" (co-written by Meltzer and Salvatore Giunta, art by Jim Lee, co-feature in one-shot, 2020)
- Action Comics #1000: "Faster Than a Speeding Bullet" (with John Cassaday, co-feature, 2018)

==== Other publishers ====
- Buffy the Vampire Slayer Season Eight #32–35: "Twilight" (with Georges Jeanty, Dark Horse, 2010) collected in Buffy the Vampire Slayer Season Eight Volume 4 (hc, 320 pages, 2013, ISBN 1-61655-127-5)
- Aw Yeah Comics! #2: "The Best Fight Ever!" (co-written by Meltzer and his son Theo, art by Franco Aureliani, co-feature, Aw Yeah, 2013) collected in Aw Yeah Comics! And... Action! (tpb, 152 pages, Dark Horse, 2014, ISBN 1-61655-558-0)
- Love is Love (untitled one-page story, with Chris Eliopoulos, anthology graphic novel, 144 pages, IDW Publishing, 2016, ISBN 1-63140-939-5)
- Marvel Comics #1000: "We're Calling Him Ben" (with Julian Totino Tedesco, anthology, Marvel, 2019) collected in Marvel Comics 1000 (hc, 144 pages, 2020, ISBN 1-302-92137-1)

=== Non-fiction ===
#	Title	Co-author	Publication date	ISBN
1	Heroes for My Son		2010	978-0-06-190528-5
2	Heroes for My Daughter		2012	978-0-06-190526-1
3	History Decoded: The 10 Greatest Conspiracies of All Time	Keith Ferrell	2013	978-0-7611-7745-6
4	The First Conspiracy: The Secret Plot to Kill George Washington	Josh Mensch	2019	978-1-250-13033-4
5	The Lincoln Conspiracy: The Secret Plot to Kill America's 16th President--and Why It Failed	Josh Mensch	2020	978-1-250-31747-6
6	The Nazi Conspiracy: The Secret Plot to Kill Roosevelt, Stalin, and Churchill	Josh Mensch	2023	978-1-250-77726-3
7	The JFK Conspiracy: The Secret Plot to Kill Kennedy―and Why It Failed	Josh Mensch	2025	978-1-250-79057-6
8	Make Magic: The Book of Inspiration You Didn't Know You Needed		2025	978-0-063-44071-5

=== Children's books ===
Illustrations done by Chris Eliopoulos

#	Title	Publication date	ISBN
1	I Am Abraham Lincoln	2014	978-0-8037-4083-9
2	I Am Amelia Earhart	2014	978-0-8037-4082-2
3	I Am Rosa Parks	2014	978-0-8037-4085-3
4	I Am Albert Einstein	2014	978-0-8037-4084-6
5	I Am Jackie Robinson	2015	978-0-8037-4086-0
6	I Am Lucille Ball	2015	978-0-525-42855-8
7	I Am Helen Keller	2015	978-0-525-42851-0
8	I Am Martin Luther King, Jr.	2016	978-0-525-42852-7
9	I Am George Washington	2016	978-0-525-42848-0
10	I Am Jane Goodall	2016	978-0-525-42849-7
11	I Am Jim Henson	2017	978-0-525-42850-3
12	I Am Gandhi	2017	978-0-7352-2870-2
13	I Am Sacagawea	2017	978-0-525-42853-4
14	I Am Harriet Tubman	2018	978-0-7352-2871-9
15	I Am Neil Armstrong	2018	978-0-7352-2872-6
16	I Am Sonia Sotomayor	2018	978-0-7352-2873-3
17	I Am Billie Jean King	2019	978-0-7352-2874-0
18	I Am Walt Disney	2019	978-0-7352-2875-7
19	I Am Marie Curie	2019	978-0-525-55585-8
20	I Am Leonardo da Vinci	2020	978-0-525-55588-9
21	I Am Benjamin Franklin	2020	978-0-525-55591-9
22	I Am Anne Frank	2020	978-0-525-55594-0
23	A New Day	2021	978-0-525-55424-0
24	I Am Frida Kahlo	2021	978-0-525-55598-8
25	I Am I.M. Pei	2021	978-0-525-55601-5
26	I Am Oprah Winfrey	2021	978-0-593-40582-6
27	I Am Malala Yousafzai	2022	978-0-593-40588-8
28	I Am Muhammad Ali	2022	978-0-593-40585-7
29	I Am Dolly Parton	2022	978-0-593-40592-5
30	I Am Superman	2022	978-0-593-53143-3
31	I Am Batman	2022	978-0-593-53146-4
32	I Am Temple Grandin	2023	978-0-593-40597-0
33	I Am John Lewis	2023	978-0-593-40594-9
34	I Am Wonder Woman	2023	978-0-593-53149-5
35	I Am Mister Rogers	2023	978-0-593-53330-7
36	I Am Ruth Bader Ginsburg	2024	978-0-593-53334-5
37	I Am Stephen Hawking	2024	978-0-593-53339-0
38	I Am Sally Ride	2025	978-0-593-53342-0
39	We Are the Beatles	2025	978-0-593-53345-1

== Awards ==
Work	Year & award	Category	Result	Ref.
The Book of Fate	2006 Florida Book Awards	Genre Fiction	Bronze	
Identity Crisis	2007 Great Graphic Novels for Teens		Top 10	
Justice League of America #11: Walls	2008 Eisner Awards	Single Issue/One-Shot	Won	
Heroes for My Son	2010 Florida Book Awards	Children's Literature	Bronze	
Buffy the Vampire Slayer	2011 GLAAD Media Award for Outstanding Comic Book		Nominated	
The Fifth Assassin	2013 Florida Book Awards	Popular Fiction	Silver	
The Fifth Assassin	2014 Audie Awards	Thriller or Suspense	Nominated	
History Decoded: The 10 Greatest Conspiracies of All Time (with Keith Ferrell)	2014 Killer Nashville Awards	Silver Falchion Award - Mainstream Crime Reference	Won	
The President's Shadow	2016 Audie Awards	Thriller or Suspense	Nominated	
I Am Jane Goodall (with Chris Eliopoulos)	2016 Nerdy Book Award (Nerdies)	Early Readers and Chapter Books	Won	
I Am Jane Goodall (with Chris Eliopoulos)	2018 Washington Library Association OTTER Award		Nominated	
The First Conspiracy: The Secret Plot to Kill George Washington (with Josh Mensch)	2019 Goodreads Choice Awards	History & Biography	Nominated	
The First Conspiracy: The Secret Plot to Kill George Washington (with Josh Mensch)	2020 Audie Awards	History or Biography	Nominated	
The Lincoln Conspiracy: The Secret Plot to Kill America's 16th President - and Why it Failed (with Josh Mensch)	2020 Goodreads Choice Awards	History & Biography	Nominated	
The Lincoln Conspiracy: The Secret Plot to Kill America's 16th President - and Why it Failed (with Josh Mensch)	2021 Audie Awards	History or Biography	Nominated	
I Am Oprah Winfrey (with Chris Eliopoulos)	2022 Eisner Awards	Publication for Early Readers	Nominated	
The Nazi Conspiracy: The Secret Plot to Kill Roosevelt, Stalin and Churchill (with Josh Mensch)	2023 Goodreads Choice Awards	History & Biography	Nominated	
	2009 International Thriller Writers Awards	Silver Bullet Award	Won	

Preceded by Kevin Smith	Green Arrow writer 2002–2003	Succeeded by Judd Winick
Preceded by Bob Harras (JLA)	Justice League of America writer 2006–2007	Succeeded by Dwayne McDuffie
