= Shadow of the Swan =

Novel

Shadow of the Swan is a novel by M. K. Wren published in 1981.

== Plot summary ==
Shadow of the Swan is a novel in which Alex Ransom commands the space fleet involved in a revolution.

== Reception ==
Greg Costikyan reviewed Shadow of the Swan in Ares Magazine #11 and commented that "The series is, if you will, Dallas goes science fiction. Which is not to say that Wren is less than a competent writer; her style is neutral but clear and her prose well executed. The subject, however, is somewhere between space opera and soap opera."

== Reviews ==
- Review by Jeff Frane (1981) in Locus, #244 May 1981
- Review by Baird Searles (1981) in Isaac Asimov's Science Fiction Magazine, December 21, 1981
