= The Millionaires =

2002 novel by Brad Meltzer

- Author: Brad Meltzer
- Language: English
- Genre: Novel
- Publisher: Grand Central Publishing
- Publication date: January 8, 2002
- Publication place: United States
- Media type: Print (hardback & paperback)
- Pages: 496 pp
- ISBN: 0446527297
- OCLC: 48689505

The Millionaires is a 2002 novel written by Brad Meltzer examining the inner workings of private banking. After taking $3,000,000 from an abandoned account, brothers Oliver and Charlie Caruso are forced to escape the Secret Service. According to WorldCat, the book is in 2191 libraries.

== Plot synopsis ==
What started as the perfect crime for a pair of employees at the private banking firm of Greene & Greene takes a turn for the worse. Charlie and Oliver Caruso work at Greene & Greene, a private bank that is so exclusive you need at least two million dollars just to be a client. The brothers are denied a promotion. As one opportunity closes, though, another reveals itself. A mysterious benefactor brings to their attention an abandoned bank account. No one knows of the account's existence, it doesn't belong to anyone, and it contains three million dollars. IT is the brothers' for the taking. The brothers see the abandoned account as their way into a new life, debt-free. As soon as they take the money though, things take a turn for the worse. A friend of theirs dies, and then the eyes of the Secret Service, their bank, and a female private investigator turn on them. The brothers must scramble to find out who is pulling the invisible strings of that account, how they will prove their innocence, and what they need to do escape the Secret Service. In the process, their trust and relationship is tested.
