= Wilmington University =

Private university in New Castle County, Delaware, U.S.

- Former name: Wilmington College (1968–2007)
- Type: Private university
- Established: 1968; 58 years ago
- Founder: Donald E. Ross
- Accreditation: MSCHE
- Academic affiliations: NAICU • space-grant
- Endowment: $155 million (2022)
- President: LaVerne Harmon
- Faculty: 80 (full-time); 1,341 (part-time)
- Students: 18,787 (fall 2024)
- Undergraduates: 12,265 (fall 2024)
- Postgraduates: 6,017 (fall 2024)
- Doctoral students: 654 (fall 2024)
- Location: New Castle (postal address), Delaware, United States
- Campus: Large suburb
- Colors: Green and white
- Nickname: Wildcats
- Sporting affiliations: NCAA Division II – CACC
- Mascot: Wiley D. Wildcat
- Website: www.wilmu.edu

Wilmington University (WilmU) is a private university with its main campus in unincorporated New Castle County, Delaware, United States. It was established in 1968 by educator Donald E. Ross as Wilmington College and was renamed Wilmington University in 2007.

== History ==
Founded in 1968, Wilmington University began with a small group of students under the leadership of Donald Ross. The institution experienced significant growth over the following decades, particularly under the presidency of Audrey K. Doberstein, expanding its enrollment to over 10,000 students by 2006. The name change to Wilmington University in 2007 was aimed at better reflecting its broad range of undergraduate and graduate programs.

== Campuses ==
The main campus is located in Wilmington Manor, a census-designated place in unincorporated New Castle County, Delaware. It includes key facilities such as the Pratt Student Center and the Wilson Graduate Center. Additionally, Wilmington University operates several other campuses in Delaware, including in Dover and Georgetown, as well as partner locations in New Jersey and Maryland.

== Academics ==
Wilmington University offers academic programs through its five colleges:

- The College of Professional and Continuing Education offers non-credit and workforce development training programs.
- The College of Education and Liberal Arts offers accredited teacher preparation programs and undergraduate programs in mathematics and liberal studies.
- The College of Business and Technology delivers undergraduate, graduate, and doctoral degrees in business and technology disciplines and with its business programs accredited by the International Assembly for Collegiate Business Education.
- The College of Health Professions and Natural Sciences focuses on completion programs for registered nurses and includes a Doctor of Nursing Practice program. Additional programming focuses on health sciences, environmental science, biology, and chemistry.
- The College of Social & Behavioral Sciences features programs in areas such as political science and clinical mental health counseling.
- The School of Law, as of March 2025, is provisionally accredited by the American Bar Association.

== Athletics ==
Wilmington University's athletic teams, known as the Wildcats, compete in Division II of the National Collegiate Athletic Association, and the Central Atlantic Collegiate Conference. The Wilmington University Athletic Complex in Bear, Delaware, serves as the primary facility for various sports, including basketball, soccer, and lacrosse.

== Notable alumni ==
- Anthony Allison, professional soccer player
- Hugh T. Broomall, major general, United States Air Force
- Richard C. Cathcart, former house majority leader, Delaware House of Representatives
- Dril, Twitter personality
- Bushra Gohar, member, National Assembly of Pakistan
- Thomas P. Gordon, county executive, New Castle County, Delaware
- Ruth Briggs King, member, Delaware House of Representatives
- Trinidad Navarro, insurance commissioner of Delaware
- Charles Potter Jr., member, Delaware House of Representatives
- David D. Rudolph, member, Maryland House of Delegates
- Peter C. Schwartzkopf, speaker, Delaware House of Representatives
- Terry R. Spence, former speaker, Delaware House of Representatives
- Francis D. Vavala, adjutant general, State of Delaware
- R. Thomas Wagner Jr., Delaware's auditor of accounts
- Veda Davida Wooley, deputy attorney general at Delaware Department of Justice

== Notable faculty ==
- Lem Burnham, former director and vice president for player & employee development at the National Football League (NFL), former Philadelphia Eagles defensive end, current vice president for the Philadelphia chapter of NFL Alumni
- Henry Milligan, actor, engineer, and professional boxer
