= Chris Eliopoulos =

American cartoonist

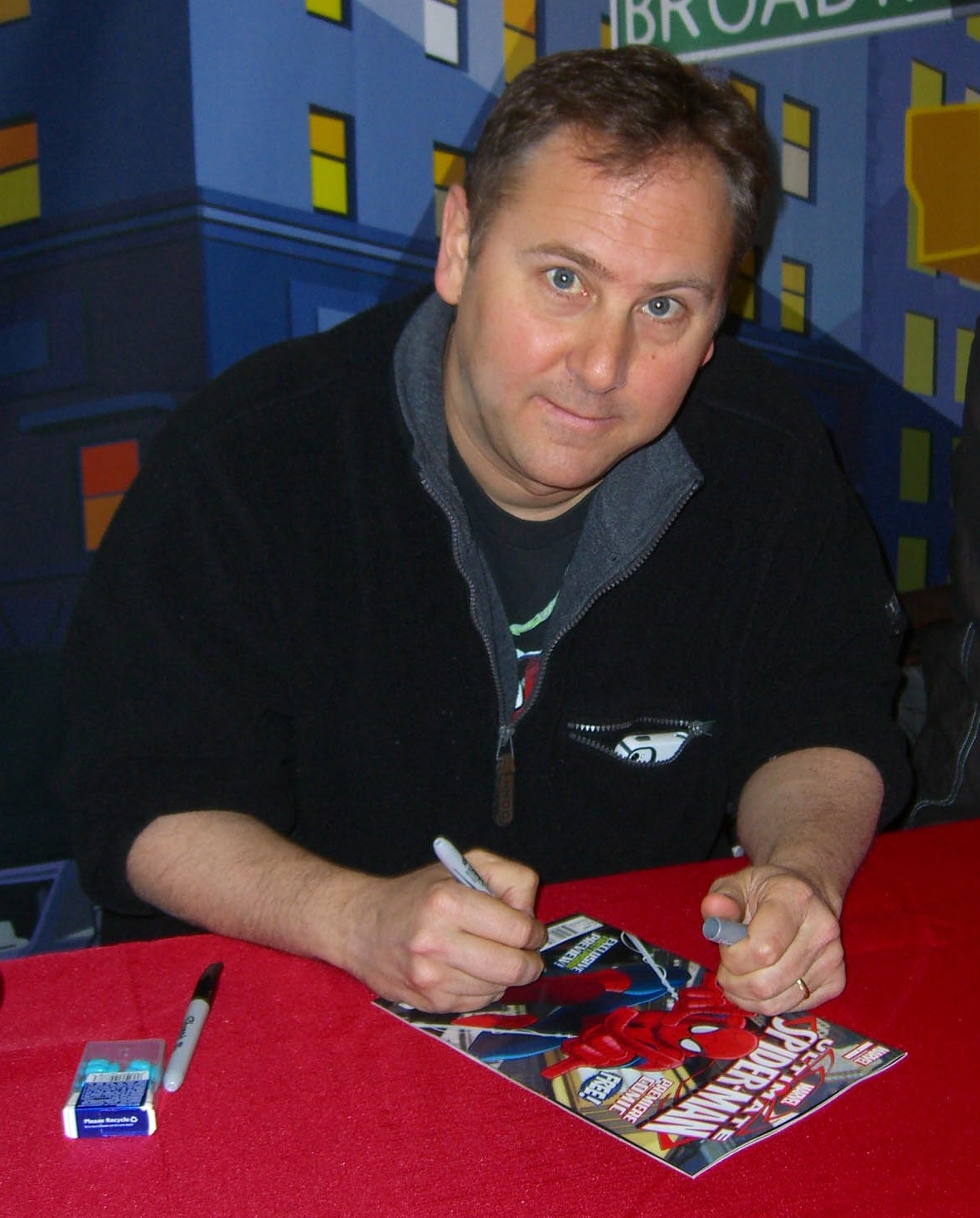
- Chris Eliopoulos at the March 31, 2012 launch party for Ultimate Spider-Man at Midtown Comics in Manhattan
- Born: September 30, 1967 (age 59) Astoria, Queens, New York, US
- Areas: Letterer, penciller, inker, writer
- Notable works: Desperate Times; Franklin Richards: Son of a Genius; Misery Loves Sherman
- Awards: Harvey Award 2008

Chris Eliopoulos (born September 30, 1967) is an American cartoonist and letterer of comic books.

== Early life ==
Eliopoulos attended the Fashion Institute of Technology in New York City from 1985 to 1989. He majored in graphic design and minored in illustration. He is a resident of River Vale, New Jersey.

== Career ==
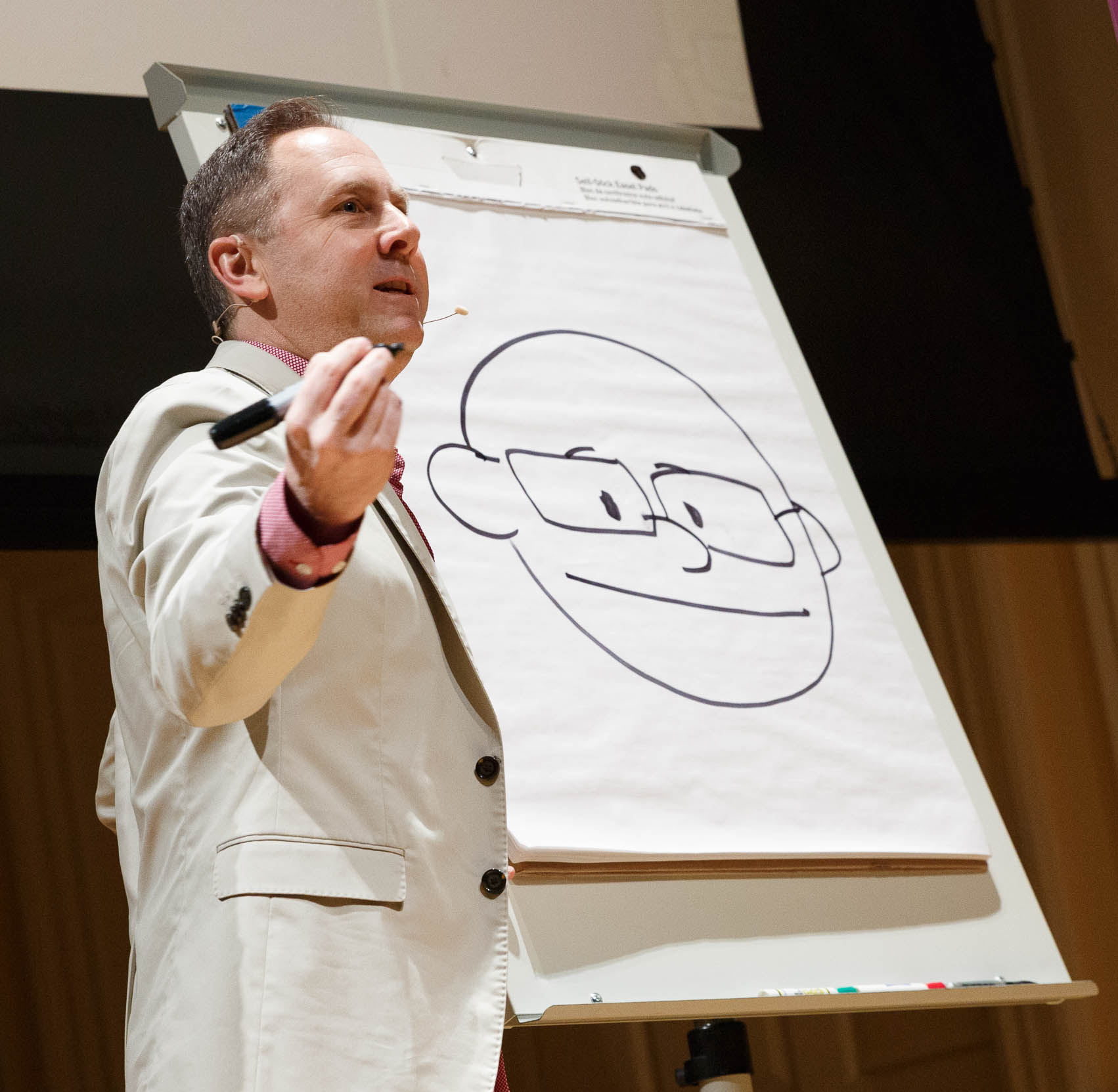
Eliopoulos presents in 2019

Eliopoulos is known as a prolific letterer, in particular for hand-lettering the first 100 issues of the ongoing Savage Dragon series, even after much of the comic book industry (including Eliopoulos himself, on other titles) had come to rely on computer-generated fonts for dialogue; this was done at Savage Dragon creator Erik Larsen's request; Larsen preferring the individual look of hand-lettered dialogue.

He designed the fonts for Marvel Comics' in-house computer lettering unit. He has also contributed lettering work to Valiant Comics, DC Comics, and other publishers. For Dark Horse Comics, Eliopoulos wrote and/or drew some Star Wars stories.

Eliopoulos is also known for his comic strip Desperate Times, which showcases art admittedly inspired by the work of Bill Watterson of Calvin and Hobbes fame. Desperate Times features the misadventures of bachelor losers Marty and Toad, which ran as a back-up feature in Savage Dragon, and later Desperate Times comics from Savage Dragon publisher Image Comics and AAArgh! Comics, a part of After Hours Press.

Eliopoulos quoted in interview about art inspiration.

Visually. I was REALLY into Bloom County at the time--still am--and that spoke to me more. But I liked his (Watterson's) zaniness as well. It pushed me to be a better cartoonist. I realized that comic strips didn't have to look so bad--they could look amazing. Between the two is where I would love to do a strip. The all-out humor of Bloom County with the quality art of a Calvin and Hobbes.

Following the September 11 attacks, Eliopoulos contributed a story to a Marvel Comics benefit book about how his family was affected by the event, which shares the date of his wedding anniversary.

He is the artist and co-writer on Marvel Comics' former back-up feature and current series of one-shot comics, Franklin Richards: Son of a Genius, teamed with writer Marc Sumerak. The first one-shot in the series was nominated for an Eisner Award and a Harvey Award in 2005.

Eliopoulos also created a daily webcomic, Misery Loves Sherman, until abandoning it around 2015. He has contributed cartoon strips to the book series The Complete Idiot's Guide... and to Sports Illustrated.

On January 14, 2014 Dial Books published I am Amelia Earhart and I am Abraham Lincoln, the first two books in writer Brad Meltzer's series of over 50 children's books, Ordinary People Change the World, which are illustrated by Eliopoulos. The series focused on historical figures (six books were compilations) such as Martin Luther King Jr., Albert Einstein, Rosa Parks, Helen Keller, Lucille Ball, Sacagawea, and Jackie Robinson. Eliopoulos promoted the series during an October 7, 2016 appearance on the NBC talk show Late Night with Seth Meyers, which included a live drawing demonstration in which Meyers participated.

Eliopoulos appeared as a guest on the August 8, 2020 episode of The George Lucas Talk Show with fellow guest Lauren Lapkus, in which he discussed his work and career with "retired filmmaker George Lucas" (actor and comedian Connor Ratliff).

== Reception ==
Doug Zawisza, reviewing the 2011 Fear Itself miniseries for Comic Book Resources, praised Eliopoulos' lettering, singling issue #4 in particular, for which he positively compared Eliopoulous' work to letterer John Workman, to whom Zawisza felt Eliopoulos was paying homage.

== Awards ==
Awards include:

- 2002, 2003, and 2005 Wizard Fan Award "Favorite Letterer"
- 2007 "Best Letterer" Eagle Award
- 2008 "Best Letterer" Harvey Award, for Daredevil

Nominations include:

- 2006 "Best Letterer" Eisner Award
- 2006 "Best Letterer" Eagle Award
- 2008 "Special Award for Humor" Harvey Award, for Franklin Richards
- 2008 "Best letterer" Eagle Award

== Bibliography ==
- Franklin Richards: Son of a Genius (writer, artist and letterer with co-author Marc Sumerak, Marvel Comics)
- Civil War (letterer, Marvel Comics)
- Kick-Ass (letterer, Icon Comics)
- A Little Emotional (author, Rocket Pond Books; 2023)
