= The Last Dark =

2013 novel by Stephen R. Donaldson

- Cover art depicting Caerwood ur-Mahrtiir.
- Author: Stephen R. Donaldson
- Cover artist: John Jude Palencar
- Language: English
- Series: The Last Chronicles of Thomas Covenant
- Genre: Fantasy
- Publisher: Gollancz (UK)
- Publication date: October 15, 2013
- Publication place: United States
- Media type: Print
- Pages: 592 pp. (English paperback)
- ISBN: 978-0-575-07602-0
- Preceded by: Against All Things Ending

The Last Dark is a fantasy novel by American writer Stephen R. Donaldson, the final book of The Last Chronicles of Thomas Covenant, ending the story that Donaldson began in 1977 with Lord Foul's Bane. It was published on October 15, 2013.

In April 2013 a preview of chapter three was made available at the author's official website.

== Plot ==
=== Part one ===
On the promontory where Foul's Creche once stood, Thomas Covenant, Clyme, and Branl are met by Covenant's old Haruchai companion Brinn, who became the Guardian of the One Tree during his quest for a second Staff of Law. The aged Brinn renounces the Humbled's actions, likening their Mastery of the Land to "simony" and stating his shame. The Humbled, who hold ak-Haru Brinn in great respect, are affected by his judgments, but do not relent. They are further troubled by him when Brinn then chooses to ignore them; with the Worm of the World's End roused, Brinn has arrived to give Covenant counsel and healing. He informs Covenant that following Joan's death, the Raver turiya Herem has fled north to Sarangrave Flat in an attempt to possess Horrim Carabal, the lurker of the Sarangrave. Brinn advises that Covenant kill the Raver rather than return to Linden, and cryptically reminds him that the krill is "capable of much". Brinn then heals him from the hurts gained from Joan, but also causes Covenant to fall unconscious.

When Covenant rouses, he and the Humbled use wild magic to teleport several times towards the Sarangrave. The Raver has already begun his attack on the lurker, but because the lurker is so large, he cannot possess it easily or quickly. With the help of the Feroce and the lurker's consent, Covenant uses the krill to chop off the possessed tentacle and jumps into the swamp after it, attempting to kill the Raver inside. Before he can reach the sinking tentacle, Branl pulls him out of the water and Clyme allows turiya Herem to possess him, and in turn Clyme holds the Raver within him (similarly to Grimmand Honninscrave's actions in Revelstone). Remembering that samadhi Sheol was only "rent", Branl uses the krill to disembowel Clyme and brutally chops him into pieces, killing both him and the Raver.

The lurker, grateful that Covenant and the Haruchai have exceeded the terms of their alliance, offers hurtloam to the two. Before leaving, Covenant asks the Feroce to convey a message to Linden to "remember forbidding". They then travel eastwards via teleportation with wild magic, watching the Worm of the World's End in the Sunbirth Sea as it draws towards the Land and Mount Thunder. Covenant instructs that the lurker block the Worm's senses with its sheer mass, thereby temporarily slowing it down; with the aid of the surviving ur‑viles and Waynhim, it does so successfully. Confident that he has done all he can, Covenant then heads back west with Branl.

Meanwhile, following their victory against Infelice of the Elohim, Linden, Jeremiah, and Stave return to Mahrtiir and the Giants. Jeremiah wants to build a structure of malachite to hold and protect the Elohim from the Worm. After the Feroce arrive to forward Covenant's message and help her interpret it, Linden realizes that they will need the ancient Forestal lore of forbidding to keep the Worm from simply destroying the structure with all the Elohim inside. She makes a caesure and travels back in time with Mahrtiir and their two Ranyhyn, intending to meet the Forestal Caer-Caveral.

With no food and little sleep, Stave and the Giants exhaust themselves helping Jeremiah build the structure using malachite scavenged from the side of a massive ridge; Stave himself suffers disassociated mental exhaustion after struggling to knock down a large slab by himself while the Giants sleep.

When the structure is finished, Infelice arrives and attempts to slay Jeremiah, claiming him to be an abomination, but is surprised to find that the structure he has built is not a jail, but a "fane" – a temple that they can choose to leave when they want. When she is informed by the Giants that they will stand by Jeremiah, Infelice acknowledges that the Elohim do not have friends and allows herself and the Elohim to be drawn inside. Jeremiah is possessed by Kastenessen in the same way that Anele was possessed by him, but Stave severely hurts himself by throwing Jeremiah onto the top of the structure, away from physical contact with the grass, breaking his possession. Kastenessen himself then appears and towers over the shrine; he raises his human fist (which was originally Roger Covenant's) in an attempt to destroy the shrine and all of the remaining Elohim in the world, but Lostson Longwrath emerges from behind a crater nearby and fulfills his geas by cutting off Kastenessen's hand. Kastenessen kills Longwrath, but before he can summon the Earthpower and fire necessary to destroy the shrine, Covenant appears with Branl and drives Kastenessen back towards Infelice with the krill and wild magic. Kastenessen states that he is only an abomination, but Infelice explains that he is the only Elohim to have ever loved and been loved; she acknowledges that the Elohim have been cruel to him, and asks that he allow them to heal him. Before entering the structure with Kastenessen, Infelice reminds the Giants that Lord Foul desperately wants Jeremiah. With Kastenessen now isolated from Mount Thunder and She Who Must Not Be Named, Kevin's Dirt disappears.

In the Land's past, the Ranyhyn bear Linden and Mahrtiir to Caerroil Wildwood instead of Caer-Caveral. In the time after Lord Foul's first defeat by Covenant, she meets Wildwood at Gallows Howe; he is tired of caring for the trees for many thousands of years and explains that forbidding is not lore, but essence. Mahrtiir requests to become a Forestal. Wildwood obliges and then sacrifices himself to allow them to return to their present.

Following their ordeal, Covenant attempts to help the Giants grieve by giving Longwrath's corpse a caamora with wild magic, but is interrupted by Linden's return. Mahrtiir, as the new Forestal Caerwood ur-Mahrtiir, sprouts nature and aliantha in front of the shrine's entrance. Covenant asks Linden to marry him; she accepts and they exchange rings and embrace.

=== Part two ===
The group head to Mount Thunder to confront Lord Foul, knowing they can do nothing more to stop the Worm, which has altered its course to Melenkurion Skyweir. Just east of the mountain, they are set upon by skurj and Sandgorgons led by the remnants of the Raver samadhi. The Swordmainnir and Haruchai are reinforced with Giants who have arrived from Dire's Vessel (the ship the Swordmainnir arrived on) under directions from Brinn, who had died from old age shortly after arriving on board the ship. The lurker creates a flood that kills the skurj while Covenant summons the Fire-Lions once again, who kill the Sandgorgons.

Inside the mountain, the group are ambushed by Cavewights inside the Wightwarrens, but join up with two hundred Haruchai led by Handir after Bhapa and Pahni convinced them to confront Linden. Unaware that Covenant had returned to life, they decide to fight alongside him and confront Lord Foul – something the Haruchai had never done before. As many Cavewights continue the attack, Covenant, Linden, Jeremiah, the remaining Swordmainnir and Giants, Branl, Stave, Bhapa, Pahni, and the Masters fight towards Kiril Threndor as the Worm of the World's End starts to drink the Earthblood at Melenkurion Skyweir.

Before reaching Kiril Threndor, Linden uses wild magic to return to the Lost Deep in an effort to stop She Who Must Not Be Named. With the help of the remaining ur‑viles and Waynhim, Linden uses wild magic to transfer several victims into the Demondim-spawn and saves the bane. Covenant finds Lord Foul and his own son Roger in Kiril Threndor. A fight ensues, and Jeremiah is possessed by the last remaining Raver; in an attempt to help Lord Foul trap the Creator using one of Jeremiah's constructs, the Raver attempts to show Jeremiah memories he had learned when he last possessed his mother – of Linden's father killing himself and her killing her mother – but Jeremiah instead sees memories of the Land's past and learns much lore. Jeremiah overpowers the Raver, and he escapes. Roger is killed in despair by Lord Foul when he realizes that he cannot escape his mortality. Jeremiah forbids Lord Foul from escaping creation. Linden returns and She Who Must Not Be Named slams into Lord Foul before leaving, severely weakening him. Thomas Covenant absorbs Lord Foul and, as the earthquake that has been destroying the Earth reduces Kiril Threndor to rubble, Covenant, Linden, and Jeremiah "[step] into the wake of the World's End and [rise] like glory", fixing the Arch of Time.

=== Epilogue ===
Covenant, Linden, and Jeremiah, now dressed in sendaline robes and glowing silver, travel west through Andelain. They meet Infelice, who congratulates them on saving the world and states that the Elohim have returned the Worm to slumber. Later they meet Caerwood ur-Mahrtiir and the remaining ur‑viles and Waynhim, who have also become Forestals. After a short discussion, and eager to repair the Land and help it grow, they take their leave. Finally, they reach the survivors of those who helped them in the Land. Following Handir's death in the Wightwarrens, Stave has become the Voice of the Masters. Stave expresses his wish to reform the old Council of Lords instead of continuing as Masters, and asks the Giants to aid him in this and educate the humans of the Land of their past. Jeremiah promises to inform them of the locations of Kevin's Wards. Branl aims to return to Mount Thunder both in search of the krill and hoping to make peace with the Cavewights now that Foul no longer goads them to madness. In the distance, an Insequent beckons toward Covenant, Linden, and Jeremiah, and they take their leave as the sun rises.

== Reception ==
Tor.com's David Moran summarized his review by saying that "even in a work inflated by his worst tendencies, Donaldson builds toward a staggering resolution of love, endurance, and self-sacrifice that only he could have written. Donaldson is unquestionably a master of cinematic action and the steady build to an explosive end. He has a special talent for disastrous climaxes, and this book is no exception. It is a fitting end for a unique, complicated, great fantasy epic."

Goodreads and Barnes & Noble rate the book 4.03/5 and 4.5/5 respectively, based on user reviews.
