= Mordant's Need =

Fantasy book series by Stephen R. Donaldson

The Mirror of Her Dreams
- First edition cover
- Author: Stephen R. Donaldson
- Language: English
- Series: Mordant's Need
- Genre: Fantasy
- Publisher: Del Rey
- Publication date: 1986
- Publication place: United States
- Media type: Print (Hardback & Paperback)
- Pages: 626 (first edition, hardback)
- Followed by: A Man Rides Through

Mordant's Need is a fantasy two-part book series by American writer Stephen R. Donaldson, comprising the novels The Mirror of Her Dreams (1986) and A Man Rides Through (1987).

== Synopsis ==
It tells the story of a woman named Terisa who travels from our modern world to a medieval setting through a mirror, where political and military struggles are entwined with the power of Imagery, a form of magic based on mirrors. The Mirror of Her Dreams, the first volume, was published in 1986 and A Man Rides Through, the second volume, was published in 1987. The books deal with themes of reality, power, inaction and love in the context of a fantasy adventure. This series is much lighter in tone than Donaldson's The Chronicles of Thomas Covenant, the Unbeliever or The Gap Cycle.

== Plot summary ==
Terisa Morgan opens the series living a vacant life, supported by her father from afar and volunteering at a mission for lack of anything more purposeful to do with her time. She fills her apartment with mirrors so as to see her reflection, and thus be constantly reassured of her existence. Geraden, an apprentice Imager (a type of magician) from a land called Mordant, appears in her apartment, searching for aid against a powerful enemy who has been plaguing Mordant with monsters translated from other worlds. As mirrors are inextricably linked with magic in Mordant, Terisa's home decor convinces him that he has stumbled into the lair of a powerful sorceress. He persuades her to accompany him back to the snowbound castle of Orison, where she finds herself embroiled in a morass of intrigue and danger from both the political plotting of a corrupt court and from the frightening magical creatures that appear without warning and can't seem to be defended against. As she soon finds out, the mirrors of this world show anything but what is in front of them; in fact, mirrors are gateways to other worlds (or to a different point in the same world) and could be manipulated in a variety of ways to effect what amounts to magic.

Terisa is suddenly the center of attention, a position that she has never before held, which is not easy because Geraden is held in little regard at the castle; so court opinion naturally is divided on whether she should be taken seriously as a potentially powerful ally, threat, or treated as an object of ridicule and proof of Geraden's perceived incompetence. She must deal with the ever-earnest Geraden, the (seemingly) senile King Joyse and his headstrong daughters, the mad Adept Havelock, the inimical Castellan Lebbick, Geraden's mostly-well-meaning brothers, the lascivious Master Eremis and the rest of the disorganized group of Imager masters Geraden belongs to known collectively as the Congery.

Unsurprisingly, the story twists and turns, very little is as it seems in Orison and various groups plot to depose King Joyse and take over Mordant. The mysterious rogue Imager is still sending magical creatures to cause destruction seemingly without rhyme or reason; the High King's Monomach, the best swordsmen in the land, appears in Orison by seemingly impossible translations; and Geraden remains firmly convinced that he has not made a mistake and that Terisa definitely is to be Mordant's champion and salvation despite her own doubts, protests, and debilitating passivity.

== Main characters ==
- Terisa Morgan: Terisa grew up mostly ignored by her rich parents, and has become extremely passive and self-effacing as a result. She often feels as if she is unreal, which can only be countered by seeing a reflection of herself in one of her many mirrors. She agrees to help Geraden because he looks at her so earnestly she knows she is real, at least, to him.
- Geraden: the youngest of seven brothers, Geraden is clumsy and prone to embarrassing himself in front of others. Chosen to seek the champion by an augury, his magic is considered to have gone awry when he finds Terisa instead of the great warrior everyone was expecting.
- King Joyse: once a formidable warrior, Joyse managed to unite the warring Cares of Mordant into one nation under his rule, in order to pull the teeth of neighboring lands of Cadwall and the Alend Kingdom. He created the Congery, a group of Imagers devoted to studying how Imagery could be used for good, and forced every Imager to join it. Now, with a rogue Imager or Imagers sending horror after horror into the kingdom, he appears to have become weak and diffident about the fate of the world.
- Elega, Myste, and Torrent, the King's daughters: Elega is the eldest; pragmatic and headstrong, she is furious with her father for his inaction. Myste is a dreamer, who has faith that somehow things will work out. Torrent, the youngest, is estranged from her father, as she followed her mother back to her childhood Care in protest of the King's refusal to act.
- Master Havelock: Formerly Joyse's personal Imager and best friend, Havelock was driven mad by going through a flat mirror but has rare moments of partial lucidity.
- Castellan Lebbick: The man in charge of the castle's defense, he is loyal to Joyse because he cannot believe in anything else. He is tormented by the rape and murder of his wife by enemy soldiers during the Alend-Cadwall wars.
- Master Eremis: One of the Imagers in the Congery, he suggests that Terisa did not exist until she came to Mordant, but this doesn't stop him from trying to seduce her at every turn.
- Prince Kragen: Son of the Alend Monarch and hopeful heir to the throne, he is sent as his father's emissary to King Joyse to learn how Joyse plans to defeat the threat from Imagery.
- Artagel: Geraden's eldest brother, he is the best swordsman in Mordant.
- Vagel: formerly an imager from Cadwall, he is an Arch-Imager, one who can pass through flat mirrors without going mad. He is responsible for Havelock's condition, but long rumored to be dead
- Gart: the High King of Cadwall's Monomach; an assassin highly trained in every manner of weaponry, fighting, and clandestine murder.

== Themes ==
The story deals deeply with themes of what reality is, and how we can know what is real. Terisa is a troubled young woman who doubts the reality of her own existence, even before she is summoned to Mordant, where the prevailing belief among Imagers is that the things they summon from their magic mirrors (such as Terisa) do not actually exist before Imagery brings them into the world of Mordant.

There is a similarity between the handling of this theme in Mordant's Need and in Donaldson's Thomas Covenant series, where Thomas Covenant, the Unbeliever, commits at least one reprehensible act because he refuses to believe that the world he perceives around him could be real. Mordant's Need can be read as a reflection, or mirror image, of the Covenant story, where the reality questioned is not the fantasy world and the reality of those around the male protagonist, but the original world and the female protagonist's own reality.

The dynamic between the aged King Joyse and his daughters strongly echoes Shakespeare's King Lear.

The author has written in an interview:

[T]he castle of Gormenghast was an "unconscious influence" on both Orison and Revelstone. "What a minute," you protest. "If it's 'unconscious,' how do you know it exists at all?" Well, because I read Peake's trilogy before I ever imagined the first "Covenant" books. And by the time I wrote "Mordant's Need," I had read Peake's trilogy twice. I wasn't *thinking* of Gormenghast when I created my own Big Castles (to my mind, Gormenghast is entirely different). Nevertheless Peake's writing must have influenced me *somehow*, if for no other reason than because I liked it so much.

== Books ==
- The Mirror of Her Dreams (1986)
- A Man Rides Through (1987)
