= Against All Things Ending =

2010 novel by Stephen R. Donaldson

- First edition (US)
- Author: Stephen R. Donaldson
- Cover artist: John Jude Palencar
- Language: English
- Series: The Last Chronicles of Thomas Covenant
- Genre: Fantasy
- Publisher: Putnam (US); Gollancz (UK)
- Publication date: October 19, 2010
- Publication place: United States
- Media type: Print (hardback)
- Pages: 624 pp. (English paperback)
- ISBN: 978-0-399-15678-6
- Preceded by: Fatal Revenant
- Followed by: The Last Dark

Against All Things Ending is a 2010 fantasy novel by American writer Stephen R. Donaldson. It is the third novel in The Last Chronicles of Thomas Covenant tetralogy, and the ninth novel in The Chronicles of Thomas Covenant overall. It was released on October 19, 2010, in the United States and on 28 October 2010 in the United Kingdom.

A preview of the book's first chapter is currently available in PDF form from the author's website.

== Plot introduction ==
Thomas Covenant is resurrected by Linden Avery. He is once again a leper, and his mind slips in and out of human reality as an after-effect of spending millennia as part of the Arch of Time. As a result of the combined use of wild magic, Earthpower, and Loric's krill, the Worm of the World's End has been awakened, and is moving towards the Land to drink of the Earthblood. This will result in the destruction of all things, the breaking of the Arch of Time which encompasses the Earth, and subsequently the release of Lord Foul. The Elohim are fleeing to the farthest reaches of the Earth to avoid being eaten by the Worm.

Major enemies to Linden and Thomas include Lord Foul, the Worm, Kastenessen, Roger Covenant, Joan Covenant (possessed by a Raver), She Who Must Not Be Named, and other creatures loosed upon the land. Linden Avery, accompanied by Ramen, Giants, and Haruchai, seeks to find a way to stop Joan's caesures, find and free her son Jeremiah, and stop the Worm of the World's End.

== Plot summary ==
After the resurrection of Thomas Covenant, his mind is fractured and often becomes lost among his vast memories of the Land's past acquired from existence as the Timewarden. Linden Avery resolves to find Jeremiah before confronting the newly awakened Worm of the World's End, when the Harrow appears and claims that he can take her to her son. It is the Harrow's purpose to confront the Worm, for which he requires the Staff of Law and the white gold ring; he demands to borrow them to use, in return for which he offers to retrieve Jeremiah. The Ardent, a representative of the Insequent, arrives to ensure that the Harrow does not betray Linden Avery. Thomas Covenant, who must struggle with his memories, takes the krill from its place in Andelain. However, his former wife Joan is able to attack Covenant with wild magic through the krill; also, without the krill's protection the skurj and the Sandgorgons (now controlled by the Raver samadhi Sheol) will lay waste to Andelain and the surrounding Salva Gildenbourne. Ultimately, with assurances from the Ardent – and, through him, the entire race of the Insequent – that the Harrow will not deal falsely, Linden agrees to the bargain, and surrenders the Staff and the ring. The Ardent is charged by his kindred to both constrain and assist the Harrow – which means that, by the innate law of the Insequent, his life is forfeit to failure as well.

The Harrow and the Ardent transport Linden and her companions to the Lost Deep, the ancient domain of the Viles, to find Jeremiah. There, at the great bridge the Viles called The Hazard, Anele becomes enraptured by the deep stone of the earth, and prophesies that the Worm will ultimately seek the Earthblood as its final sustenance: when the Worm drinks the Earthblood, the Arch of Time will fall. In witnessing this prophecy, the Ardent accomplishes one of his private goals; however, the Harrow fails to open the portal to the Lost Deep. Ultimately it is Linden, using the Staff, who is able to undo the Viles' magic due to the insight she gained from Caerroil Wildwood, and from her personal encounter with the Viles themselves in the Land's past. It is revealed that it was to steal this insight that motivated the Harrow's initial attempt to possess Linden, before he was denied by the Mahdoubt. By regaining the Staff, Linden also discovers that far beneath even the Lost Deep slumbers a powerful bane called She Who Must Not Be Named – a tormented avatar of countless betrayed women throughout history, including Kastenessen's lover, and the banished wife of the Creator, Diassomer Mininderain. Linden discovers that it is this bane which is the source of Kevin's Dirt. The bane slumbers, however, and without any conceivable means to oppose it, the party leaves it sleeping, and enter the Lost Deep.

While Linden's companions are held enthralled by the wonders of the Viles' ancient abode, the Harrow leaves them to take Jeremiah for his own ambitious schemes. There, he confronts the croyel, which hides in one of Jeremiah's constructs designed to conceal it from the Elohim (who had previously told Linden they were unable to free her son). Liand attacks it, and the croyel nearly kills him. The Harrow believes that due to this construct, the croyel will be unable to summon aid – meaning Roger (who was gifted one of the mad Elohim Kastenessen's hands, and therefore has some Elohim powers). However, the croyel surprises him by summoning skest instead, and the party are nearly overwhelmed. In desperation, Linden destroys the construct, which immediately allows Roger to transport himself to the fight, where he promptly murders the Harrow. Before Roger can claim the Staff and ring, however, his father intervenes, battling against him with Loric's krill. Through the krill, Joan exerts her power to harm Covenant, and his hands are so badly burned that Linden is later forced to amputate his remaining fingertips. With Stave's aid against the croyel, Linden is able to combine forces with Covenant to force Roger to flee. At last Esmer arrives, with the ur‑viles and Waynhim, and prevents Roger from fleeing with Jeremiah. Covenant is able to capture the croyel using the krill, and Esmer takes Roger and transports him away from the fight; he shortly returns with a group of Waynhim and ur‑viles, who assist the party to escape.

The conflict of these forces awakens She Who Must Not Be Named. Linden and her companions follow the ur‑viles and Waynhim in seeking a way out, and rely heavily on the strength and endurance of Ironhand Coldspray and her Swordmainnir. By holding the croyel at bay with the threat of the krill – one of few weapons that can slay the monster – the party are able to bring Jeremiah and the croyel with them. The skurj also arrive to worsen the situation. Exposed more intimately to the bane's evil than the other party members by her Earthsight – and being a more ready target due to her family history of abuse and despair – Linden's hope finally fails when the party is cornered, and she falls into a catatonic state, deeply traumatized. Covenant first tries to reason with She Who Must Not be Named, then tries to convince Esmer to reveal her true name which would release her. When Esmer refuses, Covenant asks Anele to use Liand's orcrest stone to summon the spirits of his parents, Sunder and Hollian. They leave, however, and summon High Lord Elena's spirit as bait for She Who Must Not Be Named. This ploy succeeds at delaying She Who Must Not Be Named from attacking the group. As Elena is being consumed Covenant convinces Esmer to leave them, which allows the Ardent to transport the company away.

The Ardent transports the group to a location near Landsdrop. The Ardent can no longer assist them since he failed to protect the Harrow, and begins to madden and die, though through him the race of the Insequent announce that he has become the greatest among them. Somewhat later, as a final service to Linden, he transports the Cords to Revelstone, so that they might convince the Masters to march against the Sandgorgons and skurj that are attacking the Upper Land. In the meantime, the party rest and recuperate from their narrow escape from death. Linden is recalled from her catatonic state by Covenant, but her yearning for his love is (from her point of view) spurned. She grows bitter towards him as a result, and refocuses herself on the plight of her son.

After a failed attempt by Linden to free Jeremiah from the croyel – during which the flames of Earthpower which she draws from the staff are tainted black, apparently permanently – the group are attacked by caesures, brought on by Joan's awareness of Linden's attempted use of wild magic. No fewer than six caesures assail the company, and in the chaos Anele touches the dirt and is possessed by Kastenessen; the mad Elohim immediately kills Liand in an effort to protect the croyel. After Linden quenches the caesures, the Giants and Stave construct a rocky cairn for the slain Stonedownor, whose lover Pahni is inconsolable. The devastated group is soon attacked again by Roger and an army of Cavewights. During the battle, Galt sacrifices himself to protect Anele, indicating an alteration in the Humbled's stance towards the menace of his Earthpower. Anele then uses Liand's orcrest and sacrifices his life to both slay the croyel, and to transfer his innate Earthpower, and heritage as the "Last hope of the Land" into Jeremiah. During the battle, Esmer arrives in yet another attempt to betray Linden for Kastenessen, but is pursued by the ur‑viles, who at last reveal the purpose of the manacles they had forged: they capture Esmer with them, restraining his power and freeing the wild magic to act. Infuriated by the loss of Anele and Galt, and exalted by the rescue of her son, Linden wields the white gold and utterly routs Roger and his Cavewights.

In the battle's aftermath, it is revealed that Jeremiah remains locked in his isolated mental state, and that Galt was actually Stave's son, though the two had become estranged by Stave's repudiation of the Masters. As for Esmer, the tormented half-Haruchai begs Linden for the release of death, but she cannot bring herself to do it, even though the required weapon, the krill, is at hand. Stave sees this and kills Esmer as an act of mercy – upon both Esmer and Linden, so that she would not have to. Finally, with help from the Giants, whose gift of tongues is restored upon Esmer's death, Linden is finally able to communicate with the ur‑vile loremaster, whom she thanks and promises to give assistance to at some later time. The Demondim-spawn then depart.

Abruptly, Covenant leaves with the two remaining Humbled to confront Joan. Linden and her companions follow the Ranyhyn, trusting the wise horses to know best what they must do next to confront the Land's doom. They lead Linden to a quarry of bones named Muirwin Delenoth. The bones belonged to quellvisks, an extinct race of monsters that Lord Foul created in an attempt to rouse the Worm by attacking the Elohim (this plot failed, and the quellvisks were eradicated by the Elohim). Unprompted, Jeremiah begins building a construct with the quellvisk bones, somehow using the ancient lost craft of anundivian yajna. The group are promptly targets of more than one foe: Joan, who begins assailing them with caesures; and Infelice, who appears and attempts to stop Jeremiah. She hints that Jeremiah's construct will capture the Elohim, which she cannot permit. She describes his actions as "ruin incarnate". She also warns that Lord Foul's "deeper purpose" (which he hinted at when Linden was summoned in The Runes of the Earth) is to use Jeremiah's power, after the fall of the Arch of Time, to create a prison for the Creator, allowing Foul to rule all universes. This, at last, is what has long been hinted at in references to "the shadow on the heart" of the Elohim: Infelice insists that Jeremiah's building must not be completed. In exchange for Linden stopping Jeremiah, Infelice offers a promise of the Elohim's protection for the boy, to ensure he does not fall back into the Despiser's hands. Linden refuses the bargain, and as a caesure attacks, Infelice binds Linden and Stave with enchantment, and moves to attack Jeremiah. However, Stave and Linden resist, and with the assistance of the Ranyhyn, Linden is able to throw Jeremiah's old toy race car (that Esmer had previously repaired) to her son, who uses it to complete his construct. Infelice vanishes, and it is revealed that the construct is a doorway into Jeremiah's mind enabling him to escape the prison of his mind and finally gain cognizance. At last he and his mother share an embrace, and Linden is able to believe "that her rent heart might heal".

Meanwhile, Thomas Covenant travels to the ruins of Foul's Creche to face Joan. He refuses to ride a Ranyhyn in accordance with his ancient bargain with them, so the Humbled's Ranyhyn bring with them the steed formerly ridden by the Harrow, which they compel to bear Covenant. On the journey he speaks to the Feroce, diminutive creatures who worship the Lurker of the Sarangrave. They are offshoots of the same race that produced the skest and the sur-jheherrin. The Feroce tell Covenant that the Lurker wants to be allied with Covenant, since it has realised the peril of the Worm as a common enemy. Covenant accepts this alliance, and the Feroce later help him when they battle with the skest. Covenant reaches Joan by entering a caesure; Branl and Clyme follow him with Haruchai loyalty, though Covenant is able to free only himself from the warped instant of time. He realises that Joan is beyond reach as she rebukes his efforts to help her, and intends to kill him. Covenant calls the Ranyhyn, who are able to distract Joan – due to her love of horses. The distraction provides him the opportunity to drive the krill through Joan's heart, ending the caesure and freeing the Humbled. turiya Herem, the Raver who had possessed Joan, flees, and Covenant takes his ex-wife's wedding ring, stripping Foul and his allies of the white gold.

Covenant and the Humbled climb onto the shore to evade a tidal wave caused by the Worm's approach to the Land; they survive, though the Humbled's Ranyhyn mounts are lost. The morning sun has failed to dawn, and Thomas Covenant watches as the stars begin to wink out, one by one.

== Characters ==
- Thomas Covenant
- Linden Avery
- Jeremiah (Adopted son of Linden Avery)
- Roger Covenant (Son of Thomas Covenant)
- Joan (Former wife of Thomas Covenant; Mother of Roger)
- Anele (Son of Sunder and Hollian)
- Stave (A Haruchai; a Master of the Land)
- Liand (Stonedowner)
- Esmer (Son of Cail and the merewives)
- Mahrtiir (Manethrall of the Ramen)
- Bhapa (Cord of the Ramen)
- Pahni (Cord of the Ramen)
- Branl (Humbled of the Masters)
- Galt (Humbled of the Masters; son of Stave)
- Clyme (Humbled of the Masters)
- the Harrow (Insequent)
- the Ardent (Insequent)
- Rime Coldspray (Ironfist of the Swordmainnir of the Giants)
- She Who Must Not Be Named (Bane)
- Hyn (Ranyhyn)
- Hynyn (Ranyhyn)
- Infelice (Elohim)
