= Jehannum =

Jehannum may refer to:

- Jahannam, the Islamic conception of Hell.
- Jehannum, a character in The Chronicles of Thomas Covenant, the Unbeliever.
