= Chaos and Order =

1994 novel by Stephen R. Donaldson

- Author: Stephen R. Donaldson
- Language: English
- Series: The Gap Cycle
- Genre: Science fiction
- Publisher: Bantam Books/Spectra
- Publication date: 1994
- Publication place: United States
- Media type: Print (Hardback & Paperback)
- ISBN: 0-553-57253-9 (USA hardback)
- OCLC: 32833561
- Preceded by: A Dark and Hungry God Arises
- Followed by: This Day All Gods Die

Chaos and Order (or officially The Gap into Madness: Chaos and Order) is a science fiction novel by American writer Stephen R. Donaldson, the fourth book of The Gap Cycle series. It was published in 1994.

In Chaos and Order, the character of Angus Thermopyle finally admits that his violence toward Morn is rooted in his longing for recognition by her.

== Plot summary ==
Following the assassination of Godsen Frik, the former Director of Protocol for the United Mining Companies Police (UMCP), Hashi Lebwohl, the Director of the Data Acquisition (DA) branch of the UMCP, attempts to investigate how security failed to prevent the so-called "kaze" attacks. Hashi learns that they were using more recent security badges that contained up-to-date security codes. As part of his investigation, Hashi accompanies Koina Hannish, Godsen's successor as Director of Protocol, to Earth to attend an emergency session of the GCES. It is there that, as Koina informed Hashi, Captain Vertigus will propose a bill of severance that will sever the UMCP from the UMC and merge it with the GCES so as to avoid the conflict of interest between UMC CEO Holt Fasner and the rest of humanity.

Captain Vertigus manages to propose his bill to the GCES as Hashi recognizes a security guard as former Captain Nathan Alt. Hashi surmises that he is a kaze and is surprised that, instead of attacking Captain Vertigus, seems to be heading for the UMC's First Executive Assistant, Cleatus Fane. Hashi grabs Alt's IDs intact, which strangely identify him as one "Clay Imposs", before having him arrested. Alt/Imposs promptly explodes.

Meanwhile, a cyborg named Angus Thermopyle is fleeing the newly destroyed Billingate installation in Forbidden Space with his makeshift crew.

As luck would have it, Vector Shaheed was one of the lead scientists working on an anti-mutagen drug. The Amnion, the beings that inhabit Forbidden Space, would have their mutagens turn the entire human race into Amnion themselves, and the immunity drug that Vector was working on would have assured humanity their safety. The UCMP took Shaheed's research away from him and suppressed the drug on Holt Fasner's orders. Hashi Lebwohl secretly finished Shaheed's research and gave a sample of the drug to Nick Succorso to test. With samples of the drug in their possession, the crew of Trumpet decide to have Vector complete his research at an illegal lab run by a man named Deaner Beckmann. It is hoped, assuming Vector can complete his research, that the drug can be disseminated to the rest of humanity to protect them should the Amnion invade human space. On their way into human space Angus’ programming has him send a message using a listening post to UMCPHQ coded for Warden Dios, the director of the UMCP itself. After sending the message Trumpet speeds off toward the Valdor Industrial system where the lab is located deep within an asteroid swarm orbiting a binary star.

Having previously been sent to the very same listening post on orders from Warden Dios to await the return of Thermopyle, Min Donner and the crew aboard the UMCP cruiser Punisher are there to witness Trumpet's transmission and successive flight. They also happen upon Free Lunch, a ship that we learn was hired by Hashi to destroy Trumpet, as well as an unknown ship in hot pursuit from Forbidden Space. Min and Punisher's crew assume that the pursuing craft either belongs to the misanthropic Amnion, or is in their employ. Despite the protests of Punishers captain, Dolph Ubikwe, Min ignores the possibility that the encroaching ship is Amnioni and in the process of committing an act of war, and she has Punisher pursue Trumpet. Min soon receives instructions from Warden Dios to contact Thermopyle and get him to give his priority codes to Nick Succorso.

After framing Angus, abusing Morn, and attempting to sell Morn and Davies to the Amnion, Nick is a prisoner aboard Trumpet. When he receives Angus' priority codes he proceeds to have most of the crew beaten and locked in quarters for betraying him. Fortunately Nick decides to proceed with the plan to reproduce the immunity drug, although he hopes to sell it rather than give it away.

When Trumpet arrives at Beckmann's lab they discover that the ship that was pursuing them had guessed where they might go and has already arrived. Soar is a human ship in the Amnion's employ captained by Sorus Chatelaine, a woman who betrayed and scarred Nick as a young man, something he wants revenge for.

Through Soar the Amnion hope to capture the crew of Trumpet for study. For that reason they have placed an Amnioni aboard, the former human Milos Taverner.

Trumpet docks at the illegal lab, and while Mikka, Ciro, Vector, Sib and Nick go aboard the station, Angus' programming has him deliver his priority codes to Morn and Davies. Because of this the Hylands are able to help Angus release himself from his programming.

While aboard the station Nick arranges for Ciro to be alone as a trap. Sorus takes the "bait" and kidnaps him and Sorus and Milos inject Ciro with a slow acting mutagen that will change him if he stops taking an inhibiter every hour. Sorus tells Ciro that she will continue to supply him with the inhibiter if he sabotages Trumpet's drives.

When Vector finishes his work and everyone returns, Morn and Davies are able to incapacitate Nick once more and they retake the ship. Ciro reveals what Sorus did to him and Vector is able to cure him using the immunity drug.

When Trumpet undocks from the lab, Soar destroys the installation and chases Trumpet as they attempt to leave the asteroid swarm.

Nick convinces the rest to let him go EVA and attack Soar by himself as she chases Trumpet. The rest let him when Sib tells them he’ll go with him to help make sure he doesn’t attack Trumpet. Nick and Sib manage to disable Soar's most devastating weapon, a super-light proton cannon, before both are, presumably, killed.

Free Lunch and Soar engage Trumpet at the same time and end up attacking each other when Trumpet seems to have lost thrust, appearing sabotaged. Angus goes EVA and launches a singularity grenade at Free Lunch and detonates it. The resulting black hole destroys Free Lunch and batters Soar badly.

When Trumpet and Soar reach the edge of the swarm, they run into Punisher and an Amnion "defensive" named Calm Horizons heavily engaging each other. Nick suddenly appears on Soar's bridge, having survived Sorus' attack and the black hole in EVA. Sorus dispatches him and then Milos before ordering her crew to engage Calm Horizons and betray her former masters.

Calm Horizons destroys Soar but Trumpet and Punisher escape, leaving the Amnioni ship behind.
