= Forbidden Knowledge =

1991 novel by Stephen R. Donaldson

- Author: Stephen R. Donaldson
- Language: English
- Series: The Gap Cycle
- Genre: Science fiction
- Publisher: Bantam Books/Spectra
- Publication date: 1991
- Publication place: United States
- Media type: Print (Hardback & Paperback)
- ISBN: 0-553-29760-0 (USA hardback)
- OCLC: 26342214
- Preceded by: The Real Story
- Followed by: A Dark and Hungry God Arises

Forbidden Knowledge (or officially The Gap into Vision: Forbidden Knowledge) is a science fiction novel by American writer Stephen R. Donaldson, the second book of The Gap Cycle series. It was published in 1991.

== Plot ==
After Angus Thermopyle was framed and arrested for stealing station supplies from Com-Mine, Morn Hyland escaped with Captain Nick Succorso aboard his ship, the Captain's Fancy. As part of a deal Morn made with Angus, she will not reveal to anyone that she has a zone implant - a device Angus installed in her brain allowing him to control her while he raped and abused her - meaning that Angus will not face death for unauthorized use of a zone implant, and in turn Angus gave Morn the zone implant control. With the control in her hands she soon becomes addicted to the effects of a zone implant.

Nick misinterpreted Morn's intentions and expects her to 'repay' him by being his new lover. The abuse Morn suffered under Angus has left her unable to stand the touch of another man, but she soon works out how to use the zone implant to induce artificial sexual desire to fulfil Nick's desires.

While on board the Captain's Fancy, the data first Orn Vorbuld repeatedly molests Morn whenever they end up alone together, eventually leading to a showdown with Nick after Orn attempts to rape her. Orn reveals that he has planted a virus in the ship's computer that, if not deactivated by him, will wipe the computer's memory and leave the ship stranded in space. In spite of this, Nick still kills him and the ship soon falls under the effects of the virus.

Meanwhile, Morn discovers that she has become pregnant, and the age of the fetus indicates that Angus Thermopyle is the father. Reflecting on the death of her family, she decides to keep it, which Nick allows her on the condition that she is able to stop the virus. She does so, and Nick keeps his end of the bargain, but not in a way Morn expected: Nick sets course for Enablement Station, an outpost in Forbidden Space, a region of space controlled by the mysterious Amnion.

The Amnion are a race of creatures whose society is centered around their ability to manipulate DNA. They intend on dominating the human species through use of mutagens that would turn humans into Amnion themselves, but for now are held at bay in their section of the universe - what humans call forbidden space. No one but pirates and other illegals ever deal with the Amnion for fear that they themselves will be turned into Amnion, but Nick maintains that they would never go back on their word for fear that if they did no humans would deal with them.

Once they arrive at the station Nick convinces the Amnion to give them enough credit to fix their gap drive (which was damaged previously) and to force grow Morn's unborn child to adulthood, in exchange for a phial of Nick's blood, which the Amnion mistakenly believe holds the key to genetic immunity to their mutagens (the "immunity" is actually caused by a drug, of which the Amnion are unaware).

The Amnion keep their promises and give Nick the credit he asked for and force grow Morn's baby to the approximate age of 16. Her mind is copied onto her son, a traumatic process which she survives only due to the effects of her zone implant. Nick becomes enraged when he sees Morn's child, named Davies Hyland after her father; Davies is the spitting image of his real father, Angus Thermopyle. After getting back to the ship the Amnion inadvertently reveal the existence of Morn's zone implant when they explain that it protected her from the brain damage a mind imprint would cause. Nick realizes that Morn's love for him was all a masque and when the Amnion request that they return Davies Hyland to them for experimentation, Nick complies in return for parts to fix his gap drive.

Morn soon manages to hold the ship and Enablement station hostage by putting the ship's self-destruct on a pressure release trigger so she can get her child back, as well as the parts needed to fix the ship. They enable their gap drive but it begins to fail. Vector Shaheed, the ship's engineer, manages to avert a disaster and they survive, coming 'back into tard' with a slagged gap drive far from Enablement, but still in Amnion space. To everyone's surprise the ship is travelling at an unprecedented .9C, or nine tenths the speed of light. In the ensuing chaos, Nick is able to retake command of the ship.

Setting course for Thanatos Minor where an illegal trade outpost called Billingate resides, two Amnion warships catch up and Nick negotiates to have Davies transferred to one in an ejection pod. After being released from her cabin by some of the crew who no longer trust Nick, Morn manages to get the pod reprogrammed so that it misses the Amnion ship and heads toward Billingate.

In the meantime, the incarcerated Angus Thermopyle is tortured and interrogated on Com-Mine by Milos Taverner, the head of Com-Mine security. Eventually he is requisitioned by the UMCP and transformed into a cyborg, (a process known as "welding") under the complete control of the computers connected to his brain. The UMCP then prepares to send Milos and Angus together on a highly classified mission against Thanatos Minor.
