= Fatal Revenant =

2007 novel by Stephen R. Donaldson

- First edition cover
- Author: Stephen R. Donaldson
- Language: English
- Series: The Last Chronicles of Thomas Covenant
- Genre: Fantasy
- Publisher: Gollancz
- Publication date: 18 October 2007
- Publication place: United States
- Media type: Print (hardback)
- Pages: 896 pp (first edition, hardback)
- ISBN: 978-0-575-07600-6 (first edition, hardback)
- OCLC: 153556124
- Preceded by: The Runes of the Earth
- Followed by: Against All Things Ending

Fatal Revenant is a fantasy novel by American writer Stephen R. Donaldson, the second book of The Last Chronicles of Thomas Covenant series.

Linden Avery is taken 10,000 years into the Land's past, where she meets Berek Halfhand.

== Plot introduction ==
Donaldson returns to the Land for the third series of novels based there. The story re-introduces readers to Linden Avery years after she first encountered Thomas Covenant and was forever changed by the experience.

== Plot summary ==
Linden Avery is determined to save her adopted son, Jeremiah, from the hands of the Despiser. However, before she even begins her search, it appears that Jeremiah and Thomas Covenant have ridden into Revelstone, despite the voice of Thomas Covenant previously telling Linden to "find me". The behaviour and demeanour of her two loved ones arouse suspicion and doubt in Linden.

The Masters (Haruchai) act as hosts whilst the group are in Revelstone. Linden seeks to wash away some of the effects of her adventures and Kevin's Dirt by bathing in Glimmermere, the Earthpower-rich lake above Revelstone. It is there that the ever-conflicted Esmer informs her that she must be the "first to drink of the Earthblood".

Linden returns to Revelstone and accomplishes her immediate goal of cutting off the Demondim's access to a fragment of the Illearth Stone, but shortly afterward she is transported thousands of years into the Land's past by the forms of Thomas Covenant and Jeremiah. Covenant reveals to Linden that he and Jeremiah plan to drink the Earthblood in an attempt to thwart the dire plans of both Lord Foul and Kastenessen, the renegade Elohim. However the trio soon encounter the mysterious and knowledgeable Theomach, a puissant figure who is one of a learned race known as the Insequent. Linden is informed that she must be careful not to upset the Law of Time whilst journeying through this age.

Linden and her companions encounter the Land's ancient hero, Berek Heartthew, the Lord-Fatherer, and his sorely depleted army. The Theomach guides Linden through this meeting, mindful that their presence in this time could have a profound effect on the Law of Time. It is during this meeting that the Theomach reveals the Seven Words of Power to Berek. The Insequent explains Linden's odd appearance and presence by dubbing her the first of the "Unfettered Ones", thus keeping the Law of Time intact. Berek senses her white gold ring, which turns out to be the Land's first encounter with the powerful alloy.

Linden, Covenant and Jeremiah depart Berek's camp, leaving the Theomach behind to fulfill his chosen role as Berek's guide.

Whilst Covenant and Jeremiah attempt to teleport the trio to Melenkurion Skyweir, the source of the Earthblood, Linden is separated from them, and finds herself lost amongst the ancient forest of Garroting Deep. Here she encounters an ancient race, the Viles.

She knows from her time in the Land that the Viles will be corrupted by Lord Foul's Ravers in the centuries to come; eventually they will spawn the Demondim, who in turn will spawn the ur‑viles and Waynhim. During this encounter Linden risks the Law of Time by attempting to dissuade the Viles from their path of self-loathing, informing the Viles of the Raver's part in their corruption. However, in the midst of her revelation, Covenant and Jeremiah contrive to instigate a confrontation between the Viles and Garroting Deep's Forestal, Caerroil Wildwood. During the ensuing battle, Linden is reunited with her two companions, who hasten her towards Melenkurion Skyweir.

The trio enter the caverns of Melenkurion Skyweir. Linden's doubts and misgivings concerning her companions continue to grow, and as the three approach the Earthblood, Linden resolves to partake of the powerful, wish-granting substance before Covenant or Jeremiah.

Once she has drunk of the Earthblood, Linden commands that the truth be shown concerning her companions. Instantly their true forms are revealed: Thomas Covenant's son Roger Covenant has been wearing the guise of his father, whilst Jeremiah is shown to be under the malign influence of a croyel, a parasitic being that feeds upon and takes over the mind of its host. A raging battle takes place in the caverns of Melenkurion Skyweir, during which the ancient mountain is torn asunder. Roger Covenant and the croyel-driven Jeremiah eventually escape, leaving Linden in a state of despair. Half-catatonic, she eventually once again finds herself amongst the trees of Garroting Deep. Here Linden finds the Mahdoubt, another of the Insequent who had previously befriended her in Revelstone during her "proper" time. The Mahdoubt acts as Linden's liaison during a meeting with Caerroil Wildwood, at which point the Forestal bestows Linden with runes for her Staff of Law. After the gift of the runes is given, the Mahdoubt's ability to time-travel allows Linden to return to her proper time, where she is reunited with her friends.

When Linden recovers from her ordeal, her friends tell her that they have communicated with the voice of Thomas Covenant via Anele. They also tell her of a mysterious man who has rid Revelstone of the hoarding Demondim. Linden confronts the man, who turns out to be the Harrow, another of the Insequent. He attempts to wrest Linden's white gold ring and the Staff of Law from her, but the Mahdoubt intervenes and forces the Harrow's forbearance, at the cost of her sanity.

Linden eventually resolves to seek out Loric's krill, a powerful tool which will allow her to channel the power of her white gold ring and the Staff of Law.

Accompanied by her friends and the Humbled (three self-maimed Haruchai), Linden leads a quest to Andelain, the last known resting place of the krill. However the company is besieged when an army of Cavewights and kresh, led by Roger Covenant, attacks them along their way. Esmer materialises, as does the Harrow. The ur-viles which had served Linden during her search for the Staff of Law also join the fray. A mighty battle ensues, during which Linden summons the Sandgorgon Nom for aid. An army of Sandgorgons appears and enters the melee, turning the tide of battle in favour of Linden's company; Roger Covenant retreats, and the Harrow and Esmer vanish. The Sandgorgons, communicating telepathically with Stave of the Haruchai, inform Linden that they consider their service to her to be over and they will no longer obey her summons.

Linden and the company continue to the relatively new forest of Salva Gildenbourne, a wild, jungle-like expanse which surrounds Andelain. Here they first encounter one of the fiery serpent-like skurj; the company struggle to fight it, and Linden finds she is unable to channel sufficient power from her Staff of Law as a consequence of Kevin's Dirt. At the same time Linden is attacked by a crazed Giant. The Giant is quickly subdued by a group of female Giant-warriors, who agree to join Linden's company on their journey to Andelain. Their leader explains to Linden that the actions of the crazed Giant, Longwrath (who is the grandson of Linden's old friend the First of the Search), have been the focus of her group's activities; they have pledged to discover the focus of Longwrath's madness, which seems to be Linden herself.

With Longwrath imprisoned by his fellow Giants, the company encounters Esmer, who warns them that Kastenessen, his grandfather, has sent a pack of skurj to thwart Linden's attempt to recover the krill. Making a desperate stand on the outskirts of Andelain, the company manages to hold off the skurj long enough to enter Andelain, where their attackers seem to be unable to follow.

As Linden and her companions enter Andelain, the Wraiths guide her to the krill's resting place. Linden is besought by both the Harrow and Infelice of the Elohim to turn aside both from her desire for the powerful blade, and her hidden intentions. The Harrow tells Linden that he knows where Lord Foul is keeping Jeremiah, and that he will trade the knowledge for the white gold ring and the Staff of Law.

But Linden will not be turned aside and, as she approaches the krill, her Dead appear to her: Sunder, Hollian, Honninscrave, Cail, the Old Lords - but not Thomas Covenant himself. Yet the Dead refuse to give her counsel. Reaching the apex of her hidden intention, Linden summons the breakers of the Laws of Life and Death: Elena and Caer-Caveral. Through their presence the spirit of Thomas Covenant is invoked. Yet he too refuses to give her counsel; he cannot.

The Humbled attempt to intervene too, but Linden's friends win her freedom to choose by thwarting the Humbled's attempts. Finally Linden grasps the krill, and is exalted by a transcendent surge of power: she is now able to wield both wild magic and Earthpower combined, too much power for any one being without the krill's facility to channel such forces.

With her newly acquired power, Linden enacts her secret desire and hidden intention; she resurrects Thomas Covenant, the only person she feels can help her in her quest to find Jeremiah and defeat the Despiser. But Thomas Covenant appears distraught at her actions: "Oh Linden, what have you done?". Infelice replies that with her use of extreme power, Linden Avery has roused the Worm of the World's End, endangering the Arch of Time itself and all life in the Land.

== Characters in "Fatal Revenant" ==
- Linden Avery
- Jeremiah Jason (Adopted son of Linden Avery)
- Roger Covenant (Son of Thomas Covenant)
- Anele (Son of Sunder and Hollian)
- Stave (a Haruchai; a Master of the Land)
- Liand (Stonedowner)
- Esmer (son of Cail and the Mere-wives)
- Mahrtiir (Manethrall of the Ramen)
- Bhapa (Cord of the Ramen)
- Pahni (Cord of the Ramen)
- Branl (Humbled of the Masters)
- Galt (Humbled of the Masters)
- Clyme (Humbled of the Masters)
- the Mahdoubt (Insequent)
- the Theomach (Insequent)
- the Harrow (Insequent)
- Berek Halfhand (Heartthew, Lord-Fatherer; First of the Old Lords)
- Caerroil Wildwood (Forestal of Garroting Deep)
- Longwrath (a Giant; Swordmainnir name for Exalt Widenedworld)
- Rime Coldspray (Ironfist of the Swordmainnir of the Giants)
- Hyn (Ranyhyn)
- Hynyn (Ranyhyn)
- Infelice (Elohim)
- Thomas Covenant

== Release details ==
- 2007, USA, Putnam Publishing Group (ISBN 0399154469), Pub date 9 October 2007, hardback (first edition)
- 2007, UK, Gollancz (ISBN 0575076003), Pub date 18 October 2007, hardback
