= The Mirror of Her Dreams =

1986 novel by Stephen R. Donaldson

- Author: Stephen R. Donaldson
- Language: English
- Series: Mordant's Need
- Genre: Fantasy
- Published: 1986
- Publisher: Del Rey
- Pages: 642
- ISBN: 9785551661115

The Mirror of Her Dreams is a novel by Stephen R. Donaldson published in 1986.

== Plot summary ==
The Mirror of Her Dreams is a novel in which the setting is a world on which the mirrors are magical, and is the first novel in the Mordant's Need series.

== Reception ==
Dave Langford reviewed The Mirror of Her Dreams for White Dwarf #82, and stated that "It kept me turning the too many pages, though I couldn't believe the Marvel Comics SF megawarrior, or the Feydeauesque scenes in which an ambiguous mage keeps unbuttoning and stroking our heroine's bosoms but never gets any further."

== Reviews ==
- Review by Faren Miller (1986) in Locus, #308 September 1986
- Review by C. W. Sullivan, III (1986) in Fantasy Review, November 1986
- Review by Chris Barker (1986) in Vector 135
- Review by Dave Wolverton (1986) in The Leading Edge Magazine of Science Fiction and Fantasy, #12 Fall 1986
- Review by E. F. Bleiler (1987) in Rod Serling's The Twilight Zone Magazine, February 1987
- Review by Baird Searles (1987) in Isaac Asimov's Science Fiction Magazine, March 1987
