= The Wounded Land =

1980 fantasy novel by Stephen R. Donaldson

- First edition cover
- Author: Stephen R. Donaldson
- Cover artist: Darrell K. Sweet
- Language: English
- Series: The Second Chronicles of Thomas Covenant
- Genre: Fantasy
- Publisher: Del Rey
- Publication date: 1980
- Publication place: United States
- Media type: Print (hardback & paperback)
- Pages: 497
- ISBN: 978-0-345-28647-5
- OCLC: 5353176
- Preceded by: The Power that Preserves
- Followed by: The One Tree

The Wounded Land is a fantasy novel by American writer Stephen R. Donaldson, the first book of the second trilogy of The Chronicles of Thomas Covenant series. It is followed by The One Tree.

The book is dedicated to Lester del Rey with the cryptic appendation: "Lester made me do it." Donaldson has explained on his website that del Rey, his editor-publisher, was the "King of Sequels" and pestered Donaldson incessantly with ideas for a follow-up to the first trilogy, all of which were quite bad, to the extent that Donaldson was driven to conceive workable ideas for both the second and third trilogies.

== Plot summary ==
Ten years have passed since the end of the first Chronicles. After his experiences in the Land, Thomas Covenant has resumed his career as a writer. He is still isolated from society, but he has come to terms with that and with the other mental and physical consequences of his leprosy.

The story begins by presenting us with a new main character; the prologue is told entirely from her point of view, as is much of the main narrative. Linden Avery is a doctor who has moved to Covenant's hometown to take a position at the local hospital. Her traumatic childhood and rigorous medical training have left her emotionally isolated from other people. In her own way, she is as much an outsider in society as Covenant.

The chief of staff at the hospital (who appeared briefly in the first Chronicles) asks her to check up on Covenant. Linden, reluctantly, drives to Covenant's house outside of town. On the way, she sees an elderly man in an ochre robe collapse by the side of the road. Using CPR, she revives him: he makes a number of cryptic pronouncements and walks off, telling her to "be true".

Confused and disturbed by this strange encounter, Linden continues on to Covenant's house. Although he initially brushes her off, she is persistent, and finds that Covenant's estranged wife has returned to him, but that she is under the influence of a cult of worshippers of Lord Foul, who has found a way to exert his influence in Covenant's world.

After Covenant is stabbed in the chest by one of Foul's dupes in the "real" world, he loses consciousness and hears a familiar voice: Lord Foul's. Taunting Covenant that there is "more despair bound up for you than your petty mortal heart can bear", Foul vows that he will have his final revenge on Covenant and the Land.

He awakes to find that both he and Linden have been transported to the Land – to Kevin's Watch, the mountain at the Land's south frontier where he was first summoned by Drool Rockworm. His wound has been healed – somehow Covenant was able to use the "wild magic" of his white gold ring, although he had no conscious control over the process. Descending from the Watch, he also finds that a terrible change has transpired: four thousand years have passed, the Earthpower is gone, or nearly gone, and the people of the Land are out of touch with what remains of it. The Land is afflicted with the Sunbane, a disruption of the physical order which alternately causes rain, desert, pestilence and unnatural fertility to wreak havoc on humans, animals and nature.

The people of the Land have turned to human sacrifice as a means of harnessing the power of the Sunbane: shortly after their arrival, Covenant and Linden are taken prisoner and condemned to be "shed". They escape, but shortly thereafter Covenant is bitten by a monster. Linden, who has become imbued with a form of clairvoyance which allows her to perceive the fundamental nature of people and things in this world (which, with her medical training, she comes to think of as her "health-sense") is able to save Covenant from a life-threatening infection, but the venom from the bite leaves Covenant unable to control the destructive power of the wild magic.

Despite these difficulties, Covenant and Linden Avery join with Sunder and Hollian, a man and woman of the Land, to travel to Revelstone to challenge the corrupt new rulers of the Land, the Clave. On the journey, Covenant enters the Andelainian Hills, a region of the land free of the Sunbane. There he meets with the Forestal Caer-Caveral (formerly Warmark Hile Troy) and the spirits of the long-dead characters of the First Chronicles, who provide him with rather cryptic advice concerning the plight of the Land. Saltheart Foamfollower gives Covenant something more: Vain, a creation of the ur-viles, who accompanies Covenant to Revelstone. (Linden, Sunder, and Hollian have already been captured by the Clave and imprisoned there.) Once there, Covenant agrees to undertake a "soothtell", a ritual of divination by blood. Before Covenant can defend himself the Clave's minions open his veins: this triggers the ritual. Covenant thus discovers that the cause of the current condition of the Land is the destruction of the Staff of Law, which he himself had wrought. Without the strength of the Staff to protect it, the Earthpower itself has been corrupted by Lord Foul; hence, the Sunbane.

Covenant also discovers that the leader of the Clave, the na-Mhoram, is a Raver, one of Lord Foul's immortal, incorporeal servants. As each new na-Mhoram succeeds the last, the Raver takes possession, ensuring that the Clave continues to maintain the Banefire which strengthens the Sunbane. The Banefire is fed by copious quantities of blood: among the victims held by the Clave for future sacrifice are a group of Haruchai, the descendants of the race which formerly served the Land as the Bloodguard. Covenant frees the Haruchai and his friends and retrieves the krill, an ancient and powerful sword forged in the days of the Old Lords, but, due to his power-madness combined with his blood loss, cannot single-handedly battle the combined power of the Clave, and thus is forced to leave Revelstone.

Revelstone is located at the western limit of the Land; beyond are only mountainous wastes. Hence, Covenant and his companions set out east. Their journey is made perilous by the corruption of the Sunbane and the perversity of Sarangrave Flat, a marshy plain on the lower portion of the Land which has been inhabited for millennia by the "lurker", a mysterious and malevolent creature which is aroused by the presence of power. However, the party is preserved by Covenant's wild magic, Linden's health-sense, the Sunbane survival skills of Sunder and Hollian, and the physical prowess of the Haruchai.

As they approach the sea-coast at the eastern edge of the Land, the travellers encounter a party of Giants, of the same race as Foamfollower's long-dead people. Covenant, Avery, Vain, and four of the Haruchai take ship with the Giants in search of a solution to the matter of the Staff of Law, leaving Sunder and Hollian in the Land to try to gather resistance to the Clave in preparation for the final battle.
