= A Dark and Hungry God Arises =

1993 novel by Stephen R. Donaldson

- Author: Stephen R. Donaldson
- Language: English
- Series: The Gap Cycle
- Genre: Science fiction
- Published: 1993 (Bantam Books/Spectra)
- Publication place: United States
- Media type: Print (Hardback & Paperback)
- ISBN: 0-553-56260-6 (USA hardback)
- OCLC: 28542430
- Preceded by: Forbidden Knowledge
- Followed by: Chaos and Order

A Dark and Hungry God Arises (or officially The Gap into Power: A Dark and Hungry God Arises) is a science fiction novel by American writer Stephen R. Donaldson, the third book of The Gap Cycle series.

== Reception ==
A review in Library Journal described A Dark and Hungry God Arises as a "complex and intriguing" novel that "echoes the same grim undertones as its predecessors", with characters that "seethe with inner torment and the darkest motives".

Other reviews:

- Review by John Clute (1993) in Interzone, January 1993
- Review by Don D'Ammassa (1993) in Science Fiction Chronicle, #158 January 1993
- Review by Colin Steele (1993) in SF Commentary, #73/74/75
- Review [Polish] by Wojciech M. Chudziński (2000) in Świat Gier Komputerowych, #95

== Plot summary ==
Angus Thermopyle, now a newly modified cyborg, arrives at the illegal space station Billingate with his handler Milos Taverner. Also present is Morn Hyland’s force-grown son, Davies, whose accelerated growth and implanted memories have made both mother and child uniquely valuable to the Amnion, an alien species experimenting on humans. Morn survives a normally fatal memory-transfer process, likely due to her zone implant, drawing further Amnion interest.

Captain Nick Succorso, angered by Morn’s betrayal and her diversion of Davies away from the Amnion, surrenders Morn to them but steals an anti-mutagen drug that later prevents her transformation. Davies is seized by Billingate’s ruler, The Bill, who demands payment Nick cannot provide, leaving Nick stranded. Angus and Milos encounter Nick and form a fragile alliance when Angus’s hidden programming reveals a directive to rescue Morn.

Angus and Milos infiltrate Billingate and recover Davies, while dissent grows among Nick’s crew, leading them to abandon him. Angus refuses to hand Davies over to Nick, learning that Morn is already in Amnion custody. Milos subsequently reveals himself as an Amnion agent and is forcibly transformed by their emissary, Marc Vestabule.

A joint rescue operation is mounted involving Angus, Nick, and Nick’s former crew. Angus confronts the altered Milos, overcomes his control programming, and rescues Morn. As Billingate descends into chaos, Nick’s ship destroys an Amnion warship, and Billingate’s reactor is sabotaged. Angus’s ship, Trumpet, escapes into the gap amid the station’s destruction.

On Earth, the United Mining Companies Police (UMCP) leadership faces scrutiny from the Governing Council of Earth and Space over Angus’s escape and Morn’s fate. Warden Dios manipulates events to weaken corporate control over the UMCP, secretly pushing for its transfer to government authority. Political assassinations disrupt the process, and Dios ultimately orders that Angus and Milos be eliminated if their situation threatens his plan.
