= The Real Story (novel) =

1991 novel by Stephen R. Donaldson

- Author: Stephen R. Donaldson
- Language: English
- Series: The Gap Cycle
- Genre: Science fiction
- Publisher: Bantam Books/Spectra
- Publication date: 1991
- Publication place: United States
- Media type: Print (hardback & paperback)
- ISBN: 0-553-29509-8 (USA hardback)
- OCLC: 26294050
- Followed by: Forbidden Knowledge

The Real Story (or officially The Gap into Conflict: The Real Story) is a science fiction novel by American writer Stephen R. Donaldson, the first book of The Gap Cycle series.

== Synopsis ==
The patrons of a bar on a mining space station are struck by an unusual scene. Angus Thermopyle, an evil but unsuccessful pirate, walks in with a beautiful woman on his arm. The woman, Morn Hyland, apparently belongs to a rich family and is a great beauty. No one understands why she would associate with Angus, but the dominant theory is that she is somehow his captive. A dashing swashbuckler, Nick Succorso, confronts Angus and somehow rescues the woman. At the end of the first chapter, The narrator describes this as an iconic drama of captor, victim and rescuer, but the narrator tells us that this is not the real story. The more complicated truth unfolds over the rest of this novella.

Morn Hyland, in reality an ensign with the United Mining Companies Police ("UMCP"), is on her first mission aboard the UMCP destroyer Starmaster (which is crewed by members of her extended family). When they arrive at Com-Mine Station, a ship, Bright Beauty, piloted by the pirate Angus Thermopyle, flees, and Starmaster follows.

In his haste, Angus left the station without picking up some essential supplies including air-scrubbers. Out of desperation Angus incinerates a small mining settlement in hopes of stealing their supplies. Starmaster witnesses this slaughter and attempts combat, but is almost destroyed by a massive internal explosion. Morn suffers from gap-sickness, a mental disorder that inflicts itself on a small portion of people who travel through the Gap. Symptoms of gap-sickness vary wildly; in Morn, it manifests itself as an uncontrollable urge to engage self-destruct, and is triggered by exposure to 'heavy g'. Morn, left alone on the auxiliary bridge when Starmaster engaged Angus' ship, experienced gap-sickness for the first time, and attempted to destroy the Starmaster.

Angus boards the wreck hoping to salvage some air scrubbers, murders Morn's father (who had survived Morn's attempted self-destruct) and kidnaps Morn. Seeking both control of her gap-sickness, and Morn herself, Angus places a zone implant - a remotely controlled electrode - onto her brain, which allows Angus to control Morn's every feeling and action. By giving Morn an unauthorized zone implant, Angus has committed a capital crime, and will be executed if he is caught.

On the way back to Com-Mine, Angus activates Morn's zone implant, allowing him to repeatedly rape and abuse her. Unwittingly, he also starts to form an emotional attachment to her.

Back at the station, Morn makes contact with another pirate - Nick Succorso, captain and owner of the ship Captain's Fancy, who she sees as a potential rescuer. She aids Nick in framing Angus for stealing station supplies, and Angus is arrested. Morn leaves the station aboard Succorso's ship, depriving the authorities of the evidence they would need to execute Angus. His life is therefore spared, Morn effectively becoming his rescuer.

== Background ==
Donaldson explains one of the intents in writing this first book, which was originally to be only a stand-alone novella, was to present the three classic archetypes of victim, villain & hero and then have them exchange roles. Here, we start with Morn as the damsel, Angus as villain and Nick as the hero. Then as the story develops over the course of the series, Morn is elevated to hero, Nick becomes the villain and Angus becomes a victim of sorts.
