= This Day All Gods Die =

1996 novel by Stephen R. Donaldson

- Author: Stephen R. Donaldson
- Language: English
- Series: The Gap Cycle
- Genre: Science fiction
- Publisher: Bantam Books/Spectra
- Publication date: 1996
- Publication place: United States
- Media type: Print (hardback and paperback)
- ISBN: 0-553-57328-4 (US hardback)
- OCLC: 36516362
- Preceded by: Chaos and Order

This Day All Gods Die, officially The Gap into Ruin: This Day All Gods Die, is a 1996 science fiction novel by the American writer Stephen R. Donaldson, being the final book of The Gap Cycle.

== Plot ==
As the crippled starship Trumpet drifts in space, its drives sabotaged from within by a crewman tainted with an alien mutagen, a deadly game is being played out on a satellite near Earth in the headquarters of the UMC Police. In the wake of a suicide attack in the chambers of the Governing Council for Earth and Space, UMCP Director Warden Dios is preparing to expose the secret machinations of the Dragon, the corrupt head of the United Mining Companies. But Dios's own dangerous actions are about to come to light and may precipitate all-out war with the Amnion, leaving Dios – and all humanity – to pay a terrible price for what could be termed treason.

Though dead in space, Trumpet broadcasts to any ship in range the formula of the mutagen's antidote – a drug the UMC has suppressed for its own sinister purposes. A small band of battered survivors, these fugitives hold the key to Earth's future: Morn Hyland, a former UMCP cop whose obsession with the Amnion has grown so fierce she is becoming something even her son doesn't recognize; Angus Thermopyle, cyborg tool of the UMCP, released from his cybernetic enslavement and now testing the boundaries of his new freedom; Ciro Vasaczk, tormented by the damage done him by the Amnion mutagen – and by the damage he himself has done Trumpet while in thrall to the drug.

Their escape from the Calm Horizons will prove to be only a temporary triumph if the alien combat craft survives its battle with the UMCP ship Punisher and returns to the Amnion with the antidote's formula – and the key to the destruction of all human life. Morn Hyland can see just one way out of their situation. As Min Donner and Punisher close in on the disabled Trumpet to arrest the fugitives, Morn prepares for a desperate gamble. To commandeer the police craft by any means necessary... and take it back to Earth.

As Dios in Earth's orbit and Morn in deep space each make dire, far-reaching decisions, the Amnion act with swift fury, and suddenly Earth stands threatened with fiery destruction.

== Publication ==
This Day All Gods Die was the fifth and final novel in the author Stephen R. Donaldson's series The Gap Cycle. It was published on April 15, 1996, by Bantam Books/Spectra.

== Reception ==
The novel received positive reviews and was described by Publishers Weekly as "a crowd-pleasing story told on a grand scale, SF adventure with a genuinely galactic feel".
