= The Illearth War =

1977 novel by Stephen R. Donaldson

- Cover of The Illearth War
- Author: Stephen R. Donaldson
- Cover artist: S. C. Wyeth
- Language: English
- Series: The Chronicles of Thomas Covenant
- Genre: Fantasy
- Publisher: Holt, Rinehart and Winston
- Publication date: 1977
- Publication place: United States
- Media type: Print (hardback and paperback)
- Pages: 527
- ISBN: 0-8050-1271-0 (USA hardback)
- OCLC: 23591011
- Preceded by: Lord Foul's Bane
- Followed by: The Power that Preserves

The Illearth War is a fantasy novel by American writer Stephen R. Donaldson, the second book of the first trilogy of The Chronicles of Thomas Covenant series. It is followed by The Power that Preserves.

== Plot summary ==
Several weeks after returning to his world from The Land, the leper Thomas Covenant is taking a phone call from his ex-wife Joan when he falls and hits his head, waking to find himself back in the Land, in the chamber of the Council of Lords of Revelstone.

Angered by the fact that he has been transported away from "reality", Covenant nevertheless believes he is once again experiencing a dream or delusion due to his head injury. His hypothesis is supported by the fact that the Land has seen the passing of forty years compared to the few weeks that have passed in his own world: the High Lord of the Council is Elena. Much later he learns that she is his daughter, born of his rape of Lena. Due to the trauma, Lena has disassociated from life and reverted to a childlike mentality, fully dependent on her family. Elena is now Covenant's summoner and shows no ill will towards her biological father. She and Covenant become close friends.

Elena explains that the evil Lord Foul has assembled a massive army, with which he now threatens the people of The Land. For forty years, the Lords have dedicated themselves to the study of Kevin's Lore, training new students at the school at the tree city of Revelwood. Only Mhorham remains from Lords of the council during the quest for the Staff of Law, but seven new Lords have taken their seats, having mastered both the magical and martial arts. The horse-tending Ramen have been enlisted to patrol the frontier near Foul's dominions. The Warward, the army of Revelstone, is full of battle-ready volunteers and is led by Hile Troy, who came to the Land from Covenant's world. An attempt was even made to attack Lord Foul directly, via a commando raid on his lair at the Land's eastern edge; although the raid, led by Lord Mhoram, failed, valuable knowledge was gained about Foul's forces.

The commander of Foul's army is one of three brothers of the race of Giants, a people previously thought incorruptible. With the aid of the powerful Illearth Stone, the Ravers, Foul's non-corporeal servants, have possessed the three brothers, now renamed Kinslaughterer, Fleshharrower, and Satansfist. In shame and despair, the other Giants offer no resistance as Kinslaughterer murders them all in their home city. Thus, the Lords have lost their strongest and bravest allies in the fight against evil.

Nevertheless, the Lords resolve to meet the enemy on the battlefield. Hile Troy is a genius in military tactics who developed a mystical form of sight when hurtloam, a magical mud with miraculous curative properties, was used to try and "heal" his lack of eyes. (The hurtloam used to heal Covenant's head injury also has the effect of "curing" his leprosy.) While Troy leads the army to confront Fleshharrower's attacking force, Elena and Covenant go in search of the Seventh Ward, a repository of ancient magical power which Elena believes will ensure victory.

Covenant, Elena and their two Bloodguard protectors journey through the remote mountain region on the western frontier of the Land to the hiding place of the Ward. Elena gains the power; foolishly, she uses it to summon the long-dead High Lord Kevin from his grave, and send him against Lord Foul. This act breaks the Law of Death, the barrier preventing the souls of the dead from interfering in the world of the living. Kevin's spirit is easily defeated and then enslaved by Foul wielding the Illearth Stone, and commanded to destroy Elena. The two High Lords engage in a battle of magic, in which Elena and her Bloodguard are defeated and killed, and the Staff of Law lost again. Covenant is able to save himself and his Bloodguard by using the power of his white gold ring, again without understanding how.

Meanwhile, Hile Troy has been forced into a desperate retreat by the superior force of the Raver's army to the edge of a dangerous, forbidding forest known as Garroting Deep. In desperation, he and Lord Mhoram beg the aid of Caerroil Wildwood, an immortal Forestal who is charged with protecting the ancient forests of the Land from the Ravers. Wildwood awakens the forest, totally destroying Foul's army, and personally garrotes Fleshharrower. The victory is a Pyrrhic one, however: the Lords' army is nearly obliterated, three Lords besides Elena have been killed, and Hile Troy has sacrificed himself as the price for the Forestal's aid, becoming Wildwood's immortal apprentice.

The war thus ends in a draw, and with the death of High Lord Elena his summoner, Covenant once again returns to his own world. His ex-wife has long since hung up the phone, and he is a leper once more.
