= Daughter of Regals =

1984 novella by Stephen R. Donaldson

- Cover of the first edition
- Author: Stephen R. Donaldson
- Illustrator: David Cherry
- Language: English
- Genre: Fantasy
- Publisher: Donald M. Grant, Publisher, Inc.
- Publication date: 1984
- Publication place: United States
- Media type: Print (Hardback)
- Pages: 124 pp
- ISBN: 0-937986-63-1
- OCLC: 11292071

Daughter of Regals is a fantasy novella by Stephen R. Donaldson.

== Plot summary ==
It tells of a young woman called Chrysalis, the nominal ruler of three kingdoms who is about to come of age. To claim her throne, Chrysalis must exhibit the magical abilities of her ancestors the Regals - who combined the attributes of human men and mythical creatures - or else her dominions will collapse into civil war. While the kings of the individual kingdoms plot against her, Chrysalis struggles to release the magic inherent within her and claim her inheritance.

== Publication history ==
It was published in a stand-alone volume in 1984 by Donald M. Grant, Publisher, Inc. in an edition of 1,075 copies. All copies were signed by the author and artist. The novella first appeared in Donaldson's collection Daughter of Regals and Other Tales published earlier in 1984.

== Reception ==
Dave Langford reviewed Daughter of Regals for White Dwarf #55, and stated that "It's a patchy collection, whose strong points are the first story [...] and the last, 'Ser Visal's Tale', more gory melodrama with witches and an Inquisition, related with ghoulish relish. Donaldson's SF is less successful."

== Reviews ==
- Review by Faren Miller (1984) in Locus, #278 March 1984
- Review by Robert J. Ewald (1984) in Fantasy Review, October 1984
