= The Power that Preserves =

1979 novel by Stephen R. Donaldson

- First edition cover
- Author: Stephen R. Donaldson
- Cover artist: S. C. Wyeth
- Language: English
- Series: The Chronicles of Thomas Covenant
- Genre: Fantasy
- Publisher: Holt, Rinehart and Winston
- Publication date: 1979
- Publication place: United States
- Media type: Print (Hardback & Paperback)
- Pages: 489
- ISBN: 0-8050-1270-2 (USA hardback)
- OCLC: 23602890
- Preceded by: The Illearth War
- Followed by: The Wounded Land

The Power that Preserves is a fantasy novel by American writer Stephen R. Donaldson, the final book of the first trilogy of The Chronicles of Thomas Covenant series. It is followed by The Wounded Land, which begins the second trilogy.

== Plot summary ==
Back in his own "real" world, Thomas Covenant is devastated by the loss of Elena, though he still maintains to himself that his experience in the Land was all just a dream. Tormented by this unanswerable paradox, he neglects his physical condition; he stops taking his medications and fails to treat his head wound, allowing his dormant leprosy to once again become active.

Wandering in the woods outside of his home town, he comes upon a lost little girl suffering from a rattlesnake bite. At this point he is once again summoned to the Land, this time by the desperate High Lord Mhoram, who is in need of aid. Covenant finds that seven years have gone by since the Illearth War, and Lord Foul is preparing for his final assault on the people of the Land. Foul has enslaved the tormented spirit of former High Lord Elena, who now wields the Staff of Law in the service of evil. The Lords have lost their most loyal defenders, the ageless Bloodguard, and the Land has been cast into a perpetual winter. Furthermore, Lord Foul has rebuilt his army, which, under the command of the third Giant-Raver Satansfist, now besieges the Lords' mountain-fortress of Revelstone. As a last resort, the Lords have decided to call upon Covenant, in the hope that he will be able to use the wild magic of his white gold ring to repel the siege and save the Land from total destruction.

Covenant, however, demands that Mhoram release the summons in order to allow him to save the girl's life in the "real" world. Mhoram assents. Covenant does manage to save the girl, but at the cost of being poisoned by the rattlesnake venom he has sucked out of her. In this state and with the knowledge that the girl is safe, he accepts another summoning.

Covenant finds himself once again at Kevin's Watch, the place to which Lord Foul transported him at the time of his first summoning by Drool Rockworm. This time he has been brought to the Land by the joint efforts of Triock, jilted lover of Lena (whom Covenant raped on his first trip to the Land resulting in the birth of Elena) and the Giant Saltheart Foamfollower, his boon companion from the quest for the Staff of Law and one of the last two surviving Giants. Descending from the mountain and travelling east with Triock and Foamfollower in search of Lord Foul's demesne, Covenant is horrified to witness the depredations caused by Foul and his servants. South of the Plains of Ra, Covenant finds that his old bodyguard Bannor has joined with the Ramen in an attempt to protect the Ranyhyn, the intelligent, free horses who formerly served the Bloodguard as mounts. Covenant releases the Ranyhyn from the promise they made allowing the Ramen to lead them south to safety; Bannor, now aged as he is no longer sustained by the power of his Vow, accompanies him on his journey east. Kidnapped by Ravers, Covenant confronts Elena and uses the power of his white gold ring to dismiss her ghost, although this results in the destruction of the Staff of Law. Bannor declines to follow Covenant further, although he accepts the metal heels of the Staff for safekeeping and eventual return to the Lords. Meanwhile Lord Mhoram, after a protracted battle, can break the siege of Revelstone and kill Satansfist.

Afterwards, Covenant and Foamfollower journey to Ridjeck Thome, the very heart of Lord Foul's dominion, where they succeed in defeating Foul; this act also repairs much of the havoc caused by Elena's breaking of the Law of Death. Covenant, who has finally gained full comprehension of and control over the power of the wild magic, uses it to destroy the Illearth Stone: in the final cataclysm Foamfollower is killed and so, seemingly, is Covenant.

However, his consciousness remains, and while in a state somewhere between being and non-existence, he is spoken to in the darkness by the voice of the old beggar from the beginning of the first book, who is in fact the Creator of the Land. The Creator thanks Covenant for saving his creation and asks him what reward he might accept. Excitedly, Covenant asks the Creator to save Foamfollower, but the Creator regretfully tells Covenant "in a tone of ineffable rue" that even he cannot undo something that has already occurred: otherwise the Arch of Time, the fundamental structure underlying the Land's universe, will be destroyed. The Creator explains that this restriction, in fact, is what prevented him from dealing with Foul directly: he had to act through a proxy, Covenant, and even after causing Covenant to be transported to the Land, the Creator did not interfere with Covenant's freedom of will in any way. The decision to "save or damn" the Land was Covenant's own.

The Creator then tells Covenant that he has a choice: either he can remain in the Land in full health, or he can be returned to life in his own world, where he otherwise would have died from an allergic reaction to the anti-venom treatment applied to his unconscious body. Covenant, still unwilling to fully accept the Land, chooses the latter and awakes in his hospital bed, weakened from his physical trauma, still afflicted with his disease. However, he is happy to be alive, and secure in the knowledge that he had not failed the Land.
