= Lord Foul's Bane =

1977 fantasy novel by Stephen R. Donaldson

- First edition
- Author: Stephen R. Donaldson
- Cover artist: Janice C. Tate
- Language: English
- Series: The Chronicles of Thomas Covenant
- Genre: Fantasy
- Publisher: Nelson Doubleday
- Publication date: 1977
- Publication place: United States
- Media type: Print (Hardback & Paperback)
- Pages: 480
- ISBN: 0-8050-1272-9 (USA hardback)
- OCLC: 33451041
- Followed by: The Illearth War

Lord Foul's Bane is a 1977 fantasy novel by American writer Stephen R. Donaldson, the first book of the first trilogy of The Chronicles of Thomas Covenant series. It is followed by The Illearth War.

== Plot summary ==
Thomas Covenant is a young author whose world is turned upside-down when he is diagnosed with leprosy. After six months' treatment, he returns home to find himself divorced by his wife Joan and outcast from his community. On a rare trip into town, he is accosted by a beggar. Disturbed by the encounter, Covenant stumbles into the path of an oncoming police car and is rendered unconscious.

He wakes to find himself in "the Land", a classic fantasy world, where he meets the evil Cavewight Drool Rockworm and Lord Foul the Despiser. Foul prophesies that he will destroy the Land within 49 years; however, if Drool is not stopped, this doom will come to pass much sooner. He tells Covenant to deliver this information to the rulers of the Land, the Lords who study ancient lore and have sworn the "Oath of Peace" at the Capitol city.

Covenant meets a girl named Lena, who uses a special mud called hurtloam to heal the injuries from his fall and cure his leprosy. Covenant's loss of two fingers on his right hand makes Lena think he is the reincarnation of ancient hero Berek Halfhand. Believing himself to be in the grip of a dangerous delusion, and overwhelmed by his newfound sense of health and vitality, he rapes Lena.

Covenant delivers the message of Lord Foul to the Lords. Despite the obvious danger, the Lords decide to make an effort to wrest the powerful Staff of Law from Drool's evil grasp. Rather than waging an all-out war, the Council sends four Lords and a band of 40 warriors to attempt to infiltrate Drool's lair at Mount Thunder.

Led by High Lord Prothall, the Lords' party sets out eastward. Covenant joins them in the hope that the recovery of the Staff of Law will somehow assist in his return to his "real" world. In the end, at the cost of the deaths of many of their companions, the Lords succeed in penetrating Mount Thunder and seizing the Staff, temporarily securing peace for the Land. Covenant destroys Drool Rockworm and saves the surviving members of the party by using the wild magic of his ring to summon the Fire-Lions, creatures of living lava which issue from the peak of Mount Thunder, although he does not fully control or even understand his power.

After the death of Drool, who had used the Staff of Law to summon Covenant to the Land, Covenant feels his physical body fading away, loses consciousness, and wakes up in his own world, a leper once more.

== Critical response ==
The Ultimate Encyclopedia of Fantasy described Lord Foul's Bane as a "more original and interesting work" than its contemporary, The Sword of Shannara by Terry Brooks.
