= Amnion (Gap Cycle) =

Fictional alien species

The Amnion (singular, Amnioni) are a fictional alien species in Stephen R. Donaldson's The Gap Cycle. They are shown to be the only alien race humanity has made contact with and play a major role in the series from Forbidden Knowledge onwards.

Amnion are fundamentally different from any Earth creature - particularly humankind - in their mental and emotional structure. Physically they are humanoid: the Amnioni with whom first contact is made is described in Forbidden Knowledge as "a humanoid sea-anemone with too many arms." Amnion are however severely different from each other in physical appearance, with differing numbers of limbs, eyes, and other organs, as well as varying vastly in size and shape. This physical individuality contrasts with their mental identicality - their mentality can be likened to that of an insect hive. They are analogous to the Borg in the Star Trek universe, both in their collective intelligence (or "mind union") and in their aim to conquer through assimilation (turning humans into members of their own species).

Despite their fundamental opposition and Cold War-type conflict with humanity, they are not portrayed as the main antagonists in The Gap Cycle. Rather they serve as a driving force for the conflict between the human characters.

== First Contact ==
Forbidden Knowledge explains that in the universe of the Gap Cycle, there is some argument over when first contact can be said to have started. Captain Sixten Vertigus, aboard the Deep Star was the first human to meet an actual Amnioni aboard the Amnion 'defensive' Solidarity: this is where the above description of an Amnioni comes from.

Vertigus's instructions were to "establish proximity with any alien vessel or base" and then broadcast the contents of a tape prepared specially for the occasion. They would record any reply that they were able to for as long as possible, then to "escape into the gap in a way that would confuse pursuit". This seemingly-paranoid set of instructions was due to the unwillingness of Holt Fasner to reveal too much to any alien race "whose intentions were unguessable". Vertigus however was willing to disobey these orders directly: something of an idealist, he resolved to travel to the Amnion ship and deliver the tape in person, mostly out of a desire to lay eyes on at least one Amnioni, but also in the hope of kick-starting diplomatic relations between the two races. The Amnion in return gave him a canister containing mutagenic material - the same sort of material that had led Vertigus there in the first place.

This is where the debate over 'first contact' started from: the Amnion's existence had already been known, and aside from matters of appearance, Captain Vertigus learnt nothing new about the race. The Amnion had been discovered when the ship Far Star encountered a satellite of alien origin, containing mutagens, in a far extrasolar system. The return of Far Star to Earth is touted as having "enough scientific, economic, and cultural impact to qualify as 'first contact'."

== Mutagens ==
The main threat of the Amnion is their mutagenic technology. Mutagens have the ability to rewrite the DNA of a non-Amnioni so it becomes at least partially Amnion. This ability was first discovered by humans during tests on the material discovered in the Amnion satellite - Donaldson remarks that "Earth science being what it was... the tests eventually included feeding a bit of the substance to a rat." This has a drastic effect on the rat, which now resembles "a mobile clump of seaweed". Dissection reveals a fundamental genetic change - basic life processes remain intact, but protein and DNA structure are radically different. The new mutants can breed with each other (though not with mutated members of other species) and, most disturbingly, display a significantly increased level of intelligence. When the mutagen was tested on a human being, she only survived for a day and a half - autopsies cite the only possible cause of death as fright. Later in the series the trauma of mutation into an Amnioni is mentioned - this is probably what killed her. Before her death she wrote down galactic co-ordinates, which is where the Deep Star found the Solidarity. An anti-mutagen drug is developed by Intertech, but one of the many storylines in the series is the suppression of the drug and all research relating to it by the United Mining Companies Police, and why this was done.

== Actions in the series ==
The Amnion are not introduced until Forbidden Knowledge, but play an important part in all four books following.

Note: This list is not intended to be a definitive plot summary, more an overview of the parts the Amnion play, and it is assumed that the article on The Gap Cycle has already been read.

=== Forbidden Knowledge ===
Morn Hyland is taken to Enablement Station to have her child force-grown by the Amnion. This is the only possibility, as she has convinced Nick Succorso that the child is his son. The Amnion expose Morn's deceptions, by informing Nick both that Morn's son is not Nick's son, and that Morn has a zone implant - therefore revealing that her love for him is not real.

The Amnion wish to study the effects of the zone implant on Morn's son (Davies) and demand that Nick return him to them, but Morn sabotages the escape pod that Davies is in, sending it towards the illegal shipyard of Billingate.

The Amnion also attempt to study Nick's blood, as he was injected with mutagens last time he visited Enablement, but showed immunity - this is because he has supplies of the immunity drug, given to him by the UMC Police.

The Amnion repair the gap drive of Captain's Fancy, but sabotage it to test components that they, themselves, are developing that will allow their war ships to travel at near-light space-normal speeds.

=== A Dark and Hungry God Arises ===
The 'Bill' (the mayor of Billingate, and an illegal) recaptures Davies. Morn is traded to the Amnion, but survives being injected by their mutagens as she has stolen some of Nick's immunity drug.

Milos Taverner, who has come to Billingate with Angus Thermopyle, is injected with mutagens and becomes an Amnioni. Angus, with the help of various members of Nick's crew and Nick himself, recapture Morn - Taverner, as an Amnioni, attempts to use his priority-codes to control Angus, but new programming protects him. Angus sabotages the fusion reactors and destroys Billingate - meanwhile, one Amnion defensive, Tranquil Hegemony, is rammed and destroyed by Captain's Fancy, and the second, Calm Horizons, pursues the fleeing Gap-scout Trumpet.

=== Chaos and Order ===
Calm Horizons, with the aid of the pirate ship Soar, pursues Trumpet. It is revealed that Soar's captain, Sorus Chantelaine, is controlled by the Amnion through use of delayed-action mutagens. The cabin boy aboard Trumpet, Ciro Vasaczk, is captured by Sorus and blackmailed into sabotaging the drive of Trumpet using the same mutagens. Calm Horizons attempts to destroy Trumpet to prevent the broadcasting of the anti-mutagen drug formula, but is engaged by the UMCP ship Punisher and, due to the turning of Soar against Calm Horizons, is unable to destroy either Punisher or Trumpet, though Soar is destroyed. The book ends with Calm Horizons speeding for Earth.

=== This Day All Gods Die ===
Calm Horizons arrives in Earth orbit and threatens to use its super-light proton cannon to destroy the Governing Council for Earth and Space. Warden Dios, head of the UMCP, agrees to go aboard Calm Horizons and negotiate with Marc Vestabule. He reluctantly agrees to their demands, hoping that the crew of Trumpet, who have taken command of Punisher, can save him. Dios is injected with delayed-action mutagens but is rescued by Davies Hyland, Angus Thermopyle and Vector Shaheed, though Vector dies in the attempt. They escape from Calm Horizons, Angus having sabotaged the super-light proton cannon by filling it with hull sealant, so it explodes when the ship attempts to fire. Calm Horizons flees, but is destroyed by Ciro Vasaczk using a singularity grenade, though he dies doing so.

== Notable Amnion ==
The Amnion do not appear to have individuals in the human sense of the word, or if so, they do not show it. The only Amnion given names are those who were previously human, and have been mutated.

- Marc Vestabule - Originally sold to the Amnion by Angus Thermopyle before the latter was made into a cyborg. He undertakes the majority of the diplomatic negotiations with humans in the series - it is stated that due to once being human, he can understand humankind better than most Amnion, who seem to struggle with concepts such as betrayal, lying, and individual survival instinct. It is suggested that the major instinct of the Amnion is the expansion and propagation of the Amnion race.
- Milos Taverner - Originally an agent of Com-Mine Security, and then blackmailed by the UMCP into accompanying Angus to Billingate. He attempts to sell information to the Amnion, but is mutated by them. He then tries to take control of Angus, later escaping the destruction of Billingate onboard Soar. Sorus Chatelaine kills him before attacking Calm Horizons.

Also of note are the three Amnion ships mentioned:

- Calm Horizons - one of two defensives pursuing Captain's Fancy. Commits an act of war by crossing into human space. Attempts to destroy the GCES but is sabotaged and later destroyed.
- Tranquil Hegemony - the second defensive pursuing Captain's Fancy. Attempts to blast Morn Hyland and her rescuers on the surface of Thanatos Minor, where Billingate is located. Rammed by Captain's Fancy to prevent her doing so.
- Solidarity - the ship that Captain Sixten Vertigus (arguably) makes first contact with.
