= The One Tree =

1982 novel by Stephen R. Donaldson

- First edition cover
- Author: Stephen R. Donaldson
- Cover artist: Darrell K. Sweet
- Language: English
- Series: The Second Chronicles of Thomas Covenant
- Genre: Fantasy
- Publisher: Del Rey
- Publication date: 1982
- Publication place: United States
- Media type: Print (Hardback & Paperback)
- Pages: 496
- ISBN: 978-0-345-29898-0
- Preceded by: The Wounded Land
- Followed by: White Gold Wielder

The One Tree is a fantasy novel by American writer Stephen R. Donaldson, the second book of the second trilogy of The Chronicles of Thomas Covenant series. It is followed by White Gold Wielder. This book differs from the others in the First and Second Chronicles, in that the story takes place outside of the Land, although still in the same world.

== Plot summary ==
Following the vision he received from the Clave at Revelstone, Thomas Covenant seeks to fix the corruption of the Land after the Staff of Law's destruction. He is accompanied on his quest by Linden Avery, a physician from his own "real" world, and four Haruchai bodyguards. They use a ship crewed by the Giants, a seafaring people. The journey is made more difficult by Covenant's bouts of madness from the venomous bite of a Sunbane-spawned monster. Linden, who in this world is endowed with an ability to sense health of animals and plants, is frustrated by her inability to help him.

From the Land, the Giant-ship sails to the home of the Elohim that Linden perceives are an embodiment of Earthpower, the source of magic. Despite their seeming omnipotence, the Elohim are bound by a strange code of behavior and provide no direct help, other than helping Covenant unlock the location of the One Tree, from which the Staff of Law was fashioned. In the course of rendering this service, the Elohim deliberately cause Covenant to go into a catatonic state; "don't touch me" is all he can say.

The travelers find that one of the Elohim, named Findail, has joined them aboard the Giants' ship for his own purposes. The questors are not pleased but are powerless to make him leave. After suffering severe damage in a storm, in which Findail refuses to help, the ship arrives at the port city of the Bhrathair, a militaristic – but also wealthy and civilized – people living at the edge of a great desert. The Bhrathair are ruled by the gaddhi, Rant Absolain, who rather coldly receives the quest's shore party, and it is discovered that the true ruler is the gaddhi's chief adviser, a wizard named Kasreyn of the Gyre. Kasreyn initially appears to be kindly disposed to the quest but is revealed to have ulterior motives.

The ship is repaired, but the ill will between the travelers and the gaddhi breaks out into overt violence. One of the Haruchai guards is forced to fight a Sandgorgon, a monster of immense power, and is killed. The feud was the result of a manipulative ploy by Kasreyn. The wizard abducts Covenant, who is still in a catatonic state, and attempts to use his powers to compel Covenant to give up his ring. The remainder of the shore party is imprisoned in the dungeon. Linden reluctantly uses her power to invade Covenant's consciousness, breaks his catatonia, and thwarts Kasreyn's efforts to seize the ring by making Covenant summon the Sandgorgon that had previously killed the Haruchai. Covenant and the Haruchai fight their way to Kasreyn's laboratory but discover that Kasreyn has a parasitic being living on his back that provides him with extended longevity and immunity to physical attack. Findail kills both the parasite and Kasreyn, setting off a palace coup that leaves the port in a state of chaos.

After narrowly escaping, the ship arrives at the One Tree's island location. Brinn, Covenant's Haruchai bodyguard, sacrifices himself in a duel with the Tree's Guardian ak-Haru Kenaustin Ardenol. He is regenerated as the new Guardian and leads the party to the Tree itself. Cable Seadreamer, the mute giant, stops Covenant from taking a piece of the Tree. When Seadreamer makes the attempt himself, he is killed: he has disturbed the Worm of the World's End, which sleeps beneath the Tree and whose "aura" serves as a defense mechanism. This aura triggers Covenant's power to an astronomical degree. As Covenant attempts to overwhelm the Worm with his power, Findail warns Linden that the Arch of Time cannot contain the struggle between the two powers and that the world will be destroyed if it continues.

Linden, much against her will, mentally reaches out to Covenant. Sharing his thoughts, she sees him open a passage back to the "real" world and attempt to return her to it. She senses, however, that in the "real" world Covenant's body is very weak and will die if he does not himself return. Unwilling to do this, Covenant draws Linden back through the rift between the worlds. With her help, he is able to contain his power, but at the price of the Isle of the One Tree sinking beneath the ocean as the earth heaves with the movements of the Worm of the World's End settling back from disturbance into slumber. Thus, the quest ends in failure.

== Reception ==
John T. Sapienza, Jr. reviewed The One Tree for Different Worlds magazine and stated that "The One Tree is the quest for the material for the staff, but it is also a quest for self-control and self-realization, in both Covenant and Avery. Their depth of characterization and development distinguishes Donaldson's writing from fantasy writers of lesser skill as much as his mythmaking. But, for our purposes as gamers, the features of greater interest are the Land and other territories, and their races and cultures, and The One Tree shows us new elements of each."

== Reviews ==
- Review by Faren Miller (1982) in Locus, #254 March 1982
- Review by Patricia Hernlund (1982) in Science Fiction & Fantasy Book Review, #4, May 1982
- Review by Joseph Nicholas (1982) in Vector 109
- Review by Roger C. Schlobin (1982) in Fantasy Newsletter, #51 September 1982
- Review by Ian Watson (1982) in Foundation, #26 October 1982
- Review by Frank Catalano (1983) in Amazing Science Fiction, January 1983
- Review by Mo Holkar and Ivan Towlson and Neal Tringham [as by M. H. Zool] (1989) in Bloomsbury Good Reading Guide to Science Fiction and Fantasy
- Review [Dutch] by Jaap Boekestein (2004) in Holland-SF 2004, #5
