= The Runes of the Earth =

2004 novel by Stephen R. Donaldson

- Cover to the First UK Edition
- Author: Stephen R. Donaldson
- Language: English
- Series: The Last Chronicles of Thomas Covenant
- Genre: Fantasy
- Published: 14 October 2004 Putnam Publishing (USA); 21 October 2004 Gollancz (UK)
- Publication place: United States
- Media type: Print (Hardback & Paperback) & Audio CD
- Pages: 608 (UK hardback edition) & 532 (USA hardback edition)
- ISBN: 0-575-07598-8 (hardback edition) & ISBN 0-399-15232-6 (USA hardback edition)
- OCLC: 59265669
- Preceded by: White Gold Wielder
- Followed by: Fatal Revenant

The Runes of the Earth is a fantasy novel by American writer Stephen R. Donaldson, the first book of The Last Chronicles of Thomas Covenant series. It was first published in 2004.

== Plot introduction ==
Donaldson returns to the Land for the third series of novels based there. We are re-introduced to Linden Avery years after she first encountered Thomas Covenant and was forever changed by the experience. We journey once more to the familiar fantasy world where everything is again under threat.

== Plot summary ==
Linden Avery is now in charge of a clinic for the mentally ill and is responsible, among other things, for caring for Joan Covenant. Roger, son of Thomas and Joan, comes to visit for the first time in many years and seeks to take Joan out of care, claiming that he wants to assume responsibility for the task himself. Roger also demands from Linden his late father's white gold wedding ring, which she refuses to relinquish. Linden remains suspicious of his intentions, but she is not able to prevent his forceful removal of Joan at gunpoint, and his abduction of Linden's adopted son, Jeremiah. Casualties mount as Joan is taken and – whilst attempting to intervene – Linden, Joan, Roger, and Jeremiah are transported to the Land, where they must adjust to its new demands.

On return to the Land, she discovers that the people have no knowledge of the Earthpower she had so cherished before; this knowledge is denied them by the blight on the land known as Kevin's Dirt. This ancient lore is also kept from them by the Haruchai, who have now taken upon themselves total responsibility for the Land's defense, discouraging the learning of Law and any knowledge of Earthpower or the Land's history. They have become the "Masters” of the Land. Also, the Land has been beset by caesures (or "Falls") which are strange disruptions created from wild magic by Joan in her madness.

Linden takes under her protection an enigmatic character called Anele, who turns out to have been the son of two people that Linden had known centuries before, which appears logically impossible. He is full of Earthpower, as a result of a pregnant Hollian (from the second chronicles) being brought back to life by Earthpower. Linden also finds an ally in a Stonedownor, Liand, who quickly comes to trust Linden implicitly when she introduces him to his past and the Land, showing him an expression of Earthpower beyond all his previous experience. The Masters threaten Anele (and indirectly, Linden) as she seeks to find ways of locating and rescuing her son, a quest she keeps to herself. When a strange storm attacks Liand's village, Mithil Stonedown, he and Linden and Anele take the opportunity to escape the Masters.

Their escape is compromised when Stave, another Master, catches up with them. Initially they believe he has come to recapture them, but he actually brings timely warning of a huge pack of wolves (kresh) that is pursuing them. They are rescued by a company of Ramen, the traditional servants of the Ranyhyn horses, who seem to have made an odd alliance with the ur‑viles. They are then led to the Verge of Wandering – a valley the Ramen come to every couple of generations.

Here they meet Esmer, a powerful being who claims to be the son of Cail – an outcast Haruchai – and the merewives, the mysterious Dancers of the Sea. Linden is unsure whether to treat Esmer as a friend or an enemy: He attacks and wounds Stave (as punishment for his ancestors' treatment of his father), but then proceeds to help Linden. He uses his strange powers to summon a caesure, allowing Linden and her companions to travel backwards in time to retrieve the lost Staff of Law.

They emerge from the caesure in a Land which is still recovering from the Sunbane. After some initial frustration, they find (with some dubious help from Esmer) that the Staff is guarded by a group of Waynhim who – not being creatures of Law – are slowly sickening from its influence. Linden uses the Staff to cure the Waynhim, but she and her companions are suddenly attacked by Demondim (who they suspect have been summoned from the past by the mischievous and unpredictable Esmer) wielding the power of the Illearth Stone.

Fearful that the coming battle will alter the Land's history, Linden creates a new caesure and returns herself, her companions, the ur‑viles, Waynhim, and Demondim to her own present. When they emerge, they find themselves in the neighborhood of Revelstone, which is now the stronghold of the Masters. The Haruchai attempt to fight the Demondim, but their efforts are in vain. Stave is badly injured, and Linden and her companions are forced to retreat to Revelstone.

Here Linden meets the Mahdoubt, a mysterious old woman who describes herself only as "a servant of Revelstone". As the company is enclosed in the Lord's Keep with their foes outside, they see a small group rapidly approaching: her son, Jeremiah, and Thomas Covenant, who has seemingly returned to life.

== Characters in “The Runes of the Earth” ==
- Linden Avery – doctor (also the Chosen, Wildwielder, and Ringthane)
- Jeremiah – her adopted son
- Joan Covenant – Thomas Covenant's ex-wife
- Roger Covenant – Thomas Covenant's now-adult son
- Anele – deranged, loser of the Staff of Law; appears to be the son of Sunder and Hollian
- Stave – Master and Haruchai
- Liand – Stonedownor
- Esmer – son to Cail (a Haruchai) and merewives
- Lord Foul – the old adversary
- Hami – a Ramen Manethrall
- Mahrtiir – a Ramen Manethrall
- Doan – a Ramen Manethrall
- Hyn – a Ranyhyn
- Hynyn – a Ranyhyn
- Thomas Covenant: original Wildwielder; seems to have returned at the end of the book with Jeremiah

== Major themes ==
Two dangers face the Land: the constant threat of the intention of Lord Foul, although his purposes appear more benign than before; and the presence in the Land of white gold (an ultimate source of power) in the hand of one turned mad, Joan Covenant (Thomas's ex-wife).

Similarly, the consequence of potentially using both the Staff of Law (enabling control of Earthpower) and white gold simultaneously is addressed by the main character Linden Avery. The book also explores the idea of the consequences of time travel i.e. what will happen to the future if you alter the past?

== Literary significance and criticism ==
“THE RUNES OF THE EARTH has all the wonders that made the previous two chronicles so readable” Bookreader.com

This novel marks Donaldson’s return to his fantasy epic after a lengthy hiatus. This return came after nearly 25 years of reader expectation and genre development.

Moreover, the novel is significant for how it both adheres to and subtly critiques high‐fantasy conventions (heroic journeys, mythic landscapes) by layering moral ambiguity, psychological complexity, and a sense of existential crisis.

Lastly, the book underscores one of the author’s long-standing strengths- linking individual character arcs to a broader mythic world-system, thus giving the fantasy more gravitas than simple adventure.

== Awards and nominations ==
- World Fantasy Award for Best Novel 2005 nominated and shortlisted

== Release details ==
- 2004, USA, Putnam Publishing Group ISBN 0-399-15232-6, Pub date 14 October 2004, Hardback
- 2004, UK, Gollancz ISBN 0-575-07598-8, Pub date 21 October 2004, Hardback
- 2005, UK, Gollancz ISBN 0-575-07599-6, Pub date 14 April 2005, Trade Paperback
- 2005, USA, Ace Books ISBN 0-441-01304-X, Pub date 6 September 2005, Paperback
- 2005, UK, Gollancz ISBN 0-575-07612-7, Pub date 3 October 2005, Paperback
- 2005, UK, Orion ISBN 0-7528-6971-X, Pub date 3 March 2005, Audio CD (Anton Lesser - Narrator)
- 2005, UK, Orion ISBN 0-7528-6972-8, Pub date 3 March 2005, Audio Cassette (Anton Lesser - Narrator)
