= White Gold Wielder =

1983 novel by Stephen R. Donaldson

- Cover of White Gold Wielder
- Author: Stephen R. Donaldson
- Cover artist: Darrell K. Sweet
- Language: English
- Series: The Second Chronicles of Thomas Covenant
- Genre: Fantasy
- Publisher: Del Rey
- Publication date: 1983
- Publication place: United States
- Media type: Print (Hardback & Paperback)
- Pages: 512
- ISBN: 978-0-345-30307-3
- OCLC: 8930083
- Preceded by: The One Tree
- Followed by: The Runes of the Earth

White Gold Wielder is a fantasy novel by American writer Stephen R. Donaldson, the final book of the second trilogy of The Chronicles of Thomas Covenant series.

== Plot summary ==
Leaving the sunken island of the One Tree, the giant ship Starfare's Gem sets course to return to the Land. In a dangerous region of the ocean known as the Soulbiter, the ship is blown off course into the far northern reaches of the Earth and becomes ice-bound. Realizing that the Land's need cannot wait for the spring melt, Thomas Covenant leaves the ship and strikes out south over the ice-scape, accompanied by Linden, Vain, Findail the Elohim, Cail of the Haruchai, and four giants.

The party faces many perils on their voyage but eventually meets up with Sunder and Hollian, the natives of the Land that Covenant left behind to try to organize opposition to the corrupt Clave. They have little comfort to offer: the Clave has become so blood-hungry that entire villages have been completely emptied in order to sustain the Banefire, making the corruption of nature by the Sunbane worse than ever. Only the stalwart Haruchai, freed from the Clave's magical coercion, have rallied to the side of freedom.

Covenant and his companions nevertheless march on Revelstone, the mountain fortress of the Clave. Once there, Covenant stuns the others by summoning a Sandgorgon, the beast responsible for the deaths of two of his Haruchai companions in the previous book. The Sandgorgon, grateful to Covenant for having previously spared its life, breaches the outer defenses of the great Keep. After a tremendous struggle, Covenant and the Sandgorgon are able to destroy the Raver who leads the Clave, although at the price of the life of Grimmand Honninscrave, the valiant Giant captain of Starfare's Gem.

Mourning the loss of his friend and the deaths of many of the innocent denizens of Revelstone, Covenant is able to come to terms with his power-madness, through a process in which he mimics the Giantish caamora, a ritual of purification by fire. Using the Banefire and the wild magic of his white gold ring, he is able to negate the effect of the strange venom with which he has been infected. The process hurts Covenant but does not do him permanent injury. With the aid of the Sandgorgon, Linden and Covenant are able to extinguish the Banefire. The defeat of the Clave causes the corruption of the Sunbane to diminish but not to disappear.

Sending Cail and the Giant Mistweave to reconnoiter with Starfare's Gem at the eastern coast of the Land, and charging the remaining Haruchai to resume their Bloodguard forebears' role as the warders of Revelstone, Covenant and the rest of his party set out to challenge Lord Foul directly, in his lair in the depths of Mount Thunder. En route, Hollian and her unborn child die resisting an attack of a band of Sunbane-warped ur-viles. Sunder is left numb and wordless with grief: in Andelain the Forestal Caer-Caveral sacrifices his immortal life to re-unite Sunder with Hollian and the yet-to-be-born child and give them a second chance at life. In so doing, he breaks the Law of Life, which prevents the dead from intervening directly in the world of the living. Bereft of the Forestal's protection, Andelain begins to succumb to the Sunbane. Covenant leaves the young family in Andelain and continues his journey, accompanied by Linden, two Giants, Vain, and Findail.

At Mount Thunder, Covenant gives the white gold ring willingly to the Despiser, an action which was foretold by Lord Foul upon Covenant's initial return to the Land; Linden Avery refrains from preventing him from this action, despite her ability to do so. The Despiser then kills Covenant, and attempts to destroy the Arch of Time with the wild magic. However, Covenant's spirit blocks his assault: in a manner similar to the cleansing experience with the Banefire, the power of wild magic causes Covenant pain but does not harm him, and in fact makes him more powerful with each attack. (Covenant later explains, "Foul did the one thing I couldn't: he burned the venom away.") Covenant's ability to interfere in this manner is revealed as a consequence of the breaking of the Law of Life and a fulfillment of Lord Mhoram's prophecy ("You are the white gold"). Unable to comprehend this, Lord Foul continues to attack Covenant's spirit until he vanishes, drained of all his power. Linden Avery then takes the white gold ring, and uses it to bond Vain with Findail. Linden thus creates a new Staff of Law, combining the rigidness and structure of the ur-viles' lore with the pure and free Earthpower of the Elohim. Then, combining the new Staff with the power of the wild magic, she heals the Land of the Sunbane.

Giving the Staff to the Giants to take to Sunder and Hollian, Linden fades away. In the limbo between the worlds, Covenant speaks to her and explains how he defeated Foul and re-assures her that their love will transcend both time and death. Linden wakes up in the "real" world, finding Covenant dead, as expected, but takes comfort in the knowledge that through his love, she has redeemed both herself and the Land. At the very end of the book, Linden takes Covenant's white gold wedding ring.

== Reception ==
Dave Langford reviewed White Gold Wielder for White Dwarf #40, and stated that "Donaldson's convoluted approach to fantasy is original and welcome, though Covenant's endless tortured dilemmas can pall. A further annoyance is the diction, clumsily erudite as ever [...] If only some editor had cleaned out this nonsense and trimmed the book to liftable size."

Dave Pringle reviewed White Gold Wielder for Imagine magazine, and stated that "White Gold Wielder is a stronger work than the preceding tome (The One Tree)."

Ruth Campbell noted that "(...) When writing this, Donaldson must have been aware that he was writing to an audience highly familiar with The Lord of the Rings and most particularly, with the cataclysmic scene on Mount Doom. Like me, anybody familiar with that book and that scene must have gasped with horror at discovering that Covenant intended to give the Ring willingly to Foul. What? How could he do such a thing? Give the Ring willingly to that evil being? Is Covenant out of his mind? And then the result vindicates him. What an anticipatory laughter Donaldson must have had at our expense when writing this scene! Well, it turns out that what would have been the very worst course for Frodo was the best for Covenant. It is not the same kind of Ring, not the same kind of magic. Most important, it is not the same writer... A neat trick, that."
