= A Man Rides Through =

1987 novel by Stephen R. Donaldson

- Author: Stephen R. Donaldson

A Man Rides Through is a novel by Stephen R. Donaldson published in 1987.

== Plot summary ==
A Man Rides Through is a novel in which characters change allegiances as enemies become allies.

== Reception ==
Dave Langford reviewed A Man Rides Through for White Dwarf #100, and stated that "Donaldson could usefully have boiled out lots of repetition, especially when in Significant Italics, and his efforts to end passages with striking sentences can be clumsy or laughable ('He felt like crowing.'), but after all my brickbats he deserves a pat on the head. This author is genuinely improving."

== Reviews ==
- Review by Faren Miller (1987) in Locus, #320 September 1987
- Review by Don D'Ammassa (1987) in Science Fiction Chronicle, #99 December 1987
- Review by Chris Barker (1988) in Vector 143
