= The Gap Cycle =

Science fiction novels by Stephen R. Donaldson

The Gap Cycle is a series of science fiction novels by Stephen R. Donaldson, more usually known for his works of epic fantasy. The series was originally published between 1991 and 1996 by Bantam Books and was reprinted by Gollancz in 2008 in the UK. Here, Donaldson gave a loose retelling of Wagner's Ring cycle.

== Premise ==
It is an epic work set in a future where humans have pushed far out into space in the name of commerce. The series follows two concurrent story arcs. The first concerns an ensign in the United Mining Companies Police (UMCP), Morn Hyland, who is attempting to stay alive after being captured by a marauder named Angus Thermopylae. The second follows the fate of three people who are affected by the Byzantine political maneuvering of the head of the UMCP, Warden Dios, as he attempts to thwart the machinations of his boss, the CEO of United Mining Companies (UMC) itself, Holt Fasner.

== Books in series ==
1. The Gap into Conflict: The Real Story, Bantam/Spectra, 1990
2. The Gap into Vision: Forbidden Knowledge, Bantam/Spectra, 1991
3. The Gap into Power: A Dark and Hungry God Arises, Bantam/Spectra, 1992
4. The Gap into Madness: Chaos and Order, Bantam/Spectra, 1994
5. The Gap into Ruin: This Day All Gods Die, Bantam/Spectra, 1996

The Victor Gollancz Ltd (UK) reprints combine the first two books into a single volume. This was, according to Donaldson's official website, at his request.

== Origins ==
According to the author's afterword in The Gap Into Conflict: The Real Story (1990), the series was originally envisioned as a novella in which characters representing villain, victim, and rescuer would switch places during the course of the narrative. When Donaldson found the result unsatisfying, the book was shelved until he thought of now retelling of Wagner's Der Ring des Nibelungen in the same universe and casting the characters from the first novel in roles based on those from Wagner's opera.
