= The Chronicles of Thomas Covenant =

Series of fantasy novels by Stephen R. Donaldson

- Lord Foul's Bane (1977); The Illearth War (1978); The Power that Preserves (1979); The Wounded Land (1980); The One Tree (1982); White Gold Wielder (1983); The Runes of the Earth (2004); Fatal Revenant (2007); Against All Things Ending (2010); The Last Dark (2013)
- Author: Stephen R. Donaldson
- Cover artist: Peter Goodfellow; Darrell K. Sweet
- Country: United States
- Language: English
- Genre: High fantasy
- Publisher: Ballantine Books; Gollancz Science Fiction; Del Rey Books; G.P. Putnam's Sons
- Published: 1977–2013
- Media type: Print (hardback & paperback); Audiobook; E-book
- No. of books: 10

The Chronicles of Thomas Covenant is a series of ten high fantasy novels written by American author Stephen R. Donaldson. The series began as a trilogy, The Chronicles of Thomas Covenant the Unbeliever. This was followed by another trilogy, The Second Chronicles of Thomas Covenant, and finally a tetralogy, The Last Chronicles of Thomas Covenant.

The main character of the stories is Thomas Covenant, an embittered and cynical writer afflicted with leprosy and shunned by society but fated to become the heroic savior of the Land, an alternate world. In ten novels, published between 1977 and 2013, he struggles against Lord Foul "the Despiser" who attempts to escape the bondage of the physical universe and wreak revenge upon his arch-enemy, "the Creator".

== The Chronicles of Thomas Covenant the Unbeliever ==
1. Lord Foul's Bane (1977)
2. The Illearth War (1978; Gilden-Fire—first published 1981)
3. The Power that Preserves (1979)

The story Gilden-Fire first appeared as an independent novella (illustrated by Peter Goodfellow), but is now most widely available as a part of most versions of the Donaldson short story collection Daughter of Regals (1985). It was set during the action of The Illearth War, and covers an episode from the doomed mission to contact the Giants. Gilden-Fire is told from the point of view of Korik, the senior Bloodguard on the mission. It describes Korik's selection of the mission's Bloodguard, then narrates the mission's passage through Grimmerdhore forest, where they defeat an ambush of ur-viles and kresh (wolves). The narrative ends as the mission leaves the forest.

According to the author's foreword, Gilden-Fire was originally part of a larger, planned section of The Illearth War that followed the mission to the Giants in "real time", but was cut due to space restrictions as well as point-of-view inconsistency with the rest of the Chronicles. The events during the trek through Grimmerdhore are not mentioned in the published narrative of The Illearth War, and some information shared here on the origin and motivation of the Bloodguard does appear in other contexts in the published Chronicles. The rest of the mission after the Grimmerdhore passage was included in the Chronicles, via the narrative device of Bloodguard messengers.

== The Second Chronicles of Thomas Covenant ==
1. The Wounded Land (1980)
2. The One Tree (1982)
3. White Gold Wielder (1983)

== The Last Chronicles of Thomas Covenant ==
1. The Runes of the Earth (2004)
2. Fatal Revenant (2007)
3. Against All Things Ending (2010)
4. The Last Dark (2013)

== Peoples and creatures of the Land ==
Cavewights are dimly intelligent subterranean creatures skilled in metal working and mining. They are weak-willed, and are easily intimidated by Lord Foul into serving him (though they once traded openly with the humans of the Land). They are described as having "long, scrawny limbs, hands as huge and heavy as shovels", plus "a thin, hunched torso, and a head shaped like a battering ram". Drool Rockworm is a cavewight.

The Creator is the mysterious being who created the Land and the universe in which it exists. This universe is referred to as "the Land" but is clearly a different reality than Covenant's world. The fundamental structure of the universe, the Arch of Time, prevents the Creator from intervening directly in events in the world of his creation, and he never appears in physical form within that world. He can, however, manifest himself in the "real" world—he appears to Covenant and Linden as an old man in an ochre robe—and guides those who attempt to make contact between the universes.

The Demondim are a now-extinct race spawned by the Viles. They had a semi-corporeal nature, and could only achieve physical presence by animating dead bodies. They were not originally wholly evil, but their inherent self-loathing was used by Lord Foul to gain their allegiance. They spawned two other races, the Waynhim and the ur-viles.

The Elohim are a "faerie" people with god-like powers. They appear (to mortal perceptions) as beautiful men and women and are capable of dazzling physical transformations. They inhabit a remote region of the Earth called Elmesnedene, accessible only by ship via a narrow fjord called "The Raw". Although other people are welcome to visit and even stay in Elmesnedene, time flows quickly there and even the long-lived Giants grow rapidly old and die. From their own perspective the Elohim constitute the animating principle of the Earth and the history of the Land is the manifestation of events in their own consciousness. As they regard their own domain as the only "real" place on Earth, they rarely dabble in outside events. However, if they perceive a grave threat to the Earth, one of their number is "Appointed" to attempt to avert the threat – and to bear the cost of failing. It is later learned that the Elohim's purpose is to keep the Worm of the World's End in its deep slumber, prolonging the life of the world.

Forestals are beings who serve the forests of the Land, the remnants of the One Forest, the great sentient wood which once covered the Land. They are human in appearance, but according to the Elohim they were created by the One Forest itself using knowledge from another Elohim imprisoned within the Colossus. The Forestals actively protected the remaining forest from destruction by encroaching mortals. They were more numerous in the distant past but few survived into the era of the New Lords. By the time of the Second Chronicles, when the remnants of the ancient forest (with the exception of Giant Woods in the Lower Land) were long dead, the last remaining Forestal lived in Andelain. His name was Caer-Caveral, though he was originally Hile Troy, a man from Covenant's world who had once been Warmark (commander-in-chief) of the Lords' army. As described in The Illearth War, Lord Mhoram sang the Forestals' own song ("I am the forest..."). Although it did get the Attention of the Forestal of Garroting Deep, and he did grant to boon to allow mortals under the trees in exchange for the chance to Punish a Raver, he exacted the price of Hile Troy becoming a Forestal. Hile Troy was willing to pay that price, to save the army under his command from defeat and destruction.

The Giants are a race of extremely long-lived (but nevertheless mortal) humanoids of unusual height and strength. Giants are known for their stone lore (similar to but not identical with that of the Stonedownors), their skill at seamanship, their good humour and their love of story-telling. A common Giantish interjection is "Stone and Sea!" Giants are resistant to cold and cannot be harmed by ordinary fire. Fire does, however, cause them intense pain, which they use to cure themselves of grief in a ritual known as caamora. In return for a favor performed for the mysterious Elohim long ago, the entire race of Giants are endowed with an innate ability to speak and understand all languages. The Giants' own language is very florid and verbose, and they find human speech to be rather curt and inexpressive. The Giants of the Land are sometimes called the Unhomed since they were separated from their homeland long ago. Although the Giants love children, they are becoming infertile, and their numbers are dwindling. Kevin Landwaster entrusted them with the first of his Seven Wards before the Ritual of Desecration. They sometimes address (and are addressed by) humans as "Rockbrother" or "Rocksister", in honor of the ancient alliance they made with High Lord Damelon Giantfriend. Saltheart Foamfollower is a Giant.

The Griffins are winged lions. They are sometimes ridden by ur-viles.

The Haruchai are a hardy race of warriors living in the Westron Mountains, west of the Land. The Haruchai shun the use of weapons or magic, taking pride in their own physical prowess and the purity of their service, which is never given lightly. They have the ability to communicate amongst themselves via telepathy, and each can access the combined memories of their entire race. Outwardly stoic, even seemingly emotionless, they could also be considered arrogant in their beliefs. It is revealed on several occasions that the Haruchai are a deeply passionate race, capable of swearing a lifetime's worth of service if sufficiently moved.

The Insequent are a mysterious race of people who dwell to the west of the Land. Each Insequent has a unique and very focused skill that can seem magical or superhuman. These skills range from invisibility, virtual invulnerability, or even time travel. They have an almost dismissive disdain for the Haruchai and a bitter and long-standing rivalry with the Elohim, which has not yet been fully explained. They rarely reveal their true names, but prefer to be identified by their titles. So far only four Insequent have appeared in the stories: The Mahdoubt, the Harrow, the Theomach and the Ardent. A fifth, the Vizard, is referenced by several other characters, and a sixth—the Auriference—is mentioned briefly by the Ardent, although both the Vizard and the Auriference are believed to be deceased; however, it was revealed that the Auriference had been consumed by She Who Must Not Be Named. She was released from that fate by Linden Avery, and absorbed by an Ur-Vile.

The Lords are the leaders and stewards of the Land, also known as Earthfriends. The standards for Lordship are high, so they are generally few in number. In order to become a Lord, a person must master the martial arts and the theory and application of magic. These skills are called the Sword and the Staff respectively, and together form the First Ward of Kevin's Lore, an ancient repository of knowledge. A student who masters both parts of the Lore – and does not opt to become Unfettered in order to pursue a private vision – is invited to join the Council of Lords at Revelstone, also known as Lord's Keep. The Lords carry special staffs that allow them to channel their power, and are easily identified by their sky blue robes.

Lord Foul is the most commonly used name for the ancient enemy of the Land, given to him by the Council of Lords. He is also called "The Despiser", the "Gray Slayer" (his name in The Plains), "Fangthane the Render" by the Ramen, and "a-Jeroth of the Seven Hells" by The Clave. According to Roger Covenant, he also called himself "a-Jeroth" during the time he served on Kevin's council. He is described as "the wicked son or brother of the Creator's heart" and is the source of all evil in the Land. He is a being of pure spirit, although capable of taking on human form, and is apparently immortal: he cannot be killed, but his power can be reduced to near insignificance. On occasions when this has happened he has always been able to restore and regenerate his power. His desire to bring suffering to the earth and the Land in particular is manifested by his extremely well orchestrated and even cautious long-term plans throughout the chronicles.

The Ramen tend to the needs of the Ranyhyn (see below). The Ramen's life-work is to serve the Ranyhyn, whom they hold in very high esteem. Traditionally they do not ride or otherwise subjugate the great horses, and can grow resentful of those who do. The fact that the Lords of Revelstone and the Bloodguard often ride the great horses is a major point of contention, but the Ramen tolerate this in deference to the Ranyhyn, who choose to give their service. When defending the Ranyhyn from Kresh (large wolves in service to the Despiser) or other predators, the Ramen frequently use ropes as garottes to break the attackers' necks. Ramen are organised into three "ranks": Manethralls who are the leaders, Cords who assist the Manethralls while training to become Manethralls themselves, and Winhomes who perform domestic supporting duties. Two other ranks are mentioned in The Runes of the Earth, Keepers and Curriers, but their placement within the Ramen hierarchy is not known.

The Ranyhyn are the great horses of the Land. In the early books these horses live on the Plains of Ra, though in the age of the Sunbane they leave the Land altogether. They are protected by their human servants the Ramen. The Ranyhyn are akin to normal horses, but are larger, always have a star, and are in some indefinable sense enhanced by the Earthpower of the Land, so that their speed, endurance and intelligence outstrip those of a standard horse. The Ranyhyn can be ridden by individuals they deem worthy, but a person who seeks such a mount must travel to the Plains of Ra and offer himself to the horses for consideration. If a Ranyhyn accepts a rider, it is loyal to that rider until death. All of the Bloodguard (apparently) are accepted by the Ranyhyn, but not all Lords have been deemed worthy. The Ranyhyn also have a limited ability to perceive the future; these horses can "hear" when their rider will need them, hearing their calling days or weeks before the rider makes the call. Thus, when the rider summons his Ranyhyn, it appears shortly thereafter, regardless of the distance between them.

Ravers are bodiless evil spirits with the ability to possess and control some lesser creatures, and most humans as well. Giants and Bloodguard are typically immune to this power, and there are no known instances of a Raver possessing a Ranyhyn. There are only three Ravers, ancient brothers who each have many names but are commonly called Turiya Herem, Samadhi Sheol, and Moksha Jehannum. Their greatest hatred is reserved for the trees of the One Forest of old, and their loathing of the Earthpower and all good things has led them to become Lord Foul's willing servants. The Despiser is somehow able to enhance their abilities when he pleases, but can prevent them from possessing individuals he deems too powerful (they were not allowed to possess Thomas Covenant, for instance, because his ring would make them too powerful for Lord Foul to control). This possession can be, and in some cases needs to be, facilitated by some external power. In the 'Illearth War' the Ravers were only able to possess their giant 'hosts' when they worked in harmony with the power of the Illearth Stone. They often serve as leaders in Lord Foul's armies, or as spies among his enemies.

Stonedownors are humans descended from the Land's original inhabitants. They are known for their knowledge of stone lore and live in stone huts. A master of stone lore is called a "Gravelingas", or a Rhadhamaerl which also refers to the craft of stone lore. Stonedownors are typically dark-skinned, squat and muscular, though this is not always the case. Trell and Triock are both unusually tall for Stonedownors. During the Second Chronicles, their leaders are known as Gravellers, and sacrifice members of their village to use the blood to call forth the power of the Sunbane. Sunder, the Graveller of Mithil Stonedown, manages to use the power of Loric's Krill to summon forth the power of the Sunbane without shedding blood, and learns to manipulate the Sunbane for his own purposes.

Ur-viles are blind yet highly magical creatures of jet black color and are constructs of an extinct race named the Demondim. One of their most distinctive abilities is that when assembled in a wedge formation, the leader (or loremaster) at the apex wields the combined power of the entire group, without weakening any of their kin in the rest of the wedge. The ur-viles initially served Lord Foul, but later turned against him by creating the creature Vain (from which the new Staff of Law was created). In The Runes of the Earth, the ur-viles have actively joined the side of "good", though their motivation remains unclear. Because they were made rather than born, the ur-viles loathe their own bodies and often redirect this rage towards other targets. They also do not die, except when killed, or reproduce naturally, although they do retain the lore required to construct more of their own kind and the Waynhim—however, their motivations for doing so are unlike those of natural creatures.

Viles are an extinct race who spawned the Demondim. They were non-corporeal, but nonetheless very powerful. Initially a proud and gifted race, they were led into self-hatred and despair by the Ravers. They were eventually destroyed by the Council of Lords, under High Lord Loric "Vilesilencer".

The Waynhim are another race of creatures spawned by the Demondim that closely resemble the Ur-viles, though smaller and lighter in color. Like the Ur-viles (who are their long-standing nemeses), the Waynhim were made rather than born. However, they do not share their cousins' self-hatred, and have dedicated themselves to serving the Land and the Earthpower according to their own peculiar ethical system, the Weird of the Waynhim. Like the Ur-viles, they fight in a wedge formation with a loremaster at the apex.

The Woodhelvennin are humans descended from the Land's original inhabitants. They are known for their use of wood lore and living in tree-top villages called "woodhelvens". The village elders are called Heers. A master of wood lore is called a Hirebrand, or a lillianrill (Lillianrill usually refers to the craft of wood lore). They are typically fair-skinned, tall and slender. During the age of the Sunbane, in the absence of permanent trees, woodhelvens became villages of wooden huts.

== Main concepts ==
Map drawn by Lynn K. Plagge to illustrate the books.

In Donaldson's fiction, Andelain is a focal region of the Land, where the Earthpower is especially strong. In the Second Chronicles it is the one place immune from the Sunbane, as it is protected by the Forestal Caer Caveral.

Languages: Human inhabitants of the Land (together with Giants, Cavewights, and the human inhabitants of other regions of the Earth) all appear to speak modern English, though their style of speech is usually rather formal and archaic. The strange commonality of language between Covenant and the Land's inhabitants is never addressed in the books. There are, however, other languages extant: for example, in Lord Foul's Bane, Atiaran tells Thomas Covenant that a different language was spoken in the age of the Old Lords. (However, this appears to be contradicted in Fatal Revenant, when Linden Avery and Berek Halfhand converse together in English.) Non-humans also have their own languages, for example the barking speech of ur-viles and Waynhim, the Giants' florid and ornate language, and the native tongue of the Haruchai. In the Second Chronicles it is explained that the Giants received "the gift of tongues" from the Elohim as a reward for the telling of a simple tale (although they later learned to true reason why that gift was granted, and greatly regretted accepting it), and the Bhrathair, a people who live on the edge of the Great Desert, also speak their own language, which is described only as sounding "brackish".

Worm/Word/Weird. In the cosmology of the Land, the Earth's core consists of a coiled-up serpent called the "Worm of the World's End". When Covenant attempts to sever a branch of the One Tree by using the power of the white gold, he risks rousing the Worm (which is not fully asleep, but merely resting) and thus destroying the Earth. The Waynhim and Ur-viles believe in a principle of ethics or destiny called the "Weird". The Elohim have a concept which appears to do duty for both these beliefs: it is impossible to determine whether the sound used for this is "Worm", "Word" or "Weird", as it comes out in a blurred form sounding something like "Würd".

== Terminology ==
In the Thomas Covenant stories, Donaldson takes several terms from Sanskrit that are significant in Hinduism and Buddhism and reassigns them meanings in the Land. For example, the term moksha, which in Sanskrit refers to liberation from the cycle of sorrow, is given as the original name for a creature of depravity and evil called a Raver. Another Raver, Satansfist, is called samādhi, which in Sanskrit refers to a state of mind in which one achieves oneness with the object of one's concentration. The third Raver, Kinslaughterer, is called turiya, Sanskrit for a state of pure consciousness. Donaldson has commented on his website that moksha, samadhi, and turiya are ways the Ravers describe themselves, while their other names are given by others.

== Critical response ==
The first volume in the series was included in David Pringle's book Modern Fantasy: The 100 Best Novels.

Conversely, in 1986, David Langford published an essay by Nick Lowe, in which Lowe suggested "a way to derive pleasure from Stephen Donaldson books. (Needless to say, it doesn't involve reading them.)" This proposal involved a game he called "Clench Racing", wherein players each open a volume of the Chronicles of Thomas Covenant to a random page; the winner is the first to find the word "clench". Lowe describes it as a "fast" game – "sixty seconds is unusually drawn out".

In 1995, scholar W. A. Senior published a full-length study published by Kent State University Press entitled Stephen R. Donaldson's Chronicles of Thomas Covenant: Variations on the Fantasy of Tradition. It situates the Chronicles in the context of the fantasy tradition and argues that "Donaldson has created an important contribution to the canon because of his serious intent and adult concerns, his powerful mythopoesis, and his manipulation of the conventions of epic fantasy."

In 2013, Tom Shippey, writing in The Wall Street Journal, declared that, "in time The Chronicles of Thomas Covenant will be seen as one of the self-defining works of the third millennium, our equivalent in scope and ambition of earlier epics and fantasies, from Virgil's Aeneid to Tennyson's Arthurian Idylls and Tolkien's Lord of the Rings."

== General and cited sources ==
- Fonstad, Karen Wynn (1985), The Atlas of the Land, New York: Ballantine Books, ISBN 978-0-345-31433-8
