= 1991 in literature =

This article contains information about the literary events and publications of 1991.

== Events ==
- February – Sisters Vanessa Redgrave (Olga) and Lynn Redgrave (Masha) make their first and only joint appearance on stage, with niece Jemma Redgrave as Irina, in the title rôles of Chekhov's Three Sisters at the Queen's Theatre, London.
- July 11 – Hitoshi Igarashi (born 1947), Japanese translator of Salman Rushdie's 1988 novel The Satanic Verses, is stabbed to death at the University of Tsukuba during the Satanic Verses controversy, in accordance with a fatwa against those involved in circulating the book.
- October – Irvine Welsh's first published fiction, the short story "The First Day of the Edinburgh Festival", appears in New Writing Scotland. It is later incorporated into Trainspotting.
- November 4 – An archaeological expedition is launched, eventually resulting in the discovery of a mass grave and identification of the body of the novelist Alain-Fournier, 77 years after his death as Lieutenant Henri-Alban Fournier in World War I. His bones are interred at Saint-Remy-la-Calonne.

== New books ==
=== Fiction ===
- Julia Alvarez – How the García Girls Lost Their Accents
- Martin Amis – Time's Arrow: or the Nature of the Offence
- Piers Anthony
  - Tatham Mound
  - Question Quest
  - Virtual Mode
- Jeffrey Archer – As the Crow Flies
- Beryl Bainbridge – The Birthday Boys
- Clive Barker – Imajica
- Pat Barker – Regeneration
- Julian Barnes – Talking It Over
- Louis Begley – Wartime Lies
- Louis de Bernières – Señor Vivo and the Coca Lord
- A. S. Byatt – Possession: A Romance
- Agatha Christie (d. 1976) – Problem at Pollensa Bay and Other Stories
- Tom Clancy – The Sum of All Fears
- Mary Higgins Clark – Loves Music, Loves to Dance
- Hugh Cook – The Werewolf and the Wormlord
- Paul Cornell – Timewyrm: Revelation
- Bernard Cornwell – Stormchild
- Douglas Coupland – Generation X: Tales for an Accelerated Culture
- L. Sprague de Camp and Catherine Crook de Camp – The Pixilated Peeress
- Don DeLillo – Mao II (1992 PEN/Faulkner Award for Fiction)
- Terrance Dicks – Timewyrm: Exodus
- Assia Djebar – Far from Medina (Loin de Médine)
- Stephen R. Donaldson
  - The Gap into Conflict: The Real Story
  - The Gap into Vision: Forbidden Knowledge
- Roddy Doyle – The Van
- Kaori Ekuni (江國 香織) – Kirakira Hikaru (Twinkle, Twinkle)
- Bret Easton Ellis – American Psycho
- Joy Fielding – See Jane Run
- Stephen Fry – The Liar
- Diana Gabaldon – Outlander
- Neil Gaiman
  - The Sandman: Preludes & Nocturnes (graphic novel; volume 1 in The Sandman series)
  - The Sandman: Dream Country (graphic novel; volume 3 in The Sandman series)
- John Gardner – The Man from Barbarossa
- David Gates – Jernigan
- Ann Granger – Say It With Poison
- John Grisham – The Firm
- Josephine Hart – Damage
- Elisabeth Harvor – Our Lady of All Distances (11 stories; revision of Women and Children, 1973)
- Mark Jacobson – Gojiro (The Lampshade: A Holocaust Detective Story from Buchenwald to New Orleans)
- Stephen King – Needful Things
- Ágota Kristóf – The Third Lie
- John le Carré – The Secret Pilgrim
- Leslie Marmon Silko – Almanac of the Dead
- Penelope Lively – City of the Mind
- Morgan Llywelyn – Druids
- Rohinton Mistry – Such a Long Journey
- Timothy Mo – The Redundancy of Courage
- Cees Nooteboom – The Following Story
- Ben Okri – The Famished Road (1991 Booker Prize)
- Leonardo Padura Fuentes – Pasado perfecto (translated as Havana Blue)
- John Peel – Timewyrm: Genesys
- Tito Perdue – Lee
- Ellis Peters – The Summer of the Danes
- Marge Piercy – He, She and It
- Terry Pratchett
  - Reaper Man
  - Witches Abroad
- Jean Raspail – Sire
- Alexandra Ripley – Scarlett
- J. Jill Robinson – Saltwater Trees
- Nigel Robinson – Timewyrm: Apocalypse
- Bernice Rubens – A Solitary Grief
- Norman Rush – Mating (1991 National Book Award for Fiction)
- José Saramago – The Gospel According to Jesus Christ (O Evangelho Segundo Jesus Cristo)
- Michael Shaara (posthumously) – For Love of the Game
- Sidney Sheldon – The Doomsday Conspiracy
- Jane Smiley – A Thousand Acres (1991 National Book Critics Circle Award for Fiction; 1992 Pulitzer Prize for Fiction)
- Danielle Steel – Heartbeat
- Michael Swanwick – Gravity's Angels
- Antonio Tabucchi – Requiem: A Hallucination
- Amy Tan – The Kitchen God's Wife
- Andrew Vachss – Sacrifice
- Bernard Werber – Empire of the Ants (Les Fourmis)
- Tim Winton – Cloudstreet
- Helen Zahavi – Dirty Weekend
- Timothy Zahn – Heir to the Empire
- Haifa Zangana – Through the Vast Halls of Memory
- Roger Zelazny – Prince of Chaos

=== Children and young people ===
- Arnold Adoff – In for Winter, Out for Spring
- Chris Van Allsburg – The Wretched Stone
- Avi – Nothing but the Truth: A Documentary Novel
- Margaret Barbalet (illustrated by Jane Tanner) – The Wolf
- Berlie Doherty – Dear Nobody
- Sarah Ellis – Pick-Up Sticks
- Karen Wynn Fonstad (with J. R. R. Tolkien and Alan Lee) - The Atlas of Middle-earth
- Jostein Gaarder – Sophie's World (Sofies verden), English translation 1995
- Sonia Levitin – The Man Who Kept His Heart in a Bucket
- Jacqueline Wilson – The Story of Tracy Beaker (first in the Tracy Beaker series of six books)
- G. Clifton Wisler – Red Cap

=== Drama ===
- Ariel Dorfman – Death and the Maiden
- Tony Kushner – Angels in America: A Gay Fantasia on National Themes (first part premières)
- Mustapha Matura – The Coup
- Philip Ridley – The Pitchfork Disney
- Neil Simon – Lost in Yonkers
- George Tabori – Goldberg Variations
- Timberlake Wertenbaker – Three Birds Alighting on a Field

=== Non-fiction ===
- Dionne Brand – No Burden to Carry: Narratives of Black Working Women in Ontario
- Joseph A. Califano Jr. – The Triumph and Tragedy of Lyndon Johnson: The White House Years
- Marjorie Chibnall – Empress Matilda
- Henry Steele Commager – Churchill's History of the English-Speaking Peoples
- Jung Chang (張戎) – Wild Swans: Three Daughters of China
- Françoise Dunand – Mummies: A Voyage Through Eternity
- Koenraad Elst – Ayodhya and after: issues before Hindu society
- Dave Foreman – Confessions of an Eco-Warrior
- Robert Hart – Forest Gardening: Rediscovering Nature and Community in a Post-Industrial Age
- Albert Hourani – A History of the Arab Peoples
- Anne Hugon – The Exploration of Africa: From Cairo to the Cape
- Pauline Kael – Movie Love
- Alan Macfarlane – The Diary of Ralph Josselin, 1616–1683
- Madonna – Sex
- Robert K. Massie – Dreadnought: Britain, Germany, and the Coming of the Great War
- Taslima Nasrin – Jabo na keno? jabo
- P.J. O'Rourke – Parliament of Whores
- Thomas Pakenham – The Scramble for Africa
- William Pokhlyobkin – A History of Vodka
- John Richardson – A Life of Picasso
- Simon Schama – Dead Certainties
- Art Spiegelman – Maus: A Survivor's Tale (II: And Here My Troubles Began) (graphic biography/autobiography)
- Georges Tate – L'Orient des Croisades
- Marie Wadden – Nitassinan: The Innu Struggle to Reclaim Their Homeland
- Naomi Wolf – The Beauty Myth: How Images of Beauty Are Used Against Women
- Zhang Chengzhi – History of the Soul

== Births ==
- January 23 – Jonahmae Panen Pacala (known as Jonaxx), Filipino Wattpad author
- April 1 – Kat Zhang, American young-adult and middle-grade fiction writer
- April 20 – Marieke Lucas Rijneveld, Dutch novelist and poet
- unknown dates
  - Gabriel Bergmoser, Australian author, playwright and screenwriter
  - Chibundu Onuzo, Nigerian novelist
  - Sally Rooney, Irish fiction writer

== Deaths ==
- January 22 – Robert Choquette, Canadian novelist and poet (born 1905)
- January 23 – Northrop Frye, Canadian literary critic (born 1912)
- January 29 – Yasushi Inoue, Japanese novelist (born 1907)
- February 1 – Ahmad Abd al-Ghafur Attar, Saudi Arabian writer, journalist and poet (born 1916)
- February 16 – Muhammad Sa'id al-Amudi, Saudi Arabian journalist, literary critic and official (born 1905)
- February 24 – John Daly, American journalist and game show host (born 1914)
- March 2 – Mary Howard (Mary Mussi), English romance novelist (born 1907)
- March 14 – Margery Sharp, English novelist and children's writer (born 1905)
- March 22 – Paul Engle, American poet and novelist (born 1908)
- April 3 – Graham Greene, English novelist (born 1904)
- April 4 – Max Frisch, Swiss playwright and novelist (born 1911)
- April 5 – Eve Garnett, English children's writer and illustrator (born 1900)
- April 12 – James Schuyler, American poet (born 1923)
- April 15 – Dante Milano, Brazilian modernist poet (born 1899)
- May 3 – Jerzy Kosinski, Polish-American novelist (born 1933; suicide)
- May 31 – Angus Wilson, English novelist (born 1913)
- June 24 – Sumner Locke Elliott, Australian-American author and playwright (born 1917)
- July 5 – Howard Nemerov, American poet (born 1920)
- July 24 – Isaac Bashevis Singer, Polish-born Jewish-American novelist (born 1902)
- August 1 – Yusuf Idris, Egyptian writer (born 1927)
- August 13 – John Sommerfield, English communist writer (born 1908)
- August 17 – Terence Kilmartin, Irish journalist and translator (born 1922)
- September 4
  - Peggy Ramsay, British theatrical agent (born 1908)
  - Tom Tryon, American actor and writer (born 1926)
- September 24 – Dr. Seuss (Theodor Seuss Geisel), American children's writer (born 1904)
- September 27 – Roy Fuller, English poet (born 1912)
- October 7 – Natalia Ginzburg, Italian writer (born 1916)
- October 11 – Steven "Jesse" Bernstein, American performance poet (born 1950; suicide)
- October 12 – Arkady Strugatsky, Russian science fiction writer (born 1925)
- October 16 – Leon Levițchi, Romanian translator (born 1918)
- October 27 – George Barker, English poet (born 1913)
- November 29 – Frank Yerby, African American historical novelist (born 1916)
- December 5 – Jack Trevor Story, English novelist (born 1917)
- December 11 – Artur Lundkvist, Swedish author (born 1906)
- December 27 – Hervé Guibert, French writer and photographer (born 1955)
- Unknown date – Gogu Rădulescu, Romanian communist politician, journalist, and patron of the arts (born 1914)

== Awards ==
- Nobel Prize for Literature: Nadine Gordimer
- Camões Prize: José Craveirinha

=== Australia ===
- The Australian/Vogel Literary Award: Andrew McGahan, Praise
- C. J. Dennis Prize for Poetry: Jennifer Maiden, The Winter Baby
- Kenneth Slessor Prize for Poetry: Jennifer Maiden, The Winter Baby
- Mary Gilmore Prize: Jean Kent, Verandahs
- Miles Franklin Award: David Malouf, The Great World

=== Canada ===
- See 1991 Governor General's Awards for a complete list of winners and finalists for those awards.
- The Edna Staebler Award is established to honor the best literary work of creative non-fiction by a Canadian author who had published their first or second writing within the preceding year.
- Edna Staebler Award for Creative Non-Fiction: Susan Mayse, Ginger
- Arthur Ellis Award for Best True Crime: Susan Mayse, Ginger

=== France ===
- Prix Goncourt: Pierre Combescot, Les Filles du Calvaire
- Prix Décembre: Raphaël Confiant, Eau de café
- Prix Médicis: Pierre Simon, La Dérive des sentiments

=== United Kingdom ===
- Booker Prize: Ben Okri, The Famished Road
- Carnegie Medal for children's literature: Berlie Doherty, Dear Nobody
- Cholmondeley Award: James Berry, Sujata Bhatt, Michael Hulse, Derek Mahon
- Eric Gregory Award: Roddy Lumsden, Glyn Maxwell, Stephen Smith, Wayne Burrows, Jackie Kay
- Guardian Fiction Award: Alan Judd, The Devil's Own Work
- James Tait Black Memorial Prize for fiction: Iain Sinclair, Downriver
- James Tait Black Memorial Prize for biography: Adrian Desmond and James Moore, Darwin
- Queen's Gold Medal for Poetry: Judith Wright
- Whitbread Best Book Award: John Richardson, A Life of Picasso
- The Sunday Express Book of the Year: Michael Frayn, A Landing on the Sun

=== United States ===
- Agnes Lynch Starrett Poetry Prize: Julia Kasdorf, Sleeping Preacher
- Aiken Taylor Award for Modern American Poetry: John Frederick Nims
- American Academy of Arts and Letters Gold Medal in Poetry: Richard Wilbur
- Bernard F. Connors Prize for Poetry: Donald Hall, The Museum of Clear Ideas
- Compton Crook Award: Michael Flynn, In the Country of the Blind
- Frost Medal: Donald Hall
- Nebula Award: Michael Swanwick, Stations of the Tide
- Newbery Medal for children's literature: Jerry Spinelli, Maniac Magee
- Pulitzer Prize for Drama: Neil Simon, Lost in Yonkers
- Pulitzer Prize for Fiction: John Updike: Rabbit at Rest
- Pulitzer Prize for General Nonfiction: Edward O. Wilson: The Ants
- Pulitzer Prize for Poetry: Mona Van Duyn: Near Changes
- Whiting Awards:

Fiction: Rebecca Goldstein, Allegra Goodman, John Holman, Cynthia Kadohata, Rick Rofihe, J Anton Shammas (fiction/nonfiction)
Nonfiction: Stanley Crouch
Plays: Scott McPherson
Poetry: Thylias Moss, Franz Wright

=== Elsewhere ===
- Friedenspreis des Deutschen Buchhandels: György Konrád
- Premio Nadal: Alfredo Conde Cid, Los otros días
