= Dear Nobody =

1991 young adult novel by Berlie Doherty

- First edition
- Author: Berlie Doherty
- Cover artist: Sophie Williams
- Language: English
- Genre: Young adult realist novel
- Publisher: Hamish Hamilton
- Publication date: 21 November 1991
- Publication place: United Kingdom
- Media type: Print (hardcover, paperback)
- Pages: 150 pp (first edition)
- ISBN: 0-241-13056-5
- OCLC: 26213419
- LC Class: PZ7.D6947 De 1992

Dear Nobody is a realistic young-adult novel by Berlie Doherty, published by Hamilton in 1991. Set in the northern England city of Sheffield, it features an unplanned teenage pregnancy and tells the story of its effect on the teenagers and their families.

Doherty won the annual Carnegie Medal from the Library Association, recognising the year's best children's book by a British subject. Through 2012 she is one of seven writers with two such honors, having won the 1986 Medal for Granny Was a Buffer Girl. Also set in Sheffield, the earlier novel is a family saga whose point of entry is the Sheffield cutlery industry.

Orchard Books published the first U.S. edition in 1992.

Dear Nobody has been translated into many languages, and the stage version is often performed.

== Plot summary ==
The novel is split between two points of view, a first-person narrative presenting the events as Chris recalls them in retrospect, interspersed with a series of letters from Helen to their unborn child (Nobody), telling her side of the story as she experiences it. The framing sequence is set in autumn as Chris is on the verge of leaving for Newcastle University. A parcel of letters is delivered for him, and he recognizes Helen's handwriting. He begins to read the letters, all addressed to "Dear Nobody", and they remind him of the past nine months. The subsequent chapter headings are all the names of months, beginning with January.

Helen and Chris make love for the first, and only, time. Chris is prompted to ask his father about his marriage breakdown, and decides to get in touch with his mother. Shortly afterwards Helen begins to fear she is pregnant. Chris is disturbed by her distant behaviour. In late February she finally tells him her suspicions, and writes her first letter to "Dear Nobody": "You're only a shadow. You're only a whisper... Leave me alone. Go away. Go away. Please, please, go away."

Later when a pregnancy test proves positive, she tries to abort the pregnancy by going riding, risking her life in a wild gallop, to no avail. In April, Helen's mother finds out, and arranges for her to go to an abortion clinic. However, Helen decides to keep the baby. Mrs Garton refuses to have Chris in the house, but he and Helen continue to see each other. They visit Chris's mother in Carlisle.

In June, Helen and Chris sit their A-levels. After they are over Helen tells Chris she has decided they should break up, believing it is best for both of them. Chris is bewildered, and feels bereft. To get away from all the memories in Sheffield, he goes to France with Tom. He meets a girl called Bryn, but cannot forget Helen.

In September, Helen learns her mother's greatest secret – that she is illegitimate, a great disgrace when she was growing up – and finally begins to understand her. When her contractions start, she has a sudden impulse to send her "Dear Nobody" letters to Chris. Chris finishes reading the letters, realizes the baby is coming and rushes to the hospital, where he meets his newborn daughter, Amy.

== Characters ==
- Christopher Marshall, usually called Chris, a student in his last year of school, planning to study English at Newcastle University
- Helen Garton, sometimes called Nell, Chris's girlfriend, also in her last year at school, and planning to go to music college in Manchester
- Nobody/Amy, their baby

Chris's family

- Alan Marshall, Chris's father, an amateur potter
- Guy Marshall, Chris's younger brother
- Joan, Chris's mother, a professional photographer and climber, who left home when he was 10 to live with Don
- Don, Joan's partner, a keen climber
- Jill, Joan's sister, who runs a riding stable near Sheffield

Helen's family

- Ted Garton, Helen's father, works in the university library and plays in a jazz band
- Alice Garton, Helen's mother, who works in a bank
- Robbie Garton, Helen's younger brother
- Grandad, Alice's stepfather, Helen's grandfather
- Nan, Alice's mother, Helen's grandmother

Friends

- Tom, Chris's best friend
- Ruthlyn, Helen's best friend
- Bryn, a Welsh girl who grows close to Chris but cannot take Helen's place
- Menai, Bryn's friend

== Literary significance and reception ==
Beside the 1991 Carnegie Medal for British children's books, Dear Nobody won the Japanese Sankei Children's Book Award in 1994. It also made shortlists for the Writers Guild of Great Britain Award, the Society of Authors Book of the Year, the Sheffield Award, and the Federation of Children's Book Groups Award. The stage version won the Writers Guild of Great Britain Award in 1992.

Beside English-language editions around the world, Dear Nobody has been translated and published in Bulgaria, Catalonia, Denmark, France, Germany, Greece, Italy, Japan, South Korea, Mexico, the Netherlands, Russia, Slovenia, Spain, Sweden and Wales.

Doherty describes the book as being essentially about love: "It is about two young people who love each other, but it's also about family love, the ways in which love can go wrong, how sometimes it makes us do things that aren't sensible or that hurt people, how sometimes it turns to hate and drives people and families apart".

The emotional intensity of the novel is well attested: "I have never read a book that evokes so vividly how it feels to be a teenager in love" Daily Telegraph; "The aunt, parents, grandparents and siblings bring in various strands of subplot that give the book a satisfying complexity while losing nothing of the intensity of Helen and Chris's developing predicament and the building pressures they're under."

John Murray's essay on the novel's narrative technique focuses on the novel as a literary artefact and discuses how its structure affects the reader.

== Adaptations ==
Dear Nobody has been adapted as a BBC Radio 4 play, a theatre play and a television film for BBC produced by Andy Rowley and starring Sean Maguire and Katie Blake. The playscript has been published by Collins in the Plays Plus series and it has been performed in schools and theatres around the world.

Doherty is enthusiastic about the productions: "I have seen so many interpretations of Chris and Helen and the other actors that I almost can't remember how I imagined my originals to be! I am just endlessly fascinated by the different ways of representing them, and always impressed by the actors' ability to bring the characters to life."

== See also ==
Awards
Preceded by Wolf	Carnegie Medal recipient 1992	Succeeded by Flour Babies
