= La Zerda ou les chants de l'oubli =

- الزردة وأغاني النسيان
- Directed by: Assia Djebar
- Written by: Malek Alloula
- Edited by: Nichole Schlemmer
- Music by: Ahmed Essyad
- Production company: Radiodiffusion Télévision Algérienne (RTA)
- Release date: 1982
- Running time: 59 minutes
- Country: Algeria
- Languages: Arabic, French

La Zerda ou les chants de l'oubli (French pronunciation: [la zeʁda u le ʃɑ̃ də lubli]; lit. 'The Zerda or the Songs of Forgetting') is a 1979 avant-garde experimental documentary film directed by Assia Djebar.

== Synopsis ==
Using archival photographs and film footage shot between 1912 and 1942 in the colonial Maghreb, Djebar composes an experimental film essay in which the soundtrack reveals what the images cannot express alone. The film becomes a historical account that gives life to the forgotten ceremonies (such as the Zerda festival) and repressed lifestyles of indigenous Algerians, while simultaneously questioning the influence of their colonial context on the representations they portray.

== Production ==
The film was directed by Assia Djebar, and experimental in style. The film was one of two documentary films directed by Djebar during her decade-long hiatus from writing, in collaboration with poet Malek Alloula and Moroccan composer Ahmed Essyad.

== Accolades ==
The film won the prize for Best Historical Film at the 1983 Berlin International Film Festival.

== Existing copy ==
The original reels have disappeared, with the only remaining copy restored and digitised by the Arsenal Institute for Film and Video Art in Berlin.
