= Far from Medina =

Book by Assia Djebar

- Author: Assia Djebar
- Original title: Loin de Médine
- Translator: Dorothy S. Blair
- Language: French
- Publisher: Éditions Albin Michel
- Publication date: 1991
- Publication place: Algeria; France
- English publication date: 1994
- Pages: 313
- ISBN: 2-226-05259-3

Far from Medina (French: Loin de Médine) is a 1991 novel by the Algerian writer Assia Djebar. The story revolves around a group of women contemporary with the Islamic prophet Muhammad. An English translation by Dorothy S. Blair was published through Quartet Books in 1994.

== Reception ==
Ziauddin Sardar reviewed the book for The Independent: "Far From Medina is not only a work of extraordinary brilliance, it is also a significant book for Muslims. Its importance lies not so much in the creative synthesis of authentic formative history of Islam with the tools of fiction, but in demonstrating that the same words can lead two equally pious and righteous individuals to opposing actions. Assia Djebar's ijtihad, her new insight, makes the formative words of Islam breathe fresh air while turning the spotlight on hitherto secluded areas of Islamic history."

== See also ==
- 1991 in literature
- Contemporary French literature
