= Red Cap (novel) =

1991 novel by G. Clifton Wisler

- First edition
- Author: G. Clifton Wisler
- Original title: Red Cap
- Language: English
- Genre: Historical Fiction
- Publisher: Lodestar Books
- Publication date: 1991
- Publication place: United States of America
- Media type: Print
- Pages: 160 pp
- ISBN: 0-14-036936-8
- LC Class: PZ7.W78033Re 1991 St 2000

'Red Cap' is a historical fiction book, first published by G. Clifton Wisler in 1991 by Lodestar Books. It was published again in 1994 by Puffin Books.

The book takes placed during the American Civil War in 1862. Ransom J. Powell, a boy who lives in Frostburg, Maryland, decides to join the Union Army against his parents' will. He manages to convince people that he's 15, though he is small for his age of 13. At first, he is excited and proud, but he soon realizes the brutal, bloody horror of war. He is soon taken prisoner during a skirmish, and is taken to Camp Sumter, a Confederate camp. Over time, he watches all of his friends die one by one in the prison, but he keeps hope.

== Characters ==
Ransom J. "R.J" Powell - the main character and narrator of the book. He is small for his age, said to be small for a 12-year-old at the age of 13. He is called Ranny, R. J., and Red Cap intermediately. He becomes a drummer boy and is an icon of hope throughout the entire book.

Johnny Poland - Corporal in Ransom's company. They were captured by the Confederate army together. Johnny became Ransom's protector throughout Ransom's tenure in prison until he dies. His death makes a large impression on Ransom.

Danny Hayes - the other drummer boy in Ransom's company and his best friend for some time. He is known by everyone as a trickster. He dies during a rebel attack at the age of 14.

== Minor characters ==
Oliver "Ollie" Wilson - One of R.J's best friends before he joins the union army. Oliver is against slavery and doesn't get along with the Enos Perkins as much since he is for slavery. He leaves to join the Fourth Maryland, United States forces. He is around R.J's age, but "around half a head taller".

The Perkin Brothers - Enos and Pat Perkins, two boys who grew up in R.J's hometown, who approve of slavery. Enos was around R.J's age, and one of his good friends. Enos is also said to be around Ollie's height. Pat was killed in Culpeper, Virginia, and Enos' head was taken off by a cannonball in Manassas, Virginia.

Mr. and Mrs. Powell - R.J's parents. They don't agree with R. J. joining the war, and stop him at first, before he sneaks out. They have two daughters (Mary and Nancy), a little boy Jamie, R.J, and his father has an apprentice named Johny McDonald.
