= Out Cold (1989 film) =

- Directed by: Malcolm Mowbray
- Written by: Leonard Glasser; George Malko
- Produced by: George G. Braunstein; Ron Hamady
- Starring: John Lithgow; Teri Garr; Randy Quaid; Bruce McGill
- Cinematography: Tony Pierce-Roberts
- Edited by: Dennis M. Hill
- Music by: Michel Colombier
- Distributed by: Hemdale Film Corporation
- Release date: March 3, 1989
- Running time: 91 minutes
- Country: United States
- Language: English
- Box office: $294,266

Out Cold is a 1989 American black comedy film directed by Malcolm Mowbray (who made 1984's A Private Function), and stars John Lithgow, Teri Garr, Bruce McGill, and Randy Quaid.

== Plot ==
The film is set in and around San Pedro, Los Angeles, California - 'the Edward Hopper streets and storefronts create a world where the script plays itself out in all its linear precision.' Sunny (Teri Garr) hires a private detective (Randy Quaid) to trail her husband Ernie (Bruce McGill), whom she believes is lavishing time and money on other women, even though she is shown to be having an affair herself. She wants all the details so she can clean him out in a divorce action. But she is impatient and kills Ernie, seizing a chance to make his business partner, Dave (John Lithgow), think he did it. Ernie and Dave worked as butchers in the Army and when they got out they started a butcher's shop together. Dave has always been in love with Sunny; now he is convinced he has killed Ernie by accidentally locking him in a freezer. Lester Atlas, the private detective, thinks he has pictures of Ernie's lover visiting him at the shop, but has actually photographed Sunny on the night she killed him.

== Critical reaction ==
The film was reviewed favourably by critic Pauline Kael in her final collection of movie reviews, Movie Love: "Teri Garr plays her role with a savage, twinkling joy. Why doesn't her skill get more recognition? This small, disingenuous comedy has been buffed to shine like a jewel; the smoothness of it keeps you giggling."
