= Granny Was a Buffer Girl =

1986 novel by Berlie Doherty

- First edition
- Author: Berlie Doherty
- Language: English
- Genre: Young adult novel
- Publisher: Methuen
- Publication date: 23 October 1986
- Publication place: United Kingdom
- Media type: Print (hardcover & paperback)
- Pages: 128 pp
- ISBN: 0-416-53590-9
- OCLC: 13360671
- LC Class: PZ7.D6947 Gr 1988

Granny Was a Buffer Girl is a realistic young-adult novel by Berlie Doherty, published by Methuen in 1986. It recounts stories of love, loyalty and change in several generations of a Sheffield family from the 1930s to the 1980s, linking them to the changing fortunes of that industrial city. Doherty won the annual Carnegie Medal from the Library Association, recognising the year's best children's book by a British subject.

The first American edition by Orchard Books in 1988 was Doherty's first book published in the U.S.

== Title ==
The title is somewhat misleading, as Granny Dorothy's story is only a small part of the book, but it sets the focus on family history. A buffer girl was a worker in the Sheffield cutlery industry who used the polishing machinery on steel tableware: a hot and dirty job that required protective clothing. Doherty was inspired by the William Rothenstein painting "Sheffield Buffer Girls", depicting two young women in their work clothes.

== Plot summary ==
In the first chapter the narrator is Jess, an 18-year-old girl who is about to leave home to study in France. Her extended family (her father Mike and mother Josie, her grandfathers Jack and Albert, her grandmother Dorothy, her elder brother John and his girlfriend) gathers for a celebration, partly to say goodbye, partly because it is the 27th birthday of Jess and John's eldest brother Danny, who died 10 earlier, when she was 8. Jess is troubled by a secret she has been harbouring. As the characters talk, they promise to reveal their own stories and secrets.

The second chapter is set in the 1930s and concerns Jess's maternal grandparents, Bridie and Jack. Bridie comes from a large Catholic family and Jack's parents are deeply religious Protestants. They fall in love and marry secretly, knowing their prejudiced families will oppose their marriage.

The third chapter centres on Dorothy, Jess's father's mother, the "buffer girl" of the title. It introduces Jess's great aunt Louie, Dorothy's elder sister, who gets Dorothy a job at a local buffing shop. At the Cutlers' Ball, 1931, Dorothy dances with the boss's handsome son, but when the next day he fails to recognize her in her grimy work clothes, she gives up her dream of escaping the narrow streets and grudgingly accepts the matter-of-fact proposal of her boy-next-door sweetheart, Albert, a young steelworker.

In the next two chapters Jess's father Mike appears in his teenage years, as a rebellious would-be teddy boy, awkward around girls and nervous about his imminent National Service. As he leaves on the train he meets Josie, Jack and Bridie's daughter, whom he will marry about three years later.

The sixth chapter is about Danny, Mike and Josie's first child, born disabled - although the exact diagnosis and nature of the disability is never specified - and in a wheelchair from the age of six. By this time, Mike has matured from a rebellious teenager into a stable, loyal and devoted husband and father. On his fifth birthday, Danny asks his parents for a baby sister; although already concerned about the responsibility of caring for Danny, after a discussion with both sets of grandparents, Mike and Josie ultimately decide to take the risk, and John and Jess are born over the next two years.

At Jess's birth the book switches back to first person narrative and from then on concerns Jess's memories of her family: Danny's death at the age of 17, her other brother John with his passion for cycling and his pigeons, her great-aunt Louie's fierce husband Gilbert, and Jess's own first romantic encounter, with an older man who unknown to her is married.

The book ends as Jess departs for France, confident about the challenge of changing from a child to an independent adult after hearing her family's stories.

== Awards ==
Beside the 1986 Carnegie Medal for British children's books, Granny Was a Buffer Girl was a runner up in the Boston Globe-Horn Book awards in 1988.

== Adaptations ==
Granny was adapted for BBC Radio by the author in 1990 and published as a play in 2003.

== See also ==
Awards
Preceded by Storm	Carnegie Medal recipient 1986	Succeeded by The Ghost Drum
