= Movie Love =

- Author: Pauline Kael
- Language: English
- Genre: Film Critique
- Publisher: E. P. Dutton
- Publication date: 1991

Movie Love: Complete Reviews 1988–1991 (1991) is the 11th and last collection of film reviews by the critic Pauline Kael and covers the period from October 1988 to March 1991, when she chose to retire from her regular film reviewing duties at The New Yorker. In the "Author's Note" that begins the anthology, Kael writes that this period had "not been a time of great moviemaking fervor", but "what has been sustaining is that there is so much to love in movies besides great moviemaking."

She reviews 85 films in this final collection. She gives rich praise to directors and performers she admires - in this collection for example, Pedro Almodóvar; 'Generalissimo Francisco Franco kept the lid on Spain for 36 years; he died in 1975 and Almodóvar is part of what jumped out of the box. The most original pop writer-director of the 1980s; he's Jean-Luc Godard with a human face - a happy face.' And Chet Baker in Let's Get Lost; " He's singing a torch song after the flame is gone; he's selling the romance of burnout." Perhaps pre-eminently in this collection she praises Brian De Palma's Casualties of War; "Some movies - La Grande Illusion, and Shoeshine come to mind, - can affect us in more direct, emotional ways than simple entertainment movies. They have more imagination, more poetry, more intensity than the usual fare; they have themes, and a vision. Casualties of War has this kind of purity." And she's cool to what she regards as second rate - Field of Dreams, for example, - 'That the film is sincere doesn't mean it's not manipulative.' Or The Rainbow: "The ads for The Rainbow feature a banner line, 'Ken Russell is the purest interpreter D. H. Lawrence could have hoped for.' In his worst nightmare."

The films she recommends include; Patty Hearst, Women on the Verge of a Nervous Breakdown, True Believer, Scrooged, The Dressmaker, Dangerous Liaisons, Out Cold, Let's Get Lost, Say Anything..., Casualties of War, Ghostbusters II, Batman, The Fabulous Baker Boys, My Left Foot, Enemies, The Tall Guy, The Grifters, Vincent & Theo, Everybody Wins, L.A. Story.

Notably absent from this collection of reviews are the longer general essays on the films that Kael had written and included in past anthologies.

This book is out-of-print in the United States, but is still published by Marion Boyars Publishers of the United Kingdom.

== Movies reviewed ==
- Bird
- Gorillas in the Mist
- Patty Hearst
- Another Woman
- Punchline
- Madame Sousatzka
- Women on the Verge of a Nervous Breakdown
- Things Change
- A Cry in the Dark
- The Good Mother
- Scrooged
- High Spirits
- The Dressmaker
- Tequila Sunrise
- Mississippi Burning
- Dangerous Liaisons
- Working Girl
- The Accidental Tourist
- Beaches
- Dirty Rotten Scoundrels
- Rain Man
- True Believer
- High Hopes
- Three Fugitives
- Out Cold
- Parents
- Cousins
- New York Stories
- The Adventures of Baron Munchausen
- The Dream Team
- Crusoe
- Heathers
- Let's Get Lost
- Field of Dreams
- Scandal
- Say Anything
- The Rainbow
- Miss Firecracker
- Indiana Jones and the Last Crusade
- Vampire's Kiss
- Dead Poets Society
- Batman
- Ghostbusters II
- Casualties of War
- My Left Foot
- Penn & Teller Get Killed
- A Dry White Season
- The Fabulous Baker Boys
- Breaking In
- Johnny Handsome
- Drugstore Cowboy
- Crimes and Misdemeanors
- Dad
- Fat Man and Little Boy
- The Bear
- Henry V
- Valmont
- Blaze
- Back to the Future Part II
- The Little Mermaid
- Enemies
- Driving Miss Daisy
- Music Box
- Roger & Me
- Always
- Born on the Fourth of July
- Glory
- Internal Affairs
- GoodFellas
- The Tall Guy
- Postcards from the Edge
- Pacific Heights
- Avalon
- The Grifters
- Reversal of Fortune
- Vincent & Theo
- Dances with Wolves
- Edward Scissorhands
- The Sheltering Sky
- Everybody Wins
- The Godfather Part III
- The Bonfire of the Vanities
- Awakenings
- Sleeping with the Enemy
- L.A. Story
