= Gojiro =

1991 book by Mark Jacobson

- First edition
- Author: Mark Jacobson
- Cover artist: Chip Kidd
- Language: English
- Genre: Science fiction novel
- Publisher: Atlantic Monthly Press
- Publication date: February 1991
- Publication place: United States
- Media type: Print (Hardback & Paperback); Electronic (e-book)
- Pages: 356 (paperback edition)
- ISBN: 0-87113-396-2 (first edition, hardback)
- OCLC: 22508073
- Dewey Decimal: 813/.54 20
- LC Class: PS3560.A27 G65 1991

Gojiro is the 1991 debut novel by former Esquire columnist Mark Jacobson. It reinterprets the Godzilla film series from the perspective of the daikaiju—not a fictional creature depicted on-screen via suitmation, but an irradiated varanid-turned B-movie star named Gojiro (an homage to Gojira, the original native proper name in Japanese for Godzilla). Gojiro, a freak mutation with a cynical worldview, suffers the pain of solitude as well as several maladies experienced by entertainers, including drug abuse and suicidal tendencies. The story revolves around his adventures with human friend Komodo, a scientific genius scarred as a child by the atomic bombing of Hiroshima, as they attempt to fulfill their "Triple Ring Promise" to bring about world peace. The odyssey takes them from their home on Radioactive Island—also home to several children, called Atoms, suffering from radiation sickness—to several locations in Hollywood and the Trinity site in New Mexico.

The novel is often compared to John Gardner's earlier novel Grendel, a retelling of the Beowulf epic through the eyes of the monster.

== Plot summary ==
The earliest event is the striking of a comet into the earth 65 million years ago, at the Encrucijada Valley site as the first nuclear test later occurs. A small lizard witnesses and survives this event, and carries on his line. This lizard is revered as the heroic Varanidid by Gojiro's lizard homeland, though they forget what exactly he did. He is also the precursor of the reptilian creator-beast revered by the dying Monongae clan that lived in the same location before the nuclear tests occurred. The remains of the dead dinosaurs form fossil fuels which pool under the valley.

Much later, in the 19th century, Joseph Prometheus Brooks is born to a large middle American family, his father a severe and religious man. Joseph's mother recognizes his genius and manages to have him sent away at a very young age to the university of Göttingen in Germany, where he meets his future collaborator in nuclear physics, Victor Stiller. When he returns home on holiday, he finds that his father has burned the entire rest of the family to death, along with their home, believing that existence is an affront to God. Some time later, the last few members of the Monongae clan send supplications of help to the beast who lives inside the Earth to help them, and charge the youngest member, Nelson Monongae with reawakening him. That same night, he encounters Joseph Brooks' future wife Leona, who soon has visions of past and future events, including the striking of the comet, and an incomplete vision of an adult Joseph Brooks holding an object and looking at something. She travels to Germany, where she finds Joseph playing clarinet in and underground jazz club, having become disaffected by the university. They marry and travel to the United States, along with Victor Stiller, when WWII breaks out, Joseph and Victor becoming the premier nuclear scientists of the American war effort. Leona becomes pregnant nine months before the first nuclear test, a couple of years before 1945. Joseph intends the nuclear test to cause such vast destruction that it calls the attention of the creator of the world to Earth. Leona and Joseph's daughter, Sheila Brooks, is born on the day of the test, and Leona dies, having come too close to the blastwave in an attempt to witness God's manifestation.

A couple years later, another site for a second test is chosen, the homeland of the lizard Gojiro. He is a young lizard uninitiated into adulthood and the mysteries of lizard philosophy, which involves bodily immersion in a pool of oil (the Black Spot) that bubbles to the surface. Immediately before he feels the compulsion to go to the black spot, he witnesses Victor, Joseph and a general surveying the spot and arguing, as well as the young Sheila in the window of the plane they arrived on. Gojiro is held captive by Joseph's baleful gaze at the same moment he feels the compulsion to go the Black Spot, and goes to it when Joseph breaks the staredown. Gojiro dawdles before the Spot, and just as he makes the resolution to jump, he is hit by the full force of the nuclear explosion test, preventing his immersion into full lizard-hood, and leading into his mutation into a 500 foot tall intelligent lizard, with the ability to breathe radioactive energy beams, incredible regenerative ability, and to involuntarily receive psychic messages and transport his consciousness into other bodies, due to his super-advanced "Quadcameral" brain, an advancement on the human three layer brain. He somehow floats to Radioactive Island, an unmapped island covered by a permanent dome of thick cloud, to which other lost souls affected by nuclear radiation will eventually float as well, along with entire pieces of land and the cultural/technological "flotjet" of the modern era.

Around the same time as the nuclear tests were occurring, a Japanese scientist in Hiroshima was attempting to invent a radio with which the thoughts of animals could be heard. One year exactly before the nuclear bombing, his son, Yukio Komodo, is born. On Komodo's first birthday, the nuclear bombing of Hiroshima occurs. Two versions of this event are related. In the first version told at the opening of the novel, Komodo has a premonition of the incoming attack, and his parents die in the blast. Wandering through the blasted cityscape, he sends a supplication to Gojiro, who appears before him. In the other, his father has the premonition, and forces Komodo and the radio deep into a hole. The heat of the blast causes the radio to burn three concentric rings into his chest above his heart, which Komodo later takes to be the emblem of his bond with Gojiro. Mostly unharmed by the blast, he is nonetheless stunned into a catatonic state in which he is aware of the outside world but does not move. He becomes a celebrity after the war, meeting many famous people, including Victor Stiller. He is diligently nursed by a black soldier, Walter Crenshaw, who also keeps safe the radio he was found with. When Komodo is 10 years old, he receives a psychic supplication from Gojiro on Radioactive Island, and offers to be his friend. This awakens him from his coma, and Walter helps Komodo to escape on a fishing boat. Walter tries and fails to give the radio to Komodo as he escapes, but he keeps it safe from American authorities, entrusting it to his wife, never revealing it or Komodo's location. Komodo's death is then faked. At around the same time, Joseph Brooks drives around America with his daughter Sheila on the lam, eventually being captured, his death also being faked, and he is taken back to the Encrucijada, where he lives unknown to Sheila, and daily assumes the pose his wife had painted of him.

Komodo arrives on Radioactive island, where he quickly becomes friends with Gojiro. Gojiro remembers this time as the highlight of his life, and they pledge to be together forever. Gojiro begins to expound philosophic dialogues, inspired by a muse he names "Budd Hazard", which act as an extension and elaboration of the philosophy of the lizards, centred around the processes of change, identity and evolution. Gojiro's obsessive interest in this philosophy leads him to force Komodo to alter their promise, to re-centre it around the creation of a new "Beam and Bunch", Hazard's conceptual analogue of a species/nation. The failure of this new promise is one of the contributing factors to Gojiro's later regret and depression. After this new promise is made, two new people arrive on the island, the child Shig and the teenage Kishi, both Japanese, the first of the "atoms", people affected by nuclear radiation, to arrive on the island. Komodo falls in love with Kishi, impregnating her and driving a wedge between him and Gojiro. When Komodo and Kishi attempt to leave the island, Gojiro enters a hallucinatory state of mad rage, and inadvertently kills Kishi when his thrashing causes her to fall from the boat and drown, her daughter Ebi being born at that exact instant. This event leads Shig to hate Gojiro, and causes Gojiro to become suicidally hateful of himself, but Komodo forgives his Gojiro.

Other atoms begin arriving, and Komodo assumes a fatherly role toward them. Unlike Gojiro and Komodo's hopes of forming a new Beam with the atoms, the atoms are stupid, unruly and destructive, with the except of Shig and Ebi. Various attempts to form a bond between them and Gojiro end in failure, including a series of monster movies starring Gojiro in which the atoms appear as extras. Shig steals these recordings and releases them as feature films, to Gojiro's dismay when he finds them playing on TV. Gojiro's extreme popularity causes his fans to form a cult-like attachment to him, further fed by Shig feeding the outside world a bastardized version of Budd's philosophy. This culminates when Shig steals the design of a crystal radio Komodo has made in his lab (having become a mad scientist in the meantime), and sells them to Gojiro's fans, imploring them to use them to send constant supplications to Gojiro, begging for "the 90 series (the capstone of Hazard's philosophy) and the PA (Gojiro's personal appearance before his fans). Through the crystal radios, Gojiro psychically receives every one of these supplications from across the world, and his mind is transported into their bodies, often experiencing great physical and psychic pain, as many of his fans are destitute and desperate. Komodo builds a radio tower to receive the supplications instead of Gojiro, the supplications killing the ground around the tower. Gojiro wanders near the tower and accidentally touches it, receiving the supplication of Billy Snickman, a feral American child who ardently watches Gojiro's movies from outside drive-in theatres. Billy merely asks Gojiro who he is, to which he inexplicably responds "Bridger of Gaps, Linker of Lines, Nexus of Beam and Bunch, Defender of the Evoloo". After this, Gojiro begs Komodo to sever whatever neural link in his brain allows the supplications to enter, which Komodo reluctantly does. They discover the Quadcameral brain does not possess Gojiro's regenerative powers, and the removal of the link is permanent. The vulnerability of his brain forms the basis of Gojiro's future suicide attempts. His final attempt, which he nearly succeeds at, causes Komodo to threaten double suicide if Gojiro succeeds, stopping Gojiro. He and Komodo agree to a final amendment to the Triple Ring Promise: if they fail to fulfill the promise in one year, Gojiro must be allowed to kill himself and Komodo to respect that and continue living.

Around the same timespan, Sheila is tormented by visions centring around her father on the Encrucijada. Due to her extreme psychotherapy, she is not directly aware of this, and instead her visions are transmuted into apocalyptic nightmares that her husband Billy Zeber has turned into award-winning movies, making Sheila rich and famous. He is unable to alleviate her psychic pain however, and at a crisis point sends a letter of supplication to Radioactive Island, begging Gojiro to come to America and make a movie, Gojira and Joseph Brooks in the Valley of Decision, addressing Gojiro by the titles he responded to Billy's question. Gojiro and Komodo secretly make their way to America, Komodo shrinking Gojiro to the size of a normal lizard using a technology variously described as a shrinking pill, ray, injection or potion. Komodo meets Sheila and immediately feels a deep connection to her, but she refuses to acknowledge the plea she sent. Komodo finds that Shig got wind of their departure and managed to transport the atoms and the hyper-fertile biome of Radioactive Island to a peculiar mansion in California. Shig acts as Komodo and Gojiro's combined chauffeur, bodyguard, lawyer and spokesman, directing their activities from behind the scenes. Komodo meets figures in Hollywood, including the aged Victor Stiller. He also tries to meet Walter Crenshaw, but finds that he is dead, and his family suspect him of being an agent of the American government. Komodo convinces Gojiro to travel to the Encrucijada valley, hoping to find the source of Sheila's visions. Along the way, Gojiro encounters Billy and shies away from him, consumed by self-loathing. Komodo and Gojiro make it to the Valley, where Shig houses them in a vast underground chamber bored out by nuclear test explosions. On TV screens they see the image of Joseph Brooks that his wife had painted, but on live-feed TV screens. Komodo attempts to communicate with him but fails, and returns to Sheila to tell her her father is still alive. Gojiro remains behind, where he inexplicably begins to have a series of visions reminiscent of the 90 series supplications, where he experiences past events from the perspective of the Varanidid, and his own birth. He investigates the shack Joseph lives in, and finds a stack of paintings depicting the visions he just received, as well as the blackboard containing the equation Joseph solved to create the atomic bomb, and receives a vision of Nelson and Leona's meeting. During his spying, Victor and the general visit Joseph, attempting to communicate him, and both are briefly subject to the vision that keeps Joseph glued to the Encrucijada. Joseph says that the nuclear bomb was a failure, as it was unable to call God's attention.

At the same time, Komodo experiences a whirlwind of events as he attempts to take Sheila to the Encrucijada, but is waylaid by Victors government goons. Shig saves Komodo and Sheila by luring the paparazzi to them, then Komodo returns to the mansion to bury Ebi, who died soon after telling Sheila she wished that Sheila were her mother. Komodo then has a clandestine meeting with Billy Zeber, Sheila's husband, who charges Komodo with protecting her, disappearing into the night. Komodo is again captured by Victor, but is saved again by Shig and the atoms, as well as Walter Crenshaw's son.

Gojiro, still spying on Victor, has a vision of Victor's childhood, and witnesses Victor pick up the small comic book explaining Gojiro's true origin that Komodo had attempted to give to Victor, which inspires him to make a new equation on the blackboard. Gojiro returns to the cave and scrawls it on the wall, then sees on TV that the mansion has been ransacked. Komodo arrives and attempts to complete Joseph's work, arriving at a method to compress and disperse into nothingness anything at all, which Joseph hopes will be enough to draw God' attention, and Komodo and Gojiro fear will cause an "All-Inclusive Crisis of the Evoloo", a moment of such great chaos and change that the universe will be unable to surmount it and continue. Shig delivers the box Walter had been keeping secret, containing the Komodo's father's radio. Komodo and Gojiro simultaneously experience Komodo's lost childhood memories, as well as his and Gojiro's moments of birth. Komodo completes Victor's work, demonstrating it by annihilating some of his beloved pet birds. Gojiro is enraged at Komodo, and cannot understand Komodo's optimism at the situation. Sheila arrives and Komodo goes out to her. Gojiro takes a golden arsenic pill, but is sucked inside of it in accordance with Komodo's completed equation, where his consciousness disperses.

Komodo and Leona meet the now centenarian Nelson Monongae, dressed as the Varanidid, who gives them a small capsule of oil. Komodo and Sheila return to the cave, where Komodo realises Gojiro has been sucked into the pill, and using devices capable of reading Gojiro's Quadcameral brainwaves, determines that whatever Beamic force had sent Gojiro's consciousness into the past was now sustaining only the single neural connection that once received the 90 series supplications, barely keeping him alive. They see Victor Stiller on TV tapping the oil under the Encrucijada, which they discern is the lifeblood of the Beam keeping Gojiro alive. The atoms blow up the derrick, and Sheila and Komodo immerse the pill in the capsule of oil, completing Gojiro's thwarted initiation into full lizardhood. Komodo links Sheila, himself (realising he is also Quadcameral) and the pill, so that Sheila's supplication can recall him from nothingness. Gojiro's dispersed consciousness experiences Sheila's birth (and witnesses Leona's death), and Sheila and Komodo's psychic union, then hears her supplication. He finds the will to live and reassembles his body, reappearing before Victor, who has an orb which is the completion of his plan to destroy all of creation. Victor tosses the orb, which Gojiro catches in his third eye, the window to the Quadcameral. The entire earth is sucked inside of Gojiro's brain, leaving him alone in space. He exhorts the world to reform itself, which it does, nobody on earth being aware of what has happened. Gojiro, Sheila and Komodo return to Radioactive Island, where Gojiro asks Komodo permission to die despite the fulfilment of the Triple Ring Promise, thinking that he is dying as he loses his regenerative powers. As they prepare Gojiro's funeral raft, they see Gojiro's long-lost homeland arrive on Radioactive Island, and rather than dying, he instead becomes the fully initiated adult lizard he failed to become as a child. Fourteen years later, Komodo leave a letter at Gojiro's homeland, telling him of his and Sheila's happy life together, and reminiscing about the time he and Gojiro spent together.

== Editions ==
- ISBN 0-87113-396-2 (hardcover, Pub Group West, 1991)
- ISBN 0-553-29743-0 (paperback, Bantam Books, 1993)
- ISBN 0-8021-3539-0 (paperback, Pub Group West, 1998)
- ISBN 1-930815-35-2 (e-book, 2000)
