= Berlie Doherty =

English children's writer (born 1943)

Berlie Doherty (born 6 November 1943) is an English novelist, poet, playwright and screenwriter. She is best known for children's books, for which she has twice won the Carnegie Medal. She has also written novels for adults, plays for theatre and radio, television series and libretti for children's opera.

== Education and early career ==
Born in Knotty Ash in Liverpool in 1943 to Walter Hollingsworth, Doherty was the youngest of three children. All four grandparents had died before she was born, which she later called "a great deprivation". Aged four, she moved to Hoylake, the setting of several of her early books. She was encouraged to write by her father, from whom she later wrote that she had "inherited stories". A railway clerk by trade, he was also a keen writer whose poetry had been published in the local newspaper. Doherty soon followed suit, with her poetry and stories appearing on the children's pages of the Liverpool Echo and Hoylake News and Advertiser from age five. Her first submitted stories and poems were typed by her father, and he nourished her dream to be a writer, as she recalled in 2004: "I cherished the dream, but it was my father who nourished it. He used to tell me bedtime stories every night, and very often we would make them up together, tossing the ideas backwards and forwards like a bright ball. Then he would drop the ball—'I've had enough now', he would say, '... you can finish that for yourself.'"

Berlie attended Upton Hall Convent School. She read English at the University of Durham (1965), and then studied social science at the University of Liverpool. In 1978, after starting a family, she gained a postgraduate certificate in education at the University of Sheffield. A lesson in creative writing as part of the certificate led to a short story about the convent school; broadcast on local radio, it was to form the nucleus of Doherty's first adult novel, Requiem.

After employment as a social worker and teacher, Doherty spent two years writing and producing schools programmes for BBC Radio Sheffield. Several of the series generated later publications: How Green You Are: The Making of Fingers Finnigan; Children of Winter; Tilly Minst Tales: Granny was a Buffer Girl and White Peak Farm...

== Career as a writer ==
Doherty wrote for the newspaper children's pages from age five until she lost eligibility when she turned fourteen. She returned seriously to writing when her children had entered school, more than twenty years later. Her first book was How Green You Are!, a novel published in 1982 by Methuen in its Pied Piper series, with illustrations by Elaine McGregor Turney. Next year she became a full-time writer.

White Peak Farm (1984) was Doherty's third book and her first for older readers, featuring life on a contemporary family farm and its recent changes. One reviewer called it autobiographical but her only farm experience had been work for one of the Sheffield schools radio series, when she had interviewed farm teenagers in Derbyshire, where she set the novel. (Later she moved into a 300-year-old farm cottage in the Derbyshire Peak District, in the midst of farming but not as a farmer.)

She has written over sixty novels and picture books for children and young adults. According to Philip Pullman, "Doherty's strength has always been her emotional honesty." Her books encompass multiple genres. Some draw on her experience as a social worker to dramatise contemporary issues, including teenage pregnancy in Dear Nobody (1991), adoption in The Snake-Stone (1995), and African AIDS orphans and child trafficking in her latest novel, Abela: The Girl Who Saw Lions (2007). A conservationist, her story book Tilly Mint and the Dodo (1988) centres on the threat of species extinction. Spellhorn (1989) uses a fantasy setting to explore the experience of blindness. Several of her works have historical settings, such as Street Child (1993), which is set in 1860s London and Treason, set in Henry VIII's reign. Some of them are based on Doherty's own family history; Granny Was a Buffer Girl (1986) includes the story of her parents' marriage, while The Sailing Ship Tree (1998) draws on the lives of her father and grandfather. She had been deprived of living grandparents as living links to her own "distant past"; she "re-created" both her mother's parents in Granny and re-created her father's father in Sailing-Ship.

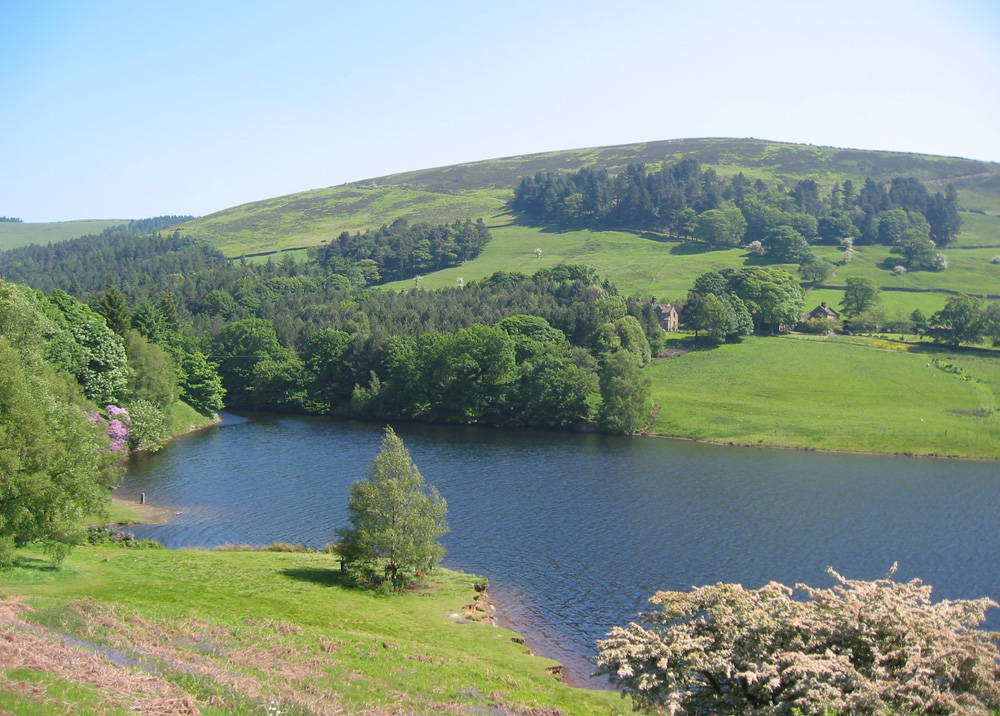
Ladybower Reservoir, inspiration for Deep Secret

Doherty's works often have a strong sense of place. She has stated that she is inspired by landscape and admires Thomas Hardy for "the sense of people within a landscape" that his novels convey, and She now lives in Edale, Derbyshire in the Dark Peak, and many of her books like 'Jeannie of White Peak Farm', are set in the Peak District. Children of Winter (1985) is loosely based on the story of the plague village of Eyam, and the drowning of the villages of Derwent and Ashopton by the Ladybower Reservoir is recounted in Deep Secret (2004). The fantasy picture book Blue John (2003) was inspired by the Blue John Cavern at Castleton. A ghost story, The Haunted Hills was inspired by a local legend, Lost Lad, which gave name to one of the rocky outcrops on Derwent Edge close to Berlie's home.

Doherty often works with children and teenagers when developing her novels, having "a conviction that children are the experts and I can always learn from them." She read her first novel, How Green You Are!, to one of her classes while working as a teacher in Sheffield; Tough Luck (1987) was written as part of a writer's residency at a Doncaster school; and her research for Spellhorn included extensive work with a group of blind children from a school in Sheffield.

Though best known as a writer for children, Doherty has also written two novels for adults, Requiem (1991) and The Vinegar Jar (1994). On the differences between writing for children and adults, she has said, "Children need a good strong storyline. But they need sensitive writing and must be able to relate to the characters and the plot."

=== Poetry ===
Berlie Doherty's poetry collection Walking on Air was published in 1993 and her poems have also appeared in several anthologies. She edited a collection of "story poems", The Forsaken Merman and other story poems (1998). Her poem "Here lies a city's heart ...", a Sheffield Arts commission, has been engraved on a Sheffield pedestrian shopping street, since transferred to a bench in the same area.

=== Drama ===
Doherty has written many plays for radio, which she describes as "a wonderful medium to write for, inviting as it does both writer and listener to use their imaginations, to 'see' with their mind's eye." She has also written several plays for the theatre, including both adaptations and original works. She has adapted two of her novels for television, White Peak Farm for BBC1 (1988) and Children of Winter for Channel 4 (1994). She also wrote the 2001 series Zzaap and the Word Master about two children trapped in cyberspace, broadcast on BBC2 as part of the Look and Read schools programming.

=== Works associated with music ===
Several of Doherty's works are intended to be accompanied by music. She has written the libretti for three children's operas. Daughter of the Sea was adapted from her novel of the same name, and was first performed at Sheffield Crucible Theatre, musicians including the Lindsay String Quartet in 2004, with music composed by Richard Chew. The Magician's Cat (2004) was commissioned by the Welsh National Opera and features music by Julian Philips, composer in residence at Glyndebourne. Her most recent libretto, for the chamber opera Wild Cat, was also commissioned by the Welsh National Opera as part of the trilogy 'Land, Sea, Sky' on the theme of conservation, and was first performed in May 2007 by the WNO Singing Club (a youth group), directed by Nik Ashton. The libretto was partly translated into Welsh by poet Menna Elfyn, and the music was also composed by Philips.

Three commissions from the Lindsay Quartet were written to be read over live performances of their music. The Midnight Man was inspired by Debussy's Quartet in G minor, Blue John by Smetana's string quartet From My Life, and The Spell of the Toadman by Janáček's string quartet Kreutzer Sonata. The Midnight Man and Blue John were later published as picture books. Doherty's daughter, Sally, has also set The Midnight Man for spoken and singing voices, flute, clarinet, cello and harp.

== Awards ==
Doherty won the annual Carnegie Medal from the Library Association, recognising the year's best children's book by a British subject, both for Granny Was a Buffer Girl (Methuen, 1986) and for Dear Nobody (Hamilton, 1991). She was also a highly commended runner-up (Note: Today there are usually eight books on the Carnegie shortlist. CCSU lists 32 "Highly Commended" runners up from 1966 to 2002 but only three before 1979 when the distinction became approximately annual. From 1979 there were 29 "HC" books in 24 years including Doherty and one other in 1994. • No one has won three Carnegies. Among the seven authors with two Medals, six were active during 1966–2002 and all wrote at least one Highly Commended runner up, led by Anne Fine with three and Robert Westall with two.) for Willa and Old Miss Annie (1994). No one has won three Carnegies.

Granny was a Buffer Girl was also a runner up for the 1988 Boston Globe–Horn Book Award. Dear Nobody also won a 1994 Sankei Award in its Japanese edition and a 1991 Writers' Guild Award in its adaptation. The Guardian named it one of five "Classics for young teens" that were in print October 2001.

Other awards include a Writers' Guild Award for Daughter of the Sea in 1997.

In 2002, the University of Derby awarded Doherty an honorary doctorate.

White Peak Farm won the 2004 Phoenix Award from the Children's Literature Association as the best English-language children's book that did not a major award when it was originally published twenty years earlier. The Phoenix Award is named for the mythical bird phoenix, which is reborn from its ashes, to suggest the book's rise from obscurity. According to WorldCat it is her third most widely held work in libraries, after Granny and Dear Nobody.

== Personal life ==
Doherty lives with singer and songwriter Luis Jara. Her two daughters have both worked in collaboration with her: Janna Doherty illustrated Walking on Air and Tilly Mint and the Dodo; Sally set Midnight Man and Daughter of the Sea to music.

== Works ==
=== Novels for children and young adults ===
- How Green You Are! (Methuen, 1982)
- The Making of Fingers Finnigan (1983)
- White Peak Farm (1984; adapted for television 1988); later re-titled Jeannie of White Peak Farm at Doherty's request
- Children of Winter (1985; adapted for television 1994)
- Granny Was a Buffer Girl (1986; adapted for radio 2002/2003)
- Tough Luck (1987)
- Spellhorn (1989)
- Dear Nobody (1991; adapted for radio 1993 and television 1997)
- Street Child (1993; adapted for radio 2000 and television)
- The Snake-Stone (1995; adapted for radio 2005)
- Daughter of the Sea (1996; libretto 2004)
- The Sailing Ship Tree (1998)
- The Snow Queen (1998; adapted from Hans Christian Andersen)
- Holly Starcross (2001)
- Deep Secret (2004)
- Abela: The Girl Who Saw Lions (2007)
- A Beautiful Place for a Murder (2008)
- Treason (2011)
- The Company of Ghosts (2013)
- Far from Home: The Sisters of Street Child (2015)

=== Picture books, story books and short story collections ===
- Tilly Mint Tales (1984)
- Tilly Mint and the Dodo (1988)
- Paddiwak and Cosy (1988)
- Snowy (1992)
- Old Father Christmas (1993; retelling of story by Juliana Horatia Ewing)
- Willa and Old Miss Annie (1994)
- The Magical Bicycle (1995)
- The Golden Bird (1995)
- Our Field (1996; retelling of story by Juliana Horatia Ewing)
- Running on Ice (1997)
- Bella's Den (1997)
- Tales of Wonder and Magic (edited; 1997)
- The Midnight Man (1998)
- The Famous Adventures of Jack (2000)
- Fairy Tales (2000)
- Zzaap and the Word Master (2001; accompanied by television series)
- The Nutcracker (2002)
- Coconut Comes to School (2002)
- Tricky Nelly's Birthday Treat (2003)
- Blue John (2003)
- The Starburster (2004)
- Jinnie Ghost (2005)
- The Humming Machine (2006)
- The Winspinner (2008)
- Peak Dale Farm: A Calf Called Valentine (2009)
- Peak Dale Farm: Valentine's Day (2009)
- The Three Princes (2011)
- Wild Cat (2012)
- Joe and the Dragonosaurus (2015)

=== Poetry collections ===
- Walking on Air (1993)
- Big Bulgy Fat Black Slugs (1993; with Joy Cowley and June Melser)
- The Forsaken Merman and Other Story Poems (edited; 1998)
- Kieran

=== Novels for adults ===
- Requiem (1991; expanded from radio play of 1982)
- The Vinegar Jar (1994)

=== Selected plays*, radio plays ===
- The Drowned Village (1980)
- Unlucky for Some (1980)
- Home (1982)
- A Case for Probation (1983)
- Sacrifice (1985)
- Return to the Ebro (1986; adapted as a radio play as There's a Valley in Spain, 1990)*
- The Sleeping Beauty (1993)*

=== Libretti for children's opera ===
- Daughter of the Sea (2004)
- The Magician's Cat (2004), with music by Julian Philips
- Wildcat (2007), with music by Julian Philips
