= Mode (novel series) =

Quartet of novels by Piers Anthony

The Mode series is a quartet of novels by Piers Anthony. Like many of Anthony's other fictional works, it explores many themes and ideas. This series has themes of violence, the abuse of power, sexism and male dominance, gender roles, the environment, integrity and personal honor, sapient animal life, parallel and alternative evolution, space travel, alternate dimensions, paradox, obscure concepts in physics and mathematics, sexual assault and abuse, child and adolescent sexuality, and suicide.

Though initially marketed as fantasy, the Mode series is similar to the Incarnations of Immortality and the Apprentice Adept series, blending fantasy and science fiction.

== Mode theory ==
Mode, in the series, is another word for "reality" or "universe." The philosophy is heavily inspired by eastern philosophies. The Virtual Mode is like a three-dimensional plane that cuts across many realities. It requires five points, represented both by anchor modes and anchor persons, to hold it in place. When someone hears the call of the Virtual Mode, he may reach out with his mind and set his anchor point, thereby becoming an anchor person. When two or more persons act in tandem to attach the Virtual Mode, both will become anchors. Only anchor persons may travel freely on the Virtual Mode; other travelers must remain in contact with the anchors lest they become lost in one of the non-anchor modes. In addition, only objects from anchor modes may be transported on the Virtual Mode; any other materials will remain in their mode of origin. Once the anchor point is fixed, mode travelers may step in and out of the Virtual Mode at that point, thereby being able to interact fully in the anchor reality. Anchor persons may only travel ten feet across non-anchor modes before crossing the border into the next reality. Though each mode is only ten feet deep, it is infinitely wide; anchor persons may travel as far as they like to the side as long as they don't cross the border. Each reality is like an individual sheet of mica, and when each individual plane is placed next to others, together they form the whole Virtual Mode. Each mode has its own rules which determine which aspects of science and magic will work there.

Only the death or purposeful release of an anchor person can free an anchor point. When that happens, the Virtual Mode is unstable until another person invokes their anchor. Few people are able to sense the Virtual Mode; only those who can may become anchor persons. In the series, those who invoke the Virtual Mode are typically individuals who have some great need for change in, or escape from, their current situation that only access to the Virtual Mode will provide. In addition, the Chip that invokes the Virtual Mode has different settings which determine the realities that will be included in any given Virtual Mode. Though it can be set to include only modes populated by human beings, the Virtual Mode in the novels is set instead to include sapience of any type, including non-living beings such as machines.

== Novels ==
Virtual Mode
- Author: Piers Anthony
- Cover artist: Daniel R. Horne
- Language: English
- Series: Mode
- Genre: Fantasy
- Publisher: Ace/Putnam
- Publication date: February 1991
- Publication place: United States
- Media type: Print (Hardcover and Paperback)
- Pages: 323 (paperback edition)
- ISBN: 978-0-441-86503-1 (paperback edition)
- OCLC: 24895560
- Followed by: Fractal Mode

=== Virtual Mode ===
Colene, who appears to be bright and popular at school, secretly flirts with suicide and cutting herself for emotional release. Her death wish prompts her to approach a strange man that she finds in a ditch on her way home from school, and her relationship with Darius begins.

Darius and Colene rapidly fall in love, but he regretfully leaves her when she cannot bring herself to accept that he is from a magical reality. After he vanishes before her eyes, Colene realizes he was telling the truth, and, in despair, she prepares to commit suicide. Back in his own mode, Darius realizes that he loves Colene too much to give her up. He therefore uses a magical device called the Chip to create a Virtual Mode so he can travel back to Colene.

Colene quickly seizes the opportunity to become an anchor person and sets out along her side of the Virtual Mode. On her way, she befriends Seqiro, a telepathic stallion and, to Colene's joy and surprise, another anchor. As Sequiro joins her in traveling the Virtual Mode, she opens up to him and reveals the source of her depressive and suicidal nature; she had been raped at a party by several older boys but did not report the incident out of fear of humiliation and because she had become drunk during the party. The two make rapid progress towards Darius' mode until they are unexpectedly trapped in DoOon, home mode of the emperor Ddwng, who is the anchor for his world. Forced to suffer captivity thinly veiled as hospitality, Colene and Seqiro must wait for Darius to arrive.

Meanwhile, Darius has encountered another anchor—Provos, a strange older woman, while traveling toward Colene. Forgetful of the past but able to remember the future, Provos helps him avoid or defeat many hazards on the Virtual Mode. Eventually, they reach a series of beacons, which they follow to DoOon.

Darius and Colene reunite, but are almost immediately separated. Ddwng, who wants to coerce Darius into giving him the Chip, assesses his personality by sending him on a mission to another planet. Though Darius is reluctant to accede to the emperor's request, Ddwng threatens Colene and Darius finally agrees.

Though Darius considers his promise binding, Colene prompts Seqiro to use his telepathy to trick Ddwng into freeing his anchor. He does, and Colene, Darius, Seqiro, and Provos slide through the modes to the new anchor, Oria.

Fractal Mode
- Author: Piers Anthony
- Cover artist: Daniel R. Horne
- Language: English
- Series: Mode
- Genre: Fantasy
- Publisher: Ace/Putnam
- Publication date: January 1992
- Publication place: United States
- Media type: Print (Hardcover and Paperback)
- Pages: 344 (paperback edition)
- ISBN: 978-0-441-25126-1 (paperback edition)
- Preceded by: Virtual Mode
- Followed by: Chaos Mode

=== Fractal Mode ===
Nona is the woman ordained to bring the anima, the force of female magic, to her home planet of Oria, which is part of a fractal universe. In order to summon the Megaplayers, a group of musical giants, to help her, she dances by a sea cliff and unwittingly becomes the new anchor person.

After Colene, Darius, Seqiro, and Provos arrive in Julia Mode, Nona and her friend Stave prompt them to report to the nearest despot castle. Though the despots attempt to discredit Darius, rape Colene, and steal Seqiro, the four companions escape captivity and rejoin Nona and Stave. They help Nona travel to Jupiter, where she again seeks the Megaplayers. Angus, a native of Jupiter, advises Nona on how to bring the anima and ferries the party back to Oria.

Nona, who must stand on a specific rad to summon the magic of the anima, has no idea how to find the correct one. Colene and Provos travel back to Earth in order to learn enough nomenclature to allow Colene to help Nona number the rads. While in the Earth mode, Colene rescues an abused girl, Esta, and her uncle, Slick, from a life of crime and despair. Though Slick and Esta plan to flee the country together, a police pursuit forces them to seek refuge on the Virtual Mode.

Meanwhile, Darius, Seqiro, Nona, and Stave have been forced to hide from the despots in the underwater caves of the rabble, a community of quasi-humans who are able to transform their bodies. Though the rabble initially plan to force all four companions to remain until they breed with one thousand rabble each, they agree to free Darius, Seqiro, and Nona if Stave will remain for four thousand breedings. Nona promises to allow four thousand rabble to live on the surface after she brings the anima, whereupon they will release Stave.

Colene and her companions return to Oria and reunite with the rest of the anchor persons. Colene helps Nona find the correct rad while the others distract the despots, and Nona successfully invokes the anima, shifting the magic of Oria to favor women. Nona joins the party on the Virtual Mode, and they return to Provos' anchor, where Provos plans to adopt Slick and Esta as son and granddaughter. Provos releases her anchor, and Colene, Darius, Seqiro, and Nona slide through the Virtual Mode to the newest anchor, Shale.

Chaos Mode
- Author: Piers Anthony
- Cover artist: Daniel R. Horne
- Language: English
- Series: Mode
- Genre: Science fiction
- Publisher: Ace/Putnam
- Publication date: 1993
- Publication place: United States
- Media type: Print (Hardcover and Paperback)
- Pages: 358 (paperback edition)
- ISBN: 978-0-441-00132-3 (paperback edition)
- Preceded by: Fractal Mode
- Followed by: DoOon Mode

=== Chaos Mode ===
Burgess, a hiver, acted as a diplomat to other hives. After he contacted a hive which suffered from the mental disease of bigotry, his own hive cast him out and forced him to flee across the plains. Bereft of his community, he eagerly becomes an anchor person and joins the companions of the Virtual Mode. Colene, Darius, Seqiro, and Nona are initially concerned that the new anchor person may be an alien monster, but Seqiro soon helps Nona to establish mental contact, and their fears are allayed. Colene soon realizes that this reality is the product of Earth's alternative evolution, and she names the mode Shale and the new anchor Burgess.

Though the party plans to continue traveling the Virtual Mode, Colene is soon pursued by the mind predator which once attacked Provos. The anchor persons, attacked by the hivers near the anchor point, are forced to spend several days in Shale. While there, each of the humans learns to relate to Burgess, and Burgess declares the strange group to be his new hive. Though the companions encounter many hostile native creatures, they are eventually able to reach the anchor point and return to the Virtual Mode.

As the companions approach the Julia mode, the mind predator returns and attacks Colene. Only Burgess seems able to mitigate the effect, so he carries Colene while the pursuit continues. The party, once again forced to wait in an anchor mode, soon discovers that Oria is in a martial state due to the lack of strong magical leadership. Because Nona doesn't want to remain and become queen, she enlists Angus' help to recruit Amazons from a slightly larger anima world to become regents on Oria. Afterwards, Nona feels free to return to the Virtual Mode with the others.

As they travel toward Earth, Burgess' health begins to fail, and the anchor persons plan to spend some time in the Earth mode while he recuperates. Colene and Nona enlist the help of Amos Forell to cure Burgess' malady, which turns out to be a magnesium deficiency. In order to repay Amos, Darius and Seqiro help a troubled boy by spreading his despair to his unsympathetic community. While in the bad part of town, they are also able to seek revenge on the group of delinquents who mugged Darius in the first novel, as well as the boys who raped Colene. Colene reconciles with her parents, who agree to allow her to marry Darius, but she misses her own wedding while tiding Burgess through a bad reaction. Nona, however, acts as Colene's proxy, so Darius and Colene do become legally married on Earth.

While passing through the modes of the telepathic animals, Colene is once again attacked by the mind predator. The companions, forced to seek refuge in Seqiro's mode, discover a mare who has been mind-blasted, telepathically attacked and stripped of her memories. Colene heals the mare by imprinting her with the character of her imaginary friend, Maresy Doats. After defeating his rival Koturo, Seqiro becomes herd stallion. Though he would prefer to remain on the Virtual Mode, Seqiro is forced to free his anchor to relieve Colene of the mind predator's pursuit. Colene, Darius, Nona, and Burgess slide through the modes until they reach the newest anchor mode, DoOon.

DoOon Mode
- Author: Piers Anthony
- Cover artist: Daniel R. Horne
- Language: English
- Series: Mode
- Genre: Science fiction
- Publisher: Tom Doherty Associates, LLC
- Publication date: April 2001
- Publication place: United States
- Media type: Print (Hardcover and Paperback)
- Pages: 377 (paperback edition)
- ISBN: 978-0-8125-7542-2 (paperback edition)
- Preceded by: Chaos Mode

=== DoOon Mode ===
Because the Feline trio of Tom, Cat, and Pussy are in disgrace, they enter a dangerous contest to regain their social status. After the Felines and their Caprine companions win the competition, a no-holds-barred game of capture the flag, they are educated about Colene and Darius and trained to become the next mode anchors. The six nulls, along with four unknown individuals, become co-anchors as soon as Seqiro frees his anchor, and Colene, Darius, Nona, and Burgess are immediately captured by Ddwng.

The companions are taken to the primitive planet Chains, where they are forced to remain until Darius agrees to give the Chip to Ddwng. While there, Burgess and the humans form close bonds with the Felines and with Doe, the Caprine female. Colene persuades the predatory dragons of the world to prey on rats instead of nulls, and Darius agrees to give Ddwng the Chip in return for the continued safety of Chains and its inhabitants.

Once on the Virtual Mode, the party attempts to evade the pursuit of the four unknown anchor persons. Colene regains mental contact with Seqiro, but the mind predator soon finds her, and the group must return to Earth. When Colene discovers her mother Morna is the victim of hallucinations brought on by improper medical treatment, she and her companions force the insurance representative to approve RTMS, an experimental treatment, to cure Colene's and Morna's depression. Nona, Burgess, and Tom repay Amos Forell for his financial help by giving him one of Tom's alien germs to claim as a scientific discovery. Colene returns after one week of her two-week treatment, and the anchor persons return to the Virtual Mode.

Unfortunately, the mind predator soon finds Colene, and the companions attempt to wait it out by staying in Oria. Though one of the regents tries to persuade Nona to stay and become queen, she is unwilling to leave the Virtual Mode. The mind predator remains tenacious, however, and Nona is forced to free her anchor. Nona, who has been engaging in sexual intercourse with Tom, asks him to stay in Julia mode and marry her. Tom loves Nona and realizes his trio is facing destruction anyway, so he agrees.

As soon as Nona frees her anchor, Seqiro and Maresy become co-anchors. Colene, Darius, Burgess, Cat, and Pussy slide to the Horse Mode, where the horses join the party. After passing through several more modes, including Xanth or a world like it, where they encounter Demoness Metria, the companions finally arrive at Darius' home mode. Burgess and the horses settle comfortably on a pasture dais and Colene and Pussy join Darius' household.

After obtaining the Chip, Cat returns to DoOon to discharge his commitment, and Darius shuts down the Virtual Mode. Though Cat is honest, Ddwng suspects treachery and plans to torture it. Cat uses its link to Seqiro and the Key it has secretly swallowed to rescue Doe from Chains, though her trio is destroyed. After transporting back to Darius' mode, Cat and Doe recover, and the Felines adopt Doe as the third member of their new trio.

Though Colene and Darius are married and home at last, Colene remains unable to perform sexually. Pussy convinces Colene to face the mind predator in order to come to terms with her worst fears. After an intense psychological battle, Colene defeats the mind predator, and she is finally healed.

== Anchor modes ==
=== Earth, late 20th century ===
Colene's anchor mode is a contemporary town or small city in Oklahoma. This mode is portrayed realistically, with ordinary laws of physics; however, psionic power and some other forms of magic are functional though somewhat limited.

Colene's house, which is in the suburbs, is close enough to her school that she is able to walk there. Colene calls her house the "Charles Mansion," a pun on Charles Manson. She spends much of her time in Dogwood Bumshed, a wooden shed behind the house, so named because of the dogwood tree it stands under and as a pun on the comic strip character Dagwood Bumstead. Dogwood Bumshed is slightly larger than a playhouse. Colene stores her important possessions there, such as her journal and her picture of a horse, captioned For Whom Was That Neigh?, which is the basis for her imaginary pet horse, "Maresy Doats".

=== The Cyngdom of Hlahtar ===
The specific name of Darius' anchor mode is unknown; Colene calls it the "Land of Laughter" or the "Kingdom of Laughter." Sympathetic magic (such as emotional transfer and conjuration) is native to this mode. Psionic power is operational.

The people of Darius' mode live and work on daises high above the ground, due to the numerous sharp crystals covering the land surface. The crystals are multicolored, as are the clouds in the sky. Trees have green trunks and black leaves, and feed from the nutrients contained in the colored clouds. The people wear clothes Colene describes as "Oriental," and women are required to wear secure halters and diapers under their clothing in order to hide their feminine contours. Sexual expression is an important part of culture: concubines are common, and the age of consent is non-existent.

The Mode series makes a referential crossover into the Xanth series in Question Quest, where the Good Magician Humfrey makes a note in his book about Darius being the "Cyng of Hlahtar".

=== The Horse Mode ===
Seqiro's anchor mode, which remains unnamed, is the home of primitive humans and telepathic horses.

The horses, though of inferior intelligence, rule by borrowing the mental potential of their human servants. Horses are socially stratified; notably, a lead stallion heads each community. Their telepathic powers can be used not only to communicate, but to control their servants or increase their ability or skill. They are also capable of stunning humans with a telepathic attack, or even "mind-blasting" other horses, effectively erasing their personalities.

Nearby modes are dominated by telepathic animals of different species (bears, for example).

=== Provos's mode ===
The name of Provos's anchor mode is unknown, and little time is spent there in the novels. The people possess a unique kind of prescience: they remember the future, but not the past. They are highly environmentally-conscious and seem to have a symbiotic relationship with their environment. Houses are tall and narrow so as to avoid interfering with the environment, and are anchored by guy-wires to the thick yellow-trunked and blue-leaved trees. Farming is done wherever space is available without clearing the land. People travel by walking or by public transportation in the form of a large, tame snake with attached seats, which travels along a channel rather like a monorail. Food is organic, and clothing is made of natural fibers.

=== DoOon ===
Ddwng's anchor mode, pronounced /duˈoʊən/, is a super-science reality in which psionic power, including emotional transfer, is possible in limited form, but sympathetic magic is non-operational.

The people of the primary planet have created technology which is able to bypass some of the laws of physics, such as the speed of light, making FTL travel possible. They have refined the science of genetic engineering; people suffer from no genetic diseases and few effects of aging. They are also able to manufacture android-like beings called "nulls" from leftover genetic material. In addition, interstellar travel has made it possible for them to conquer and colonize many of the planets of their galaxy and beyond.

Ddwng's people, though scientifically advanced, have tastes Colene describes as "lowbrow American." In addition, the more powerful members of the mode seem quite ruthless and cruel: in the past, they had attempted to conquer their neighboring modes in order to exploit their resources. Due to these actions, a confederation of other modes confined the DoOon to their home mode and prevented their use of Virtual Mode chips. Leaders possess pain dials that can be used to cause pain directly to the nervous system of anyone within the radius of the possessor. Pain dial levels are graded, rather like Star Trek phasers or The Machine in The Princess Bride.

=== Julia ===
Nona's anchor mode corresponds to the planet Earth, but in a universe which is fractal, rather than spherical, in nature. Her planet, Oria, is one rad on a Mandelbrot set in a Julia universe. Psionic power (not including emotional transfer), conjuration, levitation, and various other magic is operational; however, ordinary laws of physics such the square–cube ratio do not apply.

The culture resembles that of the Middle Ages: the social structure is similar to the feudal system, and few advances have been made in technology. The peasant class has few rights, and women are expected to marry and produce offspring. Because even peasants are expected to possess the magic of simple illusion, those who do not become outcasts, or "rabble," and are forced to live under the land's surface.

Every few generations, the source of power on each planet shifts between animus, the male force, and anima, the female force. When the animus is in power, firstborn men possess the greater magic and a woman loses her magic as she gives birth to more children. When the anima is in power, lastborn women possess the greater magic, and a woman's magic grows as she gives birth to more children. Sex and social class is easily identifiable by tunic color: black and white are worn by the men and women, respectively, who are empowered by the animus; blue and red are worn by the men and women, respectively, who are empowered by the anima. Those of unknown rank wear green, and animals wear yellow.

=== Shale ===
Burgess' anchor mode is the product of alternative evolution on Earth, predicated on the assumption that, had the creatures of the Burgess Shale survived the Cambrian period, evolution might never have given rise to chordates. Shale is populated by hivers, such as Burgess, and evolved versions of many other creatures, such as giant land crabs, giant Hallucigenia, land-bound Marella, and giant Anomalocaris. Most of the creatures of this mode seem largely predatory in nature. For example, the beach area is populated by shears, flying creatures with scissor-like beaks that attack in swarms, and the ground of the plains area conceals huge carnivorous underground worms. Hivers such as Burgess appear to be the only creatures that have created a form of civilization.

== Characters ==
=== Primary characters ===
Colene
Colene, the protagonist, is a fourteen-year-old girl, a high school freshman from Oklahoma. Though pretty and popular, she has a dark secret: stresses from her dysfunctional family and lasting depression from a past rape have made her suicidal. Incredibly intelligent and creative, she is also stubborn, willful, and somewhat immature at times. Her past experiences have given her an urge to flirt with death and a tendency to sexual exhibitionism. Colene has a great love of horses, and writes letters to an imaginary friend named "Maresy Doats" based on a picture of a horse.
Darius
Darius is Cyng of Hlahtar, the one responsible for the emotional transfer of joy to the people of his homeland. Darius is handsome and intelligent, but without great physical prowess. Though mature, he is still considered a young man in his culture, and he holds somewhat romantic notions about the nature of his post. Darius' code of ethics is rigid, and he considers his honor binding and ultimate.
Seqiro
Seqiro is a telepathic horse, a large stallion of approximately eighteen hands. Though he possesses little native intelligence, he is adept at relating to human minds and using their intelligence to buttress and enhance his own. Because the other leading stallions felt threatened by Seqiro, they attempted to confine him to his stall. Seqiro appreciates female human company, particularly Nona's, but his ultimate love and loyalty lie with Colene.
Nona
Nona is the "ninth of the ninth"—the ninth daughter of the eighth daughter of the seventh, back nine generations. The significance of her birth gives her strong magic and the ability to bring the anima, the female magical force. She also possesses significant physical beauty and musical skill. Though she is kind and relatively intelligent, her extreme innocence and naïveté hamper her ability to adapt to some situations.
Burgess
Burgess is a hiver, the evolutionary equivalent of a human being in the Shale Mode. Because he is unable to return to his own hive, he joins the party of anchor persons out of necessity. He soon adapts to their mode of communication, even though he is unaccustomed to individuality and emotion. Unhampered by human foibles, he is direct and honest, and sometimes surprisingly insightful, particularly regarding Colene.
Pussy
Pussy is a seductive null of the Feline persuasion. Like other female nulls, she is trained to provide for her employer's sexual and emotional needs.
Cat
Cat is a neuter null of the Feline persuasion. Imminently calm and rational, he is the intellectual backbone of his null trio.
Tom
Tom is a muscular male null of the Feline persuasion. Though trained to be relentless in physical combat, he is rather insecure in emotional matters.

=== Significant secondary characters ===
Provos, an older woman who can effectively remember the future but cannot foresee the past. She becomes an anchor because her memory of future events has become foggy — there's a blank space which troubles her, and she quests to recover these lost memories. Because of her backward memory, the others have difficulty communicating with her to any great extent.

Maresy Doats, a fictional mare to whom Colene addresses her journal entries. She represents Colene's mature and rational self, and Colene considers Maresy her best friend until she meets Seqiro. Late in the series, Maresy becomes incarnate in a telepathic mare from Sequiro's Mode whose memories and personality have been erased due to persecution from the dominant horses of that society. Rather than leave the mare mentally impaired, Colene uses her improving telepathic power to imprint the personality of "Maresy Doats" upon the mare; in the process, Colene essentially creates the perfect mate for Sequiro.

Ddwng, pronounced /dəˈdʊŋ/, is the emperor of the DoOon. Ruthless and unethical, Ddwng is determined to coerce Darius into giving him the Chip that will allow him to travel to and exploit the Virtual Mode. Though clever, he is extremely suspicious, particularly after having been previously balked.

The mind predator, a creature of the Virtual Mode who attacks travelers whose minds are in conflict. It first attempts to feed on Provos, but later pursues Colene. It can be escaped by crossing into anchor modes, where it cannot pursue.

Prima, a mode traveler from a mode similar to Darius' home who was captured on the Virtual Mode. Prima possesses an ability to magnify joy which rivals Kublai's; in their youth, they sought to place Prima in post as Cyng of Hlahtar, but were denied because of sexual bias.

Doe, a null of the Caprine persuasion, has the appearance of a beautiful woman with a face suggestive of that of a goat.

Garret, Colene's father. A victim of depression and the spouse of an alcoholic, Garret seeks to avoid troubles at home by having extramarital affairs. Though often absent, he attempts to be understanding to Colene and encourages her when she seeks to become more independent.

Morna, Colene's mother. A victim of chronic, untreated depression, Morna turns to alcohol to dull her pain. Though she is aware of her husband's infidelity, she generally avoids conflict lest he criticize her for her alcoholism. Brought up Roman Catholic, she attempts to instill many of her traditional values in Colene.

Amos Forell, aspiring biologist and Colene's former eighth grade science teacher.

Kublai, a former Cyng of Hlahtar who assumes Darius' post while he is traveling the Virtual Mode. After being forced to marry and discard many women during his tenure, Kublai has finally married Koren, the woman he loves.

Koren, once Kublai's wife, must instead become his mistress while he performs the role of Cyng of Hlahtar.

Angus, a giant from the planet Jupiter in the Julia Mode who helps Nona after becoming enraptured with her music.

Slick, a member of the criminal underworld in Colene's home town. Though he is a hired killer who carries a straight razor, he longs for a normal life. Slick longs to see his niece Esta, but her mother, his sister, has barred him from doing so because of his unsavory connections.

Esta, Slick's niece, is a depressive twelve-year-old with an unhappy home life.

Stave, a peasant of Oria, is a friend and possible love interest of Nona.

=== Significance of character names ===
Colene is the anglicized form of the name Cailín, which means "girl" in Irish.

Darius was a common name for kings in ancient Persia.

Maresy Doats is named for the song "Mairzy Doats." Colene was unaware of the proper spelling at the time she named her imaginary friend.

Kublai is reminiscent of Kublai Khan, a Chinese emperor.

Koren is possibly derived from the Greek word kore, "maiden."

Prima may be a feminization of Primus, which means "first" in Latin.

Tom is the name for a male cat and may also be a shortened form of tomcat, a slang term indicating sexual promiscuity.

Pussy is a double-entendre on the name for a female cat and a slang term for the female sex organ. Female cats are more commonly called "queens."

Nona means "ninth" in Latin.

Burgess‘ real name is a series of electrical impulses, so Colene calls him after the Burgess Shale.

Doe is a generic name for female animals of several hoofed species. Though a female goat may be called a "doe," they are often called "nannies" as well.

Morna is the anglicized form of Muirne, which means "beloved" in Irish. It also sounds similar to the word mourn, meaning "to grieve."

== Patterns ==
- For much of the series, the anchor persons are telepathically linked with the help of Seqiro. Thoughts are written as italics.
- The Mode series is written in alternating third person limited perspective. Out of all four novels, Seqiro's perspective is used in only one chapter.
- Seqiro's voice is usually written as italics. Only in Burgess' perspective are Seqiro's thoughts voiced with quotation marks.
- Burgess' voice is written as narration, or indirect quotes.
- Each of the first three novels ends with a member of the party letting go of their anchor and a new member taking hold.
- Each of the first three novels ends with Colene saying, "Uh-oh," or "Oh, no," as the party meets the new anchor person.
- The titles of the novels generally indicate where the most time is spent in each. In Virtual Mode, much time is spent on the Virtual Mode itself. In Fractal Mode, the primary setting is Julia Mode, a fractal universe. Chaos Mode is fragmented, with several sections set in various anchor modes and a great deal of time spent on the Virtual Mode as well. DoOon is the setting for approximately half of DoOon Mode.
- The Earth Mode is visited at least once in each novel.
- Colene recounts her rape in each novel.

== Publication ==
According to Piers Anthony in the author's note to DoOon Mode, the series achieved limited release due to an error on the part of a representative of the initial publishing company, Ace/Putnam. Because the number of paperback copies ordered is based on the number of hardcovers sold, the series never achieved the widespread popularity Anthony had hoped for. Subsequent novels in the series continued to suffer from the inadequate sales of the first, finally finding Anthony unable to find a publisher for the fourth novel. Anthony credits the Internet with raising his awareness of fan support for the series and of alternative publishing methods. Though the final book, DoOon Mode, was eventually published by Tor, an imprint of Tom Doherty Associates, LLC, its publication was delayed until 2001, eleven years after the writing of the first book, Virtual Mode.
