= Muhammad Sa'eed Al Amoudi =

Saudi Arabian journalist, poet and official

Muhammad Sa'eed al-Amoudi
- محمد سعيد العامودي
- Born: 1905; Mecca, Hejaz vilayet, Ottoman Empire
- Died: February 16, 1991 (aged 86); Mecca, Saudi Arabia
- Occupations: journalist; literary critic; poet; official
- Writing career
- Language: Arabic
- Years active: 1932-1991

Muhammad bin Sa'eed Al-Amoudi (Arabic: محمد سعيد العامودي, romanized: Muḥammad Saʻīd al-ʻĀmūdī; 1905 – 16 February 1991) was a Saudi Arabian journalist, literary critic and official. After graduation from Al-Falah school in Mecca, he worked in commerce for a while, then held several administrative positions, including: head of the editorial board of the General Post and Telegraph Authority and the editor-in-chief of its magazine until 1971, member of the Consultative Assembly of Saudi Arabia from 1951 to 1954, chief editor of the Muslim World League magazine and Sawt Al-Hijaz newspaper for a while. He also employed by the Ministry of Education for several committees. During his official career, he published many works in the magazines of Al-Muqtataf and Al-Hilal and was a member of the Modern Literature Association in Cairo, which was headed by the poet Ibrahim Nagi. He died after a long illness at the age of 86 in his birthplace. Al-Amoudi wrote many essays, short stories, poems, and reviews. A prominent 20th-century Saudi Arabian journalist, his complete works were published in 3 volumes in 2007.

== Family Background and Birth ==
Muhammad bin Sa'eed bin Abdurrahman bin Abdullah Al-Amoudi was born in Mecca in 1905 to Sa'eed bin Abdurrahman Al-Amoudi who belonged to the Quraysh tribe from a Bakrid lineage, tracing his lineage from the descendants of the prominent Tabi'un Talha al-Khayr ibn Abd Allah ibn Abd al-Rahman ibn Abi Bakr, through the house of Al-Amoud al-Din. He pursued his education at Al-Falah School. After graduation he worked with his father, Sa'eed, who was a merchant working in the textile trade, and he had a shop in Al-Suwaiqah which was the market for merchants of fabrics and perfumes, it was included in the Grand Mosque in its first expansion.

== Career ==
He ended his collaboration with his father and moved to government jobs. Worked in various writing-related and administrative positions, including: Heading the editorial board of the General Post and Telegraph Authority in Mecca. When Sawt Al-Hijaz newspaper was published in 1932, he was chosen as supervisor of its editor-in-chief for a short period, but his governmental work in the Telegraph and Post Department did not allow him to continue working there. Sawt Al-Hijaz (Voice of Hijaz) publication considered an extension of the Barid al-Hejaz (Post of Hejaz) newspaper, which was issued by Muhammad Salih Nassif in 1924 during the Hashemite era. After the end of the Hashemites in Hijaz in 1925, most of the Barid al-Hejaz writers moved to Sawt Al-Hijaz. This newspaper later got other names, finally known as Al-Bilad.

In 1951, he was elected as a member of the Consultative Assembly and remained there for three years. He directed and headed the editor-in-chief of the Al-Hajj magazine from 1930 to 1971. He also worked as the editor-in-chief of the Muslim World League magazine from 1965 to 1978. He was chosen by the Ministry of Education twice for membership in the Supreme Council for Science and Arts. He was one of the founding members of the Publishing and Writing Committee and the Committee for Publishing Manuscripts of Hejaz History in 1948. In 1955, he participated in the celebrations of the Iranian Parliament in Tehran as a representative of the Saudi Consultative Assembly. He was one of the founders of the Kuruş Project Association in the Kingdom of Saudi Arabia. However, this association only lasted two insurances.

== Literature interests ==
Ibrahim al-Jundi described him as an "inspiring poet, who collected various meanings, distinguished by his generous flair, the charm of his statement, the eloquence of his logic, and the smoothness of his style." He is considered one of the pioneering writers in the 20th-century Hejaz, was known for classical Arabic text editing, book-summarizing and reviewing. He also wrote many essays and some short stories. As a literary critic, he wrote criticism or introduction for several books of many authors, including: History of the Arabs by Philip K. Hitti, The Hero of Heroes by Abd al-Rahman Azzam, The Caller of Heaven and Neither communism nor colonialism by Abbas Mahmoud al-Aqqad, Allahs Sonne über dem Abendland by Sigrid Hunke and other books by Ali Al-Tantawi, Abdul Jabbar Jomard, Mohammed al-Ghazali and Mikhail Naimy. He published a Quatrain collection in 1980 and a short story collection in 1982, Rāmiz, wa-qiṣaṣ ukhrá. He chose for his stories a realistic direction, aiming for Social reform.

== Death ==
Al-Amoudi died in Mecca on 16 February 1991 after a long illness at the age of 86.

== Awards ==
- 1933: Al-Hilal magazine first prize for the best poem.

== Writings ==
- Arabic: من تاريخنا, romanized: Min tārīkhinā, historical studies, 1954
- Arabic: رباعياتي, romanized: Rubāʻīyātī, poetry, 1980
- Arabic: رامز وقصص أخرى, romanized: Rāmiz, wa-qiṣaṣ ukhrá, stories, 1982
- Arabic: من حديث الكتب, romanized: Min hadith al-kutub, 1983
- Arabic: من أوراقي, romanized: Min awrāqī, literary essays, 1983

== See also ==
- Sa'eed ibn Isa Al-Amoudi
