= As the Crow Flies (novel) =

1991 novel by Jeffrey Archer

- First edition (UK)
- Author: Jeffrey Archer
- Language: English
- Publisher: HarperCollins
- Publication date: May 1991
- Publication place: United Kingdom
- Media type: Print (hardback & paperback)
- Pages: 617 pp (first edition, hardback)
- ISBN: 0-06-017916-3 (first edition, hardback)
- OCLC: 23874769

As the Crow Flies is a novel by Jeffrey Archer. The novel was originally published in hardback by HarperCollins in May 1991. HarperCollins and Random House both published paperback version of this book in 1992.

== Plot ==
The story tells the tale of the Trumper retail empire, through the often overlapping points of view of several of the main characters. The story begins with Charlie, grandson of a barrow costermonger. When his father is killed in World War I, Charlie enlists to take his place, leaving instructions to Rebecca to sell everything and keep his share secure for when he returns. After the troops are demobilized, Charlie returns to London. He makes enquiries and is led to a shop in Chelsea. He is astonished to see a greengrocer shop bearing the words "Trumper, The Honest Trader, Established 1823." Charlie goes about the business of costermonger, rearranging the shop and doing great business. He marries Rebecca Salmon, who leaves her fiancé Guy Trentham for Charlie.

The Trumpers' friend Daphne suggests they find a "front man" to help them run the financial end of the business – a man with the right background who will open doors for them with his connections and class. Colonel Hamilton nicely fits the bill, even though he is not Daphne's first choice. Colonel Hamilton was the commanding officer of Charlie and Guy Trentham's unit in the First World War, but he was discharged after the war. Once satisfied that Charlie is a hard worker and is generating business, combined with his lack of other employment options, he accepts the offer.

Charlie and Rebecca move into a house, and she gets pregnant again. With the looming threat of a general strike, Charlie resolves to keep business as usual, and buys a few more shops at low prices, along with an art gallery which had been previously sold to Guy Trentham's wife. It will be Rebecca's new job after she has completed her thesis for her master's degree. Both attend the graduation ceremony for it, but to Rebecca's shock, Charlie has also been awarded a degree in mathematics, having secretly been attending classes for eight years.

Things at the gallery are rough, as Charlie keeps trying to steal the best pieces for his own art collection. However, things are smooth enough that he and Rebecca take a trip to the United States, where he falls in love with Bloomingdale's and Marshall Field's, resolving to build a store greater than either of those in London.

World War II begins, and Charlie's greengrocers store is bombed by the Luftwaffe. He re-enlists in the army, but Prime Minister Winston Churchill needs him for logistics, obtaining and distributing food for the troops and the home front. Daniel, Charlie's son, enlists and works on the breaking of the Enigma code. He has long since figured out that Guy Trentham was his true father and that Mrs. Trentham's hatred of the Trumper family stems from him, as Rebecca named Guy Trentham as his father at the time.

Mrs. Trentham is horrified to learn her father plans to leave everything to Daniel Trumper. Upon her father's death, Mrs. Trentham uses the estate to buy as much Trumper's stock as she can, intending for her son Nigel to become chairman of the company.

At the Trumpers' housewarming party, Daniel meets Cathy, an employee at his parents' art gallery, and the two become lovers. In the midst of it, Cathy writes to Mrs. Trentham concerning her birth and later reveals to Daniel she is pregnant. Mrs. Trentham sends a letter to Daniel revealing that Cathy is Guy's child and therefore his biological sister. Horrified, Daniel kills himself and the Trumpers take in a traumatised Cathy.

Cathy becomes the Trumpers' protégé. Mrs. Trentham dies and leaves her estate to Nigel. Nigel intends to use the money as collateral to mount a hostile takeover of Trumper's. After much maneuvering, the motion is defeated and Cathy becomes the new chairman of Trumper's.

Charlie is named life president, but is eventually banned from the store, to let the next generation take over. As he has become a lord, he attends parliament, and suddenly gains a new hold on life, rising early and talking about agriculture committees. However, when a request comes in for an order of Cuban cigars for Mr. Field from the United States, neither Rebecca nor Cathy knows which brand he smokes. They find out that Charlie's tales of parliament and committees were a fabrication. They eventually track him down to his origins, finding him selling fruits and vegetables out of a barrow with great success. Both laugh at the situation, but realise Charlie is happy doing what he always loved best. Cathy notes he's come a long way since his youth at the barrow, but Rebecca says it was really only a few miles "as the crow flies."
