= Rick Rofihe =

Canadian American short story writer and editor

Rick Rofihe (born 1950 in Bridgewater, Nova Scotia) is a Canadian American short story writer and editor.

== Life ==
His work has appeared in The New Yorker Epiphany, Grand Street, Open City, The New York Times, The Village Voice, SPY, The East Hampton Star, and online in Mr. Beller’s Neighborhood.

He founded the literary journal Anderbo.

He has taught fiction-writing at Gotham Writers’ Workshop and in the MFA program at Columbia University. He has also taught privately in New York City.

He judged the annual RRofihe Trophy short-story contest for Open City Magazine & Books.

== Awards ==
- 1991 Whiting Award.
- Canada Council.

== Works ==
- Fresh Grease: New Writing from the Maritimes (Publisher) Straw Books, 1971.
- Gushy & Gooey and other stuff from the kids of Nova Skotia (Editor) Anderbo Books, 1971 & 1973.
- Such a neat idea, Nova Scotia people, poems and stories (Editor) Anderbo Books, 1973.
- Father Must. Farrar Straus Giroux. 1991. ISBN 978-0-374-15384-7.
- Boys who Do the Bop. Mercer Street Books Publishing. 2023. ISBN 978-1-958-57603-8.

== Reviews ==
These surgically precise slices of intelligent life are distinguished by virtuosic phrase-making and fetchingly off-beat specifics.

—Bruce Allen, The New York Times Book Review.

Mr. Rofihe can be surprisingly effective, with a quirky tenderness. Oddly touching, the interest here lies not in the stories’ mundane incidents, but in things barely hinted at: beneath this calm surface, powerful currents flow.

—Bruce Bawer, The Wall Street Journal.

Rick Rofihe’s stories have bulging motor nerves and threadlike muscles. They are contour almost without mass; lines of fierce magnetic energy with only a dusting of iron fillings to reveal their course. They are elusive, but not in the sense of escaping us. It is more as if we are unable to find them, and then they spring out at us; we are not sure from where.

—Richard Eder, Los Angeles Times.

The narratives weave toward minor epiphanies, backing and filling, curving around their characters with a seeming lack of coherence—yet they are strangely compelling, as the refusal to make plain their meanings gives more depth to implication.

—Michael Darling, Books in Canada.

Confident in his reach, Rofihe disorients as much as he dazzles.

Kirkus Reviews
