= Gabriel Bergmoser =

Australian author and playwright (born 1991)

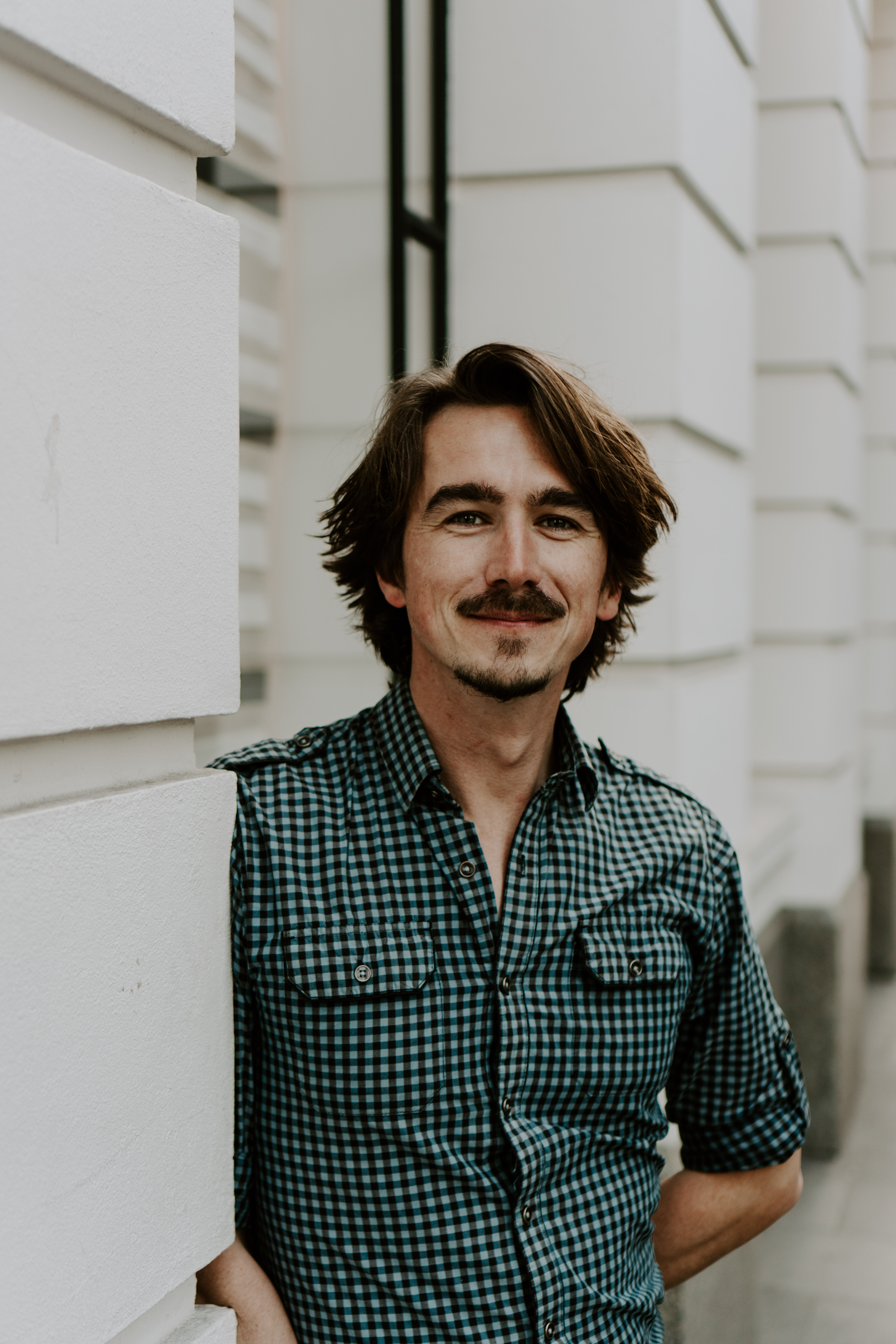
- Born: 1991 (age 34–35); New Zealand
- Education: Victorian College of the Arts
- Occupations: Author; playwright; screenwriter
- Website: Official website

Gabriel Bergmoser (born 1991) is an Australian author and playwright. Raised in the rural town of Mansfield, Victoria, Bergmoser completed his master's degree in screenwriting at the Victorian College of the Arts. Bergmoser's first novel was Boone Shepard.

== Early life and education ==
Gabriel Bergmoser was born in 1991 and was raised in the rural town of Mansfield. He is a graduate of the Victorian College of the Arts (VCA).

== Career ==
Bergmoser won the Sir Peter Ustinov Television Scriptwriting Award in 2015 for his screenplay Windmills.

Bergmoser's play The Trial of Dorian Gray, based on The Picture of Dorian Gray (1891) by Oscar Wilde, premiered at the 2019 Midsumma Festival in Melbourne directed by Peter Blackburn. A negative review in The Sydney Morning Herald said that Bergmoser had "a bright future", but criticized the script for failing to meet its potential and "engage critically with our censorious present [...] flashes of Wildean wit are few and far between, and precise expression sometimes eludes [Bergmoser]."

His play The Critic was performed several times throughout Melbourne, including at Club Voltaire in North Melbourne in 2016 and at the 2019 Melbourne Fringe Festival. A review in the Herald praised it as a "amusing piece of metatheatre" that addresses its themes with "nuance".

=== 2020–2022: Two-book deal with HarperCollins ===
In 2019, Bergmoser signed a two-book deal with HarperCollins.

The first of the books and Bergmoser's debut adult novel, The Hunted, was released in Australia in April 2020 to positive reviews.

In 2022, Bergmoser was reported by Variety to be attached to write the script of Vertigo Entertainment's adaptation of the survival horror webtoon GremoryLand.

== Personal life ==
Bergmoser resides in Melbourne, Victoria.

== Bibliography ==
=== Novels ===
- The True Color of a Little White Lie (2021)
- The Caretaker (2023)
- High Rise (2025)

==== Boone Shepard series ====
- Boone Shepard (2016)
- Boone Shepard's American Adventure (2017)
- Boone Shepard: The Silhouette and the Sacrifice (2018)

==== Andromache Peters series ====
- Andromache Between Worlds (2024)
- Andromache in the Dark (2025)

==== Hunted series ====
- The Hunted (2020)
- The Inheritance (2021)

=== Audible Originals ===
- The Consequence (2021)
- The Hitchhiker (2022)
- The Lodger (2024)
- Backstory (2025)

=== Plays ===
- Reunion (2013)
- We Can Work It Out (2015)
- The Lucas Conundrum (2016)
- Regression (2016)
- The Critic (2016)
- Springsteen (2017)
- Heroes (2017)
- The Commune (2017)
- Moonlite (2018) - musical (music by Dan Nixon)
- The Trial of Dorian Gray (2019)

=== Screenplays ===
- The Pact - 2020 web series, 3 episodes
- Pencil Pals - 2020 TV series, 1 episode

== Awards ==
- 2015: Sir Peter Ustinov Television Scriptwriting Award for Windmills
