= Assia Djebar =

Algerian feminist novelist (1936–2015)

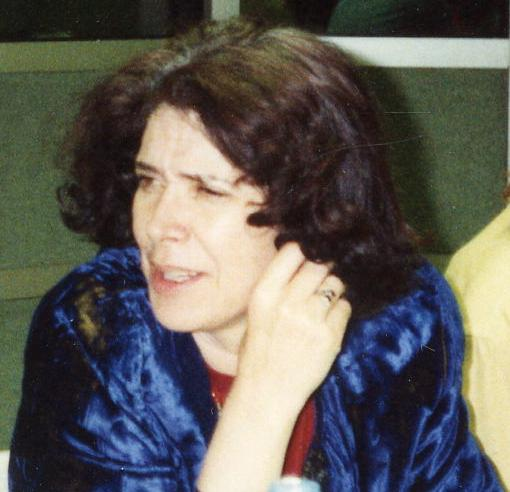
- Djebar in 1992
- Born: Fatima-Zohra Imalayen; 30 June 1936; Cherchell, Colonial Algeria
- Died: 6 February 2015 (aged 78); Paris, France
- Education: École Normale Supérieure
- Occupations: Novelist; essayist; professor
- Writing career
- Subject: Feminism
- Notable works: La soif; Les impatients; Les enfants du nouveau monde; Les alouettes naïves
- Notable awards: Neustadt International Prize for Literature; Yourcenar Prize

Signature
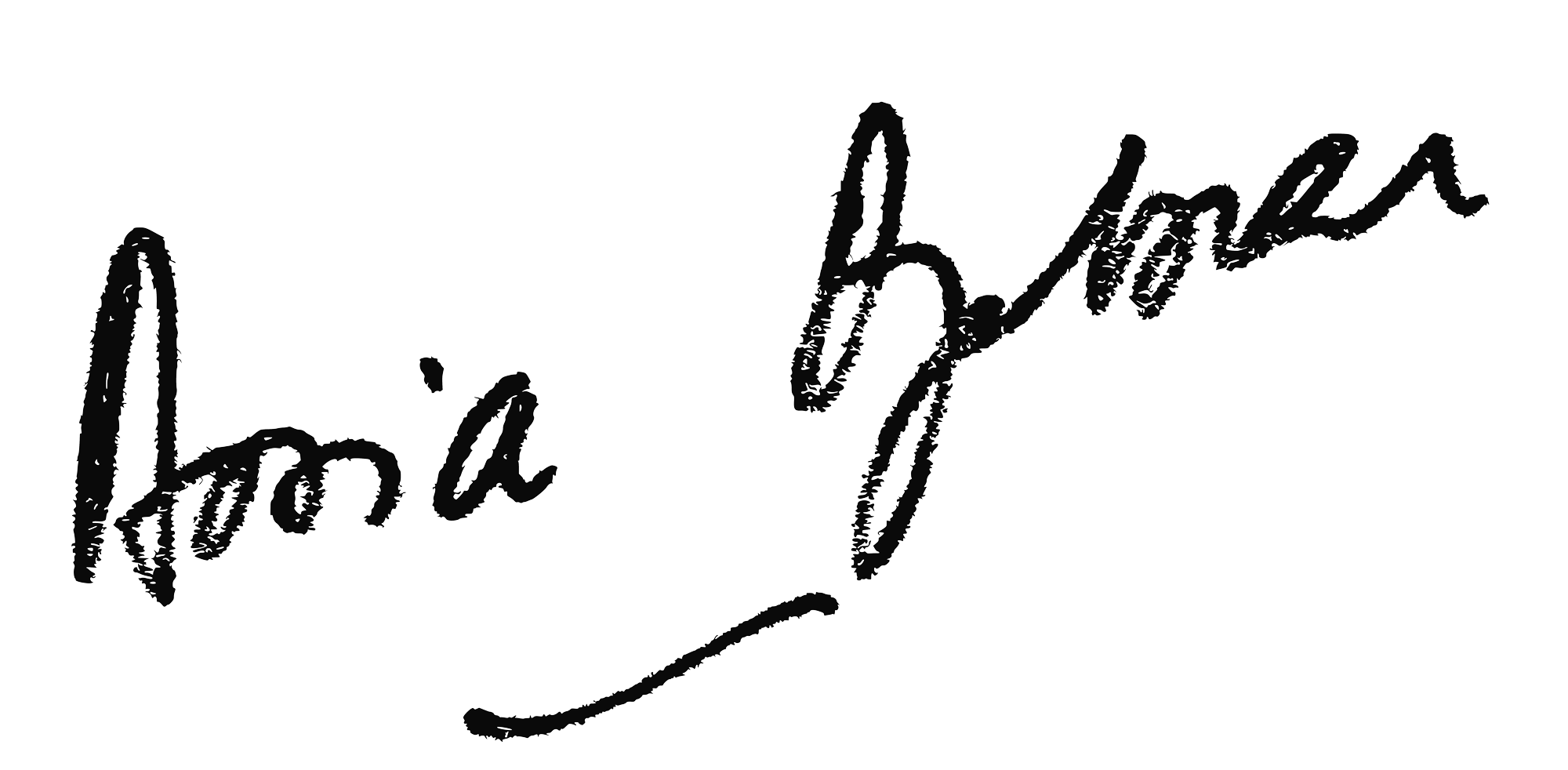

Fatima-Zohra Imalayen (Arabic: فاطمة الزهراء إيمالاين; 30 June 1936 – 6 February 2015), known by her pen name Assia Djebar (Arabic: آسيا جبار), was an Algerian novelist, translator and filmmaker. Most of her works deal with obstacles faced by women, and she is noted for her feminist stance. She is "frequently associated with women's writing movements, her novels are clearly focused on the creation of a genealogy of Algerian women, and her political stance is virulently anti-patriarchal as much as it is anti-colonial." Djebar is considered to be one of North Africa's pre-eminent and most influential writers. She was elected to the Académie Française on 16 June 2005, the first writer from the Maghreb to achieve such recognition. For the entire body of her work she was awarded the 1996 Neustadt International Prize for Literature. She was often named as a contender for the Nobel Prize for Literature.

== Early life ==
Fatima-Zehra Imalayen or Djebbar was born on 30 June 1936 in Cherchell, Algeria, to Tahar Imalhayène and Bahia Sahraoui, a family of Chenouas Berber origin. She was raised in Cherchell, a small seaport village near Algiers in the province of Aïn Defla. Djebar's father taught French at Mouzaïaville, a primary school she attended. Later, Djebar attended a Quranic private boarding school in Blida, where she was one of only two girls. She studied at Collège de Blida, a high school in Algiers, where she was the only Muslim in her class. She attended the École normale supérieure de jeunes filles in 1955, becoming the first Algerian and Muslim woman to be educated at France's most elite schools. Her studies were interrupted by the Algerian War, but she later continued her education in Tunis.

== Career ==
In 1957, she chose the pen name Assia Djebar for the publication of her first novel, La Soif ("The Thirst"). Another book, Les Impatients, followed the next year. Also in 1958, she and Ahmed Ould-Rouïs began a marriage that would eventually end in divorce. Djebar taught at the University of Rabat (1959–1962) and then at the University of Algiers where she was made the department head for the French section.

In 1962, Djebar returned to Algeria and published Les Enfants du Nouveau Monde, and followed that in 1967 with Les Alouettes Naïves. She lived in Paris between 1965 and 1974 before returning to Algeria again. She remarried in 1980 to the Algerian poet Malek Alloula. The couple lived in Paris, where she had a research appointment at the Algerian Cultural Center.

In 1997, Djebar became the director for the Center of French and Francophone Studies at Louisiana State University. She held that position until 2001. In 1985, Djebar published L'Amour, la fantasia (translated as Fantasia: An Algerian Cavalcade, Heinemann, 1993), in which she "repeatedly states her ambivalence about language, about her identification as a Western-educated, Algerian, feminist, Muslim intellectual, about her role as spokesperson for Algerian women as well as for women in general."

In 2005, Djebar was elected to France's foremost literary institution, the Académie Française, an institution tasked with guarding the heritage of the French language and whose members, known as the "immortals", are chosen for life. She was the first writer from North Africa to be elected to the organization. and the fifth woman to join the academy. Djebar was a Silver Chair professor of Francophone literature at New York University.

Djebar was known as a voice of reform for Islam across the Arab world, especially in the field of advocating for increased rights for women.

== Death ==
Djebar died in February 2015, aged 78 in Paris, France.

== Awards ==
In 1985, she won the Franco-Arab Friendship Prize, for L'Amour la Fantasia.

In 1996, Djebar won the Neustadt International Prize for Literature for her contribution to world literature.

The following year, she won the Marguerite Yourcenar Prize.

In 1998, she won the International Prize of Palmi.

In 2000, she won the Peace Prize of the German Book Trade.

== Tributes ==
On 30 June 2017, Google dedicated a Doodle to the novelist for the 81st anniversary of her birth. The Doodle reached all the countries of the Arab World. A library named after Djebar was opened in 2018 in the 20th arrondissement of Paris.

== Works ==
- La Soif, 1957 (English: The Mischief)
- Les impatients, 1958
- Les Enfants du Nouveau Monde, 1962 (English: Children of the New World: a novel, trans. Marjolijn De Jager: New York: Feminist Press at the City University of New York, 2005; ISBN 9781558615113)
- Les Alouettes naïves, 1967
- Poèmes pour une algérie heureuse, 1969
- Rouge l'aube
- Femmes d'Alger dans leur appartement, 1980 (English: Women of Algiers in Their Apartment; Charlottesville: UP of Virginia, 1999; ISBN 9780813918808)
- L'Amour, la fantasia, 1985 (English: Fantasia: An Algerian Cavalcade, trans. Dorothy S. Blair; Portsmouth, N.H., Heinemann, 1993 (repr. 2003), ISBN 978-0435086213)
- Ombre sultane 1987 (English: A Sister to Scheherazade)
- Loin de Médine, (English: Far from Medina)
- Vaste est la prison, 1995 (English: So Vast the Prison, trans. Betsy Wing; Sydney: Duffy & Snellgrove, 2002; ISBN 9781876631383)
- Le blanc de l'Algérie, 1996 (English: Algerian White)
- Oran, langue morte, 1997 (English: The Tongue's Blood Does Not Run Dry: Algerian Stories)
- Les Nuits de Strasbourg, 1997
- La femme sans sépulture, 2002
- La disparition de la langue française, 2003
- Nulle part dans la maison de mon père, 2008

=== Cinema ===
- La Nouba des femmes du Mont Chenoua, 1977
- La Zerda ou les chants de l'oubli, 1979
