= Georges Tate =

French historian (1943–2009)

- Born: 26 February 1943
- Died: 5 June 2009 (aged 66); Joigny, France
- Education: École normale supérieure de Fontenay-Saint-Cloud
- Occupation: Historian

Georges Tate (26 February 1943 – 5 June 2009) was a French historian and professor of ancient history and archaeology at the Versailles Saint-Quentin-en-Yvelines University, Doctor of Arts and correspondent of the Académie des Inscriptions et Belles-Lettres. He was a specialist on the history of late antiquity and Early Middle Ages in Near East.

== Career ==
Georges Tate studied at the École normale supérieure de Fontenay-Saint-Cloud and received a doctorate in literature, then he taught history at the École Supérieure des Lettres de Beyrouth. He was secretary and then became director of the Institut Français d'Archéologie du Proche-Orient from 1980 to 1990. From 1990 to 1994, he was professor of ancient history at the University of Franche-Comté. He also held the position of Cultural Advisor in Baghdad. As a specialist in the East from the 3rd century BC to the 12th century AD, he has published numerous articles on Syria's rural economy and society from Roman times to the Byzantine Empire.

== L'Orient des Croisades ==
L'Orient des Croisades
- Author: Georges Tate
- Original title: L'Orient des Croisades
- Translator: Lory Frankel
- Cover artist: Pierre-Marie Valat. After a miniature in Roman de Godefroy de Bouillon et de Saladin.
- Language: French
- Series: Découvertes Gallimard●Histoire
- Release number: 129
- Subject: Crusades
- Genre: Nonfiction monograph
- Publisher: FR: Éditions Gallimard; US: Harry N. Abrams; UK: Thames & Hudson
- Publication date: 1991
- Publication place: France
- English publication date: 1996
- Media type: Print (Paperback)
- Pages: 192 pp.
- ISBN: 978-2-070-53176-9 (first edition)
- OCLC: 999532902
- Preceded by: Rollermania
- Followed by: Histoires de kourganes : La redécouverte de l'or des Scythes
- Website: www.gallimard.fr/Catalogue/GALLIMARD/Decouvertes-Gallimard/Decouvertes-Gallimard/Histoire/L-Orient-des-Croisades

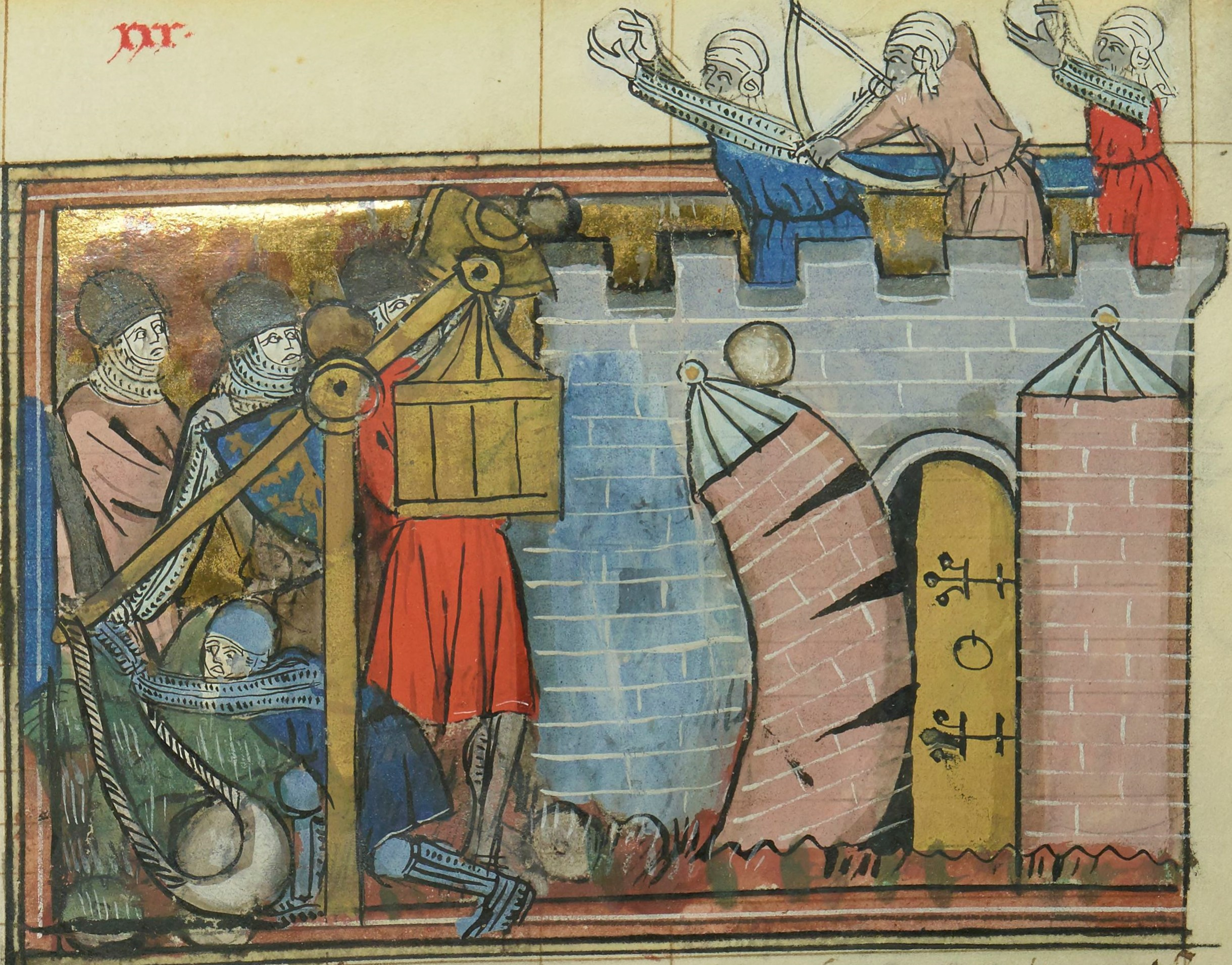
Siege of Nicaea

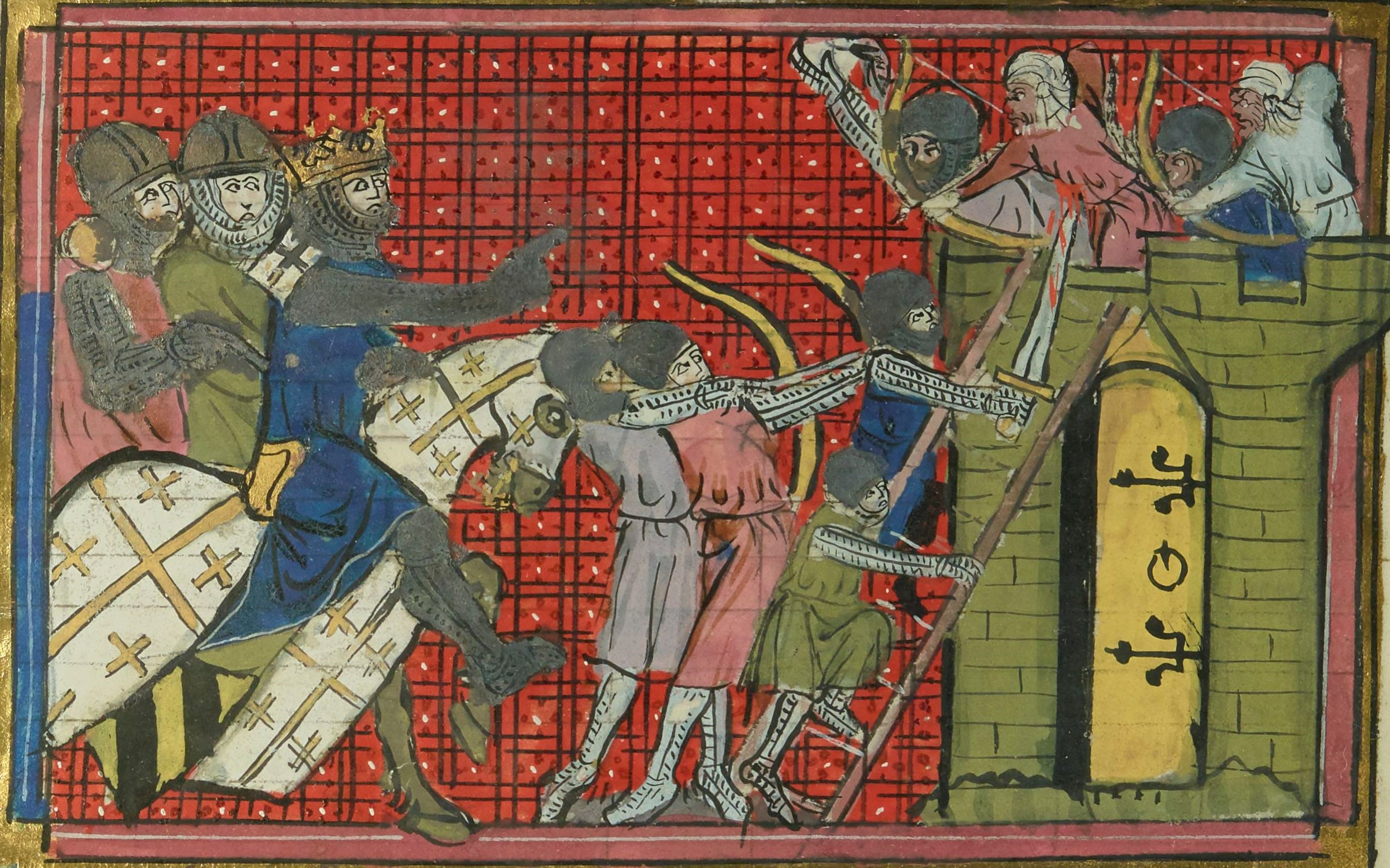
Siege of Artah

Miniatures in Roman de Godefroy de Bouillon et de Saladin, after which the cover image was created.

In 1096, Pope Urban II initiated the First Crusade (1095–1099) aimed at recovering the Holy Land from Muslim rule. From Godfrey of Bouillon to Saint Louis, for two centuries, Westerners from all social classes marched to conquer and defend the Holy Land. Religious convictions or political considerations? In the name of Christ, they slaughtered the infidels, took over Nicaea, Antioch, Tyre, Jerusalem, and founded the Latin States of the East. For Muslims, this epic of faith was a barbaric aggression. With the emir Imad ad-Din Zengi and Nur ad-Din, his son and successor, they proclaimed jihād or holy war. The myth of the invincibility of the Franks was destroyed. Saladin, sultan of Egypt and Syria, was a fatal blow to Westerners who were permanently expelled from the Holy Land in 1291.

Georges Tate retraces the stages of this bloody confrontation between two worlds in this small volume—L'Orient des Croisades (lit. 'The East of the Crusades'; UK edition – The Crusades and the Holy Land; US edition – The Crusaders: Warriors of God)—published by Éditions Gallimard in their Découvertes collection. According to standards of the collection, the book is profusely illustrated with colour plates—illustrations taken from medieval illuminated manuscripts, maps, mosaics, frescoes, photographs, drawings, engravings, 19th-century paintings, etc.—and printed on glossy paper.

This work is an attempt by the author to unravel, throughout its historical timeline, the true motivations for some of the bloodiest confrontations in human history. It contains five chapters: I, "The Mediterranean World on the Eve of the Crusades"; II, "The First Crusade"; III, "The Latin States of the East"; IV, "Zengi, Nureddin, and the Unification of Syria"; V, "Saladin's Victory". These are followed by a "Documents" section containing a compilation of excerpts which is divided into ten parts: 1, The First Crusade; 2, The Taking of Jerusalem; 3, Hospitalers and Templars; 4, Jihad and Holy War; 5, Warfare or Military Science; 6, Portrait of Saladin; 7, The Franks in Eastern Eyes; 8, The Frankish Fortresses; 9, Lawrence of Arabia; 10, The Crusades: A Summing Up. The book closes with a chronology of the Crusades in the East, further reading, list of illustrations and index. It has been translated into American and British English, Brazilian and European Portuguese, Czech, Dutch, German, Italian, Japanese, Polish, Russian, Slovak, Slovenian, South Korean, Spanish, Turkish, simplified and traditional Chinese.

Tate's book is not directed exclusively to experts but rather a work of popularisation, and accessible for the lay public. An innovative point here is the focus on an "Eastern" point of view, many of the sources and quotes are from Arab historians of the time or Jews, without giving up European sources on the subject. In this way the author explores in this work both Arab and European points of view.

== Publications ==
- Jean-Pierre Sodini, Georges Tate, Bernard Bavant, Swantje Bavant, et al. introduction d'Ernest Will, Déhès (Syrie du nord) campagnes I-III (1976-1978) recherches sur l'habitat rural. Librairie orientaliste P. Geuthner, 1981
- L'Orient des Croisades, collection « Découvertes Gallimard » (nº 129), série Histoire. Éditions Gallimard, 1991 (new edition in 2008)
  - US edition – The Crusaders: Warriors of God, "Abrams Discoveries" series. Harry N. Abrams, 1996
  - UK edition – The Crusades and the Holy Land, 'New Horizons' series. Thames & Hudson, 1996 (reprinted 1997, 1999, 2007)
- Les campagnes de la Syrie du Nord, du II^{e} au VII^{e} siècle. Geuthner, 1992
- Les Croisés en Orient, Documentation française, 1993
- La Grèce antique, Hachette Éducation, coll. « Les fondamentaux », 2000
- Justinien, l'épopée de l'Empire d'Orient (527-565), Fayard, 2004
- Les Croisades vues à travers du film, cosupervised by Georges Tate, book included in the édition collector DVD of Kingdom of Heaven, 2005
