= Malek Alloula =

Algerian poet and writer (1937–2015)

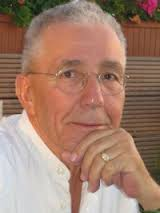
- Malek Alloula in 2013
- Born: November 3, 1937; Oran, Algeria
- Died: February 2015 (aged 77); Paris, France
- Education: École Normale Supérieure, Sorbonne
- Occupations: Writer, Poet, Literary Critic
- Spouse: Assia Djebar 1980-2005
- Writing career
- Language: French
- Subjects: Orientalism, post-colonialism
- Notable work: The Colonial Harem (1986)

Malek Alloula (1937–2015) was an Algerian poet, writer, editor, and literary critic.

He is chiefly notable for his poetry and essays on philosophy. He wrote several books, including Le Harem Colonial in 1981, translated into English as The Colonial Harem, which was generally well received. The author analyses colonial photographic postcards of Algerian women from the late 19th and early 20th centuries, arguing that the postcards do not accurately represent Algerian women, but rather a Frenchman's fantasy of the "Oriental" female.

== Biography ==
He was born November 3, 1937, in Oran, Algeria. Having graduated from the École Normale Supérieure, he further studied literature at the University of Algiers and La Sorbonne, Paris, where he wrote his doctoral thesis on Denis Diderot, a French philosopher and writer.

He married Assia Djebar, an Algerian filmmaker and novelist, in 1980; they divorced in 2005. He was the director of the Abdelkader Alloula Foundation, which honors his brother Abdelkader Alloula, a playwright and stage director who was assassinated in 1994 by members of Islamic Front for Armed Jihad.

== Bibliography ==
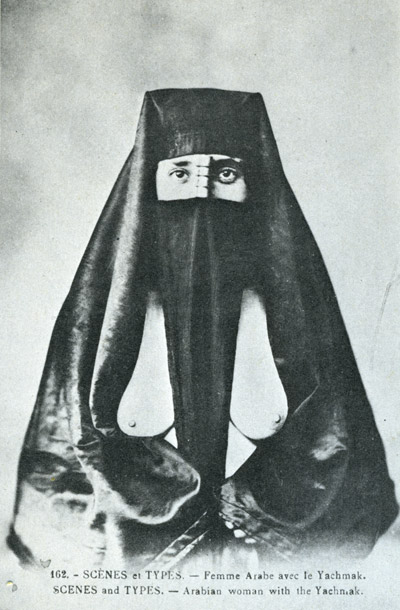
Photographf of an "Arab Woman with the yachmak" published in The Colonial Harem

Having become an editor in Paris in 1967, he continued writing poetry, essays on poetics, and philosophy, working in the French language. As a critic, he spoke against the appropriation of poetry in the service of the Algerian revolution, following the independence of Algeria from France in 1962.

Most of his essays and prose, infused with poetic touches, speak about Algerian culture, Algerian-Berber culture, food, and his childhood memories of his father, teachers, and friends. Among his various publications, the most influential is Le Harem Colonial (The Colonial Harem), which analyzes a collection of postcards displaying "exotic" images of Algerian women, photographed by French colonists and sent back to France. According to Alloula, this was done as a sign of conquest; he asserts that the postcards visually represent power relations between colonized and colonizer. The book provides commentary on the images, especially those depicting eroticized "scenes of Algerian women" during the French colonial regime. Between 1900 and 1930, French entrepreneurs produced postcards of Algerian women and circulated them in France. According to Alloula, this constitutes a French colonial projection of a world that never existed. He declares that, "Wanting to possess the Algerian land, French colonists first claimed the bodies of its women, using sex as a surrogate for an extension of another larger usurpation of culture." Alloula's book claims that these photographs were circulated as evidence of the exotic, backward, and strange customs of Algerians. According to Alloula, the Algerian women used in the images are not actually harem women, but rather orphans and prostitutes who were asked to pose for the photographer. Alloula denounces the voyeuristic perspective of the French on Algerian women; he claims the images are not representative of the real Algerian women, but rather of Western fantasies of the Oriental female and her inaccessibility in the forbidden harem.

=== Works ===
- Dans tout ce blanc Rhubarbe, Auxerre, Barzah Algiers 2015
- Algérie indépendance.
- Les festins de l'exil.
- Alger 1951: un pays dans l'attente.
- Une enfance algérienne.
- Rêveurs/sépultures; suivi de L'exercice des sens: poèmes.
- Belles Algériennes de Geiser.
- Villes et autres lieux: poèmes.
- L'accès au corps: poème.
- Villes (poems)
- Le cri de tarzan, la nuit dans un village oranais: nouvelles.
- Alger: photographiée au XIXe siècle.
- Approchant du seuil ils dirent.
- Mesures du vent: poème
- Le harem colonial: images d'un sous-érotisme.
- Causses et vallées.
- Villes et autres Leux: Poèmes.
- Paysages d'un retour.
- L'Exercice des sens.
- L'autre regard.
- Rêveurs-sépultures: suivi de Mesures du vent : poèmes.
