= Audie Award for Young Adult Title =

Annual literary award for young adult audiobooks

The Audie Award for Young Adult Title is one of the Audie Awards presented annually by the Audio Publishers Association (APA). It awards excellence in narration, production, and content for a young adult audiobook intended for children ages 13 to 18 released in a given year. From 2009 to 2015 the award was given as the Audie Award for Teen Title. Before 2009 it was given as the Audie Award for Children's Title for Ages Twelve and Up. It has been awarded since 2007, when it was separated from the more expansive Audie Award for Children's Title for Ages Eight and Up.

== Winners and finalists ==
=== 2000s ===
Year	Audiobook	Author(s)	Narrator(s)	Publisher	Result	Ref.
2007 12th	Airborn (2004)	Kenneth Oppel	David Kelly and full cast	Full Cast Audio	Winner	
2007 12th	Ark Angel (2005)	Anthony Horowitz	Simon Prebble	Recorded Books	Finalist	
2007 12th	Looking for Alaska (2005)	John Green	Jeff Woodman	Brilliance Audio	Finalist	
2007 12th	Sleeping Freshmen Never Lie (2005)	David Lubar	Ryan MacConnell and full cast	Full Cast Audio	Finalist	
2007 12th	The Goose Girl (2003)	Shannon Hale	Cynthia Bishop and full cast	Full Cast Audio	Finalist	
2008 13th	Bloody Jack (2002)	L.A. Meyer	Katherine Kellgren	Listen & Live Audio	Winner	
2008 13th	InterWorld (2007)	Neil Gaiman and Michael Reaves	Christopher Evan Welch	HarperAudio	Finalist	
2008 13th	A Mango-Shaped Space (2003)	Wendy Mass	Danielle Ferland	Recorded Books	Finalist	
2008 13th	M Is for Magic (2007)	Neil Gaiman	Neil Gaiman	HarperAudio	Finalist	
2008 13th	Slam (2007)	Nick Hornby	Nicholas Hoult	Penguin Audio	Finalist	
2009 14th	Curse of the Blue Tattoo (2004)	L.A. Meyer	Katherine Kellgren	Listen & Live Audio	Winner	
2009 14th	The Burn Journals (2004)	Brent Runyon	Christopher Evan Welch	Recorded Books	Finalist	
2009 14th	Fairest (2006)	Gail Carson Levine	Sarah Naughton	Full Cast Audio	Finalist	
2009 14th	Paper Towns (2008)	John Green	Dan John Miller	Brilliance Audio	Finalist	
2009 14th	The Compound (2008)	S. A. Bodeen	Christopher Lane	Brilliance Audio	Finalist	
2009 14th	The Uprising (2007)	Margaret P. Haddix	Suzanne Toren	Recorded Books	Finalist	

=== 2010s ===
Year	Audiobook	Author(s)	Narrator(s)	Publisher	Result	Ref.
2010 15th	Peace, Locomotion (2009)	Jacqueline Woodson	Dion Graham	Brilliance Audio	Winner	
2010 15th	Going Bovine (2009)	Libba Bray	Erik Davies	Listening Library	Finalist	
2010 15th	In the Belly of the Bloodhound (2006)	L. A. Meyer	Katherine Kellgren	Listen & Live Audio	Finalist	
2010 15th	Mississippi Jack (2007)	L. A. Meyer	Katherine Kellgren	Listen & Live Audio	Finalist	
2010 15th	Wintergirls (2009)	Laurie Halse Anderson	Jeannie Stith	Brilliance Audio	Finalist	
2011 16th	The Rock and the River (2009)	Kekla Magoon	Dion Graham	Brilliance Audio	Winner	
2011 16th	Will Grayson, Will Grayson (2010)	John Green and David Levithan	MacLeod Andrewsand Nick Podehl	Brilliance Audio	Finalist	
2011 16th	Zora and Me (2010)	Victoria Bond and T. R. Simon	Channie Waites	Brilliance Audio	Finalist	
2011 16th	Rapture of the Deep (2009)	L. A. Meyer	Katherine Kellgren	Listen & Live Audio	Finalist	
2011 16th	Here in Harlem (2004)	Walter Dean Myers	Walter Dean Myers, Muhammad Cunningham, Charles Turner, Robin Miles, Monica Patton, and Gail Nelson	Live Oak Media	Finalist	
2012 17th	The Wake of the Lorelei Lee (2010)	L. A. Meyer	Katherine Kellgren	Listen & Live Audio	Winner	
2012 17th	Beauty Queens (2011)	Libba Bray	Libba Bray	Scholastic Audio	Finalist	
2012 17th	Chime (2011)	Franny Billingsley	Susan Duerdan	Listening Library	Finalist	
2012 17th	Okay for Now (2011)	Gary D. Schmidt	Lincoln Hoppe	Listening Library	Finalist	
2012 17th	Pick-Up Game	Marc Aronson, Charles R. Smith, Jr., Walter Dean Myers, Bruce Brooks, Willie Perdomo, Sharon G. Flake, Robert Burleigh, Rita Williams-Garcia, Joseph Bruchac, Adam Rapp, and Robert Lipsyte	Dion Graham and Quincy Tyler Bernstine	Bernstine Brilliance Audio/Candlewick	Finalist	
2013 18th	The Fault in Our Stars (2012)	John Green	Kate Rudd	Brilliance Audio	Winner	
2013 18th	The Diviners (2012)	Libba Bray	January LaVoy	Listening Library	Finalist	
2013 18th	Dodger (2012)	Terry Pratchett	Stephen Briggs	HarperAudio	Finalist	
2013 18th	Enchanted (2012)	Alethea Kontis	Katherine Kellgren	Brilliance Audio	Finalist	
2013 18th	Inheritance (2011)	Christopher Paolini	Gerard Doyle	Listening Library	Finalist	
2014 19th	Viva Jacquelina! (2012)	L. A. Meyer	Katherine Kellgren	Listen & Live	Winner	
2014 19th	Eleanor & Park (2012)	Rainbow Rowell	Rebecca Lowman and Sunil Malhotra	Listening Library	Finalist	
2014 19th	Far Far Away (2013)	Tom McNeal	W. Morgan Sheppard	Listening Library	Finalist	
2014 19th	Forgive Me, Leonard Peacock (2017)	Matthew Quick	Noah Galvin	Hachette Audio	Finalist	
2014 19th	Rose Under Fire (2013)	Elizabeth Wein	Sasha Pick	Bolinda Audio	Finalist	
2015 20th	Egg and Spoon (2014)	Gregory Maguire	Michael Page	Brilliance Audio	Winner	
2015 20th	The Accidental Highwayman (2014)	Ben Tripp	Steve West	Macmillan Audio	Finalist	
2015 20th	Boston Jacky (2013)	L. A. Meyer	Katherine Kellgren	Listen & Live Audio	Finalist	
2015 20th	Cress (2014)	Marissa Meyer	Rebecca Soler	Macmillan Audio	Finalist	
2015 20th	Curtsies & Conspiracies (2013)	Gail Carriger	Moira Quirk	Hachette Audio	Finalist	
2015 20th	The Impossible Knife of Memory (2014)	Laurie Halse Anderson	Julia Whelan and Luke Daniels	Brilliance Audio	Finalist	
2016 21st	Lair of Dreams	Libba Bray	January LaVoy	Listening Library/Penguin Random House	Winner	
2016 21st	All the Bright Places (2014)	Jennifer Niven	Kirby Heyborne, Ariadne Meyers, and Jennifer Niven	Listening Library/Penguin Random House	Finalist	
2016 21st	The Sleeper and the Spindle	Neil Gaiman	Julian Rhind-Tutt, Lara Pulver, Niamh Walsh, Adjoa Andoh, Peter Forbes, John Sessions, and Michael Maloney	HarperAudio	Finalist	
2016 21st	Unbroken	Laura Hillenbrand	Edward Herrmann	Listening Library/Penguin Random House	Finalist	
2016 21st	The Winter Horses	Philip Kerr	James Langton	Tantor Media	Finalist	
2016 21st	X	Ilyasah Shabazz and Kekla Magoon	Dion Graham and Ilyasah Shabazz	Brilliance Audio	Finalist	
2017 22nd	Salt to the Sea	Ruta Sepetys	Jorjeana Marie, Will Damron, Cassandra Morris, and Michael Crouch	Listening Library	Winner	
2017 22nd	The Game of Love and Death	Martha Brockenbrough	Susan Hanfield	Scholastic Audio	Finalist	
2017 22nd	Gemina	Amie Kaufman and Jay Kristoff	Carla Corvo, Steve West, and a full cast	Listening Library	Finalist	
2017 22nd	My Lady Jane	Cynthia Hand, Brodi Ashton, and Jodi Meadows	Katherine Kellgren	HarperAudio	Finalist	
2017 22nd	Stalking Jack the Ripper	Kerri Maniscalco and James Patterson	Nicola Barber	Hachette Audio	Finalist	
2017 22nd	Winter	Marissa Meyer	Rebecca Soler	Macmillan Audio		
2018 23rd	The Hate U Give (2017)	Angie Thomas	Bahni Turpin	HarperAudio	Winner	
2018 23rd	Before the Devil Breaks You (2017)	Libba Bray	January LaVoy	Listening Library	Finalist	
2018 23rd	Disappeared (2017)	Francisco X. Stork	Roxana Ortega and Christian Barillas	Scholastic Audio	Finalist	
2018 23rd	Solo (2017)	Kwame Alexander and Mary Rand Hess	Kwame Alexander	Blink	Finalist	
2018 23rd	You Bring the Distant Near (2017)	Mitali Perkins	Sneha Mathan, Shivali Bhammer, Priya Ayyar, and a full cast	Listening Library	Finalist	
2019 24th	Sadie (2018)	Courtney Summers	Dan Bittner, Rebecca Soler, Gabra Zackman, and Fred Berman	Macmillan Audio	Winner	
2019 24th	Children of Blood and Bone (2018)	Tomi Adeyemi	Bahni Turpin	Macmillan Audio	Finalist	
2019 24th	Far from the Tree (2012)	Robin Benway	Julia Whelan	HarperAudio	Finalist	
2019 24th	The Lady's Guide to Petticoats and Piracy (2018)	Mackenzi Lee	Moira Quirk	HarperAudio	Finalist	
2019 24th	The Poet X (2018)	Elizabeth Acevedo	Elizabeth Acevedo	HarperAudio	Finalist	
2019 24th	The Stars at Oktober Bend (2016)	Glenda Millard	Candice Moll and Ron Butler	Brilliance Audio	Finalist	

=== 2020s ===
Year	Audiobook	Author(s)	Narrator(s)	Publisher	Result	Ref.
2020 25th	Hey, Kiddo (2018)	Jarrett J. Krosoczka	Jarrett J. Krosoczka, Jeanne Birdsall, and full cast	Scholastic Audio	Winner	
2020 25th	Like a Love Story (2019)	Abdi Nazemian	Lauren Ambrose, Vikas Adam, and Michael Crouch	HarperAudio	Finalist	
2020 25th	Lovely War (2019)	Julie Berry	Julie Berry, Jayne Entwistle, Allan Corduner, Dion Graham, Fiona Hardingham, John Lee, Nathaniel Parker, and Steve West	Penguin Random House Audio	Finalist	
2020 25th	On the Come Up (2019)	Angie Thomas	Bahni Turpin	HarperAudio	Finalist	
2020 25th	With the Fire on High (2010)	Elizabeth Acevedo	Elizabeth Acevedo	HarperAudio	Finalist	
2021 26th	Clap When You Land (2020)	Elizabeth Acevedo	Elizabeth Acevedo and Melania-Luisa Marte	HarperAudio	Winner	
2021 26th	Everything Sad Is Untrue (2020)	Daniel Nayeri	Daniel Nayeri	Penguin Random House Audio	Finalist	
2021 26th	Poisoned (2020)	Jennifer Donnelly	Rosie Jones	Scholastic Audio	Finalist	
2021 26th	A Song Below Water (2020)	Bethany C. Morrow	Jennifer Haralson and Andrea Laing	Macmillan Audio	Finalist	
2021 26th	This Is My America (2020)	Kim Johnson	Bahni Turpin	Penguin Random House Audio	Finalist	
2022 27th	Be Dazzled	Ryan La Sala	Pete Cross	Dreamscape Media	Winner	
2022 27th	Firekeeper's Daughter (2021)	Angeline Boulley	Isabella Star LaBlanc	Macmillan Audio	Finalist	
2022 27th	The Prison Healer	Lynette Noni	Jeanette Illidge	HarperAudio	Finalist	
2022 27th	The Project	Courtney Summers	Thérèse Plummer and Emily Shaffer	Macmillan Audio	Finalist	
2022 27th	A Sitting in St. James	Rita Williams-Garcia	Machelle Williams	HarperAudio	Finalist	
2023 28th	Demon in the Wood	Leigh Bardugo	Ben Barnes, Benjamin Valic, Cassandra Morris, Eason Rytter, James Fouhey, Mary McCartney, Matt Leisy, Salli Saffioti, Sean Gormley, and Tom Bromhead	Macmillan Audio	Winner	
2023 28th	The Drowned Woods	Emily Lloyd-Jones	Moira Quirk	Hachette Audio	Finalist	
2023 28th	Love Radio	Ebony LaDelle	Joniece Abbott-Pratt and JaQwan J. Kelly	Simon & Schuster Audio	Finalist	
2023 28th	Loveless	Alice Oseman	Billie Fulford-Brown, Elizabeth Schenk, and Imogen Church	Scholastic Audio	Finalist	
2023 28th	The Summer of Bitter and Sweet (2022)	Jen Ferguson	Julie Lumsden	HarperAudio	Finalist	
2024 29th	This Terrible True Thing	Jenny Laden	Gail Shalan	Blackstone Publishing	Winner	
2024 29th	Beholder	Ryan La Sala	Vikas Adam	Scholastic Audio	Finalist	
2024 29th	One Night in a Thousand Years	Craig Cunningham	James Van Der Beek	Kent Studio	Finalist	
2024 29th	Savi and the Memory Keeper	Bijal Vachharajani	Soneela Nankani	Blackstone Publishing	Finalist	
2024 29th	Stolen Heir	Holly Black	Saskia Maarleveld	Hachette Audio	Finalist	
2024 29th	This Winter: A Heartstopper Novella	Alice Oseman	Jenny Walser, Joe Jameson, and Aaron Barashi	Scholastic Audio	Finalist	
2025 30th	The Real Education of TJ Crowley: Coming of Age on the Redline	Grant Overstake and May Wuthrich	Dani Martineck, Dion Graham, and a full cast	Grain Valley Publishing/Blackstone	Winner	
2025 30th	Flamboyants	George M. Johnson	George M. Johnson	Macmillan Audio	Finalist	
2025 30th	Gamer Girls: Out of Control	Andrea Towers	Jensen Olaya	Simon & Schuster Audio	Finalist	
2025 30th	Heir	Sabaa Tahir	Vidish Athavale, Esme Lonsdale, Joe Pitts, Marco Young, and Rachel Petladwala	Penguin Random House Audio	Finalist	
2025 30th	Homebody	Theo Parish	Roly Botha, Anabel Baldwin, and George Naylor	HarperAudio	Finalist	
2026 31st	Under the Same Stars	Libba Bray	Jeremy Carlisle Parker, January LaVoy, and Major Curda	Macmillan Audio	Winner	
2026 31st	Lady or the Tiger	Heather M. Herrman	Sophie Amoss	Penguin Random House Audio	Finalist	
2026 31st	The Otherwhere Post	Emily J. Taylor	Barrie Kreinik	Penguin Random House Audio	Finalist	
2026 31st	The Scammer	Tiffany D. Jackson	January LaVoy	HarperAudio	Finalist	
2026 31st	Sunrise on the Reaping (2025)	Suzanne Collins	Jefferson White	Scholastic Audio	Finalist	
