= Under the Jolly Roger =

2005 novel by L.A. Meyer

- First edition cover
- Author: Louis A. Meyer
- Audio read by: Katherine Kellgren
- Cover artist: Cliff Nielsen
- Language: English
- Genre: Young adult, Historical novel
- Publisher: Harcourt Children's Books
- Publication date: August 1, 2005
- Media type: Print (Hardback, Paperback), Audiobook
- Pages: 528 pages
- ISBN: 978-0-15-205345-1
- OCLC: 56752775
- LC Class: PZ7.M57172 Un 2005
- Preceded by: Curse of the Blue Tattoo
- Followed by: In the Belly of the Bloodhound

Under the Jolly Roger: Being an Account of the Further Nautical Adventures of Jacky Faber is a young adult historical fiction novel by L.A. Meyer and is the third book in the Bloody Jack series set in the early 19th century.

Under the Jolly Roger is preceded by Bloody Jack (2002) and Curse of the Blue Tattoo (2004). It is followed by In the Belly of the Bloodhound (2006), Mississippi Jack (2007), My Bonny Light Horseman (2008), and Rapture of the Deep (2009), The Wake of the Lorelei Lee (2010), The Mark of the Golden Dragon (2011), Viva Jacquelina! (2012), Boston Jacky (2013), and Wild Rover No More (2016).

== Plot summary ==
After leaving Lawson Peabody, a boarding school in Boston, Jacky joins the whaling ship, the Pequod, as a companion to the Captain's wife, a teacher for the Captain's son, and as the cook's helper. Jacky leaves the ship when it arrives in London and searches for Jaimy. She goes to Jaimy's house on Nine Brattle Lane, where Jaimy's mother throws Jacky out and tells her Jaimy is no longer in love with her. She is confused until the family maid, named Hattie, tells her not to believe her and that Jaimy will be at the races at Epsom Downs. Jacky sets off to find him. In the meantime, Jacky visits her old gangs kip under the Blackfriar's bridge. She doesn't recognize any of the kids and they tell her what happened to the other members of the gang. They tell her a former member, Judy was hired to be a helper to an older woman, and despite her promises, has not come back to help the gang. Thinking that was odd, Jacky goes to visit her and discovers Judy is being forced to work at a wash house for a terrible man. Jacky saves Judy. Jacky takes Judy in as her maid and buys her all new clothes. Jacky dresses as a jock in order to get into a racetrack, where Jaimy is. She sees Jaimy with his cousin Emily and mistakenly thinks that Jaimy has replaced her.

She runs away and is captured by a press-gang who mistake her for a boy and take her aboard a ship, HMS Wolverine, where Jacky furiously reveals that she is a girl. Instead of sending her back, the captain keeps her around, wanting to have a night of sport with her. Jacky, knowing what the Captain has in mind, jumps from the ship into the sea, in an attempt to swim to safety. As Jacky is swimming, the Captain of the Wolverine sends out a small boat to retrieve her. As the boat creeps up on her, Jacky tries to stop them by going under water and pulling at an oar, causing a sailor to fall out. She thinks this will cause them to slow down and save the man, but instead they just keep going. Jacky can't let the sailor die, so she dives down and saves him. When she does this the other men grab her and pull her aboard.

When back on the ship, Jacky tells the Captain that if she is to be entered into the books then she shall be put it as midshipman, since she was made midshipman while on the Dolphin. After she was put into the books, Jacky settles into the midshipman's berth. There she meets the other midshipman, Georgie Piggott, about eight years old, Ned Barrow and Tom Wheeler, both twelve years old, and Robin Raeburne, about sixteen years old.

Meanwhile, Jaimy has written a letter to Jacky, explaining the events at the track. Jaimy tells that the girl Jacky saw was actually his cousin Emily, who likes to make other men jealous by going into town with Jaimy. Jaimy says he is still hers.

Jacky attempts to begin training the midshipmen. To begin this Jacky puts the midshipmen onto the ship's watch. Jacky also goes to the officers to be assigned a division. She is put with gun crew, Division One on the port bow guns. Jacky goes to the division and learns they have never even fired the guns. She assigns the men their jobs and drills the men on dry runs.

The book again turns to a letter from Jaimy to Jacky. Jaimy says how Judy shows up on his doorstep. Jacky had told her if she did not return to go to Jaimy's house, since she thought she and Jaimy would be together. Judy tells Jaimy how his mother had thrown Jacky out of the house and told her Jaimy no longer loved her. Jaimy is outraged and goes to his mother and has Judy tell the story. His mother hears how the maid, Hattie, told Jacky where Jaimy would be and tells her to leave. Hattie is mad that she would throw her out after many years of service and tells Jaimy to look in one of his mother's drawers. In the drawer Jaimy finds letter to and from Jacky. This makes Jaimy very mad, and tells her that he is leaving, which is what he did, along with Judy and Hattie.

During an early morning watch, Jacky notices a flashing light from the shore. She is told that they occur about every week. They don't know what they mean but they are supposed to tell the Captain when the lights occur. While on watch Jacky goes about and inspects the ship. She goes up the foremast to check on the lookout. There she meets Joseph Jared, the Captain of the top. He tells her he is a friend of Billy, the sailor she saved on the first day. Jared also tells her that the ship does not stop ships from passing through the blockade.

One night, Jacky is on the watch when a storm comes, which she calls a living gale. Jacky looks up and sees the forestaysail chafing. If it breaks the ship will be lost. Jacky runs from the quarterdeck and climbs to the line and fixes it. Jacky decides to climb even higher to make sure not anymore line is chafing, even though that's Jared's job. When she gets there a huge wave comes over the deck. Jacky holds on to the mast, but she knows the wave will tear her away. When she thinks she is lost Jared comes from behind and holds her down, saving her.

The Captain sends the officers away in a small boat when the captain decides he wants to sleep with Jacky. She tries to offer herself to a fellow midshipman, Robin, wanting her first time to be willing and happy instead of in fear. However they are interrupted and Jacky is sent to the Captain's cabin. A member of the crew, wanting to protect Jacky, begins dropping cannonballs from the rigging on to the quarterdeck. This enrages the Captain, it being a beginning act of mutiny. He orders the person to be captured, and it is revealed to be Robin. When the Captain tries to have his way with Jacky, he has a heart attack and dies.

At first, Jacky pretends that the Captain is too sick to leave his cabin. She realizes that she is now Captain of the ship, all the sailors ranking above her having been sent off in a small boat, never to be heard from again in the book. She then slowly assumes command of the "Wolverine" by pretending her orders are the dead Captain's. After a few days Jacky tells the crew of the Captain's death. After the Captain's death, Jacky discovers that the Captain has been taking bribes to let ships pass through the blockade. She soon uncovers a smuggling ring, which included smuggling out French spies. Jacky takes control of the ship, which includes releasing Robin and placing Joseph Jared, a sailor that Jacky befriended, as one of her officers. She and her crew take several French ships as prizes and Jacky earns a reputation as La belle jeune fille sans merci, or "the beautiful young girl without mercy". Soon she is removed from her position as captain, but manages to escape on one of the captured ships, the Emerald, which she makes her own. She tries to hide from the Admiralty the fact that she captured the Emerald.

Along with Higgins, a steward from the Wolverine, Jacky travels to Ireland and finds her former sea dad, Liam Delaney and offers him the role as Captain of the Emerald, while she remains owner of the ship. He accepts and together they find a crew and begin privateering. Jacky becomes close friends with Liam's daughter, Mairead. They become very wealthy and prosperous and Jacky's reputation grows. When the Emerald is at a port in England Jacky is relaxing in the countryside and an older man approaches her. The man turns out to be Jacky's grandfather. This is the first family Jacky has had since the dark day when her parents and sister died and she was forced out on the street. Though Jacky has acquired a letter of marque by revealing the smuggling ring to the Admiralty, the latter brands her as a pirate when they learn she kept the Emerald for her own use. Later, she is briefly reunited with Jaimy who is a lieutenant aboard the Wolverine, which captures and sinks the Emerald. The two rekindle their relationship; however, the Wolverine becomes engaged in the Battle of Trafalgar where Jacky escapes the brig and takes part in the fighting. When all is over, she requests to stay and help doctor many of her former shipmates who had been injured, but the Captain sets her free for her bravery in battle. She then signals Jamie to meet her in Boston before sailing away in a small boat.

== Characters ==
- Mary 'Jacky' Faber: The protagonist of the story. Jacky is press-ganged onto the Wolverine.
- James 'Jaimy' Fletcher: Jacky's love. In the beginning he is believed to have moved on from Jacky, but this is proven not to be the case later in the book.
- Captain Trumbull: Captain of the Wolverine after the death of Scroggs; turns Jacky's former ship against her after she is accused of piracy.
- Abraham Scroggs: Captain of the Wolverine. In the pocket of the French, Scroggs allows enemy ships to pass, much to the chagrin of his crew, who constantly threaten mutiny and finally go through with it when he threatens Jacky.
- Liam Delaney: Jacky's "sea dad" with whom she reunites when she gains command of her own ship.
- Mairead Delaney: Liam's rebellious and free-spirited daughter, who gains freedom when she stows away aboard the Emerald.
- John Higgins: Jacky's housekeeper aboard the Emerald. Higgins is homosexual, and teaches Jacky plenty about prejudice and the words she haphazardly uses to describe those of different origins.
- Joseph Jared: Jacky's mate on board the Wolverine and the first "real man" she kisses. Saves Jacky's life by shooting a French spy.
- Robin Raeburn: Midshipman on the Wolverine with whom Jacky has a brief affair.
- Georgie Piggott: Ship's boy on board the Wolverine whom Jacky takes under her wing. Injured during the Battle of Trafalgar.

== Reception ==
Kirkus Reviews referred to the novel's main character, Jacky, as "plucky, smart and like all real heroes, good at everything she puts her hand to".

Booklist also reviewed the novel.

== Accolades ==
Under the Jolly Roger is a Junior Library Guild book.

The American Library Association included the audiobook on their 2009 list of Amazing Audiobooks for Young Adults.
