= Odyssey Award =

Annual award for audiobooks

- Awarded for: the year's best English-language audiobook for children or young adults
- Country: United States
- Presented by: Association for Library Service to Children and Young Adult Library Services Association, divisions of ALA
- First award: 2008
- Website: ala.org/alsc/awardsgrants/bookmedia/odysseyaward ala.org/yalsa/odyssey

The Odyssey Award for Excellence in Audiobook Production is an annual award conferred by the American Library Association (ALA) upon the publisher of "the best audiobook produced for children and/or young adults, available in English in the United States". It is jointly administered by two ALA divisions (Association for Library Service to Children (ALSC) and Young Adult Library Services Association (YALSA)) and sponsored by Booklist magazine. It recognizes production quality in all respects, considering such things as narration, sound quality, background music and sound effects. It is named for Homer's eighth century BCE epic poem Odyssey, which was transmitted orally, to remind modern people of the ancient roots of storytelling.

The award was inaugurated in 2008.

For many reasons indicated in the 2008 manifesto, "it is essential for ALSC and YALSA to provide the same level of support for this nonprint format that they have historically provided for print materials, by creating an annual award for the best audiobooks in the field."

== Criteria ==
Source: "Eligibility & Criteria"

- All literary genres are eligible for consideration, including read-alongs.
- The Committee will consider and vote on titles published within their assigned calendar year, January 1 to October 31, in addition to those published between November 1 and December 31 of the previous year. A title may only be submitted once and cannot be reconsidered the next year.
- Audiobooks produced previously in another audio format are ineligible for consideration.
- The audiobook is intended for either young adults or children, who are defined as persons up to and including age 18; works for this entire age range are to be considered. Adult titles are ineligible.
- Audiobooks featuring single or full cast narration are eligible.
- Audiobooks previously published in another country are eligible presuming they have also been distributed in the United States during the term of eligibility.
- Only audiobooks produced in English are considered, but this requirement does not limit the use of words or phrases in another language where appropriate in context.
- If no title is deemed sufficiently meritorious, no award will be given that year.
- The chair, with assistance from designated ALSC or YALSA staff, is responsible for verifying the eligibility of all nominated titles.
- The award will be presented to the producers of the audiobooks.

== Recipients ==
In each of the fifteen cycles to 2022, at least one title has been named an Honor Audiobook with five being the greatest number of Honors (2008, 2009, 2018) and one being the fewest (2016). Beginning in the 2022 award-year, two titles may be named Winners, one for Excellence in Audiobook Production for Children, and one for Excellence in Audiobook Production for Young Adults.

Odyssey Award winners and honor audiobooks
Year	Author	Title	Producer	Narrator	Citation
2008	Walter Dean Myers	Jazz	Live Oak Media	James "D-Train" Williams, Vaneese Thomas	Winner
2008	L. A. Meyer	Bloody Jack (Note: The table gives full titles except for three Jacky Faber books written by L. A. Meyer, narrated by Katherine Kellgren, and produced by Listen & Live Audio: 2008 Honor, Bloody Jack: Being an Account of the Curious Adventures of Mary "Jacky" Faber, Ship's Boy 2009 Honor, Curse of the Blue Tattoo: Being an Account of the Misadventures of Jacky Faber, Midshipman and Fine Lady 2010 Honor, In the Belly of the Bloodhound: Being an Account of a Particularly Peculiar Adventure in the Life of Jacky Faber)	Listen & Live Audio	Katherine Kellgren	Honor
2008	Doreen Cronin	Dooby Dooby Moo	Scholastic / Weston Woods Studios	Randy Travis	Honor
2008	J. K. Rowling	Harry Potter and the Deathly Hallows	Listening Library	Jim Dale	Honor
2008	Derek Landy	Skulduggery Pleasant	HarperCollins Children's Audio	Rupert Degas	Honor
2008	Robert Louis Stevenson	Treasure Island	Listening Library	Alfred Molina	Honor
2009	Sherman Alexie	The Absolutely True Diary of a Part-Time Indian	Recorded Books	Sherman Alexie	Winner
2009	L. A. Meyer	Curse of the Blue Tattoo	Listen & Live Audio	Katherine Kellgren	Honor
2009	Christopher Paul Curtis	Elijah of Buxton	Listening Library	Mirron Willis	Honor
2009	Kate McMullan; Jim McMullan	I'm Dirty	Scholastic Media / Weston Woods Studios	Steve Buscemi	Honor
2009	Carmen Agra Deedy	Martina the Beautiful Cockroach: A Cuban Folktale	Peachtree Publishers	Carmen Agra Deedy	Honor
2009	Terry Pratchett	Nation	HarperAudio	Stephen Briggs	Honor
2010	Kate DiCamillo	Louise, the Adventures of a Chicken	Live Oak Media	Barbara Rosenblat	Winner
2010	L. A. Meyer	In the Belly of the Bloodhound	Listen & Live Audio	Katherine Kellgren	Honor
2010	Jacqueline Woodson	Peace, Locomotion	Brilliance Audio	Dion Graham	Honor
2010	Kadir Nelson	We Are the Ship: The Story of Negro Baseball	Brilliance Audio	Dion Graham	Honor
2011	Adam Rex	The True Meaning of Smekday	Listening Library	Bahni Turpin	Winner
2011	Karen Cushman	Alchemy and Meggy Swann	Listening Library	Katherine Kellgren	Honor
2011	Patrick Ness	The Knife of Never Letting Go	Brilliance Audio	Nick Podehl	Honor
2011	Jennifer Donnelly	Revolution	Listening Library	Emily Janice Card	Honor
2011	John Green; David Levithan	Will Grayson, Will Grayson	Brilliance Audio	MacLeod Andrews	Honor
2012	Daniel Kraus	Rotters	Listening Library	Kirby Heyborne	Winner
2012	G. Neri	Ghetto Cowboy	Brilliance Audio	JD Jackson	Honor
2012	Gary D. Schmidt	Okay for Now	Listening Library	Lincoln Hoppe	Honor
2012	Maggie Stiefvater	The Scorpio Races	Scholastic Audio Books	Steve West; Fiona Hardingham	Honor
2012	Cynthia Voigt	Young Fredle	Listening Library	Wendy Carter	Honor
2013	John Green	The Fault in Our Stars	Brilliance Audio	Kate Rudd	Winner
2013	Eoin Colfer	Artemis Fowl and the Last Guardian	Listening Library	Nathaniel Parker	Honor
2013	Cornelia Funke	Ghost Knight	Listening Library	Elliot Hill	Honor
2013	Elizabeth Fama	Monstrous Beauty	Macmillan Audio	Katherine Kellgren	Honor
2014	Daniel Kraus	Scowler	Listening Library	Kirby Heyborne	Winner
2014	Tim Federle	Better Nate Than Ever	Simon & Schuster Audio	Tim Federle	Honor
2014	Aaron Reynolds	Creepy Carrots!	Weston Woods Studios	James Naughton	Honor
2014	Rainbow Rowell	Eleanor & Park	Listening Library	Rebecca Lowman and Sunil Malhotra	Honor
2014	Roald Dahl	Matilda	Penguin Audio	Kate Winslet	Honor
2015	Christopher Myers	H.O.R.S.E. A Game of Basketball and Imagination	Live Oak Media	Dion Graham and Christopher Myers	Winner
2015	Tim Federle	Five, Six, Seven, Nate!	Audioworks division of Simon & Schuster Audio	Tim Federle	Honor
2015	Julie Berry	The Scandalous Sisterhood of Prickwillow Place	Listening Library	Jayne Entwistle	Honor
2015	Natalie Lloyd	A Snicker of Magic	Scholastic Audio	Cassandra Morris	Honor
2016	Kimberly Brubaker Bradley	The War That Saved My Life	Listening Library	Jayne Entwistle	Winner
2016	Pam Muñoz Ryan	Echo	Scholastic Audio	Mark Bramhall, David de Vries, MacLeod Andrews, Rebecca Soler	Honor
2017	Gavriel Savit	Anna and the Swallow Man	Listening Library	Allan Corduner	Winner
2017	Emma Shevah	Dream On, Amber	Recorded Books	Laura Kirman	Honor
2017	Jason Reynolds	Ghost	Simon & Schuster Audio	Guy Lockard	Honor
2017	ND Stevenson	Nimona	HarperAudio	Rebecca Soler, Jonathan Davis, Marc Thompson, January LaVoy, Natalie Gold, Peter Bradbury and David Pittu	Honor
2018	Angie Thomas	The Hate U Give	HarperAudio	Bahni Turpin	Winner
2018	Philip Pullman	The Book of Dust: La Belle Sauvage	Listening Library	Michael Sheen	Honor
2018	Matt Haig	A Boy Called Christmas	Listening Library	Stephen Fry	Honor
2018	Jason Reynolds	Long Way Down	Simon & Schuster Audio	Jason Reynolds	Honor
2018	Troy “Trombone Shorty” Andrews	Trombone Shorty	Live Oak Media	Dion Graham	Honor
2018	Cressida Cowell	The Wizards of Once	Hachette Audio	David Tennant	Honor
2019	Courtney Summers	Sadie	Macmillan Audio	Rebecca Soler, Fred Berman, Dan Bittner, Gabra Zackman, and more	Winner
2019	Carson Ellis	Du Iz Tak?	Weston Woods Studios	Eli D’Amico, Sebastian D’Amico, Burton Fott, Galen Fott, Laura Fott, Sarah Hart, Bella Higginbotham, Evelyn Hipp, and Brian Hull	Honor
2019	Susan Wood	Esquivel! Space-Age Sound Artist	Live Oak Media	Brian Amador	Honor
2019	Varian Johnson	The Parker Inheritance	Scholastic Audio	Cherise Booth	Honor
2019	Elizabeth Acevedo	The Poet X	HarperAudio	Elizabeth Acevedo	Honor
2020	Jarrett J. Krosoczka	Hey, Kiddo: How I Lost My Mother, Found My Father, and Dealt with Family Addiction	Scholastic Audio	Jarrett J. Krosoczka, Jeanne Birdsall, Jenna Lamia, Richard Ferrone and more	Winner
2020	K.A. Holt	Redwood and Ponytail	Hachette Audio	Cassandra Morris and Tessa Netting	Honor
2020	Lynne Kelly	Song for a Whale	Listening Library	Abigail Revasch with Lynne Kelly	Honor
2020	Traci Sorell	We Are Grateful: Otsaliheliga	Live Oak Media	Lauren Hummingbird, Agalisiga (Choogie) Mackey, Ryan Mackey, Traci Sorell, Tonia Weavel	Honor
2020	Geoff Rodkey	We're Not from Here	Listening Library	Dani Martineck	Honor
2021	Deborah Wiles	Kent State	Scholastic Audio	Christopher Gebauer, Lauren Ezzo, Christina DeLaine, Johnny Heller, Roger Wayne, Korey Jackson, and David de Vries	Winner
2021	Elizabeth Acevedo	Clap When You Land	HarperAudio	Elizabeth Acevedo and Melania-Luisa Marte	Honor
2021	Kimberly Brubaker Bradley	Fighting Words	Listening Library	Bahni Turpin	Honor
2021	Jason Reynolds	Stamped: Racism, Antiracism, and You	Hachette Audio	Jason Reynolds	Honor
2021	Victoria Jamieson and Omar Mohamed	When Stars Are Scattered	Listening Library	Faysal Ahmed, Barkhad Abdi and a full cast	Honor
2022	C. G. Esperanza	Boogie Boogie, Ya'll	HarperAudio	C. G. Esperanza	Winner (Children)
2022	Pamela N. Harris	When You Look Like Us	HarperAudio	Preston Butler III	Winner (Young Adults)
2022	Laurie Ann Thompson	Emmanuel’s Dream: The True Story of Emmanuel Ofosu Yeboah	Listening Library	Adjoa Andoh	Honor
2022	Jordan Scott	I Talk Like a River	Dreamscape Media	Jordan Scott	Honor
2022	Olivia Abtahi	Perfectly Parvin	Listening Library	Mitra Jouhari	Honor
2023	Jason Reynolds	Stuntboy, In the Meantime	Simon & Schuster Audio	Guy Lockard, Nile Bullock and Angel Pean with a full cast	Winner (Children)
2023	Ryan La Sala	The Honeys	Scholastic Audio	Pete Cross	Winner (Young Adults)
2023	Mac Barnett	The Three Billy Goats Gruff	Weston Woods Studios and Scholastic Audio	Mac Barnett	Honor
2023	Leigh Bardugo, adaptation by Garet Scott	Demon in the Wood Graphic Novel	Macmillan Audio	Ben Barnes and a full cast	Honor
2023	Elizabeth Acevedo	Inheritance: A Visual Poem	HarperAudio	Elizabeth Acevedo	Honor
2023	Jarrett J. Krosoczka	The First Helping (Lunch Lady Books 1 & 2)	Listening Library	Kate Flannery, Jarrett J. Krosoczka, and a full cast	Honor
2024	Cece Bell	El Deafo	Listening Library	Full cast	Winner (Children)
2024	Nick Brooks	Promise Boys	Macmillan Young Listeners	Full cast	Winner (Young Adults)
2024	Grace Lin	Chinese Menu: The History, Myths, and Legends Behind Your Favorite Foods	Hachette Audio	Lisa Ling	Honor
2024	Pedro Martín	Mexikid: A Graphic Memoir	Penguin Random House Audio	Full cast	Honor
2024	Kiyash Monsef	Once There Was	Simon & Schuster Audio	Nikki Massoud	Honor
2024	Lucy Strange	Sisters of the Lost Marsh	Scholastic Audio	Lucy Strange	Honor
2024	Elizabeth Wein	Stateless	Hachette Audio	Moira Quirk	Honor
2025	Erin Frankel	A Plate of Hope: The Inspiring Story of Chef José Andrés and World Central Kitchen	Andy T. Jones for Dreamscape	Luis Carlos de La Lombana	Winner (Children)
2025	Tony Keith Jr.	How the Boogeyman Became a Poet	Abigail Marks for HarperAudio	Tony Keith Jr.	Winner (Young Adults)
2025	Renée Watson	Black Girl You Are Atlas	Brian Ramcharan for Listening Library	Renée Watson	Honor
2025	Brian Bliss	Dispatches from Parts Unknown	Almeda Beynon for HarperAudio	Joy Nash	Honor
2025	Melanie Sumrow	Girls Like Her	Abigail Marks for HarperAudio	Melanie Sumrow and January LaVoy	Honor
2025	Margaret O’Hair and Sofia Sanchez	You Are Brave	Paul Gagne and John Pels for Scholastic Audio	Sofia Sanchez	Honor
2026	Traci Sorell and Joseph Erb	Clack, Clack! Smack! A Cherokee Stickball Story	Arnie Cardillo with Traci Sorell for Live Oak Media	Traci Sorell with full cast	Winner (Children)
2026	Alex L. Combs and Andrew Eakett	Trans History: From Ancient Times to the Present Day	Iris McElroy and Juan García Ticoulat for Listening Library/Penguin Random House Audio	Alex L. Combs, Andrew Eakett with full cast	Winner (Young Adults)
2026	Ryan La Sala	The Dead of Summer	Zane Birdwell and Paul Gagne for Scholastic Audio	Pete Cross and A’rese Emokpae	Honor
2026	Cynthia Leitich Smith	Legendary Frybread Drive-In: Intertribal Stories	Sydney Mathieu for Heartdrum/HarperCollins	Full cast	Honor
2026	Jason Reynolds	Soundtrack	Dan Zitt and Brian Ramcharan for Listening Library/Penguin Random House Audio	Full cast	Honor
2026	James Robinson and	Whale Eyes: A Memoir About Seeing and Being Seen	Iris McElroy and Olivia Langen for Listening Library/Penguin Random House Audio	James Robinson	Honor

== Multiple awards ==
Listening Library has won 5 awards, Harper has won 4, and Live Oak Media and Scholastic have each won 3.

Katherine Kellgren is the narrator of the most Odyssey-honored titles at five Honor Audiobooks, including three written by L. A. Meyer and produced by Listen & Live Audio — the first, second, and fourth Jacky Faber books.

2009

Sherman Alexie, author and narrator of the 2009 Odyssey Award-winning audiobook, The Absolutely True Diary of a Part-Time Indian, also won the annual National Book Award for Young People's Literature for the print edition of that book (Little, Brown Books for Young Readers, September 2007).

2020

Jarret J. Krosoczka, who wrote, illustrated, and narrated the 2020 Odyssey-winning audiobook Hey, Kiddo, was a National Book Award for Young People's Literature finalist for the print edition.

== See also ==
- Category:Audiobooks
