= The Mark of the Golden Dragon =

2011 novel by L.A. Meyer

- First edition
- Author: L.A. Meyer
- Audio read by: Katherine Kellgren
- Language: English
- Genre: Young adult, Historical fiction
- Published: 2011
- Publisher: Clarion Books
- Pages: 378
- ISBN: 9780547517643
- Preceded by: The Wake of the Lorelei Lee
- Followed by: Viva Jacquelina!

The Mark of the Golden Dragon: Being an Account of the Further Adventures of Jacky Faber, Jewel of the East, Vexation of the West, and Pearl of the South China Sea is a historical fiction novel by L.A. Meyer published in 2011. It is the ninth book in the Bloody Jack Adventure series about a teenage girl named Jacky Faber, alias Bloody Jack, set in the early 19th century. It is preceded by Bloody Jack (2002), Curse of the Blue Tattoo (2004), Under the Jolly Roger (2005), In the Belly of the Bloodhound (2006), Mississippi Jack (2007), My Bonny Light Horseman (2008), Rapture of the Deep (2009), and The Wake of the Lorelei Lee (2010). It is followed by Viva Jacquelina! (2012), Boston Jacky (2013), and Wild Rover No More (2016).

== Plot overview ==
Having regained possession of her ship, Jacky plans to sail back to European waters along with members of HMS Dart and HMS Cerberus, but a typhoon separates her from the three ships when she is knocked overboard attempting to save Ravi, her little Indian companion. She washes ashore with Ravi, and navigates the land until she reunites with her friends on Nancy B. There she learns that Jaimy is quickly losing his sanity, believing that she had died, and resolves to clear his name and save his tortured mind.

== Plot summary ==
The book starts with a prologue. It depicts the funeral of Jacky Faber.

Chapter one starts with Jacky retelling the past events. Jacky is now the captain of Lorelei Lee, while Jaimy is the captain of Cerberus. Joseph Jared is in charge of HMS Dart. All three ships are passing through the Strait of Malacca. Jacky, Jaimy, and Jared along with other officers are joined on Lorelei Lee. HMS Dart was under orders to escort Cerberus to Australia and back. It is decided that Lorelei Lee will return to Boston, while HMS Dart and Cerberus will sail to London and will settle disputes there. It is also decided that along the way they will take as many French and Spanish ships as they can. Ravi is now serving the group wine. He asks why Jacky is singing a song about drinking Admiral Nelson's blood. Jacky tells the story of Admiral Lord Horatio Nelson, the hero of the Battle of Trafalgar. Nelson was shot down on the deck of HMS Victory. Not wanting to bury him at sea, the other officers decide to bring his body back to England. They put Nelson's body in a cask and fill it with rum, to preserve his body til they arrive in England. When they arrive in England, the rum was gone from the cask, it being drunk by the sailors. This is why a cup of Nelson's blood is saying a cup of rum. Jacky notices her servant Lee Chi looking outside and acting nervous. Lee Chi looks at Jacky and says typhoon.

Jacky orders everyone to his own vessel, and quickly exchanges a few kisses with Jaimy before leaving to command her ship. Wave after wave hits the vessel, and Lorelei Lee's mast is soon broken. Jacky orders it to be cut and cast off immediately, as leaving it on would only drag them down. Taking a saw for herself, she helps cut the mast. Ravi, thinking that he should be of help as well, runs from his cabin, only to trip over rope. Jacky catches him, and throws him back in direction of the cabin but she too becomes tangled in rope. The two fall overboard. The go underwater, and Jacky starts to yell. Ravi pops up next to her, and the mast shortly follows them. Blocked from the ships by the mast, the crew does not spot them, and they are thought of as dead.

The crew, now under command of Jaimy, Joseph Jared, and Higgins decide to sail to England, let off Jaimy, the Irish rogues, as well as the inhabitants of Dart. Jaimy and Jared have come to an agreement now, that he will give Jaimy gold, and let him slip by, as Jacky's false death was hard on him. Jacky had forged Captain's pardon, and they plan to give this to the court while Jaimy goes into temporary hiding. The crew then plans to come back to search for Jacky's body with Nancy B. Alsop, the small schooner being more effective of a search mission thank the cargo ships they now had. They hold a small farewell for Jacky, where Joseph Jared prays for her and moves on. Jaimy however is distraught and vows revenge. He blames their enemies Biffil and Flashby for Jacky's death as they are the ones who provided the false testimony that sent Jacky to Australia.

Meanwhile, Jacky is marooned on an island with Ravi. They eat clams and drink coconut milk and stay up in the trees for the night, to keep away from tigers. When morning arrives, Jacky sends Ravi to the village on the next hill to find out where they are and gather any news he hears. He comes back to inform Jacky that they are in the outskirts of an Indian village that speaks Urdu, which Ravi is fluent in. He also tells her that the villagers are in despair because their new leader is a tyrant. Jacky and Ravi spy on this man as Ravi finishes his story. The new head makes fishermen buy back their own catch, and he has taken one of the men's girl. Seeing the leader's small ship, Jacky forms a plan. The next day, the two go to meet the young man whose girl was taken. Jacky urges him to fight for his woman, telling him to use unconventional methods to kill, as none of the villagers have weaponry compared to the leader's.

They agree to do the deed during the evening return of the boats. Jacky and Ravi are offered shelter in the man's house. In the morning Jacky practices throwing a net, and the following evening, when the fishermen return, Jacky throws a net at the leader from behind a bush. A struggle follows, and the leader is killed with a multiple stabs from a trident. The young man thanks Jacky, and goes off to reclaim his girl, happy that the villagers have elected him leader. Jacky takes the dead man's boat and sails off with Ravi to find Rangoon, the large port nearby. On the way, she meets a few sailors from London, and asks them the news, directions, and the date. They share a small exchange and each sail opposite directions.

Meanwhile, every few chapters are letters Jaimy composes in his head to Jacky. It becomes obvious that he is slowly driven mad by Jacky's death.

Back at Rangoon, Ravi tells Jacky that her features are not charming by eastern standards. So she and Ravi decide to scam the locals into thinking she is retarded, and that Ravi is her caretaker, hoping to gain coin from pity. Jacky plays various musical instruments and Ravi spreads word that she is a horribly disfigured, mute, and retarded girl, who is amazingly a wonder with music. Jacky wears a veil to hide her face and the trick pays well.

However, the English sailors she previously met recognize her and start talking to her. Realizing her facade is lost, she unveils herself and starts talking in English. A large Indian man notices this and she and Ravi are kidnapped and taken to a Chinaman. Jacky desperately tries her idiot act again, but the Chinaman sees through her act and threatens Ravi. Jacky drops the act and formally introduces herself as Jacky M. Faber, president of Faber Shipping, and a lost young woman. The man is Chan-Le, but called "Chopstick Charlie" by the English men who visit. He is a very wealthy man who has a root in almost all businesses. Trade, lending, and transportation, just to name a few. He offers the two a safe place if they are to be his translators. He uses the two (who know five languages between them) to communicate with his prisoners, who each owe him something.

Jacky accepts this, as it is her only choice. She however is shown around by Charlie's daughter. The two visit a temple on day, when an earthquake strikes. Tidal waves follow, ruining the city, after which pirates attack to plunder the ruins. The two girls get kidnapped and are held for ransom, as they are finely dressed.

On the pirate's boat, she shows the pirates her Golden Dragon Tattoo. They laugh at this, and ignore the mark of safety form the most dreaded pirate Cheng Shih. Jacky jumps into the water and swims away, preferring to swim and take chances, than to be mistreated by pirates.

Jacky is once again marooned on another island. However, she quickly spots a ship flying American colors. She runs up to the ship, but it is going to fast. She decided to lure the men back to shore by putting kelp on her head and singing as if she is a mermaid. The men spot her and cry out in joy. The ship is Nancy B. Alsop on its mission to find Jacky's body.

Jacky is taken aboard and cleaned by Higgins. They share news and catch up on current events. Higgins stresses about how Jaimy might be mentally ill, and they decide to go search for him. However, Jacky has some unfinished business to catch up on. Joanie is also on the boat, as Jacky promised her a part in the next adventure she had.

Before bed, Joanie, playfully asks Jacky what went on between her and her captor during her days as a Chinese slave. Here it is finally revealed that Jacky had a relationship with Cheng Shih, the dreaded female pirate, though somehow indirectly. It had been hinted multiple times in The Wake of the Lorelei Lee that the two had a "special relationship", but never as clearly stated as now.

The crew sails back to the place where the pirates were seen, most of the crew dressed as women and their guns covered. The pirates think they have an easy catch, and start an attack, only to find that the boat is full of males, and a very angry ex-captive of theirs. Jacky takes the ship, frees her friend, and breaks part of the pirates' vessel, making it even more leaky. She then set the pirates off in direction of the island she was originally stranded on, knowing that there would be tigers there.

Back on the ship, the crew sails to Rangoon. Jacky, now having her fancy things with her now, and a good strong crew, feels she has the means to strike a deal with Chopstick Charlie after she returns his daughter.

== Characters ==
James "Jaimy" Emerson Fletcher: He is Jacky's true love and betrothed. Driven mad by her death, he becomes the famous Highway Man. The book heavily alludes to the poem "The Highwayman", including similar descriptions, characters, themes, and settings. He starts dating a girl named Bess (just as in "The Highwayman") and she helps him plan robberies and find information on Flashby and Biffil. The ending is closely related to the poem as well.

Captain Lord Richard Allen: He comforts Jacky and helps connect her to officials to free Jaimy from charges of murder. He offers her comfort while she mourns Jaimy's new state of mind. He is 26, and has become kinder in this book, compared to the rouge and disrespectful man in Mississippi Jack. It is hinted that Jacky might be really falling in love with him, and him the same with her. Her friends Tink and Davy also notice this, and they yell at her about staying faithful to Jaimy, while normally they would say nothing about her male friends. Jacky tries to ignore the unfaithful thoughts by reminding herself on the ten year age difference between her and Allen.

John Higgins: He is Jacky's best friend, confidant, and care taker. He is like a parent to Jacky. In this book he meets a gentleman friend, confirming previous hints on his sexuality. This also explains why he, a person who is a strong believer in being respectable, agrees to marry Jacky on the Lorelei Lee to help her fend off rape from other sailors, and agrees to divorce later on. This ties again with the fact that as they each plan a future, neither Jacky nor Higgins mention marriage for him, even though that is what every man his age is expected to do.

== Historical allusions ==
- "The Highwayman", a 1906 poem by Alfred Noyes: In The Mark of the Golden Dragon, Jacky's beloved Jaimy becomes the Highway Man. The book includes similar descriptions, characters, themes, and settings as in the poem, and contains a similar ending to the poem. Additionally, Jaimy begins dating a girl named Bess, as in "The Highwayman".

== Reception ==
In a starred review, Kirkus Reviews called Jacky "resilient and exuberant" and provided her "a stamp of approval". Booklist's Carolyn Phelan joked that Jacky has "more lives than a cat" as she travels "along coastal Asia, battling a tribal thug, a tiger, and a boatload of pirates" before returning to England. However, Kirkus Reviews noted that "aside from a clever scene involving some strategically placed seaweed, Jacky’s ingenious plans and bravery take a backseat to British political and social intrigue" in The Mark of the Golden Dragon. They also pointed out that, despite being "historically accurate, the focus on her acquired exoticism and Ravi’s race and pidgin speech may nevertheless prove jarring to modern readers".

Phelan also mentioned that the book "deliver[s] the high adventure, good humor, and bits of ballad that the Bloody Jack Adventure series is known for".

The audiobook narrated by Katherine Kellgren received an Earphone Award from AudioFile, who highlighted how "Kellgren plays every part with gusto". They further indicated that "Kellgren’s voice is integral to the part of Jacky, with her exasperating antics and lovable personality."
