= Katherine Kellgren =

American actor and voice actor (c. 1969-2018)

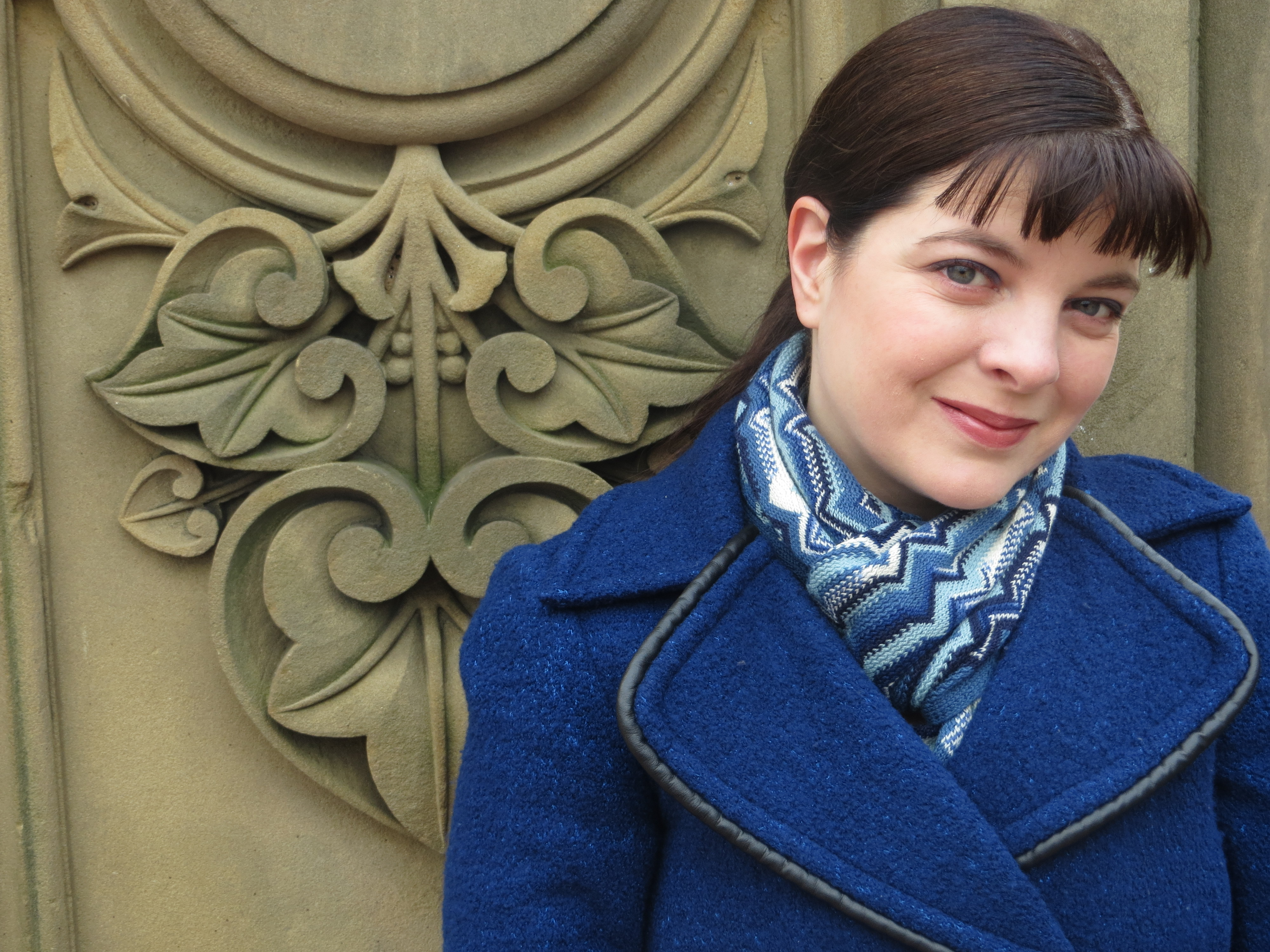
- Katherine Kellgren in Central Park
- Born: 1969; New York City, US
- Died: January 10, 2018 (aged 48–49); New York City, US
- Education: London Academy of Music and Dramatic Art
- Occupation: Actress
- Years active: 1996–2018
- Spouse: David Cote (m. 2011)

Katherine Ingrid Kellgren or Kjellgren (1969 – January 10, 2018) was an American actress, known for her narration of audiobooks.

== Personal life and education ==
Kellgren was born in 1969 in New York City, though she undertook a large proportion of her schooling in London. She studied acting at the London Academy of Music and Dramatic Art.

Kellgren married writer David Cote in 2011.

She died on January 10, 2018, at Memorial Sloan Kettering Cancer Center from complications of cancer.

== Career ==
Kellgren recorded radio plays early in her career, which prepared her for audiobook reader work.

Kellgren recorded over three hundred audiobooks. She was a multiple winner of the Audie Award and among her titles are five recipients of the American Library Association's Odyssey Award, as well as numerous AudioFile Earphones Awards, Publishers Weekly Listen Up Awards, and ForeWord Magazine's Audiobook of the Year. She was named a Voice of Choice by Booklist magazine, and is on AudioFile magazine's list of Golden Voices.

In addition to her audiobook work, Kellgren performed on the stage, notably Laura in The Glass Menagerie in 2003 with the Shakespeare Theater of New Jersey.

== Awards and honors ==
As a narrator, Kellgren was the 2011 Booklist Voice of Choice. AudioFile named her a Golden Voice Narrator. She won 11 Audie Awards and 43 Earphone Awards and was a finalist for numerous other awards.

=== Awards ===
Awards for Kellgren's narrations, alphabetical order by author's last name
Year	Author	Title	Publisher	Award	Result	Ref.
2007	Sarah Bradford	Diana	Penguin Audio	Audie Award for Biography/Memoir	Finalist	
2008	L.A. Meyer	Bloody Jack	Listen & Live Audio	Audie Award for Children's Title for Ages 12+	Winner	
2008	L.A. Meyer	Bloody Jack	Listen & Live Audio	Odyssey Award	Honor	
2009	L.A. Meyer	Curse of the Blue Tattoo	Listen & Live Audio	Audie Award for Distinguished Achievement in Production	Winner	
2009	L.A. Meyer	Curse of the Blue Tattoo	Listen & Live Audio	Audie Award for Solo Narration - Female	Winner	
2009	L.A. Meyer	Curse of the Blue Tattoo	Listen & Live Audio	Audie Award for Teens	Winner	
2009	L.A. Meyer	Curse of the Blue Tattoo	Listen & Live Audio	Odyssey Award	Honor	
2010	Karen Cushman	Grayling's Song	Recorded Books	Earphone Award for Best Voice in Children & Family Listening	Winner	
2010	L.A. Meyer	In the Belly of the Bloodhound	Listen & Live Audio	Audie Award for Solo Narration - Female	Finalist	
2010	L.A. Meyer	In the Belly of the Bloodhound	Listen & Live Audio	Audie Award for Teens	Finalist	
2010	L.A. Meyer	In the Belly of the Bloodhound	Listen & Live Audio	Odyssey Award	Honor	
2010	L.A. Meyer	Mississippi Jack	Listen & Live Audio	Audie Award for Solo Narration - Female	Finalist	
2010	L.A. Meyer	Mississippi Jack	Listen & Live Audio	Audie Award for Teens	Finalist	
2011	Paolo Bacigalupi and Tobias S. Buckell	The Alchemist and the Executioness	Audible, Inc.	Audie Award for Original Work	Finalist	
2011	Rhys Bowen	Her Royal Spyness	Audible, Inc.	Audie Award for Mystery	Finalist	
2011	Paul Crilley	The Invisible Order	Audible, Inc.	Audie Award for Solo Narration - Female	Finalist	
2011	Karen Cushman	Alchemy and Meggy Swan	Random House Audio	Audie Award for Children' Titles for Ages 8-12	Finalist	
2011	Karen Cushman	Alchemy and Meggy Swan	Random House Audio	Odyssey Award	Honor	
2011	Neil Gaiman and the Twitterverse	Hearts, Keys and Puppetry	AudioGO	Audie Award for Original Work	Finalist	
2011	Steve Hockensmith and Jane Austen	Pride and Prejudice and Zombies	Audible, Inc./Brilliance Audio	Audie Award for Fiction	Finalist	
2011	L.A. Meyer	Rapture of the Deep	Listen & Live Audio	Amazing Audiobooks for Young Adults	Top 10	
2011	L.A. Meyer	Rapture of the Deep	Listen & Live Audio	Audie Award for Solo Narration - Female	Finalist	
2011	Rick Riordan	The Red Pyramid	Audible, Inc.	Audie Award for Audiobook of the Year	Finalist	
2011	Neil Gaiman	Stories: All-New Tales	Harper Audio	Audie Award for Short Stories / Collections	Winner	
2012	Ilsa J. Bick	Ashes	Audible, Inc./Brilliance Audio	Audie Award for Solo Narration - Female	Finalist	
2012	Rhys Bowen	Naughty in Nice	Audible, Inc.	Audie Award for Mystery	Finalist	
2012	Nicola Cornick	Notorious	Audible, Inc.	Audie Award for Romance	Finalist	
2012	Steve Hockensmith	Pride and Prejudice and Zombies	Audible, Inc./Brilliance Audio	Audie Award for Fantasy	Finalist	
2012	L.A. Meyer	The Wake of the Lorelei Lee	Listen & Live Audio	Amazing Audiobooks for Young Adults	Top 10	
2012	L.A. Meyer	The Wake of the Lorelei Lee	Listen & Live Audio	Audie Award for Solo Narration - Female	Finalist	
2012	L.A. Meyer	The Wake of the Lorelei Lee	Listen & Live Audio	Audie Award for Teen	Finalist	
2012	Eudora Welty	The Collected Stories of Eudora Welty	Audible, Inc.	Audie Award for Short Stories or Collections	Finalist	
2012	Maryrose Wood	The Hidden Gallery	HarperAudio/Books on Tape	Audie Award for Children' Titles for Ages 8-12	Finalist	
2013	Carmen Agra Deedy and Randall Wright	The Cheshire Cat	Listening Library	Audie Award for Children's Titles Ages 8-12	Finalist	
2013	Elizabeth Fama	Monstrous Beauty		Odyssey Award	Honor	
2013	Lene KaaberbølAgnete Friis	The Boy in the Suitcase	AudioGO	Audie Award for Solo Narration - Female	Winner	
2013	Lene KaaberbølAgnete Friis	The Boy in the Suitcase	AudioGO	Audie Award for Thriller/Suspense	Finalist	
2013	Alethea Kontis	Enchanted	Brilliance Audio	Audie Award for Teens	Finalist	
2013	Ellen Kushner	Swordspoint	Audible, Inc.	Audie Award for Audio Drama	Winner	
2013	Bram Stoker	Dracula	Audible, Inc.	Audie Award for Classics	Finalist	
2013	Bram Stoker	Dracula	Audible, Inc.	Audie Award for Distinguished Achievement in Production	Winner	
2013	Bram Stoker	Dracula	Audible, Inc.	Audie Award for Multi-Voiced Performance	Winner	
2013	Maryrose Wood	The Incorrigible Children of Ashton Place, Book III	HarperAudio	Audie Award for Solo Narration - Female	Finalist	
2014	Rhys Bowen	Heirs and Graces	Audible, Inc.	Audie Award for Mystery	Finalist	
2014	Rhys Bowen	The Twelve Clues of Christmas:	Audible, Inc.	Audie Award for Solo Narration - Female	Winner	
2014	Caroline Carlson	Magic Marks the Spot	HarperAudio	Audie Award for Children's Titles Ages 8-12	Finalist	
2014	Michael B. Kaplan	Betty Bunny Loves Chocolate Cake	Live Oak Media	Audie Award for Children's Titles for Ages Up to 8	Finalist	
2014	L.A. Meyer	Viva Jacquelina!	Listen & Live Audio	Amazing Audiobooks for Young Adults	Top 10	
2014	L.A. Meyer	Viva Jacquelina!	Listen & Live Audio	Audie Award for Teen	Winner	
2015	Erika Johansen	The Queen of the Tearling	HarperAudio	Audie Award for Fantasy	Finalist	
2015	Ellen Kushner and Delia Sherman	The Swords of Riverside	SueMedia Productions for Neil Gaiman/ACX	Audie Award for Audio Drama	Finalist	
2015	L.A. Meyer	Boston Jacky	Listen & Live Audio, Inc.	Audie Award for Best Female Narrator	Finalist	
2015	L.A. Meyer	Boston Jacky	Listen & Live Audio, Inc.	Audie Award for Teens	Finalist	
2015	Beatrix Potter	Timeless Tales of Beatrix Potter	Tantor Media	Audie Award for Children's Titles for Ages Up to 8	Finalist	
2016	Rhys Bowen	Malice at the Palace	Audible Studios	Audie Award for Mystery	Finalist	
2016	L.A. Meyer	Wild Rover No More	Listen & Live Audio	Audie Award for Best Female Narrator	Finalist	
2016	Maryrose Wood	The Incorrigible Children of Ashton Place	HarperAudio	Audie Award for Middle Grade Title	Finalist	
2017	Cynthia Hand, Brodi Ashton, and Jodi Meadows	My Lady Jane	HarperAudio	Audie Award for Young Adult Title	Finalist	
2018	Rhys Bowen	On Her Majesty's Frightfully Secret Service	Audible Studios	Audie Award for Mystery	Finalist	

=== "Best of" lists ===
Year	Title	List	Ref.
2006	Prom by Laurie Halse Anderson	Amazing Audiobooks for Young Adults	
2008	Bloody Jack by L. A. Meyer	Notable Children's Recordings	
2010	In the Belly of the Bloodhound by L. A. Meyer	Amazing Audiobooks for Young Adults	
2011	Alchemy and Meggy Swann by Karen Cushman	Notable Children's Recordings	
2011	Alchemy and Meggy Swann by Karen Cushman	Amazing Audiobooks for Young Adults	
2011	The Curious Garden	Notable Children's Recordings	
2011	Enola Holmes: The Case of the Peculiar Pink Fan by Nancy Springer	Amazing Audiobooks for Young Adults	
2011	The Incorrigible Children of Ashton Place: The Hidden Gallery (2011) by Maryrose Wood	Booklist Editors' Choice: Media	
2011	What to Do about Alice?	Notable Children's Recordings	
2012	Fletcher and the Springtime Blossoms	Notable Children's Recordings	
2012	Sophomore Switch by Abby McDonald	Amazing Audiobooks for Young Adults	
2013	Enchanted by Alethea Kontis	Amazing Audiobooks for Young Adults	
2013	Monstrous Beauty by Elizabeth Fama	Amazing Audiobooks for Young Adults	
2015	The Knockoff by Lucy Sykes and Jo Piazza	Booklist Editors' Choice: Audio for Adults	
2015	The Queen of the Tearling by Erika Johansen	Listen List	
2015	Wild Rover No More by L. A. Meyer	Booklist Editors' Choice: Audio for Youth	
2016	The Knockoff by Lucy Sykes and Jo Piazza	Listen List: Outstanding Audio Narration	
2016	Grayling's Song by Karen Cushman	Booklist Editors' Choice: Audio for Youth	
2017	The Cat Who Came In off the Roof by Annie M. G. Schmidt	Booklist Editors' Choice: Audio for Youth	
2017	The Cat Who Came In off the Roof by Annie M. G. Schmidt	Notable Children's Recordings	
2017	Grayling's Song by Karen Cushman	Notable Children's Recordings	
