= Curse of the Blue Tattoo =

2004 historical novel by L.A. Meyer

- Author: Louis A. Meyer
- Audio read by: Katherine Kellgren
- Cover artist: Cliff Nielsen
- Language: English
- Genre: Young adult, historical fiction
- Publisher: Harcourt Children's Books
- Publication date: June 1, 2004
- Publication place: United States
- Media type: Print (hardback & paperback); Audiobook
- Pages: 496 pp
- ISBN: 978-0-15-205115-0
- OCLC: 53971710
- LC Class: PZ7.M57172 Bl 2004
- Preceded by: Bloody Jack
- Followed by: Under the Jolly Roger

Curse of the Blue Tattoo is a 2004 historical novel by L.A. Meyer, the second book in the Bloody Jack series. It continues the story of orphaned London girl, Jacky Faber, in the early 19th century. The novel is preceded by Bloody Jack (2002) and followed by Under the Jolly Roger (2005), In the Belly of the Bloodhound (2006), Mississippi Jack (2007), My Bonny Light Horseman (2008), Rapture of the Deep (2009), The Wake of the Lorelei Lee (2010), The Mark of the Golden Dragon (2011), Viva Jacquelina! (2012), Boston Jacky (2013), and Wild Rover No More (2016).

Curse of the Blue Tattoo audiobook narrated by Katherine Kellgren received various accolades, including Audie Awards and being named an Odyssey Award honor book.

== Background ==
At the end of Bloody Jack, Jacky Faber is exposed as a girl and sent to the Lawson Peabody School for Young Girls in Boston, in the hopes that they can find her a husband.

The book's title refers to the anchor tattoo Jacky received while serving as a ship's boy. Frequently mistaken for a pitchfork, it becomes a great source of trouble for her.

== Plot summary ==
After saying goodbye to her shipmates, Jacky is sent to Lawson Peabody's and turned over to the custody of Miranda Pimm, the elderly headmistress. From the start, it is clear that she has a very low opinion of Jacky, going so far as to have her earring cut off and her mail seized to keep her from sending letters to her beloved, Midshipman Jaimy Fletcher.

Shunned by most of her fellow students, Jacky strikes up a friendship with Amy Trevelyne, the daughter of a wealthy Massachusetts farmer. Clarissa Worthington Howe, an arrogant Virginia heiress who enjoys abusing the school staff, takes an instant dislike to Jacky and insults her mother, resulting in a fight between the girls. As punishment, the two are beaten and forced to give up dinner and supper.

Eager to please Pimm, Jacky throws herself into her classes, which include horse riding, art, music, embroidery, French, and etiquette. Jacky is subsequently noticed by Reverend Richard Mather, the school priest, who views her as a disgrace. While visiting the graveyard near his church, Jacky stumbles upon an unmarked grave, which she later learns belonged to Mather's former servant, Janey Porter.

While wandering the streets of Boston unsupervised, Jacky is arrested for public indecency and put on trial. When the court learns that she attends Lawson Peabody's, however, they decide to embarrass the school by having Jacky paraded through the streets in chains. Humiliated, Pimm assigns Jacky to work as a lowly servant, while Mather petitions the court to appoint him as her legal guardian.

Welcomed by her fellow workers, Jacky decides to form a Sisterhood of Lawson Peabody Girls, consisting of several serving girls and Amy. While meeting with her lawyer, Ezra Pickering, she also learns that Janey Porter's death was declared a suicide, but was briefly suspected to be murder. Jacky spies on Mather and discovers that he is a drunkard and religious zealot obsessed with ridding the world of "witches" and "demons".

Convinced that Mather is responsible for killing Janey, Jacky poses as her and starts "haunting" him, further increasing his paranoia.

Having grown increasingly attracted to Amy's brother Randall, Jacky attends a party at her family's mansion, during which she gets drunk and makes a fool of herself. After an argument with Amy, Jacky runs away and flees to New York City. On the way there, two men hired by Mather abduct her and bring her back to the school.

Convinced that Jacky is Janey reincarnated, Mather plans to stake her with her own shiv. A fire breaks out in the church, during which Jacky's friends rescue her and trap Mather, causing him to die when the church collapses in on itself. The fire then spreads to the school, and though Jacky manages to save Pimm and her students, the entire building is lost. Fearing arrest, Jacky flees Boston and joins the crew of a whaling ship as a servant.

== Characters ==
- Mary 'Jacky' Faber: The protagonist of the story. She came from a fairly well-off family who died in an epidemic. Homeless and penniless, she joined Rooster Charlie's gang, and lived under a bridge for several years, begging and thieving for mere survival. After Charlie is killed, she enlisted with the crew of the H.M.S. Dolphin, under the ruse of being a boy. When she was revealed to be a girl, she was sent to a boarding school in Boston.
- James 'Jaimy' Emerson Fletcher: A former ship's boy, now a midshipman and Jacky's true love. They write several letters to one another, which he uses to declare his undying love for her.
- Mistress Miranda Pimm: The stern headmistress of the Lawson Peabody School for Young Girls. She takes a disliking for Jacky but deals with her ways nonetheless. She develops a slow liking as the book progresses. Jacky saves the Mistress from the fire that engulfs the school.
- Reverend Richard Mather: The Puritan minister that preaches for the school. A silent man; very demented. A year before Jacky came to the school, he murdered a young girl by the name of Janey Porter because he believed her to be a witch. He thinks the same of Jacky, and attempts to kill her.
- Ephraim Fyffe: A young man who was engaged to marry Janey Porter before she died. He helps Jacky investigate the Reverend and the murder.
- Amy Trevelyne: A plump, likeable Puritan girl that takes up with Jacky instantly.
- Clarissa Worthington Howe: A rude, snobbish girl from a rich Southern family. A stereotypical Southern belle, she and Jacky hate each other at first sight.
- Davy: A friend of Jacky's from the 'Dolphin' days.
- Randall Trevelyne: Amy's womanizing older brother. Jacky develops a relationship with Randall.
- Mam'selle Claudelle de Bourbon: A Cajun prostitute from New Orleans. She befriends Jacky; calling her "Precious." .
- Gulliver "Gully" McFarland: A thieving drunkard who plays a fine violin called the Lady Lenore. In Jacky's freetime, they perform in the taverns of Boston.
- Ezra Pickering: Jacky's trustworthy and charismatic lawyer. Jacky, Amy and Ephraim aid him in the investigation of the reverend.
- Judge Thwackham: A snobbish and brutal judge who tries Jacky for lewd behavior.
- Constable John Wiggins: Lisping lawman who runs the Boston city jail and dislikes Jacky.
- Dobbs: Mistress Pimm's crabby handyman.

== Reception ==
Curse of the Blue Tattoo received starred reviews from Booklist and Kirkus Reviews.

Tricia Melgaard, writing for School Library Journal, called the novel "fabulous", while Kirkus Reviews referred to it as a "perfectly delicious" and a "rousing adventure".

Melgaard also indicated that the main character, Jacky, is "loyal, clever, sassy, impudent, and just a little bit naughty," which makes her "a protagonist to admire". Kirkus Reviews however, noted that the novel is "short on character development".

Booklist and School Library Journal also provided the audiobook a starred review. Melgaard wrote, "Katherine Kellgren delivers a stunning performance with a myriad of amazing voices. Her cockney Jacky is just right and makes the story more accessible to listeners who may struggle with the Brit-speak".

== Accolades ==
Curse of the Blue Tattoo is a Junior Library Guild book.

The Young Adult Library Services Association (YALSA) included Curse of the Blue Tattoo on their 2005 list of the Best Fiction for Young Adults, as well as their 2013 list of Popular Paperbacks for Young Adults. In 2009, YALSA included the audiobook on their list of Amazing Audiobooks for Young Adults; the Association for Library Service to Children included it on their list of Notable Children's Recordings.

Awards for Curse of the Blue Tattoo
Year	Award	Result	Ref.
2009	Audie Award for Distinguished Achievement in Production	Winner	
2009	Audie Award for Solo Narration - Female	Winner	
2009	Audie Award for Teens	Winner	
2009	Odyssey Award	Honor	

== Release details ==
2004, USA, Harcourt Trade Publishers ISBN 978-0-15-205115-0, Trade Paperback
