= My Bonny Light Horseman =

2008 novel by L.A. Meyer

- First edition
- Author: Louis A. Meyer
- Cover artist: Cliff Nielsen
- Series: Bloody Jack
- Genre: Young Adult's, Historical novel
- Publisher: Harcourt Children's Books
- Publication date: September 1, 2008
- Publication place: United States
- Media type: Print (Hardback)Audiobook: Read by Katherine Kellgren
- Pages: 448 pp
- ISBN: 0-15-206187-8
- OCLC: 191696704
- Preceded by: Mississippi Jack
- Followed by: Rapture of the Deep

My Bonny Light Horseman: Being an Account of the Further Adventures of Jacky Faber, in Love and War is a historical novel written by L.A. Meyer, published in 2008. It is the sixth book in the Bloody Jack Adventure series about a teenage girl named Jacky Faber, alias Bloody Jack, set in the early 19th century.

My Bonny Light Horseman is preceded by Bloody Jack (2002), Curse of the Blue Tattoo (2004), Under the Jolly Roger (2005), In the Belly of the Bloodhound (2006), and Mississippi Jack (2007). It is followed by Rapture of the Deep (2009), The Wake of the Lorelei Lee (2010), The Mark of the Golden Dragon (2011), Viva Jacquelina! (2012), Boston Jacky (2013), and Wild Rover No More (2016).

== Plot ==
The story starts with Jacky back on sea after visiting her dear friend, Amy Trevelyne, following her adventures throughout the U.S. frontier. She sails her ship Nancy B. Alsop while waiting for Jaimy to come back from the Orient to marry her.

Soon though, a British warship, HMS Dauntless has come to imprison Jacky and her crew but after an intense confrontation with Bliffil (an old nemesis of Jacky's) and British soldiers, Jacky surrenders, asking that the British spare her crew. Much to their dismay, Captain Hudson and the officers accept her request and sail away. Despite Jacky's skeptical attitude once aboard, she is realized as nothing but a young, innocent girl that was wrongly labeled a rogue by King George, despite Bliffil's accusation of her being known as "Tuppence a lay" on HMS Dolphin and a threat to every man board. She soon meets up with two acquaintances, David "Davy" Jones and Joseph Jared; she also befriends the Dr. Sebastian and Captain Hudson of the Dauntless.

Bliffil nags at Jacky, bullying her until the crew can not take it anymore. The crew, especially Jared, threaten him on several occasions should Bliffil ever again threaten her. Jacky gains her freedom from the ship for being a docile captive. She takes up with Dr. Sebastian and paints him a much-acclaimed portrait and portfolio. He shows her a rare Mexican dung beetle and she meets his other assistant. Once Captain Hudson hears and sees of her talent, he has her paint him a portrait of his own. Later, Hudson and Sebastian meet in private discussing how they feel about Jacky being thought of as a "rogue" and a "pirate" by the King himself.

They sail to British waters but after the senior crew is struck with food poisoning, Jacky persuades Hudson to allow her to take command. While Hudson and the rest of Dauntless' crew that ate the fish are ill, the Dauntless is attacked by the French and Dutch. Jacky is forced to strike the colors, but not before she's had the ill officers brought to their stations on stretchers, to preserve their honor.

The crew is taken to the French prison of Cherbourg. Jared takes to sleeping in the same bed as Jacky, to still her post-traumatic stress disorder. Hudson is soon paroled, and Jared assaults Bliffil as he continues to insult Jacky (Now claiming to be male Midshipman "Jack Kemp", a play on "Jack Hemp"). The Dauntless prisoners are joined by the captured crew of HMS Mercury, and Jaimy has been severely wounded. Bliffil had passed a note to a guard, and Jacky is exposed as the pirate La Belle Jeune Fille sans Merci, "The Beautiful Young Girl Without Mercy". A lawyer by the name of Jardineaux comes for Jacky to take her to the guillotine. Jared again attempts to kill Bliffil, but is beaten down by the guards. She is sent to be executed, but en route to the site of the execution, she is switched with another girl.

She is sent back to London to meet with First Lord Thomas Grenville and Mr. Peel of Naval Intelligence, with Bliffil attending. Upon her arrival, she attacks the three and attempts to garrote Bliffil. Grenville and Peel smooth things over and she releases Bliffil from near-death. Grenville leaves Mr. Peel to give Jacky the mission and he informs her of the cover-up.

British Intelligence wants the French to believe that Jacky Faber is dead in order to send her back across the channel as a spy. Jacky is to train as a ballerina, performing in a Parisian nightclub frequented by French officers, who often vie to "escort" the young girls home. She is told that if she refuses the mission, British Intelligence intends to "hurt" the ones she loves. Jacky cannot bear to lose her orphanage, but bargains to have Dr. Sebastian, Jaimy, Jared and Davey released.

Jacky spends the next two weeks training in ballet, shopping for new clothing and gear, and visiting both St Paul's Cathedral and the Fletcher household, family of her betrothed. Jaimy's father and brother both receive her much more warmly than his mother had (in Under the Jolly Roger), and grimly bear the news of Jaimy's injuries. The last night Jacky is in England is the first night Jaimy is at home, and the two share a tender moment before she has to leave for her mission.

The British escort Jacky to France where they place her in Paris. She establishes herself in an apartment, and learns that Jardineaux is her "Control". She acquaints herself with her Royalist Handler by the name of Jean-Paul de Valdon and they establish a fast friendship, guiding her through the Notre Dame de Paris, The Louvre (notably, a painting of one of his relations, Charlotte Corday the assassin of Revolutionary Jean-Paul Marat).

Jacky joins the troupe "Le Petit Gamine" under the name Jacqueline Bouvier, and she is approached by her first target, one Field Marshal de Groote, nicknamed "The Goat" by the other girls. Jacky offers to meet him the following Tuesday evening, and then arranges for his wife to catch him "in the act". He arrives on the night of the sting dressed in a wolf mask, earlier having referred to her as "Little Red Riding Hood". After plying de Groote with cognac laced with Pparegoric and prying Napoleon's troop movements out of him, his wife arrives brandishing pistols. The ensuing altercation injures de Groote, disabling him and attracting the attention of the police.

Jardineaux proposes to next have Jacky serve as a camp follower, trailing Napoleon's men. Jacky, offended, decides to dress as a man, this time joining Napoleon's messengers, granting her ready access to military documents. She assumes the name Jacques Bouvier a West Point cadet.

Upon arrival, she is given the duties of training a unit of inexperienced, untrained soldiers. She runs afoul of a Major Levesque but also makes friends amongst the officers and soldiers under her command. She and her soldiers, nicknamed the "Clod Hoppers" due to their rough, country origins meet Napoleon, presenting him with a captured Prussian flag. Soon afterwards, Jacky is reunited with Jean Paul and Randall Trevelyne. They see action in the Battle of Jena and Napoleon releases her from the Army, awarding her a Legion of Honour. After war, she gives Mathilde to her assistant-in-war Denis Dufour.

Meanwhile, Jaimy is fully awaken from his concussion and tries to find what happened to Jacky after the stint at the French prison. They find out she was working in Paris so they set sail aboard Nancy B. Alsop.

Jacky's days of war are over and she reports back to Paris. She meets Jardineaux there, where things turn fierce. Jardineaux tells Jacky his disappointment in her for not killing Napoleon and brands her a traitor. He holds her at gunpoint and has her ride with him to the docks where he would kill her. Once there, Jean Paul appears to reveal more of what Jardineaux had plotted for Napoleon and just as soon as Jardineaux is about to kill Jacky. Jean Paul impales him with Jacky's shiv (which he had taken prior to her being taken to the dock), saving Jacky. Before this, however, Jardineaux showed Jacky that her ship, Nancy B. Alsop was coming into dock. So she leaves Jean Paul at the dock to be picked up by Jaimy, Higgins and the rest of the crew, saying, "I have come home."

== Characters ==
- Jacky Faber: the main protagonist
- James "Jaimy" Fletcher: Jacky's true love and fiance. He was set asail on a ship bound to the Orient when he falls into a concussion after battle and is delivered to the nearest prison in France, it is the one Jacky was staying in before her "execution." After the execution stunt the British had played on the French, Jacky talked to Mr. Peel about releasing Jaimy and the rest from the same prison; having Jaimy recover under the eyes of his family.
- Captain Hannibal Hudson & Dr. Stephen Sebastian: Notable as a reference to "Lucky" Jack Aubrey and Dr. Maturin of Patrick O'Brian's Aubrey-Maturin series
- Jean-Paul de Valdon: a French operative that opposes Napoleon and under Jardineaux's thumb. He follows Jacky through her mission as a nightclub performer/prostitute and her days as a cadet under Napoleon.
- Jardineaux: The main antagonist of the book; he is introduced as a rude lawyer sent to deliver Jacky to the guillotine and placed her head agent during the missions for British Intelligence. Despite strict orders to have Jacky safe from harm and keep under a good eye. Jardineaux tries to kill Jacky for not assassinating Napoleon.
- Mr. Peel: Head of British Intelligence, he is the one that assigns Jacky to the mission.
- Lord Grenville: Another leader for British Intelligence, more reserved and prissy than Mr. Peel.
- Bliffil: A horrible man that spends a good amount of the book trying to reveal Jacky's true colors from stories of the past and her past confrontations with him. Finally, Jacky nearly kills him with an injury to his jugular vein.
- Madame Petrova: A dance instructor that prepares Jacky for Paris.
- Madame Gris and the dancing troupe: The dancing troupe that performs and sells their bodies for information about Napoleon and the Grand Army.
- Denis Dufour and the Army: Jacky's partners and brothers-in-arms.
- Napoleon Bonaparte: Emperor of France.
- Higgins: Jacky's 'butler' and assistant, he is finally reunited with Jacky at the end of the novel.
- James/Jim Tanner: First mate to Jacky and Higgins both.
- Daniel Prescott: the ship's boy who was picked up after Jacky's battle with the Cave-in-Rock bandits in the previous novel.
- John Thomas and Smasher McGee: sailors on the Nancy B.

== Reception ==
Kirkus Reviews made note of the novel's "breakneck pace" as Jacky "either saves the day or slithers out of trouble thanks to her wits and larger-than-life heroics". Booklist's Carolyn Phelan also mentioned Jacky's wits, noting that "fans will gladly forgive the plot's overuse of coincidence for the pleasure of watching their heroine use her wits to overcome obstacles and win over nearly everyone she meets".

Kirkus also compared Meyer's narration to that of Patrick O’Brian, given the novel's "energy", "historicity", and "variety of sly references". Further, they highlighted the novel's "amusing nomenclature, historical and cultural in-jokes and colorful locales", which they state "are strewn with abandon throughout the long and tireless narrative".

== Accolades ==
My Bonny Light Horseman is a Junior Library Guild book.

In 2010, the American Library Association included the audiobook on their list of Amazing Audiobooks for Young Adults.
