= The Wake of the Lorelei Lee =

Book by L.A. Meyer

- First edition
- Author: L.A. Meyer
- Audio read by: Katherine Kellgren
- Language: English
- Genre: Young adult, Historical novel
- Published: 2010
- Publisher: Houghton Mifflin Harcourt
- Publication place: United States
- Pages: 552 pages
- ISBN: 9780547327686
- Preceded by: Rapture of the Deep
- Followed by: The Mark of the Golden Dragon

The Wake of the Lorelei Lee: Being an Account of the Further Adventures of Jacky Faber, on Her Way to Botany Bay is a historical novel by L.A. Meyer published in 2010. It is the eighth book in the Bloody Jack Adventure series about a teenage girl named Jacky Faber, alias Bloody Jack, set in the early 19th century.

The Wake of the Lorelei Lee is preceded by Bloody Jack (2002), Curse of the Blue Tattoo (2004), Under the Jolly Roger (2005), In the Belly of the Bloodhound (2006), Mississippi Jack (2007), My Bonny Light Horseman (2008), and Rapture of the Deep (2009). It is followed by The Mark of the Golden Dragon (2011), Viva Jacquelina! (2012), Boston Jacky (2013), and Wild Rover No More (2016).

== Plot introduction ==
Jacky has purchased a ship, the Lorelei Lee, with the Spanish gold she recovered from the Caribbean sea. When she arrives in London she is arrested for piracy. Instead of being executed, Jacky is sentenced to life in the penal colony of Australia. To make matters worse, the Lorelei Lee is taken from Jacky and is used to transport Jacky and 200 female convicts to the penal colony.

== Plot summary ==
In the previous book, Rapture of the Deep, Jacky is forced by British Naval Intelligence to recover Spanish gold from the bottom of the Caribbean Sea. She used a diving bell to recover the gold, which she still has in her possession. Jacky kept some of this gold and bought a ship, the Lorelei Lee. The Lorelei Lee has four large cabins, 24 regular-sized cabins, and three levels of open hammock spaces. Jacky plans to carry passengers across the Atlantic Ocean.

Before the voyage to London, Jacky and her dear friend, Amy, travel to Amy's family farm, Dovecote. While on the farm Jacky sees her friend and Amy's brother Randall. She finds out that Randall has joined the United States Marine Corps and is going to sea. They attend a religious revival at the farm, where Jacky sees her old associates Mr. Fennel and Mr. Bean, who are stage performers. They are putting on the show with a girl that Jacky discovers to be Polly Von, a former member of Jacky's gang in Cheapside. Jaimy sends a letter to Jacky, saying the British Admiralty will soon absolve Jacky of all alleged crimes. Jacky, excited to be reunited with Jaimy, sets sail to England. After Jacky has set sail, Jaimy sends another letter saying the leadership at the British Admiralty has changed. Both Jacky & Jaimy are wanted. Jaimy expects to be arrested immediately. When Jacky sails into London she is taken to Newgate Prison by her old enemies, Bliffil and Flashby. Jacky goes before the court and is sentenced to life at the penal colony in Australia. To make matters worse, the Lorelei Lee is confiscated and used to transport Jacky and 250 other female convicts, to become "breeders" to populate Australia. Jacky had decked out the Lorelei Lee to carry passengers across the Atlantic Ocean, so it was equipped for the voyage to Australia. The Lorelei has three levels of open hammock spaces and Jacky, knowing which level is best, claims the top level of hammocks for her and her new crew of girls. Four groups form on the ship, the Lizzies, the Judies, and the Tartans, named after their leaders, and Jacky's group, called the Newgaters Crew, which includes Mary Wade and Esther Abrahams. Captain Laughton tells the girls that after they reach Gibraltar the different hammock levels will be auctioned off. The other three crews, being prostitutes, plan on making their money that way. The Newgaters Crew, consisting of twelve girls, including Jacky, plan on doing the ship's laundry in an attempt to make money. Captain Laughton also tells the girls and the crew that they are welcome to mingle and get together. The Captain gets more money if, when they arrive in Australia, any girls are pregnant or have had a child, so they are welcome to it, and they will get a shilling in return.

Meanwhile, the book switches to letters from Jaimy to Jacky. The letters do not reach Jacky, but it tells the reader what has happened to Jaimy. Jaimy has been convicted of defrauding the king and sentenced to seven years in the penal colony of Australia. Jaimy has been told by the prison guards that Jacky has not been hanged and has been sent to Australia. The father and brother confirm this and Jaimy is put on the ship to Australia. On the ship, Jaimy finds Ian McConnaughey and Arthur McBride, from Jacky's former ship the Emerald, as well as other members of the former crew.

The Lorelei Lee arrives in Gibraltar. They ship is to be there for three days and the other crews go on with their profession to make money to be able to buy the good levels of hammocks. The next day, Jacky goes onto the dock in her swim suit. She invites people to throw coins into the water, which she will retrieve. She works the docks all day, though not making nearly as much as the other crews. Later Jacky sees that the ship is taking on a few more girls and that one of them is Mairead. Mairead has been sentenced to life in Australia as well. Mairead tells her of her arrest and the fact that she is pregnant. As Jacky continues to dive for coins she sees some old shipmates from the Wolverine. She also sees Gully MacFarland, her old partner in Boston, who Jacky put upon a British Navy ship after he got drunk and hit her. He tells her he is now sober and she is the reason, which he is thankful for. After the Lorelei Lee leaves Gibraltar the Captain auctions off the hammock spaces to the four different crews. The three other crews outbid Jacky and her crew for the best hammock spaces. However, this was Jacky's plan all along. Jacky and her crew make the laundry room their home. Jacky, being the former owner of the Lorelei Lee, knows where the extra mattresses are, and with some help from the carpenter, they make bunk beds for the crew.

As the ship sails on, the Captain begins to have dinner parties in his cabin, with the officers attending. Jacky is there too, being the entertainment. During these parties Major George Johnston, an officer, has been attending with a girl from Jacky's crew, Esther Abrahams. At one of the dinners they announce their engagement and the next day they are married. After the wedding the Captain pushes Higgins to take a girl for himself. Higgins takes this opportunity to protect himself as well as Jacky by taking her as his wife. The first mate Mr. Ruger has been coming on to Jacky and by marrying Higgins, she can somewhat ward off his advances. Jacky on the other hand, uses their marriage to tease Higgins to no end by asking him to carry her across the threshold of their cabin and calling him "Dear Husband John" and such. That night, as Jacky and Higgins jump on the bed and make noises to make their marriage look, if not sound, real, she jokingly slides her hands down his waist and asks him if he would want her to, being legally married and all. They both have a laugh over this and fall asleep.

The ship then makes it to India. Jacky and Mairead go out to explore India with Higgins and Captain Laughton. Jacky and Mairead get separated from the others. A small boy named Ravi offers to be their tour guide. Ravi is part of the untouchable caste and is an orphan after his mother died. Ravi shows them around, exchanges their money. The girls are sticking out so Ravi uses their money to buy them Indian clothing. He shows them the different Indian gods, including the Goddess Kali and the God Ganesh. After the girls eat some Indian food they are able to ride an elephant. Riding the elephant, Jacky and Mairead go on to be part of a procession through town, where at the end, in the Governor's box, sit Captain Laughton and Higgins. Jacky decides to joke around. While on the elephant, Jacky stands in front of Mairead and puts her arms out, imitating the Goddess Kali. This outrages the Kali followers, and they chase Jacky and Mairead. They run, led by Ravi. He gets them to the ship so they will be safe. Jacky knows if Ravi is left behind the Kali followers will kill him for helping her, so she grabs him and puts Ravi on the ship. The Captain is outraged when the ship is asked to leave the port immediately.

The book then switches to a letter from Jaimy to Jacky. The letter is not written down, but rather in his head. Jaimy and the others are on the ship Cerberus. Every day, the convicts are allowed on deck for some exercise and fresh air. Jaimy plans a riot. Ian and Arthur create a diversion by singing a song about some of the guards. The two guards, Corporal Vance and Sergeant Napper, are enraged and begin beating some of the convicts. This diversion allows Jaimy to grab a belaying pin from the deck and tuck it under his clothes.

The weeks go by on the Lorelei Lee. One day a fight breaks out between two girls, Violetta Atkins and Jane Wheelden. They were fighting over a man. Jacky tries to break up the fight and ends up in the middle of it. Fighting is forbidden on the ship and is punishable by whipping. However, this time Mr. Ruger decides to punish the girls by rigging up the dunking stool, where the girls will be dunked into the sea for ten seconds. Jacky knows the other two girls would not be able to take the punishment and takes it for them, meaning she would be underwater for 30 seconds. As Jacky is dunked underwater she counts the seconds. She soon realizes that she is being kept longer than she should. Jacky soon passes out and wakes up on the deck. Higgins tells her that something was caught in the winch to reel up the rope. Higgins thinks it was a knitting needle. Mrs. Barnsley, Mrs. MacDonald, and Mrs. Berry are the leaders of the other crews, and don't like Jacky very much. However, they come to Higgins and tell them that even though they haven't gotten along with Jacky, they did not try to harm her. Just then Ravi comes in to inform Jacky of an arriving ship.

All the women come on deck to see the ship Cerberus. While the Captains exchange news and try to trade passengers, Jacky spots her old Irish crew on the ship. Jacky continues to spot more of her old crew, including Mairead's husband, Ian. Mairead yells to Ian and the crew yells back. McBride, seeing Jacky yells, "Fletcher, it's your Jacky." The two girls are at the edge of the ship, and are being held back from jumping off. The Captain tells them they are inflicting punishment to rioting prisoners, and Jacky and Mairead, seeing that their Jaimy and Ian are being hurt, manage to jump on board the Cerberus to save/comfort their men. The guards force Jacky to watch as Jaimy is beaten, doing the same for Mairead and Ian. But afterwards as Jacky is kissing Jaimy (who is nearing unconsciousness), she slyly puts her shiv in his boot. The Captain throws the girls over and sails off.

Back on the Lorelei Lee, the girls continue to travel, all while First Mate Ruger continues to eye Jacky and Mairead. One day, while partying on the deck the Captain, obviously drunk, yells for more everything and just dies, his last word being, "More."

With Ruger as captain, everyone stays below as much as possible. He drinks himself into a frenzy and brutally abuses anyone in his way. He continues to pursue Jacky and Mairead. All the gangs decide to form a truce with each other as well as the other ship officers to keep everyone safe from Ruger. Meanwhile, the boys plan to hijack the Cerberus, sail to the nearest port, supply themselves, and sail to Australia to save their girls. Their opportunity arrives when the crew is drunk during the Captain's birthday and their escort ship is off to escort a more important ship. They manage to steal a club and considerable amount of rope and plot to start their take over the next night. When the guards walk by, McBride starts telling a rather nasty joke involving Jacky, himself, and Jaimy. Jaimy, pissed off, tells Arthur the two will settle scores later.

The next night, Padric and Ian tease Weisling, their guard, about how he got beat up by Jacky on the Wolverine. They make up a song to an Irish drinking tune about his embarrassment, and soon the Weasel unlocks the door to beat them, but Duggan puts out the Weasel with their stolen belaying pin. They unchain themselves with the Weasel's keys and wait for the other two guards to come out. The other two guards walk by and young Daniel Connolly begs them for protection from his bigger and meaner cellmates. They guards decide to unlock him to have some fun with him themselves (they mean to rape him), when Jaimy and McBride kill both of them. The men steal the guards' uniforms, raid the ship's weaponry, and go out killing and injuring most of the other guards, throwing them overboard in a life raft. They gain full control of the ship and set sail for Batavia (Jakarta). Jaimy and McBride see this as a perfect time to settle their scores and get into a fight. Jaimy wins, claims captain and appoints his officers. Ian as first mate, Padric as second, and McBride as third.

Meanwhile, Ruger finally decides that he has waited long enough and orders Jacky to his room. She refuses, telling him that she is married, and if he forces her, it will be rape. Ruger tells her he knows of her sham marriage and this time orders both Jacky and Mairead to his room. Mairead tells him to back away and that she has a baby. Jacky tries to save her by telling Ruger he can have her, and leave Mairead alone, but he does not. Ruger, angered, punches Mairead in her stomach, killing her baby. He goes back into his cabin while the other women help Mairead recover. Jacky, angered, shoots Ruger with an arrow, but misses as he ducks and runs away. To keep the officers from killing Jacky for attempted murder, most of the women barricade themselves below the ship, and only will let officers pass for supplies if they agree to keep to their terms of truce.

Under deck, Jacky and Higgins make themselves a makeshift room for the two and discuss matters with Ravi and their monkey Josephine, who they picked up from India. Higgins tells her it is unlikely that Ruger will be convicted of anything, while she might be hanged for attempted murder. Jacky dimly sees that her only hope is if Jaimy helps her, which is unlikely. Just then, a ship has been spotted and Jacky runs up to see if it is Jaimy.

The ship turns out to be a pirate's Chinese junk and attacks them by throwing phosphorus rockets at them from a long distance. Deciding that she must fight fire with fire, and that no one should hurt the ship she paid for, she takes a few of her own arrows, as well as some flaming pitch, and drops down in a life boat with Ravi to defend her Lorelei Lee. She manages to set fire to the junk's sails, which burn quickly as they are made of straw-like material. But, as she finishes off their sails, the Chinese shoot their arrows at her and manage to take her and Ravi captive.

On board, a woman stops her execution, and her words are translated to Jacky by an Italian monk. The woman, whose name is Cheng Shih, is obviously the boss, asks the monk to record Jacky's entire life. The monk and Jacky talk and eventually she learns that Cheng Shih is the most dreaded pirate in these lands and commanded hundred of ships. The monk mocks her, as she was proud only a minute ago by having command of two ships in her days as a pirate.

The monk, Brother Arcangelo Rossetti, tells Jacky that Cheng Shih is intrigued by her and wants to keep her. When meeting Cheng Shih in her cabin, she tells Jacky that she does not believe her story. Jacky, miffed at this, shows her how she can dive for coins. She takes all her clothes off and jumps into the water, quickly getting the coin, but staying down long enough to think her drowned. She swims around the ship, jumps on deck, surprising Cheng Shih. Impressed by Jacky's ability, the pirate takes Jacky under her wing, dressing her in all the latest Chinese fashions, and treating her as a pet.

The book goes back to Jaimy who is stuck in the middle of the ocean and cannot go anywhere as the wind will not blow. He is fearful of Chinese pirates that scout out his ship daily.

Later in Cheng Shih's cabin, Jacky learns of how she always keeps a Buddha statue near her to remind herself of a debt unpaid. It turns out while raiding the monastery there, Cheng Shih also tried to take their giant golden Buddha statue, but it sank under water. Seeing all the monks dive after it and drowning, she vowed to bring it back up. But no amount of tugging would do the job. She marked the water there and left, failing in her task.

Hearing this, Jacky thinks of how her diving bell managed to help her pull up the bow of a sunken Spanish ship, and the next morning proposes to bring the statue back up, if she, Jaimy, and the passengers of the Lorelei Lee (as well as the ship) are all freed. Cheng Shih is angry and whips Jacky for even thinking of asking for freedom, but agrees to let everyone go except Jacky. To show Jacky that she is under the ownership and protection of her, Cheng Shih orders her assistant to tattoo on her neck a golden dragon, this being Shih's mark.

They immediately change course and sail toward the Cerberus, their plan to take over the ship and sail to the Lorelei Lee. It is unknown to them that Jaimy has managed to take command of the vessel. They come closer to the unarmed ship, and are about to fire when Jacky sees that management has changed. She climbs aboard, stopping the slaughter, and tells Jaimy to throw down his sword. When he does, she tells him about her plan, and together the two ships sail toward the Lorelei Lee. While together, Jacky and Jaimy spend a lot of time with each other, much to the displeasure of Cheng Shih. One such occasion includes a very saucy time in a bathtub. There, Jaimy realizes that Jacky is a sort of slave to the pirate and is angered. He demands Jacky to sneak off with him, as he is afraid she will be used as a prostitute. Jacky comforts him, and quickly changes the subject and asks Jaimy what his plan is for the prisoners. He tells her that he will pose as the now-dead captain of the ship, collect the money for delivering the prisoners and sail back with her. She tells him that it is a great plan, but does not mention that she cannot leave. Jaimy asks about her marriage to Higgins, and Jacky starts to tell him it is a sham, but Jaimy stops her saying that he could never be jealous of their good friend Higgins. Jacky is sure he thinks she is no longer a maiden and wants to tell him that she is, but says nothing to make sure he would still love her any way she was.

When they reach the Lorelei Lee, they board the ship and Ian kills Captain Ruger for killing his unborn son, and laying his hands on Mairead. Everyone has a happy reunion and they all sail towards the sunken Buddha. Higgins and Jacky have a talk about their marriage, and agree to get a divorce. Higgins can see that Jacky is anxious to be back with Jaimy, so the two get divorced in the quick Muslim way, since they are close to Muslim waters. The crew sets up the diving bell, and Jacky, donning her swimsuit, dives for the statue. She brings it up in no time and the Chinese fix it to its original place. But in the process Chi-Chi (Cheng Shih's assistant) falls into the water. Jacky saves him, making him her assistant.

As they sail back, Jaimy and Jacky have to say goodbye. Jaimy is outraged and wants to fight the pirates, as he cannot believe that they are keeping his Jacky as a slave. Jacky tells him that she is treated well, like a pet, and he should not worry, as she will have lots of adventures around Asia, and that adventure was why she got on the Dolphin years ago. She tells him to go back to Australia, continue with his plan and to start a life elsewhere without her. Jacky begins to cry, and when Jaimy tries to hug her she tells him not to, as Shih is watching and will kill them both. Jaimy protests saying that he will fight them all for her freedom, but she tells him to leave. She asks Cheng Shih if she can kiss Jaimy one last time, but the pirate says no. Jacky's heart breaks at how she will never be able to feel Jaimy again and sobs into her hands. The monk quickly explains that Cheng Shih meant that she would not allow Jacky to stay, and that she wants Jacky to leave with her fiancé as she would hate her Golden Child to feel so sad.

Not wanting to wait as Cheng Shih might change her mind, the two run off the ship, quickly climb their ships and set sail to Australia. En route to Australia, Jacky and Jaimy are mostly on separate ships, and she makes no move to invite him over, telling him she is busy. In reality, she just wanted to distance herself from him, as she did not feel ready for sex. She had known that would be on Jaimy's mind, as Mairead and Ian had been "busy making another Irish baby" and McBride had given him a hard time about her easy ways.

At Australia, Jaimy and Higgins act as the captains of the two ships, collect the money, leave the prisoners, and sail a good distance away to talk matters through. Jaimy and Jacky, now finally alone, begin talking. She tells him to sail to Singapore and spend every cent of his money to arm his ship. Jaimy is confused as he thought that this would be the perfect time for him and Jacky to make up for lost time in their relationship, but he goes, with only a few kisses from his fiancé.

She later has a talk with Higgins, just like the one on the Nancy B., but this time she agrees with Higgins, admitting that getting married and having children could wait until she was older and more successful. Higgins smiles quietly, and it is obvious he knew she would say this.

A few days after the ships separate, the Dart (the Cerberus 's companion ship) returns from its different duty to find and sail with it back to England. The Captain climbs aboard the Lorelei and Jacky sees that it is Joseph Jared, one of the men she had a relationship with on the Wolverine, as since then. He tells her that he has finally met her after what seemed like forever. He technically has authority over her, as she is an escaped prisoner, and he wants her in bed. She says no politely and persists, but Jared pulls her onto the bed anyway. Just then the Cerberus pulls up, with Jaimy jumping aboard and Jacky smiles and asks Jared, "Now who exactly is the prisoner of whom?"

The three captains discuss what to do with their illegal profits, the ships, and where to stay, as both Jacky and Jaimy are wanted. Jared insists that it is his duty to turn in Jacky and Jaimy (he is still angry from Jacky's refusal, and the fact that Jaimy is actually present this time to stop him from getting his way with Jacky), but seeing the others' expressions and their armed guards, he quickly agrees that he is open for discussion. Together, they agree to let the Dart sail with them to England, where the Cerberus and it will stay, and where Jaimy will go with his lawyer to plead his innocence in court. Jared, now a captain, will vouch for him with his influence. Jacky, along with the Irish crew and Higgins, would go to Boston, and continue with Faber Shipping, as all chances of her acquittal is lost.

The three shake hands and are about to continue with the matter of the money, when Chi-Chi yells, warning them of a typhoon. The book ends with Jacky panicking about the fast approaching storm.

== Characters ==
- Mary 'Jacky' Faber: The protagonist of the story. She became an orphan after her family died. When she was about thirteen years old, she disguised herself as a boy and joined a British Navy ship as ship's boy. Jacky has been convicted of defrauding the king and been sentenced to life in the penal colony of Australia.
- James 'Jaimy' Fletcher: Jacky's true love. Jaimy has been convicted of defrauding the king and has been sentenced to seven years in Australia.
- John Higgins: Jacky's assistant, he joins the Lorelei Lee as the Purser's assistant so he can be close to Jacky.
- Mairead Delaney McConnaughy: Jacky's friend and wife to Ian McConnaughy. She is also sent to Australia.
- Captain Laughton: The Captain of the "Lorelei Lee".

== Reception ==
Lisa Ann Verge, writing for the Historical Novel Society, called The Wake of the Lorelei Lee "a winner" and highlighted Meyer's strength in "juggling seven books worth of beloved characters and adding a full contingent more".

Booklist's Carolyn Phelan praised the novel's plotting, writing that "Meyer knows how to spin an exciting yarn, particularly on the high seas". She noted, however, that "Jacky shows some of the cultural insensitivity of her times when she briefly explores India".

The audiobook narrated by Katherine Kellgren received an Earphone Award from AudioFile, who indicated that Kellgren provided an "outstanding performance". School Library Journal called Kellgren's narration "brilliant", adding that it turns "this story into great theater."
