= In the Belly of the Bloodhound =

2006 novel by L.A. Meyer

- Author: Louis A. Meyer
- Audio read by: Katherine Kellgren
- Cover artist: Cliff Nielsen
- Language: English
- Series: Bloody Jack Adventure
- Genre: Young adult, Historical novel
- Publisher: Harcourt Children's Books
- Publication date: October 1, 2006
- Publication place: United States
- Media type: Print (hardback), Audiobook
- Pages: 528 pages
- ISBN: 978-0-15-205557-8
- OCLC: 62493095
- LC Class: PZ7.M57172 In 2006
- Preceded by: Under the Jolly Roger
- Followed by: Mississippi Jack

In the Belly of the Bloodhound: Being an Accountant of a Particularly Peculiar Adventure in the Life of Jacky Faber is a historical novel written by L.A. Meyer. It is the fourth book in the Bloody Jack Adventure series about a teenage girl named Jacky Faber, alias Bloody Jack, set in the early 19th century. This installment follows the heroine as she returns on land from her adventures on the seas in the previous novel.

In the Belly of the Bloodhound is preceded by Bloody Jack (2002), Curse of the Blue Tattoo (2004), and Under the Jolly Roger (2005). It is followed by Mississippi Jack (2007), My Bonny Light Horseman (2008), Rapture of the Deep (2009), The Wake of the Lorelei Lee (2010), The Mark of the Golden Dragon (2011), Viva Jacquelina! (2012), Boston Jacky (2013), and Wild Rover No More (2016).

== Plot ==
This novel follows Jacky Faber upon her return to Boston. In her small sailboat, the Morning Star, she sneaks into port past two British ships. When she is out of sight, she finds a young boy, Jim Tanner, to watch her boat for her. She goes into town to talk with her lawyer, Ezra Pickering. They decide it is best for Jacky to return to the Lawson Peabody School for Young Girls. The school is being rebuilt with bricks after a fire caused when she knocked over a lamp while fighting for her life. The next day, Ezra, Jim, and Jacky take the Morning Star to Dovecote to see Amy, who is in a deep depression. Jacky surprises her by bringing her lunch to her. She tells Amy her story and then the two of them join Ezra and Randall for lunch.

The months pass after that. When school starts again, Jacky greets her old friends. Her old enemy, Clarissa, has brought a slave back with her, and Jacky is outraged. After about a month, Higgins comes to the school and becomes head of the serving staff.

Months go by, and classes too. One day, all the girls except Amy go on a planned field trip to the shore. Jacky is surprised that Mistress Pimm does not come, and is even more surprised when she realizes that Higgins is not there either. Only Mr. Harrison, the man leading their trip, and his slave Jerome are there. When they are taken to the docks, Jacky refuses to get in the lifeboat to take them to their picnic spot without Mistress Pimm or Higgins. Mr. Harrison then points a gun at her and forces her to get in the boat.

The girls are then taken onto a ship and learn Mr Harrison is a man named Colonel Bartholomew Simon, where Clarissa angrily calls him by his more popular name, "Blackman Bart". Clarissa recognizes him as a slave dealer, who often handles transactions with her father's plantation. Blackman Bart informs the girls that they will be sold into slavery in North Africa. While the girls are hysterical, Jacky quickly shoves her seabag full of supplies down into the hold. Jacky organizes the group. She divides the girls into three groups and assigns a leader to each group. The three leaders are Jacky, Dolley, and Clarissa. They find a rat hole into a storage room, and make plans to widen it with Jacky's shiv to escape through.

There is a guard at the door to the girls' prison that the crew calls Dummy. Jacky soon finds out that he is actually Hugh the Grand, or Hughie, from the Rooster Charlie Gang on the streets of London. Jacky reveals herself as "Little Mary", now Jacky, and he recognizes her.

The next day, a man named Sin-Kay enters the hold. He had posed as Blackman Bart's slave, when they were really business partners. He organizes the girls into an alphabetical line, and is quickly introduced to the wrath of Clarissa. He quickly singles out Clarissa and Jacky as the two "troublemakers". The girls begin to listen to their leaders of their groups, Jacky, Clarissa, and Dolley. Only one girl, Elspeth Goodwin, cannot cope. She becomes hysterical and emotional, begging to be sent home.

After a week, Elspeth rats Jacky out as the leader of the girls in a last-ditch attempt to be sent home. Jacky then gets a lashing with the cat-o-nine tails for organizing a hunger strike among the girls. The hunger strike was in response to the requests of the girls (better food and cleaner conditions).

As the girls work on widening the rat hole and sneaking supplies through, Jacky bargains with two of the less aggressive sailors, Mick and Keefe. They help get the girls clean water for washing in exchange for Jacky revealing parts of herself. While one girl, Constance Howell, expresses outrage and indignation, Jacky continues to do so, in exchange for every girl getting water to wash with.

Jacky also works on spreading superstitious stories through the crew. She has the youngest girl, Rebecca, wake up screaming about seeing a ghost, to scare the extremely superstitious crew. She also tells the sailors that the Captain is planning on killing them.

Two riots are also caused during the girls captivity. Clarissa continues to harass Sin-Kay and call him offensive names. The girls run out and cause trouble when he attempts to throw Clarissa overboard. Jacky also sneaks out of the Hold as the "black ghost", and is seen by two sailors. When the sailors become terrified and create pandemonium, Jacky sneaks back in and covers for herself by kissing Clarissa in the hold, claiming that the two of them are "particular friends." Jacky notes that Clarissa resists the kiss at first, and then doesn't, and that Jacky has "been kissed by worse."

Soon, the hole is big enough to escape through. The girls create a 100-second fuse to ignite the powder magazine and aid their escape. They all make it out the hole and make their escape in one of the lifeboats, with the help of Jacky's old friend, Hugh the Grand. Shortly after their escape onto the life boat, Hugh dies from an injury he received while protecting Jacky on the ship and Jacky falls ill from a wound on her leg.

Jacky wakes up on a Royal Navy Ship, HMS Juno, which is taking the girls back to Boston. Before they get to Boston, the Juno has to make a quick stop in New York, where they meet up with Henry Hoffman, the school's stable boy and fiancé of one of the girls. That girl rides back to Boston with Henry ahead of the others.

When word of the girls' rescue and survival comes, everyone is excited and prepares for their return. When the Juno gets there, parents and loved ones, including Jaimy, are waiting. The Juno docks and the girls step off. The last three to get off are Dolley, Clarissa, and Jacky. The book ends with two marines stopping her before she can get off the ship and telling her she is under arrest for piracy.

== Characters ==
- Mary "Jacky" Faber: Series protagonist. Once an orphan, a schoolgirl, ship's boy, midshipman, privateer, and accused pirate, Jacky now returns to Boston to continue her education while hiding out from the Admiralty.
- Amy Trevelyne: Jacky's best friend, who has written a book about Jacky's early life.
- Clarissa Worthington Howe: Jacky's schoolmate and mortal enemy. Clarissa's inner depths are explored in more detail as she forms an unlikely alliance with Jacky to lead the girls in their escape from the Bloodhound.
- Katy Deere: A serving girl at Lawson Peabody with whom Jacky once worked. During the girls' captivity, Katy reveals her traumatic past to Jacky, and decides to quit her profession and return to the west after surviving her ordeal.
- Sin-Kay/Jerome: A slaver who oversees the expedition to bring the girls to Africa to be sold. The book's central antagonist, Sin-Kay is killed during the girls' daring escape, during which he is crippled and then eaten by sharks.
- Captain Blodgett: Captain of the Bloodhound who whips Jacky and Clarissa to make an example when the girls attempt a hunger strike. He is also devoured by sharks when the ship sinks.
- Bo'sun Chubbuck: The brutal bo'sun of the Bloodhound. Killed by Katy Deere during the escape.
- James "Jaimy" Emerson Fletcher: Jacky's betrothed, who spends the novel trying to figure out what happened to Jacky.
- John Higgins: Jacky's loyal steward.
- Ezra Pickering: Jacky's lawyer in Boston.
- Hugh the Grand: Jacky's simple-minded childhood friend who is hired onto the Bloodhound as muscle for Sin-Kay, who refers to him as "Dummy."
- Dobbs: Mistress Pimm's crabby handyman. He sells out the girls to the slavers, but is killed by Chubbuck as part of the plan to make the girls' disappearance look like an accident.
- Beadle and Strunk: The private detectives who previously sold Jacky to Reverend Mather. When they come poking around for her again and assault her coxswain, Jacky leads them into a trap, wherein they are killed by Jacky's friends John Thomas and Smasher McGee.

== Reception ==
While highlighting the merits of the adventure described in the novel, Booklist's Carolyn Phelan wrote, "The real pleasure comes from watching this cunning, unconventional, warmhearted heroine in action".

On behalf of School Library Journal, Tricia Melgaard wrote, "It's wonderful to see the girls rise to the challenge and use their brains to outwit their male captors. The relationship between Jacky and her arch-nemesis Clarissa Howe is a hoot". Discussing the audiobook, Melgaard praised Kellgren's ability to "juggl[e] American, French, and British accents with ease", noting that "her vivid delivery of Meyer's top-notch dialogue brings the tale to life".

== Accolades ==
In the Belly of the Bloodhound is a Junior Library Guild book.

The audiobook narrated by Katherine Kellgren was an honor book for the 2009 Odyssey Award. The American Library Association also included it on their 2010 list of Amazing Audiobooks for Young Adults.
