= The Queen of the Tearling =

Novel by Erika Johansen

- First edition cover
- Author: Erika Johansen
- Genre: Fantasy novel
- Published: 2014 (HarperCollins)
- Publication place: United States
- Pages: 488 (first edition)
- ISBN: 978-0-06-229036-6

The Queen of the Tearling is the debut novel of Erika Johansen. It is set on a fictional landmass several centuries in the future, and is the first novel of a fantasy trilogy. The other books in the trilogy are The Invasion of the Tearling (2015) and The Fate of the Tearling (2016).

== Plot ==
Princess Kelsea Raleigh Glynn must defeat the powers of the Red Queen, who is out to destroy her. She must journey to the royal castle to claim her throne, and is accompanied only by the loyal Queen's Guard which is led Carroll and the mysterious Lazarus. Along the way she must earn the respect of her people and fix the broken shambles of the Kingdom of Tear.

== Reaction ==
The Detroit Free Press reported Emma Watson "conceded she couldn't put the book down. Having sworn she'd never do another franchise, her interest is a gigantic compliment...".

== Film adaptation ==
Before the first novel was published it was announced in June 2013 that Warner Bros. was developing a film adaptation. Emma Watson was cast to star as Princess Kelsea. By February 2014 Watson revealed in an interview that she was also attached as an executive producer. It was reported that David Heyman was also attached to produce the film. By December 2014 In an interview Watson commented 'My agent called and said: "I have to be honest, this is a trilogy!" I was reluctant, but when I read the book, I really wanted to spend three years in that world,' she explains. 'It's going to be intense and I am going to have to get physically very fit, build some muscle and learn how to wield a sword.'" Since there has been no mention of any further development of the film, the project has likely been trapped in development hell.
