= Mississippi Jack =

2007 novel by L. A. Meyers

- Author: Louis A. Meyer
- Audio read by: Katherine Kellgren
- Cover artist: Cliff Nielsen
- Language: English
- Genre: Young Adult's, Historical novel
- Publisher: Harcourt Children's Books
- Publication date: September 1, 2007
- Publication place: United States
- Media type: Print (Hardback), Audiobook
- Pages: 624 pp
- Preceded by: In the Belly of the Bloodhound
- Followed by: My Bonny Light Horseman

Mississippi Jack: Being an Account of the Further Waterborne Adventures of Jacky Faber, Midshipman, Fine Lady, and the Lily of the West is a historical novel written by L.A. Meyer, published in 2007. It is the fifth book in the Bloody Jack Adventure series about a teenage girl named Jacky Faber, alias Bloody Jack, set in the early 19th century. This installment follows Jacky when she and her schoolmates return to Boston after being on a slave ship for several months

Mississippi Jack is preceded by Bloody Jack (2002), Curse of the Blue Tattoo (2004), Under the Jolly Roger (2005), and In the Belly of the Bloodhound (2006). It is followed by My Bonny Light Horseman (2008), Rapture of the Deep (2009), The Wake of the Lorelei Lee (2010), The Mark of the Golden Dragon (2011), Viva Jacquelina! (2012), Boston Jacky (2013), and Wild Rover No More (2016).

== Plot ==
Following the events from In the Belly of the Bloodhound, Jacky heads toward Boston and her true love, Jaimy Fletcher. However, as she approaches the shore where Jaimy awaits, the British Navy captures her and accuses her of piracy and treason. With the help of her loyal servant and friend Higgins, Jackie escapes west, where she ultimately outsmarts Mike Fink and takes over his boat, which she turns into a showboat and casino. Jaimy treks through the wilderness trying to reunite with Jacky, but they keep missing one another. As Jacky travels down the Mississippi River toward New Orleans with her newfound friends, she faces dangerous situations, meets new and old enemies, shows off her various talents, and proves her bravery.

== Characters ==
- Jacky Faber- The main protagonist of the entire series; now sixteen years old and proclaimed a pirate by King George, Jacky takes up the American Wilderness and starts a casino showboat business.
- James 'Jaimy' Emerson Fletcher- Jacky's lover for the entire book series; throughout the series, he's always been one step behind Jacky. On grounds of their distant relationship, Jaimy has an affair with country girl, Clementine Jukes.
- John Higgins- Jacky's devoted butler and right-hand man throughout Jacky's adventure through America.
- Mike Fink- An American keelboat legend and feared by the Yankee townfolk, Mike Fink knows the rivers like the back of his hand and being victim to Jacky's wit, he loses his keelboat to her and vows to kill her.
- Clementine Amaryllis Jukes- The daughter of an alcoholic, murderous farmer; Clementine saves Jaimy from death and sails with Jaimy in pursuit of Jacky before she learns Jacky is another woman and Clementine takes up a position on Jacky's showboat.
- Yancy Beauregard Cantrell- The sharp card-dealing Creole gentleman, Cantrell's widowed and raises a daughter that serves a purpose in an Abolitionist scam of his. Cantrell serves a primary role in the book as he is one of the many guests that take the entire route to New Orleans aboard Jacky's casino-boat.
- Captain Lord Richard Allen- A womanizing young captain of King George's fleet who is in charge of a deal with the American Indians to kill for scalps and money. Jacky begins an affair with Allen as soon as they come to terms.
- Jim Tanner- Another right-hand man of Jacky's; Tanner is always given secondhand jobs and it's obvious he does not appreciate some of the assignments he is given but after Clementine's split from Jaimy, she takes up perfectly with Tanner.
- Lieutenant Flashby- An antagonist of the book, Flashby is part of Allen's partnership with the Indians and secretly knows who Jacky Faber truly is. He has Allen kidnap Jacky, but their plan is foiled, and Jacky forces him, along with his cohort Moseley, to walk the plank into the Mississippi.
- Crow Jane- Jacky's showboat cook and personal bodyguard.
- The Hawkes Boys ('Thaniel and Matty)- Some hoodlums Crow Jane used to run with that hired as Jacky's bodyguards.
- Mam'selle Claudelle de Bourbon- A prostitute from New Orleans, Jacky resorts with her once she reaches New Orleans.
- Lightfoot, Tepeki, Chee-a-Quat, and the Indian tribe- An Indian tribe Jacky befriends before being exposed by Flashby; even though Lightfoot and Chee-a-Quat are evidently angered and shocked, they come back to rescue her from the British.
- Solomon- A negro slave that Jacky and the crew up with and save from slave masters. Solomon is proven to be very intelligent with a guitar and is the reason Jacky is tarred and feathered in New Orleans for by the feared Beam family.
- Katy Deere- Another dear friend of Jacky's from her Lawson Peabody serving-girl days. Katy continues to be developed in this book, heading out west with Jacky to settle an old family score.
- Chloe Cantrell- The daughter of Yancy Cantrell. Plays the harpsichord.
- Reverend Clawson- A Christian preacher that leads a revival as part of Jacky's routine show. He is one of the many guests that travel with Jacky the entire route to New Orleans.
- Daniel Prescott- A boy who fell victim to the Cave-in-Rock bandits. He travels with Jacky the whole way to New Orleans.
- The Beam Family- A Bible-thumping group of hypocritical racists that has Jacky arrested and punished (tar and feather) for helping Solomon escape to freedom. They are all eventually killed by Katy, Lightfoot, and Chee-a-quat.
- Mr. McCoy and Mr. Beatty- Two highwaymen that nearly kill Jaimy.
- Captain Rutherford- The ruthless captain in charge of arresting Jacky and sending her back to King George in the beginning.
- The Lawson Peabody School Girls- Jacky's allies that try to help free her from Captain Rutherford and the British.
- Ezra Pickering- Jacky's trusted attorney.

== Allusions ==
=== Historical events ===
Jacky begins to market her own patent medicine consisting of an alcoholic tincture of opium (better known as laudanum) and Kentucky bourbon, which she markets during medicine shows. Most patent medicines of the time were made up with similar ingredients and similar lavish claims for their efficacy. Use of these compounds was widespread and unregulated.

The crew encounter a secret abolitionist running a slave-selling scam in which the "slave" is sold, and then escapes to be sold again and again. Similar plots were sometimes used to trick runaways into cooperating with a sale which would turn out to be final. After the import of foreign slaves was forbidden, the demand for slaves became very high and numerous types of deceit and slave-stealing became common. Jacky's crew encounters a family of rogues who make their living trying to repossess escaped slaves in the fashion of Patty Cannon.

Jacky herself attempts to pass for quadroon or octoroon as a disguise at one point, in an inversion of the usual trick, which was to pass people who were an eighth or a quarter African heritage as white. Several times, Jacky reflects on the diversity of her crew, which includes Native Americans, Africans and African-Americans, American Appalachians, British such as herself and her butler (or First Mate) Higgins, and so on. This reflects the reality of pirate crews of the day, which often contained escaped black slaves.

=== Historic people ===
- Mike Fink was a real keelboater, reputed to tell tall tales.
- The Lafitte brothers were real pirates; Meyer has a subsidiary character note as Jacky's crew approaches New Orleans, Jean Lafitte made most of his money as a fence of stolen goods and a source of illegally imported slaves.
- Near the end of the book, an adopted white Shawnee called Lightfoot, a rifleman who always travels with his native Shawnee "brother," reveals his white surname to be "Bumpus" in a tribute to James Fenimore Cooper's Natty Bumppo.
- Crow Jane's niece might be a reference to Sacajawea, as she "has been on that Lewis and Clark Expedition across the new Louisiana Territiory".

== Reception ==
Mississippi Jack is a Junior Library Guild book.

Booklist's Carolyn Phelan called the novel "lengthy, episodic, and sometimes raunchy story", noting that it "meanders along with many entertaining scenes, but it sometimes loses its focus and even the buoyant spirit that is the series' hallmark". Kristen Oravec, writing for School Library Journal, agreed with Phelan's assessment. They though the novel's "premise is promising and the action is swift at the beginning", but that "the plot slows down significantly".

Although previous reviews of the series praised Jacky's character, Oravec thought her "larger-than-life character [...] stretches the bounds of plausibility". Further, they considered the novel's other characters "flat and one-dimensional".
