= Rapture of the Deep (novel) =

2009 novel by Louis A. Meyer

- Author: L.A. Meyer
- Audio read by: Katherine Kellgren
- Cover artist: Cliff Nielsen
- Language: English
- Series: Bloody Jack Adventure
- Genre: Young adult, historical novel
- Publisher: Harcourt Children's Books
- Publication date: September 16, 2009
- Publication place: United States
- Media type: Print (hardback), Audiobook
- Pages: 468 pp
- Preceded by: My Bonny Light Horseman
- Followed by: The Wake of the Lorelei Lee

Rapture of the Deep: Being an Account of the Further Adventures of Jacky Faber, Soldier, Sailor, Mermaid, Spy is a historical novel by L.A. Meyer, published in 2009. It is the seventh book in the Bloody Jack book series about a teenage girl named Jacky Faber, alias Bloody Jack, set in the early 19th century. In this installment, Jacky returns from her 'history-defining' adventure as a Parisian nightclub spy and messenger for Napoleon Bonaparte.

Rapture of the Deep is preceded by Bloody Jack (2002), Curse of the Blue Tattoo (2004), Under the Jolly Roger (2005), In the Belly of the Bloodhound (2006), Mississippi Jack (2007), and My Bonny Light Horseman (2008). It is followed by The Wake of the Lorelei Lee (2010), The Mark of the Golden Dragon (2011), Viva Jacquelina! (2012), Boston Jacky (2013), and Wild Rover No More (2016).

== Plot summary ==
On the day that Jacky Faber is to wed her true love, Jaimy, she is kidnapped by British Naval Intelligence and forced to embark on yet another mission for the Crown, searching for sunken Spanish gold off the coast of Havana. Along the way, Jacky and her mates find more than they have bargained for.

== Story ==
Minutes after the final confrontation at the end of My Bonny Light Horseman, Jacky’s schooner, the Nancy B. Alsop, comes to receive Jacky from Paris. Once aboard, her butler Master John Higgins cleans her up and Jacky discusses her duty as a nightclub dancer, her position as spy for the British, and her relationship with Jean-Paul.

Jacky is reunited with Jaimy, and the two decide to get married when at home in Britain. When in London, she reunites with friends and family and dines with Jaimy's family.

On the day of the wedding, Mairead, Judy, and Joannie help get Jacky ready, but the wedding is interrupted by British Intelligence and Jackie and Jamie are taken away. Jacky is reunited with Mr. Peel and Lord Grenville, who inform Jacky of the assignment at hand. In 1733, the ship Santa Magdalena sunk while carrying millions of gold in coins. Britain wants to retrieve that gold to help the economy and Jacky is promised a percentage of that gold and a possible pardon from the King, despite her crimes of piracy. Jacky and Jamie are given separate ships: the Dolphin and the Nancy B. Alsop. The Dolphin is commandeered by Captain Hannibal Hudson, while Jacky captains the Nancy B. Jaimy and Lieutenant Flashby are stationed on the Dolphin. Jacky is assigned to sail to the Florida Keys to the locationof the Santa Magdalena. Jackie and Jamie depart on their two separate ships and sail for Boston. In Spanish waters, Jacky is required to take up a disguise as an American sponge diver.

Jacky prepares to revisit the Lawson Peabody School for Young Girls. She sees her friend and biographer, Amy Trevelyne, who has recently taken a liking for Ezra Pickering.

Eventually, Jacky reunites with Captain Hudson and Jaimy. Hudson show Jacky a diving bell, which will aid Jacky underwater while she hunts for the Santa Magdalena gold supply. Before setting sail for the Keys, Jacky tells Captain Hudson to be on the lookout for any ship-jumpers that might get on board for information and turn it in to the opposing forces such as the Spanish. Jacky and Jaimy enjoy time together but must depart for a couple of weeks.

While docked in Charleston, Jacky, Davy, and Tink, visit a couple of taverns where Jacky performs songs on the pennywhistle and violin. The next day, Jacky and the group run into a slave auction. Jacky is deeply angered by this kind of trade, but bids for an old slave woman named Jemimah and brings her aboard her ship. Jemimah is taken in as the ship's cook.

When they get to the Keys, Jacky starts swimming immediately; her first dive is a dangerous one as she has a run-in with a moray eel. Despite Dr. Sebastian's interest in the creature, Jacky decapitates the eel.

While sailing around a nearby island, Jacky prepares to dive and find the Santa Magdalena. Spurred on by Dr. Sebastian, Jacky dives into the water and finds the sunken ship. Unfortunately, a Spanish man-of-war called the San Cristobal comes across the Nancy B. and board it. The officer in charge demands who the fleet is and what's their purpose in Spanish waters. Unconvinced, the men scrounge the Nancy B., although they find no evidence to prove the crew are fakes. After Jacky emerges from the water and offends the officer in charge, the Spanish and the Nancy B. sail separately for Havana.

Once they dock, the lieutenant from the San Cristobal introduces himself as Juan Carlos Cisneros y Siquieros. Jacky and Juan Carlos instantly dislike each other. Meanwhile, Jemimah decides to explore the town and see if she likes it enough to make her own roots. Jacky, Davy, and Tink explore the town; taking in some cockfighting matches and performing at the Cafe Americano, among other activities. Soon, Jemimah comes back to be a part of the crew.

One night at the Cafe Americano, Jacky runs into old flame Flaco Jimenez and is introduced to Flaco's new first mate, El Feo. As they talk, it is revealed that Captain Hudson let a ship-jumper on board the Dolphin, who gathered information for the Spanish. Jaimy and the Dolphin crew soon meet up with Jacky, who has spent her time preparing for cockfighting matches. Jacky gets ready for her first descent using the diving bell; Tink makes Jacky some swim fins and she gets used to the diving bell's design. As they make preparations, Flaco Jimenez and his ship returns, making the crew uneasy.

Jacky gets underwater towards the ship with a grappling hook and begins the scavenging operation, eventually finding the ship's vault Inside the vault, Jacky finds the gold supply of the ship.

In the process of getting the bell and gold up into the ship, Jacky contracts nitrogen narcosis. Jacky don't feel anything but when the pain from the Rapture of the Deep starts to kick in, she begins convulsing and shrieking until they get her back into the water to ease the condition. Jaimy, even though he is nervous about being in the bell under water, takes her down where they make out. Dr. Sebastian is angry with Jacky for getting the condition but eventually has Jacky ushered to bed.

The next day, Jacky starts putting the gold in baskets underwater when her own greed tells her to put fan coral in the baskets and keep the gold for herself. Jacky does it, sneaking the gold into her undersea safehold for Faber Shipping Worldwide.

Soon, Jacky encounters Flaco and his ship El Diablo Rojo and while they talk, Flaco's first mate El Feo plots a mutiny in secret. They hold the Nancy B. and its crew at gunpoint, but soon a fight among the two opposing ships commences. El Feo and his new ship, the Red Devil, retreat, leaving Flaco siding with Jacky.

Back in town, Jacky continues the cockfighting matches and nights at the Cafe Americano.

Jaimy and the rest of the Dolphin crew end up in Kingston. They are invited to the Officers' Club where Jaimy runs into Captain Richard Allen. Jaimy and Captain Allen remember each other and they have an awkward conversation.

After another cockfighting match, Jacky tells Joannie to go collect the winnings, only Joannie goes missing. The crew searches Havana for her and head for the sea, following a tip about Joannie’s kidnapper. While at sea, Jacky’s crew is taken prisoner by El Feo. It's found out that El Feo kidnapped Joannie and Flashby has been working undercover for El Feo as a double agent. El Feo demands to be shown where the gold is at. Jacky lies to El Feo, saying it's all on a nearby island. El Feo has Flashby and his crew sail to the island and look for the treasure. El Feo then takes Jacky to his living quarters where he attempts to rape Jacky. Daniel and Joannie intervene and release El Gringo on El Feo. Jacky's crew then takes over the ship.

Finally the San Cristobal comes into view, attacking both ships, But the Dolphin comes to aid Jacky and the crew just in the nick of time. Jacky reunites with both Jaimy and Captain Allen and fights off the Spanish warship. Cisneros then comes aboard for Jacky personally. Jacky shoots him as he is about to shoot her.

With the battle soon over, Flaco regains his old ship and leaves the battlefield. Jaimy then soon embarks to be an officer in command on the newly named Saint Christopher. When Flaco returns, and the gold is split evenly between the crew. The Spanish sailor then leaves again and Jacky makes her way back to Boston where her crew splits up.

== Reception ==
Rapture of the Deep is a Junior Library Guild book.

Booklist's Carolyn Phelan called Rapture of the Deep a "fast-paced and often amusing swashbuckler" and highlighted how "Meyer weaves details of nineteenth-century history, lore, and ballads."

In a School Library Journal review, Kristen Oravec wrote about main character Jacky, highlighting how "she taunts and teases every man she meets and seems not to care about running around naked or half-naked in front of them." Aside from Jacky, she found the characters "to be little more than cardboard cutouts, especially the pirate". Oravec also pointed out the novel's "sexual innuendo and an attempted rape scene".

Aarene Storms, writing for Shoreline Area News, also pointed out the novel's innuendos, though referred to them as "very tactful". Storms also mentioned the novel's inclusion of "minor cussing" and "some blood shed", though stated, "none of which should alarm any but the most fainthearted of readers."

== Adaptation ==
Narrated by Katherine Kellgren, the audiobook adaptation of Rapture of the Deep was released in 2010. The audiobook includes interviews of Kellgren and Meyer.

In a starred review, Booklist's Connie Rockman wrote, "Kellgren expertly juggles Jacky's Cockney accent, the proper upper-class British tones of Higgins and fiancé Jamie, various speech patterns of Spanish and Caribbean officers and merchants, and the softly cadenced southern tones of Jemima, a cook Jacky buys at a Charleston slave market and promptly sets free."

In 2011, the American Library Association included the audiobook on their top ten list of Amazing Audiobooks for Young Adults.
