= Bloody Jack (novel) =

2002 historical novel by L.A. Meyer

- Author: L.A. Meyer
- Audio read by: Katherine Kellgren
- Cover artist: Cliff Nielsen
- Language: English
- Series: Bloody Jack Adventure series
- Genre: Young adult, historical fiction
- Publisher: Harcourt Children's Books
- Publication date: September 1, 2002
- Publication place: United States
- Media type: Print (hardback & paperback), Audiobook
- Pages: 336
- ISBN: 0-15-216731-5
- OCLC: 48951422
- LC Class: PZ7.M9795 Bl 2002
- Followed by: Curse of the Blue Tattoo

Bloody Jack: Being An Account of the Curious Adventures of Mary “Jacky” Faber, Ship's Boy is a historical novel by L.A. Meyer, published by Harcourt Children's Books in September 2002. It is centered on an orphaned girl in London in the early 19th century during the Napoleonic Wars who dresses as a boy to join the crew of a British warship.

The story is continued in Curse of the Blue Tattoo (2004), Under the Jolly Roger (2005), In the Belly of the Bloodhound (2006), Mississippi Jack (2007), My Bonny Light Horseman (2008), Rapture of the Deep (2009), The Wake of the Lorelei Lee (2010), The Mark of the Golden Dragon (2011), Viva Jacquelina! (2012), Boston Jacky (2013), and Wild Rover No More (2016).

== Plot introduction ==
After losing her entire family to disease, eight-year-old Mary Faber joins a gang of orphans led by the redhaired "Rooster" Charlie, whom she looks up to as a brother. One day, after stealing some bread, Mary stumbles across Charlie's murdered corpse and realizes that her life on the street is over. Donning his clothes, she assumes the identity of "Jack" and joins the crew of HMS Dolphin as a ship's boy.

== Plot summary ==
Mary Faber is a 12-year-old member of Rooster Charlie's child orphan gang in Cheapside, London, in the year 1801, having joined the gang four years earlier when her parents and siblings died from plague. After Charlie is murdered to be sold for medical research, a horrified Mary cuts her hair, puts on Charlie's clothes, and volunteers to serve aboard HMS Dolphin, a man-of-war tasked with hunting French "pirates".

Because Mary can read, she becomes assistant to Phineas Tilden, an American serving as physician's mate and schoolmaster. She quickly befriends her fellow "boys", all of whom are quick to model themselves on the more hardened crewmen. In particular, Mary grows close to James "Jaimy" Fletcher, the son of an impoverished noble family who hopes to earn promotion to midshipman.

Over the course of several months, the boys gradually become accomplished sailors. Jacky forms a close bond with Irish gunner's mate Liam Delaney, who teaches her how to play the penny whistle. As Jacky’s body begins to mature, she sews a new uniform to hide the changes. In response, the captain orders her to make uniforms for all the boys.

While cruising off the coast of North Africa, the captain spots a pirate ship and pursues it. After battering the vessel into submission, Jaimy and Jacky join a boarding attempt. Jacky shoots dead an armed man about to stab Jaimy in the back and is honored for her bravery by being nicknamed "Bloody Jack" by the crew.

Disturbed by the experience, Jacky falls further into depression after learning that one of her shipmates, Benjy, was killed in action. With the Dolphin low on supplies, the captain decides to sail for a nearby island so he can sell his prize and obtain fresh supplies. Jacky begins to menstruate and mistakenly believes that she will soon die.

After landing at Palma, the remaining boys spend their money on blue anchor tattoos, declaring themselves the "Brotherhood of Ship's Boys". Upon having her first menstrual period, Jacky visits a nearby brothel to learn about her condition. Unaware of the truth, the boys assume that she is a "rake" (a womanizer) and taunt her.

Now resupplied, the ship travels to the Caribbean Sea to continue its mission. Bliffil, an abusive midshipman, beats Jacky and puts her in the sick ward with severe injuries. As she cannot so much as lay a finger on the higher-ranking Bliffil, Jacky exacts her revenge by persuading a cowardly midshipman, Mr. Jenkins, to knock down Bliffil in a fight.

A drunken sailor named Bill Sloat discovers Jacky's secret and tries to rape her in the ship's rope locker. Jacky manages to stab him with her shiv, and Sloat falls overboard and drowns. Liam is charged with the murder and sentenced to death, but Jacky confesses and is subsequently tried in his place, with the court freeing her on the grounds of self-defense.

Jacky begins to fall in love with Jaimy. When he decides to leave the ship out of fear of being ostracized for presumed homosexuality, she reveals her true identity to him. Soon after, they arrive in Kingston, Jamaica. Jacky dresses in female clothes to go on a date with Jaimy, only to be interrupted by the other boys, who don’t recognize her. With Jaimy distracting them, she is able to slip back into her disguise and maintain her cover. Davy convinces them to all get earrings, which Jaimy and Jacky take as symbols of their love.

While hunting for a notorious French captain, Gabriel LeFievre ("The Fever"), the Dolphin is ambushed by LeFievre's fireship and begins to sink, though not before managing to cripple LeFievre's vessel. While serving as a lookout, Jacky spots land and alerts the crew, allowing them to beach the ship safely. Davy catches her sleeping in Jaimy's hammock, and she reluctantly tells him that she is a girl.

Tilden proposes a scheme to the crew, using an experimental kite he's been designing to carry a lone passenger and hopefully draw the attention of passing ships. Jacky is chosen for the mission, but the unstable kite breaks free from its moorings and Jacky winds up stranded on a remote part of the island, far from the others. She finds food and shelter and manages to alert the crew. However, LeFierve captures Jacky and orders his men to hang her.

The crew of the Dolphin arrive just as Jacky passes out. When she awakes, LeFierve and his men are dead, and the entire crew is aware of her female nature. After being examined by the ship’s doctor, Jacky is declared to be about fifteen years old, having not known her true age during the past two years of service.

Despite the captain having earlier promoted her to midshipman for exceptional conduct and service, Jacky is discharged from the Royal Navy and sent to Boston, where Tilden has arranged for her to attend Lawson Peabody's School for Girls under her assumed name. Accepting her fate, Jacky embraces her shipmates before stepping off.

== Characters ==
- Mary 'Jacky' Faber: The protagonist of the series, she came from a middle-class London family who all died of a plague when she was about seven or eight years old. Suddenly living as a street orphan, she joins a gang led by a slightly older orphan, Rooster Charlie. After Charlie is killed, she enlists with the crew of the H.M.S. Dolphin as a ship's boy. Jacky exhibits the characteristics of a "Jack" or "Fox" folk hero: flashing a "foxy" smile, she is charming and sly, good-hearted and adventure seeking, endlessly slipping into and out of trouble, and making sport out of besting her foes.
- Rooster Charlie: He is called Rooster Charlie, both because his last name is Brewster and because of his red hair and how it falls to the side. Though he is not much older than twelve to fourteen years of age himself, he is the leader of a small gang and is killed for a grudge by a sordid adult. He was Jacky's closest friend. When she finds his murdered body, Jacky takes his knife and his clothes and uses them to begin her life as a boy. Aboard ship, she carves the shiv handle into the likeness of a rooster to honor Charlie.
- James 'Jaimy' Emerson Fletcher: A fellow ship's boy on the HMS Dolphin. He comes from a family that is not poor, but not wealthy enough to buy him a commission as a midshipman. His father enlists him as a ship's boy on the Dolphin. After Jacky secretly reveals her gender to him, Jaimy and Jacky pledge themselves to one another using gold rings that are put through their ears.
- Liam Delaney: An Irishman and skilled sailor, he is Jacky's overseer and "sea dad" who gives her tips and rescues her from ill-intentioned men on board. He does not discover her true gender until it is publicly announced.
- Muck: A corpse seller. He took the corpses of Jacky's family away when they died, murders her best friend, Rooster Charlie, and sells that corpse as well.
- Davy, Willy, Benjy and Tink: Jacky and Jaimy's fellow ship's boys, with whom they form a blood brotherhood. By the end of the book, they have been separated by rank, and in one case, by death, but the bond the survivors had sworn on as shipboard novices remains strong.
- Gabriel LeFievre: An infamous French privateer, who is only ever referred to by the crew as a "pirate king" and is wanted for pillaging British colonies and ships.
- Phineas Tilden: An American, who nominally serves as assistant to the ship's doctor but primarily instructs the midshipmen in history, science, and mathematics. Jacky describes him as a man of good intentions, but also overbearing and dismissive of others.
- Bliffil: The senior midshipman, known for his arrogance and delight in tormenting the ship's boys and his fellow officers. Jacky humiliates him by manipulating another midshipman into breaking his nose and later exposes him as a coward and liar to the captain. This results in Bliffil being dismissed from the crew (though later books show that he simply buys a new commission on a different ship.)
- Stephen Locke: Captain of HMS Dolphin. A fair, but intimidating officer concerned largely with winning prize money and glory for himself and his ship. Towards the end of the story, he shows Jacky a measure of respect for her accomplishments by entering her into records as a midshipman.
- Bill Sloat: A hard-drinking sailor who often argues with Liam and is popular among the crew. Jacky stabs him when he tries to rape her, and he subsequently falls off the ship and drowns.

== Reception ==
Bloody Jack was well received by critics, including starred reviews from Booklist and Publishers Weekly.

Publishers Weekly highlighted how "Meyer evokes life in the 18th-century Royal Navy with Dickensian flair", noting that the author "seamlessly weaves into Jacky's first-person account a wealth of historical and nautical detail at a time when pirates terrorized the oceans". Kirkus Reviews also praised how the historical details are "seamlessly knitted into the material".

Kirkus Reviews described the main character as the highlight of the book, referring to Jacky as "an outsized heroine who is equal parts gutsy and vulnerable", as well as "clever and courageous", noting that "Jacky is such a marvelous creation that the other characters feel shadowy in comparison". They also highlighted how the "novel is full of action and derring-do, but the real suspense is generated by maintaining what the heroine calls 'The Deception,' her disguise as a boy".

The audiobook narrated by Katherine Kellgren also received starred reviews from Booklist and Publishers Weekly. Publishers Weekly said Kellgren's narration was "pure magic" as she "creates authentic character voices, switching effortlessly among Mary’s Cockney, the melodic Irish lilt of sailor Liam, the educated American voice of schoolmaster Tilden, the chillingly sinister, leering tone of Jacob Sloat and many other voices without missing a beat". They also called her acting "first-rate". On behalf of Booklist, Pam Spencer Holley similarly highlighted how "Kellgren’s flexible British accent easily captures the seafaring atmosphere and Jacky’s emotions". Holley further noted that "nautical music introducing and concluding the work adds to the mood, as does Kellgren’s impressive singing of a ballad."

== Accolades ==
Bloody Jack is a Junior Library Guild book. Young Adult Library Services Association (YALSA) included it on their lists of the Best Books for Young Adults (2004) and Popular Paperbacks for Young Adults (2012).

The audiobook narrated by Katherine Kellgren was an Odyssey Award honor book. The Association for Library Service to Children included the it on their 2008 list of Notable Children's Recordings, and in 2009, YALSA included it on their list of Selected Audiobooks for Young Adults.

== Release details ==
- 2002, USA, Harcourt Trade Publishers ISBN 0-15-216731-5, Trade Paperback
- 2008, USA, Listen & Live Audio, Inc. ISBN 978-1-59316-094-4, Unabridged Audiobook
