= L.A. Meyer =

American author

- Born: Louis A. Meyer; January 1, 1942; Johnstown, Pennsylvania, U.S.
- Died: July 29, 2014 (aged 72); Ellsworth, Maine, U.S.
- Education: University of Florida (BA); Columbia University; Boston University (MFA)
- Occupation: Author
- Spouse: Annetje Lawrence (m. 1966)
- Children: 2
- Writing career
- Pen name: L.A. Meyer
- Genres: Young adult fiction; children's literature

Louis A. Meyer (January 1, 1942 – July 29, 2014) was a Maine author. Writing under the name L.A. Meyer, he was best known for his young-adult historical series The Jacky Faber Adventures, also known as the Bloody Jack series. He also wrote two children's picture books and was a painter. He and his wife owned an art gallery called Clair de Loon in Bar Harbor.

== Personal life ==
L.A. Meyer was born in Johnstown, Pennsylvania and spent most of his career in Corea, Maine. His father was an officer in the U.S. Army, so he spent much of his childhood moving around with his family. He attended 12 different schools before graduating high school in Fort Myers, Florida. After finishing university at the University of Florida, in Gainesville, Meyer earned a B.A. in English literature.

Later he enlisted in the U.S. Navy for 4 years. While in the Navy, he married his college sweetheart, Annetje Lawrence (in 1966). They had two sons, Matthew and Nathaniel. Like their father, both men are painters and teachers. Annetje was also a teacher before dedicating herself to the family's businesses and researching historical points for her husband's novels.

Since 1984, he and his wife owned an art gallery called Clair de Loon in Bar Harbor, where they sold matted and framed prints of his artwork. Clair de Loon closed in November 2013 due to Meyer's illness.

== Biography ==
Meyer grew up on U.S. Army bases in Germany and the American east coast, attended high school in Pennsylvania and Florida, college in Florida, and then hitchhiked through Mexico and the American Southwest before joining the military.

During the Vietnam War Meyer joined the U.S. Navy, stating in interviews that he joined the Navy to avoid death in a foxhole. He became an officer after four months, and was assigned to the Mediterranean Fleet. He saw no combat during his tour of duty, which included ports of call in Italy, France, Spain, and Malta.

Meyer received a Bachelor of Arts degree in English literature from the University of Florida in 1964. He took graduate art courses at Columbia University in 1970 and received an MFA in Painting in 1973 at Boston University's Master of Fine Arts program. Before graduating from Boston University, Meyer had already written two children's picture books for Little, Brown and Company. He also worked as a floor sweeper, social worker, and high school art teacher.

Meyer died from complications caused by Hodgkin's lymphoma on July 29, 2014, in Ellsworth, Maine.

== Jacky Faber books ==
Meyer invented the idea for the character of Jacky Faber while listening to British and Celtic folk music on a local community radio station in his workshop. Meyer describes the moment on his website:

...the host of the program plays a long string of early nineteenth century songs that feature young girls dressing up as boys and following their boyfriends out to sea, the most well known of these being Jackaroe and Cana-di-i-o. These songs generally end up with the girl being found out quickly and threatened with being thrown overboard, but all ends happily when she either marries the boy or the captain.

It occurred to me, however, to wonder what it would be like if the girl, instead of seeking to be with her lover, connives to get on board a British warship in order to just eat regularly and have a place to stay, her being a starving orphan on the streets of early 1800s London. What would she have to do to pull off this deception for a long period of time? What if she goes through the changes of adolescence while on board in the company of 408 rather rough men and boys, and her not having much of a clue as to what is happening to her? What if this ship goes into combat and she has to do her dangerous duty? And, finally, what if she falls in love with one of the boys and can never tell him of her female nature?

I started making notes and seven months later Bloody Jack was done.

Meyer stated in several fan interviews that the final book in the series would be titled She Will Play the Wild Rover No More, a name adapted from a line in the folk ballad "The Wild Rover", and hinted that the book was already completed and "deep in a vault," though he further stated that he did not know how many more books would be in the series. In August 2013, Meyer announced the publication of the final installment under the slightly altered title Wild Rover No More. The book was published posthumously in November 2014.

== Bibliography ==
- two or more children's books published by Little, Brown prior to 1973
- The Gypsy Bears Illustrated Children's Book (1971)

=== Bloody Jack series ===
1. Bloody Jack: Being an Account of the Curious Adventures of Mary "Jacky" Faber, Ship's Boy (2002)
2. Curse of the Blue Tattoo: Being an Account of the Misadventures of Jacky Faber, Midshipman and Fine Lady (2004)
3. Under the Jolly Roger: Being an Account of the Further Nautical Adventures of Jacky Faber (2005)
4. In the Belly of the Bloodhound: Being an Account of a Particularly Peculiar Adventure in the Life of Jacky Faber (2006)
5. Mississippi Jack: Being an Account of the Further Waterborne Adventures of Jacky Faber, Midshipman, Fine Lady, and the Lily of the West (2007)
6. My Bonny Light Horseman: Being an Account of the Further Adventures of Jacky Faber, in Love and War (2008)
7. Rapture of the Deep: Being an Account of the Further Adventures of Jacky Faber, Soldier, Sailor, Mermaid, Spy (2009)
8. The Wake of the Lorelei Lee: Being an Account of the Adventures of Jacky Faber, on her Way to Botany Bay (2010)
9. The Mark of the Golden Dragon: Being an Account of the Further Adventures of Jacky Faber, Jewel of the East, Vexation of the West, and Pearl of the South China Sea (2011)
10. Viva Jacquelina! Being an Account of the Further Adventures of Jacky Faber Over the Hills and Far Away (2012)
11. Boston Jacky: Being an Account of the Further Adventures of Jacky Faber, Taking Care of Business (2013)
12. Wild Rover No More: Being the Last Recorded Account of the Life and Times of Jacky Faber (2014)
