= Barry Sonnenfeld's unrealized projects =

During his extensive career, American filmmaker Barry Sonnenfeld has worked on several projects which never progressed beyond the pre-production stage under his direction. Some of these projects fell in development hell, were officially canceled, were in development limbo or would see life under a different production team.

== 1990s ==
=== Swordfish ===
On November 19, 1995, Sonnenfeld was developing Swordfish, a film based on David McClintock's nonfiction book, with Zachary Feuer executive producing the movie with Sonnenfeld, Janet Jacobson & Amy Bedek for Touchstone Pictures. but until March 18, 1998, Sonnenfeld was still attached to produce Stephen Schiff’s draft of Swordfish, but didn't finalized the deal to direct, which was made with Dominic Sena directing the 2001 film.

=== Another Man's Poison remake ===
On November 19, 1995, Sonnenfeld was developing a remake of Irving Rapper’s film Another Man's Poison, with Zachary Feuer executive producing the movie with Sonnenfeld, Robert Chartoff & Lynn Hendee for Touchstone Pictures.

=== Mercury Rising fka Simple Simon ===
By December 11, 1996, Sonnenfeld was set to direct the feature film adaptation of Ryne Douglas Pearson's novel Simple Simon, a thriller about an FBI agent on the run protecting an autistic boy, with Larry Konner and Mark Rosenthal writing the screenplay, Nicolas Cage, Bruce Willis, and George Clooney interested in starring, Brian Grazer producing through Imagine Entertainment in collaboration with Joseph M. Singer Entertainment, and Universal Pictures was handling distribution, until Sonnenfeld moved on to Men in Black and Harold Becker directed Willis entitled Mercury Rising.

=== Vespers film ===
By March 9, 1998, Sonnenfeld was going to produce the feature film adaptation of Jeff Rovin's novel Vespers through his Sonnenfeld/Josephson company and Touchstone Pictures handling distribution.

=== Wild About Harry ===
By April 28, 1998, Sonnenfeld was set to produce Wild About Harry, a romance spec script written by clothing designer Isaac Mizrahi, with Barry Josephson producing through Sonnenfeld/Josephson Productions, and Touchstone Pictures was handling distribution.

=== Power and Grace ===
By August 14, 1998, Sonnenfeld was in talks to direct Power and Grace, a biopic about Muhammad Ali starring Will Smith, with Peters Entertainment producing and Columbia Pictures was handling distribution, which eventually was made with Michael Mann directing Smith as Ali under the title Ali.

=== Kill Van Kull ===
By October 5, 1998, Sonnenfeld was set to produce and possibly direct Kill Van Kull, a heist spec script written by Richard Regen, with Barry Josephson producing through Sonnenfeld/Josephson Productions, and Touchstone Pictures was handling distribution.

=== The Big Mocambo ===
By January 4, 1999, Sonnenfeld was set to produce and direct The Big Mocambo, a live-action/animated romantic-comedy script written by Peter Seaman and Jeffrey Price, who will also executive produce the movie with Barry Josephson producing through Sonnenfeld/Josephson Productions, plus Walt Disney Pictures and Warner Bros. will co-finance, co-produce, & co-handle the film's distribution.

=== Harvey remake ===
By April 6, 1999, Sonnenfeld was interested in producing & directing a remake of Harvey, a comedy based on the play by Mary Chase, and Walt Disney Pictures was handling distribution, but lost a bidding war to Miramax.

=== White Noise (2022) ===
By October 4, 1999, Sonnenfeld was attached to direct the feature film adaptation of Don DeLillo’s black comedy novel White Noise, with a writer's search starting, Sonnenfeld and Barry Josephson producing the film through Sonnenfeld/Josephson Productions along with Nina Jacobson, and Walt Disney Pictures was handling distribution, until July 28, 2004, Sonnenfeld was still attached to direct and produce the adaptation, but in collaboration with Cherry Road Films and Scott Rudin after Disney didn't renew the rights. until Michael Almereyda was set to write and direct the film adaptation, & Noah Baumbach ultimately made a film adaptation in 2022.

== 2000s ==
=== The Ugly Truth ===
In the early 2000s, Sonnenfeld was in talks to direct Nicole Eastman's screenplay The Ugly Truth, for Warner Bros., until Robert Luketic replaced Sonnenfeld and The Ugly Truth was released in 2009 by Columbia Pictures.

=== Dummy ===
By June 30, 2000, Sonnenfeld was set to produce Dummy, a road comedy script written by Marc Hyam. Bonnie and Terry Turner were also planned to produce the movie with Barry Josephson producing through Sonnenfeld/Josephson Productions, and Walt Disney Pictures was planned to finance, produce, and handle the film's distribution.

=== The Killer ===
By June 30, 2000, Sonnenfeld was set to produce The Killer, with Phil Tag rewriting John Hamburg's screenplay, Tim Allen was set to star, Barry Josephson producing through Sonnenfeld/Josephson Productions, and Walt Disney Pictures financing, producing, and handling the film's distribution.

=== The Foolish Club ===
By June 30, 2000, Sonnenfeld was set to produce The Foolish Club, with Jim Miller writing the screenplay about the start of Lamar Hunt's football career, Barry Josephson producing through Sonnenfeld/Josephson Productions, and Walt Disney Pictures will finance, produce, & handle the film's distribution.

=== The Tin Man ===
By June 30, 2000, Sonnenfeld was set to produce The Tin Man, with Anthony Bagarozzi writing the Los Angeles noir thriller screenplay, John Frankenheimer was set to direct, Shane Black was set to executive produce the movie alongside Barry Josephson through Sonnenfeld/Josephson Productions, and Walt Disney Pictures will finance, produce, & handle the film's distribution.

=== Whispers and Bedlam ===
By June 30, 2000, Sonnenfeld was set to produce Whispers and Bedlam, with Gerald Di Pego writing the screenplay, Barry Josephson producing through Sonnenfeld/Josephson Productions in collaboration with Brillstein-Grey and Howard Rosenman, and Walt Disney Pictures will finance, produce, & handle the film's distribution.

=== Twisted ===
By November 14, 2000, Sonnenfeld was set to produce Richard Regen's heist script Twisted, with George Armitage set to direct, Barry Josephson producing through Sonnenfeld/Josephson Productions in collaboration with Tom Jacobson & Jim Weda's Miracle Entertainment.

=== Moist feature film ===
By August 21, 2001, Sonnenfeld was set to direct the feature film adaptation of Mark Haskell Smith’s dark comedy novel Moist, with Smith writing the screenplay, Sonnenfeld producing with Dan Jinks & Bruce Cohen, and DreamWorks Pictures handling film distribution.

=== Lemony Snicket's A Series of Unfortunate Events feature film ===
By June 11, 2002, Sonnenfeld was attached to direct the feature film adaptation of Daniel Handler’s A Series of Unfortunate Events children's book series, with Handler writing the screenplay, Scott Rudin producing the film along with Nickelodeon Movies then-president Albie Hecht, and Paramount Pictures was handling distribution, until February 19, 2003, when Brad Silberling replaced Sonnenfeld. Sonnenfeld would executive produce and direct episodes of the television series adaptation for Netflix.

=== Fun With Dick and Jane remake ===
On June 10, 2003, Sonnenfeld was hired to direct the remake of Fun with Dick and Jane, with Peter Tolan and Judd Apatow involved with screenwriting, Jim Carrey cast as Dick, Brian Grazer producing through Imagine Entertainment, and Columbia Pictures handling film distribution, until that October, Dean Parisot replaced Sonnenfeld.

=== The Heartbreak Kid remake ===
On April 20, 2004, Sonnenfeld was offered to direct the remake of The Heartbreak Kid, but turned it down, leading to the Farrelly brothers accepting the offer on May 31, 2005.

=== A New Leaf ===
On April 20, 2004, Sonnenfeld was set to direct the A New Leaf, with Joan Cusack and Kevin Kline set to star for Paramount Pictures.

=== Angry White Men ===
On April 20, 2004, Sonnenfeld was set to direct the Angry White Men for Warner Bros.

=== The Know-It-All feature film ===
On September 9, 2004, Sonnenfeld was set to direct and produce the feature film adaptation of A. J. Jacobs’ novel The Know-It-All: One Man’s Humble Quest to Become the Smartest Person in the World, with Jacobs writing the screenplay, with Ted Field producing through Radar Pictures.

=== Hackett TV series ===
On February 22, 2007, Sonnenfeld was set to direct the pilot episode of the comedy series Hackett, with Sony Pictures Television and 25 C Prods. producing the series and FOX set to broadcast the series. with Donal Logue, Christian Hoff, Rachel Boston, and Morgan Murphy cast in the series.

=== The Box ===
On May 11, 2007, Sonnenfeld was in talks to direct The Box, Evan Spiliotopoulos supernatural action-adventure screenplay about finding Pandora's Box in modern day, Richard Lewis producing through Southpaw Entertainment, and 20th Century Fox handling film distribution.

=== Kingdom TV series ===
On July 17, 2007, Sonnenfeld was set to direct the pilot episode of Chad Hodge’s fantasy drama series Kingdom, with Sony Pictures Television producing the series and CBS set to broadcast the series. On April 1, 2008, CBS passed on the series, with Sony Pictures Television still committed to developing the series for another channel with Sonnenfeld directing & executive producing, Hodge executive producing, and Tony Jordan rewriting the series.

=== untitled Lukas Reiter legal thriller TV series ===
On August 7, 2007, Sonnenfeld was set to direct the pilot episode of Lukas Reiter’s legal thriller series, with Universal Media Studios producing the hour-long series and NBC set to broadcast the series, with Alan Tudyk, Andrew Lincoln, Kurtwood Smith and Frankie Faison cast in the series.

=== American Suburban Shootout TV series adaptation ===
In March 2008, Sonnenfeld was set to direct the pilot episode of the American adaptation of the British comedy series Suburban Shootout, with Michelle Ashford writing the series, and Sonnenfeld producing the series through Right Coast Film Co. in collaboration with Laurence Bowen and Philip Clarke's Feelgood Fiction & Ashford's Round Two Productions, and HBO set to broadcast the series.

=== Things a Man Should Never Do Past 30 TV series ===
On June 25, 2008, Sonnenfeld was set to direct the television series adaptation of David Katz's novel Things a Man Should Never Do Past 30, with Katz and Esquire editor at large A.J. Jacobs writing the series, and Jay Scherick and David Ronn attached as supervising producers, and in November that same year, CBS was involved with the series development with Al Higgins' set to be the showrunner of the series, and Sonnenfeld producing with the Tannenbaum Company and Sony Pictures Television.

=== Jeff Rake's supernatural legal drama TV series ===
On June 25, 2008, Sonnenfeld was set to direct Jeff Rake's supernatural legal drama TV series, with Sony Pictures Television producing with Sonnenfeld.

=== Bronwyn and Clyde ===
In October 2008, Sonnenfeld was in talks and/or set to direct Tom Vaughan and Kristy Dobkin's romantic crime-comedy screenplay “Bronwyn and Clyde,” with Jim Kohlberg, Neil Kaplan, Chris Uettwiller and Dolly Hall producing the film through Essential Pictures.

=== Funny in Farsi TV series ===
On November 30, 2008, Sonnenfeld was set to executive produce the television series adaptation of Firoozeh Dumas’ memoir Funny in Farsi, as well as direct the pilot episode, with Jeffrey Hoades and Nastaran Dibai writing the series and ABC set to broadcast the series.

=== The How-To Guide for Saving the World ===
By December 17, 2008, Sonnenfeld was set to direct and produce “The How-To Guide for Saving the World,” BenDavid Grabinski's sci-fi action comedy, with Metro-Goldwyn-Mayer handling film distribution, which Grabinski revealed that Tom Cruise wanted to play a side character in the movie, until MGM filed for bankruptcy in 2010 led to the movie's cancelation.

=== American Scandal Makers remake ===
By March 2, 2009, Sonnenfeld was set to direct and produce the American remake of Kang Hyung-chul’s directorial debut film Scandal Makers, with June Lee producing through Moho Film.

=== The Spellman Files film ===
By April 1, 2009, Sonnenfeld was set to direct a feature film adaptation of Lisa Lutz’s novel The Spellman Files, with Bobby Florsheim and Josh Stolberg co-writing a screenplay, Laura Ziskin producing and Paramount Pictures handling film distribution. But on October 18, 2010, the film talks failed and a television series was being developed for ABC without Sonnenfeld's involvement.

=== Dan Mintner: Badass for Hire ===
By April 1, 2009, Sonnenfeld was in talks to direct the action comedy film Dan Mintner: Badass for Hire, written by Chad Kultgen, Contrafilm's Beau Flynn, Mason Novick, and Tripp Vinson are producing for New Line Cinema to distribute, but on July 20, 2009, Phil Claydon was set to direct the movie instead of Sonnenfeld.

=== Tom Shift film ===
By May 31, 2009, Sonnenfeld was set to direct and produce a feature film adaptation of Edward Stratemeyer’s Tom Swift book series, with BenDavid Grabinski and Sonnenfeld co-writing a screenplay, with Columbia Pictures handling film distribution.

=== Gil's All Fright Diner animated feature film ===
By December 16, 2009, Sonnenfeld was set to direct a feature film adaptation of A. Lee Martinez’s novel Gil's All Fright Diner, with Ethan Reiff and Cyrus Voris co-writing a screenplay, DreamWorks Animation producing and Paramount Pictures handling film distribution. In 2011, the book's author A. Lee Martinez was working with DreamWorks on a project based on an original idea, and not on Gil's All Fright Diner, leading to uncertainty for any film adaptation: "Your guess is as good as mine. It's all a matter of convincing someone with the clout necessary to make it happen".

== 2010s ==
=== Pig Scrolls animated feature film ===
By April 2010, Sonnenfeld was in talks to direct the animated comedy film adaptation of Paul Shipton’s The Pig Scrolls book series, with Kirk DeMicco writing the most recent script revision for DreamWorks Animation.

=== Beat the Devil TV series ===
On May 2, 2010, Sonnenfeld was attached to produce a supernatural horror series Beat the Devil, in collaboration with Fluent Media Group and Resonant TV, which will be pitched to U.S. broadcasters and search for a showrunner.

=== Metal Men film ===
By June 5, 2012, Sonnenfeld was attached to direct the feature film adaptation of the superhero team Metal Men, with Warner Bros. handling film distribution, and on October 12, 2021, Sonnenfeld confirmed that the film was in development and is a part of the DCEU, and is separate from John Musker and Ron Clements’ animated film project.

=== Lore feature film ===
By September 25, 2012, Sonnenfeld was in talks to direct the feature film adaptation of Ashley Wood’s graphic novel “Lore,” with Cory Goodman and Jeremy Lott writing the screenplay, Dwayne Johnson attached to star, Wood producing the film with Andrew Lazar & Miri Yoon through Mad Chance, David Alpert and Rick Jacobs through Circle of Confusion, & Ted Adams through IDW Publishing, and Warner Bros. handling film distribution, but on August 28, 2013, Dave Green replaced Sonnenfeld as director, but Sonnenfeld will stay on as an executive producer.

=== Project Alpha ===
By March 12, 2015, Sonnenfeld was set to direct “Project Alpha,” the biopic of James Randi, with Justin Weinstein and Tyler Measom executive producing the feature film based on their documentary An Honest Liar.

=== Swamplandia! TV series ===
On April 7, 2015, Sonnenfeld was attached to executive produce the television series adaptation of Karen Russell's novel Swamplandia!, with Sonnenfeld directing the pilot episode, Liz Tigelaar writing and producing the television series through Best Day Ever company in collaboration with Warner Horizon Television, and USA Network would broadcast the series.

== 2020s ==
=== Perestroika in Paris animated feature film ===
On April 12, 2021, Sonnenfeld was set to direct the 2D animated film adaptation of Jane Smiley’s book Perestroika in Paris, with Frank Marshall producing.
