= List of unproduced DreamWorks Animation projects =

The following is a list of unmade and unreleased animated projects by DreamWorks Animation. Some of these films or shows were, or still are, in development limbo. These also include the co-productions the studio collaborated with in the past (i.e. DreamWorks Animation Television, Oriental DreamWorks, Aardman Animations, Columbus 81 Productions, Bullwinkle Studios, World Events Productions, Double Dare You Productions, Scholastic Corporation, Harvey Entertainment, and Amblin Entertainment), as well as sequels to their franchises and one-off films.

== 1990s ==
=== 1991 ===
Type	Title	Description
Feature film	Bugs: Lights Out	Before Disney and Pixar's Toy Story was released and DreamWorks was incorporated, the animation studio Pacific Data Images (PDI) pitched several computer-animated film projects throughout 1991. One of the pitches was a film called Bugs: Lights Out about microscopic insect-like robots who were responsible for the entropy of electronics and machinery. Despite a completed script, character designs, and test animations, the project was shelved when PDI was selected by DreamWorks to instead produce Antz.

=== 1996 ===
Type	Title	Description
Feature film	InterWorld	The idea of InterWorld surged in 1996, when Michael Raeves was developing an animated series for DreamWorks. Suggesting to Gaiman an idea for a possible animated television series, they collaborated on the story and unsuccessfully tried to sell it to various studios, including DreamWorks, which was not interested. The InterWorld idea ended up as a novel that was not released until 2007. In June of that same year, author Neil Gaiman reported in his journal that he had pitched the idea of InterWorld to DreamWorks back in 1996, but the executives were confused on the concept. Along with Michael Raeves, they later published their work into the novel, in which DreamWorks Animation had optioned into producing an animated film. Nothing came of it until June 2016, when the plans to make InterWorld as television series were revived by Universal Cable Productions, in association with Hamilton producer Jeffrey Seller and his partner Flody Suarez. Nothing came of it since then.

=== 1998 ===
Series / type	Title	Description
Antz	Untitled Antz sequel	A direct-to-video sequel to Antz was in development at DreamWorks at the time of its release. Like the first film, it was planned to be produced by Pacific Data Images (PDI). By early 1999, when DreamWorks closed its television animation unit and merged the direct-to-video unit with the feature animation, the sequel was still planned, but eventually the project was cancelled.
Feature film	Rockumentary	In 1998, DreamWorks and PDI started development on a parody of The Beatles film A Hard Day's Night, about a Beatles-esque penguin rock band. The idea was shelved when they could not secure the music rights. When Madagascar went into production, director Eric Darnell decided to revive the penguins and make them a commando/spy unit instead of a rock band.
Feature film	Tusker	In December 1998, DreamWorks and PDI announced their third computer-animated project titled Tusker, which was meant to follow Shrek. It would have been an original story chronicling a herd of elephants crossing southeast Asia. In their travels, they encounter a wide variety of dangers, including a band of marauding poachers. Tim Johnson and Brad Lewis, the co-director and producer of Antz respectively, were slated to direct and produce the project, and Morgan Freeman, Jodie Foster, Garry Shandling, Dana Carvey, Bruno Kirby and Don Knotts were part of the cast.
Goosebumps	—N/a	Back in 1998, Tim Burton was attached to produce a film adaptation of the Goosebumps children's horror books by R.L. Stine, and it was going to be a co-production with 20th Century Fox. However, it was later scrapped because there was no script they liked nor a determined book or monster to adapt. It would take until 2015 for Goosebumps to be adapted into a feature film, when Columbia Pictures and Sony Pictures Animation released their own adaptation directed by Rob Letterman, along with a sequel in 2018, both of which starred Jack Black in the main role.
Jurassic Park	Chaos Effect	An animated series based on the 1997 film The Lost World: Jurassic Park was commissioned by Steven Spielberg, and was to be developed by DreamWorks under the supervision of Steve Lyons. The series would have been released after the film with the same name and would have involved hybrid dinosaurs similar to Jurassic World, but was eventually shelved due to a variety of internal conflicts.
Feature film	The Wanderer	Intended to be directed by Brizzi Brothers and Simon Wells, the story centered on a stray bear who joins a group of circus bears and changes their lives. The cast would have included Ellen Greene, Brian Stokes Mitchell, Jon Cryer, Amy Yasbeck, Joey Fatone, Dick Van Dyke, and James Gandolfini. The project was cancelled when Wells decided to direct the 2002 film The Time Machine.

=== 1999 ===
Type	Title	Description
Feature film	Tortoise vs. Hare	By October 1999, Aardman was developing a film adaptation of the Aesop fable, The Tortoise and the Hare, with DreamWorks. In July 2001, they postponed production on the film as they continued to rework the script. Bob Hoskins, Orlando Jones, Brenda Blethyn, Alice Cooper and Lee Evans were set to voice the characters. Karey Kirkpatrick and Mark Burton were writing the script, though more writers were expected to be brought on to revamp the script. Peter Lord and Nick Park were slated to be executive producers while Richard Goleszowski was attached as director.

== 2000s ==
=== 2000 ===
Series	Title	Description
Sonic the Hedgehog	Untitled Knuckles the Echidna film	On Twitter, comic book writer Ken Penders claimed that he was approached by DreamWorks to write a film starring the character from the Sonic the Hedgehog universe, Knuckles the Echidna.

=== 2001 ===
Type	Title	Description
Feature film	Moby Dick	In December 2001, the Brizzi Brothers pitched an animated feature adaptation of Moby Dick to DreamWorks. It was expected to move forward into production following Sinbad: Legend of the Seven Seas for a potential 2004 release date. The Brizzi Brothers left DreamWorks and placed their project into turnaround at Sony Pictures Animation in 2003.
Feature film	Truckers	A film based on The Nome Trilogy books was in the works from 2001 to 2011. DreamWorks acquired the film rights in 2001, and announced plans to combine all three books into a single film. It was to be directed by Andrew Adamson. In late 2008, Danny Boyle was attached to direct Truckers, but the project fell apart due to his financial problems. The following year, the Slumdog Millionaire's Oscar-winning screenwriter Simon Beaufoy was hired to work on the project. Plans to move forward with DreamWorks' adaptation resurfaced in 2010 with the announcement that Legend of the Guardians screenwriter John Orloff would pen the script for director Anand Tucker. Tucker was later announced to direct another DreamWorks film Trolls, which was planned to be partially based on a Pratchett novel, before he was replaced by Mike Mitchell.

=== 2002 ===
Series / type	Title	Description
VeggieTales	The Bob and Larry Movie	The origin story of VeggieTales hosts Bob the Tomato and Larry the Cucumber reveals how they met, how they got their own show, and answers the question how vegetables and fruit talk. This was the first film in the series to feature humans. According to Phil Vischer, Jonah: A VeggieTales Movie was their The Ten Commandments, while The Bob and Larry Movie was to be their Toy Story. The Bob and Larry Movie was originally planned to be the second VeggieTales movie with a released date in late 2005. It was placed into production in early 2002, toward the end of production of Jonah: A VeggieTales Movie. However, Big Idea Productions fell into bankruptcy in late 2002 and the film was placed on hold, as it was deemed too expensive. Vischer then wrote The Pirates Who Don't Do Anything: A VeggieTales Movie as a replacement. In 2008, it was considered to be the sequel to The Pirates who Don't Do Anything: A VeggieTales Movie, but talks stalled after the bankruptcy of VeggieTales owners Entertainment Rights and Classic Media. A decade later, Vischer said that The Bob and Larry script exists, but does not want it released because VeggieTales is now owned by Universal and DreamWorks.
Gorillaz	Celebrity Harvest	After the release of the debut album Gorillaz, Jamie Hewlett announced a film adaptation of the fictional band titled Celebrity Harvest. The film was further teased in the 2003 album Think Tank, which had the words "Celebrity Harvest" printed on a corner of the booklet. The film was described as a "very dark film" with "cannibals and zombies". The script stated that it revolves around the theme of the world being trapped in an endless night and the sickness of celebrity culture. The project was canceled as DreamWorks thought it was too dark.

=== 2004 ===
Type	Title	Description
Feature film	The White Seal	An adaptation of The White Seal, one of the stories featured in The Jungle Book by Rudyard Kipling. Composer Eric Whitacre recounted being contacted by DreamWorks to write music for the project after the presentation of Paradise Lost: Shadows and Wings at the ASCAP Musical Theater Workshop in spring 2004. He then submitted a musical rendition of "The Seal Lullaby", a poem featured in the story, only to find weeks later that the film had been canceled in favor of Kung Fu Panda. Whitacre would later serve as the conductor for vocal arrangements for the soundtrack of Kung Fu Panda 3.

=== 2005 ===
Type	Title	Description
Feature film	Route 66	In September 2005, DreamWorks announced an original film, with Mulligan, a giant golf ball statue standing on a side of Route 66 who goes on a journey to save a giant blueberry statue named Betty when she gets taken away. The concept came from comedian Harland Williams, alongside Conrad Vernon and Rej Bourdages. Williams and Vernon were slated to pen the screenplay. In 2009, Williams revealed in an email inquiry that the film had been shelved.
Feature film	It Came From Earth!	In September 2005, DreamWorks announced they were developing an original film with Sheira & Loli's Dittydoodle Works creator Cory Rosenberg. The film would have been an alien invasion spoof revolving around a planet of Martians who are visited by human astronauts. Josh Lobis and Darin Moiselle were attached to write the script.

=== 2006 ===
Type	Title	Description
Feature film	Punk Farm	In April 2006, DreamWorks Animation had the rights to develop a computer-animated film adaptation of the children's book of the same name by Jarrett J. Krosoczka. In June 2011, the project was eventually picked up by Metro-Goldwyn-Mayer, but with no further news since.

=== 2007 ===
Series	Title	Description
Feature film	Gullible's Travels	In January 2007, DreamWorks bought a spec script titled Gullible's Travels which would have been about a man who travels through time via a porta potty to find the woman he loves. Steve Bencich and Ron J. Friedman were slated to write and produce the project.
Feature film	The Book of Life	DreamWorks initially optioned to make The Book of Life back in 2007, but it was cancelled due to "creative differences" with director Jorge Gutierrez. The film was eventually made at 20th Century Fox Animation and Reel FX Creative Studios and was released by 20th Century Fox (which also had a distribution deal with DreamWorks Animation at that time) in 2014 to critical praise. It was nominated for a Golden Globe for Best Animated Feature.

=== 2008 ===
Type	Title	Description
Feature film	Alcatraz Versus the Evil Librarians	DreamWorks Animation acquired the film rights to Alcatraz Versus the Evil Librarians in June 2008. By January 2011, Brandon Sanderson, the author of the novel, revealed that DreamWorks did not renew the rights.

=== 2009 ===
Series	Title	Description
Feature film	B.O.O.: Bureau of Otherworldly Operations	On May 28, 2009, DreamWorks first announced plans for "Super Secret Ghost Project". Later in mid-June 2009, it was reported that DreamWorks is developing the project under a working title as Boo U., Tony Leondis has been set to direct and Jon Vitti to pen the screenplay for the film, set to be released in the end of 2012. The story would follow a ghost who is bad at his job and must return to ghost school. Seth Rogen was reported in August 2010 to have joined the film as the voice of the lead character. In September 2012, DreamWorks announced an animated film about ghosts that would have starred Rogen, Matt Bomer, Melissa McCarthy, Bill Murray, Octavia Spencer, Rashida Jones, and Jennifer Coolidge, reported under a different title known as B.O.O.: Bureau of Otherworldly Operations. Tom Wheeler would have rewritten Vitti's script from a story by Leondis. It was about two bumbling apparitions who find themselves in an extraordinary after-life adventure when they join the Bureau of Otherworldly Operations (B.O.O.) – the ghost world's elite counter-haunting unit – and ultimately must face off against the planet's greatest haunter. The film was scheduled to be released on June 5, 2015, but it was pulled to avoid competition with Pixar's Inside Out. For the fourth quarter of 2014, the studio reported a $155 million write-off, primarily related to unreleased films, including B.O.O. and Monkeys of Mumbai.
Feature film	Dinotrux	In March 2009, studio had rights to the children's book Dinotrux, originally planned as a computer-animated film. It was not until 2015 when the studio produced an animated series based on the books for Netflix. The series ended up lasting for eight seasons from 2015 to 2018.
Feature film	The Bones Family / Sugar Bones	In 2009, Mexican actress and film producer Salma Hayek and filmmakers Rodolfo and Gabriel Riva Palacio Alatriste, founders of animation studio Huevocartoon, approached DreamWorks to sell a feature film entitled The Bones Family (later retitled Sugar Bones), about the Mexican holiday Day of the Dead. The story would follow a boy who, in the company of a xoloitzcuintle, goes through a portal to the Land of the Dead to find his deceased dysfunctional family, who died in a road accident among a travel to Las Vegas. Gradually, the boy takes the form of a sugar skull, indicating that if he does not return to the living world before a certain time, he and his family will remain forever in the underworld. When the Riva Palacio brothers were making Otra película de huevos y un pollo (2009), a direct follow up to Una película de huevos (2006) and the second installment in the Huevos film series, they received a call from Hayek, who wanted to work with them on an animation project. Originally, the film was planned as a production of Ventana Azul —Salma Hayek's production company in association with José Tamez, subsidiary of Metro-Goldwyn-Mayer— with Huevocartoon as its main animation studio, the comedian George Lopez joined as co-writer, producer and part of the voice cast as main character.
Feature film	Gil's All Fright Diner	By December 2009, the studio had set screenwriters Ethan Reiff and Cyrus Voris (Kung Fu Panda) to write a film adaptation of the book, Gil's All Fright Diner, with Barry Sonnenfeld attached to direct the feature. In 2011, the book's author A. Lee Martinez was working with DreamWorks on a project based on an original idea, and not on Gil's All Fright Diner. In March 2013, Martinez expressed uncertainty for any film adaptation: "Your guess is as good as mine. It's all a matter of convincing someone with the clout necessary to make it happen".

== 2010s ==
=== 2010 ===
Series / type	Title	Description
Feature film	Alma	By October 2010, a film adaptation of the animated short Alma was in development with the short's director Rodrigo Blaas slated to direct and Guillermo del Toro was to serve as executive producer. The studio later hired Megan Holley, a writer of Sunshine Cleaning, to write a script. Del Toro, who was also helping with the story and the design work, said in June 2012 that the film was in visual development.
Feature film	Imaginary Enemies	In August 2010, DreamWorks Animation announced their first live-action animated project. The project was to be told from the point of view of the imaginary friends who had long been used as scapegoats by unscrupulous children looking for someone else to blame for their misdeeds. Eventually fed up, the imaginary people would come looking for revenge when the kids are grown up. Screenwriters Joe Syracuse and Lisa Addario were attached to write the script.
Feature film	Maintenance	In December 2010, DreamWorks bought the film rights to the comic book series Maintenance from Oni Press. The film rights were first acquired by Warner Bros. as a potential project for director McG, but DreamWorks then got rights after Warner Bros. dropped out.
Feature film	Me and My Shadow / Edgar Wright's Shadows	In December 2010, DreamWorks Animation announced a project titled Me and My Shadow, scheduled for a March 2013 release date. The plot involved Shadow Stan who serves as a shadow to Stanley Grubb, the world's most boring human. Wanting to live a more exciting life, he escapes the "Shadow World" and takes control of Stanley. Intended to be directed by Mark Dindal, who also developed the film's concept and story, the film would have combined 2D and CGI animation. In January 2012, Bill Hader, Kate Hudson, and Josh Gad had joined the voice cast. Additionally, Alessandro Carloni replaced Dindal as director and the release date was pushed back to November 2013. Its release date was again pushed back to March 14, 2014, with Mr. Peabody & Sherman taking its November 2013 release. By February 2013, Me and My Shadow went back into development with Mr. Peabody & Sherman re-assuming its original March 2014 release. According to animator Matt Williames, in 2012, Jeffrey Katzenberg fell asleep during a press screening of Me and My Shadow. The crew working on the film knew "he wasn't in to [sic] it". After the screening, Katzenberg said it was not a $200 million film, which is what he "needed". In 2015, Edgar Wright signed to direct and co-write an animated feature for DreamWorks, in which the story was described as a "new take on a previously developed concept about shadows". In an interview with Collider published in June 2017, Wright explained that he and David Walliams had written three drafts, but the project is in limbo due to management changes at DreamWorks Animation.
Feature film	The Pig Scrolls	By April 2010, the studio was developing an animated feature film based on The Pig Scrolls. As a possible directing job, Barry Sonnenfeld was tasked to develop the film, while Kirk DeMicco wrote the most recent script revision.
Plants vs. Zombies	—N/a	In 2010, a film based on the Plants vs. Zombies video games was pitched to DreamWorks by artist and character co-creator Rich Werner. Peter Zaslav had provided "a full script reading and a room full of concept art," with Werner listing out what the intended plot of the film had been in an interview in May 2022.
Feature film	Vivo	In 2010, DreamWorks Animation began production on Vivo, an animated musical film which was based on an idea by Lin-Manuel Miranda and a concept by Peter Barsocchini. The film was to have centered on a kinkajou obsessed with music and adventure who embarks on a treacherous journey from Havana, Cuba, to Miami, Florida in pursuit of his dreams to fulfil his destiny. Vivo was eventually cancelled by DreamWorks Animation due to a restructuring. In 2016, the film was later revived and eventually fast-tracked by Sony Pictures Animation with Kirk DeMicco as the director. The film was released on August 6, 2021, on Netflix, after several delays due to the COVID-19 pandemic.

=== 2011 ===
Type	Title	Description
Feature film	Flawed Dogs	By February 2011, DreamWorks optioned the rights of Berkeley Breathed's book Flawed Dogs. By September 2013, it was revealed that Noah Baumbach had been secretly writing and directing the project.
Feature film	The Grimm Legacy	In June 2011, DreamWorks announced an animated film adaption of a book of the same name with producer Robin Schorr attached. However, the project went nowhere and it was not until February 2019 when it went into turnaround as a live-action film for Disney+ instead with David Gleeson to write the screenplay, but nothing came of it since either.
Feature film	Lidsville	In January 2011, a computer-animated musical film adaptation of the Lidsville TV series was announced to be in development with Conrad Vernon slated to direct while Alan Menken was to compose the songs with Glenn Slater. Menken said that the songs were to be a homage to 1960s psychedelic concept-album rock, but in June 2016, Lidsville creator Sid Krofft told to The Wall Street Journal that it was going to be like Hair or Tommy, a full-blown musical, but they went in a "strange" direction and it did not work.
Feature film	Monkeys of Mumbai	By January 2011, DreamWorks was fast-tracking a Bollywood-styled musical adaptation of The Ramayana, but told through the point of view of its monkeys. It would have follow two common monkeys who become unlikely heroes in a last ditch effort to stop an ancient, thought-to-be-mythical demon from conquering the world. Gurinder Chadha and Paul Mayeda Berges were set to write the film, while Stephen Schwartz and A. R. Rahman were attached to compose the songs and score. The project underwent a series of working titles: Monkeys of Bollywood, Monkeys of Mumbai, Mumbai Musical, and Bollywood Superstar Monkey. That June, Kevin Lima signed on to direct the project. Aaron Taylor-Johnson, Kal Penn, Lea Michele and Rohan Chand were in talks to join the cast in 2014. The film was originally scheduled to be released on December 18, 2015, but its release date was pushed back to March 18, 2016, and March 10, 2017. In December 2017, Lima revealed that DreamWorks quietly cancelled the film in an interview with Den of Geeks UK: It came very close. We were just going into production, we were just starting animation. I'd been working on it for two and a half years. All the songs were written. Stephen Schwartz and A.R. Rahman. We were just ready to start. I have to say that it's one of the great disappointments of my film career not seeing that one move forward. It had nothing to do with the movie, and everything to do with the politics of selling the studio. Seven of us I think lost movies at that moment in time. With the studio having written it off on their taxes, it means the only way to get it back would be to invest that kind of money again. And it's tens of millions of dollars. I tried. I really tried. Stephen Schwartz and I took it around town, but when the price tag was revealed, everyone gasped. Ultimately, we couldn't find a buyer.
Feature film	Rumblewick	In March 2011, DreamWorks announced an animated adaptation of the book My Unwilling Witch (The Rumblewick Letters) and was to be titled Rumblewick. Tim Johnson and Jim Herzfeld were slated to write and direct the project. In 2016, Brenda Chapman stated she had worked on the project.

=== 2012 ===
Series / type	Title	Description
Feature film	Giants: Forces of Nature	In 2012, DreamWorks filed a trademark for an unannounced film titled Giants: Forces of Nature. Peter Zaslav, an art director and visual development artist, posted concept art for the film (albeit password-protected).
Madagascar	Madagascar 4	Then-DreamWorks Animation CEO Jeffrey Katzenberg stated in December 2010 that there was likely to be a fourth installment in the Madagascar franchise, in which would have been set in New York. In June 2012, DreamWorks Animation's head of worldwide marketing, Anne Globe, said that it was too early to talk about the project. A month later, Eric Darnell, who co-directed all three films, spoke of the possibility of the fourth film, saying that if the audience wants a new film, then Eric and his crew would have an idea that is different from the previous films. The film was scheduled to be released on May 18, 2018, but was removed from the release schedule following a corporate restructuring and DreamWorks Animation's new policy to release two films a year. In April 2017, Tom McGrath said that the project was in the works, but nothing officially was announced. In January 2026, McGrath stated that DreamWorks still wanted to make a fourth Madagascar film as soon as they find a suitable story.
Rise of the Guardians	—N/a	Following the release of Rise of the Guardians, the creators expressed hope that the strong A− Cinemascore average for the film and an enthusiastic word-of-mouth would gather support for the "chance to make a sequel or two". William Joyce, the film's co-producer and author of the book The Guardians of Childhood, stated he was in talks with the studio to make a sequel.

=== 2013 ===
Type	Title	Description
Casper the Friendly Ghost	Untitled CGI Casper film	In 2013, DreamWorks Animation announced that they were developing a computer-animated reboot film based on the Harvey Comics character of the same name. Simon Wells, who at one point was previously attached to write and direct the unproduced sequel to the 1995 live-action film, was attached to write and direct this adaptation, with writing duo John Altschuler and Dave Krinsky (King of the Hill, Blades of Glory) to co-write the film's script along with. It was set to be DreamWorks' second attempt at an animated film based on characters from the Classic Media library following Mr. Peabody & Sherman, but nothing came of it since its announcement. Concept art for an unproduced film was posted by animator Danny Williams in December 2023, stating that the pitch "never went anywhere".
Feature film	Larrikins	By June 2013, Tim Minchin was attached to compose the songs and score for Larrikins, which was based on an original concept by Harry Cripps. The project was about a desert-dwelling bilby named Perry who leaves his home under a rock to go on a road trip with a music band in Australia. Three years later, Minchin and Chris Miller were attached to direct the film while Margot Robbie, Hugh Jackman, Naomi Watts, Rose Byrne, Ben Mendelsohn, Jacki Weaver, Josh Lawson, Damon Herriman, and Ewen Leslie were to voice characters for the film. The film was slated to be released on February 16, 2018. In 2017, Minchin announced on his personal blog that the project had been cancelled. Minchin wrote on his blog: I've recently been working in 3 different continents, missing my kids a lot, sleeping too little and not playing piano enough. And then a couple of days ago, the animated film to which I've dedicated the last 4 years of my life was shut down by the new studio execs. The only way I know how to deal with my impotent fury and sadness is to subject members of the public to the spectacle of me getting drunk and playing ballads. Shortly after the film's cancellation, Peter de Sève revealed some concept art for the film via Twitter. Certain characters from the cancelled project later appeared in the 2018 animated short film Bilby. Minchin spoke more about the film's cancellation on Richard Herring's Leicester Square Theatre Podcast in March 2020, saying how the film was 75 percent completed with 110 people working on the film, with the songs completed. Hans Zimmer was also composing the score. After DreamWorks was bought by Universal Pictures in 2016, the film was cancelled and written off for the acquisition expenses, at the expense of DreamWorks. Illumination's Chris Meledandri was also consulted by Universal executives before the cancellation. He also explained how he tried to shop it to other studios, with Netflix and Animal Logic wanting to buy it, but the film's price tag was exorbitant, making it non-viable for other studios to acquire it. Overall, the film cost $90 million.
Feature film	The Tibet Code	When DreamWorks Animation announced its then-newest division called Oriental DreamWorks in China, a film adaptation of The Tibet Code was in development. Its production was shut down due to problems at Oriental DreamWorks and the company could not come to terms with the producer who owned the rights to the book.
Feature film	—N/a	In September 2013, DreamWorks announced an animated film about blue-footed booby birds. Writer-director Karey Kirkpatrick was slated to direct and co-write alongside his writing partner Chris Poche. The project was to be about a dim-witted blue-footed booby who learns that it "isn't the size of your brain, but the size of your heart that counts".

=== 2014 ===
Type	Title	Description
Hot Stuff the Little Devil	—N/a	In April 2014, DreamWorks Animation was developing a live-action animated film based on the Harvey Comics character of the same name, with Lizzie and Wendy Molyneux (Bob's Burgers) set to write the film's script.
Feature film	Hitpig!	In November 2014, Berkeley Breathed announced another film for DreamWorks Animation titled Hitpig. The film would have been a loose adaptation of his 2008 children's book Pete & Pickles, set within a cyberpunk world, with Pete the pig being reimagined into a futuristic bounty hunter. The film was quietly shelved, but in October 2020, British companies Aniventure and Cinesite revived the project, with Dave Rosenbaum and Tyler Werrin as the screenwriters, alongside Breathed and Cinzia Angelini and David Feiss as the directors. The completed film was released on November 1, 2024, by Viva Pictures in the United States.
Feature film	Zodiac	Another animated feature film that was going to be made by Oriental DreamWorks was to be called Zodiac about an anthropomorphic kitty in a modern society with anthropomorphic animals trying to make sure he becomes the first cat on the Chinese zodiac while also discovering a sinister conspiracy, set to be released in 2014. While the film's storyboards were released online, the film's production was canceled due to some problems at Oriental DreamWorks.

=== 2015 ===
Type	Title	Description
Feature film	Beekle	In May 2015, Jason Reitman was attached to write and direct a computer-animated adaptation of the children's book The Adventures of Beekle: The Unimaginary Friend.

=== 2016 ===
Type	Title	Description
Felix the Cat	—N/a	In March 2016, a television series was planned by DreamWorks Animation Television under the DreamWorks Classics banner. WildBrain Studios were originally set to produce the show.

=== 2017 ===
Type	Title	Description
Feature film	Spooky Jack	In 2017, DreamWorks announced an original feature called Spooky Jack, with a planned release date of September 17, 2021. Jason Blum was to serve as executive producer, and it would have been a co-production with Blumhouse Productions. The film would have revolved around three siblings who moved into an eerie new home and discover that all the creatures that they thought do not exist. By October 2019, Spooky Jack was removed from the schedule, with its original release date replaced by The Bad Guys, which was then moved to April 22, 2022.
Feature film	The Wizards of Once	In March 2017, DreamWorks purchased film rights to the book from How to Train Your Dragon author Cressida Cowell to make it into another animated fantasy film series.

=== 2018 ===
Type	Title	Description
Feature film	Mice and Mystics	In October 2018, DreamWorks Animation acquired the rights to the role-playing game for a potential animated film adaptation of the board game of the same name. Alexandre Aja, long-time horror film director, was set to direct and write the film's script along with David Leslie Johnson-McGoldrick. Vertigo Entertainment's Roy Lee and Jon Berg were also set to serve as producers.
Feature film	Sputnik's Guide to Earth	In April 2018, Leo Matsuda sold to DreamWorks a feature film adaptation of Sputnik's Guide to Earth by Frank Cottrell-Boyce, who was also attached to co-write the screenplay. Matsuda was also attached to direct the film.
Feature film	Yokai Samba	In April 2018, Leo Matsuda was hired to write and direct Yokai Samba, which was said to be inspired by a folk story Matsuda had heard while growing up and has Brazilian and Japanese influences. By March 2021, Paramount Animation and Nickelodeon were developing the project.

=== 2019 ===
Series	Title	Description
VeggieTales	Untitled VeggieTales film	In March 2019, just around the same time as the announcement of The VeggieTales Show, series creator Phil Vischer revealed that a new film based on VeggieTales is in development, later said to be centered around a Bible story similar to Jonah: A VeggieTales Movie. In 2020, Vischer submitted a first draft. He was given notes and the go-ahead to revise and write a second draft before the official pitch to studio executives. Vischer completed the final draft of the screenplay and Universal was in talks with a co-production partner for the film. Eventually, Vischer, alongside his wife Lisa, Mike Nawrocki, and Kurt Heinecke, departed from Big Idea Entertainment, thus placing the company in limbo.

== 2020s ==
=== 2020 ===
Series / type	Title	Description
Feature film	Ronan Boyle and the Bridge of Riddles	In September 2020, DreamWorks announced a film adaptation of Tom Lennon's book of the same title was in development, with The Angry Birds Movie director Fergal Reilly slated to direct.

=== 2021 ===
Series / type	Title	Description
Television series	The Gumazing Gum Girl!	In May 2021, voice actress Nancy Cartwright revealed that DreamWorks Animation Television and her production company CRE84U were developing an animated series based on The Gumazing Gum Girl!.
Television series	Mama & Dada	In May 2021, The Tonight Show host Jimmy Fallon announced DreamWorks Animation Television was developing a preschool series titled Mama & Dada under his Electric Hot Dog banner, with Fallon and Kelly Powers as executive producers, and Johanna Stein and Noelle Lara co-developing the series.
Feature film	Untitled Stephen Curry project	In September 2021, National Basketball Association (NBA) athlete Stephen Curry announced a film project for DreamWorks Animation under his Unanimous Media banner. However, in May 2024, the project would eventually make its turnaround to Sony Pictures Animation as his 2026 film Goat.
Television series	Untitled Tony Hale project	In February 2021, Tony Hale announced a television project for DreamWorks Animation Television that was in development.

=== 2022 ===
Type	Title	Description
Casper the Friendly Ghost	Untitled live-action/CGI Casper TV series	In April 2022, DreamWorks would announce (under its TV division) that a live-action animated TV series for Peacock would be in development, with Wu Kai-yu (Hannibal, The Flash, The Ghost Bride) being the showrunner, The series ultimately did not move forward. Instead a new series, inspired by Netflix's Wednesday, was announced for Disney+ in 2026, and set to be executive produced by Steven Spielberg, Rob Letterman, and Hilary Winston.

=== 2023 ===
Series / type	Title	Description
Feature film	Another Me	In 2023, the website Cartoon Brew reported that a Bollywood-themed film project titled Another Me had been shelved due in part to "significant reductions in staffing".

=== 2024 ===
Series / type	Title	Description
VeggieTales	LarryBoy	In January 2024, it was announced that Big Idea and Kingstone Studios were developing a LarryBoy film with a projected 2026 theatrical release. Claire Morrissey, a story artist for DreamWorks Animation, was hired to direct. In June 2026, Phil Vischer revealed that the LarryBoy film project was no longer in development.

=== 2026 ===
Series / type	Title	Description
Shrek	Untitled Lord Farquaad film	Danya Jimenez and Hanna McMechan, two screenwriters of KPop Demon Hunters, at some point developed a film centered around the Shrek antagonist Lord Farquaad.
Madagascar	Untitled The Penguins of Madagascar revival series	At one point, Kade Byrand, who was a visual development artist for Spider-Man: Beyond the Spider-Verse, pitched a revival of the series to DreamWorks Animation Television, but was later rejected.

== See also ==
- List of DreamWorks Animation productions
- List of Illumination productions
- List of Universal Animation Studios productions
- List of Paramount Pictures theatrical animated feature films
- List of 20th Century Studios theatrical animated feature films
- List of Universal Pictures theatrical animated feature films
- List of unproduced Paramount Pictures animated projects
- List of unproduced 20th Century Studios animated projects
- List of unproduced Universal Pictures animated projects
