= Horse Heaven (novel) =

2000 novel by Jane Smiley

- Author: Jane Smiley
- Language: English
- Publisher: Knopf
- Publication date: April 6, 2000
- Publication place: USA
- Pages: 576
- ISBN: 0-375-40600-X

Horse Heaven is a novel by American author Jane Smiley, published in 2000 by Knopf. It was shortlisted for the 2001 Women's Prize for Fiction.

== Background ==
Smiley, a lover of horses since childhood, used the proceeds of her previous novel, A Thousand Acres, to buy a small horse farm in California, which inspired Horse Heaven.

== Summary ==
The plot focuses on various figures involved in horse racing across two seasons. Both humans and horses appear as characters.

== Reception ==
Horse Heaven was well received by critics. Writing for the LA Times, Pam Houston spoke favorably of Smiley's ambitious "narrative balancing act".

The Guardian's Phillip Hensher praised the book's prose and dialogue, stating that Smiley "has started to look like the best living American novelist."

Kirkus Reviews gave a positive view of the novel, commenting Smiley's work-ethic and "gift for transmuting the products of her obviously extensive research into compelling fiction. In a starred review, Publishers Weekly said Horse Heaven was a "highly readable novel".

Booklist reviewed both the novel and audiobook, providing the former a starred review.

== Awards ==
Horse Heaven was shortlisted for the Women's Prize for Fiction in 2001.
