= A Dangerous Business =

2022 novel by Jane Smiley

- Author: Jane Smiley
- Language: English
- Publisher: Alfred A. Knopf
- Publication date: 2022
- Publication place: United States

A Dangerous Business is a 2022 novel by American author Jane Smiley. The novel is a mystery set in California.

== Writing and publication ==
Smiley read about the history of Monterey, California and walked through the city during the period she wrote the novel.

== Reception ==
In a review published by The Guardian, Erica Wagner wrote that the novel was "startlingly flat and unsatisfying". Writing for NPR, Heller McAlpin noted that the novel was inspired by the works of Edgar Allan Poe, and referred to it as "a sort of perfumed 'Poe-Pourri'". McAlpin also noted that the novel was one of several by Smiley with "inspiration in classic fiction". Smiley's novel A Thousand Acres draws from King Lear, and her novel The All-True Travels and Adventures of Lidie Newton draws from The Adventures of Huckleberry Finn.
