= Oriental Dream =

Oriental Dream may refer to:

- Oriental DreamWorks, earlier name of Pearl Studio
- Oriental Dream, a 2015 album by L'Algérino
