= Some Luck =

Book by Jane Smiley

- First edition
- Author: Jane Smiley
- Cover artist: Jacket design by Kelly Blair
- Language: English
- Genre: Novel
- Publisher: Alfred A. Knopf
- Publication date: October 7, 2014
- Publication place: United States
- Media type: Print Hardcover
- Pages: 416 pp (first edition, hardcover)
- ISBN: 978-0307700315 (first edition, hardcover)

Some Luck is a 2014 novel by Jane Smiley. It is the first in a trilogy of novels about an Iowa family over the course of generations. It was longlisted for the 2014 National Book Award.

== Summary ==
Beginning in 1920 on an Iowa farm, with each chapter of the novel covering a single year, the story follows the Langdon family over three decades as children are born, grow up, and go on their own adventures and facing various challenges.

== Reception ==
The reviews have been generally favorable, with the Washington Post concluding that "Smiley delivers a straightforward, old-fashioned tale of rural family life in changing times. Her no-muss, no-fuss storytelling, if unsurprising, is also frequently subtle, wry and moving." The New York Times review said that 'Some Luck' was "...very skillfully conceived, an elegant solution to the historical novelist’s problem of how to raise the big barn that is the past without relying too much on power tools or hired help."
