= The Pig Who Saved the World =

2006 children's book by Paul Shipton

- Author: Paul Shipton
- Language: English
- Genre: Children's
- Publisher: Puffin Books
- Publication date: 6 July 2006
- Publication place: United Kingdom
- Pages: 272 pp
- ISBN: 978-0-14-131635-2
- OCLC: 72867581
- Preceded by: The Pig Scrolls

The Pig Who Saved the World (2006) is the sequel to The Pig Scrolls, both of which were written by Paul Shipton. It is set in ancient Greece and makes references to Greek mythology concerning their gods and heroes.

The main character is Gryllus, a talking pig who has just finished saving the world from utter chaos, when he decides he wants to become human once more. In order to do this, he has to set out to find Circe, the witch who turned him into a pig in the first place, and ask her to change him back. Sibyl, the ex-priestess, and Homer, the soon to be epic poet, come along for the ride.

The Pig Who Saved the World won the Nestlé Bronze Award in 2006.
