= A Thousand Acres (film) =

1997 film by Jocelyn Moorhouse

- Theatrical release poster
- Directed by: Jocelyn Moorhouse
- Screenplay by: Laura Jones
- Based on: A Thousand Acres by Jane Smiley
- Produced by: Marc Abraham; Steve Golin; Lynn Arost; Kate Guinzburg; Sigurjon Sighvatsson
- Starring: Michelle Pfeiffer; Jessica Lange; Jennifer Jason Leigh; Colin Firth; Keith Carradine; Kevin Anderson; Pat Hingle; Jason Robards
- Cinematography: Tak Fujimoto
- Edited by: Maryann Brandon
- Music by: Richard Hartley
- Production companies: Touchstone Pictures; Beacon Pictures; Propaganda Films
- Distributed by: Buena Vista Pictures Distribution (North America); PolyGram Filmed Entertainment (International)
- Release date: September 19, 1997 (US)
- Running time: 105 minutes
- Country: United States
- Language: English
- Budget: $28 million
- Box office: $7.9 million

A Thousand Acres is a 1997 American drama film directed by Jocelyn Moorhouse and starring Michelle Pfeiffer, Jessica Lange, Jennifer Jason Leigh and Jason Robards.

It is an adaptation of the Pulitzer Prize-winning 1991 novel by Jane Smiley, which itself is a reworking of William Shakespeare's King Lear. The character of Larry Cook corresponds to the title character of that play, while the characters of Ginny, Rose, and Caroline represent Lear's daughters Goneril, Regan, and Cordelia. The dramatic catalyst in both works is the division of the father's estate among his three offspring, causing bitter rivalry and ultimately leading to tragedy.

A Thousand Acres was released by Buena Vista Pictures Distribution on September 19, 1997 in the United States, with PolyGram Filmed Entertainment releasing in other territories. The film received negative reviews from critics and was a box office bomb, grossing $7.9 million against a $28 million budget.

== Plot ==
Larry Cook, a prosperous farmer in Iowa, decides to retire and split his acres of land among his three daughters, Ginny, Rose and Caroline. Ginny and Rose happily accept the lucrative agreement to live and work on the farm but Caroline abandons farming for a law career in Des Moines and refuses to take part in the deal.

Larry is consumed with rage and rejects Caroline, leaving Rose and Ginny to go about running the farm with their husbands. However, as Larry loses touch with farming life, he begins to lose touch with reality, and his painful descent into senility leaves him bitterly opposed to his daughters' ways of running the farm.

As she struggles to maintain the farm, Ginny encounters a rift in her relationship with Rose, who reveals that Larry had sexually abused her when she was a child, and insists that he had done the same thing to Ginny. The two women also develop a strong extra-marital attachment to Jess, the handsome son of a neighboring farmer who is loyal to Larry.

Paranoid and disillusioned, Larry decides to sue Rose and Ginny in an effort to regain his patriarchal control, and seeks Caroline's help. The lawsuit divides the family forever, leaving Rose and Ginny to suffer alone while realizing painful truths about their childhood. As Rose and Ginny discover their own individual strengths in the face of adversity, they learn how to survive on their own, without the protection of the farm and the suffocating presence of their father.

== Cast ==
- Michelle Pfeiffer as Rose Cook Lewis
- Jessica Lange as Ginny Cook Smith
- Jason Robards as Larry Cook
- Jennifer Jason Leigh as Caroline Cook
- Colin Firth as Jess Clark
- Keith Carradine as Ty Smith
- Kevin Anderson as Peter Lewis
- Pat Hingle as Harold Clark
- John Carroll Lynch as Ken LaSalle
- Anne Pitoniak as Mary Livingstone
- Vyto Ruginis as Charles Carter
- Michelle Williams as Pammy
- Elisabeth Moss as Linda
- Ray Toler as Marv Carson
- Kenneth Tigar as Doctor
- Steve Key as Loren Clark
- Dan Conway as Henry Dodge
- Stan Cahill as Frank
- Ray Baker as Wallace Crockett
- Beth Grant as Roberta
- Andrea Nittoli as Waitress

== Reception ==
A Thousand Acres holds a rating of 22% on Rotten Tomatoes based on 50 reviews. The website's critical consensus reads "A Thousand Acres makes disappointingly sudsy stuff out of the source material, but benefits from solid performances by a strong cast."

Janet Maslin in The New York Times wrote: "Though Michelle Pfeiffer delivers impressively cold fury as the story's version of Regan (now an embittered breast cancer patient called Rose), and Jessica Lange works hard to breathe life into its Goneril (called Ginny), the film remains stilted and unconvincing... Think obsessive-compulsive Lady Macbeth or Ophelia with an eating disorder, and you have an idea of just how simplistic that seems."

Roger Ebert in The Chicago Sun-Times wrote: "A Thousand Acres is an ungainly, undigested assembly of 'women's issues,' milling about within a half-baked retread of King Lear. The film is so unfocused that at the end of its very long 104 minutes, I was unable to say who I was supposed to like and who I was supposed to hate - although I could name several characters for whom I had no feelings at all... The screenplay is based on a novel by Jane Smiley, unread by me, which won the Pulitzer Prize - which means that either the novel or the prize has been done a great injustice."

Desson Howe wrote in The Washington Post: "That Jane Smiley's A Thousand Acres would become a movie was inevitable. Another virtual certainty was its bowdlerization... Without Smiley’s connecting prose (although we're subjected to long bouts of narration), there’s nothing left but the melodrama... If there are any positives to point to, it would be Lange's performance. Her emotional battle to avoid harsh realities is sure to put her up for those big-time awards. It's too bad she's emoting away in an empty drama that - with all its narrative ellipses - should have been called A Hundred Acres."

Godfrey Cheshire in Variety wrote: "Considering that Moorhouse made one of the best Australian directorial debuts of the last decade with Proof, a small film of great precision and insight, it's a shame that with this film and How to Make an American Quilt she seems to have consigned herself to a world of big-budget, broad-stroke Americana, where her skills are still evident but noticeably diluted. It's likewise regrettable that she's able to make so little use here of Leigh and Robards, who are as good as they can be in thankless roles. Lange and Pfeiffer are well-matched and generally fare better, even though they too are circumscribed by the lackluster writing. The film's standout perf, meanwhile, comes from Keith Carradine, who takes the relatively small role of Ginny's husband and manages to give it a degree of shading and dignity-unto-desperation."

Mick LaSalle in The San Francisco Chronicle wrote: "Imagine it. These great, blond, beautiful acting powerhouses, clashing and bonding and going for the throat. The scenes that could have been written. The movie that might have been made. Too bad, then, that A Thousand Acres, the film version of Jane Smiley's novel of the same name, should turn out to be a soap opera. Don't blame the actors. Their efforts succeed in keeping the bad news from the audience for almost half the picture. Pfeiffer has never been more fierce and committed, and just seeing Leigh and Lange in the same frame is gratifying... It's a picture guaranteed to inspire a kind of schizophrenic reaction in viewers: They'll wish it were better, yet still be glad it was made."

Rita Kempley wrote in The Washington Post: "Jane Smiley's novel A Thousand Acres has been called "King Lear in the cornfields," but the eagerly awaited screen adaptation is but a skeletal litany of miscarriages, mastectomies, sexual abuse, public humiliations and private betrayals. In many ways, it has less in common with Shakespeare's tragedy than with Stephen King's Iowa-set horror story, Children of the Corn... Of course, movie adaptations inevitably entail some simplification, but screenwriter Laura Jones, a New Zealander who also wrote three of Jane Campion's movies, all but exorcises the spirit of the novel. While she uses much of Smiley's dialogue verbatim and includes some of her lovely prose in Jessica Lange's narration, this meditation on the erosion of the family farm and the patriarchy that sustained it has been translated into a feminist screed."

Time Out London wrote: "Jane Smiley's novel earned points for chutzpah, but Jocelyn Moorhouse's adaptation makes heavy weather of this latter-day King Lear. Despite the leisurely Waltons-style voice-over, Larry Cook and his kin don't convince as a Midwestern farming dynasty, while the film itself has only a picturesque sense of the land. It makes for rocky terrain on which to base the ensuing melodramatics."

== Awards and nominations ==
Jessica Lange was nominated for the Golden Globe Award for Best Actress in a Motion Picture – Drama, losing to Judi Dench for her performance in Mrs. Brown.

== See also ==
- List of William Shakespeare screen adaptations
