= Moo (novel) =

Book by Jane Smiley

- First edition cover
- Author: Jane Smiley
- Cover artist: Jacket design by Barbara de Wilde
- Language: English
- Genre: Novel, comedy
- Publisher: Alfred A. Knopf
- Publication date: March 21, 1995
- Publication place: United States
- Media type: Print (Hardcover & Paperback) and audio cassette
- Pages: 414 pp (first edition, hardcover)
- ISBN: 0-679-42023-1 (first edition, hardcover)
- OCLC: 30547826
- Dewey Decimal: 813/.54 20
- LC Class: PS3569.M39 M66 1995

Moo is a 1995 novel by Jane Smiley. Its setting is a large university, known familiarly as "Moo U" because of its large agricultural college, in the American Midwest. The novel is a satire that uses a sprawling narrative style, following the lives of dozens of characters over the course of the 1989–1990 academic year. It was a finalist for the National Book Critics Circle Award for Fiction.

== Plot summary ==
Moo contains over a dozen overlapping plot lines and multiple protagonists and is therefore very difficult to summarize. The following summary includes the plot lines that are clearly resolved in the end of the novel.

=== Book One ===
Chapter one of Moo introduces Old Meats, a building at the center of the campus of Moo University no longer in use. However, Old Meats is home to a huge hog named Earl Butz whose only purpose in life is to eat as much as he would like in order to grow as large as possible as part of an experiment conducted by Dr. Bo Jones. Bob Carlson, a sophomore at Moo U, cares for Earl.

Chapter two introduces the Dubuque House, a large residence hall on campus and four of its newest residents Mary, Keri, Sherri and Diane. It is move-in day, and each of the four girls briefly reflects on what has brought her to Moo University and their hopes for their college careers. Timothy Monahan, a professor of English, is returning to the campus for the beginning of the school year. He meets one of the new faculty members, Spanish professor Cecelia Sanchez, when their classes end up being in neighboring rooms.

Marly Hellmich is an adult woman who works in the university cafeteria and lives at home caring for her elderly father. Marly also volunteers at her church, where she meets Nils Harstad, the dean of the agricultural extension. Later in Part One, Nils decides that what he needs to complete his life is a wife and a large family of small children. He decides that Marly would be the perfect mate and proposes to her. Marly contemplates the engagement and decides to accept on the basis that a life with Nils, a successful and economically stable older man, would offer her all of the things that she would not be able to have on her own; she believes she will become a kind of Cinderella.

Book One continues with a lecture given by economics professor Dr. Gift on Costa Rica and the economic gains to be found there. The lecture is well attended by students and faculty but during the lecture Chairman X, the chairman of the Horticulture department, becomes outraged and attempts to point out how detrimental Gift's pursuits will be to Costa Rica's environment.

Later, Ivar Harstad, provost of the university, meets with Elaine Dobbs-Jellinek, the associate vice-president, and Arlen Martin, CEO of the Trans National corporation. Arlen, a wealthy but not a moral businessman whose emphasis is on agricultural projects, is aware of the university's budget constraints and attempts to make a deal with them. He offers to give them money if they would devote some of their research facilities and faculty to help him on a project.

Another important aspect of Book One is the introduction of Loren Stroop, a local farmer and a paranoid old man who is so suspicious of the big agricultural companies and the CIA that he wears a bulletproof vest every day. This fear is promoted by the fact that Stroop is building a machine that he believes will revolutionize agriculture. Stroop meets with Nils to speak about the machine and the two men set up a future meeting for Nils to come to the farm and see the machine. At the close of Part One, though, Stroop suffers a stroke.

Joy Pfisterer oversees the university's fleet of horses and is also the girlfriend of Dean Jellinek. Joy is introduced while teaching a class in which Bob Carlson is a student. After class, Joy reflects on her relationship with Dean, one that is strained because of Dean's constant obsession over his calf-free lactation project and his failure to tend to Joy and their relationship.

Smiley closes Book One with a chapter entitled “Who’s in Bed With Whom” in which she lays out some of the intimate details of relationships occurring between various students and faculty including Mary and Hassan, a graduate student, Nils and Marly, Bob and Diane, Tim and Cecelia, Chairman X and Lady X, and Mrs. Walker and Mrs. Lake.

=== Book Two ===
Book Two, the shortest section of the book, opens with a news article detailing Governor Early's budget cuts, which include severe reductions for the university. The chapter also contains a series of memorandums within the university detailing the likely impact of the proposed cuts.

One of the most significant developments is the relationship between Cecelia and Chairman X. The two meet one day in the library where Cecelia is reminiscing about her former life in Los Angeles. She recognizes Chairman X from Dr. Gift's lecture. They strike up a conversation and surprisingly have sex on the library floor.

Meanwhile, Keri is failing Dr. Gift's economics class. She reflects on her family's experiences on their farm. When one of her uncles buys out the other, it causes a deep family division that ruins the family dynamic, and Keri blames her uncle's selfish drive for fortune and prosperity and his disregard for the family.

Chairman X and Cecelia continue their relationship. Cecelia fabricates a story about her uncle Carlos and his farm in Costa Rica and her childhood that she spent there. By telling the story she manages to convince X to stay longer and spend more time with her rather than returning home to have dinner with his family and take his children to a movie.

Book Two closes with a visit to Loren Stroop in the hospital after his stroke. His neighbors, the Millers, come to visit him and reassure him that they have taken care of everything around the farm except for visiting the shed where he keeps the machine locked up. He nods to try to tell them that they should look in the shed and tell someone about the machine but they fail to understand this since he cannot talk.

=== Book Three ===
The section opens with Dr. Gift reflecting on a report he wrote supporting the gold mine under a virgin cloud forest in Costa Rica. Mary, Keri, Sherri, and Diane are spending more time together. Mary is sick with a virus. Gary Olsen revises a short story, but is disappointed with the result. After a night at the library, Diane decides to follow Bob in hopes of learning the mystery of his work-study job and she meets Earl Butz. Tim and Cecelia have an unhappy date. Multiple characters discuss the fall of and importance of Eastern European communism.

Helen hosts a Thanksgiving feast with Ivar, Nils, Marly, and Marly's father. Marly's father and Nils debate Marly and Nils future, after Nils announces to everyone that “God’s plan” is that he and Marly have six children and live in Poland. Joy sets goals for her future, including marriage and a child.

Tim Monahan's third novel is accepted for publication. Helen, Dr. Garcia, Dr. Gift, and Dr. Cates consider Monahan's promotion to full professor. Dr. Gift says Monahan's writing is salacious, and Helen disagrees. Monahan's promotion is only given lukewarm approval. At the meeting, Helen distributes copies of Dr. Gift's paper to everyone at the meeting, revealing the virgin cloud forest mining project much to Gift's chagrin. Gary Olson and Lydia go out. Lydia suggests Gary should kick out Lyle, his roommate, so she could come over more often.

Margaret gets Tim to call Cecelia by giving him a copy of Dr. Gift's memo which she had secretly kept. A grant saves Old Meats, but it would have to be a chicken museum, which was not what Dr. Bo Jones requested. The book concludes with Mary being the victim of bigotry and feeling unable to discuss her experience with Keri, Sherri, and Diane. Gary continues to struggle with his writing.

=== Book Four ===
The main connection between characters in this section is the holidays. It is Christmas time, and Cecelia decides not to return to Los Angeles for the holiday because of Chairman X. However, she changes her mind the following day and goes to LA. A friend of Bob's comes to care for Earl Butz, and Earl notices and is shaken up by the change.

Drama unfolds in the X's household. Chairman X spends the holiday at home with his family. He admits to Lady X that he is having an affair with Cecelia. As they fight, they both make accusations and blame the other for their unhappiness.

Mary spends Christmas with her family. She is worried about her grades and somewhat disappointed she did not stay back at school. Joy is talking to Dean and becomes upset with their conversation. She goes outside, runs, and remains outside until she is nearly frozen to death. When she returns home Dean has to take care of her until an ambulance arrives.

It is time to ring in the New Year. Chairman X writes a flyer opposing the destruction of the virgin cloud rain forest and revealing Gift's role in the scheme. The media reports on the issue and tries to unravel the controversy. As word spreads of the mining plan, chaos occurs. Dean Nils Harstad is attacked by Chairman X. Tensions run high between Mary, Keri, Sherri, and Diane in Dubuque House until they hear about the riot at Lafayette Hall and leave to go there.

=== Book Five ===
Book five opens with Dr. Margaret Bell arriving at a conference in Florida where she is to present a paper. Her senses seem to awaken through this mini get-away, and she indulges in the experience. When the conference is abruptly cancelled, Margaret ends her vacation and receives a large bill.

Back on campus, Dr. Gift reflects on Arlen Martin and the collapse of Seven Stones Mining. A memo is sent out announcing more proposed cuts in the budget, resulting in threats of layoffs. Another setback for the university occurs when Elaine Jellinek breaks the news to Dr. Bo Jones that there is no longer a grant for the chicken museum. Dr. Jones does not seem very disappointed and decides to take a trip to Kirghizia to research wild boars.

Loren Stroop has moved home and maneuvers around on his own to the best of his ability. Although his physical stamina has diminished, his quirky personality still remains. Feeling the need to check up on his invention, Loren attempts to travel out to his barn during a snowstorm. He struggles against the winter wind and falls into the heavy snow, never reaching his destination. He perishes in the storm.

The announcement of a future McDonald's takes the campus by surprise and forces Marly to contemplate her existence on campus. She decides to leave her job as well as abandon her relationship with Nils. In the end, Marly chooses to run off with her truck driver boyfriend. Another major event at the university occurs during the destruction of Old Meats. This pivotal scene showcases Earl Butz as he is trapped inside the building during the demolition. Bob realizes that Earl is in danger but is unable to stop the destruction process. Earl is aware of his dire situation. Instinct takes over, and Earl takes off running, making his way across campus. As Bob tries to catch Earl, Mrs. Walker, Chairman X, and Keri all witness Earl's rampage through the university. Earl eventually stops from exhaustion and falls dead at the feet of Keri. His death makes front-page news.

Dean and Joy work on their couple's therapy. Dean immerses himself in helping Joy out of her depression, which she finds exhausting. Cecelia continues to struggle with finding her place in the Midwest and Moo University, and considers returning to California. As the cutbacks continue to stress the faculty, Mrs. Walker realizes that her job is on the line as a result of leaking Gift's memo as well as the discovery that she has transferred funds from the athletic budget to the library. Mary, Keri, Sherri, and Diane seem to be heading their separate ways as the school year closes out. For the following year, Sherri makes plans to room with friends from high school, and Mary decides to return to Chicago. When some of the future plans fall through, Mary and Keri decide to reside together again. As the university's future appears bleak, Ivar reflects on how he originally viewed the university and how things have changed since he and Nils were first students at Moo.

Just when the university seems doomed, Joe Miller arrives with a sense of hope by carrying out Stroop's wishes to donate his invention to the university. Ivar, Nils, Bob Brown, and the president all assemble to begin a frantic search for the blue prints for Stroop's machine. Coincidentally, Dr. Cates acquired these blue prints from a student, and thinking they were a work of art, Cates calls Mrs. Walker in effort to discover who the artist might be. At the same time, the committee contacts Mrs. Walker to discuss Stroop's donation. Gaining power with this information, Mrs. Walker not only connects the missing prints to the hands in need, but saves her own position.

The discovery of the machine uplifts everyone's spirits and causes the governor to reverse the budget cuts. The campus atmosphere starts to lighten. Marriage comes into play towards the end of the novel when several characters contemplate their relationships and their plans for the future. Dr. Gift and Elaine Jellinek dine together and day-dream about the possibility of a life with each other, but in the end, they each discard the thought. Marriage is not in the cards for Nils and Marly, but Nils and Marly's father reach an understanding and decide to reside with one another due to Marly's absence.

The biggest turn-around occurs between Chairman X and Lady X as they resolve their disputes and reunite their family. Chairman and Lady X have a small wedding which attracts the curiosity of the neighbors and close friends. The marriage upsets Cecelia, who has decided to stay, but Tim convinces her that this is for the best. The book then closes as Chairman X and Lady X embrace in a “legendary” kiss.

== Characters ==
Chairman X: Chairman of the Horticulture Department who wants to save Old Meats; in an open relationship with Lady X, they have four children; becomes involved with Cecelia. He has left-wing political beliefs and hates Dr. Gift and Nils Harstad.

Bob Carlson: Sophomore work-study student who takes care of Earl Butz for Dr. Bo Jones; dates Diane, lives with Gary Olson and Lyle Kartensen.

Earl Butz: 18-month-old Landrace boar who is the subject of Dr. Bo Jones’ secret experiment to see how big a pig can grow; cared for by Bob Carlson. Name refers to Earl Butz, former secretary of agriculture who was responsible for the modern farm subsidy system who during his tenure frequently admonished farmers to "Get big or get out."

Dr. Bo Jones: Animal Science professor conducting a secret experiment on Earl Butz; goes missing during one of his travels to find wild boars.

Lady (Beth) X: Lives with and has four children with Chairman X, but not married.

Cecelia Sanchez: First year assistant professor of foreign languages from Los Angeles who becomes involved with Chairman X.

Tim Monahan: Self-centered associate professor of English who teaches fiction writing and is being considered for promotion to full professor.

Keri: The “mother” figure of the four roommates in Dubuque House who grew up on a farm in Iowa.

Sherri: One of the four roommates in Dubuque House; struggles with her classes and weight issues.

Mary Jackson: One of the four roommates in Dubuque House who is from Chicago, Illinois.

Diane Peterson: One of the four roommates in Dubuque House; has a relationship with Bob Carlson and wants to be in a sorority.

Dr. Margaret Bell: English professor on the tenure and promotion committee who was involved with Tim Monahan.

Dr. Helen Levy: Professor of foreign languages, French and Italian, who is a member of the tenure and promotion committee; involved in discreet, long-term relationship with Ivar Harstad; loves cooking and gardening.

Governor O.T. Early: State governor who threatens numerous budget cuts to Moo University.

Associate Vice President Elaine Dobbs-Jellinek: Associate Vice President for Development; writes grants, tries to help Dr. Bo Jones save Old Meats.

Gary Olson: Student in Tim Monahan's fiction writing class; lives with Bob Carlson and Lyle Kartensen.

Dr. Lionel Gift: Economics professor who is obsessed with money and writes a report in support of mining for gold in Costa Rica; chair of the tenure and promotion committee.

Provost Ivar Harstad: Twin brother of Nils Harstad who is in a long-term relationship with Helen Levy; his secretary is Mrs. Walker.

Dean Nils Harstad: Dean of extension; twin brother of Ivar Harstad who plans to marry Marly Hellmich, a woman from his church, and have six children; approached by Loren Stroop for funding of his invention.

“Father” Helmich: Marly Hellmich's ultra conservative, Christian father who requires constant care.

Marly Helmich: Cafeteria worker who agrees to marry Nils Harstad, a man from her church.

Dr. Dean Jellinek: Animal Science professor who is researching calf-free lactation with grant funding; divorced from Elaine Dobbs-Jellinek and in a relationship with Joy Pfisterer.

Mrs. (Martha) Lake: Mrs. Walker's partner

Lydia Henderson: Lyle Kartensen's girlfriend; character in Gary Olson's stories.

Lyle Kartensen: Roommates with Gary Olson and Bob Carlson; Lydia Henderson's boyfriend.

Arlen Martin: Head of TransNational America Corporation, which is planning to mine gold in Costa Rica under the last virgin cloud forest.

Jack Parker: Federal grant specialist; Elaine Dobbs-Jellinek's competition.

Joy Pfisterer: Trains horses and teaches an equine class; in a relationship with Dr. Dean Jellinek.

Loren Stroop: A paranoid farmer who has invented a farming machine and wears a bulletproof vest all the time.

Alison Thomas: Elaine Dobbs-Jellinek's secretary.

Mrs. (Loraine) Walker: Ivar Harstad's secretary who wields great informal power within the university and continually transfers funds between budgets without approval.

Associate Vice President Bob Brown (“Just Plain Brown”): Assistant to the university president; refers to students as customers.

Dr. William Garcia: Member of the tenure and promotion committee from the Psychology department; close friend to Chairman X.

Dr. John Vernon Cates: Member of the tenure and promotion committee from the Chemistry department.

Joe Miller: Loren Stroop's neighbor.

== Themes ==
I call my novel a slippery-slope academic novel, in which academia is not cut off from the world, but is constantly contaminating the world, is constantly both re-creating the world in its own image and re-creating the world. - Jane Smiley

"Developmental Events", such as the history of divorces and separations among the characters are important to this book. Similarly, teachers and mentors of both sexes are seen trying to cultivate their own talents, making them appear larger than life. Smiley helps nurture Mrs. Walker's genius in the book, creating a hero-like character that has a quiet feminine power that is often overlooked in some books. She is seen as someone “with quite complex power relationships…a person who gets things done” even though she is a mere secretary. In contrast to this, all the administrators who are men are much older and do not have as big a role as Mrs. Walker in making decisions. Also, Mrs. Walker represents “tacit power…which construct[s] administrative workers as low level females.” The overt/position power is weak when it comes to Mrs. Walker's knowledge of the university, which she withholds unless asked, making her the most powerful character in Moo.

Smiley also helps bring out themes of her life by writing about them in Moo. Two of the topics in the book are the issues with the history of divorce and break up. Smiley has been divorced three times, and many of her characters have complicated and interlaced relationships with one another (the relationship between Lady X and Chairman X, the ridiculous marriage of Dr. Dean Jellinek and Joy, and the failed relationship with Dean Nils Harsted and Marly Helmich). The mixture of relationships and satire in Moo creates absurd problems between the characters, but Smiley is still able to make it believable.

There is a “popular assumption that the academy is a ‘closed society’—idiosyncratic, isolated, out of touch with the ‘real world.” Moo U. is actually a part of the surrounding culture instead of a separate entity, and it “may be set off from the larger culture, but it is never cut off, a lifeline of money being necessary for its well-being and growth.” It is a symbol of the town itself. The search for a “comic protagonist to lead an unauthorized, irrelevant tour through academia” is and seems misguided. It is also considered a social comedy, where “no individual being is the heroic center of the institution.”

== Key events ==
In Chapter 21, Loren Stroop suffers a stroke, leaving his plans for the revolutionary equipment he builds in limbo. This eventually leads to the solution to the lack of funding that threatens the well-being and livelihoods of the characters of Moo as the university eventually receives control of the machine.

In Chapter 22, Governor Early proposes budget cuts that lead to the near downfall of Moo University. The faculty begins downsizing and the class sizes for students become larger.

In Chapter 34, Dr. Gift finishes his report for the Transnational America Corporation discussing mining for gold in the last virgin cloud forest in Costa Rica. This sets forth the course of action that leads to professors choosing sides on the issue of the mining proposal.

In Chapter 47, Joe Doakes utters a racial slur to Mary, an African-American student at Moo University. Mary's roommates at the Dubuque House drive Joe Doakes away from the table with insults (though Mary is uncertain as to whether they heard what Doakes said). Mary goes on a downward spiral of social withdrawal as she realizes the roommates do not discuss anything that may create tension between themselves.

In Chapter 64, Earl Butz escapes from Old Meats as the building is torn down. Earl Butz exemplifies the embracing of the idea that bigger is better as he is a project that no one but the few people directly involved know anything about. When he escapes, he becomes a public symbol of a university in crisis.

== Reception of Moo ==
In the text "And Moo To You Too" Jane Smiley describes her experience of her book tour for the novel. She explains that while writing the satirical novel, she not only knew what it was about for her but that she also had thought she had an idea about how readers would view it and was surprised to find that the reception was not what she expected: Critics and readers did not seem to know about what Smiley was writing.

Critics had very different responses to Moo: Some felt that the book was extremely funny, others less so. Some spoke of characters with no depth or shape, while others noted that they had come to care about the outcome of the characters' lives.

In the text Smiley speaks about how this made her feel irritable because she had spent over a year writing the novel and had thought that her feeling and passions were well displayed, but none of this was mentioned by critics. She concludes that after that shock she came to see it as a good thing that the novel could be read in two ways and states she had intended for it to be tricky and evasive, "And then, it turned out, that's exactly what it was!"
