= Hey, Kiddo =

2018 graphic memoir by Jarrett J. Krosoczka

Hey, Kiddo: How I Lost My Mother, Found My Father, and Dealt with Family Addiction
- Author: Jarrett J. Krosoczka
- Language: English
- Genre: Graphic memoir
- Publisher: Graphix
- Publication date: October 9, 2018
- Publication place: United States
- Media type: Print (Hardcover), Audiobook
- Pages: 320
- ISBN: 9780545902489

Hey, Kiddo: How I Lost My Mother, Found My Father, and Dealt with Family Addiction is a graphic memoir by Jarrett J. Krosoczka, published October 9, 2018 by Graphix. The book tells the story of Krosoczka's childhood living with his grandparents while his mother lived with a substance use disorder.

== Reception ==
=== Reviews ===
Hey, Kiddo is a Junior Library Guild book. It received universal acclaim, including starred reviews from Booklist, The Bulletin of the Center for Children's Books, The Horn Book, Kirkus Reviews, Publishers Weekly, School Library Journal, and Shelf Awareness.

Kirkus called the book "[h]onest, important, and timely."

Writing for Booklist, Sarah Hunter noted, "There have been a slew of graphic memoirs published for youth in the past couple of years, but the raw, confessional quality and unguarded honesty of Krosoczka's contribution sets it apart from the crowd."

Kelley Gile of School Library Journal said it was "[a] compelling, sometimes raw look at how addiction can affect families. A must-have, this book will empower readers, especially those who feel alone in difficult situations."

The audiobook, narrated by Krosoczka and a cast of others, is a Junior Library Guild book. It also received a starred review from Booklist, who said, "It's some sort of spectacular... In a production that is meticulously produced and spellbinding to experience, Krosoczka's challenging childhood becomes a cathartic, captivating friends-and-family aural affair to remember."

Hey, Kiddo was named one of the best nonfiction books of 2018 by The Horn Book.

=== Awards ===
Awards and honors for Hey, Kiddo
Year	Award/Honor	Result	Ref.
2018	Booklist's Best Arts Books for Youth	Top 10	
2018	Booklist Editors' Choice: Books for Youth	Selection	
2018	Booklist Top of the List for Youth Nonfiction	Selection	
2018	Goodreads Choice Award for Graphic Novels & Comics	Nominee	
2018	Los Angeles Times Book Prize for Young Adult Literature	Finalist	
2018	National Book Award for Young People's Literature	Finalist	
2019	ALSC Notable Children's Books	Selection	
2019	Booklist's Best Graphic Novels for Youth	Top 10	
2019	Booklist's Best Biographies for Youth	Top 10	
2019	Booklist Editors' Choice: Youth Audio	Selection	
2019	Boston Globe–Horn Book Award for Nonfiction	Honor	
2019	Dragon Award for Best Graphic Novel	Nominee	
2019	YALSA Award for Excellence in Nonfiction for Young Adults	Finalist	
2019	YALSA's Great Graphic Novels for Teens	Top 10	
2019	YALSA Quick Picks for Reluctant Young Adult Readers	Top 10	
2020	Audie Award for Young Adult Title	Finalist	
2020	Odyssey Award	Winner	
2020	Rhode Island Teen Book Award	Nominee	
2020	YALSA Amazing Audiobooks for Young Adults	Top 10	
