= The Man Who Invented the Computer =

Biography by Jane Smiley

- First edition
- Author: Jane Smiley
- Language: English
- Subject: John Vincent Atanasoff
- Genre: Biography
- Publisher: Doubleday
- Publication date: 2010

The Man Who Invented the Computer is a 2010 historical biography by author Jane Smiley about American physicist John Vincent Atanasoff and the invention of the computer. The book follows Atanasoff as he collaborates with others to develop the 1942 Atanasoff–Berry Computer (ABC), the first electronic digital computing device.

== See also ==
- List of pioneers in computer science
