= Mercury Rising =

1998 film by Harold Becker

- Theatrical release poster
- Directed by: Harold Becker
- Screenplay by: Lawrence Konner; Mark Rosenthal
- Based on: Simple Simon by Ryne Douglas Pearson
- Produced by: Brian Grazer; Karen Kehela
- Starring: Bruce Willis; Alec Baldwin; Miko Hughes; Chi McBride; Kim Dickens
- Cinematography: Michael Seresin
- Edited by: Peter Honess
- Music by: John Barry
- Production companies: Universal Pictures; Imagine Entertainment
- Distributed by: Universal Pictures
- Release date: April 3, 1998
- Running time: 111 minutes
- Country: United States
- Language: English
- Budget: $60 million
- Box office: $93.1 million

Mercury Rising is a 1998 American action thriller film directed by Harold Becker, starring Bruce Willis, Alec Baldwin, and Miko Hughes. Willis plays Art Jeffries, an undercover FBI agent who protects a nine-year-old autistic boy, Simon Lynch (Hughes), who is targeted by government assassins after he inadvertently cracks a top secret government code. The film is based on Ryne Douglas Pearson's 1996 novel Simple Simon, which was the working title of the film.

Mercury Rising was released by Universal Pictures on April 3, 1998, to mostly negative reviews from critics and grossed $93.1 million at the box office against a $60 million budget.

== Plot ==
The film opens with a bank robbery hostage crisis in South Dakota. Undercover as one of the criminals, FBI agent Art Jeffries guards fourteen-year-old James while trying to convince the gang’s leader, Edgar Halstrom, to surrender. Despite pleading for more time to negotiate, an armed FBI task force storms the building, fatally shooting both James and the suspects. Art confronts his superior, Hartley, with a sucker punch when he says they must report to Washington. As a result of his outburst, Jeffries is demoted to desk duty.

Meanwhile, in Chicago, a nine-year-old autistic savant named Simon Lynch is given a sophisticated puzzle book by his teacher. Simon quickly solves a particular puzzle and phones a number encoded in the solution. This call reaches two National Security Agency cryptographers, Dean Crandell and Leo Pedranski, who created the new cypher Simon has cracked code-named "Mercury". Pedranski and Crandell report the situation to their intellectual superior, Lieutenant Colonel Nicholas Kudrow, who severely rebukes the pair for their unauthorized actions, describing Simon and his abilities as a national security threat. Two assassins, Peter Burrell and Shayes, are sent by Kudrow to kill the boy and his parents, Martin and Jenny. Posing as a police detective, Burrell murders both Simon's mother and father, but is unable to find Simon himself. Upon discovering that Martin dialed 911 before he died, Burrell stages a murder/suicide between him and his wife Jenny before escaping the Lynch residence with Shayes as his getaway driver.

Jeffries is sent to investigate the crime scene and finds Simon in a hidden crawl space in his bedroom closet. Simon is taken to a protection ward at the hospital, where a nurse explains the nature of Simon's autism to Art, and why he cannot be interrogated. Burrell impersonates a doctor and makes another attempt on Simon's life. Art saves Simon and flees the premises, and tries unsuccessfully to convince Simon that he is a friend instead of a stranger. Later, while on a train, Shayes tries to kill Simon, but Art intervenes, knocking him off the train and onto the tracks as another locomotive passes by, killing him.

Under Kudrow's direction, the NSA frames Art as Simon's kidnapper. However, fellow agent and close friend Thomas Jordan does not believe the story and assists Art, who borrows Jordan's car and takes Simon back to his house. Simon again calls the telephone number written into the code and Art is able to talk to Crandell and Pedranski. As Crandell arranges a meeting at the Wrigley Building by the next morning, Art goes to the meeting, leaving Simon under the care of a woman in a Starbucks, Stacey Siebring, who later agrees to help Art take care of Simon. Crandell tells Jeffries about Mercury and Kudrow, but is shot dead by Burrell before he can reveal every detail.

Pedranski, having learned of Crandell's fate, tries to reveal Kudrow's unlawful actions by writing letters on a typewriter: one to Art and a carbon copy for the Senate Oversight Committee, but Burrell tracks Pedranski down and kills him as well, confiscating the letters. However, the assassin overlooks Pedranski's carbon copies, which his girlfriend, NSA analyst Emily Lang, takes to the FBI. Jordan discreetly arranges for her to meet with Art to show them the carbon copies; covered in Pedranski’s fingerprints, they become crucial evidence. Art then goes to Kudrow’s estate during his birthday party, confronting him in his wine cellar. He berates the NSA head for targeting Simon, demands that Kudrow announce on national TV that the Mercury Encryption Project is a failure, and kicks him for trying to justify his crimes on grounds of protecting American spies.

Considering Art's suggestion, Jordan arranges for Simon to go into the Witness Protection Program, but Kudrow, unwilling to reveal his failure and determined to kill Simon, forcibly takes charge of the Witness Protection while revealing to Dean Lomax, the FBI Special Agent in charge, that Jordan forged the witness protection documents. However, unaware to Kudrow, Tommy shows the carbon paper evidence to Lomax and confirms that the fingerprint markings on it were Pedranski's, validating the evidence against Kudrow. Stacey and Simon leave for the pick-up point at the top of a skyscraper, where Kudrow and Burrell prepare to take Simon away on a helicopter, but Art, with Jordan and cooperation from an FBI task force, sets a trap at the meeting spot. A gunfight ensues between Burrell and the FBI, ending with Burrell being fatally slashed by glass shards when the plexiglass windows are blown inward, while Art fights Kudrow one-on-one, and Simon assists him by retrieving Kudrow's gun. Kudrow attempts to throw Simon off the roof, but Jeffries shoots the former multiple times, and he falls off the edge and to his death on a glass celling.

Art and Stacy later visit Simon, now living with foster parents, at his school. Simon embraces Art as a welcome friend, having accepted him as a person he trusts.

== Cast ==
- Bruce Willis as FBI Special Agent Arthur "Art" Jeffries
- Alec Baldwin as Lieutenant Colonel Nicholas "Nick" Kudrow
- Miko Hughes as Simon Lynch
- Chi McBride as FBI Special Agent Thomas "Tommy" Jordan
- Kim Dickens as Stacey Siebring
- Robert Stanton as Dean Crandell
- Bodhi Pine Elfman as Leo Pedranski
- Carrie Preston as Emily Lang
- L. L. Ginter as NSA Agent Peter Burrell
- Peter Stormare as NSA Agent Shayes
- Kevin Conway as FBI Special Agent-In-Charge Joe Lomax
- John Carroll Lynch as Martin Lynch
- Kelley Hazen as Jenny Lynch
- John Doman as FBI Supervisor Hartley
- Richard Riehle as Edgar Halstrom
- Chad Lindberg as James
- Camryn Manheim as Dr. London
- Jack Conley as Detective Jack Nichols

== Production ==
=== Development ===
Barry Sonnenfeld was initially slated to direct the film, but due to commitments to Men in Black dropped out and was replaced with Harold Becker.

=== Casting ===
Prior to Bruce Willis' casting, Nicolas Cage and George Clooney were also considered for the lead role.

== Release ==
=== Home media ===
Mercury Rising was released for VHS and DVD on September 15, 1998, followed by LaserDisc on September 22. The Collector's Edition and DTS versions for DVD were released in 1999. A Blu-ray with Multi-Format was released on September 14, 2010, and the Double Feature with the film and The Jackal was also released for Blu-ray on March 22, 2011.

== Reception ==
=== Box office ===
Mercury Rising earned $10,104,715 in its opening weekend in 2,386 theaters, ranking in third place behind Lost in Space and Titanic. Altogether, the film grossed $32,935,289 in the United States and $60,172,000 internationally for a total of $93,107,289.

=== Critical response ===
On Rotten Tomatoes, Mercury Rising has a score of 21% based on reviews from 57 critics with an average rating of 4.37/10. The consensus states: "Mercury Rising lays the action on thick, but can never find a dramatic pulse to keep viewers – or Bruce Willis – engaged with its maudlin story." Audiences polled by CinemaScore gave the film an average grade of "B" on an A+ to F scale.

Roger Ebert gave the film two stars out of four, writing: "Mercury Rising is about the most sophisticated cryptographic system known to man, and about characters considerably denser than anyone in the audience. Sitting in the dark, our minds idly playing with the plot, we figure out what they should do, how they should do it, and why they should do it, while the characters on the screen strain helplessly against the requirements of the formula." James Berardinelli rated it one and a half out of four stars, saying: "The script for Mercury Rising is exceptionally tiresome and hard-to-swallow. ... Once again, certain standby plot elements – the high-level government conspiracy and the maverick law enforcement agent – are recycled, and not to good effect. While Bruce Willis can play the action hero as well as anyone in Hollywood, this particular outing leaves him marooned in situations that are characterized by too little tension and too much nonsense."

=== Accolades ===
Bruce Willis received the 1999 Golden Raspberry Award as Worst Actor for his performance (as well as for Armageddon and The Siege).

Miko Hughes won the category of Best Performance in a Feature Film—Leading Young Actor at the 20th Youth in Film Awards in 1999 for his portrayal of Simon.

== See also ==
- Mental calculators in fiction
- RSA Secret-Key Challenge
