= Paul Shipton =

British children's writer (born 1963)

- Born: 15 June 1963 (age 63); Manchester, England
- Education: M.Phil., M.A. in Classics
- Occupations: Novelist, book editor
- Writing career
- Pen name: Paul Cooper
- Genre: Children's
- Notable works: The Pig Scrolls; The Pig Who Saved the World

Paul Shipton (born 1963) is an English children's author.

He was born in Manchester and attended Emmanuel College, Cambridge and Manchester University. After completing two master's degrees (in Classics and Philosophy), he taught English in Istanbul for a year. After returning to the UK, he taught English as a foreign language for several years, and it was around this time that he published his first book, Zargon Zoo (1991). Four years later, he published Bug Muldoon and the Garden of Fear, and relocated with his family to Wisconsin, United States where he works as a freelance writer and editor. He also writes books for younger readers under the pen name Paul Cooper. He, his wife and two daughters, now divide their time between Cambridge, England and Madison, Wisconsin.

== Partial bibliography ==
- Zargon Zoo (1991)
- Bug Muldoon and the Garden of Fear (1995)
- The Mighty Skink (1996)
- Bug Muldoon and the Killer in the Rain (1998) (winner of the Austrian Children's Book of the year)
- Ghost in the Guitar
- The Man Who Was Hate (2000)
- The Pig Scrolls (2002)
- The Pig Who Saved the World (2005) (winner of the Nestlé Children's Book Prize Bronze Award in 2006)

As Paul Cooper:

- Pigs in Planes: The Chicken Egg-splosion (2010)
- Pigs in Planes: The Shark Bites Back (2010)
- Pigs in Planes: The Big Baad Sheep (2010)
- Pigs in Planes: The Mega Monkey Mystery (2010)
- the House on the Moors (1994)
