= Jarrett J. Krosoczka =

American author and illustrator

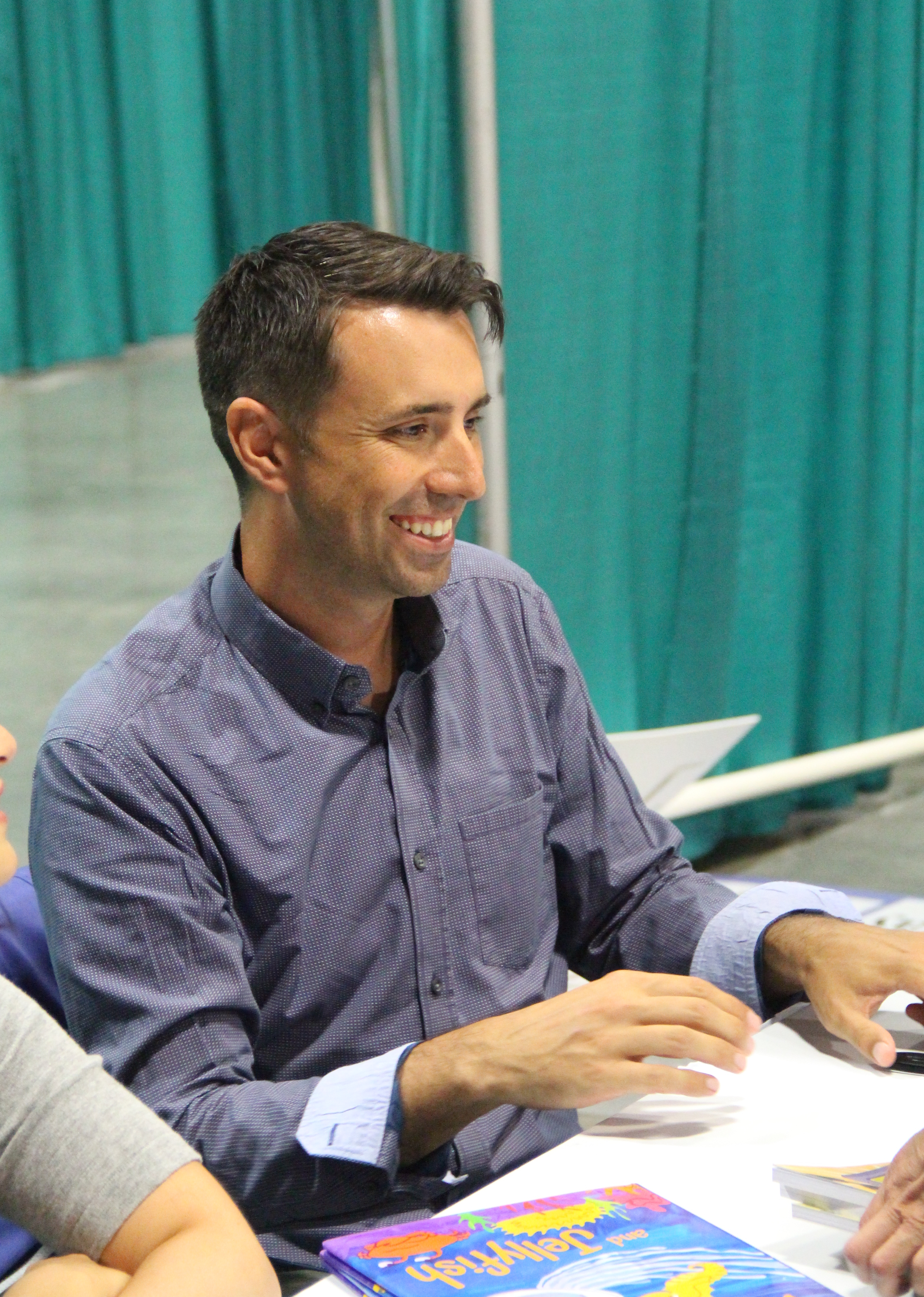
- Krosoczka at the 2015 National Book Festival
- Born: December 22, 1977 (age 48); Worcester, Massachusetts, U.S.
- Occupation: graphic novelist
- Writing career
- Notable awards: Harvey Award (Hey, Kiddo) National Book Award finalist (Hey, Kiddo) Odyssey Award (Hey, Kiddo) Audie Award (Hey, Kiddo) Boston Globe–Horn Book Award for Non-Fiction (Sunshine)
- Website: www.studiojjk.com

Jarrett J. Krosoczka (/krʌˈzɒskʌ/ krə-ZOSS-kə) (born December 22, 1977, in Worcester, Massachusetts) is the author and illustrator of several graphic novels and picture books, most famously his Lunch Lady series.

== Life ==
Krosoczka was raised entirely by his maternal grandparents, Joseph and Shirley Krosoczka, who took legal custody of him when he was three because of his mother's drug addiction. He saw his mother only sporadically throughout his childhood, and didn't learn the truth about her addiction until he was in the fourth grade. The "J" in his professional name is in tribute to his late grandfather. He also established the Joseph and Shirley Krosoczka Memorial Youth Scholarships at the Worcester Art Museum in tribute to his grandparents. The scholarships provide tuition to underprivileged children who are in unique familial situations.

Krosoczka later went on to graduate from Rhode Island School of Design, and received his first book contract six months after graduation. (He had been submitting for two years at that point.) His first book, Good Night, Monkey Boy, was published on June 12, 2001, by Random House.

Krosoczka was also an instructor at Montserrat College of Art for four years.

In 2003, Krosoczka was chosen by Print as one of their 20 Top New Visual Artists Under 30. A Universal Studios movie based on Krosoczka's Lunch Lady series was in development with Amy Poehler in the lead role. Additional film and television options for Krosoczka's work have been with DreamWorks Animation, Walden Media, and MGM. Weston Woods produced an animated adaptation of Krosoczka's Peanut Butter and Jellyfish.

Hey, Kiddo was a finalist in the 2018 National Book Award for Young People's Literature, and it won the 2019 Harvey Award for Book of the Year.

== Books ==
- Good Night, Monkey Boy, 2001, Random House
- Baghead, 2002, Random House
- Bubble Bath Pirates!, 2003, Viking
- Annie Was Warned, 2003, Random House
- Max for President, 2004, Random House
- Punk Farm, 2005, Random House (through Knopf Books for Young Readers)
- Giddy Up, Cowgirl, 2006, Penguin Putnam
- My Buddy, Slug, 2006, Random House
- Punk Farm on Tour, 2007, Random House
- Lunch Lady and the Cyborg Substitute (Lunch Lady, #1), 2009, Knopf Books for Young Readers
- Lunch Lady and the League of Librarians (Lunch Lady, #2), 2009, Knopf Books for Young Readers
- Lunch Lady and the Author Visit Vendetta (Lunch Lady, #3), 2009, Knopf Books for Young Readers
- Lunch Lady and the Summer Camp Shakedown (Lunch Lady, #4), 2010, Knopf Books for Young Readers
- Lunch Lady and the Bake Sale Bandit (Lunch Lady, #5), 2010, Knopf Books for Young Readers
- Lunch Lady and the Field Trip Fiasco (Lunch Lady, #6), 2011, Knopf Books for Young Readers
- Lunch Lady and the Mutant Mathletes (Lunch Lady, #7), 2012, Knopf Books for Young Readers
- Lunch Lady and the Picture Day Peril (Lunch Lady, #8), 2012, Knopf Books for Young Readers
- Platypus Police Squad: The Frog Who Croaked, 2013, HarperCollins Publishers
- Lunch Lady and the Video Game Villain (Lunch Lady, #9), 2013, Knopf Books for Young Readers
- 'Lunch Lady and the Schoolwide Scuffle' (Lunch Lady, #10), 2014, Knopf Books for Young Readers
- Star Wars Jedi Academy: A New Class, 2016, Scholastic (continuing Jeffrey Brown's Star Wars Jedi Academy series, with brand new characters)
- Star Wars Jedi Academy: The Force Oversleeps, 2017, Scholastic
- Star Wars Jedi Academy: The Principal Strikes Back, 2018, Scholastic
- Hey, Kiddo, 2018, Graphix, ISBN 978-0545902472
- Star Wars Jedi Academy: Revenge of the Sis (A Christina Starspeeder Story), 2019, Scholastic (with co-author/illustrator Amy Ignatow)
- Star Wars Jedi Academy: Attack of the Furball (A Christina Starspeeder Story), 2019, Scholastic (with co-author/illustrator Amy Ignatow)
- Star Wars Jedi Academy: At Last, Jedi (A Christina Starspeeder Story), 2020, Scholastic (with co-author/illustrator Amy Ignatow)
- Sunshine, 2023, Graphix, ISBN 978-1338356311
