= Jane Smiley =

American novelist (born 1949)

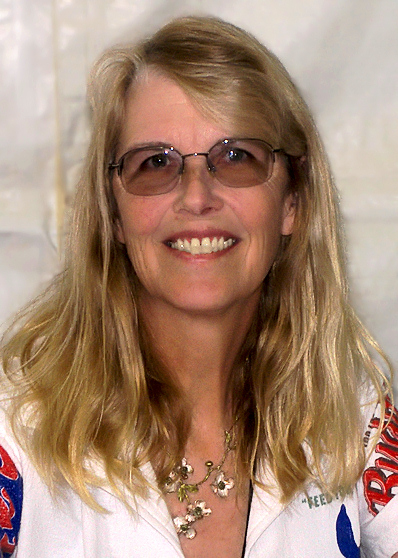
- Smiley at the 2009 Texas Book Festival
- Born: September 26, 1949 (age 76); Los Angeles, California, U.S.
- Education: Vassar College (AB); University of Iowa (MA, MFA, PhD)
- Awards: Pulitzer Prize for Fiction, 1992; American Academy of Arts and Letters, 2001

Jane Smiley (born September 26, 1949) is an American novelist. She won the Pulitzer Prize for Fiction in 1992 for her novel A Thousand Acres (1991).

== Biography ==
Born in Los Angeles, California, Smiley grew up in Webster Groves, Missouri, a suburb of St Louis, and graduated from Community School and from John Burroughs School. She obtained an AB degree in literature at Vassar College (1971), then earned an MA (1975), MFA (1976) and PhD (1978) from the University of Iowa. While working toward her doctorate, she also spent a year studying in Iceland as a Fulbright Scholar. From 1981 to 1996 she was a Professor of English at Iowa State University, teaching undergraduate and graduate creative-writing workshops. In 1996, she relocated to California. She returned to teaching creative writing at the University of California, Riverside, in 2015.

=== Career ===
Smiley published her first novel, Barn Blind, in 1980, and won a 1985 O. Henry Award for her short story "Lily", which was published in The Atlantic Monthly. Her best-selling A Thousand Acres, a story based on William Shakespeare's King Lear, received the Pulitzer Prize for Fiction in 1992. It was adapted into a film of the same title in 1997. Her novella The Age of Grief was made into the 2002 film The Secret Lives of Dentists. Her essay "Feminism Meets the Free Market" was included in the 2006 anthology Mommy Wars by Washington Post writer Leslie Morgan Steiner. Her essay "Why Bother?" appears in the anthology Knitting Yarns: Writers on Knitting, published by W. W. Norton & Company in 2013.

Thirteen Ways of Looking at the Novel (2005) is a non-fiction meditation on the history and the nature of the novel, somewhat in the tradition of E. M. Forster's seminal Aspects of the Novel, and roams from eleventh-century Japan's Murasaki Shikibu's The Tale of Genji to 21st-century American women's literature.

In 2001, Smiley was elected a member of The American Academy of Arts and Letters. She has participated in the annual Los Angeles Times Festival of Books, the Cheltenham Festival, the National Book Festival, the Hay Festival of Literature and the Arts and many others. She won the PEN USA Lifetime Achievement Award in 2006, and chaired the judges' panel for the prestigious Man Booker International Prize in 2009.

Jonathan Franzen, author of The Corrections (2001), considers Smiley's book The Greenlanders to be greatly underappreciated and among the best works of contemporary American fiction.

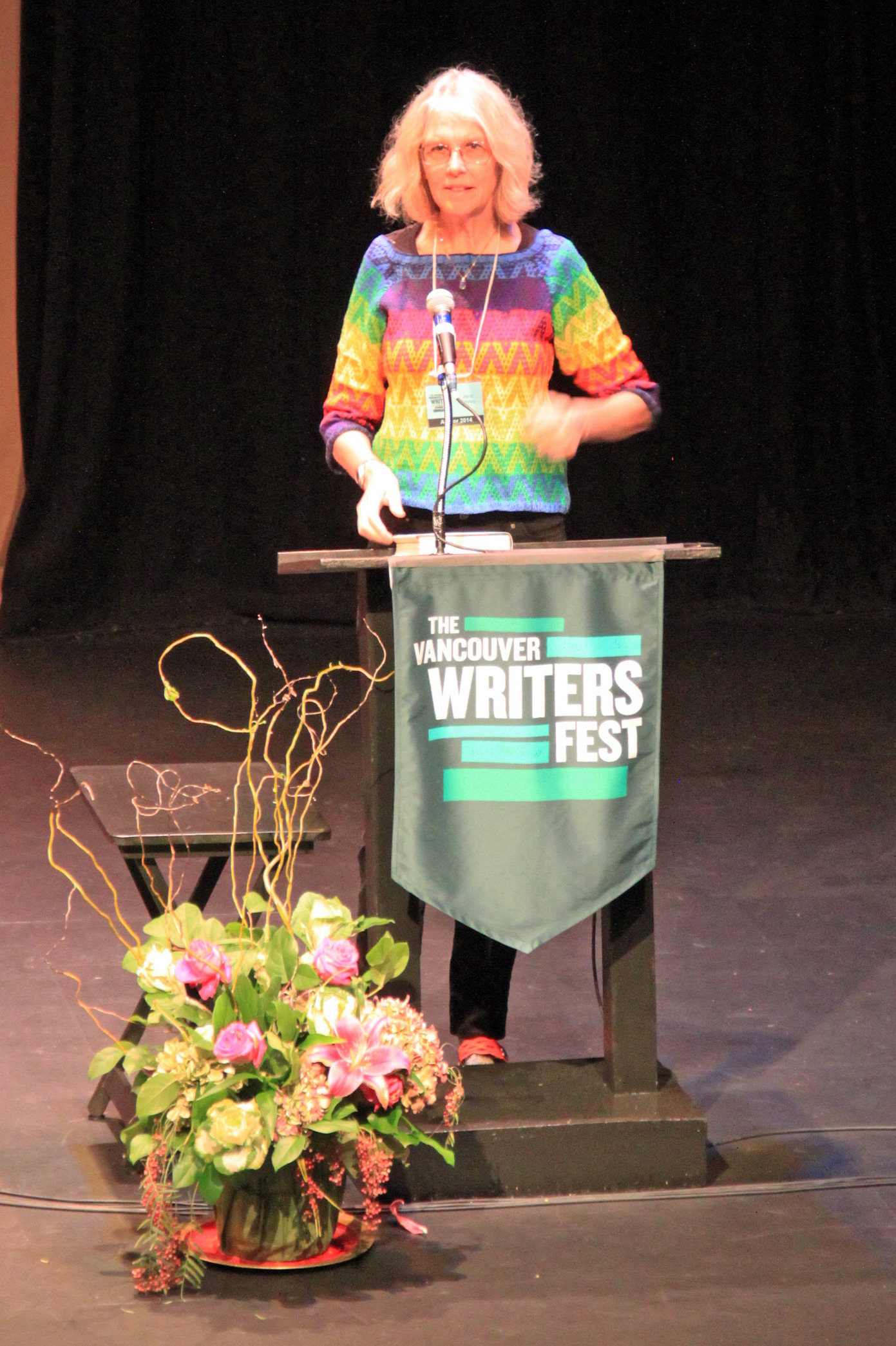
Smiley speaking at the Vancouver Writers Fest on her 2014 novel, Some Luck

Smiley then wrote a trilogy of novels about an Iowa family over the course of generations. The first novel of the trilogy, Some Luck, was published in 2014 by Random House. The second volume followed in the spring of 2015 and the third volume in the fall of 2015.

Smiley's A Year at the Races: Reflections on Horses, Humans, Love, Money, and Luck has been compared to English author Jilly Cooper's 2010 novel Jump!.

== Awards ==
Smiley received the Pulitzer Prize for Fiction in 1992. In 2006, she received the Fitzgerald Award for Achievement in American Literature, which is given annually in Rockville, Maryland, the city where F. Scott Fitzgerald, his wife Zelda and their daughter Frances are buried, as part of the F. Scott Fitzgerald Literary Festival.

== Works ==
=== Novels ===
- Barn Blind (1980)
- At Paradise Gate (1981)
- Duplicate Keys (1984)
- The Greenlanders (1988)
- A Thousand Acres (1991)
- Moo (1995)
- The All-True Travels and Adventures of Lidie Newton (1998)
- Horse Heaven (2000)
- Good Faith (2003)
- Ten Days in the Hills (2007)
- Private Life (2010)
- Some Luck (2014)
- Early Warning (April, 2015)
- Golden Age (October 20, 2015)
- Perestroika in Paris (2020)
- A Dangerous Business (2022)
- Lucky (2024)
- Lidie (2026)

=== Short story collections ===
- The Age of Grief (1987)
- Ordinary Love & Good Will (1989)

=== Non-fiction books ===
- Catskill Crafts (1988)
- Charles Dickens (2003)
- A Year at the Races: Reflections on Horses, Humans, Love, Money, and Luck (2004)
- Thirteen Ways of Looking at the Novel (2005)
- The Man Who Invented the Computer (2010)

=== Young adult novels ===
- The Georges and the Jewels (2009)
- A Good Horse (2010)
- True Blue (2011)
- Pie in the Sky (2012)
- Gee Whiz (2013)
- Riding Lessons (2018)
- Saddles and Secrets (2019)
- Taking the Reins (2020)

=== Children's books ===
- Twenty Yawns (2016)
