= Punk Farm =

2005 book by Jarrett J. Krosoczka

- Cover for Punk Farm
- Author: Jarrett J. Krosoczka
- Cover artist: Jarrett J. Krosoczka
- Language: English
- Genre: Children's literature
- Publisher: Knopf Books for Young Readers
- Publication date: April 26, 2005
- Publication place: United States
- Media type: Print (hardcover)
- Pages: 40
- ISBN: 0-375-82429-4 (hardcover, first edition, Knopf)
- OCLC: 56355962
- Dewey Decimal: [E] 22
- LC Class: PZ7.K935 Pu 2005

Punk Farm is a children's book written and illustrated by Jarrett J. Krosoczka, published on April 26, 2005, by Knopf Books for Young Readers. A sequel book, Punk Farm on Tour, was released on October 9, 2007. A theatrical film adaptation was in the works at DreamWorks Animation, with another attempt from Metro-Goldwyn-Mayer later on.

== Plot introduction ==
Punk Farm tells the story of five farm animals—Sheep (lead vocals), Pig (electric guitar and backing vocals), Goat (electric bass guitar and backing vocals), Chicken (electronic musical keyboards and backing vocals) and Cow (drum kit and backing vocals)—who are an underground punk rock band called "Punk Farm". They perform a punk rock cover of "Old MacDonald Had a Farm" while Farmer Joe is asleep.

== Awards and nominations ==
- The book was one of Child Magazine's "Best Books of the Year" in 2005.
- It was also a Texas 2 by 2 Reading List Book and a Miami Herald "Best Book of the Year"
- It was recommended by NY1, The Boston Globe, the Seattle Post-Intelligencer, The Wichita Eagle, and The Associated Press.
- It received a starred review by Kirkus Reviews.
- Punk Farm has also been nominated for the following state awards:
  - WEMTA Golden Archer Award, Wisconsin's state book award
  - Mitten Award, Michigan's state book award
  - Volunteer State Book Award, Tennessee's state award

== Film adaptations ==
In April 2006, DreamWorks Animation had the rights to develop an animated film adaptation. It would have been produced by Kevin Messick and written by Jim Hecht, both of whom developed its story.

By June 2011, Metro-Goldwyn-Mayer was developing an animated film based on the book. David Silverman, the director of The Simpsons Movie and co-director of Monsters, Inc., was hired to direct the feature and Prana Studios was to handle the animation. As of April 2022, the film remains in development hell.
