= Alma (film) =

- Directed by: Rodrigo Blaas
- Written by: Rodrigo Blaas
- Produced by: Cecile Hokes
- Music by: Mastretta
- Production company: Independent
- Release date: 24 June 2009 (Palm Springs ShortFest)
- Running time: 5:30
- Country: Spain
- Language: None

Alma is a 2009 Spanish animated dark fantasy short film produced by ex-Pixar animator Rodrigo Blaas. It had received notable recognition at the Fantastic Fest awards. The word "alma" in Spanish means "soul".

The film is about a girl named Alma who wanders through the deserted streets of Barcelona and into a mysterious toy store. Curiosity gets the better of her and she suffers an unfortunate fate.

== Summary ==
On a cold day in the quiet streets of Barcelona, a girl named Alma comes wandering down a deserted alleyway, encountering a wall with names of various children, prompting her to write her own name on it. Startled by a noise of mechanical cogs behind her, she turns cautiously around and discovers a doll on display in a shop window that looks identical to her. Curious, she tries to enter the shop only to find that the door is locked. Frustrated, Alma throws a snowball at the door. Thinking that the shop is locked, Alma begins to walk away before the door suddenly opens. Alma looks back and then enters the store.

As Alma walks in, she is presented with shelves filled with numerous dolls. Elated, she notices the doll of herself on a table. Walking towards it, she trips over a small toy of a boy riding a bicycle. She puts the toy upright and it pedals across the floor and heads towards the exit, but the door closes before it could escape. Amused, Alma goes back to grabbing the doll, but she finds that it has disappeared.

Looking around for the doll, Alma realizes that it has moved to the top of a shelf, and she starts to climb it so that she can reach it. The moment Alma touches the doll, she has weird visions and finds herself looking at the shop below from the doll's perspective. Unable to move, Alma notices all of the other dolls staring at her as a different doll is raised in the shop's display window for the specific child to see.

== Proposed film adaptation ==
By October 2010, DreamWorks Animation was developing an animated feature film based on Alma. Short's director Rodrigo Blaas was set to direct the feature, with Guillermo del Toro executive producing it. The studio later hired Megan Holley, a writer of Sunshine Cleaning, to write a script. Del Toro, who was also helping with the story and the design work, said in June 2012 that the film was in visual development.
