= Ryne Douglas Pearson =

American author (born 1964)

- Born: Los Angeles, California, U.S.
- Occupation: Author; screenwriter
- Period: 1993–present

YouTube information
- Channel: Cooking With Ry
- Years active: 2017–present
- Genres: Cooking; Vlog
- Subscribers: 242 thousand
- Views: 38 million
- Last updated: 21 October 2025

Ryne Douglas Pearson is an American author. He is best known for his Art Jefferson novel series, including Simple Simon, which adapted to the 1998 film Mercury Rising starring Bruce Willis and Alec Baldwin. He also co-wrote the screenplay and story for the 2009 film Knowing starring Nicolas Cage.

His YouTube channel "Cooking With Ry" focuses on outdoor cooking, grilling, and barbecue.

== Works ==
=== Novels ===
- Art Jefferson series:
1. Cloudburst, AKA Thunder One (1993)
2. October's Ghost (1995)
3. Capitol Punishment (1995)
4. Simple Simon (1996)
5. Simon Sees (2018)
- Top Ten (1999)
- Confessions (2010)
- All for One (2010)
- The Donzerly Light (2010)
- District One series:
1. Cop Killer (2013)

=== Short story collections ===
- Dark and Darker (2010). Contains 4 short stories:
  - "Beholder"
  - "Creation"
  - "The Key"
  - "Shark"

=== Short stories ===
Uncollected short stories.

- "Get A Good Tree Or Die Trying" (2011)

=== Nonfiction ===
- Do Not Call...or Else (2013)

=== Films ===
- Mercury Rising (1998), based on the 1996 novel Simple Simon
- Knowing (2009), screenplay, story, co-producer
