= The Tibet Code =

- Author: He Ma
- Original title: 藏地密码
- Country: China
- Language: Chinese
- Genre: Fantasy, Mystery, Detective fiction, Conspiracy fiction, Thriller
- Publisher: Chongqing Publishing Group (CN)
- Published: 1 April 2008 – 1 June 2011 (initial publication)
- Media type: Print (paperback)
- No. of books: 10

The Tibet Code is a series of fantasy adventure novels written by He Ma. The novels follow Qiang Ba, an expert on Tibetan Mastiffs, and his mentor Fang Xin, as a mysterious letter pulls them into a convoluted search for a hoard of Buddhist treasure hidden during the persecution of the 9th-century Tibetan emperor Langdarma. Elements of Tibetan culture, geography, and mythology are prominent throughout the story, alongside modern aspects of intrigue and globetrotting.

The series' first two novels were posted online and publication began quickly after an interested publisher bought the rights in 2008. It became an instant success, with the ten novels selling a combined 10 million copies.

A film adaption, co-produced by the newly formed Oriental DreamWorks and China Film Group, was announced, but was cancelled.

== Background ==
He, an ethnic Han Chinese, grew up in ethnically Tibetan Sichuan province and lived for more than a decade in Tibet itself. He developed a love for trekking though the Tibetan landscape, even undertaking a solo trek through the Hoh Xil region (known for being the world's third-least populated area).

He started writing The Tibet Code in 2005 as a short adventure story about the pursuit of a rare breed of Tibetan Mastiff, while still working full-time as a part of a medical staff. But as the plot expanded, he turned to a daily consumption of books and historical texts about Tibet (reading more than 600 books on the subject).

The story was initially posted online and attracted a small readership of about 30,000, until 2008, when it first attracted the attention of publisher Hua Nan. Hua quickly bought the rights and rushed the series to print (some critics, suspicious of such deeply researched material being published so quickly, accused He of "fronting a secret collective of collaborators", which he denied).

The series, initially titled The Last Temple, was rebranded by the publisher as The Tibet Code, in a nod to the bestselling novel The Da Vinci Code.

== Film adaptation ==
In April 2013, DreamWorks Animation announced an adaption of The Tibet Code as the first project of its newly formed Chinese venture, Oriental DreamWorks, in collaboration with China Film Group. DreamWorks Animation CEO Jeffrey Katzenberg described the film as "be[ing] for China, like the Indiana Jones and The Da Vinci Code films" and having "all the makings of a world-class, quality, blockbuster franchise." China Film Group chairman Han Sanping suggested that the film could also "represent traditional Chinese culture and Chinese morality" to the world. In June 2015, Los Angeles Times reported that the film adaptation had been cancelled. According to Katzenberg, his company could not come to terms with the producer who owned the rights to the book.

=== Criticism ===
The announcement of DreamWorks' participation in a film about Tibet, a region often associated in the West with accusations of human rights violations and forced cultural assimilation, was greeted by some critics as pandering to the Chinese government for access to the country's lucrative film market. At the announcement press conference, Katzenberg stressed that "the books themselves are not political. The movie shouldn't be assumed to be controversial and political."
