= Simple Simon (novel) =

1996 novel written by Ryne Douglas Pearson

- Author: Ryne Douglas Pearson
- Language: English
- Series: Art Jefferson
- Genres: Young-adult novel, thriller, mystery, political
- Publication date: 1996
- Publication place: United States
- Pages: 239
- Preceded by: Capitol Punishment

Simple Simon: A Thriller is a 1996 novel written by American author Ryne Douglas Pearson. The novel was adapted into the film Mercury Rising in 1998.

== Plot ==
Arthur “Art” Jefferson has to protect an autistic 16-year-old boy, Simon Lynch, who hacked a government code, from an assassin.

== Film adaptation ==
The novel was adapted to the 1998 film Mercury Rising directed by Harold Becker, and starring Bruce Willis, Alec Baldwin, and Miko Hughes, it was distributed by Universal Pictures.
