= Perestroika in Paris =

2020 novel by Jane Smiley

Peretroika in Paris
- Author: Jane Smiley
- Cover artist: Dmytro Kozlov
- Language: English
- Publisher: Alfred A. Knopf
- Publication date: 2020
- Publication place: United States
- Media type: Print
- Pages: 265
- ISBN: 9780525520351

Perestroika in Paris is a 2020 novel written by Jane Smiley.

== Reception ==
Sam Sacks, in a review published by the Wall Street Journal, praised the novel as a successful combination of "the Parisian fairy tale and the equestrian novel".

== Animated feature film adaptation ==
In April 2021, Barry Sonnenfeld was set to direct the 2d animated film adaptation of the book with Frank Marshall producing.
