= A. Lee Martinez =

American novelist

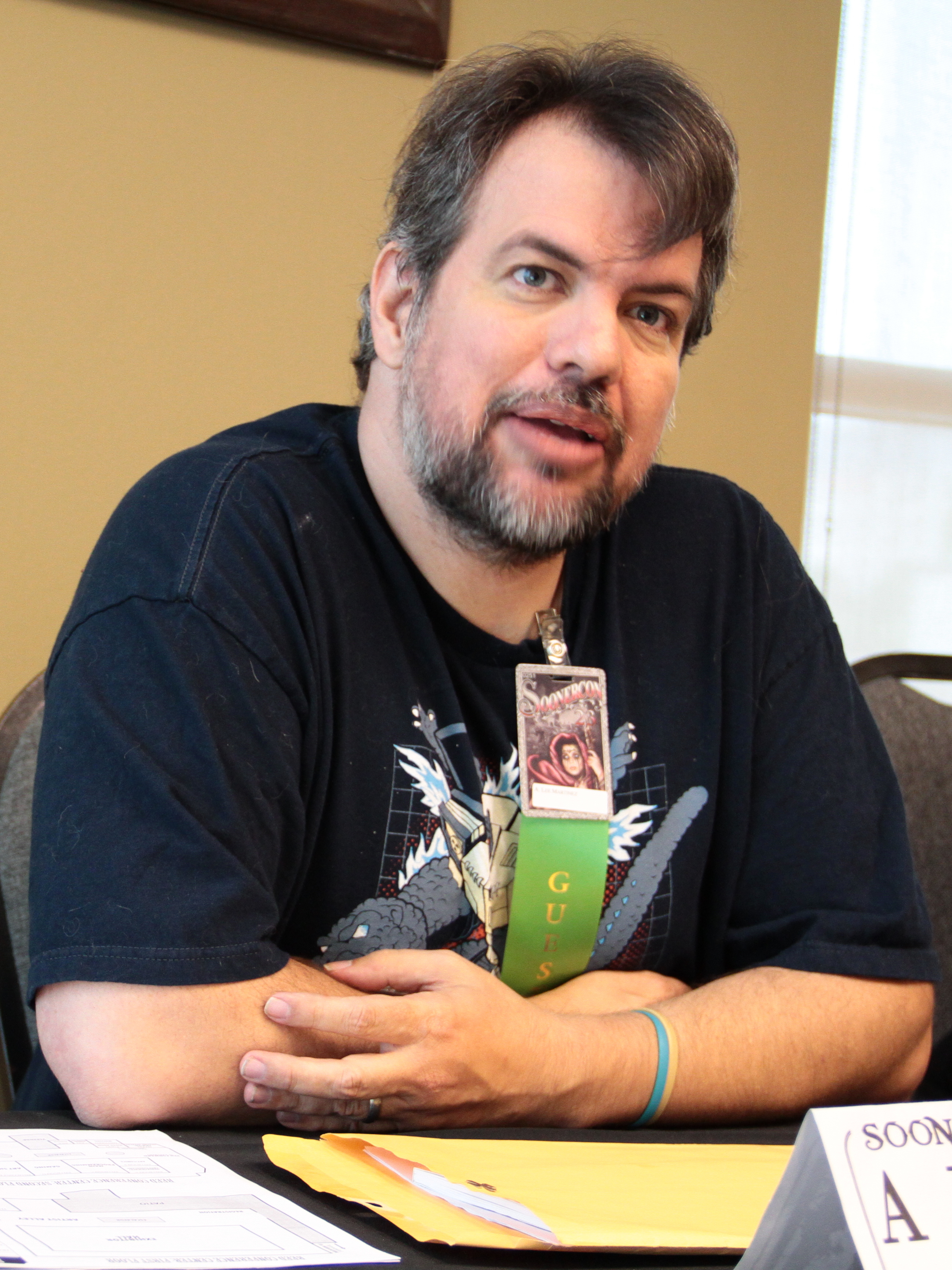
- A. Lee Martinez at the 2014 SoonerCon
- Born: January 12, 1973 (age 53); El Paso, Texas, U.S.
- Occupation: Author
- Writing career
- Genres: Comic fantasy, urban fantasy, science fiction, horror
- Website: www.aleemartinez.com

A. Lee Martinez (born January 12, 1973) is an American fantasy and science fiction author. He has been a member of the DFW Writers' Workshop since 1995. He currently resides in Lewisville, Texas.

== Biography ==
A. Lee Martinez was born in El Paso, Texas on January 12, 1973. In 1991, he started writing when he was around 17 years old and graduated from Gadsden High School in Anthony, New Mexico, northwest of El Paso, just across the state line. He has written fourteen published fantasy novels. His books have been translated into five languages. He has been married to artist and author Sally Hamilton since 2010.

Martinez's first published novel, Gil's All Fright Diner (2005), was awarded a 2006 Alex Award, an award given to ten books written for adults that have special appeal to young adults, ages 12 through 18. Gil's also had a featured review in Publishers Weekly. His fourth novel, The Automatic Detective, also received a featured review in Publishers Weekly.

A. Lee Martinez's other novels are In the Company of Ogres (2006), A Nameless Witch (2007), Too Many Curses (2008), Monster (2009), Divine Misfortune (2010), Chasing the Moon (2011), Emperor Mollusk Versus The Sinister Brain (2012), Helen and Troy's Epic Road Quest (2013), The Last Adventure of Constance Verity (2016), Constance Verity Saves the World (2018), Constance Verity Destroys The Universe (2022), and Unbearable (2026). Except for the Constance Verity series, all novels are stand-alone-books set in individual universes.

In 2013, Martinez self-published a collection of short stories that featured further adventures of characters from his previous novels, entitled Robots Versus Slime Monsters.

Martinez released a three-part short story after the release of Gil’s All Fright Diner titled "Cranky Dead". The short story is based in the town of Rockwood where Gil’s All Fright Diner took place. Registration to the A. Lee Martinez forum is required to access the short story.

In 2019 it was announced that The Last Adventure of Constance Verity would be adapted into a feature motion picture starring Awkwafina from Legendary Entertainment with Atsuko Hirayanagi set to direct.

== Published works ==
=== Novels ===
- Gil's All Fright Diner (2005, ISBN 0-7653-1471-1)
- In the Company of Ogres (2006, ISBN 0-7653-5457-8)
- A Nameless Witch (2007, ISBN 0-7653-1548-3)
- The Automatic Detective (2008, ISBN 0-7653-1834-2)
- Too Many Curses (2008, ISBN 0-7653-1835-0)
- Monster (2009, ISBN 978-0-316-04126-3)
- Divine Misfortune (2010, ISBN 978-0-316-04127-0)
- Chasing The Moon (May 2011, ISBN 978-0-316-09355-2)
- Emperor Mollusk Versus The Sinister Brain (Mar 2012, ISBN 978-0-316-09352-1)
- Helen and Troy's Epic Road Quest (Jul 2013, ISBN 978-0-316-22643-1)
- The Last Adventure of Constance Verity (July 2016, ISBN 978-1481443517)
- Constance Verity Saves the World (July 2018, ISBN 978-1-4814-4354-8)
- Constance Verity Destroys the Universe (March 2022, ISBN 978-1-4814-4357-9)
- Unbearable (September 2026, ISBN 978-1-6680-7345-2)

=== Collections ===
- Robots Versus Slime Monsters (2013, ISBN 978-1-63315-655-5)
- Strange Afterlives Anthology (as editor and contributor, 2015, ISBN 978-1-310-22608-3)

=== Short stories ===
- "Black Magic and Silver Bullets" (1997, A. Lee Martinez' official website) (in 2010 considered a lost story - but since found)
- "Nigh Omnipotent" (1998, A. Lee Martinez' official website) (also once lost)
- "Cranky Dead, Part 1" (September 5, 2006, A. Lee Martinez' official website)
- "Cranky Dead, Part 2" (October 5, 2006, A. Lee Martinez' official website)
- "Cranky Dead, Part 3" (March 3, 2007, A. Lee Martinez' official website)
- "The Hard Holiday" (2007)
- "The Innsmouth Nook" (2010, can be found in Death's Excellent Vacation)
- "The Devil and Danny Webster" (2015, A. Lee Martinez' official website)
