= Soonercon =

Convention

- Status: Active
- Genre: Multigenre
- Venue: Embassy Suites by Hilton Norman Hotel & Convention Center
- Locations: Norman, Oklahoma
- Country: United States
- Inaugurated: 1986
- Organizer: Leonard Bishop
- Website: https://www.soonercon.com

Soonercon is a fan-run multi-genre convention held annually in Central Oklahoma, founded in Oklahoma City proper before being held in Midwest City from 2013 until 2018 and then Norman, Oklahoma in June 2019 at the vastly larger Embassy Suites Hotel & Convention Center.

Soonercon was founded in 1986 by Mike Hodge and Tamara Hodge, but went dormant after the 1997 event. In 2005, a group of fans headed by con chair Jerry Wall re-established Soonercon and worked to a 2007 relaunch event. While originally created as a traditional sci-fi/fantasy "litcon" embracing art, TV/film, costuming, gaming, folksinging, comics and real-space advocacy, Soonercon now crosses over to even more aspects of fandom including anime, miniature modeling, and film production.

As with both the state nickname and the mascot of the University of Oklahoma athletic teams (located in Norman), Soonercon takes its name from the doubly unique angle of Oklahoma Territory's opening-settler "Land Runs" and the Sooners who crossed into the target areas early in several of the runs, illegally ahead of the opening hour.

== Programming ==
Soonercon programming includes featured guests, a large (over 7,200 square feet) dedicated gaming area, demonstrations, exhibitors hall and artist alley, workshops (including a Writer’s Workshop), a dance, art show and auction, a costume contest, and panels for every fandom subject (examples include kid’s programming, art, gaming, cosplay, anime, writing, author readings, and film/tv).

== History ==
First held in June 1986 under founding chair Mike Hodge and mainly sponsored by the STAR OKC SF fan club and other individuals, SoonerCon was Oklahoma City’s fan-based sci-fi convention until SoonerCon 13 in 1997. (SC 1 and 2 were both held in 1986, in order to reset the date from summer to the pre-Thanksgiving weekend in November.) During those years, many headliner artist and writer guests of honor, from Tim Powers and Gene Wolfe to Brad W. Foster and Robin Bailey, were welcomed to Oklahoma City. SC1 was held at the Northwest Hilton, SC2 moved to the recently refurbished Skirvin Plaza downtown. SC3 and for several years then moved to then-named Central Plaza Hotel at Reno and Eastern, and then the downtown Sheraton Century Center.

In 1991, a sister event, ThunderCon, was formed by STAR OKC member Larry Nemecek. ThunderCon was designed to be a local charity "media con" emphasizing much of what SoonerCon did not: genre TV/film, comics, gaming, model-building, anime and pop culture, with actors, designers, and other guests—especially from the Star Trek franchise. ThunderCon drew its name from three local ties: Oklahoma’s notorious spring weather, the mythical thunderbird from Native American heritage, and the same-named bird that was mascot of the state's heroic 45th Infantry Division (aka "Thunderbird Division"). It debuted in June 1991 (balancing SoonerCon’s November setting) and lasted for seven annual editions, often with staff and helpers working on both OKC events. Note that ThunderCon's name preceded by 17 years the coming and similar moniker of the NBA franchise Oklahoma City Thunder—but the team obviously sourced its name from the same Oklahoma roots.

With few exceptions over the years, Infant Crisis Services of Oklahoma City, which assists infants and toddlers of low-income families, was ThunderCon's primary charity of choice (as well as several 1990s editions of SoonerCon).

After the end of the original SoonerCons under STAR OKC in 1997, seven years passed without a local sci-fi convention until a group of fans, with permission from the original founders, returned to the name SoonerCon in 2005 and began working on its resurrection. SoonerCon 2006 was held July 15–16 at the Bricktown Plaza in Oklahoma City, home to several early SoonerCons and Thundercons as the "Central Plaza Hotel," with over 500 paid attendees and $1000 raised for a local charity, Citizens Caring for Children. SoonerCon 2007, now expanded to a three-day event, moved to ThunderCon's old "first June weekend" slot over June 8–10 and moved physically to the westside Biltmore Hotel, where it stayed for several years; guests included Star Trek actors Vaughn Armstrong and Casey Biggs, and native Trek pros Janet and Larry Nemecek. SoonerCon 2008 was held June 6–8 with a theme of "Pieces of '08," with honored guests including toastmaster Selina Rosen, author John Ringo, and artist Tom Kidd.

SoonerCon 2009 was held June 5–7 with featured guests Eric Flint and Selina Rosen; and the theme "Slideways in Time." Then followed "2010: A Bubba Odyssey" with "Bubba Ho-Tep" author guest Joe R. Lansdale, artist GoH John E. Kaufmann, and comic book artist John Lucas—once again with the inimitable Selina Rosen as toastmaster. For 2011, SoonerCon moved downtown June 3–5 to the Sheraton "Century Center" of SoonerCons and ThunderCons of old, switched from a title using years to sequential numbers (at 20), and featured a theme "Heroes & Villains" with author Tim Powers as guest of honor. SoonerCon 21 proclaimed "I'll Be Back to the Future" at the Sheraton June 15–17, 2012 (a time slot shift) with author Eric Flint and Selina Rosen. For SoonerCon 22, the con themed "Beyond Thunderdome" moved just east of downtown to the Reed Conference Center at Rose State College in Midwest City and Sheraton Midwest City, and to end of the month: June 28–30. Those 2013 guests were Oklahoma author C.J. Cherryh as guest of honor, writers workshop leader Tim Powers, artist and comic illustrator Mark Texeira. Ric Meyers—and perennial toastmaster Selina Rosen.

Pending updates to dates, themes and guests, Soonercon continued annually in its June slot at the Reed Center and Sheraton in Midwest City through 2018, when it was realized the large but limited parking lot was actually causing a ceiling on attendees. Growth immediately resumed the next year with a move to the larger Embassy Suites Hotel and Conference Center in Norman on June 7-9 with actor Nana Visitor of Star Trek: DS9 among the guests.

The current string was interrupted by two years postponed during the general COVID-19 pandemic shutdowns, but Soonercon 30 resumed at the Norman Embassy Suites over June 24-26, 2022. The 2023 dates for Soonercon 31 were June 30-July 2; the 32nd was June 21-23, 2024, 33rd was June 20-22, and Soonercon 34 Through Salt & Storm is planned for June 19-21, 2026.
