= The Pig Scrolls =

2004 novel by Paul Shipton

- Cover of the first UK hardcover edition of The Pig Scrolls.
- Author: Paul Shipton
- Cover artist: Sally Taylor
- Language: English
- Genre: Comedy/adventure
- Publisher: Puffin
- Publication date: 25 March 2004
- Publication place: United Kingdom
- Media type: Hardback & paperback
- ISBN: 0-14-138021-7
- Followed by: The Pig Who Saved the World

The Pig Scrolls (2004), by Paul Shipton, is a young adult comedy adventure novel about a talking pig (Gryllus) and his endeavours to save the world. The novel is set in Ancient Greece with many, often comical, references to ancient Greek mythology and life. The characters include all the major Ancient Greek gods, some minor deities, the young Homer and Sibyl, a prophetess in training at the temple of Apollo in Delphi.

== Plot ==
After all the Olympian gods go missing, Sibyl has a premonition in which the sun god Apollo tells her to find "the talking pig". Sibyl then sets out looking for the talking pig, Gryllus. She finds him first at an auction where she buys him for 200 drachmas then Gryllus runs away and he winds up at Big Stavros's Kebab bar where he is forced to entertain customers and where Sibyl takes him back. Together they set off for the temple at Delphi. Apollo informs Sibyl that she and Gryllus must find a goatherd boy living on top of a mountain. Once Sibyl and Gryllus find the goatherd (who turns out to be the god Zeus), they set off once more for Apollo's temple at Delphi. It is there that Gryllus, the talking pig, must save the world from utter destruction.

The author revealed about his work:

"I got the idea for The Pig Scrolls when I was rereading Homer's Odyssey and found myself more interested in some of the non-heroic characters in the background. Working on the book gave me a chance to revisit a world I have always loved—that of ancient mythology and history. And, of course, in order to research the character of Gryllus fully, I was forced to eat a huge number of pies".

The Pig Scrolls is set in Ancient Greece, and is about a pig named Gryllus. Gryllus, who was once a member of captain Odesseus’ famous crew, was transformed into a pig by the enchantress Circe. Gryllus, enjoying his quiet life in the woods is soon captured by local hunters when they realize he can talk, and is soon "rescued" by a junior prophetess in training (Sibyl). Sibyl informs Gryllus of a premonition showing her the end of the world. Gryllus believes her to have lost a couple of marbles and escapes, so Sibyl kidnaps him. On their journey to the temple in Delphi, they encounter monsters, gods, a strange goatherd and a scientist who has invented the awesome Atomos Device. Gryllus comes to realize that the entire universe is in the trotters of one talking pig, himself.

== Sequel ==
The Pig Scrolls is followed by a sequel, The Pig Who Saved the World, which won a Nestle Bronze Award in the UK.

== Film ==
On April 9, 2010, DreamWorks Animation was developing an animated feature film based on The Pig Scrolls, as a possible directing job for Barry Sonnenfeld was tasked to develop the film to direct, while Kirk DeMicco wrote the most recent script revision. DreamWorks Animation had also optioned rights for the book's sequel.
