= A Thousand Acres =

1991 novel by Jane Smiley

- Hardcover first edition cover
- Author: Jane Smiley
- Language: English
- Genre: Domestic Realism
- Publisher: Alfred A. Knopf
- Publication date: October 23, 1991
- Publication place: United States
- Media type: Print (hardback & paperback)
- Pages: 367
- ISBN: 0-394-57773-6
- OCLC: 23941156
- Dewey Decimal: 813/.54 20
- LC Class: PS3569.M39 T47 1991

A Thousand Acres is a 1991 novel by American author Jane Smiley. It won the 1991 National Book Critics Circle Award for Fiction, the 1992 Pulitzer Prize for Fiction, the 1992 Ambassador Book Award for Fiction, and was adapted to a 1997 film. It was premiered as an opera by the Des Moines Metro Opera during their 2022 season.

The novel is a modernized retelling of Shakespeare's King Lear and is set on a thousand-acre (four hundred hectares) farm in Iowa owned by a family of a father and his three daughters. It is told through the point of view of the oldest daughter, Ginny.

== Plot summary ==
Larry Cook is an aging farmer who decides to incorporate his farm, handing complete and joint ownership to his three daughters, Ginny, Rose, and Caroline. When the youngest daughter objects, she is removed from the agreement. This sets off a chain of events that brings dark truths to light and explodes long-suppressed emotions, as the story eventually reveals the long-term sexual abuse of the two eldest daughters that was committed by their father.

The plot also focuses on Ginny's troubled marriage, her difficulties in bearing a child and her relationship with her family.

== Similarities to King Lear ==
There are many similarities between King Lear and A Thousand Acres, including both plot details and character development. For example, some of the names of the main characters in the novel are reminiscent of their Shakespearean counterparts. Larry is Lear, Ginny is Goneril, Rose is Regan, and Caroline is Cordelia. The role of the Cooks' neighbors, Harold Clark and his sons Loren and Jess, also rework the importance of Gloucester, Edgar and Edmund in King Lear.

The novel maintains major themes present in Lear, namely: gender roles, appearances vs. reality, generational conflict, hierarchical structures (the Great chain of being), madness, and the powerful force of nature.

=== Correspondences between the characters in the novel and in the play ===
- Larry Cook = King Lear
- Ginny Cook Smith = Goneril
- Rose Cook Lewis = Regan
- Caroline Cook Rasmussen = Cordelia
- Frank Rasmussen = King of France
- Ty Smith = Duke of Albany
- Pete Lewis = Duke of Cornwall
- Jess Clark = Edmund
- Harold Clark = Earl of Gloucester
- Loren Clark = Edgar
- Ken La Salle = Kent
- Marv Carson (The Fool)
