= Pearl Studio =

Chinese film production company

Shanghai Pearl Studio Film and Television Technology Co., Ltd
- Native name: Pearl 东方梦工厂 (Pearl Dōngfāng mèng gōngchǎng)
- Formerly: Shanghai Oriental DreamWorks Film & Television Technology Co., Ltd. (2012–2018)
- Type: Subsidiary
- Industry: Film industry
- Founded: August 6, 2012; 14 years ago
- Founder: DreamWorks Animation; China Media Capital; Shanghai Media Group; Shanghai Alliance Investment
- Headquarters: Xuhui District, Shanghai, China
- Owner: Chinese Partners (55%, 2012–2018); DreamWorks Animation (45%, 2012–2018)
- Number of employees: 250 (2014)
- Parent: China Media Capital (2018–present)
- Website: www.pearlstudio.com

Shanghai Pearl Studio Film and Television Technology Co., Ltd, doing business as Pearl Studio, formerly known as Oriental DreamWorks, the trade name of Shanghai Oriental DreamWorks Film & Television Technology Co., Ltd., is a Chinese animation film production company owned by CMC Capital Partners. The company was founded as a Chinese-American joint venture in 2012 by DreamWorks Animation and Chinese investment companies. The company mainly produces Chinese-themed animated and live-action films and their derivatives for distribution within China and worldwide. In 2018, CMC (China Media Capital) acquired NBCUniversal's stake in the studio.

== History ==
On February 17, 2012, DreamWorks Animation announced a joint venture with China Media Capital, Shanghai Media Group and Shanghai Alliance Investment to build a Shanghai based family entertainment company named Shanghai Oriental DreamWorks Film & Television Technology Co., Ltd. or Oriental DreamWorks for short. The new venture was expected to develop and produce original Chinese animated and live-action content for distribution within China and worldwide. The company also produces live entertainment content, theme parks, games and consumer products. Oriental DreamWorks, owned 45% by DWA and 55% by the Chinese partners, launched on August 6, 2012, with cash and intellectual capital worth $350 million. To produce animated films, 37 Entertainment, a Chinese animation studio with 175 employees, which had already worked on some of DWA's television productions, has been acquired.

Beside producing its own content, Oriental DreamWorks acts also as a distributor for DWA's productions. Releasing The Croods in 2013, ODW became the first company in 20–30 years that got a license to import Western films.

On November 25, 2015, Peilin Chou was appointed as the head of creative for feature animation at Oriental DreamWorks.

The studio's first animated feature film, Kung Fu Panda 3, was released on January 29, 2016, and was made in co-production with DWA, with 1/3 of the film being produced in China. The studio's first original film, titled Abominable, followed in 2019. On March 15, 2017, it was reported that NBCUniversal would sell off its stake in Oriental DreamWorks for restructuring and possibly face problems with Chinese antitrust investigation.

A film adaption of The Tibet Code, co-produced by China Film Group, was announced, but was cancelled.

On September 26, 2017, Peilin Chou was promoted to the role of Chief Creative Officer.

On February 1, 2018, CMC Capital Partners announced that they have taken the full ownership of Oriental DreamWorks and renamed it as Pearl Studio. Universal Pictures and DreamWorks Animation would still continue to collaborate with Pearl Studio for Abominable in 2019. Frank Zhu was appointed CEO.

On September 29, 2019, it was reported that Abominable grossed $30 million worldwide during its opening weekend.

== Productions ==
=== Feature films ===
==== Production company ====
Title	Release date	Distributor	Co-production with
Kung Fu Panda 3	January 29, 2016	20th Century Fox	DreamWorks Animation; China Film Group Corporation; Zhong Ming You Ying Film
Abominable	September 27, 2019	Universal Pictures	DreamWorks Animation; Zhong Ming You Ying Film
Over the Moon	October 23, 2020	Netflix	Netflix Animation Studios; Glen Keane Productions; Sony Pictures Imageworks
The Monkey King	August 18, 2023	Netflix	Netflix Animation Studios; Star Overseas
All Wishes Come True!	July 24, 2026	Maoyan Pictures	China Film Group

===== In development =====
Title	Notes
Untitled Chinatown Project	
Illumikitty	
Lucky	
Anitya	
Ultraland	
In the Stars	

==== Distributor in China ====
Title	China Release date	Worldwide Distributor	Produced by
The Croods	April 20, 2013	20th Century Fox (Worldwide); CJ Entertainment (South Korea)	DreamWorks Animation
Turbo	September 18, 2013	20th Century Fox (Worldwide); CJ Entertainment (South Korea)	DreamWorks Animation
Mr. Peabody & Sherman	March 28, 2014	20th Century Fox (Worldwide); CJ Entertainment (South Korea)	DreamWorks Animation; Pacific Data Images; Bullwinkle Studios
How To Train Your Dragon 2	August 14, 2014	20th Century Fox (Worldwide); CJ Entertainment (South Korea)	DreamWorks Animation
Penguins of Madagascar	November 14, 2014	20th Century Fox (Worldwide); CJ Entertainment (South Korea)	DreamWorks Animation; Pacific Data Images
Home	April 24, 2015	20th Century Fox (Worldwide); CJ Entertainment (South Korea)	DreamWorks Animation
Trolls	October 28, 2016	20th Century Fox (Worldwide); CJ Entertainment (South Korea)	DreamWorks Animation

==== Additional production work ====
Title	Release date	Distributed by	Produced by
Penguins of Madagascar	November 26, 2014	20th Century Fox	DreamWorks Animation; Pacific Data Images
Home	March 27, 2015	20th Century Fox	DreamWorks Animation

== Dream Center ==
Part of the deal with the Chinese partners was also an entertainment and culture complex called Dream Center. Built in Shanghai with an investment exceeding $2.7 billion, it would feature series of theatres, cinemas, shopping areas, galleries, hotels, restaurants and the world's largest IMAX screen, and was expected to open in 2017 (it was eventually delayed). As of May 2017, the Dream Center is in limbo.

== Notable people ==
- Jackie Chan, Hong Kong actor, director
- Tom McGrath, animator
- Jill Culton, animator
- Audrey Wells, American director

== See also ==
- Pacific Data Images
- DreamWorks Animation
- Kung Fu Panda (franchise)
- Netflix Animation
