= Amazing Audiobooks for Young Adults =

Annual award for YA audiobooks, from U.S. librarians

The American Library Association's Amazing Audiobooks for Young Adults, formerly Selected Audiobooks for Young Adults, is a recommendation list of audiobooks presented yearly by the Young Adult Library Services Association (YALSA) division.

The Young Adult Library Services Association (YALSA) released the first list of Selected Audiobooks for Young Adults in 1999. In 2009, the list was renamed as Amazing Audiobooks for Young Adults.

The list can be used to help young adult readers find suitable audiobooks, which "are an underused treasure in school libraries. Teacher librarians can use them to draw new readers into the library and find new ways to connect with teachers." However, finding quality audiobooks can be difficult as one must consider the audiobook's sound quality, pacing, variety, cultural authenticity, narrators (professional versus volunteer; computer versus human), as well as matching readers' interests, reading ability, the audiobook's length, and more. To help address these challenges, several librarians and organizations recommend parents and teachers use the Amazing Audiobooks for Young Adults list to find audiobooks for young adults.

== Criteria ==
To be eligible for the list, the audiobook "must have been produced or released within the 24 months previous to the list’s release." The audiobooks cover a range of topics and are targeted toward individuals between the ages of 12 and 18. To land a place on the list, audiobooks are judged on the following criteria:

- The audiobooks must appeal to young adults age 12 to 18. This includes book whose text versions may not be suitable to this demographic.
- If the material is adapted, it "must remain true to, expand, or complement the original work"
- The audiobook must effectively use voice, music, sound effects, and/or language
- The audiobook must be appropriate for audio presentation
- The audiobook must have a suitable match between the performer and the text.
- The audiobook must be professionally produced.
- All words within the audiobook must be pronounced correctly.
- The audiobook must be clearly recorded.
- The audiobook must include informative packaging.

== Honorees ==
After honoring select audiobooks, the Young Adult Library Services Association (YALSA) selects ten books every year to be "the best of the best."

American Library Association's Amazing Audiobooks for Young Adults (Top 10 Audiobooks per Year)
| Award Year | Author | Book Title | Reader(s) |
|---|---|---|---|
| 2011 | John Green and David Levithan | Will Grayson, Will Grayson | MacLeod Andrews and Nick Podehl |
| 2011 | LouAnne Johnson | Muchacho | Ozzie Rodriguez |
| 2011 | Kristin Levine | The Best Bad Luck I Ever Had | Kirby Heyborne |
| 2011 | Kekla Magoon | The Rock and the River | Dion Graham |
| 2011 | Melina Marchetta | Finnikin of the Rock | Jeffrey Cummings |
| 2011 | L. A. Meyer | Rapture of the Deep | Katherine Kellgren |
| 2011 | Patrick Ness | The Knife of Never Letting Go | Nick Podehl |
| 2011 | Laini Taylor | Dreamdark Silksinger | Cassandra Campbell |
| 2011 | Sapphire | Precious | Bahni Turpin |
| 2011 | Rita Garcia Williams | One Crazy Summer | Sisi Aisha Johnson |
| 2012 | Georgia Bragg | How They Croaked | L. J. Ganser |
| 2012 | Libba Bray | Beauty Queens | Libba Bray |
| 2012 | Franny Billingsley | Chime | Susan Duerden |
| 2012 | Brent Crawford | Carter’s Big Break | Nick Podehl |
| 2012 | L. A. Meyer | The Wake of the Lorelei Lee | Katherine Kellgren |
| 2012 | Philip Reeve | Fever Crumb | Philip Reeve |
| 2012 | Louise Rennison | Are These My Basoomas I See Before Me? | Stina Nielson |
| 2012 | Andrew Smith | Marbury Lens | Mark Boyett |
| 2012 | Jonathan Stroud | The Ring of Solomon | Simon Jones |
| 2012 | Rick Yancey | The Curse of the Wendigo | Steven Boyer |
| 2013 | Libba Bray | The Diviners | January LaVoy |
| 2013 | Jeff Kinney | Diary of a Wimpy Kid: Cabin Fever | Ramón de Ocampo |
| 2013 | E.M. Kokie | Personal Effects | Nick Podehl |
| 2013 | Niall Leonard | Crusher | Daniel Weyman |
| 2013 | R. J. Palacio | Wonder | Diana Steele, Nick Podehl, and Kate Rudd |
| 2013 | Christopher Paolini | Inheritance | Gerard Doyle |
| 2013 | Melba Pattillo Beals | Warriors Don’t Cry: A Searing Memoir of the Battle to Integrate Little Rock's Central High | Lisa Renee Pitts |
| 2013 | Elizabeth Wein | Code Name Verity | Morven Christie and Lucy Gaskell |
| 2013 | Allan Wolf | The Watch That Ends the Night | Michael Page, Phil Gigante, Christopher Lane, Laurel Merlington, and Angela Dawe |
| 2013 | Rick Yancey | The Isle of Blood | Steven Boyer |
| 2014 | Paolo Bacigalupi | Zombie Baseball Beatdown | Sunil Malhotra |
| 2014 | Gail Carriger | Etiquette & Espionage | Moira Quirk |
| 2014 | Ian Doescher | William Shakespeare's Star Wars | Full cast |
| 2014 | Sara Farizan | If You Could Be Mine | Negin Farsad |
| 2014 | Daniel Kraus | Scowler | Kirby Heyborne |
| 2014 | Leon Leyson | The Boy on the Wooden Box | Danny Burstein |
| 2014 | L.A. Meyer | Viva Jacquelina!: Being an Account of the Further Adventures of Jacky Faber, Over the Hills and Far Away | Katherine Kellgren |
| 2014 | DC Pierson | Crap Kingdom | DC Pierson |
| 2014 | Terry Pratchett | Dodger | Stephen Briggs |
| 2014 | Rainbow Rowell | Eleanor & Park | Rebecca Lowman and Sunil Malhotra |
| 2015 | Gail Carriger | Curtsies and Conspiracies | Moira Quirk |
| 2015 | Ava Dellaira | Love Letters to the Dead | Julia Whelan |
| 2015 | Ian Doescher | William Shakespeare’s Star Wars Collection | Danny Davis, Jonathan Davis, Ian Doescher, Jeff Gurner, January LaVoy, and Marc Thompson |
| 2015 | Sally Green | Half Bad | Carl Prekopp |
| 2015 | Geoff Herbach | Fat Boy vs. the Cheerleaders | Nick Podehl |
| 2015 | Carl Hiaasen | Skink – No Surrender | Kirby Heyborne |
| 2015 | A. S. King | Glory O’Brien’s History of the Future | Christine Lakin |
| 2015 | Emma Pass | ACID | Fiona Hardingham with Nicholas Guy Smith and Suzan Crowley |
| 2015 | Julie Anne Peters | Define Normal | Christine Lakin |
| 2015 | Deborah Wiles | Revolution | Stacey Aswad and Francois Battiste with J.D. Jackson and Robin Miles |
| 2016 | Libba Bray | Lair of Dreams | January LaVoy |
| 2016 | Gail Carriger | Waistcoats & Weaponry | Moira Quirk |
| 2016 | Sally Green | Half Wild | Carl Prekopp and Kyla Garcia |
| 2016 | Amie Kaufman and Jay Kristoff | lluminae | Olivia Taylor Dudley, Lincoln Hoppe, and Johnathan McClain |
| 2016 | Dawn Kurtagich | The Dead House | Charlotte Parry and Christian Coulson |
| 2016 | Pam Munoz Ryan | Echo | Mark Bramhall, David De Vries, MacLeod Andrews, and Rebecca Soler |
| 2016 | Randall Munroe | What If? Serious Scientific Answers to Absurd Hypothetical Questions | Wil Wheaton |
| 2016 | Isabel Quintero | Gabi, a Girl in Pieces | Kyla Garcia |
| 2016 | Ransom Riggs | Library of Souls | Kirby Heyborne |
| 2016 | Guillermo del Toro and Daniel Kraus | Trollhunters | Kirby Heyborne |
| 2017 | April Genevieve Tucholke | Wink Poppy Midnight | Michael Crouch, Alicyn Packard, and Caitlin Davies |
| 2017 | Ellen Hopkins | Traffick | Kirby Heyborne, Julia Whelan, Madeleine Maby, Rebekkah Ross, and Jacques Roy |
| 2017 | E.K. Johnston | Star Wars: Ahsoka | Ashley Eckstein |
| 2017 | Amie Kaufman and Jay Kristoff | Gemina | Carla Corvo, MacLeod Andrews, Steve West, and a full cast |
| 2017 | Goldy Moldavsky | Kill the Boy Band | Barrett Wilbert Weed |
| 2017 | Gavriel Savit | Anna and the Swallow Man | Allan Corduner |
| 2017 | Brie Spangler | Beast | Andrew Eiden |
| 2017 | Gary D. Schmidt | Orbiting Jupiter | Christopher Gebauer |
| 2017 | Ruta Sepetys | Salt to the Sea | Jorjeana Marie, Will Damron, Cassandra Morris, and Michael Crouch |
| 2017 | ND Stevenson | Nimona | Marc Thompson, Rebecca Soler, January LaVoy, Peter Bradbury, Jonathan Davis, David Pittu, and Natalie Gold |
| 2018 | Benjamin Alire Sáenz | The Inexplicable Logic of My Life | Robbie Daymond |
| 2018 | Lynda Blackmon Lowery, as told to Elspeth Leacock and Susan Buckley | Turning 15 on the Road to Freedom: My Story of the 1965 Selma Voting Rights March | Damaras Obi |
| 2018 | Mackenzi Lee | The Gentleman’s Guide to Vice and Virtue | Christian Coulson |
| 2018 | J.K. Rowling and Newt Scamander | Fantastic Beasts and Where to Find Them | Eddie Redmayne |
| 2018 | Ellen Oh (editor) | Flying Lessons and Other Stories | Various |
| 2018 | Neal Shusterman | Scythe | Greg Tremblay |
| 2018 | Angie Thomas | The Hate U Give | Bahni Turpin |
| 2018 | Maggie Thrash | Honor Girl | Ensemble Cast |
| 2018 | Elizabeth Wein | The Pearl Thief | Maggie Service |
| 2018 | Nicola Yoon | The Sun Is Also a Star | Dominic Hoffman, Raymond Lee, and Bahni Turpin |
| 2019 | Elizabeth Acevedo | The Poet X | Elizabeth Acevedo |
| 2019 | M. T. Anderson and Eugene Yelchin | The Assassination of Brangwain Spurge | Gildart Jackson |
| 2019 | Gayle Forman | I Have Lost My Way | Nicole Lewis, Michael Crouch, and Sunil Malhotra |
| 2019 | Nnedi Okorafor | Akata Witch | Yetide Badaki |
| 2019 | Jason Reynolds | Lu | Guy Lockard |
| 2019 | Jason Reynolds | Sunny | Guy Lockard |
| 2019 | J.K. Rowling and Kennilworthy Whisp | Quidditch Through the Ages | Andrew Lincoln |
| 2019 | Neal Shusterman | Thunderhead | Greg Trembley |
| 2019 | Courtney Summers | Sadie | Rebecca Soler, Fred Berman, Dan Bittner, Gabra Zackman, and a full cast |
| 2019 | Tara Westover | Educated | Julia Whelan |
| 2020 | Elizabeth Acevedo | With the Fire on High | Elizabeth Acevedo |
| 2020 | Samira Ahmed | Internment | Soneela Nankani |
| 2020 | Laurie Halse Anderson | Shout | Laurie Halse Anderson |
| 2020 | Tiffany D. Jackson | Let Me Hear a Rhyme | Adenrele Ojo, Korey Jackson, Adam Lazarre-White, and Nile Bullock |
| 2020 | A. S. King | Dig | A.S. King, Mike Chamberlain, Tonya Cornelisse and Kirby Heyborne |
| 2020 | Jarrett J. Krosoczka | Hey Kiddo | Jarrett J. Krosoczka, Jeanne Birdsall, Richard Ferrone, and Jenna Lamia |
| 2020 | Mindy McGinnis | Heroine | Brittany Pressley |
| 2020 | Michelle Obama | Becoming | Michelle Obama |
| 2020 | Ruta Sepetys | The Fountains of Silence | Maite Jáuregui with Richard Ferrone, Neil Hellegers, Joshua Kane, Liza Kaplan, and Oliver Wyman |
| 2020 | Angie Thomas | On the Come Up | Bahni Turpin |
| 2021 | Elizabeth Acevedo | Clap When You Land | Melania-Luisa Marte and Elizabeth Acevedo |
| 2021 | Traci Chee | We Are Not Free | Scott Keiji Takeda, Dan Woren, Ryan Potter, Ali Fumiko, Sophie Oda, Andrew Kishino, Christopher Naoki Lee, Grace Rolek, Erika Aishii, Brittany Ishibashi, Kurt Sanchez Kanazawa and Terry Kitagawa |
| 2021 | Tracy Deonn | Legendborn | Joniece Abbott-Pratt |
| 2021 | Jordan Ifueko | Raybearer | Joniece Abbott-Pratt |
| 2021 | Holly Jackson | A Good Girl's Guide to Murder | Bailey Carr, Melissa Calin, Michael Crouch, Gopal Divan, Robert Fass, Kevin R. Free, Sean Patrick Hopkins, Carol Monda, Patricia Santomasso, Shezi Sardar and Amanda Thickpenny |
| 2021 | Victoria Jamieson and Omar Mohamed | When Stars Are Scattered | Full cast |
| 2021 | Jason Reynolds and Ibram X. Kendi | Stamped: Racism, Antiracism, and You | Jason Reynolds and Ibram X. Kendi |
| 2021 | Aiden Thomas | Cemetery Boys | Avi Roque |
| 2021 | Deborah Wiles | Kent State | Christopher Gebauer, Lauren Ezzo, Christina Delaine, Johnny Heller, Roger Wayne, Korey Jackson, and David de Vries |
| 2021 | Allan Wolf | The Snow Fell Three Graves Deep: Voices from the Donner Party | Bahni Turpin, Whitney Dykhouse, Teri Schnaubelt, Tim Gerard Reynolds, Lauren Ezzo, Eric G. Dove, Ramón de Ocampo, and Shaun Taylor-Corbett |
| 2022 | Angeline Boulley | Firekeeper’s Daughter | Isabella Star LeBlanc |
| 2022 | Mahogany L. Browne | Chlorine Sky | Mahogany L. Browne |
| 2022 | Eric Gansworth | Apple: Skin to the Core | Eric Gansworth |
| 2022 | Pamela N. Harris | When You Look Like Us | Preston Butler, III |
| 2022 | Stephan Lee | K-Pop Confidential | Joy Osmanski |
| 2022 | Malinda Lo | Last Night at the Telegraph Club | Emily Woo Zeller |
| 2022 | Andrew Maraniss | Singled Out: The True Story of Glenn Burke | Kevin R. |
| 2022 | Neal Shusterman | Game Changer | Andrew Eiden and Jennifer Jill Araya |
| 2022 | Angie Thomas | Concrete Rose | Dion Graham |
| 2022 | Raquel Vasquez Gilliland | How Moon Fuentez Fell in Love with the Universe | Kyla Garcia |
| 2023 | Olivia Abtahi | Azar on Fire | Alex McKenn |
| 2023 | Kwame Alexander | The Door of No Return | Kobna Holdbrook-Smith |
| 2023 | Natasha Bowen | Skin of the Sea | Yetide Badaki |
| 2023 | Mahogany L. Browne | Vinyl Moon | Bahni Turpin |
| 2023 | Joanna Ho | The Silence That Binds Us | Raechel Wong |
| 2023 | Tiffany D. Jackson | The Weight of Blood | Full cast |
| 2023 | Ryan La Sala | The Honeys | Pete Cross |
| 2023 | Jason Reynolds | Ain't Burned All the Bright | Jason Reynolds and cast |
| 2023 | Sabaa Tahir | All My Rage | Full cast |
| 2023 | Aiden Thomas | The Sunbearer Trials | André Santana |
| 2024 | Becky Albertalli | Imogen, Obviously | Caitlin Kinnunen |
| 2024 | Isaac Blum | The Life and Crimes of Hoodie Rosen | Josh Bloomberg |
| 2024 | Angeline Boulley | Warrior Girl Unearthed | Isabella Star LaBlanc |
| 2024 | Nick Brooks | Promise Boys | Full cast |
| 2024 | Jas Hammonds | We Deserve Monuments | Tamika Katon-Donegal |
| 2024 | Ali Hazelwood | Check and Mate | Karissa Vacker |
| 2024 | Malia Maunakea | Lei and the Fire Goddess | Jennifer Robideau |
| 2024 | E. L. Shen | The Queens of New York | Full cast |
| 2024 | Claire Swinarski | What Happened to Rachel Riley? | Full cast |
| 2024 | Xiran Jay Zhao | Zachary Ying and the Dragon Emperor | Eric Yang |
| 2025 | Candace Fleming | The Enigma Girls: How Ten Teenagers Broke Ciphers, Kept Secrets, and Helped Win World War II | Moira Quirk |
| 2025 | Cynthia Hand, Brodi Ashton, and Jodi Meadows | My Salty Mary | Nneka Okoye |
| 2025 | Chaz Hayden | Diet Soda Club | Michael Crouch |
| 2025 | A. S. King | Pick the Lock | Max Meyers, Jorjeana Marie, and A. S. King |
| 2025 | TJ Klune | Somewhere Beyond the Sea | Daniel Henning |
| 2025 | Jennifer D. Lyle | Swarm | Krystal Hammond |
| 2025 | Gabe Cole Novoa | The Diablo’s Curse | Vico Ortiz |
| 2025 | Randy Ribay | Everything We Never Had | Ramón de Ocampo, Jesse Inocalla, Manny Jacinto, and JB Tadena |
| 2025 | Soyoung Park, trans. by Joungmin Lee Comfort | Snowglobe | Shannon Tyo, Greta Jung, and Jeena Yi |
| 2025 | Jason Reynolds | Twenty-Four Seconds From Now…: A LOVE Story | Guy Lockard |
| 2026 | Ryan La Sala | The Dead of Summer | Pete Cross, A'rese Emokpae, and Ryan La Sala |
| 2026 | Tony Keith Jr. | Knucklehead: Poems | Tony Keith Jr. |
| 2026 | Amber McBride | The Leaving Room | Amber McBride |
| 2026 | Cynthia Leitich Smith, Kate Hart, Eric Gansworth, Marcella Bell, Darcie Little Badger, Karina Iceberg, Kaua Mahoe Adams, Cheryl Isaacs, Andrea L. Rogers, Christine Hartman Derr, Brian Young, K. A. Cobell, Jen Ferguson, A. J. Eversole, Byron Graves, Angeline Boulley, and David A. Robertson | Legendary Frybread Drive-In: Intertribal Stories | Katie Anvil Rich, DeLanna Studi, Shaun Taylor-Corbett, Darrell Dennis, Elva Guerra, Erin Tripp, and Jordan Waunch |
| 2026 | Jason Reynolds | Soundtrack | Full cast |
| 2026 | Jasminne Mendez | The Story of My Anger | Jasminne Mendez , full cast |
| 2026 | Leah Johnson and George M. Johnson | There's Always Next Year | Eric Lockley and Khaya Fraites |
| 2026 | Alex L. Combs and Andrew Eakett | Trans History: From Ancient Times to the Present Day | Alex L. Combs, Andrew Eakett, and full cast |
| 2026 | Libba Bray | Under the Same Stars | January LaVoy, Jeremy Carlisle Parker, and Major Curda |
| 2026 | Rex Ogle | When We Ride | Ramón de Ocampo |
