= Julia Whelan =

American actress and author (born 1984)

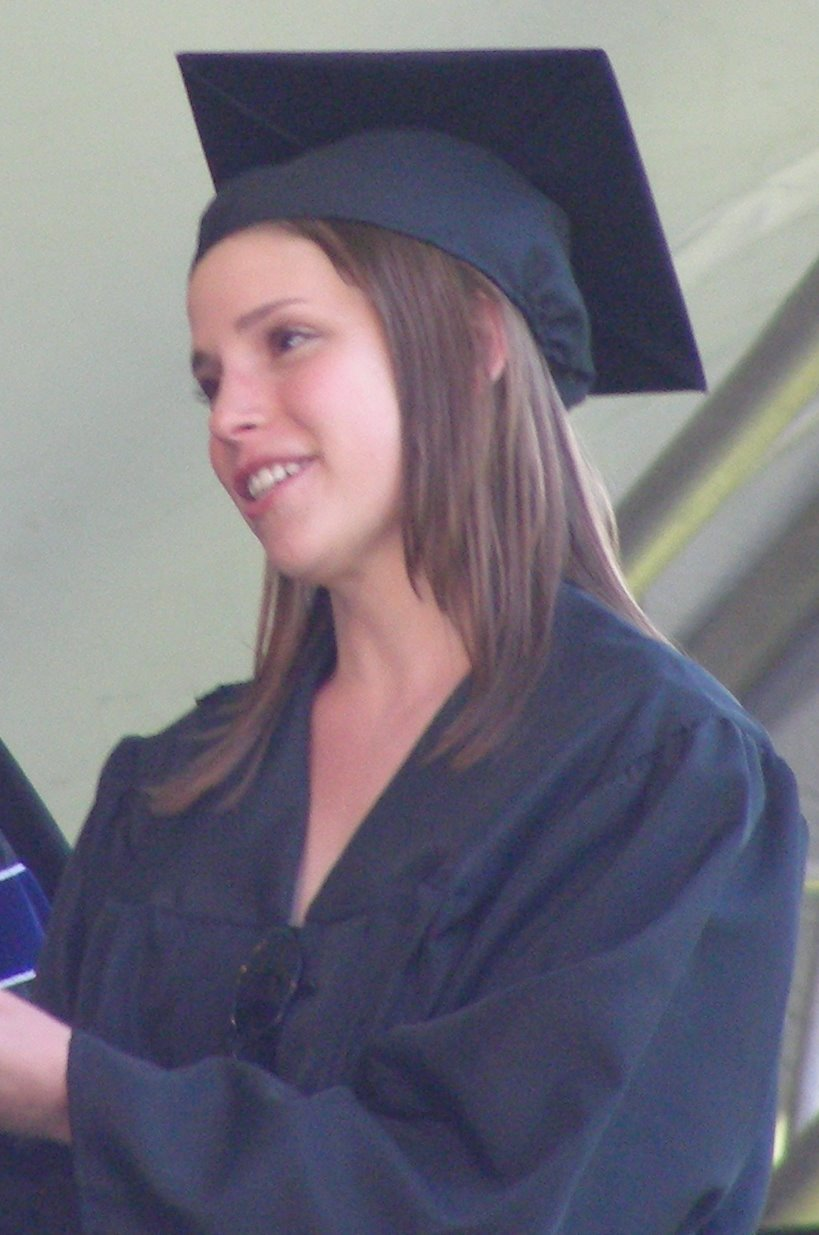
- Julia Whelan receiving her Bachelor of Arts degree at the 2008 Middlebury College Commencement
- Born: Julia May Whelan; May 8, 1984 (age 42); Oregon, United States
- Occupations: Actress; narrator; author
- Years active: 1996–present
- Awards: Young Artist Award for Best Ensemble in a TV Series (drama or comedy) (2001) for Once and Again

Julia May Whelan (born May 8, 1984) is an American actress, narrator and author. As an actress, she is best known for her role as Grace Manning on the television family drama series Once and Again (1999–2002), and her co-starring role in the 2002 Lifetime movie The Secret Life of Zoey. A noted child actor, Whelan first appeared on screen at the age of 11 and continued to take television roles until her matriculation into Middlebury College in 2004; Whelan graduated magna cum laude from Middlebury in 2008 after spending the 2006–2007 academic year as a visiting student at Lincoln College, Oxford. Whelan returned to film acting in November 2008 with a role in the fantasy thriller Fading of the Cries. In the 2010s, Whelan stepped away from her acting career to become an audiobook narrator. As of August 2025, she has narrated over 600 audiobooks. In 2018, she published her debut novel My Oxford Year.

== Early life ==
Julia May Whelan was born in Oregon on May 8, 1984. Her father was a firefighter and her mother a teacher. Whelan first acted in community theater at the age of five, and yearly trips to the Oregon Shakespeare Festival in Ashland, Oregon deepened her interest in an acting career. At age ten she began acting lessons with actor/screenwriter Geof Prysirr. They developed a close relationship, and eventually Prysirr became her guardian, escorting her on trips to Los Angeles, where she soon found professional success.

Whelan moved to Los Angeles with Prysirr and his wife, Days of Our Lives actress Derya Ruggles, so that Whelan could advance her career. Her first TV role was in an April 8, 1996, episode of the drama series Nowhere Man.

== Early acting career ==
Whelan was first introduced to a broader audience in the 1998 TV movie Fifteen and Pregnant as the younger sister of Kirsten Dunst, who portrayed the movie's pregnant protagonist. In 1999 Whelan landed the role for which she is still best known, playing insecure teenager Grace Manning on the family drama Once and Again. The cast included Sela Ward and Billy Campbell as single parents trying to nurture a romance and eventually build a blended family together.

Once and Again was noted for the high quality of its actors, particularly the younger cast members, who were praised for their sensitive performances; they were given screen time commensurate with that of the adult leads. Whelan, Meredith Deane, Shane West, and Evan Rachel Wood played the children of Ward and Campbell, respectively; Mischa Barton joined the show in its final season as Evan Rachel Wood's girlfriend. This lesbian storyline was dovetailed with an equally controversial plot involving Whelan's character in a doomed romance with her high school drama teacher "Mr. Dmitri", played by Eric Stoltz. Whelan, Deane, and Wood were recognized for their performances in April 2001, winning that year's Young Artist Award (from Young Artist Association) for Best Ensemble in a TV Series (Drama or Comedy); Whelan was nominated individually in March 2000 for Best Performance in a TV Drama Series – Supporting Young Actress.

After Once and Again wrapped up its three-year run, Whelan co-starred in the 2002 Lifetime Television movie, The Secret Life of Zoey, as a model student struggling with a prescription drug addiction. Mia Farrow portrayed her mother and Andrew McCarthy was her rehab counselor. The movie was promoted alongside Lifetime TV rebroadcasts of Once and Again. Whelan continued to take television roles through 2004, when she enrolled in Middlebury College.

Whelan spent the 2006–2007 academic year as a visiting student at Lincoln College, Oxford.

== Audiobook narration ==
Whelan has won acclaim for her narration of many audiobooks, including Gillian Flynn's 2012 thriller Gone Girl (co-read with Kirby Heyborne), Nora Roberts' The Witness, for which she won Best Romance at the 2013 Audie Awards, and Tara Westover's Educated, for which she won Best Female Narrator in 2019 at the same awards. Whelan also narrated the award-winning novel My Year of Rest and Relaxation by Ottessa Moshfegh, the New York Times bestseller Evvie Drake Starts Over by Linda Holmes, and her own novel, My Oxford Year.

As of July 2022, Whelan had narrated more than 400 audiobooks, as well as articles for New York, The New Yorker and other magazines.

Whelan also narrates long-form nonfiction journalism, including articles from The New Yorker, The Atlantic, ProPublica, and Vanity Fair.

In 2024, Whelan started the audiobook publisher and distributor Audiobrary.

== Author ==
In 2018, Whelan published her debut novel, My Oxford Year, which Entertainment Weekly called "a breathtakingly perfect picture of Oxford" and "a powerfully heartbreaking and life-affirming tribute to love and to choice". In 2022, she released her sophomore novel, Thank You for Listening.

== Adaptation ==
In 2024, filming began on an adaptation of the film My Oxford Year for Netflix.

== Filmography ==
Year	Title	Role	Notes
1996	Nowhere Man	Young Laura	Episode: "Through a Lens Darkly"
1996	Christmas Every Day	Jacey Jackson	Television film
1998	Fifteen and Pregnant	Rachel Spangler	Television film
1998	Promised Land	Mazie Andrus	Episode: "On My Honor"
1998	ER	Laura	Episode: "The Miracle Worker"
1999–2002	Once and Again	Grace Manning	Main Role
2002	The Secret Life of Zoey	Zoey Carter	Television film
2004	Dr. Vegas	Claire	Episode: "Advantage Play"
2004	Clubhouse	Maggie Archer	Episode: "Spectator Interference"
2011	Fading of the Cries	Emily	Television film
2011	NCIS: Los Angeles	Karen Davis	Episode: "Greed"
2012	The Confession	Alyson	Television film
2012	The Closer	Natalie Gilbert	Episode: "Hostile Witness"
2012	Castle	Tina Massey	Episode: "Pandora"
2017	NCIS	Greta Fensternacht	Episode: "Pandora's Box (Part 1)"

== Bibliography ==
- — (2018). My Oxford Year. New York: William Morrow Paperbacks. ISBN 978-0-06-274064-9. LCCN 2018275169. OCLC 995335673.
- — (2022). Thank You for Listening. New York: Avon. ISBN 978-0-06-324315-6. LCCN 2023276406. OCLC 1337056302.

== Awards and honors ==
AudioFile has named Whelan a Golden Voice narrator.

=== Awards ===
Year	Title	Award	Result	Ref.
2013	The Witness by Nora Roberts	Audie Award for Romance	Winner	
2015	The Impossible Knife of Memory by Laurie Halse Anderson	Audie Award for Teens	Finalist	
2015	Love Letters to the Dead (2014) by Ava Dellaira	Amazing Audiobooks for Young Adults	Top 10	
2015	The Sixteenth of June by Maya Lang	Audie Award for Multi-Voiced Performance	Finalist	
2015	Until the End of the World by Sarah Lyons Fleming	Audie Award for Solo Narration – Female	Finalist	
2017	Traffick by Ellen Hopkins	Amazing Audiobooks for Young Adults	Top 10	
2018	Good Behavior by Blake Crouch	Audie Award for Short Stories or Collections	Finalist	
2018	The Seven Husbands of Evelyn Hugo by Taylor Jenkins Reid	Audie Award for Multi-Voiced Performance	Finalist	
2019	Educated by Tara Westover	Amazing Audiobooks for Young Adults	Top 10	
2019	Educated by Tara Westover	Audie Award for Autobiography or Memoir	Winner	
2019	Educated by Tara Westover	Audie Award for Best Female Narrator	Winner	
2019	Far from the Tree (2012)	Audie Award for Young Adult Title	Finalist	
2019	The Great Alone (2018) by Kristin Hannah	Audie Award for Fiction	Finalist	
2020	Birthday Suit by Lauren Blakely	Audie Award for Audio Drama	Finalist	
2020	Charlotte's Web (1952) by E. B. White	Audie Award for Middle Grade Title	Winner	
2020	Charlotte's Web (1952) by E. B. White	Audie Award for Audiobook of the Year	Finalist	
2020	Evidence of the Affair by Taylor Jenkins Reid	Audie Award for Short Stories or Collections	Finalist	
2021	The Invisible Life of Addie LaRue (2020) by V. E. Schwab	Audie Award for Fantasy	Finalist	
2022	The Four Winds by Kristin Hannah	Audie Award for Best Female Narrator	Finalist	
2022	The Four Winds by Kristin Hannah	Audie Award for Fiction	Finalist	

=== "Best of" lists ===
Year	Title	List	Ref.
2010	The Sky Is Everywhere by Jandy Nelson	AudioFile Best Young Adult	
2012	The Grimm Legacy	AudioFile Best Young Adult	
2012	Magisterium	AudioFile Best Young Adult	
2012	The Sky Is Everywhere by Jandy Nelson	Amazing Audiobooks for Young Adults	
2012	Zombies v. Unicorns edited by Holly Black and Justine Larbalestier	Amazing Audiobooks for Young Adults	
2013	In the After	AudioFile Best Young Adult	
2013	The Witness by Nora Roberts	AudioFile Best Romantic Fiction	
2014	Flat-Out Love by Jessica Park	Amazing Audiobooks for Young Adults	
2014	I'll Give You the Sun by Jandy Nelson	AudioFile Best Young Adult	
2014	The Impossible Knife of Memory by Laurie Halse Anderson	AudioFile Best Young Adult	
2014	Team Human by Justine Larbalesti & Sarah Rees Brennan	Amazing Audiobooks for Young Adults	
2014	We Are The Goldens	AudioFile Best Young Adult	
2015	The Impossible Knife of Memor by Laurie Halse Anderson	Amazing Audiobooks for Young Adults	
2015	Princess of Thorns	AudioFile' Best Young Adult	
2016	Girl In Pieces	AudioFile' Best Young Adult	
2016	Slasher Girls and Monster Boys by April Genevieve Tucholke	Amazing Audiobooks for Young Adults	
2017	Flying Lessons and Other Stories	AudioFile Best Children & Family Listening	
2017	Highly Illogical Behavior by John Corey Whaley	Amazing Audiobooks for Young Adults	
2018	Educated by Tara Westover	AudioFile' Best Memoir	
2018	A Million Junes by Emily Henry	Amazing Audiobooks for Young Adults	
2018	The Purloining of Prince Oleomargarine by Mark Twain and others	Notable Children's Recordings	
2019	Daisy Jones & The Six	AudioFile Best Fiction, Poetry, & Drama	
2019	Educated by Tara Westover	RUSA Listen List	
2019	A Heart in a Body in the World by Deb Caletti	Amazing Audiobooks for Young Adults	
2021	People We Meet On Vacation (2020) by Emily Henry	AudioFile Best Romance	
2022	The Cousins by Karen M. McManus	Amazing Audiobooks for Young Adults	
