= Christopher Lane =

Christopher Lane may refer to:

- Christopher Lane (novelist), American author
- Christopher J. Lane, British-American medical writer, researcher, and intellectual historian
- Christopher M. Lane, member of the Massachusetts Senate
- Chris Lane, American country music singer and songwriter
