= The Wednesday Wars =

2007 young adult novel by Gary D. Schmidt

- Hardcover dust jacket (2007)
- Author: Gary D. Schmidt
- Cover artist: Jonathan Gray
- Language: English
- Genre: Historical Fiction, Children's Literature
- Publisher: Houghton Mifflin Harcourt
- Publication date: May 21, 2007
- Media type: Print (Hardback & Paperback)
- ISBN: 0-618-72483-4
- OCLC: 71044136
- LC Class: PZ7.S3527 We 2007
- Followed by: Okay for Now

The Wednesday Wars is a 2007 young adult historical fiction novel written by Gary D. Schmidt, the author of Lizzie Bright and the Buckminster Boy. The novel is set in suburban Long Island during the 1967–68 school year. The Vietnam War is an important backdrop for the novel. It was given a Newbery Honor medal in 2008, and was also nominated for the Rebecca Caudill Young Reader's Book Award in 2010.

== Plot ==
Holling Hoodhood is a seventh grader during the 1967–1968 school year. In his school, the student body is largely divided between Catholics and Jews, and every Wednesday both groups go to their separate churches for religious classes. Holling, a Presbyterian, has no religious class to attend, therefore he is forced to remain at class with his teacher, Mrs. Baker.

Holling is convinced that Mrs. Baker resents him for this. This suspicion is compounded when she begins having him read Shakespeare. As he begins to enjoy the plays, though, he also begins to understand Mrs. Baker, whose husband, he learns, is stationed in Vietnam.

The story's main focus is on Holling's struggle to get out from his overbearing and somewhat abusive father's shadow. Mr. Hoodhood is an ambitious, narcissistic, social climbing, and at times, cutthroat architect who is determined that Holling should take over the business when he retires. In fact, Mr. Hoodhood believes that nothing is more important than their family business and ensuring that it flourishes. Because of this, all of the Hoodhoods must be on their best behavior at all times. Whenever Holling brings up a particular person, his father breaks down who the person is, as well as their status; if they're someone who owns a business, Mr. Hoodhood demands Holling to be respectful at all times. This causes a strained relationship between Holling and his father. Holling ultimately finds an ally in his older sister, Heather, and eventually comes to understand that Mrs. Baker is also trying to help him learn to be his own person.

Other subplots in the story include: Holling entering cross country; running the big race for track; going on his first date with classmate Meryl Lee Kowalski, whose father is of the other architecture firm in town, Kowalski and Associates; his sister Heather running away to California with her boyfriend; and the ever-present shadow of the Vietnam War — as well as other historical events, such as the shootings of Robert F. Kennedy and Martin Luther King Jr. In addition, television news anchorman Walter Cronkite is mentioned throughout the novel, as an important presence while delivering the news. Cronkite is presented as the voice of the people, with the ability to sway Americans to a particular side.

The plot follows a steady, progression-focused format, lacking any clear climax. Instead, it simply follows Holling as he struggles through school, forms friends out of supposed enemies, and tries to grow up.

== Connections to Schmidt's other novels ==
Characters from The Wednesday Wars have appeared in Schmidt's other novels.

The novel Okay for Now features Holling's friend and classmate Doug Swieteck as the main character. Holling appears in the first chapter of the novel to say goodbye to Doug, who is about to move. Several times, the novel refers back to a scene from The Wednesday Wars, in which Doug meets Joe Pepitone.

Lucas Swieteck, Doug's older brother, appears as Jack and Joseph's gym coach in Orbiting Jupiter, set many years later.

Just Like That, released in January 2021, features Meryl Lee Kowalski as its main character. In this book, it is mentioned that Holling Hoodhood was killed in a car accident on the way to see a movie.

The Labors of Hercules Beal is also set many years later. Holling's friend Danny Hupfer is the titular Hercules' teacher.

== Publication history ==
- — (May 21, 2007). The Wednesday Wars (1st, hc ed.). Houghton Mifflin Harcourt. ISBN 978-0-618-72483-3.
- — (May 18, 2009). The Wednesday Wars (1st, pb ed.). Houghton Mifflin Harcourt. ISBN 978-0-547-23760-2.
- — (2007). The Wednesday Wars (eBook ed.). Houghton Mifflin Harcourt. ISBN 978-0-547-34624-3.

== Other adaptations ==
The Wednesday Wars was adapted into a play by Kirsten Kelly in 2011. It was performed at Calvin University, where Gary D. Schmidt works as a teacher, by the Calvin Theater Company.

== Critical reception ==
Kirkus Reviews called the novel "another virtuoso turn by the author of Lizzie Bright and the Buckminster Boy (2005)" in its starred review. Susan Faust, reviewing for the San Francisco Chronicle, wrote it was a "graceful novel [...] full of goodwill, yearning and heart". In the New York Times, Tanya Lee Stone called The Wednesday Wars "one of my favorite books of the year" and compliments Schmidt on creating a novel that resonates with adults and children alike.

=== Awards ===
- 2008 Newbery Honor
- 2010 Rebecca Caudill (nominated)
