= Naomi McDougall Jones =

American actress, writer and producer

- Born: 19 May 1987 (age 39); Colorado, United States
- Occupations: Writer, Actress and Producer
- Years active: 2006–present

Naomi McDougall Jones is an American actress, writer and producer.

She is best known for her work on films Bite Me (2019 film), Imagine I'm Beautiful, The New Yorker Presents and more.

== Life and career ==
Naomi grew up in Aspen, Colorado. She studied acting at Cornell University and graduated from the American Academy of Dramatic Arts.

Naomi wrote, produced, and starred for Imagine I'm Beautiful, directed by Meredith Edwards. She won The Don Award for Best Independently Produced Screenplay at the Cape Fear Independent Film Festival and Special Jury Award for Best Performance at the Arizona International Film Festival in 2014. She is a vocal advocate and activist for bringing gender parity to film, both on and off screen. In 2016, Naomi gave a TED Talk on the subject at TEDxBeaconStreet.

Naomi served as a writer on Amazon's original series, The New Yorker Presents, which premiered at Sundance 2016. She wrote and produced the 2019 feature film Bite Me, also directed by Meredith Edwards, in which she co-stars alongside Christian Coulson, Naomi Grossman and Annie Golden. Bite Me is a subversive romantic comedy about a real-life vampire and the IRS agent who audits her. In the spirit of transparent filmmaking, Naomi created the Fear(ful)less: Filmmaking from the Edge podcast to document the process of making Bite Me from pre-production through post-production. The film premiered at Cinequest, won Best Feature Film at VTXIFF, and was then self-distributed online with partner Seed & Spark and across the United States on the Joyful Vampire Tour of America, a 51-screening, 40-city, three-month release roadshow that incorporated the film, live Q&As with the cast and creative team, and "Joyful Vampire Ball" parties. The entire tour was filmed by documentary filmmaker Kiwi Callahan for a YouTube docu-series with each episode released week-by-week during the tour. The release strategy behind the Joyful Vampire Tour of America was intended by Naomi and producing partner Sarah Wharton to be a case study for improving the indie film distribution landscape, to create a more economically sustainable ecosystem.

She is currently at work on a book, The Wrong Kind of Women: Inside Our Revolution to Dismantle the Gods of Hollywood, which will be published by Beacon Press on February 4, 2020. Inspired by the TED Talk, The Wrong Kind of Woman examines the systemic exclusion of women in film—an industry with massive cultural influence—and how, in response, women are making space in cinema for their voices to be heard.

She is also at work on her third feature screenplay, Hammond Castle, a magical realism film that explores themes of identity, legacy and gender through a modern-day seven-month pregnant woman's unexpected interaction with the brilliant, eccentric and deceased inventor John Hays Hammond, Jr. For the screenplay, Naomi became the first recipient of the artist-in-residency program at Ernest Hemingway House, author Ernest Hemingway's final home in Sun Valley, Idaho.

== Filmography ==
Year	Film	Role	Notes
2006	The World's Astonishing News	Joanna	TV series
2010	Out of Focus	Kate Henderson	Feature Film
2011	Blood Moon	Claire	Short Film
2011	The Path of Avarice	Mariah	Short Film
2011	Boardwalk Empire	Screaming Secretary	TV series
2011	The Night Before She Walked Down the Aisle	Naomi	Feature Film
2011	Friday		Short Film
2011	Come Home Raquel	Nina	Feature Film
2012	Stunods	Emily	TV series
2012	The Perfect Secret	Cecilia	Short Film
2012	Like Ingrid Bergman	Taylor	Short Film
2014	Indigo	Lizzy	Feature Film
2014	Imagine I'm Beautiful	Lana	Feature Film
2016	'79 Parts	Andrea	Feature Film
2017	Woman	Woman 6	Short Film
2019	Nothing About Chloe	Chloe	Feature Film
2019	Bite Me	Sarah	Feature Film

As writer

- Imagine I'm Beautiful (2014)
- The New Yorker Presents (2016)
- Bite Me (2019)

As producer

- Imagine I'm Beautiful (2014)
- The Seal (2019)
- Bite Me (2019)
