= The Dead House =

2015 young adult thriller novel by Dawn Kurtagich

- First edition UK cover
- Author: Dawn Kurtagich
- Audio read by: Charlotte Parry; Christian Coulson
- Language: English
- Genre: Young adult non-fiction, thriller, horror
- Published: 2015
- Publisher: Little, Brown Books for Young Readers (UK, US)
- Media type: Print, e-book, audiobook
- Pages: 432 pages
- ISBN: 0316298689

The Dead House is a 2015 young adult novel and the debut novel of Dawn Kurtagich. The book was published in paperback in the United Kingdom on 6 August and 15 September 2015 by Orion Publishing and in hardcover in the United States on 15 September 2015 by Little, Brown Books for Young Readers. It is told through a mixture of medias such as diary entries, news clippings, video footage, and various interviews.

== Synopsis ==
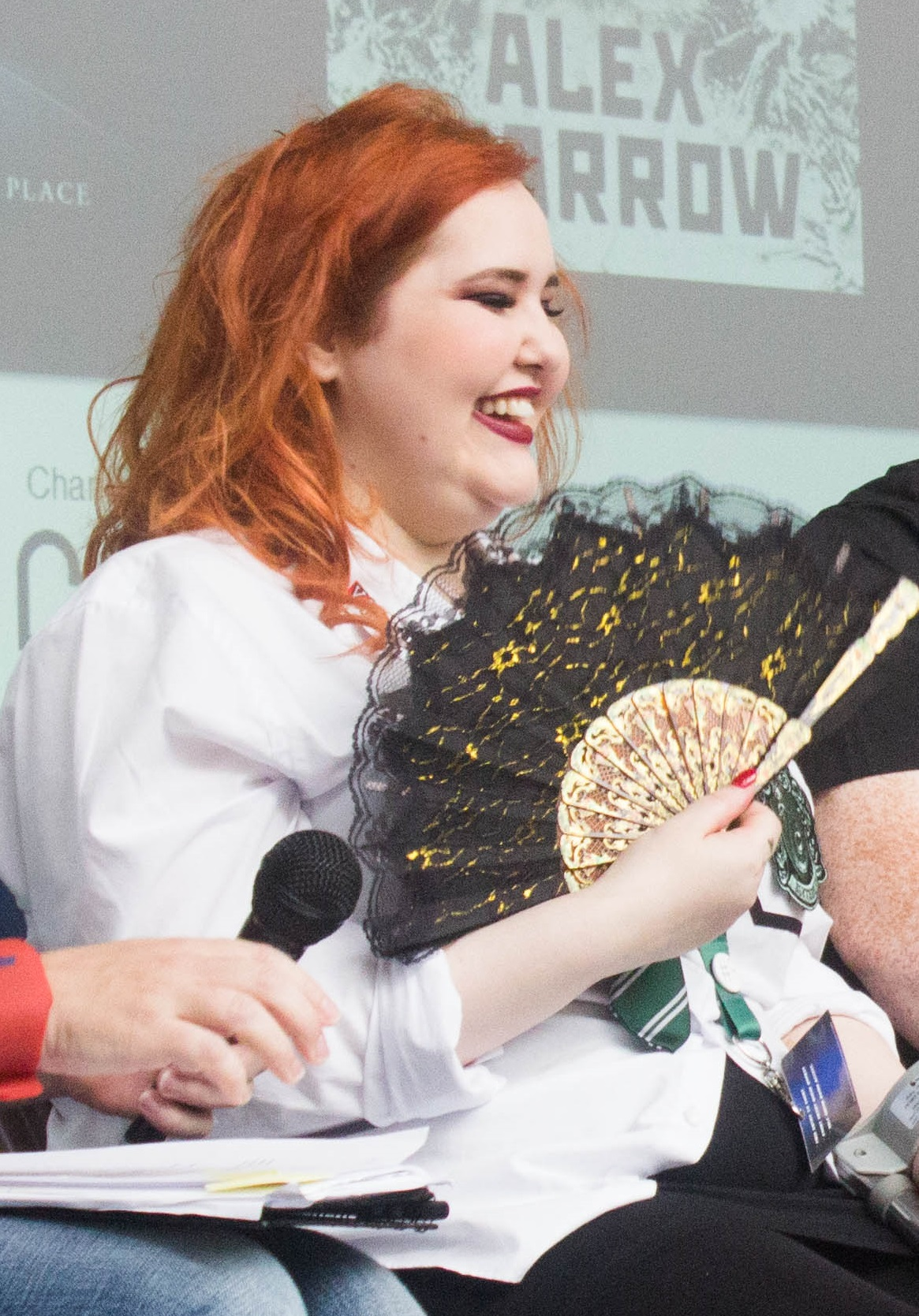
Kurtagich in 2016

At the beginning of the novel, the reader is made aware that the book's content was compiled from several sources, including a diary that was found in the remains of Elmbridge High School, a British high school that burned down 25 years prior. The material is a mixture of video clips, interviews, recovered diary entries, Post-it Notes, and other similar items, and will also occasionally have notations about missing content. Throughout the book, Kaitlyn repeatedly refers to her diary as "Dee" in her entries.

Carly and Kaitlyn Johnson are two personalities that exist in the same body. They've been living in a mental hospital named Claydon Mental Hospital for an undisclosed amount of time. She works directly with a therapist named Dr. Annabeth Lansing, and it is established that Kaitlyn/Carly's parents died in a horrific accident that they cannot remember. They are aware of each other's existence, but they never directly interact as Carly is only active during the day and Kaitlyn at night, although they do communicate through various means, which they attempt to hide from others. In the mental hospital, Dr. Lansing diagnoses them as having dissociative identity disorder, an eating disorder (Carly), self-harming (Kaitlyn), and hearing voices (Kaitlyn, who hears the voice of a demonic entity known as Aka Manah). Dr. Lansing also believes that Kaitlyn is not the true personality and that Carly created her as a coping mechanism, although Kaitlyn insists that she is real and existed before their parents' deaths.

Carly/Kaitlyn is sent to Elmbridge where Carly makes friends with a spiritual girl named Naida. Naida believes that both personalities are real and that they're two souls in one body. As the semester progresses, Kaitlyn uses an attic in an abandoned building as a refuge and meets Ari, with whom she reluctantly falls in love. Her peace is short-lived as Kaitlyn begins to see visions of a menacing dead girl and becomes stressed when she cannot see her little sister Jaimie, who was placed into foster care. Things come to a head when Carly stops emerging, provoking Kaitlyn into attempting suicide, which sends her back to the mental institution. Their therapist is surprised since she assumed that Carly was the dominant personality, but assumes that this is a sign of both personalities merging. During this time she comes back into contact with her friend John, who she hasn't seen since her parents' accident. Naida asks Kaitlyn to break herself out of the hospital, fearing that a Shyan, a dark magic user, is after Kaitlyn/Carly because of the power held by dual souls.

Once escaped, Naida hides Kaitlyn in the school basement and reveals Kaitlyn's location - and the secret of the dual souls - to their friends, who are surprised and skeptical but supportive. As Kaitlyn hides she continues to experience more terrifying supernatural phenomena, prompting her and Naida to travel to London to see her brother Haji, a powerful dark magician that gives them some information about their situation. Naida believes that Kaitlyn has been possessed by an evil spirit and ultimately decides to hold a ritual to travel into her mind, into the dead house itself. Sometime after entering the house she and Kaitlyn are attacked by the evil spirit. This abruptly ends the ritual and for some unknown reason Naida immediately cuts off her tongue.

Naida's brother Haji decides to re-do Naida's ritual and Kaitlyn, Haji, Brett, John, and Naida's boyfriend Scott travel into her mind. Once there Haji discovers that Shyan is one of Kaitlyn's friends. Kaitlyn also begins to fear her friend John for reasons she cannot explain. Diary entry from Carly is inserted into the book about this time that shows that she was also afraid of one of the people around her, a boy named Brett that had a crush on Carly, unaware that the personality he had met was Kaitlyn. After the ritual Kaitlyn is approached by John, who reveals that he wants her to go back to the asylum and that her parents died in a car accident, as her father had been distracted while arguing with Kaitlyn, and that after the accident she told John (who had also been in the car) that the accident was the happiest day of her life. Kaitlyn also tries to discover the Shyan's identity via a charm supplied by Haji. She had suspected Brett after reading a diary entry where he tried to force himself on Carly, but when his dead body is found her suspicions turn to John. That night Kaitlyn accidentally kills John while trying to break up a fight between him and Ari. Though saddened by John's death, Kaitlyn notices that things appear to be calming down. She also realizes that the dead girl she had been seeing was trying to assist her rather than menace her. Kaitlyn also believes that she has a way to reunite herself with Carly and resolves to find her regardless of the cost.

The book then cuts to an undated diary entry where it's revealed that John was not the Shyan - rather it was Ari, who did everything because he believed that Carly and the others were holding Kaitlyn back from her true life. He also tells her that he was not responsible for everything that has been happening and that the demon possessing her was summoned by Carly. Ari furthermore tells Kaitlyn that she was responsible for the murder of a missing girl committed while the demon was in control. (Naida later insists to a detective that Ari killed the girl as a sacrifice to bargain with the demon.) The book then shows Kaitlyn writing to Dee that Ari cannot hurt them, insinuating that she has killed him. Kaitlyn then realizes that the demon in her is evil and will continue to harm more people. As a result, she commits suicide by self-immolation, resulting in the school burning down. The book ends with Carly/Kaitlyn's therapist, whose license has been revoked and is now a paranormal researcher, appears on a paranormal radio show to deny claims that the book's events were supernatural despite multiple disappearances at the school site and the authorities' inability to locate Carly/Kaitlyn's body.

== Reception ==
Critical reception for The Dead House has been mostly positive and the novel has received mixed praise for its portrayal of mental illness. Publishers Weekly and the School Library Journal both gave mostly positive reviews, with the School Library Journal calling the novel "A worthy addition to high school horror collections". Publishers Weekly wrote that "Contrived tension and a haphazard time line ring a few discordant notes, but are balanced by insightful characterization and a detailed exploration of the importance of the emergent identity to the teenage self." SciFiNow was mixed, as they felt that "As a literary experiment, it's interesting; as a story, it's too depressing to enjoy." The audiobook version, performed by Charlotte Parry and Christian Coulson, won an AudioFile Earphones Award.
