= Orbiting Jupiter =

2015 young adult novel by Gary D. Schmidt

Orbiting Jupiter!
- Orbiting Jupiter By Gary D. Schmidt
- Author: Gary D. Schmidt
- Cover artist: Carmen Spitznagel/Trevillion Images (photographer); Sharismar Rodriguez (design)
- Language: English
- Genre: Young adult fiction
- Publisher: Houghton Mifflin Harcourt
- Publication date: October 6, 2015
- Media type: Print (hardback & paperback)
- Pages: 183
- ISBN: 978-0-544-46222-9
- OCLC: 948287511
- LC Class: PZ7.S3527 Or 2015

Orbiting Jupiter is a 2015 young adult fiction novel written by Gary D. Schmidt, the author of Lizzie Bright and the Buckminster Boy and Okay for Now. The novel focuses on a Maine family as they begin fostering a teenage father.

== Synopsis ==
The book is told from the view of Jackson (Jack) Hurd, a twelve-year-old boy living with his parents on an organic farm when his family begins fostering fourteen-year-old Joseph Brook. Joseph's caseworker, Mrs. Stroud, informs the family that he recently spent a month incarcerated at a place called Stone Mountain for trying to kill his teacher while high on pills and also that he has a three-month-old daughter whom he has never met. Joseph arrives at the farm two days later and closes himself off to the Hurds. Later, the school bus driver hassles Joseph for having a child so young. He refuses to board the bus, and he and Jack instead walk to school in the cold. This becomes a daily ritual despite the frigid winter. At school, Joseph receives little sympathy, but is liked by a few of his teachers. One day, his biological father shows up at the farm without warning while Joseph is in counseling and demands to see him, but Mr. Hurd sends him away.

One day on their way to school, Joseph walks down to the Alliance River and steps onto the ice despite Jack's warnings and tries to break it. He briefly stops when Jack yells the name "Maddie", which he has heard Joseph say in his sleep, before giving up and walking back to Jack. However, he falls through the ice a few steps from the shore. Jack is able to pull him out and they return home. Jack later asks Joseph why he went onto the ice, to which he responds, "Maddie liked to skate." After the incident, Mr. Hurd orders them to start riding the bus again. On the bus, Jack is harassed by several other students who tell him Joseph got into a fight with Jay Perkins, another eighth-grader.

Once the ice is thick enough, the family goes ice skating for the first time in the season. Joseph, in a moment of vulnerability, asks the Hurds to help him find his daughter and tells them the story of how she was born. When he was thirteen, Joseph fell in love with Madeleine Joyce, the young daughter of wealthy lawyers, whom he met when his plumber father had a job at their house. Joseph and Madeleine secretly spent the summer together before she went away to preparatory school. He visited her when she came home for Christmas break and she kissed him for the first time. The day before she was to leave again, Madeleine's nanny caught them sleeping together and her parents filed a restraining order against Joseph. Months later, Madeleine died from complications giving birth to their daughter Jupiter (named after their favorite planet), and Joseph was forced to sign away his parental rights under threat of prosecution from the Joyces. Shortly after this, he took unmarked yellow pills from a classmate and assaulted a teacher, for which he was sent to Stone Mountain.

A few days later, Joseph is violently attacked in school by Jay Perkins and two other eighth-graders, but is defended by Jack. Joseph and the other students are all suspended for four days, but Jack's father commends him for defending Joseph. On Christmas, the Hurds attend church, where Joseph relates to the story of Mary and Joseph. When they get home, Jack's parents promise Joseph they will help him see Jupiter.

The Hurds attempt to arrange a meeting between Joseph and Jupiter, but to no avail. Joseph's father, having managed to attain visitation rights, shows up at the farm again and indicates that he has abused his son in the past. Mrs. Stroud says that since Joseph is a minor, his father claims he actually has the parental rights to Jupiter and now is refusing to give them up unless he receives money from the Joyces. Joseph's father tells him the only reason the Hurds are fostering him is for the money, but Mr. Hurd says all the money they are receiving is going towards a college fund in Joseph's name.

After weeks of waiting, Joseph is still unable to see Jupiter in spite of support from the Hurds and his teachers, only learning that she is staying with a foster family in Brunswick. Impatient, he runs away from home. The Hurds realize he has gone to find Jupiter. They drive to Brunswick to look for Joseph and split up. Jack enters a library to ask if they have seen Joseph and soon realizes the librarian there is Jupiter's foster mother. The librarian receives a call from her husband, who says a teenager (Joseph) is loitering outside of their house. Jack and the librarian drive back to her house, where she gives Joseph a new picture of Jupiter, promising to remain in contact with him. Jack's parents arrive and they all return to Eastham.

True to her word, Jupiter's foster mother sends weekly letters to Joseph updating him on his daughter's growth. He finally begins to settle into his new home and school. One day in February his father, having finally been paid by the Joyces and given up his rights to Jupiter, shows up at the farm and takes Joseph away at gunpoint. Jack's father calls the police. They later learn that Joseph's father, speeding, drove his truck off the Alliance Bridge and into the river, killing himself and Joseph. Joseph's funeral is held a few days later at the church where he spent Christmas, and is attended by the Hurds, Jupiter's foster mother, Joseph's teachers, and several of his and Jack's classmates.

On what would have been Joseph's sixteenth birthday, Mrs. Stroud returns to the Hurd farm and drops off a toddler-age Jupiter, who is now their adopted daughter. Jack shows Jupiter around the farm before picking her up and carrying her into the house.

== Development ==
The farm owned by the Hurds is based on a real organic farm in East Sumner, Maine, that welcomes foster children and encourages them to develop self-responsible habits. Schmidt based the character of Joseph on a boy he met while visiting a juvenile detention facility. He described the writing process as starting by listening for a narrator, which he found in Jack: "Sometimes it takes longest of all, but it’s everything. So I found this naïve 12-year-old who would grow throughout the book and has questions he’s beginning to ask for the first time. That voice, once it was there…then the book wasn’t too hard to write."

=== Publication history ===
- — (October 6, 2015). Orbiting Jupiter (1st, hc ed.). Houghton Mifflin Harcourt. ISBN 978-0-544-46222-9. Archived from the original on May 14, 2018.
- — (2015). Orbiting Jupiter (eBook ed.). Houghton Mifflin Harcourt. ISBN 978-0-544-46264-9.
- — (December 2015). Orbiting Jupiter (1st UK ed.). Andersen Press. ISBN 978-1783443949.

== Characters ==
- Key children
  - Joseph Brook – 14-year-old father, served time in Stone Mountain after his conviction for assaulting a teacher. Fostered by the Hurd family.
  - Jackson (Jack) Hurd – 12-year-old child, the narrator
  - Madeleine Joyce – 13-year-old (when she met Joseph) mother of Jupiter, attended school in Andover. Both of her parents were lawyers so she spent a lot of time by herself.
  - Jupiter Joyce – daughter of Joseph and Madeline
- Adults
  - Mr. Brook – Joseph's father
  - Mr. and Mrs. Hurd – Jackson's parents and foster parents to other children
  - Mrs. Stroud – Social worker
- Hurd farm animals
  - Dahlia – Cow
  - Quintus Sertorius – Horse
  - Rosie – Joseph's favourite cow
- Eastham Middle School adults
  - Mr. Canton – Vice-dean
  - Mr. Collum – 8th-grade science teacher
  - Mr. D'Ulney – 6th/7th/8th-grade mathematics (pre-algebra) teacher
  - Mrs. Halloway – 6th-grade language arts teacher
  - Mr. Haskell – Bus driver
  - Mr. Oates – 6th-grade social studies teacher
  - Coach Swieteck – Physical education. "Coach had lost both his legs to a land mine in Vietnam a long time ago", matching the description of Doug Swieteck's oldest brother Lucas in Schmidt's previous novel Okay for Now.
- Eastham Middle School students
  - Brian Boss – 8th-grade bully
  - Ernie Hupfer – 6th-grade rider of Haskell's bus
  - Danny Nations – 6th-grade rider of Haskell's bus
  - Jay Perkins – 8th-grade bully
  - Nick Porter – 8th-grade bully
  - John Wall – 6th-grade rider of Haskell's bus

== Reception ==
Publishers Weekly and Kirkus Reviews both gave the novel starred reviews. Jeff Giles, reviewing for The New York Times, called the novel warm and reassuring "though it has its share of tragedy."

=== Awards and honors ===
Orbiting Jupiter was placed on the longlist for the Carnegie Medal in 2017.

Winner of the 2018 Young Hoosier Book Award (Middle Grade).

Best Children's Book of the Year (2016) by the Children's Book Committee of Bank Street College of Education.

== See also ==
- Jupiter Rising (by Gary D. Schmidt, 2024), sequel
