= Kristin Levine =

American author

- Born: April 22, 1974 (age 52)
- Education: Swarthmore College
- Occupation: Novelist
- Children: 2

Kristin Sims Levine (born April 22,1974) is an American novelist who authored The Lions of Little Rock, a New-York Historical Society Children's History Book Prize winner. It is a fictional story about friendship based around true historical events of the Little Rock Nine in Little Rock, Arkansas. In September 2019, it was announced that rights to Lions was optioned for development of a featured film. Levine has written other historical fictional books, The Best Bad Luck I Ever Had and The Paper Cowboy, which take place during the United States' entry into World War I and McCarthyism era America of the 1950s, respectively. Levine's most recent book, The Jigsaw Jungle, is about a daughter who discovers a family secret. Levine currently lives in Alexandria, Virginia with her two daughters.

== Life and career ==
Levine graduated from Swarthmore College in 1997 with a degree in German. She then worked as an au pair in Vienna, Austria. Later, she became a professor of screenwriting at American University in Washington, DC. Today, Levine continues to reside in Alexandria with her two daughters.

== Publications ==
=== The Best Bad Luck I Ever Had ===
The Best Bad Luck I Ever Had was published in 2009 by Puffin Books.

The novel was originally written as a screenplay. After rejections by various studios due to the cost of producing a period movie with children, Levine turned it into a novel. The story was inspired by her paternal grandfather's childhood in rural Alabama in 1917. The novel tells a story of a friendship between a white farm boy and an African-American city girl during a time when such friendships were not allowed by racist societal norms.

The Best Bad Luck I Ever Had received the following accolades:

- 2010: American Library Association's (ALA) Best Books for Young Adults
- 2010: ALA's Top Ten Amazing Audiobooks for Young Adults

=== The Lions of Little Rock ===
The Lions of Little Rock was published in 2012 by Penguin Young Readers Group.

The novel was inspired by her mother's childhood in Little Rock, Arkansas. It tells a story of a friendship between two little girls whose friendship is made difficult because of racism in a post-segregation South. The girls are caught up in the inflamed racial divide the year after the Arkansas National Guard is called in to escort a group of nine black students, the Little Rock Nine, into a formerly all-white Central High School in Little Rock, Arkansas.

The Lions of Little Rock received the following accolades:

- 2013: American Library Association's (ALA) Best Fiction for Young Adults
- 2013: Amelia Bloomer Book List

=== The Paper Cowboy ===
The Paper Cowboy was published in 2016 by Penguin Young Readers Group.

The novel was inspired by her father's childhood in 1950s-era Downers Grove, a southwestern suburb of Chicago. The story revolves around the fears spread by McCarthyism in a communist fearing America. The novel touches on the topic of bullying and the impact of making false accusations.

=== The Jigsaw Jungle ===
The Jigsaw Jungle was published in 2018 by Penguin Young Readers Group.

The novel is about a young girl whose father has disappeared and must go on a clue searching adventure to find him. Ultimately, she finds her father but discovers a secret he had been keeping from her and her mother.
