= Bite Me (2019 film) =

- Film poster
- Directed by: Meredith Edwards
- Written by: Naomi McDougall Jones
- Produced by: Naomi McDougall Jones; Sarah Wharton
- Starring: Christian Coulson; Naomi McDougall Jones; Annie Golden; Naomi Grossman
- Cinematography: Eun-ah Lee
- Edited by: T.J. Misny; Chris Steele-Nicholson
- Music by: Eric Francis Olson
- Release date: May 7, 2019
- Running time: 83 minutes
- Country: United States
- Language: English

Bite Me is a 2019 American romantic comedy film directed by Meredith Edwards and written by Naomi McDougall Jones. The film stars Christian Coulson, Naomi McDougall Jones, Annie Golden and Naomi Grossman. The film premiered at the Cinequest Film Festival.

== Premise ==
The film is a subversive romantic comedy about a real-life vampire and the IRS agent who audits her.

== Cast ==
- Christian Coulson as James
- Naomi McDougall Jones as Sarah
- Annie Golden as Faith
- Naomi Grossman as Chrissy
- Harold Surratt as Tim
- Mahira Kakkar as Lily
- Cynthia Mace as Nan
- Katherine Kahrs as Lindsay Bolt

== Release ==
Bite Me releases in the form of a 51-screening, 40-city, 3-month, RV-fueled, Joyful Vampire Tour of America from May 6-August 1, 2019.
