= Christian Coulson =

English actor

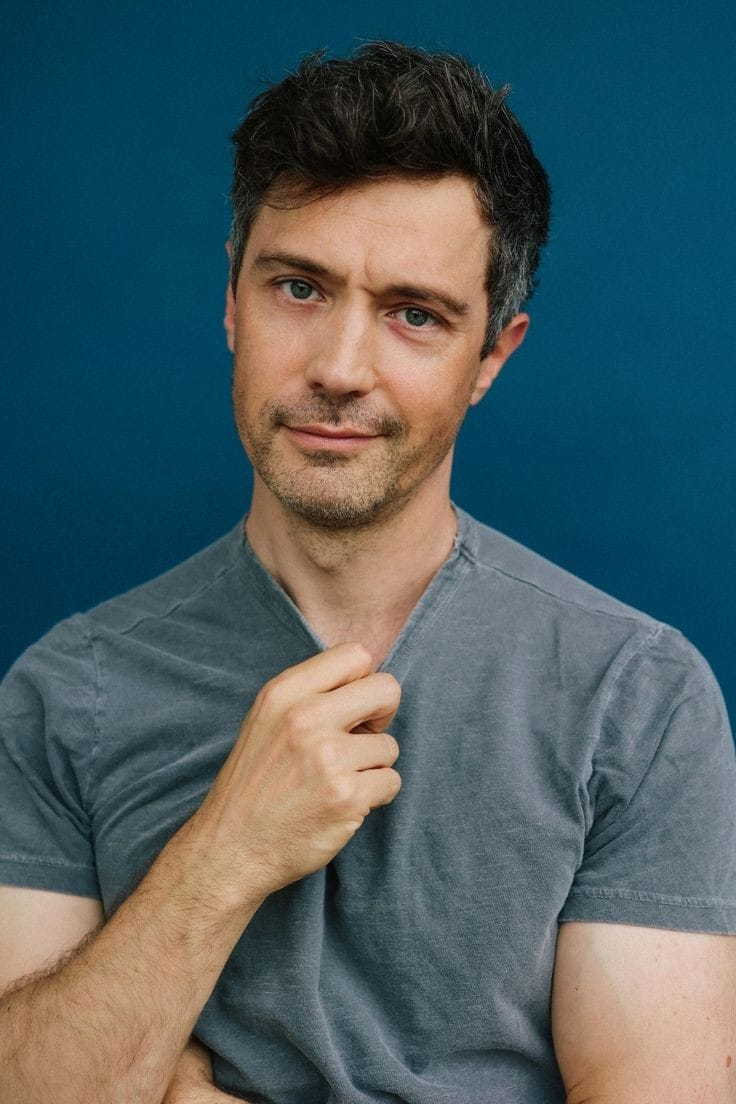
- Coulson in 2024
- Born: Christian Peter Coulson; 3 October 1978 (age 48); Manchester, England
- Education: Clare College, Cambridge (BA)
- Occupation: Actor
- Years active: 2001–present

Christian Peter Coulson is an English actor known for playing young Tom Marvolo Riddle (Lord Voldemort) in the 2002 fantasy film Harry Potter and the Chamber of Secrets.

== Early life ==
Coulson was born in Manchester. He attended Arnold House Preparatory School in London, before attending Westminster School on an academic scholarship. He was a member of the UK's National Youth Music Theatre from 1990 to 1997, and went on to the University of Cambridge, where he received a degree in English from Clare College in 2000. While at university, he played the M.C. (Master of Ceremonies) in Cabaret, Arturo Ui in The Resistible Rise of Arturo Ui and Claire in The Maids, as well as appearing in film and television.

== Career ==
Coulson gained worldwide attention and popularity for his role in 2002's Harry Potter and the Chamber of Secrets, in which he portrayed a 16-year-old Tom Riddle, even though he was 23 at the time. However, in 2007, director David Yates indicated on MTV that Coulson would not reprise his role in Half-Blood Prince, since, at 29, he was by then too old.

He also wrote the lyrics and book for a rock musical called The Fallen which was performed at Bedford Modern School in 1998.

As of 2015, Coulson resides and works in New York City as an actor, director and photographer.

== Filmography ==
=== Films ===
Year	Film	Role	Notes
2002	The Four Feathers	Drummer Boy	Uncredited
2002	Harry Potter and the Chamber of Secrets	16-year-old Tom Riddle	Nominated – Phoenix Film Critics Society Award for Best Cast
2002	The Hours	Ralph Partridge	Helper at Hogarth Press, run by Leonard Woolf
2005	Take Me Back	Charlie	
2007	Last Night	Nick	
2011	Harry Potter and the Deathly Hallows - Part 2	16-year-old Tom Riddle	Archival footage
2012	I Am Nasrine	Tommy	
2012	Gayby	Aaron	
2012	Leaving Circadia	Colin	
2013	Amateur	Evan	
2014	Love Is Strange	Ian	
2015	Peter and John	Peter Roland	
2019	Bite Me	James Thayer	

=== Television ===
Year	Title	Role	Notes
2001	Love in a Cold Climate	Matt Radlett	Miniseries
2001	Weirdsister College	Ben Stemson	Main role; 13 episodes
2002	The Forsyte Saga	Jolly Forsyte	Miniseries
2003	Hornblower:Loyalty	Midshipman John 'Jack' Hammond	TV Movie
2003	Charles II: The Power and the Passion	James, Duke of Monmouth	TV Movie
2003	Little Britain	Joe	Episode: Hard-Boiled Egg Eating
2005	Agatha Christie's Marple	Edmund Swettenham	Episode: A Murder Is Announced
2005	Beethoven	Archduke Rudolph	Miniseries
2005	Brief Encounters	Adam	Episode: Lost & Found
2009	The Battery's Down: Losing My Mind	Raoul	Episode: Losing My Mind
2010	Jeffery & Cole Casserole		Episode: "The Becky"
2010	Gossip Girl	Ivan	Episode: Touch of Eva
2011	Wiener & Wiener	Garry	3 episodes
2011	The Good Wife	Andre Bergson	Episode: Death Row Tip
2017	Nashville	Damien George	5 episodes
2018	Mozart in the Jungle	Sebastian	8 episodes
2019	Until the Wedding	James	TV pilot
2020	High Fidelity	Benjamin	2 episodes
2020	Blue Bloods	Brooks Hammond	Episode: "Bones to Pick"

=== Audio drama ===
Year	Title	Role
2007	Doctor Who: The Bride of Peladon	Pelleas
2008	Doctor Who: The Haunting of Thomas Brewster	Robert McIntosh

=== Audiobooks ===
Year	Title	Author	Notes	Ref.
2011	The White Devil	Justin Evans		
2014	Moth and Spark	Anne Leonard		
2014	Twenty Trillion Leagues Under the Sea	Adam Roberts		
2015	The Dead House	Dawn Kurtagich	AudioFile Earphones Award	
2016	No Man's Land	Simon Tolkien		
2017	The Gentleman's Guide to Vice and Virtue: Montague Siblings, Book 1	Mackenzi Lee	AudioFile Earphones Award	
2018	Into?	North Morgan		
2019	Fireborne	Rosaria Munda	AudioFile Earphones Award	
2021	The Nobleman's Guide to Scandal and Shipwrecks: Montague Siblings, Book 3	Mackenzi Lee		
2021	Dark Rise	C. S. Pacat		
2023	Dark Heir	C. S. Pacat		
2023	The Winter Soldier: Cold Front	Mackenzi Lee		
2023	In Memoriam	Alice Winn		
2023	Sword Catcher	Cassandra Clare		
2025	The Ragpicker King	Cassandra Clare		
2026	The Price You Pay	Aiden Truhen		
2026	Seven Demons	Aiden Truhen		

== Theatre ==
- Romeo and Juliet – Liverpool Playhouse, Liverpool (2002) Romeo
- Journey's End – Comedy Theatre, London (2004) Raleigh
- Festen – UK Tour (2006) Christian
- Ghosts – Gate Theatre, London (2007) Osvald
- Travesties – McCarter Theatre, New Jersey (2012) Tristan Tzara
- Shakespeare in Love – Pennsylvania Shakespeare Festival, Desales University (2018) Lord Wessex
- King Richard II – Pennsylvania Shakespeare Festival, Desales University (2018) King Richard
- The XIXth (The Nineteenth) – The Old Globe Theatre, San Diego (2023) Neville
