= Clifton, Idaho =

- City
- Location of Clifton in Franklin County, Idaho.
- Coordinates: 42°11′08″N 112°00′06″W
- Country: United States
- State: Idaho
- County: Franklin

Area
  - Total: 2.30 sq mi (5.95 km^{2})
  - Land: 2.30 sq mi (5.95 km^{2})
  - Water: 0 sq mi (0.00 km^{2})
- Elevation: 4,846 ft (1,477 m)

Population (2020)
  - Total: 413
  - Density: 132.2/sq mi (51.06/km^{2})
- Time zone: UTC-7 (Mountain (MST))
  - Summer (DST): UTC-6 (MDT)
- ZIP code: 83228
- Area code: 208
- FIPS code: 16-16120
- GNIS feature ID: 2409483
- Website: cliftonidaho.com

Clifton is a city in Franklin County, Idaho, United States. The population was 413 at the 2020 census. It is part of the Logan, Utah-Idaho Metropolitan Statistical Area.

== Geography ==
Clifton lies in the northern end of Cache Valley, at the base of the Bannock Mountain Range.

According to the United States Census Bureau, the city has a total area of 2.25 square miles (5.83 km^{2}), all of it land.

== History ==
Clifton was originally settled by Thomas Charles Davis Howell and his sons in the Spring of 1869. A Latter-day Saint branch was organized here with William Jared Pratt as president later that year. A post office was set up in 1870. A ward was organized in 1877.

In 1930 Clifton had a population of 217.

== Demographics ==
Historical population
Census	Pop.	Note	%±
1920	234		—
1930	217		−7.3%
1940	268		23.5%
1950	201		−25.0%
1960	150		−25.4%
1970	137		−8.7%
1980	208		51.8%
1990	228		9.6%
2000	213		−6.6%
2010	259		21.6%
2020	413		59.5%
U.S. Decennial Census

=== 2010 census ===
As of the census of 2010, there were 259 people, 77 households, and 68 families residing in the city. The population density was 115.1 inhabitants per square mile (44.4/km^{2}). There were 88 housing units at an average density of 39.1 per square mile (15.1/km^{2}). The racial makeup of the city was 97.7% White and 2.3% from two or more races. Hispanic or Latino of any race were 1.9% of the population.

There were 77 households, of which 46.8% had children under the age of 18 living with them, 84.4% were married couples living together, 1.3% had a female householder with no husband present, 2.6% had a male householder with no wife present, and 11.7% were non-families. 11.7% of all households were made up of individuals, and 7.8% had someone living alone who was 65 years of age or older. The average household size was 3.36 and the average family size was 3.65.

The median age in the city was 31.4 years. 40.9% of residents were under the age of 18; 3.9% were between the ages of 18 and 24; 23.2% were from 25 to 44; 20.8% were from 45 to 64; and 11.2% were 65 years of age or older. The gender makeup of the city was 50.2% male and 49.8% female.

=== 2000 census ===
As of the census of 2000, there were 213 people, 61 households, and 53 families residing in the city. The population density was 94.6 inhabitants per square mile (36.5/km^{2}). There were 71 housing units at an average density of 31.5 per square mile (12.2/km^{2}). The racial makeup of the city was 98.59% White, 0.47% Native American, 0.47% from other races, and 0.47% from two or more races. Hispanic or Latino of any race were 0.47% of the population.

There were 61 households, out of which 45.9% had children under the age of 18 living with them, 78.7% were married couples living together, 6.6% had a female householder with no husband present, and 11.5% were non-families. 11.5% of all households were made up of individuals, and 6.6% had someone living alone who was 65 years of age or older. The average household size was 3.49 and the average family size was 3.78.

In the city, the population was spread out, with 36.6% under the age of 18, 8.5% from 18 to 24, 18.3% from 25 to 44, 22.1% from 45 to 64, and 14.6% who were 65 years of age or older. The median age was 33 years. For every 100 females, there were 102.9 males. For every 100 females age 18 and over, there were 117.7 males.

The median income for a household in the city was $35,208, and the median income for a family was $36,667. Males had a median income of $28,333 versus $19,375 for females. The per capita income for the city was $12,755. About 9.7% of families and 13.2% of the population were below the poverty line, including 19.0% of those under the age of eighteen and none of those 65 or over.

== Notable people ==
- Harold B. Lee, eleventh president of the Church of Jesus Christ of Latter-day Saints was born in Clifton on March 28, 1899.
- Tara Westover, author who wrote a memoir, Educated, about her childhood there.
