= Educated (memoir) =

2018 memoir by Tara Westover

Educated: A Memoir
- First edition cover
- Author: Tara Westover
- Audio read by: Julia Whelan
- Cover artist: Patrik Svensson
- Language: English
- Subject: Memoir
- Publisher: Random House
- Publication date: February 18, 2018
- Publication place: United States
- Media type: Print (hardcover and paperback), e-book, audiobook
- Pages: 352
- Awards: 2019 Alex Award
- ISBN: 978-0-399-59050-4 (First edition hardcover)
- Dewey Decimal: 270.092 B
- LC Class: CT3262.I2 W47 2018
- Website: tarawestover.com/book

Educated is a 2018 memoir by American author Tara Westover. Westover recounts overcoming her survivalist Mormon family in order to go to college and emphasizes the importance of education in enlarging her world. She details her journey from her isolated life in the rural mountains of Clifton, Idaho to completing a PhD program in history at the University of Cambridge. She started college at 17 having had no formal education. She explores her struggle to reconcile her desire to learn with the world she inhabited with her father.

On September 13, 2020, The New York Times reported that the book had spent 132 consecutive weeks on the Hardcover Non-Fiction Best Seller list. It won a 2019 Alex Award and was shortlisted for the Los Angeles Times Book Prize, PEN America's Jean Stein Book Award, and two awards from the National Book Critics Circle Award.

== Summary ==
Westover lived in isolation in Buck's Peak, Idaho with her parents, pseudonymously referred to as Gene and Faye Westover respectively, and the rest of her family. Gene was paranoid about hospitals, public education, and the government, partially due to the siege at Ruby Ridge. Faye consequently homeschools the Westover children. Gene denies Westover's attempts to seek normality in her life. Her brother Shawn initially helps her and the two grow closer, but he starts physically abusing her as she befriends Charles, a boy she meets while performing in theater. Another of Westover's brothers, Tyler, learns of the abuse and encourages her to leave home and take the ACT to be able to apply to Brigham Young University (BYU) in Provo, Utah. Westover is later admitted to BYU under a scholarship. Shawn reconciles with her after standing up to Gene on her behalf.

After her acceptance, Tara Westover studies at Brigham Young University and receives scholarships allowing her to continue attending. The pressure of maintaining her grades in order to keep her scholarship results in Westover feeling stressed. Additionally, her alienation from the outside world and lack of formal schooling become issues. Later, she reconnects with Charles but is unable to act romantically towards him because of her conservative upbringing. Remembering Gene's and Shawn's abuse towards her results in Westover terminating her relationship with Charles.

Westover now feels alienated in Idaho and worries that Gene may have bipolar disorder. She cuts ties with him but reconnects after he expresses interest in her life at school. After Shawn marries Emily, a young woman he was dating, Tara worries about Emily, who previously expressed fear of Shawn. Tara confides to one of her professors about her family's background. Her professor encourages her to apply for the studying abroad program at Cambridge. After arriving at King's College in Cambridge, Tara Westover is assigned to work with Professor Jonathan Steinberg. Both of her professors encourage her to attend graduate school. Tara Westover applies for and wins the Gates Scholarship and forms a temporary truce with Gene. The two previously fell out over how she chronicled her past to local news outlets and her decision to attend school in England.

After returning to Cambridge, Westover takes steps to be part of the world, including getting immunized for vaccinations her family rejected. She occasionally returns to Idaho where she learns that Shawn is still abusing Emily. Her sister, Audrey, learned about Shawn's behavior, but Faye does not believe her. Westover and Faye take up email correspondence through which the latter suggests that Gene is mentally ill and writes about how they plan to get Shawn the help he needs. On another trip home, Shawn briefly shows signs of change but later accuses Audrey of lying about his abusive behavior and threatens to kill her. Gene and Faye do not take their daughter seriously when she tells them about Shawn's threat.

Tara encounters Shawn with a bloody knife on another visit home. Terrified, she lies that Gene lied about Shawn's treatment to Audrey. Later, she realizes that Faye had never been on her or Audrey's side. After returning to Cambridge, Shawn threatens her life. Audrey also cuts ties with Westover, claiming she is under Satan's control. Tara then begins graduate school at Harvard in Cambridge, Massachusetts and her parents briefly visit trying to convince her to come home.

After returning home again, Tara Westover discovers that Erin, Shawn's ex-girlfriend, wrote to Faye that she was delusional and demonizing her brother. Tara returns to Harvard and eventually Cambridge. After suffering panic attacks, she ends contact with her parents for a year, attempting to recover. She struggles in her studies, however Tyler encourages her and she successfully completes her PhD degree. Years later, Westover returns to Idaho for her maternal grandmother's funeral. She reunites with Tyler, his wife, two maternal aunts, and her other siblings, most of whom still take Gene's and Shawn's side. At the end of the memoir, Tara Westover is in touch with only a few family members and accepts that she needs to be away from the mountain.

== People featured in the book ==
=== Westover family ===
- Gene Westover (pseudonym for Val) is Westover's father, who did not believe in public education or doctors. He owns a metal scrapyard in Idaho.
- Faye Westover (pseudonym for LaRee) is Westover's mother, a midwife and herbal specialist. She teaches her children at home.
- Tony Westover is Westover's oldest brother and first child of their parents. He is noted only as working with their father at the scrapyard. He is 12 years older than Tara.
- Shawn Westover (pseudonym for Travis, died in 2024) is Westover's older brother, the second brother of the siblings, 10 years older than Tara. Shawn was physically, mentally and emotionally abusive toward Westover, and later to his wife.
- Tyler Westover is Westover's older brother, the third brother of the seven siblings. Tyler is the first to go to college, and he encourages Westover to take the ACT so she can apply and go, too. He supports her against their parents and brother Shawn. He is 8 years older than Tara.
- Luke Westover is Westover's older brother, the fourth brother. Luke is depicted as the brother who caught fire in the scrapyard and Westover had to help Faye nurse him back to health. He is 6 years older than Tara.
- Audrey Westover (pseudonym for Valaree) is Westover's only sister. She helps their mother with the herbal business. Although not close, Westover and Audrey together confront their mother about the abuse they suffered from Shawn. Audrey later cuts Westover out of her life, fearful of being disowned by their parents. She is the fifth child, 5 years older than Tara.
- Richard Westover is Westover's older brother, fifth of the brothers, four years older than Tara. Richard remains loyal to the Mormon religion, and gives up his parental compelled isolation. He pursues higher education and marries.
- Tara Westover is the youngest child and the writer of her memoir.
- Grandma-down-the-hill is Gene's mother. She often disagrees with Gene about his family, and encourages Westover to get an education and escape so she can live a normal life.
- Grandma-over-in-town is Faye's mother. A prim and proper woman whom Westover didn't really connect with when she was growing up. She doesn't approve of Gene and became estranged from her daughter Faye after her marriage.
- Aunt Debbie is Faye's estranged sister. After Westover distanced herself from her family, Debbie accepted her and Tyler with open arms. She helped Westover get her passport so she could study abroad.
- Aunt Angie is Faye's other estranged sister. Angie was cast out of the Westover family after filing for unemployment when she was fired from the family business. Gene thought Angie was trying to put him on a government watchlist.

=== Other major people ===
- Charles is Westover's first boyfriend. She ends up distancing herself from him when Shawn's abuse gets worse and he tries to tell her that Shawn's behavior wasn't normal. They remain friends to this day.
- Drew is Westover's boyfriend during the third part of the memoir. He is the first boyfriend whom she tells about her family and her upbringing.
- Dr. Kerry is Westover's professor at BYU. He helps her get a spot in the study abroad program to Cambridge and encourages/supports her in her academic career.
- Dr. Jonathan Steinberg is Westover's advisor at Cambridge. He finds her talented and takes an interest in her education.
- Erin is one of Shawn's ex-girlfriends. Westover reaches out to her in hopes she will help corroborate Westover's timeline of Shawn's abuse. While "helping" her, Erin also communicates with Faye, saying that Westover is "demonizing" Shawn.
- Sadie is another of Shawn's ex-girlfriends. She also suffered from Shawn's psychological abuse.
- Robin is Westover's second-year roommate. She helps her adjust to living with strangers and other aspects of life off the mountain.
- Emily Westover is Shawn's wife, who is nearly a decade younger than he. Westover describes her as "compliant", and predicts that Shawn will abuse and manipulate her.
- Stefanie Westover is Tyler's wife. She helps him transition into the larger world. She supports Tyler when he confronts his parents about Shawn's abuse of Westover.
- Kami Westover is Richard's wife.
- Benjamin is Audrey's husband.

== Background ==
Of her upbringing, Tara Westover has said, "My father created our reality in a really meaningful way because we were so isolated. He would say these things about public education and doctors and the government and we didn't know any better. We didn't go to school so as far as we knew the world was exactly the way our father described it." Westover received an undergraduate degree at Brigham Young University and her PhD degree at Cambridge.

Westover decided to write the book after she confronted her parents about her brother's abuse, and the resulting conflict led to her becoming estranged from some members of her family. She began searching for stories to help her understand what had happened. In 2018, she told The New York Times, "I wrote the book I wished I could have given to myself when I was losing my family. When I was going through that experience, I became aware of how important stories are in telling us how to live—how we should feel, when we should feel proud, when we should feel ashamed. I was losing my family, and it seemed to me that there were no stories for that—no stories about what to do when loyalty to your family was somehow in conflict with loyalty to yourself... forgiveness. I wanted a story about forgiveness that did not conflate forgiveness with reconciliation, or did not treat reconciliation as the highest form of forgiveness. In my life, I knew the two might always be separate. I didn't know if I would ever reconcile with my family, and I needed to believe that I could forgive, regardless."

Westover said that she set out to explore the complexity of difficult family relationships. In an interview with The Irish Times in Dublin she said, "You can love someone and still choose to say goodbye to them, and you can miss someone every day and still be glad they're not in your life." Her parents' attorney said that "Her parents raised their family in what Tara described as an extremist mindset, but what they felt was self-sufficiency." They maintain that there is only a "little germ of truth" in her book. Their attorney said Westover's parents were hurt that Westover would write a book which slanders her upbringing and that she would accuse her brother [Shawn] of the abuse described. Tara Westover's mother later published a book entitled "Educating" that provides her perspective on some of the events described in "Educated."

== Reception ==
Educated was an instant #1 New York Times bestseller and was positively reviewed by The New York Times, The Atlantic, USA Today, Vogue,The Economist, and Literary Review which praised Westover's writing as "crisp, persuasive and heartbreaking in its honesty." The book was also nominated for a number of national awards including the Los Angeles Times Book Prize, PEN America's Jean Stein Book Award, and two awards from the National Book Critics Circle Award.

Educated in hardcover spent more than two years on The New York Times bestseller list and is being translated into 45 languages. The New York Times ranked Educated as one of the 10 Best Books of 2018, and The American Booksellers Association named Educated the Nonfiction Book of the Year. As of December 2020, the book has sold more than 8 million copies.

== Awards and recognition ==
Westover's book earned many awards and accolades:

- 2021: IndieBound's Indie Biography & Memoir Bestseller List
- 2019: American Library Association's (ALA) Top Ten Amazing Audiobooks for Young Adults
- 2019: Outstanding Books for the College Bound
- 2019: Westover chosen by Time magazine as one of the 100 most influential people of 2019
- 2019: ALA's Alex Award
- 2018: The National Book Critics Circle Award for Autobiography
- 2018: One of The New York Times' 10 Best Books
- 2018: Amazon Editors' pick for the Best Book of 2018
- Named the Book of the Year by the American Booksellers Association
- Finalist for the John Leonard Prize from the National Book Critics Circle
- Finalist for the Autobiography Award from the National Book Critics Circle
- Finalist for the Los Angeles Times Book Prize in Biography
- Finalist for PEN/America's Jean Stein Award
- Finalist for the American Booksellers Association Audiobook of the Year Award
- Finalist for Barnes & Noble's Discover Great Writers Award
- Long-listed for the Carnegie Medal of Excellence
- Winner of the Goodreads Choice Award for Autobiography
- Winner of the Audie Award for Autobiography/Memoir
- Apple's Best Memoir of the Year
- Audible's Best Memoir of the Year
- Hudson Group Best Book of the Year
- President Barack Obama's pick for summer reading and his Favorite Books of the Year list
- Bill Gates' Holiday Reading list
- Educated named one of the Best Books of the year by The Washington Post, O, The Oprah Magazine, Time, NPR, Good Morning America, The San Francisco Chronicle, The Guardian, The Economist, Financial Times, The New York Post, The Skimm, Bloomberg, Real Simple, Town & Country, Bustle, Publishers Weekly, The Library Journal, Book Riot, and the New York Public Library.
- Featured speaker, Seattle Arts & Lectures, 2019
