= First Boy =

2005 novel by Gary Schmidt

- First edition
- Author: Gary Schmidt
- Language: English
- Genre: Children's novel
- Publisher: Henry Holt
- Publication date: 2005
- Publication place: United States
- Media type: Print (hardback & paperback)
- Pages: 197 pp
- ISBN: 978-0-8050-7859-6
- OCLC: 57243339
- LC Class: PZ7.S3527 Fi 2005

First Boy is a children's novel published in 2005 by Gary Schmidt. It was a Mark Twain Award nominee for the 2007–2008 year.

== Plot summary ==
Dragged into the political turmoil of a presidential election year, fourteen-year-old Cooper Jewett, who has run a New Hampshire dairy farm since his grandfather's death, stands up for himself and makes it clear whose first boy he really is. Cooper never knew his parents and his birth certificate is blacked out. Who is Cooper Jewett really? Nobody knows.

== Characters ==
- Cooper Jewett
- Mrs. Perley
- Mr. Searle
