= Christopher J. Lane =

- Born: 1966 (age 59–60)
- Education: University of East Anglia; University of Sussex; University of London
- Occupations: Professor, author, writer

Christopher J. Lane (born 1966) is a British-American medical writer, researcher and intellectual historian who taught medical humanities and the history of medicine at Northwestern University until his retirement in 2022. A former Guggenheim fellow, awarded the Prescrire Prize for Medical Writing, he has held Northwestern's Pearce Miller Research Professorship and is a member of the Center for Bioethics and Medical Humanities in the Feinberg School of Medicine. Previously, he taught at Emory University, where he was director of the Psychoanalytic Studies Program in the Psychiatry Department. A Victorianist by training, Lane specializes in 19th- and 20th-century psychology, psychiatry, and intellectual history. He is a regular contributor to Psychology Today and comparable media.

== Publications ==
Lane is the author of six books and the editor of two essay collections:

- The Ruling Passion (Duke University Press, 1995)
- The Burdens of Intimacy (University of Chicago Press, 1999)
- Hatred and Civility: The Antisocial Life in Victorian England (Columbia University Press, 2004)
- Shyness: How Normal Behavior Became a Sickness (Yale University Press, 2007)
- The Age of Doubt: Tracing the Roots of Our Religious Uncertainty (Yale University Press, 2011)
- Surge of Piety: Norman Vincent Peale and the Remaking of American Religious Life (Yale University Press, 2016)
- The Psychoanalysis of Race (Columbia University Press, 1998, editor)
- Homosexuality and Psychoanalysis (University of Chicago Press, 2001, co-editor).

His book Shyness: How Normal Behavior Became a Sickness critiques the broadness of the concept of social phobia as defined in the Diagnostic and Statistical Manual of Mental Disorders. Drawing heavily on unpublished papers at the American Psychiatric Association that document the creation and revision of the manual's third and fourth editions, Shyness also criticized the definitions of other mental disorders, including in a Los Angeles Times article that covered the controversies surrounding the drafting of the DSM-5. In Slate, he discussed some of the disputes over the direction of the DSM and the secrecy surrounding the revision of its fifth edition.

His articles on the DSM and psychiatric diagnosis have appeared in The New York Times, The Washington Post, The Boston Globe, Los Angeles Times, New York Sun, and Chronicle Review.
