= Ozzie Rodriguez =

American playwright (1944–2025)

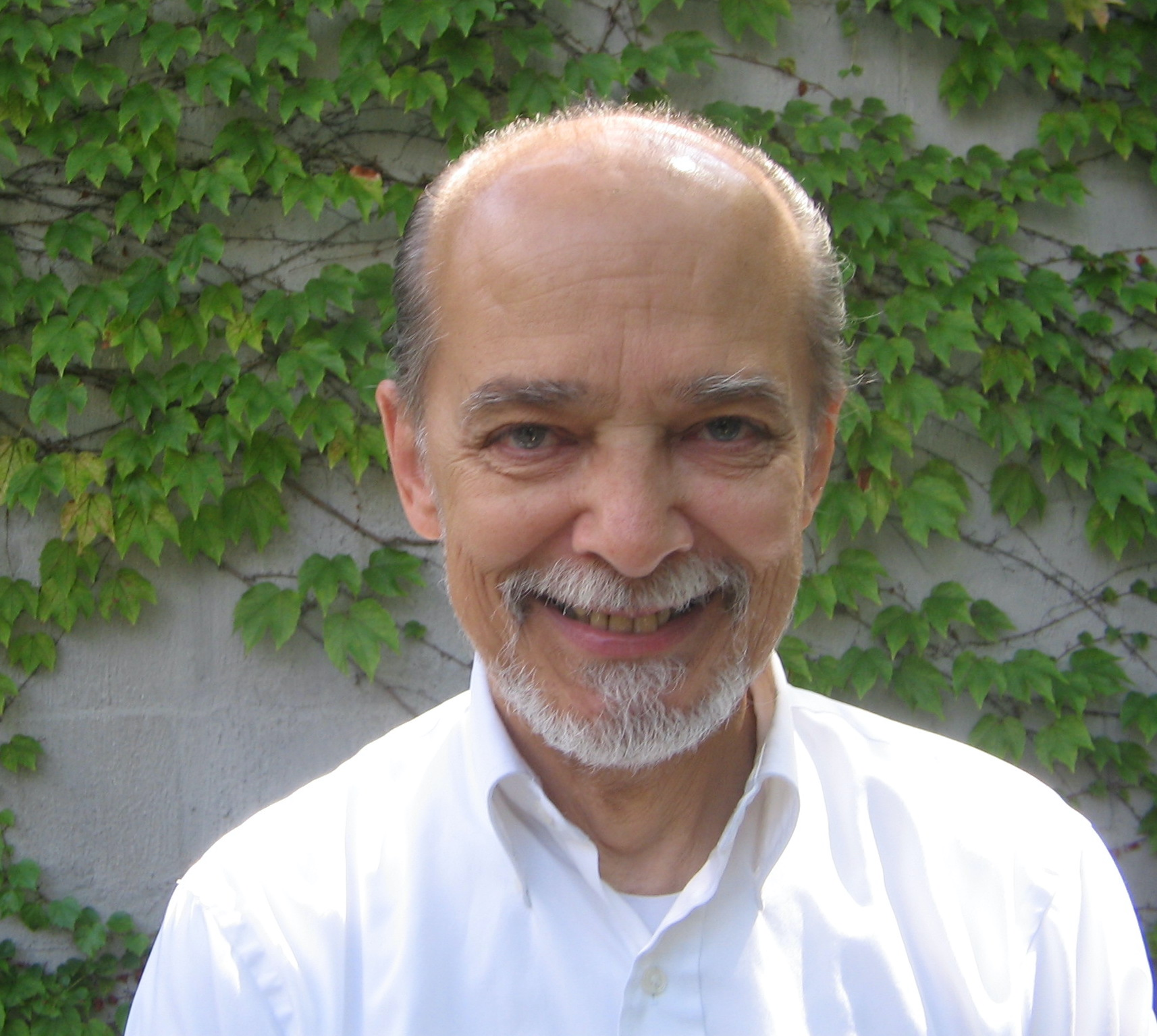

Ozzie Rodriguez (February 20, 1944 – July 24, 2025) was an American playwright, actor, director, visual artist, and archivist. He was the Director of Archives at La MaMa Experimental Theatre Club from 1987 until his passing in 2025. In this capacity, he was instrumental in preserving and promoting the history of Off-Off Broadway and the rise of the experimental theatre movement, both in New York and worldwide.

Rodriguez was born on February 20, 1944, in the Bronx into a tightly knit multigenerational Puerto Rican family to which he was devoted. He attended the High School of Performing Arts in NYC. His first theatre job was Off-Broadway in 1963 with Frank Langella in The Immoralist. He first performed at La MaMa in 1967, stepping into a role for director Nelly Vivas, and went on to appear in new works by Sam Shepard, Shuji Terayama, and Lanford Wilson. In 1972, he became a Resident Director at La MaMa, collaborating with artists including Anna Deavere Smith, Ron Perlman, and Rhodessa Jones.

Rodriguez's archival work earned La MaMa Archive a special Obie Award in 1995 for his organization and preservation efforts, and his guided tours of the archive were renowned for their passionate storytelling that connected the materials to broader cultural and political contexts. As a bilingual playwright, he received recognition for contributions to Hispanic culture, including the Distinguished Contributions to Hispanic Culture Award for his play Madre Del Sol / Mother Of The Sun.
