= Okay for Now =

2011 young adult novel by Gary D. Schmidt

- Author: Gary D. Schmidt
- Audio read by: Lincoln Hoppe
- Language: English
- Published: April 5, 2011 (Clarion Books/Houghton Mifflin Harcourt)
- Pages: 368
- ISBN: 978-0-547-15260-8
- Preceded by: The Wednesday Wars
- Followed by: Just Like That

Okay for Now is a children's novel by Gary D. Schmidt, published in 2011. It is a companion to Schmidt's 2007 novel The Wednesday Wars and features one of its supporting characters, Doug Swieteck.

== Plot summary ==
Following the events of The Wednesday Wars, Doug Swieteck is fourteen years old and living on Long Island in 1968 during the Vietnam War. After Doug's father is fired for mouthing off to his boss, the Swietecks move to the small town of Marysville, New York, where Doug feels out of place and unwelcome.

Underneath the glass was this book, a huge book, a huge, huge book. Its pages were longer than a good-sized baseball bat. I'm not lying. And on the whole page there was only one picture. Of a bird.
I couldn't take my eyes off it.
He was all alone, and he looked like he was falling out of the sky and into this cold, green sea. His wings were back, his tail feathers were back, and his neck was pulled around as if he was trying to turn but couldn't. His eyes were round and bright and afraid. And his beak was opened a little bit, probably because he was trying to suck in some air before he crashed into the water. The sky around him was dark, like the air was too heavy to fly in.
This bird was falling, and there wasn't a single thing in the world that cared at all.
It was the most terrifying picture I'd ever seen.
The most beautiful.

— Gary D. Schmidt, Okay for Now (2011)

In Marysville, Doug is fascinated by The Birds of America, a book illustrated by John James Audubon, on display under glass at the local library. Doug starts to learn how to draw, starting with a copy of Audubon's Arctic Tern under the tutelage of Mr. Powell, a librarian. Doug also meets a girl named Lillian "Lil" Spicer, on whom he eventually has a crush. Lil's father owns a deli, and hires Doug as a delivery boy, which lets him get to know other residents of Marysville. Upon starting eighth grade, Doug reveals himself to be unable to read. His English teacher is able to help him learn with an abridged version of Jane Eyre. Doug also deals with the assumption that he is a petty criminal, because his brother Christopher is also assumed to be one. His physical science teacher assures Doug that he sees him as his own person. Also at school, Doug and his gym coach, a struggling veteran, get off to a contentious start. Around Christmastime, Doug's oldest brother Lucas returns home from Vietnam with permanent injuries, and Doug helps him adjust. Doug improves his relationship with his gym coach by helping him in class and introducing him to Lucas, who suffers similarly with memories of the war. Over time, Doug gains the support and trust of people in Marysville, which allow him to face problems with confidence and hope.

== Chapters ==
Each chapter is named for a different plate from The Birds of America. In order, they are:

The Arctic Tern, plate #250

The Red-Throated Diver, #202

The Large-Billed Puffin, #293

The Black-Backed Gull, #241

The Yellow Shank, #288

The Snowy Heron, #242

The Forked-Tailed Petrel, #260

The Brown Pelican, #251

The Great Esquimaux Curlew, #237

== Development ==
Schmidt stated "I have always made fun of authors who say they had to write a sequel because there were characters they couldn’t get out of their heads, but now I have to take back all those truly horrible things I said." The novel was initially drafted from a third-person perspective, and Schmidt struggled with telling the story, but after switching to a first-person narration, Schmidt wrote on "my third start on this stupid novel, it was Doug telling the story and it was right." Like Doug, Schmidt was underestimated by his teachers until one taught him to read.

== Critical reception ==
Writing for The New York Times, author Richard Peck said the novel "is crowded with more incident and empowerment than any eighth-grade year or novel can quite contain" but praised its emotional weight. Augusta Scattergood, reviewing for the Christian Science Monitor, called the novel "often heartbreaking but always funny" and the audience "will also have discovered something important about the capacity for love and the power of resiliency" by the end of the novel.

=== Awards and honors ===
Okay for Now was a Children's Choice award winner and, in October 2011, named a finalist for the National Book Award for Young People's Literature. The novel appeared on several lists including, The New York Times Best Sellers, the Children's Book Committee of Bank Street College of Education's Best Children's Book of the Year, and Amazon Book of the Year.
