= Gary D. Schmidt =

American author (born 1957)

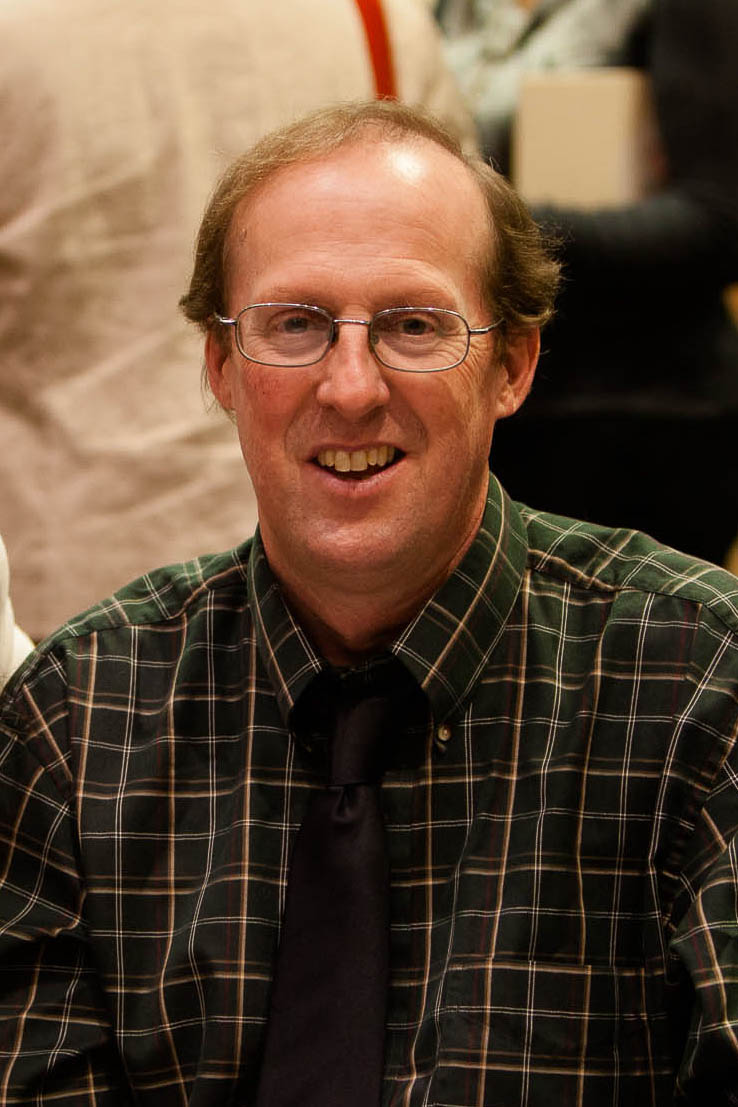
- Schmidt at the Mazza Museum in 2012
- Born: April 14, 1957 (age 69); Hicksville, New York, U.S.
- Education: Gordon College; University of Illinois at Urbana-Champaign (PhD)
- Occupations: Academic, writer
- Spouse: Anne E Stickney (m. 1979; died 2013)
- Writing career
- Genre: Realistic fiction
- Notable works: Lizzie Bright and the Buckminster Boy; The Wednesday Wars; Okay for Now
- Notable awards: National Book Award (finalist); Newbery Honor; Printz Honor; Josette Frank Award

Gary David Schmidt (born April 14, 1957) is an American author of children's and young adults' fiction books. He currently resides in Alto, Michigan, where he is a professor emeritus of English at Calvin University.

== Life and literary career ==
=== Early life and education ===
Gary D. Schmidt was born in Hicksville, New York, in 1957. According to Schmidt, he was named after gameshow host Garrison Moore. As a child, Schmidt says he was underestimated by teachers at an elementary school where students were classified by aptitude. Concerning his early education, Schmidt explained in an interview with NPR: "If you're Track One you're the college-bound kid; if you're Track Two you'll have a good job; if you're Track Three you're the stupid kid. And I was tracked as Track Three." After intervention from a concerned teacher, Schmidt found a love for reading, an event which served as inspiration for his novel Okay for Now.

In the mid-1970s, Schmidt attended Gordon College, earning an undergraduate degree in English in 1979. Thereafter he attended University of Illinois Urbana-Champaign, obtaining a master's degree in English in 1981 before graduating with a PhD in medieval literature in 1985. Schmidt has since worked as a professor for the English department at Calvin University.

=== Awards and honors ===
In 2005, Schmidt's novel Lizzie Bright and the Buckminster Boy was awarded a Newbery Honor, which recognizes "the most distinguished contribution[s] to American literature for children", and a Printz Honor. In 2008, he was awarded a second Newbery Honor for The Wednesday Wars.

Schmidt's novel Okay for Now, the 2011 sequel to The Wednesday Wars, was a National Book Award finalist. It also was the winner of a 2012 Children's Choice Book Award and listed as a Best Children's Book of the Year from the Children's Book Committee of Bank Street College of Education.

The Labors of Hercules Beal received the Josette Frank Award for Fiction from the Children's Book Committee and was listed as a Best Children's Book of the Year with Outstanding Merit in 2024. Schmidt's work has appeared multiple times on the CBC's Best Children's Book of the Year list, including Saint Ciaran, Straw into Gold, Mara's Stories, The Wonders of Donal O'Donnell, Trouble, What Came From the Stars, Martín de Porres, Orbiting Jupiter, Almost Time, and Celia Planted a Garden: The Story of Celia Thaxter and Her Island Garden.

=== Personal life ===
In 1996, Schmidt was diagnosed with lymphatic cancer. While being treated, he was exposed to a variety of other cancer patients whose stories, he claims, served as inspiration for future novels and encouraged him to write primarily for children and young adults.

Schmidt and his late wife, Anne, have six children; one is a teacher. He is a practicing Christian and describes himself as religious. He also enjoys teaching writing courses in prisons and detention centers, and experiences there served as inspiration for his novel Orbiting Jupiter.

=== The Wednesday Wars Series ===
In 2007, Schmidt released his award-winning book The Wednesday Wars. Four years later, in 2011, Schmidt released a companion novel, Okay For Now, followed by the third book of the series, Just Like That, in 2021. BookPage noted, "While each book can be read separately, overlapping characters and themes enrich each other in understated and often profound ways."

== Selected bibliography ==
(In order of publication)

- The Sin Eater (Dutton Publishers; New York; 1996)
- The Blessing of the Lord (Eerdmans; 1997)
- William Bradford: Plymouth's Faithful Pilgrim (Eerdmans Publishing Company; Grand Rapids; 1999)
- Anson's Way (Clarion Books; New York; 1999)
- Ciaran: The Tale of a Saint of Ireland (Eerdmans Publishing Company; Grand Rapids, MI; 2000)
- Mara's Stories (Henry Holt; New York; 2001)
- Lizzie Bright and the Buckminster Boy (New York; Clarion Books; 2004)
- In God's Hands (Jewish Lights Publications; Woodstock, Vermont; 2005)
- First Boy (Henry Holt; New York; 2005)
- The Wednesday Wars (Clarion Books; New York; 2007)
- Trouble (Clarion Books; New York; 2008)
- Straw into Gold (Clarion; 2009)
- Okay for Now (Clarion Books; New York; 2011)
- What Came from the Stars (Clarion Books; New York; 2012)
- Martín de Porres: The rose in the desert (Clarion; 2012)
- Orbiting Jupiter (Clarion; 2015)
- Star Wars: From a Certain Point of View (Del Rey; 2017)
- Pay Attention, Carter Jones (Clarion; 2019)
- Just Like That (Clarion; 2021)
- The Labors of Hercules Beal (Clarion; 2023)
- Jupiter Rising (Clarion; 2024)
