= Love Letters to the Dead =

2014 novel by Ava Dellaira

- First edition
- Author: Ava Dellaira
- Language: English
- Genre: teen fantasy novel Epistolary novel Realistic fiction
- Published: Farrar, Straus and Giroux (BYR), New York Hardcover March 2014 Ebook March 2014 Paperback September 2015
- Publication place: United States
- Pages: 336
- ISBN: 9780374346676

Love Letters to the Dead (2014) is the first novel by American author Ava Dellaira, published in 2014. This is a teen novel told through a series of letters written by a girl named Laurel who is grieving the recent mysterious death of her sister May. The novel is set in Albuquerque, New Mexico.

== Plot ==
Laurel has just started class at a new high school. She is a quiet student who still dresses like she's in middle school. Mrs. Buster, her English teacher, gives the class an assignment to write a letter to a dead person. Laurel chooses Kurt Cobain and begins an ongoing relationship with the other dead people. "Confiding in dead geniuses helps a teen process her grief and rage."

At the new school, Laurel makes friends and continues to write letters to dead people documenting the changes in her life as well as sharing her confusion and grief over the loss of her older sister.

Subplots include the rocky love story of Natalie who loves Hannah and is not afraid of acknowledging her sexual orientation, and Hannah's conflict in admitting she has an attraction to Natalie; dating heavily and experimenting sexually with boys in attempt to cover her desire to be with Natalie. There is also the relationship/love stories of Laurel and Sky, Laurel's mother and father, Tristan and Kristan, Laurel and May, May and her progressively older and shadier boyfriends, and Aunt Amy and "the Jesus man" (a very religious seeming man).

== Characters ==
- Laurel, the narrator of the novel, Laurel is a 15 year old freshman at a new school whose parents recently divorced and whose sister recently died.
- May, Laurel's older sister who recently died.
- Laurel's father, a hardworking construction worker grieving the loss of his marriage and his eldest daughter.
- Laurel's mother, an aspiring actress who married young when she realized she was pregnant with May and later leaves the marriage to pursue her own dreams. Her mother was an alcoholic and father died of cancer.
- Aunt Amy, Laurel's mother's sister, a waitress who "found God".
- Natalie, friend from her English class who has a crush on Hannah.
- Hannah, a popular red haired friend of Natalie's who is conflicted about her sexuality. Hannah lives with her grandmother and grandfather, and her abusive older brother.
- Jason, Hannah's older brother.
- Sky, Laurel's love interest.
- Kasey, a guy Hannah works with at Japanese Kitchen and whom she "messes around with."
- Tristan, a high school senior Natalie met in art class who befriends the three freshman girls and introduces them to his girlfriend Kristen.
- Kristen, a high school senior who loves Tristan and dreams of college and career.
- Mrs. Buster, Laurel's high school English teacher who assigns the project to write a letter to a dead person.
- Paul, May's last boyfriend, an older man.
- Billy, a friend of Paul's who molests Laurel.
- Carl and Mark, neighbors of Laurel and May whom they play "the dead game" with.
- Letters written to: Kurt Cobain, Elizabeth Bishop, River Phoenix, Amelia Earhart, Amy Winehouse, Judy Garland, Janis Joplin, Allan "Rocky" Lane, Jim Morrison, John Keats, e.e. cummings, Heath Ledger, and her sister May.

== Literary significance and reception ==
Elizabeth DeVita-Raeburn praised Ava Dellaira's realistic treatment of grief in 2014, "Dellaira has either experienced sibling loss or done good research, because her themes ring true: the way younger survivors feel lost without the map of their older sibling's precedent; the sense of being abandoned by their grieving parents; and the identity crisis that can come when the person they defined themselves against is gone."

Kirkus Reviews March 2014 noted, "The epistolary technique is perhaps too effective at building and sustaining narrative tension: Laurel so delays explaining her feelings of responsibility for May's death that the resolution of her story feels rushed. A tighter hand would have given more balance to an otherwise effective and satisfyingly heartbreaking melodrama."

The Sunday News (Lancaster, Pennsylvania) compares Love Letters to the Dead to another popular young adult novel, "Did You Love "The Fault In Our Stars"? Ready For Another Tearjerker? Grab Some Tissues..."

Thom Barthelmess in The Horn Book Magazine stated, "Dellaira's characters are authentically conceived and beautifully drawn. Teens meet situations of physical, sexual, and substance abuse with numbness, stoicism, and fury. Broken adults flail and try. With her epistolary confidants Laurel confronts the circumstances leading up to her sisters death, and makes peace with her place in it. She learns that, however dark our secrets, the only way out from the shadows is to stand in the light.

In 2014 Karen Coats, Bulletin of the Center for Children's Books, found the book, "Reminiscent of Chbosky's The Perks of Being a Wallflower,...powerfully emotional stuff"

Jeanne Fredriksen, The Booklist stated in 2014, "Well paced and cleverly plotted, this debut uses a fresh, new voice to tell a sometimes sad, sometimes edgy, but always compelling narrative." She further recommended the book for "Fans of Sarah Dessen and Jenny Han."

== Awards and nominations ==
YALSA 2015 Teens' Top Ten Nominee (The Young Adult Library Services Association (YALSA), a division of the American Library Association)

One of YALSA 2015 Amazing Audiobooks for Young Adults (The Young Adult Library Services Association (YALSA), a division of the American Library Association (ALA))

New Mexico's 2015 pick for the National Book Festival.

== Adaptations ==
In May 2015, Hollywood Reporter published and exclusive report that Catherine Hardwicke, who directed the first teen vampire film, Twilight, is in early talks to direct Love Letters to the Dead, a book adaption being produced by Twilight producers Temple Hill Entertainment. Dellaira will write the script.

== About the Author ==
Ava Dellaira was born in California and grew up in Albuquerque, New Mexico. She received her undergraduate degree from the University of Chicago and also graduated from the Iowa Writers' Workshop, where she was a Truman Capote Fellow. She currently lives in Santa Monica.
