= Tara Westover =

American historian and writer (born 1986)

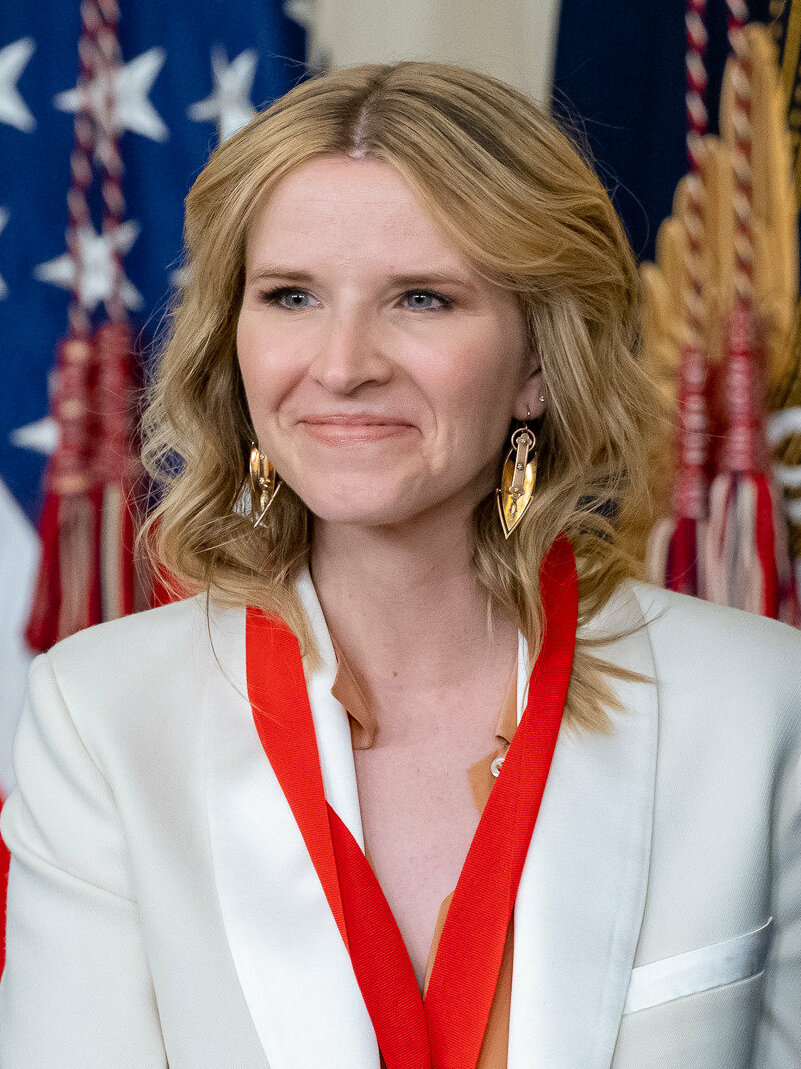
- Tara Westover receiving the National Humanities Medal on March 21, 2023 at the White House
- Born: September 27, 1986 (age 40); Clifton, Idaho, U.S.
- Education: Brigham Young University (BA); University of Cambridge (MA, PhD)
- Occupations: Historian; writer
- Writing career
- Language: English
- Notable work: Educated
- Website: tarawestover.com

Tara Westover (born September 27, 1986) is an American memoirist, essayist and historian. Her memoir Educated (2018) debuted at No. 1 on The New York Times bestseller list and was a finalist for a number of national awards, including the Los Angeles Times Book Prize, PEN America's Jean Stein Book Award, and two awards from the National Book Critics Circle Award. The New York Times ranked Educated as one of the 10 Best Books of 2018. Westover was chosen by Time as one of the 100 most influential people of 2019.

== Early life and education ==
Westover was the youngest of seven children born in Clifton, Idaho, (population 259), to Mormon survivalist parents, whom she pseudonymously refers to as Gene and Faye. She has five older brothers and an older sister. Her parents were suspicious of doctors, hospitals, public schools, and the federal government. Westover was born at home, delivered by a midwife, and was never taken to see a doctor or nurse. She was not registered for a birth certificate until she was nine years old. Her father resisted getting formal medical treatment for any of the family. Even when seriously injured, the children were treated only by their mother, who had studied herbalism and other methods of alternative healing.

All of the siblings were loosely homeschooled by their mother. Westover has said an older brother taught her to read, and she studied the scriptures of the Church of Jesus Christ of Latter-day Saints. She never attended a lecture, wrote an essay, or took an exam. There were few textbooks in her house. As a teenager, Westover began to want to enter the larger world and attend college. She purchased textbooks and studied independently in order to score well on the ACT, following the suggestion of Tyler, one of her older brothers. She gained admission to Brigham Young University in Provo, Utah, and was awarded a scholarship, although she had no high school diploma. After a difficult first year, in which Westover struggled to adjust to academia and the wider society at university, she became more successful and graduated with honors in 2008.

Next, she earned a master's degree from the University of Cambridge at Trinity College in Cambridge, England as a Gates Cambridge scholar, and was a visiting fellow at Harvard University in 2010. She returned to Trinity College earning a doctorate degree in intellectual history in 2014. Her thesis is entitled "The Family, Morality and Social Science in Anglo-American Cooperative Thought, 1813–1890". In 2009, while a graduate student at Cambridge, Westover told her parents that for many years (since age 15), she had been physically and psychologically abused by an older brother, Travis (pseudonymously referred to as Shawn in Educated). Her parents denied her account and suggested that Westover was under the influence of Satan. The family split over the events. Westover wrote about the estrangement, and her unusual path to and through university education in her acclaimed 2018 memoir, Educated.

== Career ==
Westover was an A. M. Rosenthal Writer in Residence at the Shorenstein Center at Harvard Kennedy School in the fall of 2019. She was then selected as a senior research fellow at the school for the spring of 2020. Westover has written for The New York Times and BBC News.

== Works ==
=== Educated ===
In 2018, Penguin Random House published Westover's memoir Educated, which recounts the story of her struggle to reconcile her desire for education and autonomy with her family's rigid ideology and isolated life. The coming-of-age story was a No. 1 New York Times bestseller, and was positively reviewed by the New York Times, The Atlantic, USA Today, Vogue, and The Economist among others.

As of February 2020, Educated in hardcover had spent two years on the New York Times bestseller list and has been translated into 45 languages. The book was voted the No. 1 Library Reads pick by American librarians and in August 2019, it had been checked out more frequently than any other book through all of New York Public Library's 88 branches. As of December 2020, Educated has sold more than 8 million copies. Through their attorney, the family has disputed some elements of Westover's book, including her suggestion that her father may have bipolar disorder and that her mother may have suffered a brain injury which resulted in reduced motor skills.

== Awards and recognition ==
Westover's book earned her several awards and other recognition.

- Named the Book of the Year by the American Booksellers Association
- Finalist for the John Leonard Prize from the National Book Critics Circle
- Finalist for the Autobiography Award from the National Book Critics Circle
- Finalist for the Los Angeles Times Book Prize
- Finalist for PEN/America's Jean Stein Award
- Finalist for the American Booksellers Association Audiobook of the Year Award
- Finalist for Barnes & Noble's Discover Great Writers Award
- One of The New York Times's 10 Best Books of 2018
- Long-listed for the Carnegie Medal of Excellence
- Winner of the Goodreads Choice Award for Autobiography
- Winner of the Audie Award for Autobiography/Memoir
- Alex Award from the American Library Association
- Named an "Amazing Audiobook for Young Adults" by the American Library Association
- Amazon Editors' pick for the Best Book of 2018
- Apple's Best Memoir of the Year
- Audible's Best Memoir of the Year
- Hudson Group Best Book of the Year
- President Barack Obama's pick for summer reading and his Favorite Books of the Year list
- Bill Gates's Holiday Reading list
- Westover chosen by Time as one of the 100 most influential people of 2019
- Educated named one of the Best Books of the year by The Washington Post, O, Oprah Magazine, Time, NPR, Good Morning America, The San Francisco Chronicle, The Guardian, The Economist, the Financial Times, the New York Post, The Skimm, Bloomberg, Real Simple, Town & Country, Bustle, Publishers Weekly, The Library Journal, Book Riot, and the New York Public Library.
- Featured speaker, Seattle Arts & Lectures, 2019
- New York Historical Society Women in Public Life Award
- James Joyce Award
- Evans Handcart Award
- National Humanities Medal, 2021

== Personal life ==
Westover lives in Brooklyn, New York.
