= Lizzie Bright and the Buckminster Boy =

2004 novel by Gary D. Schmidt

- 1st ed cover (Clarion, 2004)
- Author: Gary D. Schmidt
- Language: English
- Genre: Historical fiction
- Publisher: Clarion Books
- Publication date: 2004
- Publication place: United States

Lizzie Bright and the Buckminster Boy is a young adult historical novel by Gary D. Schmidt published by Clarion Books in 2004. The book received the Newbery Honor in 2005 and was selected as a Michael L. Printz Honor that same year.

The book was based on a real event. In 1912, the government of Maine put the residents of Malaga Island in a mental hospital and tore up their homes.

== Plot summary ==
This book is set in 1912. Turner Buckminster, a minister's son, has just moved from Boston, Massachusetts to Phippsburg, Maine and is constantly being scolded for simple misunderstandings, not to mention being automatically disliked by the boys of Phippsburg for being bad at baseball. Turner meets a black girl, Lizzie Bright Griffin, who becomes friends with him, despite his difficulty with social situations. Turner tries to save Lizzie's family and friends before they all must leave, or worse, get put into an insane asylum in New Gloucester, Maine (where they do eventually end up). But that means standing up to the authorities, including Turner's father.
