= Charlotte Parry =

British actress (born 1976)

- Born: 16 August 1976 (age 49); Birmingham, England
- Occupation: Actress
- Years active: 2000-Present

Charlotte Jane Parry (born 16 August 1976) is a British actress.

== Personal life ==
Born in Birmingham, England. She graduated from the London Academy of Music and Dramatic Art in 1999. She is also a painter and has trained as a midwife.

== Career ==
After graduating from LAMDA, she moved to New York City to make her Broadway debut in 2000 as Debbie in the Tony Award winning revival of The Real Thing that starred Jennifer Ehle. In 2007, she returned to Broadway to appear in the play Coram Boy and in 2011 she played Cecily Cardew in the Tony winning revival of The Importance of Being Earnest that starred Brian Bedford.

In 2013, Parry played Catherine Winslow in The Winslow Boy by Terence Rattigan.

Off-Broadway, Parry appeared as Phoebe in Peter Hall's 2005 production of As You Like It at BAM that starred Hall's daughter, Rebecca Hall.

Parry played Nat in the 2007 Roundabout Theatre Company production of Howard Katz by Patrick Marber and in 2008 she played Hilda in The Master Builder at the Irish Repertory Theatre and Shazza in Rainbow Kiss at 59E59 Theaters.

In 2010, she played Judith in Equivocation at the Manhattan Theatre Club and in 2011 she played Angela in Bluebird by Simon Stephens at the Atlantic Theater Company. In 2012 Parry played Helena Charles in Look Back in Anger at the Roundabout Theatre Company.

In 2013, Parry played Eliza Doolittle in Pygmalion at the Old Globe Theatre.

She was also a member of Sam Mendes's The Bridge Project in 2009 at BAM, which included her performing in The Winter's Tale and The Cherry Orchard.

Parry also is known for lending her voice to audio books, having narrated over 40.
