= Mackenzi Lee =

American author

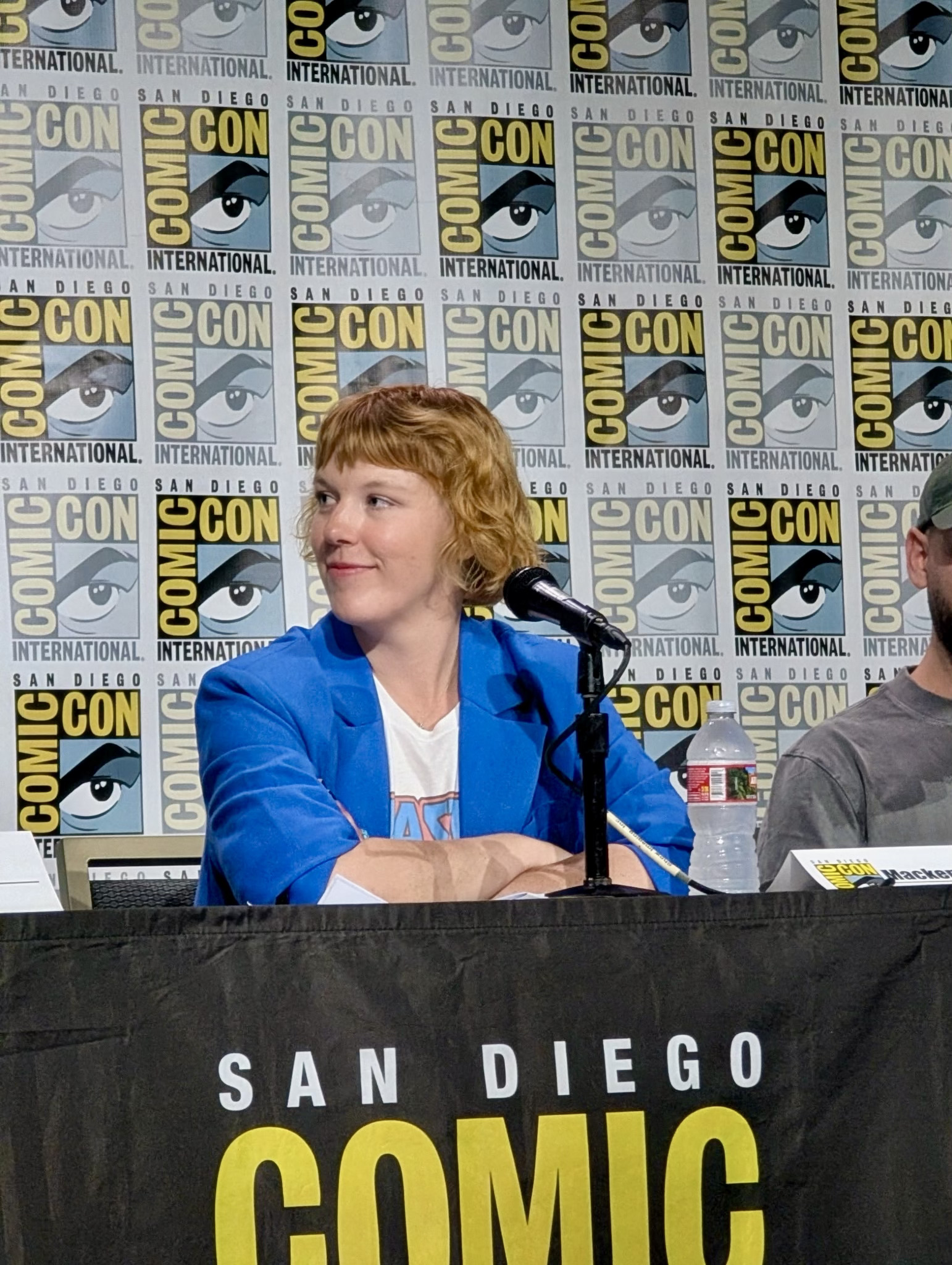
- Lee at San Diego Comic Con 2026
- Education: Simmons College (MFA)
- Writing career
- Genres: Historical fiction, non-fiction
- Website: mackenzilee.com

Mackenzi Lee (born Mackenzie Van Engelenhoven) is an American author of books for children and young adults. She writes both fiction and non-fiction about topics including sexuality and the role of women throughout history.

== Life and career ==
Lee has a Master of Fine Arts from Simmons University in writing for children and young adults.

Lee's first book, 2015's This Monstrous Thing, was a retelling of Frankenstein and earned Lee the Susan P. Bloom Children's Book Discovery Award. In the promotional period for this book, she began posting on Twitter under the hashtag #BygoneBadassBroads, sharing biographies of notable women beginning with Mary Shelley. This project grew in popularity, and in 2018, Lee published Bygone Badass Broads: 52 Forgotten Women Who Changed the World.

Her second novel, entitled The Gentleman's Guide to Vice and Virtue, was a New York Times Best Seller, won the New England Book Award and earned a Stonewall Book Award for its portrayal of bisexual young gentleman Henry "Monty" Montague in 18th-century Europe. This novel led to a series of books featuring the Montague siblings and a diverse set of characters whose struggles are presented in an era that didn't necessarily respect diversity. The second book in the series, The Lady’s Guide To Petticoats And Piracy, focused on Monty's sister Felicity Montague, a feminist and aspiring doctor. It was published in 2018 by HarperCollins. A short novella entitled The Gentleman's Guide to Getting Lucky, about Monty's romantic relationship established in The Gentleman's Guide to Vice and Virtue, was published in 2019. The third and final full-length novel in the series, The Nobleman's Guide to Scandal and Shipwrecks, was published in 2021, and follows Adrien Montague, the younger sibling of Monty and Felicity, as he searches for his older siblings.

Lee contracted with Marvel to write three historical fiction books featuring Marvel antiheroes, beginning with a story about Loki under the title Loki: Where Mischief Lies. In 2019, she also published The History of the World in 50 Dogs.

Lee is openly bisexual.

== Bibliography ==
- This Monstrous Thing (2015)
- Bygone Badass Broads: 52 Forgotten Women Who Changed the World (2018)
- All Out: The No-Longer-Secret Stories of Queer Teens throughout the Ages (contributing writer) (2018)
- The Radical Element: 12 Stories of Daredevils, Debutantes & Other Dauntless Girls (contributing writer) (2018)
- The History of the World in Fifty Dogs (2019)
- You Too?: 25 Voices Share Their #MeToo Stories (editor) (2020)
- From a Certain Point of View: The Empire Strikes Back (contributing writer) (2020)
- Lady Like (2025)

=== The Montague Siblings ===
- The Gentleman's Guide to Vice and Virtue (2017)
- The Lady's Guide to Petticoats and Piracy (2018)
- The Gentleman's Guide to Getting Lucky (2019)
- The Nobleman's Guide to Scandal and Shipwrecks (2021)

=== Marvel Comics ===
- Loki: Where Mischief Lies (2019)
- Gamora & Nebula: Sisters in Arms (2021)
- The Winter Soldier: Cold Front (2023)
