= Christopher Lane (novelist) =

American author

- Born: United States
- Occupation: Novelist
- Writing career
- Genre: Mystery

Christopher Lane is an American author whose books include the Inupiat Eskimo Mystery series.

== Bibliography ==
=== Inupiat Eskimo Mystery series ===
- Elements of a Kill, Avon (1998) ISBN 0-380-79870-0
- Season of Death, Avon (1999) ISBN 0-380-79872-7
- A Shroud of Midnight Sun, Avon (2000) ISBN 0-380-79873-5
- Silent as the Hunter, Avon (2001) ISBN 0-380-81625-3
- A Deadly Quiet, Avon (2001) ISBN 0-380-81626-1

=== Stand Alones ===
- Eden's Gate, Zondervan (1994) ISBN 0-310-41161-0
- Appearance of Evil, Zondervan (1997) ISBN 0-310-21567-6
- Tonopah, Zondervan (1999) ISBN 0-310-21568-4
