= Dawn Kurtagich =

Psychological horror and young adult fiction author

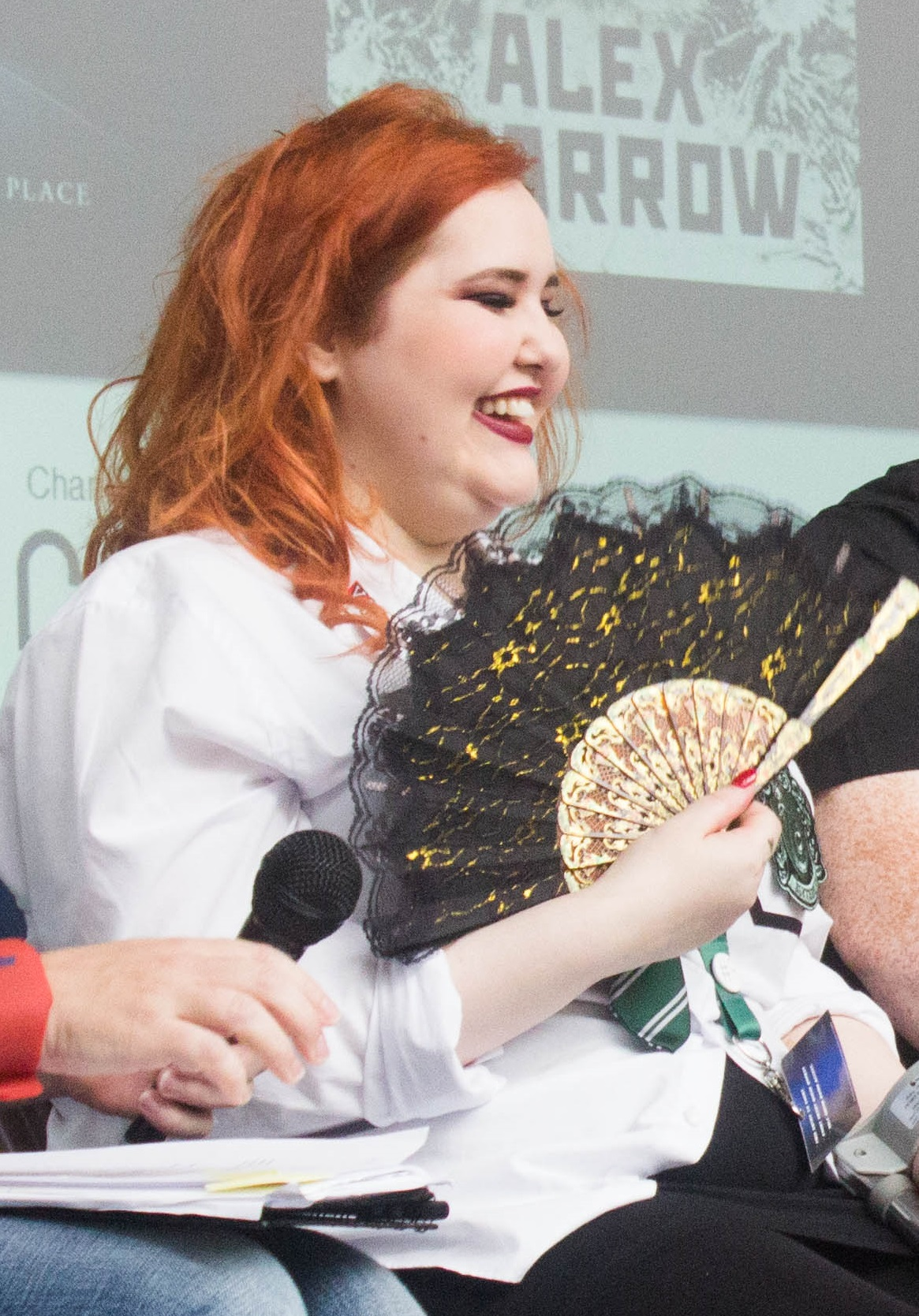
- Occupation: Writer
- Known for: Horror
- Website: https://www.dawnkurtagich.com/

Dawn Kurtagich (born 4 November 1986) is a psychological horror and young adult fiction author. She lives in Wales though she grew up in a number of places around the world, including mostly within South Africa. Her mother was single; a globe trotter and missionary. She attended fifteen schools within her school life (including places in South Africa and the UK). In 2012, whilst recovering from a liver transplant, she used that and her experience of someone she knew who had Dissociative Identity Disorder to write her first novel. That novel is described as Young Adult fiction but reviewers firmly place it as something for over fifteen year olds. A companion novella was produced to go with her first novel. Her adult debut, The Madness, was published in 2024, with three more novels following.

== Bibliography ==
- The Dead House
- And the Trees Crept In (US) / The Creeper Man (UK)
- Teeth in the Mist
- Blood on the Wind
- The Madness
- The Thorns
- The Seventh Sister
- The Wellness Retreat
