= Marc Thompson (voice actor) =

American voice actor

- Education: New York University
- Occupation: Voice actor
- Years active: 1997–present

Marc Thompson is an American voice actor who has worked for Konami Cross Media NY, NYAV Post and DuArt Film and Video. His most well-known role was in MTV's Daria (1997–2002), where he voiced numerous male characters including Kevin Thompson, Anthony DeMartino, and Timothy O'Neill. He is notable for voicing the titular character in Robocar Poli. He voices Casey Jones in the 2003 version of the Teenage Mutant Ninja Turtles cartoons and video games; and is also the voice of Tepig, Primeape, Gliscor, Krookodile, and Gengar in the Pokémon television series. He is the narrator of numerous Star Wars audio books including the Legacy of the Force and Fate of the Jedi series. He earned his BFA from New York University's Tisch School of the Arts in 1997.

== Filmography ==
=== Film ===
List of voice performances in animated films
Year	Title	Role	Notes	Source
2000	Is It Fall Yet?	Kevin Thompson, Anthony DeMartino, Timothy O'Neill, Charles "Upchuck" Ruttheimer III, Jamie White		
2002	Is It College Yet?	Kevin Thompson, Anthony DeMartino, Timothy O'Neill, Charles "Upchuck" Ruttheimer III, Jamie White		
2016	Yu-Gi-Oh! The Dark Side of Dimensions	Duke Devlin, Ryō Bakura's Father		
2024	Rebellious	Sea King		

=== Series ===
List of voice performances in animated series
Year	Title	Role	Notes	Source
1997–01	Daria	Kevin Thompson, Anthony DeMartino, Timothy O'Neill, Charles "Upchuck" Ruttheimer III, Jamie White		
2002	Hey Joel	Bill Wyman, Rolando		
2003	The Wrong Coast	Morpheus, William Shatner, Ti hua, Val Kilmer, others		
2003–09	Teenage Mutant Ninja Turtles	Casey Jones, Drako, Damiyo (Note: The official TMNT spells the name of the character as "Daimyo" but Thompson's website spells it as "Damiyo".), Uncle Augie, Serling		
2004–06, 2015, 2019	Winx Club	Knut, Brafilius	4Kids/Nickelodeon/3Beep English dubs	
2005–06	G.I. Joe: Sigma 6	Cobra Commander, Destro, Zartan, Kamakura, Spirit		
2006–09	Viva Piñata	Franklin Fizzlybear		
2006–07	Ellen's Acres	Dad		
2007–11	WordWorld	Shark, Robot and Turtle		
2007–09	Chaotic	Peyton, Chaor, H'earring, Najarin		
2008–10	Thumb Wrestling Federation	Bucks Gazillion, Steve, Cleat Cunningham, additional voices		
2009	Astonishing X-Men	Wolverine	Motion comic	
2009–12	Huntik: Secrets & Seekers	Dante Vale, Cherit, Santiago, Mallory, Stack, The Betrayer		
2011	Dinofroz	Bob	English dub	
2011	Shaktimaan: The Animated Series	Tick	English dub	
2011–23	Robocar Poli	Poli	English dub	
2013–21	The Crumpets	Pa	Distribimage version	
2013–16	Alisa Knows What to Do!			
2014–18	Super 4	Sharkbeard		
2015–24	Robin Hood: Mischief in Sherwood	Ralf		
2016–17	P. King Duckling	P. King Duckling		
2018	Birdboy: The Forgotten Children	False Dad		
2018	Oddbods	Santa Claus	Episode: "The Festive Menace"	
2018–21	Transformers: Cyberverse	Megatron, Megatron X, Jawsy, Red Five, Sky-Byte, Bug Bite, Soundblaster, Sludge, Tarn		
2019	Milo Murphy's Law	Additional Voices	Episode: "Look at This Ship/Cast Party"	
2021–22	Karma's World	Chef Scott Crowley		

=== Anime ===
List of dubbing performances in anime
Year	Title	Role	Notes	Source
2002	Yu-Gi-Oh! Duel Monsters	Duke Devlin, Valon, Rafael, Zigfreid von Schroeder, Aknamkanon, Gansley		
2002	Ultimate Muscle: The Kinnikuman Legacy	Eskara, Tyrannoclaw, Ramenman, Kid Muscle		
2003	Samurai Deeper Kyo	Haira		
2003	Sadamitsu the Destroyer	Gorinmaru		
2003	Shaman King	En Tao, Basil, Ados		
2004	F-Zero GP: Legend	Jack Levin, Bio Rex, Samurai Goroh		
2004	Gokusen	Hamaguchi, Ichiro Tsuruta		
2004	Shura no Toki: Age of Chaos	Yakumo Mutsu, Takato Mutsu, Izumi Mutsu, others		
2004	Seven of Seven	Mr. Handa		
2004	Shootfighter Tekken	Kikumura, others	OVA	
2004	Giant Robo	Taisou	NYAV Post dub	
2005	One Piece	Don Krieg	4Kids dub	
2005	Shadow Star Narutaru	Akira's father, Satoru, others		
2005	Gin Rei	Taisou	OVA	
2005	Magical DoReMi	Bo's father		
2005	Shingu: Secret of the Stellar Wars	Baku Morihaa, Weinul, Zaiglian Agent		
2005–07	Ah! My Goddess	Toraichi Tamiya, Professor Osawa, Almighty One, additional voices		
2005–08	Yu-Gi-Oh! GX	Dimitri, Prince Ojin, Chazz Princeton (episodes 90–180), The D, Mr. Huffington, Franz, Frost, Orlando, additional voices		
2006	Ninja Nonsense	Gomorrah		
2007	Phoenix	Sorceror, Father		
2007–10	Dinosaur King	Seth, Tommy K, Foolscap, Spartacus, Blackbeard, Zayid		
2008	Joe vs. Joe	Mr. Matsuda, Club Manager, others		
2008–2011	Yu-Gi-Oh! 5Ds	Hunter Pace, Hanson, Tenzen Yanagi, Sayer, Roman Goodwin, Dr. Schmidt, Mr. Izinski, Officer Kaz, Nicolas, Don Piero, Broder, Z-One		
2010	Slayers Evolution-R	Dun, Toppi, Shabranigdo		
2010–present	Pokémon	Tepig, Primeape, Gliscor, Sandile, Krokorok, Krookodile, Pignite, Geodude, Farfetch'd, Sirfetch'd		
2011-12	Tai Chi Chasers	Donha, Garnia, General Aidan, Elder Sid		
2011–15	Yu-Gi-Oh! Zexal	Astral, Number 96, Mr. Heartland, Donovan Crossit, Girag, Alito, Mayday Walker		
2015	Mobile Suit Gundam: The Origin	Degwin Sodo Zabi	Streaming released simultaneously with Japanese version	
2015–18	Yu-Gi-Oh! Arc-V	Frederick, Barret, Hunter Pace, Don Piero, Sergey Volkov, Captain Cutter, Sanders		
2018	Mazinger Z: Infinity	Baron Ashura (Male)		
2018–2021	Yu-Gi-Oh! VRAINS	Bishop, Shima Naoki, Frog, Flame		
2021	Shaman King	Ashil, Tao En, Muscle Punch	Netflix dub	
2021	Star Wars: Visions	Lan	Short film: Tatooine Rhapsody: Streaming released simultaneously with Japanese version	
2020–2022	Yu-Gi-Oh! Sevens	Yosh Imimi		
2022	Legend of the Galactic Heroes: The New Thesis - Clash	Lionel Morton		

=== Video games ===
List of voice performances in video games
Year	Title	Role	Notes	Source
2000	Daria's Inferno	Mr. Anthony DeMartino, Mr. Timothy O'Neill, Kevin Thompson, Jamie White		
2002	Farscape: The Game			
2003	Teenage Mutant Ninja Turtles	Casey Jones		
2004	Airforce Delta Strike	Various characters		
2004	Galactic Wrestling	Kid Muscle, Eskara, Tyrannoclaw, Ramenman		
2004	Teenage Mutant Ninja Turtles 2: Battle Nexus	Casey Jones		
2004	Galactic Wrestling	Kid Muscle, Eskara, Tyrannoclaw, Ramenman		
2005	One Piece: Pirates Carnival	Don Krieg		
2005	Teenage Mutant Ninja Turtles: Mutant Melee	Casey Jones, Drako		
2005	Winx Club	Knut, Voice in the Cave		
2006	Shadow Hearts: From the New World	Frank Goldfinger, Mao, and Al Capone		
2009	Teenage Mutant Ninja Turtles: Smash-Up	Casey Jones		
2012	PokéPark 2: Wonders Beyond	Tepig		
2017	Yu-Gi-Oh! Duel Links	Chazz Princeton, Astral, Duke Devlin, Brave Battler, Girag, Z-one		
2021	Pathfinder: Wrath of the Righteous	Paralictor Regill		
2022	The Tale of Bistun	Narrator		

=== Audiobooks ===
List of audio books narrated
Year	Title	Author	Notes	Source
2007	Star Wars: Legacy of the Force: Betrayal	Aaron Allston	Book 1 in the Legacy of the Force series. Now part of the non-canonical Star Wars Legends universe.	
2007	Star Wars: Legacy of the Force: Bloodlines	Karen Traviss	Book 2 in the Legacy of the Force series. Now part of the non-canonical Star Wars Legends universe.	
2007	Star Wars: Legacy of the Force: Tempest	Troy Denning	Book 3 in the Legacy of the Force series. Now part of the non-canonical Star Wars Legends universe.	
2007	Star Wars: Legacy of the Force: Exile	Aaron Allston	Book 4 in the Legacy of the Force series. Now part of the non-canonical Star Wars Legends universe.	
2007	Star Wars: Legacy of the Force: Sacrifice	Karen Traviss	Book 5 in the Legacy of the Force series. Now part of the non-canonical Star Wars Legends universe.	
2007	Star Wars: Legacy of the Force: Inferno	Troy Denning	Book 6 in the Legacy of the Force series. Now part of the non-canonical Star Wars Legends universe.	
2007	Star Wars: Legacy of the Force: Fury	Aaron Allston	Book 7 in the Legacy of the Force series. Now part of the non-canonical Star Wars Legends universe.	
2008	Star Wars: Legacy of the Force: Revelation	Karen Traviss	Book 8 in the Legacy of the Force series. Now part of the non-canonical Star Wars Legends universe.	
2008	Star Wars: Legacy of the Force: Invincible	Troy Denning	Book 9 in the Legacy of the Force series. Now part of the non-canonical Star Wars Legends universe.	
2008	Star Wars: Millennium Falcon	James Luceno	Now part of the non-canonical Star Wars Legends universe.	
2008	Goosebumps HorrorLand: Dr. Maniac vs. Robby Schwartz	R. L. Stine	Book 5 in the Goosebumps HorrorLand series.	
2009	Star Wars: Fate of the Jedi: Outcast	Aaron Allston	Book 1 in the Star Wars: Fate of the Jedi series. Now part of the non-canonical Star Wars Legends universe.	
2009	Star Wars: Fate of the Jedi: Omen	Christie Golden	Book 2 in the Star Wars: Fate of the Jedi series. Now part of the non-canonical Star Wars Legends universe.	
2009	Escape to Witch Mountain	Alexander Key		
2009	Star Wars: Fate of the Jedi: Abyss	Troy Denning	Book 3 in the Star Wars: Fate of the Jedi series. Now part of the non-canonical Star Wars Legends universe.	
2009	Bran Hambric: The Farfield Curse	Kaleb Nation		
2009	I am a Genius of Unspeakable Evil and I Want to be Your Class President	Josh Lieb		
2009	Goosebumps HorrorLand: Streets of Panic Park	R. L. Stine	Book 12 in the Goosebumps HorrorLand series.	
2009	Dragon's Blood	Jane Yolen	Book 1 in The Pit Dragon Chronicles series.	
2009	Heart's Blood	Jane Yolen	Book 2 in The Pit Dragon Chronicles series.	
2009	A Sending of Dragons	Jane Yolen	Book 3 in The Pit Dragon Chronicles series.	
2009	Dragon's Heart	Jane Yolen	Book 4 in The Pit Dragon Chronicles series.	
2010	The Adventures of Word Girl Collection	Annie Auerbach	Also narrated by Donna Feingold	
2010	Star Wars: Fate of the Jedi: Backlash	Aaron Allston	Book 4 in the Star Wars: Fate of the Jedi series. Now part of the non-canonical Star Wars Legends universe.	
2010	Star Wars: Fate of the Jedi: Allies	Christie Golden	Book 5 in the Star Wars: Fate of the Jedi series. Now part of the non-canonical Star Wars Legends universe.	
2010	Star Wars: The Old Republic: Fatal Alliance	Sean Williams	Book 1 of the Star Wars: The Old Republic series. Now part of the non-canonical Star Wars Legends universe.	
2010	Bran Hambric: The Specter Key	Kaleb Nation		
2010	The Clockwork Three	Matthew J. Kirby		
2010	Star Wars: LegendsStar Wars: Fate of the Jedi: Vortex	Troy Denning	Book 6 in the Star Wars: Fate of the Jedi series. Now part of the non-canonical Star Wars Legends universe.	
2011	Star Wars: The Old Republic: Deceived	Paul S. Kemp	Book 2 of the Star Wars: The Old Republic series. Now part of the non-canonical Star Wars Legends universe.	
2011	Star Wars: Fate of the Jedi: Conviction	Aaron Allston	Book 7 in the Star Wars: Fate of the Jedi series. Now part of the non-canonical Star Wars Legends universe.	
2011	Star Wars: Fate of the Jedi: Ascension	Christie Golden	Book 8 in the Star Wars: Fate of the Jedi series. Now part of the non-canonical Star Wars Legends universe.	
2011	The Astonishing Secret of Awesome Man	Michael Chabon		
2011	Star Wars: Heir to the Empire	Timothy Zahn	Book 1 of the Thrawn trilogy series. Now part of the non-canonical Star Wars Legends universe.	
2011	Star Wars: The Old Republic: Revan	Drew Karpyshyn	Book 3 of the Star Wars: The Old Republic series. Now part of the non-canonical Star Wars Legends universe.	
2011	Star Wars: Fate of the Jedi: Apocalypse	Troy Denning	Book 9 in the Star Wars: Fate of the Jedi series. Now part of the non-canonical Star Wars Legends universe.	
2012	Star Wars: Dark Force Rising	Timothy Zahn	Book 2 of the Thrawn trilogy series. Now part of the non-canonical Star Wars Legends universe.	
2012	Star Wars: The Last Command	Timothy Zahn	Book 3 of the Thrawn trilogy series. Now part of the non-canonical Star Wars Legends universe.	
2012	Star Wars: The Old Republic: Annihilation	Drew Karpyshyn	Book 4 of the Star Wars: The Old Republic series. Now part of the non-canonical Star Wars Legends universe.	
2013	Star Wars: X-Wing: Mercy Kill	Aaron Allston	Book 10 of the Star Wars: X-Wing series. Now part of the non-canonical Star Wars Legends universe.	
2013	Star Wars: Scoundrels	Timothy Zahn	Now part of the non-canonical Star Wars Legends universe.	
2013	Star Wars: Allegiance	Timothy Zahn	Now part of the non-canonical Star Wars Legends universe.	
2013	Star Wars: Crucible	Troy Denning	Now part of the non-canonical Star Wars Legends universe.	
2013	Star Wars: Specter of the Past	Timothy Zahn	Book 1 of The Hand of Thrawn series. Now part of the non-canonical Star Wars Legends universe.	
2013	William Shakespeare's Star Wars	Ian Doescher	Book 3 of the William Shakespeare's Star Wars trilogy series. Now part of the non-canonical Star Wars Legends universe. Also narrated by Daniel Davis, Jonathan Davis, Ian Doescher, Jeff Gurner, and January LaVoy.	
2013	Star Wars: Vision of the Future	Timothy Zahn	Book 2 of The Hand of Thrawn series. Now part of the non-canonical Star Wars Legends universe.	
2014	Star Wars: Honor Among Thieves	James S. A. Corey	Book 2 of the Star Wars: Empire and Rebellion series. Now part of the non-canonical Star Wars Legends universe. Also narrated by Ilyana Kadushin.	
2014	William Shakespeare's The Empire Striketh Back	Ian Doescher	Book 2 of the William Shakespeare's Star Wars trilogy series. Now part of the non-canonical Star Wars Legends universe. Also narrated by Daniel Davis, Jonathan Davis, Ian Doescher, Jeff Gurner, and January LaVoy.	
2014	William Shakespeare's The Jedi Doth Return	Ian Doescher	Book 3 of the William Shakespeare's Star Wars trilogy series. Now part of the non-canonical Star Wars Legends universe. Also narrated by Daniel Davis, Jonathan Davis, Ian Doescher, Jeff Gurner, and January LaVoy.	
2014	Star Wars: A New Dawn	John Jackson Miller		
2015	Star Wars: Heir to the Jedi	Kevin Hearne		
2015	Wisdom From Women in the Bible	John C. Maxwell		
2015	Star Wars: Dark Disciple	Christie Golden	Katie Lucas narrates her foreword	
2015	Star Wars: Smuggler's Run: A Han Solo & Chewbacca Adventure	Greg Rucka	Part of the Journey to Star Wars: The Force Awakens series.	
2015	Star Wars: Aftermath	Chuck Wendig	Book 1 of the Star Wars: Aftermath series. Part of the Journey to Star Wars: The Force Awakens series.	
2015	Star Wars: A New Hope: The Princess, the Scoundrel, and the Farm Boy	Alexandra Bracken	Also narrated by Rebecca Soler	
2015	Star Wars: The Empire Strikes Back: So You Want to Be a Jedi?	Adam Gidwitz		
2015	Star Wars: Return of the Jedi: Beware the Power of the Dark Side!	Tom Angleberger		
2016	Star Wars: Aftermath: Life Debt	Chuck Wendig	Book 2 of the Star Wars: Aftermath series.	
2016	Kubo and the Two Strings: The Junior Novel	Sadie Chesterfield		
2016	Nimona	ND Stevenson	Also narrated by Jonathan Davis and Rebecca Soler	
2017	Star Wars: Aftermath: Empire's End	Chuck Wendig	Book 3 of the Star Wars: Aftermath series.	
2017	Star Wars: Thrawn	Timothy Zahn	Book 1 of the Thrawn origin series.	
2017	Star Wars: Canto Bight	Mira Grant, Rae Carson, Saladin Ahmed, John Jackson Miller	Part of the Journey to Star Wars: The Last Jedi series. A collection of short stories. Also narrated by Jonathan Davis, Sean Kenin, and Saskia Maarleveld.	
2017	Shahnameh	Ferdowsi	Includes an introduction by Francis Ford Coppola	
2018	Abraham Lincoln, Pro Wrestler	Steve Sheinkin	Book 1 of the Time Twisters series	
2018	Abigail Adams, Pirate of the Caribbean	Steve Sheinkin	Book 2 of the Time Twisters series	
2018	Star Wars: Thrawn: Alliances	Timothy Zahn	Book 2 of the Thrawn origin series.	
2019	Katt vs. Dogg (Jimmy Patterson)	James Patterson, Chris Grabenstein	Book 1 of the Katt vs. Dogg series	
2019	Avengers: Infinity War: Destiny Arrives	Liza Palmer		
2019	Star Wars: Thrawn: Treason	Timothy Zahn	Book 3 of the Thrawn origin series.	
2019	Star Wars: Resistance Reborn	Rebecca Roanhorse		
2020	Star Wars: Thrawn Ascendancy: Chaos Rising	Timothy Zahn	Book 1 of the Thrawn Ascendancy series.	
2021	Katt Loves Dogg (Jimmy Patterson)	James Patterson, Chris Grabenstein	Book 2 of the Katt Vs. Dogg series	
2021	Scaredy Cat (Jimmy Patterson)	James Patterson, Chris Grabenstein		
2021	Star Wars: Thrawn Ascendancy: Greater Good	Timothy Zahn	Book 2 of the Thrawn Ascendancy series.	
2021	Star Wars: The Rising Storm	Cavan Scott	Book 1 of the Star Wars: The High Republic series.	
2021	Star Wars: Tempest Runner	Cavan Scott	Book 2 of the Star Wars: The High Republic series.	
2021	Star Wars: Rogue Squadron	Michael A. Stackpole	Book 1 of Star Wars Legends: X-Wing series.	
2021	Star Wars: Thrawn Ascendancy: Lesser Evil	Timothy Zahn	Book 3 of the Thrawn Ascendancy series.	
2022	Star Wars: The Fallen Star	Claudia Gray	Book 3 of the Star Wars: The High Republic series.	
2022	The Icarus Hunt	Timothy Zahn		
2022	Max and the Midknights: The Tower of Time	Lincoln Peirce	Book 3 of the Max & the Midknights series.	
2022	Star Wars: Wedge's Gamble	Michael A. Stackpole	Book 2 of Star Wars Legends: X-Wing series.	
2022	Creative Strategy and the Business of Design	Douglas Davis		
2022	The Icarus Plot	Timothy Zahn		
2022	Star Wars: The Krytos Trap	Michael A. Stackpole	Book 3 of Star Wars Legends: X-Wing series.	
2022	Star Wars: The Bacta War	Michael A. Stackpole	Book 4 of Star Wars Legends: X-Wing series.	
2024	Star Wars: Wraith Squadron	Aaron Allston	Book 5 of Star Wars Legends: X-Wing series	
2024	Star Wars: Iron Fist	Aaron Allston	Book 6 of Star Wars Legends: X-Wing series	
2024	Star Wars: Solo Command	Aaron Allston	Book 7 of Star Wars Legends: X-Wing series	
2025	Kingdom Come	Mark Waid, Alex Ross, Dirk Maggs		
2025	Star Wars: Master of Evil	Adam Christopher		
2025	Star Wars: Sanctuary	Lamar Giles		
2025	All-Star Superman	Grant Morrison		
2025	Star Wars: Trials of the Jedi (The High Republic)	Charles Soule		
2025	Star Wars: Dark Lord: The Rise of Darth Vader	James Luceno	Part of the non-canonical Star Wars Legends universe.	
