= January LaVoy =

American actress

- Born: Trumbull, Connecticut, U.S.
- Education: Fairfield University (BA); National Theatre Conservatory (MFA)
- Occupations: Television actress Theater actress Voice acting
- Spouses: Mat Hostetler (2011–2019); Will Damron (2022–present)
- Awards: Audie Award for Fantasy (2020); Audie Award for Middle Grade Title (2020); Audie Award for Multi-Voiced Performance (2022); Audie Award for Young Adult Title (2016); Audie Award for Young Listeners' Title (2017, 2019)
- Website: januarylavoy.com

January LaVoy (born in Trumbull, Connecticut) is an American actress and audiobook narrator. As an actress, she is most recognized as Noelle Ortiz on the ABC daytime drama One Life to Live. LaVoy made her Broadway debut in the Broadway premiere of the play Enron at the Broadhurst Theatre on April 27, 2010.

As an audiobook narrator, she has received five Audie Awards and been a finalist for nineteen. In 2013, she won Publishers Weekly's Listen Up Award for Audiobook Narrator of the Year. In 2019, AudioFile named her a Golden Voice narrator.

== Personal life ==
LaVoy married Mat Hostetler on September 4, 2011. They divorced in 2019, and she married fellow narrator and author Will Damron in 2022. They reside in Atlanta, Georgia.

== Education ==
LaVoy received her Bachelor of Arts degree in Theater from Fairfield University in Fairfield, Connecticut, where she was a member of Theatre Fairfield, the resident production company. She received her Master in Fine Arts degree from the National Theatre Conservatory at the Denver Center for the Performing Arts in Colorado.

== Career ==
=== Theatre credits ===
In the fall of 2012, LaVoy created the character of Lena in the world premiere of Pearl Cleage's What I Learned in Paris at the Alliance Theatre in Atlanta, Georgia. Her work has been seen in regional theatres across America, including the Denver Center Theatre Company, Pittsburgh's City Theatre and Public Theater, CATF in Shepherdstown, West Virginia, Philadelphia's Wilma Theater, and the Shakespeare Theatre of New Jersey. LaVoy played the character Risa in the 2007 Lucille Lortel Award-winning play, Two Trains Running. She received the 2004 Denver Post Ovation Award, as Best Actress, for her portrayal of Portia in the Denver Center Theatre Company's production of Shakespeare's The Merchant of Venice.

LaVoy played the role of Helen Keller in the play, Helen Keller Speaks, performed first on March 14, 2009, at the Regina A. Quick Center for the Arts at Fairfield University in Connecticut. The play was written by John Orman, a professor of politics at Fairfield University and a former teacher of LaVoy's. The play captures the social activist views of Keller based on her documented speeches and letters between 1913 and 1919.

LaVoy was featured in Signature Theatre Company's Off-Broadway production of Samm-Art Williams' Home playing Woman One/Pattie Mae Wells, as well as productions of Adrienne Kennedy's Funnyhouse of a Negro, and the world premiere of Will Eno's Wakey, Wakey alongside emmy winner Michael Emerson. She also performed in the world premiere of the musical Coraline at the MCC Theater. She shares a 2019 Lucille Lortel nomination for Outstanding Play with The Mad Ones, Phillip James Brannon, Brad Heberlee, and Carmen M. Herlihy. In 2022, LaVoy was nominated for two Helen Hayes awards -- Outstanding Lead Performer in a Play, and Outstanding Direction in a Play (co-nominated with Adam Immervahr) for her work in Anna Deavere Smith's Fires in the Mirror at Theater J.

=== Television and film credits ===
In addition to her role on One Life to Live, LaVoy has been seen on Law & Order (including the SVU and Criminal Intent franchises), All My Children, Guiding Light, and 3 Lbs.. Guest star appearances include Elementary, NOS4A2, and Blue Bloods. She also appeared in Steven Spielberg's War of the Worlds and the short film High Ground.

=== Voiceover and audiobooks ===
LaVoy has voiced many national commercials, including for Toll House, Revlon, Home Depot, Danone, and UnitedHealth Group.

In 2008, she recorded her first audiobook under a pseudonym because she feared the work may interfere with her roles on soap operas. Since then, she has recorded dozens of audiobooks for publishing houses such as Random House, Simon & Schuster, Hachette, Penguin Audio, and Macmillan Audio, including the following:

- Version Control by Dexter Palmer
- The Diviners series by Libba Bray
- 11th Hour by James Patterson and Maxine Paetro
- 12th of Never by James Patterson and Maxine Paetro
- Private Berlin by James Patterson and Mark T. Sullivan (Co-read with Ari Fliakos)
- Guilty Wives by James Patterson and David Ellis
- Invisible by James Patterson and David Ellis
- Women's Murder Club series by James Patterson and various authors (book 11 onwards)
- If I'm Dead by Marcia Clark
- Guilt By Association by Marcia Clark
- Guilt By Degrees by Marcia Clark
- Killer Ambition by Marcia Clark
- Sweet Valley Confidential by Francine Pascal
- Triangles by Ellen Hopkins
- Dreams of the Dead by Perri O'Shaughnessy
- Skinnydipping by Bethenny Frankel
- Shadow Show - inspired by Ray Bradbury
- The Bridge by Karen Kingsbury
- The Beginning by Karen Kingsbury
- The Chance by Karen Kingsbury
- Angels Walking series by Karen Kingsbury (Co-read with Kirby Heyborne)
- The Baxters series by Karen Kingsbury (Co-read with Kirby Heyborne)
- A Distant Shore by Karen Kingsbury (Co-read with Kirby Heyborne)
- Thief River Falls by Brian Freeman
- The Deep, Deep Snow by Brian Freeman
- The Third Twin by Ken Follett
- The Hammer of Eden by Ken Follett
- The Liar by Nora Roberts
- Shelter in Place by Nora Roberts
- Under Currents by Nora Roberts
- Hideaway by Nora Roberts
- Legacy by Nora Roberts
- The Longest Ride by Nicholas Sparks (Co-read with Ron McLarty)
- I've Got My Eyes on You by Mary Higgins Clark
- You Don't Own Me by Mary Higgins Clark
- Kiss the Girls and Make Them Cry by Mary Higgins Clark
- Piece of My Heart by Mary Higgins Clark
- Star Wars: Dawn of the Jedi: Into the Void by Tim Lebbon
- Star Wars: Bloodline by Claudia Gray
- Star Wars: Phasma by Delilah S. Dawson
- Missing You by Harlan Coben
- Fool Me Once by Harlan Coben
- Agenda 21 by Glenn Beck and Harriet Parke
- Agenda 21: Into the Shadows by Glenn Beck and Harriet Parke
- Camino Island by John Grisham
- Dear Ijeawele, or A Feminist Manifesto in Fifteen Suggestions by Chimamanda Ngozi Adichie
- Accused by Lisa Scottoline
- Daisy Jones & The Six by Taylor Jenkins Reid (Narrated by a full cast. LaVoy played the character, Camila Dunne)
- The Gifted School by Bruce Holsinger
- The Ten Thousand Doors of January by Alix E. Harrow
- The Re-Do List by Denise Williams (Co-read with Teddy Hamilton)

== Awards and honors ==
=== Awards ===
Year	Title	Award	Result	Ref.
2013	The Diviners by Libba Bray	Amazing Audiobooks for Young Adults	Top 10	
2013	The Diviners by Libba Bray	Audie Award for Teens	Finalist	
2013	The Diviners by Libba Bray	Listen Up Award for Fiction	Finalist	
2013	The Diviners by Libba Bray	Listen Up Award for YA/Children's	Finalist	
2013	The Diviners by Libba Bray; The Kill Room by Jeffery Deaver	Listen Up Award for Audiobook Narrator of the Year	Winner	
2013	The Kill Room by Jeffery Deaver	Listen Up Award for Fiction	Finalist	
2014	The Longest Ride by Nicholas Sparks	Audie Award for Romance	Finalist	
2014	William Shakespeare’s Star Wars by Ian Doescher	Audie Award for Multi-Voiced Performance	Finalist	
2015	Faceoff by Linwood Barclay et al.	Audie Award for Short Stories or Collections	Finalist	
2015	Missing You by Harlan Coben	Audie Award for Mystery	Finalist	
2015	William Shakespeare’s Star Wars by Ian Doescher	Amazing Audiobooks for Young Adults	Top 10	
2016	Lair of Dreams (2015) by Libba Bray	Amazing Audiobooks for Young Adults	Top 10	
2016	Lair of Dreams (2015) by Libba Bray	Audie Award for Best Female Narrator	Finalist	
2016	Lair of Dreams (2015) by Libba Bray	Audie Award for Young Adult Title	Winner	
2017	28 Days: Moments in Black History That Changed the World	Audie Award for Young Listeners' Title	Winner	
2017	Nimona (2016) by ND Stevenson	Amazing Audiobooks for Young Adults	Top 10	
2017	Nimona (2016) by ND Stevenson	Odyssey Award	Honor	
2018	Before the Devil Breaks You by Libba Bray	Audie Award for Young Adult Title	Finalist	
2018	Bette & Joan: The Divine Feud by Shaun Considine	Audie Award for History or Biography	Finalist	
2018	My Life, My Love, My Legacy (2017) by Coretta Scott King as told to Rev. Dr. Barbara Reynolds	Audie Award for History or Biography	Finalist	
2018	Mother Go by James Patrick Kelly	Audie Award for Original Work	Finalist	
2019	Any Man by Amber Tamblyn	Audie Award for Multi-Voiced Performance	Finalist	
2019	Before She Was Harriet (2017) by Lesa Cline-Ransome	Audie Award for Young Listeners' Title	Winner	
2019	Courage to Be Disliked by Ichiro Kishimi and Fumitake Koga	Audie Award for Business and Personal Development	Finalist	
2020	Birthday Suit by Lauren Blakely	Audie Award for Audio Drama	Finalist	
2020	Charlotte's Web (1952) by E. B. White	Audie Award for Audiobook of the Year	Finalist	
2020	Charlotte's Web (1952) by E. B. White	Audie Award for Middle Grade	Winner	
2020	Dooku: Jedi Lost by Cavan Scott	Audie Award for Multi-Voiced Performance	Finalist	
2020	The Queen by Josh Levin	Audie Award for History or Biography	Finalist	
2020	The Ten Thousand Doors of January (2019) by Alix E. Harrow	Audie Award for Best Female Narrator	Finalist	
2020	The Ten Thousand Doors of January (2019) by Alix E. Harrow	Audie Award for Fantasy	Winner	
2022	Class Act by Jerry Craft	Audie Award for Middle Grade Title	Finalist	
2022	Four Hundred Souls (2021), edited by Ibram X. Kendi and Keisha N. Blain	Audie Award for Multi-Voiced Performance	Finalist	
2023	The 1619 Project: A New Origin Story (2021) by Nikole Hannah-Jones and The New York Times Magazine, edited by Caitlin Roper, Ilena Silverman, and Jake Silverstein	Audie Award for Audiobook of the Year	Finalist	
2023	The 1619 Project: A New Origin Story (2021) by Nikole Hannah-Jones and The New York Times Magazine, edited by Caitlin Roper, Ilena Silverman, and Jake Silverstein	Audie Award for Multi-Voiced Performance	Finalist	
2023	The Extraordinary Life of an Ordinary Man by Paul Newman, edited by David Rosenthall	Audie Award for Autobiography or Memoir	Finalist	
2023	Sparring Partners by John Grisham	Audie Award for Multi-Voiced Performance	Winner	
2023	Thistlefoot by GennaRose Nethercott	Audie Award for Best Female Narrator	Finalist	
2024	Twelve Dinging Doorbells by Tameka Fryer Brown	Audie Award for Young Listeners' Title	Finalist	

=== "Best of" lists ===
Year	Title	List	Ref.
2014	Missing You (2014) by Harlan Coben	AudioFile Best of Mystery & Suspense	
2014	The Competition (2014) by Marcia Clark	AudioFile Best of Mystery & Suspense	
2015	Lair of Dreams (2015) by Libba Bray	AudioFile Best of Young Adult	
2016	Version Control (2016) by Dexter Palmer	AudioFile Best of Science Fiction & Fantasy	
2016	Journey to Star Wars: The Force Awakens Moving Target: A Princess Leia Adventure by Cecil Castellucci and Jason Fry	Amazing Audiobooks for Young Adults	
2017	The Meaning of Michelle (2017), edited by Veronica Chambers	AudioFile Best of NonFiction & Culture	
2017	Camino Island (2017) by John Grisham	AudioFile Best of Mystery & Suspense	
2017	My Life, My Love, My Legacy (2017) by Coretta Scott King as told to Rev. Dr. Barbara Reynolds	AudioFile Best of Memoir	
2018	Before She Was Harriet (2017) by Lesa Cline-Ransome	Booklist's Audio Stars for Youth	
2018	Hope Nation (2018), edited by Rose Brock	AudioFile Best of Young Adult	
2018	Unicorn Rescue Society, Books 1–2: The Creature of the Pines and The Basque Dragon by (2018) Christopher Smith and others	Booklist's Audio Stars for Youth	
2019	Before She Was Harriet (2017) by Lesa Cline-Ransome	ALSC's Notable Children's Recordings	
2019	Charlotte's Web (1952) by E. B. White	AudioFile Best of Children & Family Listening	
2019	Daisy Jones & The Six (2019) by Taylor Jenkins Reid	AudioFile Best of Fiction, Poetry & Horror	
2019	Eliza Hamilton (2018) by Tilar J. Mazzeo	AudioFile Best of Biography	
2019	Look Both Ways (2019) by Jason Reynolds	AudioFile Best of Children & Family Listening	
2019	The Ten Thousand Doors of January (2019) by Alix E. Harrow	AudioFile Best of Sci-Fi, Fantasy & Horror	
2019	Trailblazer (2019) by Dorothy Butler Gilliam	AudioFile Best of Memoir	
2020	Charlotte's Web (1952) by E. B. White	ALSC's Notable Children's Recordings	
2020	Unicorn Rescue Society, Books 1–2: The Creature of the Pines and The Basque Dragon (2018) by Christopher Smith and others	Booklists Top 10 SF/Fantasy & Horror Audiobooks for Youth	
2021	Four Hundred Souls (2021), edited by Ibram X. Kendi and Keisha N. Blain	AudioFile Best of History & Biography	
2021	King of Crows by Libba Bray	Amazing Audiobooks for Young Adults	
2021	Red Hood by Elana K. Arnold	Amazing Audiobooks for Young Adults	
2022	Class Act by Jerry Craft	Amazing Audiobooks for Young Adults	
2022	Unspeakable: The Tulsa Race Massacre (2021) by Carole Boston Weatherford	Amazing Audiobooks for Young Adults	
