= National Theatre Conservatory =

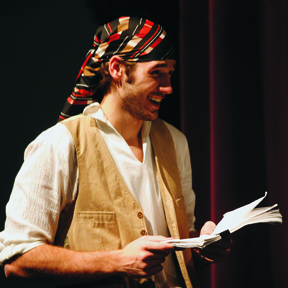
- Type: Graduate acting school
- Active: 1935–June 2012
- Students: 24
- Location: Denver, Colorado, United States
- Campus: Denver Performing Arts Complex
- Website: Official website

The National Theatre Conservatory was a three-year graduate acting school that in its last three decades was part of the Denver Center for the Performing Arts. It was founded in 1935 in New York as the only congressionally chartered MFA program in U.S. history.

Originally named the American National Theatre and Academy, the school operated its own Broadway venue for its last 30 years in New York at what is now the August Wilson Theatre. In 1984 when it ran into financial difficulties, Denver Center founder Donald Seawell transferred the charter and remaining resources to Denver and reopened it as the National Theater Conservatory MFA program. The school closed in June 2012 after graduating eight final students.

At the program's height, twenty-four students performed alongside the Tony Award-winning Denver Center Theatre Company in a 10-play season. With a 3:1 student/teacher ratio and guest instructors including Edward Albee, Sir Peter Hall and Bill Pullman, students earned a Master of Fine Arts degree in Acting and an Actor's Equity membership.

Its mission was to provide gifted students from across the nation the opportunity to develop their talents and skills within the challenging environment of a performing arts center and to prepare them for active careers in the American theatre and in the film and television industries. The National Theatre Conservatory's MFA training program was designed to bring all students closer to the realization of their potential while steadily developing insights, attitudes, standards and disciplines that will nourish them for the rest of their creative lives.

Consistently ranked as one of the top ten schools of its kind in the United States, the National Theatre Conservatory admitted 8 students per year from nearly 600 applicants. After three years, graduates emerge with the skills required for a professional career. Because the NTC believed in each student's ability and potential, a full three-year tuition scholarship and a weekly stipend was offered.

The Actor Training Program prepared students for full careers in the performing arts, including house management, fundraising, marketing, event planning and press relations. Performances by students in studio productions were scheduled to enable the artists, artisans and staff of the Denver Center for the Performing Arts to attend. During the latter half of the second year, students spent a portion of their time apprenticed to the Denver Center Theatre Company.

Entrance into the third and final year began a full-time apprenticeship with the Theatre Company where students participated more fully in rehearsals and performances of the company. After completion of the apprenticeship, students were featured in their own fully produced mainstage productions. Known as the NTC Rep, these two plays were performed alternately throughout a three-week period in The Conservatory Theatre. Following the NTC Rep, the students graduated and traveled to New York for a Showcase performance in front of agents and casting directors.

Graduates working throughout the United States January LaVoy, Julia Pace Mitchell, Sarah Wayne Callies and many others.

Guest instructors often provided the students with additional insight into their future careers. These visiting artists included John Barton, Israel Hicks, Hal Holbrook, Jamie Horton, Terrence McNally, Marion Ross, Patrick Stewart and Anthony Zerbe among many others.
