= List of Robocar Poli episodes =

Robocar Poli (Korean: 로보카 폴리; RR: Roboka Polli) is a South Korean animated children's television series created by RoiVisual, Educational Broadcasting System, Hyundai Motors, Benex Investment and Korea Creative Content Agency. The series premiered on February 28, 2011, on Educational Broadcasting System, and 120 episodes have aired over five seasons (26 per season). Each of the episodes is normally 14 (11 if you're not counting into or outro) minutes long.

== Series overview ==
Season	Episodes	Originally released	
Season	Episodes	First released	Last released
1	26	February 28, 2011	July 12, 2011
2	26	December 26, 2011	May 15, 2012
3	26	February 26, 2014	May 22, 2014
4	26	August 31, 2015	November 24, 2015
5	16	March 4, 2022	December 13, 2022

== Episodes ==
=== Season 1 (2011) ===
Season 1 began on February 28 (with "Rescue Team of Brooms Town"), and ended on July 12, 2011 (with "Our New Friend, Whooper"). It contains 26 episodes.

No. overall	No. in season	Title	Directed by	Written by	Storyboard by	Original release date
1	1	"Rescue Team of Brooms Town"	Lee Dong-woo	Eom Jun-yeong	Kim Seon-goo	February 28, 2011
When Terry the trailer bumps into a mooring post at the dock and drives away unaware that his brakes are out, the Rescue Team tries to intercept him.
2	2	"School B's Present"	Lee Dong-woo	Eom Jun-yeong	Kim Seon-goo	February 2011
School B is late and he is worried about the children who are waiting for him. He looks for a shortcut. However, every road is blocked because of roadwork. Although he reaches the shore road, he has to turn around since this one is also blocked. When he turns around, he hits the guard rail and is about to fall down the cliff! Will the Rescue Team save him from falling?
3	3	"Concrete Fuss"	Lee Dong-woo	Eom Jun-yeong	Kim Seon-goo	March 7, 2011
Mr. Builder starts repairing the water pipes. He warns Bruner to guard the place until the concrete dries out after pouring the cement into the hole. When Mr. Builder gives warnings, Bruner is occupied with playing ball and does not pay attention. Because of this, Bruner falls into the concrete. Can the Rescue Team pull Bruner out of the concrete?
4	4	"New Friends"	Lee Dong-woo	Eom Jun-yeong	Kim Seon-goo	March 8, 2011
Cleany is a narrow minded and quiet guy. But one day, a little cat with an injury is found. The Rescue Team asks Cleany to look after the cat until they find the owner. Cleany becomes so attached to the cat that he lies that he lost the cat when he is told that the Rescue Team found the owner.
5	5	"Regular Checkup Day"	Lee Dong-woo	Eom Jun-yeong	Kim Seon-goo	March 14, 2011
Today is the Regular Checkup Day. Spooky (a Mater like tow truck) is too lazy to have a regular checkup. When Spooky comes to tow Posty to the electronic recharge station, fire comes out of Spooky's nose. The fire then spreads to the ground and fence. Unfortunately, Posty and Spooky cannot do anything since their batteries have run out. Can the Rescue Team help them and put out the fire?
6	6	"Fuss About Ghosts"	Lee Dong-woo	Eom Jun-yeong	Kim Seon-goo	March 15, 2011
Rumor of a ghost in Brooms Town's forest goes around. The kid cars, Rody, Benny and Mini go to the forest to prove that they are not cowards themselves. However, Rody gets an accident, getting stuck inside a tree in the dark forest, and Beny needs to get help from the Rescue Team. Can the Rescue Team save Rody?
7	7	"Try Not to Hurry"	Lee Dong-woo	Eom Jun-yeong	Kim Seon-goo	March 21, 2011
In the sequel to School B's Present, School B has the same problems from the second episode, will the Rescue Team save him?
8	8	"I Want to Be Praised"	Lee Dong-woo	Eom Jun-yeong	Kim Seon-goo	March 22, 2011
Bruner feels envious that Poke gets praised for finding the legendary car Thunder's old tire at Mr. Musty's house. Bruner digs up the ground in Mr. Musty's front yard hoping he finds something great. However Bruner digs the hole so deep that he cannot get out again. Can Bruner be saved from the hole by the Rescue Team?
9	9	"Trust Your Friends"	Lee Dong-woo	Eom Jun-yeong	Kim Seon-goo	March 28, 2011
On a stormy day with a lot of lightning, one of the tires in Mr. Wheeler's store is stolen. As Poli investigates, everyone is losing trust in each other. Is it really true that Brooms Town has a thief?
10	10	"Helly's Birthday"	Lee Dong-woo	Eom Jun-yeong	Kim Seon-goo	March 29, 2011
Helly is disappointed that no one remembers his birthday. Later, Poli and his friends feel sorry that they did not remember his birthday and they prepare a surprise party for him.
11	11	"Where Are You Going, Cleany?"	Lee Dong-woo	Eom Jung-yeong	Kim Seon-goo	April 4, 2011
Cleany accidentally charges himself from an electronic recharge station which is out of order. Cleany plots to switch tools repeatedly to save his pain. Cleany goes at top speed uncontrollably. Can the Rescue Team stop Cleany?
12	12	"Micky is Angry"	Lee Dong-woo	Eom Jung-yeong	Kim Seon-goo	April 5, 2011
Micky is upset at his friends because they do not care about his wet concrete. Micky stays awake at the site all night to keep the fresh concrete safe so no one drives on it until it dries. But he cannot help dozing while he is pouring the concrete and it overflows. When he wakes up, he realizes that he is stuck in the spilled concrete. Will he get help from the Rescue Team?
13	13	"I Love You, Grandpa!"	Lee Dong-woo	Eom Jung-yeong	Kim Seon-goo	April 11, 2011
Mini wants to have a nice tire like her friends. However, Grandpa Musty gives Mini an old fashioned tire saying it is strong, firm and fits her. Musty realizes that Mini does not like it and he buys the Princess tire Mini wanted to cheer her up. On the way home from the shop, the wind blows the ribbon off the tire and Musty gets stuck on a broken bridge and drops the tire into the stream. Will Mini call the Rescue Team to help save her grandpa?
14	14	"It's Okay to Make a Mistake"	Lee Dong-woo	Eom Jung-yeong	Kim Seon-goo	April 12, 2011
Posty spreads the story of Spooky's mistake all over Brooms Town. Posty says to Spooky that he never makes mistakes. Yet, Posty drops one of his packages by rolling over a pebble while delivering and goes down the stairs to pick it up. Posty slides into the guard rail along the cliff and gets stuck in it. Spooky tries help Posty, but he also ends up being stuck into the guard rail next to him. After they shake it by moving, the guard rail loses bolts and the side rotates. Will they get help from the Rescue Team?
15	15	"Talent Contest"	Lee Dong-woo	Eom Jung-yeong	Kim Seon-goo	June 6, 2011
Brooms Town is holding a talent competition. Dump is anxious about missing Bruner's super ball performance. While he is climbing up the hill with a lot of loads of logs, he gets a flat tire and the logs slide off and block the road. He gets another flat tire after rolling over a stone and more logs block the road. Can the Rescue Team save Dump?
16	16	"Keep Your Promise"	Lee Dong-woo	Eom Jung-yeong	Kim Seon-goo	June 7, 2011
When School B is about to take the children to school, Amy introduces her doll to him. On the way home, Amy realizes that she has lost her doll and won't stop crying. School B promises Amy that he can go to find her doll. Can School B and the Rescue Team find the doll for Amy before her bedtime?
17	17	"Please, Cleany!"	Lee Dong-woo	Eom Jung-yeong	Kim Seon-goo	June 13, 2011
While Cleany and Posty go to meet an old friend at the docks, Cleany accidentally goes onto an open drawbridge when he and Posty were warned not to. Will Poli and Roy rescue him?
18	18	"Let's Be Clean!"	Lee Dong-woo	Eom Jung-yeong	Kim Seon-goo	June 14, 2011
Spooky is trying to set a record for how many days he does not wash himself. When Spooky, covered with mud, passes by the construction site, Mr. Builder's blueprints blow onto him and cover his sight. Spooky is so frightened that he ends up crashing into the building under construction. Mr. Builder cannot recognize Spooky and he thinks that there is a monster in the building. What's worse, the supports have been damaged and the building is about to collapse! Will Spooky get help from the Rescue Team?
19	19	"The Friendship Tree"	Lee Dong-woo	Eom Jung-yeong	Kim Seon-goo	June 20, 2011
Best friends Cap and Posty name two trees 'The Friendship Tree' because the flower which blooms on both trees connects them. Cap and Posty have a big argument and the Rescue Team tries to take them to the Friendship Tree to reconcile them. However, Cap and Posty have another argument on who gets to pass through the Friendship Tree first and end up being stuck together between the tree. Will the Rescue Team help get them unstuck and help them be friends again?
20	20	"Remember, Max!"	Lee Dong-woo	Eom Jung-yeong	Kim Seon-goo	June 21, 2011
Friends in Brooms Town get ready to participate in the track competition. Max, being so heavy, finds out that he is not able to participate in any event, so he gets discouraged and runs away. When the Rescue Team find Max, they encourage Max to participate in the event as a track competition worker.
21	21	"Hide and Seek"	Lee Dong-woo	Eom Jung-yeong	Kim Seon-goo	June 27, 2011
A little girl named Mary plays hide and seek in the construction site with Cleany. Mary falls asleep while she is hiding inside of a pipe. Terry, who does not know about Mary, carries the pipe to the port. When Cleany sees Mary, who is still sleeping in the pipe line, he calls for the Rescue Team. Will they save Mary?
22	22	"Benny's Dream"	Lee Dong-woo	Eom Jung-yeong	Kim Seon-goon	June 28, 2011
Benny wants to be like Roy and even has a dream about being a fire engine. Benny puts a small crane on his back and takes Rody to the electronic recharge station successfully. Benny is confident he can be a fire engine and he tries to help Dump, who gets stuck on the drawbridge and cannot move. However, Dump is too heavy to carry. At this moment, the drawbridge is opening up. Can the Rescue Team save Dump and Benny before they fall into the river?
23	23	"Escape from the Energy Crisis"	Lee Dong-woo	Eom Jung-yeong	Kim Seon-goon	July 4, 2011
The energy in Brooms Town runs out. Although Jin says everyone should conserve energy until the wind energy is recharged, nobody cares. Before long, all the light in Brooms Town is out and all the cars stop as they use up the energy. Can the Rescue Team save Brooms Town from this energy crisis?
24	24	"Whose Side Should I Be On?"	Lee Dong-woo	Eom Jung-yeong	Kim Seon-goon	July 5, 2011
Posty and Cap had a fight while playing ball together. Cap hits the net, so they ask Cleany to join the ball game, and then to choose which side he wants to be on. Posty and Cap each secretly give a present to Cleany, who is hesitant to choose the team. Cleany backs into the net, yanking on it to stay away from them, but hits a pebble and flies into the billboard. Who will Cleany choose?
25	25	"Be Healthy"	Lee Dong-woo	Eom Jung-yeong	Kim Seon-goon	July 11, 2011
In the sequel to Please, Cleany! Helly has a broken propeller, will the team fix it?
26	26	"Our New Friend, Whooper"	Lee Dong-woo	Eom Jung-yeong	Kim Seon-goon	July 12, 2011
Whooper the double-decker bus is a newcomer to Brooms Town. But, when Whooper drives freely around town ignoring the warning for the upcoming storm, he slides off the road after hitting a fallen rock and he is about to fall down the cliff! So Cap gets scrapes and cuts by the fallen rocks. Can he be saved by the Rescue Team?

=== Season 2 (2011–12) ===
Season 2 began on December 26, 2011 (with "Rody is a Liar"), and ended on May 15, 2012 (with "Harmony of Brooms Town (part 2)"). It contains 26 episodes.

No. overall	No. in season	Title	Directed by	Written by	Storyboard by	Original release date
27	1	"Rody is a Liar"	Unknown	Unknown	TBA	December 26, 2011
Rody, a boy who starts lying about emergencies to have fun with the Rescue Team, as well as everyone else in Brooms Town. Later on, Whooper gets a disastrous accident because of Rody's lies and Mini refuses to get help because she doesn't believe Rody! But Mr. Musty isn't so sure it's a lie... Will the Rescue Team help Whooper?
28	2	"Greedy Mr. Wheeler"	Unknown	Unknown	TBA	December 27, 2011
Mr. Wheeler starts to be very greedy. He doesn't want to do anything for Spooky and Cleany and angrily yells at the Construction Team for being noisy. They complain about Mr. Wheeler to Spooky and Cleany but he overhears this and yells at them again! But the next day, a tile falls off the roof of Mr. Wheeler's store and his ladder is broken. Mr. Wheeler doesn't want to ask for a ladder from anyone in Brooms Town because he's afraid they'll refuse because of how he treated them. So he tries to fix the roofing tile alone by climbing up the chimney to get to the roof, and he accidentally falls back into the chimney and gets stuck. Will the Rescue Team save him?
29	3	"I Like the Circus"	Unknown	Unknown	TBA	January 2, 2012
When a circus is held at the city hall, Spooky, Cap, and Posty want to recreate it by doing a new circus built by themselves. Helly doesn't like the idea, but Spooky reassures him he won't do anything dangerous. However, Spooky breaks his promise and does an extreme stunt at the construction site, where he accidentally gets stuck on top of a building. Will the Rescue Team save Spooky from circus danger?
30	4	"Swampy Situation"	Unknown	Unknown	TBA	January 3, 2012
The Construction Team are all having fun playing ball - all except for Bruner, as he wants to keep the ball for himself. Then, when the other members decided to leave, they tell Bruner to go out and play in the woods. However, Bruner gets suspicious and is sure that his construction team members are up to something. However, the Construction Team members (except for Bruner) all fall into the swamp and Poke's tracks slide by saving Dump. Bruner needs to get the Rescue Team to save them.
31	5	"Mini's Present"	Unknown	Unknown	TBA	January 9, 2012
It's Mini's birthday! She and her best friend, Rody, are having fun driving with their new tires. Mini then sees that something is wrong with her tires, so she asks her grandpa, Mr. Musty, to get her some new shiny tires for her birthday. But then everything goes awry when Mini later ends up getting stuck in between two boulders thanks to a certain lumber truck during her birthday party! Will the Rescue Team bail her out?
32	6	"Leky, Lefy, Lety"	Unknown	Unknown	TBA	January 10, 2012
The Crane Triplets are upset that others are getting their names mixed up all the time. So Helly decides to make a song that describes the Crane Triplets' names and their personalities, which will help others to remember their names better. But later on, the Crane Triplets get into a huge argument, and Helly and the Rescue Team must sing the song to stop them from arguing.
33	7	"Let's Play Together, Poke!"	Unknown	Unknown	TBA	January 16, 2012
Poke is unable to play the World Puzzle with his friends, and then later runs far away from them. The Construction Crew find out that their trusted and beloved friend, Poke, is missing. They call the Rescue Team for help.
34	8	"Thank You, Cleany"	Unknown	Unknown	TBA	January 17, 2012
While Cleany is cleaning the construction site, he tries to get help from Titan. But this fails when Titan scolds Cleany for taking too long to figure out what he needs. Humiliated, Cleany tries to clean Titan's wheels to pay his debt back. However, Titan rejects this offer, leaving Cleany behind and going on his way. When Cleany finds out that Titan is missing a bolt from his wheel, he realizes that Titan will get in a car accident and calls the Rescue Team in an effort to prevent this from happening and as payback on Titan.
35	9	"Spooky and a Swarm of Bees"	Unknown	Unknown	TBA	January 23, 2012
Spooky is on his way to a picnic. But then a bee interrupts him and he then starts to follow it. But when the bee goes into the hive, Spooky, wanting to play with the bee, starts digging into the hive and ends up getting covered in honey. Spooky tries to run away when the swarm of bees starts to chase after him. Will the Rescue Team save him from the bees or will he get stung?
36	10	"I Like Myself"	Unknown	Unknown	TBA	January 24, 2012
This episode is the same thing to the previous Season 1 episode, Remember, Max!.
37	11	"Annie's Trip"	Unknown	Unknown	TBA	January 30, 2012
Annie, one of School B's regular passengers, is sad that unlike her other friends, her parents are too busy to take her on a trip. When School B hears her story, he decides to take Annie out on a short trip after school. Being overexcited, Annie sees a flower which her mom loves on a cliff, and tries to get it, but ends up sliding off the cliff. Will School B and the Rescue Team help Annie get back to the top and get her home to her parents?
38	12	"Treasure Hunt"	Unknown	Unknown	TBA	January 31, 2012
Cleany and Posty start to dig for some buried treasure. But then Cleany zooms off and falls off a cliff. Posty gets the Rescue Team right away. Will they rescue Cleany and help him and Posty find the treasure?
39	13	"A Friend Under the Sea"	Unknown	Unknown	TBA	February 6, 2012
Marine introduces Roy to his pet dolphin, Ming Ming, at the harbor. Later on, Marine accidentally gets Ming Ming sick. Will the Rescue Team make Ming Ming feel better?
40	14	"Thinking of Granddaughter"	Unknown	Unknown	TBA	February 7, 2012
Mr. Wheeler gets a parcel from his granddaughter, Betty, who's living overseas. The parcel turns out to be a computer, which can be used to make video calls. Jin tries to teach Mr. Wheeler how to use the computer, including using a voltage converter as the computer is made in another country, but Mr. Wheeler is too excited to talk to his granddaughter and doesn't really pay attention. Later that night, Mr. Wheeler turns on the computer to talk to Betty without using the voltage converter or thinking about Jin's instructions and accidentally starts a fire in his store. Will the Rescue Team put the fire out in time?
41	15	"Trash Commotion"	Unknown	Unknown	TBA	February 13, 2012
Cleany is collecting all the trash in Brooms Town. But later on, he ended up getting stuck after driving in glue. Will the Rescue Team help him get out of a sticky situation to continue his quest collecting trash?
42	16	"Bruner's New Ball"	Unknown	Unknown	TBA	February 14, 2012
Bruner shows off his new ball to his friends, which flashes light and makes sound. However, Bruner doesn't want his friends to touch the ball and he hides it to keep it away from them. Later that day, his friends take out the ball without telling Bruner. While they are playing, they drop the ball in the stream. Poke tries to get the ball out of the stream and falls in, and the Rescue Team is called upon this emergency.
43	17	"I Want It"	Unknown	Unknown	TBA	April 16, 2012
Mini finds the snow globe which Mr. Wheeler has lost. However, when Mr. Wheeler comes back to look for it, Mini lies to him, saying she hasn't seen it. Wanting to find the snow globe as it was a gift from his granddaughter, Mr. Wheeler goes around looking for it and falls into the pit in the construction site, breaking his leg. Mini regrets lying to Mr. Wheeler and looks for him to return the snow globe, only to find him trapped in the pit and calls for the Rescue Team to help get him out.
44	18	"Where Are You, Jin?"	Unknown	Unknown	TBA	April 17, 2012
Jin and the children go on a field trip to the woods and get caught in the rainstorm. They quickly hide in a cave, but the stream is flooded and now they are trapped. On top of everything else, the walkie-talkie gets broken and they have no way to contact the Rescue Team! Will the Rescue Team find them?
45	19	"The Secret of Poke"	Unknown	Unknown	TBA	April 23, 2012
At the construction site, Poke finds a dandelion while digging in the ground. He decides to keep the dandelion alive and plants it in the remote area without telling anyone. Later, Poke finds out that the dandelion is in danger again because of the new road being constructed in the area. Wanting to save the flower, Poke runs to dig it up and gets into an accident after being scared by a dump truck. Can he and the flower be saved by the Rescue Team?
46	20	"Weird School B"	Unknown	Unknown	TBA	April 24, 2012
School B gets white paint spots while driving underneath a building being painted, despite the fact Mr. Builder asks Bruner to push his ladder an inch. Embarrassed by his look, School B decides to paint his whole body with white paint. When School B goes to pick up the children, everyone is scared of him because he looks like a ghost! School B tries to wash off the paint, but it doesn't come off. Will the Rescue Team figure something out to clean up School B?
47	21	"Brave Mr. Musty"	Unknown	Unknown	TBA	April 30, 2012
The Rescue Team have Mr. Musty warn Mini, Rody, and Benny about a strange truck known as Truck X, and to beware of him because he has just tried to kidnap someone in the next town. Truck X, knowing about Mr. Musty's warning, captures Mini and her friends by luring them with toys and puts them in his storage compartment. Mr. Musty tries to save the children, but he accidentally lets Truck X get away with them. He calls the Rescue Team to help him find Truck X to arrest him and save the children.
48	22	"Please Hear Me Out"	Unknown	Unknown	TBA	May 1, 2012
Micky finds out that the two boys, Rody and Benny making tire marks on his newly poured concrete. Micky gets angry and yells at the children, scaring them. Mr. Builder happens to pass by the scene and takes sides with the boys and without listening to both sides. Micky then gets angry at Mr. Builder for not listening to him and hides in a tunnel, using his cement to seal up the entrance. Mr. Builder soon finds out what really happened from the boys and feels awful for not listening to Micky. Micky decides to apologize to Mr. Builder to make things all right again, but his cement is now hard and he's trapped in the tunnel! Will the Rescue Team save Micky and help him make up with Mr. Builder?
49	23	"Cap is Neat"	Unknown	Unknown	TBA	May 7, 2012
Cap is having fun playing ball with his best friends, Posty and Spooky. However, he ends up getting covered in mud and has to go to the car wash to clean himself up. He ends up getting covered in mud twice more and keeps having to go back to the car wash. To make matters worse, when he goes for a fourth time, he accidentally gets stuck in the car wash when his frequent washing causes it to break. Posty and Spooky must get the Rescue Team to help him get free and fix the car wash.
50	24	"Mystery Mail"	Unknown	Unknown	TBA	May 8, 2012
Posty finds tons of letters that says "to thankful lady" in the mail box while going to the mail factory. Posty gets frustrated because he can't deliver the letters without the address. Attempting to find the sender of the letters, Posty stakes out near the mail box. But he accidentally causes Dump to have an accident. Will the Rescue Team save Dump and help Posty find who's sending the letters?
51	25	"Harmony of Brooms Town: Part 1"	Unknown	Unknown	TBA	May 14, 2012
Jin announces that there will be an audition for choir members, and the cars who pass will participate in the big choir contest held in the big city! Many friends in Brooms Town come to the audition. However, Cleany does not show up even after he applies because he is afraid that people will make fun of him for not singing well. The members of the Rescue Team decide to hold a special audition for Cleany.
52	26	"Harmony of Brooms Town: Part 2"	Unknown	Unknown	TBA	May 15, 2012
When Amber continues the audition of the big city, who will be awarded for the best audition ever held?

=== Season 3 (2014) ===
Season 3 began on February 26 (with "Brooms Town's Visitor"), and ended on May 22, 2014 (with "Amber's Training"). It contains 26 episodes.

No. overall	No. in season	Title	Directed by	Written by	Storyboard by	Original release date
53	1	"Brooms Town's Visitor"	Unknown	Unknown	TBA	February 26, 2014
Camp, a journalist, travels to Brooms Town. However, he acts rudely towards the locals and it's up to the Rescue Team to figure out why.
54	2	"Save Helly"	Unknown	Unknown	TBA	February 27, 2014
Jin tells Helly to stay on the ground to keep safe in the face of a hurricane heading towards Brooms Town. Helly's disobedience may get him into deep trouble.
55	3	"Don't Worry, School B"	Unknown	Unknown	TBA	March 5, 2014
School B has nightmares that keep him up at night. Because he is so tired, he runs into trouble during the day because he starts sleep-racing. Will he get rescued by the Rescue Team?
56	4	"Bruner's Little Cousin"	Unknown	Unknown	TBA	March 6, 2014
Bruner's trick on his younger cousin, Bruny goes awry. So the Rescue Team must come to the rescue.
57	5	"A Gift for Cleany"	Unknown	Unknown	TBA	March 12, 2014
With Cleany's birthday fast approaching, the Rescue Team tries to find the ideal gift for him.
58	6	"Our Secret Clubhouse"	Unknown	Unknown	TBA	March 13, 2014
Best friends Mini, Beny, and Rody make an abandoned house their new clubhouse. The old home may be too dangerous to play in, though. So the Rescue Team must step in to keep Mini and her friends away from it.
59	7	"Terry's New Friend"	Unknown	Unknown	TBA	March 19, 2014
Terry loses his patience with his new friend, Lifty, because he is so clumsy. Lifty tries to work extra hard to prove himself to Terry that he is not clumsy. But this has dangerous results that lead them both to need to be rescued by the Rescue Team.
60	8	"Helly's Pinwheel"	Unknown	Unknown	TBA	March 20, 2014
The toy store has a big giveaway, but some mistakes lead to arguments among the residents of Brooms Town. The Rescue Team steps in to help them stop arguing.
61	9	"Mickey's Lonely"	Unknown	Unknown	TBA	March 26, 2014
Bruner gets trapped in a cement machine while trying to find his ball in Micky's yard. It's up to the Rescue Team to save their friend from danger.
62	10	"Drawing Lines"	Unknown	Unknown	TBA	March 27, 2014
When their toys are found in disarray, best friends, Mini, Benny and Rody have a disagreement and the Rescue Team must figure out why.
63	11	"Let's Draw"	Unknown	Unknown	TBA	April 2, 2014
Poke begins drawing pictures around the town, much to the dismay of some of Brooms Town's residents. It's up to the Rescue Team to prevent him from doing it.
64	12	"I Need a Friend"	Unknown	Unknown	TBA	April 3, 2014
Lifty feels like he is unable to make friends. However, he proves his place in Brooms Town helping the Rescue Team after an accident.
65	13	"Please Stop My Hiccups"	Unknown	Unknown	TBA	April 9, 2014
The Rescue Team tries to help Cleany with his hiccups.
66	14	"Poli's Secret"	Unknown	Unknown	TBA	April 10, 2014
Camp returns to Brooms Town. While everyone else is keen to see his caterpillar collection, Poli's secret makes him act sour and the Rescue Team must cool him down.
67	15	"The Invitation"	Unknown	Unknown	TBA	April 16, 2014
After being called Brooms Town's most fashionable resident, Cap wants to celebrate his status. When Spooky doesn't receive an invitation, he becomes sad. So the Rescue Team and Cap send him an invitation.
68	16	"Spooky Plays Sick"	Unknown	Unknown	TBA	April 17, 2014
All the residents of Brooms Town check on Cleany when he gets sick. This makes Spooky jealous so he decides to trick everyone. Will the Rescue Team prove him wrong?
69	17	"Multiple Mix-up"	Unknown	Unknown	TBA	April 23, 2014
Grandpa Musty sends Mini a present, but then she gets mad at him after a misunderstanding. It's up to The Rescue Team to step in and fix Mr. Musty's mistake.
70	18	"Let's Be Honest"	Unknown	Unknown	TBA	April 24, 2014
When Helly makes a mistake that breaks an invention, he lies to Jin. Helly later finds himself in trouble when there's a fire at Spooky's. So he and the Rescue Team must stop this dangerous situation from happening.
71	19	"Max Gets a Fish"	Unknown	Unknown	TBA	April 30, 2014
After promising to take good care of it, Max convinces Mr. Builder to buy him a pet fish. Max quickly forgets this after Camp takes him on a trip. So this means that the Rescue Team should get him a fish instead.
72	20	"Let's Follow the Rules"	Unknown	Unknown	TBA	May 1, 2014
The citizens of Brooms Town prove that following directions is hard when they keep using an emergency-only charging station but one day, Cap, Posty and Lifty are fighting over the charging station who use it first and broke it which cause the fire to break out. So the Rescue Team must help them learn why they can't use it all the time.
73	21	"You Can Do It, Mr. Builder"	Unknown	Unknown	TBA	May 7, 2014
Mr. Builder gets sick after he worries too much about a new project. The Construction Team and the Rescue Team decide to amp up the work in order to both get the job done and help The Construction Team's boss.
74	22	"Cleany Gets Angry"	Unknown	Unknown	TBA	May 8, 2014
Spooky discovers that Cleany is very easygoing and vows to see him get mad. Spooky sets up a series of tricks that may change Cleany's good mood. So the Rescue Team must put a stop to this.
75	23	"The Hottest Day in Brooms Town"	Unknown	Unknown	TBA	May 14, 2014
The Rescue Team instructs the residents of Brooms Town to stay indoors during a heat wave, but not everybody listens and they have to figure out why.
76	24	"Ms. Bell's Medal"	Unknown	Unknown	TBA	May 15, 2014
Lifty accidentally loses one of Ms. Bell's prized possessions while helping her move. He goes on a hunt to find it to prove he did not steal it. And the Rescue Team must both help Lifty and show Ms. Bell it is wrong to jump to conclusions.
77	25	"Who is Taller?"	Unknown	Unknown	TBA	May 21, 2014
The residents of Brooms Town get into an argument over who is the tallest. So it's up to the Rescue Team to ease the tension.
78	26	"Amber's Training"	Unknown	Unknown	TBA	May 22, 2014
Amber tries to climb a cliff. Meanwhile, the residents of Brooms Town grow concerned in the wake of a new tree disease. So the Rescue Team must solve it out during Amber's training.

=== Season 4 (2015) ===
Season 4 began on August 31 (with "A Suspicious Friend"), and ended on November 24, 2015 (with "Our Fabulous New Friend"). It contains 26 episodes.

No. overall	No. in season	Title	Directed by	Written by	Storyboard by	Original release date
79	1	"A Suspicious Friend"	Unknown	Unknown	TBA	August 31, 2015
The residents of Brooms Town grow worried when they hear of a monster lurking in the woods. They decide to find out the truth along with the Rescue Team and learn something valuable in the process.
80	2	"It's Good to Tidy Up"	Unknown	Unknown	TBA	September 1, 2015
Spooky tries to find someone to play with him on his day off. But nobody wants to come over to his messy house. So the Rescue Team must help Spooky find a good friend for him to play with.
81	3	"I'm Going to Do Whatever I Want"	Unknown	Unknown	TBA	September 7, 2015
Bruny forgoes safety and tries doing thing his way, which lands him in a sticky situation. Will the Rescue Team pull him out?
82	4	"Helly's Wish"	Unknown	Unknown	TBA	September 8, 2015
Helly gives up his propeller so he can have wheels since he is jealous of his friends. However, he learns why he is important after he and his friends, Poli, Roy and Amber need help saving Camp.
83	5	"We Look Alike"	Unknown	Unknown	TBA	September 14, 2015
Mr. Builder and Mr. Wheeler find out that they look like twins when Mr. Builder borrows Mr. Wheeler's clothes.
84	6	"Marine's Dream"	Unknown	Unknown	TBA	September 15, 2015
Lifty and Terry work on a surprise for Marine when they learn that he has never gone camping.
85	7	"The Unpoppable Bubble"	Unknown	Unknown	TBA	September 21, 2015
Micky finds himself adrift after messing with Jin's bubble invention. The Rescue Team must save the day.
86	8	"A Spring Cleaning Disaster"	Unknown	Unknown	TBA	September 22, 2015
Posty mistakenly throws out his collection of stamps in his attempt to clean up Brooms Town.
87	9	"Where's Bruny?"	Unknown	Unknown	TBA	September 28, 2015
Bruner enlists Max's help to watch Bruny. However, Bruny turns up missing after Max's attention wanders. It's up to the Rescue Team to find Bruny and bring him back.
88	10	"The Fortune Cookie"	Unknown	Unknown	TBA	September 29, 2015
Spooky and Lifty decide to go on an adventure after reading a fortune cookie message. However, they soon find themselves in trouble. So the Rescue Team has to save them.
89	11	"Tracky's Special Invitation"	Unknown	Unknown	TBA	October 5, 2015
Tracky decides to give his farm a makeover when School B looks for a new place to take the kids on their field trip.
90	12	"I Want to Go to Sea"	Unknown	Unknown	TBA	October 6, 2015
Rody stows away with Marine after wanting to see the ocean. The Rescue Team must come to the rescue after the poor weather sends Rody overboard.
91	13	"Move Out! Battle in the Woods: Part 1"	Unknown	Unknown	TBA	October 12, 2015
The Rescue Team embarks on a big mission after Helly runs into trouble at the Wildlife Reserve, they find that "somecar" is hunting animals in the wildlife reserve.
92	14	"Move Out! Battle in the Woods: Part 2"	Unknown	Unknown	TBA	October 13, 2015
The Rescue Team enlists the help of their new friends - the Mountain Rescue Team members, Mark and Bucky, to capture the Poacher before he escapes once more. As they chase him, Poli gets a little trouble, Roy and Amber also, such as Poacher making Poli fall of a cliff, Mark and Bucky are here to help and save them.
93	15	"Please Accept My Apology"	Unknown	Unknown	TBA	October 19, 2015
Max decides to take care of an errand during a game of hide-and-seek with his friend, Lifty, which makes Lifty angry. Max realizes what he did wrong and must say that he is sorry to Lifty with the Rescue Team there to help him.
94	16	"Bruner's Birthday Secret"	Unknown	Unknown	TBA	October 20, 2015
Bruner's birthday approaches and he wants a special present. He tries to find out what his friends got him after they refuse to tell him.
95	17	"Miracle at Tracky's Farm"	Unknown	Unknown	TBA	October 26, 2015
Jin instructs the residents of Brooms Town to reduce their water usage during a drought. The Rescue Team must find a way to help Tracky, whose farm is in trouble.
96	18	"Boom! Crash! Danger!"	Unknown	Unknown	TBA	October 27, 2015
Best friends Mini, Benny, and Rody travel to Galaxy Hill to watch a lightning storm. The Rescue Team must come to the rescue when the trouble hits, using Jin's unpredictable invention, Poli attracts thunder until the car kids are safe.
97	19	"Camp's Secret Plan"	Unknown	Unknown	TBA	November 2, 2015
Camp secretly decides to visit Brooms Town earlier than expected. When he doesn't show up on time, everyone grows concerned. So the Rescue Team must find him in private.
98	20	"Fishing Commotion"	Unknown	Unknown	TBA	November 3, 2015
Leky tries to catch a fish for Ms. Belle, but stays up too late in the process which makes him too tired to work. So will the Rescue Team help him get energized and catch a fish for Ms. Belle on time?
99	21	"Thank You, Roy"	Unknown	Unknown	TBA	November 9, 2015
Roy worsens his injury when he tries too hard during a busy day at work and learns the value of taking a break every once in a while.
100	22	"Disappearance of Spooky"	Unknown	Unknown	TBA	November 10, 2015
Spooky sneaks into Jin's lab and plays with her new invisible laser machine. When he runs into trouble, nobody can even see him to help. So the Rescue Team must make Spooky visible again to save him from this incident.
101	23	"Helping Each Other When Things Are Difficult"	Unknown	Unknown	TBA	November 16, 2015
An accident unfolds when Dump and Bruner get into an argument at the harbor. Will the Rescue Team help them get along?
102	24	"Tracky's Present"	Unknown	Unknown	TBA	November 17, 2015
Tracky gives some raspberries to Mr. Wheeler to thank him for his kindness. Later, everyone hears about a snake in Brooms Town. So The Rescue Team and Tracky must stop the snake from scaring the whole town.
103	25	"The Brooms Town Railroad Station"	Unknown	Unknown	TBA	November 23, 2015
Lifty, Bruner and Dump become trapped near Frog Bridge and need the Rescue Team's help to get them out.
104	26	"Our Fabulous New Friend"	Unknown	Unknown	TBA	November 24, 2015
Mr. Builder throws a party complete with a surprise to celebrate the new railway station.
