= Robocar Poli =

South Korean children's TV series made by Hyundai

- Also known as: PiyoPiyo Friends; Robo Poli
- Genre: Children's animation; Comedy; Adventure; Educational; Preschool
- Created by: Lee Dong-woo (RoiVisual)
- Voices of: Marc Thompson, Rebecca Soler, and more
- Theme music composer: Shin Seung-jun
- Countries of origin: South Korea
- Original language: Korean
- No. of seasons: 5
- No. of episodes: 120 (list of episodes)

Production
- Executive producer: Eom Jun-yeong
- Producers: Kim Seon-goo; Bak Jeong-min; Nam Han-gil; Kim Rae-gyeong; Park Jung-min
- Running time: 11 minutes
- Production companies: RoiVisual; Educational Broadcasting System; Hyundai Motors; Benex Investment; Korea Creative Content Agency

Original release
- Network: EBS
- Release: February 28, 2011 – December 13, 2022

Related
- Traffic Safety with Poli; Fire Safety with Roy; Daily Life Safety with Amber; Song-Song Museum (spin-offs)

Robocar Poli (Korean: 로보카 폴리) is a South Korean 3D animated children's television series created by RoiVisual. The series released its first episode on Educational Broadcasting System (EBS) in 2011, and aired for five seasons. Robocar Poli consists of 120 eleven-minute episodes.

== Synopsis ==
In Brooms Town, a small city with a capable rescue team, there are always accidents such as a car sliding off a cliff in the rain, a car crash, or a child locked in a firehouse. In every episode, the town's rescue team saves characters from trouble. At the end of each episode, the rescue team strongly advises the characters who are in danger, as well as the audience.

== Characters ==
=== Main ===
- Poli (폴리; Polli) (voiced by Marc Thompson) is a blue and white police car. Poli boasts the fastest top speed. He leads the rescue team and protects the village from various dangers, taking responsibility for traffic safety. Poli often gives simple advice on basic traffic safety tips to those willing to listen, and he often makes the plans on a mission.
- Amber (엠버; Embeo) (voiced by Rebecca Soler) is a pink and white ambulance van. Wise and clever, Amber provides clues to solutions in situations using her ample knowledge and quick judgment when the rescue team is in trouble. She protects the lives of friends with various medical tools and takes responsibility for safety accidents in daily life. Amber is knowledgeable in caring for plants and animals as well as people and vehicles, but she also has comparable computer skills. Amber was given a slight cosmetic change in Season 3, replacing the red cross on her lightbar with a red letter A.
- Roy (로이; Roi) (voiced by Jason Griffith) is a red and yellow fire truck. Roy is very big and strong. He calmly and reliably solves problems in any rescue situation and is responsible for fire and electrical safety problems in the village. Roy uses a series of alternate attachments that include a crane arm, a portable hoist usable in robot mode, and a cherry picker in addition to his usual ladder. He also pulls much of the trailers the team uses on their missions. Additionally, he is physically the most powerful member of the team and carries a fire hose that sprays anything that can flow in a stream-like form.
- Helly (헬리; Helli) (voiced by Kate Bristol) is a green and white helicopter flying through the sky. Armed with a positive and quick witted personality, he livens up the entire rescue team. He is supposedly the youngest member of the Brooms Town Rescue Team. His high performance search and information transmission abilities make him the messenger of choice of the rescue team. During missions, he is often sent by Poli to go ahead of the team to scout the present situation and calm whoever is in trouble until the rescue team arrives. Helly uses his robot form more often than the others, as he has very few alternative ways to move on the ground. He also uses many special tools and equipment in his work. Parts of his legs were recolored in Season 3, as they are notably more grey in color.
- Jin (진; Jin) is the leader of the rescue squad and she wears orange and white clothes. Unlike the other members of the team, she is a human being rather than a machine. She is an inventor, having made several gadgets that have helped the team, though not all of them have been considered successes.

=== Mountain Rescue Team ===
The Mountain Rescue Team are a trio of three members who come from the neighboring town of Treasureville. They were introduced in Season 4.

- Carry (캐리; Kaeri) is a dark blue aircraft that resembles Bell Boeing V-22 Osprey. He is the strongest member of the Mountain Rescue Team, and often helps the Broomstown Rescue Team when in need.
- Mark (마크; Makeu) is an orange pickup truck resembling a Colorado. Mark is the leader of the Mountain Rescue Team because of his brave personality. He always supports The Rescue Team during missions along with his best friend Bucky. He was introduced in Season 4.
- Bucky (버키; Beoki) is a yellow dune buggy car who is a member of the Mountain Rescue Team. He is best friends with Mark and The Rescue Team and Jin. He also helps The Rescue Team. He was introduced in Season 4.

=== Desert Rescue Team ===
The Desert Rescue Team are a trio of three members who can all transform into robots and live in the neighboring town of Sandville. They were introduced in Season 5.

- Keaton (키튼; Kiteun) (voiced by James Weaver Clark) is a member of the Desert Rescue Team. Medical, telecommunication and fueling in the desert that can also be transformed into a mobile base.
- Droney (드로니; Deuroni) is a drone who belongs to the Desert Rescue Team. Responsible for desert surveillance and radar detection.
- Sandy (샌디; Saendi) is the leader of the Desert Rescue Team. Responsible for desert security strategy and command! She's very athletic and often rides the desert on her sandboard.

=== Spin-off characters ===
- Kevin (케빈; Kebin) (voiced by Grey Griffin) is a boy with blonde hair. He only appeared in Traffic Safety with Poli.
- Susie (수지; Suji) (voiced by Cristina Vee) is Kevin's adoptive younger sister.
- Sally (샐리; Saelli) (voiced by Lisa Ortiz) is Kevin and Susie's mother.
- Bob (밥; Bap) (voiced by Eric Stuart) is Kevin and Susie's father.
- Elizabeth (엘리자베스; Ellijabeseu) is Kevin's cat (accidentally called Mittens by Sally).
- Doug (더그; Deogeu) (voiced by Collin Dean) is a boy with brown hair and freckles. He is also best friends with Kevin.
- Jenny (제니; Jeni) (voiced by Michele Knotz) is a girl with red hair. She is also Kevin and Doug's classmate.
- Cindy the pizza delivery girl (신디; Sindi) (voiced by Rachael Lillis) delivers pizzas to everybody.
- Peter (피터; Piteo) (voiced by Veronica Taylor) is a boy with blonde hair. He only appeared in Fire Safety with Roy and Daily Life Safety with Amber.
- Lucy (루시; Rusi) (voiced by Liliana Mumy) is Peter's younger sister.
- Robert (로버트; Robeoteu) (voiced by Bill Rogers) is Peter and Lucy's father.
- Sarah (사라; Sara) (voiced by Amy Birnbaum) is Peter and Lucy's mother.
- Buddy (버디; Beodi) is Peter's dog.
- Johnny (조니; Joni) (voiced by Tara Strong) is a boy with brown hair. He is also best friends with Peter.
- Ralph (랄프; Ralpeu) (voiced by Jason Griffith) is Johnny's Father. He has a moustache.
- Cindy (신디; Sindi) (voiced by Emily Bauer) is a girl with orange hair. Cindy is good at studying and sports. She is prim and very decisive. She is also Peter, Johnny, and Charles' classmate.
- Monica (모니카; Monika) (voiced by Eileen Stevens) is Cindy's mother.
- Charles (찰스; Chalseu) (voiced by Ted Lewis) is a boy with black hair and glasses. He is also Peter, Johnny, and Cindy's classmate. Charles' hobby is reading fairy tales; he's a rather nerdy smart student. He is more quiet and timid than his other friends.
- Tommy (토미; Tomi) (voiced by Jimmy Zoppi) is a firefighter. He doesn't live in Broom's Town.

=== Villains ===
- Truck-X (트럭 X; Teureok X) is a kidnapper truck, who has been disguising himself as all kinds of trucks (such as a toy delivery truck), he only appeared in Brave Mr. Musty. He tricked Mini and her friends by being a toy delivery truck, and kidnapped them, but got caught and arrested by Poli and his teammates.
- Poacher (포처; Pocheo) is a hunter jeep, who has been hunting for animals. In his only appearance in Move Out! Battle in the Woods, Poacher hunted the deer, but got caught and arrested by the Brooms Town rescue team and the mountain rescue team.
- James (제임스; Jeimseu) is a stranger, who has been up to bad, he only appeared in Don't Go with Strangers. He tricked Peter and Johnny by being an ice cream man, and kidnapped Peter, when they mentioned the rescue team, but got caught and arrested by Poli, when Johnny called for help.

=== Others ===
- Annie (애니; Aeni) is best friends with Mary. She likes to hangout with her, But only on occasions.
- Andy (앤디; Aendi) is best friends with Mary, Tim, Toby, and Annie.
- Benny (베니; Beni) is a Hyundai Porter, who is nice, neat and very frantic boy. He likes to hang out with his best friends, Mini and Rody.
- Betty (베티; Beti) is Mr. Wheeler's granddaughter, who lives in a different country.
- Bruner (브루너; Beuruneo) is a yellow backhoe loader/bulldozer who is a member of The Construction Team. However, he looks more like a robot than a backhoe loader. He is also the big cousin of Bruny.
- Bruny (브루니; Beuruni) is a yellow loader who is the little cousin of Bruner. He is also too young to be a member of The Construction Team.
- Camp (캠프; Kaempeu) (voiced by Kerry Shale) is a cyan recreational vehicle who is a camper, He always has been camping in the woods since when he was little. He was mean and nasty, but for now, he is now friends with Poli and his teammates.
- Cap (캡; Kaep) is a yellow taxi who is best friends with Posty. But sometimes they argue at each other, Although they both stay the same. He is very fast and hates being dirty.
- Cici (씨씨; Ssissi) is a container ship who works at the harbor. She is a member of the Harbor Team and is friends with Lefy, Leky, and Lety.
- Cleany (클리니; Keullini or Kundalini) is a green street sweeper who is sometimes clumsy, But is good with his friends and his job as cleaning all over Broom's Town.
- Daisy (데이지; Deiji) is a light orange recreational vehicle. She is the grandmother of Rose and Marie. She has a beautiful garden and loves plants. She is close with Poke and teaches him how to care for plants and trees.
- Dump (덤프; Deompeu) is a dump truck who is the leader of The Construction Team, He is also best friends with Titan.
- Hannah (한나; Hanna) is Maya's mother.
- Jessie (제시; Jesi) is a girl, who wears glasses, and likes to go for a walk with her mom.
- Leky, Lety and Lefy (레키, 레티, 레피; Reki, reti, repi) are a trio of three triplet cranes who are part of The Harbor Team. Leky is yellow, Lefy is orange, and Lety is sky blue. Leky is responsible, Lefy is strong and Lety is smart.
- Lifty (Korean: 리프티; RR: Ripeuti) is a forklift who is a member of The Harbor Team, he is friends with Cleany and Terry.
- Luke (루크; Rukeu) is a black boy.
- Marine (Korean: 마린; RR: Marin) is a lifeboat who is a member of The Harbor Team, he is a lucky sailor who is sometimes the guardian of the crew, he also has a pet dolphin named Ming Ming.
- Mary (메리; Meri) is a girl and calm, shy and a good friend to The Rescue Team. She is well-behaved just like her friend Annie.
- Max (맥스; Maekseu) is a lazy road roller/steamroller who is part of The Construction Team. He has a bad memory and is slow. He also has a pet goldfish named "Mini Max"
- Maya (마야; Maya) is Hannah's daughter.
- Micky (믹키; Mikki) is a cement mixer who is part of The Construction Team. He is bad at ball games (the reason for why he sometimes berates his friends and is misunderstood) and his hobby is listening to music. He is not a main member of the Construction Team, but he is friends with them.
- Mini (미니; Mini) (voiced by Lisa Ortiz) is a Kei car who is sweet, shy and soft. She is best friends with Rody and Benny and the granddaughter of Musty. For some reason she isn't cab-forward like Benny and Rody.
- Ming Ming (밍밍; Mingming) is Marine's dolphin.
- Mr. Builder (빌더; Bildeo) is the master of The Construction Team. He is tough and short tempered and often shouts at them. He thinks of Micky as immature.
- Mr. Musty (머스티; Meoseuti) is a navy blue Lincoln Mark VIII who is elderly, loyal and calm. He is the mayor of Brooms Town and is Mini's grandfather.
- Mr. Wheeler (휠러; Hwilleo) is the store clerk of Brooms Town. He is sometimes snobbish, sarcastic and narcissistic, But he is good to Jin and The Rescue Team for his commands and actions. He is also Betty's grandfather.
- Ms. Belle (벨르; Belleu) is the harbor master. She likes fish.
- Poke (포크; Pokeu) is an excavator who is a member of The Construction Team. Unlike the rest of the characters, he doesn't talk (although he does mumble). He is an artist. He also likes flowers and gardening.
- Posty (포스티; Poseuti) is a mail auto rickshaw on three wheels who is a cheap, spectacular and vehicle. He is best friends with Cap and his job is delivering mail. He is a Piaggio Ape.
- Rody (로디; Rodi) (voiced by Sarah Natochenny) is a Hyundai Porter who is cool, selfish and mean. But he is good to his friends, Mini and Benny.
- Rose and Marie (로즈, 마리; Rojeu, mari) (Marie voiced by Christina Assaf-Costello) are little car twins. They are the granddaughters of Daisy. Rose has 1 leaf on her head while Marie has 2 leaves on her head.
- Ryan (라이언; Raieon) wears glasses, he has been writing "thank you" letter, now he's learned to write someone's address, and a return address.
- Sam (샘; Saem) is Annie and Mary's first classmate.
- School B (스쿨비; Seukulbi) is a school bus who is like a teacher to the kids and always make good deeds and starts dropping off and picking up kids from school.
- Spooky (스푸키; Seupuki) (voiced by Billy Bob Thompson) is a Mater-like tow truck (specifically a "boom" truck) who is mischievous, stubborn and timid, but is always helpful and is a good friend to the Rescue Team.
- Stacy (스테이시; Seuteisi) is the owner of the battery recharger station. She has brown hair and wears a dark-magenta outfit.
- Terry (테리; Teri) is a container semi tractor who is the leader of The Harbor Team and is a loyal friend to the crane triplets and is best friends with Lifty.
- Tim (팀; Tim) is Annie and Mary's second classmate.
- Titan (타이탄; Taitan) is a large dump truck who is best friends with Dump and a member of The Construction Team. He is not a main part of the Construction Team, but is friends with them.
- Tintin (틴틴; Tintin) (voiced by Barrett Leddy) is a mobile crane.
- Toby (토비; Tobi) is Annie and Mary's third classmate.
- Tracky (트랙키; Teuraekki) is a tractor who is a farmer who works in a barnyard with a farm. He is also like a boss to the crew.
- Trino (트리노; Teurino) is a train who is a fabulous new friend to come to Brooms Town Railroad Station.
- Whooper (후퍼; Hupeo) is a transit bus who is a wise villager like village guy in the neighborhood city of Broom's Town.
- Wonder (원더; Wondeo) is a purple vehicle that can perform puppet shows.

== Production ==
While in production, this series was selected for the section of full-length animation at Global Animation Project 2009 hosted by Korea Creative Content Agency (KOCCA), under the title of PiyoPiyo Friends.

== Broadcast ==
In the first half of 2012, the films were exported from South Korea to France, where it aired on Piwi+ and is now on Gulli. Internationally, the program currently airs on French and Taiwanese channels. The series aired in Japan on TV Tokyo between April 6, 2013, and September 24, 2014. It also aired in South Korea channel on Tooniverse.

An English dub of Robocar Poli airs in Singapore on Okto. In Canada, it debuted on Treehouse TV on January 6, 2018, while in French Canada, the series premiered on Télé-Québec on June 28, 2020. It is also available on Netflix (in February 2021, it was announced that it would be leaving Netflix as of March 28, 2021 for repairs. It only left for 3 days, returning on March 31, 2021. In 2026 it was announced it was Leaving Netflix Again on March 30. It is right now unknown if it will be back on Netflix soon or not.) and YouTube. A separate British dub of the series began airing on Nick Jr. Too in the UK starting February 27, 2017 and Tiny Pop. In the United States, it aired on the Nick Jr. Channel on June 15, 2015 for sometime. In Portugal, it airs on RTP2 and Canal Panda, and in Spain on Clan. In Italy, it premiered on February 13, 2017 on Cartoonito.

== Episodes ==
Season	Episodes	Originally released	
Season	Episodes	First released	Last released
1	26	February 28, 2011	July 12, 2011
2	26	December 26, 2011	May 15, 2012
3	26	February 26, 2014	May 22, 2014
4	26	August 31, 2015	November 24, 2015
5	16	March 4, 2022	December 13, 2022

== Reception ==
This series has had high ratings in South Korea, and became the chief rival of Pororo the Little Penguin which had been number one in the industry. Related merchandise includes cakes, toys, books, and apparel. In South Korea, Poli is frequently called Polchongni (폴총리) which means "Poli, the Minister of Children". This follows Pororo, who is famously known as Ppotongnyeong (뽀통령), meaning "Pororo, the President of Children".

== Merchandise ==
On March 12, 2013, Korea Post issued commemorative stamps for the series. As the third installment of the "Korean-Made Characters Series Stamps", Robocar Poli was introduced, following the introduction of Pororo the Little Penguin and Pucca. Two million copies of the stamps were printed for sale (10 copies per set).

== Spin-offs ==
=== Traffic Safety with Poli ===
Traffic Safety with Poli (폴리와 함께하는 교통안전 이야기; Polliwa hamkkehaneun gyotonganjeon iyagi) is a first spin-off of the original series. As part of Hyundai Motors' global corporate social responsibility project with RoiVisual and EBS, the series was produced to educate children on the importance of traffic safety, and has aired for two seasons. The first season of the spin-off was shown as six 11-minute episodes, each with two segments. In Singapore, it debuted on Okto on December 27, 2015. It premiered in Canada on Treehouse TV on February 2, 2019.

Season	Episodes	Originally released	
Season	Episodes	First released	Last released
1	12	December 5, 2011	December 20, 2011
2	14	March 1, 2013	May 31, 2013

=== Fire Safety with Roy ===
Fire Safety with Roy is the second spin-off of the original series. Centered on Roy, it debuted in August 2017 on EBS. In Singapore, it debuted on Okto on December 8, 2018.

=== Daily Life Safety with Amber ===
Daily Life Safety with Amber is the third spin-off of the original series. Centered on Amber, it debuted in August 2018 on EBS. In Singapore, it debuted on Channel 5's Okto block on October 19, 2019. In America, it debuted on YouTube August 9, 2019.

== Special spin-off ==
SongSong Museum is the special musical spin-off of the original series. Centered on Rescue team, it debuted in July 2020 on EBS. It comprises 25 popular nursery rhymes and 1 creative song in 26 episodes.
