= Kaleb Nation =

American writer (born 1988)

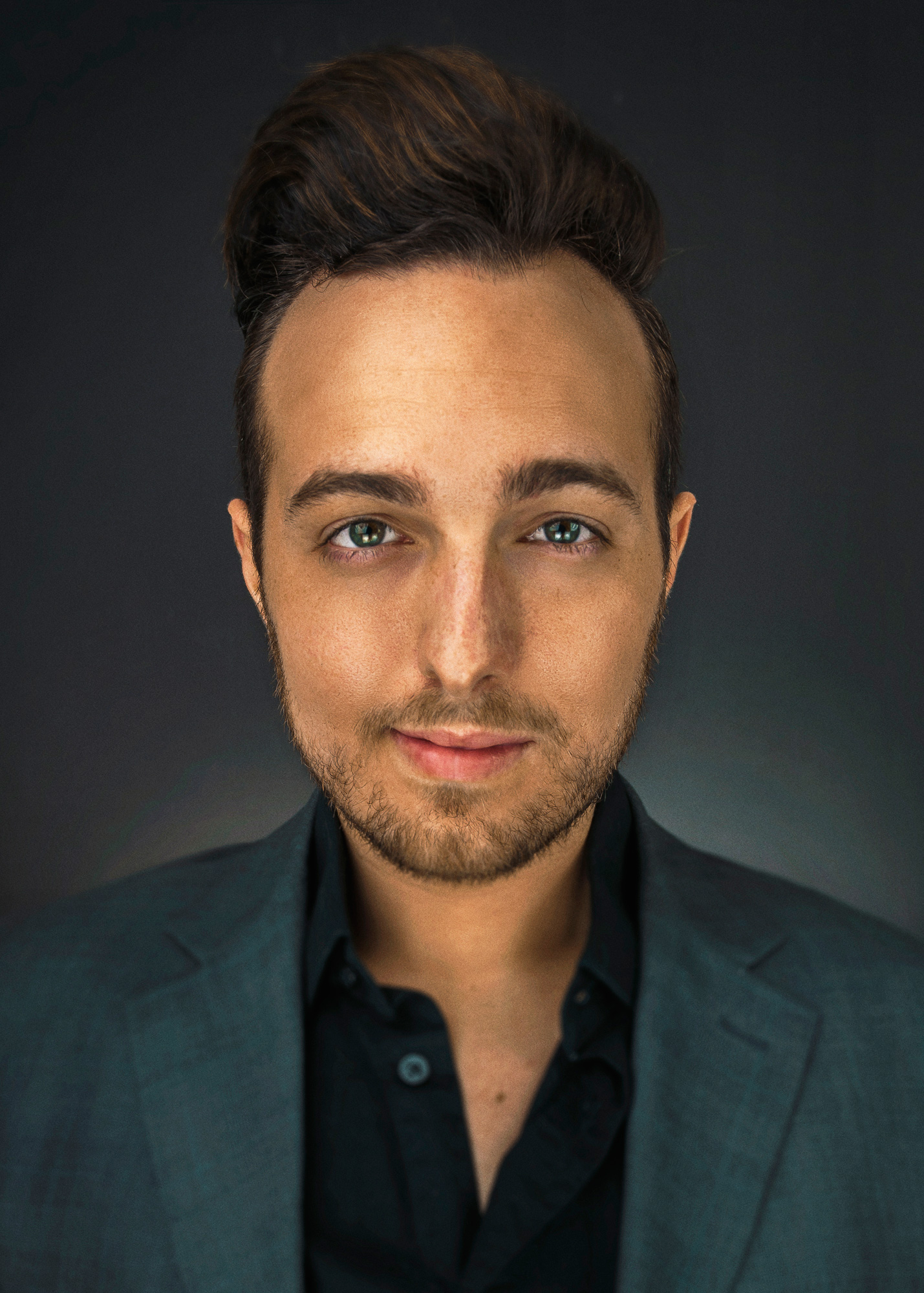
- Nation in mid-2015
- Born: Kaleb Allen Nation; September 16, 1988 (age 38); Texas, United States
- Occupations: Novelist; YouTube personality; blogger
- Spouse: Taylor Nation (m. 2015)
- Writing career
- Years active: 2009–present
- Genres: Fantasy, Young adult fiction, Thriller
- Website: kalebnation.com

Signature
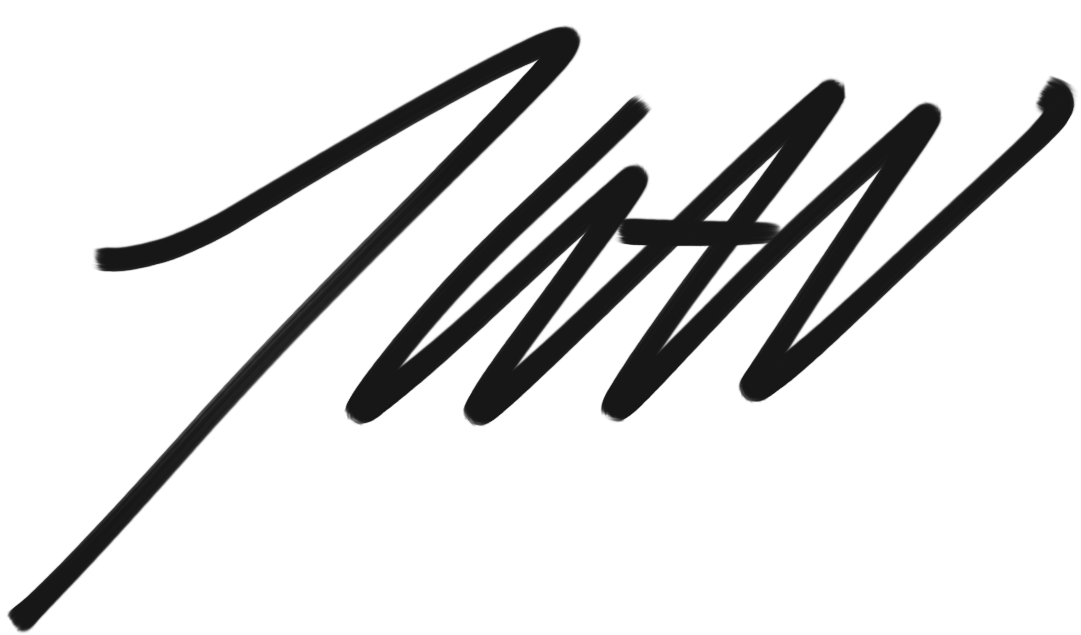

Kaleb Nation (born September 16, 1988) is an American writer, executive producer, and YouTube personality. He currently resides in Los Angeles, California.

== Writing career ==
=== 2009–2010 ===
Nation began writing his first novel at the age of 14 on the night of March 3, 2003. Following six years of writing, Nation's novel Bran Hambric: The Farfield Curse was published by Sourcebooks and Scholastic on September 9, 2009, in the United States, the United Kingdom, and Canada. The book was translated into Portuguese by Panini Brazil and into Russian by Eksmo under the author name "Kaleb Neyshn".

In 2010, the second book in the "Bran Hambric" series was published, titled Bran Hambric: The Specter Key.

=== 2011–2014 ===
In November 2011, Nation completed his first novel for young adults. The book was called a "supernatural conspiracy theory novel". Harken was published on January 13, 2013.

=== 2019–present ===
In 2019, Nation was named executive producer of Ask Dr. Drew, a live streaming program hosted by Drew Pinsky. Nation is credited as the producer of over 400 episodes of Ask Dr. Drew.

== Television ==
On January 30, 2014, Nation appeared in a segment of the nightly TV news program Dr. Drew On Call on HLN called "Hooked: Social Media Stars." He was later added as a regular commentator focussing on social media trends. Following this appearance, Nation and Drew Pinsky began to collaborate on media projects, including the launch of Pinsky's live streaming series Ask Dr. Drew in 2019.

In June 2015, Nation and his fiancée Taylor Elizabeth were featured on Good Morning America for a segment about online relationships.

On January 8, 2016, Nation appeared in an episode of TLC's Say Yes to the Dress: Atlanta titled "A Little Sparkle Goes a Long Way" featuring his wedding to fellow YouTube personality Taylor Elizabeth.

== Radio ==
Nation hosted his first radio show at age 13 in Austin, Texas, under the pseudonym Kaleb Krew. By age 17, Nation's show was nationally syndicated and broadcast in over 20 states and countries. The show ended in 2009 after Nation's first novel was published.

== YouTube ==
Nation began his career as a viral video producer on YouTube in 2009. As of October 2013, Nation's YouTube channel "kalebnation" has 74,000 subscribers and 49 million video views.

His second channel "60SR" has over 18,000 subscribers and 12 million video views. In May 2012, Nation announced that his channel "60SR" had joined digital media company PMC to become a daily, 60-second entertainment web show. The show ended regular production in August 2013.

In 2011, Nation appeared on stage at YouTube convention Playlist Live with a panel of authors. He is a regular attendee of YouTube convention VidCon.

In 2019, Nation was honored on stage at Vidcon as a Founding Featured Creator alongside John Green, Hank Green, Shaycarl, Dave Days, Olga Kay, and Michael Buckley.

== Other work ==
From 2009 to 2011, Nation wrote for TwilightGuy.com, a website dedicated to the Twilight series of books by Stephenie Meyer. The website was featured in BusinessWeek and Entertainment Weekly. Nation also appeared in the documentary Twilight in Forks: The Saga of the Real Town and was profiled by the Huffington Post when a parody he posted of Pottermore became a viral hit.

In May 2012, Nation starred in "Princess Charming", a music video by Megan and Liz.

In December 2013, Nation made a cameo appearance in Rebecca Black's "Saturday" music video.

== Personal life ==
Nation resides in Los Angeles, California with a chinchilla named Chilla and a puppy named Selfie.

He is married to fellow YouTube personality Taylor Elizabeth Nation, whom he met in 2010 at YouTube convention Playlist Live and began dating in 2012 at Vidcon. On June 7, 2014, Nation proposed at Digifest in New York City on stage in front of a crowd of over 12,000. Their relationship was featured in the 2017 documentary Internet Kids.

Nation attended the University of Texas but left after signing his first book deal. He is a black belt in taekwondo.

== Books ==
- Bran Hambric: The Farfield Curse (2009)
- Bran Hambric: The Specter Key (2010)
- Harken (2013)
