= The Pit Dragon Chronicles =

Novel series by Jane Yolen

The Pit Dragon Chronicles is a series of science fantasy novels by Jane Yolen. An omnibus volume collects the three volumes. According to Yolen, the trilogy is among her books which are often translated into other languages, and they have also been considered to be among her best known books. A fourth book in the series was published in 2009.

== Premise ==
The books are set in the far future, on a desert planet called Austar IV, which has a history and climate similar to that of Australia.

== The series ==
=== Dragon's Blood (1982) ===
The story starts with a bond boy named Jakkin, working with many others in Sarkkhan's dragon nursery.

Jakkin plans to steal a baby dragon from the farm to raise, hoping to train the dragon to fight and earn him enough money to buy himself out of bond. He eventually succeeds after having been badly injured during the day's work, as one of the hatchling dragons was "miscounted", thus no one would notice if it was missing, though it is eventually revealed that Sarkkhan had purposely given him the opportunity to steal the hatchling, knowing that Jakkin was literate and could read the breeder's chart posted on the door.

Jakkin stows the tiny dragon away to an oasis that he had previously found. Akki, a girl at the nursery, eventually discovers his secret, and helps him, building a strong relationship in the process. After a full year of training and growing, Akki arranges a way for Jakkin and his beautiful red dragon to get to the pits. The red dragon’s first battle is hard won, and as it turned out too late for Jakkin, Sarkkhan was watching the fight. Fortunately, Sarkkhan took well to the idea of Jakkin raising the dragon, even admitting that he had known about Jakkin’s secret all along. Triumphant, after Sarkkhan tells him that it's a girl, Jakkin names his dragon "Heart’s Blood".

As the story continues, Jakkin finds out more about the strained relationship between Sarkkhan and Akki. In the end, Akki leaves the nursery.

=== Heart’s Blood (1984) ===
Jakkin is now a master and no longer a bonder. However, he still works at the nursery to pay off his debt to Sarkkhan. It’s been almost a year since Heart’s Blood’s first fight and the day Akki left. Heart's Blood is gravid, and Erikkin is Jakkin's bonder.

One day, a Senator named Golden comes with a note from Akki and asks Jakkin to spy on the rebels. Austar is a Protectorate, not a Federation Planet. If Austar became a Federation planet, the master and bonder system, as well as Pit fights, will become obsolete. Austar is useful to the Federation as one of the at all. Golden's job is to know what the rebels are up to, and to prevent them from using violence. He tells Jakkin that Akki needs his help and wants to know if he is a man. Although Jakkin does not know what would be best for Austar, and he does not want to leave Heart's Blood, he eventually agrees in order to rescue Akki.

Heart's Blood lays her eggs and five hatch. Jakkin bonds with the hatchlings by letting them taste his blood. A note is sent telling Jakkin to meet at Rokk Major. Jakkin spends the next few days very annoyed with Erikkin, and training S'Blood.

S'Blood wins the fight but is hamstrung, and killed in the Stews. Jakkin vows never to let this happen to his dragon. Jakkin gets lost and meets Dr. Henkky who tells him not to trust Golden.

Jakkin returns to Rokk Major with Heart's Blood and wins the pit fights. After going to bars with Sarkkhan and drinking chikkar, a man dies in front of Jakkin, telling him to be careful of the Rebel Hideout. The cell leader replaces Jakkin with #3, the man who died, and Jakkin is reunited with Akki, at the cell meeting. They are given the task of taking a package to the Pit, and told if they open it, it will explode. Heart's Blood wins the fight, and they tell Sarkkhan about the package. He tells them he will guard it, and they should return to the Nursery. Leaving in the truck, they witness an explosion that destroys Rokk Major's pit, and kills Sarkkhan. Golden meets them back at the nursery, but the Wardens are not far behind. The Rebels framed Jakkin, and Erikkin betrays him to the Wardens. Likkarn tells them to run to the mountains and stays to fight the Wardens, using his weed fury.

Golden, Jakkin, and Akki flee to the mountains, but Golden is badly injured. Pursued by the Wardens, they are forced to leave Golden behind in a cave which they had sheltered in during Dark After, using Heart's Blood's body as a door and heater. Jakkin manumits the traitorous Erikkin, and Heart's Blood dies from a stinger shot in the neck, her body saving Jakkin and Akki. The only shelter they have during Dark After, is Heart's Blood's body, so they crawl into her birth sac. In the morning, Jakkin and Akki are reborn out of the dragon blood, and became the first real human Austarians, linked to each other and Heart's Blood's five hatchlings.

=== A Sending of Dragons (1987) ===
Jakkin and his beloved Akki are currently living in the mountains, having escaped from some oppressive situations that caused them to be on the run. Jakkin and Akki are now able to communicate the way the dragons can, due to their "rebirth" from Heart's Blood carcass. They share home with all the small dragons that Heart's Blood gave birth to, and acts like parents to them. Threatened by the sighting of a strange helicopter, the two decide, rather than fight, to try and hide by taking refuge in the labyrinth of caves inside of the mountain. In the caves, they meet a strange people who think dull thoughts in dull colors. This is how they comunicate, speaking seams like a childish habit to them. They get this ability from using female dragons and after whitness how they kill female dragons to give babies dragonlike abilities, Jakkin and Akki decide to escape. They rescue one female dragon with them. They gets help in this by Heart's Bloods children. Outside the realise they must meet the enemy and so they realise that it was Golden who had searched for them.

=== Dragon’s Heart (2009) ===
Austar IV isn't the planet it once was, and when Jakkin and Akki finally return to the dragon nursery, their homecoming arouses mixed emotions. Together they've survived the insurmountable, and now they can weather the brutal conditions of Dark After and communicate with the dragons they love. But with this knowledge comes responsibility. What they've learned about survival could transform the planet—or, if entrusted to the wrong hands, bring about its destruction. Akki's insistence that she return to the Rokk to finish her training and begin new experiments drives a chasm between her and Jakkin. Suddenly she finds herself in the middle of a political battle that could claim her life. Only Jakkin can save her.

== Reaction ==
Yolen said that there were objections to Jakkin committing the act of stealing in Dragon's Blood.
