= Dexter Palmer =

American novelist and short-story writer (born 20th century)

- Education: Stetson University; Princeton University (PhD)
- Occupations: Novelist, short story writer

Dexter Palmer (born 20th century) is an American novelist and short story writer.

His novels are notable for bringing a literary, character-driven sensibility to genres like steampunk, speculative fiction, and historical fiction, and to themes like time travel.

== Biography ==
He attended Stetson University as an undergraduate. He holds a Ph.D. in English Literature from Princeton University.

In 2012, he participated in the Key West Literary Seminar: "Yet Another World: Literature of the Future".

== Writing ==
Palmer has published three books.

His first novel, The Dream of Perpetual Motion (2010), was inspired by Shakespeare's The Tempest. Writing in The New York Times, novelist Jeff VanderMeer called it "a singular riff on steampunk – sophisticated, subversive entertainment that never settles for escapism." Fiction-writer Elizabeth Hand, reviewing The Dream of Perpetual Motion for The Washington Post, called it "an extravagantly wondrous and admirable first novel," noting a resemblance to the work of Angela Carter.

Palmer's second book, Version Control, (2016) appeared to wide acclaim. In a review for NPR, Jason Heller described the novel as "a thoughtful, powerful overhaul of the age-old time travel tale, one that doesn't radically deconstruct the genre so much as explore it more broadly and deeply." The book received a starred review in Kirkus Reviews, where it was compared to the novels of Jonathan Franzen, though its speculative elements were also noted. It was included on The Washington Post's list of "The Best Fantasy and Science Fiction of 2016"; as well as "Best of 2016" lists by GQ and BuzzFeed.

Palmer's third book, Mary Toft; Or, The Rabbit Queene (2019), is a work of historical fiction about Mary Toft, an 18th-century Englishwoman who perpetrated a medical hoax, claiming to give birth to dead rabbits. The book was widely praised by critics for its "impeccable research" and "deft, droll, and provocatively philosophical" writing. In The New York Times Book Review, Katherine Grant wrote of the novel: "it's neither philosophy posing as a story nor a patronizing sneer at those gullible folk of yesteryear. Rather, taking literary license with the title character's documented history, Palmer spins a cracking tale that, despite its disconcerting subject, is piquantly cheerful and compassionate." Writing in The Atlantic, Lily Meyer explored the novel's connection with other works of "scam fiction", including Patricia Highsmith's The Talented Mr. Ripley (1955) and Philip Roth's Operation Shylock (1993).

== Bibliography ==
- The Dream of Perpetual Motion (2010)
- Version Control (2016)
- Mary Toft; Or, The Rabbit Queen (2019)

== Personal life ==
Palmer lives in Princeton, New Jersey.

== See also ==
- List of American novelists
- List of people from New Jersey
