= William Shakespeare's Star Wars =

Book series by Ian Doescher

William Shakespeare's Star Wars is a series of plays by Ian Doescher that parody the style of William Shakespeare, with nine instalments adapting the films of the Skywalker Saga. The plays are written as Elizabethan tragedies, mixing blank verse poetry and stage scripts with Early Modern English stock characters and orthography. Sometimes Shakespeare is quoted, or rather, rewritten, like the following in William Shakespeare's Star Wars: Verily, A New Hope:

“[Luke, holding stormtrooper helmet.]
Alas, poor stormtrooper, I knew ye not,
yet have I taken both uniform and life
From thee. What manner of a man wert thou?
A man of inf'nite jest or cruelty?
A man with helpmate and with children too?
A man who hath his Empire serv'd with pride?
A man, perhaps, who wish'd for perfect peace?
What'er thou wert, goodman, thy pardon grant
Unto the one who took thy place: e'en me.”

== The original trilogy ==
- William Shakespeare's Star Wars: Verily, a New Hope (2013)
  - based on Star Wars: Episode IV – A New Hope
- William Shakespeare's The Empire Striketh Back: Star Wars Part the Fifth (2014)
  - based on Star Wars: Episode V – The Empire Strikes Back
- William Shakespeare's The Jedi Doth Return: Star Wars Part the Sixth (2014)
  - based on Star Wars: Episode VI – Return of the Jedi

All three volumes were subsequently released as William Shakespeare's Star Wars Trilogy: The Royal Box Set.

== The prequel trilogy ==
- William Shakespeare's The Phantom of Menace: Star Wars Part the First (2015)
  - based on Star Wars: Episode I – The Phantom Menace
- William Shakespeare's The Clone Army Attacketh: Star Wars Part the Second (2015)
  - based on Star Wars: Episode II – Attack of the Clones
- William Shakespeare's Tragedy of the Sith's Revenge: Star Wars Part the Third (2015)
  - based on Star Wars: Episode III – Revenge of the Sith

== The sequel trilogy ==
- William Shakespeare's The Force Doth Awaken: Star Wars Part the Seventh (2017)
  - based on Star Wars: The Force Awakens
- William Shakespeare's Jedi the Last: Star Wars Part the Eighth (2018)
  - based on Star Wars: The Last Jedi
- William Shakespeare’s The Merry Rise of Skywalker: Star Wars Part the Ninth (2020)
  - based on Star Wars: The Rise of Skywalker

== See also ==
- Shakespeare and Star Trek
- Shakespeare's influence
