= Ian Doescher =

American fiction writer (born 1977)

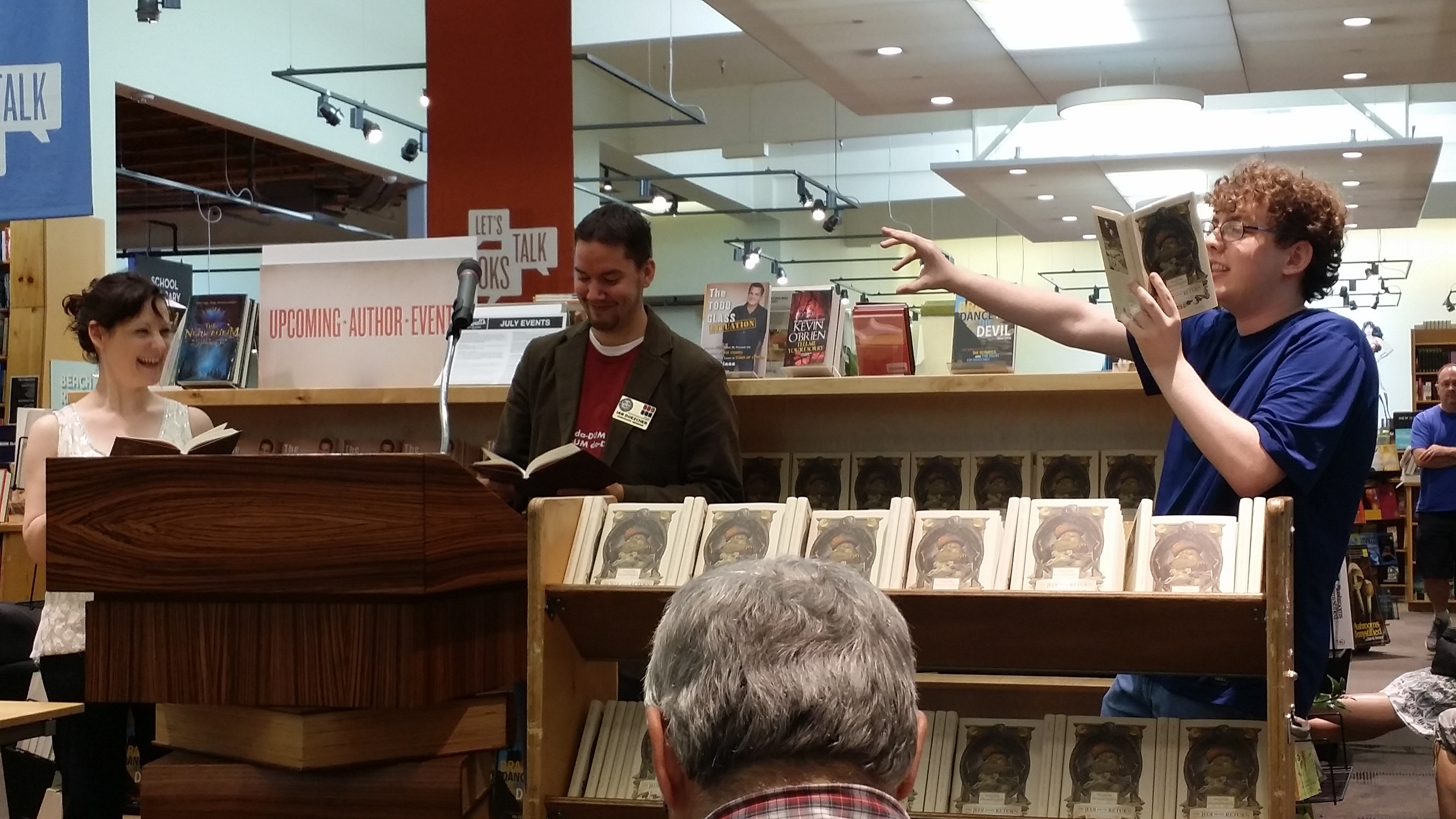
- At Powell's Bookstore in Beaverton, Oregon. Doescher (center) does a reading of The Jedi Doth Return with former classmate Anne Huebsch (left) and audience member Micah Read from Lincoln High School (right). July, 2014.
- Born: 1977 (age 48–49); Portland, Oregon, U.S.
- Education: Yale University (BA); Yale Divinity School (MDiv); Union Theological Seminary (PhD)
- Occupation: Writer
- Spouse: Jennifer Creswell
- Children: 2
- Writing career
- Language: English
- Notable work: William Shakespeare's Star Wars
- Website: iandoescher.com

Ian Doescher /ˈdɛʃər/ (born 1977) is an American fiction writer, best known as the author of the plays in the William Shakespeare's Star Wars series, parodic retellings of George Lucas's Star Wars films (1977–2005) in blank verse and the 16th-century style of William Shakespeare.

== Personal life ==
Doescher has a B.A. in Music from Yale University, a Master of Divinity from Yale Divinity School, and a Ph.D. in Ethics from Union Theological Seminary. He lives with his wife and two children in Portland, Oregon.

Doescher claims to be only a Star Wars and Star Trek fan and not well versed in other science-fiction literature. The idea for WSSW came to him when he went to the Oregon Shakespeare Festival in Ashland shortly after reading Pride and Prejudice and Zombies. After the first draft was shown to Lucasfilm, their response was "We like this and it’s fun, but we’d like to see Ian do more with it. Go ahead and have some more fun with it, and go out of bounds of movie itself", so he rewrote it.

== Publications ==
=== Literary works ===
- William Shakespeare's Star Wars:
  - William Shakespeare's Star Wars: Verily, a New Hope (2013)
  - William Shakespeare's The Empire Striketh Back: Star Wars Part the Fifth (2014)
  - William Shakespeare's The Jedi Doth Return: Star Wars Part the Sixth (2014)
    - William Shakespeare's Star Wars Trilogy: The Royal Imperial Boxed Set (2014)
  - William Shakespeare's The Phantom of Menace: Star Wars Part the First (2015)
  - William Shakespeare's The Clone Army Attacketh: Star Wars Part the Second (2015)
  - William Shakespeare's Tragedy of the Sith's Revenge: Star Wars Part the Third (2015)
  - William Shakespeare's The Force Doth Awaken: Star Wars Part the Seventh (2017)
  - William Shakespeare's Jedi the Last: Star Wars Part the Eighth (2018)
  - William Shakespeare’s The Merry Rise of Skywalker: Star Wars Part the Ninth (2020)
  - William Shakespeare's Star Wars The Mandalorian of Nevarro: Part the First (2026)
  - William Shakespeare's Star Wars: Ahsoka's Tale (2026)
- Pop Shakespeare:
  - William Shakespeare's Much Ado About Mean Girls (Pop Shakespeare Book 1) (2019)
  - William Shakespeare's Get Thee...Back to the Future! (Pop Shakespeare Book 2) (2019)
  - William Shakespeare's The Taming of the Clueless (Pop Shakespeare Book 3) (2020)
- William Shakespeare's Christmas Carol (2015)
- Marvel Shakespeare:
  - Deadpool: World's Greatest, Vol. 7: Deadpool Does Shakespeare (2017)
  - William Shakespeare's Avengers: The Complete Works (2021)
- "Palpatine" in From a Certain Point of View (2017)
- MacTrump: A Shakespearean Tragicomedy of the Trump Administration, Part I (2019; co-authored with Jacopo della Quercia)
- Shakespeare Horror:
  - William Shakespeare's Tragical History of Frankenstein (2020)
  - William Shakespeare's Dracula (2022)
  - William Shakespeare's Strange Case of Doctor Jekyll and Mister Hyde (2022)
- Bobby Bauman: A Novel (2022)

=== Non-literary works ===
On February 11, 2019, Doescher wrote the lyrics for the Star Wars parody of the Hamilton song "My Shot" for a YouTube video on his YouTube channel.
