= Audie Award for Romance =

The Audie Award for Romance is one of the Audie Awards presented annually by the Audio Publishers Association (APA). It awards excellence in narration, production, and content for an audiobook romance released in a given year. It has been awarded since 2005.

== Winners and finalists ==
=== 2000s ===
Year	Audiobook	Author(s)	Narrator(s)	Publisher	Result	Ref.
2005 10th	Kiss Me While I Sleep (2004)	Linda Howard	Joyce Bean and Dick Hill	Brilliance Audio	Winner	
2005 10th	Invitation to Provence (2001)	Elizabeth Adler	Carrington MacDuffie	Chivers North America	Finalist	
2005 10th	The Perfect Lover (2003)	Stephanie Laurens	Simon Prebble	Recorded Books	Finalist	
2005 10th	Sam's Letters to Jennifer (2004)	James Patterson	Anne Heche and Jane Alexander	Time Warner AudioBooks	Finalist	
2005 10th	The Summer I Dared (2004)	Barbara Delinsky	Linda Emond	Simon & Schuster Audio	Finalist	
2005 10th	The Virgin's Lover (2004)	Philippa Gregory	Graeme Malcolm	Simon & Schuster Audio	Finalist	
2006 11th	Origin in Death (2005)	J. D. Robb	Susan Ericksen	Brilliance Audio	Winner	
2006 11th	Chill Factor (2005)	Sandra Brown	Stephen Lang	Simon & Schuster Audio	Finalist	
2006 11th	A Good Yarn (2005)	Debbie Macomber	Linda Emond	HarperAudio	Finalist	
2006 11th	Rosie Dunne (2004)	Cecelia Ahern	Roger Rees, Moira Quirk, Ros Landor, and Russell Copley	Time Warner AudioBooks	Finalist	
2006 11th	The Tea House on Mulberry Street (2003)	Sharon Owens	Caroline Winterson	Listen & Live Audio	Finalist	
2007 12th	If You Could See Me Now (2005)	Cecelia Ahern	Susan Lynch and Rupert Degas	Hyperion Audio	Winner	
2007 12th	Born in Death (2006)	J. D. Robb	Susan Ericksen	Brilliance Audio	Finalist	
2007 12th	Darkfever (2007)	Karen Marie Moning	Joyce Bean	Brilliance Audio	Finalist	
2007 12th	Dear John (2007)	Nicholas Sparks	Holter Graham	Hachette Audio	Finalist	
2007 12th	The Tavern on Maple Street (2005)	Sharon Owens	Caroline Winterson	Listen & Live Audio	Finalist	
2008 13th	Natural Born Charmer (2007)	Susan Elizabeth Phillips	Anna Fields	HarperAudio	Winner	
2008 13th	Beyond the Highland Mist (1999)	Karen Marie Moning	Phil Gigante	BBC Audiobooks America	Finalist	
2008 13th	Consequences (2007)	Penelope Lively	Josephine Bailey	Tantor Audio	Finalist	
2008 13th	Everlasting (2007)	Kathleen E. Woodiwiss	Xanthe Elbrick	HarperAudio	Finalist	
2008 13th	On Tall Pine Lake (2007)	Dorothy Garlock	Anna Fields	Tantor Audio	Finalist	
2008 13th	Sugar Daddy (2007)	Lisa Kleypas	Jeannie Stith	Brilliance Audio	Finalist	
2009 14th	The Dark Highlander (2002)	Karen Marie Moning	Phil Gigante	Brilliance Audio	Winner	
2009 14th	Fire Me Up (2005)	Katie MacAlister	Barbara Rosenblat	Recorded Books	Finalist	
2009 14th	Forbidden (1997)	Suzanne Brockmann	Traci Svensgaard	Blackstone Audio	Finalist	
2009 14th	Mismatch (1989)	Tami Hoag	Jen Taylor	BBC Audiobooks America	Finalist	
2009 14th	Tribute (2008)	Nora Roberts	Jennifer Van Dyck	Brilliance Audio	Finalist	

=== 2010s ===
Year	Audiobook	Author(s)	Narrator(s)	Publisher	Result	Ref.
2010 15th	The Untamed Bride (2009)	Stephanie Laurens	Simon Prebble	HarperAudio	Winner	
2010 15th	Dark Slayer (2009)	Christine Feehan	Phil Gigante and Jane Brown	Brilliance Audio	Finalist	
2010 15th	The House on Tradd Street (2008)	Karen White	Aimee Bruneau	Listen & Live Audio	Finalist	
2010 15th	A Rogue of My Own (2009)	Johanna Lindsey	Rosalyn Landor	Brilliance Audio	Finalist	
2010 15th	What I Did for Love (2009)	Susan Elizabeth Phillips	Julia Gibson (narrator)	HarperAudio	Finalist	
2011 16th	Secret Diaries of Charlotte Brontë (2009)	Syrie James	Bianca Amato	Recorded Books	Winner	
2011 16th	Fantasy in Death (2010)	J. D. Robb	Susan Ericksen	Brilliance Audio	Finalist	
2011 16th	A Kiss at Midnight (2010)	Eloisa James	Susan Duerden	HarperAudio	Finalist	
2011 16th	The Elusive Bride (2010)	Stephanie Laurens	Simon Prebble	HarperAudio	Finalist	
2011 16th	By King's Command (2000)	Linda Lea Castle	Full cast	Siren Audio	Finalist	
2012 17th	New York to Dallas (2012)	J. D. Robb	Susan Ericksen	Brilliance Audio	Winner	
2012 17th	The Darkest Surrender (2011)	Gena Showalter	Max Bellmore	Audible	Finalist	
2012 17th	Notorious (2011)	Nicola Cornick	Katherine Kellgren	Audible	Finalist	
2012 17th	Summer Rental (2011)	Mary Kay Andrews	Isabel Keating	Macmillan Audio	Finalist	
2012 17th	When Beauty Tamed the Beast (2011)	Eloisa James	Susan Duerden	HarperAudio	Finalist	
2012 17th	The Winter Sea (2008)	Susanna Kearsley	Rosalyn Landor	Audible	Finalist	
2013 18th	The Witness (2012)	Nora Roberts	Julia Whelan	Brilliance Audio	Winner	
2013 18th	Don't Cry for Me (2012)	Sharon Sala	Kathe Mazur	Audible	Finalist	
2013 18th	The Madness of Lord Ian Mackenzie (2009)	Jennifer Ashley	Angela Dawe	Tantor Audio	Finalist	
2013 18th	Never Seduce a Scot (2012)	Maya Banks	Kirsten Potter	Tantor Audio	Finalist	
2013 18th	Scandalous Desires (2011)	Elizabeth Hoyt	Ashford MacNab	Hachette Audio	Finalist	
2014 19th	The Longest Ride (2013)	Nicholas Sparks	January LaVoy and Ron McLarty	Hachette Audio	Winner	
2014 19th	The Darkest Craving (2009)	Gena Showalter	Max Bellmore	Audible	Finalist	
2014 19th	For My Lady's Heart (2014)	Laura Kinsale	Nicholas Boulton	Hedgehog	Finalist	
2014 19th	Kissing Under the Mistletoe (2014)	Bella Andre	Eva Kaminsky	Oak Press	Finalist	
2014 19th	The Wanderer (2013)	Robyn Carr	Thérèse Plummer	Recorded Books	Finalist	
2015 20th	The Bridges of Madison County (1994)	Robert James Waller	Kelli O'Hara and Steven Pasquale	Hachette Audio	Winner	
2015 20th	Burn for Me (2014)	Ilona Andrews	Renee Raudman	HarperAudio	Finalist	
2015 20th	First Love (2014)	James Patterson	Lauren Fortgang	Hachette Audio	Finalist	
2015 20th	Just This Once (2012)	Rosalind James	Claire Bocking	ACZ/Rosalind Iiams	Finalist	
2015 20th	Rumor Has It (2013)	Jill Shalvis	Karen White	Tantor Audio	Finalist	
2016 21st	The Highwayman (2015)	Kerrigan Byrne	Derek Perkins	Tantor Audio	Winner	
2016 21st	The Duke's Holiday (2014)	Maggie Fenton	Sue Pitkin	Brilliance Audio	Finalist	
2016 21st	Never Judge a Lady by Her Cover (1992)	Sarah MacLean	Rosalyn Landor	HarperAudio	Finalist	
2016 21st	The Secrets of Sir Richard Kenworthy (2015)	Julia Quinn	Rosalyn Landor	HarperAudio	Finalist	
2016 21st	A Sorceress of His Own (2015)	Dianne Duvall	Kirsten Potter	Tantor Audio	Finalist	
2017 22nd	Dirty (1945)	Kylie Scott	Andi Arndt	Macmillan Audio	Winner	
2017 22nd	Duke of Sin (2016)	Elizabeth Hoyt	Ashford McNab	Hachette Audio	Finalist	
2017 22nd	First Star I See Tonight (2016)	Susan Elizabeth Phillips	Nicole Poole	HarperAudio	Finalist	
2017 22nd	Glitterland (2013)	Alexis Hall	Nicholas Boulton	Hedgehog Productions	Finalist	
2017 22nd	The Obsession (2016)	Nora Roberts	Shannon McManus	Brilliance Audio	Finalist	
2018 23rd	The Duchess Deal (2017)	Tessa Dare	Mary Jane Wells	HarperAudio	Winner	
2018 23rd	Any Day Now (2017)	Robyn Carr	Thérèse Plummer	Recorded Books	Finalist	
2018 23rd	Cake: A Love Story (2016)	J. Bengtsson	Andi Arndt and Joe Arden	J. Bengtsson	Finalist	
2018 23rd	Come Sundown (2017)	Nora Roberts	Elisabeth Rodgers	Brilliance Audio	Finalist	
2018 23rd	The Ladies' Room (2011)	Carolyn Brown	Donna Postel	Brilliance Audio	Finalist	
2019 24th	His Viking Bride (2018)	Olivia Norem	Greg Patmore	Olivia Norem	Winner	
2019 24th	Hello Stranger (2018)	Lisa Kleypas	Mary Jane Wells	Avon	Finalist	
2019 24th	Possession (2018)	Jessica Hawkins	Christian Fox	518 Books, Inc.	Finalist	
2019 24th	Shadow and Ice (2018)	Gena Showalter	Melissa Moran and Leo Barnabas	Harlequin Audio	Finalist	
2019 24th	Wanderlust (2018)	Lauren Blakely	Richard Armitage and Grace Grant	Audible Originals	Finalist	
2019 24th	The Wedding Date (2018)	Jasmine Guillory	Janina Edwards	Penguin Audio	Finalist	

=== 2020s ===
Year	Audiobook	Author(s)	Narrator(s)	Publisher	Result	Ref.
2020 25th	Devil's Daughter (2019)	Lisa Kleypas	Mary Jane Wells	HarperAudio	Winner	
2020 25th	The Bride Test (2019)	Helen Hoang	Emily Woo Zeller	Dreamscape	Finalist	
2020 25th	The Friend Zone (2019)	Abby Jimenez	Teddy Hamilton and Erin Mallon	Hachette Audio	Finalist	
2020 25th	Gimme Some Sugar (2019)	Molly Harper	Amanda Ronconi	Audible	Finalist	
2020 25th	Red, White & Royal Blue (2019)	Casey McQuiston	Ramon de Ocampo	Macmillan Audio	Finalist	
2021 26th	Dirty Letters (2021)	Vi Keeland and Penelope Ward	Andi Arndt and Jacob Morgan	Brilliance Audio	Winner	
2021 26th	Call Me Maybe (2020)	Cara Bastone	Luci Christian and Neil Hellegers	Audible Originals	Finalist	
2021 26th	Chasing Cassandra (2020)	Lisa Kleypas	Mary Jane Wells	HarperAudio	Finalist	
2021 26th	Get a Life, Chloe Brown (2019)	Talia Hibbert	Adjoa Andoh	HarperAudio	Finalist	
2021 26th	The Honey-Don't List (2020)	Christina Lauren	Patti Murin and Jon Root	Simon & Schuster Audio	Finalist	
2022 27th	Reel: Hollywood Renaissance	Kennedy Ryan	Ebony Flowers, Jakobi Diem, Nicole Small, and April Christina	Lyric Audiobooks	Winner	
2022 27th	The Charm Offensive	Alison Cochrun	Vikas Adam, Graham Halstead, and Cassandra Campbell	Simon & Schuster Audio	Finalist	
2022 27th	Mine to Protect	Kennedy L. Mitchell	Maxine Mitchell and Teddy Hamilton	Blue Nose Audio	Finalist	
2022 27th	Pause	Kylie Scott	Andi Arndt	Audible Originals	Finalist	
2022 27th	The Wrong Heart	Jennifer Hartmann	Stefanie Kay and Neill Thorne	Jennifer Hartmann	Finalist	
2023 28th	Delilah Green Doesn't Care	Ashley Herring Blake	Kristen DiMercurio	Penguin Random House Audio	Winner	
2023 28th	Crushing On You	Jen Trinh	Emily Woo Zeller and James Chen	Lyric Audiobooks	Finalist	
2023 28th	Love on the Brain	Ali Hazelwood	Brooke Bloomingdale	Penguin Random House Audio	Finalist	
2023 28th	Savvy Sheldon Feels Good As Hell	Taj McCoy	Adenrele Ojo	HarperAudio	Finalist	
2023 28th	Seatmate	Cara Bastone	Amanda Ronconi, Zachary Webber, Josh Hurley, Carol Monda, Corey Allen, Allyson Johnson, Eric Yves Garcia, Tanya Eby, and Dina Pearlman	Audible Originals	Finalist	
2023 28th	You Made A Fool of Death With Your Beauty (2022)	Akwaeke Emezi	Bahni Turpin	Simon & Schuster Audio	Finalist	
2024 29th	The True Love Experiment	Christina Lauren	Jonathan Cole and Cindy Kay	Simon & Schuster Audio	Winner	
2024 29th	10 Things That Never Happened	Alexis Hall	Will Watt	Dreamscape Media	Finalist	
2024 29th	Big Witch Energy	Molly Harper	Teddy Hamilton and Amanda Ronconi	Audible Originals	Finalist	
2024 29th	Butcher and Blackbird	Brynne Weaver	Joe Arden and Lucy Rivers	Blue Nose Publishing	Finalist	
2024 29th	French Holiday	Sarah Ready	Kelsey Navarro Foster	W.W. Crown	Finalist	
2025 30th	This Could Be Us	Kennedy Ryan	Ines del Castillo and Jakobi Diem	Hachette Audio	Winner	
2025 30th	Lights Out	Navessa Allen	Elena Wolfe and Jacob Morgan	Zando, LLC	Finalist	
2025 30th	Love You a Latke	Amanda Elliot	Kelli Tager	SAG-AFTRA	Finalist	
2025 30th	The Rom-Commers	Katherine Center	Patti Murin	Macmillan Audio	Finalist	
2025 30th	The Starter Ex	Mia Sosa	Noah B. Perez and Miranda Jay	Audible Originals	Finalist	
2026 31st	King of Envy	Ana Huang	Jason Clark and Nia Serge	One Night Stand Studios x Ana Huang	Winner	
2026 31st	Great Big Beautiful Life (2025)	Emily Henry	Julia Whelan	Penguin Random House Audio	Finalist	
2026 31st	Looking for Group	Alexis Hall	Will Watt, Sam Newton, Morag Sims, Rich Keeble, Matt Godfrey, and Chris Devon	Sourcebooks	Finalist	
2026 31st	Plus Size Player	Danielle Allen	Wesleigh Siobhan	Macmillan Audio	Finalist	
2026 31st	Say You'll Remember Me	Abby Jimenez	Christine Lakin and Matt Lanter	Hachette Audio	Finalist	
