= Audie Award for Multi-Voiced Performance =

English-language audiobook award

The Audie Award for Multi-Voiced Performance, established in 1996, is one of the Audie Awards presented annually by the Audio Publishers Association (APA). It awards excellence in audiobooks narrated by multiple performers who do not interact. Only English-language texts are eligible.

Between 1996 and 2001, two awards were presented annually, one for multi-voiced performance and one for multi-voiced narration.

== Winners and finalists ==
=== 1990s ===
Year	Category	Title	Author(s)	Narrators	Publisher	Result	Ref.
1996	Multi-Voiced Performance	Myst: The Book of Atrys	Rand Miller and Robyn Miller with David Wingrove	Eric Conger, Kevin Dewey, Bruch Goodh, Graeme Malcom, Annie Meisels, Alexandra Ospina, and Barbara Rosenblat	Random House Audio	Winner	
1996	Multi-Voiced Performance	Burns & Allen	Original Radio Broadcasts	George Burns and Gracie Allen	Radio Spirits, Inc.	Finalist	
1996	Multi-Voiced Performance	David Copperfield (1849–1850)	Charles Dickens (dramatized by Betty Davies)	Full cast (including Gary Cady, Miriam Margolyes, John Moffatt, Timothy Spall and Sheila Hancock)	Bantam Doubleday Dell Audio	Finalist	
1997	Multi-Voiced Narration	Grow Old Along with Me the Best is Yet to Be	Sandra Haldeman Martz	Edward Asner, Ellen Burstyn, CCH Pounder, and Alfre Woodard	Audio Literature	Winner	
1997	Multi-Voiced Narration	Star Wars: Return of the Jedi	George Lucas (adapted by Brian Daley)	Anthony Daniels, John Lithgow, Edward Asner, and a full cast	HighBridge Audio	Finalist	
1997	Multi-Voiced Narration	The Prince's Choice	William Shakespeare (selected by Charles, the Prince of Wales)	Full cast	HighBridge Audio	Finalist	
1998	Multi-Voiced Narration	Lewis & Clark: The Journey of the Corps of Discovery	Dayton Duncan	Ken Burns, Adam Arkin, Donovan Sylvest, David Magee, and Jason Culp	Random House Audio	Winner	
1998	Multi-Voiced Narration	Abuse of Power	Stanley Kutler	David Ackroyd, David Dukes, and William Windom	Dove Audio	Finalist	
1998	Multi-Voiced Narration	The War of the Worlds	H. G. Wells (adapted by Howard Koch)	Leonard Nimoy, Jerry Hardin, Gates McFadden, Dwight Schultz, Armin Shimerman, Brent Spiner, and Wil Wheaton	Listening Library	Finalist	
1998	Multi-Voiced Performance	Women in the Material World	Faith D'Alusio and Peter Menzel	CCH Pounder	Audio Literature	Winner	
1998	Multi-Voiced Performance	Star Wars—Dark Forces: Soldier of the Empire	William C. Dietz	Randall Berger and a full cast	HighBridge Audio	Finalist	
1998	Multi-Voiced Performance	Voices of the Civil War: Gettysburg	Time Life Books	Full cast	Time Warner AudioBooks	Finalist	
1999	Multi-Voiced Narration	The Complete Audio Bible, Old Testament	Dove Audio	Michael York and a full cast	Dove Audio	Winner	
1999	Multi-Voiced Narration	The New Testament	Oasis Audio	Max McLean	Oasis Audio	Finalist	
1999	Multi-Voiced Narration	Sales Closing for Dummies	Tom Hopkins	Tom Hopkins	HarperAudio	Finalist	
1999	Multi-Voiced Performance	The Titanic Disaster Hearings: The Official Transcripts of the 1912 Senate Investigation	Tom Kuntz	Michael York and a full cast	Dove Audio	Winner	
1999	Multi-Voiced Performance	Lost Civilizations: Pompeii	Time Life Books	Blair Brown, David McCallum, and a full cast	Time Warner AudioBooks	Finalist	
1999	Multi-Voiced Performance	Star Wars—Dark Forces: Rebel Agent	William C. Dietz	Full cast	HighBridge Audio	Finalist	

=== 2000s ===
Year	Category	Title	Author(s)	Narrators	Publisher	Result	Ref.
2000	Multi-Voiced Narration	The Diaries of Adam & Eve: Translated by Mark Twain	Mark Twain	Walter Cronkite, Betty Buckley, and Mandy Patinkin	Fair Oaks Audio	Winner	
2000	Multi-Voiced Narration	Friendship with God	Neale Donald Walsch	Neale Donald Walsch, Edward Asner, and Ellen Burstyn	NewStar Media, Inc.	Finalist	
2000	Multi-Voiced Narration	Song of the Sun	Andrew Harvey	Andrew Harvey	Sounds True	Finalist	
2000	Multi-Voiced Performance	Sherlock's Secret Life	Ed Lange and Will Severin	Karl Malden and a full cast	NYS Theatre Institute/Family Classic Audio Books	Winner	
2000	Multi-Voiced Performance	In the Name of Security	Peter Goodchild	David Hyde Pierce, John Rubinstein, John de Lancie, Ella Joyce, and Amy Pietz	L.A. Theatre Works	Finalist	
2000	Multi-Voiced Performance	Misadventures in the (213)	Dennis Hensley	Kathy Griffin, Jack Plotnick, Rachel Harris, Gregg Rainwater, Shane Jacobson, Rob Nash, Robert Abele, and Dennis Hensley	The Publishing Mills	Finalist	
2001	Multi-Voiced Narration	Pay It Forward (1999)	Catherine Ryan Hyde	Debra Monk and a full cast	Simon & Schuster Audio	Winner	
2001	Multi-Voiced Narration	Complete Shakespeare Sonnets	William Shakespeare	Kathleen Turner, Patrick Stewart, Al Pacino, Lindsay Crouse, Eli Wallach, and a full cast	Airplay	Finalist	
2001	Multi-Voiced Narration	Ten	W. Somerset Maugham	British cast	KCRW	Finalist	
2001	Multi-Voiced Performance	Cakewalk	Peter Feibleman	Elaine Stritch and Bruce Davison	L.A. Theatre Works	Winner	
2001	Multi-Voiced Performance	The Subtle Knife (1997)	Philip Pullman	Full cast	Random House Audio	Finalist	
2001	Multi-Voiced Performance	Too Dead To Swing	Hal Glatzer	Full cast	Audio-Playwrights	Finalist	
2002	Multi-Voiced Performance	The Amber Spyglass (2000)	Philip Pullman	Philip Pullman and a full cast	Listening Library	Winner	
2002	Multi-Voiced Performance	The Crucible (1953)	Arthur Miller	Richard Dreyfuss, Stacy Keach, Michael York, Fionnula Flanagan, Madolyn Smith, and René Auberjonois	L.A. Theatre Works	Finalist	
2002	Multi-Voiced Performance	War Letters	Andrew Carroll	Noah Wyle, Steve Zahn, and a full cast	Simon & Schuster Audio	Finalist	
2003	Multi-Voiced Performance	Big Mouth & Ugly Girl	Joyce Carol Oates	Hilary Swank and Chad Lowe	HarperAudio	Winner	
2003	Multi-Voiced Performance	Every Tongue Got to Confess	Zora Neale Hurston	Ruby Dee and Ossie Davis	HarperAudio	Finalist	
2003	Multi-Voiced Performance	Seek	Paul Fleischman	Full cast	Listening Library	Finalist	
2003	Multi-Voiced Performance	Shadowlands (1989)	William Nicholson	Harriet Harris, Martin Jarvis, and a full cast	L.A. Theatre Works	Finalist	
2003	Multi-Voiced Performance	The Slave	Isaac Bashevis Singer	David Chandler and Tracy Sallows	Jewish Contemporary Classics, Inc.	Finalist	
2004	Multi-Voiced Performance	Ghost Riders	Sharyn McCrumb	Dick Hill and Susie Breck	Brilliance Audio	Winner	
2004	Multi-Voiced Performance	A Patriot's Handbook	Caroline Kennedy	Neil Armstrong, Robert Frost, John McCain, Franklin Delano Roosevelt, Caroline Kennedy, James Earl Jones, Vanessa Williams, Edward M. Kennedy, and a full cast	Hyperion Audiobooks	Finalist	
2004	Multi-Voiced Performance	A Venetian Affair	Andrea di Robilant	Paul Hecht	Recorded Books, LLC	Finalist	
2004	Multi-Voiced Performance	Hey Nostradamus!	Douglas Coupland	Jenna Lamia, David Ledoux, Jillian Crane, and John Randolph Jones	HighBridge Audio	Finalist	
2004	Multi-Voiced Performance	The Misfits	James Howe	Spencer Murphy and the Full Cast Family	Full Cast Audio	Finalist	
2005	Multi-Voiced Performance	My Sister's Keeper (2004)	Jodi Picoult	Julia Gibson (narrator), Jenny Ikeda, Richard Poe and a full cast	Recorded Books, LLC	Winner	
2005	Multi-Voiced Performance	The Chronicles of Narnia (1950–1956)	C.S. Lewis	Kenneth Branagh and a full cast	HarperAudio	Finalist	
2005	Multi-Voiced Performance	Kiss Me While I Sleep	Linda Howard	Joyce Bean and Dick Hill	Brilliance Audio	Finalist	
2005	Multi-Voiced Performance	Queer Eye for the Straight Guy	Ted Allen	Ted Allen	Random House Audio	Finalist	
2005	Multi-Voiced Performance	Will They Ever Trust Us Again?	Michael Moore	Michael Moore and a full cast	Simon & Schuster Audio	Finalist	
2006	Multi-Voiced Performance	Raymond and Hannah	Stephen Marche	Kathleen McInerney and David LeDoux		Winner	
2006	Multi-Voiced Performance	Assassination Vacation	Sarah Vowell	Sarah Vowell	Simon & Schuster Audio	Finalist	
2006	Multi-Voiced Performance	Extremely Loud & Incredibly Close (2005)	Jonathan Safran Foer	Jeff Woodman, Barbara Caruso, and Richard Ferrone	Recorded Books	Finalist	
2006	Multi-Voiced Performance	The Historian (2005)	Elizabeth Kostova	Jim Ward, Rosalyn Landor, Robin Atkin Downes, Dennis Boutsikaris, and Joanne Whalley	Time Warner AudioBooks	Finalist	
2006	Multi-Voiced Performance	Life's Journeys According to Mister Rogers	Fred Rogers with Joanne Rogers (intro)	Lily Tomlin, BD Wong, Blair Brown, and Richard Kind with Joanne Rogers (foreword)	Time Warner AudioBooks	Finalist	
2007	Multi-Voiced Performance	World War Z (2006)	Max Brooks	Max Brooks, Alan Alda, John Turturro, and Rob Reiner		Winner	
2007	Multi-Voiced Performance	Airborn	Kenneth Oppel	David Kelly and a full cast	Full Cast Audio	Finalist	
2007	Multi-Voiced Performance	Operation Homecoming	Andrew Carroll	Joe Barrett, and David Birney	Blackstone Audio, Inc.	Finalist	
2007	Multi-Voiced Performance	Suite Francaise	Irène Némirovsky	Daniel Oreskes and Barbara Rosenblat	HighBridge Audio	Finalist	
2007	Multi-Voiced Performance	The Thirteenth Tale	Diane Setterfield	Ruthie Henshall and Lynn Redgrave	Simon & Schuster Audio	Finalist	
2008	Multi-Voiced Performance	Inspired by ... The Bible Experience (Old Testament)	Media Group	Angela Bassett, Cuba Gooding Jr., Samuel L. Jackson, Denzel Washington, and a full cast	Zondervan Publishing	Winner	
2008	Multi-Voiced Performance	Dune (1965)	Frank Herbert	Scott Brick, Simon Vance, and a full cast	Macmillan Audio	Finalist	
2008	Multi-Voiced Performance	I Am America (And So Can You!)	Stephen Colbert	Stephen Colbert with Paul Dinello, Kevin Dorff, Greg Hollimon, Evie McGee, David Pasquesi, Allison Silverman, Brian Stack, and Jon Stewart	Hachette Audio	Finalist	
2008	Multi-Voiced Performance	The Word of Promise...New Testament Audio Bible	Thomas Nelson, Inc.	Full cast	Thomas Nelson, Inc.	Finalist	
2008	Multi-Voiced Performance	Hollowville	Mary Jane Hansen	Bruce Dern	NYS Theatre Institute	Finalist	
2009	Multi-Voiced Performance	Mudbound	Hillary Jordan	Joely Collins, Peter Jay Fernandez, Kate Forbes, Ezra Knight, Brenday Pressley, and Tom Stechschulte	Recorded Books	Winner	
2009	Multi-Voiced Performance	Family Audio Bible		Dick Cavett, Marsha Mason, Andrew McCarthy, Martha Plimpton, and Tom Wopat	HarperAudio	Finalist	
2009	Multi-Voiced Performance	The Plague of Doves (2008)	Louise Erdrich	Peter Francis James and Kathleen McInerney	HarperAudio	Finalist	
2009	Multi-Voiced Performance	The Word of Promise Next Generation: New Testament	Nelson Bibles	Sean Astin, Cody Linley, AnnaSophia Robb, Jordin Sparks, and a full cast	Thomas Nelson, Inc.	Finalist	

=== 2010s ===
Year	Title	Author(s)	Narrators	Publisher	Result	Ref.
2010	Nelson Mandela's Favorite African Folktalkes	Nelson Mandela	Full Cast	Hachette Audio	Winner	
2010	The Canterbury Tales (c. 1400)	Geoffrey Chaucer	Full Cast (Ric Jerrom, Bill Wallis, Cameron Stewart, Mark Meadows, Kim Hicks, Maggie Ollerenshaw)	BBC Audiobooks America	Finalist	
2010	The Canterbury Tales (c. 1400)	Geoffrey Chaucer	Martin Jarvis and a full cast	Blackstone Audio, Inc.	Finalist	
2010	The Rivalry	Norman Corwin	Paul Giamatti, James Gleason, Lily Rabe, David Strathairn, and Shannon Cochran	L.A. Theatre Works	Finalist	
2010	The Word of Promise Audio Bible	Nelson Bibles	Michael York, Richard Dreyfuss, Gary Sinise, and a full cast	Thomas Nelson, Inc.	Finalist	
2011	Jitters	Adele Park	Full cast	Straight to Audio Productions	Winner	
2011	Great Classic Science Fiction	H. G. Wells, Stanley G. Weinbaum, Lester del Rey, Fritz Leiber, James H. Schmitz, Philip K. Dick, Frank Herbert, Andre Norton	Simon Vance, Nick Sullivan, Robert Fass, Katherine Kellgren, Stephen R. Thorne, Greg Itzin, Scott Brick, Barbara Rosenblat	AudioGO	Finalist	
2011	Room (2010)	Emma Donoghue	Michal Friedman, Ellen Archer, Robert Petkoff, and Suzanne Toren	Hachette Audio	Finalist	
2011	The Shadow Effect	Deepak Chopra, Debbie Ford, and Marianne Williamson	Deepak Chopra, Debbie Ford, and Marianne Williamson	HarperAudio	Finalist	
2011	The Importance of Being Earnest	Oscar Wilde	Emily Bergl, Charles Busch, Neil Dickson, Jill Gascoine, James Marsters, Christopher Neame, and Matthew Wolf	L.A. Theatre Works	Finalist	
2012	A Raisin in the Sun (1959)	Lorraine Hansberry	Judyann Elder, Rutina Wesley, Mirron Willis, and a full cast	L.A. Theatre Works	Winner	
2012	Bruiser	Neal Shusterman	Nick Podehl, Kate Rudd, Luke Daniels, and Laura Hamilton	Brilliance Audio	Finalist	
2012	The Graduate (1963)	Charles Webb and Terry Johnson, Calder Willingham, and adapted by Buck Henry	Kathleen Turner, Matthew Rhys, and a full cast	L.A. Theatre Works	Finalist	
2012	1Q84 (2009–2010)	Haruki Murakami and Jay Rubin, with Philip Gabriel (trans.)	Alison Hiroto, Marc Vietor, and Mark Boyett	Audible, Inc./Brilliance Audio	Finalist	
2012	The Watch That Ends the Night (2011)	Allan Wolf	Michael Page, Phil Gigante, Christopher Lane, Laural Merlington, and Angela Dawe	Brilliance Audio/Candlewick	Finalist	
2013	Dracula (1897)	Bram Stoker	Alan Cumming, Tim Curry, Simon Vance, Katherine Kellgren, Susan Duerden, John Lee, Graeme Malcolm, Steven Crossley, and a full cast	Audible, Inc.	Winner	
2013	My Awesome/Awful Popularity Plan	Seth Rudetsky	Seth Rudetsky and a full cast	Audible, Inc.	Finalist	
2013	October Mourning	Lesléa Newman	Lesléa Newman and a full cast	Brilliance Audio	Finalist	
2013	The Privilege of the Sword	Ellen Kushner	Ellen Kushner and a full cast	SueMedia Productions for Neil Gaiman Presents/ACX	Finalist	
2013	Suddenly, A Knock on the Door	Etgar Keret	Etgar Keret and a full cast	Macmillan Audio	Finalist	
2013	That is All	John Hodgman	John Hodgman and a full cast	Penguin Audio	Finalist	
2014	World War Z (2006)	Max Brooks	Martin Scorsese, Alfred Molina, and a full cast	Random House/Books on Tape	Winner	
2014	Ender's Game Alive	Orson Scott Card	Full cast	Audible, Inc.	Finalist	
2014	The Fall of the Kings	Ellen Kushner and Delia Sherman	Ellen Kushner and a full cast	SueMedia Productions for Neil Gaiman Presents/Audible, Inc.	Finalist	
2014	Snowbound	Richard S. Wheeler	Brian Hutchison, T. Ryder Smith, Robert Ian Mackenzie, James Colby, Cellest Ciulla, and Scott Sowers	Recorded Books	Finalist	
2014	William Shakespeare's Star Wars	Ian Doescher	Daniel Davis, Jonathan Davis, January LaVoy, and Marc Thompson	Random House Audio/Books on Tape	Finalist	
2015	The Graveyard Book	Neil Gaiman	Neil Gaiman, Derek Jacobi, Robert Madge, Clare Corbett, Miriam Margolyes, Andrew Scott, Julian Rhind-Tutt, and a full cast	HarperAudio	Winner	
2015	The Anatomy Lesson	Nina Siegal	Adam Alexi-Malle, Peter Altschuler, Emma Jayne Appleyard, Hannah Curtis, Gildart Jackson, Bruce Mann, and Steve West	Penguin Random House Audio	Finalist	
2015	Land of Love and Drowning	Tiphanie Yanique	Cherise Boothe, Korey Jackson, Rachel Leslie, and Myra Lucretia Taylor	Recorded Books	Finalist	
2015	A Long Time Gone	Karen White	Susan Bennett, Jennifer Ikeda, and Pilar Witherspoon	Recorded Books	Finalist	
2015	The Sixteenth of June	Maya Lang	Julia Whelan, Will Damron, and MacLeod Andrews	Brilliance Publishing	Finalist	
2015	Stars	Janis Ian and Mike Resnick (editors)	Janis Ian, Emily Rankin, Gabrielle du Cuir, John Rubinstein, Kathe Mazur, Kristoffer Tabori, Paul Boehmer, Sile Bermingham, Stefan Rudnicki and Susan Hanfield	Audible, Inc.	Finalist	
2016	Illuminae (2015)	Amie Kaufman and Jay Kristoff	Olivia Taylor Dudley, Lincoln Hoppe, and Johnathan McClain	Listening Library/Penguin Random House Audio	Winner	
2016	Clockwork Lives	Kevin J. Anderson and Neil Peart	Morgan Hallet, George Guidall, Richard Poe, Jim Jenner, Tandy Cronyn, Pete Bradbury, Barbara Rosenblat, and Brian Hutchison	Recorded Books	Finalist	
2016	How It Went Down	Kekla Magoon	Cherise Boothe, Shari Peele, Kevin R. Free, Avery Glymph, Patricia R. Floyd, and Brian Hutchison	Recorded Books	Finalist	
2016	Just Kids from the Bronx	Arlene Alda	Alan Alda, Arlene Alda, and Christina Delaine with Milton Glaser, Regis Philbin, Robert Klein, Gabrielle Salvatto, and Carlos Serrano	Macmillan Audio	Finalist	
2016	With Lee in Virginia (1890)	G.A. Henty	Brian Blessed, Sean Astin, Kirk Cameron, and a full cast	Heirloom Audio Productions	Finalist	
2017	Small Great Things	Jodi Picoult	Audra McDonald, Cassandra Campbell, and Ari Fliakos	Penguin Random House Audio / Books on Tape	Winner	
2017	Les Liaisons dangereuses (1782)	Choderlos de Laclos	Dominic West, Janet McTeer, Una Stubbs, Elaine Cassidy, Adjoa Andoh, Edward Holcroft, and Morfydd Clark	Audible Studios	Finalist	
2017	The Magic Strings of Frankie Presto (2015)	Mitch Albom	Mitch Albom, Roger McGuinn, Ingrid Michaelson, John Pizzarelli, Paul Stanley, George Guidall, and a full cast	HarperAudio	Finalist	
2017	Pruno, Ramen, and a Side of Hope	Courtney Lance and Nikki Pope	Whoopi Goldberg and Bill Kurtis	Post Hill Press	Finalist	
2017	Thomas Jefferson-From Boy to Man	Jayne D'Alessandro-Cox	James Brinkley, Alexander Brinkley, and Christina Rideout	James Brinkley/Jayne D'Alessandro-Cox	Finalist	
2017	A Wild Swan	Michael Cunningham	Lili Taylor and Billy Hough	Macmillan Audio	Finalist	
2018	Restart	Gordon Korman	Jonathan Todd Ross, Laura Knight Keating, Ramon de Ocampo, Andy Paris, Suzy Jackson, Graham Halstead, and John Kroft	Recorded Books	Winner	
2018	Lincoln in the Bardo	George Saunders	George Saunders, Nick Offerman, David Sedaris, and 163 others	Random House Audio	Finalist	
2018	The Seven Husbands of Evelyn Hugo	Taylor Jenkins Reid	Alma Cuervo, Robin Miles, and Julia Whelan	Simon & Schuster Audio	Finalist	
2018	The Tea Girl of Hummingbird Lane	Lisa See	Ruthie Ann Miles, Kimiko Glenn, and a full cast	Simon & Schuster Audio	Finalist	
2018	The X-Files: Cold Cases	Joe Harris, Chris Carter, and Dirk Maggs	David Duchovny, Gillian Anderson, Mitch Pileggi, William B. Davis, Tom Braidwood, Dean Haglund, and Bruce Harwood	Audible Studios	Finalist	
2019	Dreamland Burning	Jennifer Latham	Pyeng Threadgill and Luke Slattery	Hachette Audio	Winner	
2019	An American Marriage	Tayari Jones	Eisa Davis and Sean Crisden	HighBridge Audio	Finalist	
2019	Any Man	Amber Tamblyn	Glenn Davis, Ben Foster, Marc Maron, Jason Ritter, John Roberts, Russ Tamblyn, Amber Tamblyn, January LaVoy, Phoebe Strole, Robin Miles, Thérèse Plummer, Dan Bittner, James Fouhey, and Michael Crouch	HarperAudio	Finalist	
2019	Hans Christian Andersen's Fairy Tales	Hans Christian Andersen	F. Murray Abraham and a full cast	Penguin Random House Audio/ Listening Library	Finalist	
2019	Sadie (2018)	Courtney Summers	Dan Bittner, Rebecca Soler, Gabra Zackman, and Fred Berman	Macmillan Audio	Finalist	
2019	There There (2018)	Tommy Orange	Darrell Dennis, Shaun Taylor-Corbett, Alma Cuervo, and Kyla Garcia	Penguin Random House Audio	Finalist	

=== 2020s ===
Year	Title	Author(s)	Narrators	Publisher	Result	Ref.
2020	The Only Plane in the Sky: An Oral History of 9/11	Garrett M. Graff	Full 45-person cast	Simon & Schuster Audio	Winner	
2020	200 Women	Geoff Blackwell, Ruth Hobday, Sharon Gelman, Marianne Lassandro, and Kieran Scott	Full cast	Chronicle Books	Finalist	
2020	Daisy Jones & The Six	Taylor Jenkins Reid	Jennifer Beals, Benjamin Bratt, Judy Greer, Pablo Schreiber, and a full cast	Penguin Random House Audio	Finalist	
2020	Dooku: Jedi Lost (Star Wars)	Cavan Scott	Orlagh Cassidy, Euan Morton, Marc Thompson, Pete Bradbury, Jonathan Davis, Neil Hellegers, Sean Kenin, January LaVoy, Saskia Maarleveld, Carol Monda, Robert Petkoff, and Rebecca Soler	Penguin Random House Audio	Finalist	
2020	Hey, Kiddo (2018)	Jarrett J. Krosoczka	Jarrett J. Krosoczka, Jeanne Birdsall, Richard Ferrone, Jenna Lamia, and a full cast	Scholastic Audio	Finalist	
2021	Clap When You Land (2020)	Elizabeth Acevedo	Elizabeth Acevedo and Melania-Luisa Marte	HarperAudio	Winner	
2021	How the Penguins Saved Veronica	Hazel Prior	Helen Lloyd, Andrew Fallaize, and Mandy Williams	Penguin Random House Audio	Finalist	
2021	No Name	Wilkie Collins	Nicholas Boulton, Lucy Scott, Rachel Atkins, David Rintoul, Russell Bentley, and John Foley	Naxos AudioBooks c/o Naxos of America, Inc.	Finalist	
2021	The Switch	Beth O'Leary	Daisy Edgar-Jones and Alison Steadman	Macmillan Audio	Finalist	
2021	The Trial of the Chicago 7	Mark L. Levine, George C. McNamee, and Daniel L. Greenberg	J. K. Simmons, Jeff Daniels, Chris Jackson, Corey Stoll, John Hawkes, Chris Chalk, Luke Kirby, Norbert Leo Butz, George Newbern, and a full cast	Simon & Schuster Audio	Finalist	
2021	Women Who Wrote	Louisa May Alcott, Jane Austen, Charlotte Bronte, Emily Bronte, Gertrude Stein, and Phillis Wheatley	Chloe Dolandis, Jude Mason, and Tyra Kennedy	Thomas Nelson	Finalist	
2022	Heresy	Melissa Lenhardt	Barrie Kreinik, Bailey Carr, Ella Turenne, Nikki Massoud, Natalie Naudus, Imani Jade Powers, and James Fouhey	Hachette Audio	Winner	
2022	The Anatomy of Desire	L. R. Dorn	Santino Fontana, Shelby Young, Marin Ireland, JD Jackson, Dan Bittner, Vikas Adam, Gabra Zackman, Fred Berman, Darrell Dennis, Oliver Wyman, Jonathan Davis, Hillary Huber, Lisa Flanagan, and Sharahn LaRue	HarperAudio	Finalist	
2022	Bourdain	Laurie Woolever	Full 92-person cast	HarperAudio	Finalist	
2022	Four Hundred Souls: A Community History of African America, 1619–2019	Ibram X. Kendi, Keisha N. Blain (ed.)	Full 87-person cast	Penguin Random House Audio	Finalist	
2022	Twins	Varian Johnson	Ahnya O'Riordan, Grace Capeless, Mashari Bain, Malcolm Bowen, Antoinette Comer, André Blake, Armand Xavier, and Rufen-Blanchette	Scholastic Audio	Finalist	
2023	Sparring Partners	John Grisham	Jeff Daniels, Ethan Hawke, January LaVoy, and John Grisham	Penguin Random House Audio	Winner	
2023	The 1619 Project: A New Origin Story (2021)	Nikole Hannah-Jones and The New York Times Magazine, edited by Caitlin Roper, Ilena Silverman, and Jake Silverstein	Nikole Hannah-Jones, January LaVoy, Claudia Rankine, Nikky Finney, Janina Edwards, Dorothy Roberts, Shayna Small, Terrance Hayes, Khalil Gibran Muhammad, Yusef Komunyakaa, Eve L. Ewing, Karen Chilton, Aaron Goodson, Reginald Dwayne Betts, Erin Miles, Dominic Hoffman, Adenrele Ojo, Matthew Desmond, Tyehimba Jess, Tim Seibles, Jamelle Bouie, Cornelius Eady, Minka Wiltz, Martha S. Jones, Darryl Pinckney, ZZ Packer, Carol Anderson, Tracy K. Smith, Evie Shockley, Bryan Stevenson, William DeMeritt, Jasmine Mans, Trymaine Lee, A. Van Jordan, Yaa Gyasi, Linda Villarosa, Danez Smith, Terry McMillan, Anthea Butler, Rita Dove, Camille T. Dungy, Wesley Morris, Natasha Trethewey, Joshua Bennett, Chanté McCormick, Nafissa Thompson-Spires, Ron Butler, Kevin M. Kruse, Bahni Turpin, Gregory Pardlo, Ibram X. Kendi, JD Jackson, Jason Reynolds, and Sonia Sanchez	Penguin Random House Audio	Finalist	
2023	Acts of Violet	Margarita Montimore	Brittany Pressley, Amy McFadden, Dan Bittner, Fred Berman, Hillary Huber, Johnny Heller, Katharine Chin, Ramón de Ocampo, Suzanne Toren, and Alejandro Ruiz	Macmillan Audio	Finalist	
2023	The Butcher and the Wren	Alaina Urquhart	Sophie Amoss and Joe Knezevich	Zando	Finalist	
2023	The Many Daughters of Afong Moy	Jamie Ford	Jennifer Lim, Cindy Kay, Mirai, Natalie Naudus, Sura Siu, Emily Woo Zeller, Nancy Wu, and Jamie Ford	Simon & Schuster Audio	Finalist	
2023	Richard Marsh: The Beetle	Richard Marsh	Gunnar Cauthery, Jonathan Aris, Natalie Simpson, Andrew Wincott, and John Foley	Naxos AudioBooks	Finalist	
2024 29th	No Two Persons	Erica Bauermeister	Barrie Kreinik, Braden Wright, and a full cast	Macmillan Audio	Winner	
2024 29th	Coleman Hill	Kim Coleman Foote	Bahni Turpin and Dion Graham	Zando	Finalist	
2024 29th	The Ghost Sequences	A. C. Wise	Erica Sullivan, Traber Burns, and a full cast	Blackstone Publishing	Finalist	
2024 29th	Surely You Can't Be Serious: The True Story of Airplane!	David Zucker, Jim Abrahams, and Jerry Zucker	"Weird Al" Yankovic, Arne Schmidt, and a full cast	Macmillan Audio	Finalist	
2024 29th	Sing Her Down	Ivy Pochoda	Frankie Corzo, Kimberly M. Wetherell, and a full cast	Macmillan Audio	Finalist	
2025 30th	When the Sea Came Alive: An Oral History of D-Day	Garrett M. Graff	Edoardo Ballerini, Garrett M. Graff, and a full cast	Simon & Schuster Audio	Winner	
2025 30th	Anita de Monte Laughs Last	Xochitl Gonzalez	Stacy Gonzalez, Jonathan Gregg, and Jessica Pimentel	Macmillan Audio	Finalist	
2025 30th	Butcher	Joyce Carol Oates	Amy Shiels, Edoardo Ballerini, and a full cast	Penguin Random House Audio	Finalist	
2025 30th	Five Broken Blades	Mai Corland	Donald Chang, Greg Chun, Zion Jang, Sophie Oda, Jaine Ye, and Roger Yeh	Recorded Books, Inc.	Finalist	
2025 30th	From Here to the Great Unknown (2024)	Lisa Marie Presley and Byand Riley Keough	Julia Roberts and Riley Keough	Penguin Random House Audio	Finalist	
2025 30th	Snake Oil	Kelsey Rae Dimberg	Andi Arndt, Renata Friedman, and Kristen Sieh	HarperCollins Publishers	Finalist	
2026 31st	A Bird in the Air Means We Can Still Breathe	Mahogany L. Browne	Emana Rachelle, Ozzie Jacobs, Elena Rey, Mahogany L. Browne, Amir Royale, Nile Bullock, Andrea Emmes, Brandon Miles, Kiebpoli Calnek, Ali Nasser, Tyla Collier, Marie-Francoise Theodore, Ron Butler, and Chantelle Ramdeen	Penguin Random House Audio	Winner	
2026 31st	The Correspondent	Virginia Evans	Maggi-Meg Reed, Jane Oppenheimer, Carly Robins, Jeff Ebner, David Pittu, Chris Andrew Ciulla, Mark Bramhall, Petrea Burchard, Robert Petkoff, Kimberly Farr, Jim Seybert, Cerris Morgan-Moyer, Jade Wheeler, Peter Ganim, and Steve West	Penguin Random House Audio	Finalist	
2026 31st	Dragon Day	Bob Proehl	Hayley Atwell, Michael Chiklis, Aldis Hodge, Greta Lee, Jimmi Simpson, and a full cast	Audible Originals	Finalist	
2026 31st	Heartwood	Amity Gaige	Justine Lupe, Alma Cuervo, Rebecca Lowman, Ali Andre Ali, Cary Hite, and Helen Laser	Simon & Schuster Audio	Finalist	
2026 31st	Southtrack	Jason Reynolds	Nile Bullock, Mekhi Hewling, Jade Williams, Brandon Miles, Ryan Vincent Anderson, Amir Royale, Jasmin Richardson, Christopher Grant, Khaya Fraites, Nadine Simmons, Robb Moreira, We Ani, Rocky Anicette, Brandiss Seward, Siho Ellsmore, Tyrell Buckner, Gina Daniels, Karen Murray, Jonathan Beville, Karla Moore, and Ronald Peet	Penguin Random House Audio	Finalist	
