= Phil Gigante =

American narrator of audiobooks

James Philbrick "Phil" Gigante (born April 5, 1966 - November 14, 2025) was an American narrator of audiobooks. He won 11 Earphone Awards and 3 Audie Awards.

In 2015, he pleaded guilty to both accosting a minor for immoral purposes and possessing child sexually abusive material.

== Personal life ==
Gigante lived in Ludington, Michigan.

== Pedophilia ==
On July 10, 2015, Gigante was arrested and charged with accosting a minor for immoral purposes, possession of child sexually abusive material, and two counts of using computers to commit a crime, which could have resulted in 16- to 28-year felony charges.

On October 13, 2015, Gigante pleaded guilty to accosting a minor for immoral purposes and possessing child sexually abusive material. Based on a plea agreement, he was called "to serve four months in jail and three months at home on tether" with further sentencing in December of that year. The latter counts for using computers to commit a crime were dropped.

== Awards and honors ==
Year	Title	Author	Award	Result	Ref.
2007	Beyond the Highland Mist (1999)	Karen Marie Moning	Earphone Award	Winner	
2008	Beyond the Highland Mist (1999)	Karen Marie Moning	Audie Award for Romance	Finalist	
2008	Genesis of Shannara: The Gypsy Morph	Terry Brooks	Earphone Award	Winner	
2008	Savage Season (1990)	Joe R. Lansdale	Earphone Award	Winner	
2008	Sea of Poppies (2008)	Amitav Ghosh	Earphone Award	Winner	
2008	The Secret Servant (2007)	Daniel Silva	Audie Award for Thriller or Suspense	Finalist	
2009	The Dark Highlander	Karen Marie Moning	Audie Award for Romance	Winner	
2009	Dark Slayer (2009)	Christine Feehan	Earphone Award	Winner	
2009	The Bloody Shirt	Stephen Budiansky	Audie Award for History	Finalist	
2009	The Defector (2009)	Daniel Silva	Earphone Award	Winner	
2009	The Two-Bear Mambo (1995)	Joe R. Lansdale	Earphone Award	Winner	
2010	Dark Slayer (2009)	Christine Feehan	Audie Award for Romance	Finalist	
2010	The Rembrandt Affair (2010)	Daniel Silva	Earphone Award	Winner	
2010	Zombies Vs. Unicorns (2010)	Holly Black and Justine Larbalestier (Eds.)	Earphone Award	Winner	
2011	The Exquisite Corpse Adventure (2011)	The National Children's Book and Literacy Alliance	Earphone Award	Winner	
2011	The Stainless Steel Rat	Harry Harrison	Audie Award for Science Fiction	Winner	
2012	The Watch That Ends the Night (2011)	Allan Wolf	Audie Award for Distinguished Achievement in Production	Winner	
2012	The Watch That Ends the Night (2011)	Allan Wolf	Audie Award for Multi-Voiced Performance	Finalist	
2013	The Watch That Ends the Night (2011)	Allan Wolf	Amazing Audiobooks for Young Adults	Top 10	
2015	Dark Ghost (2015)	Christine Feehan	Earphone Award	Winner	
