= Thérèse Plummer =

American voiceover actress and audiobook narrator

Thérèse Plummer (born circa 1976) is an American voiceover actress and has narrated over 600 audiobooks.

== Personal life ==
Plummer is the fifth-born of eight kids. Her father was a professional actor, and her mother was a librarian.

On June 11, 2021, Plummer was involved in a car crash with a drunk driver, through which she sustained multiple injuries and required surgeries.

Plummer presently works in New York City and lives with her dog Butterfinger on the East Coast of the United States.

== Education and career ==
Plummer studied psychology and theatre at King's College, then worked with kids in crisis and mental health disorders. In this position, she began to see acting a form of therapy.

Later, Plummer worked a day job at a financial firm in New York City and landed some acting jobs off-Broadway. During this time, she took a course in audiobook recordings with Robin Miles, who told Plummer she should record books professionally. With Miles's help, Plummer gained new skills and began auditioning for roles circa 2005.

== Awards and honors ==
=== Awards ===
Year	Title	Author	Award	Result	Ref.
2011	Faith (2011)	Jennifer Haigh	Earphone Award	Winner	
2011	Sing You Home (2011)	Jodi Picoult	Earphone Award	Winner	
2013	The Junkie Quatrain	Peter Clines	Audie Award for Original Work	Finalist	
2013	We Are Water (2013)	Wally Lamb	Earphone Award	Winner	
2014	The Ballad of the Sad Café (1951)	Carson McCullers	Audie Award for Short Stories or Collections	Finalist	
2014	The Meaning of Maggie (2014)	Megan Jean Sovern	Earphone Award	Winner	
2014	The Wanderer	Robyn Carr	Audie Award for Romance	Finalist	
2015	Bread, Wine, Chocolate (2015)	Simran Sethi	Earphone Award	Winner	
2015	A New Hope (2015)	Robyn Carr	Earphone Award	Winner	
2016	Welcome to Night Vale	Joseph Fink and Jeffrey Cranor	Audie Award for Excellence in Marketing	Finalist	
2017	I Liked My Life (2016)	Abby Fabiaschi	Earphone Award	Winner	
2017	Perfect Little World (2017)	Kevin Wilson	Earphone Award	Winner	
2017	The Wolf Hour (2017)	Sara Lewis Holmes	Earphone Award	Winner	
2018	The Agony House (2018)	Cherie Priest	Earphone Award	Winner	
2018	Any Day Now	Robyn Carr	Audie Award for Romance	Finalist	
2018	Any Man	Amber Tamblyn	Earphone Award	Winner	
2018	Brass (2018)	Xhenet Aliu	Earphone Award	Winner	
2018	I Liked My Life (2016)	Abby Fabiaschi	Audie Award for Fiction	Finalist	
2018	A Perfect Universe (2018)	Scott O'Connor	Earphone Award	Winner	
2018	Sandpiper Cove	Irene Hannon	Audie Award for Faith-Based Fiction and Nonfiction	Finalist	
2018	See You in the Cosmos (2017)	Jack Cheng	Audie Award for Middle Grade Title	Winner	
2019	Any Man	Amber Tamblyn	Audie Award for Multi-Voiced Performance	Finalist	
2019	The Rogue: Planets Shaken	Lee W. Brainard	Audie Award for Faith-Based Fiction and Nonfiction	Finalist	
2019	Sadie	Courtney Summers	Audie Award for Multi-Voiced Performance	Finalist	
2019	Sadie	Courtney Summers	Audie Award for Young Adult Title	Winner	
2019	There's a Word for That (2019)	Sloane Tanen	Earphone Award	Winner	
2020	The Age of Light	Whitney Scharer	Audie Award for Fiction	Finalist	
2020	The Jetsetters (2020)	Amanda Eyre Ward	Earphone Award	Winner	
2020	The Only Plane In The Sky	Garrett M. Graff	Audie Award for Audiobook of the Year	Winner	
2020	The Only Plane In The Sky	Garrett M. Graff	Audie Award for Multi-Voiced Performance	Winner	
2020	Tools of Titans (2016)	Tim Ferriss	Earphone Award	Winner	
2021	Come Find Me	Erin Mallon	Audie Award for Audio Drama	Finalist	
2021	Tools of Titans (2016)	Tim Ferriss	Audie Award for Business and Personal Development	Finalist	
2021	It's Better This Way (2021)	Debbie Macomber	Earphone Award	Winner	
2022	The Project	Courtney Summers	Audie Award for Young Adult Title	Finalist	
2022	Youngbloods (2022)	Scott Westerfeld	Earphone Award	Winner	

=== Honors ===
Year	Title	Author	Honor	Ref.
2018	Sourdough	Robin Sloan	American Library Association Listen List	
2022	The Electric Kingdom	David Arnold	Amazing Audiobooks for Young Adults	

== Filmography ==
Year	Title	Role	Note
2008	Law & Order: Special Victims Unit	Andrea Patwin	1 episode: Lunacy
2009	The Good Wife	Rose Nerrick	1 episode: Crash
2009	Ahead of Time: The Extraordinary Journey of Ruth Gruber	Young Ruth	
2010	Iron Man: Extremis	Maya Hansen	6 episodes
2010-2011	Pokémon	Fennel	2 episodes: Fossil Revival! Ancient Mysterious Bird Archeos!!; Site of Dreams! Munna and Musharna!
2012	Lapse	Woman	
2012	Real Actors Read Yelp	Self / Reader	
2019	The Inconceivable Mountain	Müzzi	
2019	Virgin River	Caroline	1 episode: A Wounded Heart
2020	Home Shopped Holiday		
