= Gaithersburg Book Festival =

Annual literary festival in Maryland, US

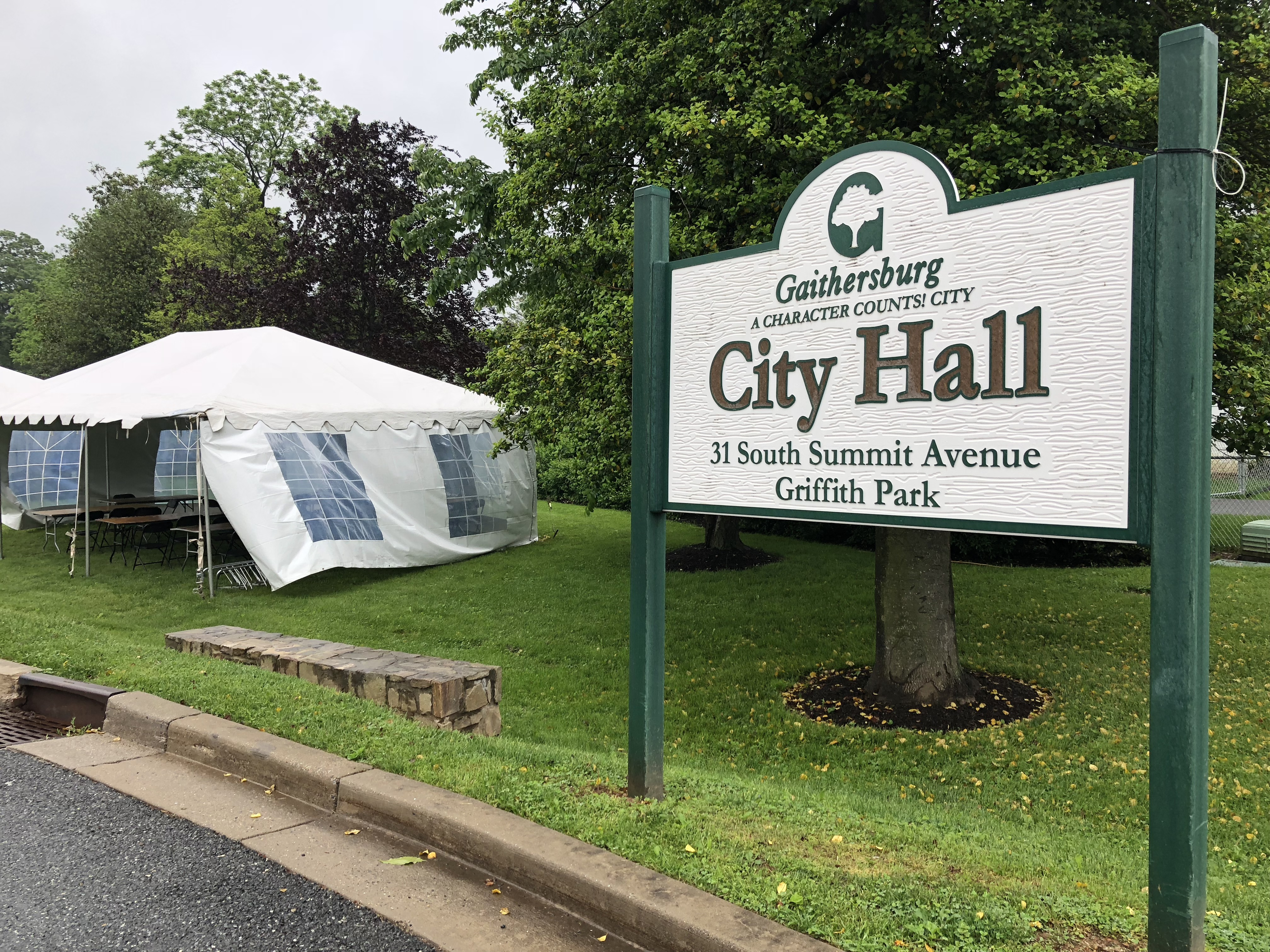
- Industry: Literature and publishing
- Founded: 2010
- Headquarters: Gaithersburg, Maryland, United States of America

The Gaithersburg Book Festival is an annual literary festival held on the third Saturday each May in Gaithersburg, Maryland, United States, which started in 2010. It was conceived of by then City Council member Jud Ashman, who currently serves as Mayor, with the support of then Mayor Sidney Katz and the City Council and the Cultural Arts Advisory Committee. The one day event was held each year between 2010 through 2019 on the grounds of Gaithersburg City Hall. There was a virtual Festival in 2020 when live events were cancelled due to the pandemic. Since 2021, the Festival has been held at the City's Bohrer Park. The Festival is free to attend.

Some noted authors who have presented at the Festival include Alice McDermott, Walter Dean Myers, Kwame Alexander, David Axelrod, Dave Barry, Tayari Jones, Richard Blanco, Judah Friedlander, S. A. Cosby, Jeffery Deaver, Sarah Pekkanen, Jeanine Cummins, Jonathan Eig], Nicholas Kristof, Tim Kurkjian, Laura Lippman, Anthony Marra, Meg Medina, Madeline Miller, Maryland Governor Wes Moore, Linda Sue Park, Eric Ripert, Kennedy Ryan, John Scalzi, Lisa Scottoline and Gene Luen Yang.
