= Freethy =

Freethy is a surname. Notable people with the surname include:

- Albert Freethy (1885–1966), Welsh rugby referee and cricketer
- Barbara Freethy, American fiction author
