= Steal My Heart =

Steal My Heart may refer to:

- Steal My Heart (film), a South Korean film
- Steal My Heart (Barbara Freethy novel), a novel by Barbara Freethy
- "Steal My Heart" (Badfinger song), a song by Badfinger
- "Steal My Heart" (Marit Larsen song), a song by Marit Larsen
