= David Colacci =

American actor

- Education: Southern Methodist University, Augsburg University
- Occupations: Actor, Director, Audiobook Narrator
- Spouse: Susan Ericksen

David Colacci is an actor and audiobook narrator. He is married to audiobook narrator and actress Susan Ericksen.

== Career ==
Colacci is an actor with a background in theater. He studied at Augsburg University in Minnesota and then at Southern Methodist University where he met his future wife, fellow voice actor Susan Ericksen.

=== Audiobook narration ===
Colacci has recorded over 200 audiobooks spanning genres such as mystery and suspense, science fiction and fantasy. His work includes Anne Perry's William Monk series, Donna Leon's Guido Brunetti series and John Lescroart's thrillers, including Hard Evidence, The Motive, and The Suspect which was one of AudioFile's Best Audiobooks of 2007. In addition, he has narrated several books with his wife including L.A. Outlaws by T Jefferson Parker which won an AudioFile Earphones award in 2008 and Carthage by Joyce Carol Oates which won AudioFile's Best Audiobooks in Fiction for 2014.

Other works Colacci has narrated include the following:

- Mark Helprin's A Soldier of the Great War
- Henry Adams's The Education of Henry Adams
- Michael Chabon's Pulitzer Prize-winning The Amazing Adventures of Kavalier & Clay
- John Irving's Son of the Circus

=== Theater ===
In the early part of his career, Colacci performed in many regional theaters across the United States. His acting contributions include the following:

Year	Theater	Role/Contribution	Production
2007	Two River Theater Company	Actor: Saul Kimmer	True West
1982	Actors Theatre of Louisville	Actor: Pianist	Billy Bishop Goes to War
1981	ACT Theatre	Actor: Phil	Loose Ends
1981	ACT Theatre	Actor: Pianist	Billy Bishop Goes to War
1979	ACT Theatre	Actor: Charles Lang	The Water Engine

==== Hope Summer Repertory Theater ====
Colacci is an actor and the artistic director for Hope Summer Repertory Theater (HSRT) at Hope College in Holland, Michigan.

His acting and directing contributions for HSRT include the following:

Year	Role/Contribution	Production
2015	Director	Les Misérables
2014	Director	The Sound of Music
2014	Actor: Horace Vandergelder	The Matchmaker
2013	Director	All Shook Up
2010	Director	Into the Woods
2010	Actor: Michael	I Do, I Do
2008	Actor: Charlie	The Foreigner
2003	Actor: Philip Queeg	The Caine Mutiny Court-Martial

=== Film ===
In addition to theater credits, Colacci has appeared in several independent films over the years including:

Year	Film title	Role
2015	The Sickle	Father Gaudin
2005	The Agent	Senator DeHaan
2004	Some Mournful Bird	Pop

== Personal life ==
Colacci lives in St. Louis Park, Minnesota with his wife (Ericksen) and two children. Their house features a small recording studio where he and Ericksen do the majority of their work.
