= Susan Ericksen =

American actress

- Born: Illinois, U.S.
- Education: Macalester College, St. Paul, MN (BA); Southern Methodist University, Dallas, TX (MFA)
- Occupation: Actress / Audiobook Narrator
- Spouse: David Colacci

Susan Ericksen is an American actress and audiobook narrator.

== Early life and education ==
Born in Illinois, Susan Ericksen earned her Bachelor of Arts at Macalester College in St. Paul, Minnesota, where she began her acting career. Ericksen pursued her Master of Fine Arts in acting at Southern Methodist University in Dallas, Texas, where she met her husband, David Colacci.

== Audiobook narration ==
Ericksen has narrated over 800 audiobook titles, and has said she applies her theatrical experience to her audiobook narration. She has worked with various audiobook producers, including Brilliance Audio, Tantor Media, and BBC Audio. Her notable works include the In Death series by J.D. Robb and the V. I. Warshawski series by Sara Paretsky. In addition, Ericksen is an active member of SAG-AFTRA and contributes to its Audiobook Steering Committee.

=== Accolades and recognition ===
Year	Title	Award	Result	Ref.
2025	Bonded in Death by J.D. Robb	AudioFile Earphones Award	Winner	
2022	Desperation in Death by J.D. Robb	AudioFile Earphones Award	Winner	
2022	Abandoned in Death by J.D. Robb	AudioFile Earphones Award	Winner	
2018	Dark in Death by J.D. Robb	Audie Award for Romance - Best Romance Audiobook	Winner	
2015	The Abundance by Annie Dillard	AudioFile Earphones Award	Winner	
2014	Carthage by Joyce Carol Oates	AudioFile Earphones Award - David Colacci and Susan Ericksen	Winner	
2013	Thankless in Death by J.D. Robb	Audie Award for Romance - Best Romance Audiobook	Winner	
2013	Critical Mass by Sara Paretsky	AudioFile Earphones Award	Winner	
2012	The Nightmare Thief by Meg Gardiner	Audie Award for Thriller or Suspense - Best Thriller/Suspense	Winner	
2012	New York to Dallas by J.D. Robb	Audie Award for Romance - Best Romance Audiobook	Winner	
2012	Celebrity in Death by J.D. Robb	AudioFile Earphones Award	Winner	
2012	New York to Dallas by J.D. Robb	AudioFile Earphones Award	Winner	
2011	Fantasy in Death by J.D. Robb	Audie Award for Romance - Best Romance Audiobook	Finalist	
2010	Body Work by Sara Paretsky	AudioFile Earphones Award	Winner	
2010	Fantasy in Death by J.D. Robb	AudioFile Earphones Award	Winner	
2010	The Liar's Lullaby by Meg Gardiner	AudioFile Earphones Award	Winner	
2009	Almost Astronauts by Tanya Lee Stone	AudioFile Earphones Award	Winner	
2009	Hardball by Sara Paretsky	AudioFile Earphones Award	Winner	
2009	Kindred in Death by J.D. Robb	AudioFile Earphones Award	Winner	
2009	Promises in Death by J.D. Robb	AudioFile Earphones Award	Winner	
2008	Strangers in Death by J.D. Robb	AudioFile Earphones Award	Winner	
2008	L.A. Outlaws by T Jefferson Parker	AudioFile Earphones Award - David Colacci and Susan Ericksen	Winner	
2007	Born in Death by J.D. Robb	Audie Award for Romance - Best Romance Audiobook	Finalist	
2007	Last Known Victim by Erica Spindler	AudioFile Earphones Award	Winner	
2006	Origin in Death by J.D. Robb	AudioFile Audie Award - Best Romance Audiobook	Winner	
2006	Survivor in Death by J.D. Robb	AudioFile Audie Award - Best Romance Audiobook	Finalist	
2006	Survivor in Death by J.D. Robb	AudioFile Earphones Award	Winner	
2004	Naked in Death by J.D. Robb	AudioFile Earphones Award	Winner	
2002	Reunion in Death by J.D. Robb	AudioFile Earphones Award	Winner	
2002	Savannah Blues by Mary Kay Andrews	AudioFile Earphones Award	Winner	

== Stage productions ==
Ericksen's stage career includes performances in regional theaters across the United States, such as The Cleveland Play House, The Repertory Theatre of St. Louis, Cincinnati Playhouse in the Park, and Baltimore Center Stage.

=== Hope Summer Repertory Theater ===
Ericksen has been involved with the Hope Summer Repertory Theater (HSRT) at Hope College in Holland, Michigan, both as an actor and director. Her performances include roles in productions such as A View from the Bridge, Annie and Hay Fever. She has also directed several plays for HSRT.

Ericksen’s acting and directing contributions for HSRT include:

Year	Role/Contribution	Production
2017	Actor: Beatrice Carbone	A View from the Bridge
2017	Actor: Miss Hannigan	Annie
2015	Actor: Judith Bliss	Hay Fever
2014	Actor: Dollie Levi	The Matchmaker
2013	Actor: Margaret Johnson	The Light in the Piazza
2011	Actor: Marta 'Mama' Hanson	I Remember Mama
2010	Actor: Agnes	I Do, I Do
2008	Actor: Sister Aloysius Beauvier	Doubt: A Parable
2005	Actor: Hannah Ferguson	The Spitfire Grill
2003	Director	Once Upon a Mattress
2002	Actor: Sam	Fully Committed
2001	Director	The Wizard of Oz
1999	Director	The Tempest

== Personal life ==
Ericksen resides in St. Louis Park, Minnesota, with her husband David Colacci and their two children. The couple operates a professional recording studio from their home, where they do the majority of their audiobook work.
