= The Snow Fell Three Graves Deep =

2020 novel by Allan Wolf

- Author: Allan Wolf
- Language: English
- Genre: Young adult historical fiction
- Published: Candlewick Press
- ISBN: 9780763663247

The Snow Fell Three Graves Deep: Voices from the Donner Party is a fictional, poetic retelling of the historic Donner Party's expedition into the Sierra Nevada. The book is written by Allan Wolf, published September 8, 2020 by Candlewick Press.

== Reception ==
The Snow Fell Three Graves Deep received starred reviews from BookPage, Booklist, Shelf Awareness, and The Horn Book, as well as the following accolades:

- American Library Association's Best Fiction for Young Adults (2021)
- Kansas NEA Reading Circle Recommended Title (2021)
- Los Angeles Times Book Prize for Young Adult Literature finalist
- Cooperative Children's Book Center Choices Book List
