= New Found Land (Wolf novel) =

2004 novel by Allan Wolf

New Found Land: Lewis and Clark's Voyage of Discovery is a fictional retelling of the expedition of members of the Corps of Discovery, their guide Sacagawea, and Captain Lewis's Newfoundland dog across the United States. The book is written by Allan Wolf, illustrated by Max Grafe, and published August 19, 2004 by Candlewick Press.

== Reception ==
The book received a starred review from Kirkus, Booklist, and the School Library Journal, as well as the following accolades:

- American Library Association's Best Books for Young Adults (2005)
- Booklist's Best Books for Young Adults (2005)
- Outstanding Books for the College Bound and Lifelong Learners (2009)
- New York Public Library Best Books for the Teen Age
- Association of Indiana School Library Educators Read-Aloud Books Too Good to Miss
- International Literacy Association Children's Choice Award
- Lion and the Unicorn Award for Excellence in North American Poetry Honor Book
- School Library Journal Best Book of the Year
