= Hazel Prior =

English Celtic harpist and author

Hazel Prior (born in Oxford, England) is a Celtic harpist and the author of five bestselling novels. Her books have wildlife and environmental themes and are published in over 20 different languages. Her second novel, Away with the Penguins, was a Richard & Judy Book Club pick in 2020, a BBC Radio 2 Book Club pick and a number one bestseller. Prior has lived in many places including Scotland, the Welsh borders, Italy and southwest England. Before turning to writing full time, she held a wide variety of jobs including teaching English as a foreign language and welcoming visitors to a castle. She currently lives on Exmoor.

== Bibliography ==
- 2019 — Ellie and the Harp Maker
- 2020 — Away with the Penguins
- 2021 — Call of the Penguins.
- 2021 – 100 Ways to Write a Book - 100 authors in conversation with Alex Pearl about their backgrounds, motivations and working methods
- 2023 — Life and Otter Miracles
- 2024 - Gone With The Penguins
