= The Magic Strings of Frankie Presto =

2015 novel by Mitch Albom

- First edition
- Author: Mitch Albom
- Language: English
- Publisher: HarperCollins
- Publication date: November 10, 2015
- Publication place: United States
- Media type: Hardcover

The Magic Strings of Frankie Presto is a novel by American author and journalist Mitch Albom. Released on November 10, 2015, publisher HarperCollins printed 700,000 hardcover initial copies. The novel's protagonist, a guitarist, is introduced at his own funeral. Narrated by Music, the novel alternates between Frankie's life and stories told about him by influential people in music during his funeral.

== Plot ==
Franceso "Frankie" Presto was born in Villarreal, Province of Castellón, Spain in August 1936 during the Spanish Civil War in Saint Paschal Church when the church was being raided. To keep him quiet, his mother, Carmencita, sang "Lagrima" by Francisco Tárrega. She died draped in a nun's tunic while the nun present at the time took him in. He was thrown into the Mijares River because he kept crying.

Marcus Belgrave says that Frankie saved a girl's life who had a knife pressed up to her throat by stunning the audience by playing quickly. He swears that one of the strings of Frankie's guitar had turned blue.

After Frankie was thrown in the river, a hairless dog pulls him where he is found by Baffa Rubio, an owner of a sardine factory who raises him as his own. When Frankie turned five, his vision started to get worse as water from the river infected his eyes, so Baffa got him to learn music as he could work without vision. The music school rejects him, and he is instead taught by a blind guitarist called El Maestro. To protect his feelings, Baffa lies about Frankie's mother and instead gives Frankie a picture of his sister. When Frankie is around six, he climbs up a tree and watches the military bury six bodies with a girl named Aurora. He sings to her with his guitar and falls in love. Upon returning home, he finds that his house has been raided and his father missing. El Maestro finds out that Baffa was taken prisoner after some workers say that he was a socialist. Baffa instructs him to send the boy to America with his sister and tells him where to find 600,000 pesetas. El Maestro takes Alberto, a conga player, to retrieve the money. They send Frankie on a boat by bribing sailors after El Maestro gives him his guitar, the six magic strings and lets him perform an American song in public. After the boat leaves, Alberto takes the rest of the money and pushes El Maestro into the ocean. It is revealed that Frankie is the biological son of Elmaestro (Carlos Andres Presto). The magic strings were given to Carmencita by the gypsy, Ceferino Giménez Malla.

Frankie meets Django Reinhardt on a British port after being abandoned by the sailors and plays him Reinhadt's song, "Billets Doux." He then travels with Reinhardt to America to serve as his translator and does so during his tour. One of his six strings turns blue as Django would not have done the tour without Frankie. Frankie meets his aunt who refuses to take him in after he confuses her with his mother and because she had not spoken to Baffa in years. He is then taken into an orphanage where his blue string breaks after he fights with a boy. After a few months, he is reunited with Aurora after traveling to Tennessee where he heard she was and proposes to her. She was the girl he saved when he played. Music describes their love as four symphonies, allegro, adagio, minuet and rondo.

During "adagio," Aurora leaves Frankie as his music career grows. Encouraged by his manager, Frankie marries Delores Ray in late 1964. After they divorce, he gets into drugs although he stops after Aurora returns to him.

At Woodstock, a pregnant Aurora is kicked in the stomach and has a stillborn baby. Frankie was high on drugs and Aurora leaves him. He slashes his left hand.

Tony Bennett recounts that he saw Frankie waiting in a London park everyday for his wife. He mentions Frankie to a BBC presenter and Aurora finds him once again. They move to New Zealand, find an abandoned baby girl and take her in. When recording for the Clever Yells, Frankie composes the songs of his life which are secretly recorded and called the Magic Strings of Frankie Presto.

Frankie travels back to Villareal and learns that Baffa has died but has left him a photo album. He tries to find El Maestro and meets Alberto again who tells him that he killed El Maestro, and Frankie shoots three gunshots. His fifth string turns blue and he abandons his guitar.

Aurora dies after being struck by a beam during a hurricane.

Frankie teaches at a university in the Philippines but returns to Spain when his daughter, Kai, enters a guitar competition. At the grave of Francisco Tarrega he finds his guitar and meets a hooded figure who has been following him since he found Kai. The figure, the nun who threw him into the river, had been following him his whole life and helping him to survive discreetly. She had killed Alberto, and asks Frankie to forgive her which he refuses to do. At Kai's competition he plays, "Lagrima," and forgives the nun, causing the sixth string to turn blue. He dies.
