= Susanna Kearsley =

Canadian writer

- Born: January 17, 1966 (age 60); Brantford, Ontario, Canada
- Occupation: Novelist
- Writing career
- Pen name: Susanna Kearsley; Emma Cole
- Period: 1993–present
- Genres: Historical fiction, romance, mystery, thriller
- Notable work: The Firebird (2013)
- Notable awards: RITA Award – Paranormal Romance; 2014 The Firebird
- Website: susannakearsley.com

Susanna Kearsley (born January 17, 1966) is a New York Times best-selling Canadian novelist of historical fiction and mystery, as well as thrillers under the pen name Emma Cole. In 2014, she received Romance Writers of America's RITA Award for Best Paranormal Romance for The Firebird.

== Biography ==
Kearsley studied politics and international development at university, and has worked as a museum curator. She lives near Toronto, Canada.

== Bibliography ==
=== As Susanna Kearsley ===
- —— (1993). Undertow. Thomas Bouregy & Company. ISBN 9780803489875.
- —— (1994). The Gemini Game. Thomas Bouregy & Company. ISBN 9780803490475.
- —— (1995). Mariana. Bantam. ISBN 9780553573763.
- —— (1996). The Splendour Falls. Bantam Doubleday Dell Publishing Group. ISBN 9780770427184.
- —— (1998). Named of the Dragon. Seal Books. ISBN 9780770427900.
- —— (1999). The Shadowy Horses. Jove. ISBN 9780515124644.
- —— (2001). Season of Storms. Jove. ISBN 9780515131116.
- —— (2011). The Rose Garden. Allison & Busby. ISBN 9780749009519.
- —— (2015). A Desperate Fortune. Sourcebooks. ISBN 9781492602026.
- —— (2018). Bellewether. Simon & Schuster. ISBN 9781501116544.
- —— (2024). The King's Messenger (hardcover ed.). Simon & Schuster UK. ISBN 9781398514362.

==== Slains Trilogy ====
- —— (2008). The Winter Sea. Allison & Busby. ISBN 9780749080976.
- —— (2013). The Firebird. Sourcebooks. ISBN 9781402276637.
- —— (2021). The Vanished Days (hardcover 1st ed.). Sourcebooks. ISBN 9781728249582.

==== Anthologies ====
- —— (2020). The Deadly Hours (paperback ed.). Poisoned Pen Press. ISBN 9781492664444.

=== As Emma Cole ===
- —— (2007). Every Secret Thing. Allison & Busby. ISBN 9780749081478.

== Awards and reception ==
- 2010 – Romantic Times Reviewers' Choice Award for Historical Fiction for The Winter Sea
- 2011 – Romantic Times Reviewers' Choice Award for Historical Fantasy/Paranormal for The Rose Garden
- 2011 – OKRWA National Readers Choice Award for Novel with Romantic Elements for The Rose Garden
- 2013 – Goodreads Choice Nominee for Fantasy for The Firebird
- 2014 – Romance Writers of America RITA Award for Best Paranormal Romance for The Firebird
- 2014 – DABWAHA Romance Tournament for Best Novel With Strong Romantic Elements for The Firebird

Her novel Mariana won the Catherine Cookson Literary Prize. Every Secret Thing was shortlisted for the Crime Writers of Canada's Arthur Ellis Award for Best Novel. Several titles have also been Top Picks at RT Book Reviews. The Huffington Post called The Firebird a "stunning read."

Her 2015 release, A Desperate Fortune, debuted at #8 on the New York Times Bestsellers list in audio format. Other titles to make the New York Times best sellers list include The Rose Garden, The Winter Sea peaking at #5, The Shadowy Horses at #14.
