= Elizabeth Hoyt =

Author of historical romance

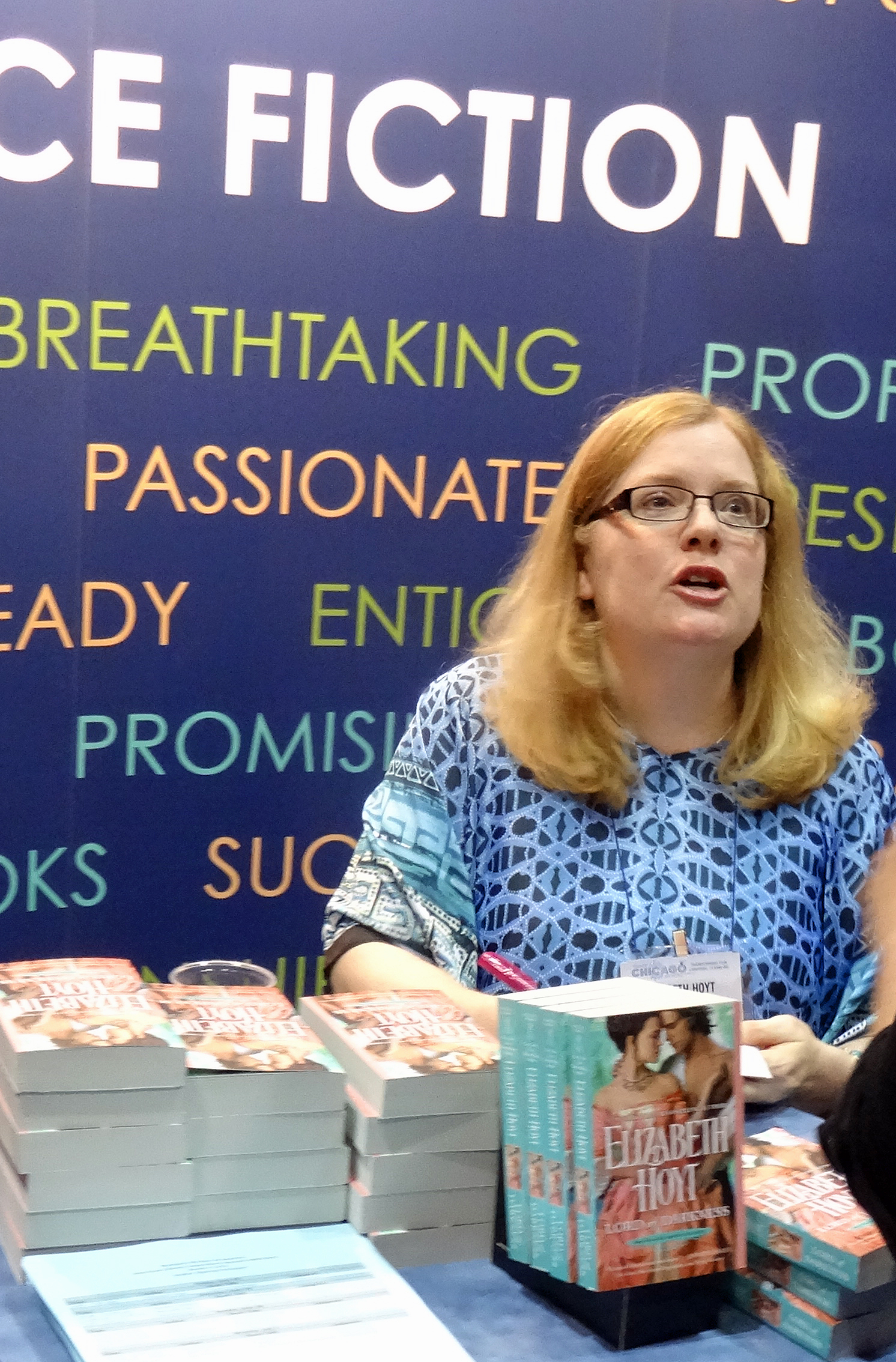
Hoyt signing books in Chicago in June, 2013.

Elizabeth Hoyt is the pen name of Nancy M. Finney. Hoyt is a New York Times bestselling author of historical romance. She also writes contemporary romance under the name Julia Harper. She lives in Minneapolis, Minnesota with her husband and three dogs.

== Bibliography ==
=== The Princes trilogy ===
1. The Raven Prince (November 2006)
2. The Leopard Prince (April 2007)
3. The Serpent Prince (September 2007)
4. The Ice Princess (novella) (August 2010)

=== Legend of Four Soldiers ===
1. To Taste Temptation (May 2008)
2. To Seduce a Sinner (November 2008)
3. To Beguile a Beast (May 2009)
4. To Desire a Devil (November 2009)

=== Maiden Lane series ===
1. Wicked Intentions (August 2010)
2. Notorious Pleasures (February 2011)
3. Scandalous Desires (October 2011)
4. Thief of Shadows (July 2012)
5. Lord of Darkness (February 2013)
6. The Duke of Midnight (October 2013)
7. Darling Beast (Fall 2014)
8. Dearest Rogue (May 2015)
9. Sweetest Scoundrel (November 2015)
10. Duke of Sin (May 2016)
11. The Duke of pleasure (November 2016)
12. The Duke of Desire (October 2017)
13. Once Upon a Moonlit Night (novella) (July 2016)
14. Once Upon a Maiden Lane (novella) (November 2017)
15. Once Upon a Christmas Eve (novella) (December 2017)

=== Greycourt series ===
1. Not the Duke's Darling (December 2018)
2. When a Rogue Meets His Match (December 2020)
3. No Ordinary Duchess (December 2024)

=== As Julia Harper ===
- Hot (January 2008)
- For the Love of Pete (January 2009)

== Sources ==
- Elizabeth Hoyt, New York Times bestselling author
