= Will They Ever Trust Us Again? =

Book by Michael Moore

Will They Ever Trust Us Again? cover

Will They Ever Trust Us Again? is a supplementary book by Michael Moore published after his documentary Fahrenheit 9/11 was in theaters and released on DVD. The film proved to be the most successful documentary of all time, grossing over 120 million dollars in the United States alone. The book's title refers to a line near the end of the movie where Moore questions if the enlisted personnel in the military will ever trust the government again for sending them into a war that was not needed.

Unlike Moore's other books, the contents consist almost completely of letters and e-mail that Moore has received from people in the military and their families, many expressing outrage at George W. Bush for sending them to Iraq, descriptions of the horrors of war, remorse about the killing and destruction wrought on Iraqi civilians, worry about loved ones, and disillusionment with the military and politics. Moore writes in the book's introduction, "What makes these comments unique and so intense is the fact that they are not the words of the Left or the rhetoric of the antiwar movement — they are the war movement."

Moore also provides additional comments and samples from his book on his official website.
