= Molly Harper =

American writer

- Born: Kentucky
- Education: Western Kentucky University (BA) Seton Hill University (Master of Fine Arts)
- Occupation: Novelist
- Writing career
- Genre: Paranormal romance Contemporary romance Mystery
- Notable works: Nice Girls; Naked Werewolf
- Website: mollyharper.com

Molly Harper is an American author of paranormal romance and general romance fiction. She is a member of The Authors Guild and Mystery Writers of America. Harper is best known for her Nice Girls vampire series and Naked Werewolf series.

== Background ==
She graduated in 2000 from Western Kentucky University with a Bachelor of Arts degree in print journalism and began work as a reporter for Paducah Sun. In 2020, she graduated from Seton Hill University with a Master of Fine Arts. She currently lives in Michigan with her husband and two children.

== Work and reception ==
Reception for Harper's work has been positive, with her Naked Werewolf and Nice Girls series both being "Top Picks" for Romantic Times. Her novel And One Last Thing... was a 2011 finalist in the Romance Writers of America's RITA awards in the category of contemporary single title romance.

The Nice Girls series has been praised by Publishers Weekly and USA Today, with Publishers Weekly praising Nice Girls Don't Bite Their Neighbors' "stellar supporting characters, laugh-out-loud moments, and outrageous plot twists". Booklist has also reviewed the Nice Girls series, praising Nice Girls Don't Have Fangs.

And One Last Thing... has received mostly positive reviews from critics, garnering a negative review from Publishers Weekly, while gaining positive reviews from Romantic Times and Booklist.

Harper launched a women's fiction series, the Southern Eclectic series, with Sweet Tea & Sympathy in November 2017. Sweet Tea & Sympathy has received positive reviews from Publishers Weekly and the Romantic Times. The Library Journal stated, “This sweet tale of the city girl finding a home in the country launches Harper’s latest series and will go down as easy as honey on a deep-fried Twinkie.”

In 2024, Harper announced the sale of her first murder mystery to Berkley Prime Crime. A Proposal to Die For was released in April 2025.

Harper has released three series as Audible Exclusives, Mystic Bayou, Moonshadow Cove, and Starfall Point. These series are released as Audible exclusives for at least six months before being available in ebook.

== Bibliography ==
=== Bluegrass ===
- My Bluegrass Baby (2012)
- Rhythm and Bluegrass (2013)
- Snow Falling on Bluegrass (September 22, 2014)

=== Half Moon Hollow ===
- Driving Mr. Dead (2011)
- The Care and Feeding of Stray Vampires (2012)
- A Witch's Handbook of Kisses and Curses (2013)
- Undead Sublet (2013)
- I'm Dreaming of an Undead Christmas (2013)
- The Dangers of Dating a Rebound Vampire (2015)
- The Single Undead Moms Club (2015)
- Fangs for the Memories (2015)
- Where the Wild Things Bite (2016)
- Big Vamp on Campus (2016)
- Accidental Sire (2016)
- Peace, Blood, and Understanding (2019)
- Nice Werewolves Don't Bite Vampires (2020)

=== Jane Jameson/Nice Girls ===
- Nice Girls Don't Have Fangs (2009)
- Nice Girls Don't Date Dead Men (2009)
- Nice Girls Don't Live Forever (2009)
- Nice Girls Don’t Sign a Lease Without a Wedding Ring (2010)
- Nice Girls Don't Bite Their Neighbors (2012)

=== Mystic Bayou ===
- How to Date Your Dragon (2018)
- Love and Other Wild Things (2018)
- Even Tree Nymphs Get the Blues (2019)
- Selkies are a Girl's Best Friend (2019)
- Always Be My Banshee (2020)
- One Fine Fae (2020)
- Shifters in the Night (2021)
- A Farewell to Charms (2021)

=== Moonshadow Cove ===
- The Wrong Witch to Hex With (May 2025)
- Hex Around and Find Out (October 2025)

=== Naked Werewolf ===
- How to Flirt with a Naked Werewolf (2011)
- The Art of Seducing a Naked Werewolf (2011)
- How to Run with a Naked Werewolf (2013)

=== Sorcery and Society ===
- Changeling (2018)
- Fledgling (2019)
- Calling (2022)

=== Southern Eclectic ===
- Save a Truck, Ride a Redneck (2017)
- Sweet Tea and Sympathy (2017)
- Peachy Flippin' Keen (2018)
- Ain't She a Peach (2018)
- A Few Pecans Short of a Pie (2019)
- Gimme Some Sugar (2019)

=== Starfall Point ===
- Witches Get Stuff Done (2022)
- Big Witch Energy (2023)
- Never Been Witched (2024)

=== Standalone titles ===
- And One Last Thing… (2010)
- Better Homes and Hauntings (June 2014)
- Pasties and Poor Decisions (June 2021)
- A Proposal to Die For (April 2025)
