= Kennedy Ryan =

American romance novelist

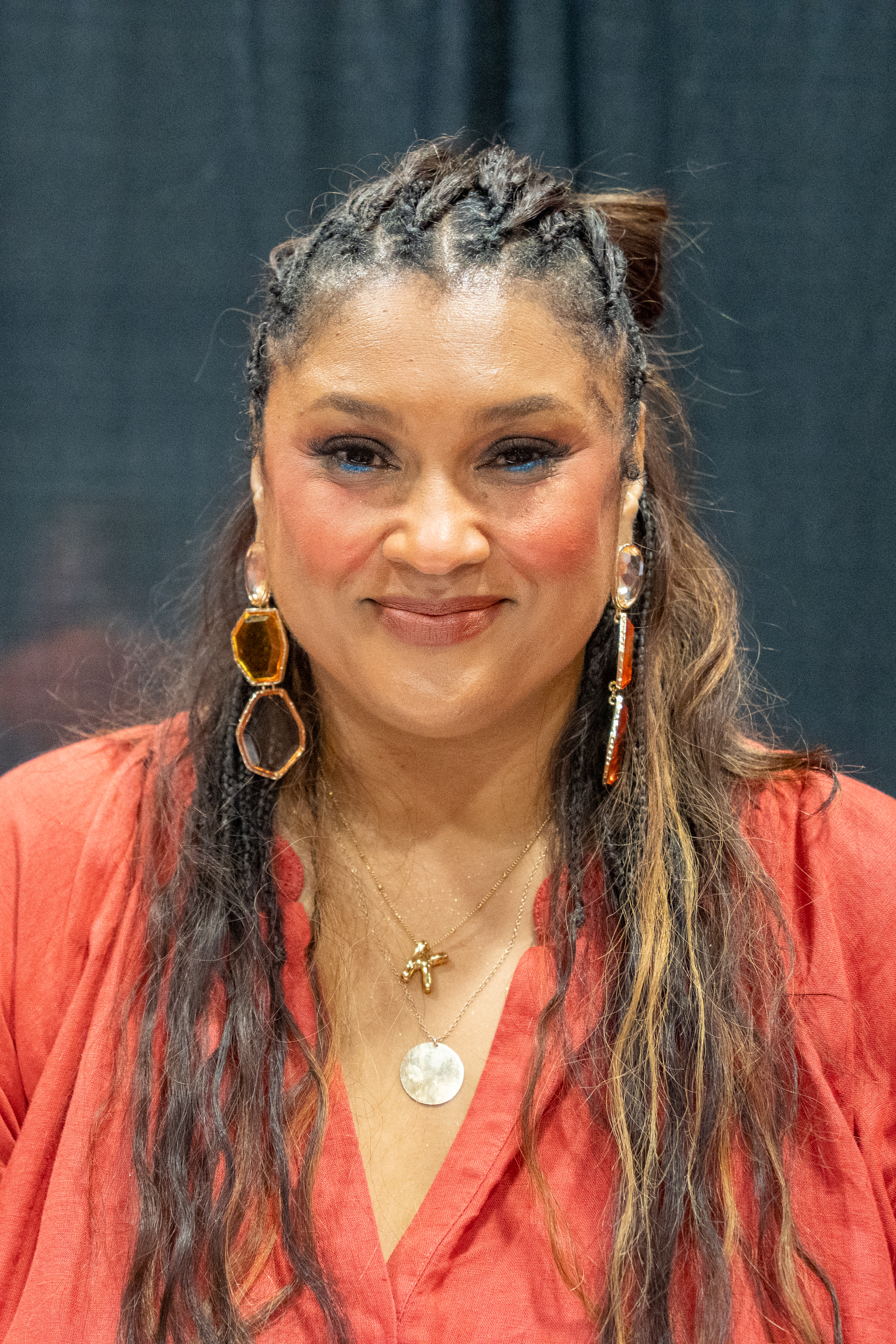
- Education: University of North Carolina at Chapel Hill
- Occupations: Novelist, writer
- Awards: RITA Award (RITA Award for Contemporary Romance: Long, 2019)
- Website: kennedyryanwrites.com

Kennedy Ryan is the pen name of an American romance novelist recognized for her contemporary romance novels highlighting social issues and diverse characters. She is the first Black winner of a RITA Award for romantic fiction and is an activist and founder of a nonprofit for autism awareness.

== Early life and education ==
Ryan wrote for her city's newspaper in her senior year of high school, then studied journalism at the University of North Carolina at Chapel Hill. She worked on writing for non-profit organizations and non-fiction ghost writing before focusing on fiction.

== Career ==
Ryan's writing career focuses on contemporary romance novels noted for their emotional depth and portrayal of social issues. She got her first book deal when she was 40 years old.

Ryan's "Hoops" series explores the lives of professional basketball players with its rights, and for her "All the King's Men" series, being acquired by The Traveling Picture Show Company (TPSC).

In 2019, Ryan was the first Black author to receive the RITA Award by the Romance Writers of America for Best Contemporary Romance for her novel Long Shot, a recognition considered one of the highest honors in the romance writing community. The novel was inspired by the domestic violence incidents around football player Ray Rice.

In 2023, it was reported that her bestselling novel Before I Let Go was in development at Peacock from UCP and Universal Television, with Ryan, Debra Martin Chase, Dominique Telson, John Legend, Malcolm D. Lee, Mike Jackson, and Ty Stiklorius. In September 2026, the streamer greenlit the series, with D. Lee and Ryan adapting the novel, alongside Attica and Tembi Locke who serve as showrunners. D. Lee is also set to direct the series.

== Personal life ==
Ryan is also known for her advocacy work, particularly in raising awareness about autism, inspired by her personal experiences with her son.

== Writing ==
Ryan likes to write stories that aren't the traditional happily ever after, saying "I'm going to write about neurodivergent people. I'm going to write about people with chronic illness. I'm going to write about people who are plus size. I'm going to write about people who may not see themselves in a traditional happily-ever-after but still deserve one."

Interviews are an important part of Ryan's writing process.

She has said Shonda Rhimes was an inspiration for her writing work. Some other authors that Ryan has said inspire her include Tiffanie DeBartolo, Alyssa Cole, L. J. Shen, Nana Malone, Dylan Allen, Emma Scott, Kate Stewart, Amy Harmon, Helen Hoang, Andie Christopher and Talia Hibbert.

== Bibliography ==
=== The Bennetts ===
- When You Are Mine (2014)
- Loving You Always (2014)
- Be Mine Forever (2015)
- Until I'm Yours (2014)

=== Soul ===
- My Soul to Keep (2015)
- Down to My Soul (2016)
- Refrain (2016)

=== Grip ===
- Flow (2017)
- Grip (2017)
- Still (2017)

=== All the King's Men ===
- The Kingmaker (2019)
- The Rebel King (2019)
- Queen Move (2020)

=== Hoops ===
- Long Shot (2018)
- Block Shot (2018)
- Hook Shot (2019)
- Hoops Shorts (2022)

=== Hollywood Renaissance ===
- Reel (2021)
- The Close-Up (2022)
- Score (2026)

=== Skyland ===
- Before I Let Go (2022)
- This Could Be Us (2024)
- Can't Get Enough (2025)

== Awards and reception ==
- 2019 - Romance Writers of America RITA Award, Contemporary Romance: Long – Long Shot
- 2022 - Audio Publishers Association Audie Award for Romance – Reel, narrated by Ebony Flowers, Jakobi Diem, Nicole Small, and April Christina
- 2025 - Audio Publishers Association Audie Award for Romance – This Could Be Us, narrated by Ines del Castillo and Jakobi Diem
- 2026 - NAACP Image Award for Outstanding Literary Work – Fiction Finalist – Can't Get Enough

=== Hoops ===
Long Shot received a starred review from Kirkus Reviews which called it "a triumphant story" and a "sports romance that should be read by everyone who cares about women's safety".

=== Skyland ===
Kirkus Reviews called Before I Let Go a "melodramatic family saga with a side of romance".
