= Maya Banks =

American author

- Maya Banks at the Romance Writers of America Conference in July 2015, New York, NY
- Born: United States
- Occupation: Novelist
- Children: 3
- Writing career
- Pen name: Maya Banks; Sharon Long
- Period: 2006–present
- Genre: Romance
- Website: www.mayabanks.com

Maya Banks is an American bestselling author of erotic romance, romantic suspense, contemporary romance, and Scottish historical romance novels.

== Career ==
Banks has written over fifty novels. Her story, No Place to Run, landed on The New York Times Best Seller list in December 2010, while many others have been ranked on the USA Today's Best-Selling Books list. In September 2012, Berkley Books announced that a trilogy of erotic romance novels by Banks had been acquired for publishing. Her trilogy was described as similar to the Fifty Shades trilogy, featuring three billionaires. In a 2013 interview, Banks stated that she had not read Fifty Shades of Grey, as she usually avoids reading books written in the first person. She added that many readers felt her Sweet series had "ripped Fifty Shades off" despite being published several years prior. In 2013, Banks signed with Avon Books for a three-book deal in the contemporary romance genre featuring "psychic elements".

== Personal life ==
She lives in Texas with her husband and three children. When writing, she prefers absolute quiet and avoids music with lyrics. Of her approach to writing, Banks has said "I approach writing the way I approach reading, because I am a voracious reader, and so I write what I love to read."

== Published works ==
=== Colters' Legacy Series ===
1. Colters' Woman (October 2006)
2. Colters' Wife
3. Callie's Meadow
4. Colters' Lady (May 2011)
5. Colters' Daughter (February 2012)
6. Colters' Promise (June 2012)
7. Colters' Gift (November 2013)

=== The Unbroken Trilogy ===
1. Understood (December 2006)
2. Overheard (January 2007)
3. Undenied (May 2007)
- Unbroken (January 2017) [Collects Understood, Overheard, and Undenied]

=== The Brazen & Reckless Duology ===
1. Brazen (September 2007)
2. Reckless (June 2008)

=== Falcon Mercenary Group Series ===
1. Into the Mist (February 2008)
2. Into the Lair (October 2008)

=== The Sweet Series ===
1. Sweet Surrender (March 2008)
2. Sweet Persuasion (June 2009)
3. Sweet Seduction (October 2009)
4. Sweet Temptation (April 2010)
5. Sweet Possession (March 2011)
6. Sweet Addiction (April 2012)

=== The Anetakis Trilogy ===
1. The Mistress (January 2009) [Originally published as The Tycoon's Pregnant Mistress]
2. The Bride (May 2009) [Originally published as The Tycoon's Rebel Bride]
3. The Affair (July 2009) [Originally published as The Tycoon's Secret Affair]

=== The Wild Series ===
1. Golden Eyes (April 2010)
2. Amber Eyes (May 2009)
- Wild (July 2010) [Collects Golden Eyes and Amber Eyes]

=== The KGI Series ===
1. The Darkest Hour (September 2010)
2. No Place to Run (December 2010)
3. Hidden Away (March 2011)
4. Whispers in the Dark (January 2012)
5. Echoes At Dawn (July 2012)
6. "Softly At Sunrise" (E-book Novella) (August 2012)
7. Shades of Grey (January 2013)
8. Forged in Steele (June 2013)
9. After the Storm (January 2014)
10. When Day Breaks (June 2014)
11. Darkest Before Dawn (October 2015)
12. Brighter Than the Sun (March 2017)
13. Wherever You Are (January, 2022) - never actually published as of April 2026.

=== The McCabe Trilogy ===
1. In Bed with a Highlander (August 2011)
2. Seduction of a Highland Lass (September 2011)
3. Never Love a Highlander (October 2011)

=== The Pregnancy & Passion Series ===
1. Enticed (September 2011) [Originally published as Enticed by His Forgotten Lover]
2. Wanted (November 2011) [Originally published as Wanted by His Lost Love]
3. Tempted (March 2012) [Originally published as Tempted by Her Innocent Kiss]
4. Undone (May 2012) [Originally published as Undone by Her Tender Touch]
- Unforgettable (September 2014) [Collects Enticed and Wanted]
- Undeniable (April 2015) [Collects Tempted and Undone]

=== The Montgomerys & Armstrongs Series ===
1. Never Seduce a Scot (September 2012)
2. Highlander Most Wanted (March 2013)

=== The Breathless Trilogy ===
1. Rush (February 2013)
2. Fever (April 2013)
3. Burn (August 2013)

=== The Tangled Hearts Trilogy ===
1. Theirs to Keep (October 2013)
2. Always Mine
3. Forever Ours

=== The Surrender Trilogy ===
1. Letting Go (February 2014)
2. Giving In (May 2014)
3. Taking It All (August 2014)

=== The Slow Burn Series ===
1. Keep Me Safe (October 2014)
2. In His Keeping (January 2015)
3. Safe At Last (June 2015)
4. With Every Breath (August 2016)
5. Just One Touch (May 2017)
6. His Only Weakness (March 20, 2018)

=== The Enforcers Series ===
1. Mastered (December 2015)
2. Dominated (May 2016)
3. Kept (October 2016)

=== Stand Alone Novels ===
- Seducing Simon (June 2006)
- Love Me, Still (September 2007)
- Long Road Home (November 2007)
- Stay With Me (May 2008)
- Be With Me (November 2008)
- Songbird (September 2009)
- A Contract Engagement (March 2010) [Originally published as Billionaire's Contract Engagement]

=== Novellas ===
- Pillow Talk (October 2010, in Four Play]
- Soul Possession (October 2011, in Men Out of Uniform)
- Exiled (August 2012, in Cherished)
