= Sam's Letters to Jennifer =

2004 novel by James Patterson

- First edition (publ. Little, Brown)
- Author: James Patterson
- Language: English
- Genre: Romance fiction
- Publisher: Little, Brown
- Publication date: 2004
- Publication place: United States
- Pages: 282 (first edition)
- ISBN: 9780316710572

Sam's Letters to Jennifer is a novel written by James Patterson, published in 2004. It was the tenth bestselling fiction hardcover book of 2004 in the United States.

== Plot ==
Jennifer, who is still mourning the death of her husband, is rushed to her grandmother's side when she goes into a coma. Jennifer makes the shocking discovery while there of a packet of letters addressed to her, to read from grandmother, Sam. As Jennifer reads the letters, she follows the sad story of Sam, who married young to a Stanford man, only to find true love soon after with a man nicknamed "Doc". Jennifer is also beginning to find love with a friend from her childhood, Brendan, whom she later finds out is fighting for his life with a brain tumor. As the summer progresses, Sam comes out of her coma and Brendan leaves Jennifer to have a dangerous and possibly life-ending surgery to remove the tumor. Jennifer tracks him down and is there for him when he has, and lives through, the surgery. Brendan gains his health back and "Doc" is revealed to be the family friend Reverend John. At the end of the book, Sam dies, and at her service Jennifer announces that she is pregnant with Brendan's child, who they hope to name Sam. It is later revealed that the child is a daughter.
