= Darkfever =

2006 novel by Karen Marie Moning

- First edition
- Author: Karen Marie Moning
- Cover artist: Franco Accornero
- Language: English
- Series: Fever
- Genre: Urban fantasy Paranormal romance
- Publisher: Delacorte Press
- Publication date: 2006
- Publication place: United States
- Media type: Print (hardcover)
- Pages: 309
- ISBN: 978-0385339155
- Followed by: Bloodfever

Darkfever is the first novel in the Fever series written by #1 New York Times best-selling American author Karen Marie Moning. The book was published in October 2006 by Delacorte Press. The romantic fantasy novel tells the story of the main characters journey into the supernatural world of fairies after she travels across the world to find her sister's murderer. The story is set in Dublin, Ireland and involves Celtic mythology.

== Plot summary ==
The novel tells the story of MacKayla Lane or "Mac", the daughter of Jack and Rainey Lane, who works as a bartender in Georgia. After learning about her sister's death Mac travels to Ireland in hopes of finding her sister's murderer when the local police close the case. Soon after arriving in Ireland, Mac is spending the evening in a local pub when she sees an inhumanly beautiful man. As she stares, her vision starts to change and she sees a man in decay with a foul odor, who she terms the Gray Man, preying on a victim. No one else notices the sight except an elderly woman who startles her by hitting her in the head and telling her not to stare because that jeopardizes them all. The old woman continues to call Mac an O'Connor, which she does not understand. Days later Mac visits a local store by the name of Barrons Books and Baubles where she meets a mysterious man by the name of Jerricho Z. Barrons who informs her of a supernatural world of the Fae and the oncoming and unknown-to-humans war between their world and humankind's. He also teaches Mac that she is a sidhe-seer, as was her sister. Mac comes to believe that her sister was killed by a former Fae, who calls himself the Lord Master, who was using her in his search for the Sinsar Dubh (pronounced shee-sa-du), a Dark Hallow authored by the Dark King of the Unseelie, and which is said to hold all the deadliest magic in its pages.

== Fever glossary ==
Darkfever includes a glossary of twenty three terms that Mac keeps in her journal. The glossary is included to help readers follow along with the terminology included in the book.

1. Tuatha De Danaan or Tuatha Dé – A highly advanced race that came to Earth from another world
2. Seelie – the "light" or "fairer" court of the Tuatha Dé Danaan governed by the Seelie Queen, Aoibheal.
3. Unseelie – the "dark" court of the Tuatha Dé Danaan. According to Tuatha Dé Danaan legend, the Unseelie have been confined for hundreds of thousands of years in an inescapable prison.
4. Sidhe-Seer – a person Fae magic doesn't work on, capable of seeing past the illusions or "glamour" cast by the Fae to the true nature that lies beneath. Some can also see Tabh'rs, hidden portals
5. Null – a sidhe-seer with the power to freeze a Fae with the touch of his or her hands. The higher and more powerful the caste of Fae, the shorter the length of time it stays frozen.
6. Hallow – eight ancient relics of immense power: four light and four dark. The Light Hallows are the stone, the spear, the sword, and the cauldron. The Dark are the mirror, the box, the amulet, and the book (Sinsar Dubh or Dark Book)
7. Sinsar Dubh – a dark hallow belonging to the Tuatha Dé Danaan. Written in a language known only to the most ancient of their kind, it is said to hold the deadliest of all magic within its encrypted pages. Brought to Ireland by the Tuatha Dé during the invasions written of in the pseudo-history Leabhar Gabhala, it was stolen along with the other Dark Hallows, and rumored to have found its way into the world of Man. Allegedly authored over a million years ago by the Dark King of the Unseelie.
8. The Four Stones – translucent blue-black stones covered with raised rune-like lettering. The key to deciphering the ancient language and breaking the code of the Sinsar Dubh is hidden in these four mystical stones. An individual stone can be used to shed light on the small portion of the text, but only if the four are reassembled into one will the true text in its entirety be revealed.
9. OOP (Object of Power) – a Fae relic imbued with mystical properties.
10. Glamour – illusion cast by the Fae to camouflage their true appearance. The more powerful the Fae, the more difficult it is to penetrate its disguise. The average human sees only what the Fae wants them to see, and is subtly repelled from bumping into or brushing against it by a small perimeter of spatial distortion that is part of the Fae glamour.
11. Gray Man – Approximately 9 foot tall, monstrously ugly, leprous Unseelie that feeds by stealing beauty from human women. Can kill but prefers to leave its victim hideously disfigured and alive to suffer.
12. The Many Mouthed Thing – repulsive Unseelie with myriad leech-like mouths, dozens of eyes, and overdeveloped sex organs.
13. Royal Hunters – a mid-level caste of Unseelie. Militantly sentient, they resemble the classic depiction of the devil, with cloven hooves, horns, long satyr-like faces, leathery wings, fiery orange eyes, and tails. Seven to ten feet tall, they are capable of extraordinary speed on both hoof and wing. Their primary function is to exterminate sidhe-seers.
14. Rhino Boys – lower mid-level caste Unseelie thugs dispatch primarily as watchdogs for high-ranking Fae.
15. Shades – one of the lowest caste of the Unseelie. Sentient but barely. They cannot bear direct light and hunt only at night. They steal life in the manner the Gray Man steals beauty, draining their victims with vampiric swiftness, leaving behind a pile of clothing and a husk of dehydrated human matter.
16. Dark Zone – an area that has been taken over by the Shades. During the day it looks like your everyday abandoned, rundown neighborhood. Once night falls, it's a death trap.
17. Pri-Ya – a human addicted to Fae sex.
18. Sifting – Fae method of transportation. Occurs at the speed of thought.
19. Sifting Silvers – an elaborate maze of mirrors once used as the primary method of Fae travel between realms, until Cruce cast the forbidden curse into the silvered corridors. Now no Fae dares enter the Silvers.
20. Spear of Luisne – a.k.a. Spear of Luin, Holy Lance, Spear of Longuins, Spear of Destiny, and the Flaming Spear. The spear used to pierce Jesus Christ's right side at his crucifixion. Not of human origin; it is a Tuatha Dé Danaan Light Hallow, and one of the few items capable of killing a Fae-regardless of rank or power.
21. Tabh'rs – Fae doorways or portals between realms, often hidden in everyday human objects.
22. Cuff of Cruce – A gold arm cuff; It was made long ago for one of his prized human concubines. It permits a shield of sorts against many Unseelie.
23. The Compact – The treaty governing cohabitation of the races (Fae and Man). The terms of the Compact are secret from all mortals but the MacKeltar, a highland clan of ancient bloodline descended from the Druids, and sole keepers of Man's end of the treaty.

== Publication and reception ==
Darkfever was published by Delacorte Press in November 2006 in the United States and in the United Kingdom on September 8, 2011 by Orion Publishing Group.

Publishers Weekly review stated that Darkfever was a "A compelling world filled with mystery and vivid character...will stoke readers’ fervor for Bloodfever, the next installment." Nina Davis of Booklist wrote "Time-travel-travel romance maven Moning reshapes her Celtic lore for a radically different and engaging new dark fantasy series." John Charles from the Chicago Tribune says "Suffused with a seductive mix of Celtic mythology and dark, sexy danger, Darkfever is the first in a beguiling new paranormal romance series." Fellow Fantasy writer Charlaine Harris said the novel was "A wonderful dark fantasy…give yourself a treat and read outside the box."

== Film adaptation ==
DreamWorks acquired rights in August 2011 to make a film adaption of Darkfever; Touchstone Pictures was to distribute the film. However, in August, 2013, Moning announced on her Facebook Page that she had bought the rights back. There has been no further news regarding the movie.

== Sequels ==
The Fever Series continues with eight more books, so far:

- Bloodfever (August 2008)
- Faefever (July 2009)
- Dreamfever (October 2010)
- Shadowfever (January 2011)
- Fever Moon, a graphic novel (October 2012)
- Iced, a Dani O'Malley novel (October 2012)
- Burned (January 2015)
- Feverborn (January 2016)
- Feversong (January 2017)
- High Voltage (March 2018)
- Kingdom of Shadow and Light (Feb 2021)
