= Andi Arndt =

American audiobook narrator

- Education: James Madison University
- Occupation: Audiobook narrator

Andi Arndt is an American audiobook narrator. She is in the Audible Narrator Hall of Fame and has won two Audie Awards and three Voice Arts Awards.

Arndt is a classically-trained actress and has studied Spanish, Dutch, Italian, French, and Mandarin Chinese. She began her career hosting public radio programs, as well as teaching acting and voice/speech at James Madison University. In 2014, Arndt founded Lyric Audiobooks, an audiobook production company.

She lives in Michigan with her husband and their two daughters.

== Awards and honors ==
In 2015, AudioFile included Arndt's narration of Broken Juliet in their list of the best romantic fiction narrations of the year.

In 2018, she was inducted into Audible's Narrator Hall of Fame.

Year	Title	Author	Award	Result	Ref.
2014	Nine Inches	Tom Perrotta	Audie Award for Short Stories or Collections	Finalist	
2015	The Good Girl	Mary Kubica	Voice Arts Award for Best Voiceover in Audiobook Narration: Crime & Thriller	Finalist	
2016	Beneath These Lies	Meghan March	Voice Arts Award for Best Voiceover in Audiobook Narration: Romance	Finalist	
2016	Slip of the Tongue	Jessica Hawkins	Voice Arts Award for Best Voiceover in Audiobook Narration: Romance	Finalist	
2017	Dirty (1945)	Kylie Scott	Audie Award for Romance	Winner	
2017	The Hot One	Lauren Blakely	Voice Arts Award for Best Voiceover in Audiobook Narration: Romance	Winner	
2017	Take Me Back	Meghan March	Voice Arts Award for Best Voiceover in Audiobook Narration: Romance	Finalist	
2018	Cake: A Love Story (2016)	J. Bengtsson	Audie Award for Romance	Finalist	
2018	Come As You Are	Lauren Blakely	Voice Arts Award for Best Voiceover in Audiobook Narration: Romance or Erotica	Finalist	
2019	Birthday Suit	Tyler Whitlatch	Voice Arts Award for Best Sound Design in Audio Engineering	Finalist	
2019	A Bound Heart	Aimee Lilly	Voice Arts Award for Best Voiceover in Audiobook Narration: Romance or Erotica	Finalist	
2019	Wrong Turn	Tanya Eby (editor)	Voice Arts Award for Best Voiceover in Audiobook Narration: Short Story Anthology	Winner	
2020	Birthday Suit	Tyler Whitlatch	Audie Award for Audio Drama	Finalist	
2020	Bitter Legacy	Gary Furlong	Voice Arts Award for Best Voiceover in Audiobook Narration: Romance or Erotica	Finalist	
2020	Instant Gratification	Tyler Whitlatch	Voice Arts Award for Best Sound Design in Audio Engineering	Winner	
2020	Instant Gratification	Tyler Whitlatch	Voice Arts Award for Best Voiceover in Audiobook Narration: Humor	Finalist	
2020	Satisfaction Guaranteed	Tyler Whitlatch	Voice Arts Award for Best Sound Design in Audio Engineering	Finalist	
2020	The Yes Factor	Erin Spencer and Emma Sable	Voice Arts Award for Best Voiceover in Audiobook Narration: Romance or Erotica	Finalist	
2021	Dirty Letters (2021)	Vi Keeland and Penelope Ward	Audie Award for Romance	Winner	
2021	Florida Man	R. C. Bray	Voice Arts Award for Best Voiceover in Audiobook Narration: Humor	Finalist	
2022	Pause	Kylie Scott	Audie Award for Romance	Finalist	
