= Barbara Freethy =

American author

- Education: University of California, Santa Barbara
- Occupation: Novelist
- Writing career
- Period: 1996–present
- Genres: contemporary romance, romantic suspense, women's fiction
- Notable works: Daniel's Gift, The Way Back Home
- Notable awards: RITA award – Best Contemporary Single Title; 1997 Daniel's Gift; RITA award – Best Contemporary Single Title; 2013 The Way Back Home
- Website: barbarafreethy.com

Barbara Freethy (born in California) is a #1 New York Times bestselling American author of women's fiction, contemporary romance and romantic suspense. She is a two-time winner of Romance Writers of America's RITA Award. She has sold over 5 million books, with 18 books making the New York Times bestseller list. In 2014, she was named the Amazon KDP Bestselling Author of All Time.

== Biography ==
Freethy is a native of California and earned a degree in Communications from UC Santa Barbara. She worked for a while in public relations before launching her writing career with novels published by Silhouette Romance, Harper Collins, Penguin and Simon and Schuster. In 2011, she started self-publishing by releasing backlist titles, and then new works. In 2012, she hit #1 on the New York Times Bestseller List with Summer Secrets. She attributes her success to building a consistent brand, as well as releasing multiple books—backlist and new—a year. In an article in The Economist, a columnist visited a booth of eight self-published authors which included Freethy and Bella Andre and reported that traditional publishers were skeptical of their claim that between them they'd sold 16 million books. Freethy was quoted as saying, "No one is counting our books in any survey that comes out in the media."

In 2014, Amazon's Kindle Worlds added Freethy's "The Callaway" series as one of four new offerings.

== Bibliography ==
=== Angel's Bay ===
1. Suddenly One Summer. July 2009 [2009].
2. On Shadow Beach. April 2010 [2010].
3. In Shelter Cove. May 2010 [2010].
4. At Hidden Falls. January 2011 [2011].
5. Garden of Secrets. September 2011 [2011].

=== Bachelors & Bridesmaids ===
1. Kiss Me Forever. November 2014 [2014].
2. Steal My Heart. December 2014 [2014].
3. All Your Loving. December 2014 [2014].
4. Before I Do. March 2015 [2015].

=== The Callaways ===
1. On A Night Like This. December 2012 [2012].
2. So This Is Love. April 2013 [2013].
3. Falling For A Stranger. July 2013 [2013].
4. Between Now And Forever. October 2013 [2013].
4.5 Nobody But You. December 2013 [2013].
5. All A Heart Needs. February 2014 [2014].
6. That Summer Night. June 2014 [2014].
7. When Shadows Fall. September 2014 [2014].
8. Somewhere Only We Know. February 2015 [2015].

=== Deception ===
1. Taken. June 2006 [2006].
2. Played. October 2006 [2006].

=== Sanders Brothers ===
1. Silent Run. March 2008 [2008].
2. Silent Fall. April 2008 [2008].

=== Wish ===
1. A Secret Wish. December 2011 [2011].
2. Just A Wish Away. April 2012 [2012].
3. When Wishes Collide. September 2012 [2012].

=== Stand-alone novels ===
- Daniel's Gift. March 1996 [1996].
- Ryan's Return. October 1996 [1996].
- Ask Mariah. May 1997 [1997].
- One True Love. August 1998 [1998].
- The Sweetest Thing. April 1999 [1999].
- Almost Home. January 2000 [2000].
- Just The Way You Are. November 2000 [2000].
- All She Ever Wanted. 2000.
- Some Kind of Wonderful. January 2001 [2001].
- Love Will Find A Way. March 2002 [2002].
- Summer Secrets. May 2003 [2003].
- Golden Lies. February 2004 [2004].
- Don't Say A Word. January 2005 [2005].
- The Way Back Home. May 2012 [2012].

== Awards and reception ==
Awards for Barbara Freethy
Year	Nominated work	Category	Award	Result	Notes	Ref.
1996	Ryan's Return	Contemporary Novel	Romantic Times Reviewers' Choice Award	Won		
1997	Daniel’s Gift	Contemporary Single Title	Romance Writers of America RITA Award	Won		
2013	The Way Back Home	Contemporary Single Title Romance	Romance Writers of America RITA Award	Won		
