= Dick Hill (narrator) =

American audiobook narrator

Dick Hill (November 2, 1946 – October 4, 2022) was an American audiobook narrator who narrated over 1,000 audiobooks — including Harry Bosch and Jack Reacher series — and won three Audie Awards. He was the recipient of a Golden Voices award from AudioFile magazine. He worked with his wife, Susie Breck, who is also an audiobook narrator and director.

Prior to his career as an actor, Hill served as a Marine in Vietnam.

Hill died on October 4, 2022 after opting to forgo an aggressive form of chemotherapy, a decision he shared publicly.
