= Bella Andre =

American author

- Born: Rochester, New York, U.S.
- Education: Stanford University
- Occupation: Novelist
- Writing career
- Period: 2003–present
- Genre: Romance

Bella Andre (born in New York) is an American author of more than 40 contemporary romance novels. As of 2019, Andre is the New York Times, USA Today, and Wall Street Journal bestselling author of The Sullivans™ series and her books have sold over 8 million copies. She also writes as Lucy Kevin for the Four Weddings and a Fiasco series and the Married in Malibu series.

== Biography ==
Bella Andre was born in Rochester, New York. When she was four years old, her family moved to Northern California. Her mother was an avid reader and her father an author of non-fiction books in the field of economics. She studied economics from Stanford University.

After graduating from Stanford, Andre read The Artist's Way by Julia Cameron. While practicing the "morning pages ritual" described in the book, which encourages authors to begin their day by writing three pages, Andre began "having two characters speak to one another in my head." The dialogue, according to Andre, continued relentlessly until she had to put the rest of it in writing, leading to her first finished novel, Authors in Ecstasy. Over the next year, Andre had several other books published by Ellora's Cave, a publisher based in Akron, Ohio.

Her fifth novel, Take Me, was published by Simon & Schuster in 2005 and was among the first in the genre to feature a plus-sized heroine. Andre went on to publish additional four novels with Simon & Schuster. Later that same year, Andre shifted her focus to writing in a new genre, that of romantic suspense. In the subsequent year she published her first novel in this genre, Wild Heat with Random House.

In 2007, Publishers Weekly described Andre writing as "empowered stories enveloped in heady romance".

In 2010 Andre published two novels with Hachette Book Group.

Though being published with major publishers, Andre was constantly displeased with subjects such as the cover design and overall lack of reader-experience.

According to Andre, dissatisfaction she had with the major publishers, Simon & Schuster, Random House and Hachette pushed her to experiment with independent publishing.

=== Kindle phenomenon ===
In March 2010, after receiving her rights back from the publisher for her novel Authors in Ecstasy, Andre independently published the book through Amazon's relatively new Kindle program as Take Me. In July 2010 Andre went ahead and published Love Me, the sequel to Take Me, which was first published by Simon & Schuster.

When publishing Love Me, Andre faced the Amazon author portal, which was a fairly new platform for authors to use, and she had to teach herself how to format an ebook, which was a novelty at the time and had no online instructions. Additionally, she taught herself Photoshop in order to design the cover of the book.

As part of the publicity for the novel, Andre wrote personal emails to every single reader who had ever contacted her during the previous five years, amounting to hundreds of personal emails.

The two books sold relatively well on Amazon and, being encouraged by the public response, Andre went on to publish the sequel to another book previously published by Simon & Schuster, naming the sequel Game for Love.

=== Game for Love ===
Game for Love, published in December 2010, was simultaneously distributed in Amazon's Kindle, as well as the relatively new Barnes & Noble Nook, which was launched a month prior. Within five weeks, Game for Love appeared on the top 25 on the Barnes & Noble digital charts.

Subsequently, Andre was featured in the Washington Post. The article legitimized independently published authors, naming Andre a digital pioneer and "one of the hottest digital writers in America." Within the literary community, however, Andre's success was perceived as little more than vanity press.

Following the unexpected response to Game For Love, Andre proceeded to publish books that major publishers had previously rejected. Since these books were aimed at a different readership, Andre published them under the nom de plume Lucy Kevin.

=== The Sullivans™ series ===
The relative success of the subsequent four novels published as Lucy Kevin led Andre to contemplate venturing into a genre which she knew, from her experience, traditional publishers would have found too risky—publishing an eight-book series focusing entirely on one family. Previously her editor at a traditional publishing house told her such a romance series would never sell.

Having the freedom of not having to adhere to the rules of the publishing industry, Andre decided to write a series she wanted to read with characters who are "not fictional characters. They're real people." She also wanted the couples to be from big families. She drew her inspiration from author Julia Quinn's Bridgertons series, which focused on a family set in Regency England.

The first book in the Sullivans™ series was called The Look of Love. Andre went on to complete the entire eight-book series that she initially intended to write, and then branched off to the larger, extended Sullivan family. Today, her Sullivans™ series comprises more than 20 books.

In 2013 Andre had five books from The Sullivans™ series appear simultaneously on The New York Times and USA Today bestseller lists.

=== The Harlequin print contract ===
In July 2013, following the appearance of five of Andre's titles on The New York Times and USA Today bestsellers lists simultaneously, Andre was approached by multiple traditional New-York based publishers offering to acquire the rights for The Sullivans™ series. Due to her previous experience with traditional publishers, Andre was adamant on retaining the rights for the digital distribution of her novels, as well as the rights for foreign translations. She was willing to negotiate terms on print publication in English alone, which subsequently led to negotiations with several publishers.

In September 2013 Andre went on to sign an agreement with Harlequin MIRA, granting the rights for print of her first eight novels in the Sullivans™ series. The deal, which allegedly was of seven figures, was covered in Time magazine. The 2013 deal was the first of its kind; granting a publisher print-rights to release paperback in the US, Canada, and Australia, while the author retained digital rights and foreign publication rights. Coincidentally, ten years earlier, Andre was rejected by Harlequin.

=== Additional publishing ===
Andre's books have been translated into multiple languages including French, German, Thai, Japanese and Ukrainian.

In 2014, Andre signed an agreement with Kobo, giving them exclusive rights to the French translations to the five-volume series, Four Weddings and a Fiasco series written as Lucy Kevin for a three-month period.

Also in 2014, Amazon launched four new series in its Kindle Worlds program including Andre's Game for Love series and Kevin's Four Weddings and a Fiasco series.

== Personal life ==
Bella Andre and her family split their time between Northern California, the Adirondacks, and London.

== Bibliography ==
=== As Bella Andre ===
The Sullivans™

- The San Francisco Sullivans™
  1. The Look Of Love 2013, ISBN 9780778315568
  2. From This Moment On 2012, ISBN 9780778315575
  3. Can't Help Falling In Love 2011, ISBN 0983720290
  4. I Only Have Eyes For You 2013, ISBN 0778315592
  5. If You Were Mine 2013, ISBN 0778315606
  6. Let Me Be The One 2013, ISBN 0778316009
  7. Come A Little Bit Closer 2014, ISBN 0778316084
  8. Always On My Mind 2014, ISBN 0778316173
  9. Kissing Under The Mistletoe 2014, ISBN 0778317013
- The Seattle Sullivans™
  1. One Perfect Night 2014, ASIN: B00AXTM8G2
  2. The Way You Look Tonight 2014, ISBN 9780778317302
  3. It Must Be Your Love 2015, ISBN 0778317315
  4. Just To Be With You 2015, ISBN 1938127552
  5. I Love How You Love Me 2015, ISBN 1938127560
  6. All I Ever Need Is You 2015, ISBN 1938127951
- The New York Sullivans™
  1. Every Beat Of My Heart 2016, ISBN 1945253177
  2. Now That I've Found You 2016, ISBN 1945253002
  3. Since I Fell For You 2016, ISBN 1945253118
  4. Sweeter Than Ever 2017, ISBN 1945253231
  5. The Best Is Yet To Come 2017, ISBN 1945253290
  6. Can't Take My Eyes Off Of You 2017, ISBN 1945253304
  7. You Do Something To Me 2017, ISBN 1945253355
  8. Every Time We Fall In Love 2018, ISBN 1945253746
- The Maine Sullivans™
  1. Falling In Love All Over Again 2018, ISBN 1945253738
  2. Your Love is Mine 2019, ISBN 1945253886
  3. There Goes My Heart 2019, ISBN 1945253983
  4. When You Kiss Me 2020, ISBN 1950351289
  5. Hold On To My Heart 2021, ISBN 1950351726

The London Sullivans™

1. As Long As I Have You 2019, ISBN 1950351726

=== As Lucy Kevin ===
Four Weddings & A Fiasco

1. The Wedding Gift 2012, ASIN: B007BVNF4O
2. The Wedding Dance 2012, ASIN: B00822WKBA
3. The Wedding Song 2012, ASIN: B008O4LHA6
4. The Wedding Dress 2012, ASIN: B009RRNRXO
5. The Wedding Kiss 2012, ASIN: B00AQOY5RO

Married in Malibu

1. The Beach Wedding 2016, ASIN: B01AZYK56E
2. The Summer Wedding 2017, ASIN: B01MSJLC0H
3. The Barefoot Wedding 2018, ASIN: B07FCTJP24
4. The Moonlight Wedding 2019, ASIN: B07JL8PCBC

The Walker Island Series

1. Be My Love 2015, ISBN 1938127579
2. No Other Love 2015, ISBN 1938127587
3. When It's Love 2015, ISBN 1938127617
4. All For Love 2015, ISBN 1938127625
5. Forever In Love 2015, ISBN 1938127676

Lucy Kevin stand-alones

- Falling Fast 2018, ASIN: B07L7ZJNCP
- Sparks Fly 2018, ASIN: B07L7ZQPPC
