= Garrett M. Graff =

American journalist and author (born 1981)

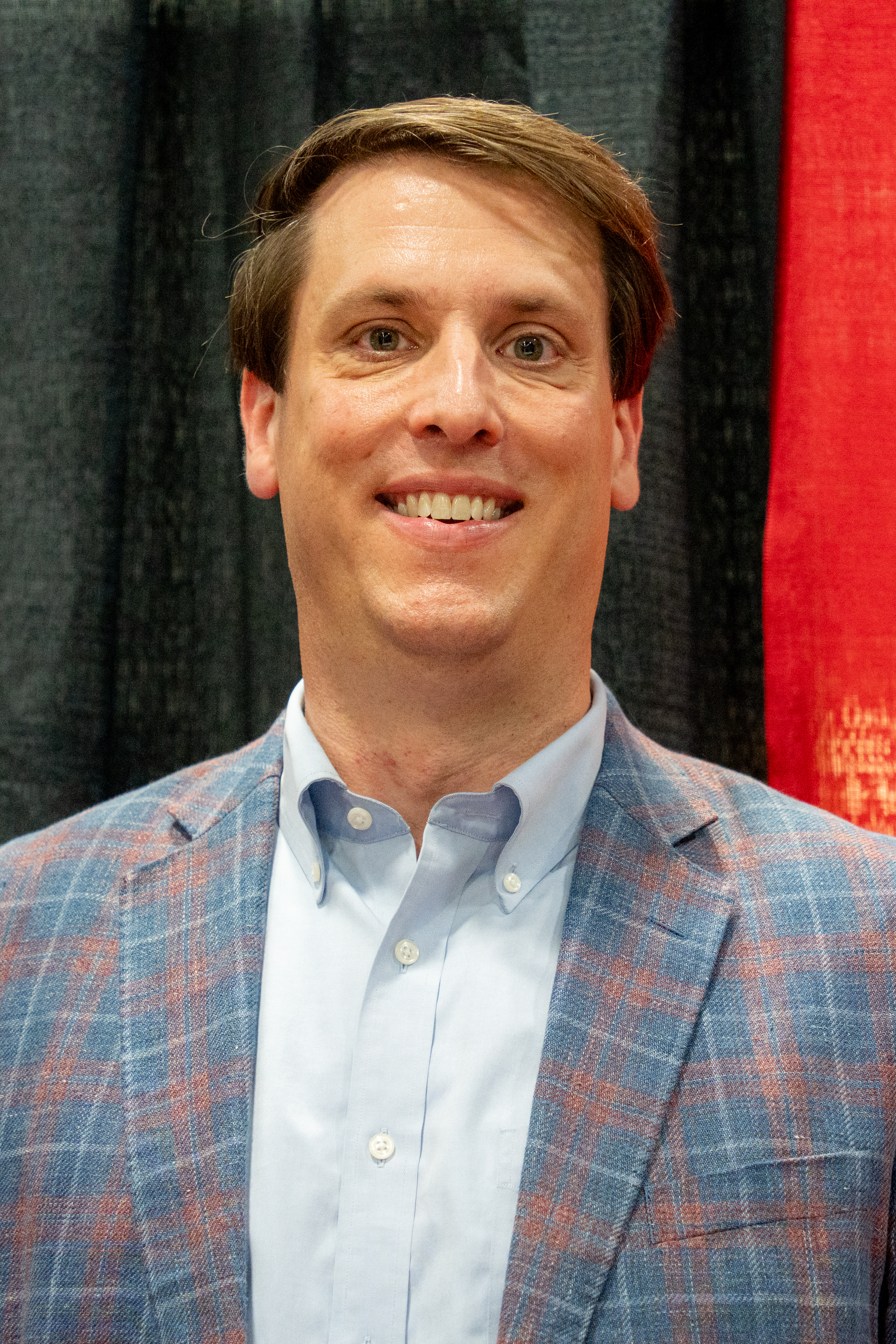
- Graff at the National Book Festival 2025
- Born: 1981 (age 44–45)
- Education: Harvard University
- Occupation: Journalist
- Spouse: Katherine Frances Birrow (m. 2013)

Garrett M. Graff (born 1981) is an American journalist and author. He is a former editor of Politico Magazine, editor-in-chief of Washingtonian magazine in Washington, D.C., and instructor at Georgetown University in the Master's in Professional Studies Journalism and Public Relations program.

== Life ==
Graff was born in 1981 and raised in Montpelier, Vermont. As an undergraduate at Harvard College, Graff was an editor of The Harvard Crimson. He also held internships at ABC News' Political Unit and Atlantic Monthly. He served as deputy national press secretary on Howard Dean's presidential campaign and helped create and maintain Dean's website.

He later took a job as the Vice President of Communications at EchoDitto, Inc. a Washington, D.C.–based technology consulting firm. Graff also ran FishbowlDC for the blog Mediabistro. In 2005, he became the first blogger to receive credentials to cover the White House. Graff serves on the board of the Burlington Housing Authority.

Graff and Katherine Frances Birrow were married in Barnard, Vermont, in 2013.

== Works ==
- Angel Is Airborne: JFK's Final Flight from Dallas. 2003. ISBN 9781940914008. Ebook.
- The First Campaign: Globalization, the Web, and the Race for the White House. Farrar, Straus, and Giroux. 2007. ISBN 9780374155032. OCLC 474017210.
- The Threat Matrix: Inside Robert Mueller's FBI and the War on Global Terror. New York: Little, Brown and Company. 2011. ISBN 9780316068611. OCLC 696603476.
- Raven Rock: The Story of the U.S. Government's Secret Plan to Save Itself—While the Rest of Us Die. Simon & Schuster. 2017. ISBN 9781508237877. OCLC 980878943. About Raven Rock Mountain Complex.
- Carlin, John P.; Graff, Garrett M. (2018). Dawn of the Code War: America's Battle Against Russia, China, and the Rising Global Cyber Threat (First ed.). New York: PublicAffairs. ISBN 978-1541773837. OCLC 1041249829.
- The Only Plane in the Sky: An Oral History of 9/11. Avid Reader Press. 2019. ISBN 978-1-5011-8220-4.
- Watergate: A New History. Avid Reader Press/Simon & Schuster. 2022. ISBN 9781982139162.
  - Review: Brinkley, Douglas (February 15, 2022). "Watergate: The Scandal That Never Goes Away". The New York Times.
- UFO: The Inside Story of the US Government's Search for Alien Life Here―and Out There. Avid Reader Press/Simon & Schuster. 2023. ISBN 9781982196776. OCLC 1407420009.
- When the Sea Came Alive: An Oral History of D-Day. Avid Reader Press/Simon & Schuster. 2024. ISBN 9781668027813. OCLC 1435618786.
- Life Became Very Blurry: An Oral History of COVID-19 in Vermont. Vermont Historical Society. 2025. ISBN 9780934720823.
- The Devil Reached Toward the Sky: An Oral History of the Making and Unleashing of the Atomic Bomb. Avid Reader Press/Simon & Schuster. 2025. ISBN 9781668092392. OCLC 1512661380.
- America in 25 Revolutions: The Story of Our Imperfect Nation's 250-Year Quest to Become a More Perfect Union. Avid Reader Press/Simon & Schuster. 2026. ISBN 9781668247525.
