= Allan Wolf =

American author

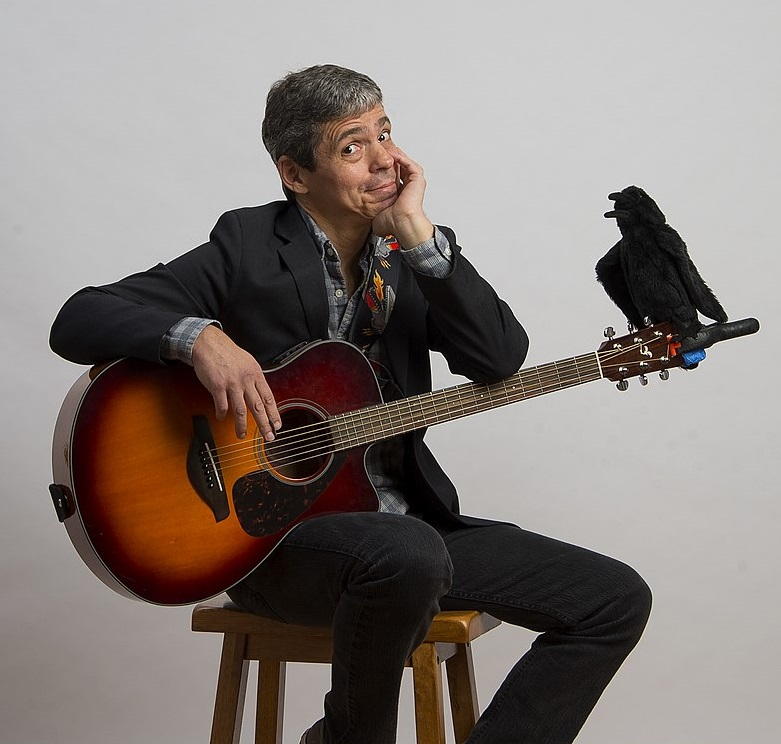
- Born: United States
- Education: Virginia Tech (MA)
- Children: 3
- Writing career
- Genres: Young adult fiction, poetry
- Notable works: The Snow Fell Three Graves Deep; The Watch That Ends the Night; New Found Land
- Website: www.allanwolf.com

Allan Wolf is an American poet and young adult author. His books are primarily multi-perspective historical fiction in verse, but he has also published several poetry books for children. He is also an accomplished slam poet.

== Personal life ==
Wolf received a Master of Arts degree in English from Virginia Tech. After graduation, he taught at the university for three years before moving to North Carolina, where he became the artistic and educational director of the touring group Poetry Alive!

Wolf founded the Southern Fried Poetry Slam in 1993, hosted the National Poetry Slam in 1994, and formed the National Championship Team in 1995. He has hundreds of poems memorized and continues to travel and perform.

He currently lives in Asheville, North Carolina, with his wife and three children.

== Selected texts ==
=== New Found Land (2004) ===
New Found Land: Lewis and Clark's Voyage of Discovery, illustrated by Max Grafe, was published August 19, 2004 by Candlewick Press. The book received the following accolades, among others:

- American Library Association's Best Books for Young Adults (2005)
- Booklist's Best Books for Young Adults (2005)
- Outstanding Books for the College Bound and Lifelong Learners (2009)
- School Library Journal Best Book of the Year

=== Zane's Trace (2007) ===
Zane's Trace was published August 28, 2007 by Candlewick Press. The book received the following accolades:

- Book Sense Children's Pick Top Ten
- North Carolina School Library Media Association Young Adult Book Award (2009)

=== The Watch That Ends the Night (2011) ===
The Watch That Ends the Night: Voices from the Titanic was published October 11, 2011 by Candlewick Press. It is a young adult historical fiction novel written entirely in verse that tells the story of the Titanic. It is told in the voices of two dozen characters, including "the Unsinkable" Molly Brown, a ship rat, and the iceberg. When writing the book, Wolf created a secondary cast composed entirely of ship rats, but cut the narrative mostly out of the final draft at the request of his editor.

The book received following accolades, among others:

- Booklist Editors' Choice: Books for Youth (2011)
- American Library Association's (ALA) Best Fiction for Young Adults (2012)
- Bank Street College Claudia Lewis Award for Older Readers (2012)
- ALA's Amazing Audiobooks for Young Adults Top Ten (2013)
- Booklist's 50 Best YA Books of All Time
- Young Adult Library Services Association's Outstanding Books for the College Bound

=== Who Killed Christopher Goodman? (2017) ===
Who Killed Christopher Goodman? was published March 14, 2017 by Candlewick Press. The book tells the story of a teenager who is murdered, and was based on the real-life murder of Wolf's childhood friend, Ed Disney.

The book received starred reviews from Booklist and the School Library Journal, as well as the following accolades:

- American Library Association's Amazing Audiobooks for Young Adults (2018)
- Booklist Editors' Choice: Books for Youth Top of the List (2017)
- Booklist's Top 10 Historical Fiction Books for Youth (2017)
- Kansas NEA Reading Circle Recommended Title, Top Pick (2018)

=== The Day the Universe Exploded My Head (2019) ===
The Day the Universe Exploded My Head: Poems to Take You Into Space and Back Again, illustrated by Anna Raff, was published March 5, 2019 by Candlewick Press.

The book received starred reviews from Kirkus and Booklist, as well as the following accolades:

- NCTE's Notable Poetry List (2020)
- New York Public Library's 100 Best Books for Kids

=== The Snow Fell Three Graves Deep (2020) ===
The Snow Fell Three Graves Deep: Voices from the Donner Party was published September 8, 2020 by Candlewick Press. It is told in multiple perspectives, including the voice of Hunger. It tells the entire story of the Donner Party and includes extensive appendices. While researching for the novel, Wolf spent time outdoors in the winter to understand what it felt like to be cold, and interviewed a man who experienced near-starvation. The book received starred reviews from BookPage, Booklist, Shelf Awareness for Readers, and The Horn Book, as well as the following accolades:

- American Library Association's Best Fiction for Young Adults (2021)
- Kansas NEA Reading Circle Recommended Title (2021)
- Finalist for the Los Angeles Times Book Prize for Young Adult Literature
- Cooperative Children's Book Center Choices Book List
- Los Angeles Times Book Prize, Young Adult

== Publications ==
- The Blood-Hungry Spleen and Other Poems About Our Parts, illustrated by Greg Clarke (2003)
- New Found Land: Lewis and Clark's Voyage of Discovery (2004)
- Immersed in Verse: An Informative, Slightly Irreverent Totally Tremendous Guide to Living the Poet's Life, illustrated by Tuesday Mourning (2006)
- Zane's Trace (2007)
- The Watch That Ends the Night (2011)
- Who Killed Christopher Goodman? (2017)
- The Day the Universe Exploded My Head: Poems to Take You Into Space and Back Again, illustrated by Anna Raff (2019)
- The Snow Fell Three Graves Deep (2020)
- No Buddy Like a Book, illustrated by Brianna Farley (2021)
- The Blanket Where Violet Sits (2022)
