= Karen Marie Moning =

American novelist (born 1964)

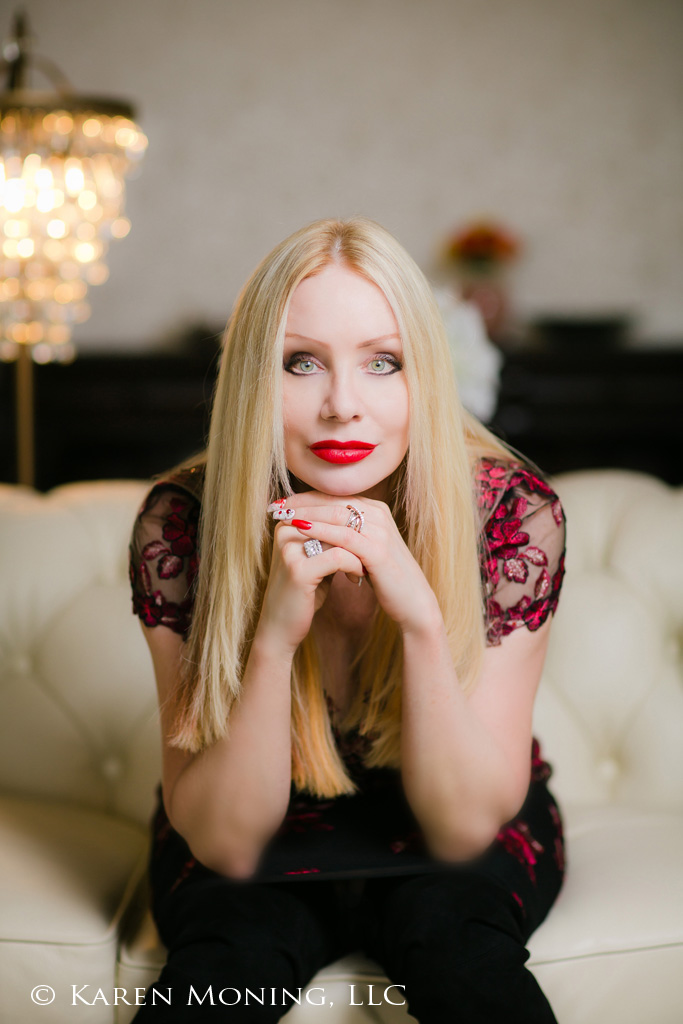
- Moning in 2015
- Born: November 1, 1964 (age 61); Cincinnati, Ohio, U.S.
- Education: Purdue University
- Occupation: Novelist
- Writing career
- Pen name: Karen Marie Moning
- Period: 1999–present
- Genres: Urban Fantasy, Paranormal Romance
- Notable works: Fever Series, Highlander Series
- Notable awards: Rita, Audie, Goodreads Choice Award
- Website: karenmoning.com

Karen Marie Moning (born November 1, 1964) is an American author. Many of her novels have appeared on The New York Times Best Seller list with Shadowfever reaching the number one position on multiple national best sellers lists. She is a winner of the prestigious Romance Writers of America RITA award for Best Paranormal Romance and is a multiple RITA nominee.

== Biography ==
Karen Marie Moning was born in Cincinnati, Ohio, the daughter of Anthony R. Moning and Janet L. Moning. Moning graduated from Purdue University with a bachelor's degree in Society and Law. Before becoming a full-time writer, she worked as a bartender, a computer consultant, and an insurance specialist.

Moning began her career writing paranormal romance set in Scotland. Beyond the Highland Mist was published in 1999 and nominated for two RITA awards. She then published six more novels in her award-winning Highlander series, and received the RITA Award in 2001 for The Highlander's Touch.

But as she became increasingly fascinated with Celtic mythology, she switched genres to urban fantasy and location to Dublin, Ireland, so she could focus on the Tuatha Dé Danann, or Fae—an ancient race of immortal beings who have lived secretly among humans for millennia.

== Bibliography ==
=== Highlander Series ===
1. Beyond the Highland Mist (1999/Mar), ISBN 978-0-440-23480-7
2. To Tame a Highland Warrior (1999/Dec), ISBN 978-0-440-24555-1
3. The Highlander's Touch (2000/Nov), ISBN 978-0-440-23652-8
4. Kiss of the Highlander (2001/Sep), ISBN 978-0-440-23655-9
5. The Dark Highlander (2002/Oct), ISBN 978-0-440-23755-6
6. The Immortal Highlander (2004/Aug), ISBN 978-0-440-23756-3
7. Spell of the Highlander (2005/Aug), ISBN 978-0-440-24097-6
8. Into The Dreaming (2006/Aug), ISBN 978-0-515-14150-4

=== Fever Series ===
1. Darkfever (2006/Oct), ISBN 978-0-440-24098-3
2. Bloodfever (2007/Oct), ISBN 978-0-440-24099-0
3. Faefever (2008/Sep), ISBN 978-0-440-24439-4
4. Dreamfever (2009/Aug), ISBN 978-0-385-34165-3
5. Shadowfever (2011/Jan), ISBN 978-0-385-34167-7
6. Iced (2012/Oct), ISBN 978-038534440-1
7. Burned (2015/Jan), ISBN 978-0-385-34441-8
8. Feverborn (2016/Jan), ISBN 978-0-385-34442-5
9. Feversong (2017/Jan), ISBN 978-0-425-28435-3
10. High Voltage (2018/Mar), ISBN 978-0-399-59366-6
11. Kingdom of Shadow and Light (2021/Feb), ISBN 978-0-399-59369-7

==== Fever Moon ====
Fever Moon is an original story from Karen Marie Moning, which has been adapted into a graphic novel by David Lawrence and illustrated by Al Rio.

=== The Watch Hill Trilogy ===
1. The House at Watch Hill (October 1, 2024), ISBN 978-0-06-324921-9
