= The Watch That Ends the Night (Wolf novel) =

2011 novel by Allan Wolf

The Watch That Ends the Night: Voices from the Titanic
- Author: Allan Wolf
- Language: English
- Genre: Young adult, historical fiction
- Publisher: Candlewick Press
- Publication date: March 26, 2013
- ISBN: 9780763663315

The Watch That Ends the Night: Voices from the Titanic is a fictional retelling of the sinking of Titanic in 1912, written by Allan Wolf and published on October 11, 2011, by Candlewick Press.

== Reception ==
The book was named one of Booklist's 50 Best YA Books of All Time. It also received starred reviews from Kirkus Reviews, The Horn Book Magazine, and Booklist, as well as the following accolades:

- Booklist Editors' Choice: Books for Youth (2011)
- American Library Association's (ALA) Best Fiction for Young Adults (2012)
- Bank Street College Claudia Lewis Award for Older Readers (2012)
- Pennsylvania Young Readers' Choice Award Nominee for Young Adults (2013)
- ALA's Amazing Audiobooks for Young Adults Top Ten (2013)
- Children's Book Council: Reading Beyond Booklist
- Young Adult Library Services Association's (YALSA) Outstanding Books for the College Bound
- North Carolina School Library Media Association Young Adult Book Award
- National Council for the Social Studies Notable Social Studies Trade Books for Young People
