= Audie Award for History or Biography =

Audio Publishers Association award for best history or biography audiobook

The Audie Award for History or Biography is one of the Audie Awards presented annually by the Audio Publishers Association (APA). It awards excellence in narration, production, and content for a history or biography audiobook released in a given year. Before 2015 this was given as two distinct awards, the Audie Award for Biography or Memoir (awarded since 2003; also split into the modern Audie Award for Autobiography or Memoir) and the Audie Award for History (awarded since 2009).

== Winners and finalists ==
=== 2010s ===
Year	Title	Author	Narrator(s)	Publisher	Result	Ref.
2015 20th	The Bully Pulpit: Theodore Roosevelt, William Howard Taft, and the Golden Age of Journalism (2013)	Doris Kearns Goodwin	Edward Herrmann	Simon & Schuster Audio	Winner	
2015 20th	Enduring Courage: Ace Pilot Eddie Rickenbacker and the Dawn of the Age of Speed (2014)	John F. Ross	Edward Herrmann	Macmillan Audio	Finalist	
2015 20th	Enemy Coast Ahead: Uncensored (2003)	Guy Gibson	Simon Vance	Tantor Audio	Finalist	
2015 20th	In the Kingdom of Ice: The Grand and Terrible Polar Voyage of the USS Jeannette (2014)	Hampton Sides	Arthur Morey	Penguin Random House Audio	Finalist	
2015 20th	Lincoln's Gamble: The Tumultuous Six Months That Gave America the Emancipation Proclamation and Changed the Course of the Civil War (2014)	Todd Brewster	Todd Brewster	Brilliance Audio	Finalist	
2015 20th	A Spy Among Friends: Kim Philby and the Great Betrayal (2014)	Ben Macintyre	John Rafter Lee	Penguin Random House Audio	Finalist	
2016 21st	A Man on the Moon: The Voyages of the Apollo Astronauts (1994)	Andrew Chaikin and Tom Hanks	Bronson Pinchot	Audiobooks.com Publishing	Winner	
2016 21st	In Search of Sir Thomas Browne: The Life and Afterlife (2015)	Hugh Aldersey-Williams	Simon Vance	HighBridge Audio/Recorded Books	Finalist	
2016 21st	Operation Nemesis: The Assassination Plot that Avenged the Armenian Genocide (2015)	Eric Bogosian	Eric Bogosian	Hachette Audio	Finalist	
2016 21st	Pacific: Silicon Chips and Surfboards, Coral Reefs and Atom Bombs, Brutal Dictators, Fading Empires, and the Coming Collision of the World's Superpowers (1991)	Simon Winchester	Simon Winchester	HarperAudio	Finalist	
2016 21st	Texas Rising: The Epic True Story of the Lone Star Republic (2015)	Stephen L. Moore	P. J. Ochlan	HarperAudio	Finalist	
2017 22nd	In Harm's Way: The Sinking of the U.S.S. Indianapolis and the Extraordinary Story of Its Survivors (2001)	Doug Stanton	Mark Boyett	Audible	Winner	
2017 22nd	Paul McCartney: The Life (2016)	Philip Norman	Jonathan Keeble	Recorded Books	Finalist	
2017 22nd	A Time to Die: The Untold Story of the Kursk Tragedy (2002)	Robert Moore	Pete Cross	Dreamscape	Finalist	
2017 22nd	Valiant Ambition: George Washington, Benedict Arnold, and the Fate of the American Revolution (2016)	Nathaniel Philbrick	Scott Brick	Penguin Random House Audio/Books on Tape	Finalist	
2017 22nd	The Year of Lear: Shakespeare in 1606 (2015)	James S. Shapiro	Robert Fass	Tantor Audio	Finalist	
2018 23rd	Loving vs. Virginia: A Documentary Novel of the Landmark Civil Rights Case (2017)	Patricia Hruby Powell	Adenrele Ojo and MacLeod Andrews	Dreamscape	Winner	
2018 23rd	Bette and Joan: The Divine Feud (1989)	Shaun Considine	January LaVoy	Graymalkin Media	Finalist	
2018 23rd	Born Survivors: Three Young Mothers and Their Extraordinary Story of Courage, Defiance, and Hope (2015)	Wendy Holden	Elizabeth Wiley	Tantor Audio	Finalist	
2018 23rd	Code Girls: The Untold Story of the American Women Code Breakers of World War II (2017)	Liza Mundy	Erin Bennett	Hachette Audio	Finalist	
2018 23rd	The Home Front: Life in America During World War II (2017)	Audible Originals, Martin Sheen, and Dan Gediman	Martin Sheen	Audible Originals	Finalist	
2018 23rd	My Life, My Love, My Legacy (2017)	Coretta Scott King and Barbara Reynolds	Phylicia Rashad and January LaVoy	Macmillan Audio	Finalist	
2019 24th	Darkest Hour: How Churchill Brought Us Back from the Brink (2018)	Anthony McCarten	John Rafter Lee	HarperAudio	Winner	
2019 24th	The Good Neighbor: The Life and Work of Fred Rogers (2018)	Maxwell King	LeVar Burton	Oasis Audio	Finalist	
2019 24th	Indianapolis: The True Story of the Worst Sea Disaster in U.S. Navy History and the Fifty-Year Fight to Exonerate an Innocent Man (2018)	Lynn Vincent and Sara Vladic	John Bedford Lloyd	Simon & Schuster Audio	Finalist	
2019 24th	Robin (2018)	Dave Itzkoff	Fred Berman and Dave Itzkoff	Macmillan Audio	Finalist	
2019 24th	We Were Soldiers Once… and Young (1992)	Harold G. Moore and Joseph L. Galloway	Jonathan Davis	Tantor Audio	Finalist	

=== 2020s ===
Year	Title	Author	Narrator(s)	Publisher	Result	Ref.
2020 25th	American Moonshot: John F. Kennedy and the Great Space Race (2019)	Douglas Brinkley	Stephen Graybill	HarperAudio	Winner	
2020 25th	The First Conspiracy: The Secret Plot to Kill George Washington (2019)	Brad Meltzer and Josh Mensch	Scott Brick	Macmillan Audio	Finalist	
2020 25th	Furious Hours: Murder, Fraud, and the Last Trial of Harper Lee (2019)	Casey Cep	Hillary Huber	Penguin Random House Audio	Finalist	
2020 25th	The Queen: The Forgotten Life Behind an American Myth (2019)	Josh Levin	January LaVoy	Hachette Audio	Finalist	
2020 25th	Theodore Roosevelt for the Defense (2019)	Dan Abrams and David Fisher	Roger Wayne and Dan Abrams	Harlequin	Finalist	
2021 26th	His Truth Is Marching On: John Lewis and the Power of Hope (2020)	Jon Meacham	JD Jackson	Penguin Random House Audio	Winner	
2021 26th	The Dead Are Arising: The Life of Malcolm X (2020)	Les Payne and Tamara Payne	Dion Graham	Recorded Books	Finalist	
2021 26th	Deep Delta Justice: A Black Teen, His Lawyer, and Their Groundbreaking Battle for Civil Rights in the South (2020)	Matthew Van Meter	Brad Sanders	Hachette Audio	Finalist	
2021 26th	J. R. R. Tolkien: The Making of a Legend (2012)	Colin Duriez	Simon Vance	Oasis Audio	Finalist	
2021 26th	Just Us: An American Conversation (2020)	Claudia Rankine	Janina Edwards	Audible	Finalist	
2021 26th	The Lincoln Conspiracy (1977)	Brad Meltzer and Josh Mensch	Scott Brick	Macmillan Audio	Finalist	
2022 27th	Clanlands: Whisky, Warfare, and a Scottish Adventure Like No Other	Sam Heughan and Graham McTavish	Sam Heughan and Graham McTavish	Hodder & Stoughton	Winner	
2022 27th	Music Is History	Ahmir Khalib Thompson (Questlove)	Ahmir Khalib Thompson (Questlove)	Recorded Books	Finalist	
2022 27th	Somersett: Benjamin Franklin and the Masterminding of American Independence	Philip Goodrich	Robert Petkoff , Joe Morton, Simon Jones, Euan Morton, Nicola Barber, and the author (Author's note and afterword)	Blackstone Publishing and May Wuthrich Productions	Finalist	
2022 27th	The Code Breaker (2021)	Walter Isaacson	Kathe Mazur with Walter Isaacson	Simon & Schuster Audio	Finalist	
2022 27th	A Weekend with Pablo Picasso	Herbert Sigüenza	Herbert Sigüenza	L.A. Theatre Works	Finalist	
2023 27th	Summer of '85	Chris Morrow, Kevin Hart, Tara Thomas, Nicole Shelton, Charlamagne Tha God, Marc Gerald, Dave Becky, Mike Stein, Thai Randolph, Bryan Smiley, and Karen Kinney	Kevin Hart	Audible Originals	Winner	
2023 27th	An Afro-Indigenous History of the United States	Kyle T. Mays	Shaun Taylor-Corbett	Beacon Press Audio	Finalist	
2023 27th	His Name is George Floyd (2022)	Robert Samuels and Toluse Olorunnipa	Dion Graham, Robert Samuels, and Toluse Olorunnipa	Penguin Random House Audio	Finalist	
2023 27th	Last Slave Ship	Ben Raines	Kevin R. Free	Simon & Schuster Audio	Finalist	
2023 27th	Undelivered	Jeff Nussbaum	Adam Gifford, Brian Bowles, Elisa Roth, Garrick Hagon, Glen McCready, Greg Lockett, James Lailey, Jeff Nussbaum, Johnny Heller, Kathleen Chalfant, Kurt Kanazawa, and Lance Blair	Macmillan Audio	Finalist	
2024 29th	Goodbye Christopher Robin: A.A. Milne and the Making of Winnie-the-Pooh	Ann Thwaite, preface by Frank Cottrell-Boyce	Simon Vance	Tantor Audio	Winner	
2024 29th	Elon Musk	Walter Isaacson	Jeremy Bobb and Walter Isaacson	Simon & Schuster Audio	Finalist	
2024 29th	Empire of Ice and Stone: The Disastrous and Heroic Voyage of the Karluk	Buddy Levy	Will Damron	Macmillan Audio	Finalist	
2024 29th	The Wager: A Tale of Shipwreck, Mutiny and Murder (2023)	David Grann	Dion Graham with David Grann	Penguin Random House Audio	Finalist	
2024 29th	King: A Life	Jonathan Eig	Dion Graham	Macmillan Audio	Finalist	
2025 30th	The Loves of Theodore Roosevelt: The Women Who Created the President	Edward F. O'Keefe	Edward F. O'Keefe	Simon & Schuster Audio	Winner	
2025 30th	Challenger: A True Story of Heroism and Disaster on the Edge of Space	Adam Higginbotham	Jacques Roy	Simon & Schuster Audio	Finalist	
2025 30th	Codename Nemo	Charles Lachman	Qarie Marshall	Dreamscape Media LLC	Finalist	
2025 30th	The Demon of Unrest	Erik Larson	Will Patton and Erik Larson	Penguin Random House Audio	Finalist	
2025 30th	The Showman	Simon Shuster	Daniel Gamburg	HarperAudio	Finalist	
2026 31st	Baldwin: A Love Story	Nicholas Boggs	Ron Butler	Macmillan Audio	Winner	
2026 31st	The Fate of the Day	Rick Atkinson	Grover Gardner and Rick Atkinson	Penguin Random House Audio	Finalist	
2026 31st	Mark Twain	Ron Chernow	Jason Culp	Penguin Random House Audio	Finalist	
2026 31st	The Spinach King: The Rise and Fall of an American Dynasty	John Seabrook	Dion Graham	HighBridge Audio	Finalist	
2026 31st	The Zorg	Siddharth Kara	Dion Graham	Macmillan Audio	Finalist	

== Biography/Memoir winners and finalists 2003–2014 ==
=== 2000s ===
Year	Title	Author	Narrator(s)	Publisher	Result	Ref.
2003 8th	Lucky Man: A Memoir (2002)	Michael J. Fox	Michael J. Fox	Simon & Schuster Audio	Winner	
2003 8th	Getting to Know William Shakespeare (2001)	Joy Wake	Fred Child	Echo Peak Productions	Finalist	
2003 8th	Legacy (2002)	Doc Watson and David Holt	Doc Watson and David Holt	High Windy Audio	Finalist	
2003 8th	Theodore Rex (2001)	Edmund Morris	Harry Chase	Random House Audio	Finalist	
2003 8th	Touch the Top of the World: A Blind Man's Journey to Climb Farther Than the Eye Can See (2002) b	Erik Weihenmayer	Nick Sullivan	The Audio Partners Publishing Corp.	Finalist	
2004 9th	The Nazi Officer's Wife: How One Jewish Woman Survived the Holocaust (1999)	Edith Hahn Beer	Barbara Rosenblat	Jewish Contemporary Classics	Winner	
2004 9th	A Long Way from Home: Growing Up in the American Heartland (2002)	Tom Brokaw	Tom Brokaw	Random House Audio	Finalist	
2004 9th	Benjamin Franklin: An American Life (2003)	Walter Isaacson	Boyd Gaines	Simon & Schuster Audio	Finalist	
2004 9th	Hannibal: One Man Against Rome (1958)	Harold Lamb	Charlton Griffin	Audio Connoisseur	Finalist	
2004 9th	My Invented Country: A Nostalgic Journey Through Chile (2003)	Isabel Allende	Blair Brown	HarperAudio	Finalist	
2005 10th	Chronicles: Volume One (2004)	Bob Dylan	Sean Penn	Simon & Schuster Audio	Winner	
2005 10th	Big Russ and Me: Father and Son (2004)	Tim Russert	Tim Russert	Hyperion AudioBooks	Finalist	
2005 10th	Funny in Farsi: A Memoir of Growing Up Iranian in America (2003)	Firoozeh Dumas	Firoozeh Dumas	Audible	Finalist	
2005 10th	Holy Cow: An Indian Adventure (2002)	Sarah McDonald	Kate Hosking	Bolinda Audio	Finalist	
2005 10th	The House on Beartown Road (2003)	Elizabeth Cohen	Bernadette Dunne	Blackstone Audio	Finalist	
2005 10th	Mornings on Horseback (1981)	David McCullough	Edward Herrmann	Simon & Schuster Audio	Finalist	
2005 10th	The Twelve Caesars (AD 121)	Suetonius	Charlton Griffin	Audio Connoisseur	Finalist	
2006 11th	Garlic and Sapphires: The Secret Life of a Critic in Disguise (2005)	Ruth Reichl	Ruth Reichl	Random House Audio	Winner	
2006 11th	iCon: Steve Jobs, The Greatest Second Act in the History of Business (2005)	Jeffrey S. Young and William L. Simon	Alan Sklar, Jeffrey S. Young, and William L. Simon	Penton Overseas	Finalist	
2006 11th	The Tender Bar (2005)	J. R. Moehringer	J. R. Moehringer	Time Warner AudioBooks	Finalist	
2006 11th	We Are All the Same: A Story of a Boy's Courage and a Mother's Love (2004)	Jim Wooten	Alan Sklar	Tantor Audio	Finalist	
2006 11th	The Year of Magical Thinking (2005)	Joan Didion	Barbara Caruso	HighBridge Audio	Finalist	
2007 12th	Teacher Man (2005)	Frank McCourt	Frank McCourt	Simon & Schuster Audio	Winner	
2007 12th	Diana: Finally, the Complete Story (2006)	Sarah Bradford	Katherine Kellgren	Penguin Audio	Finalist	
2007 12th	Dispatches from the Edge (2006)	Anderson Cooper	Anderson Cooper	HarperAudio	Finalist	
2007 12th	Elizabeth (2006)	J. Randy Taraborrelli	Lynne Maclean	Hachette Audio	Finalist	
2007 12th	Sound and Fury: Two Powerful Lives, One Fateful Friendship (2006)	David Kindred	Dick Hill	Blackstone Audio	Finalist	
2007 12th	The Great Escape: Nine Jews Who Fled Hitler and Changed the World (2006)	Kati Marton	Anna Fields	Tantor Audio	Finalist	
2008 13th	Einstein: His Life and Universe (2007)	Walter Isaacson	Edward Herrmann	Simon & Schuster Audio	Winner	
2008 13th	My Lobotomy (2007)	Howard Dully and Charles Fleming	Johnny Heller	Tantor Audio	Finalist	
2008 13th	Schulz and Peanuts: A Biography (2007)	David Michaelis	Holter Graham	HarperAudio	Finalist	
2008 13th	Shakespeare: The World As Stage (2007)	Bill Bryson	Bill Bryson	HarperAudio	Finalist	
2008 13th	Tearing Down the Wall of Sound (2008)	Mick Brown	Ray Porter	Blackstone Audio	Finalist	
2009 14th	The Last Lecture (2008)	Randy Pausch	Erik Singer	HyperionAudio	Winner	
2009 14th	Black Wave: A Family's Adventure at Sea and the Disaster (2008)	John and Jean Silverwood and Malcolm McConnell	Carrington MacDuffie and Joe Barrett	Blackstone Audio	Finalist	
2009 14th	The Legs Are the Last to Go (2008)	Diahann Carroll	Diahann Carroll	HarperAudio	Finalist	
2009 14th	The Middle Place (2005)	Kelly Corrigan	Tavia Gilbert	Blackstone Audio	Finalist	
2009 14th	Waiter Rant (2008)	Steve Dublanica	Dan John Miller	Brilliance Audio	Finalist	

=== 2010s ===
Year	Title	Author	Narrator(s)	Publisher	Result	Ref.
2010 15th	Anne Frank Remembered: The Story of the Woman Who Helped to Hide the Frank Family (1987)	Miep Gies and Leslie Gold	Barbara Rosenblat	Oasis Audio	Winner	
2010 15th	The Golden Willow: The Story of a Lifetime of Love (2009)	Harry Bernstein	Mike Kellogg	Oasis Audio	Finalist	
2010 15th	The Secret Holocaust Diaries: The Untold Story of Nonna Bannister (2009)	Nonna Bannister and Denise George	Rebecca Gallagher	Oasis Audio	Finalist	
2010 15th	True Compass (2009)	Edward Kennedy	John Bedford Lloyd	Hachette Audio	Finalist	
2010 15th	Valkyrie: The Story of the Plot to Kill Hitler by Its Last Member (2009)	Philipp Freiherr von Boeselager and Florence and Jérôme Fehrenbach	Michael Prichard	Tantor Audio	Finalist	
2011 16th	Life (2010)	Keith Richards	Johnny Depp and Joe Hurley	Hachette Audio	Winner	
2011 16th	The Slave Across the Street: The True Story of How an American Teen Survived the World of Human Trafficking (2010)	Theresa Flores	Renee Raudman	ChristianAudio	Finalist	
2011 16th	Somewhere Inside (2010)	Lisa Ling and Laura Ling	Lisa Ling and Laura Ling	HarperAudio	Finalist	
2011 16th	This Time Together (2010)	Carol Burnett	Carol Burnett	Random House Audio	Finalist	
2011 16th	Abigail Adams: A Life (2009)	Woody Holton	Cassandra Campbell	Tantor Audio	Finalist	
2012 17th	Bossypants (2011)	Tina Fey	Tina Fey	Hachette Audio	Winner	
2012 17th	The Dirty Life: A Memoir of Farming, Food, and Love (2010)	Kristin Kimball	Tavia Gilbert	Tantor Audio	Finalist	
2012 17th	Here Comes Trouble: Stories from My Life (2011)	Michael Moore	Michael Moore	Hachette Audio	Finalist	
2012 17th	My Dog Tulip (1956)	J. R. Ackerley	Ralph Cosham	Blackstone Audio	Finalist	
2012 17th	Until Tuesday: A Wounded Warrior and the Golden Retriever (2011)	Luis Carlos Montalvan	Luis Carlos Montalvan	Audible	Finalist	
2013 18th	The Seamstress: A Memoir of Survival (1999)	Sara Tuvel Bernstein, Louise Loots Thornton, and Marlene Bernstein Samuels	Wanda McCaddon	Tantor Audio	Winner	
2013 18th	Cronkite (2012)	Douglas Brinkley	George Guidall	HarperAudio	Finalist	
2013 18th	Lady Almina and the Real Downton Abbey (2011)	Fiona Aitken, Lady Carnarvon	Wanda McCaddon	Tantor Audio	Finalist	
2013 18th	My Cross to Bear (2012)	Gregg Allman and Alan Light	Will Patton	HarperAudio	Finalist	
2013 18th	Two Rings: A Story of Love and War (2012)	Millie Werber and Eve Keller	Yelena Shmulenson and Eve Keller	HighBridge Audio	Finalist	
2014 19th	The Elephant Whisperer: My Life with the Herd in the African Wild (2009)	Lawrence Anthony and Graham Spence	Simon Vance	Tantor Audio	Winner	
2014 19th	[sic]: A Memoir (2011)	Joshua Cody	Edoardo Ballerini	Audible	Finalist	
2014 19th	My Beloved World (1992)	Sonia Sotomayor	Rita Moreno	Random House Audio/Books on Tape	Finalist	
2014 19th	World on a String (2012)	John Pizzarelli	Joseph Cosgriff	Audible	Finalist	
2014 19th	I Am Malala: The Story of the Girl Who Stood Up for Education and Was Shot by the Taliban (2013)	Malala Yousafzai	Archie Panjabi	Hachette Audio	Finalist	

== History winners and finalists 2009–2014 ==
=== 2000s ===
Year	Title	Author	Narrator(s)	Publisher	Result	Ref.
2009 14th	Gandhi and Churchill: The Epic Rivalry That Destroyed an Empire and Forged Our Age (2008)	Arthur Herman	John Curless	Recorded Books	Winner	
2009 14th	Pictures at a Revolution (2008)	Mark Harris	Lloyd James	Tantor Audio	Finalist	
2009 14th	The Bloody Shirt (2008)	Stephen Budiansky	Phil Gigante	Brilliance Audio	Finalist	
2009 14th	The Ghost Mountain Boys (2007)	James Campbell	Stephen Hoye	Tantor Audio	Finalist	
2009 14th	The Hemingses of Monticello (2008)	Annette Gordon-Reed	Karen White	Tantor Audio	Finalist	

=== 2010s ===
Year	Title	Author	Narrator(s)	Publisher	Result	Ref.
2010 15th	Tears in the Darkness: The Story of the Bataan Death March and Its Aftermath (2009)	Michael Norman and Elizabeth M. Norman	Michael Prichard	Tantor Audio	Winner	
2010 15th	1864: Lincoln at the Gates of History (2009)	Charles Bracelen Flood	Mel Foster	Tantor Audio	Finalist	
2010 15th	The Ascent of Money: A Financial History of the World (2008)	Niall Ferguson	Simon Prebble	Tantor Audio	Finalist	
2010 15th	Bury My Heart at Wounded Knee: An Indian History of the American West (1970)	Dee Brown	Grover Gardner	Blackstone Audio	Finalist	
2010 15th	The Long Knives Are Crying (2008)	Joseph M. Marshall III	Joseph M. Marshall III	Blackstone Audio	Finalist	
2011 16th	Empire of Liberty: A History of the Early Republic (2009)	Gordon S. Wood	Robert Fass	Audible	Winner	
2011 16th	1959: The Year Everything Changed (2009)	Fred Kaplan	Joe Barrett	Audible	Finalist	
2011 16th	The History of Rome, Volume 1 (9 BC)	Livy	Charlton Griffin	Audio Connoisseur	Finalist	
2011 16th	A People's History of the United States (1980)	Howard Zinn	Jeff Zinn	Harper Audio	Finalist	
2011 16th	Vikings of the Ice: Being the Log of a Tenderfoot on the Great (1924)	George Allan England	Frank Holden	Rattling Books	Finalist	
2012 17th	1861: The Civil War Awakening (2011)	Adam Goodheart	Jonathan Davis	Audible	Winner	
2012 17th	1812: The Navy's War (2011)	George C. Daughan	Marc Vietor	Audible	Finalist	
2012 17th	Eichmann in Jerusalem: A Report on the Banality of Evil (1963)	Hannah Arendt	Wanda McCaddon	Tantor Audio	Finalist	
2012 17th	The Emperor of All Maladies: A Biography of Cancer (2010)	Siddhartha Mukherjee	Stephen Hoye	Tantor Audio	Finalist	
2012 17th	In the Garden of Beasts: Love, Terror, and an American Family in Hitler's Berlin (2011)	Erik Larson	Stephen Hoye	Random House Audio/Books on Tape	Finalist	
2013 18th	The Wrecking Crew: The Inside Story of Rock and Roll's Best-Kept Secret (2012)	Kent Hartman	Dan John Miller	Tantor Audio	Winner	
2013 18th	Da Vinci's Ghost: Genius, Obsession, and How Leonardo Created the World in His Own Image (2012)	Toby Lester	Stephen Hoye	Tantor Audio	Finalist	
2013 18th	L.A. Noir: The Struggle for the Soul of America's Most Seductive City (2009)	John Buntin	Kirby Heyborne	Tantor Audio	Finalist	
2013 18th	Pacific Crucible: War at Sea in the Pacific, 1941–1942 (2011)	Ian W. Toll	Grover Gardner	Audible	Finalist	
2013 18th	Season of the Witch: Enchantment, Terror, and Deliverance in the City of Love (2012)	David Talbot	Arthur Morey	Brilliance Audio	Finalist	
2013 18th	Twelve Desperate Miles: The Epic World War II Voyage of the SS Contessa (2013)	Tim Brady	Joe Barrett	AudioGo	Finalist	
2014 19th	Devil in the Grove: Thurgood Marshall, the Groveland Boys, and the Dawn of a New America (2012)	Gilbert King	Peter Francis James	HarperAudio	Winner	
2014 19th	C. C. Pyle's Amazing Foot Race: The True Story of the 1928 Coast-to-Coast Run Across America (2007)	Geoff Williams	Robertson Dean	Tantor Audio	Finalist	
2014 19th	Frozen in Time: An Epic Story of Survival and a Modern Quest for Lost Heroes of World War II (2013)	Mitchell Zuckoff	Mitchell Zuckoff	HarperAudio	Finalist	
2014 19th	The Hour of Peril: The Secret Plot to Murder Lincoln Before the Civil War (2013)	Daniel Stashower	Edoardo Ballerini	Macmillan Audio	Finalist	
2014 19th	Nero's Killing Machine: The True Story of Rome's Remarkable 14th Legion (2005)	Stephen Dando-Collins	Robert Fass	Audible	Finalist	
2014 19th	One Summer: America, 1927 (2013)	Bill Bryson	Bill Bryson	Random House Audio/Books on Tape	Finalist	
