= Audie Award for Autobiography or Memoir =

The Audie Award for Autobiography or Memoir is one of the Audie Awards presented annually by the Audio Publishers Association (APA). It awards excellence in narration, production, and content for an audiobook autobiography or memoir released in a given year. It has been awarded since 2015 when it was broken apart, along with the Audie Award for History or Biography, from the Audie Award for Biography or Memoir (awarded since 2003).

== Winners and finalists ==
=== 2010s ===
Year of Release	Audiobook	Author	Narrator	Audiobook Publisher
2015 20th	Not My Father's Son (2014)	Alan Cumming	Alan Cumming	HarperAudio
2015 20th	Daring: My Passages (2015)	Gail Sheehy	Bernadette Dunne	HarperAudio
2015 20th	Living on Air (2011)	Joe Cipriano and Ann Cipriano	Joe Cipriano	Joe Cipriano Promos
2015 20th	My Life in Middlemarch (2014)	Rebecca Mead	Kate Reading	Blackstone Audio
2015 20th	Yes Please (2014)	Amy Poehler	Amy Poehler, Carol Burnett, Seth Meyers, Mike Schur, Eileen and William Poehler, Patrick Stewart, and Kathleen Turner	HarperAudio
2016 21st	Ghost Boy (2011)	Martin Pistorius	Simon Bubb	Thomas Nelson/HarperAudio
2016 21st	Born with Teeth (2015)	Kate Mulgrew	Kate Mulgrew	Hachette Audio
2016 21st	The Courage to Act	Ben S. Bernanke	Grover Gardner	Brilliance Audio
2016 21st	I Must Say (2014)	Martin Short	Martin Short	HarperAudio
2016 21st	Keep Moving, and Other Tips and Truths About Aging (2015)	Dick Van Dyke	Dick Van Dyke	Blackstone Audio
2016 21st	Travels (1988)	Michael Crichton	Christopher Lane	Brilliance Audio
2017 22nd	The Greatest: My Own Story (1975)	Muhammad Ali and Richard Durham	Dion Graham	Graymalkin Media
2017 22nd	Around the Way Girl (2016)	Taraji P. Henson	Taraji P. Henson	Simon & Schuster Audio
2017 22nd	Buffering: Unshared Tales of a Life Fully Loaded (2016)	Hannah Hart	Hannah Hart and Judy Young	HarperAudio
2017 22nd	The Rainbow Comes and Goes (2017)	Anderson Cooper and Gloria Vanderbilt	Anderson Cooper and Gloria Vanderbilt	HarperAudio
2017 22nd	When Breath Becomes Air (2016)	Paul Kalanithi	Sunil Malhotra and Cassandra Campbell	Penguin Random House Audio/Books on Tape
2018 23rd	Born to Run (2016)	Bruce Springsteen	Bruce Springsteen	Simon & Schuster Audio
2018 23rd	Al Franken, Giant of the Senate (2017)	Al Franken	Al Franken	Hachette Audio
2018 23rd	Born a Crime (2016)	Trevor Noah	Trevor Noah	Audible
2018 23rd	Nevertheless (2017)	Alec Baldwin	Alec Baldwin	HarperAudio
2018 23rd	We're Going to Need More Wine (2017)	Gabrielle Union	Gabrielle Union	HarperAudio
2018 23rd	What Happened (2017)	Hillary Rodham Clinton	Hillary Rodham Clinton	Simon & Schuster Audio
2019 24th	Educated (2018)	Tara Westover	Julia Whelan	Penguin Random House Audio
2019 24th	Failing Up: How to Take Risks, Aim Higher, and Never Stop Learning (2018)	Leslie Odom, Jr.	Leslie Odom, Jr.	Audible
2019 24th	In Pieces (2018)	Sally Field	Sally Field	Hachette Audio
2019 24th	Letter to Louis (2018)	Alison White	Eve Webster	Bolinda Audio
2019 24th	Small Fry (2018)	Lisa Brennan-Jobs	Eileen Stevens	Blackstone Audio

=== 2020s ===
Year	Audiobook	Author	Narrator	Publisher	Result	Ref.
2020 25th	Becoming (2018)	Michelle Obama	Michelle Obama	Penguin Random House Audio	Winner	
2020 25th	From Scratch (2019)	Tembi Locke	Tembi Locke	Simon & Schuster Audio	Finalist	
2020 25th	Me (2019)	Elton John	Taron Egerton and Elton John	Macmillan Audio	Finalist	
2020 25th	MotherStruck! (2019)	Staceyann Chin	Staceyann Chin	Audible Originals	Finalist	
2020 25th	Too Much Is Not Enough (2019)	Andrew Rannells	Andrew Rannells	Penguin Random House Audio	Finalist	
2021 26th	The Autobiography of Malcolm X (1965)	Malcolm X and Alex Haley	Laurence Fishburne	Audible	Winner	
2021 26th	Becoming Duchess Goldblatt (2020)	Anonymous	Gabra Zackman (feat. J. Smith-Cameron and Lyle Lovett)	HMH Audio	Finalist	
2021 26th	Mr. New Orleans: The Life of a Big Easy Underworld Legend (2009)	Frenchy Brouillette and Matthew Randazzo	Louis Herthum	Sound Off Productions	Finalist	
2021 26th	Sigh, Gone (2020)	Phuc Tran	Phuc Tran	Macmillan Audio	Finalist	
2021 26th	Uncanny Valley (2020)	Anna Wiener	Suehyla El-Attar	Macmillan Audio	Finalist	
2022 27th	Somebody's Daughter	Ashley C. Ford	Ashley C. Ford	Macmillan Audio	Winner	
2022 27th	Act Like You Got Some Sense	Jamie Foxx, foreword by Corinne Foxx	Jamie Foxx, foreword by Corinne Foxx	Hachette Audio	Finalist	
2022 27th	The Boys	Ron Howard and Clint Howard	Ron Howard, Clint Howard, and Bryce Dallas Howard	HarperAudio	Finalist	
2022 27th	Fits and Starts: A Memoir of Living with Epilepsy	Franziska Thomas	Tracy Wiles and Franziska Thomas	Almost Tangible	Finalist	
2022 27th	Listen Mama	M. S. P. Williams	JD Jackson	Souls Take Flight	Finalist	
2023 28th	Unprotected: A Memoir	Billy Porter	Billy Porter	Recorded Books, a division of RBmedia	Winner	
2023 28th	The Extraordinary Life of an Ordinary Man	Paul Newman, edited by David Rosenthall	Jeff Daniels, Melissa Newman, Clea Newman Soderlund, Ari Fliakos, January LaVoy, John Rubinstein, and Emily Wachtel	Penguin Random House Audio	Finalist	
2023 28th	Hello, Molly	Molly Shannon	Molly Shannon	HarperAudio	Finalist	
2023 28th	Left on Tenth	Delia Ephron	Delia Ephron	Hachette Audio	Finalist	
2023 28th	Safe, Wanted, and Loved: A Family Memoir of Mental Illness, Heartbreak, and Hope	Patrick Dylan	Raúl E. Esparza	Snow Anselmo Press with Girl Friday Productions	Finalist	
2024 29th	Making It So	Patrick Stewart	Patrick Stewart	Simon & Schuster Audio	Winner	
2024 29th	Behind the Seams	Dolly Parton, Holly George-Warren, and Rebecca Seaver	Dolly Parton, Holly George-Warren, and Rebecca Seaver	Penguin Random House Audio	Finalist	
2024 29th	La Finca: Love, Loss, and Laundry on a Tiny Puerto Rican Island	Corky Parker	Corky Parker	Lantern Audio	Finalist	
2024 29th	Saved: A War Reporter's Mission to Make it Home	Benjamin Hall	Benjamin Hall	HarperAudio	Finalist	
2024 29th	A Place for Us	Brandon J. Wolf	Brandon J. Wolf	Brilliance Publishing	Finalist	
2025 30th	My Name Is Barbra (2023)	Barbra Streisand	Barbra Streisand	Penguin Random House Audio	Winner	
2025 30th	Farewell Yellow Brick Road	Elton John, foreword by David Furnish	Richard Armitage, Vikas Adam, and a full cast	Audible Studios	Finalist	
2025 30th	In My Time of Dying: How I Came Face to Face with the Idea of an Afterlife	Sebastian Junger	Sebastian Junger	Simon & Schuster Audio	Finalist	
2025 30th	Knife	Salman Rushdie	Salman Rushdie	Penguin Random House Audio	Finalist	
2025 30th	The Third Gilmore Girl: A Memoir	Kelly Bishop	Kelly Bishop	Simon & Schuster Audio	Finalist	
2026 31st	Matriarch: A Memoir	Tina Knowles	Tina Knowles, Beyoncé, Solange Knowles, Kelly Rowland, and Angie Beyincé	Penguin Random House Audio	Winner	
2026 31st	Cher: Part One	Cher	Cher and Stephanie J. Block	HarperAudio	Finalist	
2026 31st	Code Name: Pale Horse	Scott Payne	Scott Payne with Michelle Shephard	Simon & Schuster Audio	Finalist	
2026 31st	The Heart of a Woman (1961)	Maya Angelou	Uzo Aduba	Penguin Random House Audio	Finalist	
2026 31st	Nobody's Girl	Virginia Roberts Giuffre	Thérèse Plummer and Gabra Zackman	Penguin Random House Audio	Finalist	

== Biography/Memoir winners and finalists 2003–2014 ==
=== 2000s ===
Year of Release	Audiobook	Author	Narrator	Audiobook Publisher
2003 8th	Lucky Man: A Memoir (2002)	Michael J. Fox	Michael J. Fox	Simon & Schuster Audio
2003 8th	Getting to Know William Shakespeare (2001)	Joy Wake	Patrick Child	Echo Peak Productions
2003 8th	Legacy (2002)	Doc Watson and David Holt	Doc Watson and David Holt	High Windy Audio
2003 8th	Theodore Rex (2001)	Edmund Morris	Harry Chase	Random House Audio
2003 8th	Touch the Top of the World: A Blind Man's Journey to Climb Farther Than the Eye Can See (2002)	Erik Weihenmayer	Nick Sullivan	The Audio Partners Publishing Corp.
2004 9th	The Nazi Officer's Wife (1999)	Edith Hahn Beer	Barbara Rosenblat	Jewish Contemporary Classics
2004 9th	A Long Way from Home (2002)	Tom Brokaw	Tom Brokaw	Random House Audio
2004 9th	Benjamin Franklin: An American Life (2003)	Walter Isaacson	Boyd Gaines	Simon & Schuster Audio
2004 9th	Hannibal: One Man Against Rome (1958)	Harold Lamb	Charlton Griffin	Audio Connoisseur
2004 9th	My Invented Country: A Nostalgic Journey Through Chile (2003)	Isabel Allende	Blair Brown	HarperAudio
2005 10th	Chronicles: Volume One (2004)	Bob Dylan	Sean Penn	Simon & Schuster Audio
2005 10th	Big Russ and Me: Father and Son (2004)	Tim Russert	Tim Russert	Hyperion AudioBooks
2005 10th	Funny in Farsi: A Memoir of Growing Up Iranian in America (2003)	Firoozeh Dumas	Firoozeh Dumas	Audible
2005 10th	Holy Cow: An Indian Adventure (2002)	Sarah McDonald	Kate Hosking	Bolinda Audio
2005 10th	The House on Beartown Road (2003)	Elizabeth Cohen	Bernadette Dunne	Blackstone Audio
2005 10th	Mornings on Horseback (1981)	David McCullough	Edward Herrmann	Simon & Schuster Audio
2005 10th	The Twelve Caesars (AD 121)	Suetonius	Charlton Griffin	Audio Connoisseur
2006 11th	Garlic and Sapphires: The Secret Life of a Critic in Disguise (2005)	Ruth Reichl	Ruth Reichl	Random House Audio
2006 11th	iCon: Steve Jobs, The Greatest Second Act in the History of Business (2005)	Jeffrey S. Young and William L. Simon	Alan Sklar, Jeffrey S. Young, and William L. Simon	Penton Overseas
2006 11th	The Tender Bar (2005)	J. R. Moehringer	J. R. Moehringer	Time Warner AudioBooks
2006 11th	We Are All the Same: A Story of a Boy's Courage and a Mother's Love (2004)	Jim Wooten	Alan Sklar	Tantor Audio
2006 11th	The Year of Magical Thinking (2005)	Joan Didion	Barbara Caruso	HighBridge Audio
2007 12th	Teacher Man (2005)	Frank McCourt	Frank McCourt	Simon & Schuster Audio
2007 12th	Diana: Finally, the Complete Story (2006)	Sarah Bradford	Katie Kellgren	Penguin Audio
2007 12th	Dispatches from the Edge (2006)	Anderson Cooper	Anderson Cooper	HarperAudio
2007 12th	Elizabeth (2006)	J. Randy Taraborrelli	Lynne Maclean	Hachette Audio
2007 12th	Sound and Fury: Two Powerful Lives, One Fateful Friendship (2006)	David Kindred	Dick Hill	Blackstone Audio
2007 12th	The Great Escape (2006)	Kati Marton	Anna Fields	Tantor Audio
2008 13th	Einstein: His Life and Universe (2007)	Walter Isaacson	Edward Herrmann	Simon & Schuster Audio
2008 13th	My Lobotomy (2007)	Howard Dully and Charles Fleming	Johnny Heller	Tantor Audio
2008 13th	Schulz and Peanuts: A Biography (2007)	David Michaelis	Holter Graham	HarperAudio
2008 13th	Shakespeare: The World As Stage (2007)	Bill Bryson	Bill Bryson	HarperAudio
2008 13th	Tearing Down the Wall of Sound (2008)	Mick Brown	Ray Porter	Blackstone Audio
2009 14th	The Last Lecture (2008)	Randy Pausch	Erik Singer	HyperionAudio
2009 14th	Black Wave: A Family's Adventure at Sea and the Disaster (2008)	John and Jean Silverwood and Malcolm McConnell	Carrington MacDuffie and Joe Barrett	Blackstone Audio
2009 14th	The Legs Are the Last to Go (2008)	Diahann Carroll	Diahann Carroll	HarperAudio
2009 14th	The Middle Place (2005)	Kelly Corrigan	Tavia Gilbert	Blackstone Audio
2009 14th	Waiter Rant (2008)	Steve Dublanica	Dan John Miller	Brilliance Audio

=== 2010s ===
Year of Release	Audiobook	Author	Narrator	Audiobook Publisher
2010 15th	Anne Frank Remembered (1987)	Miep Gies and Leslie Gold	Barbara Rosenblat	Oasis Audio
2010 15th	The Golden Willow (2009)	Harry Bernstein	Mike Kellogg	Oasis Audio
2010 15th	The Secret Holocaust Diaries (2009)	Nonna Bannisterand Denise George	Rebecca Gallagher	Oasis Audio
2010 15th	True Compass (2009)	Edward Kennedy	John Bedford Lloyd	Hachette Audio
2010 15th	Valkyrie (2009)	Philipp Freiherr von Boeselagerand Florence and Jérôme Fehrenbach	Michael Prichard	Tantor Audio
2011 16th	Life (2010)	Keith Richards	Johnny Deppand Joe Hurley	Hachette Audio
2011 16th	The Slave Across the Street (2010)	Theresa Flores	Renee Raudman	ChristianAudio
2011 16th	Somewhere Inside (2010)	Lisa Ling and Laura Ling	Lisa Ling and Laura Ling	HarperAudio
2011 16th	This Time Together (2010)	Carol Burnett	Carol Burnett	Random House Audio
2011 16th	Abigail Adams: A Life (2009)	Woody Holton	Cassandra Campbell	Tantor Audio
2012 17th	Bossypants (2011)	Tina Fey	Tina Fey	Hachette Audio
2012 17th	The Dirty Life: A Memoir of Farming, Food, and Love (2010)	Kristin Kimball	Tavia Gilbert	Tantor Audio
2012 17th	Here Comes Trouble: Stories from My Life (2011)	Michael Moore	Michael Moore	Hachette Audio
2012 17th	My Dog Tulip (1956)	J. R. Ackerley	Ralph Cosham	Blackstone Audio
2012 17th	Until Tuesday: A Wounded Warrior and the Golden Retriever (2011)	Luis Carlos Montalvan	Luis Carlos Montalvan	Audible
2013 18th	The Seamstress (1999)	Sara Tuvel Bernstein, Louise Loots Thornton, and Marlene Bernstein Samuels	Wanda McCaddon	Tantor Audio
2013 18th	Cronkite (2012)	Douglas Brinkley	George Guidall	HarperAudio
2013 18th	Lady Almina and the Real Downton Abbey (2011)	Fiona Aitken, Lady Carnarvon	Wanda McCaddon	Tantor Audio
2013 18th	My Cross to Bear (2012)	Gregg Allman and Alan Light	Will Patton	HarperAudio
2013 18th	Two Rings: A Story of Love and War (2012)	Millie Werber and Eve Keller	Yelena Shmulenson and Eve Keller	HighBridge Audio
2014 19th	The Elephant Whisperer (2009)	Lawrence Anthony and Graham Spence	Simon Vance	Tantor Audio
2014 19th	[sic]: A Memoir (2011)	Joshua Cody	Edoardo Ballerini	Audible
2014 19th	My Beloved World (1992)	Sonia Sotomayor	Rita Moreno	Random House Audio/Books on Tape
2014 19th	World on a String (2012)	John Pizzarelli	Joseph Cosgriff	Audible
2014 19th	I Am Malala (2013)	Malala Yousafzai	Archie Panjabi	Hachette Audio
