= Audie Award for Best Female Narrator =

- Awarded for: Excellence in audiobook narration by a woman
- Sponsored by: Audio Publishers Association (APA)
- Date: Annually
- First award: 1998

The Audie Award for Best Female Narrator is one of the Audie Awards presented annually by the Audio Publishers Association (APA). It awards excellence in audiobook narration by a woman released in a given year. Before 2016 the award was given as the Audie Award for Female Solo Narration. It has been awarded since 1998, when it superseded the Audie Award for Solo Narration. The award was disestablished in 2024, at which point it was replaced by the Audie Awards for Best Fiction and Non-Fiction Narrator.

== Winners and finalists ==
=== 1990s ===
Year	Title	Author	Narrator(s)	Publisher	Result	Ref.
1998 3rd	Land Girls (1995)	Angela Huth	Carole Boyd	Isis Publishing	Winner	
1998 3rd	Sin (1992)	Josephine Hart	Diana Rigg	Dove Audio	Finalist	
1998 3rd	To the Lighthouse (1927)	Virginia Woolf	Eileen Atkins	Penguin Audiobooks	Finalist	
1999 4th	Oliver Twist (1837–1839)	Charles Dickens	Miriam Margolyes	The Audio Partners Publishing Corp.	Winner	
1999 4th	Black Coffee (1930)	Agatha Christie	Alexandra Thomas	Soundelux Audio Publishing	Finalist	
1999 4th	Pride and Prejudice (1813)	Jane Austen	Irene Sutcliffe	The Audio Partners Publishing Corp.	Finalist	

=== 2000s ===
Year	Title	Author	Narrator(s)	Publisher	Result	Ref.
2000 5th	Bridget Jones's Diary (1996)	Helen Fielding	Barbara Rosenblat	Recorded Books, LLC	Winner	
2000 5th	Daughter of Fortune (1998)	Isabel Allende	Blair Brown	HarperAudio	Finalist	
2000 5th	These Is My Words (1998)	Nancy E. Turner	Valerie Leonard	Chivers North America	Finalist	
2001 6th	Their Eyes Were Watching God (1937)	Zora Neale Hurston	Ruby Dee	HarperAudio	Winner	
2001 6th	The Blind Assassin (2000)	Margaret Atwood	Margot Dionne	Bantam Doubleday Dell Audio	Finalist	
2001 6th	Winter Solstice (2000)	Rosamunde Pilcher	Lynn Redgrave	Bantam Doubleday Dell Audio	Finalist	
2002 7th	My Dream of You (2001)	Nuala O'Faolain	Dearbhla Molloy	Simon & Schuster Audio	Winner	
2002 7th	Lord of the Silent (2001)	Elizabeth Peters	Barbara Rosenblat	HarperAudio	Finalist	
2002 7th	Portrait in Sepia (2000)	Isabel Allende	Blair Brown	HarperAudio	Finalist	
2003 8th	Bronx Primitive: Portraits in a Childhood (1982)	Kate Simon	Barbara Rosenblat	Jewish Contemporary Classics, Inc.	Winner	
2003 8th	Breathing Room (2002)	Susan Elizabeth Phillips	Kate Fleming	Chivers North America	Finalist	
2003 8th	Divine Secrets of the Ya-Ya Sisterhood (1996)	Rebecca Wells	Judith Ivey	HarperAudio	Finalist	
2003 8th	Quentins (2002)	Maeve Binchy	Terry Donnelly	Penguin Audiobooks	Finalist	
2003 8th	The Secret Life of Bees (2001)	Sue Monk Kidd	Jenna Lamia	HighBridge Audio	Finalist	
2004 9th	The Nazi Officer's Wife (1999)	Edith Hahn Beer	Barbara Rosenblat	Jewish Contemporary Classics, Inc.	Winner	
2004 9th	A Corner of the Universe (2002)	Ann M. Martin	Judith Ivey	Listening Library	Finalist	
2004 9th	Blow Fly (2003)	Patricia Cornwell	Kate Reading	Putnam Berkley Audio/Books on Tape	Finalist	
2004 9th	Inkheart (2003)	Cornelia Funke	Lynn Redgrave	Listening Library	Finalist	
2004 9th	Stuffed (2001)	Patricia Volk	Barbara Rosenblat	Blackstone Audio	Finalist	
2005 10th	The Full Cupboard of Life (2003)	Alexander McCall Smith	Lisette Lecat	Recorded Books, LLC	Winner	
2005 10th	Destination Unknown (1954)	Agatha Christie	Emilia Fox	The Audio Partners Publishing Corp.	Finalist	
2005 10th	A Fugue in Hell's Kitchen (2004)	Hal Glazer	Barbara Rosenblat	Audio-Playwrights	Finalist	
2005 10th	When We Were Very Young (1924)	A. A. Milne	Miranda Richardson	HarperAudio	Finalist	
2005 10th	Now We Are Six (1927)	A. A. Milne	Miranda Richardson	HarperAudio	Finalist	
2005 10th	Yada Yada Prayer Group Gets Down (2003)	Neta Jackson	Barbara Rosenblat	Oasis Audio	Finalist	
2006 11th	A Breath of Snow and Ashes (2005)	Diana Gabaldon	Davina Porter	Recorded Books, LLC	Winner	
2006 11th	The Ice Queen (2005)	Alice Hoffman	Nancy Travis	Time Warner AudioBooks	Finalist	
2006 11th	Last Days of Dogtown (2005)	Anita Diamant	Kate Nelligan	Simon & Schuster Audio	Finalist	
2006 11th	Pretty Birds (2005)	Scott Simon	Christina Moore	Recorded Books, LLC	Finalist	
2006 11th	Up from Orchard Street (2005)	Eleanor Widmer	Lorna Raver	Blackstone Audio	Finalist	
2007 12th	Telegraph Days (2006)	Larry McMurtry	Annie Potts	Simon & Schuster Audio	Winner	
2007 12th	Darkfever (2006)	Karen Marie Moning	Joyce Bean	Brilliance Audio	Finalist	
2007 12th	Fortunate Son (2006)	Walter Mosley	Lorraine Toussaint	Hachette Audio	Finalist	
2007 12th	Leave a Candle Burning (2006)	Lori Wick	Barbara Rosenblat	Oasis Audio	Finalist	
2007 12th	To Kill a Mockingbird (1960)	Harper Lee	Sissy Spacek	Harper Audio/Caedmon	Finalist	
2008 13th	Tallgrass (2008)	Sandra Dallas	Lorelei King	Macmillan Audio	Winner	
2008 13th	The Blood of Flowers (2007)	Anita Amirrezvani	Shohreh Aghdashloo	Hachette Audio	Finalist	
2008 13th	Boomsday (2007)	Christopher Buckley	Janeane Garofalo	Hachette Audio	Finalist	
2008 13th	Taking Flight (2009)	Adriana Sevahn Nichols	Adriana Sevahn Nichols	L.A. Theatre Works	Finalist	
2008 13th	The Teahouse Fire (2006)	Ellis Avery	Barbara Caruso	HighBridge Audio	Finalist	
2009 14th	Curse of the Blue Tattoo (2004)	L. A. Meyer	Katherine Kellgren	Listen & Live Audio	Winner	
2009 14th	Amarcord: Marcella Remembers (2008)	Marcella Hazan	Concetta Tomei	HarperAudio	Finalist	
2009 14th	The Age of Innocence (1920)	Edith Wharton	Lorna Raver	Blackstone Audio	Finalist	
2009 14th	The Lace Reader (2006)	Brunonia Barry	Alyssa Bresnahan	HarperAudio	Finalist	
2009 14th	The Palace of Illusions (2008)	Chitra Banerjee Divakaruni	Sneha Mathan	Blackstone Audio	Finalist	

=== 2010s ===
Year	Title	Author	Narrator(s)	Publisher	Result	Ref.
2010 15th	The Chosen One (2009)	Carol Lynch Williams	Jenna Lamia	Macmillan Audio	Winner	
2010 15th	In the Belly of the Bloodhound (2006)	L. A. Meyer	Katherine Kellgren	Listen & Live Audio	Finalist	
2010 15th	Mississippi Jack (2007)	L. A. Meyer	Katherine Kellgren	Listen & Live Audio	Finalist	
2010 15th	Washington Square (1880)	Henry James	Lorna Raver	Tantor Audio	Finalist	
2010 15th	Fatally Flaky (2009)	Diane Mott Davidson	Barbara Rosenblat	HarperAudio	Finalist	
2011 16th	Glorious (2010)	Bernice McFadden	Alfre Woodard	Audible	Winner	
2011 16th	The Invisible Order (2010)	Paul Crilley	Katherine Kellgren	Audible	Finalist	
2011 16th	The Magician's Elephant (2009)	Kate DiCamillo	Juliet Stevenson	Brilliance Audio	Finalist	
2011 16th	Rapture of the Deep: Being an Account of the Further Adventures of Jacky Faber, Soldier, Sailor, Mermaid, Spy (2009)	L. A. Meyer	Katherine Kellgren	Listen & Live Audio	Finalist	
2011 16th	The Golden Notebook (1962)	Doris Lessing	Juliet Stevenson	Naxos AudioBooks	Finalist	
2011 16th	Spoken from the Heart (2010)	Laura Bush	Laura Bush	Simon & Schuster Audio	Finalist	
2012 17th	The Winter Sea (2008)	Susanna Kearsley	Rosalyn Landor	Audible	Winner	
2012 17th	Ashes Trilogy: Ashes (2011)	Ilsa J. Bick	Katherine Kellgren	Audible/Brilliance Audio	Finalist	
2012 17th	First Grave on the Right (2011)	Darynda Jones	Lorelei King	Macmillan Audio	Finalist	
2012 17th	Loretta Lynn: Coal Miner's Daughter (1976)	Loretta Lynn and George Vecsey	Sissy Spacek	Random House Audio/Books on Tape	Finalist	
2012 17th	The Wake of the Lorelei Lee (2010)	L. A. Meyer	Katherine Kellgren	Listen & Live Audio	Finalist	
2013 18th	The Boy in the Suitcase (2011)	Lene Kaaberbøl and Agnete Friis	Katherine Kellgren	AudioGO	Winner	
2013 18th	Call the Midwife: A True Story of the East End in the 1950s (2002)	Jennifer Worth	Nicola Barber	HighBridge Audio	Finalist	
2013 18th	The Incorrigible Children of Ashton Place (2012)	Maryrose Wood	Katherine Kellgren	HarperAudio	Finalist	
2013 18th	Juliet in August / Cool Water (2010)	Dianne Warren	Cassandra Campbell	Tantor Audio	Finalist	
2013 18th	The Wonderful Wizard of Oz (1900)	L. Frank Baum	Anne Hathaway	Audible	Finalist	
2014 19th	The Twelve Clues of Christmas (2012)	Rhys Bowen	Katherine Kellgren	Audible	Winner	
2014 19th	Heartburn (1983)	Nora Ephron	Meryl Streep	Random House Audio/Books on Tape	Finalist	
2014 19th	My Beloved World (2013)	Sonia Sotomayor	Rita Moreno	Random House Audio/Books on Tape	Finalist	
2014 19th	NOS4A2 (2013)	Joe Hill	Kate Mulgrew	HarperAudio	Finalist	
2014 19th	The Testament of Mary (2012)	Colm Tóibín	Meryl Streep	Simon & Schuster Audio	Finalist	
2015 20th	Yellow Crocus (2010)	Laila Ibrahim	Bahni Turpin	Brilliance Audio	Winner	
2015 20th	Boston Jacky (2013)	L. A. Meyer	Katherine Kellgren	Listen & Live Audio	Finalist	
2015 20th	Life Drawing (2014)	Robin Black	Cassandra Campbell	Penguin Random House Audio	Finalist	
2015 20th	Murphy's Law (2001)	Rhys Bowen	Nicola Barber	Audible	Finalist	
2015 20th	Until the End of the World (2013)	Sarah Lyons Fleming	Julia Whelan	Podium Publishing	Finalist	
2015 20th	Written in My Own Heart's Blood (2014)	Diana Gabaldon	Davina Porter	Recorded Books	Finalist	
2016 21st	Wild Rover No More (2014)	L. A. Meyer	Katherine Kellgren	Listen & Live Audio	Winner	
2016 21st	All the Stars in the Heavens (2015)	Adriana Trigiani	Blair Brown	HarperAudio	Finalist	
2016 21st	The Boston Girl (2014)	Anita Diamant	Linda Lavin	Simon & Schuster Audio	Finalist	
2016 21st	Lair of Dreams (2015)	Libba Bray	January LaVoy	Listening Library/Penguin Random House Audio	Finalist	
2016 21st	The Lost Landscape (2015)	Joyce Carol Oates	Cassandra Campbell	HarperAudio	Finalist	
2016 21st	The Nightingale (2015)	Kristin Hannah	Polly Stone	Macmillan Audio	Finalist	
2017 22nd	Be Frank with Me (2016)	Julia Claiborne Johnson	Tavia Gilbert	HarperAudio	Winner	
2017 22nd	Another Brooklyn (2016)	Jacqueline Woodson	Robin Miles	HarperAudio	Finalist	
2017 22nd	The Little Red Chairs (2015)	Edna O'Brien	Juliet Stevenson	Hachette Audio	Finalist	
2017 22nd	The Turn of the Screw (1898)	Henry James	Emma Thompson	Audible	Finalist	
2017 22nd	The Underground Railroad (2016)	Colson Whitehead	Bahni Turpin	Penguin Random House Audio/Books on Tape	Finalist	
2018 23rd	The Hate U Give (2017)	Angie Thomas	Bahni Turpin	HarperAudio	Winner	
2018 23rd	The Alice Network (2017)	Kate Quinn	Saskia Maarleveld	HarperAudio	Finalist	
2018 23rd	Anne of Green Gables (1908)	Lucy Maud Montgomery	Rachel McAdams	Audible	Finalist	
2018 23rd	The Secret Diary of Laura Palmer (1990)	Jennifer Lynch	Sheryl Lee	Audible	Finalist	
2018 23rd	The Stone Sky (2017)	N. K. Jemisin	Robin Miles	Hachette Audio	Finalist	
2019 24th	Educated	Tara Westover	Julia Whelan	Penguin Random House Audio	Winner	
2019 24th	Barracoon	Zora Neale Hurston	Robin Miles	HarperAudio	Finalist	
2019 24th	Girls & Boys	Dennis Kelly	Carey Mulligan	Audible Studios	Finalist	
2019 24th	The Mermaid and Mrs. Hancock	Imogen Hermes Gowar	Juliet Stevenson	HarperAudio	Finalist	
2019 24th	Transcription	Kate Atkinson	Fenella Woolgar	Hachette Audio	Finalist	

=== 2020s ===
Year	Title	Author	Narrator(s)	Publisher	Result	Ref.
2020 25th	Nothing to See Here (2019)	Kevin Wilson	Marin Ireland	HarperAudio	Winner	
2020 25th	All the Lost Things (2019)	Michelle Sacks	Cassandra Morris	Hachette Audio	Finalist	
2020 25th	The Boy (2018)	Tami Hoag	Hillary Huber	Brilliance Audio	Finalist	
2020 25th	Prime Suspect (1991)	Lynda La Plante	Rachel Atkins	Zaffle	Finalist	
2020 25th	The Ten Thousand Doors of January (2019)	Alix E. Harrow	January LaVoy	Hachette Audio	Finalist	
2021 26th	The City We Became (2020)	N. K. Jemisin	Robin Miles	Hachette Audio	Winner	
2021 26th	The Color Purple (1982)	Alice Walker	Samira Wiley	Audible	Finalist	
2021 26th	The Lying Life of Adults (2019)	Elena Ferrante with Ann Goldstein (trans.)	Marisa Tomei	Penguin Random House Audio	Finalist	
2021 26th	One by One (2020)	Ruth Ware	Imogen Church	Simon & Schuster Audio	Finalist	
2021 26th	Such a Fun Age (2019)	Kiley Reid	Nicole Lewis	Penguin Random House Audio	Finalist	
2022 27th	The Parted Earth	Anjali Enjeti	Deepti Gupta	Novel audio	Winner	
2022 27th	Before She Disappeared	Lisa Gardner	Hillary Huber	Brilliance Publishing	Finalist	
2022 27th	The Four Winds	Kristin Hannah	Julia Whelan	Macmillan Audio	Finalist	
2022 27th	The Morning After	Lisa Jackson	Natalie Naudus	Brilliance Publishing	Finalist	
2022 27th	Wild Swan: A Story of Florence Nightingale	Patti Callahan	Cynthia Erivo	Audible	Finalist	
2023 27th	The Eye of the World (1990)	Robert Jordan	Rosamund Pike	Macmillan Audio	Winner	
2023 27th	Nightcrawling (2022)	Leila Mottley	Joniece Abbott-Pratt	Penguin Random House Audio	Finalist	
2023 27th	Thistlefoot	GennaRose Nethercott	January LaVoy	Penguin Random House Audio	Finalist	
2023 27th	NSFW	Isabel Kaplan	Stephanie Nemeth-Parker	Macmillan Audio	Finalist	
2023 27th	War and Peace (1869)	Leo Tolstoy, trans. by Aylmer and Louise Maude	Thandiwe Newton	Audible Studios	Finalist	
