= Barbara Rosenblat =

British actress (born 1950)

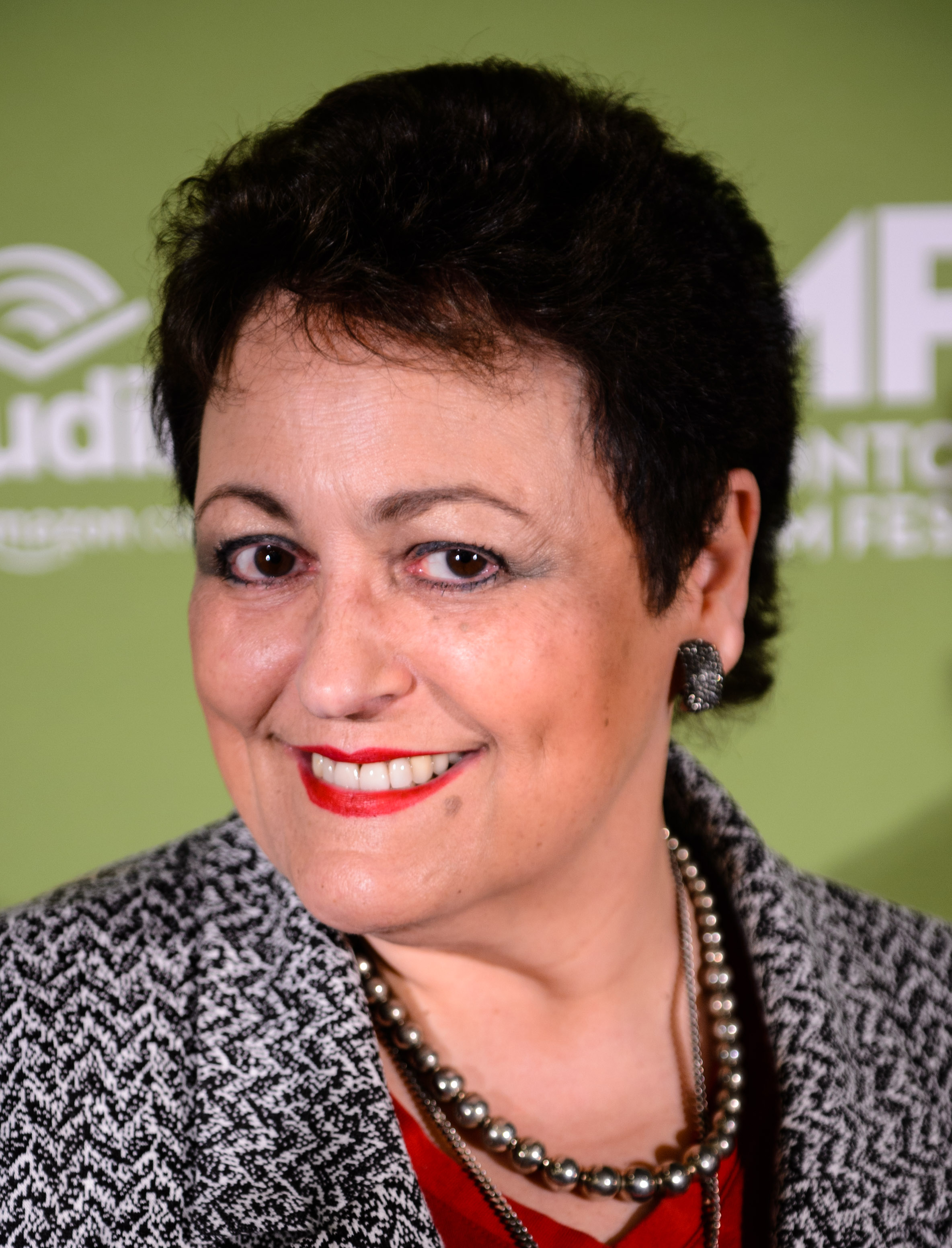
Barbara Rosenblat in 2015

Barbara Rosenblat (born 17 July 1950) is a British actress. She is best known as a prolific narrator of audiobooks, for which AudioFile named her a Golden Voice. She has also appeared on screen such as in the Netflix original series Orange Is the New Black as the character Miss Rosa.

== Early life ==
Rosenblat was born in London, England and was raised in New York City in a Jewish family. She attended a Hebrew school as a child.

== Career ==
After returning to London for a family wedding, Rosenblat decided to stay in England. Soon afterwards, she landed a part in a production of Godspell. She continued to work in theatre, as well as various fields of entertainment in the UK such as radio, film and television.

She later returned to the US, and worked at the Library of Congress narrating books for the blind for four years.

On Broadway, she appeared in the musical The Secret Garden and the play Talk Radio.

== Awards and honors ==
AudioFile has named Rosenblat a Golden Voice narrator.

=== Awards ===
Year	Title	Award	Result	Ref.
1996	Myst: The Book of Atrus by Rand and Robyn Miller with David Wingrove	Audie Award for Multi-Voiced Performance	Winner	
2000	Bridget Jones' Diary by Helen Fielding	Audie Award for Solo Narration - Female	Winner	
2001	Moment of Truth by Lisa Scottoline	Audie Award for Mystery, Fiction	Finalist	
2002	Lord of the Silent by Elizabeth Peters	Audie Award for Solo Narration - Female	Finalist	
2002	The Vendetta Defense by Lisa Scottoline	Audie Award for Mystery, Fiction	Finalist	
2003	The Bone Vault (2003) by Linda Fairstein	Earphones Award	Winner	
2003	Bronx Primitive: Portraits in a Childhood by Kate Simon	Audie Award for Solo Narration - Female	Finalist	
2003	Jackdaws by Ken Follett	Audie Award for Fiction (Abridged)	Finalist	
2003	The Nazi Officer's Wife (1999) by Edith Hahn Beer	Listen Up Award for Narration (Female)	Finalist	
2003	A Yellow Raft in Blue Water by Michael Dorris	Listen Up Award for Fiction	Finalist	
2004	Guardian of the Horizon (2004) by Elizabeth Peters	Earphones Award	Winner	
2004	The Nazi Officer's Wife (1999) by Edith Hahn Beer	Audie Award for Biography or Memoir	Winner	
2004	The Nazi Officer's Wife (1999) by Edith Hahn Beer	Audie Award for Solo Narration - Female	Winner	
2004	Stuffed by Patricia Volk	Audie Award for Solo Narration - Female	Finalist	
2005	A Fugue in Hell's Kitchen by Hal Glazer	Audie Award for Solo Narration - Female	Finalist	
2005	The Serpent on the Crown (2005) by Elizabeth Peters	Earphones Award	Winner	
2005	The Yada Yada Prayer Group Gets Down by Neta Jackson	Audie Award for Inspirational/Faith-Based Fiction	Finalist	
2005	The Yada Yada Prayer Group Gets Down by Neta Jackson	Audie Award for Solo Narration - Female	Finalist	
2006	Just Above a Whisper by Lori Wick	Audie Award for Inspirational/Faith-Based Fiction	Finalist	
2006	One Dangerous Lady by Jane Stanton Hitchcock	Audie Award for Mystery (Fiction)	Finalist	
2006	Dirty Blonde by Lisa Scottoline	Listen Up Award for Mystery	Finalist	
2006	The Serpent on the Crown (2005) by Elizabeth Peters	Audie Award for Mystery (Fiction)	Winner	
2006	Suite Francaise by Irène Némirovsky	Listen Up Award for Fiction	Finalist	
2007	Away by Amy Bloom	Listen Up Award for Fiction	Finalist	
2007	Daddy's Girl by Lisa Scottoline	Listen Up Award for Mystery	Finalist	
2007	Leave a Candle Burning by Lori Wick	Audie Award for Solo Narration - Female	Finalist	
2007	Suite Francaise by Irène Némirovsky	Audie Award for Literary Fiction	Finalist	
2007	Suite Francaise by Irène Némirovsky	Audie Award for Multi-Voiced Performance	Finalist	
2008	Daddy's Girl by Lisa Scottoline	Audie Award for Thriller or Suspense	Finalist	
2008	Lady Killer (2008) by Lisa Scottoline	Earphones Award	Winner	
2008	The Laughter of Dead Kings(2008) by Elizabeth Peters	Earphones Award	Winner	
2009	The Elegance of the Hedgehog (2006) by Muriel Barbery with Alison Anderson (Trans.)	Listen Up Award for Fiction	Finalist	
2009	Fire Me Up by Katie MacAlister	Audie Award for Romance	Finalist	
2009	Lethal Legacy (2009) by Linda Fairstein	Earphones Award	Winner	
2010	Anne Frank Remembered by Miep Gies and Leslie Gold	Audie Award for Biography or Memoir	Winner	
2010	Anne Frank Remembered by Miep Gies and Leslie Gold	Audie Award for Nonfiction	Finalist	
2010	The Elegance of the Hedgehog (2006) by Muriel Barbery with Alison Anderson (Trans.)	Audie Award for Literary Fiction	Finalist	
2010	Fatally Flaky by Diane Mott Davidson	Audie Award for Solo Narration - Female	Finalist	
2010	Louise, the Adventures of a Chicken by Kate DiCamillo, illustrated by Harry Bliss	Audie Award for Children's Titles Up To Age 8	Winner	
2010	Louise, the Adventures of a Chicken by Kate DiCamillo, illustrated by Harry Bliss	Odyssey Award	Winner	
2010	A River in the Sky (2010) by Elizabeth Peters	Earphones Award	Winner	
2011	Judy Moody & Stink by Megan McDonald	Audie Award for Children's Titles Up To Age 8	Finalist	
2012	The Chalk Girl (2012) by Carol O'Connell	Earphones Award	Winner	
2012	The Collected Stories of Eudora Welty (1980) by Eudora Welty	Audie Award for Short Stories or Collections	Finalist	
2012	The Witches of Lublin by Ellen Kushner, Elizabeth Schwartz, and Yale Strom	Audie Award for Distinguished Achievement in Production	Finalist	
2012	The Witches of Lublin by Ellen Kushner, Elizabeth Schwartz, and Yale Strom	Audie Award for Original Work	Finalist	
2012	The Witches of Lublin by Ellen Kushner, Elizabeth Schwartz, and Yale Strom	Audie Award for Package Design	Finalist	
2013	The Chalk Girl (2012) by Carol O'Connell	Audie Award for Thriller or Suspense	Finalist	
2013	Death Angel (2013) by Linda Fairstein	Earphones Award	Winner	
2014	The Ballad of the Sad Café (1951) by Carson McCullers	Audie Award for Short Stories or Collections	Finalist	
2014	Stink and the Freaky Frog Freakout by Megan McDonald	Audie Award for Children's Titles Up To Age 8	Finalist	
2014	Unveiled by Francine Rivers	Audie Award for Faith-Based Fiction and Nonfiction	Finalist	
2015	Act of God (2015) by Jill Ciment	Earphones Award	Winner	
2015	The Swords of Riverside by Ellen Kushner and Delia Sherman	Audie Award for Audio Drama	Finalist	
2016	Clockwork Lives by Kevin J. Anderson and Neil Peart	Audie Award for Multi-Voiced Performance	Finalist	
2022	Bourdain by Laurie Woolever	Audie Award for Multi-Voiced Performance	Finalist	

=== "Best of" lists ===
Year	Title	Award	Ref.
2003	The Bone Vault (2003) by Linda Fairstein	AudioFile Best of Mystery & Suspense	
2004	Guardian of the Horizon (2004) by Elizabeth Peters	AudioFile Best of Mystery & Suspense	
2004	Guardian of the Horizon (2004) by Elizabeth Peters	Booklist Editors' Choice: Media	
2004	A Yellow Raft in Blue Water by Michael Dorris	Selected Audiobooks for Young Adults	
2005	Let Me Go by Helga Schneider	Booklist Editors' Choice: Media	
2006	Suite Francaise by Irène Némirovsky	Booklist Editors' Choice: Media	
2008	Lady Killer (2008) by Lisa Scottoline	AudioFile Best of Mystery & Suspense	
2008	Lady Killer (2008) by Lisa Scottoline	Booklist Editors' Choice: Media	
2008	The Laughter of Dead Kings(2008) by Elizabeth Peters	AudioFile Best of Mystery & Suspense	
2008	Winter Study (2008) by Nevada Barr	AudioFile Best of Mystery & Suspense	
2009	Anne Frank Remembered by Miep Gies and Leslie Gold	Booklist Editors' Choice: Media	
2009	Dear America: My Secret War (2000) by Mary Pope Osborne	AudioFile Best of Children	
2009	The Elegance of the Hedgehog (2008) by Muriel Barbery with Alison Anderson (Trans.)	AudioFile Best of Fiction	
2009	Lethal Legacy (2009) by Linda Fairstein	AudioFile Best of Mystery & Suspense	
2010	206 Bones (2009) by Kathy Reichs	AudioFile Best of Mystery & Suspense	
2010	Louise, the Adventures of a Chicken by Kate DiCamillo, illustrated by Harry Bliss	Notable Children's Recordings	
2010	A River in the Sky (2010) by Elizabeth Peters	AudioFile Best of Mystery & Suspense	
2011	Silent Mercy (2011) by Linda Fairstein	AudioFile Best of Mystery & Suspense	
2011	Crunch Time (2011) by Diane Mott Davidson	AudioFile Best of Mystery & Suspense	
2012	The Chalk Girl (2012) by Carol O'Connell	AudioFile Best of Mystery & Suspense	
2013	The Chalk Girl (2012) by Carol O'Connell	RUSA Listen List	
2013	Death Angel (2013) by Linda Fairstein	AudioFile Best of Mystery & Suspense	
2014	A Full Moon Is Rising (2013) by Marilyn Singer	Notable Children's Recordings	
2015	Act of God (2015) by Jill Ciment	AudioFile Best of Fiction	

== Audiography ==
Rosenblat has narrated more than 400 audiobooks and has been praised for her range of performance in both British and American English accents. She has also narrated a vast range of books across various genres, from classics such as Lewis Carroll’s Alice in Wonderland to the literary fiction of T. C. Boyle or short stories of Kurt Vonnegut to paranormal romance novels by Katie McAllister.

Rosenblat is known for her narrations of well-loved mystery series such as Dorothy Gilman’s Mrs. Pollifax series, Elizabeth Peters‘s Amelia Peabody series, and continues to carry many long-running contemporary crime fiction series including:

- Kathy Reich’s Temperance Brennen series
- Nevada Barr’s Anna Pigeon series
- Diane Mott Davidson’s Goldy Schultz series
- Linda Fairstein’s Alexandra Cooper series
- Lisa Scottoline’s Rosato & Associates series
- Jeffery Deaver’s Lincoln Rhyme series
- Laura Lippman’s Tess Monaghan series
- Carol O’Connell’s Kathleen Mallory series
- Jessica Ellicott’s Beryl and Edwina Mystery series

== Filmography ==
=== Film ===
Year	Title	Role	Notes
1976	Carry on England	A.T.S.	
1985	Turtle Diary	American Woman	
1986	The American Way	Betsey Blankett	
1986	Haunted Honeymoon	Reporter	
1986	Little Shop of Horrors	Fifth Customer	
1990	The Care of Time	Barbara	TV movie
1997	Malcolm and Melvin	Mother (voice)	Short film
1997	Babe, He Calls Me	Mother (voice)	Short film
2009	Love Is Deaf	Subway Lady	Short film
2016	Stranded at the Altar	Joan the Shopkeeper	Short film
2016	For I Must Hold My Tongue	Diane	Short film
2017	Lost Cat Corona	Connie's Mom	
2018	Run	Maria	
2019	Anya	Dr. Rosalind Pfenning	
2019	MAD?	Judy	
2019	Weathering with You	Mrs. Mamiya, Fortune Teller (voices)	
2023	The Boy and the Heron	Utako (voice)	
2027	Hidden Dragon	Madame Golden Claw (voice)	

=== Television ===
Year	Title	Role	Notes
1976–1981	The Dick Emery Show	Mrs. Goldberg	2 episodes
1982	Play for Today	Rosie	Episode: "Under the Skin"
1982	Never the Twain	Mrs. Hardy	Episode: "A Woman's Place..."
1983	Luna	2B2B	Episode: "All the World's a Teletalk Linkup"
1983	Philip Marlowe, Private Eye	Lady Columnist	Episode: "Smart Alek Kill"
1984	Tales of the Unexpected	TV Interviewer	Episode: "Have a Nice Death"
1989	Anything More Would Be Greedy	Fran Dehring	3 episodes Mini TV series
1997	The Cartoon Cartoon Show	Mother (voice)	2 episodes
2000	Hooked: Illegal Drugs & How They Got That Way	Narrator	4 episodes
2005	Law & Order: Special Victims Unit	Nurse	Episode: "Rage"
2008	Click and Clack's As the Wrench Turns	Sal (voice)	Episode: "Campaign"
2009	Law & Order: Special Victims Unit	Selma Peters	Episode: "Transitions"
2013–2015	Orange Is the New Black	Miss Rosa	14 episodes Screen Actors Guild Award for Outstanding Performance by an Ensemble in a Comedy Series
2014	Girls	Nurse	Episode: "Flo"
2014	Veep	Diane Appleby	Episode: "New Hampshire"
2015	Gotham	Lidia Bicchieri	2 episodes
2015	Benders	Helga	Episode: "Secrets and Lies"
2015	Limitless	Loretta	Episode: "When Pirates Pirates Pirates"
2016	The Venture Bros.	Battleaxe (voice)	Episode: "Tanks for Nuthin"
2017	House of Cards	Louise Talbert	Episode: "Chapter 57"
2018	Homeland	Attorney General Hoberman	2 episodes
2018	The Looming Tower	Elaine Kaufman	2 episodes
2020	Social Distance	Connie	Episode: “You Gotta Ding-Dong Fling-Flong the Whole Narrative”
2019–2020	The Bug Diaries	Spider Mom, Bumblebee, Mrs. Water Bug (voices)	7 episodes
2022	Moon Knight	Forger	Episode: "The Friendly Type"
2022	Better Call Saul	Judge Samantha Small	Episode: "Saul Gone"
2023–2024	Synduality: Noir	Mam (voice)	24 episodes
2024	Lego Monkie Kid	Tortoise Guardian (voice)	Episode: “The Storm Within”

=== Video games ===
Year	Title	Role
2005	Grand Theft Auto: Liberty City Stories	DJ Reni Wassulmaier
2006	Grand Theft Auto: Vice City Stories	Reni Wassulmaier
2015	Just Cause 3	Rosa Manuela
2018	Pillars of Eternity II: Deadfire	Hazanui Karu
