= Here Comes Trouble =

Here Comes Trouble may refer to:

== Music ==
- Here Comes Trouble (Scatterbrain album) (1990)
- Here Comes Trouble (Bad Company album) (1992)
- Here Comes Trouble (The Eyeliners album) (2000)
- Here Comes Trouble (Ian McLagan album) (2005)

== Other uses ==
- Here Comes Trouble (1936 film), starring Paul Kelly, Arline Judge, and Mona Barrie
- Here Comes Trouble (1948 film), a comedy featuring Dodo Doubleday
- Here Comes Trouble: Stories from My Life, 2011 book by Michael Moore

== See also ==
- Oh No! Here Comes Trouble, 2023 Taiwanese television series
