= Christa Beran =

Christa Beran, originally Christa Denner (1922–1992), was an Austrian Christian who was awarded the title “Righteous Among The Nations” for helping a Jewish woman (Edith Hahn) survive the Holocaust.

== Life ==
Beran was born Christa Denner in Vienna, Austria, in 1922.

In June 1942, Denner's Jewish neighbour Edith Hahn Beer was ordered to report to the Gestapo. Knowing that Hahn was likely to be deported to a concentration camp, Denner and some friends sheltered her in different hiding places. As time progressed, however, the group found it increasingly difficult to provide food for Hahn, and a plan was devised for helping her escape from Vienna: in July 1942, Denner gave her own identity papers and food ration cards to Hahn, later reporting the documents lost to police. Hahn travelled to Germany under the name Christa Denner, eventually married a German, and managed to survive under her assumed identity until after the war ended.

Beran (née Denner) was recognized as one of the "Righteous Among The Nations" in 1985, and her name was added to a wall of honour in commemoration of her deeds.
