= Pretty Like Us =

Book written by Carol Lynch Williams

- First edition
- Author: Carol Lynch Williams
- Language: English
- Publisher: Peachtree Publishers
- Publication date: 2008
- ISBN: 978-1-56145-444-0 (first edition)
- LC Class: PZ7.W65588 Pr

Pretty Like Us is a book written by Carol Lynch Williams. It was published in 2008 by Peachtree Publishers. It is written in first person; Beauty McElwrath, a twelve-year-old girl, is the protagonist. The story is written in a southern country dialect and takes place in a small town in Florida.

== Plot summary ==
Beauty McElwrath dreads going back to school this year. She has no friends to speak of and her teacher is also her mother's boyfriend.

She dreads it even more when she meets Alane Shriver, who suffers from an aging disease. Beauty ends up making fun of her, in order to try to gain friends, just like people have made fun of Beauty in the past. She runs away from school twice to forget some of the mean things that she is willing to do in hopes of gaining friendship.

Her mother, grandmother, and teacher all encourage her to make friends with Alane, but Beauty fears the disapproval of her classmates. She must realize that she wants to be friends with Alane on her own. She eventually makes friends with Alane through an illegal midnight drive to the beach and an incident with a wild pig running into Beauty's mother's prized car. However, Beauty is embarrassed by being friends with Alane when they are at school and says she is sorry about her actions in front of the entire classroom in order to regain Alane's friendship.

Beauty's mother starts a restaurant, her dream for quite some time. Beauty works as a waitress to help out and earn some pocket money.

Meanwhile, Alane gets sick, and Beauty finds out that not only does Alane look very old, but her body itself also is very old and she is slowly dying. Beauty both finds and learns how to deal with losing her best friend; and Alane finally found a friend and fulfills her own dream by the end, with a little help.

== Character Descriptions ==
Beauty McElwrath: Beauty is from a family of strong women, and she is trying to live up to their expectations. She often falls short in her attempts to gain friends and popularity at school. She is very shy, secretly adventurous, and generally very kind. She occasionally still talks to her Great Granny Dorothy Lu Lu, who died when Beauty was a toddler.

Alane Shriver: Alane suffers from an aging disease called progeria, which ages her very quickly. She looks like she is in her seventies when she is only in the sixth grade. She is very brave, outgoing, and mature for her age. She is also looking for a friend she can't find.

Jamie Borget: Jamie is Beauty's teacher and is dating Nina, Beauty's mother. He is kind to everyone in his class and pushes Beauty to do the right thing, even if it goes against peer pressure. He wants to marry Nina but is waiting for the entire family to be ready for that change in relationship.

Nina McElwrath / Momma: Nina, Beauty's mother, is strong and used to working with the little she was given in life. She has worked for most of Beauty's life as a mechanic, which is not a job that is approved for a woman in her small hometown. Her dream is to own her own restaurant and she has been working toward that goal for a long time. She had Beauty when she was thirteen years old and is only twenty-six in the story. The most important people in her life are her mother and daughter, with her boyfriend taking a less important place after her family's needs.

Maggie McElwrath / Grandma: Maggie is a very independent person and although she is Beauty's grandmother, she is only in her forties. She is very quirky and says what she thinks. She acts as a disciplinarian to Beauty when she gets into trouble, which happens quite a few times.

Great Granny Dorothy Lu Lu McElwrath: Great Granny Dorothy Lu Lu died saving Beauty from drowning when she was a toddler. Beauty looks like her and she seems to be the woman that Beauty models herself after. Great Granny Lu Lu's spirit saves Beauty and Alane when they are in trouble again. She is the person that would say "Pretty is as pretty diz," which is the family motto of the McElwrath's.

Cody Nelson: Cody was Beauty's friend for years, until the summer before sixth grade. He now hangs out with the popular crowd at school, ignoring and making fun of Beauty.

== Themes ==
Friendship: Beauty and Alane's relationship shows that true friendship can form despite issues preventing it. A lack of friendship is seen between the two girls and many of their classmates

Inner Beauty: An important quote in this story is "Pretty is as pretty diz." This means that inner beauty will show through as outer beauty and is much more important than being traditionally beautiful. This is shown through the character of Alane. The novel also suggests that Beauty is learning to follow this motto more and will grow into a strong woman like her mother and grandmother.

Death and Dying: Alane is slowly dying, and she must deal with the fact that her life is ending after only twelve or thirteen years when most people live much longer. Beauty also deals with the death of her Great Granny Dorothy Lu Lu, learning that no one blames her for her great-grandmother's death. Beauty also deals with the impending death of her best friend, Alane.

== Reception ==
Four different professional reviewing sources gave the novel mixed reviews. None of the sources gave the novel a negative review, but some were more critical than others. One source said that "Some of Beauty's behavior is inconsistent [and] Alane's character is better developed." (Horn Book) Another review took a completely different approach and says that Beauty's "voice is consistent and easy to believe. She is as moody and self-conscious as any girl her age. Readers will relate to her struggles to "fit in" while struggling to be true to herself. Alane is less believable. She has social graces far beyond her years, and readers never see her struggle." (School Library Journal) Yet another review states that "Williams demonstrates strong insight into the sixth-grade mind." (Kirkus) However, all of the sources appear to agree that the story is interesting and touching. It is described as a "lovely story that will reach many middle-school girls." (Kirkus)
