= The Showman =

2024 biography of Volodymyr Zelenskyy by Simon Shuster

The Showman: Inside the Invasion That Shook the World and Made a Leader of Volodymyr Zelensky
- Author: Simon Shuster
- Language: English
- Genre: Nonfiction
- Publisher: William Morrow, an imprint of HarperCollins
- Publication date: 2024-01-23
- Publication place: United States
- Media type: Hardback
- Pages: 384 pages
- ISBN: 0-0633-0742-1

The Showman: Inside the Invasion That Shook the World and Made a Leader of Volodymyr Zelensky is a non-fiction book written by Time magazine journalist Simon Shuster, released on January 23, 2024 by William Morrow. The book examines Ukrainian President Volodymyr Zelenskyy's transformation into a wartime leader during Russia's invasion of Ukraine in 2022.

== Reception ==
After its release, The Showman became a bestseller. The Wall Street Journal lauded the book as "the standard by which all other works on Mr. Zelenskyy and Ukraine's wartime politics will be judged," while The Guardian called it "a definitive, thoroughly researched, and deeply insightful biography."

Kate Tsurkan from The Kyiv Independent critiqued aspects of the book, suggesting that some passages—and Shuster’s earlier articles for Time on Russia’s war against Ukraine—tended towards sensationalism.

The book was banned in Russia as part of government censorship regarding Russia's invasion of Ukraine.
