= Toby Lester =

American journalist, scholar and author (born 1964)

Toby Lester (born November 2, 1964) is an American journalist, scholar and author. He received attention after writing two nonfiction works on the role of maps in the discovery of America and on Leonardo da Vinci's drawing of the Vitruvian Man.

== Biography ==
Toby Lester is the son of James Lester and Valerie Browne Lester and the brother of Alison Lester, all of whom are writers. Lester studied English and French at the University of Virginia, which he graduated from in 1987. He has worked as a refugee affairs officer for the United Nations, has helped with programmes in eastern Europe and the former Soviet Union, and has undertaken Peace Corps work in Yemen. From 1995 to 2005, he worked for the American magazine The Atlantic in various capacities, including managing editor, and has contributed to several other journals. Topics of interest have included the reconstruction of ancient Greek music, the Qur'an and alphabets in Azerbaijan. Lester lives near Boston with his wife and three daughters.

== Literary works ==
Lester has written two widely reviewed works of nonfiction. The Fourth Part of the World (2009) investigates the role of the 15th century map compiled by the German cartographer Martin Waldseemüller in the early years of exploration to the New World. He also looks at its place in the history of map-making from the days of the second-century Greek-Egyptian geographer Ptolemy and his treatise on geography.

His second book, Da Vinci's Ghost (2011), tells the story of the Vitruvian Man, Leonardo da Vinci's well-known drawing of a man inside a circle and a square. He explains how, in the first century BC, Vitruvius based his understanding of architecture on the principle that it should conform to the "members of a well-shaped man" and that it depended on squares and circles. Lester explores the relationships between Vitruvius' emperor Augustus and both Christ and God, explaining how geographical regions were considered to have been conceived within the embrace of figures symbolizing Christ or Adam. He also traces the part played by Arab scholars of science and medicine who continued to reveal classical texts at a time when western scholars considered them to be ungodly.

== Bibliography ==
- "New-alphabet disease? It's tough suddenly changing from one alphabet to another. Azerbaijan is on its third one this century". Notes & Comment. The Atlantic Monthly. 280 (1): 20–27. July 1997.
- The Fourth Part of the World (2009)
- Da Vinci's Ghost (2011)
