= Carol Lynch Williams =

American novelist

- Born: 1959 (age 66–67); Lincoln, Nebraska, U.S.
- Occupation: Novelist

Academic background
- Education: Vermont College of Fine Arts

Carol Lynch Williams is an author of Young Adult and Middle Grade novels. As of 2016, Williams is the conference director for Writing and Illustrating for Young Readers (WIFYR) conference and is a professor of creative writing at Brigham Young University (BYU). She graduated in 2008 from Vermont College of Fine Arts with a degree in Writing for Children and Young Adults.

== Personal ==
Williams has six daughters and a son. Williams grew up in Florida but currently lives in Utah.

== Overall themes and response ==
Williams read as part of the English Department reading series in the fall of 2008. John Bennion noted about that her characters "return love for cruelty." Williams' characters have to deal with abuse, aging, death, suicide, and other difficult challenges, yet rise above all of these difficulties. Bennion remarked, "we identify with her young women adults because they come out independent, relying on themselves." Williams' work has also been praised as "Intensely gripping and grippingly intense", "absorbing", "outstanding", and "stunning, gut-punching, heart-wrenching, heart-healing."

== Awards ==
- Winner, AML Award 2001 Middle Grade Novel: My Angelica
- Winner, Whitney Award Best Youth Fiction and AML Award 2009 Young Adult Novel: The Chosen One

A complete list of Williams' awards can be found on her blog.

== Published works ==
=== Middle Grade ===
- Kelly and Me
- The True Colors of Caitlynne Jackson
- Adeline Street
- Pretty Like Us
- I forget, you remember
- A Mother to Embarrass Me
- Just in Time series

=== Young Adult ===
- Never Said
- The Haven
- Signed, Skye Harper
- The Chosen One
- Miles from Ordinary
- Waiting
- Glimpse
- My Angelica
- Carolina Autumn

=== Non-fiction ===
- Sister, Sister: A Book of Activities Sisters Can Do Together

=== Latter-Day Daughters ===
- Victoria's Courage
- Sarah's Quest
- Marciea's Melody
- Laurel's flight
- Esther's Celebration
- Caroline's Secret
- Catherine's Remembrance
- Anna's gift

=== Other Latter-Day Saint Fiction ===
- Walk to Hope
- Laura's Box of Treasures
