= The Chosen One (novel) =

2009 young adult novel by Carol Lynch Williams

- Author: Carol Lynch Williams
- Language: English
- Genre: Young adult Realistic fiction Religion; Romance
- Publisher: St. Martin's Press
- Publication date: May 12, 2009
- Publication place: United States
- Media type: Hardcover
- Pages: 213
- ISBN: 0312555113

The Chosen One is a young adult novel written by Carol Lynch Williams. It was published on May 12, 2009 by St. Martin's Press. The story is told from the perspective of Kyra Carlson, the protagonist, and focuses on how she deals with living in a polygamist society.

== Plot ==
Kyra Carlson is a thirteen year-old girl who has grown up in an isolated community. She has always ignored the fact that her father has three wives, and that she has twenty-one siblings, and two more on the way. The people of the community follow the rules and commands of The Prophet, believing that he is the son of God Himself. However, Kyra has many secrets that she has hidden from her family; she secretly reads books that she borrows from a mobile library (even though reading is forbidden) and she has been secretly romancing with a boy named Joshua (even though a man is supposed to be chosen for her). One day, while The Prophet is eating dinner with the Carlson family, he announces that Kyra shall marry her sixty-year-old Uncle Hyrum, who already has six wives. Kyra rebels, as she is in love with Joshua, but her family is unable to help her. When the two young lovers plead with The Prophet, he has them both whipped and abused. Kyra then enlists the help of Patrick, the owner of the mobile library. Patrick tries to help her escape from the community, but he is shot and killed, while Kyra is dragged back and abused once more. Since The Prophet had ordered for Joshua to be banished from the community and left to die (since he is a "culprit"), Joshua escapes the community with two other boys after telling Kyra that he will come looking for her later. In her demise, Kyra tries to escape once more and has almost gotten away when she notices the sheriff chasing her. She calls the police and help arrives. Kyra is sent to live with a mother and daughter that reside somewhere outside the community. The book ends with Kyra missing her family and hoping that she will soon reunite with Joshua.

== Characters ==
- Kyra Leigh Carlson is the main protagonist. She is thirteen years old, has blond hair, and is the daughter of Sarah and Richard.
- Mother Victoria is the first wife of Richard. She is rather disciplined and strict.
- Mother Claire is the second wife of Richard.
- Mother Sarah is the third wife of Richard and is Kyra's mother.
- Hyrum is Richard's older brother and the man Kyra is engaged to. He is an apostle, and he is known to severely discipline his six wives and unknown number of children.
- Joshua is Kyra’s secret boyfriend.
- Patrick is the driver of the Ironton County Books on Wheels and helps Kyra escape.
- Prophet Childs is the abusive prophet of Kyra’s community.
- Laura is Kyra’s closet sister and best friend.

Kyra's siblings

- Adam
- Finn
- Emily
- Nathaniel
- Jackson
- Robert
- Laura
- Thomas
- Margaret
- Candice
- Abe
- April
- Christian
- Meadow
- Marie
- Ruth
- Carolina
- Trevor
- Foster
- Mariah
