= A Yellow Raft in Blue Water =

1987 novel by Michael Dorris

- 1st US paperback edition
- Author: Michael Dorris
- Language: English
- Genre: Novel
- Publisher: Henry Holt & Co
- Publication date: May 1987
- Publication place: United States
- Media type: Print (hardback & paperback)
- Pages: 343 pp (hardback edition)
- ISBN: 0-8050-0045-3 (hardback edition)
- OCLC: 14519855
- Dewey Decimal: 813/.54 19
- LC Class: PS3554.O695 Y4 1987

A Yellow Raft in Blue Water is the debut novel of author Michael Dorris, published in 1987. It was published by Henry Holt & Co in the United States and Canada. Although the novel is credited to Dorris alone, his wife, the novelist and poet Louise Erdrich, contributed significantly to its writing and editing. This was the couple’s regular practice at the time.

The novel tells the story of three generations of Native American women: Rayona, who is half African-American, her mother Christine, and Christine's mother Aunt Ida. The story is told in three distinct sections, one narrated by each woman and beginning in the year each one turns 15. The novel examines themes of native and American identity, family, community, and coming of age.

== Plot ==
=== Rayona ===
Rayona, a 15-year-old girl of mixed Native American and African-American ancestry visits her mother, Christine, in the hospital. After a typical falling out with Rayona's father, Elgin, Christine and Rayona end up driving away together, with Christine intent on committing suicide. Eventually, the two travel from Seattle to the home of Christine's mother, who she calls "Aunt Ida," on a reservation in Montana.

Christine abandons Rayona with Ida and Rayona settles into an uneasy routine with her grandmother and cousins, who mock her for her mixed race heritage. The Catholic priests in the area discover Rayona has moved in and convince her to join a youth group led by Father Tom.

Tom drives Rayona to the fictional "Bear Paw State Park" on the pretense of taking part in a youth jamboree. He has contrived to arrive a day before the event to be alone with Rayona. The two swim in the park's lake, Rayona rescues the priest from downing, and he sexually assaults her on a tethered raft.

To cover up what has happened, Tom pays for Rayona to take a train back to Seattle, but she decides not to go, eventually getting a job at the state park and moving in with a couple whom she befriends, Sky and Evelyn. She finds life with the two peaceful and eventually tells them her story.

On the fourth of July, the couple take Rayona to a nearby Indian Rodeo hoping to find Christine. Christine is not at the Rodeo, but Rayona does meet up with her cousin "Foxy", who is scheduled to ride in a bareback bronco riding competition. Foxy has gotten too drunk to ride, so Rayona dresses up in his clothes and makes three failed attempts to ride the horse, eventually winning a "tough luck" consolation prize. She then meets the horse's owner, Dayton, with whom Christine has, coincidentally, been staying.

=== Christine ===
Reunited with her daughter at Dayton's, Christine tells Rayona her life's story, commencing a flashback. 15-year-old Christine has a brother named Lee, who is the handsomest boy in town. Christine doubts that she and Lee have the same father, since Lee is gorgeous and Christine is not, but Aunt Ida won't tell them. Christine and Lee aren't allowed to call Aunt Ida "mom" because she tells them was never married and feels it's not right. Christine is attracted to her brother's friend Dayton. During the Vietnam War, Christine receives mail from Dayton saying Lee is Missing In Action.

Christine, that night, is at a bar where she meets Elgin, a soldier who promises to bring Lee back. Christine thinks she has finally found love, especially at first sight, but it is lust at first sight. Elgin and Christine conceive Rayona in Tacoma, and they soon get married. Not able to have sex with Christine was taxing on Elgin, and he is gone most of the time, always in and out of Christine's life. She finally leaves and goes to the reservation.

Christine finds out she had worn herself down with all the alcohol, and she only has six months to live.

Christine gets weaker and can handle only one task a day. Dayton fixed her old car and Christine and Dayton decided to teach Rayona how to drive. One day while Dayton and Rayona are at a stud appointment for their horse, Father Tom appears at the house and drops off a bottle of pain pills, but leaves quickly after Christine starts to say that Aunt Ida had mentioned something about him. Dayton comes back and describes the trouble he had with his horse at the stud: the horses had fallen in love and did not want to be separated. That afternoon Christine gives Rayona her prize silver ring as a gesture of reconciliation.

=== Ida ===
Ida's aunt Clara arrives on the reservation to help with Annie, Ida's sick mother. Ida and her sister Pauline are excited to have a sophisticated city girl in the house.

Clara gets pregnant with Lecon's baby (Lecon being Ida's father). Clara and Ida then move to a convent, and Ida promises to be the legal mother of Christine at the stunning age of 15. The nuns tell her to be called "Aunt Ida" instead of mother, since she and Christine are technically sisters.

Clara visits a few times, threatening to take Christine and put her up for adoption, but Ida refuses every time.

Several years later, Willard Pretty Dog, returns from the war. Willard was once the most attractive boy on the reservation, but is now rumored to be hideously deformed from combat injuries. Ida helps to take care of him, and then Ida gets pregnant with Willard's baby, with whom she names Lee. After Willard undergoes serious plastic surgery and is handsome as he was before, he tells his mother that "Ida may not be pretty or smart, but she was there for me when no one else was." Ida is heartbroken and breaks off the relationship between them.

Ida lives her life with Christine and Lee, revealing her favoritism towards Christine and her dislike for Lee, claiming he is whiny and always needs attention, contradictory to Christine's belief that Ida likes Lee more.

Christine and Ida on the roof of their house, awaiting the end of the world as predicted in a chain letter Christine received. Ida does not believe in the letter, but she is willing to humor Christine. The final lines describe Ida pantomiming the action of braiding, symbolizing the intertwining destinies of family.

== Characters in A Yellow Raft in Blue Water ==
- Rayona Diane Taylor – a main protagonist; daughter of Christine and Elgin
- Christine George Taylor – a main protagonist; mother of Rayona
- Aunt Ida George – a main protagonist; legal mother of Christine
- Elgin Taylor – Christine's (separated) husband; Rayona's father
- Lee George – Christine's brother
- Dayton Nickles – Lee's friend
- Father Hurlburt – priest at the reservation mission; Ida's close friend
- Father Tom Novak – assistant priest at the reservation mission.
- Pauline George Cree – Ida's sister
- Dale Cree – Pauline's husband; Foxy's father
- Polly Cree – Dale's mother
- Buster Cree – Dale's father
- Willard Pretty Dog – a reservation man and veteran; biological father of Lee
- Mrs. Pretty Dog – Willard's mother
- Kennedy "Foxy" Cree – Rayona's cousin; son of Pauline
- Annabelle Stiffarm – Foxy's girlfriend
- Clara – Annie's sister; Christine's biological mother
- Annie George – Ida and Pauline's mother; Lecon's wife
- Lecon George – Ida, Pauline, and Christine's father; Annie's husband
- Ellen DeMarco – lifeguard at Bearpaw Lake
- Mr. and Mrs. DeMarco – Ellen's parents
- Norman "Sky" Dial – owner of the Conoco gas station near Bearpaw Lake; husband of Evelyn Dial
- Evelyn Dial – chef at Bearpaw Lake; wife of Sky
- Charlene – Seattle pharmacist; Christine's friend and neighbor
- Mr. McCutcheon – Bearpaw Lake maintenance supervisor
- John, Andy, and Dave – other Bearpaw Lake employees
