= Elizabeth Norman =

American author and historian

Elizabeth Norman is an American author and historian. Her work focuses on nurses and the role of women in military history.

== Biography ==
External videos
- Booknotes interview with Norman on We Band of Angels, August 15, 1999, C-SPAN
- Presentation by Elizabeth and Michael Norman on Tears in the Darkness, June 26, 2009, C-SPAN

Norman earned a Ph.D. and M.A. from New York University and a B.S. from Rutgers University. She is a registered nurse. Norman has served as director of the doctoral program at New York University's Division of Nursing in the School of Education.

As an author, Norman has made significant contributions to the field of women's military history. Her work brings to light the often-neglected experiences of women during wartime. Her first book, Women at War, examines the previously untold experience of fifty women who served as nurses during the Vietnam War. Her second book, We Band of Angels, is based on interviews with female nurses who were held captive by the Japanese for three years in Bataan, Philippines during World War II. Norman was the first to speak to these women, known as the Angels of Bataan, about the tragedy they endured. She described the experience of conducting these interviews as, "women talking candidly about women swept up in a lethal enterprise of men." Her third book, Tears in the Darkness, is a history of the Bataan Death March and the American, Filipino, and Japanese combatants who were involved.

Her inspiration to write about military nurses came from her experience as a nurse as well as the fact that both her mother and husband have served in the U.S. military.

== Works ==
- Norman, Elizabeth M. (1999). We Band of Angels: The Untold Story of American Nurses Trapped on Bataan by the Japanese. New York: Random House. ISBN 0671787187. OCLC 39930499.
- Norman, Elizabeth M. (1990). Women at war: the story of fifty military nurses who served in Vietnam. Philadelphia: University of Pennsylvania Press. ISBN 0812282493. OCLC 21332836.
- Norman, Michael; Norman, Elizabeth M. (2009). Tears in the darkness : the story of the Bataan Death March and its aftermath. New York: Farrar, Straus, and Giroux. ISBN 9780374272609. OCLC 263984541.

== Reception ==
We Band of Angels was well received and has been reviewed by forty American newspapers, such as the New York Times and Washington Post. The Publishers Weekly review of the book read, "[Norman] captures moments of great courage...but the true highlights come in the evocation of tears and sweat that went into the nurses daily struggle."

Her book Tears in the Darkness, co-written with her husband Michael Norman, was listed number nine on the New York Times Best Sellers list for non-fiction in July 2009. The New York Times said of the book, "'Tears of Darkness' is a book about heroism and survival...If you aren't weeping openly by the book's final scenes...then you have a hard crust of salt around your soul."

== Awards ==
- Rutgers Living History Society's Stephen E. Ambrose Oral History Award, 2011
- Dayton Literary Peace Prize for Tears in the Darkness, 2010
- Lavinia Dock Award for historical scholarship
- American Academy of Nursing National Media Award
- Agnes Dillon Randolph Award
