= Waiter Rant =

- The Waiter Rant home page as of 2008-10-03
- Creator: Steve Dublanica
- Website: http://www.waiterrant.net
- Launched: April 2004

Waiter Rant is a weblog written by ex-waiter Steve Dublanica. In roughly bi-weekly installments, Dublanica wrote vignettes about the lives of wait staff and customers. Dublanica started the blog in 2004 and originally wrote anonymously as "The Waiter."

On July 29, 2008, the book Waiter Rant: Thanks for the Tip--Confessions of a Cynical Waiter, based on the blog, was published. The accompanying public relations, including TV appearances, meant that “The Waiter” had to give up his anonymity. The book spent five weeks on the New York Times nonfiction bestseller list in 2008.

The stories were originally about "The Bistro," a restaurant in the New York area where Dublanica worked for seven years through 2006. New York magazine later revealed that "The Bistro" is Lanterna Tuscan Bistro in Nyack, New York, which is no longer in business.

Later stories were about "Café Machiavelli." On July 19, 2008, Dublanica announced that he had quit his job at Café Machiavelli in preparation for his book's publication. Dublanica planned not to go back to the restaurant industry, although he would continue his blog.

Waiter Rant was one of five finalists for "Best American Weblog" for the 2006 Bloggie Awards.

Waiter Rant won "Best Writing in a Weblog" in the 2007 Bloggie Awards.

Announced January 27, 2007, Dublanica's piece Cold Autumn is included in the W.W. Norton anthology The Best Creative Nonfiction Vol. 1 (2007).

On July 8, 2008, Dublanica announced he would shed his anonymity and participate in a book signing and Q&A discussion at 7:00 PM on Tuesday, July 29 at Borders Books inside the Time Warner Building in Manhattan. He revealed himself as Steve Dublanica in an interview with the New York Post on July 29.

On September 22, 2008, it was announced that Ecco, an imprint of HarperCollins, ordered another book from Dublanica, titled At Your Service.

On September 29, 2008, Dublanica announced that his book had been optioned for TV.

Dublanica appeared as a guest on The Oprah Winfrey Show on October 15, 2008.

Waiter Rant, the book, has also been translated into Chinese, German, Italian, Portuguese and Spanish languages.

Dublanica wrote a second book, Keep the Change: A Clueless Tipper's Quest to Become the Guru of the Gratuity, which was published in 2010.

Stephen and his wife, Annie, announced the birth of their daughter, Natalie Marie, on January 16, 2014.

== Usual topics ==
Dublanica's topics of choice run the gamut from rude customers to bad tippers to conversations had throughout the day. There are also often posts about things occurring outside the restaurant which lead him to observations and reflections. There are many references to his past as a seminarian, as well as posts referencing his work in mental health care at an undisclosed psychiatric hospital.
