= Lori Wick =

American novelist

Lori Wick is an American author of Christian Romance novels. She writes a combination of historical and contemporary inspirational romance novels. Many of her books are published by Harvest House.

Wick won the 2005 Christian Retailing's Best—Women's Fiction, and INSPY listed her as one of the "Authors who Brought Inspirational Fiction into the 21st Century." She is a four-time finalist for the ECPA Gold Medallion Award.

According to Encyclopedia of Contemporary Christian Fiction: From C.S. Lewis to Left Behind, "[Wick] clearly believes that marriage is the ideal condition and that the family is not complete without children."

Wick lives in Wisconsin with her husband and three children.

== Bibliography ==
=== Place Called Home series ===
1. A Place Called Home, 1990
2. A Song for Silas, 1990
3. The Long Road Home, 1991
4. A Gathering of Memories 1991

=== The Californians series ===
Following a family who moves from their home of Hawaii to be in California.

1. Whatever Tomorrow Brings, 1992
2. As Time Goes By, 1992
3. Sean Donovan, 1993
4. Donovan's Daughter, 1994

=== Kensington Chronicles series ===
1. The Hawk and the Jewel, 1993
2. Wings of the Morning, 1994
3. Who Brings Forth the Wind, 1994
4. The Knight and the Dove, 1995

=== Rocky Mountain Memories series ===
Following members of several communities in Colorado Territory.

1. Where the Wild Rose Blooms, 1996
2. Whispers of Moonlight, 1996
3. To Know Her By Name, 1997
4. Promise Me Tomorrow, 1997

=== The Yellow Rose trilogy ===
Following the 3 Rawlings brothers in Texas

1. Every Little Thing About You, 1999
2. A Texas Sky, 2000
3. City Girl, 2001

=== English Garden series ===
A series featuring multiple families in Collingbourne, England in the 1800s.

1. The Proposal, 2002
2. The Rescue, 2002
3. The Visitor, 2003
4. The Pursuit, 2003

=== Tucker Mills trilogy ===
Stories of 3 families living in the town of Tucker Mills.

1. Moonlight On The Millpond, 2005
2. Just Above a Whisper, 2005
3. Leave a Candle Burning, 2006

=== Big Sky Dreams series ===
1. Cassidy, 2007
2. Sabrina, 2007
3. Jessie, 2008

=== Standalone novels ===
- Sophie's Heart, 1995
- Pretense, 1998
- The Princess, 1999 (republished in 2006)
- Reflections of a Thankful Heart, 2000
- Bamboo and Lace, 2001
- Kirby, the Disgruntled Tree, 2002
- Every Storm, 2004
- White Chocolate Moments, 2007

=== Collections and short stories ===
- Beyond the Picket Fence: And Other Short Stories, 1998
1. Be Careful with My Heart
2. Christmas For Two
3. The Haircut
4. Beyond the Picket Fence
5. An Intense Man
6. The Camping Trip
7. The Christmas Gift
8. The Rancher's Lady
- The Best of Lori Wick...A Gathering of Hearts: A Treasured Collection from Her Bestselling Novels, 2009
- Lori Wick Short Stories, Vol. 1: Be Careful with My Heart, The Haircut, 2017
- Lori Wick Short Stories, Vol. 2: Beyond the Picket Fence 2017
- Lori Wick Short Stories, Vol. 3: An Intense Man, The Camping Trip, 2017
- Lori Wick Short Stories, Vol. 4: The Rancher's Lady, 2017
- Lori Wick Short Stories, Christmas Special: Christmas for Two, The Christmas Gift, 2017
