= Jim Wooten (journalist) =

American journalist (1937–2026)

- Born: July 13, 1937; United States
- Died: June 4, 2026 (aged 88); Detroit, Michigan, U.S.
- Occupation: Journalist

Jim Wooten (July 13, 1937 – June 4, 2026) was an American journalist for ABC News, and an author. He won the Robert F. Kennedy Book Award in 2005 for We Are All the Same. He joined ABC News in 1979.

Wooten was married to Patience O'Connor. They had five daughters. Wooten died on June 4, 2026, at the age of 88.
