= Charles Fleming (author) =

American author

- Born: North Carolina, U.S.
- Occupation: Journalist
- Website: www.charlesfleming.com

Charles Fleming is an American author. In addition to writing multiple books on multiple subjects, fiction and non-fiction, he has also had a long career in print and TV journalism. As a staff writer for the Los Angeles Times he was the automobile and motorcycle reviewer and editor of the paper's Hollywood business section, Company Town. He has written extensively as a freelancer, for publications as varied as Vanity Fair, Entertainment Weekly, and TV Guide.

== Background ==
Prior to joining the Los Angeles Times Fleming was a staff writer for the Los Angeles Herald-Examiner, Variety, and Newsweek and for many years served as an adjunct faculty member at the University of Southern California's Annenberg School of Journalism.

Among his published works are the best-selling High Concept: Don Simpson and the Hollywood Culture of Excess, and My Lobotomy, co-authored with the subject, Howard Dully. Fleming is also author of the popular Los Angeles-based urban walking guides, Secret Stairs and Secret Walks, and their Bay Area counterpart, Secret Stairs East Bay. He is also the author of the novels The Ivory Coast, After Havana and The Studio Kill.

Born in North Carolina, a graduate of UCLA, and raised in Pacific Palisades, California, he is an Eagle Scout.

== Published works ==
- Fleming, Charles (2015). Secret Walks: A Walking Guide to the Hidden Trails of Los Angeles. ISBN 9781595800824.
- Secret Stairs: A Walking Guide to the Historic Staircases of Los Angeles.
- Secret Stairs East Bay: A Walking Guide to the Historic Staircases of Berkeley and Oakland.
- The Studio Kill.
- The Ivory Coast.
- After Havana.
- My Lobotomy
- High Concept: Don Simpson and the Hollywood Culture of Excess. Doubleday. 1998. ISBN 978-0-385-48694-1.
- Three Weeks in October: The Manhunt for the Serial Sniper. ISBN 978-0-525-94777-6.
- A Goomba's Guide to Life.
- The Goomba Diet.
- Nicky Deuce: Welcome to the Family.
- Nicky Deuce: Home for the Holidays.
