= Mike Kellogg =

American radio announcer and personality (1941–2023)

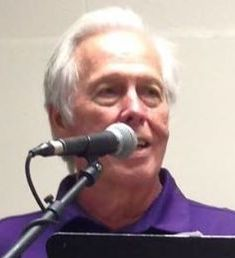
- Born: September 27, 1941; Cedarville, Ohio, U.S.
- Died: June 25, 2023 (aged 81); Valparaiso, Indiana, U.S.
- Occupations: Announcer, writer, teacher
- Years active: 1960s–2014
- Spouse: Nancy Caryln Smith (m. 1965)
- Children: 6

Michael S. Kellogg (September 27, 1941 – June 25, 2023) was an American radio announcer and personality. He was known as the senior announcer with Moody Radio and host for Music Thru The Night until his retirement in 2014.

== Early life ==
Kellogg was born in Detroit, Michigan, on September 26, 1941 to Robert Kellogg and Georgia Lyman. He was later educated at Cedarville College in Cedarville, Ohio. Kellogg moved to Valparaiso, Indiana.

== Career ==
Kellogg first wanted to be a writer who later got a job for a newspaper company at a young age, and was later writing for the broadcasting company in Chicago.

In late 1982 Kellogg was hired to be host of Music Thru the Night for Moody Radio. Kellogg spoke to the late-night listener, presenting a relaxed yet direct message of the fullness of a life with Christ. In Music Thru the Night, Kellogg was heard in the audio of the New Living Translation (NLT) of the Bible accessible through the application YouVersion. His voice is characterized by a poetic and dramatic tone and the audio includes occasional musical background.

Kellogg also hosted Today in the Word, a daily two-minute broadcasting program and was also a featured columnist for the broadcasting Moody Radio. Aside from his broadcasting career, Kellogg taught English and speech at Moody Bible Institute. He also directed and performed in various radio dramas between the 1970s and 1990s.

Kellogg officially retired in May 2014.

== Personal life and death ==
Kellogg was married to Nancy Smith from 1965 until his death, with whom he had six children and ten grandchildren. Kellogg lived in Valparaiso, Indiana. Kellogg was an educator of New Testament theology.

Kellogg died in Valparaiso on June 25, 2023, at the age of 81.

== Honors ==
In February 2015, Kellogg was inducted to the National Religious Broadcasters Hall of Fame.
