= Elizabeth Cohen =

American television news journalist

- Born: Elizabeth Sondra Schwartz
- Education: Columbia University; Boston University
- Occupation: Journalist
- Spouse: Tal Cohen
- Children: 4

Elizabeth Cohen (born Elizabeth Sondra Schwartz) is an American television news journalist for CNN. She is the channel's senior medical correspondent and appears on various programs.

== Early life ==
She was born Elizabeth Sondra Schwartz, the daughter of Sheila Fay (née Gopen) and Charles A. "Chuck" Schwartz. Her father was a physician. She has two sisters and a brother: Pamela Fay Cohen, Julia Molly Healy, and David Ansin Schwartz and was raised in Needham, Massachusetts. She is of Jewish descent. Cohen attended Columbia College, and graduated in 1987 with a bachelor's degree in history. In 1992, she graduated with a master's degree in public health from Boston University. She has received outstanding alumna awards from both colleges.

== Career ==
Cohen worked at WLVI in Boston as associate producer of environmental program Green Watch. She also worked as a reporter for States News Service in Washington, DC and for The Times Union in Albany, New York. Cohen joined CNN in 1991. She focuses on health-related issues and has reported from a medical angle on major news stories including the Gulf oil spill, the 2010 Haiti earthquake and Hurricane Katrina. She is currently senior medical correspondent for CNN's Health, Medical and Wellness unit.

== Awards ==
Cohen won a Hearst Award during her time at the Times Union. She won a Sigma Delta Chi Award from the Society of Professional Journalists and a National Headliner Award for the feature "A Lesson Before Dying" in 2006. She was honored by the Newswomen's Club of New York, the New York Association of Black Journalists for the feature "African-Americans and Bone Marrow Transplants", and the Mental Health America Media Awards in 2007 for her reporting work. She won a Gracie Award in 2008 for the feature "Where’s Molly?"

She contributed to CNN's Emmy Award-winning coverage of Hurricane Katrina and the September 11 attacks.

== Works ==
She published a book titled The Empowered Patient in 2010.

== Personal life ==
She is married to Israeli-born entrepreneur Tal Cohen; they have four daughters.
