= ICon =

2005 biography by Jeffrey S. Young and William L. Simon

iCon
- Author: Jeffrey S. Young; William L. Simon
- Publisher: Wiley
- Publication date: 2005
- Publication place: United States
- Pages: 368
- ISBN: 0-471-72083-6 2nd ed. ISBN 0-471-78784-1

iCon: Steve Jobs, The Greatest Second Act in the History of Business is an unauthorized biography by Jeffrey S. Young and William L. Simon about the return of Steve Jobs to Apple Inc. in 1997. It was published in 2005.

The book's title is a pun with one connotation that of Jobs as an icon with attributes to be admired, while carrying the negative interpretation as I-(am a)-Con, as in a con man, criticized for charisma used in harmful ways such as the "reality distortion field". The non-capitalized "i" at the beginning is also in reference to many of Apple's products, such as the iPhone, iMac, iPod, and iTunes.

It is the followup to Young's 1988 biography, Steve Jobs: The Journey Is the Reward.

== Criticism ==
In an article for the San Francisco Chronicle, Alan Deutschman criticizes iCon, pointing out the similarity of the book's content to his own previous biography of Steve Jobs, The Second Coming of Steve Jobs.

As retribution for publishing this unauthorized biography, Jobs banned all publications from publisher John Wiley & Sons from Apple retail stores. However, in its 2010 annual earnings report, Wiley said it had "closed a deal ... to make its titles available for the iPad."
