= Tearing Down the Wall of Sound =

2007 book by Mick Brown

- Author: Mick Brown
- Publication date: June 5, 2007
- ISBN: 978-1400042197

Tearing Down the Wall of Sound is a biography of record producer Phil Spector, written by Mick Brown and published in 2007. Later in his life Spector was a recluse. Time Out commented on the "inevitable true-crime element".
