= Kelly Corrigan =

American writer

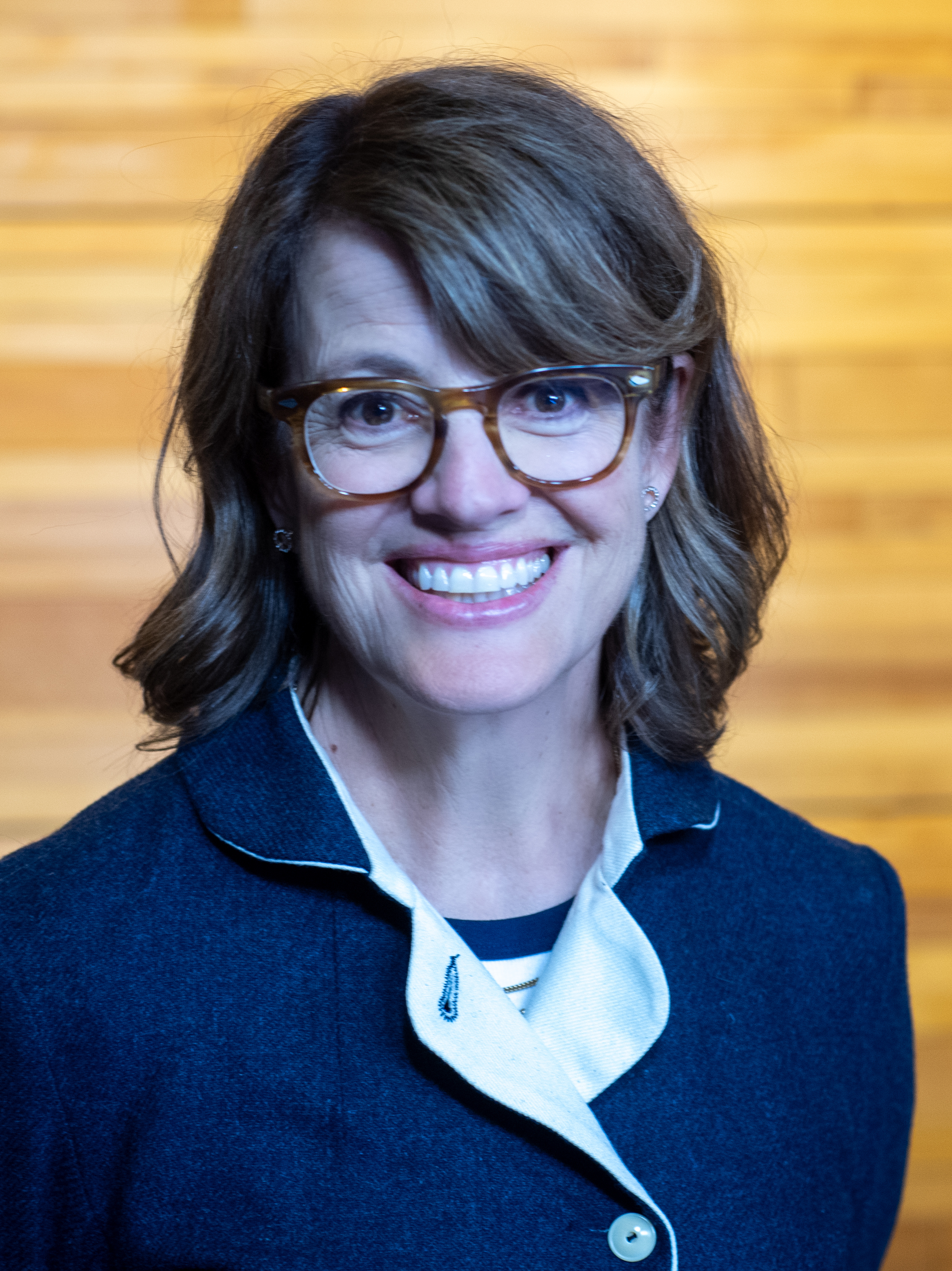
- Kelly Corrigan in 2025
- Born: August 16, 1967 (age 59); Radnor, Pennsylvania
- Education: University of Richmond (B.A.); San Francisco State University (M.A.)
- Occupation: Writer
- Spouse: Edward Lichty
- Children: Claire Lichty, Georgia Lichty
- Writing career
- Genres: Memoir, non-fiction
- Website: kellycorrigan.com

Kelly Corrigan (born August 16, 1967) is the author of four New York Times bestselling books about family life: The Middle Place, Glitter and Glue, Lift and Tell Me More. She is the host of the long form interview show Tell Me More on PBS, now in its 7th season, as well as the podcast and NPR radio show Kelly Corrigan Wonders, which has over 400 episodes (as of February 2024). She regularly gives keynote speeches, graduation addresses and book readings. She has appeared on The Today Show 7 times.

== Life ==
She is a graduate of Radnor High School, the University of Richmond and received a master's degree in Literature from San Francisco State University and moved to Bozeman, MT after raising her daughters, Georgia and Claire, in the Bay Area.

== Writing ==
Corrigan's first book, The Middle Place, is a memoir about her Irish-American father's battle with cancer and her own triumph over the disease. It was published on January 8, 2008 (hardcover) and December 23, 2008 (paperback). At its peak, the hardcover reached No. 2 on the Non-fiction New York Times bestseller list. The paperback has reached No. 2 on the Trade Paperback Non-fiction New York Times bestseller list to date. The Middle Place was also recognized by Barnes and Noble as part of the "Discover Great New Writers" campaign.

Her second book, Lift, published in 2010, which also reached No. 2 on the New York Times bestseller list, is written in the form of a letter to her children, and is an examination of risk and parenthood through the lens of 3 true stories.

Her third book, Glitter and Glue, published in 2014, which also reached No. 2 on the New York Times bestseller list, was a reflection on motherhood through the story of Kelly's stint as a nanny in Australia for a family whose mother had recently died.

Her fourth book, Tell Me More, Stories About the 12 Hardest Things I’m Learning to Say, was a collection of essays on the essential statements adult life requires.

Corrigan also wrote a children's book about the rewards of curiosity called Hello, World! for children of all ages who are facing a transition or graduation.

Corrigan is also the author of an essay about "women's remarkable capacity to support each other, to laugh together, and to endure" called Transcending– a reading by the author, released by Hyperion / everywomansvoice.com, has received over 4 million views on YouTube to date.

== Podcasting ==
Kelly Corrigan Wonders publishes 3 episodes per week.

- Every Tuesday, the show releases a long-form interview.
- Every Friday, the show releases a short solo episode called For the Good of the Order.
- Every Sunday, the show releases a listener submission in a series called Thanks for Being Here that features eulogies, graduation speeches, wedding vows and other remarks shared by listeners.

The podcast began in October 2020, is distributed by Audacy and produced by Oscar-winning producer Tammy Stedman.

== Television ==
Tell Me More with Kelly Corrigan is a series that began in October 2020 and is in its 7th season. Hosted by Kelly Corrigan, the show features insightful conversations with notable guests, reflecting on their lives and the impact they can have on their worlds.

== Works ==
=== Nonfiction ===
- The Middle Place (Hachette, 2008; ISBN 9781401395575)
- Lift (Hachette, 2010; ISBN 9781401395056)
- Glitter and Glue: a Memoir (Random House, 2014; ISBN 9780345532855)
- Tell Me More: Stories About the 12 Hardest Things I'm Learning to Say (Random House, 2018; ISBN 9780399588396)

=== Children's literature ===
- Hello World! (Penguin, 2021; ISBN 9780593206089)
