= Luis Carlos Montalvan =

American writer

- Born: April 13, 1973; Washington D.C.
- Died: December 2, 2016 (aged 43); El Paso, Texas

Luis Carlos Montalvan (April 13, 1973 – December 2, 2016) was an American soldier and author. He was born in Washington, D.C., grew up in Potomac, Maryland, completed a BA at the University of Maryland and an MA (Journalism) at Columbia University. He served two tours of duty in Iraq and was an advocate for the use of service dogs. He also raised awareness about PTSD and its impact on veterans. He was also known for his New York Times Bestselling memoir, Until Tuesday: A Wounded Warrior and the Golden Retriever Who Saved Him (2011), co-written with author, Bret Witter. Tuesday, Luis's service dog and the subject of the eponymous book, died in September 2019.

Montalvan was born in Washington D.C., and grew up in Potomac, Maryland. He was Cuban-American. When he was 17, he joined the United States Army, though he was discharged. He was later in the Reserve Officers' Training Corps while he attended the University of Maryland. In 2003, he was deployed to Iraq. On December 21, 2003, Montalvan describes how he was stabbed by a knife at a checkpoint in Al-Waleed. However, other members of the military have disputed the exact details of how Montalvan was injured and exactly what happened that night. An Associated Press report also disputed Montalvan's description of the event and other descriptions written in his memoir, Until Tuesday. Montalvan addresses these differences in his book.

He served two tours of duty in Iraq with the 3rd Armored Cavalry Regiment under the command of then-Col. H.R. McMaster and obtained the rank of captain. He completed a total of seventeen years of service, and was honorably discharged. He was awarded two Bronze Star Medals, the Purple Heart, the Army Commendation Medal for Valor and the Combat Action Badge.

Montalvan was diagnosed with post-traumatic stress disorder (PTSD) in July 2007. After leaving the military, he experienced anxiety so severe, he was unable to leave his home. He began drinking heavily and was in chronic pain. In 2008, he met Tuesday, a golden retriever and a service dog. Tuesday was almost a washout from the service dog program, ECAD, but he was a good match for Montalvan. Tuesday also helped him meet Senator Al Franken, who later introduced legislation to provide service dogs to veterans.

In 2009, Montalvan sued McDonald's for refusing to allow his service dog entry to a restaurant in New York City and being hit with garbage can lids when he attempted to film the interaction. The suit was settled out of court in June 2010. Montalvan completed a MA at Columbia Journalism School (2010).

Montalvan said that Tuesday was a constant companion, having the ability to detect the onset of a nightmare. Montalvan's dog, Tuesday, made it possible for him to walk because he experienced sudden spells of vertigo. Tuesday also retrieved items that Montalvan was unable to reach. Tuesday won the 2013-2014 American Kennel Club Award for Canine Excellence. The owners of the winners of the award receive $1,000 to donate to a pet-related charity of their choice.

In early 2016, Montalvan had done an trans-femoral amputation procedure to his right leg above the knee. He described his difficulties with the experience on a webpage that he raised money for an osseointegration procedure that would fuse a titanium rod into the remaining leg bone to attach to a prosthesis.

Montalvan was found dead on December 2, 2016, following a welfare check by the local police at the Indigo Hotel in El Paso, Texas on December 2, 2016. He purposely left his dog in the care of others in Northeast El Paso. An autopsy report released by the El Paso County Medical Examiner's Office in January indicated that Montalvan had died by suicide, through overdosing on pentobarbital.

== Work ==
Montalvan's book, Until Tuesday: A Wounded Warrior and the Golden Retriever Who Saved Him (2011), written with Bret Witter describes his struggles with PTSD, combat injuries and his experiences with his service dog. Montalvan started to receive thousands of letters from people who have described how their own pets or service animals had saved their lives after Until Tuesday came out. Publishers Weekly felt that Until Tuesday was "most compelling when zoning in on specifics, especially related to his psychological disorder." Montalvan shared with the Wisconsin State Journal that it was important to him to write this book in order to describe what it was like to have his health deteriorate after coming back from war. The book made it to the Top 20 in the New York Times Bestseller list.

Montalvan was featured in Ben Selkow's documentary film about PTSD, Buried Above Ground, in 2015.

Montalvan also wrote two children's books, Tuesday Tucks Me In: The Loyal Bond Between a Soldier and His Service Dog, and Tuesday Takes Me There: The Healing Journey of a Veteran and his Service Dog.

Tuesday's Promise, written with Ellis Henican, was released in May 2017.

Montalvan has appeared on the Late Show With David Letterman, NPR, CNN and C-SPAN. He has also been published in the New York Times and the Huffington Post. Montalvan had brought Tuesday to several schools to teach students about his journey.
