= Renee Raudman =

American actress

Renee Raudman (born October 29) is an American actress who performed the English voices of Nastasha Romanenko in the video game Metal Gear Solid (under the pseudonym of Renne Collette) and its GameCube remake (using her real name) and Oyu in Onimusha Blade Warriors. She also provides the voice of the recurring character Ms. Butterbean on the cartoon series The Grim Adventures of Billy & Mandy. Outside of voiceover, Renee has recorded over 30 audiobook narrations, including as a co-reader on Dark of Night written by Suzanne Brockmann (New York Times best selling author of Into the Fire) and 13 books written by New York Times best selling author Ilona Andrews.

Renee has also appeared on camera in recurring roles on various TV shows such as 3rd Rock from the Sun, Passions, and in quick one-episode character spots on The Drew Carey Show, Hercules: The Legendary Journeys, and Diagnosis: Murder.
