= Nonna Bannister =

Russian-American author and Holocaust survivor (1927–2004)

- Born: Nonna Lisowskaja; 22 September 1927; Taganrog, Russia
- Died: 15 August 2004 (aged 76); Jackson, Tennessee, U.S.
- Known for: Writer

Nonna Bannister (née Lisowskaja; 22 September 1927 – 15 August 2004) was a Russian-American author and Holocaust survivor. She is best known for her memoir, The Secret Holocaust Diaries: The Untold Story of Nonna Bannister (2009, Tyndale House: ISBN 978-1-4143-2547-7), which she wrote before, during, and after her time in a World War II German labor camp and kept hidden in a pillow.

== Biography ==
Bannister's father was Polish and her mother, Russian and she grew up in the Russian Orthodox faith. Her wealthy family lost everything when World War II broke out. In 1942, Bannister and her mother, Anna, had few options available and so they voluntarily left to work in Germany.

However, the offer of work took them to a prison camp instead of a factory. In 1943, Bannister and her mother were working in a hospital treating prisoners of war. She was able to speak six languages so when she started keeping notes of her experiences in the camp, she wrote them in different languages so the Nazis wouldn't discover them. She hid the notes in a pillow which she kept strapped to her body during WWII.

Her mother was later taken to a concentration camp where Bannister thought she had died some two years later. Bannister was the only one of 35 relatives to survive. Her mother had actually survived the camps, but the two women never saw each other again. When Bannister was rescued from the camps, her health had deteriorated and she spent some time in a Catholic German hospital.

== United States ==
Bannister met her future husband, Henry Bannister, in 1950 at Tulane University. They married in 1951. The couple moved from Louisiana to Houston, Texas in 1971 and a few years later to Memphis in 1978. Each time, Henry saw that moving was difficult for his wife.

Bannister was reluctant to share her past with Henry, but in the 1980s, Henry persuaded her to draw up a family tree for her children. This eventually led to Bannister sharing her secret notes of her life in the past. When she introduced the notes to Henry, she said, "I want you to meet my family." Henry attempted to have the memoirs published in the 1990s, but the book was not accepted. As her health declined, she asked that Henry not publish anything until after she died, so that she wouldn't have to relive the memories.

== Legacy ==
Bannister died in Jackson, Tennessee on 15 August 2004, aged 76. After she died, Henry began typing up her story as a memoir. He asked a neighbor, Carolyn Tomlin, in 2007 to help him with the manuscript.

The manuscript led to the publication of a book about Bannister's life and experience called The Secret Holocaust Diaries: The Untold Story of Nonna Bannister (2009). The book led to Bannister's husband and children connecting with surviving relatives in Ukraine. Her son, John, continues to share her story about the Holocaust.
