= Howard Dully =

American memoirist (1948–2025)

- Born: November 30, 1948; Oakland, California, U.S.
- Died: February 11, 2025 (aged 76)
- Known for: One of the youngest survivors of a transorbital lobotomy
- Spouse: Barbara Dully
- Children: 2

Howard Dully (November 30, 1948 – February 11, 2025) was an American memoirist who was one of the youngest survivors of the transorbital lobotomy, a procedure performed on him when he was 12 years old.

Dully received international attention in 2005, following the broadcasting of his story on National Public Radio. Subsequently, in 2007, he published a New York Times Best Seller memoir, My Lobotomy, a story of the hardships of his lobotomy, co-authored by Charles Fleming.

== Biography ==
Howard Dully was born on November 30, 1948, in Oakland, California, the eldest son of Rodney and June Louise Pierce Dully. Following the death of his mother from cancer in 1954, Dully's father married single mother Shirley Lucille Hardin in 1955.

Neurologist Walter Freeman had diagnosed Dully as suffering from childhood schizophrenia since age four, although numerous other medical and psychiatric professionals who had seen Dully did not detect a psychiatric disorder and instead blamed poor parenting by his stepmother. Freeman's notes stated that Dully's stepmother feared him, and that "He doesn't react either to love or to punishment... He objects to going to bed but then sleeps well. He does a good deal of daydreaming and when asked about it he says 'I don't know.' He turns the room's lights on when there is broad sunlight outside." In 1960, at 12 years of age, Dully was submitted by his father and stepmother for a trans-orbital lobotomy, performed by Freeman for $200 (equivalent to $2,177 in 2025). During the procedure, a long, sharp instrument called an orbitoclast was inserted through each of Dully's eye sockets 7 centimeters (2.8 in) into his brain.

Dully was institutionalized for years as a juvenile in Agnews State Hospital as a minor; transferred to Rancho Linda School in San Jose, California, a school for children with behavior-related problems; incarcerated; and was eventually homeless and an alcoholic. After becoming sober and getting a college degree in computer information systems, he became a California state certified behind-the-wheel instructor for a school bus company in San Jose, California.

In his 50s, with the assistance of National Public Radio producer David Isay, Dully started to research what had happened to him as a child. By this time, both his stepmother and Freeman were dead, and due to the aftereffects of the surgery, he was unable to rely on his own memories. He travelled the country with Isay and Piya Kochhar, speaking with members of his family, relatives of other lobotomy patients, and relatives of Freeman, and also gaining access to Freeman's archives. Dully first relayed his story on a National Public Radio broadcast in 2005, prior to co-authoring a memoir published in 2007.

== National Public Radio ==
On November 16, 2005, David Isay broadcast Dully's search as a Sound Portraits documentary on NPR. According to USA Today, the documentary, which The New York Times describes as "celebrated", "created a firestorm".

The broadcast, aired on All Things Considered, drew more listener response than any other program that had ever aired, and by May 2006, the Crown Publishing Group had negotiated worldwide rights to publish Howard Dully's story in book form.

== Memoir ==
My Lobotomy
- Author: Howard Dully and Charles Fleming
- Language: English
- Genre: Memoir
- Publisher: Crown
- Publication date: September 17, 2007
- Publication place: United States
- Media type: Print
- Pages: 272

In 2007, Dully published My Lobotomy, a memoir co-authored by Charles Fleming.

The memoir relates Howard Dully's experiences as a child, the effect of the procedure on his life, his efforts as an adult to discover why the medically unnecessary procedure was performed on him and the effect of the radio broadcast on his life.

The book was critically well received. The New York Times described it as "harrowing", "one of the saddest stories you'll ever read". USA Today called it "at once horrifying and inspiring". The San Francisco Chronicle critiqued it as "a gruesome but compulsively readable tale, ultimately redemptive". In the United Kingdom, The Observer characterized the book as "a forceful account of his survival" that "sheds light on the man who subjected him to one of the most brutal surgical procedures in medical history". The Times described it as "uncomfortable reading", noting that "[i]t is, given the circumstances, astonishingly free of rancour."

In the last section of the memoir, entitled "One Last Word", Dully compared his lobotomy to young children today who are diagnosed with depression, bipolar disorder, or attention deficit hyperactivity disorder without a second opinion, and are subsequently overmedicated.

== Death ==
On March 11, 2025, it was announced that Dully had died on February 11, at the age of 76.
