= Dispatches from the Edge =

Book by Anderson Cooper

Dispatches from the Edge: A memoir of War, Disasters, and Survival
- Author: Anderson Cooper
- Language: English
- Genre: Non-fiction
- Publication date: 2006

Dispatches from the Edge: A memoir of War, Disasters, and Survival is a best-selling book written by Anderson Cooper. On June 18, 2006, it was listed at #1 on The New York Times Non-Fiction Best Seller list. It contains revelations about growing up as the younger son of Gloria Vanderbilt. Reflections include the devastating effects of his father's early demise (heart attack) as well as of his older brother's inexplicable suicide.
