= True Compass =

Book by Edward Kennedy

- Author: Edward M. Kennedy with Ron Powers, editor Jonathan Karp
- Cover artist: Anne Twomey (design); Denis Reggie (photograph)
- Language: English
- Genre: Memoir
- Publisher: Twelve
- Publication date: September 14, 2009
- Publication place: United States
- Pages: x, 532
- ISBN: 978-0-446-53925-8
- OCLC: 434905205
- Dewey Decimal: 973.92/092
- LC Class: E840.8.K35 A3 2009

True Compass is the posthumous memoir of United States Senator Edward M. Kennedy that was released September 14, 2009, by Twelve, a division of the Hachette book group.

== History ==
Ted Kennedy signed up to do the book in the autumn of 2007. Kennedy received a reported $8 million advance for the work. It was written with the help of Pulitzer Prize-winning collaborator Ron Powers and was based on contemporaneous notes taken by Kennedy throughout his life, hours of recordings for an oral history project, and long interviews. Despite the collaboration, Kennedy literary representative Robert Barnett said that "every word" in the work was Kennedy's. Kennedy's editor, Jonathan Karp, later said that "it was very clear from the outset that he was setting out to write a work of history, a work of personal history, and that he wanted this book very much to be a legacy." After he received his brain cancer diagnosis in 2008, Kennedy halted work on the book for a while, but then returned to it with renewed vigor and as one of his top priorities. He died the day a final copy of his book was delivered to his Hyannis Port, Massachusetts home.

The work was originally intended for publication in 2010, then moved up to October 2009, and then finally moved up to September 2009, less than a month after Kennedy's death. A Twelve spokesperson said, "The book was completed earlier this summer. Our original publication date was October 6. We’d always hoped to publish sooner. The production process moved faster than expected, so we were able to shave off some time." After The New York Times obtained the book before its publication date and released some information about it, the Twelve spokesperson said he was "dismayed" that the Times had obtained it and that "we regret that the New York Times did not respect the September 14th release date of 'True Compass', which was carefully coordinated with the senator's family. That copy was obtained without consent or permission from Twelve – or if it was somehow purchased, then it was sold illegally." True Compass had an announced first printing of 1.5 million copies.

== Themes ==
The memoir deals with Kennedy's experiences with the assassination of his two older brothers, John and Robert, the Chappaquiddick incident in 1969, his battle with drinking and with brain cancer, why he decided to run for president in 1980, his personal and professional relationships with Democratic presidents including his often tense, strained relations with Jimmy Carter and Bill Clinton, and his lifelong fight for universal health care.

A broader theme of the book is, in the words of The New York Times's Michiko Kakutani, "that persistence, perseverance and patience in pursuit of a cause or atonement for one’s failures can lead to achievement and the possibility of redemption."

== Critical and commercial reception ==
In his review for the Saturday Age, Guy Rundle wrote that the memoir "follows the party line" when discussing the various scandals that "marked" Kennedy's long career in the Senate. He thought it was useful in documenting the campaigns that Kennedy ran in the 1970s and 1980s. Jonathan Yardley for The Washington Post said that "Kennedy [seeks] to be modest about the successes in his long public life and honest about the failures" but that "like virtually all political autobiographies these days, it has the air of having been written by committee. ... It is not always possible to tell where Kennedy's voice ends and that of his capable collaborator, Ron Powers, begins." The Washington Times said that "Kennedy has produced a revelatory – though not tabloidesque – account of his storied life and career. While the Massachusetts Democrat was not without ego, he is willing to share the credit both with colleagues and family members for his successes and isn't shy about accepting blame for his many mistakes."

Former television anchor Roger Mudd took issue with Kennedy's version of their 1979 CBS interview which famously did damage to his 1980 presidential bid. Mudd said there was no deceit about the purpose or context of the interviews, and told that "I remain mystified, perplexed, angered, and saddened that the senator would have endorsed such a false account in what amounted to his last testament."

True Compass sold 170,000 copies during its first five days of publication, and debuted at number one on the New York Times Best Seller list. By mid-December 2009, the book has had total sales of some 400,000 copies and has spent 13 weeks on the New York Times Best Seller list.

An e-book edition was scheduled for release on Christmas Day 2009. However, a planned paperback edition was pushed back to 2011 due to the renewed vigor of the hardcover book's sales following a November 2009 appearance by widow Victoria Reggie Kennedy on The Oprah Winfrey Show.
