= Theresa Flores =

American activist

Theresa Flores is an American survivor of and campaigner against sex trafficking, and the creator of Save Our Adolescents from Prostitution (S.O.A.P.), a nonprofit organization that aims to help prevent sex trafficking. She is a devout Catholic and has attributed her faith in God to sustaining her through her ordeal.

== Early life and trafficking ==
As a child, Flores' father was a business executive and his job required their family to move from city to city. In her writing, Flores describes how, at 15 and living in Detroit, she was drugged and raped by a male classmate from her high school. The rapist's older cousins had taken pictures of the attack, and used it for sexual blackmail. She describes how, under the threat of violence and the release of the pictures, she was forced to submit, several nights a week, to being gang raped, sometimes by dozens of men. Her two years long ordeal did not end until her dad was transferred to another city. It took Flores many years to speak about her experiences. Flores received her bachelor's degree from Ball State University in Social work and continued her education at the University of Dayton in Ohio, getting her Master's degree in Counseling Education, specializing in Human Development so she could help people who have gone through the same or similar things she has.

== Activism and legal influence ==
Flores is a licensed social worker and the founder of Save Our Adolescents from Prostitution (S.O.A.P.), which gives motels and hotels bars of soap labeled with phone numbers that victims can call for help.

In 2009, Flores was chosen for the Ohio Attorney General's Commission to study human trafficking. She has presented evidence on the problem of human trafficking to the Ohio House of Representatives and Ohio Senate. In 2010 her testimony was a major part of the passing of Senate Bill 235 in Ohio, making human trafficking a felony in the state.

Flores received one of the first "Courage" Awards from Gov. John Kasich in Ohio in 2012, and received the "Ruby Award" in 2009 from Soroptimist. She received the University of Dayton’s Alumni Association 2013 Christian Service Award for her work with S.O.A.P.

Enacted in 2015, Michigan Senate Bill 584 included a subdivision named "Theresa Flores' Law," which extended the statute of limitations for the crime of human trafficking from 6 years to 25 years. (In its originally proposed form, which was passed by the Michigan Senate without amendment in 2013, the bill would have entirely removed the statute of limitations for human trafficking.)

== Public Appearances ==
Theresa Flores has given interviews regarding her experience, her outreach through S.O.A.P., and the influence her faith has had on her survival journey.

- TEDxColumbus 2011 - Theresa Flores - Find a Voice with Soap
- The Why Me Project - Feb. 2024

== Published works ==
- The Sacred Bath - iUniverse, 2007
- The Slave Across the Street - Ampelon Publishing, 2010; Random House, 2013
- Slavery in the Land of the Free - Ampelon Publishing, 2016
