= Here Comes Trouble: Stories from My Life =

2011 Autobiography book based on the life of Filmmaker Michael Moore

- Author: Michael Moore
- Language: English
- Subject: Autobiography
- Publisher: Grand Central Publishing
- Publication date: September 13, 2011
- Publication place: United States
- Pages: 448
- ISBN: 978-0-446-53224-2
- OCLC: 317746461

Here Comes Trouble: Stories from My Life is an autobiography by American filmmaker Michael Moore.

== Critical reception ==
Here Comes Trouble received mixed reviews from critics. James Sullivan of The A.V. Club stated that "[Here Comes Trouble is] a disjointed series of scenes from a life spent making a scene", and rated the book as a "B−". However, Andy Lewis of The Hollywood Reporter stated that "though occasionally uneven, the best parts of Here Comes Trouble are fabulous." Alan MacKenzie of the Winnipeg Free Press gave the book a positive review. Dwight Garner of The New York Times said "Moore's coming of age as a working-class malcontent is [...] something to behold", while also calling the book "shaggy and overfilled". Sam Leith of The Guardian questioned the authenticity of the book, stating "the overwhelming impression is that [...] these tales have been adapted or embellished".
