= The Nazi Officer's Wife =

1999 autobiography by Edith Hahn-Beer

- Author: Edith Hahn-Beer
- Language: English
- Published: 1999
- Publisher: Rob Weibach Books; William Morrow and Company
- Publication place: United States

The Nazi Officer's Wife: How One Jewish Woman Survived the Holocaust is a 1999 autobiography by Austrian-born Edith Hahn-Beer. Written with the help of Susan Dworkin, the book's first edition was published by Rob Weibach Books and William Morrow and Company. A documentary film based on the source material and starring Hahn-Beer herself was released in 2003. A revised version of the book was published in 2009.

== Translations ==
- German, as Ich ging durchs Feuer und brannte nicht : Eine aussergewöhnliche Lebens- und Liebesgeschichte (2002)
- French, as La femme de l'officier nazi : comment une Juive survécut à l'Holocauste (2002)
- Italian, as La moglie dell'ufficiale nazista (2003)
- Dutch, as De joodse bruid (2001)
- Japanese, as ナチ将校の妻 : あるユダヤ人女性55年目の告白 (Nachi shōkō no tsuma : aru Yudayajin josei 55-nenme no kokuhaku) (2000)
- Sinhalese, as Yuddhayē aturu katāvaka : (nāsi hamudā niladhāriya gē birinda) (2004).
- Thai, as เมียนาซี (2005).
- Russian, as "Жена немецкого офицера" (2016).

== 2003 documentary ==
Directed by Liz Garbus and written by Jack Youngelson, the 2003 documentary retelling of the book stars Hahn-Beer, who was approximately 90 years old at the time. The film features the voice of Julia Ormond and is narrated by Susan Sarandon. In addition to being shown in movie theatres, the film was run on the American TV channel A&E on June 19, 2003. It was reviewed by several major newspapers, including The New York Times and the Boston Herald, and was nominated for a prime-time Emmy.

== Planned film adaptation ==
A film adaptation of The Nazi Officer's Wife was planned at one point in 2010. Directed by Mike Figgis, written by Charlie Stratton, and Craig P. Sherman and starring Eva Green, Thomas Kretschmann, and Alexandra Maria Lara, it was anticipated for release in 2011 but was never filmed. Co-author Susan Dworkin reports that the movie rights are once again available.
