= Edith Hahn Beer =

Austrian Holocaust survivor

- Born: January 24, 1914
- Died: March 17, 2009 (aged 95) London, England
- Other names: Grete Denner, Grete Vetter
- Spouses: Werner Vetter (m. 1944; div. 1947) Fred Beer (m. 1957; died 1984)
- Children: Angelika "Angela" Schlüter

Edith Hahn Beer (January 24, 1914 – March 17, 2009) was an Austrian Jewish woman who survived the Holocaust by hiding her Jewish identity and marrying a Nazi officer.

== Life ==
=== Early life and education ===
Hahn was one of three daughters born to Klothilde and Leopold Hahn. Her parents owned and ran a restaurant. In June 1936 Leopold died while working as a restaurant manager at a hotel in the Alps.

Although it was uncommon for a girl of that time to attend high school, Hahn's teacher persuaded Leopold to send his daughter. After graduating, Hahn continued her studies at university and was studying law at the time of the Anschluss, when she was forced to leave the university because she was Jewish.

=== World War II ===
In 1939, Hahn and her mother were sent to the Jewish ghetto in Vienna. They were separated in April 1941, when Hahn was sent to an asparagus plantation in Osterburg, Germany and then to the Bestehorn paper factory in Aschersleben. Her mother had been deported to Nazi Germany-occupied Poland two weeks before Hahn was able to return to Vienna, in 1942. With duplicate copies of the identity papers of a Christian friend, Christa Denner, Hahn went to Munich.

In Munich, Hahn volunteered as a German Red Cross nurse. There she met Werner Vetter, a Nazi party member who sought her hand in marriage even after she told him she was Jewish. They lived together in Brandenburg an der Havel, married, and had a daughter, Angelika, born in 1944.

Vetter, whose blindness in one eye had initially exempted him from military service, was ultimately drafted as a Nazi officer. He was captured by the Russians and sent to a Siberian labour camp in March 1945.

=== Later life ===
Following the war, Hahn used her long-hidden Jewish identity card to reclaim her true identity. The Soviet Military Administration in Germany, in need of trained lawyers, installed her as a judge at the Brandenburg district court. Hahn pleaded with the Soviet occupation authorities to free Vetter, and he was released in 1947, but their marriage ended shortly afterward. Vetter died in 2002.

While serving as judge, Hahn came under pressure by the Soviet rulers to act as an informant for the KGB. Openly rejecting that suggestion would have placed her in serious danger. Hahn thus decided to flee with her daughter to London, where her sisters had settled after seeking refuge in the British Mandate of Palestine at the onset of the war. In London, Hahn worked as a housemaid and a corset designer.

In 1957, she married Fred Beer, a Jewish jewellery merchant, and they remained married until his death in 1984. After Beer's death, Hahn emigrated to Israel and lived in Netanya until returning to London, where she lived for the last few years of her life. She died in London, in 2009.

== Archive ==
In December 1997, a collection of Hahn's personal papers was sold at auction for $169,250. The collection, known as the Edith Hahn Archive, was donated to the United States Holocaust Memorial Museum.

== Works ==
- Hahn Beer, Edith; Dworkin, Susan (1999). The Nazi Officer's Wife: How One Jewish Woman Survived the Holocaust. Little, Brown & Company.
