= Audie Award for Short Stories or Collections =

The Audie Award for Short Stories or Collections is one of the Audie Awards presented annually by the Audio Publishers Association (APA). It awards excellence in narration, production, and content for an audiobook collection of short stories released in a given year. From 2000 to 2001 it was given as the Audie Award for Short Stories, Essays, or Collections. It has been awarded since 2000.

== Winners and finalists ==
=== 2000s ===
Year	Audiobook	Author(s)	Narrator(s)	Publisher	Result	Ref.
2000 5th	Malice Domestic: An Anthology of Original Traditional Mystery Stories (1997)	Anne Perry et al.	Patrick Macnee, Juliet Mills, Judy Geeson, Christopher Cazenove, Stephanie Beacham, Reed Diamond, and William Windom	NewStar Media	Winner	
2000 5th	Goodbye, Columbus and Five Short Stories (1993)	Philip Roth	Theodore Bikel, Harlan Ellison, Elliott Gould, John Rubinstein, and Jerry Zaks	NewStar Media	Finalist	
2000 5th	Zoe Caldwell reads Oscar Wilde Fairy Tales (1999)	Oscar Wilde	Christopher Plummer and Zoe Caldwell	NYS Theatre Institute/Family Classic Audio Books	Finalist	
2001 6th	Ten by Maugham (2000)	W. Somerset Maugham	Full cast	KCRW	Winner	
2001 6th	High: Stories of Survival from Everest and K2 (1998)	Clint Willis	Eric Conger, George Guidall, Simon Prebble, and Alan Sklar	Listen & Live Audio	Finalist	
2001 6th	Me Talk Pretty One Day (2000)	David Sedaris	David Sedaris	Time Warner AudioBooks	Finalist	
2002 7th	Blood: Stories of Life and Death from the Civil War (2000)	Ulysses S. Grant et al.	Christopher Graybill, Colleen Delany, Grover Gardner, Barrett Whitener, and Delores King Williams	Listen & Live Audio	Winner	
2002 7th	Stories of F. Scott Fitzgerald (1989)	F. Scott Fitzgerald	Robert Sean Leonard, Peter Gallagher, Blythe Danner, Eric Stoltz, Martha Plimpton, Dylan Baker, Parker Posey, Bill Irwin, and Campbell Scott	HarperAudio	Finalist	
2002 7th	Texas Bound IV (2001)	Kay Cattarulla	Marcia Gay Harden, Larry Hagman, and Judith Ivey	Arts & Letters Live/Southern Methodist University Press	Finalist	
2003 8th	Classic Women's Short Stories (1994)	Katherine Mansfield, Kate Chopin, and Virginia Woolf	Carole Boyd, Liza Ross, and Teresa Gallagher	Naxos Audiobooks	Winner	
2003 8th	Classic Chinese Short Stories (vol. 1) (2003)	Feng Meng-lung, Lin Yu Tang, P'u Sung-ling, et al.	Charlton Griffin	Audio Connoisseur	Finalist	
2003 8th	In the Ravine & Other Short Stories (1900)	Anton Chekhov	Kenneth Branagh	Naxos Audiobooks	Finalist	
2003 8th	My Man Jeeves (1919)	P. G. Wodehouse	Martin Jarvis	Audio Partners	Finalist	
2003 8th	The Copper Peacock and Other Stories (1991)	Ruth Rendell	Penelope Keith	BBC Audiobooks America	Finalist	
2004 9th	Home on the Prairie: Stories from Lake Wobegon (2003)	Garrison Keillor	Garrison Keillor	HighBridge Audio	Winner	
2004 9th	Classic Chinese Short Stories (vol. 2) (2004)	Yuan Chen, Lien Pu, Hsieh Liang, Mao Tun, and Feng Meng-lung	Charlton Griffin	Audio Connoisseur	Finalist	
2004 9th	Drinking Coffee Elsewhere (2003)	ZZ Packer	Shirley Jordan	HighBridge Audio	Finalist	
2004 9th	Shepherds Abiding (2003)	Jan Karon	John McDonough	Penguin Audiobooks	Finalist	
2004 9th	The John Cheever Audio Collection (2003)	John Cheever	John Cheever, Blythe Danner, Peter Gallagher, Edward Herrmann, George Plimpton, and Meryl Streep	Caedmon/HarperAudio	Finalist	
2005 10th	Dress Your Family in Corduroy and Denim (2004)	David Sedaris	David Sedaris	Time Warner AudioBooks	Winner	
2005 10th	Chain of Command (2004)	Seymour M. Hersh	Peter Friedman and Seymour Hersh	HarperAudio	Finalist	
2005 10th	Heavenly Date and Other Flirtations (1995)	Alexander McCall Smith	Simon Prebble, Lisette Lecat, and Susan Lyons	Recorded Books	Finalist	
2005 10th	The Short Stories of W. S. Maugham, Vol. 3 (2004)	W. Somerset Maugham	Charlton Griffin	Audio Connoisseur	Finalist	
2005 10th	Twisted (2003)	Jeffery Deaver	Boyd Gaines, Michele Pawk, and Frederick Weller	Simon & Schuster Audio	Finalist	
2006 11th	Runaway (2004)	Alice Munro	Kymberly Dakin	BBC Audiobooks America	Winner	
2006 11th	Facts Behind the Helsinki Roccamatios (1990)	Yann Martel	Jeff Woodman, Johnny Stange, Randolph Jones, Barbara Caruso, and David Ledoux	HighBridge Audio	Finalist	
2006 11th	Fairy Tales (TBD)	Hans Christian Andersen (trans. Tina Nunnally)	Kate Reading and Richard Matthews	Penguin Audiobooks	Finalist	
2006 11th	The Girl Who Married a Lion (2004)	Alexander McCall Smith	Davina Porter, Lisette Lecat, Steven Crossley, Danai Gurira, and Nyambi Nyambi	Recorded Books	Finalist	
2006 11th	The Noël Coward Collection (2007)	Noël Coward	Noël Coward, Simon Jones, and Margaret Leighton	HarperAudio	Finalist	
2007 12th	This I Believe (2006)	Jay Allison and Dan Gediman	Bill Gates, Martha Graham, et al.	Audio Renaissance	Winner	
2007 12th	Fragile Things (2006)	Neil Gaiman	Neil Gaiman	HarperAudio	Finalist	
2007 12th	A Grown-Up's Halloween (2006)	Yuri Rasovsky	Yuri Rasovsky	Blackstone Audio	Finalist	
2007 12th	Paris Stories (2002)	Mavis Gallant	Lorna Raver and Yuri Rasovsky	Blackstone Audio	Finalist	
2007 12th	The Turning (2005)	Tim Winton	Humphrey Bower and Caroline Lee	Bolinda Audio	Finalist	
2008 13th	20th Century Ghosts (2005)	Joe Hill	David Ledoux	HarperAudio	Winner	
2008 13th	Big Country (2007)	Louis L'Amour	Stefan Rudnicki	Blackstone Audio	Finalist	
2008 13th	Grace Under Fire (2007)	Andrew Carroll	Patrick Lawlor	Tantor Audio	Finalist	
2008 13th	Growing Up Ethnic in America (1999)	Maria Mazziotti Gillan et al.	Full cast	Penguin Audio	Finalist	
2008 13th	Selected Readings from The Portable Dorothy Parker (2006)	Marion Meade	Lorna Raver	Blackstone Audio	Finalist	
2009 14th	Armageddon in Retrospect (2008)	Kurt Vonnegut	Rip Torn and Michael Vonnegut	Penguin Audio	Winner	
2009 14th	Fine Just the Way It Is (2008)	Annie Proulx	Will Patton	Simon & Schuster Audio	Finalist	
2009 14th	The Bandana Republic (2008)	Louis Reyes Rivera and Bruce George	Full cast	Audible	Finalist	
2009 14th	This I Believe II (2004)	Jay Allison and Dan Gediman	Full cast	Macmillan Audio	Finalist	
2009 14th	When You Are Engulfed in Flames (2008)	David Sedaris	David Sedaris	Hachette Audio	Finalist	

=== 2010s ===
Year	Audiobook	Author(s)	Narrator(s)	Publisher	Result	Ref.
2010 15th	Black Magazine Audio Magazine (Vol. 1) (2009)	Hugh B. Cave, Paul Cain, Frederick Nebel, Reuben J. Shay, Dashiell Hammett, and William Cole	Full cast	Blackstone Audio	Winner	
2010 15th	The Complete Stories of Sherlock Holmes, Vol. 1 (1887–1927)	Arthur Conan Doyle	Charlton Griffin	Audio Connoisseur	Finalist	
2010 15th	Just After Sunset (2008)	Stephen King	Stephen King, Jill Eikenberry, Holter Graham, George Guidall, Ron McLarty, Denis O'Hare, and full cast	Simon & Schuster Audio	Finalist	
2010 15th	Love Letters of Great Men (vol. 2) (2008)	Ursula Doyle	Anton Lesser	Macmillan Audio	Finalist	
2010 15th	Nothing with Strings (2008)	Bailey White	Lorna River	Tantor Audio	Finalist	
2011 16th	Stories: All-New Tales (2010)	Neil Gaiman	Anne Bobby, Jonathan Davis, Peter Francis James, Katherine Kellgren, and Euan Morton	HarperAudio	Winner	
2011 16th	A Matter of Matter (1949)	L. Ron Hubbard	Corey Burton, R. F. Daley, Jim Meskimen, Tait Ruppert, and Josh Thompson	Galaxy Press	Finalist	
2011 16th	And Thereby Hangs a Tale (2010)	Jeffrey Archer	Gerard Doyle	Macmillan Audio	Finalist	
2011 16th	How Did You Get This Number (2010)	Sloane Crosley	Sloane Crosley	Penguin Audio	Finalist	
2011 16th	Ford County (2009)	John Grisham	John Grisham	Random House Audio	Finalist	
2011 16th	A Touch of Dead (2009)	Charlaine Harris	Johanna Parker	Recorded Books	Finalist	
2011 16th	Long After Midnight (1976)	Ray Bradbury	Michael Prichard	Tantor Audio	Finalist	
2012 17th	Selected Shorts: New American Stories (2011)	Aleksandar Hemon, Jhumpa Lahiri, Chimamanda Ngozi Adichie, and Sherman Alexie	Boyd Gaines, Rita Wolf, Condola Rashad, and BD Wong	Symphony Space	Winner	
2012 17th	Black Mask Stories (Vol. 1) (2011)	Keith Alan Deutsch, Erle Stanley Gardner, Dashiell Hammett, George Harmon Coxe, Frederick Nebel, and Lester Dent	Full cast	HighBridge Audio	Finalist	
2012 17th	Bullfighting (2011)	Roddy Doyle	Lorcan Cranitch	AudioGO	Finalist	
2012 17th	The Collected Stories of Eudora Welty (1980)	Eudora Welty	Barbara Rosenblat, Gabra Zackman, Marc Vietor, Kevin Pariseau, L. J. Ganser, Katherine Kellgren, Allyson Johnson, Victor Bevine, Elisabeth Rodgers, Jonathan Davis, Oliver Wyman, Jeremy Gage, Eileen Stevens, Joe Barrett, Jessica Almasy, Khristine Hvam, Suzanne Toren, Gayle Hendriz, and Mark Boyett	Audible	Finalist	
2012 17th	The Yellow Wallpaper and Other Stories (1892–1914)	Charlotte Perkins Gilman	Kirsten Potter	Tantor Audio	Finalist	
2012 17th	You Known When the Men Are Gone (2011)	Siobhan Fallon	Cassandra Campbell	Tantor Audio	Finalist	
2013 18th	Astray (2012)	Emma Donoghue	Khristine Hvam, James Langton, Robert Petkoff, Suzanne Toren, and Dion Graham	Hachette Audio	Winner	
2013 18th	I Am an Executioner (2012)	Rajesh Parameswaran	Neil Shah and Lina Patel	Dreamscape Media	Finalist	
2013 18th	Slouching Towards Bethlehem (1968)	Joan Didion	Diane Keaton	Audible	Finalist	
2013 18th	Welcome to Bordertown (2011)	Holly Black and Ellen Kushner	Holly Black, Ellen Kushner, Cassandra Campbell, and MacLeod Andrews	Brilliance Audio	Finalist	
2013 18th	When It Happens to You (2012)	Molly Ringwald	Molly Ringwald	HarperAudio	Finalist	
2014 19th	Sherlock Holmes in America (2009)	Jon L. Lellenberg, Martin H. Greenberg, and Daniel Stashower	Graeme Malcolm	Audible	Winner	
2014 19th	The Ballad of the Sad Café (1951)	Carson McCullers	David Ledoux, Joe Barrett, Thérèse Plummer, Kevin Pariseau, Suzanne Toren, Edoardo Ballerini, and Barbara Rosenblat	Audible	Finalist	
2014 19th	The Cage Keeper and Other Stories (1989)	Andre Dubus III	Andre Dubus III	Blackstone Audio	Finalist	
2014 19th	Nine Inches (2013)	Tom Perrotta	William Dufris, Andi Arndt, Tom Perrotta, and Rupert Degas	Macmillan Audio	Finalist	
2014 19th	Nothing Gold Can Stay (2013)	Ron Rash	Alexander Cendese, Robert Petkoff, Prentice Onayemi, Christian Baskous, and Phoebe Strole	HarperAudio	Finalist	
2014 19th	We Live in Water (2013)	Jess Walter	Edoardo Ballerini and Jess Walter	HarperAudio	Finalist	
2015 20th	The Assassination of Margaret Thatcher (2014)	Hilary Mantel	Jane Carr	Macmillan Audio	Winner	
2015 20th	Dangerous Women (2014)	George R. R. Martin and Gardner Dozois	Claudia Black, Scott Brick, Karen Dotrice, Jonathan Frakes, Iain Glen, Janis Ian, Stana Katic, Inna Korobkina, Jenna Lamia, Lee Meriwether, Emily Rankin, Maggi-Meg Reed, Fred Sanders, Allan Scott-Douglas, Sophie Turner, Harriet Walter, and Jake Weber	Penguin Random House Audio	Finalist	
2015 20th	Faceoff (2014)	Linwood Barclay, Steve Berry, Lee Child, Lincoln Child, Michael Connelly, Jeffery Deaver, Linda Fairstein, Joseph Finder, Lisa Gardner, Heather Graham, Peter James, Raymond Khoury, Dennis Lehane, John Lescroart, Steve Martini, T. Jefferson Parker, Douglas Preston, Ian Rankin, James Rollins, M. J. Rose, John Sandford, R. L. Stine, and F. Paul Wilson	Dylan Baker, Dennis Boutsikaris, Jeremy Bobb, Daniel Gerroll, January LaVoy, and David Baldacci	Simon & Schuster Audio	Finalist	
2015 20th	Heroes, Gods and Monsters of the Greek Myths (1966)	Bernard Evslin	Todd Haberkorn	Graymalkin Media	Finalist	
2015 20th	The Legend of Drizzt (1988–2014)	R. A. Salvatore	Dan Harmon, Danny Pudi, Al Yankovic, Felicia Day, Greg Grunberg, Melissa Rauch, Michael Chiklis, Sean Astin, Tom Felton, David Duchovny, Ice T, and Wil Wheaton	Audible	Finalist	
2015 20th	The Wily O'Reilly (2014)	Patrick Taylor	John Keating	Macmillan Audio	Finalist	
2016 21st	—N/a	—N/a	—N/a	—N/a	—N/a	
2017 22nd	The Brink (2015)	Austin Bunn	Austin Bunn, Luke Daniels, Tanya Eby, Talph Lister, Amy McFadden, Mikael Naramore, and Nick Podehl	Blunder Woman Productions (via ACX)	Winner	
2017 22nd	Certain Dark Things (2015)	M. J. Pack	Jacob York	Audible	Finalist	
2017 22nd	Coffee at Luke's (2007)	Jennifer Crusie	Colby Elliott	Last Word Audio	Finalist	
2017 22nd	The Collected Stories of Arthur C. Clarke (2001)	Arthur C. Clarke	Ray Porter, Jonathan Davis, and Ralph Lister	Audible	Finalist	
2017 22nd	East, West (1994)	Salman Rushdie	Sunil Malhotra and Steven Crossley	Recorded Books	Finalist	
2017 22nd	Killer Women (2016)	Louise Millar, Alex Marwood, and Tammy Cohen	Clare Corbett, Adjoa Andoh, Rachel Atkins, and Carl Prekopp	Audible	Finalist	
2018 23rd	The Language of Thorns (2017)	Leigh Bardugo	Lauren Fortgang	Audible	Winner	
2018 23rd	Difficult Women (2017)	Roxane Gay	Robin Miles	Audible	Finalist	
2018 23rd	Good Behavior (2016)	Blake Crouch	Blake Crouch and Julia Whelan	Brilliance Audio	Finalist	
2018 23rd	Tales of Ordinary Madness (1972)	Charles Bukowski	Will Patton	Audible	Finalist	
2018 23rd	You Don't Have to Say You Love Me (2017)	Sherman Alexie	Sherman Alexie	Hachette Audio Books	Finalist	
2019 24th	Heads of the Colored People (2019)	Nafissa Thompson-Spires	Adenrele Ojo	HighBridge Audio (Recorded Books)	Winner	
2019 24th	Eveningland (2017)	Michael Knight	Scott Sowers	Recorded Books	Finalist	
2019 24th	The Flame (2018)	Leonard Cohen	Margaret Atwood, Seth Rogen, Michael Shannon, Will Patton, Rodney Crowell, John Doe, Jim Fletcher, Ari Fliakos, Maggie Hoffman, Ross Marquand, and Neela Vaswani	Macmillan Audio	Finalist	
2019 24th	The Grass Harp (1951)	Truman Capote	Cody Roberts	Tantor Audio	Finalist	
2019 24th	You Think It, I'll Say It (2018)	Curtis Sittenfeld	Emily Rankin and Mark Deakins	Penguin Random House Audio	Finalist	

=== 2020s ===
Year	Audiobook	Author(s)	Narrator(s)	Publisher	Result	Ref.
2020 25th	Full Throttle (2019)	Joe Hill	Zachary Quinto, Wil Wheaton, Kate Mulgrew, Neil Gaiman, Ashleigh Cummings, Joe Hill, Laysla De Oliveira, Nate Corddry, Connor Jessup, Stephen Lang, and George Guidall	HarperAudio	Winner	
2020 25th	Evidence of the Affair (2018)	Taylor Jenkins Reid	Julia Whelan, George Newbern, James Daniels, and Dara Rosenberg	Brilliance Audio	Finalist	
2020 25th	Forward (2019)	Veronica Roth, Blake Crouch, N. K. Jemisin, Amor Towles, Paul Tremblay, and Andy Weir	Evan Rachel Wood, Rosa Salazar, Jason Isaacs, David Harbour, Steven Strait, and Janina Gavankar	Brilliance Audio	Finalist	
2020 25th	I'm Telling the Truth but I'm Lying (2019)	Bassey Ikpi	Bassey Ikpi	HarperAudio	Finalist	
2020 25th	Kabu Kabu (2013)	Nnedi Okorafor and Whoopi Goldberg	Yetide Badaki	Tantor Audio (Recorded Books)	Finalist	
2021 26th	The Chekhov Collection of Short Stories (2020)	Anton Chekhov	Richard Armitage	Audible	Winner	
2021 26th	Burnt Tongues (2014)	Neil Krolicki, Chris Lewis Carter, Gayle Towell, Tony Liebhard, Michael De Vito, Jr., Tyler Jones, Phil Jourdan, Richard Lemmer, Amanda Gowin, Matt Egan, Fred Venturini, Brandon Tietz, Adam Skorupskas, Bryan Howie, Brien Piechos, Jason M. Fylon, Terence James Eeles, Keith Bule, Gus Moreno, and Daniel W. Broallt	Christopher David, Jordan Killam, Pete Cross, Cady Zuckerman, Nick Mondelli, David Bendena, Pat Grimes, Mark Owen, Kat Rose-Martin, Chris Andrew Ciulla, Katherine Littrell, James Patrick Cronin, Timothy Andrés Pabon, Cary Hite, Qarie Marshall, Jack Meloche, Thom Rivera, Steve West, Steve Wojtas, Tanya Eby, and Patrick Lawlor	Dreamscape	Finalist	
2021 26th	Inquire Within (2020)	IN-Q	IN-Q	HarperAudio	Finalist	
2021 26th	Inside Jobs: Tales from a Time of Quarantine (2020)	Ben H. Winters	Scott Aiello, Kevin T. Collins, and Ellen Archer	Audible Originals	Finalist	
2021 26th	Minor Feelings: An Asian American Reckoning (2020)	Cathy Park Hong	Cathy Park Hong	Penguin Random House Audio	Finalist	
2022 27th	Blackout (2021)	Dhonielle Clayton, Tiffany D. Jackson, Nic Stone, Angie Thomas, Ashley Woodfolk, and Nicola Yoon	Joniece Abbott-Pratt, Dion Graham, Imani Parks, Jordan Cobb, Shayna Small, A.J. Beckles, and Bahni Turpin	HarperAudio	Winner	
2022 27th	The Best American Short Stories 2021	Jesmyn Ward and Heidi Pitlor (editors)	Lisa Flanagan et al.	HMH Audio (HarperCollins)	Finalist	
2022 27th	Binge	Douglas Coupland	Douglas Coupland et al.	Penguin Random House Canada	Finalist	
2022 27th	How It Ends	Rachel Howzell Hall	Joniece Abbott-Pratt	Audible Originals	Finalist	
2022 27th	Lyrics for Rock Stars	Heather Mateus Sappenfield	Michael Crouch	V Press LC	Finalist	
2023 28th	Getaway	Sally Hepworth, Zakiya Dalila Harris, Catherine Steadman, Luanne Rice, Jess Lourey, and Rumaan Alam	Candice Moll, Shayna Small, Samara Naeymi, Jennifer Jill Araya, Carly Robins, and Fajer Al-Kaisi	Brilliance Publishing	Winner	
2023 28th	Generation Wonder	Barry Lyga and others	Emily Lawrence, Jaime Lincoln Smith, Sarah Naughton, Mark Sanderlin, Ron Butler, James Anderson Foster, Jennifer Aquino, Tim Campbell, Jeanette Illidge, Ariana Delawari, Frankie Corzo, Kenny Ramos, and Eunice Wong	Blackstone Audio	Finalist	
2023 28th	Giving the Devil His Due: A Charity Anthology	Rebecca Brewer (ed.) Writers: Lee Murray, Jason Sanford, Peter Tieryas, Kelley Armstrong, Kenesha Williams, Linda D. Addison, Christina Henry, Hillary Monahan, Nisi Shawl, Leanna Renee Hieber, Kaaron Warren, Stephen Graham Jones, Errick Nunnally, Angela Yuriko Smith, Dana Cameron, and Nicholas Kaufmann	Alyssa Bresnahan, Brian Nishii, Christina Moore, Cynthia Farrell, Edoardo Ballerini, Erin Moon, Karen Chilton, Kate Forbes, Nancy Wu, Robin Miles, Samuel Roukin, and Stephanie Cozart	The Pixel Project	Finalist	
2023 28th	Marriage: From the Feminine Perspective	Christine Mascott (ed.)	Christine Mascott	Christine Mascott	Finalist	
2023 28th	Rebent Sinner	Ivan Coyote	Ivan Coyote	ECW Press Ltd.	Finalist	
2024 29th	Wild and Precious: A Celebration of Mary Oliver	Mary Oliver, with the contributions by Sophia Bush, Ross Gay, Samin Nosrat, Rainn Wilson, and Susan Cain	Sophia Bush	HarperAudio	Winner	
2024 29th	The Adventures of Finn MacCool & Other Irish Folk Tales	Liam Gerrard (editor)	Liam Gerrard	Raconteurs Audio	Finalist	
2024 29th	The Best American Short Stories 2023 (2023)	Min Jin Lee and Heidi Pitlor	Laura Copland, Jeena Yi, and a full cast	HarperAudio	Finalist	
2024 29th	A Guest at the Feast	Colm Tóibín	Colm Tóibín	Simon & Schuster Audio	Finalist	
2024 29th	Obsession Collection	Nita Prose, B.A. Paris, Minka Kent, Julie Clark, Chris Bohjalian, and Alyssa Cole	Susan Dalian, Kimberly Woods, and a full cast	Brilliance Publishing	Finalist	
2025 30th	You Like It Darker: Stories	Stephen King	Will Patton with Stephen King, afterword read by Sean Patrick Hopkins	Simon & Schuster Audio	Winner	
2025 30th	Glory Days	Simon Rich	John Tóibín	Hachette Audio	Finalist	
2025 30th	The History of Sound	Ben Shattuck	Ben Shattuck, Zachary Chastain, and a full cast	Penguin Random House Audio	Finalist	
2025 30th	Letters from Klara	Tove Jansson	Indira Varma	Saga Egmont	Finalist	
2025 30th	What If We Get It Right?	Ayana Elizabeth Johnson	Ayana Elizabeth Johnson	Penguin Random House Audio	Finalist	
2026 31st	Food for Thought	Alton Brown	Alton Brown	Simon & Schuster Audio	Winner	
2026 31st	Alibis	Freida McFadden, Sally Hepworth, David Lagercrantz, Chris Bohjalian, Chad Zunker, and Wanda M. Morris	Lauryn Allman, Anthea Greco, Graham Halstead, Eric Altheide, Soneela Nankani, Pete Simonelli, Amara Jasper, and Susannah Jones	Brilliance Publishing	Finalist	
2026 31st	Animal Bodies: On Death, Desire, and Other Difficulties	Suzanne Roberts	Julia Whelan	Audiobrary	Finalist	
2026 31st	The End of the World as We Know It: New Tales of Stephen King's The Stand	Christopher Golden and Brian Keene (eds.)	Sean Patrick Hopkins and Adenrele Ojo	Simon & Schuster Audio	Finalist	
2026 31st	The Illustrated Man (1951)	Ray Bradbury	Prentice Onayemi, Ari Fliakos, and Marin Ireland	Simon & Schuster Audio	Finalist	
2026 31st	Notes to John (2025)	Joan Didion	Julianne Moore	Penguin Random House Audio	Finalist	
