= Audie Award for Literary Fiction & Classics =

The Audie Award for Literary Fiction & Classics is one of the Audie Awards presented annually by the Audio Publishers Association (APA). It awards excellence in narration, production, and content for an audiobook adaptation released in a given year of a work of literary fiction or a classic. Before 2016 this was given as two distinct awards, the Audie Award for Classics (awarded since 2001, before 2003 as the Audie Award for Classics, Fiction) and the Audie Award for Literary Fiction (awarded since 2005).

== Literary Fiction & Classics winners and finalists ==
=== 2010s ===
| Year | Title | Author(s) | Narrator(s) | Publisher | Result | Ref. |
|---|---|---|---|---|---|---|
| 2016 21st | Little Big Man (1964) | Thomas Berger | Scott Sowers and David Aaron Baker | Recorded Books | Winner | |
| 2016 21st | The Fishermen (2015) | Chigozie Obioma | Chukwudi Iwuji | Hachette Audio | Finalist | |
| 2016 21st | Kidnapped (1886) | Robert Louis Stevenson | Kieron Elliott | Recorded Books | Finalist | |
| 2016 21st | Sweetland (2014) | Michael Crummey | John Lee | HighBridge Audio/Recorded Books | Finalist | |
| 2016 21st | Til the Well Runs Dry (2014) | Lauren Francis-Sharma | Ron Butler and Bahni Turpin | Tantor Audio | Finalist | |
| 2017 22nd | Homegoing (2016) | Yaa Gyasi | Dominic Hoffman | Penguin Random House Audio/Books on Tape | Winner | |
| 2017 22nd | Alice's Adventures in Wonderland (1864) | Lewis Carroll | Scarlett Johansson | Audible | Finalist | |
| 2017 22nd | Another Brooklyn (2016) | Jacqueline Woodson | Robert Miles | HarperAudio | Finalist | |
| 2017 22nd | David Copperfield (1850) | Charles Dickens | Richard Armitage | Audible | Finalist | |
| 2017 22nd | LaRose (2016) | Louise Erdrich | Louise Erdrich | HarperAudio | Finalist | |
| 2017 22nd | The Underground Railroad (2016) | Colson Whitehead | Bahni Turpin | Penguin Random House Audio/Books on Tape | Finalist | |
| 2018 23rd | House of Names (2017) | Colm Tóibín | Juliet Stevenson et al. | Simon & Schuster Audio | Winner | |
| 2018 23rd | Beast (2016) | Paul Kingsnorth | Simon Vance | Tantor Audio | Finalist | |
| 2018 23rd | Daisy Miller (1878) | Henry James | Kitty Hendrix | Spoken Realms | Finalist | |
| 2018 23rd | Dracula (1897) | Bram Stoker | Nick Sandys | Brilliance Audio | Finalist | |
| 2018 23rd | The Handmaid's Tale: Special Edition (1985) | Margaret Atwood and Valerie Martin | Claire Danes, Margaret Atwood, and a full cast | Audible | Finalist | |
| 2018 23rd | Phineas Finn (1869) | Anthony Trollope | David Shaw-Parker | Naxos AudioBooks | Finalist | |
| 2019 24th | Bleak House (1853) | Charles Dickens | Miriam Margolyes | Audible | Winner | |
| 2019 24th | Crime and Punishment (1866) | Fyodor Dostoevsky | James Anderson Foster | Brilliance Audio | Finalist | |
| 2019 24th | Housegirl (2018) | Michael Donkor | Adjoa Andoh | Macmillan Audio | Finalist | |
| 2019 24th | Miguel Street (1959) | V. S. Naipaul | Ron Butler | Blackstone Audio | Finalist | |
| 2019 24th | Musashi (1935) | Eiji Yoshikawa | Brian Nishii | Blackstone Audio | Finalist | |
| 2019 24th | Split Tooth (2018) | Tanya Tagaq | Tanya Tagaq | Penguin Random House Canada | Finalist | |

=== 2020s ===
| Year | Title | Author(s) | Narrator(s) | Publisher | Result | Ref. |
|---|---|---|---|---|---|---|
| 2020 25th | The Water Dancer | Ta-Nehisi Coates | Joe Morton | Penguin Random House Audio | Winner | |
| 2020 25th | Milkman | Anna Burns | Brid Brennan | Dreamscape Media | Finalist | |
| 2020 25th | Mythos | Stephen Fry | Stephen Fry | Chronicle Books | Finalist | |
| 2020 25th | The Night Tiger | Yangsze Choo | Yangsze Choo | Macmillan Audio | Finalist | |
| 2020 25th | Red at the Bone | Jacqueline Woodson | Jacqueline Woodson, with Quincy Tyler Bernstine, Peter Francis James, Shayna Small, and Bahni Turpin | Penguin Random House Audio | Finalist | |
| 2021 26th | The Death of Vivek Oji | Akwaeke Emezi | Yetide Badaki and Chukwudi Iwuji | Penguin Random House Audio | Winner | |
| 2021 26th | The Color Purple | Alice Walker | Samira Wiley | Audible Studios | Finalist | |
| 2021 26th | Deacon King Kong | James McBride | Dominic Hoffman | Penguin Random House Audio | Finalist | |
| 2021 26th | Pew | Catherine Lacey | Bahni Turpin | Brilliance Publishing | Finalist | |
| 2021 26th | These Ghosts Are Family | Maisy Card | Karl O'Brian Williams | Simon & Schuster Audio | Finalist | |
| 2022 27th | All Creatures Great and Small | James Herriot | Nicholas Ralph | Macmillan Audio | Winner | |
| 2022 27th | Ariadne | Jennifer Saint | Barrie Kreinik | Macmillan Audio | Finalist | |
| 2022 27th | Mary Jane | Jessica Anya Blau | Caitlin Kinnunen | HarperAudio | Finalist | |
| 2022 27th | Matrix (2021) | Lauren Groff | Adjoa Andoh | Penguin Random House Audio | Finalist | |
| 2022 27th | Moby Dick (1851) | Herman Melville | Jonathan Epstein | Alison Larkin Presents | Finalist | |
| 2023 28th | War and Peace (1869) | Leo Tolstoy, trans. by Aylmer and Louise Maude | Thandiwe Newton | Audible Studios | Winner | |
| 2023 28th | Flaubert's Parrot (1984) | Julian Barnes | Simon Vance | Recorded Books | Finalist | |
| 2023 28th | Horse | Geraldine Brooks | James Fouhey, Lisa Flanagan, Graham Halstead, Katherine Littrell, and Michael Obiora | Penguin Random House | Finalist | |
| 2023 28th | The Hunchback of Notre-Dame (1831) | Victor Hugo, trans. by Isabel Florence Hapgood | Simon Vance | Oasis Audio | Finalist | |
| 2023 28th | Yerba Buena | Nina LaCour | Julia Whelan | Macmillan Audio | Finalist | |
| 2024 29th | The Iliad (c. 8th century BC) | Homer, translated by Emily Wilson | Audra McDonald | Audible Studios | Winner | |
| 2024 29th | Harold and Maude (1971) | Colin Higgins | Barbara Rosenblat | Blackstone Publishing | Finalist | |
| 2024 29th | The Quest of the Silver Fleece | W.E.B. Du Bois | Bahni Turpin | Blackstone Publishing with Skyboat Media | Finalist | |
| 2024 29th | The Making of Another Major Motion Picture Masterpiece | Tom Hanks | Tom Hanks, with a full cast | Penguin Random House Audio | Finalist | |
| 2024 29th | Oliver Twist (1837–1839) | Charles Dickens, adapted by Marty Ross, presented by Sam Mendes | Brian Cox, Daniel Kaluuya, and a full cast | Audible Studios | Finalist | |
| 2025 30th | James (2024) | Percival Everett | Dominic Hoffman | Penguin Random House Audio | Winner | |
| 2025 30th | Devil Is Fine | John Vercher | Dion Graham | Macmillan Audio | Finalist | |
| 2025 30th | Martyr! (2024) | Kaveh Akbar | Arian Moayed | Penguin Random House Audio | Finalist | |
| 2025 30th | The Mighty Red | Louise Erdrich | Marin Graham | HarperCollins Publishers | Finalist | |
| 2025 30th | Pachinko (2017) | Min Jin Lee | Sandra Oh | Hachette Audio | Finalist | |
| 2026 31st | The Director | Daniel Kehlmann | Nicholas Boulton | Simon & Schuster Audio | Winner | |
| 2026 31st | 33 Place Brugmann | Alice Austen | Shiromi Arserio, Jilly Bond, Nicholas Boulton, Billie Fulford-Brown, Danielle Cohen, Raphael Corkhill, Matthew Lloyd Davies, James Meunier, Joshua Riley, and Simon Slater | Simon & Schuster Audio | Finalist | |
| 2026 31st | The Emperor of Gladness (2025) | Ocean Vuong | James Aaron Oh | Penguin Random House Audio | Finalist | |
| 2026 31st | Reports of His Death Have Been Greatly Exaggerated | James Goodhand | Peter Noble | Harlequin Audio | Finalist | |
| 2026 31st | So Far Gone | Jess Walter | Edoardo Ballerini | HarperAudio | Finalist | |
| 2026 31st | The Sound and the Fury (1929) | William Faulkner | Edoardo Ballerini, Shaun Taylor-Corbett, Bronson Pinchot, and Robin Miles | Blackstone Publishing | Finalist | |

== Classics winners and finalists 2001–2015 ==
=== 2000s ===
| Year | Title | Author(s) | Narrator(s) | Publisher | Result | Ref. |
|---|---|---|---|---|---|---|
| 2001 6th | Complete Short Stories of William Somerset Maugham, Volume I (1899–1952) | W. Somerset Maugham | Charlton Griffin | Audio Connoisseur | Winner | |
| 2001 6th | Invisible Man (1952) | Ralph Ellison | Peter Francis James | Recorded Books | Finalist | |
| 2001 6th | Their Eyes Were Watching God (1937) | Zora Neale Hurston | Ruby Dee | HarperAudio | Finalist | |
| 2002 7th | A Tree Grows in Brooklyn (1943) | Betty Smith | Stacy Keach | HarperAudio | Winner | |
| 2002 7th | The Crucible (1953) | Arthur Miller | Stacy Keach, Michael York, Fionnula Flanagan, Madolyn Smith, and René Auberjonois | L.A. Theatre Works | Finalist | |
| 2002 7th | Gone with the Wind (1936) | Margaret Mitchell | Linda Stephens | Recorded Books | Finalist | |
| 2003 8th | Complete Short Stories of William Somerset Maugham, Volume II (1899–1952) | W. Somerset Maugham | Charlton Griffin | Audio Connoisseur | Winner | |
| 2003 8th | Ernest Hemingway: The Short Stories, Volume I (1923–1969) | Ernest Hemingway | Stacy Keach | Simon & Schuster Audio | Finalist | |
| 2003 8th | Moby-Dick (1851) | Herman Melville | Paul Boehmer | Books on Tape | Finalist | |
| 2003 8th | Spoon River Anthology (1915) | Edgar Lee Masters | Patrick Fraley, Edward Asner, and full cast | The Audio Partners Publishing | Finalist | |
| 2003 8th | The Great Gatsby (1925) | F. Scott Fitzgerald | Tim Robbins | HarperAudio | Finalist | |
| 2004 9th | East of Eden (1952) | John Steinbeck | Richard Poe | Recorded Books | Winner | |
| 2004 9th | The Bell Jar (1953) | Sylvia Plath | Maggie Gyllenhaal | HarperAudio | Finalist | |
| 2004 9th | Ernest Hemingway: The Short Stories, Volume II (1923–1969) | Ernest Hemingway | Stacy Keach | Simon & Schuster Audio | Finalist | |
| 2004 9th | Treasure Island (1883) | Robert Louis Stevenson | Richard Matthews | Books on Tape | Finalist | |
| 2004 9th | Wuthering Heights (1847) | Emily Brontë | Donada Peters | Books on Tape | Finalist | |
| 2005 10th | A Christmas Carol (1843) | Charles Dickens | Jim Dale | Listening Library | Winner | |
| 2005 10th | Bless Me, Ultima (1972) | Rudolfo Anaya | Robert Ramirez | Recorded Book | Finalist | |
| 2005 10th | The Egyptian (1945) | Mika Waltari | Charlton Griffin | Audio Connoisseur | Finalist | |
| 2005 10th | The Heart Is a Lonely Hunter (1940) | Carson McCullers | Cherry Jones | HarperAudio | Finalist | |
| 2005 10th | Ulysses (1922) | James Joyce | Jim Norton and Marcella Riordan | Naxos Audiobooks | Finalist | |
| 2006 11th | Around the World in Eighty Days (1872) | Jules Verne | Jim Dale | Random House Audio | Winner | |
| 2006 11th | The Noël Coward Collection (1972) | Noël Coward | Simon Jones, Noël Coward, and Margaret Leighton | HarperAudio | Finalist | |
| 2006 11th | The Phantom of the Opera (1910) | Gaston Leroux | Ralph Cosham | Blackstone Audio | Finalist | |
| 2006 11th | A Tale of Two Cities (1859) | Charles Dickens | Anton Lesser | Naxos Audiobooks | Finalist | |
| 2006 11th | The Mystery of Edwin Drood (1870) | Charles Dickens | David Thorn | Alcazar AudioWorks | Finalist | |
| 2007 12th | To Kill a Mockingbird (1960) | Harper Lee | Sissy Spacek | HarperAudio/Caedmon | Winner | |
| 2007 12th | The Painted Veil (1925) | W. Somerset Maugham | Kate Reading | Blackstone Audio | Finalist | |
| 2007 12th | The Sun Also Rises (1926) | Ernest Hemingway | William Hurt | Simon & Schuster Audio | Finalist | |
| 2007 12th | The Warden (1855) | Anthony Trollope | Simon Vance | Blackstone Audio | Finalist | |
| 2007 12th | The Years (1937) | Virginia Woolf | Finty Williams | BBC Audiobooks America | Finalist | |
| 2008 13th | Treasure Island (1882) | Robert Louis Stevenson | Alfred Molina | Random House Audio/Listening Library | Winner | |
| 2008 13th | 1984 (1949) | George Orwell | Simon Prebble | Blackstone Audio | Finalist | |
| 2008 13th | The Call of the Wild (1903) | Jack London | John Lee | Blackstone Audio | Finalist | |
| 2008 13th | Catch-22 (1961) | Joseph Heller | Jay O. Sanders | Scholastic Audio | Finalist | |
| 2008 13th | A Clockwork Orange (1962) | Anthony Burgess | Tom Hollander | HarperAudio | Finalist | |
| 2008 13th | White Fang (1906) | Jack London | John Lee | Blackstone Audio | Finalist | |
| 2009 14th | Great Expectations (1861) | Charles Dickens | Simon Vance | Tantor Audio | Winner | |
| 2009 14th | Galápagos (1985) | Kurt Vonnegut | Jonathan Davis | Audible | Finalist | |
| 2009 14th | The Adventures of Tom Sawyer (1876) | Mark Twain | Grover Gardner | Blackstone Audio | Finalist | |
| 2009 14th | The Count of Monte Cristo (1845) | Alexandre Dumas | John Lee | Blackstone Audio | Finalist | |
| 2009 14th | The Picture of Dorian Gray (1891) | Oscar Wilde | Simon Vance | Blackstone Audio | Finalist | |

=== 2010s ===
| Year | Title | Author(s) | Narrator(s) | Publisher | Result | Ref. |
|---|---|---|---|---|---|---|
| 2010 15th | Great Expectations (1861) | Charles Dickens | Charlton Griffin | Audio Connoisseur | Winner | |
| 2010 15th | The Canterbury Tales (1400) | Geoffrey Chaucer | Full cast | BBC Audiobooks America | Finalist | |
| 2010 15th | A Christmas Carol (1843) | Charles Dickens | Charlton Griffin | Audio Connoisseur | Finalist | |
| 2010 15th | Tristram Shandy (1759) | Laurence Sterne | Anton Lesser | Naxos AudioBooks | Finalist | |
| 2010 15th | The Turn of the Screw (1898) | Henry James | Simon Vance and Vanessa Benjamin | Blackstone Audio | Finalist | |
| 2011 16th | The Woman in White (1859) | Wilkie Collins | Roger Ress, Rosalyn Landar, John Lee, and Judy Geeson | Blackstone Audio | Winner | |
| 2011 16th | Light in August (1932) | William Faulkner | Will Patton | Audible | Finalist | |
| 2011 16th | A Tale of Two Cities (1859) | Charles Dickens | Charlton Griffin | Audio Connoisseur | Finalist | |
| 2011 16th | Watership Down (1972) | Richard Adams | Ralph Cosham | Blackstone Audio | Finalist | |
| 2011 16th | The Book of Five Rings (1645) | Miyamoto Musashi | Scott Brick | Tantor Audio | Finalist | |
| 2012 17th | The Life and Adventures of Nicholas Nickleby (1839) | Charles Dickens | Simon Vance | Tantor Audio | Winner | |
| 2012 17th | The Adventures of Huckleberry Finn (1885) | Mark Twain | Elijah Wood | Audible | Finalist | |
| 2012 17th | Deliverance (1970) | James Dickens | Will Patton | Audible | Finalist | |
| 2012 17th | Heart of Darkness (1899) | Joseph Conrad | Kenneth Branagh | Audible | Finalist | |
| 2012 17th | I Know Why the Caged Bird Sings (1969) | Maya Angelou | Maya Angelou | Books on Tape | Finalist | |
| 2013 18th | Dombey and Son (1848) | Charles Dickens | Charlton Griffin | Audio Connoisseur | Winner | |
| 2013 18th | A Death in the Family (1948) | James Agee | Lloyd James | Blackstone Audio | Finalist | |
| 2013 18th | Dracula (1897) | Bram Stoker | Alan Cumming, Tim Curry, et al. | Audible | Finalist | |
| 2013 18th | The Mark of Zorro (2011) | Yuri Rasovsky | Val Kilmer and full cast | Blackstone Audio | Finalist | |
| 2013 18th | The Prime Minister (1876) | Anthony Trollope | Simon Vance | Blackstone Audio | Finalist | |
| 2014 19th | The Complete Sherlock Holmes: The Heirloom Collection (1887–1927) | Arthur Conan Doyle | Simon Vance | Brilliance Audio | Winner | |
| 2014 19th | Coming of Age in Mississippi (1968) | Anne Moody | Lisa Reneé Pitts | Tantor Audio | Finalist | |
| 2014 19th | Frankenstein (1818) | Mary Shelley | Dan Stevens | Audible | Finalist | |
| 2014 19th | The Great Gatsby (1925) | F. Scott Fitzgerald | Jake Gyllenhaal | Audible | Finalist | |
| 2014 19th | Love in the Time of Cholera (1985) | Gabriel García Márquez | Armando Duran | Blackstone Audio | Finalist | |
| 2015 20th | The New York Stories (1966) | John O'Hara | E. L. Doctorow, Becky Ann Baker, Dylan Baker, Bobby Cannavale, Jon Hamm, Richard Kind, Jan Maxwell, Gretchen Mol, and Dallas Roberts | Penguin Random House Audio | Winner | |
| 2015 20th | Andersonville (1955) | MacKinlay Kantor | Grover Gardner | Audible | Finalist | |
| 2015 20th | Breakfast at Tiffany's (1958) | Truman Capote | Michael C. Hall | Audible | Finalist | |
| 2015 20th | Darkwater (1920) | W. E. B. Du Bois | Bernard K. Addison, Dion Graham, Lisa Renee Pitts, Bahni Turpin, and Mirron Willis | Skyboat Media/Blackstone Audio | Finalist | |
| 2015 20th | The Odyssey (8th–7th century B.C.) | Homer (trans. Robert Fitzgerald) | Dan Stevens | Macmillan Audio | Finalist | |

== Literary fiction winners and finalists 2005–2015 ==
=== 2000s ===
| Year | Title | Author(s) | Narrator(s) | Publisher | |
|---|---|---|---|---|---|
| 2005 10th | An Unpardonable Crime (2003) | Andrew Taylor | Derek Jacobi | Hyperion Audiobooks | Winner |
| 2005 10th | The Crimson Petal and the White (2002) | Michel Faber | Jill Tanner | Recorded Books | Finalist |
| 2005 10th | The Egyptian (1945) | Mika Waltari | Charlton Griffin | Audio Connoisseur | Finalist |
| 2005 10th | Gould's Book of Fish (2001) | Richard Flanagan | Humphrey Bower | Bolinda Audio | Finalist |
| 2005 10th | Jonathan Strange & Mr Norrell (2004) | Susanna Clarke | Simon Prebble | Audio Renaissance | Finalist |
| 2005 10th | The Mark of the Angel (1998) | Nancy Huston | Richard Aspel | Bolinda Audio | Finalist |
| 2005 10th | The Master (2004) | Colm Tóibín | Geoffrey Howard | Blackstone Audio | Finalist |
| 2006 11th | Upstate (2005) | Kalisha Buckhanon | Heather Simms and Chadwick Boseman | Audio Renaissance | Winner |
| 2006 11th | Brother Fish (2004) | Bryce Courtenay | Humphrey Bower | Bolinda Audio | Finalist |
| 2006 11th | Casanova in Bolzano (1940) | Sandor Marai | Simon Prebble | HighBridge Audio | Finalist |
| 2006 11th | Cloud Atlas (2004) | David Mitchell | Scott Brick, Cassandra Campbell, Kim Mai Guest, Kirby Heyborne, John Lee, and Richard Matthews | Books on Tape | Finalist |
| 2006 11th | The Highest Tide (2005) | Jim Lynch | Fisher Stevens | Audio Renaissance | Finalist |
| 2007 12th | The Thirteenth Tale (2006) | Diane Setterfield | Ruthie Henshall and Lynn Redgrave | Simon & Schuster Audio | Winner |
| 2007 12th | Absurdistan (2006) | Gary Shteyngart | Arte Johnson | Phoenix Books | Finalist |
| 2007 12th | After This (2006) | Alice McDermott | Martha Plimpton | Audio Renaissance | Finalist |
| 2007 12th | All the King's Men (1946) | Robert Penn Warren | Michael Emerson | Recorded Books | Finalist |
| 2007 12th | Suite Française (1942) | Irène Némirovsky | Daniel Oreskes and Barbara Rosenblat | HighBridge Audio | Finalist |
| 2008 13th | Tree of Smoke (2007) | Denis Johnson | Will Patton | Macmillan Audio | Winner |
| 2008 13th | Blood Meridian (1985) | Cormac McCarthy | Richard Poe | Recorded Books | Finalist |
| 2008 13th | The Inheritance of Loss (2006) | Kiran Desai | Meera Simhan | Penguin Audio | Finalist |
| 2008 13th | Portrait of an Unknown Woman (2007) | Vanora Bennett | Josephine Bailey | Tantor Audio | Finalist |
| 2008 13th | The Yiddish Policeman's Union (2007) | Michael Chabon | Peter Riegert | HarperAudio | Finalist |
| 2009 14th | Elmer Gantry (1926) | Sinclair Lewis | Anthony Heald | Blackstone Audio | Winner |
| 2009 14th | Crime and Punishment (1866) | Fyodor Dostoevsky | Anthony Heald | Blackstone Audio | Finalist |
| 2009 14th | The Enchantress of Florence (2008) | Salman Rushdie | Firdous Bamji | Recorded Books | Finalist |
| 2009 14th | Lush Life (2008) | Richard Price | John Lee | Tantor Audio | Finalist |
| 2009 14th | The White Tiger (2008) | Aravind Adiga | John Lee | Tantor Audio | Finalist |

=== 2010s ===
| Year | Title | Author(s) | Narrator(s) | Publisher | Result | Ref. |
|---|---|---|---|---|---|---|
| 2010 15th | Wolf Hall (2009) | Hilary Mantel | Simon Slater | Macmillan Audio | Winner | |
| 2010 15th | Come Sunday (2009) | Isla Morley | Jennifer Wiltsie | Macmillan Audio | Finalist | |
| 2010 15th | The Coral Thief (2009) | Rebecca Stott | Simon Prebble | Tantor Audio | Finalist | |
| 2010 15th | The Elegance of the Hedgehog (2006) | Muriel Barbery | Barbara Rosenblat and Cassandra Morris | HighBridge Audio | Finalist | |
| 2010 15th | Good-bye and Amen (2008) | Beth Gutcheon | Joyce Bean | Tantor Audio | Finalist | |
| 2011 16th | Snakewoman of Little Egypt (2010) | Robert Hellenga | Coleen Marlo | Tantor Audio | Winner | |
| 2011 16th | Beautiful Maria of My Soul (2010) | Oscar Hijuelos | Armando Duran | Blackstone Audio | Finalist | |
| 2011 16th | Freedom (2010) | Jonathan Franzen | David LeDoux | Macmillan Audio | Finalist | |
| 2011 16th | My Life As a Man (1974) | Philip Roth | Dan John Miller | Brilliance Audio | Finalist | |
| 2011 16th | The Thousand Autumns of Jacob de Zoet (2010) | David Mitchell | Jonathan Aris and Paula Wilcox | Recorded Books | Finalist | |
| 2012 17th | State of Wonder (2011) | Ann Patchett | Hope Davis | HarperAudio | Winner | |
| 2012 17th | Emily and Einstein (2011) | Linda Francis Lee | Dan John Miller and Cassandra Campbell | Tantor Audio | Finalist | |
| 2012 17th | Follow the River (1981) | James Alexander Thom | David Drummond | Tantor Audio | Finalist | |
| 2012 17th | The Marriage Plot (2011) | Jeffrey Eugenides | David Pittu | Macmillan Audio | Finalist | |
| 2012 17th | No One in the World (2011) | E. Lynn Harris and R. M. Johnson | Alan Bomar Jones | Tantor Audio | Finalist | |
| 2013 18th | The End of the Affair (1951) | Graham Greene | Colin Firth | Audible | Winner | |
| 2013 18th | Heft (2012) | Liz Moore | Kirby Heyborne and Keith Szarabajka | Blackstone Audio | Finalist | |
| 2013 18th | The Remains of the Day(1989) | Kazuo Ishiguro | Simon Prebble | Tantor Audio | Finalist | |
| 2013 18th | Remember Ben Clayton (2011) | Stephen Harrigan | George Guidall | Recorded Books | Finalist | |
| 2014 19th | The Goldfinch (2013) | Donna Tartt | David Pittu | Hachette Audio | Winner | |
| 2014 19th | Amy Falls Down (2013) | Jincy Willett | Amy McFadden | Brilliance Audio | Finalist | |
| 2014 19th | The Curiosity (2013) | Stephen Kiernan | Kate Udall, Erik Bergmann, and George Guidall | HarperAudio | Finalist | |
| 2014 19th | The Son (2013) | Philipp Meyer | Will Patton, Kate Mulgrew, Scott Shepherd, and Clifton Collins, Jr. | HarperAudio | Finalist | |
| 2014 19th | The Testament of Mary (2012) | Colm Tóibín | Meryl Streep | Simon & Schuster Audio | Finalist | |
| 2015 20th | Euphoria (2014) | Lily King | Simon Vance and Xe Sands | Blackstone Audio | Winner | |
| 2015 20th | The Bone Clocks (2014) | David Mitchell | Jessica Ball, Leon Williams, Colin Mace, Steven Crossley, Laurel Lefkow, and Anna Bentinck | Recorded Books | Finalist | |
| 2015 20th | Nora Webster (2014) | Colm Tóibín | Fiona Shaw | Simon & Schuster Audio | Finalist | |
| 2015 20th | The Patrick Melrose Novels (2014) | Edward St Aubyn | Alex Jennings | Macmillan Audio | Finalist | |
| 2015 20th | An Unnecessary Woman(2014) | Rabih Alameddine | Suzanne Toren | Audible | Finalist | |
| 2015 20th | Your Fathers, Where Are They? And the Prophets, Do They Live Forever? (2014) | Dave Eggers | MacLeod Andrews, March Cashman, Mark Deakins, Michelle Gonzalez, Rebecca Lowman, John H. Mayer, Kate McGregor-Stewart, and Bruce Turk | Penguin Random House Audio | Finalist | |
