= Audie Award for Best Male Narrator =

- Awarded for: Excellence in audiobook narration by a man
- Sponsored by: Audio Publishers Association (APA)
- Date: Annually
- First award: 1998

The Audie Award for Best Male Narrator is one of the Audie Awards presented annually by the Audio Publishers Association (APA). It awards excellence in audiobook narration by a man released in a given year. Before 2016 the award was given as the Audie Award for Male Solo Narration. It has been awarded since 1998, when it superseded the Audie Award for Solo Narration. The award was disestablished in 2024, at which point it was replaced by the Audie Awards for Best Fiction and Non-Fiction Narrator.

== Winners and finalists ==
=== 1990s ===
Year	Title	Author	Narrator(s)	Publisher	Result	Ref.
1998 3rd	American Pastoral (1997)	Philip Roth	Ron Silver	Dove Audio	Winner	
1998 3rd	Always Outnumbered, Always Outgunned (1997)	Walter Mosley	Paul Winfield	Dove Audio	Finalist	
1998 3rd	The Classic Pooh Treasury: Volume 3 (1926–1928)	A. A. Milne	Peter Dennis	K-tel International USA	Finalist	
1999 4th	City of Darkness (1976)	Ben Bova	Harlan Ellison	Dove Audio	Winner	
1999 4th	Cloudsplitter (1998)	Russell Banks	George DelHoyo	Audio Literature	Finalist	
1999 4th	The Men of Brewster Place (1999)	Gloria Naylor	Joe Morton	Simon & Schuster Audio	Finalist	

=== 2000s ===
Year	Title	Author	Narrator(s)	Publisher	Result	Ref.
2000 5th	The Fencing Master (1988)	Arturo Perez-Reverte	Michael York	NewStar Media, Inc.	Winner	
2000 5th	The Adventures of Huckleberry Finn (1884)	Mark Twain	Patrick Fraley	The Audio Partners Publishing Corp.	Finalist	
2001 6th	Harry Potter and the Goblet of Fire (2000)	J. K. Rowling	Jim Dale	Random House Audio	Winner	
2001 6th	Boone's Lick (2000)	Larry McMurtry	Will Patton	Simon & Schuster Audio	Finalist	
2001 6th	Code to Zero (2000)	Ken Follett	George Guidall	Recorded Books	Finalist	
2002 7th	Coldheart Canyon (2001)	Clive Barker	Frank Muller	HarperAudio	Winner	
2002 7th	The Bad Beginning (1999)	Lemony Snicket	Tim Curry	Listening Library	Finalist	
2002 7th	The Magician of Lublin (1960)	Isaac Bashevis Singer	Larry Keith	Jewish Contemporary Classics	Finalist	
2003 8th	Tishomingo Blues (2002)	Elmore Leonard	Frank Muller	Recorded Books	Winner	
2003 8th	The Beach House (2002)	James Patterson and Peter de Jonge	Gil Bellows	Time Warner AudioBooks	Finalist	
2003 8th	Mortal Prey (2002)	John Sandford	Richard Ferrone	Putnam Berkley Audio	Finalist	
2003 8th	Pale Horse Coming (2001)	Stephen Hunter	William Dufris	BBC Audiobooks America	Finalist	
2003 8th	Street Boys (2002)	Lorenzo Carcaterra	Joe Mantegna	Random House Audio	Finalist	
2004 9th	Last Car to Elysian Fields (2003)	James Lee Burke	Will Patton	Simon & Schuster Audio	Winner	
2004 9th	Don Quixote (1615)	Miguel de Cervantes (trans. Edith Grossman)	George Guidall	Recorded Books	Finalist	
2004 9th	Fear Itself (2003)	Walter Mosley	Don Cheadle	Time Warner AudioBooks	Finalist	
2004 9th	Harry Potter and the Order of the Phoenix (2003)	J. K. Rowling	Jim Dale	Listening Library	Finalist	
2004 9th	Oryx and Crake (2003)	Margaret Atwood	Campbell Scott	Random House Audio	Finalist	
2005 10th	Peter and the Starcatchers (2004)	Dave Barry and Ridley Pearson	Jim Dale	Brilliance Audio	Winner	
2005 10th	The Breathtaker (2003)	Alice Blanchard	Peter Coyote	Time Warner AudioBooks	Finalist	
2005 10th	The Enemy (2004)	Lee Child	Dick Hill	Brilliance Audio	Finalist	
2005 10th	I Am Charlotte Simmons (2004)	Tom Wolfe	Dylan Baker	Audio Renaissance	Finalist	
2005 10th	Shoot the Moon (2004)	Billie Letts	Lou Diamond Phillips	Time Warner AudioBooks	Finalist	
2006 11th	Moby-Dick (1851)	Herman Melville	William Hootkins	Naxos AudioBooks, Ltd	Winner	
2006 11th	Assassin (2004)	Ted Bell	John Shea	Brilliance Audio	Finalist	
2006 11th	One Shot (2005)	Lee Child	Dick Hill	Brilliance Audio	Finalist	
2006 11th	Shibumi (1979)	Trevanian	Joe Barrett	Blackstone Audio	Finalist	
2006 11th	The Shining (1977)	Stephen King	Campbell Scott	Simon & Schuster Audio	Finalist	
2007 12th	Peter and the Shadow Thieves (2006)	Dave Barry and Ridley Pearson	Jim Dale	Brilliance Audio	Winner	
2007 12th	Shantaram (2003)	Gregory David Roberts	Humphrey Bower	Blackstone Audio	Finalist	
2007 12th	The Dead Yard (2006)	Adrian McKinty	Gerard Doyle	Blackstone Audio	Finalist	
2007 12th	The Old Man and the Sea (1952)	Ernest Hemingway	Donald Sutherland	Simon & Schuster Audio	Finalist	
2007 12th	War and Peace Vol. 1 (1869)	Leo Tolstoy	Neville Jason	Naxos AudioBooks Ltd.	Finalist	
2008 13th	Harry Potter and the Deathly Hallows (2007)	J. K. Rowling	Jim Dale	Random House Audio/Listening Library	Winner	
2008 13th	Catch-22 (1961)	Joseph Heller	Jay O. Sanders	HarperAudio/Caedmon	Finalist	
2008 13th	The Coldest Winter: America and the Korean War (2007)	David Halberstam	Edward Herrmann	Hyperion Audiobooks	Finalist	
2008 13th	The Long Walk (1956)	Sławomir Rawicz	John Rafter Lee	Blackstone Audio	Finalist	
2009 14th	The Count of Monte Cristo (1844)	Alexandre Dumas	John Rafter Lee	Blackstone Audio	Winner	
2009 14th	Lush Life (2008)	Richard Price	Bobby Cannavale	Macmillan Audio	Finalist	
2009 14th	The Art of Racing in the Rain (2008)	Garth Stein	Christopher Evan Welch	HarperAudio	Finalist	
2009 14th	The Silver Swan (2008)	Benjamin Black	Timothy Dalton	Macmillan Audio	Finalist	
2009 14th	The Story of Edgar Sawtelle (2008)	David Wroblewski	Richard Poe	Recorded Books	Finalist	
2009 14th	The White Tiger (2008)	Aravind Adiga	John Rafter Lee	Tantor Audio	Finalist	

=== 2010s ===
Year	Title	Author	Narrator(s)	Publisher	Result	Ref.
2010 15th	Great Expectations (1860–1861)	Charles Dickens	Charlton Griffin	Audio Connoisseur	Winner	
2010 15th	A Christmas Carol (1843)	Charles Dickens	Charlton Griffin	Audio Connoisseur	Finalist	
2010 15th	The Birthing House (2008)	Christopher Ransom	Edward Herrmann	Blackstone Audio	Finalist	
2010 15th	Jesus' Son (1992)	Denis Johnson	Will Patton	Macmillan Audio	Finalist	
2010 15th	Beat the Reaper (2009)	Josh Bazell	Robert Petkoff	Hachette Audio	Finalist	
2011 16th	Zorgamazoo (2008)	Robert Paul Weston	Alan Cumming	Penguin Audio	Winner	
2011 16th	The Complete Stories of Sherlock Holmes: Volume II (1887–1927)	Arthur Conan Doyle	Charlton Griffin	Audio Connoisseur	Finalist	
2011 16th	The Boy with the Cuckoo-Clock Heart (2007)	Mathias Malzieu	Jim Dale	Blackstone Audio	Finalist	
2011 16th	Innocent (2010)	Scott Turow	Edward Herrmann	Hachette Audio	Finalist	
2011 16th	Every Man Dies Alone (1947)	Hans Fallada	George Guidall	Recorded Books	Finalist	
2012 17th	The King's Speech: How One Man Saved the British Monarchy (2010)	Mark Logue and Peter Conradi	Simon Vance	Tantor Audio	Winner	
2012 17th	The Complete Stories of Sherlock Holmes: Volume III (1887–1927)	Arthur Conan Doyle	Charlton Griffin	Audio Connoisseur	Finalist	
2012 17th	Going to Meet the Man (1965)	James Baldwin	Dion Graham	AudioGO	Finalist	
2012 17th	Hard Magic (2011)	Larry Correia	Bronson Pinchot	Audible	Finalist	
2012 17th	Heart of Darkness (1899)	Joseph Conrad	Kenneth Branagh	Audible	Finalist	
2013 18th	Beautiful Ruins (2012)	Jess Walter	Edoardo Ballerini	HarperAudio	Winner	
2013 18th	The Absolutist (2011)	John Boyne	Michael Maloney	Tantor Audio	Finalist	
2013 18th	Being There (1970)	Jerzy Kosinski	Dustin Hoffman	Audible	Finalist	
2013 18th	The End of the Affair (1951)	Graham Greene	Colin Firth	Audible	Finalist	
2013 18th	The Tao of Pooh (1982)	Benjamin Hoff	Simon Vance	Tantor Audio	Finalist	
2014 19th	The Goldfinch (2013)	Donna Tartt	David Pittu	Hachette Audio	Winner	
2014 19th	Dimension of Miracles (1968)	Robert Sheckley	John Hodgman	Audible	Finalist	
2014 19th	Doctor Sleep (2013)	Stephen King	Will Patton	Simon & Schuster Audio	Finalist	
2014 19th	Frankenstein (1818)	Mary Shelley	Dan Stevens	Audible	Finalist	
2014 19th	In a Glass Grimmly (2012)	Adam Gidwitz	Johnny Heller	Recorded Books	Finalist	
2014 19th	Warbound (2013)	Larry Correia	Bronson Pinchot	Audible	Finalist	
2015 20th	The Hero's Guide to Being an Outlaw (2012)	Christopher Healy	Bronson Pinchot	HarperAudio	Winner	
2015 20th	Hamlet, Prince of Denmark (2014)	A. J. Hartley and David Hewson	Richard Armitage	Audible	Finalist	
2015 20th	The Martian (2011)	Andy Weir	R. C. Bray	Podium Publishing	Finalist	
2015 20th	Mr. Mercedes (2014)	Stephen King	Will Patton	Simon & Schuster Audio	Finalist	
2015 20th	The Other Story (2013)	Tatiana de Rosnay	Simon Vance	Macmillan Audio	Finalist	
2015 20th	Radiance of Tomorrow (2014)	Ishmael Beah	Dion Graham	Macmillan Audio	Finalist	
2016 21st	Gabriel Allon: The English Spy (2015)	Daniel Silva	George Guidall	HarperAudio	Winner	
2016 21st	Breakfast of Champions (1973)	Kurt Vonnegut	John Malkovich	Audible	Finalist	
2016 21st	Classic Love Poems (2015)	Various	Richard Armitage	Audible	Finalist	
2016 21st	Dead Wake: The Last Crossing of the Lusitania (2015)	Erik Larson	Scott Brick	Books on Tape/Penguin Random House Audio	Finalist	
2016 21st	Finders Keepers (2015)	Stephen King	Will Patton	Simon & Schuster Audio	Finalist	
2016 21st	Jurassic Park (1990)	Michael Crichton	Scott Brick	Brilliance Audio	Finalist	
2017 22nd	Jerusalem (2016)	Alan Moore	Simon Vance	Recorded Books	Winner	
2017 22nd	Bob Honey Who Just Do Stuff (2016)	Sean Penn	Sean Penn	Audible	Finalist	
2017 22nd	End of Watch (2016)	Stephen King	Will Patton	Simon & Schuster Audio	Finalist	
2017 22nd	The Last Tribe (2015)	Brad Manuel	Scott Brick	Podium Publishing	Finalist	
2017 22nd	The Purloined Poodle (2016)	Kevin Hearne	Luke Daniels	Kevin Hearne/ACX	Finalist	
2017 22nd	Underground Airlines (2016)	Ben H. Winters	William DeMeritt	Hachette Audio	Finalist	
2018 23rd	Born a Crime: Stories from a South African Childhood (2016)	Trevor Noah	Trevor Noah	Audible	Winner	
2018 23rd	The Gentleman's Guide to Vice and Virtue (2017)	Mackenzi Lee	Christian Coulson	HarperAudio	Finalist	
2018 23rd	Glass Houses (2017)	Louise Penny	Robert Bathurst	Macmillan Audio	Finalist	
2018 23rd	Murder on the Orient Express (1934)	Agatha Christie	Kenneth Branagh	HarperAudio	Finalist	
2018 23rd	Sherlock Holmes (1887–1927)	Arthur Conan Doyle (with Stephen Fry)	Stephen Fry	Audible	Finalist	
2019 24th	Watchers (1987)	Dean Koontz	Edoardo Ballerini	Brilliance Audio	Winner	
2019 24th	The Devil's Half Mile (2018)	Paddy Hirsch	Euan Morton	Macmillan Audio	Finalist	
2019 24th	Harry Clarke (2017)	David Cale	Billy Crudup	Audible	Finalist	
2019 24th	Pet Sematary (1983)	Stephen King	Michael C. Hall	Simon & Schuster Audio	Finalist	
2019 24th	Threadbare: Stuff and Nonsense (2017)	Andrew Seiple	Tim Gerard Reynolds	Podium Publishing	Finalist	

=== 2020s ===
Year	Title	Author	Narrator(s)	Publisher	Result	Ref.
2020 25th	Kingdom of the Blind (2018)	Louise Penny	Robert Bathurst	Macmillan Audio	Winner	
2020 25th	The Dutch House (2019)	Ann Patchett	Tom Hanks	HarperAudio	Finalist	
2020 25th	Everything Is Illuminated (2002)	Jonathan Safran Foer	Robert Petkoff	Houghton Mifflin Harcourt	Finalist	
2020 25th	The Nickel Boys (2019)	Colson Whitehead	JD Jackson	Penguin Random House Audio	Finalist	
2020 25th	Watership Down (1972)	Richard Adams	Peter Capaldi	Blackstone Audio	Finalist	
2021 26th	The Autobiography of Malcolm X: As Told to Alex Haley (1965)	Malcolm X and Alex Haley	Laurence Fishburne	Audible	Winner	
2021 26th	All the Devils Are Here (2020)	Louise Penny	Robert Bathurst	Macmillan Audio	Finalist	
2021 26th	The Glimme	Emily Rodda and Marc McBride	Andrew Scott	Bolinda Audio	Finalist	
2021 26th	A Man Called Ove (2012)	Fredrik Backman with Henning Koch (trans.)	J. K. Simmons	Simon & Schuster Audio	Finalist	
2021 26th	Squeeze Me (2020)	Carl Hiaasen	Scott Brick	Penguin Random House Audio	Finalist	
2022 27th	Aristotle and Dante Dive into the Waters of the World (2021)	Benjamin Alire Sáenz	Lin-Manuel Miranda	Simon & Schuster Audio	Winner	
2022 27th	The Didomenico Fragment	Amor Towles	John Lithgow	Audible Originals	Finalist	
2022 27th	Legends of the North Cascades	Jonathan Evison	Edoardo Ballerini	Workman Audio	Finalist	
2022 27th	The Madness of Crowds	Louise Penny	Robert Bathurst	Macmillan Audio	Finalist	
2022 27th	The Sweetness of Water (2021)	Nathan Harris	William DeMeritt	Hachette Audio	Finalist	
2023 28th	Fairy Tale (2022)	Stephen King	Seth Numrich	Simon & Schuster Audio	Winner	
2023 28th	The Silent Sisters	Robert Dugoni	Edoardo Ballerini	Brilliance Publishing	Finalist	
2023 28th	Narrator	Landon Beach	Scott Brick	Brick By Brick Audiobooks	Finalist	
2023 28th	The Violin Conspiracy	William DeMeritt	JD Jackson	Penguin Random House Audio	Finalist	
2023 28th	Sleepwalk	Dan Chaon	John Pirhalla	Macmillan Audio	Finalist	
