= Cassandra Campbell =

American audiobook narrator

- Notable works: The Help (2009); The Immortal Life of Henrietta Lacks (2010); Small Great Things (2016)
- Notable awards: Audie Award for Fiction (2010); Audie Award for Nonfiction (2011); Audie Award for Multi-Voiced Performance (2017)

Cassandra Campbell is an American narrator of over 900 audiobooks. She has won four Audie Awards from the Audio Publishers Association and has been a finalist for several more. She has also earned numerous Earphones Awards from AudioFile, who named her a Golden Voice Narrator. In 2018, she was inducted into Audible’s Narrator Hall of Fame.

Literary Hub called her "an oral shapeshifter," saying, "her versatility, her emotional intelligence, and her resonant voice make her a much sought-after narrator."

== Biography ==
Campbell's "mother was a drama teacher and her father was a theater critic."

Prior to narrating audiobooks, Campbell taught in the theater department at the Los Angeles County High School for the Arts.

== Awards and honors ==
In 2018, Campbell was inducted into Audible’s Narrator Hall of Fame, and in June 2021, AudioFile named her a Golden Voice narrator, their "lifetime achievement honor for audiobook narrators."

=== Awards ===
Awards for Campbell's work
Year	Audiobook	Award	Result	Ref.
2006	Cloud Atlas by David Mitchell	Audie Award for Literary Fiction or Classics	Finalist	
2009	The Help by Kathryn Stockett	Listen-Up Award for Fiction	Finalist	
2010	Double Minds by Terri Blackstock	Audie Award for Faith-Based Fiction and Nonfiction	Finalist	
2010	The Help by Kathryn Stockett	Audie Award for Fiction	Winner	
2010	The Help by Kathryn Stockett	Audie Award for Distinguished Achievement in Production	Winner	
2011	Abigail Adams by Woody Holton	Audie Award for Biography or Memoir	Finalist	
2011	Dreamdark Silksinger by Lani Taylor	Amazing Audiobooks for Young Adults	Top 10	
2011	The Immortal Life of Henrietta Lacks by Rebecca Skloot	Audie Award for Nonfiction	Winner	
2012	Emily and Einstein by Linda Francis Lee	Audie Award for Literary Fiction or Classics	Finalist	
2012	You Know When the Men Are Gone by Siobhan Fallon	Audie Award for Short Stories or Collections	Finalist	
2013	Juliet in August by Dianne Warren	Audie Award for Best Female Narrator	Finalist	
2013	Welcome To Bordertown, edited by Holly Black and Ellen Kushner	Audie Award for Short Stories or Collections	Finalist	
2013	The Woman Upstairs by Claire Messud	Listen-Up Award for Audiobook of the Year	Finalist	
2013	The Woman Upstairs by Claire Messud	Listen-Up Award for Audiobook Narrator of the Year	Finalist	
2013	The Woman Upstairs by Claire Messud	Listen-Up Award for Fiction	Finalist	
2014	He’s Gone by Deb Caletti	Audie Award for Mystery	Finalist	
2015	Life Drawing by Robin Black	Audie Award for Solo Narration--Female	Finalist	
2016	The Lost Landscape by Joyce Carol Oates	Audie Award for Solo Narration--Female	Finalist	
2017	America’s First Daughter by Stephanie Dray and Laura Kamoie	Audie Award for Fiction	Finalist	
2017	Small Great Things by Jodi Picoult	Audie Award for Multi-Voiced Performance	Winner	
2017	When Breath Becomes Air by Paul Kalanithi	Audie Award for Autobiography or Memoir	Finalist	
2019	And the Ocean Was Our Sky by Patrick Ness	Amazing Audiobooks for Young Adults	Selection	
2020	Charlotte’s Web by E. B. White	Audie Award for Audiobook of the Year	Finalist	
2020	Charlotte’s Web by E. B. White	Audie Award for Middle Grade Title	Winner	
2020	Nevertheless We Persisted: Me Too by Em Jae et al.	Audie Award for Original Work	Finalist	
2022	The Charm Offensive by Alison Cochrun	Audie Award for Romance	Finalist	

=== "Best of" lists ===
Campbell's narrations have frequently landed on lists naming the best audiobooks of the year.

In 2017, Booklist included Campbell's narrations of George Saunders's Lincoln in the Bardo and Jessica Shattuck's The Women in the Castle on their "Audio Stars for Adults" list. The following year, they included Lincoln in the Bardo on their Listen List for Outstanding Audio Narration.

In 2019, Booklist included Campbell's narration of Delia Owens's Where the Crawdads Sing on their "Audio Stars for Adults" list.

Best audiobooks of the year
Year	Audiobook	Organization	Category	Ref.
2009	Half Sky: Turning Oppression into Opportunity for Women Worldwide by Nicholas D. Kristof and Sheryl WuDunn	AudioFile	Contemporary Culture	
2009	The Help by Kathryn Stockett	AudioFile	Fiction & Classics	
2009	Lucky Breaks by Susan Patron	AudioFile	Children	
2009	The School of Essential Ingredients by Erica Bauermeister	AudioFile	Fiction	
2010	Brava, Valentine by Adriana Trigiani	AudioFile	Fiction	
2010	Juliet by Anne Fortier	AudioFile	Fiction	
2011	The Program by Kelly Traver and Betty Kelly Sargent	AudioFile	Personal Growth	
2012	Juliet in August by Dianne Warren	AudioFile	Fiction	
2012	Lucky for Good by Susan Patron	ALSC	Children's	
2012	Moon Over Manifest by Clare Vanderpool	ALSC	Children's	
2014	Life Drawing by Robin Black	AudioFile	Fiction	
2014	The Strange and Beautiful Sorrows of Ava Lavender by Leslye Walton	AudioFile	Young Adult	
2014	Vatican Waltz by Roland Merullo	AudioFile	Fiction	
2015	The Lost Landscape by Joyce Carol Oates	AudioFile	Biography & Memoir	
2016	When Breath Becomes Air by Paul Kalanithi	AudioFile	Memoir	
2017	The Bright Hour by Nina Riggs	AudioFile	Memoir	
2017	The Jersey Brothers by Sally Mott Freeman	AudioFile	Biography & History	
2017	Lincoln in the Bardo by George Saunders	Booklist	Adult	
2017	Lincoln in the Bardo by George Saunders	Booklist	Historical Fiction	
2017	The Most Dangerous Place on Earth by Lindsey Lee Johnson	Publishers Weekly	Fiction	
2017	The Women in the Castle by Jessica Shattuck	Booklist	Adult	
2018	The Women in the Castle by Jessica Shattuck	Booklist	Women's Fiction	
2019	Where the Crawdads Sing by Delia Owens	Booklist	First Novels	
2019	Where the Crawdads Sing by Delia Owens	Booklist	Women's Fiction	
2019	The Women in the Castle by Jessica Shattuck	Booklist	Historical Fiction	
2020	Where the Crawdads Sing by Delia Owens	Booklist	Book-Group Audiobooks	
