= Siobhan Fallon =

Siobhan Fallon may refer to:

- Siobhan Fallon Hogan (born 1961), American actress
- Siobhan Fallon (writer), American writer active 2011–present
