= Bolinda Publishing =

Australian publishing house

Bolinda Publishing, based in Melbourne, Australia, is a publisher of audiobooks in collaboration with book publishers, including ABC, HarperCollins, Penguin, and Pushkin Press.

== History ==
Founded in 1986 Tullamarine, Victoria, Bolinda began as Australian Large Print Audio and Video Pty Ltd, supplying public libraries with large print format (Bolinda Press) of popular books and spoken word on compact cassettes (Bolinda Audio). They since opened offices in England, America and New Zealand.

Readers have included Dylan Alcott reading his memoir Able: Gold Medals, Grand Slams and Smashing Glass Ceilings, Peter Combe reading classic fairy stories for children, Ruby Rees reading Erich Kästner's 1949 German children's novel The Parent Trap, and Tim Winton, for his own stories.

== Recognition ==
In 2011 Bolinda was shortlisted for the Australian Book Industry Awards in the category "Small Publisher of the Year"

Awards

- AudioFile magazine's Earphones Award for Jim Daly's narration of Morris West's "The Lovers"
- Audie Award for Audiobook of the Year in 2016 for The Water Diviner, read by Jack Thompson.

Audie Awards are bestowed by the Audio Publishers Association in a great number of categories. Others in which Bolinda have been successful are: Autobiography or Memoir, Best Male Narrator, Business and Personal Development, Faith-Based Fiction and Nonfiction, Fiction, Literary Fiction or Classics, Middle Grade Title, Mystery, Narration by the Author, Original Work, Short Stories or Collections, Thriller or Suspense, Young Adult Title, Young Listeners' Title.
