= The Financial Lives of the Poets =

2009 book by Jess Walter

- Author: Jess Walter
- Language: English
- Publication date: 2009

The Financial Lives of the Poets is the fifth novel by the American writer Jess Walter. It is a comedic novel first published in 2009. The novel explores the 2008 financial crisis, through the eyes of a business reporter turned poet.

== Reception ==
Reception of the novel was generally positive. The New York Times was largely positive, calling it successful at "captur[ing] the fiscal panic and frustration" and full of "blistering wisecracks". The Los Angeles Times called it "darkly funny, surprisingly tender [and] verse sprinkled", though the review highlighted the characters in the novel as flawed and "bumbling", bringing their woes upon themselves.

The Washington Post was similarly positive, though focusing on how the humor and comedy critique the American economic system, as "a scathing indictment of our country's character and the "ruined systems" we labor under." The Daily Telegraph review was more mixed, describing it as a "zeitgeist novel", humorously reflecting on the economic depression, yet at the same time flawed. "For every moment of acute description [...] there are paragraphs of slumping, banal analysis."
