= The Highest Tide =

Book by Jim Lynch

- Author: Jim Lynch
- Language: English
- Publication date: 2005

The Highest Tide is a 2005 young adult novel by author Jim Lynch.

== Plot ==
Miles O'Malley is a 13-year-old boy from Skookumchuck Bay, a fictional place in western Washington, near Olympia. Miles is in love with his 18-year-old babysitter, Angie Stegner, daughter of the local judge and his neighbor. His parents are unhappy and want a divorce, which has consequences for Miles. The only person who believes in Miles is the local professor, who cares a lot for him and is intrigued by his knowledge of Puget Sound. Miles also enjoys visiting his neighbor Florence, an old woman with advanced Parkinson's disease who was once a professional psychic. Although she informs Miles of a very high tide coming in that September, all of her previous 'readings' were wrong, so he doubts her prediction. After Miles discovers a very rare sea animal, a giant squid, washed up on the shore, he is struck by fame, which he has trouble handling. Every headline in the local newspapers includes his name, people want to meet him, and he is overwhelmed by the whole situation, as he was just doing what he loved. His parents, who never thought much of their son or the ocean, are embarrassed by all the publicity, and feel like they do not really know Miles. A series of strange events tie the story together and odd things are happening in the Puget Sound. This is a summer that will change Miles forever.
