= Charlton Griffin =

Voiceover actor and audiobook narrator

Charlton Griffin is a voiceover actor and audiobook narrator, as well as owner of Audio Connoisseur, an audiobook publishing company. He primarily records audiobooks of literary classics and is considered "the voice of Sherlock Holmes." He has won four Earphone Awards and five Audie Awards.

== Awards ==
Year	Title	Author	Award	Result	Ref.
2001	Complete Short Stories of William Somerset Maugham, Vol. 1 (1899–1952)	William Somerset Maugham	Audie Award for Literary Fiction or Classics	Winner	
2001	The Short Stories of William Somerset Maugham	William Somerset Maugham	Earphones Award	Winner	
2001	The Short Stories of Anton Pavlovich Chekhov (1892)	Anton Pavlovich Chekhov	Earphones Award	Winner	
2003	Complete Short Stories of William Somerset Maugham, Vol. II (1899–1952)	William Somerset Maugham	Audie Award for Literary Fiction or Classics	Winner	
2003	Classic Chinese Short Stories, Vol. 1	Feng Menglong, Lin Yu Tang, P'u Sung-ling, et al.	Audie Award for Short Stories or Collections	Finalist	
2004	Classic Chinese Short Stories, Volume 2	Yuan Zhen, Lien Pu, Hsieh Liang, Mao Tun, Feng Meng-lung	Audie Award for Short Stories or Collections	Finalist	
2004	Hannibal (1958)	Harold Lamb	Audie Award for Autobiography or Memoir	Finalist	
2005	The Twelve Caesars (121)	Suetonius	Audie Award for Autobiography or Memoir	Finalist	
2005	The Egyptian (1945)	Mika Waltari	Audie Award for Classics	Finalist	
2005	The Egyptian (1945)	Mika Waltari	Audie Award for Literary Fiction	Finalist	
2005	Complete Short Stories of William Somerset Maugham, Vol. III	William Somerset Maugham	Audie Award for Short Stories or Collections	Finalist	
2009	A Christmas Carol (1834)	Charles Dickens	Earphones Award	Winner	
2010	A Christmas Carol (1834)	Charles Dickens	Audie Award for Best Male Narrator	Finalist	
2010	A Christmas Carol (1834)	Charles Dickens	Audie Award for Classics	Finalist	
2010	The Complete Stories of Sherlock Holmes: Volume I (1812)	Arthur Conan Doyle	Audie Award for Mystery	Finalist	
2010	The Complete Stories of Sherlock Holmes: Volume I (1812)	Arthur Conan Doyle	Audie Award for Short Stories or Collections	Finalist	
2010	Great Expectations (1861)	Charles Dickens	Audie Award for Best Male Narrator	Winner	
2010	Great Expectations (1861)	Charles Dickens	Audie Award for Classics	Winner	
2011	The Complete Stories of Sherlock Holmes: Volume II	Arthur Conan Doyle	Audie Award for Best Male Narrator	Finalist	
2011	The History of Rome, Vol. 1	Livy	Audie Award for History or Biography	Finalist	
2011	A Tale of Two Cities (1859)	Charles Dickens	Audie Award for Classics	Finalist	
2012	The Complete Stories of Sherlock Holmes: Volume III (1812)	Arthur Conan Doyle	Earphones Award	Winner	
2012	The Complete Stories of Sherlock Holmes: Volume III (1812)	Arthur Conan Doyle	Audie Award for Best Male Narrator	Finalist	
2013	Dombey and Son (1848)	Charles Dickens	Audie Award for Classics	Winner	
