= Flo Gibson =

American actress

Florence A. "Flo" Gibson (February 7, 1924 – January 7, 2011) was an American narrator of audiobooks. She has also been in many radio dramas as well as appearing on stage. She graduated from New York's Neighborhood Playhouse. She died of cancer in 2011.

Flo Gibson was a familiar voice to listening audiences during the golden years of radio, an actress in the E.T.O. during World War II, and she performed in Equity Library Theater in New York. After retiring to raise a family, she returned to her career 20 years ago. She recently celebrated recording her 1,000th book for the Library of Congress and seven commercial companies. Her narration has won national acclaim, four times on the American Library Association’s "Notable Recordings for Children" lists and three times as the recipient of the Parents’ Choice Award. She was also named "Best Female Narrator" in the Audio Awards article in Book World.

She said she loved the classics. Some of her favorite authors to record were Jane Austen, Henry James and Charles Dickens. Other notable books she has read are: Jane Eyre, Little Women, The Secret Garden, and The Wizard of Oz; more recently she has recorded Anna Karenina and The War of the Worlds and over one thousand others.

Gibson started her own recorded books company, Audio Book Contractors, Inc. in 1983 at a time when there were very few audiobook companies, and the few that existed were not including unabridged classic audiobooks in their catalogues. Realizing the importance of preserving such works for the listening public, she created her own company to preserve unabridged classic books for the listening audience. She then employed local talent from the Washington theatre community to help her in the recording, monitoring, packaging and distribution of all varieties of classic books on cassettes. Some of these early employees, such as Grover Gardner, Mary Woods and John MacDonald, have gone on to continue their careers with great success in the recorded book industry and related fields.

In 2009 she recorded her 1,130th book.
