= So Far Gone (novel) =

2025 novel by Jess Walter

- First edition hardcover
- Author: Jess Walter
- Language: English
- Genre: Literary fiction
- Publisher: HarperCollins
- Publication date: June 10, 2025
- Publication place: United States
- Pages: 272
- ISBN: 9780062868145

So Far Gone is a novel by American author Jess Walter. It was published by HarperCollins on June 10, 2025. It centers a man who, after disappearing off the grid for several years, must return to society to rescue his grandchildren who have been kidnapped by his son-in-law's right-wing religious cult. It received positive reviews upon release. A Netflix series adaptation was announced in December 2025.

== Background ==
The novel was inspired by Walter's hometown of Spokane. He wrote the novel to reflect on the polarization of the United States since 2016. He described wanting to turn away from the news, and decided to create a character who took this sentiment to its extreme.

== Synopsis ==
Rhys Kinnick, a retired environmental journalist, disappears into rural Washington after punching his Christian nationalist son-in-law, Shane, during an argument over Shane's conspiracy theories at 2016 Thanksgiving dinner. In the spring of 2024, Rhys' grandchildren, thirteen-year-old Leah and nine-year-old Asher, show up at Rhys' isolated cabin after their mother Bethany runs away. Shane sends two members of the Army of the Lord, a right-wing militia affiliated with the Church of the Blessed Fire, to kidnap the children and take them to Rampart, the church's armed compound in northern Idaho. Without a car, computer, or phone, Rhys sets out to rescue his grandchildren with the help of a cast of characters including Lucy Park, Rhys' newsroom editor ex-girlfriend, and Chuck, a retired police detective turned private investigator with bipolar disorder.

== Reception ==
The novel was shortlisted for an Aspen Words Literary Prize.

Kirkus Reviews wrote that "the characters are created with loving care, the plot with reckless glee", but wrote that the events of the ending did not feel "absolutely necessary". Publishers Weekly called the plot "propulsive" and the novel's look at the two retirees need for purpose "honest and even touching". Hamilton Cain wrote in his review for The New York Times that the novel lacks the layers of Walter's previous works and that its plot "leans hard on unlikely coincidences", but praised its themes and its set pieces. Greg Zimmerman of the Chicago Review of Books praised its "punchy, hilarious dialogue, long passages of touching interiority, and astute commentary on the absurdity of our current political moment." In her review for the Washington Independent Review of Books, Tara Campbell praised its "rich descriptions" of the Pacific Northwest's landscape and Walter's ability to capture "the splendor and horror, love and rage, and failure and redemption" of the United States. The Minnesota Star Tribune praised the novel's ability to capture "the contradictions and complexities of contemporary American life". The Wall Street Journal called it a "sharp, comic outing".

== Audiobook ==
An audiobook narrated by Edoardo Ballerini was released concurrently with the hardback, ebook, and large print paperback editions. Washington Post reviewer Katherine A. Powers praised Ballerini's "inspired conjuring of the characters." It was nominated for an Audie Award for Literary Fiction & Classics.

== Series adaptation ==
A series adaptation for Netflix was announced on December 18, 2025, with Mark Bomback serving as showrunner, writer, and executive producer and Tomorrow Studios and Story Syndicate producing. Jess Walter will serve as an executive producer.
