= DC High Volume: Batman =

American superhero podcast series

- Genre: Superhero
- Language: English

Creative team
- Written by: Fred Greenhalgh; Roshan Singh Sambhi; Scott Lee Chua
- Directed by: Fred Greenhalgh; Roshan Singh Sambhi

Cast and voices
- Starring: Jason Spisak; Jay Paulson; Reba Buhr; Mike Starr; Stephanie Koenig; Chester Rushing; Shelby Young; Kevin Smith; Michelle Lukes; Jesse Burch; Troy Baker; Dan Gill; Will Friedle; Simon Vance

Music
- Composed by: Sam Ewing; Perrine Virgile

Production
- Production: Realm Media; DC Entertainment; Andas Productions
- Length: 14–46 minutes

Publication
- No. of seasons: 1
- No. of episodes: 43
- Original release: April 2, 2025
- Updates: Wednesdays

Related
- Website: www.dc.com/highvolume

DC High Volume: Batman is an American superhero podcast series based on the DC Comics superhero Batman, which debuted in April 2025.

The weekly serialized podcast adapts seminal comics from the Batman canon, Batman: Year One by writer Frank Miller and artist David Mazzucchelli, as well as Batman: The Long Halloween and Batman: Dark Victory by writer Jeph Loeb and artist Tim Sale.

With the release of episode 43, showrunners Fred Greenhalgh and Roshan Singh Sambhi announced that the podcast would go on hiatus in order to focus on future chapters.

== Plot ==
Episodes 1–4 adapt Frank Miller and David Mazzucchelli's Batman: Year One, following Bruce Wayne's first year as the vigilante Batman and James Gordon's struggles navigating Gotham City as an honorable man working amongst a corrupt police force.

Episodes 5–17 adapt Jeph Loeb and Tim Sale's Batman: The Long Halloween, which centers around Batman, Gordon, and Harvey Dent's efforts to catch a mysterious killer known as Holiday. The story culminates with Harvey Dent's scarring, both mentally and physically, and his transformation into Two-Face.

Episodes 18–30 adapt Loeb and Sale's Batman: Dark Victory, the direct sequel to The Long Halloween. It follows Batman as he pursues another serial killer "Hangman" and takes on a child protégé, 'Robin'.

Episodes 31–43 adapt Darwyn Cooke's Batman: Ego, Batman: The Gauntlet by Bruce Canwell and Lee Weeks, Nightwing: Year One, Batman: The Killing Joke, Oracle: Year One, and the story Date Knight (from the first issue of Solo) by Darwyn Cooke and Tim Sale.

== Cast ==
- Jason Spisak as Batman/Bruce Wayne
- Jay Paulson as Lt. James Gordon
- Reba Buhr as Selina Kyle/Catwoman and Introduction Narrator
- Mike Starr as Carmine Falcone
- Simon Vance as Alfred Pennyworth
- Dan Gill as The Joker (The Long Halloween)
  - Troy Baker as The Joker (The Killing Joke)
- Adam O'Byrne as Two-Face
- Cristina Rosato as Sofia Falcone
- Jesse Burch as The Riddler
- Michelle Lukes as Poison Ivy
- Kevin Smith as The Penguin
- Marcella Lentz-Pope as Gilda Dent
- Jeph Loeb as Unnamed Doctor (Matthew Thorne/Crime Doctor)
- Nick Fisher as Dick Grayson/Robin
  - Will Friedle as Dick Grayson/Nightwing
- Shelby Young as Barbara Gordon/Batgirl
- Chester Rushing as Clark Kent/Superman
- Stephanie Koenig as Lois Lane
- Holland Roden
- Danny Nucci
- Eric Lange
- Keith Szarabajka
- Stephanie Sheh
- Richard Epcar
