= I'm Telling the Truth but I'm Lying =

2019 memoir by Bassey Ikpi

- Author: Bassey Ikpi
- Genre: Memoir
- Publisher: Harper Perennial
- Publication date: 2019

I'm Telling the Truth but I'm Lying is a memoir by Nigerian spoken word artist Bassey Ikpi published by Harper Perennial an imprint of HarperCollins in 2019.

== Plot ==
The book is described as "a deep personal work that chronicles the Nigerian-American author's life living with bipolar II disorder and anxiety, and a woman of color and combating the stigma surrounding it." The essays cover her difficulties as a young child re-locating from Nigeria to America, struggling with household tensions, depression and hospitalization, leading up to her eventual diagnosis of and treatment for bipolar II disorder.

== Development ==
On May 4, 2017, it was announced that her first book, a memoir titled Making Friends With Giants would be published by Harper Perennial in 2018. The book, eventually renamed I'm Telling the Truth But I'm Lying was published in August 2019.

== Reception ==
The book became a New York Times bestseller. Essence described it as a "stunning essay collection". Kola Tubosun calls it "a kind of map for those interested in learning about how mental illness affects people."
