= The Women in the Castle =

2017 novel by Jessica Shattuck

- First edition
- Author: Jessica Shattuck
- Language: English
- Genre: Historical Novel
- Published: 2017
- Publisher: William Morrow
- Publication place: United States
- ISBN: 9780062563668

The Women in the Castle is a 2017 novel by Jessica Shattuck. The book, which became a New York Times Bestseller, is about three German women during and after World War II. The three are widows of conspirators involved in the assassination attempt on Hitler, and each deals with the fallout of her personal life and the devastation around her differently.

== Background ==
According to the author, she grew up with a deep sense of shame for being half-German. She was embarrassed by her mother's accent, and avoided family tree projects at school. She inherited this shame and hatred of Germany from her mother, who had arrived in the United States at age 16 to work as an au pair, and remained on an academic scholarship. The mother had been born during the war, Germany's ugliest episode, and her parents had been Nazis. When she married, they were not invited.

As an adult, Shattuck began to make sense of her complex emotions, and develop curiosity as to the experiences of "ordinary" Germans of the Nazi era. She grew more interested in her family history after her mother's death, and spent a summer during college in Germany interviewing her grandmother. The grandmother was very open about her history and attitudes, as Shattuck wrote: "Unlike many Germans her age, including my grandfather, she did not want to sweep these subjects under the carpet. As I knew her, she was not a racist or an anti-Semite. And she wanted to explain how it was possible that she could have been swept up in a movement that later became synonymous with evil. She did not want to be forgiven. She wanted to be understood. This is, I think, an important and often confused distinction. And in some ways, it formed the foundation of my novel."

Another source of inspiration for the novel was a family friend whose father had been executed for participating in a plot to assassinate Hitler. Shattuck was struck by the difference in the life narrative of those whose German connections were on the "right" side of history, and set out to explore both sides in greater depth.

== Plot summary ==
The story begins at the site of a Bavarian castle in 1938, with detailed descriptions of the society of the pre-war days in Germany among a certain class of landed aristocrats. Countess Marianne von Lingenfels is hosting her family’s annual party, at which men wearing Nazi insignia parade casually through the grounds, while inside, privately, a small group of young men, including Marianne’s husband, are plotting armed resistance against the nation’s leader, Adolf Hitler.

The novel then advances to the year 1945. The war has ended and the conspirators have been executed after their failed attempt to assassinate Hitler. Marianne, back at the same crumbling castle, is determined to "do right" by the wives and children of the men who died trying to save her homeland from a tyrant. She is raising three children by herself, in occupied post-Nazi Germany. She then rescues 6-year-old Martin, the son of her dearest childhood friend, from a Nazi reeducation home. Together, they make their way across the smoldering wreckage of their homeland to Berlin, where Martin’s mother, the beautiful and naive Benita, in the hands of the occupying Red Army. Finally, she locates Ania, another resister’s wife, and her two sons, now refugees in one of the many camps that house the millions displaced by the war.

As Marianne assembles this makeshift family from the ruins of her husband’s resistance movement, she is certain their shared pain and circumstances will hold them together. But devastated by trauma, broken by the deprivations and brutality they suffered in the war, and burdened by their own guilt, Marianne finds that nothing is as black and white as she thought. Each woman's experiences, attitudes, and feelings about the war, their husbands, Germany and each other are at the core of the book's narrative, as well as how they see the rest of their lives, and what they do to get there.

== Characters ==
The main characters are the three women who are "the women in the castle":

- Marianne von Lingenfels: A fierce, cultured, vehemently anti-Nazi aristocrat with a sense of righteousness that is the source of her strength—and, ultimately, her greatest weakness. Her husband, Albrecht, was involved in a plot to assassinate Hitler, together with Marianne's childhood friend Connie Flederman, and several other men.
- Benita Fledermann: Connie's young new bride, she is from a peasant background, non-political, but like most of her milieu, participating in the Nazi rush of nationalism. She is disappointed by her marriage to the young aristocrat, but is very devoted to their son.
- Ania Grabarek: A woman of fervent patriotism and dark secrets who is far different from what she appears. Unlike the first two women, she is unknown to the reader at the beginning of the book - she comes into the story during the devastation of post-war Europe, having learned how to keep herself and her two sons safe in all the hardest ways.

== Reception ==
The book was mostly well-received, and rapidly became a New York Times bestseller. According to NPR, the book offers a never-before seen perspective of Germany during the Nazi period. Carrie Callaghan, for the Washington Independent, called the novel "brave" and wrote "'The Women in the Castle' pleads the case for humanity as both dreadful and beautiful." Publishers Weekly also called the book's perspective "unique", and praised Shattuck's exacting research, which contributed to the novel's historic realism. Judith Reveal called Shattuck "a genius at character development and narrative description" in her New York Journal of Books review, and Mary Pols, in her New York Times review, wrote "Shattuck’s characters represent the range of responses to fascism. Her achievement — beyond unfolding a plot that surprises and devastates — is in her subtle exploration of what a moral righteousness like Marianne’s looks like in the aftermath of war, when communities and lives must be rebuilt, together."

=== Recognition ===
- New York Times bestseller
- Short list, New York Times best fiction 2017
- Goodreads Choice Awards Semifinalist
