= Nina Riggs =

American writer and poet

Nina Ellen Riggs
- Born: March 29, 1977
- Died: February 26, 2017 (aged 39)
- Occupations: Writer; poet
- Spouse: John Duberstein
- Children: 2

Nina Ellen Riggs (March 29, 1977 – February 26, 2017) was an American writer and poet. Her best known work is her memoir, The Bright Hour, detailing her journey as a mother with incurable breast cancer. It was published shortly after her death. The book received critical acclaim. Riggs also contributed an article to New York Times series Modern Love.

Riggs was born in San Francisco, California. She was the great-great-great-granddaughter of Ralph Waldo Emerson. She received a bachelor's degree in creative writing from the University of North Carolina at Chapel Hill and a master of fine arts degree in poetry from UNC at Greensboro.

Riggs was married to John Duberstein, an attorney with whom she had two sons. They lived in Greensboro, North Carolina.

== Bibliography ==
=== The Bright Hour (2017) ===
The Bright Hour was published June 6, 2017 by Simon & Schuster. The book was a New York Times Best Seller and received starred reviews from Kirkus Reviews, Publishers Weekly, and Library Journal. It was also selected as one of the best books of 2017 by

The book was well-received:

- 2017 Goodreads Choice Award Nominee for Memoir & Autobiography
- Best Books of 2017 by The Washington Post, O Magazine, NPR, Bitch, and Medium
- Most Anticipated Summer Reading Selection by The Washington Post, Entertainment Weekly, Glamour, The Seattle Times, Vulture, InStyle, Bookpage, Bookriot, Real Simple, and The Atlanta Journal-Constitution

=== Lucky, Lucky (2009) ===
Lucky, Lucky, a poetry chapbook, was published in 2009 by Finishing Line Press.
