= Alice Blanchard =

American author

- Born: February 28, 1959 (age 66); Hyannis, Massachusetts, United States
- Education: Emerson College (BFA)
- Spouse: Doug Dowling (m. 1993)

Alice Blanchard (born 1959) is an American suspense novelist. She won the Katherine Anne Porter Prize for Fiction for her book of stories The Stuntman's Daughter.

== Early life and education ==
Blanchard was born February 28, 1959, in Hyannis, Massachusetts. She received a Bachelor of Fine Arts in film studies from Emerson College.

== Career ==
Blanchard published her first book, a short story collection titled The Stuntman's Daughter: And Other Stories, with University of North Texas Press in 1996. The 12-story collection won the Katherine Anne Porter Prize in Short Fiction for that year.

Her first novel, Darkness Peering, was published by Bantam Books in 1999. It was named one of the New York Times' Notable Books, a Barnes & Noble Best Mystery, and a Book Sense Pick. The novel was published in nine countries, and film adaptation rights were sold to Propaganda Films. She has since published three additional standalone novels: The Breathtaker (2003), Life Sentences (2005), and A Breath After Drowning (2018). The Breathtaker was an official NBC Today Book Club selection in January 2004.

Blanchard also authored the Natalie Lockhart series, which consists of four novels: Trace of Evil (2019), The Wicked Hour (2020), The Witching Tree (2021), and The Shadow Girls (2023). Trace of Evil follows a female rookie detective investigating the murder of a popular high school teacher who has eerie ties to the murder of a teenage girl 20 years ago. The series includes witch accusation and obsession with black magic deep in the woods of the fictional suburban community of Burning Lake, New York.

== Awards and honors ==
Blanchard has received a PEN Syndicated Fiction Award, a New Letters Literary Award, and a Centrum Artists in Residence Fellowship.

Awards for Blanchard's writing
Year	Work	Award	Result	Ref.
1989	"Corporation Beach"	New Letters Literary Award for Fiction	Winner	
1990	"Claybottom Lake"	PEN Syndicated Fiction Award	Winner	
1994	"Puddle Tongue"	Iowa Woman Fiction Competition	Winner	
1994	Blindfold	H. E. Francis Short Story Competition	Finalist	
1994	"The Blue Pontiac	Writers' Workshop International Fiction Contest	Honorable mention	
1996	"Make Believe	Emerging Writers Fiction Contest	Finalist	
1996	The Stuntman's Daughter	Katherine Anne Porter Prize for Fiction	Winner	

== Personal life ==
Blanchard married writer Doug Dowling in January 1993.

== Publications ==
=== Natalie Lockhart series ===
- Trace of Evil. Minotaur. 2019. ISBN 978-1-250-20571-1.
- The Wicked Hour. New York: Minotaur Books. 2020. ISBN 978-1-250-20573-5.
- The Witching Tree. New York: Minotaur Books. 2021. ISBN 978-1-250-78304-2.
- The Shadow Girls. New York: Minotaur Books. 2023. ISBN 978-1-250-78308-0.

=== Standalone novels ===
- Darkness Peering. New York: Bantam Books. 1999. ISBN 978-0-553-11153-8.
- The Breathtaker. New York: Warner Books. 2003. ISBN 978-0-446-53139-9.
- Life Sentences. New York: Warner Books. 2005. ISBN 978-0-446-57672-7.
- A Breath After Drowning. London: Titan Books Limited. 2018. ISBN 978-1-78565-641-5.

=== Short story collections ===
- The Stuntman's Daughter: And Other Stories. Denton: University of North Texas Press. 1996. ISBN 978-1-57441-009-9.
