= Bassey Ikpi =

Nigerian spoken word poet

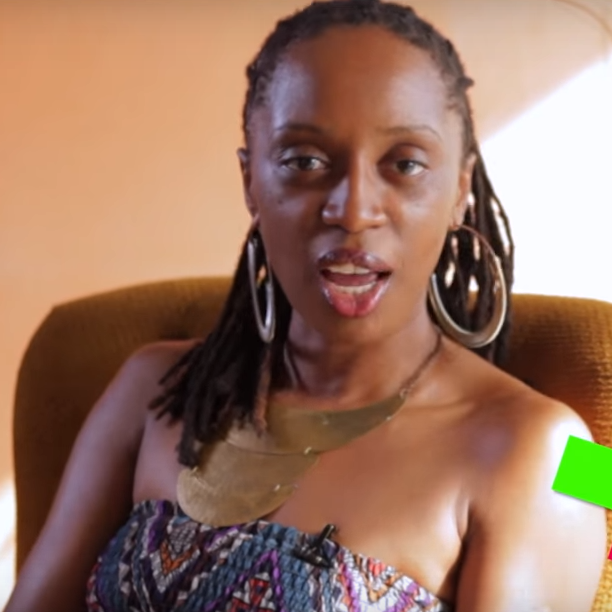
- Bassey Ikpi in with Folu Storms of NdaniTV in 2016
- Born: 3 August 1976 (age 50); Ikom, Cross River State, Nigeria
- Occupations: Poet; writer; mental health advocate
- Notable work: I'm Telling The Truth But I'm Lying

Bassey Ikpi is a Nigerian-born American spoken-word artist, writer, and mental health advocate. She has appeared on HBO's Russell Simmons Presents Def Poetry five times and her poetry has opened shows for Grammy Award-winning artists. She's also the New York Times bestselling author of I'm Telling The Truth But I'm Lying. In 2020 she judged the Indiana Review Creative Nonfiction Prize. She also features on the OkayAfrica's 100 Women campaign 2020 honoree list, which celebrates women building infrastructure for future African generations.

== Early life and work ==
Ikpi was born in Ikom, Cross River State, Nigeria, on August 3, 1976, to a Nigerian family who were originally from Ugep. When she was four years old, she relocated with her parents to the Stillwater, Oklahoma, United States where she lived until she was 13. Then she moved to Greenbelt, Maryland, a suburb of Washington DC.

She attended the University of Maryland, Baltimore County to study English. While in college, she began performing her poetry on the Baltimore and Washington DC open mic circuit. She left the course in her final year to move to New York City. Ikpi's career began on the American talk show Teen Summit, which aired on Black Entertainment Television. She then moved, aged around 21, to New York City for more opportunities. It was there she discovered "the Louder Arts Movement", the Nuyorican Poets Café, and later the Def Poetry Jam. It was also there where she says learnt how to take her writing seriously. She became a successful spoken-word artist in the city and was featured on the Def Poetry Jam TV show for 5 seasons, touring with the company for a year starting at the Edinburgh Fringe Festival, and then for another year doing the National tour with the original Broadway cast. She was on tour with Def Poetry Jam from 2001 to 2004.

== Bipolar diagnosis ==
In January 2004, in Chicago, during one of her tours around the country for the Def Poetry Jam, she had a breakdown from depression, anxiety and stress-induced insomnia. A few days later, in New York City, she was diagnosed with bipolar II disorder; she wrote about it publicly in an opinion piece in the Huffington Post in January 2011. She has also spoken publicly about it in many public fora, as a way to help others overcome the stigma and understand the struggles. She has also written many freelance pieces for several media outlets on the topic of mental health and pop culture commentary, including Ebony, Huffington Post, Essence, xoJane and The Root."

== Return to Nigeria ==
She returned to Nigeria first when she was 12, and later when she was 18. In 2012, at age 36, she returned to Lagos, Nigeria to work in spoken word, writing, and television. While in Lagos, she organised what she called the "Basseyworld Presents Naija Poetry Slam", the first national poetry slam competition in the country, in September 2012.

In 2014, months after hundreds of school children were kidnapped from Chibok in Nigeria, Ikpi organised 'Do The Write Thing', an event to show support through the spoken word for the Bring Back Our Girls campaign. She also recorded a song with popular Nigerian artiste 2Face Idibia in support of the movement called 'Break The Silence'.

== The Siwe Project and No Shame Day ==
Ikpi founded The Siwe Project, named after Siwe Monsanto, the fifteen-year-old daughter of her friend, who died by suicide in 2011 after bouts of depression, as a way to encourage people with mental illnesses to "be inspired to seek help and to manage their illnesses and to not be afraid or ashamed to talk about it." The Siwe Project is registered as "a global non-profit dedicated to promoting mental health awareness throughout the international black community." The project was launched in December 2011.

On July 2, 2013, The Siwe project held the first "No Shame Day" on social media, where people struggling with depression or mental illnesses are encouraged to post their stories without shame to the world.

== I'm Telling The Truth But I'm Lying ==
On May 4, 2017, it was announced that Ikpe's first book, a memoir titled Making Friends With Giants would be published by Harper Perennial in 2018.

The book, eventually renamed I'm Telling the Truth But I'm Lying was published in August 2019, and quickly became a New York Times bestseller. Essence described it as a "stunning essay collection". Kola Tubosun called it "a kind of map for those interested in learning about how mental illness affects people."

The book is described as "a deep personal work that chronicles the Nigerian-American author's life living with bipolar II disorder and anxiety, and a woman of color and combating the stigma surrounding it." The essays cover her difficulties as a young child re-locating from Nigeria to America, struggling with household tensions, depression and hospitalization, leading up to her eventual diagnosis of and treatment for bipolar II disorder.

== Selected works ==
- "Sometimes silence is the loudest kind of noise" - Spoken Word - Def Jam Season 2, Episode 3 (2003)
- "Homeward" - Spoken Word - Def Jam Season 3, Episode 3 (2004)
- "Diallo" - Spoken Word - Def Jam Season 4, Episode 3 (2005)
- "I Want to Kiss You" - Spoken Word - Def Jam Season 5, Episode 2 (2006)
- "Apology to My Unborn" - Spoken Word - Def Jam Season 6, Episode 5 (2007)
- "Invisible Barriers" - Spoken Word for "Girl Effect" (2016)
