= Jessica Shattuck =

American author

- Education: Harvard University, Columbia University
- Occupation: Writer
- Writing career
- Notable works: The Hazards of Good Breeding, The Women in the Castle

Jessica Shattuck is an American author. Her debut novel, The Hazards of Good Breeding, was a finalist for the L.L. Winship/PEN New England Award and a New York Times notable book, both in 2003. She subsequently published the novel Perfect Life, in 2009. Her third novel, The Women in the Castle (2017), became a New York Times best seller.

== Life ==
Shattuck graduated from Harvard University in 1994, and received her MFA from Columbia University in 2001.

== Works ==
- The Hazards of Good Breeding, New York: W.W. Norton, 2003. ISBN 9780393324839, OCLC 55803690
- Perfect Life: A Novel, New York: W.W. Norton & Co., 2009. ISBN 9780393304596, OCLC 709592813
- The Women in the Castle, London: Zaffre, 2017. ISBN 9781785763625, OCLC 1063653390
- Last House. New York: William Morrow. 2024. ISBN 978-0-06-297989-6.
