= Phil Jourdan =

French writer

- Born: 1987 (age 38–39)
- Occupation: Writer
- Writing career
- Genres: Literature, magical realism, postmodernism, memoir
- Website: slothrop.com/publications/

Phil Jourdan is a French author, musician and publisher based in the UK. His literary work is often experimental in nature, and he has been called "an avant gardist through and through". His first book, Praise of Motherhood, was noted for its unconventional approach to the genre of memoir, as well as Jourdan's refusal to ‘allow the constraints of perspective or chronology to guide the text’ and "painfully honest".

He is the author of three books:

- What Precision, Such Restraint (2013, Perfect Edge Books)
- John Gardner: A Tiny Eulogy (2012, Punctum books)
- Praise of Motherhood (2011, Zero Books), a 2012 IndieFab Award Finalist. Translated into Spanish as Madre in memoriam.

His work has been featured in Chuck Palahniuk's anthology, Burnt Tongues.

He fronts the rock band Paris and the Hiltons, whose song "Quentin Will End Up Killing Himself" was a winner in the 2013 Independent Music Awards.

His translation of Portuguese novelist Jose Luis Peixoto's first book, Morreste-me, was published in 2011 in the University of Warwick's literary journal, The Warwick Review.

Jourdan is one of the founders of the online writing workshop, LitReactor, and of the political imprint Repeater Books. He has worked with various presses, including Perfect Edge (fiction) and Zero Books (political nonfiction), and is an editor at Angry Robot and Repeater Books.

As of January 2018, Jourdan has been writing and producing for former S Club 7 member Paul Cattermole with a view to completing a comeback album in time for Christmas 2018.
