= RM Johnson =

American novelist

- Rodney Marc Johnson
- Education: University Of Louisiana
- Occupations: Writer, novelist
- Writing career
- Genre: Fiction
- Website: www.rmnovels.com

RM Johnson is an American writer, the author of nine adult urban fiction novels and one young adult fiction novel. He is best known for stories dealing with love, sex and the various challenges faced by African Americans. Johnson's works have appeared on the Essence magazine's bestselling books list.

Works written by Johnson include The Harris Men, The Million Dollar Divorce, Love Frustration and The Million Dollar Demise. His first non-fiction work, Why Men Fear Marriage, was published on July 28, 2009. In 2011, he released a collaborative work with the late E. Lynn Harris, No One in the World.

== Works ==
=== Fiction ===
- The Harris Men
- Father Found
- The Harris Family
- Dating Games
- Love Frustration
- The Million Dollar Divorce
- Do You Take This Woman?
- The Million Dollar Deception
- The Million Dollar Demise
- No One in the World (with E. Lynn Harris)
- Deceit and Devotion
- Bishop
- Bishop 2
- Bishop 3: Fall From Grace
- Keeping Secrets
- Keeping the Secret 2
- Keeping the Secret 3
- My Wife's Baby: I Am Not A Murderer

=== Non-fiction ===
- Why Men Fear Marriage? The Surprising Truth Behind Why So Many Men Can't Commit

=== Young adult fiction ===
- Stacie & Cole
