= Beautiful Ruins =

2012 bestselling novel by Jess Walter

- First edition
- Author: Jess Walter
- Publisher: Harper
- Publication date: 2012

Beautiful Ruins is a 2012 bestselling novel by Jess Walter. It is his sixth novel. The novel is a social satire critiquing Hollywood culture. Though not the explicit focus of the novel, receiving very little direct appearances in the novel, the characters' lives revolve around Elizabeth Taylor and her role in the movie Cleopatra, and the subsequent love affair between Taylor and Richard Burton.

== Style and themes ==
As Seattle Times critic Mary Gwinn notes, the novel is a social satire which explores human nature and satirizing the Hollywood culture that is at the center of the novel. She writes "Beneath Walter's black comic's mask beats the brain of an ethical philosopher and the heart of a romantic. Not everyone in "Beautiful Ruins" gets what they want. But they do get what they need."

In part, the novel is an epistolary novel, relying heavily on excerpts of letters, screenplays and novels being written by the characters, in order to demonstrate different parts of their characters, and highlight the absurdity of their ideas. Similarly, the novel includes significant leaps of time and geography, with much of the early parts of the novel set in an Italian coastal hotel, but later parts are set in Hollywood; Edinburgh; Seattle; Florence, Italy; Portland, Ore.; Truckee, Calif.; and Sandpoint, Idaho. Critic Janet Maslin describes the novel as "more intuitive than linear, a believer in capricious destiny with a fine, freewheeling sense of humor. The deeply romantic heart of 'Beautiful Ruins' is better expressed by constant circling than it would by any head-on approach."

== Critical reception ==
Washington Post reviewer Allegra Goodman wrote, "Adept at mixing flavors and textures, Walter whips together dying beauty, enduring love, war-shadowed Italy, haunting landscapes, veiled identity." Goodman compared the novel to The English Patient, noting its relatively strong cross cultural, cross time aspects. Seattle Times reviewer Mary Gwinn applauded the wit of the novel's satire, noting how the novel is an "ambitious new novel" which "creates an ensemble of memorable characters and runs them through the Hollywood entertainment mill."

== Film adaptation ==
In April 2013, Cross Creek Pictures and Smuggler Films announced a feature film adaptation in the works. Todd Field and Jess Walter were confirmed to be writing the screenplay, with Field set to direct. In November of that year, it was announced Imogen Poots was attached, with filming scheduled to begin in Italy in May 2014. In September 2016, it was reported that Sam Mendes signed on to produce and possibly direct the film, with a new screenplay by Noah Harpster and Micah Fitzerman-Blue. However, in June 2020, Niki Caro was announced as director.

== Audiobook ==
An audiobook version was released in 2012 by Harper Audio, read by Edoardo Ballerini.
