= Simon Vance =

British audiobook narrator

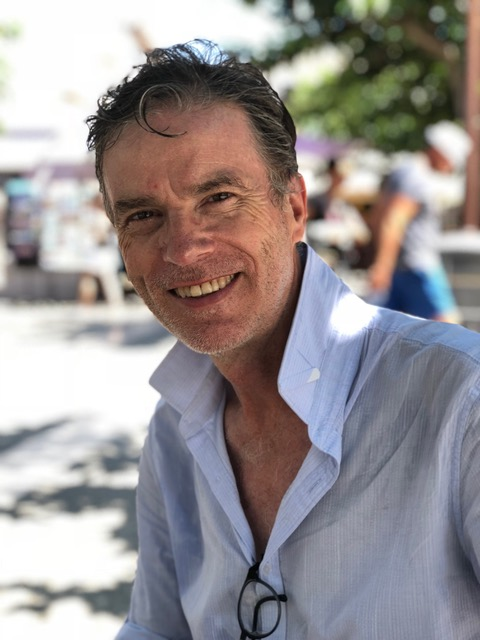
- Simon Vance in 2018
- Born: December 16, 1955 (age 70); Brighton, East Sussex, England
- Occupations: Actor, Narrator
- Years active: 1975–present
- Website: Simon Vance

Simon Vance (born December 16, 1955) is an English audiobook narrator and actor who performs contemporary literary works as well as classics, children's books, and nonfiction. He has won 16 Audie Awards since 2002. Specializing in single-voice narration, he was named the American Library Association's Booklist Magazine Voice of Choice in 2008, and has earned AudioFile Magazine's Earphones Award for more than 60 performances since 1998. He has also narrated audiobooks under the names of Richard Matthews and Robert Whitfield. He lives in Los Angeles, California.

== Early career ==
Simon Vance was born in Brighton, England, on December 16, 1955, to John Hazlett Vance and Rosemary Elizabeth Catherine Vance (née Higgs). In a 2008 interview with AudioFile Magazine, he recalled making his first audiobook recording at the age of six when he was offered a microphone into which he read Winnie the Pooh. In 1975, he performed his first radio broadcast, over BBC Radio Brighton. He joined BBC Radio 4 in 1983 where he remained until 1992. During this same decade-long period, he also recorded audiobooks for the UK's Royal National Institute of Blind People.

In 1992, he immigrated to the United States, settling in California. By 2001 he was becoming a recognized male narrator who could perform a range of genres and styles, including James Bond thrillers, British classics from Charles Dickens and Sir Walter Scott, biographies of historic leaders including Winston Churchill, science fiction, political science, and nonfiction.

== Career highlights ==
Vance's narration work has received praise from AudioFile Magazine. The American Library Association's review journal, Booklist Magazine has given him a number of starred reviews, including those for his narrations of Mick Wall's When Giants Walked the Earth: A biography of Led Zeppelin (Blackstone, 2010) and Lyndsay Faye's The Whole Art of Detection: The lost mysteries of Sherlock Holmes (HighBridge, 2017). In 2008, librarian and readers' advisory developer Joyce Saricks wrote in Booklist that Vance brings several strengths to his narration work: his ability to capture the author's tone, his capacity to inhabit characters in his storytelling, and his facility with accents and knowledge of languages.

Vance's interest in books, literature, and authors has led him on special projects related to his narration work. When hired by Recorded Books to narrate Alan Moore's Jerusalem, a novel of more than 1,100 pages, he traveled to Northampton, England, to spend time with the author as part of his preparation for reading the 61-hour recording. The visit provided the opportunity for Vance to receive correct pronunciations Moore had bestowed on some characters in the novel, as well as to accompany the author around his neighborhood, with specific places in it that Moore had included within his fiction.

Vance's catalog of performances numbers about 1000 titles.

== Awards ==
Between 2002 and 2006, Vance was nominated for six Audie Awards. In 2006, his nomination in the Science Fiction category also became his first win, for his narration of Market Forces (Tantor Media, 2005). Vance hosted the awards in 2018. He has been nominated for more than forty Audie Awards, and has won for the following:

Audie Awards
| Book | Publication Year | Award category | Publisher |
|---|---|---|---|
| Market Forces | 2005 | Best narration in science fiction | Tantor Media |
| Dune | 2007 | Best narration of science fiction (shared) | Macmillan Audio |
| Great Expectations | 2008 | Best narration of a classic | Tantor Media |
| The Girl Who Kicked the Hornet's Nest | 2010 | Best narration of a thriller/suspense | Random House |
| The Life and Adventures of Nicholas Nickleby | 2011 | Best narration of a classic | Tantor Media |
| The King's Speech: How One Man Saved the British Monarchy | 2011 | Best solo narration - male | Tantor Media |
| Dracula | 2012 | Distinguished achievement in production (shared); Best multi-voiced performance (shared) | Audible, Inc. |
| Bring Up the Bodies | 2012 | Best narration of literary fiction | Macmillan Audio |
| The Tao of Pooh | 2012 | Best narration of a personal development work | Tantor Media |
| The Elephant Whisperer: My Life with the Herd in the African Wild | 2013 | Best narration of biography/memoir | Tantor Media |
| The Complete Sherlock Holmes: The Heirloom Edition | 2013 | Best narration of a classic | Brilliance Audio |
| Euphoria: A Novel | 2014 | Best narration of literary fiction (shared) | Blackstone Audio, Inc. |
| Jerusalem | 2016 | Best male narrator | Recorded Books |
| The Girl Who Takes an Eye for an Eye | 2017 | Best narration of a mystery | Random House Audio |
| The Punishment She Deserves | 2018 | Best narration of a mystery | Penguin Random House Audio |

He has earned Earphone Award notices among reviews there, including one for his performance of Kenneth Grahame's The Wind in the Willows and Charles Nicholl's literary biography The Lodger Shakespeare (Tantor Audio).

== Select acting credits ==
Onscreen

| Year | Title | Role | Notes |
|---|---|---|---|
| 1997–2001 | Nash Bridges | Concierge/Selwyn Webb/English Henchman/Neville Peck | 4 episodes |
| 2006 | The Evidence | Andrew Lasky | Episode: "Wine and Die" |
| 2013 | Criminal Minds | Gil Patterson | Episode: "Bully" |
| 2015 | Next | Connext Ad Announcer | Web-series, 5 episodes |
| 2015 | Masters of Sex | Mr. Mosher | Episode: "Party of Four" |

Voiceover

| Year | Title | Role | Notes |
|---|---|---|---|
| 2020–2022 | The Sandman | Lucien | Audio drama |
| 2025–present | DC High Volume: Batman | Alfred Pennyworth | Scripted podcast |
