= Simon Prebble =

British-American narrator

- Born: Simon Micawber Prebble; 13 February 1942 (age 84); Croydon, Surrey, England
- Occupation: Narrator
- Years active: 1960–present
- Spouse: Marie-Janine Hellstrom

Simon Micawber Prebble (born 13 February 1942) is a British-American narrator. Initially a stage actor, he has a wide-ranging career in television drama, was a game show announcer in Britain, and a voice-over narrator for film and television. In recent years, he has narrated a large number of audiobooks and received an Audie (Audiobook award) in 2010.

== Early life ==
Born and raised in Croydon, Surrey, Prebble is the son of the historian, novelist and screenwriter John Prebble and fashion artist Betty Prebble.

== Career ==
In 1960, he attended Guildhall School of Music and Drama, London, and began his acting career in one of the UK's first live television soap operas, Home Tonight, with David Hemmings. For the next eleven years he worked extensively on radio and television and in provincial repertory theatre, including a year with Ian McKellen's Hamlet. In 1972, in a change of direction, he worked as a continuity announcer for Southern Television. Then, in 1973, Prebble joined Capital Radio, the first legal commercial music station in the UK, where he hosted a daily news magazine programme London's Day. He then embarked on a freelance career as a presenter and voice-over announcer, including thirteen years as the promo voice of Thames Television, and from 1984, he was the announcer for the British version of the game show The Price Is Right with Leslie Crowther.

In 1990, Prebble moved to New York, where he continued doing voice-over work. As well as recording numerous radio and television commercials, he hosted and narrated several television documentary series, notably Target-Mafia. He also voiced the Computer in Courage the Cowardly Dog, which is probably the most famous role of his in the US. His film voice work includes playing Ernest Shackleton in the 2000 documentary The Endurance; he would reprise this role (as well as the complete narration) in 2007 for Alfred Lansing's seminal 1959 book Endurance: Shackleton's Incredible Voyage. In 1996, he was a lead actor for a year (as the villain Martin Chedwyn) on the American daily soap opera As the World Turns.

In the US, his narration of audiobooks had now become his main occupation. Reviewing the audiobook edition of Jasper Fforde's The Big Over Easy in 2005, Publishers Weekly found that:

"Prebble's sonorous British voice is ideally suited to narrating this whimsical, fractured fairy tale; his tone and pacing match Fforde's prose perfectly, and his subtle vocal acrobatics enable him to amusingly bring to life the novel's wildly divergent cast of characters. Despite its many virtues, this is probably Fforde's weakest novel, lacking the literary sophistication of the Thursday Next books. But Prebble's performance easily makes this Fforde's best audiobook to date. Prebble's vibrant, all-star narration more than makes up for them".

As of 2020, he has recorded well over 950 titles. As one of AudioFile magazine's 'Golden Voices' and 'Best Voices of the Century', his work has gained him five 'Listen Up' awards, thirty-seven Earphone awards, and in 2005, he was named 'Narrator of the Year' by Publishers Weekly. Nominated seventeen times for the 'Audies' (the audiobook 'Oscars'), he was finally awarded a coveted 'Audie' in 2010, the year he was also named Booklist's 'Voice of Choice'.

== Personal life ==
In 2003, at Chiswick House, west London, he married Swedish graphic artist, Marie-Janine Hellstrom. In 2007, both he and his wife became US citizens.
