= Jim Lynch (writer) =

American author (born 1961)

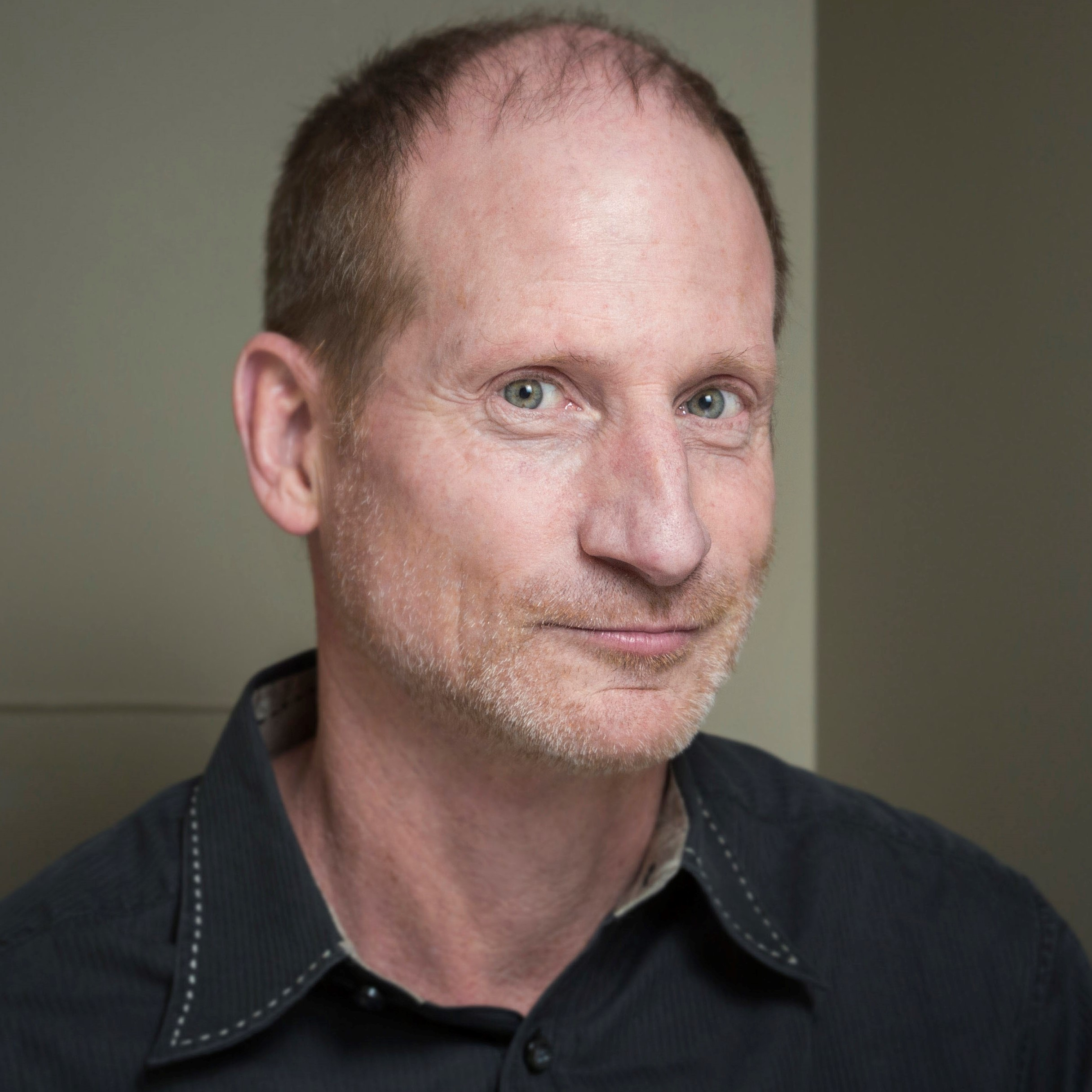
- Born: 1961 (age 64–65)
- Education: University of Washington
- Occupation: Author
- Website: www.jimlynchbooks.com/index.htm

Jim Lynch (born 1961) is an American author of four novels. His work has been compared to authors including John Steinbeck, Ken Kesey, Tom Robbins, and Richard Russo.

Lynch's first novel, The Highest Tide, became a bestseller in the United Kingdom after the coming-of-age story was featured on the Richard & Judy book club television show in England. It went on to receive the Pacific Northwest Booksellers Association Award in 2006. His second novel, Border Songs, set along the rural western end of the Canada–United States border, won the Washington State Book Award for Fiction and was a finalist for the American Booksellers Association award for best fiction in 2009.

Truth Like the Sun, Lynch's third novel, (the title based on an Elvis Presley quote, "Truth is like the sun. You can shut it out for a time, but it ain't going away.") was released in April 2012. Set in Seattle, during the 1962 World's Fair, a time when Presley and other celebrities, including Vice President Lyndon Johnson visited it as well as in 2001, the story involves the investigation of a city legend by an ambitious reporter. Critics have likened the novel to movies about American power and corruption, such as Chinatown, Citizen Kane, and All the President's Men. His most recent novel, Before the Wind, was released in April 2016. It stars a gifted and volatile family obsessed with sailing. Translation rights for the novel have been sold to publishers in France and Spain as well.

== Career ==
Lynch grew up near Seattle, Washington. Graduating with English and Communications degrees from the University of Washington, he subsequently reported for newspapers in Alaska, Virginia and Washington, D.C., as well as The Spokesman-Review, The Seattle Times and The Oregonian. Along the way his national honors included the 1995 Gerald Loeb Award for Small Newspapers for "Wasteland", the Livingston Young Journalist Award for national reporting in 1996, and the George Polk Award for environmental reporting with Karen Dorn Steele in 1995.

Lynch now lives with his wife and daughter in Olympia, Washington, on a bay near where a rare deep sea fish washed up on a beach, inspiring his first novel, The Highest Tide.

== Bibliography ==
- The Highest Tide (2005) Bloomsbury USA ISBN 978-1-58234-605-2
- Border Songs (2009) Alfred A. Knopf ISBN 978-0-307-27117-4
- Truth Like the Sun (2012) Alfred A. Knopf ISBN 978-0-307-95868-6
- Before the Wind (2016) Alfred A. Knopf ISBN 978-0-307-95898-3
