= Grover Gardner =

American narrator of audiobooks (born 1956)

Grover Gardner (b 1956) is an American narrator of audiobooks. As of May 2018, he has narrated over 1,200 books. He was the Publishers Weekly "Audiobook Narrator of the Year" (2005) and is among AudioFile magazine's "Best Voices of the Century".

== Biography ==
- Video; Grover Gardner narrates
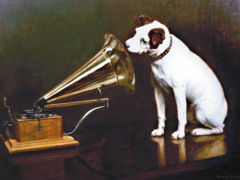
- Leader of the Pack; Listen & Live, July 2012

Gardner is a native of Pennsylvania. He attended high school in Belgium. He graduated from Florida's Rollins College in 1978 as a theater major.

In 1981, Gardner was an actor in the Washington, D.C. region, working at Woolly Mammoth Theatre Company under Howard Shalwitz. He won a number of lead actor awards for plays such as Metamorphoses and The Rocky Horror Show.

Gardner heard about and auditioned for the Library of Congress' Books for the Blind Program. He worked at fellow theater actor Flo Gibson's Audio Book Contractors in the DC region to produce classic literature on cassette tape. Over time, his acting career tapered off and audiobooks took over. Eventually he established his own independent studio in Maryland where he recorded books for Books on Tape. In 2007, he moved to Ashland, Oregon where he became Studio Director of Blackstone Audio.

Gardner has also narrated under the aliases Tom Parker and Alexander Adams.

== Reviews ==
Gardner was reviewed by journalist John Schwartz in The New York Times, who called him "a wry narrator with a mellow, regular-guy voice" who "is remarkably companionable and conveys the feeling he’s enjoying the book as much as you are, with a smile that is somehow audible." Musician Greg Saunier said Gardner had a "simultaneously smooth and gravelly voice" with "a constantly varying pace and musical inflection". Another critic described his voice as "sandpaper and velvet".

== Awards and honors ==
- 1986 Helen Hayes Awards Resident Acting, Outstanding Lead Actor in a Resident Production, Looking Glass, Woolly Mammoth Theatre Company
- 1986 Helen Hayes Awards Resident Acting, Outstanding Lead Actor in a Resident Production, Metamorphosis, Woolly Mammoth Theatre Company
- 1990 Helen Hayes Awards Resident Acting, Outstanding Supporting Actor in a Resident Production, The Dead Monkey, Woolly Mammoth Theatre Company
- 1991 Helen Hayes Awards Resident Acting, Outstanding Lead Actor in a Resident Musical, The Rocky Horror Show, Woolly Mammoth Theatre Company
- "Best Voices of the Century", AudioFile
- "AudioFile Best of .." for 2003, 2004, 2007, 2009, 2010
- 2005 "Audiobook Narrator of the Year", Publishers Weekly
- 2009 Audie Award, Voice of the Violin

== See also ==
- George Guidall
