= George Guidall =

American audio book narrator and actor

George Guidall (born June 7, 1938) is a prolific American audiobook narrator and theatre actor. As of November 2014, he had recorded over 1,270 audiobooks, which was believed to be the record at the time.

== Biography ==
- Video; George Guidall narrates
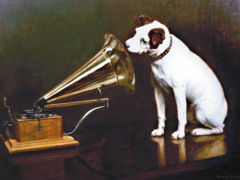
- Tides of War; C-SPAN3, December 2000

Guidall is from New Jersey. His family name is Shapiro; his stage name is Guidall, which is a permutation of his Hebrew name: Gedalyah. Guidall's father was a pharmacist, and his four brothers also went into the medical profession, but Guidall decided to go into theatre instead. He received a master's degree in social work in his 50s, going on to provide counseling during the day while acting at night. He heard about audiobook narration through a fellow actor.

Guidall lives in White Plains, New York and narrates his works in a small basement studio in nearby Irvington, New York. He typically takes 3 to 4 days to complete a book.

His narrations include Thomas Pynchon's Gravity's Rainbow in 1986, and then again in 2014 as a new recording. Guidall said the book took about 1 month working full-time daily and was one of his most difficult works.

Guidall says he reads all his books beforehand and seeks to understand the book, not only to impart information but also emotion and performance. Guidall says many narrators are "just reading out loud. They don't have an emotional underpinning. There's a rhythm to speech in terms of what's implied. If it's raining in the book, there’s got to be something about the voice that evokes the rain." Guidall says audiobook narration "expands the author's intent, brings it into an immediacy. I am the author when I'm doing it. I'm a literary hermit crab finding a home in someone else's imagined truth."

Guidall provides occasional presentations at libraries called "The Art and Artifice of Audiobook Narration".

== Awards and honors ==
- Off-Broadway Theater Award (Obie) for his performance in the Off Broadway play Cinders
- Audie Award for John Irving's A Widow For One Year
- Audie Award for Wally Lamb's I Know This Much Is True
- Audio Publishers Association Special Achievement Award (lifetime achievement).

== See also ==
- Grover Gardner
