= Siobhan Fallon (writer) =

American writer

Siobhan Fallon is an American fiction writer. Her first book, You Know When the Men Are Gone, published in 2011, is a collection of loosely-connected short stories about military wives in Fort Hood, Texas. The Los Angeles Times described it as "compassionate yet unflinching". A short story of hers, "Tips for a Smooth Transition", was published in the collection Fire and Forget.

== Books ==
- You Know When the Men Are Gone (2011, G. P. Putnam's Sons, ISBN 978-1101486146)
- The Confusion of Languages (2017, G P Putnam's Sons, ISBN 978-0399158926)
