= Jess Walter =

American novelist (born 1965)

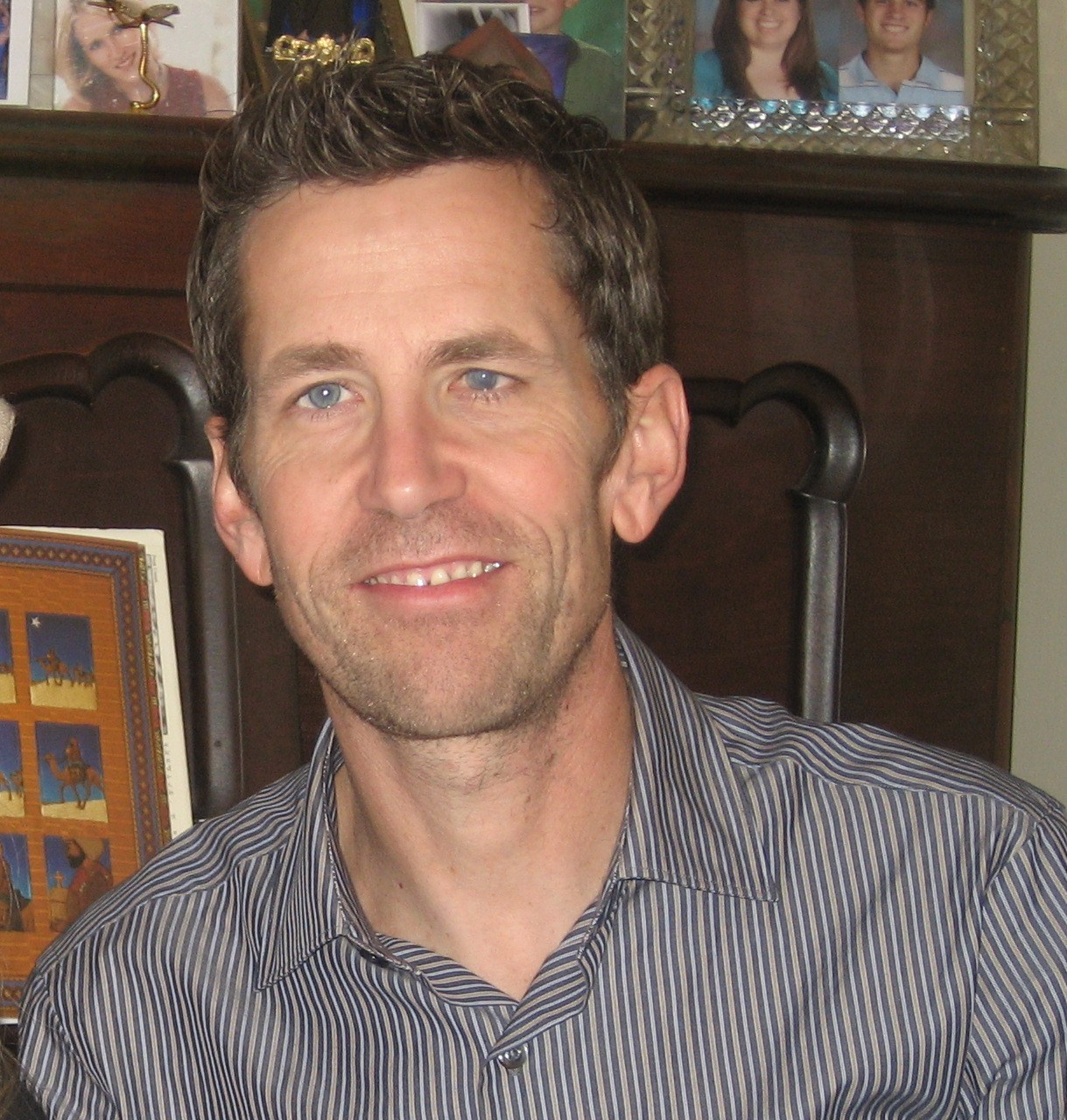
- Walter in 2009
- Born: July 20, 1965 (age 61); Spokane, Washington, U.S.
- Occupation: Author
- Website: www.jesswalter.com

Jess Walter (born July 20, 1965) is an American author of fiction and non-fiction. He has won the Edgar Allan Poe Award, and was a finalist for the National Book Award in 2006.

== Career ==
Walter has published eight novels, Over Tumbled Graves, Land of the Blind, Citizen Vince, The Zero, The Financial Lives of the Poets, Beautiful Ruins, The Cold Millions, and So Far Gone. In 2013, he published his first collection of short stories, We Live in Water, which President Barack Obama named one of his favorite books in 2019. In 2022, he published his second collection of short stories, The Angel of Rome. His essays and short stories have also appeared in Best American Short Stories, Best American Nonrequired Reading, McSweeny's, Esquire, Harper's, Byliner, Playboy, ESPN the Magazine, Details, and other publications. His books have been published in thirty-two languages.

Walter's novel Beautiful Ruins was a number one New York Times best seller. It was also named Esquire's Book of the Year, NPR Fresh Air's Best Novel of 2012, a New York Times Notable Book, and a Washington Post Notable Book. Maureen Corrigan of NPR's Fresh Air called this novel a "literary miracle" and Steve Almond of The Boston Globe described it as "a novel with pathos, piercing wit, and, most important, the generous soul of a literary classic".

Walter's 2009 novel The Financial Lives of the Poets was named one of the best books of the year by Time, The Washington Post, Los Angeles Times, The Believer, NPR's Fresh Air, and several others. Walter also writes screenplays, and has written the screenplay for a possible film adaptation of The Financial Lives of the Poets.

His 2006 novel The Zero was a finalist for the National Book Award. In a 2006 Washington Post book review, John McNally describes The Zero as "a new thriller not only with a conscience but also full of dead-on insights into our culture ... and the often surreal post-9/11 world".

Citizen Vince, Walter's 2005 novel, earned him the Edgar Allan Poe Award for best novel in 2006.

Walter is also a career journalist whose work has appeared in The New York Times, The Washington Post and The Boston Globe. As a reporter he covered the Randy Weaver/Ruby Ridge case for the Spokane Spokesman-Review newspaper and authored a book about the case, Every Knee Shall Bow (revised edition titled Ruby Ridge). He also was the co-author with Christopher Darden of the 1996 bestseller In Contempt.

== Personal life ==
Walter lives with his wife, Anne, and their three children in his childhood hometown of Spokane, Washington. He is an alumnus of East Valley High School and Eastern Washington University.

== Bibliography ==
=== Novels ===
- Over Tumbled Graves (2001)
- The Land of the Blind (2003)
- Citizen Vince (2005)
- The Zero (2006)
- The Financial Lives of the Poets (2009)
- Beautiful Ruins (2012)
- The Cold Millions (2020)
- So Far Gone (2025)

=== Short story collections ===
- We Live in Water: Stories (2013)
- The Angel of Rome: And Other Stories (2022)

=== Non-fiction ===
- Every Knee Shall Bow (1995)
  - re-released as: Ruby Ridge: The Truth and Tragedy of the Randy Weaver Family (Updated & Revised ed.). New York: Harper Perennial. 2002 [1995]. ISBN 9-7800-6000-794-2.
- In Contempt (co-authored with Christopher Darden) (1996)

== Awards ==
2006

- Edgar Allan Poe Award for best novel Citizen Vince
- National Book Award finalist for best novel The Zero
- Finalist for Washington State Book Award in fiction for The Zero

2007

- Finalist for Washington State Book Award in fiction for Citizen Vince
- Pacific Northwest Booksellers Award for The Zero
- LA Times Book Prize for The Zero

2011

- Finalist for Washington State Book Award in fiction for The Financial Lives of the Poets

2012

- New York Times 100 Notable Books of 2012 list for Beautiful Ruins

2021

- Washington State Book Award in fiction for The Cold Millions
