= Audio Publishers Association =

Trade organization for the audiobook industry

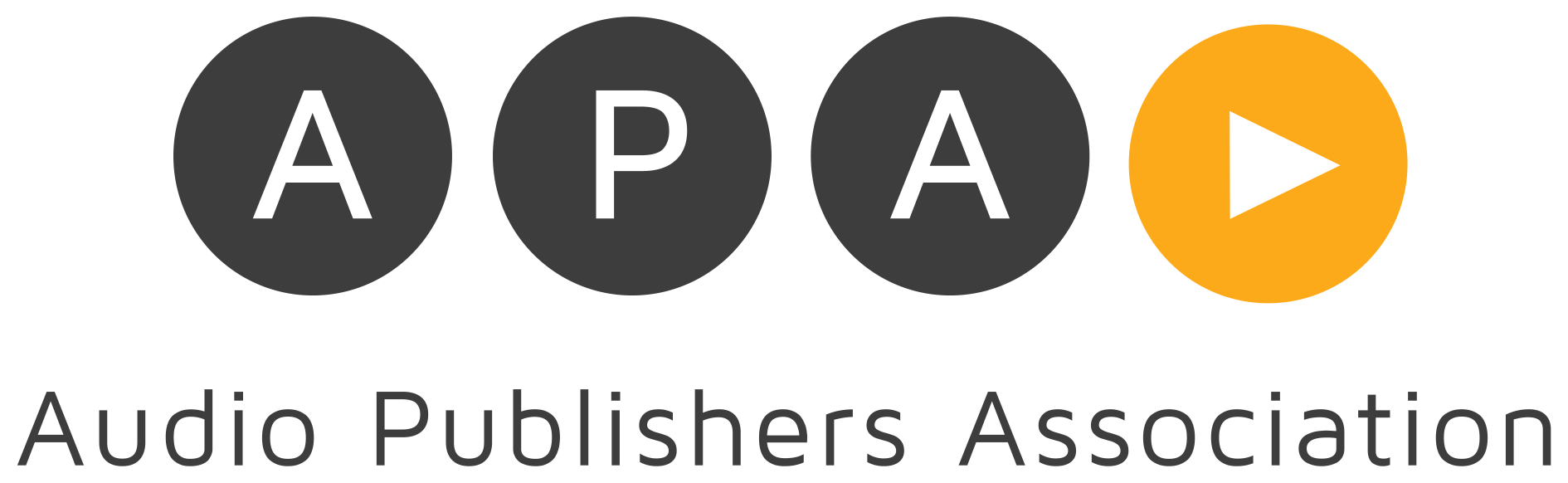
- Formation: May 1986; 39 years ago
- Type: Nonprofit trade association
- Tax ID no.: 13-3614862
- Legal status: 501(c)(6) organization
- Location: New York City, United States
- Field: Audiobook industry
- President: Sean McManus
- Executive director: Jim Dinegar
- Revenue: US$949,090 (2024)
- Expenses: US$875,087 (2024)
- Website: www.audiopub.org

The Audio Publishers Association (APA) is a not-for-profit trade association for the audiobook industry. Founded in the United States in 1986, its stated mission is to "advocate the common, collective business interests of audio publishers." Membership is open to "audio publishing companies and allied suppliers, distributors, and retailers of spoken word products and allied fields related to the production, distribution and sale of audiobooks." Activities include national consumer surveys, gathering of industry statistics, trade-show exhibits, a newsletter and an annual conference.

== History ==
The APA was founded in May 1986, when somewhere between five to nine audiobook publishers joined to form the organization, initially to address the need for industry statistics, such as sales and member numbers. The founders met for the first time in New Orleans at BookExpo America. They included Newman Communications, Warner Bros. Audio, Simon & Schuster, Bantam Doubleday Dell, and Random House. The first APA president was Seth Gershel who was also Simon & Schuster's director of sales.

In 1994, the APA officially established the term "audiobook" as the industry standard. In 1996, APA founded the Audie Awards, which AudioFile magazine called the "Oscars of the audiobook industry". In addition to the awards, other events include an annual Audio Publishers Association Conference (APAC), and an International Summit of Audio Publishers (ISAP).
