= Julie Yip-Williams =

American lawyer (1976–2018)

- Julie Yip-Williams, from a 2013 video.
- Born: Diep Ly Thanh; January 6, 1976; Tam Kỳ, South Vietnam
- Died: March 19, 2018 (aged 42); Brooklyn, New York
- Education: Williams College; Harvard Law School (JD)
- Occupation(s): Lawyer, writer

Julie Yip-Williams (January 6, 1976 – March 19, 2018) was an American lawyer and writer, born Diep Ly Thanh in Vietnam.

== Early life and education ==
Diep Ly Thanh was born in Tam Kỳ, South Vietnam, the daughter of Diep The Phu (Peter Yip) and Lam Que Anh (Ann Yip). She was blind from congenital cataracts, and a grandmother pressured her parents to find an herbalist to end the baby's life. In 1979, she escaped Vietnam with dozens of family members, in a fishing boat. They landed in Hong Kong as refugees, and moved to California by the end of 1979. She was raised in Monterey Park, California. Her vision was improved with surgery in Los Angeles, but she remained legally blind.

Yip earned a bachelor's degree from Williams College in Massachusetts, and a J.D. degree from Harvard Law School.

== Career ==
Yip worked in corporate law in New York City from 2002. In 2013, after being diagnosed with colon cancer, Yip-Williams started a blog, to share her experience with the disease and treatment, and to leave a record of herself for her young daughters. In her last months, she also made recordings for a podcast produced by Eleanor Kagan, titled Julie.

The blog and other writing by Yip-Williams, including a manuscript about her childhood, were compiled into a memoir, The Unwinding of the Miracle: A Memoir of Life, Death, and Everything That Comes After (2019), edited by her friend Mark Warren and published posthumously. The book was frequently compared to Paul Kalanithi's memoir When Breath Becomes Air (2016), and Nina Riggs' The Bright Hour (2017), which both had similar themes. It was included in The New York Times' "100 Notable Books of 2019" annual feature.

== Personal life ==
Julie Yip married fellow lawyer Joshua Williams. They had two daughters, Mia and Isabelle. Yip-Williams died from colon cancer in 2018, aged 42, at her home in Brooklyn.
