= Tam Hòa =

Tam Hòa may refer to several places in Vietnam, including:

- Tam Hòa, Biên Hòa, a ward of Biên Hòa
- Tam Hòa, Núi Thành, a commune of Núi Thành district
