= Kingman High School =

Kingman High School could refer to:

- Kingman High School (Kingman, Arizona), formerly Kingman High School North
- Kingman High School Kingman, Kansas
- Kingman High School, a former high school in Peoria, Illinois, previously known as Averyville High School, and replaced by Woodruff High School (Peoria, Illinois) in 1937
