= Chu Lai Airport =

Commercial airport in Vietnam

Chu Lai Airport Sân bay Chu Lai
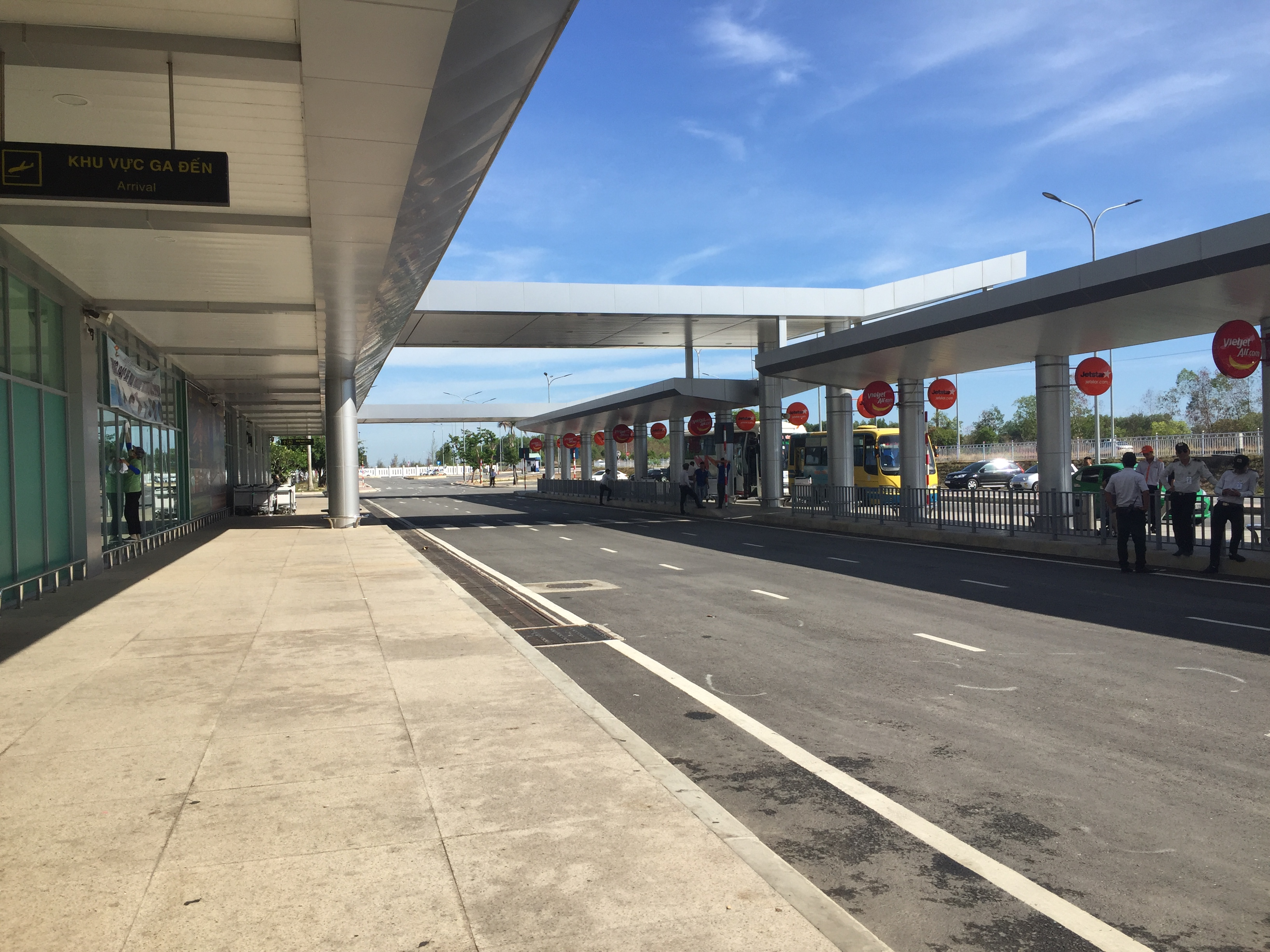
- Chu Lai Airport arrival hall
- IATA: VCL; ICAO: VVCA

Summary
- Airport type: Public
- Operator: Middle Airports Corporation
- Serves: Tam Kỳ and Quảng Ngãi
- Location: Núi Thành, Da Nang, Vietnam
- Opened: 22 March 2005; 21 years ago
- Built: 1 June 1965; 61 years ago
- Coordinates: 15°24′22″N 108°42′20″E
- Website: www.vietnamairport.vn/chulaiairport

Map
- Location of airport in Vietnam

Runways
Direction	Length		Surface
Direction	m	ft	Surface
14/32	3,050	10,000	Concrete

Statistics (2015)
- Passengers: 553,285
- http://vietnamairport.vn/tin-tuc/hoat-dong-acv/acv-hoi-nghi-tong-ket-cong-tac-nam-2016-va-trien-khai-ke-hoach-nam-2017

Chu Lai Airport (IATA: VCL, ICAO: VVCA) is an airport in Núi Thành, Da Nang, Vietnam. It is near Tam Kỳ area, the largest city in former Quảng Nam province. The airport is located in the Chu Lai Open Economic Zone, Núi Thành commune.

The airfield was originally established in the Vietnam War, as Chu Lai Air Base, by the United States Marines. The airport was nearly abandoned after the fall of Saigon, and only used irregularly for military flights. On 22 March 2004, the construction of the terminal began and on 22 March 2005, the first commercial flight from Ho Chi Minh City's Tan Son Nhat International Airport landed here.

As of 2008, Chu Lai Airport is the largest airfield in Vietnam in terms of area, covering 30 km^{2}. The runway is 3050 m long.

To facilitate the travel arrangement to two major towns in the neighborhoods, free shuttle bus services are provided from and to the airport for Tam Kỳ area and Quảng Ngãi area.

== Renovation ==
The government of Vietnam has approved an investment plan for this airport. According to this plan, Chu Lai airport will receive nearly VND 11,470 billion (nearly $700 million) in investment for enlarging its capacity to 25 landing places by 2015 and 46 by 2025. The project will include renovation and new infrastructure, including two runways, 3,800m and 4,000m long, and 60 meters wide each, six parking lots and two transit stations. By 2010, existing runways and parking lots will be upgraded. The airport will also receive a new signal light system and control station for medium-sized aircraft, such as Boeing 767s and Airbus A320s. Vietnamese officials hope the airport will be able to handle 4 million passengers by completion in 2025. The airport is projected to become an air cargo transport hub, with 5 million metric tons of cargo per year.

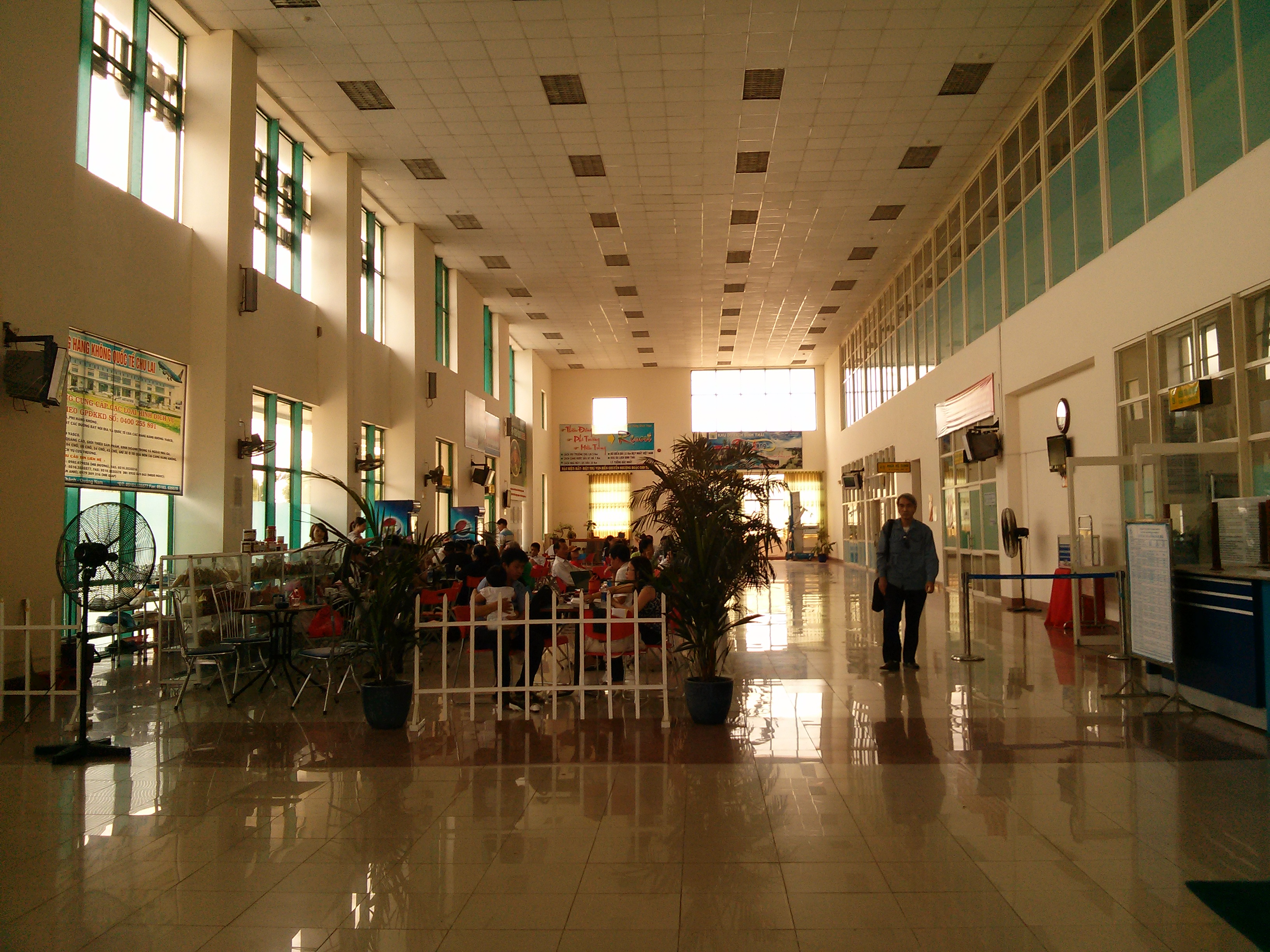
inside the terminal

In November 2015, a collaboration between Vietnam and New Zealand governments has initiated a project to establish a pilot training school in the Chu Lai Airport. This is projected to train 300 pilots a year in 2020.

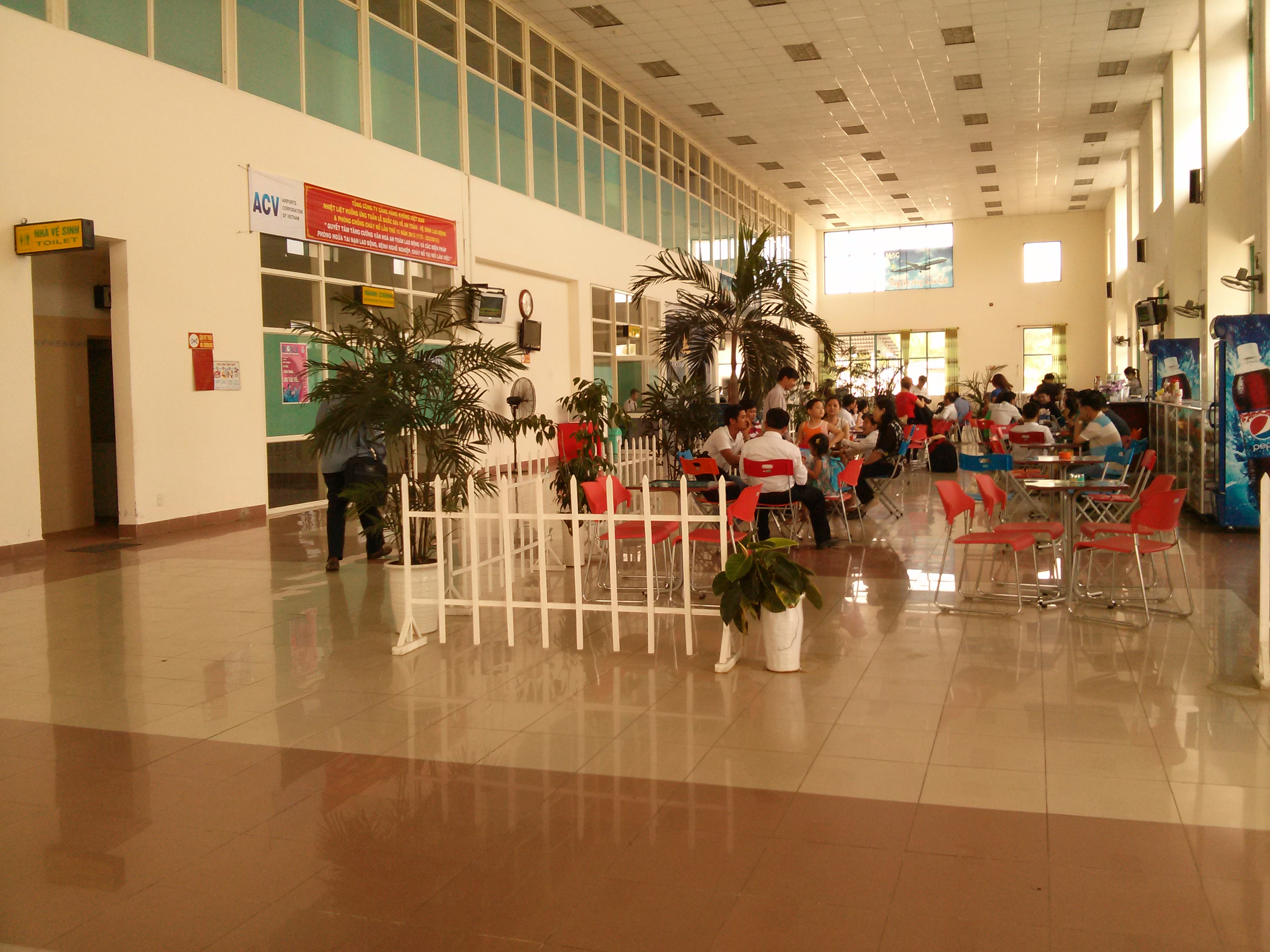
inside the terminal

== Airlines and destinations ==
Airlines	Destinations
Pacific Airlines	Ho Chi Minh City
VietJet Air	Hanoi, Ho Chi Minh City
Vietnam Airlines	Hanoi, Ho Chi Minh City

The nearest international airport is Da Nang International Airport which is located 111 km (69 mi) north west of Chu Lai Airport. The airport provides most domestic and international destinations.
