= Tam Kỳ (city) =

- Provincial city (Class-2)
- Tam Kỳ City; Thành phố Tam Kỳ
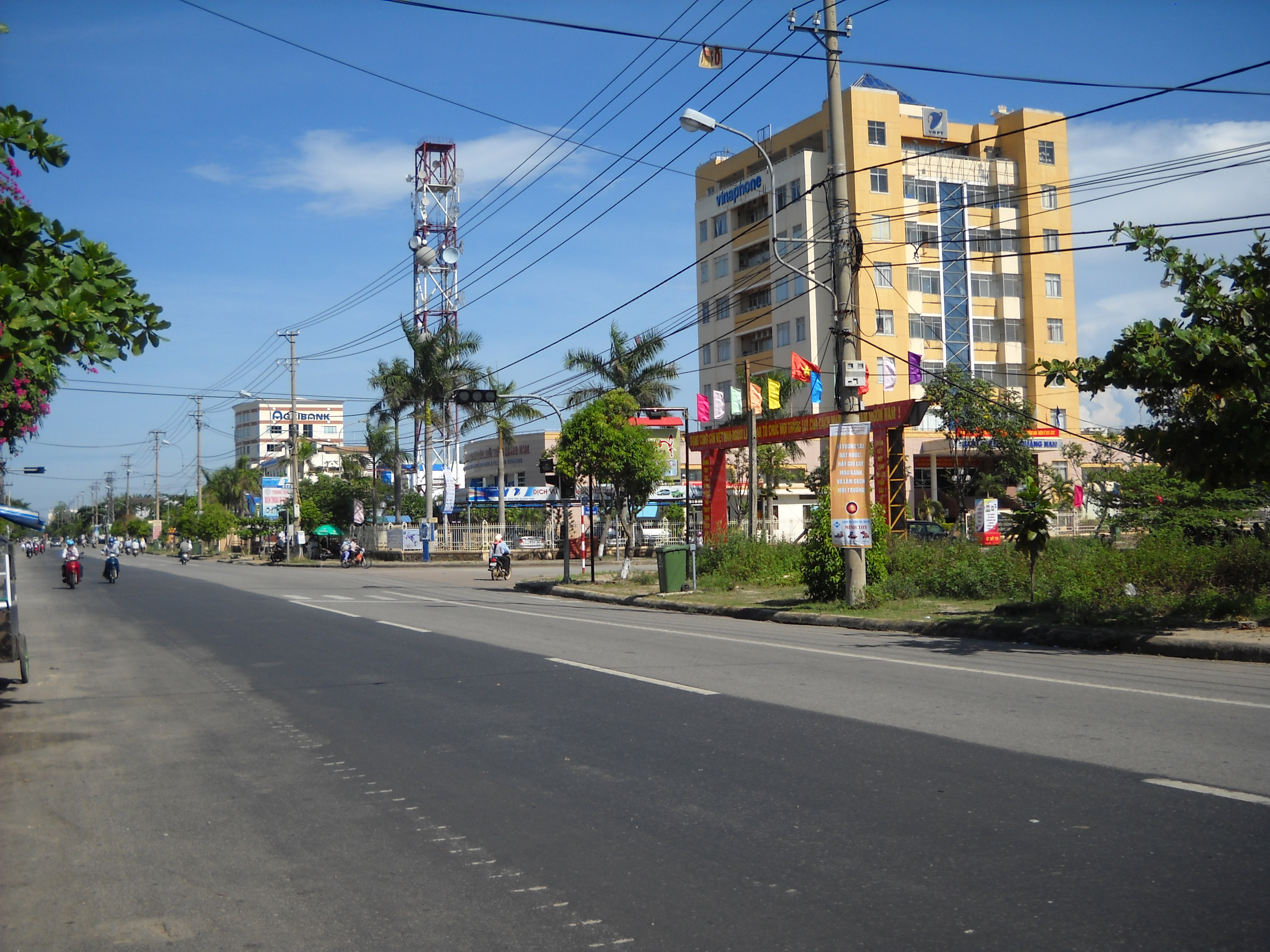

- Location of in Vietnam Tam Kỳ (Southeast Asia) Tam Kỳ (Asia)
- Coordinates: 15°34′N 108°29′E
- Country: Vietnam
- Founded: December 3, 1983: Tam Kỳ town was established; September 29, 2006: established Tam Kỳ city

Government
  - Chairman of the People's Committee: Bùi Ngọc Ảnh
  - Chairman of the People's Council: Nguyễn Hồng Quang
  - Chairman of the Fatherland Front: Phạm Hoàng Đức

Area
  - Provincial city (Class-2): 100.26 km^{2} (38.71 sq mi)

Population (2019 census)
  - Provincial city (Class-2): 122,374
  - Density: 1,220.6/km^{2} (3,161.3/sq mi)
  - Urban: 91,450 people (75%)
- Time zone: UTC+7 (Indochina Time)
- Climate: Am
- Website: tamky.quangnam.gov.vn

Tam Kỳ (IATA: TMK) was the capital city of Quảng Nam Province, in the South Central Coast of Vietnam, now merged with Da Nang. As of 2019, the city had a population of 122,374.

== History ==
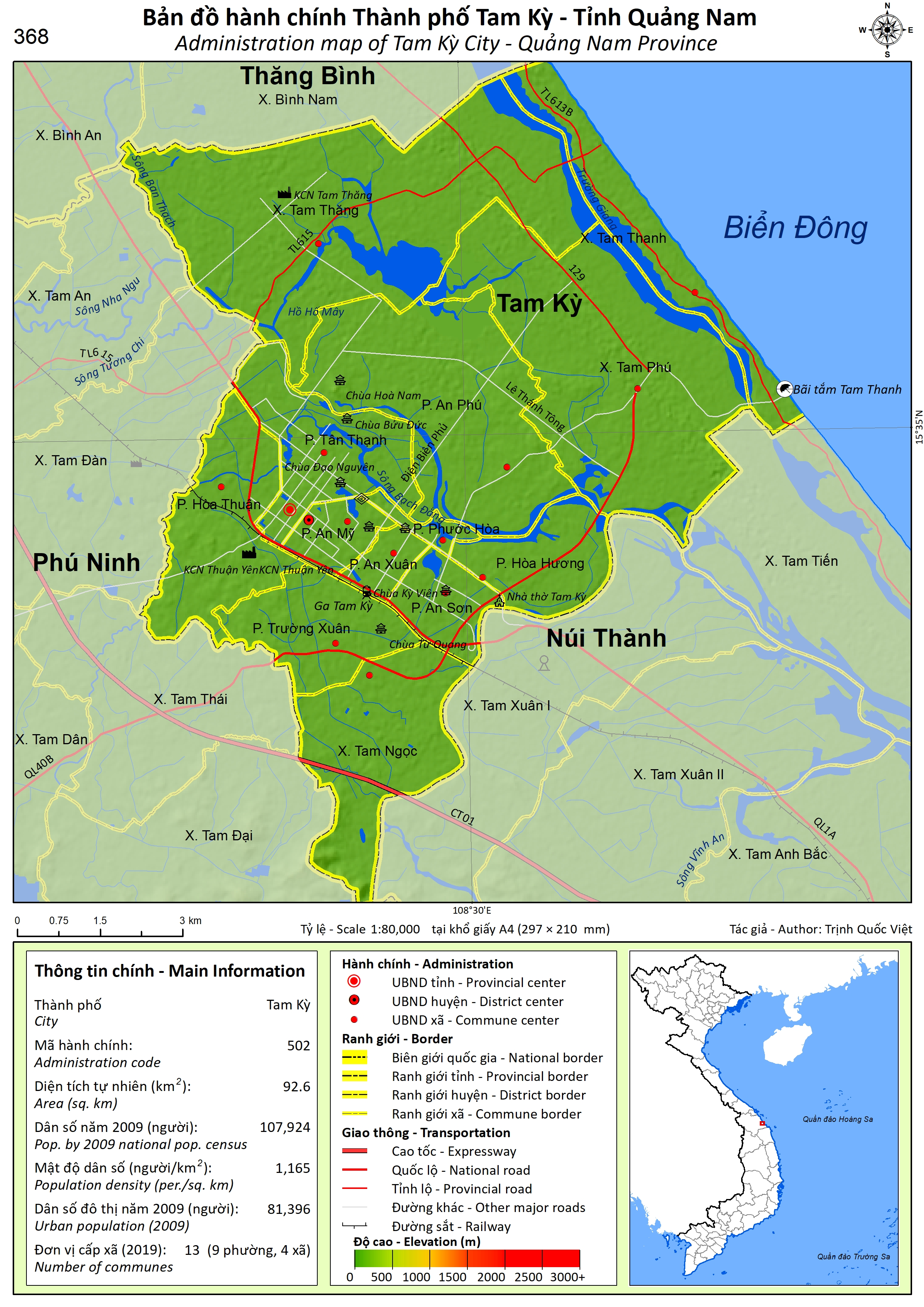
Administration map of Tam Kỳ

The town was established in 1906 under the Nguyễn dynasty as an administrative and tax post. During the Republic of Vietnam, the city was the main base of the US military in Quảng Nam Province (what was then Quảng Tín Province) for the war in Vietnam. The North Vietnamese captured the city on March 24, 1975.

In 1997, the local government under the Socialist Republic of Vietnam made it the capital of Quảng Nam province.

Since then, there has been substantial development within the city. Tam Kỳ city is famous for Tam Kỳ chicken rice, which is recognized nationally, and many pristine beaches. In addition, Tam Kỳ city is also famous for Tam Kỳ noodles, which is known as My Quang.

== Climate ==
Tam Kỳ has a typical Central Coast tropical monsoon climate (Köppen Am) not far from being classified as a trade-wind tropical rainforest climate (Af) as the dry season from February to April still averages about 52 millimetres or 2.0 inches per month.

Climate data for Tam Kỳ
Month	Jan	Feb	Mar	Apr	May	Jun	Jul	Aug	Sep	Oct	Nov	Dec	Year
Record high °C (°F)	32.6 (90.7)	35.9 (96.6)	37.0 (98.6)	40.8 (105.4)	41.0 (105.8)	40.2 (104.4)	41.0 (105.8)	41.0 (105.8)	38.7 (101.7)	35.0 (95.0)	32.4 (90.3)	30.7 (87.3)	41.0 (105.8)
Mean daily maximum °C (°F)	24.7 (76.5)	26.4 (79.5)	28.9 (84.0)	31.7 (89.1)	33.5 (92.3)	34.4 (93.9)	34.2 (93.6)	33.9 (93.0)	31.6 (88.9)	29.0 (84.2)	27.0 (80.6)	24.6 (76.3)	30.0 (86.0)
Daily mean °C (°F)	21.5 (70.7)	22.5 (72.5)	24.4 (75.9)	26.8 (80.2)	28.3 (82.9)	29.1 (84.4)	28.9 (84.0)	28.6 (83.5)	27.3 (81.1)	25.6 (78.1)	24.1 (75.4)	21.9 (71.4)	25.7 (78.3)
Mean daily minimum °C (°F)	19.4 (66.9)	20.2 (68.4)	21.6 (70.9)	23.7 (74.7)	24.9 (76.8)	25.5 (77.9)	25.3 (77.5)	25.2 (77.4)	24.4 (75.9)	23.4 (74.1)	22.1 (71.8)	20.1 (68.2)	23.0 (73.4)
Record low °C (°F)	12.3 (54.1)	14.4 (57.9)	14.2 (57.6)	18.2 (64.8)	20.6 (69.1)	22.4 (72.3)	21.3 (70.3)	19.8 (67.6)	20.6 (69.1)	17.6 (63.7)	14.8 (58.6)	12.0 (53.6)	12.0 (53.6)
Average rainfall mm (inches)	127.9 (5.04)	48.7 (1.92)	52.6 (2.07)	54.1 (2.13)	96.5 (3.80)	97.9 (3.85)	88.9 (3.50)	131.0 (5.16)	336.4 (13.24)	704.1 (27.72)	622.6 (24.51)	388.1 (15.28)	2,748.8 (108.22)
Average rainy days	15.5	7.8	6.1	5.8	9.4	8.0	8.2	10.7	15.2	20.7	21.6	21.4	150.4
Average relative humidity (%)	88.6	87.7	85.9	83.4	80.2	78.1	77.9	79.0	84.4	87.5	88.8	89.6	84.3
Mean monthly sunshine hours	116.0	142.6	192.7	215.7	248.2	236.2	234.5	220.6	184.7	145.8	105.7	75.8	2,128
Source: Vietnam Institute for Building Science and Technology

== Transportation ==
The city is served by Tam Kỳ Railway Station, which is connected to all major cities across Vietnam. Da Nang International Airport is 70 km from the city, which is a one and a half hours' drive. The closer Chu Lai International Airport is 30 km away. There is a free daily shuttle bus between the airport and Quảng Ngãi city center. Other means of transportation include regular car and bus services.

== Notable people ==
- Julie Yip-Williams (1976-2018), American lawyer, memoirist, born in Tam Kỳ.

== Gallery ==
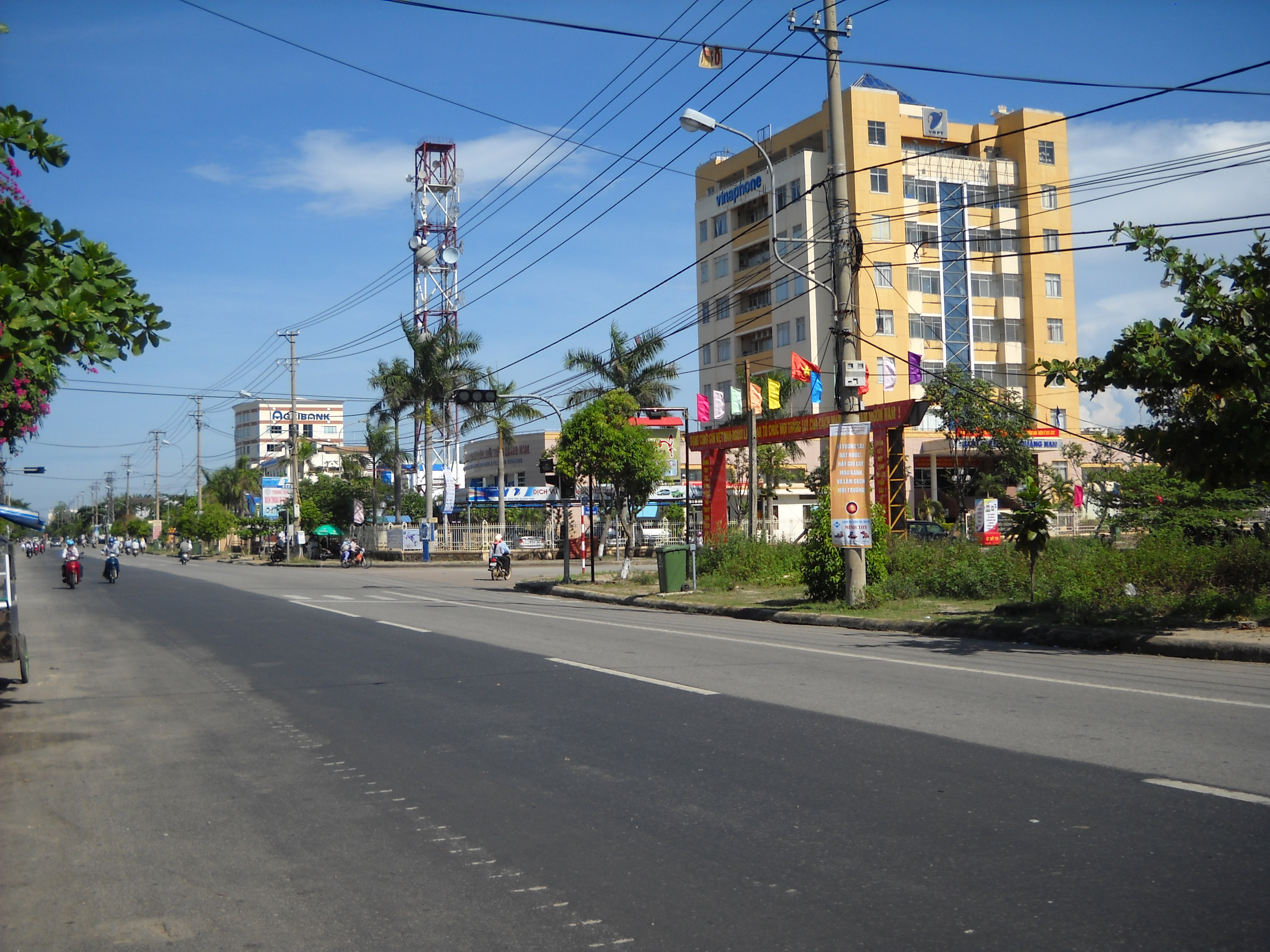
Streets in Tam Kỳ, Quảng Nam

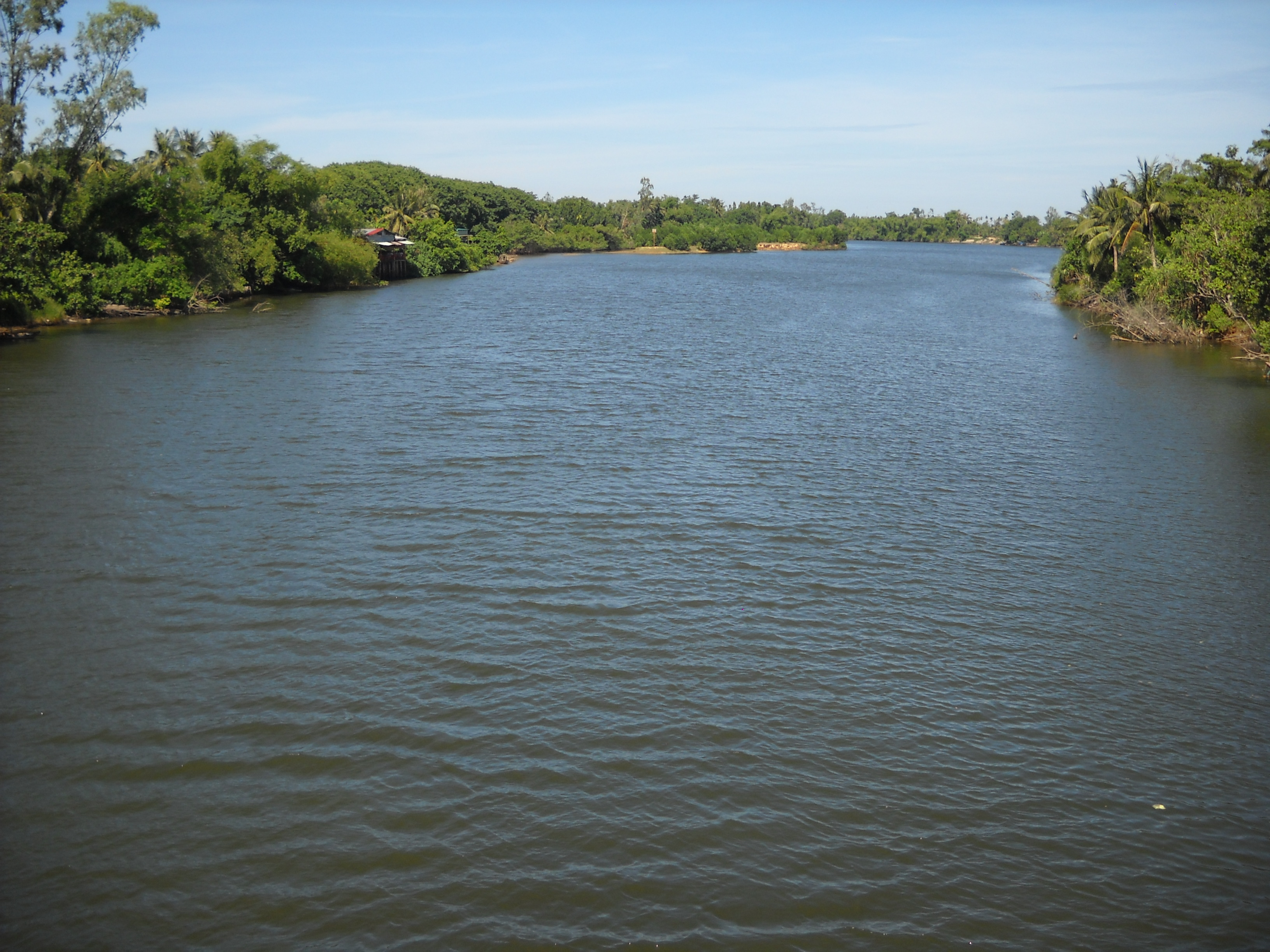
Tam Kỳ River, Quảng Nam

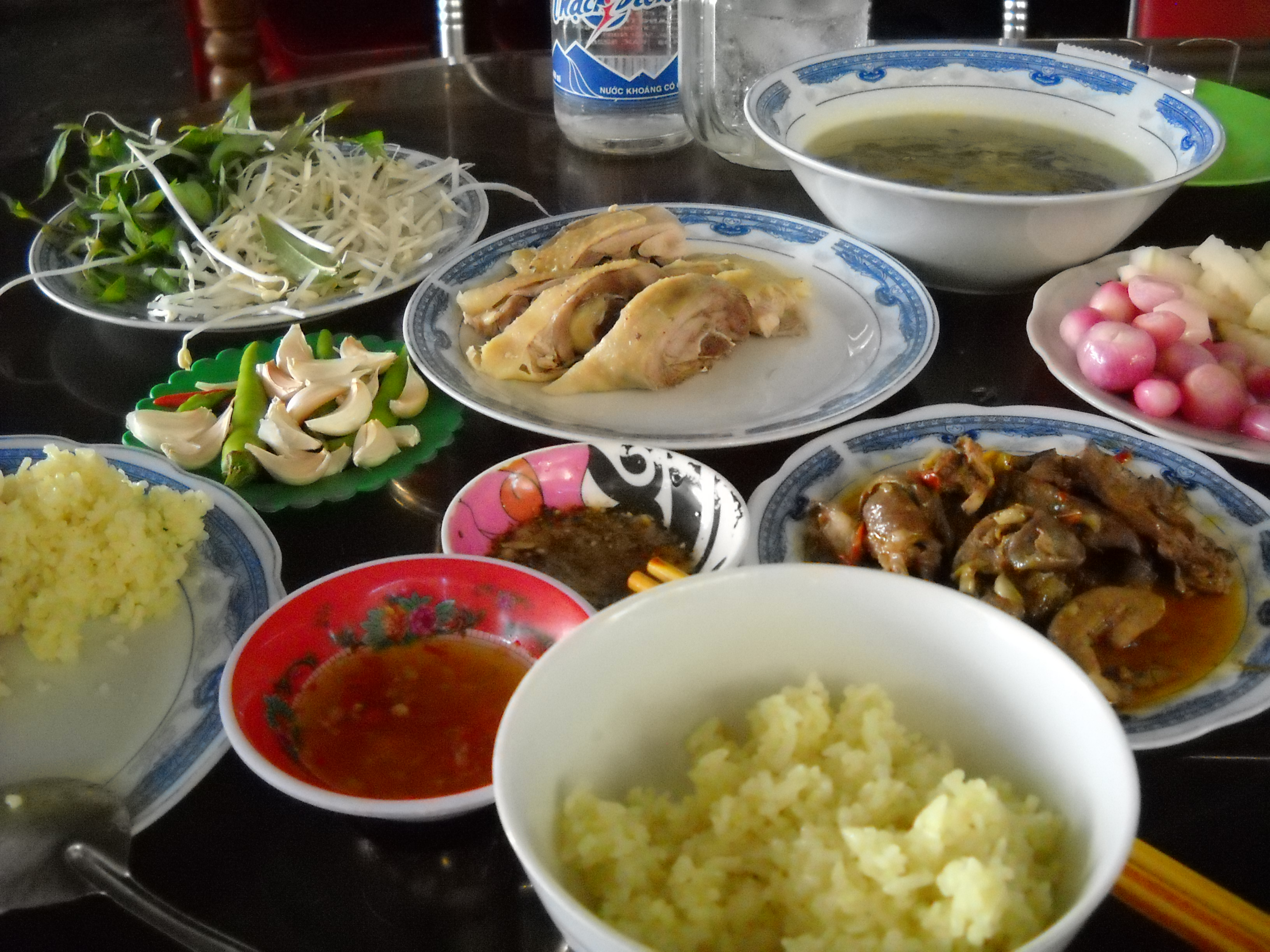
Cơm gà Tam Kỳ, Tam Ky chicken rice
