= Kingman High School (Kingman, Arizona) =

Coordinates: 35°14′41″N 114°00′34″W

Location
- 4182 Bank Street; Kingman, Arizona 86409; United States

Information
- School type: Public high school
- Established: 1917 (109 years ago)
- School district: Kingman Unified School District
- CEEB code: 030180
- Principal: Isaiah Ward
- Teaching staff: 39.41 (FTE)
- Grades: 9-12
- Enrollment: 919 (2023–2024)
- Student to teacher ratio: 23.32
- Colors: Blue and gold
- Athletics conference: AIA 5A
- Mascot: Bulldog
- Website: khs.kusd.org

Kingman High School is a public high school in Kingman, Arizona. It is a part of the Kingman Unified School District. The mascot of Kingman High School is an English bulldog.

== History ==
Kingman High School's history dates back to the beginning of Mohave County, Arizona. When the original school was built in 1917, it was named Mohave County Union High School or Mohave Union High School. In later years it became known as Kingman High School.

In 1936, a gymnasium was built on the Kingman High School campus. The WPA-funded project included a lamella roof, rare for Arizona and unique to Kingman. It was listed on the National Register of Historic Places in 1986.

By 1990 the campus became overcrowded due to the growth of residents who came to the area to work in the casino industry. In 1993 a new high school outside of the Kingman city limits was built, known as Kingman High School North; it was the campus for the sophomores, juniors, and seniors. Freshmen attended the old school, Kingman High South.

In 2006, all high school students began to attend the North campus (by now known as simply Kingman High School). The campus was reused as a middle school (White Cliffs) and is currently Lee Williams High School (9th and 10th grade only for 2013–2014). The historic gymnasium remains on the old campus and was not affected by the conversion.

== Student body ==
As of 1990, the school's students came from Kingman, Dolan Springs, Golden Valley, Peach Springs, and Wikieup.

== Courses ==
The school has some 500 students in AP, honors, or dual enrollment (through Mohave Community College) courses.

== Notable alumni ==
- Paul Kalanithi (1977–2015), neurosurgeon and author of When Breath Becomes Air
