= Lee Williams High School =

Location
- 400 Grandview Avenue; Kingman, Arizona 86401; United States; 35°11′30.31″N 114°3′34.96″W

Information
- School type: Public high school
- Established: 2012 (14 years ago)
- School district: Kingman Unified School District
- CEEB code: 030672
- Teaching staff: 36.71 (FTE)
- Grades: 9-12
- Enrollment: 1,083 (2023–2024)
- Student to teacher ratio: 29.50
- Colors: Red, black and white
- Mascot: Volunteer
- Website: lwhs.kusd.org

Lee Williams High School is the second comprehensive high school in the town of Kingman, Arizona, operated by the Kingman Unified School District. It opened on August 9, 2012, a year later than originally planned.

It is named for Richard Lee Williams, a former school principal and firefighter who died while fighting the Doxol disaster in 1973. The school mascot is the Volunteers.

== History ==
In 1917, Mohave County Union High School opened at this site, later known as Kingman High School. In 1993, a new Kingman High School North campus was opened for sophomores, juniors, and seniors. Freshmen attended the old ("South") school. As the population of Kingman continued to grow, Kingman North became the permanent high school while Kingman South was converted to White Cliffs Middle School. Kingman High School, a campus built for 1,600 students, ultimately housed 2,059 students. This overcrowding necessitated a second high school.

=== Construction ===
At the start of February 2010, workers began to gut the old White Cliffs, with the middle school being moved to a new campus. A $22 million, 17-month project thus began to convert, remodel, and update White Cliffs into a new, second comprehensive high school for Kingman. The main White Cliffs campus, or "Building A", was stripped of its wiring, plumbing, and wall panels. The cafeteria was demolished and replaced with a new one, and a new campus quad was installed. The gymnasium, which is listed on the National Register of Historic Places, remains, but was complemented with a new auxiliary gym. Asbestos removal (the only piece of the project not done by a local contractor) was also performed.

Another component of the remodel was the refurbishing of an old auto shop for career/technical education use, including metalworking and other arts classes. The renovation preserved some elements of the past, such as the "Mohave County Union High School 1917" monument sign, as well as the aforementioned gym.

Part of the football field and one section of bleachers are located on the site of the old Pioneer Cemetery. Some of the graves were relocated in 1944, but due to the cost of re-interment, a number of unclaimed bodies remain. During construction of the high school, workers digging a trench behind the bleachers unearthed seven coffins along with personal items such as cuff links and jewelry. A memorial stone honors the 350 settlers who were buried in Pioneer Cemetery.

Construction was expected to finish by July 1, 2011. However, the district did not get possession of the site until October 3 because of Americans with Disabilities Act compliance issues.

=== Delayed opening ===
As Arizona's budget situation worsened, concern over whether Kingman Unified School District had the funds to operate Lee Williams emerged. The decision was pushed back to March 2011; at that time, following a 3–2 vote, the district voted not to open the school for the 2011–12 school year. Worries included additional budget cuts to the school district.

An open house of the site was held in October 2011.

=== Opening ===
On February 21, 2012, the Kingman Unified School District governing board voted in a 3-2 decision, despite continuing concerns over finances, to open Lee Williams High School to freshmen. It will cost $80,000,000/year to operate Lee Williams High School.

Immediate enrollment projections from the Kingman Unified School District see the school with 1,010 students in the 3A Conference. It is expected that both schools will eventually have an equal enrollment over time.
