= Ashley C. Ford =

American writer

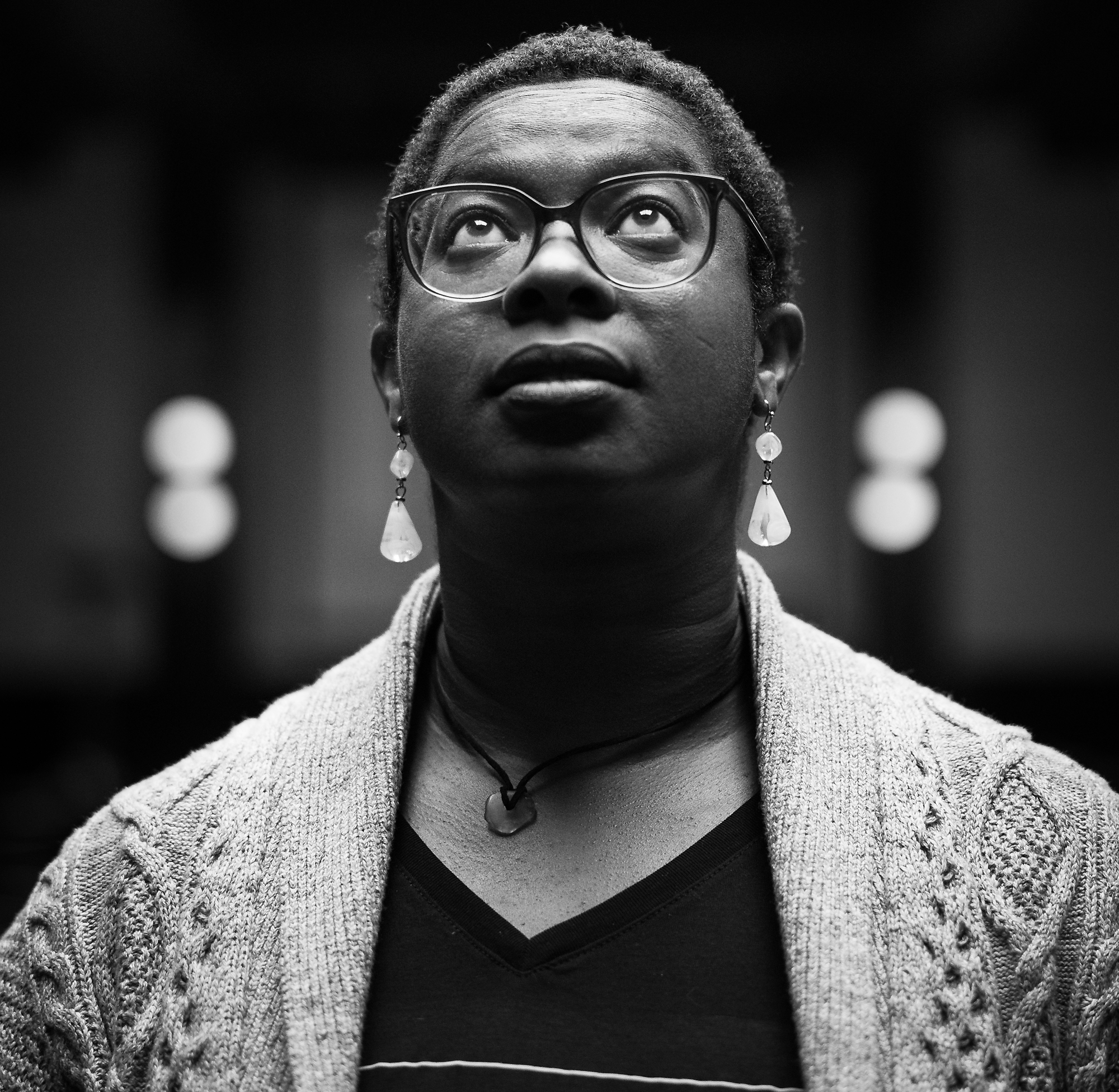
- Ford in March 2018
- Born: January 1987 (age 39); Fort Wayne, Indiana
- Education: Ball State University
- Occupations: Writer, podcaster, educator
- Spouse: Kelly Stacy
- Writing career
- Genre: Non-fiction
- Notable work: Somebody's Daughter
- Website: ashleycford.net

Ashley C. Ford is an American writer, podcaster and educator who discusses topics including race, sexuality, and body image. She is the author of the New York Times best-selling memoir, Somebody's Daughter. She has been the host of five podcasts and has written or guest-edited for publications including The Guardian, Elle, BuzzFeed, and New York. In 2017, Forbes named her one of their "30 Under 30 in Media". In 2022, Ford won the Indiana Authors Award for a debut.

== Early life and education ==
Ford is a native of Fort Wayne, Indiana, where she was raised by her mother and grandmother. Her early life was shaped by significant transitions and challenges. At around four years old, she moved to Columbia, Missouri, to live with her grandmother while her mother struggled in Fort Wayne, Indiana. This period marked the beginning of her love for storytelling, as her grandmother taught her to read using a mix of the Bible and celebrity tabloids, igniting Ford's imagination and creativity. Despite the complexities of her family dynamics, including a father in prison since her infancy, Ford's upbringing fostered a sense of resilience and a deep connection to storytelling that would later define her career. Ford graduated in 2011 with a degree in English from Ball State University in Muncie, Indiana.

== Career ==
=== Writing ===
Ford has written for publications including The Guardian, Elle, BuzzFeed, and Slate as well as lifestyle blog A Cup of Jo. In 2017, she was the senior features writer at Refinery29, and that year, she was named as one of Forbes's "30 Under 30 in Media".

Much of her writing covers personal topics, including her life as a Black, queer writer; her history as a survivor of sexual assault; and her experiences with a family member in prison for most of her childhood. Ford's essay "My Father Spent 30 Years in Prison. Now He's Out." was named on Longreads' Best of 2017 list. She considers the writer Roxane Gay a mentor.

She was announced as a Time100 Talks correspondent in August 2020.

==== Somebody's Daughter ====
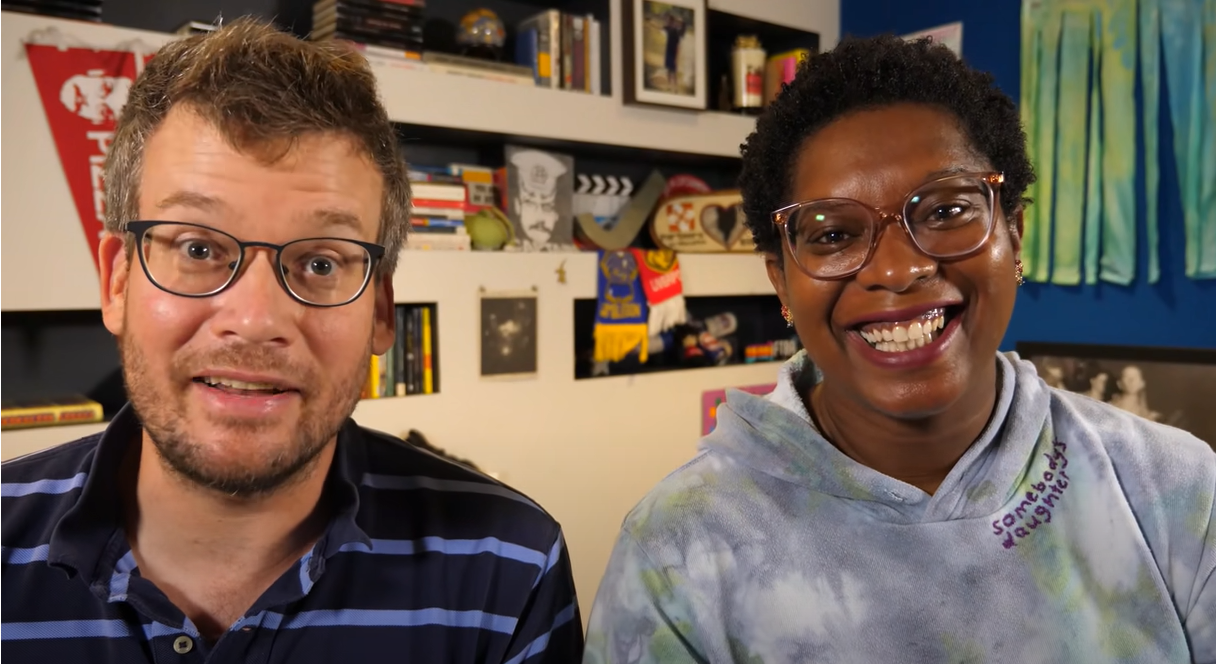
Ford with fellow author John Green in a Vlogbrothers video in June 2021

Her debut book Somebody's Daughter was released on June 1, 2021, as "An Oprah Book" through Oprah Winfrey's publishing imprint at Flatiron Books. The book is a memoir, focusing on her difficult upbringing and her often fraught relationships with her parents, in particular her mother. Throughout her childhood, her father was incarcerated and the book explores the ways the formative conditions that created for her and her mother have "shaped her understanding of childhood, authority, forgiveness and freedom."

=== Podcasting ===
Ford is the host of Brooklyn-based television program and podcast 112BK, has hosted the BuzzFeed News podcast Profile, and was previously the host of the first season of Audible.com's interview series Authorized.

Ford is the host of the short fiction podcast, The Chronicles of Now, co-hosts the HBO companion podcast Lovecraft Country Radio, and is the former host of Mastercard's Fortune Favors the Bold.

=== Acting ===
In 2018, Ford played the narrator in a stage production of The Nightmare Before Christmas at the New York cabaret Feinstein's/54 Below.

== Activism ==
Ford has used social media to drive fundraising campaigns for charitable causes, being credited for helping to raise $450,000 for the Ferguson Municipal Public Library in Ferguson, Missouri, in 2014 and over $100,000 to pay off school lunch debts in 2017.

== Personal life ==
Ford is married to the writer Kelly Stacy. They have a chocolate Labrador named Astro Renegade Ford-Stacy. Ford identifies as queer and credits her time at Ball State as one of the places she was able to explore her sexuality.
