= Cup of Jo =

New York-based fashion, lifestyle, design and parenting blog

- Website type: Blog
- Available in: English
- Founded: 2007
- Creator: Joanna Goddard
- Website: cupofjo.com

Cup of Jo is a New York-based lifestyle, fashion, design, and parenting blog by Joanna Goddard. Goddard began the site in 2007 and it now includes contributing writers and editors Jenny Rosenstrach, Jannelle Sanchez, Thao Thai, Alex Ronan, Christine Pride and Catherine Newman, and formerly, Ashley C. Ford, Caroline Donofrio, Erica Chidi, Kim Rhodes, and Stella Blackmon. Goddard has written for Bene, Glamour, New York Magazine, The New York Times, and Elle; In 2011, Refinery 29 dubbed Goddard "Queen of the Blogosphere".

== History ==
Cup of Jo was founded in 2007 by Joanna Goddard, who started the blog as a weekend hobby. When Goddard first started blogging she shared fun things she found online and wrote short "off-the-cuff" posts. Now, Goddard describes Cup of Jo as an online magazine with long-form essays, house tours, beauty tutorials, career interviews, and discussions on larger issues. The blog has grown to cover fashion, beauty, design, food, travel, relationships, motherhood and lifestyle, and currently receives 5.5 million monthly page views and approximately 1 million monthly unique visitors. Goddard earns money by selling advertisements and collaborating with brands including J.Crew, Outdoor Voices and Nordstrom.

== Joanna Goddard ==
Goddard was born in Paris in 1979 along with her twin sister, Lucy Kalanithi, widow of neurosurgeon and author Paul Kalanithi. Goddard grew up in France, England, and Michigan before graduating from the University of Michigan in 2001. Following her graduation, Goddard moved to New York City and worked at Cosmopolitan before launching the magazine Bene, which she ran from 2005 to 2007. After leaving Bene, Goddard wrote for a number of notable publications including Glamour, Elle, New York Magazine, and Cookie and started her blog, Cup of Jo, as a weekend hobby. She married New York Times reporter Alex Williams on August 29, 2009. The couple's first son, Toby, was born in 2010, and their second son, Anton, was born in 2013. Goddard announced on her blog in February 2023 that she and Williams were ending their marriage. She and her family currently live in Brooklyn, New York.

== Notable interviews ==
In 2015 and 2016, Cup of Jo featured interviews with Lucy Kalanithi, twin sister of Goddard and widow of Paul Kalanithi, author of When Breath Becomes Air. Goddard has also conducted interviews on her blog with Nancy Meyers and Lena Dunham.
