= Núi Thành district =

Coordinates: 15.417°N 108.583°E

Núi Thành district Huyện Núi Thành
- District
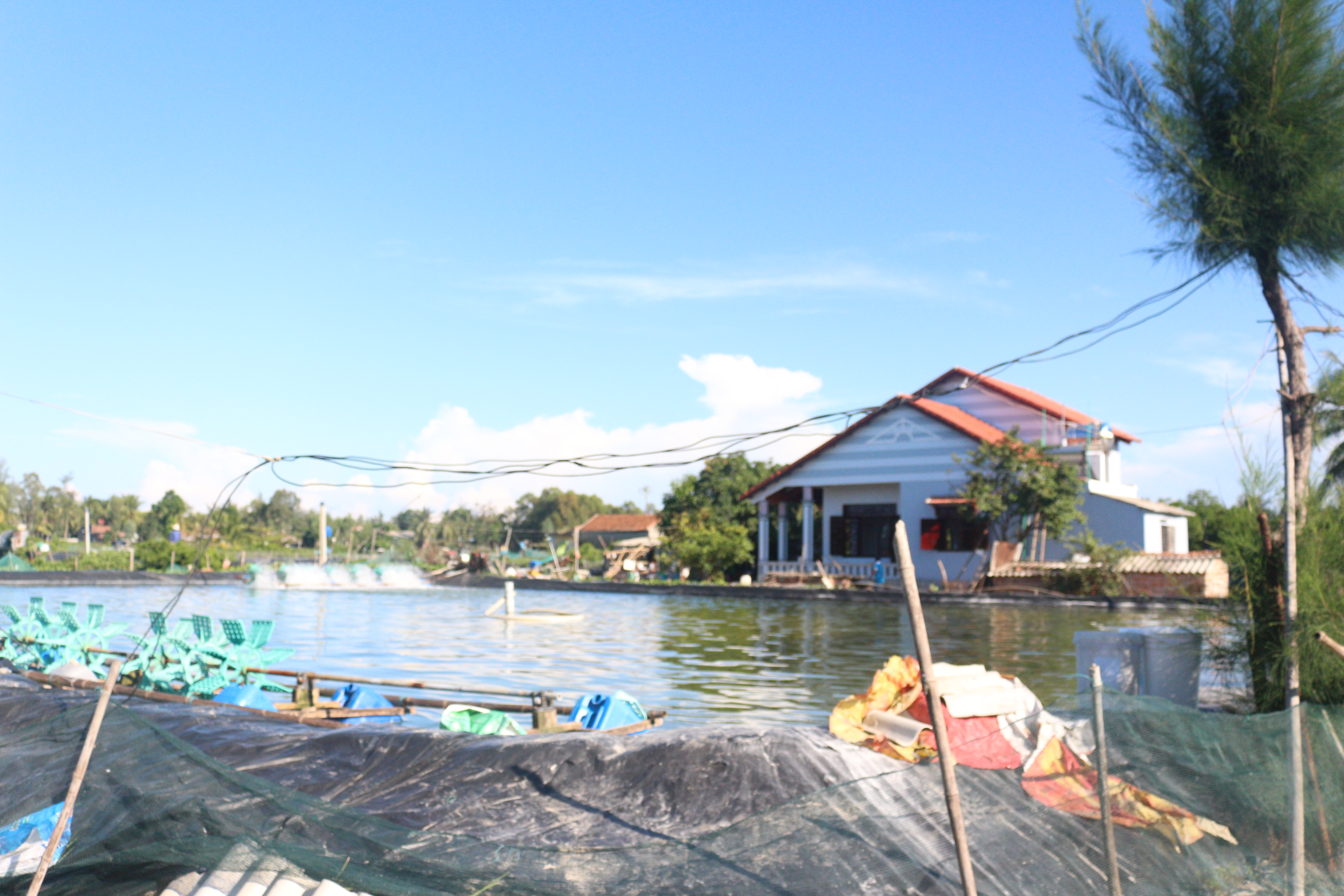

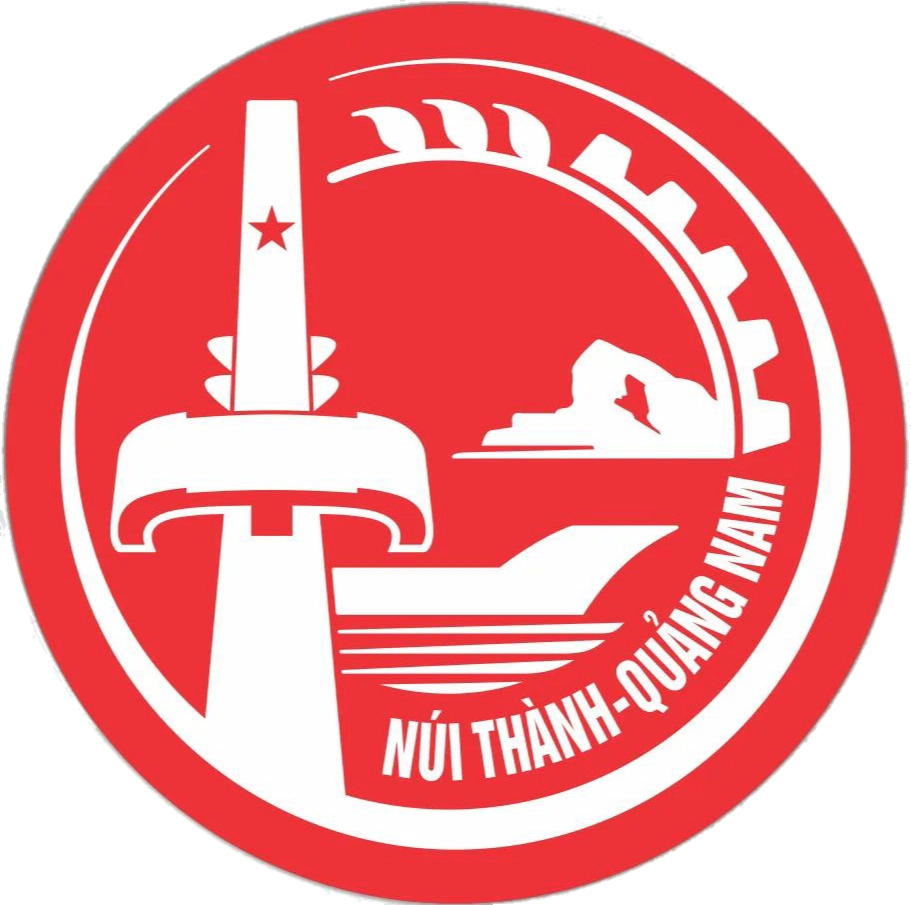
- Seal
- Country: Vietnam
- Region: South Central Coast
- Province: Quảng Nam province
- Founded: December 3, 1983
- Capital: Núi Thành Town

Government
  - Chairman of the People's Committee: Lê Văn Sinh
  - Chairman of the People's Council: Nguyễn Tri Ấn
  - Secretary: Nguyễn Tri Ấn

Area
  - Total: 214.65 sq mi (555.95 km^{2})

Population (2003)
  - Total: 162,050
  - Density: 750/sq mi (288/km^{2})
  - Ethnicities: Kinh; Cor
- Time zone: UTC+7 (Indochina Time)
- Website: nuithanh.quangnam.gov.vn

Núi Thành is a district (huyện) of Quảng Nam province in the South Central Coast region of Vietnam. As of 2003 the district had a population of 142,020. The district covers an area of 533 km^{2}. The district capital lies at Núi Thành.

Núi Thành district has the biggest gas warehouse of central Vietnam, Total Gas & Power Co. Ltd's Kỳ Hà gas warehouse, near Kỳ Hà Fishing Port (it was previously a military air base, see also List of United States Marine Corps installations#Vietnam). A THACO-Kia automobile plant is also located in the district.

Núi Thành is also the home of Chu Lai Airport which was renovated from the abandoned Chu Lai Air Base from the Vietnam War. As of 2015, the airport provides direct daily flights to Hanoi and Ho Chi Minh City.

== History ==
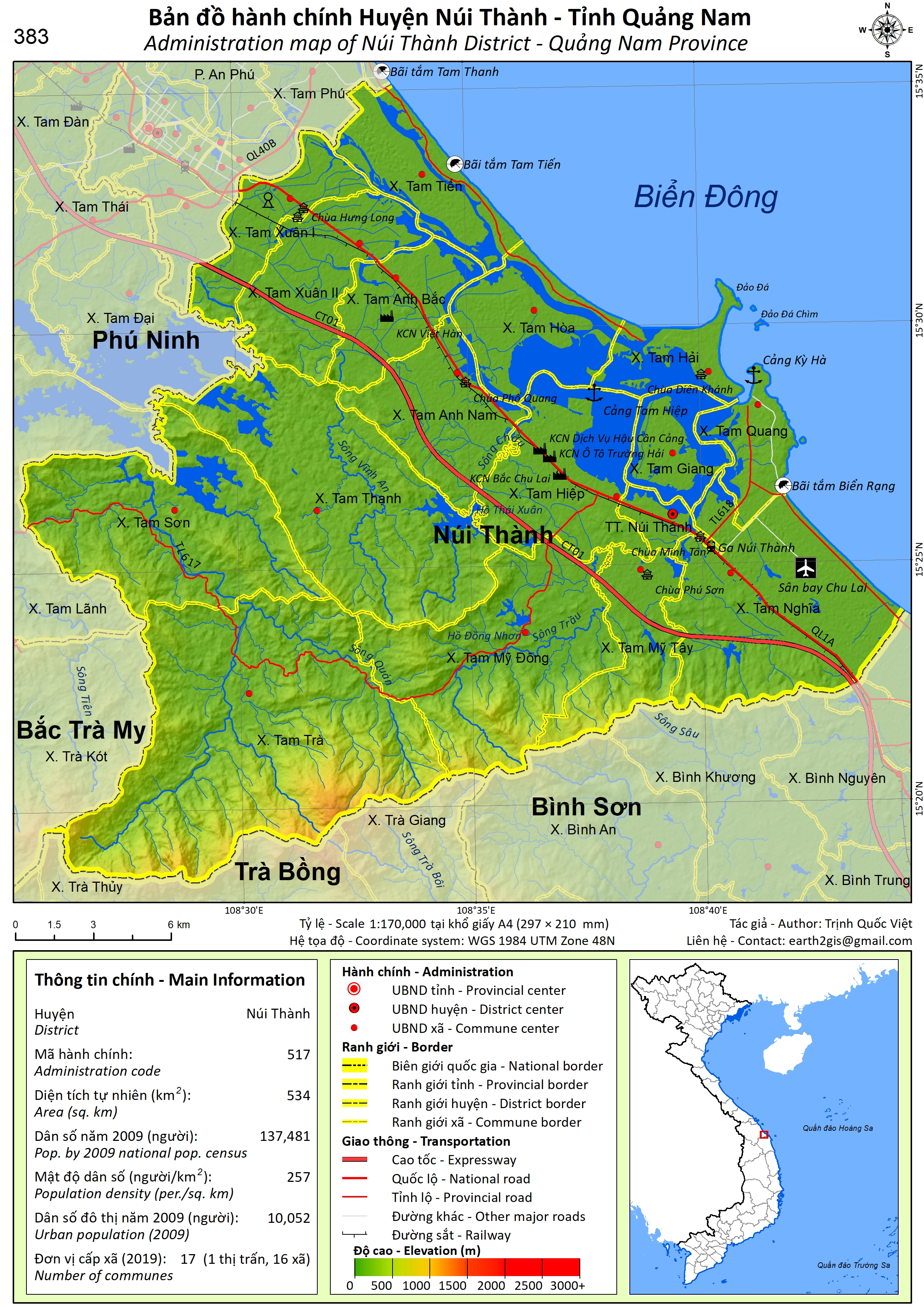
Administration map of Núi Thành district

The district was founded on December 3, 1983, when Tam Kỳ district was partitioned into Núi Thành District and the provincial city Tam Kỳ of Quảng Nam – Đà Nẵng Province. Since November 26, 1996, the district has been part of Quảng Nam province with Núi Thành as the district center.

== Administrative divisions ==
Núi Thành district is divided into 1 town, Núi Thành (also the district capital), and 16 communes: Tam Anh Bắc, Tam Anh Nam, Tam Giang, Tam Hải, Tam Hiệp, Tam Hòa, Tam Mỹ Đông, Tam Mỹ Tây, Tam Nghĩa, Tam Quang, Tam Sơn, Tam Thạnh, Tam Tiến, Tam Trà, Tam Xuân 1 and Tam Xuân 2.

No	Name of subdivision	Area (ha)	Population
1	Núi Thành town	457.48	10,001
2	Tam Xuân 1 commune	1,727.25	12,341
3	Tam Xuân 2 commune	2,359.28	11,891
4	Tam Tiến commune	2,091.43	11,371
5	Tam Sơn commune	5,402.46	4,664
6	Tam Thạnh commune	5,395.80	4,056
7	Tam Anh Bắc	2,100	6,409
8	Tam Anh Nam	2,191	9,316
9	Tam Hòa	2,260.81	8,563
10	Tam Hiệp	3,758.36	10,217
11	Tam Hải	1,560.71	7,925
12	Tam Giang	1,150.75	5,995
13	Tam Quang	1,137.97	13,026
14	Tam Nghĩa	5,167.75	11,815
15	Tam Mỹ Đông	1,727	6,400
16	Tam Mỹ Tây	5,104	5,869
17	Tam Trà	9,712.62	2,886

Source: Quang Nam Home Department, 2008
