= Tam Kỳ =

Ward of Da Nang, Vietnam

Tam Kỳ Phường Tam Kỳ
- Ward
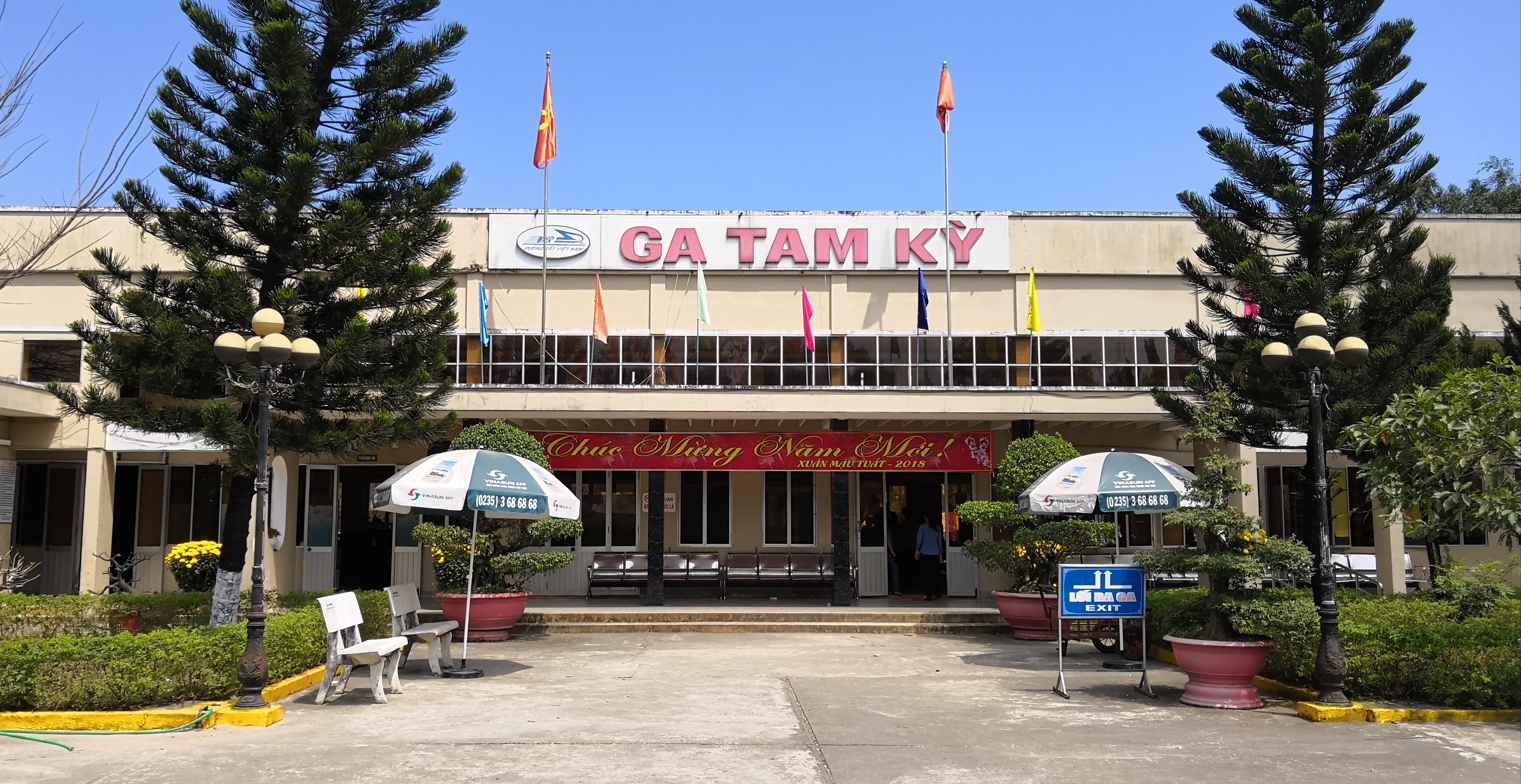
- Tam Kỳ station
- Interactive map of Tam Kỳ
- Coordinates: 15°34′14″N 108°28′24″E
- Country: Vietnam
- City: Da Nang
- Established: 16 June 2025

Area
  - Total: 3.23 sq mi (8.36 km^{2})

Population (2025)
  - Total: 44,075
  - Density: 13,700/sq mi (5,270/km^{2})
- Time zone: UTC+07:00 (Indochina Time)
- Administrative code: 20341

Tam Kỳ (Vietnamese: Phường Tam Kỳ) is a ward of Da Nang, Vietnam. It is one of the 94 new wards, communes and special zones of the city following the reorganization in 2025.

== History ==
On 16 June 2025, the National Assembly Standing Committee issued Resolution No. 1659/NQ-UBTVQH15 on the arrangement of commune-level administrative units of Da Nang in 2025 (effective from 16 June 2025). Accordingly, the entire land area and population of An Mỹ, An Xuân and Trường Xuân of the former Tam Kỳ city will be integrated into a new ward named Tam Kỳ (Clause 21, Article 1).
