= Tam Kỳ station =

Railway station in Tam Kỳ, Vietnam

Tam Kỳ
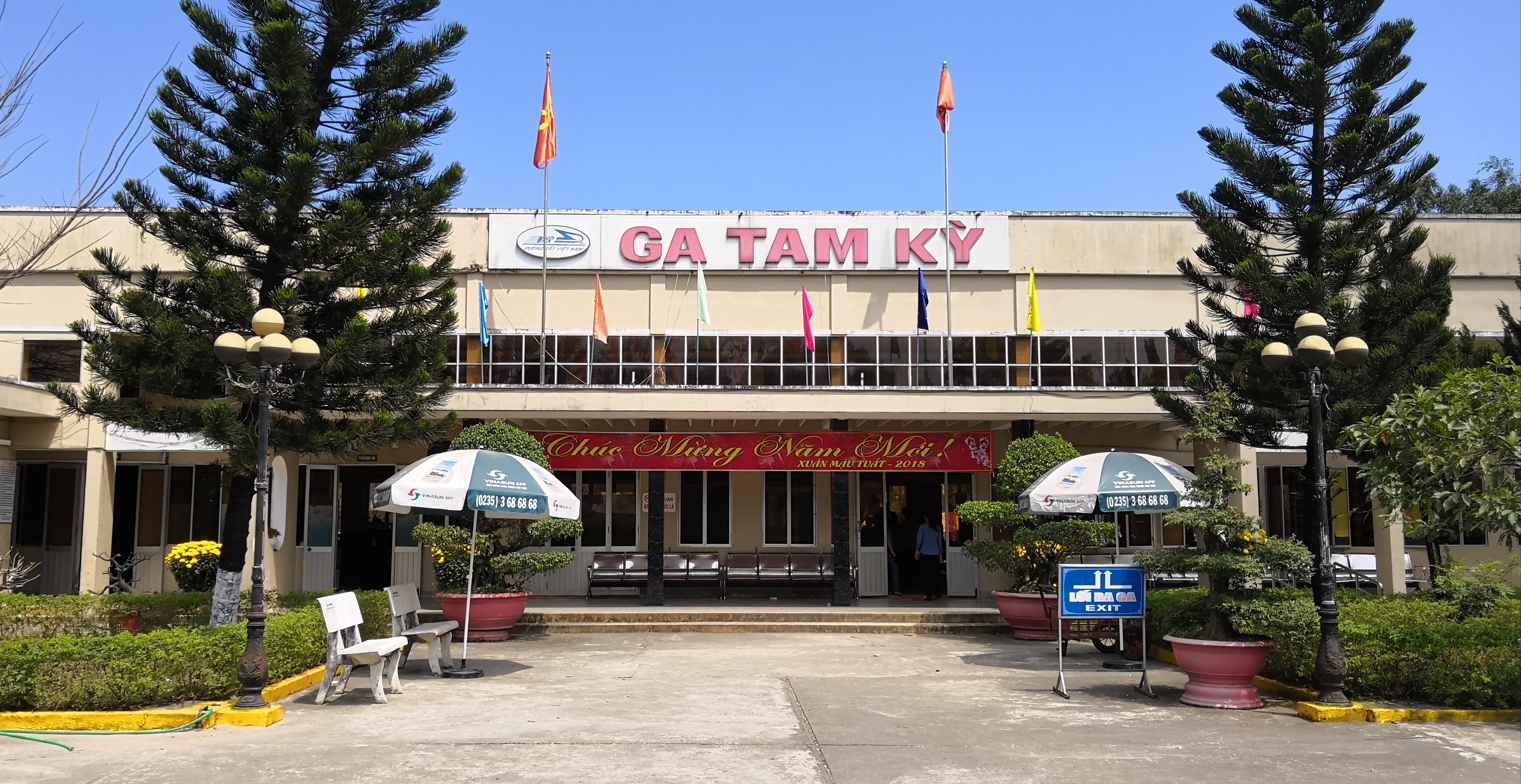

General information
- Location: Vietnam
- Coordinates: 15°33′26″N 108°29′02″E
Location

Tam Kỳ station is one of the main railway stations on the North–South railway (Reunification Express) in Vietnam. It serves the city of Tam Kỳ.
