= Paul Kalanithi =

Indian-American neurosurgeon and writer (1977–2015)

- Born: April 1, 1977
- Died: March 9, 2015 (aged 37)
- Education: Stanford University (BA, MA); Darwin College, Cambridge (MPhil); Yale Medical School (MD)
- Occupations: Neurosurgeon; Writer
- Spouse: Lucy Goddard
- Children: 1
- Medical career
- Institutions: Stanford University School of Medicine

Paul Sudhir Arul Kalanithi (April 1, 1977 – March 9, 2015) was an American neurosurgeon, neuroscientist, and writer. His book When Breath Becomes Air is a memoir about his life and illness with stage IV metastatic lung cancer. It was posthumously published by Random House in January 2016. It was on The New York Times Non-Fiction Best Seller list for multiple weeks.

== Early life and education ==
Paul Kalanithi was born on April 1, 1977, and lived in Westchester, New York. He was born to a Christian family hailing from Tamil Nadu and Andhra Pradesh, India. Kalanithi had two brothers, Jeevan and Suman; Jeevan is a computer/robotics engineer and Suman is a neurologist. The family moved from Bronxville, New York, to Kingman, Arizona, when Kalanithi was 10. Kalanithi attended Kingman High School, where he graduated as valedictorian.

Kalanithi attended Stanford University, where he graduated with a Bachelor of Arts in human biology and a Master of Arts in English literature in 2000. After Stanford, he attended the University of Cambridge, where he studied at Darwin College and graduated with a Master of Philosophy in the History and Philosophy of Science and Medicine. Although he initially considered pursuing a Ph.D. in English Literature, Kalanithi then attended the Yale School of Medicine, where he graduated in 2007 cum laude, winning the Dr. Louis H. Nahum Prize for his research on Tourette's syndrome. He was inducted into the Alpha Omega Alpha national medical honor society.

At Yale, Kalanithi met fellow medical student Lucy Goddard, who would become his wife.

== Career ==
After graduating from medical school, Kalanithi returned to Stanford to complete his residency training in neurosurgery and a postdoctoral fellowship in neuroscience at Stanford University School of Medicine.

In May 2013, Kalanithi was diagnosed with metastatic stage IV non-small-cell EGFR-positive lung cancer. He died on March 9, 2015, aged 37.

== Personal life ==
Kalanithi married Lucy (née Goddard), with whom he had a daughter in 2014, Elizabeth Acadia ("Cady"). Lucy is an associate professor at Stanford University School of Medicine and wrote the epilogue to When Breath Becomes Air. Lucy is the twin sister of Joanna Goddard of the blog A Cup of Jo. Lucy has been in a relationship with North Carolina lawyer John Duberstein since Kalanithi's death. Duberstein's wife Nina Riggs was a poet who wrote a memoir as she succumbed to cancer. Lucy had been in touch with Nina and even wrote a blurb for Nina's book; after Nina's death John reached out to Lucy for advice on how to grieve.

Although Kalanithi was raised in a devout Christian family, he turned away from the faith in his teens and twenties in favor of other ideas. However, he retained "the central values of Christianity — sacrifice, redemption, forgiveness" and returned to Christianity later in his life. In his book, he writes that if he had been more religious in his youth, he would have become a pastor.

Kalanithi never smoked.

== Bibliography ==
=== Non-fiction books ===
- When Breath Becomes Air

=== Essays ===
- "How Long Have I Got Left?" for The New York Times
- "Before I go: Time warps for a young surgeon with metastatic lung cancer" for Stanford Medicine Magazine
- Kalanithi, Paul (2016-01-11). "My Last Day as a Surgeon". The New Yorker. ISSN 0028-792X.
- "Terra Incognita: Remembering Sherwin Nuland" for The Paris Review

=== Scholarly articles ===
Only first-authored articles are listed below

- O'Shea DJ*, Kalanithi P*, Ferenczi EA*, Hsueh B, Chandrasekaran C, Goo W, Diester I, Ramakrishnan C, Kaufman MT, Ryu SI, Yeom KW, Deisseroth K, Shenoy KV. Scientific Reports. 2018 Apr 30;8(1):6775. doi:10.1038/s41598-018-24362-7. *Co-first author.
- Kalanithi, P. S.; Arrigo, R. T.; Tran, P; Gephart, M. H.; Shuer, L; Fisher, R; Boakye, M (2014). "Rehospitalization and emergency department use rates before and after vagus nerve stimulation for epilepsy: Use of state databases to provide longitudinal data across multiple clinical settings". Neuromodulation: Technology at the Neural Interface. 17 (1): 60–4, discussion 64–5. doi:10.1111/ner.12051. PMID 23551457. S2CID 46274667.
- Kalanithi, P. S.; Henderson, J. M. (2012). "Optogenetic Neuromodulation". Emerging Horizons in Neuromodulation – New Frontiers in Brain and Spine Stimulation. International Review of Neurobiology. Vol. 107. pp. 185–205. doi:10.1016/B978-0-12-404706-8.00010-3. ISBN 978-0-12-404706-8. PMID 23206683.
- Kalanithi, P. A.; Arrigo, R; Boakye, M (2012). "Morbid obesity increases cost and complication rates in spinal arthrodesis". Spine. 37 (11): 982–8. doi:10.1097/BRS.0b013e31823bbeef. PMID 22037526. S2CID 15167313.
- Kalanithi, P; Schubert, R. D.; Lad, S. P.; Harris, O. A.; Boakye, M (2011). "Hospital costs, incidence, and inhospital mortality rates of traumatic subdural hematoma in the United States". Journal of Neurosurgery. 115 (5): 1013–8. doi:10.3171/2011.6.JNS101989. PMID 21819196.
- Kalanithi PS, Patil CG, Boakye M (2009). "National complication rates and disposition after posterior lumbar fusion for acquired spondylolisthesis". Spine. 34 (18): 1963–9. doi:10.1097/BRS.0b013e3181ae2243. PMID 19652635. S2CID 42579192.
- Kalanithi, P. S.; Zheng, W; Kataoka, Y; Difiglia, M; Grantz, H; Saper, C. B.; Schwartz, M. L.; Leckman, J. F.; Vaccarino, F. M. (2005). "Altered parvalbumin-positive neuron distribution in basal ganglia of individuals with Tourette syndrome". Proceedings of the National Academy of Sciences. 102 (37): 13307–12. Bibcode:2005PNAS..10213307K. doi:10.1073/pnas.0502624102. PMC 1201574. PMID 16131542. father. name.
