= Mohave Union High School Gymnasium =

United States historic place in Kingman, Arizona

- U.S. National Register of Historic Places
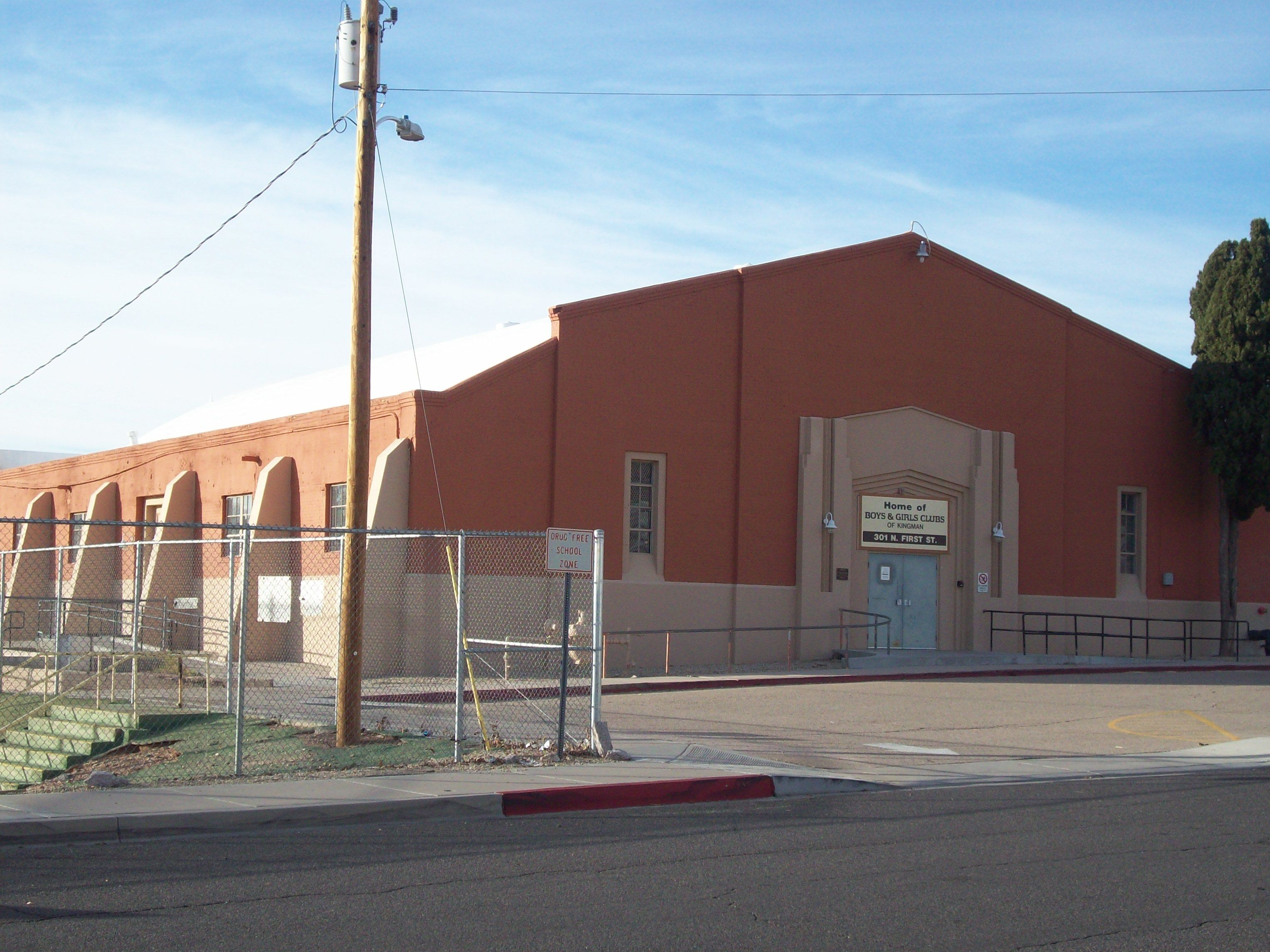

- Location within Arizona Location within the United States
- Location: 301 First Street; Kingman, Arizona
- Coordinates: 35°11′29″N 114°3′27″W
- Built: 1936
- Architect: J. Harve Kester; P. W. Womack
- Architectural style: Moderne
- MPS: Kingman MRA
- NRHP reference No.: 86001142
- Added to NRHP: May 14, 1986

The Mohave Union High School Gymnasium is the original gymnasium of Mohave County Union High School, now the site of Lee Williams High School, at 301 First Street in Kingman, Arizona. It is listed on the National Register of Historic Places for its lamella roof, which gives the building "exceptional merit".

== History ==
The gym was built in 1936, in the Moderne design, by the Works Progress Administration, and is one of three Moderne buildings in Kingman. P. W. Womack was the contractor from Phoenix and J. Harve Kester was the WPA inspector. It cost $50,000 to build.

In 1986, the building was listed on the National Register of Historic Places. In 1994, after the high school moved onto a new campus, the gym became the home of the Boys and Girls Club of Kingman and was also used by the new middle school using the high school site, White Cliffs Middle School.

In 2012, the gymnasium regained a high school when the new Lee Williams High School opened. A new auxiliary gymnasium has since been built alongside the old one.

== Architecture ==
The gymnasium measures 200x90 feet. It is made of concrete brick with a concrete foundation and stucco walls. Later additions to the site included replaced entry windows and doors and an addition to the rear.

There are two architectural oddities about the gymnasium. It uses buttresses, the only structure in Kingman to do so, and also has Kingman's only lamella roof, which is described as "an unusual method of construction in Arizona". Only one other gymnasium in the state used a lamella roof, the gymnasium at Phoenix Union High School, built circa 1940 and demolished in the late 1980s.

The building additionally has Art Deco-style detailing. It is one of three Moderne style buildings in Kingman.
