= Tam Anh =

Tam Anh Xã Tam Anh
- Commune
- Interactive map of Tam Anh
- Coordinates: 15°27′46″N 108°34′32″E
- Country: Vietnam
- Municipality: Da Nang
- Established: June 16, 2025

Area
  - Total: 26.58 sq mi (68.84 km^{2})

Population (2024)
  - Total: 31,026
  - Density: 1,167/sq mi (450.7/km^{2})
- Time zone: UTC+07:00 (Indochina Time)
- Administrative code: 20984
- Website: http://tamanh.danang.gov.vn/

Tam Anh (Vietnamese: Xã Tam Anh) is a commune of Da Nang, Vietnam. It is one of the 102 new wards, communes and special zones of the province following the reorganization in 2025.

== History ==
On June 16, 2025, the National Assembly Standing Committee issued Resolution No. 1659/NQ-UBTVQH15 on the arrangement of commune-level administrative units of Da Nang in 2025 (effective from June 16, 2025). Accordingly, the entire land area and population of Tam Hòa, Tam Anh Bắc and Tam Anh Nam communes of the former Núi Thành district will be integrated into a new commune named Tam Anh (Clause 29, Article 1).
