= When Breath Becomes Air =

Autobiographical book by Paul Kalanithi

- First edition (US)
- Author: Paul Kalanithi
- Language: English
- Subject: Autobiography
- Publisher: Random House (US); Bodley Head (UK)
- Publication date: January 12, 2016
- Publication place: United States
- Media type: Print
- Pages: 228
- ISBN: 9781847923677 Hardback
- OCLC: 909925278
- Dewey Decimal: 616.99/424
- LC Class: RC280

When Breath Becomes Air is a non-fiction autobiographical book written by American neurosurgeon Paul Kalanithi. It is a memoir about his life and battling stage IV metastatic lung cancer. It was posthumously published by Random House on January 12, 2016.

In his last year of neurosurgical residency at Stanford University, Kalanithi experiences negative changes in his health. Rapid weight loss and severe back and chest pains begin to raise concern for him and his wife, Lucy Kalanithi. He worries that cancer might have caused his symptoms and his decline in health – unlikely for people in their thirties. However, when the X-ray results in a routine medical check-up return normal, he and his primary care physician attribute the symptoms to aging and work overload.

Determined to finish the last months of his residency, he ignores whatever symptoms have not subsided. A few weeks later, the symptoms come back, stronger than before. Around this time, Kalanithi and his wife experience conflict in their relationship when Lucy feels that he is not communicating with her. Visiting friends in New York, Kalanithi is almost certain that he has cancer and says it out loud for the first time to his friend Mike. Returning home, upon landing in San Francisco, Kalanithi receives a call from his doctor telling him that his lungs "look blurry." When he arrives home with Lucy, both of them know what is happening. The next day, Kalanithi checks in to the hospital, and the room where he examined his patients, delivering good and bad news, becomes his own.

== Background ==
Before writing When Breath Becomes Air, Kalanithi was in residency in neurological surgery and a postdoctoral fellowship in neuroscience. In May 2013, he was diagnosed with stage-4 non-small-cell EGFR-positive lung cancer.

As Kalanithi underwent cancer treatment, he shared his reflections on illness and medicine, authoring essays in The New York Times, The Paris Review, and Stanford Medicine, and participating in interviews for media outlets and public forums. He also began work on an autobiographical book of his experiences as a doctor and a patient facing a terminal illness.

Kalanithi died in March 2015 at the age of 37. His memoir was published posthumously 10 months later. The book includes a foreword by Abraham Verghese and an epilogue by Kalanithi's widow, Lucy Goddard Kalanithi.

=== Paul Kalanithi ===
The author of the book, Paul Kalanithi, was born in Bronxville, New York, on April 1, 1977. At the age of 10, his family moved to Kingman, Arizona, where he spent most of his youth. Kalanithi attended Stanford University where he earned a Bachelor and Master of Arts in English literature and a Bachelor of Science in human biology. He attended Cambridge for history and philosophy of science and medicine where he obtained his master's degree. After Cambridge, Kalanithi attended Yale for medical school where he met his future wife, Lucy Goddard. After graduating from Yale, they got married and began their residencies in California. Kalanithi started his residency back at Stanford while his wife attended the University of California, San Francisco. Paul and Lucy had a daughter together.

== Synopsis ==
Following the prospect of a better life, Kalanithi's father moves the family from Bronxville, New York, to Kingman, Arizona, when Kalanithi is ten. A doctor himself, Kalanithi's father dedicates most of his time to medicine and is notably absent from the house. Believing that to be a doctor, he would have to be away from the family like his father, Kalanithi becomes disenchanted with medicine. Although he and his two brothers enjoy the newfound liberty of their desert town, their mother constantly worries about their academic future in a town that the U.S. census has declared “the least educated district in America.” Unwilling to let anything halt their learning, she acquires college reading lists and instills in her sons a love for literature. The summer before heading to Stanford University for school, Kalanithi reads Satan, His Psychotherapy and Cure by the Unfortunate Dr. Kassler, J.S.P.S., by Jeremy Leven. The book's idea that the mind is the result of the brain doing its work awakes a particular curiosity in Kalanithi for neuroscience.

After completing degrees in English literature and human biology, Kalanithi feels there is still much to learn. He is accepted to a master's program in English literature at Stanford, and one afternoon—pushed by his desire to understand the meaning of life— discovers the calling to practice medicine for the first time. Preparing to apply to medical school, Kalanithi uses the time off to study the history and philosophy of science and medicine at Cambridge. He later starts medical school at Yale. During his time at Yale, Kalanithi meets his wife, Lucy, and sees the patient-doctor relationship as an example of life, death, and morality coming together. After two years of classroom learning, Kalanithi experiences his first birth and death in his OB-GYN clinical rotation, when a set of twins could not be carried to term. It is then that Kalanithi understands that intelligence is not enough in the practice of medicine and that morality is also needed. After medical school, Lucy Kalanithi starts an internal medicine residency at UCSF, and Paul Kalanithi begins a neurosurgical residency at Stanford. Though he finds it hard at first, Kalanithi grows used to the rigor of neurosurgery and, in his fourth year, joins the neuroscience lab of a professor affectionately called “V.” In the sixth year of residency, Kalanithi returns to his hospital duties and having reached professional recognition, he feels he has finally found his place in the world.

Kalanithi's life takes an unexpected turn when, after weeks of health problems, it is confirmed that he has lung cancer. Images obtained from a CT scan show organ systems compromised by cancer, causing him and his wife great sadness. Searching for the best experts in the field of oncology, Kalanithi begins treatment with a doctor named Emma Hayward. Because of his status, rather than stepping back and letting Hayward offer her professional opinion, Kalanithi expects to be treated as a consultant, even if it is his own case. Hayward suggests finding the root of his cancer before determining treatment options. In the meantime, Kalanithi's family helps him through his transition from doctor to patient, and together with Lucy, he decides to explore reproductive options before he dies. They visit a sperm bank and make a decision to have a child. Test results arrive, and Kalanithi discovers that his cancer is derived from a mutation in the epidermal growth factor receptor (EGFR). This fact gives him a bit of relief because it means that he can be treated with Tarceva, which typically results in less-severe side effects compared to traditional chemotherapy.

Symptoms subside with the treatment, and in Dr. Hayward's office, Kalanithi feels like himself again. After weeks of using the medication, CT scans show a reduced number of tumors in Kalanithi's lungs, and he becomes determined to return to the operating room. Back in the OR, he cannot finish his first surgery because of his health. However, his strength and technique improve over time. With both graduation and a baby due in June, he takes another CT scan after months since the last. He discovers a big tumor in his right lung, and without getting scared, he and Lucy research what other options are available. Kalanithi retires from surgery indefinitely and begins chemotherapy. His response to chemotherapy is adverse, and his health worsens, forcing him to skip graduation. With the failure of chemotherapy, other treatment options do not provide him much hope. His condition becomes so severe that even Dr. Hayward gives an approximation of how much time he has left – something she had strongly refused to do before. On July 4, 2014, their daughter was born and Kalanithi is filled with joy. Eventually, Kalanithi dies in the intensive care unit of his hospital.

The epilogue is written by his wife, Lucy Kalanithi, after his death. It shows her point of view on the experience with her husband Paul Kalanithi's lung cancer. It is an in-depth personal explanation of her experience.

== Reception ==
When Breath Becomes Air is a New York Times bestseller, spending 68 weeks on the non-fiction bestseller list. The book received starred reviews from Kirkus Reviews and Library Journal.

Kirkus called the book a "moving meditation on mortality by a gifted writer whose dual perspectives of physician and patient provide a singular clarity."

Matt McCarthy of USA Today gave it 4 out of 4 stars and said, "It's a story so remarkable, so stunning, and so affecting that I had to take dozens of breaks just to compose myself enough to get through it." Nick Romeo of The Boston Globe wrote that it "possesses the gravity and wisdom of an ancient Greek tragedy." Melissa Maerz of Entertainment Weekly stated that the book was "so original—and so devastating. . . . Its only fault is that the book, like his life, ends much too early."

=== Awards and honors ===
Awards for When Breath Becomes Air
Year	Award	Result	Ref.
2016	Goodreads Choice Award for Memoir & Autobiography	Winner	
2016	Waterstones Book of the Year	Shortlist	
2017	Jan Michalski Prize	Second selection	
2017	Prix Jan Michalski	Second selection	
2017	Pulitzer Prize, Biography or Autobiography	Finalist	
2017	Wellcome Book Prize	Shortlist	
