= List of Samuel L. Jackson performances =

Filmography

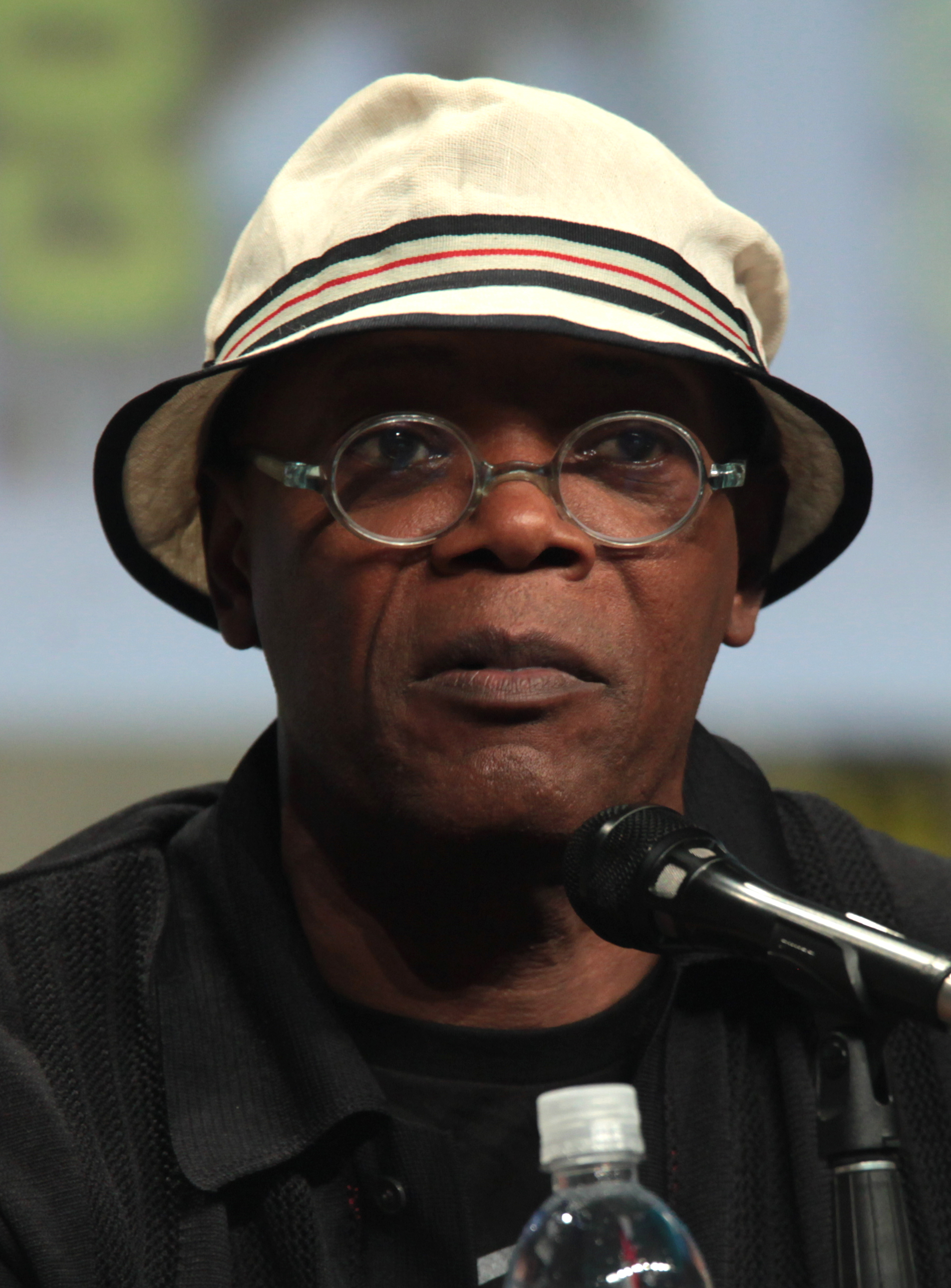
Jackson at the 2014 San Diego Comic-Con

Samuel L. Jackson is an American actor and film producer. A highly-prolific actor who has starred in over 150 film roles to date, Jackson's films have collectively grossed over $27 billion, making him the fourth highest-grossing live-action actor of all time as of 2026. (Note: Due to his large number of cameo appearances, Stan Lee is the highest-grossing actor of all time. As of 2021, Jackson is second. When cameo appearances are ignored and only live-action roles considered, Jackson is the highest-grossing actor.)

Jackson debuted on film with a leading role in the Michael Schultz-directed Together for Days (1972). His other early film appearances were minor roles in films, such as Ragtime (1981), Coming to America (1988), Do the Right Thing (1989), Goodfellas (1990) and The Exorcist III (1990). His breakthrough role was the crack-addict Gator in Spike Lee's Jungle Fever (1991), for which Jackson won a Special Jury Prize for Best Supporting Actor at the 1991 Cannes Film Festival. He appeared in Jurassic Park in 1993 and, a year later, starred in the Quentin Tarantino-directed Pulp Fiction. For the latter film, Jackson won the BAFTA Award for Best Actor in a Supporting Role and received nominations for the Academy Award for Best Supporting Actor and a Golden Globe Award. In 1994, he was also nominated for a Golden Globe Award for Best Actor for his performance in Against the Wall. The following year, he starred opposite Bruce Willis in Die Hard with a Vengeance. Jackson's performance in A Time to Kill (1996) garnered him a Golden Globe nomination for Best Supporting Actor. He then collaborated with Tarantino on Jackie Brown (1997), for which he received a Golden Globe nomination. Two years later, he starred in the science fiction horror film Deep Blue Sea.

Beginning with The Phantom Menace in 1999, Jackson played Mace Windu in the Star Wars prequel trilogy, and he has reprised the role in later entries. In 2000, he had a leading role in the remake of Shaft. Also that year, he starred opposite Bruce Willis in the M. Night Shyamalan-directed Unbreakable. He returned to this role in Glass (2019). In 2004, he voiced Frozone in Pixar's The Incredibles and Officer Frank Tenpenny in the video game Grand Theft Auto: San Andreas. Jackson appears in the Marvel Cinematic Universe as Nick Fury, starting in Iron Man (2008) and has reprised the role in ten films and three television series. In 2011, he starred opposite Tommy Lee Jones in The Sunset Limited, an adaptation of Cormac McCarthy's play of the same name. The following year, he collaborated with Tarantino again on Django Unchained. He starred opposite Kurt Russell in The Hateful Eight (2015), also directed by Tarantino. In the latter half of the 2010s, Jackson starred in blockbuster films such as Kingsman: The Secret Service (2015) and Kong: Skull Island (2017).

Jackson has appeared in three stage productions. In the early 1980s, he performed in Off-Broadway productions of Mother Courage and Her Children and A Soldier's Play. From 2011 to 2012, he portrayed Martin Luther King Jr. in The Mountaintop on Broadway. Jackson has also lent his voice to six video games and two audiobooks. He received an Academy Honorary Award in 2022.

== Film ==
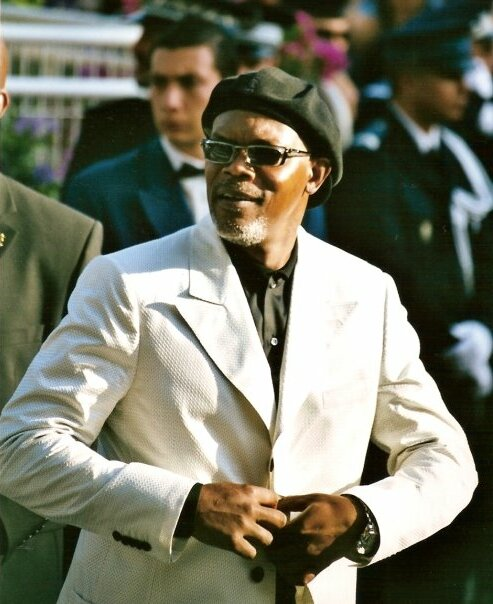
Jackson at the Cannes Film Festival in 2005

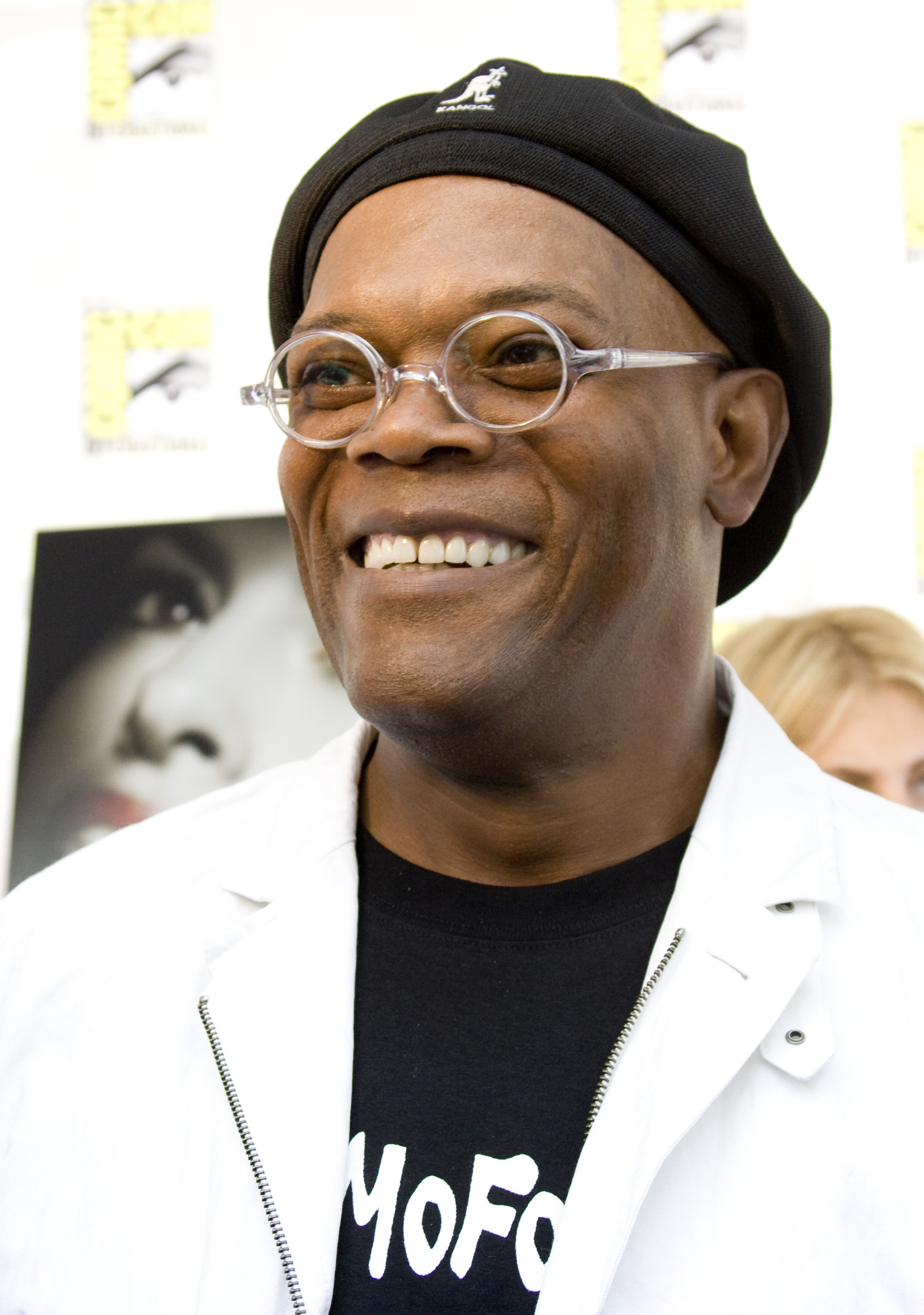
Jackson at San Diego Comic-Con in 2008

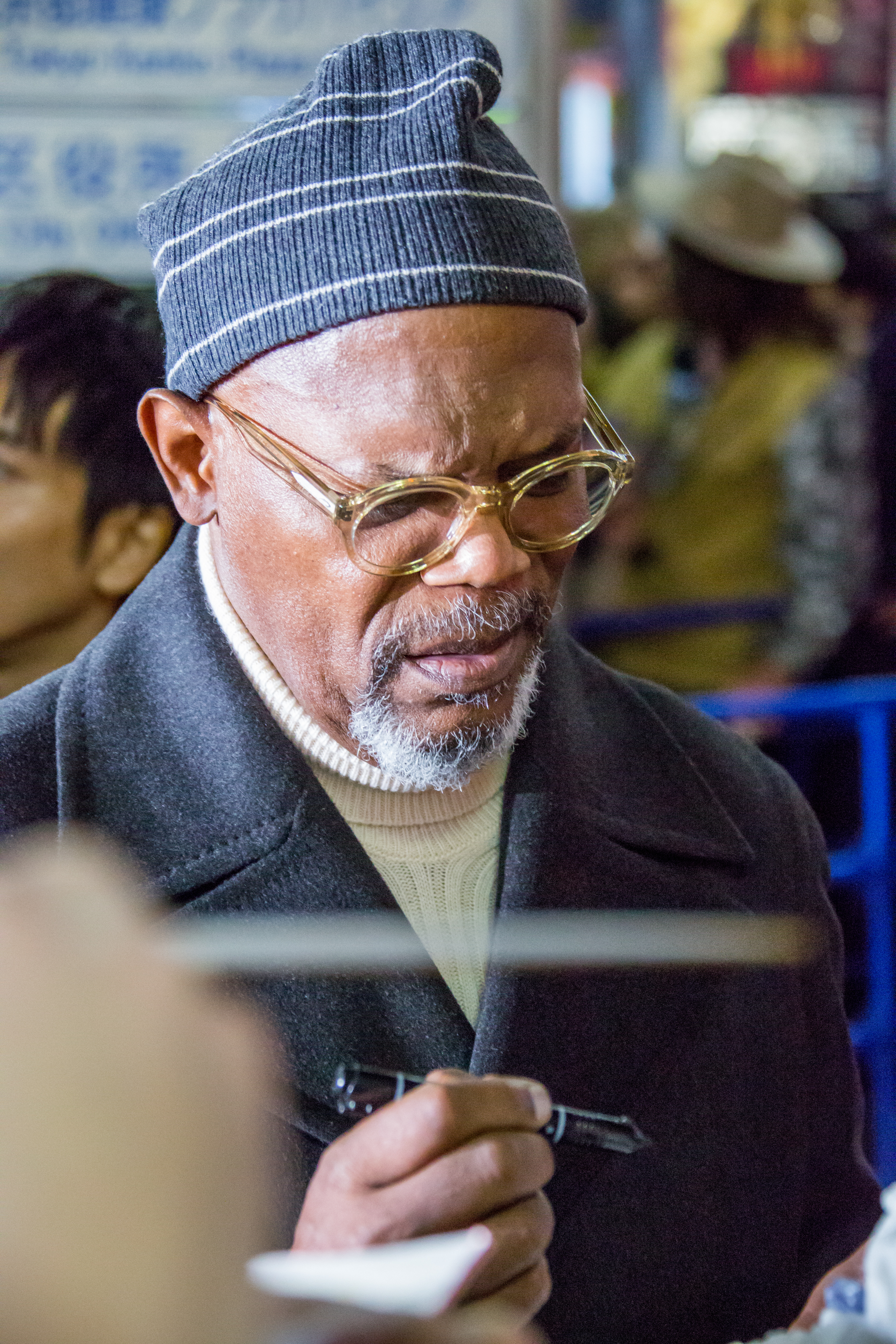
Jackson at the Japanese premiere of Kong: Skull Island in 2017

Table featuring feature films with Samuel L. Jackson
Year	Title	Role	Notes	Ref.
1972	Together for Days	Stan		
1981	Ragtime	Gang member No. 2		
1987	Eddie Murphy Raw	Jon Kelcourse		
1987	Magic Sticks	Bum		
1988	Coming to America	Hold-Up Man		
1988	School Daze	Leeds		
1989	Do the Right Thing	Mister Señor Love Daddy	Credited as Sam Jackson	
1989	Sea of Love	Black Guy		
1990	Def by Temptation	Minister Garth		
1990	A Shock to the System	Ulysses		
1990	Betsy's Wedding	Taxi Dispatcher		
1990	Mo' Better Blues	Madlock		
1990	The Exorcist III	Blind Dream Man		
1990	Goodfellas	Stacks Edwards		
1990	The Return of Superfly	Nate Cabot	Credited as Sam Jackson	
1991	Strictly Business	Monroe	Credited as Sam Jackson	
1991	Jungle Fever	Gator Purify		
1991	Jumpin' at the Boneyard	Mr. Simpson		
1991	Johnny Suede	B-Bop		
1992	Juice	Trip		
1992	Patriot Games	Robby Jackson		
1992	White Sands	Greg Meeker	Credited as Sam Jackson	
1992	Fathers & Sons	Marshall		
1993	Menace II Society	Tat Lawson		
1993	Loaded Weapon 1	Sgt. Wes Luger		
1993	Amos & Andrew	Andrew Sterling		
1993	Jurassic Park	John "Ray" Arnold		
1993	True Romance	Big Don		
1994	Fresh	Sam		
1994	Pulp Fiction	Jules Winnfield		
1994	The New Age	Dale		
1994	Hail Caesar	Mailman		
1994	Assault at West Point: The Court-Martial of Johnson Whittaker	Richard Theodore Greener		
1994	The Search for One-eye Jimmy	Colonel Ron		
1995	Kiss of Death	Calvin Hart		
1995	Die Hard with a Vengeance	Zeus Carver		
1995	Losing Isaiah	Kadar Lewis		
1995	Fluke	Rumbo	Voice	
1996	The Great White Hype	Rev. Fred Sultan		
1996	A Time to Kill	Carl Lee Hailey		
1996	The Long Kiss Goodnight	Mitch Henessey		
1996	Hard Eight	Jimmy		
1996	Trees Lounge	Wendell		
1997	One Eight Seven	Trevor Garfield		
1997	Eve's Bayou	Louis Batiste	Also producer	
1997	Jackie Brown	Ordell Robbie		
1998	Sphere	Harry Adams		
1998	The Negotiator	Lt. Danny Roman		
1998	The Red Violin	Charles Morritz		
1998	Out of Sight	Hejira Henry	Uncredited	
1999	Star Wars: Episode I – The Phantom Menace	Mace Windu		
1999	Deep Blue Sea	Russell Franklin		
2000	Rules of Engagement	Col. Terry L. Childers		
2000	Shaft	John Shaft		
2000	Unbreakable	Elijah Price / Mr. Glass		
2001	The Caveman's Valentine	Romulus Ledbetter	Also executive producer	
2001	The 51st State	Elmo McElroy		
2002	Changing Lanes	Doyle Gipson		
2002	Star Wars: Episode II – Attack of the Clones	Mace Windu		
2002	XXX	Agent Augustus Gibbons		
2002	No Good Deed	Jack Friar		
2003	Basic	Sergeant Nathan West		
2003	S.W.A.T.	Hondo Harrelson		
2004	Twisted	John Mills		
2004	Kill Bill: Volume 2	Organ player		
2004	Kill Bill: The Whole Bloody Affair	Organ player		
2004	The Incredibles	Lucius Best / Frozone	Voice	
2004	In My Country	Langston Whitfield		
2004	Unforgivable Blackness	Jack Johnson	Voice, documentary	
2005	Coach Carter	Ken Carter		
2005	XXX: State of the Union	Agent Augustus Gibbons		
2005	Star Wars: Episode III – Revenge of the Sith	Mace Windu		
2005	The Man	Derrick Vann		
2006	Freedomland	Lorenzo Council		
2006	Snakes on a Plane	Agent Neville Flynn		
2006	Home of the Brave	Dr. Will Marsh		
2006	Black Snake Moan	Lazarus Redd		
2007	Farce of the Penguins	Narrator		
2007	1408	Gerald Olin		
2007	Resurrecting the Champ	Bob Satterfield		
2007	Cleaner	Thomas "Tom" Cutler	Also producer	
2008	Jumper	Agent Roland Cox		
2008	Iron Man	Nick Fury	Uncredited cameo; post-credits scene	
2008	Star Wars: The Clone Wars	Mace Windu	Voice	
2008	Lakeview Terrace	Abel Turner		
2008	Soul Men	Louis		
2008	The Spirit	The Octopus		
2008	Gospel Hill	Paul Malcolm	Uncredited	
2009	Astro Boy	Zog	Voice	
2009	Mother and Child	Paul		
2009	Inglourious Basterds	Narrator		
2010	Quantum Quest: A Cassini Space Odyssey	Admiral Fear	Voice	
2010	Unthinkable	Henry Harold Humphries		
2010	Iron Man 2	Nick Fury		
2010	The Other Guys	Detective PK Highsmith		
2011	African Cats	Narrator	Documentary	
2011	Thor	Nick Fury	Uncredited cameo; post-credits scene	
2011	Captain America: The First Avenger	Nick Fury		
2011	Arena	Logan		
2012	The Samaritan	Foley		
2012	Meeting Evil	Richie		
2012	The Avengers	Nick Fury		
2012	Zambezia	Tendai	Voice	
2012	Django Unchained	Stephen Warren		
2013	Turbo	Whiplash	Voice	
2013	Oldboy	Chaney		
2014	Reasonable Doubt	Clinton Davis		
2014	RoboCop	Patrick "Pat" Novak		
2014	Captain America: The Winter Soldier	Nick Fury		
2014	Kite	Karl Aker		
2014	Big Game	Pres. William Alan Moore		
2015	Kingsman: The Secret Service	Richmond Valentine		
2015	Avengers: Age of Ultron	Nick Fury		
2015	Barely Lethal	Hardman		
2015	Chi-Raq	Dolmedes		
2015	The Hateful Eight	Major Marquis Warren		
2016	Cell	Tom McCourt		
2016	The Legend of Tarzan	George Washington Williams		
2016	I Am Not Your Negro	Narrator	Voice, documentary	
2016	Miss Peregrine's Home for Peculiar Children	Mr. Barron		
2016	Eating You Alive	Himself	Documentary	
2017	XXX: Return of Xander Cage	Agent Augustus Gibbons		
2017	Kong: Skull Island	Lt. Col. Preston Packard		
2017	The Hitman's Bodyguard	Darius Kincaid		
2017	Unicorn Store	The Salesman		
2018	Avengers: Infinity War	Nick Fury	Uncredited cameo; post-credits scene	
2018	Incredibles 2	Lucius Best / Frozone	Voice	
2018	Life Itself	Himself		
2019	Glass	Elijah Price / Mr. Glass		
2019	Captain Marvel	Nick Fury		
2019	Avengers: Endgame	Nick Fury	Cameo	
2019	Shaft	John Shaft II		
2019	Spider-Man: Far From Home	Nick Fury	(Note: In the post-credits scene of Spider-Man: Far From Home it is revealed that Nick Fury was Talos in disguise all along during all the movie.)	
2019	The Last Full Measure	Billy Takoda		
2019	QT8: The First Eight	Himself	Documentary	
2019	Star Wars: The Rise of Skywalker	Mace Windu	Cameo; voice	
2020	The Banker	Joe Morris	Also executive producer	
2021	Spiral: From the Book of Saw	Marcus Banks		
2021	Hitman's Wife's Bodyguard	Darius Kincaid		
2021	The Protégé	Moody Dutton		
2022	Paws of Fury: The Legend of Hank	Jimbo	Voice	
2022	Is That Black Enough for You?!?	Himself	Documentary	
2023	The Kill Room	Gordon		
2023	The Marvels	Nick Fury		
2024	Argylle	Alfred Solomon		
2024	Damaged	Dan Lawson		
2024	The Garfield Movie	Victor "Vic"	Voice	
2024	The Piano Lesson	Doaker Charles		
2024	The Unholy Trinity	St. Christopher		
2025	Afterburn	Valentine		
2026	Just Play Dead	Jack Wolfe		
2026	The Beast	President of the United States		
2027	The Great Beyond †	TBA	Post-production	

Key
†	Denotes films that have not yet been released

== Television ==
Table featuring television programs with Samuel L. Jackson
Year	Title	Role	Notes	Refs.
1976	Movin' On	Patrolman	Episode: "Woman of Steel"	
1977	The Displaced Person	Sulk	Television film	
1978	Milo Muse the Rabbit	Johnson Whitaker	Television film	
1986–1987	Spenser: For Hire	Leroy Clancy / Ned	2 episodes	
1987	Uncle Tom's Cabin	George Harris	Television film; credited as Samuel Jackson	
1989	Dead Man Out	Calvin Fredricks	HBO television movie; credited as Sam Jackson	
1989	A Man Called Hawk	Cutter	Episode: "Intensive Care"	
1989	The Days and Nights of Molly Dodd	Brother Elvis	Episode: "Here's Why You Should Always Make Your Bed in the Morning"	
1991	Law & Order	Louis Taggert	Episode: "The Violence of Summer"	
1991	Roc	Larry	Episode: "Hearts and Diamonds"	
1992	Ghostwriter	Reggie Jenkins	3 episodes	
1992	I'll Fly Away	Walter Harper	Episode: "Since Walter"	
1994	Against the Wall	Jamaal	Television film	
1995	Shaquille O'Neal: Larger than Life	Narrator	Documentary	
1996	11th Independent Spirit Awards	Himself (host)	Television special	
1997	12th Independent Spirit Awards	Himself (host)	Television special	
1997	Happily Ever After: Fairy Tales for Every Child	Mayor of Hamelin	Voice, episode: "The Pied Piper"	
1998	Saturday Night Live	Himself (host)	Episode: "Samuel L. Jackson/Ben Folds Five"	
1999	1999 ESPY Awards	Himself (host)	Television special	
2001	The Proud Family	Joseph	Voice, episode: "Seven Days of Kwanzaa"	
2001	2001 ESPY Awards	Himself (host)	Television special	
2002	2002 ESPY Awards	Himself (host)	Television special	
2002	Fighting for Freedom: Revolution & Civil War	Narrator	Documentary	
2002	The Art of Action: Martial Arts in the Movies	Himself (host)	Television special	
2002	Unchained Memories	Narrator	Documentary	
2005	20th Independent Spirit Awards	Himself (host)	Television special	
2005	Extras	Himself	Series 1, episode 5: "Samuel L. Jackson"	
2005–2010	The Boondocks	Gin Rummy	Voice, 3 episodes	
2005	2005 Spike Video Game Awards	Himself (host)	Television special	
2006	2006 Spike Video Game Awards	Himself (host)	Television special	
2006	Honor Deferred	Narrator	Documentary	
2007	Afro Samurai	Afro Samurai / Ninja Ninja	Also producer, voice	
2007	Respect Yourself: The Stax Records Story	Narrator	Documentary	
2007	2007 Spike Video Game Awards	Himself (host)	Television special	
2009	Afro Samurai: Resurrection	Afro Samurai / Ninja Ninja	Television film, voice	
2009	2009 ESPY Awards	Himself (host)	Television special	
2009	Uneven Fairways	Narrator	Documentary	
2011	The Sunset Limited	Black	Television film	
2011	Prohibition	Reader	One episode	
2011	Curiosity	Himself (host)	Episode: "How Will the World End?"	
2012	BET Awards 2012	Himself (host)	Television special	
2012	2012 Spike Video Game Awards	Himself (host)	Television special	
2013–2014	Agents of S.H.I.E.L.D.	Nick Fury	2 episodes	
2014	Black Dynamite	Captain Quinton	Voice, episode: "Black Jaws or Finger Lickin' Chicken of the Sea"	
2020	Staged	Himself	Episode: "Who The F**k is Michael Sheen?"	
2020	Star Wars: The Clone Wars	Mace Windu	Voice, episode: "Shattered" (archive recording only)	
2020	A West Wing Special to Benefit When We All Vote	Himself	Celebrity guest	
2020	Enslaved	Himself	Documentary series	
2020	Death to 2020	Dash Bracket	Television special	
2021	Amend: The Fight for America	Himself	2 episodes	
2021–2024	What If...?	Nick Fury / Sir Nicholas Fury	Voice, 7 episodes	
2022	The Last Days of Ptolemy Grey	Ptolemy Grey	Miniseries; also executive producer	
2023	Secret Invasion	Nick Fury	Miniseries; also executive producer	
2023	Marvel Studios: Assembled	Himself	Episode: "The Making of Secret Invasion"	
2024	Fight Night: The Million Dollar Heist	Frank Moten	Miniseries	
2025	Super Bowl LIX Halftime Show	Uncle Sam		
2025	Moon Girl and Devil Dinosaur	Nick Fury	Voice, episode: "Shoot for the Moon"	
2025	The American Revolution	Caesar Sarter / Boston King / Lemuel Haynes / Flag Resolution	Voice, TV documentary	
2025	Tulsa King	Russell Lee Washington Jr.	2 episodes	
2026	The Boys	Xander the Shark	Voice, episode: "The Frenchman, the Female, and the Man Called Mother's Milk"	
2026	Life, Larry and the Pursuit of Unhappiness	Voiceover Narrator	7 episodes	
TBA	Frisco King †	Russell Lee Washington Jr.		

Key
†	Denotes television productions that have not yet been released

== Theater ==
Table featuring video games with Samuel L. Jackson
Year(s)	Title	Role	Venue	Ref.
1980	Mother Courage and Her Children	Performer	The Public Theater, Off-Broadway	
1981–1983	A Soldier's Play	Pvt. Louis Henson	Theatre Four, Off-Broadway	
1987	The Piano Lesson	Boy Willie	Yale Repertory Theatre	
2011–2012	The Mountaintop	Martin Luther King Jr.	Bernard B. Jacobs Theatre, Broadway	
2022	The Piano Lesson	Doaker Charles	Ethel Barrymore Theatre, Broadway	

== Music videos ==
Table featuring music videos with Samuel L. Jackson
Year	Title	Artist(s)	Role	Ref.
1990	"911 Is a Joke"	Public Enemy	Father	
1999	"It's Alright (Send Me)"	Winans Phase 2	Himself	
2006	"Snakes on a Plane (Bring It)"	Cobra Starship featuring William Beckett, Travie McCoy and Maja Ivarsson	Himself	
2009	"Blame It"	Jamie Foxx featuring T-Pain	Clubber	
2024	"Electric Energy"	Ariana DeBose, Boy George and Nile Rodgers	Himself	

== Video games ==
Table featuring video games with Samuel L. Jackson
Year	Title	Role	Notes	Ref.
2004	Grand Theft Auto: San Andreas	Officer Frank Tenpenny		
2004	The Incredibles	Lucius Best / Frozone	Based on the movie	
2004	The Incredibles: When Danger Calls	Lucius Best / Frozone		
2009	Afro Samurai	Afro Samurai / Ninja Ninja		
2010	Heroes of Newerth	Samuel Jackson announcer	Unique read lines in purchasable pack	
2010	Iron Man 2	Nick Fury	Likeness	
2011	Lego Star Wars III: The Clone Wars	Mace Windu	Likeness	
2014	Disney Infinity: Marvel Super Heroes	Nick Fury	Likeness	
2015	Disney Infinity 3.0	Nick Fury	Likeness	
2021	Marvel Super War	Nick Fury	Downloadable announcer	
2021	Grand Theft Auto: The Trilogy – The Definitive Edition	Officer Frank Tenpenny	Archival recordings Remaster of Grand Theft Auto: San Andreas only	
2025	Fortnite	Mace Windu	Likeness	
2025	Fortnite	Jules Winnfield	Likeness	

== Audiobooks ==
Table featuring audiobooks with Samuel L. Jackson
Year	Title	Ref.
2011	Go the Fuck to Sleep	
2012	A Rage in Harlem	

== See also ==
- List of awards and nominations received by Samuel L. Jackson
