= List of awards and nominations received by Samuel L. Jackson =

Samuel L. Jackson awards and nominations
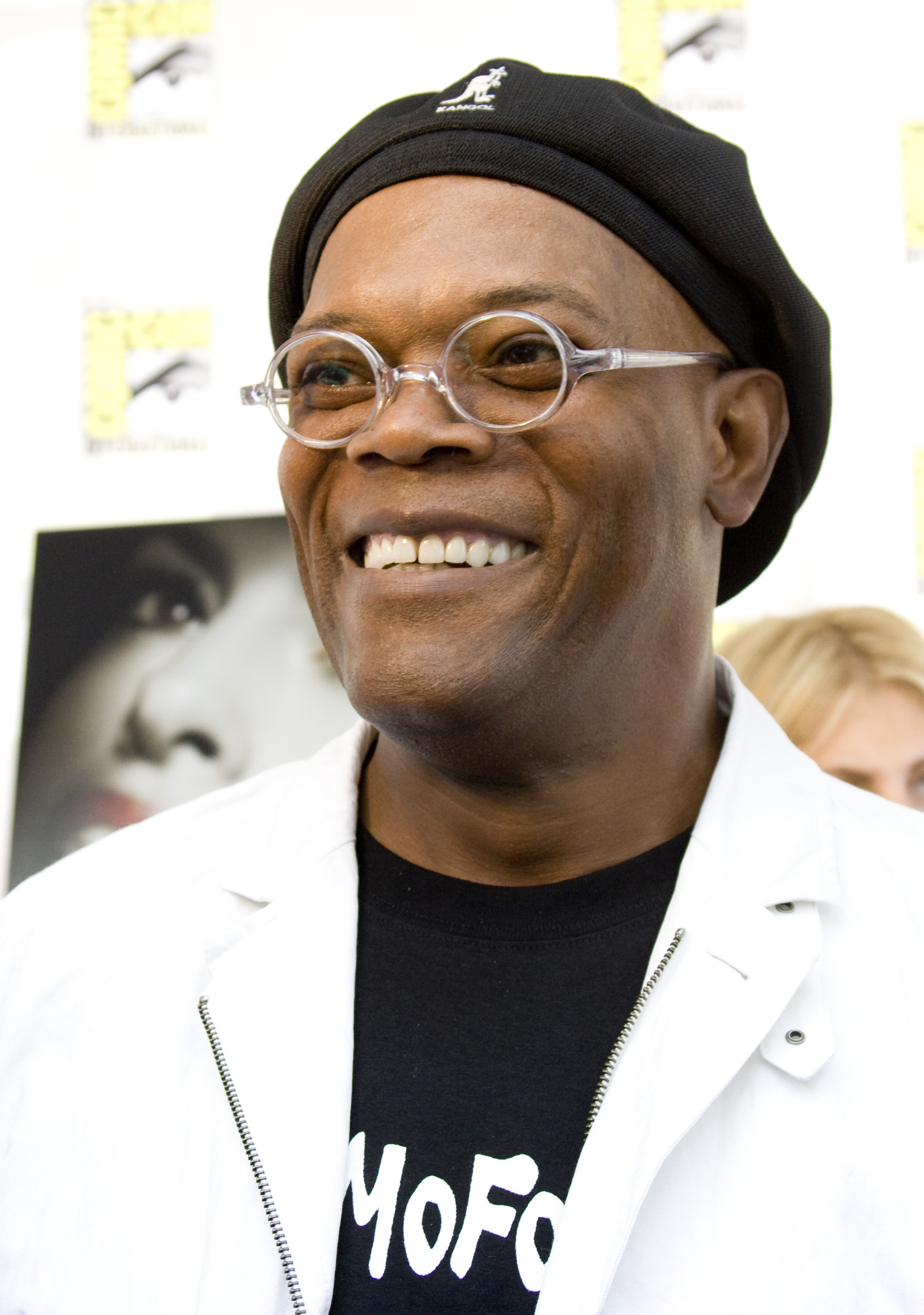
- Jackson at the 2008 San Diego Comic-Con
Awards and nominations
Award	Wins	Nominations
Academy Awards	1	2
BAFTA Awards	1	1
Black Reel Awards	1	6
Golden Globe Awards	0	4
NAACP Image Awards	4	11
Primetime Emmy Awards	0	1
Tony Awards	0	2

Totals (Note: Certain award groups do not simply award one winner. They acknowledge several different recipients, have runners-up, and have third place. Since this is a specific recognition and is different from losing an award, runner-up mentions are considered wins in this award tally. For simplification and to avoid errors, each award in this list has been presumed to have had a prior nomination.)
- Wins: 7
- Nominations: 24

The following is a list of certain awards and nominations received by the actor Samuel L. Jackson.

Jackson received the Academy Honorary Award for lifetime achievement in 2022. For his role in Pulp Fiction, he won the BAFTA Award for Best Actor in a Supporting Role, the Independent Spirit Award for Best Male Lead, and received nominations for the Academy Award for Best Supporting Actor and the corresponding Golden Globe Award and Screen Actors Guild Award. He has also won the Silver Bear for Best Actor for Jackie Brown at the Berlin International Film Festival, and the Best Actor Award for Jungle Fever at the Cannes Film Festival. In 2023, he received a nomination for the Tony Award for Best Featured Actor in a Play for the Broadway production The Piano Lesson.

Jackson has also received nominations for his role as a producer, including the Primetime Emmy Awards and Tony Awards.

== Major associations ==
=== Academy Awards ===
Year	Category	Nominated work	Result	Ref.
1995	Best Supporting Actor	Pulp Fiction	Nominated	
2021	Honorary Academy Award	—N/a	Honored	

=== BAFTA Awards ===
Year	Category	Nominated work	Result	Ref.
British Academy Film Awards
1995	Best Actor in a Supporting Role	Pulp Fiction	Won	

=== Berlin International Film Festival ===
Year	Category	Nominated work	Result	Ref.
1998	Silver Bear for Best Actor	Jackie Brown	Won	

=== Cannes Film Festival ===
Year	Category	Nominated work	Result	Ref.
1991	Best Actor	Jungle Fever	Won	

=== Cairo International Film Festival ===
Year	Category	Nominated work	Result	Ref.
2009	Lifetime Achievement Award		Honored	

=== Golden Globe Awards ===
Year	Category	Nominated work	Result	Ref.
1995	Best Actor in a Miniseries or Motion Picture – Television	Against the Wall	Nominated	
1995	Best Supporting Actor – Motion Picture	Pulp Fiction	Nominated	
1997	Best Supporting Actor – Motion Picture	A Time to Kill	Nominated	
1998	Best Actor in a Motion Picture – Musical or Comedy	Jackie Brown	Nominated	

=== Independent Spirit Awards ===
Year	Category	Nominated work	Result	Ref.
1995	Best Male Lead	Pulp Fiction	Won	
1998	Best First Feature Film	Eve's Bayou	Won	
1998	Best Supporting Male	Hard Eight	Nominated	
2011	Best Supporting Male	Mother and Child	Nominated	

=== Primetime Emmy Awards ===
Year	Category	Nominated work	Result	Ref.
2009	Outstanding Animated Program	Afro Samurai: Resurrection	Nominated	

=== Screen Actors Guild Awards ===
Year	Category	Nominated work	Result	Ref.
1995	Outstanding Performance by a Male Actor in a Supporting Role	Pulp Fiction	Nominated	

=== Tony Awards ===
Year	Category	Nominated work	Result	Ref.
2023	Best Featured Actor in a Play	The Piano Lesson	Nominated	
2024	Best Revival of a Play	Purlie Victorious	Nominated	

== Miscellaneous awards ==
=== Annie Awards ===
Year	Category	Nominated work	Result	Ref.
2005	Outstanding Voice Acting in a Feature Production	The Incredibles	Nominated	

=== Audie Awards ===
Year	Category	Nominated work	Result	Ref.
2007	Audiobook of the Year	The Bible Experience (New Testament)	Won	
2007	Inspirational/Spiritual	The Bible Experience (New Testament)	Won	
2008	Audiobook of the Year	The Bible Experience (Old Testament)	Nominated	
2008	Inspirational/Spiritual	The Bible Experience (Old Testament)	Won	
2008	Multi-Voiced Performance	The Bible Experience (Old Testament)	Won	
2010	Audiobook of the Year	Nelson Mandela's Favorite African Folktales	Won	
2010	Multi-Voiced Performance	Nelson Mandela's Favorite African Folktales	Won	
2012	Audiobook of the Year	Go the Fuck to Sleep	Nominated	
2012	Humor	Go the Fuck to Sleep	Nominated	
2013	Fiction	A Rage in Harlem	Nominated	

=== Black Reel Awards ===
Year	Category	Nominated work	Result	Ref.
2001	Best Actor	Shaft	Nominated	
2002	Best Actor	The Caveman's Valentine	Nominated	
2003	Best Actor	Changing Lanes	Nominated	
2005	Best Actor	Coach Carter	Nominated	
2010	Best Supporting Actor	Mother and Child	Nominated	
2013	Best Supporting Actor	Django Unchained	Won	

=== Capri Hollywood International Film Festival ===
Year	Category	Nominated work	Result	Ref.
2015	Best Actor	The Hateful Eight	Won	

=== MTV Movie Awards ===
Year	Category	Nominated work	Result	Ref.
1994	Best On-Screen Duo (shared with John Travolta)	Pulp Fiction	Nominated	
2013	Best WTF Moment (shared with Jamie Foxx)	Django Unchained	Won	
2013	Best On-Screen Duo (shared with Leonardo DiCaprio)	Django Unchained	Nominated	
2016	Best Villain	Kingsman: The Secret Service	Nominated	

=== NAACP Image Awards ===
Year	Category	Nominated work	Result	Ref.
1997	Outstanding Actor in a Motion Picture	The Long Kiss Goodnight	Nominated	
1997	Outstanding Supporting Actor in a Motion Picture	A Time to Kill	Won	
1998	Outstanding Actor in a Motion Picture	Eve's Bayou	Nominated	
1999	Outstanding Actor in a Motion Picture	The Negotiator	Nominated	
2001	Outstanding Actor in a Motion Picture	Shaft	Nominated	
2003	Outstanding Actor in a Motion Picture	Changing Lanes	Nominated	
2004	Outstanding Actor in a Motion Picture	S.W.A.T.	Nominated	
2006	Outstanding Actor in a Motion Picture	Coach Carter	Won	
2011	Outstanding Supporting Actor in a Motion Picture	Mother and Child	Won	
2013	Outstanding Supporting Actor in a Motion Picture	Django Unchained	Won	
2025	Outstanding Supporting Actor in a Motion Picture	The Piano Lesson	Nominated	

=== Saturn Awards ===
Year	Category	Nominated work	Result	Ref.
2015	Best Supporting Actor	Captain America: The Winter Soldier	Nominated	
2016	Best Actor	The Hateful Eight	Nominated	

=== Teen Choice Awards ===
Year	Category	Nominated work	Result	Ref.
2008	Choice Movie Villain	Jumper	Nominated	
2019	Choice Movie Actor: Action	Captain Marvel	Nominated	

=== Film critic awards ===
Year	Category	Nominated work	Result
1991	Kansas City Film Critics Circle Award for Best Supporting Actor	Jungle Fever	Won
1991	New York Film Critics Circle Award for Best Supporting Actor	Jungle Fever	Won
1991	Chicago Film Critics Association Award for Best Supporting Actor	Jungle Fever	Nominated
1994	Society of Texas Film Critics Award for Best Actor	Pulp Fiction	Won
1994	National Society of Film Critics Award for Best Actor	Pulp Fiction	Nominated
1994	National Society of Film Critics Award for Best Supporting Actor	Pulp Fiction	Nominated
1994	New York Film Critics Circle Award for Best Supporting Actor	Pulp Fiction	Nominated
1994	Chicago Film Critics Association Award for Best Actor	Pulp Fiction	Nominated
1997	San Diego Film Critics Society's Body of Work Award	One Eight Seven	Won
1997	San Diego Film Critics Society's Body of Work Award	Eve's Bayou	Won
1997	San Diego Film Critics Society's Body of Work Award	Jackie Brown	Won

=== Miscellaneous awards ===
Year	Category	Nominated work	Result	Ref.
1997	Satellite Award for Best Supporting Actor – Motion Picture	Eve's Bayou	Nominated	
2004	Spike Video Game Award for Best Performance by a Male	Grand Theft Auto: San Andreas	Won	
2008	IGN Award for Best Cameo	Iron Man	Won	
2011	IGN Award for Favorite Cameo	Thor	Nominated	

== Inductions ==
Year	Category	Nominated work	Result	Ref.
2006	American Academy of Achievement Golden Plate Award	The Arts	Won	

== See also ==
- Samuel L. Jackson filmography
