= Ricardo Cortés (illustrator) =

Visual artist and author

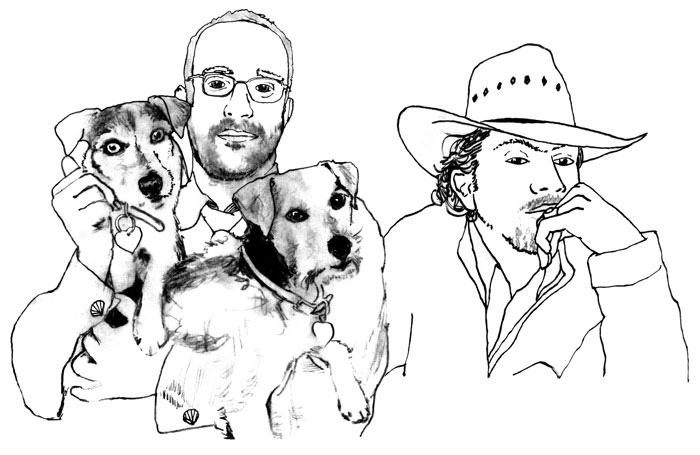
A self-portrait of Cortes (right), with F. Bowman Hastie, with whom he published I Don't Want To Blow You Up!

Ricardo Cortés (born 1973) is an American illustrator and author. He has written and illustrated a children's book about marijuana: It's Just a Plant. He illustrated Go the Fuck to Sleep, Adam Mansbach's bedtime story for adults, and I Don't Want To Blow You Up!, a coloring book with pages devoted to famous Muslims who are not terrorists.

A 2011 project is to raise money to distribute an illustrated booklet about jury nullification (under the title Jury Independence Illustrated). The intention is to educate the public (specifically, potential jurors) about their ability to acquit a defendant because the jury (or juror) disagrees with the law in question. A grant of $2,000 has been provided by the Department of Cultural Affairs' Greater New York Arts Development.

Cortes graduated from Columbia College of Columbia University in 1995.

== Selected bibliography ==
- Cortés, Ricardo; Rosenbaum, Marsha (2005). It's just a plant : a children's story about marijuana (1st ed.). Brooklyn, N.Y.: Magic Propaganda Mill. ISBN 978-0-9760117-0-5. OCLC 58481877.
- Harris, Devon; Cortés, Ricardo (2008). Yes, I can! : the story of the Jamaican bobsled team. Congers, NY: Waterhouse Pub. ISBN 978-0-9764082-5-3. OCLC 229031466.
- Cortés, Ricardo; Hastie, F. Bowman (2008). I Don't Want To Blow You Up! A Children's Coloring Book on Terrorism and Fear. Magic Propaganda Mill. ISBN 978-0-9760117-4-3. OCLC 213448527.
- Mansbach, Adam; Cortés, Ricardo (2011). Go the Fuck to Sleep. Akashic Books. ISBN 978-1-61775-025-0. OCLC 709680954.
