= I Don't Want to Blow You Up! =

Educational coloring book

I Don't Want To Blow You Up!
- Book cover
- Author: Ricardo Cortés; F. Bowman Hastie III
- Cover artist: Ricardo Cortés
- Language: English
- Genre: Coloring book
- Publisher: Magic Propaganda Mill Books
- Publication date: 2008
- Publication place: United States
- Media type: Print
- Pages: 32
- ISBN: 9780976011743

I Don't Want To Blow You Up! is an educational coloring book by Ricardo Cortés and F. Bowman Hastie III. The book explains to children that people having different looks or different-sounding names does not mean they are terrorists (i.e., having the intention of blowing the reader up). I Don't Want To Blow You Up! depicts thirteen people (eleven real, two fictional), with biographical information, and a declaration that they do not want to blow up the reader. The book received mixed criticism, including the authors' receiving a cease-and-desist letter on behalf of Kareem Abdul-Jabbar for his unauthorized depiction.

== Background ==
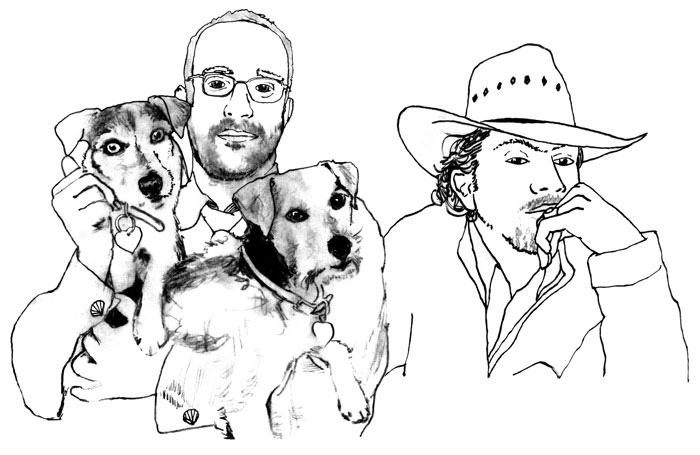
Hastie (left) and Cortés, as drawn by Cortés

According to the authors, I Don't Want To Blow You Up! was written to teach children to not be afraid of people with names that may be similar to those of terrorists. When Cortés and Hastie began the book they intended to seek permission from everyone depicted in the book (eleven real people and two fictional). Keith Ellison (a Muslim Congressman) declined their request, claiming that as a Congressman he was not allowed to participate. On the advice of their lawyer Cortés and Hastie decided to move forward with the book without consent from the people they were depicting; in the end only four people were asked for consent to use their likeness. The authors believed that consent would not be required because the information is biographical in nature, and they are not introducing any information that is not already known. However, Cortés and Hastie received a "cease-and-desist letter" from Kareem Abdul-Jabbar's lawyers for unauthorized use of the basketball player's likeness.

Cortés has illustrated other works including Go the Fuck to Sleep, and wrote and illustrated a children's book on marijuana, It's Just a Plant. Hastie's other works include a book about Tillamook Cheddar, his pet dog who has gained notoriety as an artist.

== Content ==
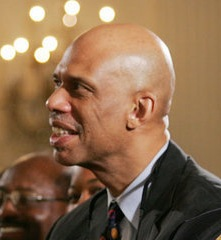
A cease-and-desist letter was sent to the authors on behalf of Kareem Abdul-Jabbar.

The book presents thirteen people who are not terrorists, even though people may assume they are either because of their name or what they look like. They include Kareem Abdul-Jabbar, Nas (Nasir Bin Olu Dara Jones), Tariq Ramadan, Anousheh Ansari, and a child named Osama (who wants to become a judge for the Supreme Court of the United States, despite being frequently asked if he is a terrorist). The book also contains biographical information including confirmation that the subject "doesn't want to blow you up".

== Reception ==
The New York Times referred to the illustrations as "graceful". University of Alberta political science professor Thomas Butko offered criticism, claiming the authors' belief that children stereotype Muslims as terrorists has an adverse effect on the good they are trying to do by publishing the book. The Ottawa Citizen wrote that it was sad that the authors "found it necessary to write a book reassuring children that people who look different are not going to blow them up", and "if the little reader wasn't afraid before, he or she probably is now".

== See also ==
- Islamophobia
