= It's Just a Plant =

2005 book by Ricardo Cortés

- Book cover
- Author: Ricardo Cortés
- Language: English
- Publisher: Self Published
- Publication place: United States
- Media type: Print

It's Just a Plant is a children's book, written, illustrated and published by Ricardo Cortés. It is designed for parents who want to educate their children about marijuana. The book's pro-marijuana legalization message has drawn widespread attention from critics and the media since its publication in January 2005.

== Synopsis ==
The main character is a little girl named Jackie. She is awakened one night in her bedroom by an unusual smell in the air, and she sets out to find its source. She goes to her parents' room and discovers her parents smoking marijuana. When she asks what they're doing, they tell her they are smoking marijuana. Her parents decide to teach her the facts about marijuana.

They travel to the farm where the family buys vegetables. The farmer shows her the variety of crops he grows, including some marijuana plants. He tells her about the history of marijuana, and remarks that many people use the drug, including doctors, teachers, and politicians.

Following the trip to the farm, they visit their family doctor. The doctor tells Jackie that marijuana has many medicinal uses, and that it can ease pain and help people relax. She emphasizes that only adults should use it, and that it is not for children.

Shortly afterward, Jackie sees a group of people smoking marijuana on the street. Two police officers appear and promptly arrest them, to Jackie's bewilderment. The police officers explain that smoking marijuana is against the law, and that's why they are arresting the marijuana smokers. One of the officers tells her that “a small but powerful group decided to make a law against marijuana.” She comes to the conclusion that she wants to vote for the legalization of marijuana when she is older.

== Critical reception ==
The book's controversial message has sparked much criticism in the political community. The author of the book, Ricardo Cortés, was invited to The O'Reilly Factor on the Fox News Channel to discuss the book with Bill O'Reilly. Mark Souder, a Republican representative of the United States Congress from Indiana, heavily criticized the book, saying that it supported marijuana for kids. KATU News, in Portland, Oregon, reported on the story, and covered the reactions of parents to the book outside a local Portland school. The reactions ranged from criticism from some parents, under the reasoning that the book contained more information than a child needed, to support from others, one pointing to her time in the Netherlands, which she believed had a more sophisticated approach to drug use.

However, the book also received positive reviews. Ethan Nadelmann, Executive Director of the Drug Policy Alliance, stated "I highly recommend this little book for students in D.A.R.E., other drug abuse prevention programs, and their teachers and parents. It's a jewel." The New York Post called it "Funny.. offbeat... a riot, with a series of characters explaining the glory of cannabis to a young girl and her mother," giving it 3 1/2 stars out of 5.

== See also ==
- List of books about cannabis
- Go the Fuck to Sleep, another book illustrated by Cortés
- I Don't Want To Blow You Up!, by Cortés as well
