= The Sunset Limited (film) =

2011 American television film based on the play by Cormac McCarthy

- Television release poster
- Genre: Drama
- Based on: The Sunset Limited by Cormac McCarthy
- Screenplay by: Cormac McCarthy
- Directed by: Tommy Lee Jones
- Starring: Tommy Lee Jones; Samuel L. Jackson
- Music by: Marco Beltrami
- Country of origin: United States
- Original language: English

Production
- Executive producer: Tommy Lee Jones
- Producer: Barbara A. Hall
- Cinematography: Paul Elliott
- Editor: Roberto Silvi
- Running time: 91 minutes
- Production company: HBO Films

Original release
- Network: HBO
- Release: February 12, 2011

The Sunset Limited is a 2011 American drama television film directed by Tommy Lee Jones, who also stars with Samuel L. Jackson. It was the duo's second collaboration, after the 2000 film Rules of Engagement. The screenplay was written by Cormac McCarthy, based on his 2006 play of the same name.

The film is about the relationship between a Christian African American who has a positive view of life and a nihilistic Caucasian American with a very negative view.

The film aired on HBO on February 12, 2011, and received generally favorable reviews.

== Plot ==
Black and White converse about White's attempted suicide. White feels as though everything ends up in death, and that his life is minuscule in the throes of time.

From White's point of view, no matter how great someone or something is, all that is created eventually fades away. This is the opposite of what Black believes. He believes that there is a God and that we all must go through the troubles of life to get to paradise (Heaven). By his own account, his story is that of a man who has committed murder and was far away from God, but has now changed.

== Cast ==
- Samuel L. Jackson as Black
- Tommy Lee Jones as White

== Reception ==
On the review aggregator website Rotten Tomatoes, the film has a 68% approval rating based on reviews from 28 critics. The website's consensus reads, "The Sunset Limited's ambition is undercut by arch dialogue and a claustrophobic setting, but Tommy Lee Jones and Samuel L. Jackson's dueling performances bring heft to this battle of wills." On Metacritic, it has a score of 67 out of 100 based on reviews from 15 critics, indicating "generally favorable reviews".

Verne Gay of Newsday praised the film and called it "grim, but a chance to see two magnificent actors at the peak of their powers." Mike Scott of The Times-Picayune called the film "A thinking man's drama that rolls deep, heavy thoughts around and around, trying to puzzle out where the truth lies. Or, indeed, if what we see as the truth is just that: a lie."
