= Adam Mansbach =

American author (born 1976)

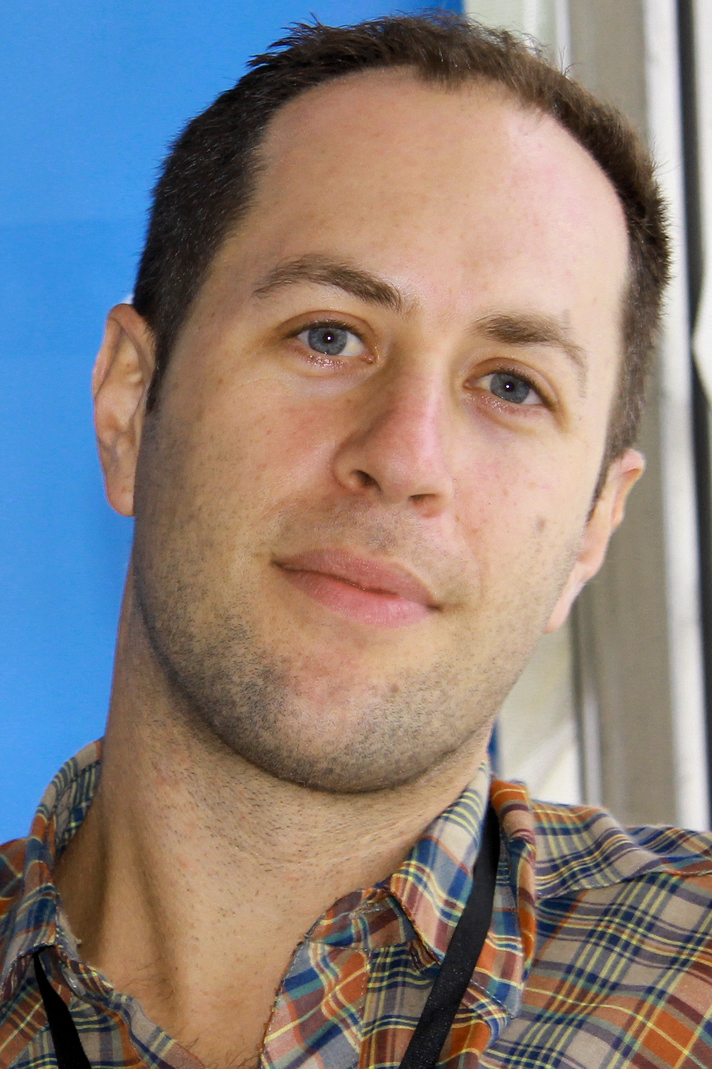
- Mansbach at the 2013 Texas Book Festival
- Born: July 1, 1976 (age 50); Newton, Massachusetts, U.S.
- Education: Columbia University
- Occupation: Author
- Children: 2
- Writing career
- Notable work: Go the Fuck to Sleep

Adam Mansbach (born July 1, 1976) is an American author. He has previously been a visiting professor of literature at Rutgers University-Camden, with their New Voices Visiting Writers program (2009–2011).

== Biography ==
Mansbach graduated from Columbia College in 1998 and received a MFA from Columbia University School of the Arts in 2000.

Mansbach wrote the "children's book for adults" Go the Fuck to Sleep, parodying bedtime stories. Other books Mansbach has written include Angry Black White Boy, a San Francisco Chronicle Best Book of 2005, and The End of the Jews (for which he won the California Book Award for fiction in 2008). Mansbach was the founding editor of the 1990s hip-hop journal Elementary.

His book Stay the Fuck at Home (2020), was written to support awareness of coronavirus self-isolation measures; it has yet to be formally published. The book was read on Jimmy Kimmel Live by actor Samuel L. Jackson.

He lives in Berkeley, California and co-hosts a radio show, "Father Figures".

== Bibliography ==
=== Novels ===
- Shackling Water (2003)
- Angry Black White Boy, Three Rivers Press/Random House (2005)
- The End of the Jews (2009)
- Rage is Back, Viking/Penguin (2013)
- The Dead Run, William Morrow/HarperCollins (2013)
- The Golem of Brooklyn (2023)

=== Graphic novel ===
- Nature Of The Beast: A Graphic Novel Written with Douglas Mcgowan; illustrated by Owen Brozman (2012)

=== Humor ===
- Go the Fuck to Sleep (2011)
- Seriously, Just Go To Sleep (2012)
- You Have to Fucking Eat (2014) ISBN 978-1617753787
- Seriously, You Have to Eat (2015)
- Fuck, Now There Are Two of You (2019)
- A Field Guide to the Jewish People, with Alan Zweibel and Dave Barry (2019)
- Go the F**k to College (2026)

=== Poetry ===
- genius b-boy cynics getting weeded in the garden of delights (2001)
- I Had a Brother Once (2021)

=== Screenplay ===
- Barry (2016)

=== Anthology contributions ===
- All The Words Past The Margins, in Born to Use Mics: Reading Nas's Illmatic. Edited by Michael Eric Dyson and Sohail Daulatzai (Basic Civitas Books, 2010)
