= Against the Wall (1994 film) =

American television film by John Frankenheimer

- Directed by: John Frankenheimer
- Written by: Ron Hutchinson
- Produced by: Steven McGlothen
- Starring: Kyle MacLachlan; Samuel L. Jackson
- Cinematography: John R. Leonetti
- Edited by: Lee Percy
- Music by: Gary Chang
- Production company: HBO Pictures
- Distributed by: HBO
- Release date: March 26, 1994
- Running time: 111 minutes
- Country: United States
- Language: English
- Budget: $5.8 million

Against the Wall is a 1994 American action historical drama television film directed by John Frankenheimer, written by Ron Hutchinson, and starring Samuel L. Jackson and Kyle MacLachlan. It aired on HBO on March 26, 1994. The film was nominated for a Golden Globe Award for Jackson and won a Primetime Emmy Award for Frankenheimer.

== Plot ==
The docudrama is a partially fictionalized account of the four-day Attica Prison riot in 1971 at the Attica Correctional Facility, where prisoners took over much of state prison to protest inhumane conditions. The movie is focused on rookie Corrections Officer Michael Smith (Kyle MacLachlan) and inmate Jamaal X (Samuel L. Jackson) who develop a wary friendship with each other. It is largely told through Smith, who was shot four times, and based on Smith's testimony. Jamaal X is based on several inmates, including the inmate Smith credits with saving his life.

The film opens with a montage of news footage from the late 1960s and early 1970s, including the assassination of Robert F. Kennedy, students killed at the Kent State shootings and the Watts riots. The movie then shows the quiet streets of Attica, New York, and a 22-year-old Smith in a barber shop getting his long hair cut. Smith is an expectant father who decided to become a corrections officer because of the pay. After the haircut, he goes to start his new job at the prison where black militant Jamaal X also arrives. The film shows the first day of the two men, cross-cutting between them. The terrible prison conditions are revealed. Corrections officers treat the prisoners abusively, with violence and needless strip searches, and basic needs like functioning toilets are ignored. The spirit of the Vietnam war protests is influencing the prisoners to seek recognition of their human rights.

Smith begins hearing of complaints of degrading conditions from increasingly politicized prisoners, particularly Jamaal X, a Muslim leader prominent in the fight for prisoner rights. Smith is portrayed as the only officer who treats the inmates with respect and his occasional signs of sympathy for the prisoners make his co-workers suspicious of him. The seasoned corrections officers, like Lieutenant Weisbad, do not allow challenges to their methods of complete, and often humiliating, control. Ultimately Smith's alliance with Jamaal saves his life.

Initially Smith allows himself to dehumanize the prisoners, cooperating with the inhumane treatment of the prisoners as he obeys the orders of his supervisors, even if it goes against his morals. His wife Sharon (Anne Heche) expresses disappointment and contempt when she tells him "You're changing!" However, Smith loses the willingness to follow orders during the uprising, after he is beaten by prisoners in the metal shop he supervises. Several prisoners led by the psychopath Chaka are able to overwhelm the officers and take them hostage when a gate malfunctions. Jamaal protects the officers from Chaka and the other sadists, recognizing they will lose the ability to negotiate with government officials if the hostages are killed.

Smith refuses to humiliate himself in exchange for basic needs unlike the other captured officers. He tells his puzzled co-workers, "I wasn't a guard long enough to learn how to be a prisoner." Jamaal comes to respect Smith for his non-conformity and considers him to be a kindred spirit. Jamaal recruits Smith to speak to a news crew, to testify that the hostages have not been tortured or killed. As the news conference, Smith hints to Jamaal that he cares more about his own dignity than the approval of others, an attitude he did not show prior to the crisis. However, New York's governor ends negotiations on the fifth day of the uprising and orders a raid by law enforcement officials and soldiers. Inmates and their hostages are fired at indiscriminately as their vision is impaired by tear gas. Chaka and Lt. Weisbad are among those killed. Smith is shot several times in the stomach by a friend who is a New York State Police officer. Jamaal is wounded by a stray bullet.

The statistics in the film's epilogue convey its importance to the present. The U.S. prison population had risen 300 percent since the uprising, surpassing South Africa as the biggest per capita in the world, and this was likely to worsen with the three strikes law. Forty states were currently cited by the courts for overcrowding or other inhumane conditions.

== Cast ==
- Kyle MacLachlan as Corrections Officer Michael Smith
- Samuel L. Jackson as inmate Jamaal X
- Clarence Williams III as inmate Chaka
- Frederic Forrest as Vietnam veteran Corrections Officer Lieutenant Weisbad
- Harry Dean Stanton as Hal Smith, Michael's father and a retired Correction Officer
- Philip Bosco as Corrections Commissioner Russell Oswald
- Tom Bower as Ed, Michael's uncle who works in the prison
- Anne Heche as Sharon Smith, Michael's wife
- Carmen Argenziano as Mancusi
- Peter Murnik as Jesse
- Steve Harris as Cecil
- David Ackroyd as William Kunstler
- Danny Trejo as Ramirez
- Denis Forest as Denny

== Production ==
The film had a 31-day shooting schedule and $5.8 million budget. The film was filmed in Tennessee State Penitentiary near Nashville, Tennessee and in Clarksville, Tennessee in the spring of 1993. Michael Smith, who never worked in a prison again, was located with the help of private investigators. Former inmates who were present during the riot were cast as extras.

MacLachlan spent hours talking to Smith to prepare for the role. Smith was originally invited to consult for a few days but stayed for the duration of the filming. Jackson drew on his own experience as an activist at Morehouse College in the 1960s, read books, and watched the TV series Eyes on the Prize to prepare for the role of Jamaal X. Williams prepared for the role of Chaka by watching documentary footage of the riot.

== Critical reception ==
The film received almost unanimous acclaim from critics when it had its television premiere. Critics felt the film was compelling and praised the cast for its performance. The Chicago Tribune praised the "finely drawn characters" in Ron Hutchinson's script.

== Historical accuracy ==
Although the prisoners were discontented with the ghastly prison conditions, the unplanned uprising began with a misunderstanding. On Sept. 8, 1971, a prisoner had been accused of hitting an officer. The next morning, after more prisoner infractions and a miscommunication among officers, a group of prisoners were locked in a tunnel connecting different parts of the prison. Believing that officers were coming to beat them up in reprisal, the prisoners attacked the officers in the tunnel and some attacked each other. Prisoners in other parts of the facility figured out what was happening and began to arm themselves e.g. with two-by-fours, chair legs, etc. When the prisoners in the tunnel burst out, the other inmates were taking over the prison. They created a society, with some rules by consensus and elected leaders. Observers like radical defense lawyer William M. Kunstler, The New York Times columnist Tom Wicker, and Bobby Seale, chairman of the Black Panther Party, were invited to inspect prison conditions and monitor negotiations. The observers took on the role of mediators, relaying demands which included amnesty from reprisals and basic rights.

The prison uprising ended on September 13, 1971, when 1,000 New York state troopers, sheriff's deputies, correction officers and members of the National Guard under the order of Governor Nelson Rockefeller to fire at will, raided the prison and killed 29 inmates and 10 officers who were being held hostage. Rockefeller, who wanted to be president, had decided not to go to the prison to broker a peaceful resolution as the inmates and their negotiators had asked. Although agreement appeared near on many of the inmates' demands, the assault was approved when negotiations over amnesty had stalled and there were concerns for the safety of the hostages. Some prisoners beat up their least favorite officers. One officer, William Quinn, died early in the uprising after a blow to the head; he fell and was trampled. After that, officers taken hostage were treated well. After a helicopter sprayed a cloud of tear gas, troopers shot indiscriminately some 2,000 rounds of ammunition. After the shooting stopped, scores of prisoners were beaten and tortured, hundreds of whom were seriously wounded and initially denied medical care; the identity of the person who shot Michael Smith has not been revealed. The brutalization of inmates continued long after the re-taking of the prison.

== Bibliography ==
- Armstrong, Stephen B. (August 31, 2007). Pictures About Extremes: The Films of John Frankenheimer. McFarland. ISBN 9780786431458.
