= The Sunset Limited (play) =

2006 play by Cormac McCarthy

- Original language: English
- Written by: Cormac McCarthy
- Characters: White; Black
- Genre: Literature
- Setting: An apartment in New York City

Premiere
- Date: May 18, 2006
- Place: Steppenwolf Theatre

The Sunset Limited is a play by American writer Cormac McCarthy. McCarthy's second published play, it was first produced by the Steppenwolf Theatre in Chicago on May 18, 2006, and it traveled to New York City later that same year. The play was published in a paperback edition about the same time that it opened in New York. Some consider it to be more a novel than a true play, partly because of its subtitle, "A Novel in Dramatic Form".

== Plot ==
The play involves only two nameless characters, designated "White" (originally played by Austin Pendleton) and "Black" (originally played by Freeman Coffey), their respective skin colors. Offstage, just before the play begins, Black saves White from throwing himself in front of a train. The title, The Sunset Limited, is derived from the name of a passenger train that travels from New Orleans to Los Angeles. All of the action takes place in Black's sparse apartment, where the characters go (at the behest of Black) after their encounter on the platform. Black is an ex-convict and an evangelical Christian. White is an atheist and a professor. They debate the meaning of human suffering, the existence of God, and the propriety of White's attempted suicide.

== Critical reception ==
Critics from the two major newspapers in the two major cities in which the play has opened both noted concerns about the genre of the work.

The Chicago Tribune critic, Chris Jones, notes that the play is hardly traditional theater, because dialogue rather than action drives the story, yet McCarthy's language is so rich that it makes up for the lack of incident. "Now if only McCarthy would write an actual play," Jones writes. The New York Times calls the play "a poem in celebration of death," yet the play's paperback version (as if anticipating the criticism) includes the intriguingly suggestive subtitle "a novel in dramatic form", which raises many questions about the work's proper genre.

== Adaptation ==
The play was adapted by the playwright for a film version directed and executive-produced by Tommy Lee Jones; it premiered on HBO in February 2011. Jones also stars, opposite Samuel L. Jackson.
