= Go the Fuck to Sleep =

2011 book by Adam Mansbach

- Book cover
- Author: Adam Mansbach
- Illustrator: Ricardo Cortés
- Language: English
- Genre: Children's literature, black comedy
- Publisher: Akashic Books
- Publication date: June 14, 2011
- Publication place: United States
- Media type: Hardcover
- Pages: 32
- ISBN: 978-1-61775-025-0
- Followed by: Seriously, Just Go to Sleep; You Have to Fucking Eat; Seriously, You Have to Eat; Fuck, Now There Are Two Of You; Go the Fuck to College

Go the Fuck to Sleep is a satirical picture book written by American author Adam Mansbach and illustrated by Ricardo Cortés. Described as a "children's book for adults", it reached No. 1 on Amazon.com's bestseller list a month before its release, thanks to an unintended viral marketing campaign during which booksellers forwarded PDF copies of the book by e-mail.

== Background ==
Go the Fuck to Sleep is written in the style of classic children's bedtime stories, but geared towards exasperated parents rather than children. When Adam Mansbach's daughter, Vivien, was 3 years old, she would take up to four hours to fall asleep. Exhausted and exasperated, one night Mansbach posted a note on Facebook, "Look out for my forthcoming children’s book, Go the Fuck to Sleep". Following his post, friends of Mansbach responded enthusiastically, so much that Mansbach began writing what was then only a hypothetical book. Mansbach had the illustrations for the picture book done by a friend, illustrator Ricardo Cortés (a contributor to The New York Times), and approached Akashic Books, a book publisher from New York.

== Summary ==
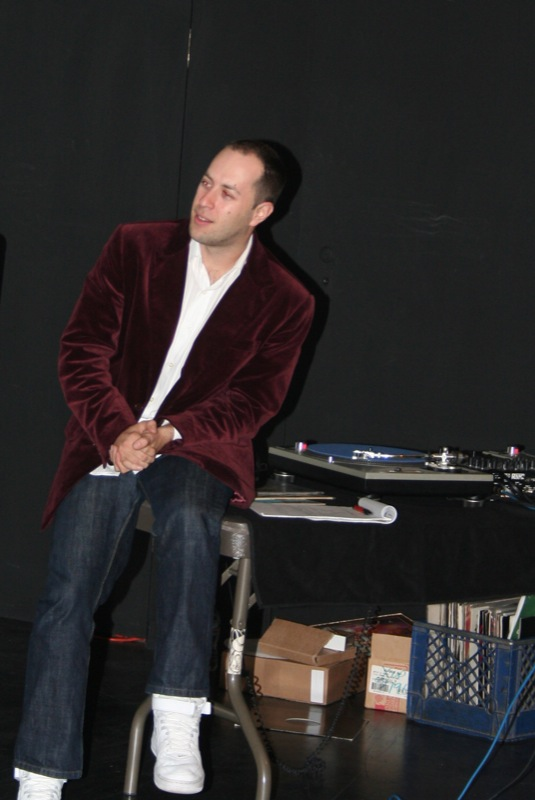
Adam Mansbach, author of Go the Fuck to Sleep, in 2007

A father desperately tries to get his child to sleep by using imagery of various creatures going to bed, such as cats, whales, eagles, and lions. As the book progresses, the father becomes more and more upset, even decrying himself as a parent, before falling asleep himself. When he awakens, he finds his child peacefully sleeping and quietly exits to watch a film with his wife. Unfortunately, a beep from the microwave jolts the child awake, and the cycle begins again.

== Publication history ==
Go the Fuck to Sleep was subject to an unintended viral marketing campaign after PDF copies of the book, presumably from advance copies sent to booksellers, were distributed via email. While the book was originally scheduled for release in October 2011, by the end of April the book had hit No. 2 on Amazon.com's bestseller list, and by May 12 the book was No. 1. In the meantime, the publishing date was moved up to June, and the publisher increased its first printing to 150,000 copies. Akashic, which acknowledged the importance of social media in popularizing the book ("it's a miracle from the heavens for us"), is trying to prevent copyright infringement of the book. The book's title on the cover had the letters "uc" in the word "fuck" hidden by a full moon, while the book's text includes the full word. The rights for the United Kingdom and the Commonwealth were acquired by Canongate. The film rights have been optioned by Fox 2000.

The audiobook company Audible.com published an audiobook version of Go the Fuck to Sleep, narrated by Samuel L. Jackson. The CD's total running time is just over 7 minutes, which includes an unabridged reading of the book by Jackson, a brief introductory monologue by Jackson explaining why he decided to record the book, and approximately 2 minutes' worth of introductory and legal matter (spoken copyright notice, etc.). The actual reading of the manuscript by Jackson runs approximately 4 1/2 minutes. It was a finalist for the 2012 Audie Award for Audiobook of the Year and Audie Award for Humor.

The book was translated into many other languages, and in February 2014, it was announced on Facebook and in other sources the book would receive a translation into Jamaican patois, entitled Go de Rass to Sleep.

== Themes ==
According to Mansbach, the frustrations he wrote about "are not permissible to talk about. We're not completely honest because we don't want to be bad parents." Macy Halford, writing for The New Yorker, said this frustration elicited a response peculiar to modern parents:

Whatever the cause, it is definitely the case that, when faced with a kid who refuses to go to sleep, we get annoyed, like all parents before us, but, rather than just abandoning the child to the dark and telling it that it can go to sleep or stay awake as it likes but it is staying in the bed until morning (remember Proust at the opening of Swann’s Way?), we sit there with it, reading to it and singing to it and distracting it with swirling night lights until it decides it feels like going to sleep, all the while thinking to ourselves, Go the fuck to sleep, kid.

According to Mark Rotella, an editor at Publishers Weekly (and father of two), this is one of the books "that are less earnest about raising your child. They help parents step back and laugh at themselves a bit ... It's more like a parenting book for when the parent is inconsolable in the middle of night and frustrated." The publisher for the UK and the Commonwealth, Canongate, likewise pointed to the book as a parents' book: "This book perfectly captures the familiar and unspoken tribulations of putting your child down for the night. In the process, it opens up a conversation about parenting, charming and enraging as it can be, and chimes a note of solidarity with tired parents everywhere."

== Reception ==
Positive initial response to the Facebook posts was matched by positive criticism from reviewers. The New Yorker's Halford commented, "The book is super funny, and the art, by Ricardo Cortés, is perversely sweet, so sweet and genuine that it made me cringe". Some of the reviewers chimed in from experience, as did Sarah Western Balzer, writing for Here Is the City: "It goes on a bit too long, and by the end, he's kind of in a rage. But then, putting a two- or three-year-old to bed can be totally fucking enraging at times."

The senior vice president and director of Macmillan Children's Publishing announced that she felt the book was a parody of Macmillan's book It's Time to Sleep, My Love by author Eric Metaxas and illustrator Nancy Tillman, saying "Except for the profanity laced throughout, the book has the same kind of lilting lullaby as Eric's, and the art style is the same as Nancy's." Metaxas complained that the book damages the innocence of children's lullabies. Mansbach responded that he was not familiar with the Macmillan book and that his work satirized children's bedtime books in general rather than any particular book.

Go the Fuck to Sleep is 69th on the American Library Association's list of most commonly challenged books in the United States between 2010 and 2019, a list compiled in 2020.

== Parodies ==
In July 2011, Men's Health published a retort to the book: a parody poem written from the child's perspective titled "Get the Fuck Out of My Room" and containing parenting advice.

In its February 2012 issue, MAD Magazine parodied the book in "Stay The Fuck Awake", a reference to reports of air traffic controllers sleeping on the job.

In September 2012, Samuel L. Jackson parodied his own audio narration of the book by appearing in a TV commercial for President Barack Obama's reelection campaign that was entitled "Wake the Fuck Up", also written by Mansbach.

== Celebrity readings ==
As well as the audio book read by Samuel L. Jackson, the book attracted several celebrity readings including by German film director Werner Herzog at the official launch of the book at the New York Public Library. Kevin Pollak, doing a vocal impression of Christopher Walken, read some of the story on Kevin Pollak's Chat Show by viewer request.

As part of a rapidly growing internet meme, the publisher of the book in Australia, Text Publishing, posted a video of Australian actress Noni Hazlehurst reading the book to camera in the style she formerly used on the children's television program Play School. She immediately offered to record a reading of the book after being sent a copy by the publisher.

A Spanish audiobook narrated by George Lopez was released in 2011 by Penguin Audio.

LeVar Burton (known as the former host of the children's television show Reading Rainbow; as Geordi LaForge on Star Trek: The Next Generation; and as Kunta Kinte on Roots) read the book during a 2014 charity live stream event held by the Rooster Teeth podcast.

Actor Jennifer Garner 'lovingly' read the book for Vanity Fair, which became popular on YouTube in March 2016.

Cassandra Lee Morris used her vocal role of Morgana from Persona 5 to read the story in 2018.

== Sequels ==
In September 2014, a sequel, You Have to Fucking Eat, was announced, which was published that November. It is illustrated by Owen Brozman. A third book in the series, Fuck, Now There Are Two of You, has been released on October 1, 2019.

His book Stay the Fuck at Home (2020) was written to support awareness of COVID-19 self-isolation measures; it has yet to be formally published. The book was read on Jimmy Kimmel Live by actor Samuel L. Jackson.

- Go the Fuck to Sleep (2011)
- Seriously, Just Go To Sleep (2012)
- You Have to Fucking Eat (2014) ISBN 978-1617753787
  - Expurgation version: Seriously, You Have to Eat (2015)
- Fuck, Now There Are Two of You (2019)
- Go the Fuck to College (2026)

=== Seriously, Just Go To Sleep ===
As a follow-up, Mansbach wrote a family-friendly version of the book called Seriously, Just Go To Sleep. Whereas the original was a parody of a children's book written expressly for adults, Seriously, Just Go To Sleep is a real children's book for a parent to read to their child, and the word "fuck" was replaced by the parent in the story expressing frustration with the stubborn child in a more G-rated way. For example, "I know you're not thirsty, that's bullshit. Stop lying. Lie the fuck down, my darling, and sleep" was changed to "I know you're not thirsty. You just had a drink. Stop goofing around now, and sleep."

== See also ==
- It's Just a Plant, a book written and illustrated by Cortés
- I Don't Want To Blow You Up!, by Cortés
