= Jungle Fever =

1991 film by Spike Lee

- Theatrical release poster
- Directed by: Spike Lee
- Written by: Spike Lee
- Produced by: Spike Lee
- Starring: Wesley Snipes; Annabella Sciorra; Spike Lee; Ossie Davis; Ruby Dee; Samuel L. Jackson; Lonette McKee; John Turturro; Frank Vincent; Anthony Quinn
- Cinematography: Ernest Dickerson
- Edited by: Sam Pollard
- Music by: Terence Blanchard (score); Stevie Wonder (songs)
- Production company: 40 Acres and a Mule Filmworks
- Distributed by: Universal Pictures
- Release dates: May 16, 1991 (Cannes); June 7, 1991 (United States)
- Running time: 132 minutes
- Country: United States
- Language: English
- Budget: $12.5–14 million
- Box office: $43.9 million

Jungle Fever is a 1991 American romantic comedy-drama film written, produced and directed by Spike Lee. Starring Lee, Wesley Snipes, Annabella Sciorra, Ossie Davis, Ruby Dee, Samuel L. Jackson, Lonette McKee, John Turturro, Frank Vincent, Tim Robbins, Brad Dourif, Giancarlo Esposito, Debi Mazar, Michael Imperioli, and Anthony Quinn, with Halle Berry and Queen Latifah in their film debuts, Jungle Fever explores the beginning and end of an extramarital interracial relationship against the urban backdrop of the streets of New York City in the early 1990s. The film is dedicated to Yusef Hawkins, who died on August 23, 1989.

Jungle Fever premiered in the 44th Cannes Film Festival on May 16, 1991, and was released in the United States on June 7, 1991, by Universal Pictures. The film received positive reviews, with particular praise for Samuel L. Jackson's performance, and was also commercially successful.

== Plot ==
Successful Harlem architect Flipper Purify lives with his wife Drew, a buyer at Bloomingdale's, and their young daughter, Ming. One day at his office, the Mast & Covington architecture firm in mid-town Manhattan, Flipper discovers that an Italian-American woman named Angela "Angie" Tucci from Bensonhurst has been hired as his temp secretary. Initially upset at being the only black person, he relents when senior partners Jerry and Leslie remind him that hiring is based on ability, not race.

Angie's quiet fiancé Paulie Carbone co-manages a corner grocery store/cafe and newsstand and lives with his elderly widowed father Lou. When Paulie arrives to take her out on a date, her brothers Charlie and James antagonize him while he awaits her arrival, threatening physical retribution if he sexually disrespects her. Nevertheless, she urges Paulie to stand up to them as they depart.

After working several late nights together, Flipper and Angie have sex, beginning a tumultuous relationship. The next day, Flipper demands that Jerry and Leslie promote him to partner, but they deny his request, and he resigns, telling his employers that his ideas and work have made the firm very profitable. Eventually, he admits his infidelity to his longtime friend, Cyrus, who criticizes him not for his infidelity towards his wife, but for his affair with a white woman. Cyrus describes his situation as "jungle fever"—an attraction borne of sexualized racial myths rather than love—and Flipper warns him against telling anyone. Angie's friends are equally disparaging when she discloses her liaison.

Drew learns about Flipper's affair through Cyrus's wife Vera and ejects him from their home, forcing him to move in with his father, Southern Baptist preacher the Good Reverend Doctor Purify, and his mother, Lucinda. Later that night, he confronts Cyrus for betraying his trust and insults Vera for snitching, which damages his friendship with Cyrus. Shortly afterwards, Flipper denounces Cyrus, realizing that he will always side with Vera regardless of her actions. Later, Angie devastates Paulie by ending their longstanding engagement, but when she returns, her father Mike, having discovered her relationship with Flipper, severely beats Angie with his belt and kicks her out.

Flipper attempts to reconcile with Drew at her workplace by bringing her flowers, but Drew declines, feeling he was only attracted to her for being half-white. He and Angie move into an apartment in Greenwich Village, where they encounter discrimination for being a mixed-race couple, such as insults from a waitress named LaShawn at a local restaurant, chastisement from the Good Reverend during the couple's dinner with his parents, and financial issues. One night, Flipper is restrained and almost arrested by two policemen who receive a wrongful report that he was attacking Angie. The couple's issues are compounded by Flipper's feelings for his family and her wanting to have children of her own, causing their split. Echoing Cyrus's earlier words, Flipper tells Angie their relationship has been based on sexual racial myths and not love. Angie, although upset, accepts that the affair has ultimately run its course.

Later, Flipper's crack-addicted brother Gator steals and sells Lucinda's TV for drugs. Searching all over Harlem, Flipper eventually locates him in a crack house and exasperatedly disowns him. Soon afterwards, Gator returns to his parents' house to ask for money and, after Lucinda refuses, begins ransacking the home. His erratic behavior ignites an altercation that ends with the Good Reverend angrily disowning him before shooting him with a handgun. Gator collapses and dies in Lucinda's arms as the Good Reverend watches remorsefully.

Meanwhile, Paulie's racist Italian-American friends mock the end of his engagement. Defying his father, Paulie asks one of his customers, a friendly black woman named Orin Goode, out on a date, to her bewilderment. En route to meet Orin, his other customers viciously assault him for attempting an interracial relationship. Although badly beaten, Paulie still arrives for his date with Orin. Mike reluctantly allows Angie to return home, and Flipper, unaware of his own family tragedy, unsuccessfully tries to mend his relationship with Drew. As Flipper leaves from his apartment, a young crack-addicted prostitute propositions him; in response, Flipper embraces her and cries out in anguished torment.

== Cast ==
- Wesley Snipes as Flipper Purify
- Annabella Sciorra as Angela "Angie" Tucci
- Spike Lee as Cyrus
- Ossie Davis as The Good Reverend Doctor Purify
- Ruby Dee as Lucinda Purify
- Samuel L. Jackson as "Gator" Purify
- Lonette McKee as Drew Purify
- John Turturro as Paulie Carbone
- Frank Vincent as Michael "Mike" Tucci
- Anthony Quinn as Lou Carbone
- Halle Berry as Vivian
- Tyra Ferrell as Orin Goode
- Phyllis Yvonne Stickney as Nilda
- Veronica Webb as Vera
- David Dundara as Charlie Tucci
- Michael Imperioli as James Tucci
- Nicholas Turturro as Vinny
- Michael Badalucco as Frankie Botz
- Rick Aiello as Officer Gary Long
- Miguel Sandoval as Officer Mark Ponte
- Debi Mazar as Denise
- Tim Robbins as Jerry
- Brad Dourif as Leslie
- Theresa Randle as Inez
- Pamala Tyson as Angela
- Queen Latifah as Lashawn
- Gina Mastrogiacomo as Louise
- Charlie Murphy as Livin' Large
- Giancarlo Esposito as Homeless Man

== Production ==
A few months after the murder of Yusuf K. Hawkins on August 23, 1989, Spike Lee began conceptualizing Jungle Fever, jotting down ideas and eventually organizing them into scenes on index cards. Subsequently, he commenced writing dialogue with specific actors in mind, envisioning Wesley Snipes, Ossie Davis, and John Turturro for the roles of "Flipper Purify," "The Good Reverend Doctor Purify," and "Paulie Carbone," respectively. Lee reportedly crafted the character "Vinny," Paulie's tough friend, drawing inspiration from Joseph Fama, the teenager responsible for Hawkins' shooting. Additionally, certain aspects of architect Flipper Purify were influenced by cinematographer Ernest Dickerson, Lee's longtime friend and collaborator, who studied architecture at Howard University.

Filming began on August 20, 1990, and wrapped in December 1990, in New York City, primarily in the Harlem and Bensonhurst districts. Additional scenes were shot in Brooklyn's Flatlands neighborhood, Greenwich Village, and at the San Gennaro street festival in Little Italy. The Manhattan offices of the Walker Group served as the backdrop for the fictional architecture firm "Mast & Covington." While expanding on the basic script, a significant portion of the film's dialogue was developed during production. In a scene where "Drew" and her friends discuss Flipper's infidelity, the actresses' performances were largely improvised, creating an emotionally charged conversation that left a strong impression on critics, requiring three days of rehearsal and an entire day to film.

Lee initially filmed a prologue addressing racial issues, but at the encouragement of distributor Universal Pictures, he decided to remove the "offending" scene from the $12.5 million production.

== Themes ==
=== Racism ===
Lee dedicated the film to Yusuf Hawkins. Hawkins was killed on August 23, 1989, in Bensonhurst, New York by Italian-Americans who said the teenager was involved with a white girl in the neighborhood, though he was actually in the neighborhood to inquire about a used car for sale. According to the New York Daily News, "the attack had more to do with race than romance".

=== Drugs ===
In the film, Flipper's brother, Gator, is a crack addict. He is constantly pestering his family members for money. His father has disowned him, but his mother and Flipper still occasionally give him money when he asks.

In an interview with Esquire, Jackson explains that he was able to effectively play the crack addict Gator because he had just gotten out of rehab for his own crack addiction. Because of his personal experience with the drug, Jackson was able to help Lee make Gator's character seem more realistic by helping establish Gator's antics and visibility in the film.

== Music ==
The film's soundtrack was by Stevie Wonder and was released by Motown Records. Although the album was created for the movie, it was released before the movie's premiere in May 1991. It has 11 tracks, all of which are written by Stevie Wonder, except for one. Though some found Wonder's album was unappealing, others believed that it was his best work in years.

The instrumental theme for the film is "Bless the Star" by Terence Blanchard. This theme was used in Mo' Better Blues previously but does not appear on either's soundtrack.

== Release ==
=== Theatrical ===
Jungle Fever premiered at the 44th Cannes Film Festival on May 16, 1991, and was released in the United States on June 7, 1991. It made $5.3 million in its opening weekend and sparked controversy among viewers. On July 7, 1991, the Los Angeles Times published a full page of letters responding to the film and an earlier article by African-American writer Itabari Njeri, who criticized the film for perpetuating myths about interracial relationships. Film critics recognized Lee as a provocateur and praised the performances. The film was also a box office success, grossing 43 million on a budget of 12 million.

== Reception ==
=== Critical response ===
The film garnered mostly positive reviews from critics, with particular praise for Samuel L. Jackson's performance as crack addict Gator, which is often considered to be his breakout role. On Rotten Tomatoes, the film has an approval rating of 81% based on reviews from 52 critics. The site's consensus states: "Jungle Fever finds Spike Lee tackling timely sociopolitical themes in typically provocative style, even if the result is sometimes ambitious to a fault." On Metacritic, the film has a score of 78% based on reviews from 24 critics, indicating "generally favorable" reviews.

Roger Ebert of the Chicago Sun-Times gave it three-and-a-half out of four stars and wrote: "Jungle Fever contains two sequences—the girl talk and the crackhouse visit—of amazing power. It contains humor and insight and canny psychology, strong performances, and the fearless discussion of things both races would rather not face."

=== Accolades ===
- 1991 Cannes Film Festival
  - Best Supporting Actor: Samuel L. Jackson
  - Prize of the Ecumenical Jury (Special Mention)
- Kansas City Film Critics Circle Awards
  - Best Supporting Actor: Samuel L. Jackson
- National Board of Review
  - 10th Best Film of the Year
- New York Film Critics Circle Awards
  - Best Supporting Actor: Samuel L. Jackson
- Political Film Society Human Rights Award
