= Jeremy Robinson bibliography =

Works by American science fiction author Jeremy Robinson

Jeremy Robinson is an American author and novelist. He is known for mixing elements of science, history, and mythology. This is a complete bibliography of works created and co-created by Robinson.

== Non-fiction ==
Title	Co-author	Year	Publisher
"The Difference Between Science Fiction and Fantasy: What Every Screenwriter Needs to Know Before Writing the Next Matrix or Lord of the Rings". (Note: Magazine article.)	—N/a	2003	Script Magazine
The Screenplay Workbook: The Writing Before the Writing	Tom Mungoven	2003	Lone Eagle Press

== Fiction ==
=== Origins series (2005–2010) ===
Origins refers to the first five novels written by Jeremy Robinson.

Book			Audiobook		
Title	Year	Publisher	Narrator	Year	Publisher
The Didymus Contingency	2005	Self-published	R. C. Bray	2012	Breakneck Media
The Didymus Contingency	2015. (Note: Tenth anniversary edition.)	Breakneck Media	R. C. Bray	2012	Breakneck Media
Raising the Past	2006	Self-published	Jeffrey Kafer	2012	Breakneck Media
Antarktos Rising (Note: Narrative expanded into the Antarktos Saga.)	2007	Breakneck Books	R. C. Bray	2013	Breakneck Media
Kronos	2009	Variance Publishing	Jeffrey Kafer	2010	Breakneck Media
Beneath	2010	Breakneck Media	Jeffrey Kafer	2010	Breakneck Media

=== Antarktos Saga (2007–2017) ===
The Antarktos Saga is an expansion of Antarktos Rising and is set on the book's tropical paradise version of Antarctica after the continent's thawing.

The Last Hunter primarily revolves around Solomon Ull Vincent ("Solomon" after Robinson's son, "Ull" after the Norse god Ullr), the first child born on the continent, kidnapped and mentored by a fictional version of Antarctic explorer Belgrave Edward Sutton Ninnis as a hunter for the Nephilim residing in subterranean Antarctica.

The Collected Edition contains the short story "The Children of Antarktos", where an adult Solomon and his wife raise two daughters in the aftermath of the series.

Robinson also co-wrote a follow-up companion novella, which centers around Norah Kainda Vincent, Solomon's younger daughter, who sets out to save her older sister Aquila.

Book					Audiobook		
Volume	Title	Co-writer	Year	Publisher	Narrator	Year	Publisher
0	Antarktos Rising	—N/a	2007	Self-published	R. C. Bray	2012	Breakneck Media
1	The Last Hunter: Descent	—N/a	2011	Breakneck Media	R. C. Bray	2011	Breakneck Media
2	The Last Hunter: Pursuit	—N/a	2011	Breakneck Media	R. C. Bray	2012	Breakneck Media
3	The Last Hunter: Ascent	—N/a	2011	Breakneck Media	R. C. Bray	2012	Breakneck Media
4	The Last Hunter: Lament	—N/a	2012	Breakneck Media	R. C. Bray	2013	Breakneck Media
5	The Last Hunter: Onslaught	—N/a	2012	Breakneck Media	R. C. Bray	2013	Breakneck Media
5.5	"The Children of Antarktos" (Note: Featured in The Last Hunter Collection.)	—N/a	2014	Breakneck Media	R. C. Bray	2014	Breakneck Media
6	The Last Valkyrie	Tori Paquette	2017	Breakneck Media	—N/a		

=== Chess Team universe (2010–2024) ===
The Jack Sigler / Chess Team series follows the adventures of a group of military operators founded to combat mysterious and mythical threats to the world.

Book					Audiobook		
Volume	Title	Co-writer	Year	Publisher	Narrator	Year	Publisher
Jack Sigler Thrillers
0	Prime	Sean Ellis	2012	Breakneck Media	Jeffrey Kafer	2013	Podium Audio
1	Pulse	—N/a	2009	Thomas Dunne Books	Jeffrey Kafer	2010	Audible Studios
2	Instinct	—N/a	2010	Thomas Dunne Books	Jeffrey Kafer	2010	Audible Studios
3	Threshold	—N/a	2011	Thomas Dunne Books	Jeffrey Kafer	2011	Podium Audio
4	Ragnarok	Kane Gilmour	2012	Seven Realms Publishing	Jeffrey Kafer	2012	Podium Audio
5	Omega	Kane Gilmour	2013	Seven Realms Publishing	Jeffrey Kafer	2013	Podium Audio
6	Savage	—N/a	2014	Breakneck Media	Jeffrey Kafer	2024	Podium Audio
7	Cannibal	—N/a	2015	Breakneck Media	Jeffrey Kafer	2024	Podium Audio
8	Empire	Sean Ellis	2016	Breakneck Media	Jeffrey Kafer	2024	Podium Audio
9	Kingdom	Kane Gilmour	2024	Breakneck Media	Jeffrey Kafer	2024	Podium Audio
Chesspocalypse Novellas (occur between Threshold and Ragnarok; also called as Fracture)
1	Callsign: King (Note: Included in Callsign: King — The Brainstorm Trilogy.)	Sean Ellis	2011	Breakneck Media	Jeffrey Kafer	2013	Breakneck Media
2	Callsign: Queen (Note: Included in Callsign: Tripleshot.)	David Wood	2011	Breakneck Media	Jeffrey Kafer	2015	Breakneck Media
3	Callsign: Rook	Edward G. Talbot	2011	Breakneck Media	Jeffrey Kafer	2015	Breakneck Media
4	Callsign: King — Book II: Underworld	Sean Ellis	2011	Breakneck Media	Jeffrey Kafer	2013	Breakneck Media
5	Callsign: Bishop	David McAfee	2011	Breakneck Media	Jeffrey Kafer	2015	Breakneck Media
6	Callsign: Knight (Note: Included in Callsign: Doubleshot.)	Ethan Cross	2011	Breakneck Media	Jeffrey Kafer	2014	Breakneck Media
7	Callsign: Deep Blue	Kane Gilmour	2011	Breakneck Media	Jeffrey Kafer	2015	Breakneck Media
8	Callsign: King — Book III: Blackout	Sean Ellis	2012	Breakneck Media	Jeffrey Kafer	2013	Breakneck Media
Continuum Novellas (occur between Omega and Savage)
1	Guardian	J. Kent Holloway	2014	Breakneck Media	Jeffrey Kafer	2025	Breakneck Media
2	Patriot	J. Kent Holloway	2015	Breakneck Media	Jeffrey Kafer	2025	Breakneck Media
3	Centurion	J. Kent Holloway	2016	Breakneck Media	Jeffrey Kafer	2025	Breakneck Media
Cerberus Group
1	Herculean	—N/a	2016	Breakneck Media	Jeffrey Kafer	2016	Breakneck Media
2	Helios	Sean Ellis	2018	Breakneck Media	Jeffrey Kafer	2018	Breakneck Media
Other
—N/a	Endgame: A Jack Sigler & Chess Team Universe Guidebook	Kane Gilmour	2015	Breakneck Media	—N/a		

=== Jane Harper trilogy (2011–2025) ===
Book				Audiobook		
Volume	Title	Year	Publisher	Narrator	Year	Publisher
1	The Sentinel	2011	47North	Emily Beresford	2013	Brilliance Audio
2	The Raven	2013	47North	Emily Beresford	2013	Brilliance Audio
3	The Host (Note: Introduced in The Sentinel: The Complete Jane Harper Trilogy.)	2025	Breakneck Media	Eva Kaminsky	2025	Podium Audio

=== Nemesis Saga (2012–2023) ===
The Nemesis Saga follows the fictional Homeland Security's fictional Fusion Center-P (Paranormal) and their exploits with the ancient Goddess of Vengeance, the massive Kaiju Nemesis.

Book				Audiobook		
Volume	Title	Year	Publisher	Narrator	Year	Publisher
0	Island 731	2013	Thomas Dunne Books	R. C. Bray	2013	Breakneck Media
1	Project Nemesis	2012	Breakneck Media	Jeffrey Kafer	2013	Breakneck Media
2	Project Maigo	2013	Breakneck Media	Jeffrey Kafer	2014	Breakneck Media
3	Project 731	2014	Breakneck Media	Jeffrey Kafer	2015	Breakneck Media
4	Project Hyperion	2015	Breakneck Media	Jeffrey Kafer	2015	Breakneck Media
5	Project Legion	2016	Breakneck Media	Jeffrey Kafer	2017	Breakneck Media
6	Nemesis	2023	Breakneck Media	R. C. Bray	2023	Podium Audio

=== SecondWorld (2012–2013) ===
Book			Audiobook		
Title	Year	Publisher	Narrator	Year	Publisher
SecondWorld	2012	Thomas Dunne Books	Phil Gigante	2012	Brilliance Audio
Nazi Hunter: Atlantis (Note: Formerly titled as I Am Cowboy.)	2013	Breakneck Media	R. C. Bray	2015	Breakneck Media

=== Infinite Timeline (2013–2023) ===
The Infinite Timeline is a hybrid book series, literary cycle and shared fictional universe written by Robinson and distributed by Breakneck Media. The cycle began in 2013 and concluded in 2023 with thirteen novels. Robinson began writing these novels as stand-alone stories that could co-exist in an ecosystem similar to the Marvel Cinematic Universe formula, combining science fiction, fantasy, horror and thriller with twisted concepts based on several mythologies. There are nine solo novels followed by four crossover events in this series.

Book				Audiobook		
Volume	Title	Year	Publisher	Narrator	Year	Publisher
1	Infinite	2017	Breakneck Media	R. C. Bray	2017	Breakneck Media
2	The Others	2018	Breakneck Media	R. C. Bray	2018	Breakneck Media
3	Flux	2019	Breakneck Media	Jeffrey Kafer	2019	Breakneck Media
4	Tribe	2019	Breakneck Media	R. C. Bray	2019	Breakneck Media
5	NPC	2020	Breakneck Media	R. C. Bray and Jeffrey Kafer	2020	Breakneck Media
6	Exo-Hunter	2020	Breakneck Media	R. C. Bray	2021	Breakneck Media
7	The Dark	2021	Breakneck Media	R. C. Bray	2021	Podium Audio
8	Mind Bullet	2021	Breakneck Media	R. C. Bray	2021	Podium Audio
9	Torment	2013	Breakneck Media	R. C. Bray	2022	Podium Audio
10	Infinite2	2022	Breakneck Media	R. C. Bray	2021	Podium Audio
11	The Order	2022	Breakneck Media	R. C. Bray	2021	Podium Audio
12	Khaos	2022	Breakneck Media	R. C. Bray	2022	Podium Audio
13	Singularity	2023	Breakneck Media	R. C. Bray	2023	Podium Audio

=== Refuge series (2013–2014) ===
The Refuge series revolves around the eponymous fictional small town in New Hampshire as a group of residents is caught in a rapture-like phenomenon that transports the town through a unique trans-dimensional journey, each entry deliberately serialized according to the style of a seasonal TV show format.

Book					Audiobook		
Volume	Title	Co-writer	Year	Publisher	Narrator	Year	Publisher
1	Refuge: Night of the Blood Sky	—N/a	2013	Breakneck Media	Jeffrey Kafer	2014	Breakneck Media
2	Refuge: Darkness Falls	Daniel S. Boucher	2013	Breakneck Media	Jeffrey Kafer	2014	Breakneck Media
3	Refuge: Lost in the Echo	Robert Swartwood	2013	Breakneck Media	Jeffrey Kafer	2014	Breakneck Media
4	Refuge: Ashes And Dust	David McAfee	2013	Breakneck Media	Jeffrey Kafer	2014	Breakneck Media
5	Refuge: Bonfires Burning Bright	Kane Gilmour	2014	Breakneck Media	Jeffrey Kafer	2014	Breakneck Media

=== Hunger trilogy (2015–2023) ===
Book				Audiobook		
Volume	Title	Year	Publisher	Narrator	Year	Publisher
1	Hunger (Note: Written as "Jeremiah Knight".)	2015	Breakneck Media	Jeffrey Kafer	2015	Breakneck Media
2	Feast	2016	Breakneck Media	Jeffrey Kafer	2016	Breakneck Media
3	Famine (Note: Introduced in Hunger: The Complete Trilogy.)	2023	Breakneck Media	Jeffrey Kafer	2023	Podium Audio

=== Good Boys trilogy (2024–2025) ===
Book				Audiobook		
Volume	Title	Year	Publisher	Narrator	Year	Publisher
1	Good Boys: The Lost Tribe	2024	Breakneck Media	Tom Taylorson	2024	Podium Audio
2	Good Boys: Unleashed	2024	Breakneck Media	Tom Taylorson	2024	Podium Audio
3	Good Boys: The Visionary	2025	Breakneck Media	Tom Taylorson	2025	Podium Audio

=== Untitled shared universe (2025–present) ===
Book				Audiobook		
Volume	Title	Year	Publisher	Narrator	Year	Publisher
1	Artifact	2025	Podium Publishing	R. C. Bray	2025	Podium Audio
2	30Seven	2026	Podium Publishing	R. C. Bray	2026	Podium Audio
3	Parallax	2026	Podium Publishing	R. C. Bray	2026	Podium Audio

=== Stand-alone novels ===
Book				Audiobook		
Title	Co-writer	Year	Publisher	Narrator	Year	Publisher
Flood Rising	Sean Ellis	2014	Breakneck Media	Xe Sands	2015	Breakneck Media
Human After All (Note: Formerly titled as Xom-B, Uprising and Freeman.)	—N/a	2014	Thomas Dunne Books	R.C. Bray	2014	Brilliance Audio
MirrorWorld	—N/a	2015	St. Martin's Press	R.C. Bray	2015	Brilliance Audio
Apocalypse Machine	—N/a	2016	Breakneck Media	Jeffrey Kafer	2016	Breakneck Media
Unity	—N/a	2016	Breakneck Media	Julia Farmer	2016	Breakneck Media
The Distance	Hilaree Robinson	2016	Breakneck Media	Jeffrey Kafer	2018	Breakneck Media
Viking Tomorrow	—N/a	2017	Breakneck Media	Jeffrey Kafer	2018	Breakneck Media
Forbidden Island	—N/a	2017	Breakneck Media	Jeffrey Kafer	2018	Breakneck Media
The Divide	—N/a	2018	Breakneck Media	Christa Lewis	2018	Breakneck Media
Space Force	—N/a	2018	Breakneck Media	Jeffrey Kafer	2019	Breakneck Media
Alter	—N/a	2018	Breakneck Media	Luke Daniels	2019	Breakneck Media
Tether	—N/a	2019	Breakneck Media	Jeffrey Kafer	2019	Breakneck Media
Point Nemo	—N/a	2024	Breakneck Media	R. C. Bray	2024	Podium Audio
Settle Down	—N/a	2026	Breakneck Media	R. C. Bray	2026	Podium Audio
Fishbowl	—N/a	2027	Breakneck Media	R. C. Bray	2027	Podium Audio

== Short stories ==
Book			Anthology		
Anthology	Year	Publisher	Narrator	Year	Publisher
Insomnia and Seven More Short Stories	2011	Breackneck Media	Dan Delgado	2019	Podium Audio

=== Insomnia and Seven More Short Stories ===
Short story	Year	Publisher
"Harden's Tree"	2005	AlienSkin Magazine
"Harden's Tree"	2006	Download Tales
"Counting Sheep"	2005	AlienSkin Magazine
"From Above"	2005	Download Magazine
"From Above"	2006	Download Tales
"Insomnia"	2005	Self-published
"The Eater"	2005	Self-published
"Star Crossed Killers"	2005	Self-published
"Hearing Aid"	2005	Self-published
"Dark Seed of the Moon"	2005	Self-published
"Bought and Paid For" (Note: Bonus story character sketch for Scott Sigler's The Crypt.)	2005	Self-published

=== Antarktos Saga ===
Short story	Year	Publisher	Narrator	Year	Publisher
"The Children of Antarktos"	2014	Breackneck Media	R. C. Bray	2014	Breackneck Media

== Guidebooks ==
Guidebook	Year	Publisher
The Zombie's Way: Words of Wisdom for the Recently Undead (Note: Written as "Ike Onsoomyu".)	2011	Breackneck Media
The Ninja's Path: Inspirational Sayings for the Silent Assassin (Note: Written as "Kutyuso Deep".)	2011	Lyons Press
The Otherworldly Journal of Doctor Erasmus Gray	2022	Breackneck Media

== Third-party collaborations ==
Novel	Author	Year	Publisher	Note
Dogs of War (Joe Ledger series, book 9)	Jonathan Maberry	2017	Griffin Press	Jack Sigler guest appearance.

=== Other anthologies ===
Book
Anthology	Year	Publisher
V Wars: Night Terrors	2016	IDW Publishing
MECH: Age of Steel	2017	Ragnarok Publications
Kaiju Rising	2017	Ragnarok Publications
Fearful Fathoms II: Collected Tales of Aquatic Terror	2017	Scarlet Galleon Publications
Predator: If It Bleeds	2017	Titan Books
Joe Ledger: Unstoppable (Jonathan Maberry)	2017	St. Martin's Griffin

== Comics ==
Title	Issue(s)	Creative team	Year
American Gothic Press
Famous Monsters Presents Project Nemesis	6	Matt Frank (artist); Diego Rodriguez and Anthony Diecidue (colorists); Marshall Dillon (letterer)	2015–2016
IDW Publishing
Island 731	3	Kane Gilmour (co-writer); Jeff Zornow (artist)	2016
Godzilla: Rage Across Time	6	Matt Frank (co-writer, artist)	2016

=== Breakneck Comics ===
In 2025, Breakneck Media founded Breakneck Comics, its own comic book imprint, and formed a partnership with Vault Comics (owned by Aethon Books) to publish new comics written and co-written by Robinson.

==== Breakneck Horror Universe (BHU) ====
Breakneck Horror Universe (BHU)
Title	Issues	Artists	Colorist	Letterer	Year
Nectar
Nectar	4	Annapaola Martello and Francesco Francini	Steve Canon	Jim Campbell	2026
Nectar: Night of Sorrows	TBA	TBA	TBA	TBA	2027
The Excommunicated
The Excommunicated	4	Tiago Palma	Manuel Rodriguez	Jim Campbell	2026
The Excommunicated: Vitrael’s Blood	TBA	TBA	TBA	TBA	2027
Other
One Zero Zero One Saves the World	4	Tiago Palma	Manuel Rodriguez	Jim Campbell	2027
Grotesque	TBA	TBA	TBA	TBA	2027

== Other media ==
=== Film ===
- Chess Team film series (planned)

=== Television ===
- Project Nemesis TV series (Sony Pictures Television and Original Film, in development)

=== Video games ===
- Colossal Kaiju Combat: Kaijuland Battles (Sunstone Games, cancelled)
