= R. C. Bray =

American producer and voice actor (born 1977)

R.C. Bray
- Born: Robert Christian Bray; July 28, 1977 (age 49); Chicago, Illinois, United States
- Other name: Bon Shaw
- Education: CT School of Broadcasting, 2003; WCSU CTA Major (Communications/Theatre Arts), 1994-98
- Occupation: Narrator
- Notable work: The Martian; Expeditionary Force
- Website: www.rcbray.com

R. C. Bray (born July 28, 1977, in Chicago) is an American producer and voice actor known for over 250 audiobooks, an Audie Award, Earphones Awards, and Voice Arts Awards winner, Off-Broadway and Edinburgh Fringe Festival performer, and TV and radio commercial narrator.

== Early life ==
Bray began acting in school plays at the age of fourteen years old. He went on to major in theatre at college and later took a job making commercials where he listened to audiobooks during his daily commute.

== Audiobooks ==
Title/Series	Author
The Martian	Andy Weir
After It Happened	Devon C. Ford
Arisen series	Michael Stephen Fuchs
Expeditionary Force series	Craig Alanson
Galaxy's Edge series	Jason Anspach & Nick Cole
Wayward Galaxy series	Jason Anspach & J.N. Chaney
Infinite	Jeremy Robinson
Infinite 2	Jeremy Robinson
The Others	Jeremy Robinson
MirrorWorld	Jeremy Robinson
Island 731 (Nemesis series)	Jeremy Robinson
Xom-B	Jeremy Robinson
The Didymus Contingency	Jeremy Robinson
NPC	Jeremy Robinson
Tribe	Jeremy Robinson
Exo Hunter	Jeremy Robinson
The Last Hunter series	Jeremy Robinson
The Dark	Jeremy Robinson
Mountain Man series	Keith C. Blackmore
The Majestic 311	Keith C. Blackmore
Planetside series	Michael Mammay
Sixth Cycle	Carl Sinclair & Darren Wearmouth
The Fear Saga	Stephen Moss
The Hell Divers series	Nicholas Sansbury Smith
Extinction Cycle: Dark Age	Nicholas Sansbury Smith & Anthony J. Melchiorri
The Retreat series	Craig DiLouie, Stephen Knight & Joe McKinney
These Dead Lands: Immolation	Stephen Knight & Scott Wolf
The Reason You're Alive	Matthew Quick
The Commune series	Joshua Gayou
All Gifts, Bestowed	Joshua Gayou
The Dimension Space series	Dean M. Cole
Sector 64 series	Dean M. Cole
Reaper (short story appearing in Aliens: Bug hunt)	Dan Abnett
Ash Angels series	Brian K. Fuller
Ruins of the Galaxy series	J.N. Chaney & Christopher Hopper
Ruins of the Earth series	Christopher Hopper & J.N. Chaney
Florida Man	Mike Baron
Children of Titan series	Rhett C. Bruno
Crash Dive series	Craig DiLouie
Lost Gods	Brom
The Elementals	Michael McDowell
Forgotten Vengeance series	M.R. Forbes
After It Happened series	Devon C. Ford
Eric Steele series	Sean Parnell
The Supers series	Charley Case & Justin Sloan
Black series	Russell Blake
Cyber series	Matthew Mather
Within These Walls	Ania Ahlborn
The Home Distiller's Workbook	Jeff King

== Awards and honors ==
=== Awards ===
Year	Title	Award	Result	Ref.
2014	Arsonist by Victor Methos	Voice Arts Award for Outstanding Audio Book Narration: Crime & Thriller	Nominee	
2014	The Enemy of My Enemy by Richard Bard	Audie Award for Mystery	Finalist	
2014	The Forgers (2014) by Bradford Morrow	Earphones Award	Winner	
2014	The Forgers (2014) by Bradford Morrow	Listen Up Award for Audiobook Narrator of the Year	Finalist	
2014	The Forgers (2014) by Bradford Morrow	Listen Up Award for Fiction	Finalist	
2014	Lion Plays Rough (2014) by Lachlan Smith	Earphones Award	Winner	
2014	The Martian by Andy Weir	Audie Award for Science Fiction	Finalist	
2014	The Martian by Andy Weir	Voice Arts Award for Outstanding Audio Book Narration: Science Fiction	Nominee	
2014	Yesterday's Gone, Season One by Sean Platt and David Wright	Voice Arts Award for Outstanding Audio Book Narration: Science Fiction, Best Ensemble	Nominee	
2015	Arisen Omnibus Edition by Glynn James and Michael Stephen Fuchs	Voice Arts Award for Outstanding Casting – Audiobook	Nominee	
2015	The Beam: Season 1 by Sean Platt and Johnny B. Truant	Audie Award for Science Fiction	Finalist	
2015	The Beam: Season 2 by Sean Platt and Johnny B. Truant	Voice Arts Award for Outstanding Audio Engineering – Audiobook	Nominee	
2015	Cross My Heart by Abigail Strom	Voice Arts Award for Audiobook Narration – Romance, Best Voiceover	Nominee	
2015	Damoren by Seth Skorkowsky	Audie Award for Paranormal	Finalist	
2015	The Hospital: The First Mountain Man Story by Keith C. Blackmore	Voice Arts Award for Audiobook Narration – Metaphysical, Best Voiceover	Winner	
2015	The Hospital: The First Mountain Man Story by Keith C. Blackmore	Voice Arts Award for Outstanding Production – Audiobook	Nominee	
2015	Hounacier: Valducan (2015) by Seth Skorkowsky	Earphones Award	Winner	
2015	Huntress Moon by Alexandra Sokoloff	Voice Arts Award for Audiobook Narration – Crime & Thriller, Best Voiceover	Winner	
2015	The Martian by Andy Weir	Audie Award for Science Fiction	Winner	
2015	The Martian by Andy Weir	Audie Award for Solo Narration - Male	Finalist	
2015	Suffer the Children by Craig Dilouie	Audie Award for Paranormal	Finalist	
2015	Yesterday's Gone, Season One by Sean Platt and David Wright	Audie Award for Paranormal	Finalist	
2015	Yesterday’s Gone, Season 2 by Sean Platt and David Wright	Voice Arts Award for Science Fiction, Best Voiceover	Nominee	
2016	Hounacier: Valducan (2015) by Seth Skorkowsky	Audie Award for Paranormal	Finalist	
2016	In the Shadow of Frankenstein (2016), edited by Stephen Jones	Earphones Award	Winner	
2017	58 Minutes (1987) by Walter Wager	Voice Arts Award for Audiobook Narration – Fiction, Best Voiceover	Nominee	
2017	Diary of an AssCan by Andy Weir	Voice Arts Award for Audiobook Narration: Short Story Anthology, Best Voiceover	Winner	
2017	The Elementals by Michael McDowell	Audie Award for Paranormal	Finalist	
2017	The Heavens May Fall by Allen Eskens	Audie Award for Mystery	Finalist	
2017	Lost Gods	Voice Arts Award for Audiobook Narration: Fantasy, Best Voiceover	Finalist	
2017	Offbeat: Uncollected Stories	Voice Arts Award for Audiobook Narration: Short Story Anthology, Best Voiceover	Finalist	
2017	The Reason You're Alive (2017) by Matthew Quick	Earphones Award	Winner	
2017	Solitude: Dimension Space by Dean M. Cole	Voice Arts Award for Audiobook Narration – Science Fiction, Best Voiceover	Finalist	
2018	Columbus Day: Expeditionary Force by Craig Alanson	Audie Award for Audiobook of the Year	Finalist	
2018	Battle Stations by Craig DiLouie	Independent Audiobook Award for Literary Fiction	Finalist	
2018	Planetside (2018) by Michael Mammay	Earphones Award	Winner	
2018	Solitude: Dimension Space by Dean M. Cole	Independent Audiobook Award for Science Fiction	Winner	
2019	The Coilhunter Chronicles: Omnibus (2017) by Dean F. Wilson	Earphones Award	Winner	
2019	The Coilhunter Chronicles: Omnibus (2017) by Dean F. Wilson	Independent Audiobook Award for Contemporary Fiction	Winner	
2019	Commune by Joshua Gayou	Independent Audiobook Award for Apocalyptica	Winner	
2019	The Others by Jeremy Robinson	Independent Audiobook Award for Science Fiction	Winner	
2019	Planetside (2018) by Michael Mammay	Audie Award for Science Fiction	Finalist	
2020	Birthday Suit (2019) by Lauren Blakely	Audie Award for Audio Drama	Finalist	
2020	Birthday Suit (2019) by Lauren Blakely	Earphones Award	Winner	
2020	Colonyside (2020) by Michael Mammay	Earphones Award	Winner	
2020	Deathtrap: Expeditionary Force Mavericks by Craig Alanson	Independent Audiobook Award for Science Fiction	Winner	
2020	Extinction Shadow: Extinction Cycle by Nicholas Sansbury Smith and Anthony J. Melchiorri	Independent Audiobook Award for Apocalyptica	Winner	
2020	Extinction Shadow: Extinction Cycle by Nicholas Sansbury Smith and Anthony J. Melchiorri	Independent Audiobook Award for Male Narrator	Finalist	
2020	Dimension Space series by Dean M. Cole	Independent Audiobook Award for Science Fiction Multitude	Finalist	
2020	Tribe by Jeremy Robinson	Independent Audiobook Award for Thriller/Suspense	Finalist	
2021	Florida Man by Mike Baron	Independent Audiobook Award for Humor	Finalist	
2021	The Iceman Always Comes on Tuesday (2019) by James Masse	Earphones Award	Winner	
2021	The Majestic 311 by Keith C. Blackmore	Independent Audiobook Award for Best Male Narrator	Finalist	
2021	The Majestic 311 by Keith C. Blackmore	Independent Audiobook Award for Horror	Finalist	
2021	Mind Bullet (2021) by Jeremy Robinson	Earphones Award	Winner	
2021	Return of the Paladin by Layton Green	Independent Audiobook Award for Fantasy	Finalist	
2021	The Roach by Rhett C. Bruno	Independent Audiobook Award for Thriller/Suspense	Winner	
2021	Ruins of the Galaxy by J.N. Chaney and Christopher Hopper	Audie Award for Science Fiction	Finalist	
2021	The Tinderbox: Soldier of Indira by Lou Diamond Phillips	Independent Audiobook Award for Science Fiction	Finalist	

=== "Best of" lists ===
Year	Title	Award	Ref.
2014	File Under: 13 Suspicious Incidents (2014) by Lemony Snicket	AudioFile Best of Children	
2014	The Martian by Andy Weir	Booklist Editors' Choice: Audio for Adults	
2015	The Martian by Andy Weir	Booklist's Top 10 First Novels on Audio	
2015	The Martian by Andy Weir	Booklist's Top 10 SF/Fantasy/Horror on Audio	
2015	The Martian by Andy Weir	RUSA Listen List	
2017	The Reason You're Alive (2017) by Matthew Quick	AudioFile Best of Fiction	
2018	The Reason You're Alive (2017) by Matthew Quick	RUSA Listen List	
