= Joe Cipriano =

American voice over actor (born 1954)

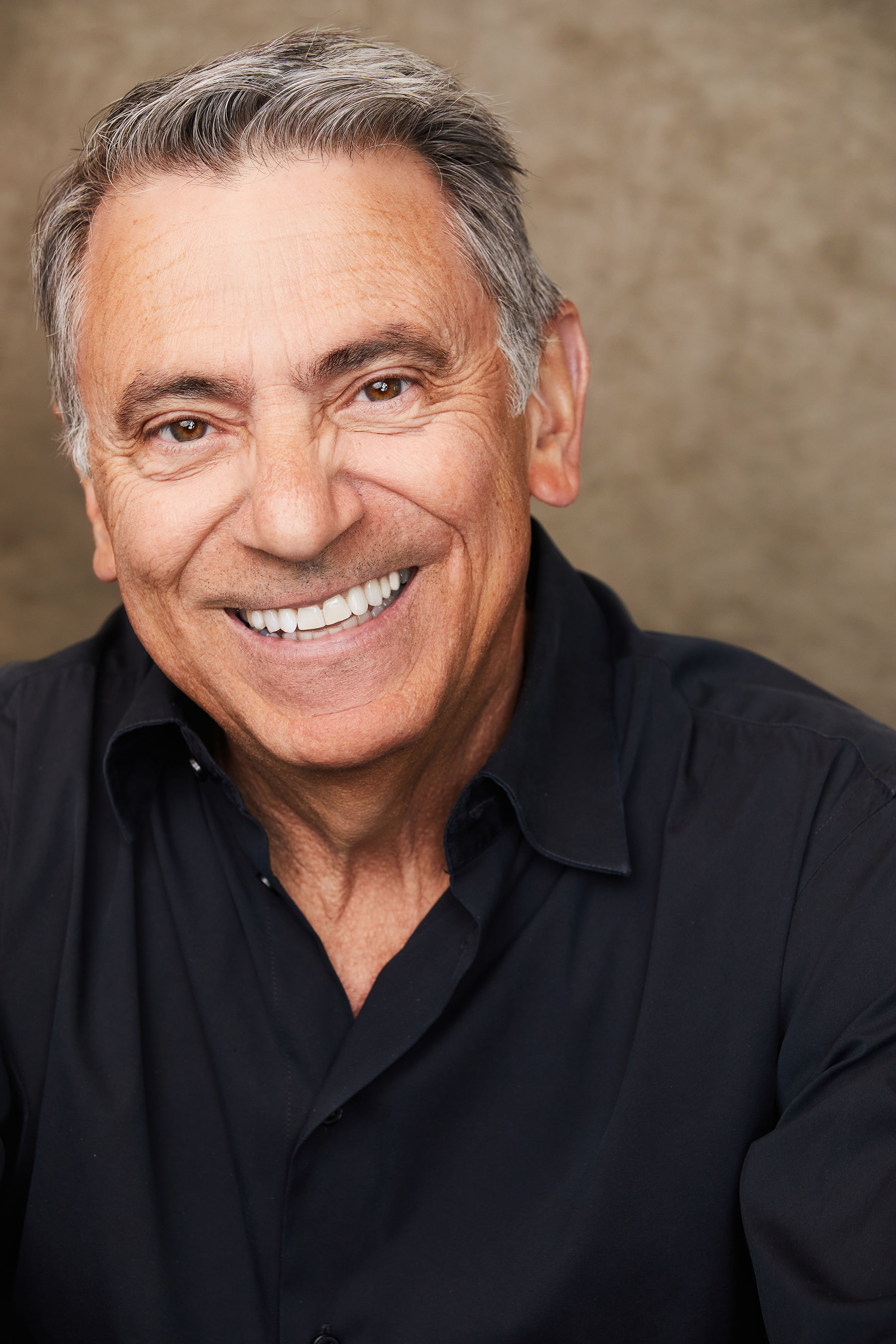
- Photo courtesy of Joe Cipriano.
- Born: David Joseph Cipriano; September 8, 1954 (age 72); Waterbury, Connecticut, U.S.
- Other names: Tom Collins, Dave Donovan
- Education: Watertown High School
- Occupation: Voice actor/Announcer
- Years active: 1978–present
- Title: Voice actor
- Spouse: Ann Gudelsky (m. 1979)
- Children: 2
- Website: www.joecipriano.com

David Joseph Cipriano (born September 8, 1954) is an American voice over actor, radio and TV on-air personality, and author. Since 1997, he has voiced promotional spots for the CBS television network.

== Early life and education ==
Cipriano was born September 8, 1954, in Waterbury, Connecticut. He attended Watertown High School. At age 14, Cipriano called into local disc jockey Jerry Wolf at WWCO-AM. He told Wolf that he aspired to become radio DJ and asked if he could visit the station to see what it was like. He would end up running errands and doing office work at the station on weekends and over the summer. When Cipriano was 16, he was hired to work on-air at WWCO-FM, a country music station, and WWCO-AM, a top-40 station, both in Waterbury. He was soon after hired at a third radio station, WDRC-FM, a top-40 station in Hartford. He used a different on-air pseudonym at each station.

After high school, Cipriano became the youngest on-air FM radio personality ever hired by NBC at age 19. It was there that he would meet his wife, Ann, on her first day at NBC as an AM news writer in 1976. They married in 1979.

== Career ==
Cipriano has worked for the NBC, ABC, Fox and CBS TV and radio networks. His radio career includes having hosted The World Chart Show from 1995 to 2004 and occasionally filling in for Casey Kasem on American Top 40. From 1987 to 1992, Cipriano produced and hosted two shows that aired in Tokyo, Yokohama, Osaka and Kobe, Japan: the L.A. Express and Toyota California Classics.

He has worked as an on-air personality using various names, including his birthname (Dave Cipriano), Dave Donovan, and Tom Collins, for the following radio stations:

- KIIS-FM – Los Angeles
- KKHR – Los Angeles (CBS Hitradio)
- KHTZ-FM – Los Angeles (K-Hits)
- WRQX – Washington, D.C. (ABC-Q107)
- WKYS – Washington, D.C. (NBC)
- WDRC AM/FM – Hartford, Connecticut
- WWCO AM/FM – Waterbury, Connecticut

=== Voice-over work ===
While still working in radio, Cipriano began picking up voice-over work in commercials. He recorded a demo reel of fake commercials using the recording studio at WRQX in Washington, D.C., where he was working at the time, and reached out to the Denenberg Agency, which was one of the agencies that provided recorded commercials for the radio station. He found moderate success in D.C. as a voice for local and regional ads, but his desire to work in network television led him to relocate to Los Angeles after securing a job at KHTZ. In 1988, he became the network promo voice of Fox Broadcasting Network after the head of on-air promos had heard him on-air while listening to KIIS FM. He has also been the network promo voice for CBS since 1997 and ESPN International since 2012. He previously has been the promo voice for NBC dramas, the Food Network, and the Hallmark Movie Network. Cipriano has announced the 57th, 59th, and 60th Emmy awards as well as Grammy award shows and special events. He has also been the live announcer for the Blockbuster Entertainment Awards, the VH1 Honors, and the GQ Magazine Men of the Year awards. Cipriano was one of the candidates to replace Charlie O'Donnell on Wheel of Fortune, performing as guest announcer for a week in 2011. He has also been the in-show narrator for a number of network game shows and reality shows, including Hollywood Game Night, America's Got Talent, Candy Crush, and Deal or No Deal.

In 2022, Cipriano began a voice over career consulting business that offers private career coaching with respect to the voice over and promo industry. He produces voice over demos for upcoming and established voice over actors and presents in-person and online classes around the world throughout the year focused on helping voice-over talent find their "Promo Mojo". Cipriano is also a founding member and current donor of the Don LaFontaine Voice Over Lab at the SAG Actors Center. The lab, named for prolific voice actor Don LaFontaine, serves as both a recording facility and educational resource for the voice actor community.

Cipriano uses a Neumann U 87 and Sennheiser 416 microphones for his voice-over work.

=== Book ===
Cipriano and his wife Ann co-authored his autobiography Living On Air: Adventures in Broadcasting, which was independently released in 2013.

In addition to his own autobiography, Cipriano is one of the contributors to Joan Baker's book "Secrets of Voice Over Success", which details the experiences of 13 different voice-over actors.

=== Awards ===
Cipriano is the recipient of the second-annual Don LaFontaine Legacy Award, recognizing "character, longevity, talent, professionalism, and the passion for giving back," presented at the 2010 PromaxBDA Promotions and Marketing Awards.

Cipriano's book Living on Air was given two awards in November 2014 in the 1st annual Voice Arts Awards in the audio book narration category for both biography and author performance.

He was also nominated for an Audie Award in 2015 in the Autobiography or Memoir category.
