= Craig Alanson =

American novelist (born 1962)

Craig Odell
- Born: 1962 (age 63–64); Springfield, Massachusetts, U.S.
- Occupation: Novelist
- Writing career
- Pen name: Craig Alanson
- Period: 2016–present
- Genres: Science fiction, fantasy
- Notable work: Expeditionary Force series
- Website: craigalanson.com

Craig Odell, better known by his pen name Craig Alanson, is an American author and audio playwright of science fiction and fantasy works, most notably the Expeditionary Force series.

== Career ==
Alanson began writing in 2006, developing his novels at nights and on weekends while working full-time. He began self publishing novels on Amazon in 2016. One of his three debut novels was Columbus Day, the first book in the Expeditionary Force ( ExForce ) series. The commercial success of Columbus Day, and the follow-up SpecOps, allowed Alanson to become a full-time writer. Alanson signed with Podium Publishing to produce the audiobook versions of the novels (Podium had previously produced the audiobook of Andy Weir's The Martian). The Expeditionary Force books are performed by award-winning narrator R. C. Bray, who had also narrated The Martian. The audiobook for Columbus Day was nominated for an "Audiobook of the Year" Audie Award in 2018.

In 2017 Alanson wrote a standalone novella called Trouble in Paradise, expanding on the events that take place between books three and four in the ExForce series. The novella laid the foundations for a short spin-off series set within the same fictional universe, entitled Mavericks. In 2019, Alanson committed to write a total of fourteen novels for Expeditionary Force and three Mavericks novels, though the third Mavericks novel was later revised as an ExForce title making it fifteen books in total for ExForce and two for Mavericks.. Alanson had originally decided to write 13 books in the series, but later continued beyond with the publication of Aftermath (book 16) in December 2023, followed by Task Force Hammer (book 17) and Gateway (book 18).

In 2017, Alanson released the audiobooks of the other two novels he had originally self-published alongside Columbus Day in 2016; a standalone young adult science-fiction story called Aces and an epic fantasy novel called Ascendant, the first book in the Ascendant trilogy. The Ascendant audiobooks were narrated by Tim Gerard Reynolds.

In 2019, the Homefront story within the Expeditionary Force series was released as an audio drama starring Star Trek alumni Kate Mulgrew, Zachary Quinto and Robert Picardo along with the audiobook narrator R.C. Bray. Alanson has expressed a desire to write and release a novelization of the play. In 2019, the Expeditionary Force series was optioned by Milmar Pictures for a Television series.

The audiobook for the twelfth novel in the series, Breakaway, debuted at number one on Audible for audio fiction and reached No. 5 on The New York Times Best Seller list in June 2021. The thirteenth book in series, Fallout, also debuted at number one on Audible for audio fiction when it was released in December 2021, and reached No. 10 on the New York Times Best Seller list.

Alanson has announced that after completing ExForce in 2022, his next series will be an urban fantasy called Convergence, with the first book in the series also called Convergence. In June 2022, Alanson announced on an AMA Reddit that while the ExForce series will officially end after book 15, he will write at least one additional novella set in the same fictional universe. In May 2023, Alanson announced at the end of the latest Convergence audio book that Expeditionary Force would be returning for a further 3 books in the main series, with book 16 being available for pre-order on Audible the following week.

== Personal life ==
Alanson lives in South Hero, Vermont with his wife Irene.

He was unable to pursue a career as a pilot in the United States Navy due to red-green color blindness. Alanson began working at United Technologies in Connecticut straight from school, working on aerospace projects. He moved to Gainesville, Virginia to work on defense contracts with United, which gave him exposure to the military jargon and concepts he would later use in his novels. Alanson later moved into finance, working for Hewlett-Packard where he wrote financial reports.

== Works ==
=== Novels ===
==== Expeditionary Force (book series) ====
A space opera describing the events after humanity is thrust into a galactic war following an alien invasion of Earth. The chief protagonists are Joe Bishop, a soldier in the United States Army, and Skippy, an advanced artificial intelligence from an ancient civilization who befriends Joe.

Unlike many military science fiction stories, the Expeditionary Force novels include a considerable amount of comedy, especially (though not entirely limited to) the many comic interactions between long-suffering Joe Bishop and practical joker Skippy.

Alanson describes Battle: Los Angeles as the initial inspiration for the story. Expeditionary Force has been released in both English and Polish, with the Polish ebooks published by Drageus Publishing House and the audiobook editions published by Heraclon International & StoryBox and narrated by Wojciech Masiak.

Book	Series Number	Date	ISBN	Notes
Columbus Day	1	January 2016	ISBN 978-1520126241	
SpecOps	2	June 2016	ISBN 978-1973181835	
Paradise	3	October 2016	ISBN 978-1973182665	
Trouble on Paradise	3.5	March 2017	ISBN 978-1973182801	Novella
Black Ops	4	May 2017	ISBN 978-1973186199	
Zero Hour	5	November 2017	ISBN 978-1973292418	
Mavericks	6	May 2018	ISBN 978-1717768186	
Renegades	7	November 2018	ISBN 978-1097199648	
Armageddon	8	August 2019	ISBN 978-1695578661	
Valkyrie	9	December 2019	ISBN 978-1672360081	
Critical Mass	10	August 2020	ISBN 979-8669877323	
Brushfire	11	December 2020	ISBN 979-8580899206	
Breakaway	12	June 2021	ISBN 979-8521670260	
Fallout	13	December 2021	ISBN 979-8779021395	
Match Game	14	June 2022	ISBN 979-8832704944	
Failure Mode	15	December 2022	ISBN 978-1520126241	
Aftermath	16	December 2023	ISBN 979-8876137494	
Task Force Hammer	17	September 2024	ISBN 979-8336989861	
Gateway	18	April 2025	ISBN 979-8315131137	
Ground State	19	January 2026	ISBN 979-8245598000	Announced on October 14, 2025

==== Mavericks ====
A spin-off from Expeditionary Force focused on a group of human soldiers cut off from Earth.

Book	Series Number	Date	ISBN
Deathtrap	1	May 2019	ISBN 978-1097220021
Freefall	2	June 2020	ISBN 979-8650428213

==== Convergence ====
A contemporary urban fantasy series.

Book	Series Number	Date	ISBN
Convergence	1	August 2022	ISBN 979-8846428812
Dragon Slayer	2	May 2023	ISBN 979-8859009145
First Strike	3	September 2023	ISBN 979-8859908639
Recon	4	May 2024	ISBN 979-8325171277
Desperate Measures	5	August 2025	
Dead World	6	May 2026	

==== Ascendant ====
A young-adult fantasy series following a boy with magical abilities as he discovers he is a Wizard.

Book	Series Number	Date	ISBN
Ascendant	1	October 2017	ISBN 978-1520271897
Transcendent	2	January 2018	ISBN 978-1520273945
Deceptions	3	April 2018	ISBN 978-1976800481

==== Others ====
Book	Date
Aces	December 2017

=== Audio dramas ===
Title	Date	Cast
Homefront (Expeditionary Force 7.5)	June 2019	R. C. Bray, Kate Mulgrew, Zachary Quinto, Robert Picardo, Lisa Renee Pitts, P. J. Ochlan and Peter Berkrot

== Awards ==
- Columbus Day – Audie Award – Audiobook of the Year 2018 (Nominated)
