= Society of Voice Arts and Sciences =

American nonprofit society

- Abbreviation: SOVAS
- Founded: 2013; 13 years ago
- Location: New York, NY USA
- Region served: International Voiceover Industry
- Product: Voice Arts Awards; That's Voiceover! Career Expo
- President: Rudy Gaskins (Chairman, CEO, and President)
- Website: sovas.org

The Society of Voice Arts and Sciences (SOVAS) is an American nonprofit voice acting and voice-over professional society established in 2013 "to galvanize the global voice acting community: connecting job seekers to the consummate sources of training, education, mentoring, and employment opportunities required to create and sustain a successful career in the voice-over industry". Headquartered in New York City, SOVAS presents the Voice Arts Awards and the annual That's Voiceover! Career Expo. SOVAS was co-founded by Rudy Gaskins, an Emmy-winning producer who serves as the organization's chairman and CEO, and actress and author Joan Baker, who serves as vice president.

== History ==
The founding of Society of Voice Arts and Sciences can be traced to the 2005 publication of Secrets of Voice-over Success by Joan Baker. What began as signing events to promote the book, which offered practical advice about voice acting as a career, soon evolved into seminars, community events, and workshops for both aspiring voice actors and those seeking to further existing careers in the voice-over industry. This led Baker and her husband and fellow industry producer, Rudy Gaskins, to recognize the need for more professional, educational, and community support for voice actors. In 2006, they organized the first-ever conference specifically for voice-over industry professionals. This conference would eventually become known as the That's Voiceover! Career Expo. The Voice Arts Awards were added as an event to conclude the Expo weekend in 2013, the same year as SOVAS was formally established.

SOVAS was officially established as a nonprofit corporation in the state of New York on August 26, 2013. Its originating officers were Rudy Gaskins (President), Joan Baker (Secretary), and Kim Gaskins (Treasurer). Stephen J. Ulrich, a former executive director for the Daytime Emmy Awards and Sports Emmy Awards and a five-time Emmy winner himself, was brought on shortly after to lend his experience and expertise to launch the Voice Arts Awards. He resigned in 2020 but is still involved as a producer and technical director for SOVAS's events. SOVAS established its first formal board of directors in 2020. The inaugural board members were David J. Kozlowski, Archie Elam, Jill Kershaw, Robin Armstrong, Debbe Hirata, Marc Guss, Juana Plata, Stewart Wilson Turner, Joe Cipriano, Kim Gaskins, Rudy Gaskins, and Joan Baker. Kim Gaskins resigned her treasurer position in 2021, but she remains on the board. Cipriano resigned his board position in 2022.

As part of its mission, SOVAS has advocated for diversity and inclusion in the voice-over industry. In 2020, the organization lent public support to a spate of white voice actors relinquishing their roles as non-white characters as a form of anti-racist solidarity. Gaskins and Baker also penned an op-ed for NBC News addressing this as well as the issue of racially-insensitive characters throughout the history of animation. The SOVAS International Ambassadors program recognizes influential voice-over artists around the world who work to galvanize the global voice acting community. These ambassadors include Susie Valerio, Danny Burnside, Ahmed Aqotb, Diane Pang Burnside, Shobo Seun, Themba Sibeko, Vicky Tessio, Angely Baez, Wael Habbal, Yukiko Fujimura, and Joel Snyder.

== Programs ==
SOVAS administers two main programs as part of their mission: the That's Voiceover! Career Expo and the Voice Arts Awards. SOVAS also maintains several charitable partnerships, including a longstanding relationship with the Alzheimer's Association in memory of Baker's father.

=== Voice Arts Awards ===
The Voice Arts Awards are an annual awards show created to recognize excellence and artistry within the voice-over and voice acting industry. The nominees and winners are voted on by a panel of industry peers within more than 120 categories. The winners are announced at a gala, which is held as a ticketed event in conjunction with the annual That's Voiceover! Career Expo.

Categories for the Voice Arts Awards include honors for nearly every aspect of voice-over and voice acting, including animation voice-over, video game voice-over, audiobook narration, TV and film narration, advertising campaigns, voice-over casting, directing, dubbing audio description (AD), and more. Submissions, nominations, and winners are international in scope, with specific categories for voice-over in English-speaking African nations, Spanish, Arabic, Japanese, Mandarin, Portuguese, and English. There are also several catch-all categories in which submissions can be made in any language. Some nominees and winners in these juried categories include Angela Bassett, Blue Ivy Carter, Beata Pozniak, Neil deGrasse Tyson, Cate Blanchett and Barack Obama.

The Voice Arts Awards also gives career achievement recognitions such as Outstanding Body of Work, Lifetime Achievement, Voice Arts Icon, Voice Arts Influencer, Backstage Vanguard Award, Environmental Award, Legacy Award, and Muhammad Ali Voice of Humanity Honor. Voice Arts Awards career achievement honorees include James Earl Jones, Jennifer Hale, Ken Burns, Nancy Cartwright, Keith David, Tara Strong, Rosario Dawson, William Shatner, Sigourney Weaver, Michael Buffer, Mark Hamill, Phil LaMarr, Jim Cummings, and Dr. Henry Louis Gates, Jr.

=== That's Voiceover! Career Expo ===
Baker and Gaskins organized the first career expo that would eventually become known as "That's Voiceover!" in 2006. Then called "Voices Behind the Scenes: The Art of Voice-over", and hosted at the Museum of the Moving Image in Queens, New York, it was what Gaskins described as the first-ever professional conference specifically for the voice-over industry. The conference was produced annually under several different names before Baker and Gaskins settled on "That's Voiceover!" as the permanent name for the career expo in 2010.
