= Candy Crush (game show) =

CBS game show

- Genre: Game show
- Based on: Candy Crush Saga
- Directed by: Ron de Moraes
- Presented by: Mario Lopez
- Narrated by: Joe Cipriano
- Country of origin: United States
- Original language: English
- No. of seasons: 1
- No. of episodes: 9

Production
- Executive producers: Matt Kunitz; John Quinn; Peter Levin; Russell Binder; Sebastian Knutsson; Nicki Sheard
- Producers: Chase Fleming; Andrena Hale
- Running time: 60 minutes
- Production companies: Pulse Creative; King; CBS Television Studios; Lionsgate Television

Original release
- Network: CBS
- Release: July 9 – September 2, 2017

Candy Crush is an American television game show based on the Swedish-Maltese mobile game Candy Crush Saga, published and developed by King. Hosted by Mario Lopez, the show features similar tile-matching gameplay to its namesake, but with the players suspended at a height in front of one of two 30-foot touchscreens, which then held the Guinness World Record for the largest touchscreens in the world.

Candy Crush premiered on CBS on July 9, 2017. The show received very negative critical reception, with several reviewers calling it one of the worst game shows ever made. The show was canceled following a single season of nine episodes, with the two-hour finale airing on September 2, 2017.

== Gameplay ==
=== Qualifying round ===
There are three Qualifying rounds that will earn a team the right to pick one of the four King-Sized Challenges. Each team that wins a qualifying round will have the right to pick one King-Sized Challenge, and the team that did not win the third qualifying round will have the remaining King-Sized Challenge that was not picked.

- Jelly Time – The players are strapped to candy canes while trying to remove 12 jelly squares from the board. The first team to remove all the jellies wins the round.
- Candy Toss – A candy will appear on their boards and one member will throw that candy into a box in front of their partners. Once the candy reaches the box, the other partner will have to match that candy in order to move on. The first team to four points wins the round.
- Liquorice Maze – One player from each team will scramble through three Licorice Mazes and then remove a Liquorice Lock by making a match by swiping an unlocked piece. Once the first player is done, they will tag the second player which they will do the same thing. The first team that removes both locks wins the round.
- Cake Bomb – Using their sugar sticks, the teams will try to remove eight slices of a cake by matching next to them using candy sticks with pointing hands on the end. The first team to remove eight slices of a cake wins the round.
- Candy Rush – It's a relay race where the team players take turns making matches on a board that grows every two matches. The first team to six matches wins the round.
- Sugar Spin – The players on the teams are strapped to turntables while trying to remove 12 jelly squares from the board to win the round.
- Cherry Drop – The players race to make matches in an attempt to get a cherry down to the bottom. But the one making the matches has to do it blindfolded and must depend on his/her partner to guide them.
- Free Yeti – The teams while strapped to candy skewers, will try to free Mr. Yeti under the frosting by making matches near the frosting to remove them.
- Stuck on You – A hazelnut at the top of the board is surrounded by frosting. The teams (who are stuck together) have to clear the frosting by making matches near it, and then make matches to drop the hazelnut to the bottom of the board. The first team to do so wins the round.

=== King-Sized Challenges ===
Each challenge has a 2-minute time limit for teams to make as many candy matches as they can. However, making certain combos will add time bonuses (just like the actual game). Three candies equals a match. A four-candy match gives the team another 5 seconds, while a five-candy match gives the team another 10 seconds. The two teams that have the highest candy matches will move on to the Ultimate Candy Clash for a chance at $100,000 and the team that have the lowest number of candy matches will be eliminated. In case of a tie with the same number of matches in the King-sized Challenge, the team who made that number of matches and got to the leaders' lounge first will have the advantage of a higher position in the Ultimate Candy Clash.

- Candy Cart – The team in control, wheels around the on-the-floor board on a two-person cart trying to make the matches.
- Sugar Swing – While suspended over the on-the-floor board, one player uses a long sugar stick to make the matches while his/her partner navigates.
- The Balloon – One player swings in the air facing the vertical wall, with his/her partner holds him/her by a rope.
- Spin Cycle – Both players on the team in control swings side to side facing the vertical wall. The catch in that they are placed back to back and spinning around throughout in a random manner.
- The Claw – One player hangs over the horizontal wall while the partner navigates the hanger. Based on the famous but complicated arcade game.
- Gumball Drop – Both players are tied together while gumballs appear down the board to make things hard for them.
- Candy Ladder – One player will be on a giant ladder while the other will move the ladder.
- Helping Hands – Players swing over the on-the-floor board while using the sugar sticks.
- High Rise – Both players on the team in control swings up and down on the vertical wall.
- Candyvator – The team stands on a special window-washing elevator. Both players must press a button at the same time to go up or down.
- Yankety-Yank – The players will hang on a special swing which will yank them all around the horizontal wall.
- Vine Climb – The team in control uses a vine to climb up and down the vertical wall.

=== Ultimate Candy Clash ===
Both the horizontal & vertical walls are split in half; which means that the top two teams, who made the most candy matches in the King-sized challenges, will be playing against each other. On the horizontal wall, one member from each team will have to match up candies in order to get a key all the way down to the bottom. Once a player does that, a real key appears and the player must take it to unlock his/her joystick. The joysticks control their partners who will be suspended in the air facing the vertical board and making matches. The first team to get 50 matches on the vertical wall wins the game and will be going home with $100,000.

The team in the lead gets to choose first from one of these three boosters, and the other team chooses from the remaining two. In case of a tie with the same number of matches from the King-sized Challenge, the team who got that number of candy matches and gets to the leaders' lounge first receives an advantage of choosing first from one of the three boosters.

The teams choose one of three boosters and it can be used only once during the round:

- Candy Cloud: The Bubblegum Troll clouds up their opponents' wall for 10 seconds.
- Double Delicious: Mr. Yeti makes a team's matches worth double, but only for 10 seconds.
- Miracle Match: Tiffi makes three matches on their team's behalf.
- Freeze Burn: An ice cube freezes their opponents' wall for 10 seconds.
- Candy Tornado: A tornado will blow away all of their opponents' candies.

=== Other Records ===
- The highest number of matches ever made on the show was 77 by Daniel & Krystal on August 27, 2017. The second highest was 76 which was by Layla & Stephen on August 6, 2017.
- The lowest number of matches ever made on the show was 12 by Kizzie & Elle on September 2, 2017, Part 1. The second lowest was 16 by Da'Vonne & Paul on July 9, 2017.
- Layla & Stephen were the first team ever to break the highest number of matches on a King-Sized Challenge and shutout a team in the Ultimate Candy Clash; in their case, they shutout Jerry & George 50 to 0 to win the $100,000 Prize.
- Daniel & Krystal were the second team ever to break the highest number of matches on a King-Sized Challenge and they beat Aliyah & Stephanie in the Ultimate Candy Clash to win the $100,000.
- Rio & Sammie were the first team ever to not win a qualifying round and make a major epic comeback; in their case, they played their King-Sized Challenge by getting more than 40 matches to eliminate Paul & Brittany, and then beat Ken & Evan in the Ultimate Candy Clash to win the $100,000 on August 20, 2017.

== Production ==
In October 2016, CBS greenlit the show with the series premiering on July 9, 2017. The first episode was filmed in May 2017. After one season, the series was cancelled. The finale premiered September 2, 2017.

== Reception ==
=== Viewing figures ===
#	Air Date	Timeslot (EDT)	United States				Ref.
#	Air Date	Timeslot (EDT)	18–49 (rating/share)	Viewers (millions)	Rank (timeslot)	Rank (night)	Ref.
1	July 9, 2017	Sunday 9:00 p.m.	1.1/5	4.05	1	3	
2	July 16, 2017	Sunday 9:00 p.m.	0.8/3	2.86	2	4	
3	July 23, 2017	Sunday 9:00 p.m.	0.5/2	2.28	2	8	
4	July 30, 2017	Sunday 9:00 p.m.	0.5/2	2.42	2	7	
5	August 6, 2017	Sunday 9:00 p.m.	0.4/2	1.99	3	10	
6	August 13, 2017	Sunday 9:00 p.m.	0.5/2	2.20	3	9	
7	August 20, 2017	Sunday 9:00 p.m.	0.4/2	1.98	4	14	
8	August 27, 2017	Sunday 9:00 p.m.	0.4/2	2.01	3	14	
9^{1}	September 2, 2017	Saturday 8:00 p.m.	0.2/1	1.39	—N/a	—N/a	—N/a

- ^Note 1: Episode 9 aired as a special 2 hour season finale episode.

=== Critical response ===
Candy Crush was very poorly received by critics and viewers. The show currently holds a rating of 2.1 on IMDb.

Nick Slatt of The Verge considered it to be "an unmitigated train wreck that's banking on the lasting popularity of its lead-in, Big Brother, to drive Sunday night viewership". He compared its concept to esports and video game livestreaming, but argued that the key difference between them and Candy Crush was that the enjoyment of Candy Crush Saga stemmed from the experience of actually playing it, and that beyond the physical challenges, there was "nothing interesting about watching the actual game being played" and that the show was an example of "flattening something that discretely dynamic into a chintzy game show completely misunderstands why people watch video games at all, which is mostly to marvel at the unbridled excellence of a pro or to sink into the antics and narration of an entertainer." Other commentators such as Andy Dehnart of reality blurred, Sarah Perez of TechCrunch, and Ana Valens of CGMagazine agreed that Candy Crush gameplay was not interesting enough to watch.

Nick Valdez of Destructoid reported he was confused at the show's mechanics, saying "What fucking game was I watching? No seriously, I took some notes and I still don't really remember how things got from point A to B." He also questioned the notability of celebrity guests such as Frankie Grande, and suggested Lopez's career was being hurt by hosting the show.
