= Rudy Gaskins =

American television producer

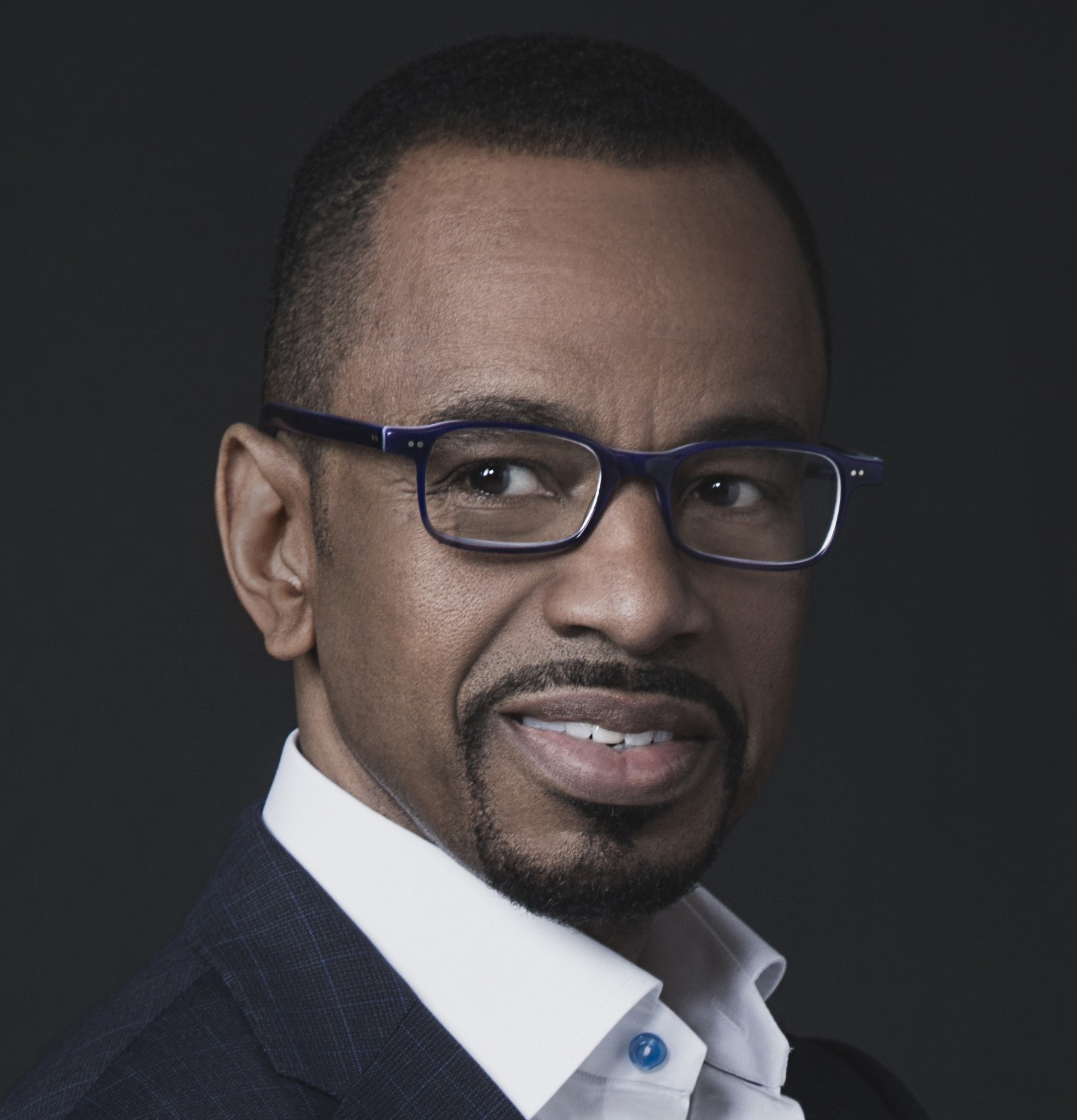
- Gaskins in 2017
- Born: Washington, D.C., U.S.
- Education: New York University
- Occupations: Producer, director
- Title: Chairman and CEO, Society of Voice Arts and Sciences
- Spouse: Joan Baker (m. 1998)

Rudy Gaskins is an American television producer and director. He is also a co-founder of the Society of Voice Arts and Sciences (SOVAS), where he serves as chairman and CEO. Gaskins won an Emmy for his work on promotions for the 2000 Summer Olympics for NBC.

== Career ==
Gaskins studied film and television at NYU Tisch School of the Arts. While he was a student, he created Brownstone Magazine, a school-sponsored student publication targeted at the school's Black community. The magazine was published until around 1996, and in 2018, students at NYU revived the publication under the same title. Gaskins also wrote, produced, and directed a number of short films as a student, including I Wanna Play, which won "Best Comedy" at the NYU Film Festival.

Upon graduating, Gaskins was hired as an apprentice film editor on Francis Ford Coppola's The Cotton Club. While he was an undergrad, Gaskins met Spike Lee, who was a graduate student at the time. Gaskins worked with Lee on some student projects and would later be hired as an editor on Lee's films Do The Right Thing and School Daze.

Wanting to become a director, Gaskins moved into the television industry and began working on documentaries for PBS, eventually producing or directing nearly 12 hours of documentary programming for the broadcaster. He eventually moved on to work as a producer for ABC News advertising and promotion and later for Court TV as vice president of the channel's creative services department. While at Court TV, Gaskins oversaw a format and branding transition for the channel from news to entertainment.

In 2000, Gaskins co-founded Push Creative with his wife and business partner, Joan Baker. The agency's first project, developing a teaser campaign for NBC's coverage of the 2000 Summer Olympics, earned Gaskins and his agency an Emmy Award. Push's clients included several major television networks and brands, and the agency was awarded over 20 Telly Awards for its advertising work. However, the agency closed in 2014 so Gaskins could focus on his position as chairman and CEO of the Society of Voice Arts and Sciences, a nonprofit professional organization for voice-over artists and voice actors. Gaskins and Baker, who is also an accomplished voice-over artist and the author of a book about the voice-over industry, founded the organization in 2013 after eight years of producing seminars, community events, workshops, and conferences for aspiring voice artists as well as those already in the industry. Gaskins produces SOVAS's annual awards show, the Voice Arts Awards and advocates for representation and diversity within the voice-over industry as part of the organization's mission.
