= Nemesis Saga =

Series of kaiju thriller novels by Jeremy Robinson

- First edition cover of Project Nemesis
- Author: Jeremy Robinson
- Country: United States
- Language: English
- Genre: Fantasy, Science fiction, kaiju
- Publisher: St. Martin's Press / Breakneck Media
- Published: 2012 – 2016
- Media type: Print (hardback & paperback), audiobook
- No. of books: 6

The Nemesis Saga is a series of six kaiju thriller novels written by American author Jeremy Robinson, featuring the massive Goddess of Vengeance Nemesis. Robinson noted that various classic kaiju films especially those featuring Godzilla and Gamera (the latter he has said is his favorite kaiju) were big influences on the series.

== Premise ==
Nemesis is the ancient Goddess of Vengeance, a massive kaiju that has been dormant for millennia. Once awoken she seeks out justice for the tormented, destroying all who stand in her way. When she becomes inhabited by the tortured consciousness of Maigo, a little girl brutally murdered by her own father, Nemesis seeks to make the world pay, starting with large cities filled with crunchy people.

== Characters ==
The following are principal or recurring characters in the Nemesis Saga:

- Jon Hudson
- Ashley Collins
- Maigo
- Katsu Endo
- Mark Hawkings
- Lilly
- Rich "Woodstock" Woodall

== Kaiju ==
=== Terminology ===
- Gestorumque - The species name of all Kaiju.
- Mashintorum - The species name of a giant mechanical weapon built to fight the Gestorumque.
- Voice - Depending on the situation, this is either a pilot or advisor to the Gestorumque or Mashintorum. The Voice can be human or alien so long as they are small enough.
- Aeros - A warmongering alien species filled with dictators.
- Ferox - An evolutionary deviation from the Aeros species. They are smaller and possess shapeshifting abilities. The Aeros deem them impure and wish to exterminate them.

The following kaiju appear in the novels.

=== Nemesis Prime (Corpse) ===
Nemesis Prime was the first Gestorumque (species name) to land on Earth as far as the books are concerned. The corpse of Nemesis Prime is found in a cave in Alaska by Katsu Endo, who becomes infatuated with the being from then on.

Due to the recognition that early humans showed the beast, it can be inferred it was on Earth for some time before engaging in its true mission which was to destroy Atlantis and kill all people with Atlantean genes. This mission was given to it by the Aeros (one of two warring alien races). Its masters and their trait of hunting down those with Atlantean bloodlines can be somewhat seen in the present-day Nemesis. Nemesis Prime was killed during the assault on the city by Hyperion, a mecha-kaiju sent by the Ferox (the second warring alien race) to defend Atlantis.

Nemesis Prime is considerably bulkier than Nemesis, while still retaining all of its traits. Its skin is a darker black and more jagged than the current Nemesis. The kaiju has three trident-tipped tails as opposed to Nemesis's one. Like all the kaiju of its kind, it possesses orange membranes containing a liquid that explodes on contact with air.

Ashtaroth, a being composed of many kaiju species, has a secondary form not dissimilar to the Divine Retribution form of Nemesis. It is unclear whether or not Nemesis Prime and Neo Prime possess a form like this, nor is it clear if Nemesis Prime or Neo Prime have the ability to regurgitate and project the orange liquid like the present Nemesis can.

=== Nemesis ===
Not a kaiju born through natural means. Nemesis is the genetic clone of Nemesis Prime based on the human DNA of Maigo Tilly, later Maigo Hudson. Because of this unique mixing of DNA, Nemesis is quite unlike its brethren.

As soon as she was born and free to move around, Nemesis began eating people to stave off its insatiable appetite. This rapidly progressed to eating whales to satisfy the creatures vast hunger. Nemesis grew at an astonishing rate before slowing, if not fully stopping, at around 350 feet tall.

Due to being killed by her stepfather, Maigo had an understandable rage towards the man and this rage drove Nemesis to seek him out through what was later explained as sensing an Atlantean gene. It would continue to seek out this gene, but only for the purpose of killing people worthy of her wrath, unlike its ancestor who sought it out merely to kill. Maigo gave Nemesis a conscious, making it humanities defender rather than executioner. Its lust for vengeance was so great however that this often meant stampeding through a city to reach its target.

Nemesis is able to be controlled, in part, by a pilot or "Voice". While Maigo took on this role, Nemesis's eyes were a human-like brown reflecting Maigo's own. Once Maigo left Nemesis and was reconstituted in human form the kaiju's eyes reverted to the same glowing orange seen in the other beasts. When Katsu Endo became Nemesis's voice later in the story arc, her eyes retained the orange glow.

Nemesis seems able to remember all the torture Nemesis Prime was subjected to and as such her Voices also experience these memories. Due to these memories, Nemesis initially had an immense hatred for Hyperion, the mecha-kaiju that killed its ancestor.

In terms of appearance, it is a significantly lighter kaiju than Nemesis Prime or Neo Prime. Its skin is black in color and has been described as fungal, meaning it is an entity separate from her and can grow back independently and at alarming rates. It possesses the orange glowing membranes like those in its family group. Nemesis, Nemesis Prime, Neo Prime, Karkinos, Typhon, Scylla, Drakon, and Scrion all appear to have this distinguishing attributes separating them from other kaiju like Lovecraft or Giger, implying there are many races inside the kaiju species.

Nemesis has razor-sharp claws and teeth, sharp enough to easily tear through the flesh of other Kaiju. The claws on Nemesis do not appear to have a solid design pinned down, the books describe the claws as two giant fingers fused together, while the comics and concept art show the Kaiju as having five separate fingers with claws at the end. It has a long trident tipped tail, the end seemingly composed of the same material as its claws.

Nemesis has two skills seemingly unique to other Kaiju. It can spit out a globule of the combustible orange liquid that is covered in a layer of its own saliva to ensure it doesn't explode until it reaches its target.

Its second ability, while similar to Ashtaroth's, is still quite unique. When necessary, Nemesis excretes a mucus-like substance that allows it to shed its skin, which can later grow back, to reveal a form with gleaming white skin underneath. This Divine Retribution form, as it was later named by Jon Hudson, while more fragile reveals two pure white wings. These wings aren't designed for flight. Each "feather" is a highly reflective mirror. When all the feathers are aligned correctly, the sun's light is refracted through to create a beam of pure heat energy, powerful enough to punch through Kaiju and buildings alike. These feathers fall off shortly after using the form. Nemesis is weakened and extremely vulnerable in its post-Divine Retribution form, so much so that even conventional weapons like missiles can injure it.

In the book, many believe the dust made from the mirrors have some sort of healing property, however, it is never addressed and is likely that it has no purpose other than refracting light.

Nesmsis's wings can also be used for additional defense and they seem to hold up extremely well against the Self-Immolation attacks, the name adopted for the exploding membranes, as witnessed in the final battle of Washington D.C. and the massive self-immolation of Ashtaroth that appeared to kills Nemesis.

Nemesis is extremely resilient and has survived all manner of attacks from a GBU-43/B Massive Ordnance Air Blast MOAB strike to the Kaiju Self-Immolation seen in any book whose blast rivals that of several nuclear explosions, to every type of physical attack the Kaiju can throw at her. Despite this, Nemesis has been presumed dead twice, the first time revealed her to be alive shortly after, but the second time was in the battle of Project Legion and as of now, the humans are unaware of her survival.

Oceans are where she feels most comfortable, probably due to the lesser gravity on her incredibly heavy body and her current residence is under the ice of Europa, where she lives out her days swimming around the secret ecosystem.

=== Karkinos ===
Karkinos is the offspring from a brood of five eggs laid by Nemesis Prime just before it died and is considered one of Nemesis's siblings.

Its appearance is the closest to Nemesis Prime or Nemesis herself. It is larger, spikier, and slower. Arguably the strongest of the five born from Nemesis Prime and possibly stronger than Nemesis herself.

It has three large claws and a tail with a single spike at the end. Aside from its overwhelming size and strength, Karkinos has no unique powers. It can likely be confirmed that it has no secondary form since in Project Legion when it was split in half, there was no mention of a white skin underneath. Its thick skin was enough to repel the diamond-tipped drill of the Zoomb control devices. It, like all of its brethren, has a Self-Immolation attack.

Karkinos has three separate book appearances, once in Project Maigo as the final Kaiju enemy in Washington D.C., once in Project Hyperion as a Voiceless clone, and again in Project Legion as a Kaiju clone piloted by Ashley Collins. Its first death was partially its own fault, General Gordon, who was controlling the five at the time, commanded Karkinos to Self-Immolate right next to the White House, intending to kill Jon Hudson in the process. Just in the nick of time, however, Nemesis stepped in front of the blast, using her wings to reflect the blast right back at the Kaiju, killing it almost instantly. Its second death was after being implanted with the Aeros Voice from the Nemesis Prime corpse. Its third death was at the hands of Ashtaroth, the final Kaiju enemy in Project Legion. As mentioned earlier, it was piloted by Ashley Collins and during the fight, it was stepped on and ripped in two. Technically the cloned Kaiju had no conscious at the time, so it was more Collins experiencing the death.

=== Typhon ===
Typhon was one of the five eggs laid by Nemesis Prime just before it died and is considered one of Nemesis's siblings.

It is the most humanoid of any of the Kaiju in the book, having five fingers and toes at the ends of black-armored arms and legs. It has no tail and a small number of defensive spikes on its elbows and knees. Under the control of Mark Hawkins, it was able to inflict considerable damage on Kaiju larger or stronger than it. This can be attributed to the fact that Hawkins was a trained hunter and has taken down opponents much larger than him before. It was also armed with massive stone knives at the time, giving him a huge advantage.

Typhon has been deemed the smartest of the five. This is probably because it swatted away the Zoomb control device, despite already tanking multiple missile swarms. While the Kaiju alone never displays any advanced hand to hand tactics, it is inferred that under the control of an experienced fighter the Kaiju would be incredibly powerful against an opponent that was relatively close to its size. In fact, any Kaiju being piloted by a battle-worn human is shown to be much more effective in battle. As shown with Katsu Endo inside Nemesis and later on with the five cloned Kaiju, Karkinos, Scylla, Scrion, Typhon, and Drakon being piloted by five respective humans.

The only unique skill that Typhon seems to possess is the ability to have four claw-like appendages sprout from its mouth. These would likely be used to hold an enemy in place, however, the skill shows next to no use in the books. If anything, this uniqueness displays a flaw in the Kaiju's design. The ability to hold something in place with teeth would be better suited to a creature that has no opposable thumbs. With Typhon, who has two very humanlike arms there is no need for an extra grappling appendage. This trait is correctly displayed in Drakon's unique ability. However, there is the possibility that these claws are designed for intimidation, but against other Kaiju, these claws have never shown any effectiveness.

Typhon has three book appearances, once in Project Maigo as the final Kaiju enemy in Washington D.C., once as a Voiceless clone in Project Hyperion, and again in Project Legion as a Kaiju clone piloted by Mark Hawkins.

=== Scylla ===
Scylla was one of the five eggs laid by Nemesis Prime just before it died and is considered one of Nemesis's siblings.

Scylla is possibly one of the weirdest designs to come out of Nemesis Prime's offspring. It has a short and stout body, for a Kaiju that is, and a large, hammerhead-like head. It possesses a very short and overall useless tail. Like the other Kaiju, it has the same bone-colored claws and talons as well as the Self-Immolation Membranes on its body. This Kaiju lacks a lot of the spikes that make its siblings so intimidating.

While Scylla is arguably not the weakest, that title going to either Drakon or Scrion, who prioritize movement or strength, Scylla could still be considered far weaker than Nemesis, Karkinos, or Typhon. Despite not being overly powerful or unique, it has the most focus out of the five siblings. This is thanks to being under the control of Jon Hudson not just once, but twice, with a third pilot being Ted Watson before the cloned Kaiju's eventual death.

Seemingly, the only aspect that would be considered “unique” of Scylla is its head. As Jon Hudson once described it, the design of the head allowed him to see much more than should've been possible for a normal human. In battle, whether controlled or free of a Voice, Scylla favors its incredible bite strength in order to damage enemies, ans its claws don't have enough force behind them to rival most of its brethren.

Scylla has three book appearances. Once in Project Maigo as the final Kaiju enemy in Washington D.C. that was taken over by Jon Hudson with the help of the Zoomb control device, once as a Voiceless clone in Project Hyperion, and again in Project Legion as a Kaiju clone piloted by Jon Hudson and subsequently Ted Watson.

=== Drakon ===
Drakon was one of the five eggs laid by Nemesis Prime just before it died and is considered one of Nemesis's siblings.

Drakon's appearance resembles that of a Komodo Dragon quite closely, with an elongated neck and head, a quadrupedal form, and tail. Like the rest of its species, Drakon has a multitude of locations for bone-colored spikes to pop out of. Most notable of these locations is its back, the spikes mirroring a shark's fin, or a stegosaurus's own spikes. Its talons are probably the smallest amongst the Nemesis genome and its tail saw no use as a weapon in the books. It possesses Self-Immolation membranes.

Drakon is the most agile and possibly the fastest of the Kaiju, aside from maybe Giger. It is also the shortest, its body hangs lower to the ground, making even the tiny Scrion taller, but not necessarily bigger overall since Drakon is longer.

Aside from its speed, Drakon's only unique ability, which is similar to Typhon's, is the ability to split its head apart into two half pieces and latch onto an opponent with both its teeth and two tipped tongue that bears a striking resemblance to Nemesis's tail. The head splits just a little bit behind the eyes, implying that its brain is farther back in its neck than one would first guess.

Drakon only has two book appearances, once as the final enemy in Project Maigo, and once as a Kaiju clone piloted by Avril Joliet in Project Legion.

=== Scrion ===
Scrion was one of the five eggs laid by Nemesis Prime just before it died and is considered one of Nemesis's siblings.

Scrion has been described as puglike, with arguably the smallest design of the Kaiju. It is quadrupedal, but thanks to its very tanky body, it is nowhere near as fast. Its tail could more accurately be called a stub and it has a decent amount of armor plating covering its back. It has only a few spikes coming out of the joints in its legs. It possesses Self-Immolation Membranes.

Scrion was deemed the weakest of the seven or so Kaiju that make up the Nemesis genome. It was killed first in Project Maigo, quite early into the book I might add. It was also killed with incredible ease as Nemesis was seen toying with it, rather than rampaging to stop it. However, it did have a slightly bigger impact during Project Legion. With Stan Tremblay AKA Rook, a military specialist from another universe, piloting it, the Kaiju displayed a shocking amount of usefulness, bringing down a GUS hanging over the human base as well as removing some armor plating from Astaroth. Of course, this does not make it strong. During its attack against Astaroth, it managed to kill itself by accidentally stabbing itself with one of the Kaiju's spikes.

Scrion has no special or unique abilities to speak of.

Scrion had two book appearances once as the first Kaiju threat in Project Maigo, and once as a Kaiju clone piloted by Rook in Project Legion.

=== Megatsuchi ===
Megatsuchis are one of the two Kaiju that is partially earthly in origin, Nemesis being the other. They are birthed after a Tsuchi or BFS (Big Fucking Spiders) as they were more commonly called infected the thought to be dead body of Nemesis, creating a hybrid between the Kaiju and the spider-like monster.

Megatsuchis have eight limbs and a scorpion-like tail. The shell on their back, once a turtle shell, was replaced with the genetics of Nemesis, making the plating incredibly strong. It also has the orange membranes associated with the Nemesis Genome, making it possible that they are considered Nemesis's offspring or siblings. It has plenty of hard armor around all eight legs, four of which it uses to stand up and face off against bigger enemies. Its head is also an odd mix of spider and beetle, having eight eyes and two inward-facing mandibles.

Like early Nemesis, the three Megatsuchi that lived to grow to Nemesis height had insatiable appetites, tearing through entire cities and eating thousands in the process(three other Megatsuchis were created, but all were killed in their infancy by Nemesis.)

Megatsuchis are rather powerful, strong enough to nearly overpower a Voiceless Nemesis. This is probably thanks to the Kaiju's multitudinous limbs and tail, which if stabbed with, would've meant certain death for Nemesis. The Kaiju also appears capable of strategy, such as when the infant versions attempted to paralyze Nemesis with a shock from its mandibles so it could implant its young directly inside Nemesis's head. It is also inferred that it has high mental capabilities through the control of its eight limbs, all of which it uses simultaneously to pick people up and eat them, even from inside buildings. It is unknown if its tail shares this same autonomy for certain, but it is likely.

Megatsuchis are beings with several unique powers. First of all and most disgusting, is the ability to stab its tail into an enemy, something it does three times in rapid succession, in order to implant its young, which will balloon in size inside the host and eventually burst out, usually meaning certain death. The adolescent versions of the Megatsuchi showed off this against the full-sized Nemesis, keeping it from being fatal, however, a strike to any vitals would most likely be fatal. The full-sized Megatsuchi attempted to use this trait against Nemesis but was unsuccessful in hitting it. The larva that came out of the tail was compared to that of a rhinoceros. In addition, any young implanted would take on the aspects of the host body, hence why some of the Megatsuchi had the Self-Immolation membranes. This was later demonstrated when one of the Tsuchi implanted in an Aeros and gained some of the tentacles that were associated with the aliens. Like Giger, this host implanting power seems reminiscent of the chest bursters, who would also take on attributes of their hosts. Megatsuchis as mentioned earlier, also have an electric shock that they can deliver through their mandibles. It is used to briefly paralyze Nemesis in a few instances and the perspective of someone eaten by the Megatsuchi mentioned that they were similarly hit with the shock just before dying, making the death painless.

Megatsuchis had one book appearance as the main antagonist of Project 731. Although, it is arguable that the smaller Tsuchis that show up during Project Legion to help attack the Aeros mothership count as an appearance.

=== Giger ===
Giger is one of the Gestorumque or Kaiju created by the Aeros to fight the earthly Kaiju and Hyperion. Due to its frequent deployment by the Aeros it can be inferred that this is one of the two basic ground troops used by the alien species.

Giger has one of the most recognizable designs in the series, mostly thanks to the striking resemblance it shares with the Xenomorph from the Alien franchise. It is named Giger after H.R. Giger, the man who created the Xenomorph design. Notably, it does seem to be much skinnier and bonier than the Xenomorph. Giger is also the first Gestorumque that differs from the Nemesis Genome. It is entirely black, has no bone-like spikes, does not have orange eyes, and does not possess a Self-Immolation ability. Rather Giger has thin spines running up and down its body, from the base of its head, to near the end of its tail. It is unknown if there is a purpose for these spines, but a few theories include, regulating temperature by pushing hot blood up to it in order to cool it quicker, offensive capabilities by means of launching its back at an enemy, or perhaps they act as antennae, increasing the Kaiju's reaction time or perception, allowing Giger to fight at the incredible speeds it moves at. Giger also has two sets of arms, both of which are relatively small compared to other Kaiju. It is bipedal and its spindly legs allow it to reach the fastest speed of any Kaiju.

Gigers all seem to be piloted by an Aeros Voice, making them strategic fighters capable of taking advantage of all Giger's abilities. One Giger was able to take down a three Kaiju squad composed of Karkinos, Typhon, and Scylla with ease. Of course, later on, one Scylla piloted by Jon Hudson was able to easily dispatch several of the Giger species alone. This could imply that these Gigers were being piloted by weaker pilots or that the Nemesis Genome, when affected by rage, far surpass the strength of any other Gestorumque species. This was reinforced as Jon Hudson was under the influence of Nemesis Prime's memories, making him extremely angry. Giger's tail, while at first appearing to be harmless, has an extremely sharp tip, allowing it to be thrust straight into Karkinos's armor and the tail was also strong enough to support Giger's whole weight as it was used to lift its body onto Karkinos's back. As mentioned earlier its thin and seemingly frail body allows it to be the fastest of any known Kaiju, but that does not mean it is weak. This is shown after it takes a direct Self-Immolation and sheds its skin, revealing an undamaged inside.

Aside from its speed and its shedding skin, which does not give it a second form like Nemesis, Giger has no unique powers to speak of.

Giger makes two book appearances, once in Project Hyperion as an opponent for the Kaiju squad, Nemesis, and Hyperion. Its second appearance was in Project Legion as five of the Kaiju Species descended to destroy the human-controlled Kaiju clones alongside another five Lovecraft.

As a side note, thanks to its Alien-like design, there is the possibility that it was somehow either seen before by H.R. Giger, inspiring him to create the Xenomorph, or even more unlikely, H.R. Giger's design somehow influenced the Aeros. Aeros' Kaiju have been shown to have landed on Earth pre-Project Nemesis, so it is a possibility.

=== Lovecraft ===
Lovecraft is one of the Gestorumque or Kaiju created by the Aeros to fight the earthly Kaiju and Hyperion. Due to its frequent deployment by the Aeros it can be inferred that this is one of the two basic ground troops used by the alien species.

Lovecraft, aptly named for its Lovecraftian design, is a knuckle-walking squid headed Kaiju, with two wings. It is incredibly bulky and heavily muscled, to the point where one wouldn't expect the creature capable of flight. Its skin is luminescent and somewhat blue in color. It is unknown what its mouth looks like, however, thanks to the squid-like head and tentacles covering the mouth, it can be inferred that it has a beak similar to most giant squids.

Lovecraft is likely one of the most versatile Kaiju in the series. Not only does it have immense strength and durability, but it has shown on multiple occasions that it is very capable speed-wise, and also possesses flight. It has survived and escaped battles with both Hyperion and Nemesis on two separate occasions, which is a rare feat. Lovecraft's, like Giger's, are piloted by Aeros' voices, giving them enhanced intelligence. Lovecraft has used this intelligence to make tactical retreats after completing its missions. These missions also revealed that the Aeros are truly the ones in control of their Kaiju, unlike with Nemesis and Hyperion, whose Voices are closer to advisors than drivers. This implies that the Aeros' Kaiju are either born without any consciousness, like the clones made by the Ferox, or that the Aeros have strong enough wills to completely control the Kaiju.

It could be said that Lovecraft has no unique abilities since flight is a trait that is shared with the G.U.S. but unlike the G.U.S. it is capable of directing its flight via wings instead of simply floating around like a balloon. Lovecraft's wings are too weak to support its full body weight, so in order to achieve liftoff, Lovecraft both voids its massive bowels and a good portion of the blubbery fat that gave it such survivability. Its exact flight speed is unknown, but it was able to escape both Hyperion, who can teleport, in its agility form, and Nemesis, who is one of the fastest Gestorumque. however, when it was escaping Nemesis, Nemesis was already tired and injured from battle.

Giger makes two book appearances, once in Project Hyperion as the final Kaiju antagonist for Nemesis and Hyperion. Its second appearance was in Project Legion as five of the Kaiju Species descended to destroy the human-controlled Kaiju clones alongside another five Giger.

As a side note, like with Giger, Lovecraft's design seems to be heavily inspired by Lovecraftian stories. In-universe, this could imply that either the Aeros were somehow inspired by H.P. Lovecraft's work, or he was inspired by Lovecraft's design. Aeros' Kaiju have been shown to have landed on Earth pre-Project Nemesis, so it is a possibility.

=== Hyperion ===
Hyperion is a part of the species known as the Mashintorum. He appears to have no gender but is commonly referred to as he. Thanks to his mech-like appearance and Ferox origin, it is a little bit of a stretch to categorize him as a Kaiju, however, his armor is self-repairing, indicating either some form of techno-organic component or nanobot involvement. Built by the Ferox, he was sent to Earth in order to guard Atlantis and would later be discovered by Maigo to fight against the Aeros invasion.

Hyperion has two forms, one which is bulkier and appears equipped with more armaments, while the second form is based on speed and agility. Both are very humanoid. The bulky form somewhat resembles a samurai, with its skirt-like armor covering its thighs and extra armor around its shoulders and chest. This form is also equipped with shoulder-mounted energy cannons. It appears slightly shorter than the agility form, which implies that the extra mass of the armor was not simply shed, but redistributed to make Hyperion taller. In terms of durability, this form was shown taking much more damage than its later agility form, which could be attributed to the fact that it was not yet adjusted to its Voice's fighting style, making it far less effective.

Hyperion's agility form has far less around its chest, waist, legs, and shoulders. As mentioned above, this mass possibly went towards making the mech taller, however, this could be a trick of perspective, it is unclear. The agility form lacks the same shoulder-mounted energy cannons, but its arms and legs stay relatively close to the bulkier forms size. Not much else is special about this form, aside from increased speed.

Hyperion possesses a host of weapons, each of which requires varying amounts of energy from its core, also known as a Rift Engine or The Bell. The Rift Engine generates an endless supply of energy through a very complicated use of Zero-point energy, which is explained more in Jeremy Robinson's other novel, SecondWorld. The Rift Engine is capable of teleporting Hyperion through space instantaneously. Another Bell, which was used outside of Hyperion's body, was shown to be capable of interdimensional travel and of opening Einstein-Rosen bridges (essentially portals.) It could also cause the humans touching the bell to become intangible and capable of flight, implying either a use of density shifting or partial phasing into a different dimension. Unfortunately, Hyperion is only capable of harnessing its endless energy supply and teleportation within its own dimension. It is unknown why it cannot use these functions, but a few theories are, the Rift Engine can only use these functions with limited mass, meaning Hyperion is too large to use it, or the energy produced by the Bell is not enough to both power Hyperion and access the more powerful functions, or quite simply, when building Hyperion, the Ferox decided that Hyperion did not require these functions and left them out of that specific Rift Engine. The final theory appears to be most likely. Finally, in terms of support abilities, Hyperion's armor is capable of self-repair and adaptation. It is unknown just how far the repair or adaptation can go, but there is the possibility that given enough time, Hyperion could not only adapt to his Voice's fighting style, but to his environment and enemies.

In addition to his teleportation and endlessly generating energy, Hyperion possesses several weapons stored within its forearms, including a trio of electrified prongs that fire out like a taser, three blades that surround the forearm in a triangular pattern and are capable of rotating once buried in an enemy, allowing for even more damage, and finally, a few small scale energy cannons. These energy cannons appear to be a replacement for the shoulder-mounted cannons on the bulkier form. Arguably its two most powerful weapons are the cannon that locks into place just above his head, also known as its Gunhead mode, and its hyper-focused chest beam, which killed Nemesis Prime in one hit. The chest energy blast was only shown in the flashback during ancient times for some reason and never used again. It is possible that the beam was an unknown feature when its Voice first fought with Hyperion and was simply phased out when the mech adapted to his Voice's fighting style, although this is unlikely. Gunhead appears to be far less powerful than the chest beam. Where the beam instantly killed Nemesis prime, Gunhead, struggled even damaging Neo-Prime and Ashtaroth. As mentioned earlier, these weapons, as well as the teleportation, use stored energy from the Rift Engine and if enough is depleted, Hyperion will cease to function until the Engine can generate enough energy to get Hyperion running again.

Unlike most Gestorumque, Hyperion appears to provide several benefits to its Voice. Hyperion has access to seemingly all electronics on the planet and is an incredibly powerful supercomputer all on its own, and he can provide this information to his Voice, giving them surveillance of the entire world. In addition, Hyperion, obviously, has access to the internet and can directly stream any information into his Voice's brain. For this reason, it is unlikely that its Voice was unaware of its chest beam during their first fight, and the fact that it was never used again is either a plot hole or some yet unexplained reason. Hyperion also provides his Voice with life support, allowing both the mech and its Voice to survive in space and underwater or any other atmosphere that is hostile to human life.

In terms of fighting style, Hyperion prefers to engage the enemy from a distance, using its energy cannons to wear down its opponent until melee combat is absolutely necessary. However, this isn't to say that Hyperion is unskilled at hand-to-hand combat. Under the influence of Maigo, its Voice, it was capable of fighting the physically stronger Lovecraft and sending it into retreat. Its most unique strategy would be that of the orbital drop, in which Hyperion teleports a short distance to grab its opponent and then teleport into the upper atmosphere. This action leaves Hyperion sufficiently drained of energy and most of its systems shut down as it falls back down to earth alongside the Kaiju enemy, which has most likely died from a lack of oxygen by that point. This is a risky move, since not only does Hyperion have to rely on his opponent as a heat shield, but because he only regains enough energy to teleport and save himself mere moments from hitting the ground and dying. The use of this in Project Legion also showcases that Hyperion's teleportations defy the laws of gravity, since teleporting only changes your position, not your momentum. Either the teleportations gradually reconstructs his atoms in order to slow his momentum and save him, though this is unlikely since his teleportation appears instantaneous, or the Rift Engine provides an anti-gravity effect when teleporting, this is most likely since the Rift Engine has showcased some form of gravity control before.

Hyperion by itself is unique, so it would be repetitive to list some of its specialized weapons here, however, there is one attribute of the mech that requires mention. Up until Project Legion, Hyperion is not sentient. It is a highly advanced Artificial Intelligence built to fight the Aeros, but it does not possess true sentience until Freeman, a techno-organic life form from another dimension infects it with a virus that provides it true sentience. From there, its consciousness bases itself off of its Voice, Maigo, and it no longer appears to need a Voice, acting on its own.

Hyperion has two book appearances, once in Project Hyperion as another weapon for humanity to use against the Aeros, and secondly in Project Legion, once again as a weapon for humanity. It is assumed dead alongside Nemesis at the end of the book, but apparently teleported away at the last second to Europa's oceans, where it recovered and eventually teleported away, supposedly off to explore the universe. It is currently unknown if more Mashintorum exist in the Ferox army, but it seems unlikely since none are present during the final battle, save for Hyperion, of course.

== Main series ==
The main series consists of five novels, starting with Project Nemesis and ending with Project Legion. Island 731 became canon and an origins novel Prime.

Order	Title	Author(s)	Publisher	Date	Pages	ISBN
0	Island 731	Jeremy Robinson	St. Martin's Press	March, 2013	384	1250162297
1	Project Nemesis	Jeremy Robinson	Breakneck Media	November, 2012	310	0988672561
2	Project Maigo	Jeremy Robinson	Breakneck Media	December, 2013	318	0984042393
3	Project 731	Jeremy Robinson	Breakneck Media	December, 2014	298	1941539025
4	Project Hyperion	Jeremy Robinson	Breakneck Media	September, 2015	324	0984042393
5	Project Legion	Jeremy Robinson	Breakneck Media	October, 2016	394	1941539165
6	Nemesis	Jeremy Robinson	Breakneck Media	November 20, 2023	422	1941539777

=== Book 0 - Island 731 ===
Exploring the mystery surrounding the physical and genetic experiments of Japan's Unit 731 during the Second World War, Island 731 sees Mark Hawkins stranded in a forgotten nightmare with creatures too horrific to imagine.

The Magellan, a research vessel in the Pacific Ocean, is mysteriously brought to a deserted island and with signs of habitation from the Second World War. When the crew start to disappear one by one, Hawkins starts to investigate. He finds them. Changed.

In the spirit of The Island of Dr. Moreau, Robinson brings his mysterious creature creations to horrifying life through the ongoing experiments of Unit 731.

=== Book 1 - Project Nemesis ===
When a massive ancient monster is discovered in a cave and its DNA is combined with that of young murder victim, Nemesis is reborn. The 300 foot tall Kaiju is driven to seek out and avenge injustice.

Jon Hudson of the Department of Homeland Security Fusion Center-P (Paranormal) accidentally becomes embroiled in the case of his life when he stumbles across secret genetic experiments in an abandoned missile base in the backwoods of Maine. With his trusted team attempts to do the impossible. Stop the devastation.

=== Book 2 - Project Maigo ===
In the wake of the destruction of Boston by Nemesis, John Hudson is finally being taken seriously by the DHS and the government in general. The resources and backing he receives is not enough to help when five new Kaiju attack and start to level cities. Nemesis could be humanities only hope, but she has retreated to the depths of the ocean.

The psychotic General Lance Gordon, who now has a piece of Nemesis's within his very body, seems capable of directing her to act. His target is Washington D.C.

=== Book 3 - Project 731 ===
Washington D.C. lies in ruins and Nemesis and Maigo are seemingly dead. Deep in the bowels of the research facility run by the Genetic Offense Directive (GOD) Tsuchi, the deadly spider-like monsters from Island 731, implant the corpse of Nemesis given rise to a new strain of mega-Tsuchi. Awoken from her near-death and seeking vengeance for her violation, Nemesis charges after the Tsuchi and toward Los Angeles.

This chapter of the story sees Hawkins, Lilly and Joliet from Island 731 join the expanding cast of characters in the Nemesis universe and in doing so positions Island 731 as an origins story in the Nemesis universe.

=== Book 4 - Project Hyperion ===
With Lilly and Maigo now living with Jon, now married and running FC-P out of Beverly, the family is growing. Out of the blue two giant new Kaiju drop from the sky. Lovecraft and Giger begin a rampage without mercy and Jon discovers that the Aeros have sent them in advance of their arrival.

The Queen of the Monster comes to Earth's defence, and with her new "voice" Katso Endo in the pilot's seat, she is more deadly than ever.

To aid mankind Maigo and Lilly travel to the Russian island of Big Diomede to unleash an ancient protector known as Hyperion, a mega-mech Kaiju. However, Nemesis struggles with the newest member of the team, as its memories invoke fear as it is uncovered the Nemesis Prime was killed by Hyperion the Kaiju killer.

The first battle for the fate of the human race begins. A battle that takes them to the Antarctic and an ancient citadel.

=== Book 5 - Project Legion ===
The Aeros have arrived.

The appearance of a stranger called Milos "Cowboy" Vesely sparks a multi-dimensional recruitment drive to find people willing to fight for all Earths against the Aeros. In addition to characters from the Nemesis Saga and Island 731, Project Legion includes characters and/or plot elements from many other Robinson novels include:

- Chess Team
- The Didymus Contingency
- MirrorWorld
- SecondWorld / Nazi Hunter: Atlantis
- Xom-B
- Raising the Past
- The Last Hunter (The Antarktos Saga)

== Graphic novels and comics ==
=== Nemesis Saga ===
Between 2015 and 2016, American Gothic Press and IDW Publishing published a series of comics based on the Nemesis Saga and Island 731.

Title	Author	Artist	Publisher	Date	Note
Project Nemesis #1	Jeremy Robinson	Matt Frank	American Gothic Press	October 7, 2015	Available in two covers by Matt Frank and Bob Eggleton. A Famous Monsters Presents title
Project Nemesis #2	Jeremy Robinson	Matt Frank	American Gothic Press	November 18, 2015	A Famous Monsters Presents title
Project Nemesis #3	Jeremy Robinson	Matt Frank	American Gothic Press	Unknown	A Famous Monsters Presents title
Project Nemesis #4	Jeremy Robinson	Matt Frank	American Gothic Press	March 16, 2016	A Famous Monsters Presents title
Project Nemesis #5	Jeremy Robinson	Matt Frank	American Gothic Press	Unknown	A Famous Monsters Presents title
Project Nemesis #6	Jeremy Robinson	Matt Frank	American Gothic Press	June 22, 2016	A Famous Monsters Presents title
Island 731 #1	Jeremy Robinson, Kane Gilmour	Jeff Zornow	American Gothic Press	August 10, 2016	
Island 731 #2	Jeremy Robinson, Kane Gilmour	Jeff Zornow	American Gothic Press	October 12, 2016	

== Video games ==
=== Colossal Kaiju Combat ===
Colossal Kaiju Combat (Sunstone Games; 2012–2015) was a single and online multiplayer brawling engine featuring giant monsters ("kaiju") fighting in destructible environments. The game was crowd funded on Kickstarter. A planned The Fall of Nemesis expansion, would have seen Nemesis as the main antagonist and a playable "Boss" character. The game's premise was that the Kaijujin, mystical entities that embody the fundamental traits of Kaiju, are gathering giant monsters from across the multiverse and pitting them together to determine which is the strongest. The previous champion had been deposed by Nemesis, who is now the reigning champion of the Kaijujin's tournament. However, countless other Kaiju are coming forth to contend for the crown. In 2017, Jeremy Robinson confirmed that Sunstone Games had cancelled production.

== TV series ==
In May 2022, it was reported that the novel would be adapted into a television series for Sony Pictures Television with Chad Stahelski as director and executive producer.
