= Joan Baker =

American actress

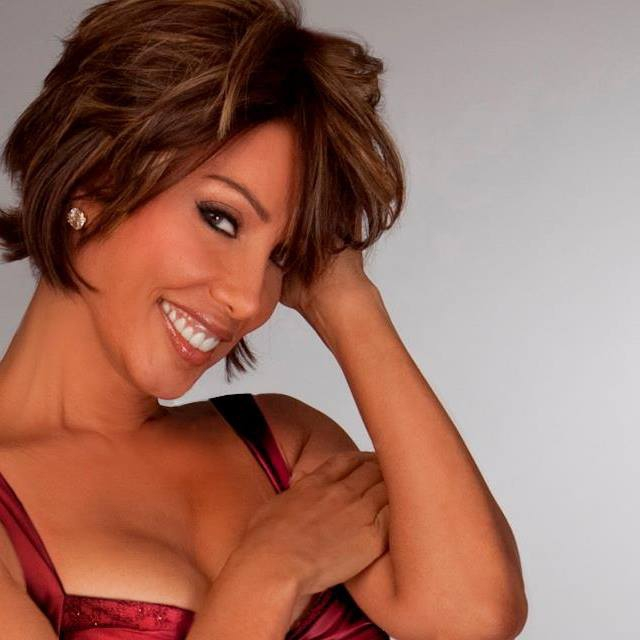
- Baker in 2007
- Born: San Francisco, California, U.S.
- Occupations: Actress, author
- Years active: 1970–present
- Spouse: Rudy Gaskins (m. 1998)

Joan Baker is an American actress and author. She is also the co-founder and vice president of the Society of Voice Arts and Sciences, a professional organization for voice-over artists. Baker's 2005 book, Secrets of Voice-Over Success, chronicles the careers of a number of America's top voice actors with the intent of providing career guidance to aspiring and existing voice-over professionals. Her credits include shows such as Saturday Night Live and Guiding Light, and she has done voice-overs for the anime film MD Geist and for the Grand Theft Auto series. Baker has also won multiple TellyAwards and Promax Awards for her work.

== Career ==
Baker began acting in local theater at the age of 10. After participating in the Marin County Shakespeare Festival for two years, she attracted the attention of the Brebner Agency, a talent agency in San Francisco. Shortly after signing with Brebner, Baker was cast in a local children's TV show called Whatchamacallit in 1972. She had also started to study dance and appeared in dance shows and joined the theater company at the Belrose Performing Arts Center.

In 1980, Baker received a scholarship to study dance at the Alvin Ailey American Dance Theater in New York City. She also continued to study acting and auditioned on Broadway. While struggling to make ends meet as an actor, Baker created a stage act in which she portrayed Josephine Baker. She created her portrayal in collaboration with one of Josephine's sons, Jean-Claude, who owned the Chez Josephine restaurant in New York's theater district. Baker's act was based out of Chez Josephine, but she also performed as Josephine Baker at nightclubs throughout the city. As she was contemplating stepping away from the act after for performing it for four years, Baker saw an ad in Backstage that made her decide to learn more about voice acting in order to diversify her skillset. After taking four lessons, she created a demo reel and sent it to several talent agents. She received immediate interest and ultimately signed with Don Buchwald and Associates. She began booking auditions and jobs steadily as a voice-over artist, including a documentary about the creation of the William J. Clinton Presidential Library that is part of the library's permanent display and a promotion campaign for the Muhammad Ali Center.

After about three years with the agency, a conversation that Baker overheard by chance led her to seek out a booking at ABC on her own initiative. She was soon hired to do voice-over for a women's health campaign at ABC News where Rudy Gaskins was a producer. Not only was the spot that Gaskins directed Baker on successful, but Baker and Gaskins began dating and eventually married in 1998. Baker's and Gaskins' careers became closely intertwined, as they were as much partners in business as they were in marriage. They began teaching voice-over, and in 2000, Baker and Gaskins co-founded Push Creative, an advertising agency most notable for the Emmy Award-winning NBC teaser campaign for the 2000 Summer Olympics.

In 2005, Baker published Secrets to Voice-over Success, a book in which she discussed her own experiences in the voice-over industry and interviewed a number of other voice-over professionals. Baker's idea for the book was born from a project for a class she was taking shortly after her father died from Alzheimer's disease in 2003. The goal of the project was to create something that impacted one's community. Baker chose the voice-over community as her focus, though she had also become determined to contribute to the cause of fighting Alzheimer's. She decided early on to contribute all of her book's royalties to the Alzheimer's Association, and two of the questions that she asked everyone she interviewed for the book were inspired directly by how her father losing his ability to speak had impacted her perspective on how people communicate. Baker and her contributors conducted a number of signing events to promote the book. The events were so well-attended that they were often held in hotel conference spaces, and the people attending were often seeking additional insight into how to start or advance their own voice acting careers. Recognizing a need within the voice-over community, Baker and Gaskins organized a first-of-its-kind conference for the industry in 2006 that, after a few different name changes, became the That's Voiceover! Career Expo.

In 2013, Baker and Gaskins co-founded the Society of Voice Arts and Sciences (SOVAS) as an outgrowth of the professional community that had been built around the career expo. The same year, the Voice Arts Awards were introduced as the capstone event for the expo. In her capacity as vice president of SOVAS, Baker has advocated for diversity and inclusion in the voice-over industry. Baker continues to perform as a voice-over artist as well as providing coaching and giving educational lectures about the art of voice-over as well as the industry itself. She is also the first voice-over artist to have an endorsement agreement with Neumann Mics. In 2022, Baker accepted a position as an adjunct professor at the Hartt Theatre Division at the University of Hartford and is developing the school's first voice acting curriculum.

== Bibliography ==
- Secrets of Voice-over Success. Sentient Publications ISBN 1-59181-033-7
