= Chess Team =

Series of science-fiction fantasy novels

- First edition cover of Pulse
- Author: Jeremy Robinson
- Country: United States
- Language: English
- Genre: Fantasy, military science fiction
- Publisher: St. Martin's Press / Breakneck Media / Seven Realms Publishing
- Published: 2009 – 2016
- Media type: Print (hardback & paperback), audiobook

Chess Team is a series of 20 military science-fiction fantasy novels written by American author Jeremy Robinson, featuring the ex-Delta Force operator, Jack Sigler.

== Premise ==
Formed under order from the President of the United States (Thomas Duncan), the Chess Team faces off against dangerous threats. Jack Sigler, callsign King, leads a team of operators picked from within the United States Special Forces. Tasked with anti-terrorism missions. America's elite soldiers are about to uncover one of history's deadliest secrets.

== Characters ==
=== Chess Team members ===
The core Chess Team consist of King, Queen, Rook, Bishop, Knight and their handler Deep Blue. Occasionally team members are added to operations and are given the designation Pawn with a number moniker (Pawn 1, Pawn 2, etc.)

== Main series ==
The main series consists of eight novels, starting with Pulse and ending with Empire, and an origins title, Prime.

Order	Title	Author(s)	Publisher	Pages	ISBN
0	Prime	Jeremy Robinson, Sean Ellis	Breakneck Media	286	0988672537
1	Pulse	Jeremy Robinson	St. Martin's Press	336	0312540280
2	Instinct	Jeremy Robinson	St. Martin's Press	368	0312540299
3	Threshold	Jeremy Robinson	St. Martin's Press	352	0312540302
4	Ragnarok	Jeremy Robinson, Kane Gilmour	Seven Realms Publishing	339	0983735093
5	Omega	Jeremy Robinson, Kane Gilmour	Breakneck Media	316	0988672545
6	Savage	Jeremy Robinson, Sean Ellis	Breakneck Media	339	1941539009
7	Cannibal	Jeremy Robinson, Sean Ellis	Breakneck Media	386	1941539033
8	Empire	Jeremy Robinson, Sean Ellis	Breakneck Media	366	1941539130

=== Prime (origins novel) ===
Prime is an origins novel published between Threshold and Ragnarok. It is now considered Book 0 in the series.

=== Pulse ===
When George Pierce finds the decapitated remains of the mythical Lernaean Hydra in a tomb beneath the Nazca plains surrounded by Greek texts he calls on Jack Sigler for help. Shortly after Jacks arrival a Gen-Y security team arrive from Manifold Genetics, killing archaeologist Dr. McCabe and taking the remains.

Richard Ridley and Manifold have plans for the Hydra: a serum capable of regenerating tissue with horrific consequences.

Pulse is the Chess Team's first adventure.

=== Instinct ===
The second book in the series sees the Chess Team operating in the jungles of Vietnam with Dr. Sara Fogg (Callsign: Pawn) of the Centers for Disease Control and Prevention (CDC). While being pursued by the Vietnamese People's Liberation Army Death Volunteers they must uncover the mystery of the Nguoi Rung.

Acting on information from George Pierce, King and Dr. Fogg travel to Siletz in Oregon and find it completely destroyed but for an eleven-year-old girl, Fiona Lane, the only survivor left behind by the legendary Hercules.

Deep Blue's true identity is revealed to the team.

=== Threshold ===
Since the events of Instinct, King must raise Fiona Lane, the sole survivor of an attack in the Siletz reservation. When King receives a call that his mother has died, he goes to attend her funeral. After meeting his father for the seemingly first time and discovering that his mother had faked her death, King learns the truth about his parents’ past. While the rest of Chess Team is sent on a mission, their base, Fort Bragg is attacked by a mysterious force and Fiona is kidnapped. Richard Ridley has returned, seeking to eliminate the last of the world's known speakers of ancient languages, including Fiona. Teaming up with Alexander Diotrephes, the mythical Hercules, Chess Team races to stop Ridley from harnessing the Mother Tongue and destroying mankind. Meanwhile, Tom Duncan makes plans to exit his presidency and devout his time to his role as Deep Blue.

The novel explores the concept of the universal language.

=== Ragnarok ===
Since the events of Threshold, the Chess Team, spread across the globe and struggling to reunite, must stop an otherworldly foe that is destroying portions of the earth.

The Norse wolf deity, Fenrir, appears as the mastermind behind these events.

King learns of the existence of Asya, a sister he never knew he had.

=== Omega ===
King and Asya, race to rescue their parents from Alexander Diotrephes, under the impression that they have been kidnapped. Discovering their parents alive, well and unharmed, King learns a startling truth about his family. Alexander and King are transported back in time to 799 B.C. Chess Team is approached by three clones of Richard Ridley to rescue the real Ridley, who still lives and is being held captive by Alexander. Forming a tenuous alliance, Chess Team and the clones travel to Carthage and rescue their nemesis, only to be met with immediate betrayal. Chess Team faces a challenge like never before as the final battle with Richard Ridley begins. Meanwhile, King helps Alexander in a quest to save his wife, Acca, from an unfortunate demise, and must later travel through history to return to the present.

=== Savage ===
Joseph Mulamba, president of the Democratic Republic of the Congo, has been kidnapped while attempting to find the missing pages of Henry Morton Stanley's diary. Wanting to make Africa a better place for all, Mulamba believes whatever Stanely discovered in his expeditions, which are detailed in his diary, holds the key to this. While searching for Mulamba, the Chess Team faces the rebel army, the African military, and a deadly mercenary named Monique Favreau, the Red Queen.

This is the final Chess Team novel to feature Erik Somers. Asya takes his place as ‘Bishop’.

=== Cannibal ===
While on mission to capture the leader of the El Sol drug cartel, Chess Team is thrown into a challenge unlike anything they have ever faced. Senator Lance Marrs joins forces with the cartel's leader, Hector Beltran, to take down Chess Team and unmask their identites. Meanwhile, King's fiancée, CDC disease detective Sara Fogg, must discover the origins of a disease that dates back to the Lost Colony of Roanoke, the death of its settlers and the modern threat whose power is about to spread across the globe. Tom Duncan makes the decision to surrender himself to ensure Chess Team's freedom at the cost of his own.

=== Empire ===
Following the events of Cannibal, Chess Team are now wanted and on the run. While searching for Tom Duncan, whom they have not seen or heard from for several months, they are sent to Russia to prevent a potential world war. At the same time, King, Asya and their parents search for evidence that Julie Sigler, King's sister long thought to have been dead, is still alive and working for their enemies. The team uncovers a plot establish a global empire while battling sub-zero temperatures, monstrosities born from Cold War experiments and an ancient, yet powerful enemy.

== Novellas ==
=== Chesspocalypse ===
The Chesspocalypse series of novellas occurs between the events of Threshold and Ragnarok while the members of Chess Team are scattered around the world.

Order	Title	Author(s)	Publisher	Pages	ISBN
3.1	Callsign: King	Jeremy Robinson, Sean Ellis	Breakneck Media	188	0983601771
3.2	Callsign: Queen	Jeremy Robinson, David Wood	Breakneck Media	112	0983601798
3.3	Callsign: Rook	Jeremy Robinson, Edward G. Talbot	Breakneck Media	110	098404230X
3.4	Callsign: King, Underworld	Jeremy Robinson, Sean Ellis	Breakneck Media	186	0984042318
3.5	Callsign: Bishop	Jeremy Robinson, David McAfee	Breakneck Media	122	0984042326
3.6	Callsign: Knight	Jeremy Robinson, Ethan Cross	Breakneck Media	136	0984042342
3.7	Callsign: Deep Blue	Jeremy Robinson, Kane Gilmour	Breakneck Media	144	0984042350
3.8	Callsign: King, Blackout	Jeremy Robinson, Sean Ellis	Breakneck Media	236	0984042377

=== Callsign: King ===
The Elephant Graveyard has been discovered, and with it a deadly secret. King and Sara Fogg are called in to investigate the mysterious disappearance of scientists within the area, but begin to suspect there's more to the event than meets the eye. Surviving an assassination attempt, King must protect geneticist Felice Carter, who holds the secret to the origins of modern man, from high-tech mercenary forces born of the remnants of Manifold Genetics, and contends with a mysterious enemy known as “Brainstorm”.

=== Callsign: Queen ===
While searching for Rook, Zelda Baker, callsign Queen, is redirected to Pripyat, Ukraine to investigate rumors that a splinter cell of Manifold Genetics is conducting a secret project within the area. While fending off Gen Y security soldiers and werewolf creatures dubbed “Oborots”, Queen ventures underground, beneath the ruins of Pripyat's amusement park and locates the hidden Manifold facility, led by Richard Ridley's estranged brother, Darius.

=== Callsign: Rook ===
Following a mission that claims the lives of his crew, Stan Tremblay, callsign: Rook, flees Siberia and finds seclusion in the seemingly tranquil town of Fenris Kystby, Norway. Upon arrival, he finds that not all is what it seems; the residents do not trust outsiders, a pack of wolves wander the tundra, a mysterious creature has been terrorizing the town, and the locals refuse to discuss the town's past. Despite the setbacks, Rook is determined to stop the creature murdering the townspeople, and soon uncovers the town's sinister past, dating back to World War II.

=== Callsign: King, Underworld ===
In Arizona, King and George Pierce are investigating an attack by an unknown creature. They soon discover something which is far more sinister at hand, as they are pursued by the mythical Mogollon Monsters and a legendary hitman. Later they stumble upon an experiment that can put the whole world at risk. And at the center of it all is an old enemy: Brainstorm.

=== Callsign: Bishop ===
Erik Somers, callsign Bishop, is sent to Iran to combat a group of terrorists that have acquired a weaponized variant of the lethal compound, Ergot-B, and discovers that Dawoud Abbasi, the terrorist leader intending to unleash Ergot-B upon the world, is his biological father. Bishop, along with a Delta operative known as Callsign: Joker, race against time to stop Dawoud's plans, while Bishop also seeks answers about his past.

=== Callsign: Knight ===
Shin Dae-Jung, callsign: Knight, is called from his vacation in Thailand to a mission in Shenhuang, a ghost city in China, to investigate the mysterious disappearance of a Delta squad. Upon arrival, the Osprey carrying him is hit by an EMP blast, forcing them into a crash landing. As Knight scours the abandoned town for signs of life, he encounters two children, who warn him of a monster prowling the city. When the wounded Osprey pilot is killed, Knight encounters the culprit: a humanoid monstrosity with regenerative abilities and an appearance reminiscent of the Lernaean Hydra, a creature Knight faced once before. Teaming up with SAS soldiers and Anna Beck, a former member of Manifold Genetics's Gen-Y security force, Knight must defend against a foe who will follow its objective of eliminating its foes to the end, and must uncover a conspiracy behind an illegal experimentation program.

=== Callsign: Deep Blue ===
Thomas Duncan, callsign: Deep Blue and his security force attempt to convert Manifold Genetics's former Alpha facility into Chess Team's secret headquarters, but must contend with invading Gen-Y soldiers, mutated salamanders, and a bomb that threatens to destroy the facility.

=== Callsign: King, Blackout ===
Graham Brown, the mastermind behind Brainstorm, has surfaced in Paris, giving King the opportunity to finally capture him. Having teamed up with cyber hacker, Bandar Pradesh, Brown, using newfound technology, intends to plunge the entire world into literal darkness. But in an unexpected turn of events, Pradesh, a cult member who seeks the destruction of the world, uses this technology to awaken a dormant micro black hole and, within it, a demonic entity. Facing threats on all sides, King, along with Sara Fogg, Fiona Lane and Alexander Diotrephes, must defeat this ancient enemy before dawn's first light.

=== Continuum ===
The Continuum series of novella follows Jack Siglers progression through the pages of history as an immortal after being transported back in time during the events of Omega. For 2,814 years, King travels the globe, righting wrongs and generally attempting to stay out of the history books.

Order	Title	Author(s)	Publisher	Pages	ISBN
5.1	Guardian	Jeremy Robinson, J. Kent Holloway	Breakneck Media	182	0988672596
5.2	Patriot	Jeremy Robinson, J. Kent Holloway	Breakneck Media	188	1941539106
5.3	Centurion	Jeremy Robinson, J. Kent Holloway	Breakneck Media	143	1941539238

==== Guardian ====
Guardian is set during the time of the Babylonian Empire. The immortal Jack Sigler battles the ancient Tiamat for the life of a small boy.

==== Centurion ====
Centurion is set during the fall of Constantinople. Sigler, now a Roman Legionnaire, must battle an ancient curse.

==== Patriot ====
Patriot is set during the American Revolution. Sigler has assumed the mantle of the legendary pirate Lanme Wa. An expedition commissioned by George Washington himself raises him and seeks his help on a threat to the fledgling Americas.

== Universe novels ==
=== Cerberus Group ===
The Cerberus Groups series follows the ongoing exploits of George Pierce and the Herculean Society.

Order	Title	Author(s)	Publisher	Pages	ISBN
1	Herculean	Jeremy Robinson, Sean Ellis	Breakneck Media	362	1941539068
2	Helios	Jeremy Robinson, Sean Ellis	Breakneck Media	339	1941539262

=== Herculean ===
Following Alexander Diotrephes's departure from Earth, George Pierce has assumed the role as leader of the Herculean Society, an organization founded by Alexander to conceal ancient relics from humanity and prevent humanity from learning the dangerous truth behind the legends. While exploring the ancient Labyrinth, Pierce and his niece, Fiona Lane, discover a hoard of relics collected by Alexander, and are attacked by Cerberus, and shadowy organization who seeks the power of the Well of Monsters. Escaping unharmed, Pierce must recruit a team of experts including geneticist Felice Carter, mythology professor Augustina Gallo, high tech hacker Cintia Dourado and the previously believed to be dead Erik Somers, now known as Lazarus. Following in Alexander's footsteps, Pierce and his team use their knowledge of science, history and mythology in their race against time to stop Cerberus.

== Guides and compendiums ==
Title	Author(s)	Publisher	Pages	ISBN
Endgame: A Jack Sigler & Chess Team Universe Guidebook	Jeremy Robinson, Kane Gilmour	Breakneck Media	234	1941539041

=== Endgame ===
Jeremy Robinson and Kane Gilmour, the duo behind Ragnarok and Omega, bring this guidebook and a short story framing sequence for Chess Team fans wanting the next book in the series.

The book contains twenty original illustrations of the main characters by Christian Guldager, as well as a section of "eyewitness sketches" of creatures and events by Jeremy Robinson and fans of the series. The book is also wrapped in a short story about the team's handler, Deep Blue, which reveals the aftermath of the new novel Cannibal.

== Related work ==
Chess Team make an appearance in several other novels either as direct appearances or referenced by name.

Title	Author(s)	Publisher	Pages	ISBN
The Divide	Jeremy Robinson	Breakneck Media	370	1941539351
UNITY	Jeremy Robinson	Breakneck Media	430	1941539181
Project Legion	Jeremy Robinson	Breakneck Media	394	1941539165
Dogs of War	Jonathan Maberry	Griffin Press	544	1250098483
Joe Ledger: Unstoppable	Jonathan Maberry	St. Martin's Press	416	1250090806
SNAFU: Survival of the Fittest	Anthology	Cohesion Press	334	0994302932

=== The Divide ===
This novel is set in a possible future timeline in the Chess Team universe.

=== Unity ===
This novel is set in a possible future timeline in the Chess Team universe.

=== Project Legion ===
This novel, the last in the Nemesis Saga, dances across the rift between parallel Earths bringing together many of Robinson's characters including members of Chess Team.

=== Dogs of War ===
Jack Sigler and the Chess Team are discussed in the ninth Joe Ledger series book Dogs of War by Jonathan Maberry.

=== Joe Ledger: Unstoppable ===
Jeremy Robinson contributed the short story "Prince of Peace" to the Joe Ledger anthology work Unstoppable by Jonathan Maberry, which sees Joe Ledger and Jack Sigler from Chess Team working together.

=== "SNAFU: Survival of the Fittest" ===
In this anthology short story, Chess Team battle giant mutant worms.

== Film and television ==
As of 2015, the Chess Team novels, starting with Pulse, are in development as a feature film series with Emmy Award-winning director Jabbar Raisani.
