= David Wright (writer) =

American writer

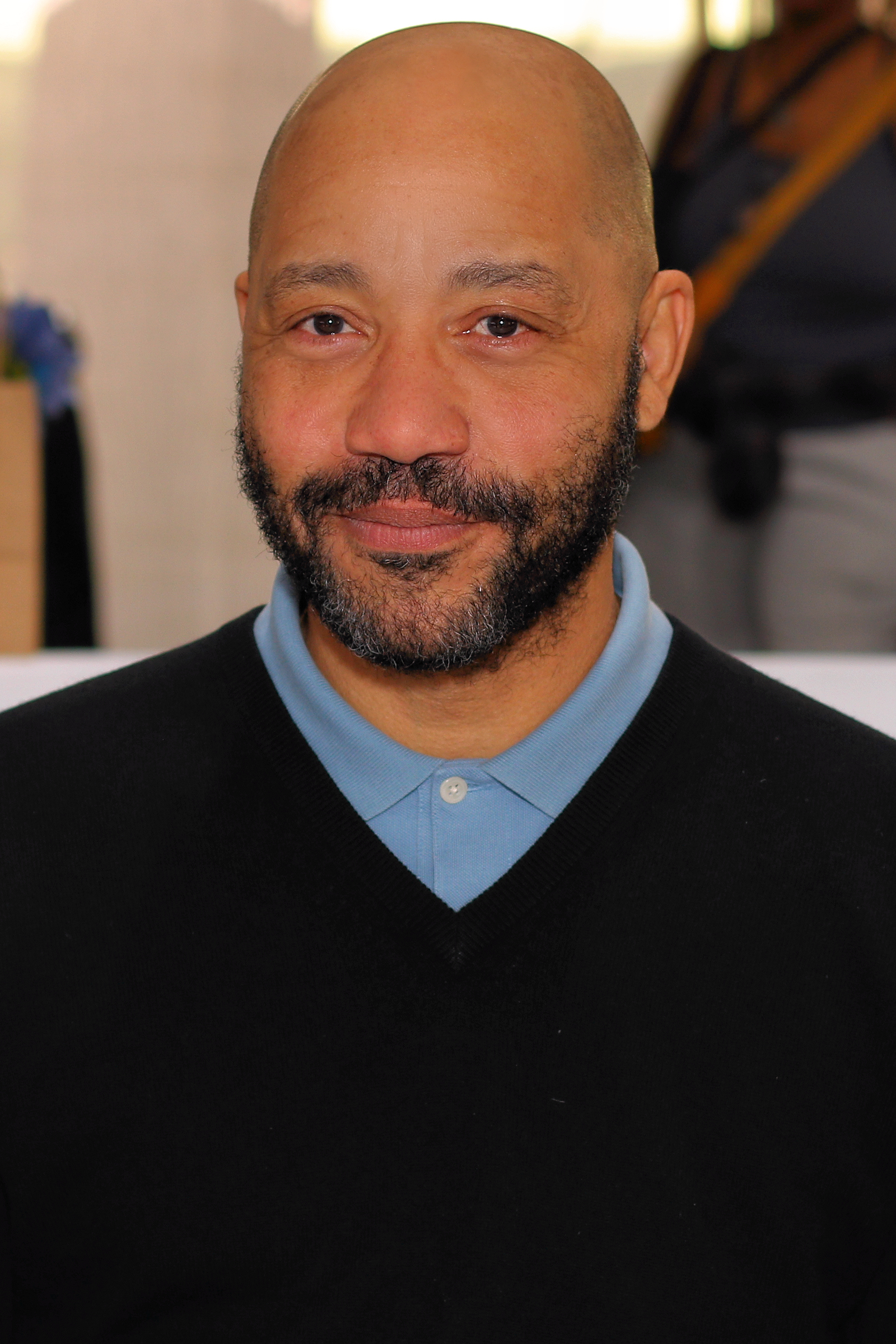
- Wright at the 2025 Texas Book Festival.
- Education: Carleton College (BA); University of Massachusetts Amherst College of Humanities and Fine Arts (MFA)
- Occupations: Professor, writer
- Writing career
- Language: English

David Wright is an American writer.

== Early life and education ==
Wright grew up in Borger, Texas. His mother is a white Jewish woman who survived the Nazi occupation of Paris. Her parents were affluent, assimilated French Jews. His mother was a member of the French Communist Party; she immigrated to the US in the 1950s as the GI bride of an African-American soldier. He holds a BA from Carleton College and an MFA from the MFA Program for Poets & Writers at the University of Massachusetts Amherst. He also studied at the École des Hautes Études en Sciences Sociales. Before he started teaching creative writing, he was a player/coach on various American football teams in Paris and London. He teaches at the University of Illinois at Urbana-Champaign, but lives in Texas.

He has also published under the name "David Wright Faladé," in honor of his biological father, Max Faladé, from Porto-Novo in Benin, the grandson of Béhanzin, the last King of Dahomey.

== Works ==
=== Books ===
- The New Internationals, Grove Press, January, 2025.
- Black Cloud Rising, Atlantic Monthly Press, February 2022.
- Bouchard, Luc; Wright, David (April 12, 2016). Away Running. Victoria, British Columbia: Orca Books. ISBN 978-1-4598-1048-8. OCLC 913176274.
- Wright, David; Zoby, David (2002). Fire on the Beach: Recovering the Lost Story of Richard Etheridge and the Pea Island Lifesavers. New York: Oxford University Press. ISBN 0-19-515484-3. OCLC 49284293.

=== Short stories ===
- "The Sand Banks, 1861" (2020)

=== Documentary film ===
- Rescue Men: The Story of the Pea Island Lifesavers (2010).

=== Television journalism ===
- "The Pea Island Story", co-written and co-produced with Stephanie Frederic and David Zoby. Aired on BET Tonight, February 1999.

== Awards ==
- 2017: International Board on Books for Young People, grades 9–12, Away Running
- 2011: Fulbright U.S. Scholar Program, Universidade de São Paulo, Brazil.
- 2009: North Carolina Humanities Council, Large Grant, for production of Rescue Men: The Story of the Pea Island Lifesavers.
- 2005: Dobie-Paisano Fellowship, University of Texas and the Texas Institute of Letters.
- 2004: Tennessee Williams Scholar, Sewanee Writers’ Conference.
- 1999: National Endowment for the Humanities, Summer Institute for College and University Faculty Fellow, W. E. B. Du Bois Institute for Afro-American Research, Harvard University, "The Civil Rights Movement: History and Consequences".
- 1997–1998: Chancellor's Minority Postdoctoral Fellowship, Afro-American Studies and Research Program, University of Illinois at Urbana-Champaign.
- 1994: Zora Neale Hurston/Richard Wright Award, the Zora Neale Hurston/Richard Wright Foundation, Fairfax, VA.
- 1993: Paul Cuffe Memorial Fellowship, Munson Institute of American Maritime Studies, Mystic, Connecticut.
