= Jeremy Robinson =

American writer (born 1974)

- Born: October 22, 1974 (age 51); Beverly, Massachusetts, U.S.
- Occupation: Novelist
- Spouse: Hilaree Robinson
- Writing career
- Pen name: Jeremy Bishop; Kutyuso Deep; Jeremiah Knight; Ike Onsoomyu
- Period: 2005–present
- Genres: Thriller, Science fiction, Action-adventure, Action-thriller, Adventure, Fantasy, Techno-thriller
- Notable works: Antarktos series Chess Team series Nemesis series Infinite Timeline series
- Website: bewareofmonsters.com

Jeremy Robinson (born October 22, 1974), also known by his pen names Jeremy Bishop and Jeremiah Knight, is an American author. He is known for mixing elements of science, history, and mythology. Many of his novels have been adapted into comic books, optioned for film and TV, and translated into thirteen languages. He is the author of the Nemesis Saga, the Chess Team series, and the non-fiction title, The Screenplay Workbook (2003, Lone Eagle Press).

== Personal life ==
Robinson was born in Beverly, Massachusetts, where he lived until he was 20. He resides in New Hampshire with his wife and three children, where he works as a full-time writer.

Robinson is a gamer and his experiences while gaming with a group of friends formed the basis for his 2018 novel Space Force, which is loosely based on the Battle Royale game format and features many tropes from that genre.

=== Career ===
Robinson's career as a writer started out in comic books with several stints on indie comics. After that he wrote screenplays, several of which were produced, optioned or in development (including the screenplay version of The Didymus Contingency). His switch to book writing came with The Screenplay Workbook in 2003. He has since written over sixty novels, which are available in twelve languages, including the Nemesis Saga and the Chess Team series published by Thomas Dunne Books, an imprint of St. Martin's Press. Robinson is a former director of New Hampshire AuthorFest, a non-profit organization promoting literacy in New Hampshire.

In September 2025, according to Robinson in an interview with Paul Semel, there will be a new shared universe of standalone novels for the following years, making the second literary universe after the Infinite Timeline.

== Works ==
Robinson's fiction writing includes several series:

- Origins series (2005–2010)
- Antarktos Saga (2007–2017)
- Chess Team series (2010–2024)
- Jane Harper trilogy (2011–2025)
- Nemesis Saga (2012–2023)
- SecondWorld duology (2012–2013)
- Infinite Timeline (2013–2023)
- Refuge series (2013–2014)
- Hunger trilogy (2015–2023)
- Good Boys trilogy (2024–2025)

He has also written thirteen standalone novels; short stories; and fictional guidebooks.

His comics include works published by American Gothic Press (2015–2016), IDW Publishing (2016), and Breakneck Comics and Vault Comics (2026). He contributed writing to a video game, Colossal Kaiju Combat: Kaijuland Battles, which was in development by Sunstone Games but then cancelled.

=== Beware of Monsters ===
Beware of Monsters is Robinson's official website providing information about his novels, short fiction, comics, adaptations, and other creative projects. The website also serves as a central source for information about Robinson's publishing activities and his independently developed fictional properties.

=== Breakneck Media ===
Breakneck Media is a publishing and production imprint associated with Jeremy Robinson's fiction. The imprint has been used for the publication and distribution of Robinson's novels and audiobooks, including works associated with the Antarktos Saga, Nemesis Saga, Infinite Timeline, and other projects. Robinson's bibliography identifies Breakneck Media as a publisher or distributor for numerous works dating from the early 2010s onward.

=== Breakneck Comics ===
Breakneck Comics is a comics publishing and production venture established by Robinson as an extension of Breakneck. Robinson, who worked as an artist before becoming a novelist, created the imprint to develop original comic-book and graphic-novel projects. The initial publishing program consisted of five graphic novels: Excommunicated, Nectar, 1001 Saves the World, Grotesque, and a comics adaptation of Project Nemesis.

In 2025, Robinson announced a partnership between Breakneck Comics and Vault Comics, under which the companies would co-publish the Breakneck titles. Robinson described his role as concentrating on storytelling and art direction, while Vault would handle publishing, distribution, and marketing. The first title in the program, Nectar, was scheduled to begin publication in 2026, followed by the remaining projects.

Breakneck Comics therefore represents an expansion of Robinson's work from prose fiction into creator-owned comics and graphic novels, while Breakneck Media encompasses his broader independent publishing activities. Beware of Monsters functions as the principal online platform through which Robinson provides information about these projects and his wider body of work.
