= Voice Arts Awards =

Voice-over and voice acting industry awards

- Awarded for: Artistry and technical merit within the voice-over and voice acting industry
- Country: United States
- Presented by: Society of Voice Arts and Sciences
- First award: August 17, 2013; 13 years ago
- Website: sovas.org

The Voice Arts Awards are awards for artistry and technical merit within the voice-over and voice acting industry. They are presented annually by the Society of Voice Arts and Sciences (SOVAS), in recognition of excellence in voice-over achievements as assessed by a panel of industry peers. Winners are announced at the awards gala held in conjunction with the annual That's Voiceover! Career Expo.

The first Voice Arts Award was presented to Keith David in 2013, and the first full awards ceremony was held in 2014. It is modeled after other American entertainment awards such as the Oscars and the Emmys.

== History ==
The first Voice Arts Award was presented to Keith David on August 17, 2013 at the Directors Guild of America. The first full awards ceremony was held on November 9, 2014, at the Museum of the Moving Image in Queens, New York as the keynote event of the That's Voiceover! Career Expo. The award was created by Rudy Gaskins, Joan Baker, and Steve Ulrich, who recognized the need for specific acknowledgement of the achievements and contributions of voice artists across all forms of media. The awards ceremony continues to be held annually as a separately-ticketed gala event in conjunction with the That's Voiceover! conference.

== Statuette ==
The Voice Arts Award statuette depicts a microphone and copy stand, the two objects at the heart of voice-over, united by a teardrop shape. SOVAS partnered with the R.S. Owens & Company to design and manufacture the Voice Arts Award statuette.

== Process ==
Entries for the Voice Arts Awards may be submitted by individual artists or by companies and must be "created using the human voice as a primary element for communicating the intent, purpose, engagement, and experience to be derived from the work". The entries for most categories must have been published within an eligibility period that generally comprises the previous year as well as a portion of the current year leading up to the event. Several awards have multiple, designated language categories in English, Spanish, Arabic, Portuguese, African English, Japanese and Mandarin. There are also a number of "international" awards which may have submissions in Spanish, English, French, Portuguese, German, Italian, Hindi, Mandarin, Arabic or Japanese. Nominations and winners are both determined by the vote of a panel of industry peers and general consumers. Industry jurors for the Voice Arts Awards include voice actors, producers, casting directors, creative directors, critics, bloggers, and content creators. Additionally, 10 percent of the total jurors are avid consumers of the types of media being judged.

=== Nomination and voting ===
Nominees are determined by the highest-scoring entries of all qualified entries in a category, as determined by a panel of jurors. Depending on the number of entries, this may take up to three rounds of scoring. Most categories will have five nominees, though some more popular categories may have up to 10. Winners are then selected through a subsequent round of judging from among the nominees.

Seven jurors are assigned to assess each entry in both the nomination process and winner selection process, allowing for up to two jurors to recuse themselves in case of a conflict of interest. Jurors evaluate entries independently. They are not able to see other jurors' scores nor are they permitted to discuss the entries with other jurors.

Jurors use a judging portal to evaluate entries and submit their scores. The services of the accounting firm of Schulman Lobel, CPAs, are used to monitor and verify the balloting process. They are also responsible for the creation and sealing of the winner envelopes and maintain secure custody of those envelopes until they are handed off one by one to announce the winners at the awards ceremony.

== Merit categories ==
The Voice Arts Awards presents awards in over 120 merit categories in which entries undergo a juried balloting process. These categories cover 22 distinct media types and proficiencies:

- Animation
- Mobile Apps
- Audio Description
- Audiobooks
- Audio Engineering
- Body of Work
- Casting
- Commercials (TV, streaming, and radio)
- Demos
- Directing
- Dubbing
- Movie Trailer
- Narration
- Podcast
- Political
- Producer
- Promo
- Radio Imaging
- Spoken Word
- Toys
- Video Games
- Website

== Special categories ==
The Voice Arts Awards also presents a number of honors which are presented to recognize specific career achievements. These honors do not undergo the same juried balloting process as the merit awards, and not all are presented every year. These honors include:

- Lifetime Achievement
- Voice Arts Icon
- Voice Arts Influencer
- Backstage Vanguard Award
- Environmental Award
- Legacy Award
- Muhammad Ali Voice of Humanity Honor

Among the honorees in these categories are James Earl Jones, Jennifer Hale, Ken Burns, Nancy Cartwright, Keith David, Tara Strong, Rosario Dawson, William Shatner, Sigourney Weaver, Michael Buffer, Mark Hamill, Phil LaMarr, Jim Cummings, and Dr. Henry Louis Gates, Jr., among others.

=== Muhammad Ali Voice of Humanity Honor ===
The Society of Voice Arts and Sciences created the Muhammad Ali Voice of Humanity Honor in 2016. The award was created in collaboration with the Muhammad Ali Center and is presented to "an individual whose voice, through humanitarianism, activism or personal sacrifice, has made a decidedly positive impact on our national or global condition as a society." Sculptor Marc Mellon created the bronze sculpture for the award, which depicts Ali mid-speech. Recipients of the honor include Dr. Henry Louis Gates, Ken Burns, Vance Jones, Lonnie Ali, Stacey Abrams, Wes Studi, and Manuela Testolini.
