= American Gothic Press =

American comic book imprint

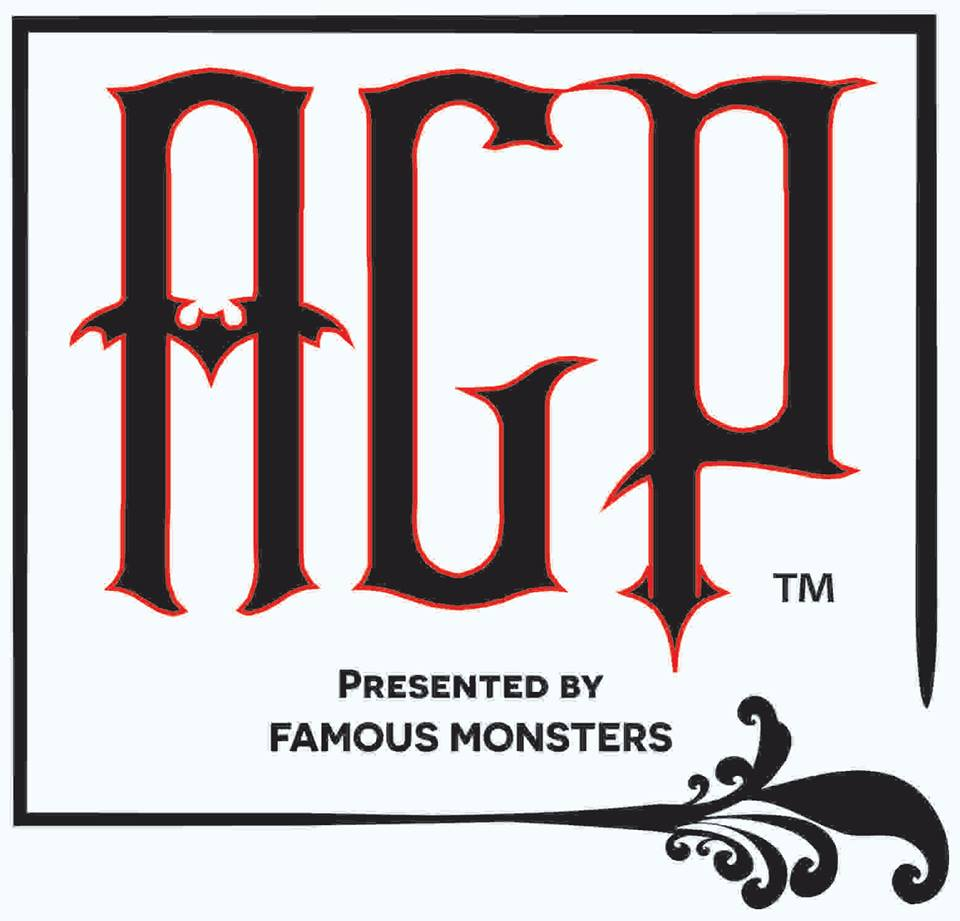
- Parent company: Famous Monsters of Filmland
- Founded: March 4, 2015
- Founder: Philip Kim
- Country of origin: United States
- Headquarters location: Petaluma, California
- Key people: Holly Interlandi (Editor-in-Chief)
- Publication types: Comic books, graphic novels
- Fiction genres: Fantasy; Horror; Sci-Fi; Thriller
- Official website: http://www.americangothicpress.com

American Gothic Press (AGP) is an American comic book imprint of Famous Monsters of Filmland magazine. Established in 2015, it focuses predominantly on the kaiju, science fiction, fantasy, and horror genres, reflecting the tastes of Honorary Famous Monsters Editor-in-Chief Forrest J Ackerman.

AGP officially launched in June 2015 with Gunsuits, a four-issue science fiction limited series. In 2016, AGP obtained the license for Irwin Allen's classic TV series Lost in Space and published adaptations of the previously unseen teleplays written by Carey Wilber.

== Series ==
- Gunsuits, written by Paul Tobin and illustrated by P.J. Holden (2015)
- Bornhome, written by Paul Tobin and illustrated by Jeff Johnson (2015)
- Broken Moon, written by Steve Niles and illustrated by Nat Jones (2015)
- Project Nemesis (comic book adaptation), written by Jeremy Robinson and illustrated by Matt Frank (2015)
- Monster World, written by Philip Kim and Steve Niles, illustrated by Piotr Kowalski, and colored by Dennis Calero (2015)
- Irwin Allen's Lost in Space: The Lost Adventures, a six-issue series based on two unproduced Lost In Space scripts originally written for television by Carey Wilber, adapted by Holly Interlandi, and illustrated by Kostas Pantoulas and Patrick McEvoy (2016)
- Killbox, written by Tom Riordan and illustrated by Nathan Gooden (2016)
- Thin, written and illustrated by Jon Clark (2016)
- Gunsuits: Alix, a one-shot written by Philip Kim and Holly Interlandi and illustrated by Dennis Calero (2016)
- Broken Moon: Legends of the Deep, written by Philim Kim and Ben Meares and illustrated by Nat Jones (2016)
- Invisible Hands, written by Laszlo Tamasfi and illustrated by Michael Malatini (2017)
- Killbox: Chicago, written by Tom Riordan and illustrated by Marco Ferrari (2017)

== Other titles ==
- Tales From the Acker-Mansion, a hardcover anthology of graphic short stories to honor Forrest J Ackerman, with stories by John Carpenter, Richard C. Matheson, John 5, Dan DiDio, William F. Nolan, Cullen Bunn, Joe R. Lansdale, and others (2016)
