= Audie Award for Audiobook of the Year =

Audio Publishers Association annual award for best audiobook

The Audie Award for Audiobook of the Year is one of the Audie Awards presented annually by the Audio Publishers Association (APA). It has been awarded since 2004.

== Winners and finalists ==
=== 2000s ===
Year	Audiobook	Author(s)	Narrator(s)	Publisher	Result	Ref.
2004 9th	Harry Potter and the Order of the Phoenix (2003)	J. K. Rowling	Jim Dale	Random House Audio	Winner	
2004 9th	A Patriot's Handbook	Caroline Kennedy	Caroline Kennedy, James Earl Jones, Vanessa Williams, Edward M. Kennedy, and full cast	Hyperion Audiobooks	Finalist	
2004 9th	David Sedaris Live at Carnegie Hall (2003)	David Sedaris	David Sedaris	Time Warner AudioBooks	Finalist	
2004 9th	The Complete Arkangel Shakespeare (1589–1614)	William Shakespeare	The Arkangel Cast	The Audio Partners Publishing Corp.	Finalist	
2004 9th	The John Cheever Audio Collection (1947–1964)	John Cheever	John Cheever, Blythe Danner, Peter Gallagher, Edward Herrmann, George Plimpton, and Meryl Streep	Caedmon/HarperAudio	Finalist	
2005 10th	My Life (2004)	Bill Clinton	Bill Clinton	Random House Audio	Winner	
2005 10th	A Series of Unfortunate Events: The Bad Beginning (1999)	Lemony Snicket	Tim Curry	HarperAudio	Finalist	
2005 10th	Ulysses (1918–1920)	James Joyce	Jim Norton and Marcella Riordan	Naxos AudioBooks, Ltd	Finalist	
2006 11th	The Hitchhiker's Guide to the Galaxy: Tertiary Phase (2004)	Douglas Adams	Simon Jones, Geoffrey McGivern, and full cast	BBC Audiobooks America	Winner	
2006 11th	Harry Potter and the Half-Blood Prince (2005)	J. K. Rowling	Jim Dale	Random House Audio	Finalist	
2006 11th	The Truth (With Jokes) (2005)	Al Franken	Al Franken	Brilliance Audio	Finalist	
2007 12th	Inspired by... The Bible Experience: New Testament (2007)	Media Group	Angela Bassett, Cuba Gooding Jr., Samuel L. Jackson, Blair Underwood, Denzel Washington, and full cast	Zondervan Publishing	Winner	
2007 12th	This I Believe: The Personal Philosophies of Remarkable Men and Women (2004)	Jay Allison and Dan Gediman	Bill Gates, Martha Graham, and full cast	Audio Renaissance	Finalist	
2007 12th	To Kill a Mockingbird (1960)	Harper Lee	Sissy Spacek	HarperAudio/Caedmon	Finalist	
2007 12th	World War Z (2006)	Max Brooks	Alan Alda, Mark Hamill, Carl Reiner, and full cast	Random House Audio	Finalist	
2008 13th	The Chopin Manuscript: A Serial Thriller (2007)	Lee Child, David Corbett, Joseph Finder, Jim Fusilli, John Gilstrap, James Grady, David Hewson, P. J. Parrish, and Jeffery Deaver	Alfred Molina	Audible	Winner	
2008 13th	Harry Potter and the Deathly Hallows (2007)	J. K. Rowling	Jim Dale	Random House/Listening Library	Finalist	
2008 13th	I Am America (And So Can You!) (2007)	Stephen Colbert	Stephen Colbert with Paul Dinello, Kevin Dorff, Greg Hollimon, Evie McGee, David Pasquesi, Allison Silverman, Brian Stack, and Jon Stewart	Hachette Audio	Finalist	
2008 13th	Inspired by... The Bible Experience: Old Testament (2007)	Media Group	Angela Bassett, Cuba Gooding Jr., Samuel L. Jackson, Blair Underwood, Denzel Washington, and full cast	Zondervan Publishing	Finalist	
2008 13th	The Invention of Hugo Cabret (2007)	Brian Selznick	Jeff Woodman	Scholastic Audio	Finalist	
2009 14th	The Graveyard Book (2008)	Neil Gaiman	Neil Gaiman	HarperAudio	Winner	
2009 14th	Brisingr (2008)	Christopher Paolini	Gerard Doyle	Listening Library	Finalist	
2009 14th	A Wolf at the Table (2008)	Augusten Burroughs	Augusten Burroughs	Macmillan Audio	Finalist	

=== 2010s ===
Year	Audiobook	Author	Narrator(s)	Publisher	Result	Ref.
2010 15th	Nelson Mandela's Favorite African Folktales (2002)	Nelson Mandela	Samuel L. Jackson, Whoopi Goldberg, and full cast	Hachette Audio	Winner	
2010 15th	The Time of My Life (2009)	Lisa Niemiand Patrick Swayze	Patrick Swayze	Simon & Schuster Audio	Finalist	
2010 15th	The Word of Promise Audio Bible (2009)	Nelson Bibles	Michael York, Richard Dreyfuss, Gary Sinise, and full cast	Thomas Nelson	Finalist	
2011 16th	Life (2010)	Keith Richards	Johnny Depp and Joe Hurley (feat. Keith Richards)	Hachette Audio	Winner	
2011 16th	The Woody Allen Collection (2010)	Woody Allen	Woody Allen	Audible	Finalist	
2011 16th	The Red Pyramid (2010)	Rick Riordan	Katherine Kellgren and Kevin P. Free	Audible	Finalist	
2012 17th	Bossypants (2011)	Tina Fey	Tina Fey	Hachette Audio	Winner	
2012 17th	Go the Fuck to Sleep (2011)	Adam Mansbach	Samuel L. Jackson	Audible/Brilliance Audio	Finalist	
2012 17th	American Gods (2001)	Neil Gaiman	Dennis Boutsikaris and full cast	HarperAudio	Finalist	
2012 17th	Steve Jobs (2011)	Walter Isaacson	Dylan Baker	Simon & Schuster Audio/Recorded Books	Finalist	
2013 18th	The End of the Affair (1951)	Graham Greene	Colin Firth	Audible	Winner	
2013 18th	American Grown: The Story of the White House Kitchen Garden and Gardens Across America (2012)	Michelle Obama	Michelle Obama, Jim Adams, Charlie Brandts, Christeta Comerford, Sam Kass, Bill Yosses, and full cast	Random House Audio	Finalist	
2013 18th	Beautiful Ruins (2012)	Jess Walter	Edoardo Ballerini	HarperAudio	Finalist	
2013 18th	Killing Kennedy: The End of Camelot (2012)	Bill O'Reilly and Martin Dugard	Bill O'Reilly	Macmillan Audio	Finalist	
2014 19th	Still Foolin' 'Em: Where I've Been, Where I'm Going, and Where the Hell Are My Keys? (2013)	Billy Crystal	Billy Crystal	Macmillan Audio	Winner	
2014 19th	The Testament of Mary (2012)	Colm Tóibín	Meryl Streep	Simon & Schuster Audio	Finalist	
2014 19th	The Things They Carried (1990)	Tim O'Brien	Bryan Cranston	Audible	Finalist	
2015 20th	Mandela: An Audio History (2014)	Nelson Mandela	Desmond Tutu, Nelson Mandela, and Joe Richman	HighBridge (Recorded Books)	Winner	
2015 20th	The Bully Pulpit: Theodore Roosevelt, William Howard Taft, and the Golden Age of Journalism (2013)	Doris Kearns Goodwin	Edward Herrmann	Simon & Schuster Audio	Finalist	
2015 20th	The Graveyard Book (2008)	Neil Gaiman	Neil Gaiman, Derek Jacobi, Robert Madge, Clare Corbett, Miriam Margolyes, Andrew Scott, Julian Rhind-Tutt, and full cast	HarperAudio	Finalist	
2015 20th	What I Know For Sure (2014)	Oprah Winfrey	Oprah Winfrey	Macmillan Audio	Finalist	
2015 20th	Yes Please (2014)	Amy Poehler	Amy Poehler, Carol Burnett, Seth Meyers, Mike Schur, Eileen and William Poehler, Patrick Stewart, and Kathleen Turner	HarperAudio	Finalist	
2016 21st	The Girl on the Train (2015)	Paula Hawkins	Clare Corbett, Louise Brealey, and India Fisher	Penguin Audio/Books on Tape	Winner	
2016 21st	Go Set a Watchman (2015)	Harper Lee	Reese Witherspoon	HarperAudio	Finalist	
2016 21st	The Nightingale (2015)	Kristin Hannah	Polly Stone	Macmillan Audio	Finalist	
2016 21st	The Water Diviner (2014)	Andrew Anastasios and Meaghan Wilson-Anastasios	Jack Thompson	Bolinda Audio	Finalist	
2017 22nd	Hamilton: The Revolution (2016)	Lin-Manuel Miranda and Jeremy McCarter	Mariska Hargitay, Lin-Manuel Miranda, and Jeremy Carter	Hachette Audio	Winner	
2017 22nd	Boys in the Trees (2015)	Carly Simon	Carly Simon	Macmillan Audio	Finalist	
2017 22nd	The Girl with the Lower Back Tattoo (2016)	Amy Schumer	Amy Schumer	Simon & Schuster Audio	Finalist	
2017 22nd	The Underground Railroad (2016)	Colson Whitehead	Bahni Turpin	Penguin Random House Audio/Books on Tape	Finalist	
2017 22nd	Year of Yes: How to Dance It Out, Stand in the Sun, and Be Your Own Person (2015)	Shonda Rhimes	Shonda Rhimes	Simon & Schuster Audio	Finalist	
2018 23rd	Lincoln in the Bardo (2017)	George Saunders	Nick Offerman, David Sedaris, George Saunders, and full cast	Random House Audio	Winner	
2018 23rd	Born a Crime: Stories from a South African Childhood (2016)	Trevor Noah	Trevor Noah	Audible	Finalist	
2018 23rd	Columbus Day: Expeditionary Force, Book 1 (2017)	Craig Alanson	R. C. Bray	Podium Publishing	Finalist	
2018 23rd	The Handmaid's Tale: Special Edition (1985)	Margaret Atwood and Valerie Martin	Claire Danes, Margaret Atwood, and full cast	Audible	Finalist	
2018 23rd	The Totally Unscientific Study of the Search for Human Happiness (2017)	Paula Poundstone	Paula Poundstone	HighBridge Audio (Recorded Books)	Finalist	
2019 24th	Children of Blood and Bone (2018)	Tomi Adeyemi	Bahni Turpin	Macmillan Audio	Winner	
2019 24th	An American Marriage (2018)	Tayari Jones	Eisa Davis and Sean Crisden	HighBridge Audio (Recorded Books)	Finalist	
2019 24th	Beastie Boys Book (2018)	Michael Diamond and Adam Horovitz	Michael Diamond, Adam Horovitz, and full cast	Penguin Random House Audio	Finalist	
2019 24th	Calypso (2018)	David Sedaris	David Sedaris	Hachette Audio	Finalist	
2019 24th	The Good Neighbor: The Life and Work of Fred Rogers (2018)	Maxwell King	LeVar Burton	Oasis Audio	Finalist	
2019 24th	I'll Be Gone in the Dark: One Woman's Obsessive Search for the Golden State Killer (2018)	Michelle McNamara	Gabra Zackman, Gillian Flynn, and Patton Oswalt	HarperAudio	Finalist	

=== 2020s ===
Year	Audiobook	Author(s)	Narrator(s)	Publisher	Result	Ref.
2020 25th	The Only Plane in the Sky: An Oral History of 9/11 (2019)	Garrett M. Graff	Holter Graham and full cast	Simon & Schuster Audio	Winner	
2020 25th	Angels in America: A Gay Fantasia on National Themes (1991)	Tony Kushner	Andrew Garfield, Nathan Lane, Susan Brown, Denise Gough, and full cast	Penguin Random House Audio	Finalist	
2020 25th	Becoming (2018)	Michelle Obama	Michelle Obama	Penguin Random House Audio	Finalist	
2020 25th	Charlotte's Web (1952)	E. B. White	Meryl Streep and full cast	Penguin Random House Audio	Finalist	
2020 25th	The Dutch House (2019)	Ann Patchett	Tom Hanks	HarperAudio	Finalist	
2020 25th	The Testaments: The Sequel to The Handmaid's Tale (2019)	Margaret Atwood	Ann Dowd, Bryce Dallas Howard, Mae Whitman, Derek Jacobi, Tantoo Cardinal, and Margaret Atwood	Penguin Random House Audio	Finalist	
2021 26th	Piranesi (2020)	Susanna Clarke	Chiwetel Ejiofor	Bloomsbury PLC	Winner	
2021 26th	The Decision: Overcoming Today's BS for Tomorrow's Success (2020)	Kevin Hart	Kevin Hart	Audible Originals	Finalist	
2021 26th	More Myself: A Journal (2020)	Alicia Keys	Alicia Keys	Macmillan Audio	Finalist	
2021 26th	The Mountains Sing (2020)	Nguyễn Phan Quế Mai	Quyen Ngo	Dreamscape	Finalist	
2021 26th	We're Better Than This (2020)	Elijah Cummings with James Dale	Nancy Pelosi, Laurence Fishburne, and Maya Rockeymoore Cummings	HarperAudio	Finalist	
2022 27th	Project Hail Mary (2021)	Andy Weir	Ray Porter	Audible Studios	Winner	
2022 27th	A Promised Land (2020)	Barack Obama	Barack Obama	Penguin Random House Audio	Finalist	
2022 27th	The Storyteller: Tales of Life and Music(2021)	Dave Grohl	Dave Grohl	HarperAudio	Finalist	
2022 27th	The Sweetness of Water (2021)	Nathan Harris	William DeMeritt	Hachette Audio	Finalist	
2023 28th	Finding Me (2022)	Viola Davis	Viola Davis	Harper Audio	Winner	
2023 28th	The 1619 Project: A New Origin Story (2021)	Nikole Hannah-Jones and The New York Times Magazine, edited by Caitlin Roper, Ilena Silverman, and Jake Silverstein	Nikole Hannah-Jones, January LaVoy and full cast	Penguin Random House Audio	Finalist	
2023 28th	Miracle and Wonder: Conversations with Paul Simon (2021)	Malcolm Gladwell and Bruce Headlam	Paul Simon, Malcolm Gladwell, and Bruce Headlam	Pushkin Industries	Finalist	
2023 28th	Remarkably Bright Creatures (2022)	Shelby Van Pelt	Marin Ireland and Michael Urie	HarperAudio	Finalist	
2023 28th	Wake: The Hidden History of Women-Led Slave Revolts (2022)	Tyler English-Beckwith (adapter), based on the graphic novel by Rebecca Hall and Hugo Martínez	DeWanda Wise, Chanté Adams, Jerrie Johnson, Folake Olowofoyeku, Bahni Turpin, and full cast	Podium Audio	Finalist	
2024 29th	Surrender	Bono	Bono	Penguin Random House Audio	Winner	
2024 29th	All the Sinners Bleed (2023)	S. A. Cosby	Adam Lazarre-White	Macmillan Audio	Finalist	
2024 29th	Inside Voice: My Obsession with How We Sound	Lake Bell	Lake Bell	Pushkin Industries	Finalist	
2024 29th	Sing a Black Girl's Song	Ntozake Shange, edited by Imani Perry, foreword by Tarana Burke	Alfre Woodard, D. Woods, and full cast	Hachette Audio	Finalist	
2024 29th	Tom Lake (2023)	Ann Patchett	Meryl Streep	HarperAudio	Finalist	
2025 30th	My Name Is Barbra (2023)	Barbra Streisand	Barbra Streisand	Penguin Random House Audio	Finalist	
2025 30th	George Orwell’s 1984	George Orwell, adapted by Joe White	Andrew Garfield, Cynthia Erivo, and full cast	Audible Originals	Finalist	
2025 30th	Playground	Richard Powers	Edoardo Ballerini, Robin Siegerman, and full cast	Spotify Audiobooks	Finalist	
2025 30th	Poor Deer	Claire Oshetsky	Sophie Amoss	HarperAudio	Finalist	
2025 30th	The Sing Sing Files	Dan Slepian	Dan Slepian	Macmillan Audio	Finalist	
2026 31st	Sunrise on the Reaping (2025)	Suzanne Collins	Jefferson White	Scholastic Audio	Winner	
2026 31st	The Devil Reached Toward the Sky	Garrett M. Graff	Edoardo Ballerini with Garrett M. Graff, Vikas Adam, Arthur Bishop, Nicholas Boulton, Carlotta Brentan, Matthew Bridges, Danny Campbell, Neo Cihi, Raphael Corkhill, Matthew Lloyd Davies, Vas Eli, Kevin R. Free, Mieko Gavia, Holter Graham, Adam Grupper, JD Jackson, Simon Jones, Caitlin Kelly, Elisabeth Lagalée, Saskia Maarleveld, Jefferson Mays, Dan John Miller, Mirai, Brian Nishii, Joy Osmanski, Lee Osorio, Mizuo Peck, Robert Petkoff, Jacques Roy, and Rob Shapiro	Simon & Schuster Audio	Finalist	
2026 31st	King of Ashes	S. A. Cosby	Adam Lazarre-White	Macmillan Audio	Finalist	
2026 31st	Pride and Prejudice (1813)	Jane Austen and Lulu Raczka	Marisa Abela, Harris Dickinson, Glenn Close, Marianne Jean-Baptiste, Bill Nighy, Sophie Wilde, Jessie Buckley, Toheeb Jimoh, Patricia Allison, Bertie Carvel, Leah Hazard, David Gyasi, Rosalind Eleazar, and a full cast	Audible Originals	Finalist	
2026 31st	Shield of Sparrows	Devney Perry	Samantha Brentmoor and Jason Clarke	Tantor Audio	Finalist	
2026 31st	Wild Dark Shore (2025)	Charlotte McConaghy	Saskia Maarleveld, Katherine Littrell, Cooper Mortlock, and Steve West	Macmillan Audio	Finalist	
