= Audio program =

Audio program may refer to:

- Audiobook
- Music album
- Radio program
- Secondary audio program, an alternative soundtrack on MTS stereo TV technology

== See also ==
- Category:Audio software
- Video program
- Audio Bible
