= Blair Underwood =

American actor (born 1964)

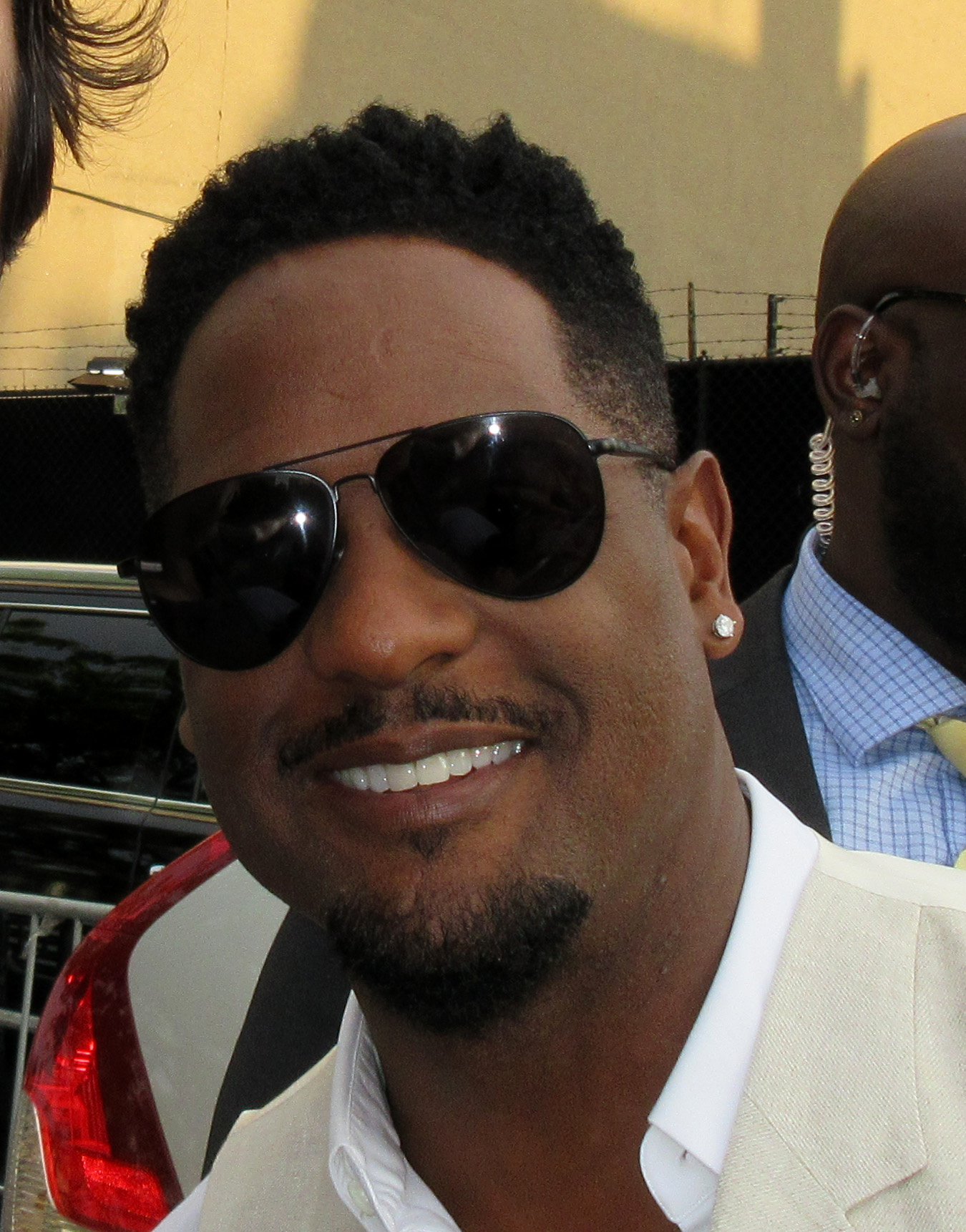
- Underwood in 2019
- Born: Blair Erwin Underwood; August 25, 1964 (age 62); Tacoma, Washington, U.S.
- Education: Carnegie Mellon University (BFA)
- Occupation: Actor
- Years active: 1985–present
- Spouse(s): Desiree DaCosta (m. 1994; div. 2021) Josephine Hart (m. 2023)
- Children: 3
- Website: www.blairunderwood.com

Blair Erwin Underwood (born August 25, 1964) is an American actor. He made his debut in the 1985 musical film Krush Groove and from 1987 to 1994 starred as attorney Jonathan Rollins in the NBC legal drama series L.A. Law.

Underwood has appeared in a number of films during his career, including Just Cause (1995), Set It Off (1996), Deep Impact (1998), Rules of Engagement (2000), Something New (2006), Madea's Family Reunion (2006), Juanita (2019), and Longlegs (2024). On television, he played a leading role in the 2000 medical drama City of Angels, and also had regular roles in High Incident (1996–97), LAX (2004–05), Dirty Sexy Money (2007–09), In Treatment (2008), The Event (2010–11), Ironside (2013) and Quantico (2016–18). Underwood has received two Golden Globe Award nominations, one Tony Award nomination, five NAACP Image Awards, one Daytime Emmy Award, and one Grammy Award.

== Early life and education ==
Blair Erwin Underwood was born on August 25, 1964 in Tacoma, Washington, the son of Marilyn Ann Scales, an interior decorator, and Frank Eugene Underwood Sr., a colonel in the United States Army. Frank Sr. was an Army Ranger and paratrooper who was wounded in the Vietnam War. Underwood lived on military bases and Army posts in the United States and Stuttgart, Germany, throughout his childhood due to his father's military career.

He attended Petersburg High School in Petersburg, Virginia. He went on to attend the Carnegie Mellon School of Drama in Pittsburgh, Pennsylvania, and is an honorary member of the Phi Beta Sigma fraternity.

== Career ==
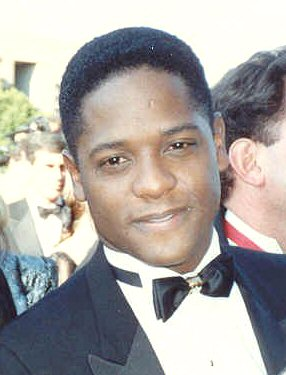
Underwood at the 41st Emmy Awards, September 1989

After his film debut, Krush Groove, Underwood's 1985 appearance on The Cosby Show landed him a short stint for three months on the ABC soap opera One Life to Live as Bobby Blue. He later co-starred in the short-lived CBS crime drama series Downtown from 1986 to 1987, and guest-starred on Scarecrow and Mrs. King and 21 Jump Street.

In 1987, Underwood, at the age of 23, was cast as attorney Jonathan Rollins in the NBC legal drama series L.A. Law. He received Golden Globe Award nomination for Best Supporting Actor – Series, Miniseries or Television Film in 1991. The series ended in 1994. In 1990, he played James Chaney in the NBC television film Murder in Mississippi. In 1993, he co-starred in the western film Posse starring Mario Van Peebles. After L.A. Law, he starred in a number of movies, In 1995, he appeared in the legal thriller Just Cause, and the following year played Jada Pinkett's love interest in the heist film Set It Off. He also had a supporting role as a geneticist in the science fiction film Gattaca (1997) and in the disaster film Deep Impact (1998). In 1996, he was featured in the July issue of erotic magazine Playgirl.

In 1996, Underwood returned to series television with ABC police drama series, High Incident. He co-starred opposite Cicely Tyson in the 1998 miniseries Mama Flora's Family. In 2000, he portrayed a Marine Captain in the film Rules of Engagement, and played the lead role in the short-lived CBS medical drama series City of Angels. Underwood was voted one of People magazine's "50 Most Beautiful People" in 2000, and one of TV Guide magazine's "Most Influential Faces of the 90s". In 2003, he guest starred in four episodes on the HBO series Sex and the City playing Cynthia Nixon's love interest. In 2004, he played the role of Roger De Souza opposite Heather Locklear in NBC short-lived drama LAX. In 2006, he appeared in the romantic comedy film Something New, and in Tyler Perry's second film, Madea's Family Reunion. He had a recurring role as the sexy grade school teacher in the CBS sitcom The New Adventures of Old Christine opposite Julia Louis-Dreyfus from 2006 to 2008. In 2007, he guest starred in an episode of the NBC series Law & Order: Special Victims Unit. In 2007, Underwood portrayed Jesus Christ in Inspired By... The Bible Experience, an 89-hour, celebrity-voiced, fully dramatized audio Bible based on Today's New International Version. Also in 2007, Underwood co-authored the novel Casanegra: A Tennyson Hardwick Novel with husband-and-wife team Steven Barnes and Tananarive Due.

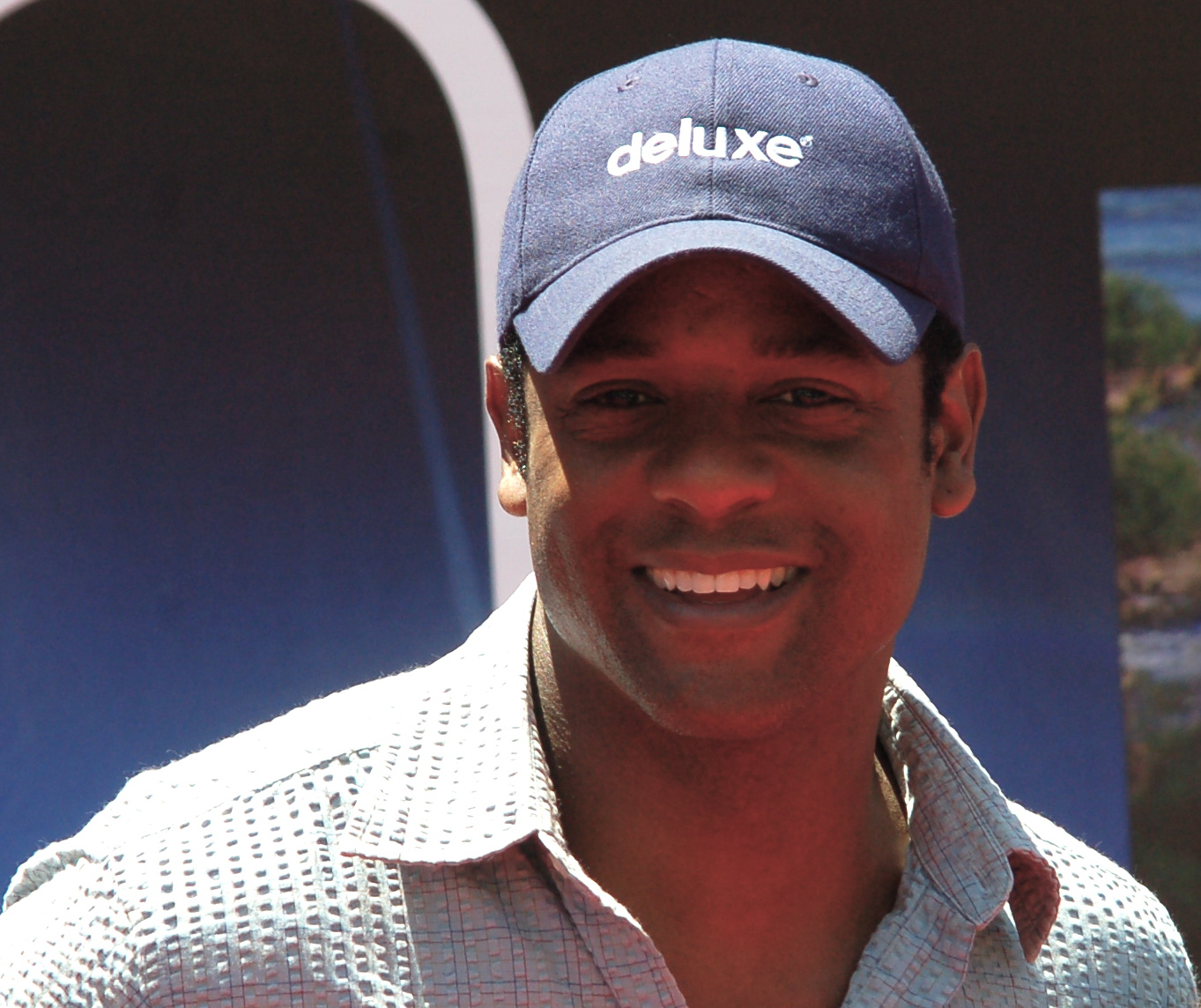
Underwood at the premiere for Earth in April 2009

In 2008, Underwood starred in the first season of the HBO drama series In Treatment, for which he was nominated for Best Supporting Actor – Series, Miniseries or Television Film at the 2009 Golden Globes. From 2007 to 2009, he was regular cast member in the ABC prime time soap opera, Dirty Sexy Money.

In 2010–2011, Underwood portrayed United States President Elias Martinez in the NBC drama series The Event. In 2010, Underwood portrayed the role of Saint Mark in The Truth & Life Dramatized Audio New Testament Bible, a 22-hour, celebrity-voiced, fully dramatized audio New Testament, based on the RSV-CE translation. In 2012, he played the lead role of Stanley in the Broadway revival of A Streetcar Named Desire.

In 2013, Underwood played the role of Robert Ironside in the remake of the successful 1960s television series, Ironside, made famous by the late Raymond Burr. The show was cancelled after three episodes. The following year, he appeared in The Trip to Bountiful opposite Cicely Tyson. From 2015 to 2016, he had a recurring role in the ABC series Agents of S.H.I.E.L.D. In 2016, Underwood was cast in the ABC thriller series Quantico for the series regular role of CIA Deputy Director, Owen Hall. The series was canceled after three seasons in 2018.

In 2019, Underwood played attorney Bobby Burns in the Netflix miniseries When They See Us. The following year, he co-starred opposite Octavia Spencer in the Netflix miniseries Self Made: Inspired by the Life of Madam C. J. Walker. Underwood has been a frequent guest narrator at Disney's Candlelight Processional, narrating the event in 2013, 2014, 2015, 2018, and 2021. He was also in the drama film Juanita (2019), and the horror film Longlegs (2024).

In January 2020, Underwood appeared on stage as Captain Richard Davenport in the Roundabout Theatre Company's Broadway revival of Charles Fuller's Pulitzer Prize–winning drama A Soldier's Play.

== Other activities ==
Underwood is a part of several charitable organizations. In 1989 he was a co-founder of Artists for a New South Africa (ANSA), along with Alfre Woodard, Danny Glover, and other actors.

He won the 1993 Humanitarian Award for his work with the Los Angeles chapter of the Muscular Dystrophy Association. In 2003, along with Ashley Judd, he served as the spokesperson for YouthAIDS. In addition, he is involved with the AIDS Healthcare Foundation's Blair Underwood Clinic in Washington, D.C..

Underwood appeared in a 2004 public service announcement for The Fulfillment Fund. He is a trustee for the Robey Theatre Company in Los Angeles, a non-profit theatre group founded by Danny Glover, focusing on plays about the Black experience.

He supported President Barack Obama's candidacy and spoke at campaign rallies for him. Underwood got to know former President Obama while researching his L.A. Law role at Harvard Law School, while the would-be President Obama was president of the Harvard Law Review.

In 2025, Underwood became part-owner of the Oakland Ballers in the Pioneer League, an independent baseball league.

== Personal life ==
Underwood married Desiree DaCosta, with whom he shares three children; they separated in 2021 after 27 years of marriage. On June 24, 2023, he married his longtime friend, Josie Hart.

== Filmography ==
=== Film ===
Year	Title	Role	Notes
1985	Krush Groove	Russell Walker	
1992	The Second Coming	Jesus	Short
1993	Posse	Sheriff Carver	
1995	Just Cause	Bobby Earl Ferguson	
1996	Set It Off	Keith Weston	
1997	Gattaca	Geneticist	
1998	Sister I'm Sorry	Himself	Short
1998	Deep Impact	Mark Simon	
1999	Asunder	Chance Williams	
1999	The Wishing Tree	"Magic Man"	
2000	Rules of Engagement	Captain Lee, USMC	
2002	Truth Be Told	Detective Harris	
2002	G	Chip Hightower	
2002	Full Frontal	Calvin / Nicholas	
2003	Malibu's Most Wanted	Tom Gibbons	
2004	Fronterz	Unknown	
2004	Do Geese See God?	Man	
2005	The Golden Blaze	Gregory Fletcher/The Golden Blaze (voice)	
2006	Something New	Mark Harper	
2006	Madea's Family Reunion	Carlos	
2006	Company Town	Tom Wilson	Short
2007	The Hit	Hen	
2009	Weather Girl	Weather Girl	
2010	From Cape Town with Love	Tennyson Hardwick	Short
2010	I Will Follow	Evan	
2011	The Art of Getting By	Principal Bill Martinson	
2012	Woman Thou Art Loosed: On the 7th Day	David Ames	
2018	The After Party	Sergeant Martin Ellison	
2019	Juanita	Himself	
2020	Bad Hair	Amos Bludso	
2020	Really Love	Jerome Richmond	
2023	Origin	Amari	
2024	Longlegs	Agent Carter	
2025	Youngblood	Blane Youngblood	
2026	One Spoon of Chocolate	Ronald Beem	
TBA	Viral	Andrew	Also director

=== Television ===
Year	Title	Role	Notes
1985	Knight Rider	Potts	Episode: "Knight of the Juggernaut: Part 1"
1985	The Cosby Show	Denise's Friend/Mark	Guest cast (season 1–2)
1985	One Life to Live	Bobby Blue	Regular cast
1986	Soul Train	Himself	Episode: "Melba Moore/Freddie Jackson/Beau Williams"
1986–1987	Downtown	Terry Corsaro	Main cast
1987	Scarecrow and Mrs. King	Stillman	Episode: "All That Glitters"
1987	21 Jump Street	Reginald Brooks	Episode: "Gotta Finish the Riff"
1987–1994	L.A. Law	Jonathan Rollins	Main cast (season 2–8)
1988	Mickey's 60th Birthday	Jonathan Rollins	TV movie
1989	The Cover Girl and the Cop	Horace Bouchet	TV movie
1990	Murder in Mississippi	James Chaney	TV movie
1990	Heat Wave	Robert Richardson	TV movie
1990	Rose Parade	Himself/Co-Host	Main co-host
1991	Showtime at the Apollo	Himself/Co-Host	Episode: "Episode #5.9"
1991	Sesame Street	Himself	Episode: "Episode #23.7"
1991	A Different World	Zelmer Collier	Episode: "War and Peace"
1991	American Experience	Lewis Douglass	Episode: "The Massachusetts 54th Colored Infantry"
1993	Father & Son: Dangerous Relations	Jared Williams	TV movie
1994	ABC Afterschool Special	Himself	Episode: "I Hate the Way I Look"
1996	Soul of the Game	Jackie Robinson	TV movie
1996	Mistrial	Lieutenant C. Hodges	TV movie
1996	Duckman	Himself (voice)	Episode: "Pig Amok"
1996–1997	High Incident	Officer Michael Rhoades	Main cast (season 2)
1997	Happily Ever After: Fairy Tales for Every Child	King Midas (voice)	Episode: "King Midas and the Golden Touch"
1998	Mama Flora's Family	Willie	Episode: "Part 1 & 2"
1999	NAACP Image Awards	Himself/Co-Host	Main co-host
2000	Linc's	Himself	Episode: "A Dry White Season"
2000	City of Angels	Dr. Ben Turner	Main cast
2001	Biography	Himself	Episode: "Kim Fields: A Little Somethin' Somethin'"
2001	Great Performances	Himself/Narrator	Episode: "Free to Dance"
2002	Inside TV Land	Himself	Episode: "Inside TV Land: African Americans in Television – Variety"
2003	The Jamie Kennedy Experiment	Himself	2 episodes
2003–2004	Sex and the City	Dr. Robert Leeds	Recurring cast (season 6)
2004	TV Land's Top Ten	Himself	Episode: "Top 10 TV Cars"
2004–2005	LAX	Roger De Souza	Main cast
2004–2005	Fatherhood	Dr. Arthur Bindlebeep (voice)	Main cast
2005	Half & Half	Himself	Episode: "The Big Pomp & Circumstance Episode"
2006–2010	The New Adventures of Old Christine	Daniel Harris	Recurring cast (season 2–3), guest (season 5)
2006	Covert One: The Hades Factor	Palmer Addison	Episode: "Part 1 & 2"
2007	Law & Order: Special Victims Unit	Miles Sennett	Episode: "Burned"
2007–2009	Dirty Sexy Money	Simon Elder	Main cast
2008	In Treatment	Alex	Recurring cast (season 1)
2010–2011	The Event	President Elias Martinez	Main cast
2011	Vietnam in HD	Charles J. Brown	Main cast
2012	Unsung	Himself	Episode: "Full Force"
2012	Who Do You Think You Are?	Himself	Episode: "Blair Underwood"
2012	Superman of Tokyo	Superman of Tokyo	Episode: "Part 1 & 2"
2012–2013	The Secret Millionaire	Himself/Narrator	Main narrator
2013	Thunder and Lightning	Black Lightning	Recurring cast (season 1)
2013	Ironside	Robert Ironside	Main cast
2014	The Trip to Bountiful	Ludie Watts	TV movie
2015	Jake and the Never Land Pirates	Captain Wraith (voice)	Recurring cast (season 4)
2016	Against the Odds	Himself/Narrator	Main narrator
2016	Unsung Hollywood	Himself	Episode: "Tim Reid"
2016	The Good Wife	Harry Dargis	Episode: "Shoot"
2016	Sofia the First	Sir Jaxon (voice)	Episode: "The Secret Library: The Tale of the Noble Knight"
2015–2016	Agents of S.H.I.E.L.D.	Andrew Garner	Recurring cast (season 2-3)
2016–2018	Quantico	Owen Hall	Main cast (season 2–3)
2016–2019	The Lion Guard	Makuu (voice)	Recurring cast (season 1–2), guest (season 3)
2016–2017	Give	Himself	Episode: "Give to Veterans Who Are Adjusting to Life After Service"; also executive producer
2019	When They See Us	Bobby Burns	Episode: "Part 2 & 4"
2019	Dear White People	Professor Moses Brown	Recurring cast (season 3)
2020	Self Made	Charles James Walker	Main cast
2020	Your Honor	Roland Carter	Episode: "Part One"
2021	Independent Lens	Himself/Narrator	Episode: "Mr. Soul!"
2021	Impeachment: American Crime Story	Vernon Jordan	Recurring cast
2021	Love Life	Leon Hines	Episode: "Suzanné Hayward & Leon Hines"
2023	Black Pop: Celebrating the Power of Black Culture	Himself	Recurring guest
2023	See It Loud: The History of Black Television	Himself	Recurring guest
2024	Elsbeth	Cliff McGrath	Episode: "Ball Girl"
2024	Three Women	Richard	
2026–present	Doc	Ben Grant	Guest role (season 2); Main role (season 3)

=== Documentary ===
Year	Title
1998	Men of Alaye: The Hottest Black Men in America
2006	Wilder: An American First
2007	Operation Homecoming
2008	Barack Obama: Who Is This Guy?
2009	President Barack Obama: The Man and His Journey
2011	First Generation
2012	It's a Hard Act to Follow
2016	Olympic Pride, American Prejudice
2018	Mr. Soul!
2020	Penguins: Life on the Edge
2022	Bear Witness
2024	Clinton: Portrait of a Presidency
2025	Guardians of the Galápagos

=== Music videos ===
Year	Artist	Song
1989	Michael Jackson	"Liberian Girl"
2007	Joe	"If I Was Your Man"

=== Video games ===
Year	Title	Role	Notes
2008	The Legend of Spyro: Dawn of the Dragon	Hunter	Voice role

== Bibliography ==
- Before I Got Here: The Wondrous Things We Hear When We Listen to the Souls of Our Children (2005; editor, with Donyell Kennedy-McCullough (photographer))
- The Tennyson Hardwick Novels:
  - Casanegra (2007; with Tananarive Due and Steven Barnes)
  - In the Night of the Heat (2008; with Tananarive Due and Steven Barnes)
  - From Cape Town with Love (2010; with Tananarive Due and Steven Barnes)
  - South by Southeast (scheduled for September 2012; with Tananarive Due and Steven Barnes)

== Awards and nominations ==
Year	Association	Category	Nominated work	Result
1991	Golden Globe Awards	Best Supporting Actor – Series, Miniseries or Television Film	L.A. Law	Nominated
1992	NAACP Image Awards	Outstanding Actor in a Television Movie, Mini-Series or Dramatic Special	Murder in Mississippi	Won
1995	NAACP Image Awards	Outstanding Actor in a Drama Series	L.A. Law	Won
1997	NAACP Image Awards	Outstanding Actor in a Television Movie, Mini-Series or Dramatic Special	Soul of the Game	Nominated
1997	NAACP Image Awards	Outstanding Supporting Actor in a Motion Picture	Set It Off	Nominated
1999	NAACP Image Awards	Outstanding Actor in a Television Movie, Mini-Series or Dramatic Special	Mama Flora's Family	Won
2001	NAACP Image Awards	Outstanding Actor in a Drama Series	City of Angels	Won
2001	NAACP Image Awards	Outstanding Supporting Actor in a Motion Picture	Rules of Engagement	Won
2004	NAACP Image Awards	Outstanding Supporting Actor in a Comedy Series	Sex and the City	Nominated
2005	NAACP Image Awards	Outstanding Supporting Actor in a Comedy Series	Sex and the City	Nominated
2007	Audie Awards	Audiobook of the Year	The Bible Experience (New Testament)	Won
2007	Audie Awards	Inspirational/Spiritual	The Bible Experience (New Testament)	Won
2008	NAACP Image Awards	Outstanding Supporting Actor in a Comedy Series	The New Adventures of Old Christine	Nominated
2008	NAACP Image Awards	Outstanding Supporting Actor in a Drama Series	Dirty Sexy Money	Nominated
2008	Audie Awards	Audiobook of the Year	The Bible Experience (Old Testament)	Nominated
2008	Audie Awards	Inspirational/Spiritual	The Bible Experience (Old Testament)	Won
2008	Audie Awards	Multi-Voiced Performance	The Bible Experience (Old Testament)	Won
2009	Golden Globe Awards	Best Supporting Actor – Series, Miniseries or Television Film	In Treatment	Nominated
2009	Grammy Awards	Best Spoken Word Album	An Inconvenient Truth	Won
2009	NAACP Image Awards	Outstanding Actor in a Drama Series	In Treatment	Nominated
2009	NAACP Image Awards	Outstanding Supporting Actor in a Comedy Series	The New Adventures of Old Christine	Nominated
2009	NAACP Image Awards	Outstanding Supporting Actor in a Drama Series	Dirty Sexy Money	Nominated
2010	Audie Awards	Audiobook of the Year	Nelson Mandela's Favorite African Folktales	Won
2010	Audie Awards	Multi-Voiced Performance	Nelson Mandela's Favorite African Folktales	Won
2011	NAACP Image Awards	Outstanding Actor in a Drama Series	The Event	Nominated
2014	Critics' Choice Television Awards	Best Supporting Actor in a Movie/Miniseries	The Trip to Bountiful	Nominated
2015	NAACP Image Awards	Outstanding Actor in a Television Movie, Mini-Series or Dramatic Special	The Trip to Bountiful	Won
2017	Daytime Emmy Awards	Outstanding Children's or Family Viewing Series	Give	Won
2020	Tony Awards	Best Leading Actor in a Play	A Soldier's Play	Nominated

== See also ==
- African-American Tony nominees and winners
