= Tim Arango =

American journalist

Tim Arango is an American journalist and currently a national correspondent with The New York Times based in Los Angeles. He was previously the Baghdad bureau chief of The New York Times.

== Education ==
Arango obtained his master's degree in American studies from Brown University.

== Career ==
He has previously reported for the Times about media and business, and was featured in the film Page One: Inside the New York Times. Tim Arango has reported for Fortune Magazine and The New York Post. He joined The New York Times in 2007. In 2009, Arango left his job at the Times to cover the war, violence, and tragedies occurring day to day in Baghdad. Upon taking up this new position, Arango had very little experience reporting abroad. His only previous foreign experience was reporting to an English newspaper in Budapest for a year. After a year, he ended up moving back to the US to pursue his master's degree. He then worked for TheStreet.com where he covered Wall Street.
