= Page One: Inside the New York Times =

2011 film by Andrew Rossi

- Theatrical release poster
- Directed by: Andrew Rossi
- Written by: Kate Novack; Andrew Rossi
- Produced by: Josh Braun; David Hand; Kate Novack; Alan Oxman; Adam Schlesinger
- Starring: David Carr; Bruce Headlam; Richard Perez-Pena; Tim Arango; Bill Keller; Brian Stelter
- Cinematography: Andrew Rossi
- Edited by: Chad Beck; Christopher Branca; Sarah Devorkin
- Music by: Paul Brill
- Production company: Participant Media
- Distributed by: Magnolia Pictures
- Release dates: January 23, 2011 (Sundance); June 17, 2011 (United States)
- Running time: 96 minutes
- Country: United States
- Language: English
- Box office: $1.1 million

Page One: Inside the New York Times is an American documentary film by Andrew Rossi, which premiered at the 2011 Sundance Film Festival. Magnolia Pictures and Participant Media jointly acquired the U.S. distribution rights and released the film theatrically in Summer 2011. The film grossed over one million dollars at the US box office and was nominated for two News & Documentary Emmy Awards as well as a Critics' Choice Award for Best Documentary Feature.

== Synopsis ==
From the Sundance Program Description:

With the Internet surpassing print as our main news source, and newspapers going bankrupt, ... Page One chronicles the media industry's transformation and assesses the high stakes for democracy ... The film deftly makes a beeline for the eye of the storm or, depending on how you look at it, the inner sanctum of the media, gaining unprecedented access to The New York Times newsroom for a year. At the media desk, a dialectical play-within-a-play transpires as writers like salty David Carr track print journalism's metamorphosis even as their own paper struggles to stay vital and solvent, publishing material from WikiLeaks and encouraging writers to connect more directly with their audience. Meanwhile, rigorous journalism—including vibrant cross-cubicle debate and collaboration, tenacious jockeying for on-record quotes, and skillful page-one pitching—is alive and well. The resources, intellectual capital, stamina, and self-awareness mobilized when it counts attest there are no shortcuts when analyzing and reporting complex truths.

=== Stories and issues ===
- Publication of Afghan war logs by WikiLeaks
- Release of the iPad
- Bankruptcy of the Tribune Company
- NBC Universal merger with Comcast
- The Jayson Blair scandal
- Judith Miller
- Gawker and its "Big Board"
- ProPublica and new models for investigative reporting
- Charging for news online
- Watergate and the Pentagon Papers
- Staff cuts in Network News and coverage of the White House
- The purported end of U.S. combat operations in Iraq
- CNN's partnership with Vice

== Cast ==
New York Times Media Desk

- David Carr: Media columnist
- Bruce Headlam: Media editor
- Richard Pérez-Peña: Media reporter
- Tim Arango: Former media reporter, Baghdad bureau chief
- Brian Stelter: Media reporter

New York Times Business Desk

- Andrew Ross Sorkin: Financial columnist
- Larry Ingrassia: Business editor

New York Times Foreign Desk

- Susan Chira: Foreign editor
- Ian Fisher: Deputy foreign editor
- Joseph Kahn: Deputy foreign editor

New York Times Masthead

- Bill Keller: Executive editor
- Jill Abramson: Managing editor
- Dean Baquet: Assistant managing editor/Washington bureau chief

Featured interviews

- Sarah Ellison
- Clay Shirky
- Carl Bernstein
- David Remnick
- Nick Denton
- Jeff Jarvis
- Gay Talese
- Alex Jones
- Katrina vanden Heuvel
- Jimmy Wales
- Nicholas Lemann
- Seth Mnookin
- Michael Hirschorn
- James McQuivey

Others featured

- Julian Assange (In phone interview with Brian Stelter)
- Brian Lam
- Markos Moulitsas
- Noam Cohen: Special columnist

== Critical reception ==
The film received positive reviews from critics, with an approval rating of 80% at Rotten Tomatoes and an average score of 68 at Metacritic. It also received an A from indieWire.

Katey Rich of Cinema Blend wrote, "Even 30 years from now ... Page One will remain a vital and fascinating portrait of the news and the people who make it." Entertainment Weekly described the film as an "unexpected gotta-see doc," while Vanity Fair called it "slick, fun, and surprisingly sexy." Somewhat less positively, Justin Chang of Variety said of the film, "Rossi's coverage of daily news meetings and interviews with editorial staffers aren't as juicy as one might have hoped or expected, but for journos (who will likely rep the film's most appreciative audience), simply being a fly on these hallowed walls will offer much to savor," but Eric Kohn of Indiewire counters, "Rossi captures the minutiae of the newsroom, from the rapid transcription of interviews to the rush of deadlines, as if observing an Olympic sport."

Regarding David Carr, Tim Wu of Slate describes him as "a sympathetic hero for what turns out to be a riveting film," and David Fear of Time Out Chicago adds, "it's his H.L. Mencken–like attitude toward old-school reporting that offers the best example for why traditional news-gathering won't ever truly die." Sebastian Doggart of the UK's The Daily Telegraph describes Carr as the "Keith Richards of the Fourth Estate", and adds that the film is "enthralling" and "inspiring."

A notable departure from the positive reception was Michael Kinsley's review in The Times itself. He noted: "Having seen Page One, I don't know much more than I did before. The movie, directed by Andrew Rossi, is, in a word, a mess."

=== Awards ===
The film was nominated for a 2011 Critics' Choice Award.

- Denver Film Critics Society – Best Documentary
- Phoenix Film Critics Society – Best Documentary
- Oklahoma Film Critics Circle – Best Documentary
- San Diego Film Critics Society – Best Documentary nomination
- Dallas-Fort Worth Film Critics Association – Best Documentary nomination
- Broadcast Film Critics Association – Best Documentary nomination
- News & Documentary Emmy Awards – Outstanding Informational Programming – Long Form nomination, Outstanding Individual Achievement in a Craft: Editing – Documentary and Long Form nomination
