= David Carr (journalist) =

American columnist, and author (1956–2015)

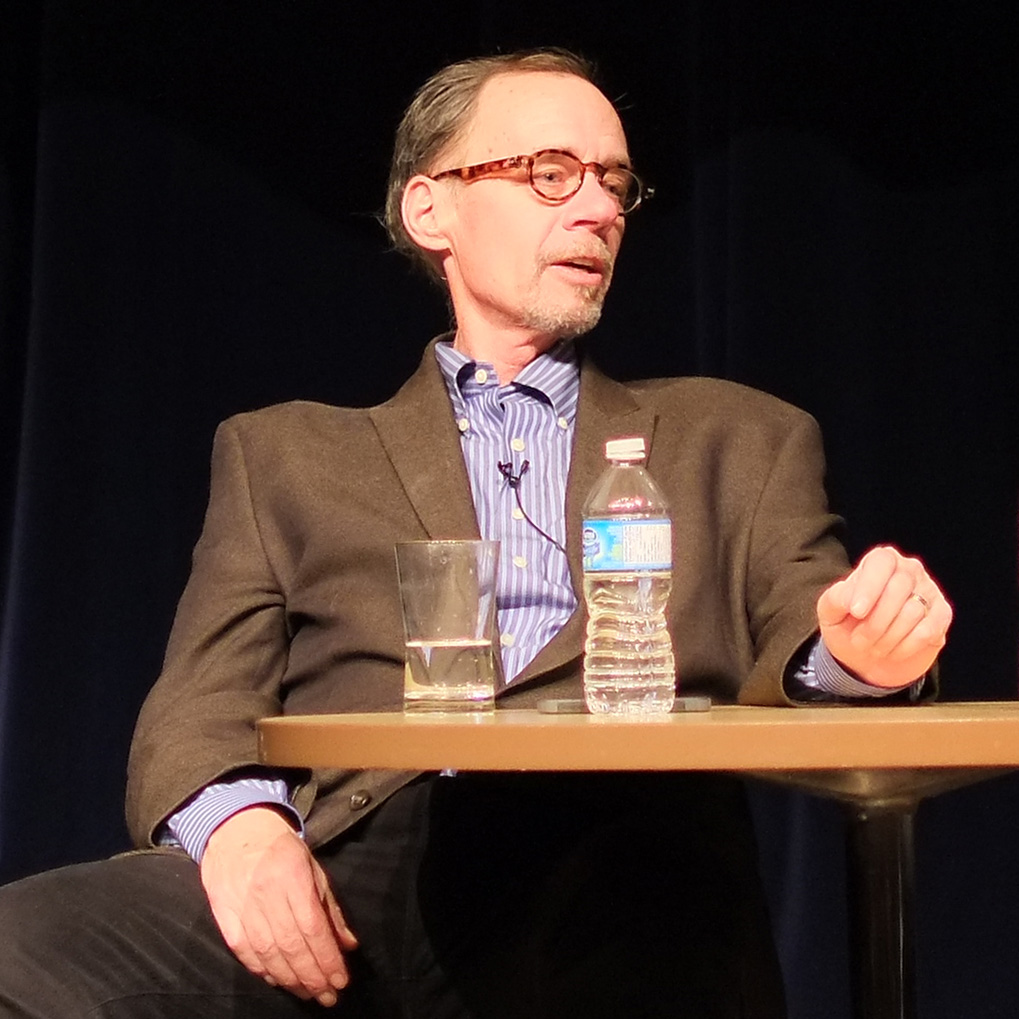
- Carr at the 2013 PuSh International Performing Arts Festival at Capilano University in North Vancouver, British Columbia, February 2013
- Born: David Michael Carr; September 8, 1956; Minneapolis, Minnesota, U.S.
- Died: February 12, 2015 (aged 58); New York City, U.S.
- Education: University of Wisconsin–River Falls; University of Minnesota
- Occupations: Writer; editor
- Years active: 1980s–2015
- Employer: The New York Times
- Spouses: Kimberly J. Carr (divorced 1986); Jill Rooney (m. 1994)
- Children: 3, including Erin Lee Carr

David Michael Carr (September 8, 1956 – February 12, 2015) was an American columnist, author, and newspaper editor. He wrote a column, Media Equation and covered culture for The New York Times.

Dean Baquet of the New York Times described him as "the finest media reporter of his generation, a remarkable and funny man who was one of the leaders of our newsroom."

== Early life ==
David Michael Carr was born on September 8, 1956, in Minneapolis, to Joan Laura Carr (née O'Neill), a local community leader, and John Lawrence Carr. David had three brothers and three sisters and grew up in Minnetonka, a suburb. He attended the University of Wisconsin–River Falls and the University of Minnesota; he graduated from the latter with a degree in psychology and journalism.

== Career ==
Carr joined The New York Times in 2002, where he was a cultural reporter and wrote The New York Times Carpetbagger blog. He remained at The New York Times until his death. In his 2008 memoir, The Night of the Gun, he detailed his experiences with cocaine addiction and included interviews with people from his past, tackling the telling of his experiences as if he were reporting about himself. The memoir was excerpted in The New York Times Magazine.

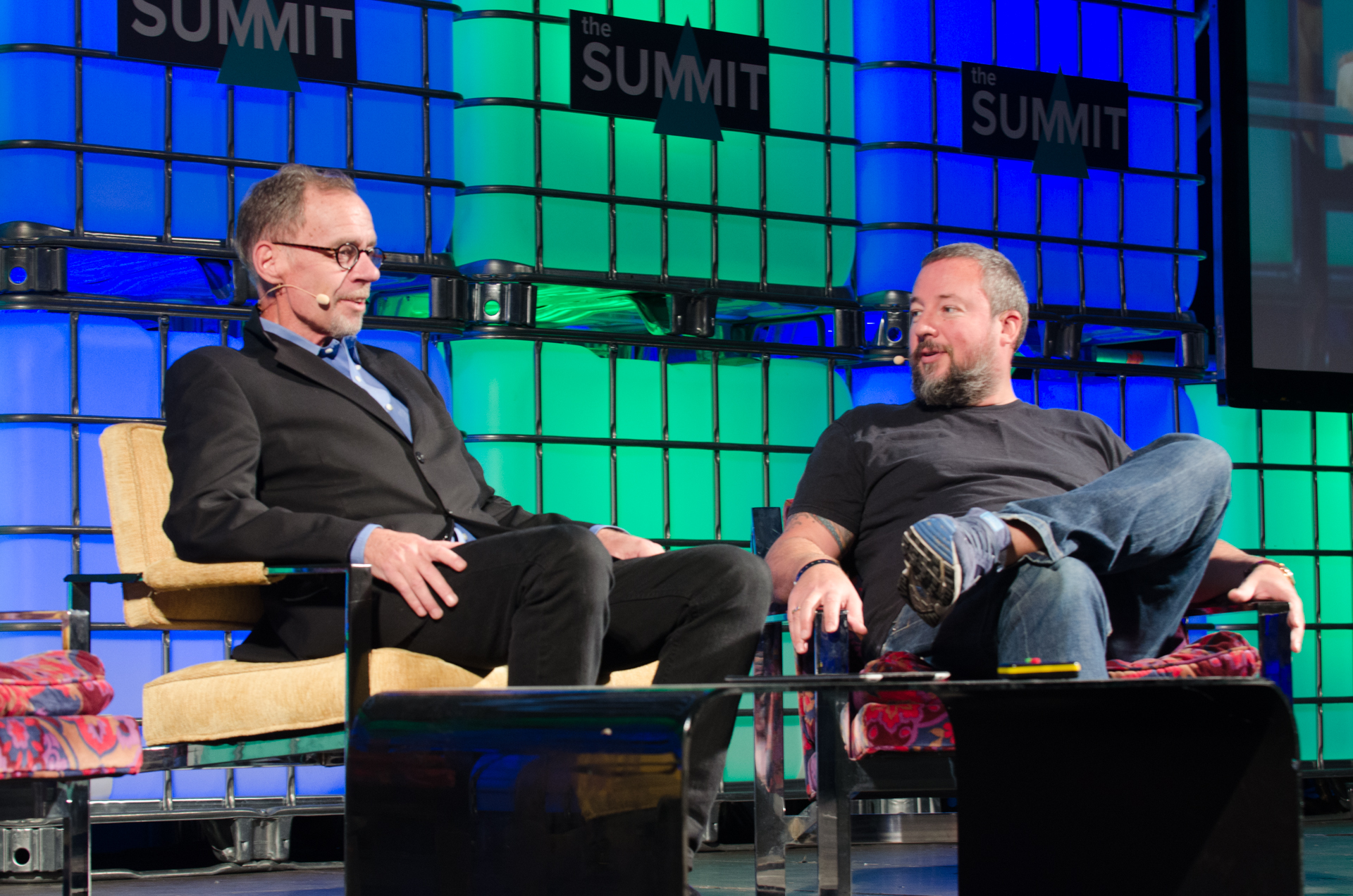
Carr in conversation with Vice co-founder Shane Smith at the Web Summit in Dublin, Ireland, October 2013

In addition, Carr wrote extensively about the media for The Atlantic Monthly and New York, as well as for the short-lived media news website Inside.com.

Earlier in his career, Carr worked for the Twin Cities Reader and the Washington City Paper.

Carr was featured prominently in the 2011 documentary Page One: Inside the New York Times, where he was shown interviewing staff from Vice, whom Carr called out for their lack of journalistic knowledge. The article about Vice was noteworthy for its clear depiction of the conflict between new online journalism and traditional journalism.

In 2014, he was named the Lack Professor of Media Studies at Boston University, a part-time position where he taught a journalism class called Press Play: Making and distributing content in the present future.

== Personal life ==
Carr and his first wife, Kimberly, divorced in 1986. In 1988, he had twin daughters, Erin and Meagan, with his partner Anna Lee, but the couple would lose custody of them, leaving them in foster care until Carr's completing drug rehabilitation allowed him to regain custody; Erin would go on to direct documentary films.. He married his second wife, Jill L. Rooney, in 1994; they had a daughter, Maddie. As of 2011, Carr lived in Montclair, New Jersey with his wife and three daughters.

In interview with Terry Gross on Fresh Air, Carr described himself as a church-going Catholic.

In 2011, Carr described himself as having previously battled Hodgkin's lymphoma, and reported developing his hoarse speaking voice during his coverage of the aftermath of the September 11 attacks. At around 9 p.m. EST on February 12, 2015, Carr collapsed in the newsroom of The New York Times and was pronounced dead at Mount Sinai Roosevelt Hospital; he was 58 years of age. The cause of death was lung cancer, with heart disease listed as a contributing factor.

== Legacy ==
In September 2015, The New York Times announced a fellowship in his name which would be dedicated to fostering the growth and development of journalists. The first three fellowship recipients, chosen by a panel of Times editors from among more than 600 applicants, were John Herrman, a co-editor and media reporter for The Awl; Amanda Hess, a staff writer at Slate; and Greg Howard, a reporter for Deadspin.

In 2016, SXSW began issuing the David Carr Prize for Emerging Writers. The first winner of the essay contest was author Jaime Boust.

Carr was a mentor to the writer Ta-Nehisi Coates, who said in 2019: "I couldn't imagine myself as a writer if I had not met David Carr. David Carr was the first person who ever believed in me." Carr was credited for launching Lena Dunham's career and was described by Gawker's John Koblin as the "Daddy" of TV series Girls. A character in the TV series The Girls on the Bus is partially based on Carr.

== Published works ==
- The Night of the Gun: A Reporter Investigates the Darkest Story of His Life, His Own. New York: Simon & Schuster, 2008. ISBN 978-1-416-54152-3.

== Appearances ==
- 2008: Book Discussion on The Night of the Gun, Olssen's Books & Records, Washington, D.C., "Book TV," C-SPAN 2. September 17, 2008.
- 2011: Page One: Inside the New York Times documentary film
- 2013: IAmA columnist and reporter on media and culture for the New York Times Reddit interview
- 2014: Commencement Address to the UC Berkeley, Graduate School of Journalism Class of 2014
