= Richard Pérez-Peña =

Cuban-American journalist (born 1963)

- Born: May 26, 1963 (age 63); Santiago de Cuba, Cuba
- Education: Pomona College
- Occupations: Journalist, writer
- Employer: The New York Times

Richard Pérez-Peña (born May 26, 1963 in Santiago, Cuba) is a Cuban-American journalist who has been with The New York Times since 1992. He has covered topics relating to Albany, New Jersey, healthcare, the media, and higher education. He currently covers breaking news. He was featured in the film Page One: Inside the New York Times.

== Criticism ==
A 2012 news story by Pérez-Peña on Yale University quarterback, Patrick Witt, was criticized by Witt and some journalists for unfairness and poor sourcing. While Pérez-Peña defended the accuracy of the story, the Public Editor of the Times raised concerns about the article, particularly its reporting a sexual assault claim based on anonymous sourcing.

== Personal and early life ==
Pérez-Peña was born in Santiago, Cuba and raised in Southern California. He studied European History at Pomona College. In 1987, Pérez-Peña appeared on the TV quiz show Jeopardy! and became a 5-time champion, later appearing in the show's first reunion invitational, Super Jeopardy!, in 1990. In 2005, he was asked to participate in the show's Ultimate Tournament of Champions but ended up not appearing in the tournament.
