= Shield of Sparrows =

2025 novel by Devney Perry

- First edition hardcover
- Author: Devney Perry
- Cover artist: LJ Anderson
- Language: English
- Genre: Romantic fantasy
- Publisher: Entangled Publishing
- Publication date: May 6, 2025
- Publication place: United States
- Pages: 400
- ISBN: 9781649378088
- Followed by: Rites of the Starling

Shield of Sparrows is a romantic fantasy novel by American author Devney Perry. It was published on May 6, 2025 by Entangled Publishing. A film adaptation is set to be produced by Amazon MGM Studios. It is Perry's first fantasy novel, having previously written contemporary romance. An audiobook narrated by Samantha Brentmoor and Jason Clarke was released concurrently with the ebook and hardcover editions.

== Summary ==
Odessa is the princess of Quentis, overshadowed by her half-sister Mae. She is forced into marriage with Prince Zavier of Turah by her father in order to secure trade routes and military alliances with the kingdom. Her father uses this to infiltrate Turah, find its capital city, and stop the kingdom's monsters from migrating into Quentis. As she embarks on her journey to meet the prince, she develops complex feelings for his bodyguard known as the Guardian, and finds herself torn between her attraction to him and her duties to her kingdom and her father, while also trying to save the world from monsters.

== Reception ==
The novel debuted in the number one position of the New York Times Hardcover Fiction Best Seller List and the USA Today Best-selling Booklist. It was nominated for an Audie Award for Audiobook of the Year and a Goodreads Choice Award for Romantasy.

Kirkus Reviews called the worldbuilding "lush", the pacing "relentless", and Odessa's internal conflict "compelling", but said that Mae's motivations, ambitions and political maneuverings might have benefitted from deeper exploration. Autumn West of Library Journal called the novel "immersive" and "intricate".

== Sequel ==
A sequel titled Rites of the Starling released on April 7, 2026. It follows Odessa as she must escape from a priest who has kidnapped her and return to the Guardian, all the while protecting a young girl.

== Film adaptation ==
A film adaptation was announced on May 2, 2025, four days before the novel's release. It is set to be written by Derek Kolstad and produced by Amazon MGM Studios. The film will be produced by Liz Pelletier and Sherryl Clark under their newly launched Premeditated banner. Devney Perry will executive produce the film alongside Kolstad.
