= The Bible Experience =

2007 audible book

- Audio read by: Blair Underwood; Samuel L. Jackson; Angela Bassett; Cuba Gooding Jr. Denzel Washington; Paul Adefarasin; LL Cool J Eartha Kitt
- Language: English
- Genre: Audio Bible
- Publisher: Zondervan
- Publication date: 2007
- Publication place: United States

Inspired by...The Bible Experience is an audio version of the Bible published by Zondervan. The script used is the Today's New International Version (TNIV) Bible translation. The re-enactment was performed by a cast of more than 200 African-American actors, singers, musicians, poets, personalities, and clergy, including 3 Oscar winners, 5 Golden Globe winners, 7 Emmy winners, and 23 Grammy winners. Members of this cast include Blair Underwood as Jesus, Samuel L. Jackson and Paul Adefarasin as God, Kirk Franklin as Simon Peter, Angela Bassett, Dulé Hill, Cuba Gooding, Jr., Denzel Washington and Pauletta Washington in the Song of Songs, LL Cool J as Samson, Eartha Kitt as the Serpent, Bishop T.D. Jakes as Abraham, and Bishop Eddie L. Long as Joel. The original music score was composed by Grammy award-winning producers and performed by the Prague Philharmonic Orchestra.

- Inspired by...The Bible Experience: New Testament received the 2007 Audie Award for Audiobook of the Year by the Audio Publishers Association.
- Inspired by...The Bible Experience: The Complete Bible was released in November 2007 and includes the Old and New Testament. The run-time of The Bible Experience: The Complete Bible is 89 hours on 79 CD's. An MP3 8 CD version is also available.

== See also ==
- Audio Bible

== External list ==
- Official website
