= Wake: The Hidden History of Women-Led Slave Revolts =

2022 graphic novel written by Rebecca Hall

- First edition
- Date: June 21, 2022
- Page count: 224 pages
- Publisher: Simon & Schuster

Creative team
- Writer: Rebecca Hall
- Artist: Hugo Martínez

Original publication
- Language: English
- ISBN: 9781982115203

Wake: The Hidden History of Women-Led Slave Revolts is a graphic novel written by Rebecca Hall and illustrated by Hugo Martínez. Wake was published by Simon & Schuster on June 21, 2022.

== Synopsis ==
The book follows Rebecca Hall's experiences searching through municipal records and archives in an attempt to find evidence of the Atlantic slave trade and its effects on American society. Hall includes autobiographical details about herself and her ancestors in relation to her search.

== Background ==
Tasha Lowe-Newsome suggests in The Comics Journal that the title's use of the word "wake" has multiple meanings. For instance, wake up to historical realities, wake up to current day reality, the wake of a slave ship, and the wake or remembrance of the African people who lost their lives. The graphic novel was written by Rebecca Hall and illustrated by Hugo Martínez.

== Reception ==
The graphic novel received a starred review from Publishers Weekly calling it a "nuanced and affecting debut". Kirkus Reviews called the book "An urgent, brilliant work of historical excavation." Annie Bostrom wrote in Booklist that the novel is "A necessary corrective to violent erasure and a tribute to untold strength". Jaime Herndon wrote in Book Riot that it is "a powerful book that shines a light on an often-ignored part of history." Michael Cavna and David Betancourt of The Washington Post, included the book in their list of the best graphic novels of 2021 saying that the book is "a must-read achievement." The book was a 2022 Finalist in the PEN America Literary Award in the category PEN Open Book Award. The book was nominated for the Publishers Weekly 2021 Graphic Novel Critics Poll. The novel was also nominated in the category Outstanding Literary Work by a Debut Author in the 53rd NAACP Image Awards.
