= Bruce Headlam =

Canadian journalist

Bruce Headlam is a Canadian journalist and the media desk editor of The New York Times since September 2008. He has reported in the several sections of the newspaper since 1998, including Circuits, Escapes and the Times Magazine. Previously he had worked at Saturday Night Magazine and Canadian Business. He was featured in the film Page One: Inside the New York Times.

He was born in Elmira, Ontario. As of 2011, he was engaged to Stephanie Clifford, whom he hired as a reporter in 2008.
