= Audio Bible =

Recorded dictation of biblical texts

Audio Bibles or spoken Bibles are Bibles that were recorded in audio format. They provide the listener the ability to listen to the Scriptures without being required to look directly at written text.

== History ==
The first audio Bible (KJV in English language) was recorded and narrated by Alexander Scourby in the 1950s for the American Foundation of the Blind. It was first recorded on long play records, then 8-track player, and then cassette tape. The Bible in cassette tape was 72-hours long, and it took 72 cassette tapes to record the entire audio Bible.

From then on other audio Bibles were recorded on CDs, DVDs and other media devices.

David Suchet recorded and narrated the entire Bible (NIV) and James Earl Jones recorded and narrated the New Testament (KJV). Likewise, Johnny Cash recorded and narrated the King James New Testament. Laurence Olivier also recited portions of the King James Bible.

== See also ==
- Faith Comes By Hearing
- The Bible Experience
