= Mandalay Television =

US television production company

- Type: Subsidiary
- Industry: Television production
- Founded: 1994; 32 years ago
- Founder: Peter Guber
- Headquarters: Los Angeles, California, United States
- Parent: Mandalay Entertainment (1994–1997, 1999–present); Lions Gate Television (1997–1999)
- Website: www.mandalay.com

Mandalay Television is a television production company, founded in 1994, which is part of producer and businessman Peter Guber's Mandalay Entertainment. From 1997 to 1999, Lions Gate Entertainment owned the company before selling it.

== History ==
The television unit was founded at the same time as the parent studio Mandalay Entertainment. It originally had an exclusive deal with Sony Pictures Entertainment, who was producing shows and television films under the logos of Columbia Pictures Television and TriStar Television.

In 1997, Mandalay Entertainment was sold to Lions Gate Entertainment. Two years later, Mandalay Television was split off from Lions Gate, and it became an independent organization again. In 1999, Mandalay Television's deal with Columbia TriStar Television was extended.

In 2000, Elizabeth Stephen, former executive vice president at The Avnet/Kerner Co., joined the company as the head of its television movie division. In 2004, the company merged with Mosaic Media Group's television division to form Mandalay Mosaic Television Group.

== Television productions ==
=== Television shows ===
==== 1990s ====
Start date	End date	Title	Network	Notes	Seasons	Episodes
1 August 1998	15 February 2001	Rude Awakening	Showtime	co-production with Lions Gate Television (seasons 2–3), Columbia TriStar Television Distribution and Showtime Networks	3	55
26 August 1998	4 March 2000	Oh Baby	Lifetime	co-production with Lions Gate Television (season 2) and Columbia TriStar Television	2	44
26 September 1998	11 February 1999	Cupid	ABC	co-production with Columbia TriStar Television	1	15
6 October 1998	15 July 1999	Mercy Point	UPN	co-production with Columbia TriStar Television	1	7

==== 2000s ====
Start date	End date	Title	Network	Notes	Seasons	Episodes
4 April 2000	12 April 2000	Falcone	CBS	co-production with Johnson/Hancock Productions, Lions Gate Television, December 3rd Productions, CBS Productions and Columbia TriStar Television	1	9
12 July 2000	30 August 2000	Young Americans	The WB	co-production with Lions Gate Television and Columbia TriStar Television	1	13
2001	2002	Go for It! TV	USA Network (2001); ABC Family (2002)	under Mandalay Sports Action Entertainment; co-production with Scott Sternberg Productions and No Studio Entertainment, Inc; distributed by Litton Entertainment	approx. 2	approx. 65
5 November 2005	2006	Jason Roberts' Taste	Independent Television	under Mandalay Sports Action Entertainment	1	approx. 65
5 June 2006	2007	Discovery Health Moments	Discovery Health	under Mandalay Sports Action Entertainment; distribution only; produced by HighRoad Productions	1	approx. 13
9 July 2006	21 December 2008	Brotherhood	Showtime	co-production with Gangtackle Productions and Showtime Networks	3	29

==== 2020s ====
Start date	End date	Title	Network	Notes	Seasons	Episodes
15 October 2021	12 November 2021	I Know What You Did Last Summer	Amazon Prime Video	co-production with Off Center, Inc., Atomic Monster, Original Film, Amazon Studios, and Sony Pictures Television Studios	1	8

=== Television movies ===
==== 1990s ====
Release date	Title	Network	Notes
5 August 1997	Intensity	Fox	co-production with TriStar Television
28 September 1997	Get to the Heart: The Barbara Mandrell Story	CBS	co-production with Hallmark Entertainment
12 October 1997	Final Descent	CBS	co-production with Columbia TriStar Television
16 November 1997	Medusa's Child	ABC	co-production with Comsky Group and Columbia TriStar Television
8 February 1998	Bad As I Wanna Be: The Dennis Rodman Story	ABC	co-production with Columbia TriStar Television
15 August 1999	First Daughter	TBS	co-production with Columbia TriStar Television and Lions Gate Television
10 October 1999	Final Run	CBS	co-production with Tandem Communications, KirchMedia, Lions Gate Television and Columbia TriStar Television

==== 2000s ====
Release date	Title	Network	Notes
10 January 2000	King of the World	ABC	under Mandalay Sports Entertainment; co-production with Lions Gate Television, Samoset Productions, Stephanie Germain Productions and Endemol Entertainment
11 February 2000	Shutterspeed	TNT	under Mandalay Sports Action Entertainment; co-production with Lions Gate Television, Columbia TriStar Television and Shutterspeed Productions
21 May 2000	The Linda McCartney Story	CBS	co-production with Metafilmics, Lions Gate Television and Columbia TriStar Television
13 September 2000	Sole Survivor	Fox	co-production with Lions Gate Television and Columbia TriStar Television
15 October 2000	First Target	TBS	co-production with KirchMedia, Lions Gate Television and Columbia TriStar Television
14 April 2002	The Pilot's Wife	CBS	co-production with Stephanie Germain Productions, imX Communications and Lions Gate Television
20 April 2002	Superfire	ABC	co-production with Epsilon TV Production, KirchMedia, Stephanie Germain Productions, Tandem Communications and Lions Gate Television
11 August 2002	First Shot	TBS	co-production with Lions Gate Television and Columbia TriStar Television
13 September 2002	Blood Crime	USA Network	co-production with Columbia TriStar Domestic Television
February 2003	The Extreme Team	N/A	co-production with Warren Miller Films and Touchstone Television
2003	MIA: Solved	History Channel	as Mandalay Sports Action Entertainment
9 April 2005	White Space	NBC	under Mandalay Sports Action Entertainment; co-production with Burton Films and Konwiser Brothers
29 January 2007	Angels Fall	Lifetime	co-production with Degeto Film, Alberta Film Entertainment, Stephanie Germain Productions and Tandem Filmproduktion
5 February 2007	Montana Sky	Lifetime	co-production with Stephanie Germain Productions
12 February 2007	Blue Smoke	Lifetime	co-production with Stephanie Germain Productions
19 February 2007	Carolina Moon	Lifetime	co-production with Alberta Film Entertainment, ARD Degeto Film, Stephanie Germain Productions and Tandem Communications
2008	R.P.M.	TNT	unsold pilot
21 March 2009	Northern Lights	Lifetime	co-production with Alberta Film Entertainment and Stephanie Germain Productions
28 March 2009	Midnight Bayou	Lifetime	co-production with Stephanie Germain Productions
4 April 2009	High Noon	Lifetime	co-production with Alberta Film Entertainment, Tandem Communications and Stephanie Germain Productions
11 April 2009	Tribute	Lifetime	co-production with Stephanie Germain Productions

==== 2010s ====
Release date	Title	Network	Notes
13 June 2011	Carnal Innocence	Lifetime	co-production with Silver Screen Pictures and Stephanie Germain Productions
