= Stephanie Germain =

American television and film producer

- Born: New York City, NY, U.S.
- Education: Duke University
- Occupations: Television Producer, Film Producer
- Years active: 1995–present
- Website: www.germainfilms.com

Stephanie Germain is an American television and film producer. Notable credits include The Day After Tomorrow, The Nora Roberts Film Collection, The Murder, She Baked Film Series, and Ike: Countdown to D-Day, for which she was nominated for the Primetime Emmy Award for Outstanding Television Movie

== Background ==
After beginning her career at ABC News, she moved to Los Angeles to work as a development executive for Von Zerneck/Sertner Films and Oliver Stone. She then had producing deals at Mandalay Pictures Television and Sony Pictures Television prior to forming her own independent company.

== Credits ==
- Murder She Baked: Just Desserts (TV Movie 2017, Executive Producer)
- Murder She Baked: A Deadly Recipe (TV Movie 2016, Executive Producer)
- Murder She Baked: A Peach Cobbler Mystery (TV Movie 2016, Executive Producer)
- Murder She Baked: A Plum Pudding Mystery (TV Movie 2015, Executive Producer)
- Murder She Baked, Just Desserts (TV Movie 2015, Executive Producer)
- Hide (TV Movie 2011, Executive Producer)
- Carnal Innocence (TV Movie 2011, Executive Producer)
- Tribute (TV Movie 2009, Executive Producer)
- High Noon (TV Movie 2009, Executive Producer)
- Midnight Bayou (TV Movie 2009, Executive Producer)
- Northern Lights (TV Movie 2009, Executive Producer)
- Carolina Moon (TV Movie 2007, Executive Producer)
- Blue Smoke (TV Movie 2007, Executive Producer)
- Angels Fall (film) (TV Movie 2007, Executive Producer)
- Montana Sky (TV Movie 2007, Executive Producer)
- A Perfect Day (TV Movie 2006, Executive Producer)
- Ike: Countdown to D-Day (TV Movie 2004, Executive Producer)
- The Day After Tomorrow (Feature 2004, Executive Producer)
- Gracie’s Choice (TV Movie 2004, Executive Producer)
- Jeremiah (TV Series 2002–2004, Executive Producer)
- Superfire (TV Movie 2002, Executive Producer)
- The Pilot’s Wife (TV Movie 2011, Executive Producer)
- The Princess and the Marine (TV Movie 2001, Executive Producer)
- King of the World (TV Movie 2000, Executive Producer)
- Fatal Error (TV Movie 1999, Co-Executive Producer)
- Too Rich: The Secret Life of Doris Duke (TV Movie 1999, Producer)
- Virtual Obsession (TV Movie 1998, Producer)
- Holiday in Your Heart (TV Movie 1997, Producer)
- Mother Knows Best (TV Movie 2011, Co-Producer)
- No One Would Tell (TV Movie 1996, Co-Producer)
