= Mandalay Entertainment =

American entertainment company

Mandalay Entertainment Group
- Type: Private
- Industry: Entertainment
- Founded: 1994; 32 years ago
- Founder: Peter Guber
- Headquarters: Los Angeles, California, United States
- Key people: Peter Guber (CEO)
- Products: Motion pictures; Television programs; Baseball teams
- Parent: Lions Gate Entertainment (1998–2002)
- Divisions: Mandalay Pictures; Mandalay Television; Mandalay Sports Media
- Website: www.mandalay.com

Mandalay Entertainment Group is an American entertainment company founded in 1994 by Peter Guber, after he left Sony Pictures, with interests in motion pictures, animated films, television, sports entertainment and new media.

Mandalay principal Gruber is co-executive chairman of aXiomatic, which partnered with Ted Leonsis, the majority owner of Washington Wizards, to acquire esports franchise Team Liquid, in 2016. In 2017, Gruber stated to CNBC, that the future of sports is in esports, an opinion he continued to espouse in 2020. Gruber's affiliated Mandalay Bay Resort in Las Vegas hosts various esports tournaments.

== Divisions ==
- Mandalay Pictures is a film production company whose productions include I Know What You Did Last Summer, Donnie Brasco, Seven Years in Tibet, Wild Things, Les Misérables, The Deep End of the Ocean, Sleepy Hollow, The Score, Io and Into the Blue.
- Mandalay Television is a producer of television series, including Cupid, Mercy Point, Rude Awakening, and Brotherhood. It also previously distributed games of its minor league baseball teams owned by Mandalay Baseball Properties for television airings. It also produces television films and miniseries. Its productions include Intensity, Get to the Heart: The Barbara Mandrell Story, Bad As I Wanna Be: The Dennis Rodman Story, Sole Survivor, First Daughter, The Linda McCartney Story, Angels Fall, Blue Smoke, Carolina Moon, Montana Sky, Northern Lights, Midnight Bayou, High Noon and Tribute.
- Mandalay Sports Media is a producer of scripted sports films, unscripted sports films, sports documentaries, and sports entertainment in general. MSM previously included Mandalay Baseball Properties (MBP), responsible for several professional baseball franchises, sports marketing, stadium development, ownership, management and consulting.

== Former divisions ==
- Dick Clark Productions, which has been co-owned by Mandalay twice, from 2004 to 2007, and again, from September 2012 until October 2016.
- Mandalay Baseball LLC, responsible for several professional baseball franchises, sports marketing, stadium development, ownership, management and consulting
