= Carolina Moon =

Carolina Moon may refer to:

- "Carolina Moon" (song)
- Carolina Moon (1940 film)
- Carolina Moon (2007 film), based on the 2000 Nora Roberts novel
- Carolina Moon (2000 novel)

== See also ==
- Operation Carolina Moon, a US military operation during the Vietnam War
