= Source Code (disambiguation) =

Source Code is a 2011 science fiction action thriller.

Source Code may also refer to:

- Source Code (soundtrack), album to the 2011 film Source Code
- Source Code (memoir), by Bill Gates, 2025

== See also ==
- Source code, in computing, human-readable plain text programming code
- Help:Wikitext, the markup language and source code used to edit wiki pages, also known as "source editing"
