= Gnomeo & Juliet (soundtrack) =

Gnomeo & Juliet (Original Motion Picture Soundtrack)

Soundtrack album by Elton John, James Newton Howard and Chris Bacon
- Released: February 1, 2011
- Recorded: 2008–2011
- Studio: Abbey Road Studios
- Genres: Pop; rock; orchestral
- Length: 60:24
- Label: Buena Vista
- Producers: Elton John; David Furnish; Jim Weidman; Stuart Michael Thomas; Chris Montan (exec.)

Elton John chronology
The Union (2010)	Gnomeo & Juliet (2011)	Good Morning to the Night (2012)

James Newton Howard chronology
The Green Hornet (2011)	Gnomeo & Juliet (2011)	Water for Elephants (2011)

Chris Bacon chronology
Source Code (2011)	Gnomeo & Juliet (2011)	Wonder Woman (2011)

Gnomeo & Juliet (Original Motion Picture Soundtrack) is the soundtrack to the 2011 film Gnomeo & Juliet released on February 1, 2011 by Walt Disney Records' imprint label Buena Vista Records. The album featured music from Elton John, who was also the film's executive producer, and who also composed two original songs for the film with lyrics by Bernie Taupin. The album also featured selections from James Newton Howard and Chris Bacon's score compositions.

== Background ==
The album consisted of Elton John's performances from his studio albums and collaborations with Bernie Taupin. Apart from his solo performances, it also had duets such as "Crocodile Rock" (with Nelly Furtado) and "Don't Go Breaking My Heart" (with Kiki Dee). It also featured "The Tiki Tiki Tiki Room", an official song for Walt Disney's Enchanted Tiki Room that has been performed by Fulton Burley, The Mellomen, Thurl Ravenscroft and Wally Boag. John noted that Dick Cook, former chairman at Walt Disney Studios, had suggested that he and Taupin write new songs for the film. He also enlisted James Newton Howard, his one-time arranger, and keyboard player in the Elton John Band.

Two original songs for the film titled "Hello, Hello" and "Love Builds A Garden" with lyrics by Taupin were featured in the film. Taupin added that "I had to re-evaluate myself with any pop sensibilities still lurking in my decidedly un-pop brain. Cue some old Beatles circa Magical Mystery Tour and voila, that sounded like a good starting point." The track "Hello, Hello" had a solo and duet performance, with Lady Gaga. Gaga recorded the track during The Monster Ball Tour; she had to record her parts separately in Scandinavia and New York City. John said that "she added so much of her own magic to the song and gave it a new life. Obviously, it was a duet and I was looking for someone to sing it with. Because she's one of my new best friends and I love her to death, it was nice that she was so excited to do it. That was a real plus for us, and it worked out brilliantly." The duet performance was not included in the soundtrack, which only had solo performances by John. On May 4, 2011, the duet was leaked online and made available for download on most sharing websites.

== Reception ==
Music critic Jonathan Broxton wrote for Movie Music UK, "Although Gnomeo & Juliet is not going to be a big hit with traditional score fans who are looking for 'proper' James Newton Howard material, I actually found myself enjoying this album quite a bit. As an Elton John fan, I've always liked his songs, and the way Bacon and Howard treat them in the score is clever and fun, which is a lot more than you can say about a lot of film music these days." Kimberly Vetrano of She Scribes called it, "a great album that both adults and children can enjoy together". Filmtracks.com wrote, "Gnomeo & Juliet is targeted firmly at John listeners, so unless you film score collectors out there want to hear Howard and crew simply adapt John's songs into a decent but rather generic underscore, steer clear. That said, about nine minutes of that score is quite easy on the ears, the "Dandelions" suite a strong addition to any collection of lightly romantic movie music."

== Accolades ==
The song "Hello Hello" by Elton John and Lady Gaga was nominated for the Golden Globe Award for Best Original Song at the 69th Golden Globe Awards, the Satellite Award for Best Original Song at the 16th Satellite Awards, and the Critics' Choice Movie Award for Best Song at the 17th Critics' Choice Awards.

== Track listing ==
#	Title	Writers	Length	Performer/s	Notes
1	"Hello Hello"	Elton John, Bernie Taupin	3:45	Elton John	
2	"Crocodile Rock"	E. John, B. Taupin	3:28	Nelly Furtado	
3	"Saturday Night's Alright for Fighting"	E. John, B. Taupin	4:54	Elton John	From Goodbye Yellow Brick Road, 1974
4	"Don't Go Breaking My Heart"	E. John, B. Taupin	4:33	Elton John, Kiki Dee	Recorded 1976
5	"Love Builds a Garden"	E. John, B. Taupin	3:35	Elton John	
6	"Your Song"	E. John, B. Taupin	4:01	Elton John	From Elton John, 1970
7	"Rocket Man"	E. John, B. Taupin	4:42	Elton John	From Honky Château, 1972
8	"Tiny Dancer"	E. John, B. Taupin	6:14	Elton John	From Madman Across the Water, 1971
9	"Bennie and the Jets"	E. John, B. Taupin	5:23	Elton John	From Goodbye Yellow Brick Road, 1974
10	"Gnomeo and Juliet"	Chris Bacon, James Newton Howard	4:22	Orchestra	
11	"Dandelions"	C. Bacon, J. Newton Howard	4:25	Orchestra	
12	"Bennie and the Bunnies"	C. Bacon, J. Newton Howard	2:52	Orchestra	
13	"Terrafirminator"	C. Bacon, J. Newton Howard	5:35	Orchestra	
14	"The Tiki, Tiki, Tiki Room"	Richard M. Sherman, Robert B. Sherman	2:03	Wally Boag, Fulton Burley, Thurl Ravenscroft, The Mellomen	Recorded for Disneyland, 1963

- Songs that were included in the film but not included in the album are: "Don't Cha", by Busta Rhymes and CeeLo Green, the 1944
  Fred Heatherton song "I've Got a Lovely Bunch of Coconuts", and the Elton John songs "Sorry Seems to Be the Hardest Word",
  "I'm Still Standing" and "The Bitch Is Back".

== Credits ==
- Conductor: Pete Anthony, Paul Buckmaster, John Ashton Thomas
- Soprano: Grace Davidson, Joanna Forbes L'Estrange, Emily Yarrow
- Guitar: George Doering, Frank Clark, Colin Green, Clive Hicks, Davey Johnstone,
  Michael Landau, Dean Parks, Caleb Quaye, Stuart Michael Thomas.
  Pedal Steel: B.J. Cole
- Bass: David Glover, Dee Murray, Kenny Passarelli
- Keyboards: David Hentschel, James Newton Howard, Stuart Michael Thomas
- Drums: Barry Morgan, Nigel Olsson, Andy Parker, Roger Pope
- Percussion: Ray Cooper
- Trumpet: Daniel Newell
- Trombone: Peter Davies
- Clarinet: Nicholas Bucknall
- Double Bass: Steve Mair, Dave Richmond, Allen Walley
- Cello: Paul Kegg
- Harp: Skaila Kanga
- Viola: Rachel Bolt, George Robertson, Bruce White
- Violin: Mark Berrow, Tom Pigott-Smith, Warren Zielinski
- Backing Vocals: Curt Boettcher, Cidny Bullens, Tony Burrows, Roger Cook,
  Ann De Renais, Lesley Duncan, Sarah Eyden, Soophia Foroughi, Ken Gold,
  Jon Joyce, Dee Murray, Nigel Olsson, Barry St. John, Terry Steele, Liza Strike,
  Sue and Sunny
