= Brazen (film) =

- Poster
- Directed by: Monika Mitchell
- Screenplay by: Suzette Couture; Donald Martin; Edithe Swensen
- Based on: Brazen Virtue by Nora Roberts
- Produced by: Stephanie Germain; Peter Guber; Peter E. Strauss
- Starring: Alyssa Milano; Sam Page; Matthew Finlan
- Cinematography: Robert Aschmann
- Edited by: Christopher A. Smith
- Music by: James Jandrisch; Jeff Tymoschuk
- Production companies: Eponymous Production; Mandalay Pictures
- Distributed by: Netflix
- Release date: January 13, 2022
- Running time: 94 minutes
- Country: United States
- Language: English

Brazen is a 2022 American thriller film directed by Monika Mitchell. It is based on Nora Roberts' 1988 novel Brazen Virtue. The film stars Alyssa Milano, Sam Page, and Matthew Finlan.

Brazen was released on January 13, 2022, by Netflix.

== Plot ==
Online dominatrix "Desiree" entertains clients before logging off and removing her outfit, changing back to her normal self.

Mystery writer Grace Miller is called home to Washington D.C by her sister Kathleen and finds out Kathleen is trying to gain custody of her son after quitting drugs and getting a teaching job, but she is facing backlash from her ex-husband Jonathan. Kathleen also reveals she wants to blackmail him so she can keep their house.

Grace meets Kathleen's neighbor, homicide detective Ed Jennings, and the two instantly hit it off and plan a date. Meanwhile, Kathleen goes online as "Desiree" before being strangled to death by an unknown assailant who has hacked her address.

Grace inserts herself into the investigation despite Ed's reservations. The two visit Fantasy Inc, the company Kathleen worked for, and discover it is a small business and that her character, "Desiree," was the most popular artist.

After, Grace goes to the school Kathleen worked for to try and find clues and runs into one of her students, Jerald Baxter. He tells her he saw Kathleen and janitor Billy Sachs talking and that she left upset. Billy reveals that he found out about Kathleen's secret and told her to be careful; he knew this because his cousin Richie is the webcam operator for Fantasy Inc.

Meanwhile, another performer from Fantasy Inc. is killed during a live session. Watching the footage, Grace and the detectives discover the killer called her "Desiree," leading them to believe the two murders are connected. Grace confronts Jonathan at Kathleen's funeral, but he brushes her off. She discovers a card with flowers that says Kathleen is "where she belongs" and the detectives track the flowers purchase to Rand, one of Kathleen's students who is very wealthy. After a third performer is attacked and survives, her description of her attacker leads the detectives to arrest Rand. However, Grace discovers Rand is actually gay but closeted and was with Richie, who is his boyfriend, during both of the other murders.

Grace, now a consultant for the case, grows closer to Ed and the two sleep together. The next morning, she proposes the idea to the detectives that she pretend to be Desiree to lure out the killer. Ed protests and is angry she did not mention it before; the captain green lights the idea anyway. At the high school, Rand confronts Jerald about being attracted to Desiree and "getting off" to her, however Jerald angrily calls her "my Kathleen," revealing his deep emotional attachment to her before assaulting Rand and putting him in the hospital. After the police interview Rand, they determine Jerald is the most likely suspect and go to his house to arrest him; however, he is not there.

Jerald shows up to Kathleen's while Grace is alone and reveals himself as the killer, noting she does not seem surprised. She reveals she knows why he killed Kathleen - that she was a replacement for his emotionally distant mother, but that once she became a dominatrix it was too close to the cold and dominating personality of his mother so he had to kill her. He admits he killed the two performers and tried to kill the third, before confessing he plans to kill Grace and then his mother but make his mother's death look like an accident. Grace reveals she had the live feed on, broadcasting his confession. He attacks her and gets ahold of the gun Kathleen had hidden before Ed arrives and fatally shoots him.

Some time later, Ed and Grace cuddle on the couch while discussing their potential future relationship.

== Cast ==
- Alyssa Milano as Grace Miller
- Sam Page as Ed Jennings
- Malachi Weir as Ben
- Emilie Ullerup as Kathleen Breezewood/Desiree
- Matthew Aaron Finlan as Jerald Baxter/Hacker
- Alison Araya as Captain Rivera
- Colleen Wheeler as Senator Baxter
- David Lewis as Jonathan Breezewood
- Daniel Diemer as Rand Morgan
- Barry Levy as Paul Morgan
- Aaron Paul Stewart as Billy
- Lossen Chambers as Stacey White
- Amira Anderson as Bookstore Manager
- April Telek as Lisa Clark
- Jack Armstrong as Richie
- Nikki Bryce as Richie's Mom
- Matt Bellefleur as Lawrence Mark
- Mitra Suri as Carol Hayes/Roxanne
- Orphée Ladouceur-Nguyen as Mary Beth Morrison/Raven
- Jesse Vlahovic as Grocery Store Kid
- Miguel Castillo as Dr. Carmona
- Leslie Kwan as Forensics
- Michael Q. Adams as Catholic Priest
- Trace Schurko as Kevin
- Lynn Colliar as Reporter

== Production ==
In January 2021, it was announced Alyssa Milano would star in a feature film adaption of Nora Roberts’ romance thriller Brazen Virtue with Monika Mitchell directing.

Following the announcement of Milano's casting as Grace, Nora Roberts' Facebook page was inundated with negative responses from sections of her fan base who were critical of Milano's role in the #MeToo movement and criticism of Donald Trump's administration. Roberts was quoted:

I'm delighted Ms. Milano's been cast in the adaptation of Brazen Virtue for Netflix. To say I was stunned and appalled by some of the comments regarding the announcement on my Facebook page is a wild understatement. I spoke my piece, posted it publicly, and stand by it and Ms. Milano. To those who state they'll never read my work again due to differing political viewpoints and opinions, or because a talented, experienced actor will play a role, I can only say that's their choice. I believe Ms. Milano and I will survive it.

== Release ==
The movie was released on Netflix's service January 13, 2022.

== Reception ==
The review aggregator website Rotten Tomatoes reported an approval rating of 14% based on 22 reviews.
