= Peter Guber =

American businessman, educator and author

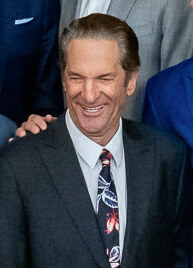
- Guber in 2023
- Born: Howard Peter Guber; March 1, 1942 (age 84); Boston, Massachusetts, U.S.
- Education: Syracuse University (BA); New York University (JD, LLM)
- Occupations: Producer, executive, entrepreneur
- Years active: 1977-present
- Spouse: Tara Gellis (m. 1964)
- Children: 4
- Awards: 4× NBA champion (2015, 2017, 2018, 2022); 3x World Series champion (2020, 2024, 2025); 1x MLS Cup (2022); 1x WNBA champion (2026)

Howard Peter Guber (born March 1, 1942) is an American film producer, business executive, entrepreneur, educator, and author. He is chairman and CEO of Mandalay Entertainment. By 2001, Guber's films had grossed over $3 billion worldwide and received 50 Academy Award nominations.

Guber holds minority ownership in five professional sports teams: the Golden State Warriors of the National Basketball Association, the Golden State Valkyries of the Women's National Basketball Association, the Los Angeles Dodgers of Major League Baseball, Los Angeles Football Club of Major League Soccer, and the professional eSports organization aXiomatic Gaming, with a controlling interest in one of the world's premier eSports franchises, Team Liquid. He is also co-executive chairman of the Golden State Warriors.

Guber formerly served as chairman of Dick Clark Productions, which produces the American Music Awards, the Golden Globe Awards, and other shows. He was also chairman of the Strategic Board; was an investor in NextVR, which was sold to Apple in 2020; and is chairman of Mandalay Sports Media. He is co-executive chairman of aXiomatic, a broad-based esports and gaming company. He is a Regent of the University of California and a professor at the UCLA School of Theater, Film, and Television and the UCLA Anderson School of Management. For ten years, Guber was an entertainment and media analyst for Fox Business.

Guber's most recent business book, Tell to Win: Connect, Persuade, and Triumph with the Hidden Power of Story, became a No. 1 New York Times bestseller.

Guber is also noted for other books that include Inside the Deep and Shootout: Surviving Fame and (Mis)Fortune in Hollywood, which became a television series on AMC called Shootout. Guber hosted the show from 2003 to 2008 with Peter Bart, editor of Variety. Guber wrote a cover article for the Harvard Business Review, titled "The Four Truths of the Storyteller".

== Early life ==
Guber was born into a Jewish family in Boston, Massachusetts, the son of Ruth (née Anshen) and Sam Guber (married in 1929). His father owned a junk business in Somerville, Massachusetts. He attended John Ward Elementary School and Newton North High School.

Following high school graduation, Guber enrolled in the pre-law curriculum at Syracuse University. He played intramural football and rushed the Zeta Beta Tau fraternity. Guber spent his junior year abroad at Syracuse's Florence, Italy, campus. At Syracuse, he met his future wife, Tara Lynda Francine Gellis, whom he married in 1964.

Guber enrolled at New York University, where he earned his J.D. and LL.M. law degrees, studying for his MBA at night. As he neared graduation in 1968, Guber accepted a position with Columbia Pictures as a management trainee.

== Career ==
=== Columbia Pictures ===
Guber joined Columbia Pictures in 1968 as an assistant to Jerry Tokofsky, who headed the studio's creative affairs department, which had the tasks of evaluating scripts and overseeing actors, directors, and producers. Tokofsky later spoke warmly of Guber's usefulness to him.

A year after arriving at Columbia, Guber, having witnessed a demonstration of an early video cassette machine, published "The New Ballgame/The Cartridge Revolution", an analysis of the changes to be wrought by home video technology, in the journal Cinema.

Guber was transferred to the business affairs division. Guber paid to fly himself to Columbia's New York City office and successfully argued for his promotion to vice president of creative affairs. Shortly thereafter, Guber was named head of American production. In August 1973, he was promoted to vice-president of worldwide production. Steven Spielberg noted that he "used to go to (Guber's) office at Columbia when he was just starting. (Guber) had an enormous chart on his wall with what every director in the world was planning that listed their pictures in development and planned for production." It made a lasting impression on Spielberg.

During his time at Columbia, the studio released, among other films, Shampoo, Taxi Driver, Tommy, and The Way We Were. Upon leaving Columbia in 1975, Guber was given a three-year production deal with the studio.

=== Independent producer ===
Guber launched his career as an independent film producer with The Deep (1977), which became one of the highest-grossing films of the year. Guber also bought the rights and served as executive producer for Midnight Express (1978). Produced by Alan Marshall and David Puttnam, the film earned seven Academy Award nominations, including Best Picture. The National Association of Theatre Owners named Guber Producer of the Year.

=== Casablanca Record and Filmworks ===
In 1976, Guber merged his company Filmworks with Casablanca Records, headed by Neil Bogart, to form Casablanca Record and Filmworks, Inc. Guber became chairman while Bogart remained president of the combined company. Their record operation included artists such as Kiss, Donna Summer, Captain and Tennille, The Village People, and George Clinton's Parliament-Funkadelic. It also released soundtracks such as Midnight Express, Endless Love, and Flashdance. During this period, Guber also produced several television shows and series, including Television and the Presidency (1984) with Theodore H. White, the 1985 documentary series Oceanquest for NBC, and the 1980 special Mysteries of the Sea for ABC.

=== PolyGram Filmed Entertainment and the Guber-Peters Company ===
In 1980, Guber rechristened the film division of Casablanca Filmworks as PolyGram Pictures, PolyGram's motion picture and television division, where he was Chairman of the Board and CEO. He, Neil Bogart, and Jon Peters were planning to be partners of Boardwalk Records, but Guber instead joined PolyGram Pictures at the last minute. He sold his interest in PolyGram in 1982 and then formed and served as co-owner of the Guber-Peters Company (GPC) along with producer Jon Peters.

Films on which Guber served as producer or executive producer have earned more than $3 billion in worldwide revenue and more than 50 Academy Award nominations, including four Best Picture nominations. Guber's producing credits during this period include Rain Man, Batman, Gorillas in the Mist, The Color Purple, Innerspace, The Witches of Eastwick, Flashdance, Missing, Tango & Cash, and An American Werewolf in London.

=== Sony Pictures ===
In 1988, GPC became a public company when it merged with game show production company Barris Industries. On September 7, 1989, Barris Industries was renamed Guber-Peters Entertainment Company. On September 28, 1989, Sony Corporation announced its intention to buy GPEC. The sale was completed on November 9, 1989, a day after Sony acquired Columbia Pictures Entertainment.

During Guber's tenure as co-chairman and CEO at SPE, the company produced and distributed films such as Awakenings, Misery, Flatliners, Terminator 2: Judgment Day, Boyz n the Hood, City Slickers, Basic Instinct, A League of Their Own, Single White Female, A River Runs Through It, A Few Good Men, Sleepless in Seattle, In the Line of Fire, Groundhog Day and Philadelphia. SPE's Motion Picture Group achieved, over four years, an industry-best domestic box office market share, which averaged seventeen percent. During the same period, Sony Pictures led all competitors with 120 Academy Award nominations, the highest four-year total ever for a single company. SPE also created and distributed many prime time, half-hour comedy television series at the time, with shows including Married... with Children, Designing Women, Seinfeld, Mad About You and The Nanny.

=== Mandalay Entertainment ===
In 1994, Guber formed Mandalay Entertainment as an independent production company, with its films distributed by Sony Pictures Entertainment. The Sony distribution agreement was replaced by a new deal with Paramount in 1998, with Mandalay moving is headquarters to Paramount Pictures. The multimedia entertainment company has interests in motion pictures, television, sports entertainment, and digital media.

=== Mandalay Pictures ===
Mandalay Pictures, a division of Mandalay Entertainment Group, produces motion pictures for the global marketplace.

=== Mandalay Vision ===
Mandalay Vision was Mandalay Entertainment Group's independent development, production, and financing label. Mandalay Vision's first release, The Kids Are All Right (2010), directed by Lisa Cholodenko and starring Julianne Moore, Annette Bening and Mark Ruffalo, won the Golden Globe for Best Motion Picture – Musical or Comedy, and was nominated for four Academy Awards, including Best Picture.

Mandalay Vision produced Bernie (2011), which premiered at the Los Angeles Film Festival. The film was directed by Richard Linklater and starred Jack Black, Matthew McConaughey and Shirley MacLaine. Bernie debuted at No. 1 on general release in April 2012 with the best per-theater average for a limited release. Jack Black received a Golden Globe nomination, and the film gained two Spirit Award nominations, as well as a Best Picture nomination at the 2012 Gotham Awards.

Title	Released	Actors	Director
The Voices	2015	Anna Kendrick, Gemma Arterton, Ryan Reynolds	Marjane Satrapi
Horns	2013	Juno Temple, Daniel Radcliffe, Heather Graham	Alexandre Aja
Bernie	2011	Jack Black, Shirley MacLaine, Matthew McConaughey	Richard Linklater
Salvation Boulevard	2011	Pierce Brosnan, Jennifer Connelly, Greg Kinnear	George Ratliff
Another Happy Day	2011	Ellen Barkin, Ellen Burstyn, Kate Bosworth	Sam Levinson
Vanishing on 7th Street	2010	Hayden Christensen, Thandie Newton, John Leguizamo	Brad Anderson
The Whistleblower	2011	Rachel Weisz, Vanessa Redgrave, David Strathairn	Larysa Kondracki
Soul Surfer	2010	AnnaSophia Robb, Dennis Quaid, Helen Hunt	Sean McNamara
The Kids Are All Right	2010	Annette Bening, Julianne Moore, Mark Ruffalo	Lisa Cholodenko

=== Mandalay Television ===
Mandalay Television produces made-for-television movies and mini-series.

Title	Released	Produced For
Dean Koontz's Intensity	2003	Fox
Get to the Heart: The Barbara Mandrell Story	1997	CBS
Final Descent	1997	CBS
Medusa's Child	1997	ABC
Bad As I Wanna Be	1998	ABC
Ali, King of the World	2000	ABC
Sole Survivor	2011	Fox
First Daughter	2004	Turner
The Linda McCartney Story	2000	CBS

Mandalay Television's Blood Crime, starring James Caan and Jonathan Schaech, was USA Network's highest rated Crime Friday movie for 2002.

From best-selling author Nora Roberts, Guber adapted a number of books into Lifetime movies. More than 34 million viewers tuned in to the first collection of four movies: Angels Fall, Blue Smoke, Carolina Moon and Montana Sky.

Following the initial Nora Roberts' adaptations, Mandalay Television produced the Nora Roberts II Collection, with four more all-new original movies: Northern Lights, Midnight Bayou, High Noon and Tribute. The second collection was seen by over 49 million viewers, and Northern Lights was one of the top rated cable movies in 2009. Mandalay Television completed the ninth installment in the franchise, Carnal Innocence, starring Gabrielle Anwar, which premiered on Lifetime in June 2011. The tenth movie, Brazen Virtue, will soon be produced for Netflix.

=== Mandalay Sports Entertainment ===
Guber serves as chairman of the board of directors and is the managing partner of Mandalay Baseball LLC, which is a joint venture with ownership of the Los Angeles Dodgers. Mandalay Baseball formerly owned the Oklahoma City Dodgers, the Triple-A affiliated Minor League Baseball franchise.

Guber previously served as the chairman of the board of directors for Mandalay Baseball Properties which has owned and operated a national array of affiliated Minor League Baseball franchises and venues. Among the professional sports franchises that have been recently divested by Mandalay Baseball Properties are the Dayton Dragons, a Single-A affiliate of the Cincinnati Reds, which broke the all-time North American professional sports record for consecutive sell outs in 2011 with 815 games encompassing 12 seasons. In August 2014, the team was sold for the highest price ever paid for a Minor League Baseball franchise.

=== Mandalay Sports Media ===
In 2012, Guber and Mandalay Entertainment partnered with CAA Sports and Mike Tollin to create Mandalay Sports Media. The sports media business creates, finances, and acquires operating businesses, intellectual property, and varied enterprises within the sports and media sectors, as well as develops sports-themed entertainment programming for distribution across film, television, mobile, and digital.

Mandalay Sports Media made The Last Dance, a ten-part documentary series that chronicles Michael Jordan and the 1990s Chicago Bulls dynasty, which premiered on ESPN on April 19, 2020. Created in partnership with Netflix, the series became the all-time most-viewed documentary on the network. In 2020, The Last Dance was nominated for three Emmy Awards, and won the Emmy for Outstanding Documentary or Nonfiction Series. The series also won the NAACP Image Award for Outstanding Documentary (Television) and the Producers Guild Award for Outstanding Producer of Non-Fiction Television.

=== Dick Clark Productions ===
In September 2012, Peter Guber and Mandalay Entertainment joined a partnership that purchased Dick Clark Productions from Red Zone Capital Management. Productions include specials such as The Golden Globes, The American Music Awards, The Academy of Country Music Awards, New Year's Rockin' Eve, and the hit reality show So You Think You Can Dance. The partnership sold DCP in 2016.

=== Golden State Warriors ===
Peter Guber serves as the Co-Executive Chairman of the Golden State Warriors. As co-managing partner, he joined Joe Lacob as the driving forces behind the current ownership group's NBA record-setting bid to purchase the Warriors in 2010. He owns an estimated 15% of the team.

The Warriors won their first NBA championship under Guber and Lacob's leadership in the 2014-15 NBA season. The Golden State Warriors also won the 2014 Sports Business Journal Award for Team of the Year, with the publication noting that the team "continued a sharp trajectory in 2013 under owners Joe Lacob and Peter Guber that produced strong, extensive on- and off-court gains". Lacob has said of Guber "he cares more than any owner about the team, the image of the team and what the fans think."

Continuing their success, the Warriors went on to win back-to-back NBA championships in the 2016-17 NBA season and the 2017–18 NBA season. In 2018, the Golden State Warriors were named Sports Illustrated's Sportsperson of the Year. In 2019, the Golden State Warriors were named Franchise of the Decade across all professional sports teams by the Sports Business Journal.

In October 2015, Guber and Lacob purchased twelve acres of land in San Francisco's Mission Bay neighborhood to build a privately financed new arena. The move would mark the Warriors' return to a home arena in San Francisco (from Oakland) for the first time in more than four decades. In September 2019, the Warriors opened the Chase Center, the first arena of its type in downtown San Francisco, and played their first game there in October 2019. The $1.4 billion sports and entertainment venue hosts major sporting events, concerts, conventions, family shows and more. With this arena, the Warriors officially transitioned from a basketball team into a sports and entertainment company. In September 2020, the Sports Business Journal named the Chase Center Sports Facility of the Year. "This award is a recognition of the vision, planning, and execution that went into making Chase Center a world-class sports and entertainment venue," said Warriors President and Chief Operating Officer Rick Welts. "Chase Center sets the bar when it comes to an immersive fan experience and world-class NBA team amenities." The Warriors now lead all major professional teams with four Sports Business Awards.

In the 2021–2022, the Warriors were again crowned NBA champions.

=== Los Angeles Dodgers ===
Guber is a minority owner of the 2020, 2024, and 2025 World Series winning Los Angeles Dodgers, with an estimated 3% stake in the team. In 2012, Guber entered into a third partnership with Magic Johnson and teamed up with Guggenheim Baseball Management to purchase the storied Major League Baseball franchise. Together, the group made the $2.15 billion winning offer, which more than doubled the previous record price for a North American sports franchise." Under their ownership, the franchise has won the 2013, 2014, 2015, 2016, 2017, 2018, 2020 and 2024 National League West championships. In 2017, 2018, 2020, 2024, and 2025 the Dodgers became National League champions, earning them a place in the World Series. In 2020, the Dodgers captured the ultimate prize in baseball, bringing the Commissioner's Trophy back to Los Angeles for the first time in thirty-two years. The Dodgers were World Series Champions again in 2024 and 2025, repeating as back-to-back champions for the first time in franchise history. Additionally, Guber owned and served as Managing Partner of the Dodgers' Triple- A affiliate, the Oklahoma City Dodgers. In 2018, the Oklahoma City Dodgers were named the Triple-A winner of the Bob Freitas Award, an honor presented to Minor League Baseball's top franchise based on community involvement, long-term business success, and consistent operational excellence.

=== Los Angeles Football Club ===
In October 2014, Peter Guber became the owner and executive chairman of Major League Soccer's Los Angeles Football Club (LAFC). The ownership group includes sports veteran Tom Penn, Earvin "Magic" Johnson, Mia Hamm Garciaparra and Tony Robbins, among others. The club debuted in 2018 in a newly constructed, state-of-the-art soccer stadium in the greater Los Angeles area that was built specifically for the team. LAFC's Banc of California Stadium is the first open-air stadium built in Los Angeles since Dodger Stadium in 1962.

In only its second season, LAFC won the 2019 MLS' Supporters' Shield, awarded each year to the team with the best regular season record. That same year, Fast Company named LAFC one of the world's most innovative companies.

In 2020, LAFC's star forward, Diego Rossi, was awarded the MLS Golden Boot award as the top goal scorer of the year in all of Major League Soccer.

In 2022, LAFC became MLS Cup champions after only four seasons. In 2024, the club won the Lamar Hunt US Open Cup.

=== Author ===
Guber's most recent book, published in 2011, is Tell To Win - Connect, Persuade, and Triumph with the Hidden Power of Story, which became a No. 1 bestseller in The New York Times, USA Today, The Wall Street Journal. Fortune magazine chose Tell To Win as one of their "5 Business Books You Can Really Use". The book focuses on Guber's belief in the power of storytelling, and how this defines his role in the "emotional transportation business".

Guber's other books include Inside the Deep and the Los Angeles Times best-seller Shootout: Surviving Fame and (Mis)Fortune in Hollywood. Guber authored a cover piece for the Harvard Business Review and op-ed pieces for The New York Times.

Of Tell To Win, President Bill Clinton said "In TELL TO WIN, Peter Guber demonstrates that telling purposeful stories is the best way to persuade, motivate and convince who you want to do what you need."

Robert A. Iger, former president and chief executive officer of The Walt Disney Company said "TELL TO WIN gives great insight into why good storytelling skills are essential for a successful leader. It's both an engaging read and a great practical guide on how to listen, prepare and marshal facts to tell the right kind of story to the right audience."

=== Professor and regent of the University of California ===
Guber is a professor at the UCLA School of Theater, Film, and Television and has been a member of the faculty for over 40 years, teaching courses on leadership, digital media, sports entertainment and business storytelling. He also teaches at the UCLA Anderson School of Management.

Of his storytelling course, Guber said, "I wanted students to recognize the power of narrative," he said. "Storytelling is not frivolous entertainment. It's an inspirational and professional tool that can bring life into focus."

He is a member of the UCLA Foundation board of trustees, as well as the winner of UCLA's Service Award for his accomplishments and association with the university. Guber is the chair of the founding board of advisors for the Center for Managing Enterprises in Media, Entertainment & Sports (MEMES) at the UCLA Anderson School of Management. In 2017, Guber received the UCLA Medal, the highest honor bestowed upon an individual by UCLA.

In 2017, Guber was appointed to the University of California board of regents by the governor of California, Edmund G. Brown Jr. As Regent of the University of California, Guber is part of the governing board responsible for the oversight of all university affairs, providing guidance and perspective on important issues facing public higher education in California.

=== Speaker ===
In 2012, Guber was named one of the "Twelve Great Speakers of the Year" by Successful Meetings magazine. Guber's national and global speaking events include Cisco, JWT, Under Armour, Alcoa, HSBC, Twitter, Sodexo, Milken Institute, Intel, Korn Ferry, Women's Wear Daily CEO Summit, Wharton Leadership Conference, GAP Inc, John Hancock Life Insurance, Experian Marketing, Del Monte Foods, Cox Media Group, and Comcast.

=== aXiomatic and Team Liquid ===
In 2016, Washington Wizards and Washington Capitals owner Ted Leonsis, former Sony Interactive Entertainment CEO Bruce Stein and Guber founded aXiomatic, a bi-coastal ownership group with a focus on investing in and acquiring e-sports companies. Leonsis, Stein and Guber recruited Magic Johnson, AOL co-founder Steve Case, and others as investors in aXiomatic. In September 2016, aXiomatic announced it had acquired the controlling interest in esports Team Liquid and appointed Leonsis, Stein and Guber to its board. AXiomatic would receive investment from Tampa Bay Lightning owner Jeff Vinik in June 2017 and Warriors co-owner and Oaktree Capital co-founder Bruce Karsh in March 2018.

AXiomatic acquired controlling interest the e-sports brand Team Liquid in 2016. Through strategic partnerships, investments and acquisitions, the team connects e-sports groups with resources, including venues, technologies, media content, distributions partners and investment capital. In 2018, aXiomatic participated in a $1.25 billion strategic investment round for Epic Games, maker of Fortnite, one of the most-played and popular titles ever. In January 2019, aXiomatic participated in a $245 million strategic investment round for Niantic, Inc., maker of Harry Potter: Wizards Unite and Pokémon Go, an incredibly successful title that surpassed the $2 billion revenue mark in June 2018. Team Liquid won the 2017 and 2024 The International DOTA Championships.

== Personal life ==
Guber is married to Lynda Francine "Tara" Gellis, with whom he has four children: Elizabeth Sugarman, Jodi Brufsky, Samuel Guber, and Jackson Guber.

== Filmography ==
=== Film ===
Year	Film	Credit	Notes
1977	The Deep		
1978	Midnight Express	Executive producer	
1981	An American Werewolf in London	Executive producer	
1982	Missing	Executive producer	Uncredited
1982	Six Weeks		
1983	Flashdance	Executive producer	
1983	D.C. Cab	Executive producer	
1985	Vision Quest		
1985	The Legend of Billie Jean	Executive producer	
1985	Clue	Executive producer	
1985	The Color Purple	Executive producer	
1985	Head Office	Executive producer	
1986	The Clan of the Cave Bear	Executive producer	
1986	Youngblood	Executive producer	
1987	The Witches of Eastwick		
1987	Innerspace	Executive producer	
1987	Who's That Girl	Executive producer	
1988	Caddyshack II		
1988	Gorillas in the Mist	Executive producer	
1988	Missing Link	Executive producer	
1988	Rain Man	Executive producer	
1989	Batman		
1989	Tango & Cash		
1990	The Bonfire of the Vanities	Executive producer	
1992	Batman Returns	Executive producer	
1993	This Boy's Life	Executive producer	
1994	With Honors	Executive producer	
2003	Alex & Emma	Executive producer	
2005	The Jacket		
2005	Into the Blue	Executive producer	
2017	Mark Felt: The Man Who Brought Down the White House	Executive producer	
2022	Brazen		
2023	Heart of a Lion		
2023	Air		
2025	Highest 2 Lowest	Executive producer	

Miscellaneous crew

Year	Film	Role	Notes
1973	The Way We Were	Executive in charge	Uncredited
1975	Shampoo	Executive in charge	Uncredited
1975	Tommy	Executive in charge	Uncredited
1976	Taxi Driver	Executive in charge	Uncredited
2020	Nine Days	Chairman & CEO: Mandalay Pictures	

=== Music department ===
Year	Film	Role
1981	The Pursuit of D. B. Cooper	Executive producer: Soundtrack album

=== Thanks ===
Year	Film	Role
1988	High Spirits	Special thanks
1990	Nuns on the Run	Special thanks
2018	Amateur	Special thanks
2019	Io	Special thanks
2019	Otherhood	Thanks

=== Television ===
Year	Title	Credit	Notes
1980	Mysteries of the Sea	Executive producer	Documentary
1984	Television and the Presidency	Executive producer	Documentary
1984	The Toughest Man in the World	Executive producer	Television film
1984	Dreams		
1985	Oceanquest	Executive producer	Documentary
1986	Brotherhood of Justice	Executive producer	Television film
1986	Clue: Movies, Murder & Mystery	Executive producer	Television special
1987	Bay Coven	Executive producer	Television film
1988	Nightmare at Bittercreek	Executive producer	Television film
1988	Superman 50th Anniversary	Executive producer	Documentary
1989	Finish Line	Executive producer	Television film
1998−99	Mercy Point	Executive producer	
1998−2000	Oh Baby	Executive producer	
2000	Young Americans	Executive producer	
1998−2001	Rude Awakening	Executive producer	
2006	Square Off	Executive producer	
2007	Angels Fall	Executive producer	Television film
2007	Montana Sky	Executive producer	Television film
2007	Blue Smoke	Executive producer	Television film
2007	Carolina Moon	Executive producer	Television film
2008	Northern Lights	Executive producer	Television film
2009	Midnight Bayou	Executive producer	Television film
2009	High Noon	Executive producer	Television film
2009	Tribute	Executive producer	Television film
2011	Carnal Innocence	Executive producer	Television film
2015	Untitled NBA Project	Executive producer	Television film
2020	The Last Dance	Executive producer	Documentary
2021	I Know What You Did Last Summer	Executive producer	

== Bibliography ==
Guber is the author of three books. His 2011 book, Tell to Win, reached No. 1 on the New York Times Hardcover Advice & Miscellaneous Best Sellers list.

- Peter Guber (1977). Inside the Deep. Bantam. ISBN 978-0-553-11136-1.
- Peter Guber and Peter Bart (2003). Shoot Out. Perigee Trade. ISBN 978-0-399-52888-0.
- Peter Guber (2011). Tell to Win: Connect, Persuade and Triumph With the Hidden Power of Story. Crown Business. ISBN 9780307587954.

== Citations ==
Sporting positions
Preceded by Chris Cohan	Golden State Warriors principal owner 2010–present Served alongside: Joe Lacob	Incumbent
New creation	Golden State Valkyries principal owner 2025–present Served alongside: Joe Lacob	Incumbent
