= Chris Bacon (composer) =

American composer

Chris Bacon is an American composer. His film scores include Alpha and Omega (2010), Source Code (2011), Gnomeo & Juliet (2011), Sherlock Gnomes (2018) and Men in Black: International (2019). He was the composer for all 50 episodes of the A&E drama series Bates Motel, for which he was nominated for an Emmy Award, and also composed the music for 26 of the 32 episodes of the NBC musical drama series Smash.

== Early life and education ==
As a youth Bacon learned to play piano and saxophone, and from an early age he knew he wanted to be a film composer. He has said, "From the point that I could start thinking about what I wanted to do when I grew up... it was always to write movie music."

Bacon received a Bachelor's Degree in music composition from Brigham Young University and completed the Scoring For Motion Pictures and Television program at University of Southern California.

Bacon cites his internship with James Newton Howard as his most valuable musical training, "While I learned a ton from school, my real-world education came under James. It felt like I was on scholarship because I was being paid to learn what it means to be a film composer at the pinnacle of the industry. James gave me my first opportunities on projects that he couldn't fully take on for a variety of reasons, and his endorsement was very comforting to producers who appreciated the work still being performed under his 'umbrella'."

== Career ==
Bacon's solo debut as a film composer came with the 2007 Lifetime film Angels Fall, for which he composed the main theme. Bacon's first solo feature film score was the thriller Source Code. Bacon has also contributed music to many film and TV productions, including American Hustle, Avengers: Age of Ultron, and Goosebumps. Bacon's next project is the Amazon reboot of The Tick, directed by Wally Pfister.

Bacon has been nominated for four Emmy Awards: one for his work on the NBC series Smash, two for this work on the A&E series Bates Motel, three for Amazon Prime series The Tick and four for Netflix series Wednesday.

== Filmography ==
=== Film ===
Year	Title	Director	Notes
2008	Space Chimps	Kirk DeMicco	Composed with Blue Man Group First score for an animated film
2009	Waking Sleeping Beauty	Don Hahn	Documentary
2010	Love Ranch	Taylor Hackford	
2010	Alpha and Omega	Anthony Bell; Benjamin Gluck	
2011	Gnomeo & Juliet	Kelly Asbury	Composed with James Newton Howard
2011	Source Code	Duncan Jones	
2011	Beethoven's Christmas Adventure	John Putch	
2012	High Ground	Michael Brown	Documentary
2012	Atlas Shrugged: Part II	John Putch	
2013	Alpha and Omega 2: A Howl-iday Adventure	Richard Rich	
2015	Being Charlie	Rob Reiner	
2016	Patient Seven	Danny Draven	
2017	Snatched	Jonathan Levine	Composed with Theodore Shapiro
2018	Sherlock Gnomes	John Stevenson	
2018	The Weight of Water	Michael Brown	Documentary
2019	Men in Black: International	F. Gary Gray	Composed with Danny Elfman
2022	Immanence	Kerry Bellessa	
2022	Strong Enough	John Foss	
2023	65	Scott Beck; Bryan Woods	
2024	Heretic	Scott Beck; Bryan Woods	
2025	M3GAN 2.0	Gerard Johnstone	

==== Composer of additional music ====
Year	Title	Director	Composer	Notes
2005	King Kong	Peter Jackson	James Newton Howard	Also score producer
2006	RV	Barry Sonnenfeld	James Newton Howard	
2007	Earth	Alastair Fothergill; Mark Linfield	George Fenton	
2010	Nanny McPhee and the Big Bang	Susanna White	James Newton Howard	
2010	Inhale	Baltasar Kormákur	James Newton Howard	
2011	Water for Elephants	Francis Lawrence	James Newton Howard	
2011	Larry Crowne	Tom Hanks	James Newton Howard	
2011	Arthur Christmas	Sarah Smith	Harry Gregson-Williams	
2013	American Hustle	David O. Russell	Danny Elfman	
2014	Mr. Peabody & Sherman	Rob Minkoff	Danny Elfman	
2014	Paddington	Paul King	Nick Urata	
2015	Avengers: Age of Ultron	Joss Whedon	Danny Elfman; Brian Tyler	
2015	Goosebumps	Rob Letterman	Danny Elfman	
2016	Alice Through the Looking Glass	James Bobin	Danny Elfman	
2017	Tulip Fever	Justin Chadwick	Danny Elfman	
2018	The Grinch	Scott Mosier Yarrow Cheney	Danny Elfman	
2019	Dumbo	Tim Burton	Danny Elfman	
2020	Dolittle	Stephen Gaghan	Danny Elfman	
2022	Doctor Strange in the Multiverse of Madness	Sam Raimi	Danny Elfman	
2022	Disenchanted	Adam Shankman	Alan Menken	
2024	Beetlejuice Beetlejuice	Tim Burton	Danny Elfman	

=== Television ===
Year	Title	Notes
2007	Angels Fall	TV film; composed with Stuart Michael Thomas
2007	Blue Smoke	TV film; composed with Stuart Michael Thomas
2009	Northern Lights	TV film; composed with Stuart Michael Thomas
2009	Midnight Bayou	TV film; composed with Stuart Michael Thomas
2011	Ricochet	TV film
2011	Wonder Woman	TV film
2012	Hornet's Nest	TV film
2012–13	Smash	26 episodes; composed with Marc Shaiman & Scott Wittman
2013	An Amish Murder	TV film
2013	Reckless	TV film
2013–17	Bates Motel	50 episodes
2015	Living with Lincoln	TV film
2016	Finding Fortune	TV film
2016–19	The Tick	22 episodes
2017	A Series of Unfortunate Events	2 episodes
2017	When We Rise	Miniseries; composed with Danny Elfman
2022–present	Wednesday	7 episodes; composed with Danny Elfman

== Awards and nominations ==
Award	Year	Category	Work	Result
Grammy Award	2024	Best Arrangement, Instrumental or A Cappella	"Paint It Black" (from Wednesday)	Nominated
Primetime Emmy Award	2012	Outstanding Music Composition for a Series (Original Dramatic Score)	Smash ("Publicity")	Nominated
Primetime Emmy Award	2016	Outstanding Music Composition for a Series (Original Dramatic Score)	Bates Motel ("Forever")	Nominated
Primetime Emmy Award	2017	Outstanding Original Main Title Theme Music	The Tick	Nominated
Primetime Emmy Award	2023	Outstanding Music Composition for a Series (Original Dramatic Score)	Wednesday ("Woe is the Loneliest Number")	Nominated
World Soundtrack Award	2023	Television Composer of the Year	Wednesday	Nominated
