= Montana Sky =

2007 American romantic television film

- DVD cover
- Genre: Drama; Thriller
- Based on: Montana Sky by Nora Roberts
- Screenplay by: April Smith
- Directed by: Mike Robe
- Starring: Ashley Williams; John Corbett; Charlotte Ross
- Theme music composer: Steve Porcaro
- Country of origin: United States
- Original language: English

Production
- Producer: Salli Newman
- Cinematography: Eric Van Haren Noman
- Running time: 96 minutes
- Production company: Mandalay TV

Original release
- Network: Lifetime
- Release: February 5, 2007

Montana Sky is a 2007 American television film directed by Mike Robe and starring Ashley Williams, John Corbett, and Charlotte Ross. Based on the 1996 Nora Roberts novel of the same name, the film is about a wealthy stock dealer who bequeaths his Montana farm to his three daughters, provided they live on the ranch together for at least one year. Montana Sky is part of the Nora Roberts 2007 movie collection, which also includes Angels Fall, Blue Smoke, and Carolina Moon. The movie debuted on February 5, 2007 on Lifetime.

== Plot ==
Half-sisters Willa, Tess, and Lily Mercy are left their wealthy father's multimillion-dollar estate, including his Montana ranch, after his death. The only stipulation is that the women will have to live with each other for a year.

Having never previously met, the three sisters, who have very different personalities, agree to the strange situation, despite having reservations about their forced family reunion. The biggest problem, however, is the discovery of a saboteur in their midst.

When their father died, he left some bitter enemies behind that wanted to see his daughters fail. In order to get what is rightfully theirs, the three siblings needed to work harder than ever before to clean up the mess their father left behind.

During their trial, all three find love, and realize that maybe their situation wasn't such a bad thing after all.

== Cast ==
- Ashley Williams as Willa Mercy
- John Corbett as Ben McKinnon
- Charlotte Ross as Tess Mercy
- Diane Ladd as Bess
- Laura Mennell as Lily Mercy
- Nathaniel Arcand as Adam Wolfchild
- Aaron Pearl as Nate Torrence
- Tom Carey as Jim
- Scott Heindl as Jesse Carne
- James Baker as Ham
- Donovan Workun as Pickles
- Stephen Hair as Ken Campbell
- James D. Hopkin as Preacher
- Heather Lea MacCallum as Coroner
- James Dugan as Vet

== Production ==
The film was executive produced by Stephanie Germain and Peter Guber, who also executive produced seven other Nora Roberts films for Lifetime in 2007 and 2009. Though set in Montana, the film was actually shot in the provinces of Alberta and British Columbia, Canada.
