= Virtual Obsession =

- Genre: Science fiction
- Based on: Host by Peter James
- Written by: Peter James
- Screenplay by: Preston Sturges Jr.; Mick Garris
- Directed by: Mick Garris
- Starring: Peter Gallagher; Mimi Rogers
- Music by: Nicholas Pike
- Country of origin: United States
- Original language: English

Production
- Producers: Ted Babcock; Mick Garris; Stephanie Germain; David A. Rosemont; Peter Sadowski; Robert M. Sertner; Randy Sutter; David C. Thomas; Frank von Zerneck
- Cinematography: Shelly Johnson
- Editor: Patrick McMahon
- Running time: 180 minutes
- Production companies: Hallmark Entertainment; Stephanie Germain Productions; Von Zerneck Sertner Films

Original release
- Network: ABC
- Release: February 26, 1998

Virtual Obsession is a 1998 science fiction television film directed by Mick Garris and starring Peter Gallagher and Mimi Rogers. It is based on the 1993 novel Host by Peter James.

== Premise ==
Scientist Joe Messenger has created a supercomputer controlling the city's utilities. Juliet Spring, a computer technician who becomes Joe's assistant, is incurably ill and plans to transfer her consciousness to Joe's supercomputer.

== Cast ==
- Peter Gallagher as Dr. Joe Messenger
- Mimi Rogers as Karen Messenger
- Jake Lloyd as Jack
- Andy Comeau as Tom Inman
- Bridgette Wilson as Juliet Spring
- Tom Nibley as Albert
- Charles Grueber as Governor
- David Jensen as Mayor
- Cynthia Garris as Judge Dalrymple
- Frank Gerrish as Coroner
- Mary Bishop as Mary Alice
- Nicole Guertin as Waitress

== Production ==
Virtual Obsession was filmed in Provo and Salt Lake City, Utah.

== Broadcast ==
The film was first broadcast on ABC on Thursday, February 26, 1998, from 8-11 p.m. It has been rerun on cable TV under the title Host.
