= Sea Swept =

- Author: Nora Roberts
- Country: United States
- Language: English
- Genre: Romance
- Publisher: Penguin Books (USA)
- Published: 1998
- Media type: print (hardback & paperback)
- Followed by: Rising Tides

Sea Swept is the first book of four in the Chesapeake Bay novel series. Originally published in 1998.

== Plot summary ==
Cameron Quinn is a champion boat racer who travels the world and enjoys a lifestyle soaked in champagne and women. As a child, Cameron survived abuse before he was adopted by the Quinns after they caught him almost stealing their car. Now Cameron is called back to his childhood hometown of St. Christopher's on the Chesapeake Bay, his father dying from a car accident. He has to leave his reckless life of a daredevil behind and fulfill his father's wishes for him to take care of Seth, a troubled young boy who isn't unlike Cameron once was. Like Cameron and his two brothers - Ethan and Phillip - Seth was adopted by Raymond Quinn in a difficult period of his life.

Cameron has to learn to live with his brothers once again, which isn't easy for three powerful men well accustomed to their own lives. Soon the blossoming Boats by Quinn unites the four Quinns in a craft taught to them by Ray. Problems arise as it becomes apparent that Seth's fate lies in the hands of a beautiful social worker, Anna Spinelli, and while the brothers fight for the right to adopt, Cameron soon finds himself drawn to the warm, driven social worker. While at first speculative, Anna quickly sees that these three men whose murky pasts mirror Seth's are the best caretakers for the spooky, haunted boy. Her immediate attraction to Cameron, while unwelcome, isn't something she can ignore. Meanwhile, Cameron struggles to move past the rhythm of life he was forced to sacrifice and earn the trust of a battered young boy whose story has yet to be told.

== Characters in "Sea Swept" ==
- Cameron Quinn--Cameron is a champion boat racer, powerful and arrogant with a strong temper. Tall and well built, he has black hair and gray eyes. Before he was adopted by the Quinns, Cameron lived with his alcoholic, abusive father in Baltimore until he was thirteen. After a particularly hard beating, Cameron ran away, coming across the Quinns' house and their white Corvette. Caught during his attempt to steal the car, the Quinns decided to offer Cameron a choice of juvenile hall or explaining himself. The second choice led to Cameron's adoption as a Quinn. Of the three brothers, Cameron is the most impetuous.
- Anna Spinelli--Anna is a social worker from Baltimore, strong, smart, and quick-witted. Anna has black hair and dark brown eyes. Of Italian descent, Anna is very dedicated and has Seth's best interests first and foremost in her mind. Unlike the Quinn brothers, she strongly believes in the system she works for. After her mother was attacked and murdered in front of her, Anna finally found her balance after revolting against the system with the help of her maternal grandparents.
- Seth DeLauter--Seth is the young boy Raymond brought home shortly before the car accident that would kill him. Seth is small for his age, with blond hair and blue eyes. Little is known of Seth's past, only that his mother Gloria DeLauter practically sold her son to Raymond. Seth is angry and wary, initially very resentful and fearful of any physical contact. Referred to as "the latest of Ray Quinn's lost boys."
- Ethan Quinn--Ethan is a waterman on the Bay, quiet, faithful, and strong. Tall and powerfully built, he has light brown hair and blue eyes. Ethan's past is very dark, arguably the darkest out of the three brothers. Before being adopted by the Quinns, Ethan's drug-addict mother sold both her son and herself for money. However, he found his place among the Quinns and the two boys who became his two brothers. Of the three brothers, Ethan is the most steady.
- Phillip Quinn--Phillip is an advertising executive in Baltimore, suave, confident, and clever. Tall like his brothers and sleek, he has dark blond hair and golden brown eyes. Phillip nearly died when he was thirteen as a bystander in a gang war, coming to the Quinns as a thief, drug-addict, and snarling degenerate. After falling in love with the Quinns, Phillip embraced school and life in St. Christopher's, growing into a cultured, strong man. Of the three brothers, Phillip is the most elegant.
- Raymond Quinn--Raymond was an English college professor. Topping out at 6' 5" with blond hair and blue eyes, Raymond was a big man with enough heart to take care of three half-grown boys drowning in a sea of violence. He dies in a car accident at the beginning of the book, but suspicions still live on about his connection to Seth.
- Stella Quinn--Stella was a pediatrician. A small woman with red hair and green eyes, Stella was a strong, shrewd woman who helped her husband run herd over the three Quinn boys who had come to her not through blood but through circumstance. She died of cancer seven years before the start of the novel.
