= Stuart Michael Thomas =

- Also known as: Stu Thomas
- Born: November 17, 1970 (age 55); Los Angeles, California, U.S.
- Origin: Los Angeles, California, U.S.
- Genres: Film scores
- Occupations: Composer, music producer
- Instruments: Guitar, bass, keyboards
- Years active: 2004–present
- Website: www.stuartmthomas.com

Stuart Michael Thomas (born November 17, 1970, in Los Angeles) is an American film composer, guitarist, and arranger for film and television. He has been a credited contributor to dozens of films including the Oscar nominated film Michael Clayton, Black Adam, The Dark Knight and Avengers: Age Of Ultron as well as TV films such as High Noon, Northern Lights, and Angels Fall. His primary collaborations have been with James Newton Howard, Lorne Balfe, and Brian Tyler. He is also briefly interviewed in Peter Jackson's King Kong Production Diaries.

He arranged and performed tracks for the film Gnomeo and Juliet, alongside Elton John’s band, which were performed at Abbey Road Studios.

== Filmography ==
2005

- King Kong (synth programming)

2006

- RV (additional music)

2007

- Michael Clayton (Oscar nominated score, additional music)
- The Great Debaters (Score Co-producer)
- Charlie Wilson's War (Score Co-producer)
- The Lookout (additional music)
- Blue Smoke (with Chris Bacon)
- Angels Fall (with Chris Bacon)

2008

- Eagle Eye (Additional Music)
- Bangkok Dangerous (Additional Music)
- Bustin' Down The Door
- Squeegees (Disney Web Series)
- Mad Money (additional music)

2009

- The Final Destination (arrangements)
- Fast & Furious (arrangements)
- Duplicity (arrangements)
- Confessions of a Shopaholic (additional music)
- High Noon (TV Film)
- Northern Lights (with Chris Bacon)
- Midnight Bayou (with Chris Bacon)
- Decisions, Decisions (Disney Web Series)

2010

- Love Ranch (additional music)
- Nanny McPhee & The Big Bang (additional music)
- Salt (arrangements, co-producer)
- The Last Airbender (arrangements, co-producer)
- Love & Other Drugs (song: Blue Pill)
- Alpha and Omega (song)
- Inhale (additional music)
- The Tourist (score co-producer)

2011

- Waking Wallbauer
- Commerce
- Water For Elephants (Score Producer)
- The Green Hornet (additional music)
- Larry Crowne (additional music)
- Green Lantern (soundtrack co-producer)
- Tandem (short)
- Chilly (short)

2012

- The Hunger Games
- Snow White & the Huntsman
- The Bourne Legacy

2013

- Iron Man 3 (additional music)
- Olympus Has Fallen (additional music)
- Fast & Furious 6 (additional music)
- Enemies Closer (additional music)
- Thor: The Dark World (additional music)

2014

- Teenage Mutant Ninja Turtles

2015

- Avengers: Age of Ultron (additional music)
- Paddy's In The Boot (short)

2016

- Now You See Me 2 (additional music)
- X-Men: Apocalypse (additional music)

2017

- Saban's Power Rangers (additional music)
- Fate of the Furious (additional music)
- MacGyver (2016) (additional music)

2018

- The Kid (short)
- Rosie Colored Glasses
- Brothers (short)

2019

- Lost In Space
- Shaft (additional music)

2020

- Pennyworth (arrangements)
- Bad Therapy (short)

2021

- Rumble (additional music)
- Perfect Companion (short)
- Sen (short)
- The Choice (short)

2022

- The Gilded Age (additional music/arrangements)
- Home Team (additional music/arrangements)
- Top Gun: Maverick (additional music/arrangements, guitar)
- Secret Headquarters (additional music/arrangements)
- Black Adam (additional music/arrangements)

2023

- Dungeons & Dragons: Honor Among Thieves (additional music)
- Mission Impossible: Dead Reckoning (additional music)

2024

- Argylle (additional music)
- Beverly Hills Cop: Axel F (arrangements, guitar)
- Bad Boys: Ride or Die (arrangements, guitar)
- The Cut (co-composed with Lorne Balfe)

2025

- Lockerbie: A Search For Truth (additional music)
- Novocaine (arrangements)
- The Old Guard 2 (additional music)
- Mission Impossible: The Final Reckoning (additional music/arrangements)
- Stuntnuts (additional music)
- M3gan 2.0 (additional music/arrengaments)
- Life On Our Planet (Season 2) (arrangements)

2026

- Per Aspera Ad Astra (co-composed with Kevin Riepl)
- Fault (Short Film - Tribeca 2026)
- Wishbone Fever (Short Film)
- Flow State (Short Film - Cannes Film Festival)
