= Lionsgate Television =

Television division of Lionsgate

- Type: Division
- Industry: Television
- Predecessor: Trimark Television; Starz Distribution eOne Television; Atlantis Communications; Alliance Atlantis; Salter Street Films
- Founded: 1997; 29 years ago
- Headquarters: 2700 Colorado Avenue, Santa Monica, California, U.S.
- Key people: Kevin Beggs (chair); Sandra Stern (president)
- Parent: Lionsgate (1997–2024); Lionsgate Studios (2024–present)
- Subsidiaries: Debmar–Mercury; Sea to Sky Entertainment (50%)
- Website: lionsgate.com

Lionsgate Television is the television division of the American production company Lionsgate Studios.

== History ==
The company was established in July 1997 as Lions Gate Television, Inc. with the establishment of Lionsgate Films. In June 1998, it acquired documentary/reality production company Termite Art Productions but that company was itself acquired by Erik Nelson in September 2004 and renamed Creative Differences.

The company acquired Mandalay Television in September 1997, before acquiring a minority investment in Mandalay Entertainment outright before splitting in 2002. Lionsgate sold off its shares in Mandalay Television in April 1999.

In March 1999, Lions Gate Television, Inc. became an incorporated entity. In January 2003, Lionsgate and New Line Television set up a partnership to provide twenty motion pictures designed for television.

On July 12, 2006, Lionsgate expanded into television syndication when the company acquired television distribution company Debmar–Mercury. Debmar–Mercury syndicated the film library before the acquisition.

20th Television handled advert sales to the series distributed by Debmar–Mercury with the exception of Meet the Browns, as the advert sales are handled by Disney–ABC Domestic Television with Turner Television Co. distributing the series.

On March 13, 2012, Lionsgate Television formed a new 50/50 joint venture, Sea to Sky Entertainment, with Thunderbird Films, the company founded by Lionsgate's founder and chairman, Frank Giustra. The chairman and chief creative officer (CCO) is currently Kevin Beggs and he is the longest tenured television studio chairman.

On October 27, 2026, Television executive Scott Herbst has been promoted to president of the Lionsgate Television Group. The announcement was made Oct. 27 by Kevin Beggs, Lionsgate Television Group chair and chief creative officer, with whom he has worked closely over the past several years in leadership roles and to whom he will continue to report.
