= Source Code (soundtrack) =

Source Code (Original Motion Picture Soundtrack)

Soundtrack album by Chris Bacon
- Released: March 29, 2011
- Recorded: 2011
- Studio: Sony Pictures Studios, Culver City, California; The Bridge Recording, Glendale, California
- Genre: Film score
- Length: 42:55
- Label: Lakeshore Records
- Producer: Chris Bacon

Chris Bacon chronology
Gnomeo & Juliet (2011)	Source Code (2011)	Beethoven's Christmas Adventure (2011)

Source Code (Original Motion Picture Soundtrack) is the soundtrack album to the 2011 film Source Code directed by Duncan Jones, starring Jake Gyllenhaal. The film score is composed by Chris Bacon and was released through Lakeshore Records on March 29, 2011.

== Development ==
In September 2010, it was reported that Clint Mansell would compose the score for Source Code in his second collaboration with Jones after Moon (2009). But, by that December, Jones stated that Mansell would no longer scoring the film due to time constraints. Chris Bacon, who earlier assisted James Newton Howard and had scored animated films such as Space Chimps (2008), Alpha and Omega (2010) and Gnomeo & Juliet (2011) with Howard. Source Code was Bacon's first for a live action science fiction film. Jones initially had a temp score in the edit which had an influence of Hitchcockian vibe. He played the piece to Bacon and discussed about the Hitchcock influences in the film and visual level and he wanted to bring through the temp score. Influenced by the piece, he composed the musical cue for the opening credits and remained intact with the temp piece he provided for Bacon. Jones liked his work and eventually recruited him for the film. The score was recorded at the Sony Scoring Stage located at the Sony Pictures Studios in Culver City, California and mixed at The Bridge Recording in Glendale, California.

== Track listing ==
No.	Title	Length
1.	"Source Code Main Titles"	02:24
2.	"You Don't Know Me"	03:03
3.	"Eight Minutes"	02:17
4.	"Racial Profiling"	02:11
5.	"Coffee Will Have To Wait"	02:13
6.	"Source Code Explained"	03:18
7.	"Piecing It Together"	03:25
8.	"Am I Dead?"	02:38
9.	"One Death Is Enough"	02:39
10.	"Colter Follows Derek"	05:26
11.	"A Real Validation"	01:38
12.	"I'm Gonna Save Her"	03:57
13.	"No More Rubble Today"	02:34
14.	"Regret And Reconciliation"	03:25
15.	"Frozen Moment"	04:23
16.	"Everything's Gonna Be Okay"	02:51
Total length:		48:22

== Reception ==
William Ruhlmann of AllMusic wrote "There is some calm, melodic material toward the end, but for the most part, the score for Source Code is functional and familiar, just the sort of thing a professional composer with little time and less sleep might have come up with under pressure." Alan Rogers of Maintitles wrote "Source Code is a frustrating listening experience. I am sure that it serves the film well, supporting the suspense and tension of the on-screen developments, but it only occasionally makes for an interesting listening experience apart from the film. However, the moments of the film that require Bacon to provide an emotional aspect is enough to suggest that he is a promising composer and one to watch for the future."

Chris Bumbray of JoBlo.com had noted "One of the things I most liked about SOURCE CODE was the superb, Jerry Goldsmith-Lalo Schifrin mid-seventies style score by Chris Bacon. Once again, this shows that Jones really appreciates a good score, with this being almost as good as the amazing score Clint Mansell (not Cliff Martinez- thanks to a sharp-eyed reader for pointed that out!) contributed to MOON." Peter Bradshaw of The Guardian noted that Bacon's score "[imitated] the jagged clamour of Bernard Herrmann". Kevin Panasiewicz of Collider wrote "Chris Bacon's orchestral score is old school (I already mentioned Hitchcock) and injects a sense of foreboding and urgency at key moments." Oliver Lyletton of IndieWire listed it as the best score of 2011, saying "For a movie where every moment counts in a different way, Bacon's score continually rises to the occasion".

== Personnel credits ==
Credits adapted from CD liner notes

- Music composer and producer – Chris Bacon
- Additional music – Gad Emile Zeitune
- Programming – Ryeland Allison
- Conductor and orchestrator – Pete Anthony
- Additional orchestration – John Ashton Thomas, Robert Litton
- Orchestra contractor – Peter Rotter, Sandy Decrescent
- Orchestra leader – Bruce Dukov
- Performers – Alan Estes, Alyssa Park, Amy Hershberger, Andrew Duckles, Andrew Shulman, Andy Malloy, Belinda Broughton, Bill Reichenbach, Bob Zimmitti, Brian Dembow, Chris Kollgaard, Dane Little, Daniel Kelley, Darrin McCann, Dave Everson, David Shostac, David Speltz, David Walther, Doug Tornquist, Elizabeth Johnson, Erika Duke, Kim Scholes, Geri Rotella, Giovanna Clayton, Helizabeth Hedman, Jim Thatcher, Jen Kuhn, Jessica Guideri, John Walz, Julie Gigante, Katia Popov, Katie Kirkpatrick, Kevin Connolly, Laura Brenes, Laura Pearson, Lisa Sutton, Malcolm McNab, Marc Sazer, Mark Adams, Matt Funes, Mike Nowak, Mike Valerio, Miwako Watanabe, Nico Philippon, Oscar Hidalgo, Pam Jacobson, Paula Hochhalter, Peter Limonick, Phil Levy, Randy Kerber, Rick Baptist, Robert Brophy, Roger Wilkie, Rose Corrigan, Sara Parkins, Sarah Thornblade, Searmi Park, Serena McKinney, Shawn Mann, Songa Lee, Steve Becknell, Steve Dress, Susan Ranney, Tami Hatwan, Tereza Stanislav, Tim Morrison, Timothy Loo, Bill Booth
- Digital score recordist – Erik Swanson
- Score recordist – Adam Michalak
- Recording and mixing – Shawn Murphy
- Music editor – Michael Brauer, Michael T. Ryan
- Music librarian – Mark Graham
- Copyist – Joann Kane Music Service
- Technician – Richard Grant
