= Sole Survivor (novel) =

1997 novel by Dean Koontz

- First US edition
- Author: Dean Koontz
- Cover artist: Chip Kidd
- Language: English
- Genre: Thriller, Mystery novel
- Publisher: Knopf (US); Headline (UK)
- Publication date: 1997
- Publication place: United States
- Media type: Print
- Pages: 321
- ISBN: 0-679-42526-8
- OCLC: 45033157

Sole Survivor is a novel by the best-selling author Dean Koontz, published in 1997. It centres around a man named Joe, who having lost his young family in a plane crash, is mysteriously approached by a woman who claims to have survived it. It was adapted into the 2000 film Sole Survivor.

== Plot summary ==
The novel centers around Joe Carpenter, a man who lost his wife and two daughters in a plane crash the year prior. Joe has never been able to fully cope with their deaths and, on the one-year anniversary, meets a strange woman named Rose claiming to be a survivor of the crash even when none were reported. Rose promises to tell Joe the truth but just not yet. Finally acknowledging that the story of the crash never fully made sense to him, Joe begins seeking answers as to what really happened on that night, discovering that some may be interested in stopping him even if it means taking his life.

There are a large number of suicides of family of the crash victims, which for a while convinces Joe that Rose is somehow getting them to kill themselves with a picture of a gravestone. This leads him to a development involving his dead daughter and a laboratory developed girl, CCY 21–21, with healing powers who looks like his daughter and who wants to live the life she was never able to. This girl can heal and give hope to anyone she touches. The only weakness is that she cannot heal herself if she is hurt.

Rose had been keeping this girl safe until her healing powers and full potential have matured, until Rose gets shot by agents who are attempting to kill her and the girl. Another experiment, SSW-89-58, has the power to telepathically see and know things through looking at pictures of places, as well as to control the minds of living beings in that area. The plane crash, as it turns out, was a plan to kill Rose because she had smuggled 21-21 out of the compound. 89-58 was forced to take over control of the pilot, in an attempt to kill everyone on the plane.

The plane crashed, but the girl and Rose escaped and were on the run. The novel ends with Joe escaping with Nina (CCY 21-21) and going underground. Rose was shot and dies in a final maelstrom.

== Characters ==
- Joe Carpenter - One of the main characters in this story. Both his children and his wife perished in a plane crash a year prior to the events that unfold. He is still haunted by the thoughts of his family, and has a small claustrophobia due to this.
- Rose - Another main character. She is the only one who knows the truth about the plane crash and Teknologik. She is the creator of CCY 21–21.
- CCY 21-21 - A girl grown at Teknologik with the powers of healing and hope.
- SSW 89-58 - A boy grown at Teknologik with the powers of "remoting" where, giving a picture, he can view the specific place or person and control it.
