= Sole Survivor (2000 film) =

- Based on: Sole Survivor by Dean Koontz
- Teleplay by: Richard Christian Matheson
- Directed by: Mikael Salomon
- Starring: Billy Zane; Gloria Reuben; Isabella Hofmann; Mitchell Kosterman; Rachel Victoria
- Music by: Mark Snow
- Country of origin: Canada
- Original language: English

Production
- Producers: Dean Koontz; Hans Proppe; Wendy Williams
- Cinematography: Jon Joffin
- Editor: Christopher Rouse
- Running time: 164 minutes
- Production companies: Columbia TriStar Television; Lions Gate Television; Mandalay Television

Original release
- Network: Fox Network
- Release: 13 September 2000

Sole Survivor, also known as Dean Koontz's Sole Survivor, is a Canadian science-fiction thriller TV movie adaptation of Dean Koontz's 1997 novel of the same name. The series was released in 2000 and was directed by Mikael Salomon.

== Plot ==
After the death of his wife and daughter in a plane crash, a newspaper reporter named Joe Carpenter discovers that the crash may have been related to a nefarious scientific experiment involving children. A woman, Rose Tucker, who claims that she was a survivor of the crash, approaches at his wife's grave.

The Quartermass organization wants to capture her and a young girl whom she is protecting. The girl has the power to heal and to transport. A villainous killer named Victor Yates and a young boy who can control minds from a distance lead the attack.

Tucker and Carpenter realize that Yates was once a CIA agent turned mercenary for the American government who was then hired to kill the scientists who were working on the projects at the Quartermass organization, genetically engineering children to become weapons for the next decade. He starts to kill witnesses who were investigating the crash that killed Joe's family, including members of the NTSB. Carpenter also realizes that his wife and daughter were the victims of an experiment gone wrong.

Donner, an agent for the bureau, comes to their aid after Joe needed someone to help him to cope with the loss of his family. After meeting Donner, who may never see his friend again, they seek refuge at the home of one of the witnesses, the Ealings, who have met Tucker after she survived the crash.

After meeting the Ealings, Carpenter tries to sneak inside the organization and save the children being held hostage. Joe and Tucker seek help from Tucker's associates to keep Yates off their trail, but ends up getting shot by one of Yates' men. Tucker dies of her injuries. Yates tells Carpenter that he didn't mean for anyone to get hurt during the plane crash and that he is not responsible for what had happened, telling Carpenter that his family was at the wrong place at the wrong time. Carpenter wants to kill him in revenge but needs his help to save the children.

Dewey, the psychic boy who destroyed the plane, kills Yates, as he now knows he would, forcing Yates to shoot himself and his fellow agent. Joe and the girl, whom he names Nina after his late daughter, are on the run and the boy dies. However, the girl shows a vision to Carpenter in which his wife and daughter say goodbye to him one last time and that they love him very much. Having finally found closure, Carpenter thanks her and both of them start a new life elsewhere.

== Differences between the novel and the film ==
In the novel, the Ealings help Tucker with her injuries by taking her to the hospital, while in the film she dies of her injuries.

In the novel, Yates is ambushed in the bathroom of the building by Carpenter, while in the film Yates is killed by Dewey, the boy with psychic powers.

== Cast ==
- Billy Zane as Joe Carpenter
- Gloria Reuben as Rose Tucker
- Isabella Hofmann as Barbara Christman
- Rachel Victoria as "21-21"
- Mitchell Kosterman as Becker
- Wally Dalton as Jeff Ealing
- Christine Willes as Mercy Ealing
- Glenn Morshower as Robert Donner
- John C. McGinley as Victor Yates
- Dan Joffre as Dewey
- Susan Bain as Clarise Vadance
- Patricia Idlette as Mahalia

== Awards ==
The film was nominated by the Academy of Science Fiction, Fantasy and Horror Films for a Saturn Award for Best Single Genre Television Presentation in 2001.
