= Carolina Moon (novel) =

2000 novel by Nora Roberts

- First edition (h/b)
- Author: Nora Roberts
- Language: English
- Genre: Romance, romantic suspense
- Publisher: Penguin Putnam Inc.
- Publication date: Hardcover - March 2000, Paperback - April 2001
- Publication place: United States
- ISBN: 978-0515130386

Carolina Moon is a 2000 romantic suspense novel by American author Nora Roberts. It is a standalone novel featuring Tory Bodeen as the heroine and Kincade Lavelle as her love interest. It was made into a TV movie for the Lifetime network in 2007.

== Plot summary ==
Tory Bodeen survived a difficult childhood thanks to her father's religious views with help from her special gift: another sense that can see events about to happen or happening. Her world is shattered when her best friend, Hope Lavelle, is murdered.

As an adult, Tory returns to Progress, South Carolina, to start her own business and to face her past. She runs into old friends, her cousin Wade, and Hope's family. Facing Hope's twin, Faith, is irritating—while seeing Cade Lavelle reignites an old flame.

When bodies start to pile up, Tory has to use her gift to try to locate a killer before it is too late. At the same time, her estranged father starts making unwelcome appearances at her shop and home.

== Film adaptation ==
See Carolina Moon for more information on the Lifetime version of the novel starring Claire Forlani as Tory Bodeen.
