= Irish Thoroughbred =

Novel by Nora Roberts

- Front cover by Silhouette Romance, #81
- Author: Nora Roberts
- Language: English
- Genre: Romance novel
- Published: January 1981 (Silhouette Books)
- Publication place: United States
- Media type: Mass Market Paperback
- Pages: 189
- Followed by: Search for Love

Irish Thoroughbred is American author Nora Roberts's debut novel, originally published by Silhouette in January 1981 as a category romance. Like other category romances, the novel was less than 200 pages and was intended to be on sale for only one month. It proved so popular that it was repackaged as a stand-alone romance and reprinted multiple times. Roberts wrote two sequels, Irish Rebel and Irish Rose.

Roberts drew on her Irish heritage to create an Irish heroine, Adelia "Dee" Cunnane. In the novel, Dee moves to the United States, where her sick uncle arranges for her to marry his employer, wealthy American horsebreeder Travis Grant. Although the early part of their relationship is marked by frequent arguments and misunderstanding, by the end of the story Travis and Dee reconcile. According to critic Mary Ellen Snodgrass, the couple's transformation from adversaries to a loving married couple is one of many formulaic elements in the book. Although the protagonists adhered to many stereotypes common to romance novels of the 1980s, Roberts's heroine is more independent and feisty than most heroines of the time. This book's popularity helped pave the way for other romance authors to experiment with heroes and heroines who had greater economic and emotional parity.

== Publication ==
In 1979, Nora Roberts was a stay-at-home mother with two small children. Stranded during a blizzard with nothing to read, Roberts amused herself by writing down one of the stories in her head. After developing her idea into a novel-length contemporary romance, she continued writing and soon finished six more manuscripts. Roberts submitted her work to Harlequin Enterprises, a Canadian company considered the foremost publisher of romance novels in North America. Harlequin typically published works by British authors set in the British Commonwealth, but in 1975 Harlequin relaxed its criteria slightly and purchased several novels from American Janet Dailey. Unconvinced that the market would appreciate novels such as Dailey's – all featuring American protagonists and set in the United States – Harlequin was unwilling to further expose itself to risk. As a result, the company quickly rejected Roberts's work; one editor explained that "they already had their American writer."

In an effort to take advantage of the untapped talent of American writers, in 1980 Simon & Schuster created a new imprint, Silhouette Books, to serve as a counterpart to Harlequin. Roberts sent her seventh manuscript, Irish Thoroughbred, unsolicited to the new company. Nancy Jackson, the acquiring editor at Silhouette, pulled the manuscript from the slush pile and was impressed. She offered Roberts a contract, leaving the writer "awestruck".

== Plot summary ==
The novel follows the relationship between Irishwoman Adelia "Dee" Cunnane and American Travis Grant. As the story begins, the young and penniless Dee emigrates to the United States to live with her uncle, Paddy, who works on a large horse farm. Dee's love for animals is evident, and she is given a job working alongside her uncle. Dee has a fiery temper and often argues with Travis, the wealthy farm owner; many of their arguments lead to passionate embraces. Travis later rescues Dee from an attempted rape.

When Paddy suffers a heart attack, he becomes very concerned about his mortality and Dee's future. He becomes overwrought and insists that Travis take care of Dee. After privately agreeing to a temporary marriage of convenience, Travis and Dee exchange vows in Paddy's hospital room. As the story progresses, the protagonists become increasingly unhappy, with neither willing to admit their love for the other.

Although still unwilling to vocalize their feelings, Dee and Travis appear more confident in their relationship after they finally consummate their marriage. Soon, however, Dee's insecurities are exploited by Travis's sophisticated former girlfriend, Margot, who has returned to the area to win him back. Dee runs away. Travis follows, and the two confess their love and resolve to make their marriage work.

== Genre ==
Irish Thoroughbred was initially published as a category romance novel. Books in this genre are short – usually between 175 and 200 pages, or about 55,000 words – and are published in clearly delineated lines, or categories. Although each category romance novel is unique, it is required to conform to the general parameters that define its line. The small number of books published in each line every month are numbered sequentially within the line. Irish Thoroughbred was number 81 in the Silhouette Romance line. Novels in this line espouse more traditional family values and place greater emphasis on the characters' emotions rather than their physical needs. Although these novels often describe sexual tension between the main characters, sexual intercourse is only described within the bounds of marriage.

Category romances are generally only available for a limited time, remaining on a bookseller's shelves until they are sold out or until the next month's titles are released. Popular category romances can be repacked as stand-alone romance novels; Irish Thoroughbred received five printings by 1984. In 2000, the book was paired with its sequel, Irish Rose, and republished as Irish Hearts, with an initial print run of one million copies. This coincided with the release of a second sequel, Irish Rebel, which focused on Travis and Dee's daughter.

== Themes ==
Silhouette editors were originally concerned that the novel was too ethnic. Like many of her early novels, Roberts's debut featured characters who shared the Irish culture in which Roberts had been raised. The opening pages, alluding to the introductory scene of Daphne du Maurier's Rebecca, detailed the heroine's awed reaction to the extravagance of an American estate. This plotline of an impoverished Irishwoman's surprise at the wealth of America essentially reframed the Irish emigration to the United States of the 19th century.

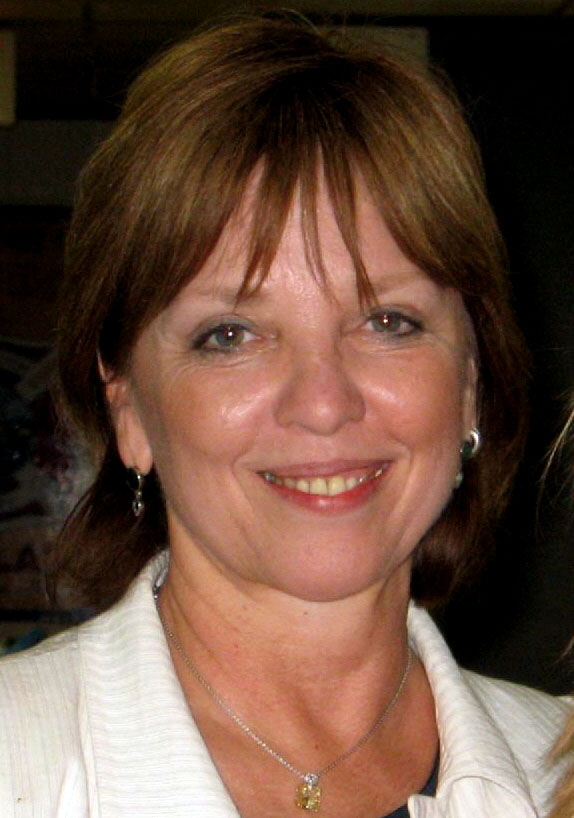
Author Nora Roberts

According to literary critic Mary Ellen Snodgrass, Irish Thoroughbred is not as polished as later Roberts works. Snodgrass cites many predictable elements, including the core "confrontation between an overconfident male and an assertive girl-woman". Throughout the 1970s and early 1980s, romance novel heroines were generally "trembling virgins", of an inferior class and power level than the hero. The hero often was very rich and powerful, while the heroine worked in traditional, subordinate, female roles, such as governess or secretary. The heroine of Irish Thoroughbred conformed to this pattern in part, by being sexually inexperienced, immature, and poor, but Roberts deliberately deviated from the rest of the stereotype by providing her with a hot-tempered and independent personality. Her later books have continued in the same vein. As Roberts explains, "My heroine may have problems, she may be vulnerable, but she has to be strong, she has to be intelligent. She has to be independent and so does he, or I'm not interested in telling their stories." The popularity of this book and Roberts's subsequent novels helped transform the genre, making authors more willing to give heroes and heroines economic and emotional parity.

Despite the greater independence that Roberts allotted her heroine, Dee is trapped within a patriarchal culture in which her uncle and prospective husband arrange her future. The arranged marriage and ensuing events, including the misunderstanding and her running away, were common plot elements for romance novels at that time. Dee's reactions, however, veered from the formulaic. Her retorts brought to mind the "quippy one-upmanship of feminist literature". When a man attempts to rape her, Dee responds with a series of sharp comments, calling him, among other things, "a filthy pig of a man", before succumbing to the traditional feminine response of fainting in horror.

Roberts also includes the motif of jealousy. Dee is given a rival for Travis's affections – an over-sophisticated woman who is essentially Dee's antithesis. Roberts reused this plot point in other novels, including Song of the West.

== Sources ==
- Bouricius, Ann (2000), The Romance Readers' Advisory: The Librarian's Guide to Love in the Stacks, American Library Association, ISBN 0-8389-0779-2
- Little, Denise; Hayden, Laura, eds. (2003), The Official Nora Roberts Companion, Berkley, ISBN 978-0-425-18344-1
- Regis, Pamela (2003), A Natural History of the Romance Novel, Philadelphia, PA: University of Pennsylvania Press, ISBN 0-8122-3303-4
- Snodgrass, Mary Ellen (2010), Reading Nora Roberts, Santa Barbara, CA: Greenwood Press, ISBN 978-0-313-36293-4
