= The Cut (2024 film) =

2024 film directed by Sean Ellis

- UK theatrical release poster
- Directed by: Sean Ellis
- Screenplay by: Justin Bull
- Story by: Mark Lane
- Produced by: Mark Lane; Leonora Darby; James Harris; Orlando Bloom; Adam Karasick; Bret Saxon; Thomas Fanning
- Starring: Orlando Bloom; Caitríona Balfe; John Turturro
- Cinematography: Sean Ellis
- Edited by: Mátyás Fekete
- Music by: Lorne Balfe; Stuart Michael Thomas
- Production companies: Tea Shop Productions; Amazing Owl
- Distributed by: Altitude Film Distribution (United Kingdom); Republic Pictures (United States)
- Release dates: 5 September 2024 (TIFF); 5 September 2025 (United States)
- Running time: 96 minutes
- Country: United States
- Language: English

The Cut is a 2024 psychological thriller film directed by Sean Ellis. It stars Orlando Bloom as an Irish boxer ending his retirement to seek a championship title, undergoing a drastic weight cutting regimen at the urging of his coach. The film premiered as a Special Presentation at the Toronto International Film Festival (TIFF) on 5 September 2024.

== Premise ==
Determined to win a championship title after coming out of retirement, an Irish fighter begins a grueling training and weight loss regimen under a demanding, unorthodox boxing coach.

== Cast ==
- Orlando Bloom as The Boxer / "The Wolf of Dublin"
- Caitríona Balfe as Caitlin Harney
- John Turturro as Boz
- Gary Beadle as Donny Hoff
- Clare Dunne as Mother
- Andonis Anthony as Paolo
- Mohammed Mansaray as Lupe
- Ed Kear as Manny
- Oliver Trevena as Jay

== Production ==
The screenplay for The Cut was written by Justin Bull from a story by Mark Lane. Deadline reported in early 2023 that principal photography was set to take place that summer in Nevada. In an interview with Collider, Bloom reported that he had lost 35 pounds for his starring role.

== Release ==
The Cut premiered as a Special Presentation at the TIFF on September 5, 2024. The film was released in the United States on September 5, 2025.

== Reception ==
On the review aggregator website Rotten Tomatoes, 67% of 46 critics' reviews are positive. Metacritic, which uses a weighted average, assigned the film a score of 51 out of 100, based on 14 critics, indicating "mixed or average" reviews.
