= Cupid (1998 TV series) =

- Created by: Rob Thomas
- Starring: Jeremy Piven; Paula Marshall; Jeffrey D. Sams
- Opening theme: "Human" by The Pretenders (cover of "Human on the Inside" by Divinyls)
- Country of origin: United States
- Original language: English
- No. of episodes: 15 (1 unaired)

Production
- Executive producers: Scott Winant; Joe Voci; Scott Sanders
- Producer: Jeremy Piven
- Production companies: Mandalay Television; Columbia TriStar Television

Original release
- Network: ABC
- Release: September 26, 1998 – February 11, 1999

Cupid is an American comedy-drama television series created by Rob Thomas that aired on ABC from September 26, 1998 to February 11, 1999 and which featured Paula Marshall as Dr. Claire Allen, a Chicago psychologist who is given charge of a man named Trevor Hale (Jeremy Piven). Hale believes he is Cupid, sent down from Mount Olympus by Zeus to connect 100 couples without using his powers, as a punishment for his arrogance.

Originally broadcast on ABC on Saturday evenings at 10 p.m. EST, the show lasted one season.

== Plot ==
Trevor Hale is attractive, witty, uncommonly intelligent—and he may be Cupid, the Greco-Roman god of erotic love. Probably not, but he thinks so. Trevor's insistence that he is Cupid lands him in a mental hospital, where he meets psychologist Claire Allen, a renowned authority on romance. Trevor tells Claire that he has been stripped of his godly powers by Zeus, and exiled from Mount Olympus as a punishment for arrogance. To win his way back among the gods, Trevor must unite 100 couples in everlasting love, without his bow and arrows. Claire does not believe in Cupid, but she risks her career by releasing Trevor from the hospital, assuming responsibility for his behavior. Trevor finds work as a bartender, and regularly disrupts Claire's group therapy sessions. All the while, he plots his campaign to promote romance, and earn his way back to Olympus. While encouraging sexual abandon in others, Trevor remains chaste; he believes sex with a mortal will confine him to Earth forever.

== Cast ==
=== Main ===
- Jeremy Piven as Cupid / Trevor Hale
- Paula Marshall as Dr. Claire Allen
- Jeffrey D. Sams as Champ Terrace

=== Recurring ===
- Paul Adelstein as Mike
- Noelle Bou-Sliman as Tina
- Daniel Bryant as Laurence
- Melanie Deanne Moore as Jaclyn
- Jeffrey Vincent Parise as Nick
- Geryll Robinson as Chris

=== Notable guest stars ===
- Joe Flanigan as Alex
- Hollis Resnik as Linda
- Tim DeKay
- Connie Britton as Madeleine
- Laura Leighton
- Lisa Loeb
- Tiffani Thiessen

== Episodes ==
Fifteen episodes were produced, and fourteen episodes were aired. Two additional episodes titled "Company Pier" and "Chapter Six" were scripted, but were never filmed.

List of Cupid episodes
No.	Title	Directed by	Written by	Original release date	Prod. code
1	"Pilot"	Scott Winant	Rob Thomas	September 26, 1998	100
Psychologist Dr. Claire Allen is called in by the hospital to look at a man who believes he is the Greek god Cupid. After weeks of therapy and Claire's insistence that he has overcome his delusions he is released into her custody at a council hearing where the man also claims his real name is Trevor Hale (which Claire later discovers is a name he made up on the fly from a sign in the courtroom 'And love shall make the Earth tremor, as it's reborn in a storm of fire and hail.'). Cupid/Trevor begins going to a singles meeting that Claire heads, and in doing so helps a woman from the seminar find love, to Claire's consternation. Trevor also charms his way into securing a job as a bartender at Taggerty's and convinces the bouncer, Champ, into renting him a room.
2	"The Linguist"	Scott Winant	Rob Thomas	October 3, 1998	101
Dr. Claire Allen enlists the help of a University of Chicago linguist to determine Trevor's real past. Trevor helps him find love through tutoring a woman that works at the university's cafeteria. The linguist builds a file on Trevor, but when the relationship blossoms, he hides the file from Claire.
3	"Heaven, He’s in Heaven"	Michael Engler	Jeff Reno & Ron Osborn	October 10, 1998	102
A couple seek counseling from Claire because the husband keeps spontaneously breaking into song and dance in public. Claire loses a promotion by criticizing the husband, but Trevor brings them together by teaching the wife to dance.
4	"A Truly Fractured Fairy Tale"	Elodie Keene	Elle Triedman	October 17, 1998	103
A woman in Claire's group dreams of a male model on a billboard, and Trevor introduces them. The relationship goes well initially, but they end up apart because he is a city boy and she is a country girl. Meanwhile, Claire's faith in romance is restored by anonymous gifts, but it turns out they were intended for a different woman.
5	"First Loves"	Patrick Norris	Hart Hanson	October 24, 1998	104
Champ's friend Sophie (Lisa Loeb) has not been in love since she was 13. Trevor and the group go on a road trip to find her childhood sweetheart, but she finds love with her sweetheart's younger brother. Meanwhile, Trevor is upset because he thinks Claire is going to chemically castrate him, but she actually prevents the procedure.
6	"Meat Market"	Michael Fields	Rob Thomas	October 31, 1998	105
Trevor teaches the men from Claire's singles group how to meet women at a night club's Halloween bash. He helps them get over their fear of rejection by inventing a game where the winner is the one who collects the most rejections. Also, Trevor helps a homeless girl go back to her hometown.
7	"Pick-Up Schticks"	Tucker Gates	Michael Conathan & Rob Thomas	November 7, 1998	106
Trevor is attracted to Helen (Sherilyn Fenn), but cannot have sex with her because he believes it will make him mortal forever. Meanwhile, Claire's relationship with Alex, a Pulitzer winning writer, becomes serious. Also, a man in Claire's single group uses unethical pick up lines to have sex with a woman he admires, then feels ashamed.
8	"Heart of the Matter"	Michael Engler	Karen Hall	November 21, 1998	107
Trevor sets up a dying woman with a hockey coach. They hit it off, but before they can have a second date, he is killed in an auto crash. Trevor becomes despondent, but then the coach's organs save the woman's life.
9	"The End of an Eros"	Peter O'Fallon	Michael Green	December 12, 1998	108
Claire believes Alex is going to break up with her, so she asks Trevor's assistance. Trevor helps, but it is shown that he may have feelings for Claire himself.
10	"Hung Jury"	David Petrarca	Teleplay by : Michael Green & Michael Conathan; Story by : Hart Hanson & Rob Thomas	December 19, 1998	110
Claire and Trevor are forced to serve on a jury during Christmas. Claire frets about not spending the holiday with Alex, while Trevor tries to help two black jurors connect. In the end, the female black juror takes a liking to a white juror.
11	"A Great Personality"	Deran Sarafian	Rob Thomas	January 7, 1999	112
Trevor explains to the group that beautiful people end up in relationships with other beautiful people. Claire disagrees, and they set up a beautiful woman in the group with an ordinary looking man with a good personality. In the end, the beautiful woman goes back to her good looking ex-boyfriend, proving Trevor right.
12	"Grand Delusions"	Nick Marck	Sy Dukane & Denise Moss	January 14, 1999	111
A man who believes he is Don Quixote walks into Trevor's bar and thinks Trevor is his Sancho Panza. Trevor helps him woo Dulcinea (in reality a stripper). In the end, Claire makes the man realize he is crazy as the result of killing his wife in a drunk driving crash. Also, Claire's jazz-playing father visits.
13	"Bachelorette Party"	Stephen Cragg	Dahlia Borthwick	January 28, 1999	109
Claire's friend is in town for her wedding and bachelorette party. Trevor attempts to head off a woman the groom has been sleeping with, but it turns out that she and the groom are really the ones in love. Claire is forced to confront her and her friends cliquish behaviour. They had treated the woman poorly.
14	"The Children’s Hour"	Michael Katleman	Hart Hanson	February 11, 1999	113
Claire is treating a young boy when the boy enlists Trevor's help in finding his mom (Tiffani Thiessen) a boyfriend. She thinks poorly of men because they cannot accept that she has children, then turns down a suitor because he has to take care of an ailing aunt. In the end they show her her own double standard, and the two become a couple.
15	"Botched Makeover"	James Whitmore Jr.	Vanessa Taylor & Rob Thomas	Unaired	114
A woman in Claire's group can't get a date because of her appearance. Trevor suggests a make-over, and she becomes a beauty. A man goes out with her on a bet, thinking she is unattractive, then grows to like the new her. She learns of the bet and rejects him. Meanwhile, Trevor and Claire spar over who is the better dancer, then join to win a dance contest when each's partner is unavailable.

== Production ==
In an Entertainment Weekly article from December 2004, creator Rob Thomas mentions that the show would have ended with Trevor and Claire becoming Trevor's 100th match—and without revealing whether Trevor really was Cupid.

=== Staff ===
- Rob Thomas – Creator, executive producer, supervising producer
- Scott Winant – Executive producer, director
- Joe Voci – Executive producer
- Scott Sanders – Executive producer
- Jeff Reno – Executive producer
- Ron Osborn – Executive producer
- Hart Hanson – Co-Executive Producer
- W.G. "Snuffy" Walden – Composer

== Reception ==
E! Online named Cupid as #4 on its "Top Ten Shows Cancelled Before Their Time".

== Show revival ==
ABC and Rob Thomas brought Cupid back to the airwaves with an October 2007 deal for which scripts and production were approved in March 2008. The series was relocated to New York City and cast Bobby Cannavale as Trevor and Sarah Paulson as Claire. Only seven episodes of the revival series aired, from March 31 – June 16, 2009.
