= Tribute (2009 film) =

- Promotional poster
- Based on: Tribute by Nora Roberts
- Screenplay by: Gary Tieche
- Directed by: Martha Coolidge
- Starring: Brittany Murphy; Jason Lewis
- Theme music composer: Martin Davich
- Country of origin: United States
- Original language: English

Production
- Producer: David Zelon
- Cinematography: Johnny E. Jensen
- Editor: Elba Sanchez-Short
- Production company: Mandalay TV

Original release
- Network: Lifetime
- Release: April 11, 2009

Tribute, also known as Nora Roberts' Tribute, is a 2009 television film directed by Martha Coolidge starring Brittany Murphy and Jason Lewis. The film is based on the 2008 Nora Roberts novel of the same name. It is part of the Nora Roberts 2009 movie collection, which also includes Northern Lights, Midnight Bayou, and High Noon. The movie debuted April 11, 2009 on Lifetime.

== Plot ==
Former child star Cilla McGowan has found more satisfying work restoring old houses. In search of a normal life, Cilla buys her grandmother's farmhouse in Virginia's Shenandoah Valley to rescue it from ruin.

Cilla's hope for serenity is soon eclipsed by haunting dreams of her famous grandmother, who died of a supposed overdose in the house, more than 30 years before. Cilla soon begins a romantic relationship with Ford Sawyer, her handsome neighbor, who ultimately comforts and protects her when her dark dreams and family secrets turn into a real-life nightmare.

== Cast ==
- Brittany Murphy as Cilla McGowan
- Jason Lewis as Ford Sawyer
- Christian Oliver as Steve Chensky
- Diana Scarwid as Cathy Morrow
- Tippi Hedren as Mrs. Hennessey
- Tiffany Morgan as Janet
- Griff Furst as Brian Morrow
- Mark Wilson as Alvin Wilson
- Blake Nelson Boyd as Piano Player

== Production ==
The film was executive produced by Stephanie Germain and Peter Guber, who also executive produced seven other Roberts films for Lifetime in 2007 and 2009.

== Reception ==
The Movie Scene said the film "is sadly not as good as I hoped and suffers because certain elements of the storyline have been too embellished whilst others have been under explored. It is entertaining but almost in that it borders on the cheesily amusing rather than for being a tight and exciting thriller."
