= Oh Baby (TV series) =

American sitcom

- Genre: Sitcom
- Created by: Susan Beavers
- Starring: Cynthia Stevenson; Joanna Gleason; Jessica Walter; Matt Champagne; Doug Ballard; Jack Coleman; Patrick Kerr; Don McManus; Dina Spybey
- Composer: Jimmy Beavers
- Country of origin: United States
- Original language: English
- No. of seasons: 2
- No. of episodes: 44

Production
- Executive producer: Susan Beavers
- Running time: 30 minutes
- Production companies: 5 a.m., Inc.; Mandalay Television; Columbia TriStar Television Distribution

Original release
- Network: Lifetime
- Release: August 26, 1998 – March 4, 2000

Oh Baby is an American sitcom series that ran on Lifetime from August 26, 1998, to March 4, 2000. The series was produced by Mandalay Television for Columbia TriStar Television.

Oh Baby was based on the real-life experience of the show's executive producer Susan Beavers. The show's theme song was performed by Jimmy Beavers, Susan's brother.

GetTV announced at 6:30 PM on September 12, 2021, that Oh Baby will enter reruns and would air on Mondays to Fridays starting November 1, 2021.

== Plot ==
The series follows Tracy Calloway, a single working woman who decides to have a child through artificial insemination, a decision that was spurred by an increase in working mothers at her workplace. Using a fourth wall technique, she tells the audience watching about the joy and sorrows of being a single mother while showing videos of her and her family and friends in her life.

As Tracy successfully goes through with the process, she eventually finds support in Dr. Charlotte St. John, her best friend—who also works at Tracy's company as a psychiatrist and can dole out advice on how to be a single mother (she was twice divorced and had two children with different fathers)—and in her brother Ernie, an aspiring painter who wants out of his marriage and to move to Europe.

The only person who initially has mixed feelings about Tracy's decision was her mother, Celia. At first, Celia thinks that Tracy has made the biggest mistake of her life by going through with the procedure, but eventually Celia comes to accept it. Despite that, Tracy knows her mother's reputation for trying to control her and Ernie's life, which indeed did play out through her pregnancy, with hilarious results.

Tracy's pregnancy also involves other situations which meet with hilarious results such as constant and uncontrollable water bursts and learning to breastfeed, including an incident when her lactating breast is accidentally exposed at a restaurant. Tracy also plays matchmaker for Charlotte, by hooking her up with her gynecologist Dr. Doug Bryan, leading to an on-again-off-again romance between the two.

By the end of the first season, Tracy gives birth to a son (a viewers' contest sponsored by Lifetime allowed fans to pick the baby's name). In August 1999, "Daniel" was the choice picked by viewers.

During the second season, Tracy finds herself trying to balance a life as a working mother as well as bearing Celia's constant interference, with disastrous results. That friction eventually also costs Tracy her job. As soon as she is let go, her fellow co-workers snatch everything from her cubicle.

Following that event, she and Charlotte decide to go into business for themselves by launching an online retail business called TrustMom.com whose logo is a picture of Celia, despite Tracy's objections.

== Episodes ==
=== Series overview ===
| Season | Episodes | Originally released | |
| Season | Episodes | First released | Last released |
|---|---|---|---|
| 1 | 22 | August 18, 1998 | March 13, 1999 |
| 2 | 22 | August 21, 1999 | March 11, 2000 |

=== Season 1 (1998–1999) ===
| No. overall | No. in season | Title | Directed by | Written by | Original release date |
|---|---|---|---|---|---|
| 1 | 1 | "Pilot" | Robert Berlinger | Susan Beavers | August 18, 1998 |
After having broken up with commitment-phobia boyfriend, 30-year-old single office worker Tracy decides to do something radical... have a child by artificial immsermination.
| 2 | 2 | "Picking a Donor" | Robert Berlinger | Susan Beavers; Bob Stevens | August 25, 1998 |
Tracy pays a visit to the sperm donor bank to cash in on finding the right father for the unborn child but might want to deposit a little more info on the suitable client she's looking for.
| 3 | 3 | "Becoming Your Mom" | Unknown | Unknown | September 1, 1998 |
Tracy hopes to break the cycle of how Celia treats her by imagining what it would be like years later with her child.
| 4 | 4 | "Logistics" | Unknown | Unknown | September 8, 1998 |
Tracy's working schedule and how she will balance it with being a mother comes into play as she learns that Ernie's maid has quit, Charlotte's experiences of raising two kids after her divorce and Celia not being impressed with Tracy's way of handling things.
| 5 | 5 | "Taking a Vacation" | Unknown | Unknown | September 15, 1998 |
Tracy learns that the upcoming business trip to Mexico costs more than her impregnation, so when she tells Charlotte, the situation ends up taking a trip of its own.
| 6 | 6 | "Timing" | Unknown | Unknown | September 29, 1998 |
Tracy scrambles to meet her impregnation deadline, but the timing seems to throw things off for her.
| 7 | 7 | "Pregnancy and Dating" | Unknown | Unknown | October 6, 1998 |
After Tracy meets a fellow co-worker who she likes very much, she must debate over whether to tell him about her pregnancy. But it's about to get more complicated when Charlotte and Celia follow the two on their movie date.
| 8 | 8 | "Telling the Office" | Unknown | Unknown | October 13, 1998 |
When Tracy's secret pregnancy is exposed at work after she uses her boss' bathroom during morning sickness, she has to find a way to actually explain how she got pregnant to her co-workers... and to her boss, after he claims to be the unborn baby's father!
| 9 | 9 | "Show and Tell" | Unknown | Unknown | October 20, 1998 |
Rick rekindles his relationship with Tracy... Until Tracy learns that didn't tell his co-workers about her pregnancy.
| 10 | 10 | "The Hut" | Unknown | Unknown | October 27, 1998 |
When her boss hires an assistant for Tracy so she can slow down her work routine, Charlotte warns Tracy that she might take her job now that Tracy is pregnant, which brings back memories of how Tracy got her job in the first place and Tracy suggesting a "mommie room" for working mothers. And on top of that, her assistant also has a surprise for Tracy too.
| 11 | 11 | "Friends and Doctors" | Unknown | Unknown | November 3, 1998 |
After Tracy sees Charlotte and Dr. Bryant together at a restaurant, Tracy tries to keep the two from being a couple out of fear of losing the friendly relationship she has with both of them.
| 12 | 12 | "Anniversary" | Unknown | Unknown | December 1, 1998 |
Tracy is the only one doing the planning for her parents' anniversary party, which gives her another reason why she hopes to raise her child the right way.
| 13 | 13 | "Losing Your Nerve" | Unknown | Unknown | December 8, 1998 |
Thanks to Ernie having lost her buffer, Tracy must find a way to afford baby stuff, prompting Celia to pair her up with a pet groomer she dated in the past. But when he offers to help raise Tracy's child, Charlotte steps in to prevent this unlikely matchup.
| 14 | 14 | "False Alarm" | Unknown | Unknown | December 15, 1998 |
Tracy tries to find a way to deal with the sudden uncontrollable moods within her pregnancy.
| 15 | 15 | "Lamaze" | Unknown | Unknown | January 9, 1999 |
Tracy is forced to fire Celia after she becomes too much to handle as a Lamaze coach.
| 16 | 16 | "Dreams" | Unknown | Unknown | January 16, 1999 |
Tracy is offered a chance to start a company with two fellow workers, but she's not so sure if she wants to take the risk.
| 17 | 17 | "Daughter's Day" | Unknown | Unknown | January 23, 1999 |
Tracy gets some unlikely parenting advice from Charlotte's troubled daughter.
| 18 | 18 | "Baby Shower" | Unknown | Unknown | January 30, 1999 |
Tracy picks a party planner over Charlotte and Celia to do her baby shower.
| 19 | 19 | "Romeos and Juliets" | Unknown | Unknown | February 13, 1999 |
Tracy's mommy skills are put to the test when she is asked by Charlotte to take care of her daughters and Doug's son while they are on vacation... only to have Doug's son and Charlotte's eldest daughter fall for each other.
| 20 | 20 | "Discrimination" | Unknown | Unknown | February 20, 1999 |
When Tracy receives a notice that she is being evicted because of a single-occupancy clause, Tracy believes that her landlord is evicting her because of her pregnancy.
| 21 | 21 | "Birth: Part 1" | Unknown | Unknown | March 6, 1999 |
Anxiety awaits Tracy as her baby is due, while her ex returns, anxious to restart their relationship again.
| 22 | 22 | "Birth: Part 2" | Unknown | Unknown | March 13, 1999 |
As a strike looms over the hospital, Tracy is worried if her nurse will join the picket line; Celia and Charlotte are at odds over who should comfort Tracy in the delivery room.

=== Season 2 (1999–2000) ===
| No. overall | No. in season | Title | Directed by | Written by | Original release date |
|---|---|---|---|---|---|
| 23 | 1 | "Sitting on Babies" | Unknown | Unknown | August 21, 1999 |
Tracy, now a mother, must search for a babysitter, even as she can't get her mind off the newborn Danny during an evening out.
| 24 | 2 | "Social Pressures" | Unknown | Unknown | August 28, 1999 |
Tracy tackles the one ritual all newborn mothers face in their lives once they have children... Breast feeding Danny.
| 25 | 3 | "The Colonel" | Unknown | Unknown | September 4, 1999 |
Tracy and Rick are stunned as to how fast-paced the relationship between Ceila and Rick's father has gotten. Meanwhile, Charlotte is getting cold feet as her wedding day to Doug approaches.
| 26 | 4 | "Balance" | Unknown | Unknown | September 11, 1999 |
Tracy is learning that her first day back from maternity leave is not all smooth sailing, and it could alter her priorities and her relationship with Rick.
| 27 | 5 | "Goodbye Again" | Unknown | Unknown | September 18, 1999 |
As Rick tries to become more involved in Danny's life, Tracy is starting wonder if their relationship will have a future.
| 28 | 6 | "Corruption" | Unknown | Unknown | September 25, 1999 |
Tracy competes with another mother for a spot at a prestigious school.
| 29 | 7 | "Rebound" | Unknown | Unknown | October 9, 1999 |
Tracy dates a single dad, but after they stop bringing their kids on dates, she decides to break up with him. When she starts thinking about Rick again, her hopes are dashed when she learns her ex is dating someone new. Meanwhile, Charlotte has an affair with a younger man, a millionaire who's rumored to become the owner of Tracy's company.
| 30 | 8 | "Convention" | Unknown | Unknown | October 9, 1999 |
Tracy ends up taking Danny and Celia with her to Hawaii, where business and pleasure doesn't mix with the ohana (her family, that is). Meanwhile, Charlotte is detoured to a South American country and is detained.
| 31 | 9 | "Father Figure" | Unknown | Unknown | October 23, 1999 |
Celia, believing that Danny needs a father figure in his life, sets a guy up with Tracy, who doesn't want to match up with him. Meanwhile, Charlotte and Doug decide to give their relationship another try.
| 32 | 10 | "Family History" | Unknown | Unknown | November 27, 1999 |
It's a Thanksgiving that Tracy would like to forget as she prepares a perfect dinner that goes awry while dealing with her parents' bickering.
| 33 | 11 | "Confidence" | Unknown | Unknown | December 4, 1999 |
Tracy learns that the children of the executives at the day-care center that Danny attends are getting better treatment than Danny.
| 34 | 12 | "Guilty" | Unknown | Unknown | December 11, 1999 |
Tracy hires a nanny for Danny, who quickly bonds with her, making Tracy feeling left out.
| 35 | 13 | "Friendship" | Unknown | Unknown | December 18, 1999 |
Tracy runs into Rick's new girlfriend... and it becomes a constant theme between the two every time they meet.
| 36 | 14 | "Management" | Unknown | Unknown | January 8, 2000 |
Tracy clashes with the new assistant, who is very arrogant and well like by the company boss because he wants to keep her on the job.
| 37 | 15 | "Cinderella" | Unknown | Unknown | January 15, 2000 |
Tracy is given the "Cinderella" treatment by Charlotte by offering her a night out, stress-free bliss at a luxury hotel. But Tracy starts to feel like midnight's approaching when she worries about leaving Danny alone.
| 38 | 16 | "Priorities" | Unknown | Unknown | January 22, 2000 |
When Tracy learns of a proposal at Danny's school to ban violent video games, she also finds out that her company also produces the stuff too.
| 39 | 17 | "TrustMom.com" | Unknown | Unknown | January 29, 2000 |
After questioning the unethical practices at her company, Tracy ponders her future and if she should quit and start a business of her own. Meanwhile, Charlotte's ex-husband has resurfaced into her life again.
| 40 | 18 | "Friendship" | Unknown | Unknown | February 12, 2000 |
Charlotte has to explain to Doug about the kiss she gave to her ex-husband; Tracy receives a call from "Mr. Right."
| 41 | 19 | "What It Should Be and What It Is" | Unknown | Unknown | February 19, 2000 |
Tracy and Charlotte are discovering that there is a lot more into planning a business than they imagined.
| 42 | 20 | "Launch" | Unknown | Unknown | February 26, 2000 |
As TrustMom.com prepares for its launch, Tracy is forgetting another important event: Danny's first birthday.
| 43 | 21 | "Image" | Unknown | Unknown | March 4, 2000 |
When TrustMom.com runs out of money, Tracy seeks financial backing from a couple who owns a baby-food company.
| 44 | 22 | "Dot.Coms Are Human, Too" | Unknown | Unknown | March 11, 2000 |
Tracy must deal with a pair of crisis: That of Rick getting married and a botched up order at TrustMom.com.

== Cast ==
- Cynthia Stevenson (Tracy Calloway)
- Joanna Gleason (Charlotte St. John)
- Jessica Walter (Celia Calloway)
- Patrick Kerr (Brad)
- Jack Coleman (Rick)
- Matt Champagne (Ernie Calloway)
- Ken Jenkins (Fred Calloway)
- Tom Gallop (Jeff)
- Justina Machado (Mona)

- Julie Neumark (Teenage Tracy)
- Lynnanne Zager (Newscaster)
- Alison Martin (Nora)
- Miles Grose (Customer Service Agent)
- Mimi Rose (Frances)
- Chad Everett (The Colonel)
- Marley McClean (Molly)
- Colin Spensor (Bradley)
- Florence Stanley (Beverly)

- Jeff Yagher (Noah)
- Julie Bowen (Nikky)
- Greg Evigan (Billy)
- Eric Szmanda (Brent)
- Steve Wilder (Vince)
- Doug Ballard (Dr. Doug Bryan)
- Don McManus (Don Lewis)
- Cheyenne Haynes (Sara)
