= Carolina Moon (2007 film) =

- DVD cover
- Genre: Drama; Thriller
- Based on: Carolina Moon by Nora Roberts
- Screenplay by: Stephen Tolkin
- Directed by: Stephen Tolkin
- Starring: Claire Forlani; Oliver Hudson
- Theme music composer: Steve Porcaro
- Country of origin: United States
- Original language: English

Production
- Producers: Stephanie Germaine; Peter Guber; Peter E. Strauss
- Cinematography: Derick Underschultz
- Editor: Gib Jaffe
- Running time: 95 minutes
- Production company: Mandalay TV

Original release
- Network: Lifetime
- Release: February 19, 2007

Carolina Moon is a 2007 American television film directed by Stephen Tolkin and starring Claire Forlani and Oliver Hudson. Based on the 2000 Nora Roberts novel Carolina Moon, the film is about a woman with psychic visions who returns to her hometown to exorcise her demons and finds both danger and love. Carolina Moon is part of the Nora Roberts 2007 movie collection, which also includes Angels Fall, Blue Smoke, and Montana Sky. The movie debuted February 19, 2007 on Lifetime Television.

== Plot ==
Young Tory Bodeen (Forlani) is blessed - or maybe cursed - with clairvoyance. Her childhood best friend, Hope, is murdered and she leaves town. Years later she returns to open a retail store. Tory's father, an abusive religious fanatic and ex-con remains the prime suspect in the unsolved murder. Her mother is a weak enabler, believing her husband is a good man, and that Tory is evil due to her paranormal abilities.

As the anniversary of Hope's death approaches, Tory resolves to face her demons, with the help of her childhood friends—Tory's cousin Wade (Willett), Hope's twin sister Faith (Davis), and the twins' older brother Cade (Hudson), who realizes his childhood crush on Tory hasn't ended. Will her friends be enough to save Tory?

== Cast ==
- Claire Forlani as Victoria "Tory" Bodeen
- Oliver Hudson as Cade Lavelle
- Josie Davis as Faith Lavelle
- Jonathan Scarfe as Dwight Collier
- Chad Willett as Wade Mooney
- Jacqueline Bisset as Margaret Lavelle
- Shaun Johnston as Han Bodeen
- Greg Lawson as Police Chief Carl Russ
- Gabrielle Casha as Young Tory Bodeen
- Kade Phillips as Young Cade Lavelle
- Shae Keebler as Young Faith Lavelle / Hope Lavalle
- Taison Gelinas as Young Dwight Collier
- Connor Robinson as Young Wade Mooney

== Production ==
The film was executive produced by Stephanie Germain and Peter Guber, who also 'e.p.-ed' seven other Roberts films for Lifetime in 2007 and 2009.
