= Mandalay Baseball LLC =

Mandalay Baseball LLC is a subsidiary of Mandalay Entertainment Group. MSE previously owned a number of minor-league baseball teams, via its former Mandalay Baseball subsidiary, and was responsible for managing others.

== Teams previously owned ==
- Lake Elsinore Storm (1996–2001), California Angels / San Diego Padres affiliate in the Class A California League
- Las Vegas Stars / Las Vegas 51s (1996–2008), San Diego Padres / Los Angeles Dodgers affiliate in the Class AAA Pacific Coast League
- Hagerstown Suns (2002–2010), Washington Nationals affiliate in the Class A South Atlantic League, sold for $6.7 million to purchase Oklahoma City Redhawks
- Staten Island Yankees (2006–2012), New York Yankees affiliate in the Short Season New York–Penn League, sold for $8.3 million.
- Dayton Dragons (2000–2014), Cincinnati Reds affiliate in the Class A Midwest League, sold for $40 million.
- Frisco RoughRiders (2003–2014), Texas Rangers affiliate in the Class AA Texas League, valued at $28 million.
- Oklahoma City RedHawks (2010–2014), Houston Astros affiliate in the Class AAA Pacific Coast League, valued at $21 million
- Erie SeaWolves (2003–2015), Detroit Tigers affiliate in the Class AA Eastern League.

== Teams previously managed ==
- Winston-Salem Dash (2009–2010), Chicago White Sox affiliate in the Class A Carolina League
- Scranton/Wilkes-Barre RailRiders, (2006–2014), New York Yankees affiliate in the Class AAA International League, sold for $13–$15 million.
