= Bad As I Wanna Be: The Dennis Rodman Story =

- Genre: Biography; Drama; Sport
- Based on: Bad As I Wanna Be by: Dennis Rodman; Tim Keown
- Written by: John Miglis; Gar Anthony Haywood
- Directed by: Jean de Segonzac
- Starring: Dwayne Adway; John Terry; Dee Wallace; Heidi Mark; Daniel Hugh Kelly; Art Hindle; Karen Robinson; Michael Caloz
- Composer: Christopher Tyng
- Country of origin: United States
- Original language: English

Production
- Executive producer: Tom Patricia
- Producer: John Perrin Flynn
- Production location: Toronto
- Cinematography: Michael Fash
- Editor: Ron Wisman
- Running time: 120 minutes
- Production companies: Mandalay Television; Columbia TriStar Television

Original release
- Network: ABC
- Release: February 8, 1998

Bad As I Wanna Be: The Dennis Rodman Story is a 1998 American drama film directed by Jean de Segonzac and written by John Miglis and Gar Anthony Haywood. It is based on the 1996 book Bad As I Wanna Be by Dennis Rodman and Tim Keown. The film stars Dwayne Adway, John Terry, Dee Wallace, Heidi Mark, Daniel Hugh Kelly, Art Hindle, Karen Robinson and Michael Caloz. The film premiered on ABC on February 8, 1998.

== Plot ==
The Biographical story of basketball player Dennis Rodman (Dwayne Adway) where he is pushed by his mother to attend college where he would get an opportunity to turn pro. He is shipped to Oklahoma to play for Southeastern under coach Lonn Reisman (Daniel Hugh Kelly) after leading Southeastern to several wins (where he is named the All American Player of the year) he is drafted by Coach Chuck Daly (Art Hindle) of the NBA team the Detroit Pistons.

== Cast ==
- Dwayne Adway as Dennis Rodman
- John Terry as James Rich
- Dee Wallace as Pat Rich
- Heidi Mark as Annie Rodman
- Daniel Hugh Kelly as Lonn Reisman
- Art Hindle as Chuck Daly
- Karen Robinson as Shirley Rodman
- Michael Caloz as Bryne Rich
- Terumi Matthews as Madonna
- Dennis Rodman as Himself
