= Northern Lights (2009 film) =

- Promotional poster
- Based on: Northern Lights by Nora Roberts
- Screenplay by: Janet Brownell
- Directed by: Mike Robe
- Starring: LeAnn Rimes; Eddie Cibrian
- Music by: Stuart Michael Thomas; Chris Bacon
- Country of origin: United States
- Original language: English

Production
- Producer: Randi Richmond
- Cinematography: Craig Wrobleski
- Editor: Sabrina Plisco
- Production company: Mandalay TV

Original release
- Network: Lifetime
- Release: March 21, 2009

Northern Lights, also known as Nora Roberts' Northern Lights, is a 2009 television film directed by Mike Robe, which stars Eddie Cibrian, LeAnn Rimes, and Rosanna Arquette. The film is based on the 2004 Nora Roberts novel of the same name and is part of the Nora Roberts 2009 movie collection, which also includes; Midnight Bayou, High Noon, and Tribute. The film debuted March 21, 2009, on Lifetime.

== Plot ==
Homicide detective Nate Burns (Cibrian) once lived a tough life in Baltimore, but decides to move to a small Alaskan town, after being offered the position of chief of police. Burns leaves Baltimore just a few weeks after his partner is shot and killed, feeling partially responsible for what has happened.

Nate finds himself not very welcome by the town's residents, but takes an immediate interest in Meg Galligan (Rimes). Meg is a young pilot, whose father left and disappeared in 1994; leaving her mother Charlene (Arquette), who Meg constantly argues with, to single-handedly take care of her.

Soon, Nate helps in the search and rescue of two lost mountain climbers, and asks for Meg's help in getting there. Upon their rescue, Nate also locates a frozen corpse, who turns out to be Meg's father. It's clear that he was murdered, as the axe used to kill him is still embedded in his body. Meg has trouble mourning for her father, because she has always been mad at him for abandoning his family.

Meg suggests that Nate begin to investigate, but he is reluctant to do so, explaining that he moved from Baltimore to avoid murder cases. After giving in, Nate starts collecting information, and soon finds that nobody in town liked the man, and that he had affairs with several of the townswomen.

Soon, Max, one of the locals, seemingly commits suicide. Nate believes that Max had something to do with Meg's father's death. This upsets Meg, as Max was a well-liked man in town. Eventually they find Max's journal, where he talks of two other men. Nate, however, doesn't believe he was the murderer, and refuses to believe that he committed suicide.

With the help of Meg, Nate continues the investigation. As they take their relationship to a new level, he finds out that they are being followed. Fearing for their own lives, Nate starts questioning everyone in town. Nate proposes to Meg, soon after, Nate is fired, because the locals have been complaining that all the trouble started after he arrived. Nate briefly considers returning to Baltimore, until he learns that an earring was found next to the body.

As the police arrive to arrest the murderer, the murderer takes a woman hostage and shoots Meg in the arm. The murderer is arrested after Nate shoots him.

== Cast ==
- LeAnn Rimes as Meg Galligan
- Eddie Cibrian as Nate Burns
- Greg Lawson as Ed Woolcott
- Rosanna Arquette as Charlene Galligan
- Jayne Eastwood as Mayor Hopp
- Stephen Huszar as Pat Galligan

== Production ==
The film was executive produced by Stephanie Germain and Peter Guber, who also 'e.p.-ed' seven other Roberts films for Lifetime in 2007 and 2009. Filming took place in and around Calgary, Alberta including the historical Wainwright Hotel in Heritage Park Historical Village.

== Home media ==
The film was released on DVD exclusively at Wal-mart B&M stores.
