= Blue Smoke (2007 film) =

2007 film by David Carson

- DVD cover
- Genre: Drama; Thriller
- Based on: Blue Smoke by Nora Roberts
- Screenplay by: Ronni Kern
- Directed by: David Carson
- Starring: Alicia Witt; Matthew Settle; Scott Bakula
- Music by: Chris P. Bacon; Stuart Michael Thomas
- Country of origin: United States
- Original language: English

Production
- Producer: Stephanie Germaine
- Cinematography: Nikos Evdemon
- Editor: Paul Dixon
- Running time: 96 minutes
- Production company: Mandalay TV

Original release
- Network: Lifetime
- Release: February 12, 2007

Blue Smoke is a 2007 American romantic drama television film directed by David Carson and starring Alicia Witt, Matthew Settle, and Scott Bakula. Written by Ronni Kern, based on the 2005 Nora Roberts novel of the same name, the film is about Reena Hale, a beautiful arson investigator whose boyfriends are murdered in fires set by a stalker who traumatized her years earlier. The film debuted February 12, 2007 on Lifetime.

== Plot ==
After watching a fire burn her family's Baltimore pizzeria to the ground, 11‑year-old Reena Hale (Witt) decides she wants to be an arson investigator when she grows up. And with the help of mentor John Minger (Bakula), whom she met during the investigation of her family's restaurant, Reena realizes her dream.

Years later, the grown up Reena buys a house in the old neighborhood, moving in next door to carpenter Bo Goodnight (Settle). As Reena and Bo embark on a relationship, a psychopathic arsonist from her past begins wreaking havoc on her life. Reena's stalker threatens her life, and those of her loved ones.

== Cast ==
- Alicia Witt as Reena Hale
  - Taylor Dauphinais as Young Reena Hale
- Scott Bakula as John Minger
- Matthew Settle as Bo Goodnight
- Talia Shire as Bianca Hale
- Eric Keenleyside as Gib Hale
- John Reardon as Josh
- Benjamin Ayres as Hugh
- Chris Fassbender as Joey Pastorelli Jr.
  - Liam Nelson as Young Joey Pastorelli Jr.
- David Lawrence Brown as Joe Pastorelli Sr.
- Rod Heatheringston as Steve
- Chad Nobert as Xander Hale
- Peter Skagen as FBI Agent
- Daniela Vlaskalic as Fran Hale

== Production ==
The executive producers of the film were Stephanie Germain and Peter Guber; they were also executive producers for seven other Nora Roberts films for Lifetime in 2007 and 2009. Blue Smoke was filmed on location in Calgary, Alberta, Canada between October 30 and November 24, 2006.
