= Angels Fall (film) =

2007 television film directed by Ralph Hemecker

- DVD cover
- Genre: Drama; Thriller
- Based on: Angels Fall by Nora Roberts
- Screenplay by: Janet Brownell
- Directed by: Ralph Hemecker
- Starring: Heather Locklear; Johnathon Schaech
- Music by: Chris P. Bacon; Stuart Michael Thomas
- Country of origin: United States
- Original language: English

Production
- Producer: Stephanie Germaine
- Cinematography: Joel Ransom
- Editor: Louis F. Cioffi
- Running time: 96 minutes
- Production company: Mandalay TV

Original release
- Network: Lifetime
- Release: January 29, 2007

Angels Fall is a 2007 American mystery thriller romantic drama television film directed by Ralph Hemecker and starring Heather Locklear and Johnathon Schaech. It is based on the 2006 Nora Roberts novel of the same name. The film is about a beautiful chef who moves to a small town in Wyoming after her Boston restaurant is shut down because of a fatal shooting. The film debuted January 29, 2007 on Lifetime Television. At the time, it was one of the top-ten watched telecasts in the history of the network.

== Summary ==
Reece Gilmore (Locklear) is the sole survivor of a massacre at a Boston restaurant where she worked as a chef. After a stay in a mental hospital due to PTSD, anxious and restless, she hits the open road with no destination in mind, desperate for a fresh start. When her car breaks down in a picturesque Wyoming town, Reece takes a job cooking at the local diner to earn enough to repair it and move on. But as she gets to know the townspeople, mystery writer Brody (Schaech) in particular, she considers putting the past behind her and settling down.

But then, while out hiking, she witnesses a murder. Reece is traumatized again, and not just by the killing, but also because, when the police go to check out the crime scene, there's no evidence of a murder taking place. The townspeople doubt her story due to her past, which leads everyone, including Reece, to question her sanity.

== Cast ==
- Heather Locklear as Reece Gilmore
- Johnathon Schaech as Brody
- Gary Hudson as Rick Marsden
- Derek Hamilton as Lo
- Linda Darlow as Joanie
- Lisa Marie Caruk as Linda Gail
- Len Crowther as Doc
- Pete Seadon as Mac Drubber
- Robert White as Lynt
- Christy Greene as Ginny
- Jemma Blackwell as Debbie Marsden
- Tamara Werden as Woman in Orange Hat
- Guillermo Ura as Serge
- Chezlene Kocian as Marlie
- Lori Ravensborg as Jeweler

== Production ==
The film was executive produced by Stephanie Germain and Peter Guber, who also 'e.p.-ed' seven other Roberts films for Lifetime in 2007 and 2009.

== Reception ==
Angels Fall was one of the top ten most-watched telecasts in the history of the channel.
