= Nora Roberts =

American author (born 1950)

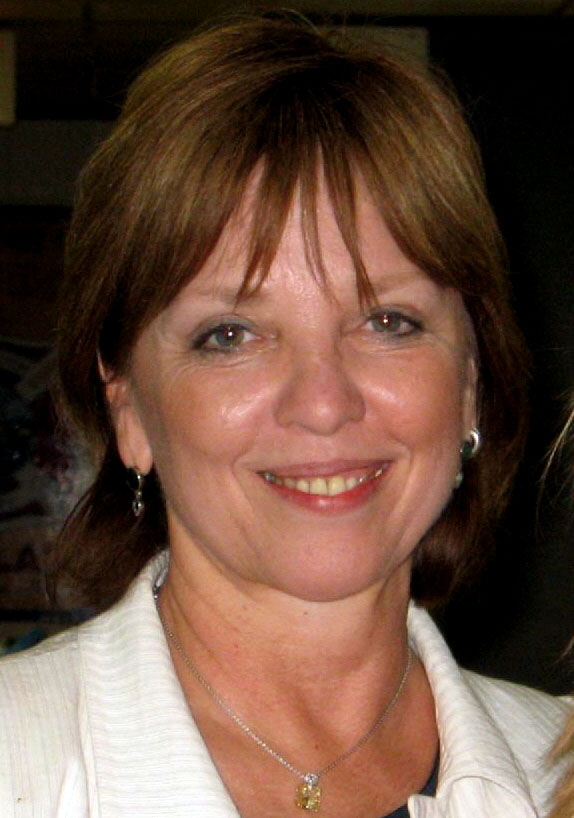
- Nora Roberts, 2007
- Born: Eleanor Marie Robertson; October 10, 1950 (age 76); Silver Spring, Maryland, U.S.
- Occupation: Novelist
- Spouses: Ronald Aufdem-Brinke (m. 1968; div. 1983) Bruce Wilder (m. 1985)
- Children: 2
- Writing career
- Pen name: Nora Roberts; J.D. Robb; Jill March; Sarah Hardesty
- Period: 1981–present
- Genres: Romance, fantasy, suspense
- Website: www.noraroberts.com

Nora Roberts (born Eleanor Marie Robertson on October 10, 1950) is an American author of over 225 novels, known for romance published under her own name. She also writes police procedurals which have elements of science fiction under the name J. D. Robb, and has published as Jill March and (in the U.K.) Sarah Hardesty.

== Life and career ==
=== Personal life ===
==== Early years ====
Roberts was born on October 10, 1950, in Silver Spring, Maryland, the youngest of five children. Her parents have Irish ancestry, and she has described herself as "an Irishwoman through and through". Her family were avid readers, so books were always important in her life. Although she had always imagined stories from childhood, Roberts did not write in her youth other than essays for school. She does claim to have "told lies. Really good ones—some of which my mother still believes." She credits the nuns at her Catholic school for instilling in her a sense of discipline.

==== Marriages ====
During her second year in high school, Roberts transferred to Montgomery Blair High School, where she met her first husband, Ronald Aufdem-Brinke. They married, against her parents' wishes, in 1968, as soon as she graduated, and settled in Boonsboro, Maryland.

Roberts's husband worked at his father's sheet-metal business before joining her parents in their lighting company. She gave birth to two sons. Roberts would later refer to this time period as her "Earth Mother" years, when she did crafts, including ceramics and sewing her children's clothes. The couple divorced in 1983.

Roberts met her second husband, Bruce Wilder, a carpenter, when she hired him to build bookshelves in July 1985. Her husband owns Turn the Page Books bookstore in Boonsboro and works as an adult content photographer and videographer. The couple also owned the nearby historic Boone Hotel. After it was destroyed by a fire in February 2008, it was restored and reopened as the Inn BoonsBoro in 2009; the suites were inspired by and named for literary romantic couples with happy endings.

She is an ardent baseball fan, having been honored by the former local minor league baseball team Hagerstown Suns several times.

=== Writing career ===
She began to write during a blizzard in February 1979. Roberts states that with three feet of snow, a dwindling supply of chocolate, and no morning kindergarten for her two boys, she had little else to do. She fell in love with the writing process, and quickly produced six manuscripts which she submitted to Harlequin, the leading publisher of romance novels, but was repeatedly rejected. Roberts says,

I got the standard rejection for the first couple of tries, then my favorite rejection of all time. I received my manuscript back with a nice little note which said that my work showed promise, and the story had been very entertaining and well done. But that they already had their American writer. That would have been Janet Dailey.

Dailey would go on to be embroiled in a plagiarism scandal in which she eventually confessed to stealing some of Roberts's work.

Roberts once stated: "You're going to be unemployed if you really think you just have to sit around and wait for the muse to land on your shoulder." She concentrates on one novel at a time, writing eight hours a day, every day, even while on vacation. Rather than begin with an outline, Roberts instead envisions a key incident, character, or setting. She then writes a short first draft that has the basic elements of a story. Roberts then goes back to the beginning of the novel. The second draft usually sees the addition of details, the "texture and color" of the work, as well as a more in-depth study of the characters. She then does a final pass to polish the novel before sending it to her agent, Amy Berkower.

She often writes trilogies, finishing the three books in a row so that she can remain with the same characters. In the past, her trilogies were all released in paperback, as Roberts believed the wait for hardcover editions was too long for the reader. All her new publications are released in hardcover first and e-book, with paperback editions following.

Roberts does much of her research over the Internet, as she has an aversion to flying.

=== Pseudonyms ===
==== Nora Roberts ====
In 1980, a new publisher, Silhouette Books, formed to take advantage of the manuscripts from the American writers that Harlequin had rejected. Roberts's first novel, Irish Thoroughbred, was published in 1981, using the pseudonym Nora Roberts, a shortened form of her birth name Eleanor Marie Robertson because she assumed that all romance authors had pen names.

Between 1982 and 1984, Roberts wrote 23 novels for Silhouette, published under various Silhouette imprints: Silhouette Sensation, Silhouette Special Edition and Silhouette Desire, as well as Silhouette Intrigue, and MIRA's reissue program. In 1985, Playing the Odds, the first novel in the MacGregor family series, was published and was an immediate bestseller.

In 1987, she began writing single title books for Bantam. Five years later she moved to Putnam to write single title hardcovers and original paperbacks, reaching the hardcover bestseller lists with her fourth hardcover release, 1996's Montana Sky. Roberts has continued to release single-title novels in paperback. She still occasionally writes shorter category romances. Her attachment to the shorter category books stems from her years as a young mother of two boys without much time to read, as she remembered "exactly what it felt like to want to read and not have time to read 200,000 words".

Roberts was featured in Pamela Regis's A Natural History of the Romance Novel. Regis calls Roberts "a master of the romance novel form", because she "has a keen ear for dialogue, constructs deft scenes, maintains a page-turning pace, and provides compelling characterization". Publishers Weekly once talked about her "wry humor and the use of different narrators, two devices that were once rarities" in the romance novel genre.

==== J. D. Robb ====
Roberts had long wanted to write romantic suspense in the vein of Mary Stewart, but, at the urging of her agent, she concentrated on classic contemporary romance while she built a following of readers. After moving to Putnam in 1992, the publishing company quickly realized that they were unable to keep up with Roberts's prolific output. They suggested that she adopt a second pseudonym so they would be able to publish more of her work each year.

Her agent, Amy Berkover, convinced the publishers to allow Roberts to write romantic suspense under the new name. She chose the pseudonym D. J. MacGregor, but right before publication, discovered it was in use by another author. Instead, her first romantic suspense novel was published in 1995 under the pseudonym J. D. Robb. The initials "J. D." were taken from her sons, Jason and Dan, while "Robb" is a shortened form of Roberts.

As J. D. Robb, Roberts has published a series of futuristic science fiction police procedurals. These books, all part of the in Death series, feature detective Eve Dallas and her husband Roarke and are set in a mid-21st century New York City. Despite the emphasis on solving a crime in each of the books, the overall theme of the series is the development of the relationship between Eve and Roarke. When the in Death series began, neither Roberts nor her publisher acknowledged that she was the author. They hoped to allow the series to stand on its own merits and build its own following.

After publishing 18 novels in the in Death series, Putnam published the nineteenth, Divided in Death, first in hardcover. The book became Roberts's first bestselling novel of 2004.

As of March 2022, Roberts has published 54 novels plus ten novellas in the in Death series.

==== Other pseudonyms ====
Roberts wrote a story for a magazine titled Melodies of Love under the pseudonym Jill March. She has also been known as Sarah Hardesty in the UK. When the Born In series was released in Britain it carried that name instead of Nora Roberts. She has since changed publishers.

=== Success ===
In 1996, Roberts passed the hundred-novel mark with Montana Sky and, in 2012, doubled that with The Witness. In both 1999 and 2000, four of the five novels that USA Today listed as the best-selling romance novels of the year were written by Roberts. Her first appearance on The New York Times Best Seller list came in 1991, and between 1991 and 2001, she had 68 New York Times Bestsellers, counting hardbacks and paperbacks. In 2001, Roberts had 10 best-selling mass-market paperbacks, according to Publishers Weekly, not counting those books written under the J.D. Robb name. In September 2001, for the first time Roberts took the numbers 1 and 2 spots on the Publishers Weekly bestseller list, as her romance Time and Again was number one, and her J.D. Robb release Seduction in Death was number two.

Since 1999, every one of Roberts's novels has been a New York Times bestseller, and 124 of her novels have ranked on the Times bestseller list, including 29 that debuted in the number-one spot. As of January 24, 2013, Roberts's novels had spent a combined 948 weeks on The New York Times Best Seller list, including 148 weeks in the number-one spot. As of January 9, 2009, 400 million copies of her books are in print, including 12 million copies sold in 2005 alone. Her novels have been published in 35 countries.

A founding member of the Romance Writers of America (RWA), Roberts was the first inductee in the organization's Hall of Fame. In 1997 she was awarded the RWA Lifetime Achievement Award, which in 2008 was renamed the RWA Nora Roberts Lifetime Achievement Award. As of 2012, she has won an unprecedented 21 of the RWA's RITA Awards, the highest honor given in the romance genre.

Two of Roberts' novels, Sanctuary and Magic Moments, had previously been made into TV movies. In 2007, Lifetime Television adapted four Nora Roberts novels into TV movies: Angels Fall starring Heather Locklear, Montana Sky starring Ashley Williams, Blue Smoke starring Alicia Witt, and Carolina Moon starring Claire Forlani. This was the first time that Lifetime had adapted multiple works by the same author. Four more films were released on four consecutive Saturdays in March and April 2009. The 2009 collection included Northern Lights starring LeAnn Rimes and Eddie Cibrian, Midnight Bayou starring Jerry O'Connell, High Noon starring Emilie de Ravin, and Tribute starring Brittany Murphy.

Time magazine named Roberts one of their 100 Most Influential People in 2007, saying she "has inspected, dissected, deconstructed, explored, explained and extolled the passions of the human heart". Roberts was one of only two authors on the list, the other being David Mitchell.

=== Victim of plagiarism ===
In 1997, another best-selling romance writer, Janet Dailey, admitted to repeatedly plagiarizing Roberts' work. The practice came to light after a reader read Roberts' Sweet Revenge and Dailey's Notorious back-to-back; she noticed several similarities and posted the comparable passages on the Internet. Calling the plagiarism "mind-boggling", Roberts sued Dailey. Dailey acknowledged the plagiarism and attributed it to a psychological disorder. She admitted that both Aspen Gold and Notorious lifted heavily from Roberts' work. Both of those novels were pulled from print after Dailey's admission. In April 1998, Dailey settled the case. Roberts donated the settlement to various literary causes including the Literacy Volunteers of America (now ProLiteracy).

Roberts joined the chorus strongly criticizing fellow romance writer Cassie Edwards, who had lifted many passages from much older sources (many in the public domain) without giving credit, forcing Edwards out of the business.

In 2019, Roberts, along with other authors, was a victim of plagiarism by Cristiane Serruya.

== Charity ==
Roberts has been included repeatedly on the Giving Back Fund's annual lists of the most philanthropic celebrities, with the bulk of her donations going to the Nora Roberts Foundation. The foundation financially supports organizations that promote literacy and the arts, assist children and engage in humanitarian efforts. The Foundation also endowed the Nora Roberts Center for American Romance at McDaniel College, which supports academic scholarship on the American romance novel, with special emphasis on the literary qualities and significance of the romance.

== Screen adaptations ==
- Magic Moments (1989)
- Sanctuary (2001)
- Angels Fall (2007)
- Montana Sky (2007)
- Blue Smoke (2007)
- Carolina Moon (2007)
- Northern Lights (2009)
- Midnight Bayou (2009)
- High Noon (2009)
- Tribute (2009)
- Carnal Innocence (2011)
- Brazen (2022)

=== Lifetime Movie Channel ===
Several of Roberts' books have been adapted into made-for-TV movies and aired on Lifetime.

The 2007 Collection featured:

- Angels Fall
- Montana Sky
- Blue Smoke
- Carolina Moon

The 2009 Collection featured:

- Northern Lights
- Midnight Bayou
- High Noon
- Tribute

Peter Guber's Mandalay TV and Stephanie Germain Prods. produced the eight adaptations.

== Awards ==
=== As Nora Roberts ===
==== Golden Medallion awards ====
Golden Medallion awards were awarded by the Romance Writers of America.

- The Heart's Victory: 1983 - Best Contemporary Sensual Romance
- Untamed: 1984 - Best Traditional Romance
- This Magic Moment: 1984 - Best Contemporary 65–80,000 words, shared with Deirdre Mardn's Destiny's Sweet Errand
- Opposites Attract: 1985 - Best Short Contemporary Romance
- A Matter of Choice: 1985 - Best Long Contemporary Series Romance
- One Summer: 1987 - Best Long Contemporary Series Romance
- Brazen Virtue: 1989 - Best Suspense

==== RITA Awards ====
RITA Awards are awarded by the Romance Writers of America.

- Night Shift: 1992 - Best Romantic Suspense
- Divine Evil: 1993 - Best Romantic Suspense
- Nightshade: 1994 - Best Romantic Suspense
- Private Scandals: 1994 - Best Contemporary Single Title
- Hidden Riches: 1995 - Best Romantic Suspense
- Born in Ice: 1996 - Best Contemporary Single Title
- Born in Ice: 1996 - Best Romance of 1995
- Carolina Moon: 2001 - Best Romantic Suspense
- Three Fates: 2003 - Best Romantic Suspense
- Remember When - Part 1: 2004 - Best Romantic Suspense
- Birthright: 2004 - Best Contemporary Single Title
- Tribute: 2009 - Best Novel with Strong Romantic Elements

==== Quill Awards ====
Quill Awards are awarded by the Quills Foundation.

- Angels Fall: 2006 Book of the year
- Angels Fall: 2006 Romance
- Blue Smoke: 2007 Romance

==== Romantic Times Reviewers' Choice ====
- Divine Evil: 1993 - Best Suspense Novel

==== AAR (All About Romance) Annual Reader Poll ====
- Sea Swept: 1999 - Best Romance Novels (Favorite Romance of the Year)

=== As J. D. Robb ===
==== RITA Awards ====
- Survivor in Death: 2006 - Romantic Suspense winner
- New York to Dallas: 2012 - Best Romantic Suspense winner
- Concealed in Death: 2015 - Romantic Suspense

==== AAR (All About Romance) Annual Reader Poll ====
- Loyalty in Death: 2000 - Romance Novels (Favorite Romantic Suspense) and Romance Novels (Favorite "Other" Romance)
- Portrait In Death: 2004 - Romance Novels (Best Alternate Reality)

== General sources ==
- Little, Denise and Laura Hayden, The Official Nora Roberts Companion, Berkley Books, 2003, ISBN 0-425-18344-0.
- Lennard, John, "Of Pseudonyms and Sentiment: Nora Roberts, J. D. Robb, and the Imperative Mood", in Of Modern Dragons and other essays on Genre Fiction (Tirril: Humanities-Ebooks, 2007), pp. 56–86. ISBN 978-1-84760-038-7
- Regis, Pamela (2003), A Natural History of the Romance Novel, Philadelphia: University of Pennsylvania Press, pp. 183–184, ISBN 0-8122-3303-4
