= Nora Roberts bibliography =

The list of works by Nora Roberts includes all of the novels and novellas published by author Nora Roberts. The list is in order by year, and within each year it is in alphabetical order. It includes books published under the names Nora Roberts, J.D. Robb, and Jill March. The complete listing of J.D. Robb novels, in series order, can also be found at in Death.

The years listed below are the years the novels or novellas were originally issued. Many of those novels have been, or will be, reissued, especially in compilations. Such reissues are marked in this list with the year of original publication. To avoid confusion, all of Roberts's new releases include a logo that is a circle with the initials "NR" inside, indicating that the book has never been published before.

Key:

- Title (Contents notes) [if any], Series (number in series) [if any], Publisher

== 1980s ==
- 1981
  - Irish Thoroughbred, Irish Hearts (1 of 3), Silhouette Romance
- 1982
  - Blithe Images, Silhouette Romance
  - Heart's Victory, Silhouette Special Edition
  - Island of Flowers, Silhouette Romance
  - Melodies of Love (written as Jill March, "appeared in 'a periodical' which is no longer in business")
  - Search For Love, Silhouette
  - Song of the West, Silhouette
- 1983
  - From This Day, Silhouette Romance
  - Her Mother’s Keeper, Silhouette Romance
  - Once More with Feeling, Silhouette Intimate Moments
  - Reflections, Reflections & Dreams or the Davidov series (1 of 2), Silhouette Special Edition
  - Dance of Dreams, Reflections & Dreams or the Davidov series (2 of 2), Silhouette Special Edition
  - This Magic Moment, Silhouette Intimate Moments
  - Tonight and Always, Silhouette Intimate Moments
  - Untamed, Silhouette
- 1984
  - Endings and Beginnings, Silhouette Intimate Moments
  - First Impressions, Silhouette Special Edition
  - The Law is a Lady, Silhouette Special Edition
  - Less of a Stranger, Silhouette Romance
  - A Matter of Choice, Silhouette Intimate Moments
  - Opposites Attract, Silhouette Special Edition
  - Promise Me Tomorrow, Pocket
  - Rules of the Game, Silhouette Intimate Moments
  - Storm Warning, Silhouette
  - Sullivan’s Woman, Silhouette
- 1985
  - Boundary Lines, Silhouette Intimate Moments
  - Dual Image, Silhouette
  - Night Moves, Harlequin Intrigue
  - Partners, Silhouette Intimate Moments
  - Playing the Odds, The MacGregors (1 of 9), Silhouette Special Edition
  - Tempting Fate, The MacGregors (2 of 9), Silhouette Special Edition
  - All the Possibilities, The MacGregors (3 of 9), Silhouette Special Edition
  - One Man's Art, The MacGregors (4 of 9), Silhouette Special Edition
  - The Right Path, Silhouette Intimate Moments
  - Summer Desserts, Great Chefs (1 of 2), Silhouette Special Edition
- 1986
  - Affaire Royale, Cordina's Royal Family (1 of 4), Silhouette
  - The Art of Deception, Silhouette Intimate Moments
  - Home for Christmas (novella, from Silhouette Christmas Stories anthology), Silhouette
  - Lessons Learned, Great Chefs (2 of 2), Silhouette Special Edition
  - Second Nature, Celebrity Magazine (1 of 2), Silhouette Special Edition
  - Risky Business, Silhouette Intimate Moments
  - One Summer, Celebrity Magazine (2 of 2), Silhouette Special Edition
  - Treasures Lost, Treasures Found, Silhouette Intimate Moments
  - A Will and a Way, Silhouette Special Edition
- 1987
  - Command Performance, Cordina's Royal Family (2 of 4), Silhouette Intimate Moments
  - For Now, Forever, The MacGregors (5 of 9), Silhouette Special Edition
  - Hot Ice, Bantam
  - Mind Over Matter, Silhouette Intimate Moments
  - The Playboy Prince, Cordina's Royal Family (3 of 4), Silhouette Intimate Moments
  - Sacred Sins, Sacred Sins (1 of 2), Bantam
  - Temptation, Silhouette
- 1988
  - Brazen Virtue, Sacred Sins (2 of 2), Bantam
  - Irish Rose, Irish Hearts (2 of 3), Silhouette Intimate Moments
  - The Last Honest Woman, The O'Hurley's (1 of 4), Silhouette Special Edition
  - Dance to the Piper, The O'Hurley's (2 of 4), Silhouette Special Edition
  - Skin Deep, The O'Hurley's (3 of 4), Silhouette Special Edition
  - Local Hero, Silhouette Special Edition
  - Name of the Game, Silhouette Intimate Moments
  - Rebellion (novella from Forever Mine anthology), The MacGregors (addition to series), Harlequin Historical
- 1989
  - Lawless, Loving Jack (1 of 3), Harlequin Historical
  - Loving Jack, Loving Jack (2 of 3), Silhouette Special Edition
  - Best Laid Plans, Loving Jack (2 of 3), Silhouette Special Edition
  - Gabriel’s Angel, Silhouette Intimate Moments
  - Impulse (novella, from Silhouette Summer Sizzlers anthology), Silhouette
  - Sweet Revenge, Bantam
  - Time Was, Time and Again or The Hornblower Bros. (1 of 2), Silhouette Intimate Moments
  - The Welcoming, Silhouette Special Edition

== 1990s ==
- 1990
  - In From the Cold (novella, from Historical Christmas Stories 1990 anthology), The MacGregors (addition to series), Harlequin
  - Public Secrets, Bantam
  - Taming Natasha, The Stanislaskis or Those Wild Ukrainians (1 of 6), Silhouette Special Edition
  - Times Change, Time and Again or The Hornblower Bros. (2 of 2), Silhouette Intimate Moments
  - Without a Trace, The O'Hurley's (4 of 4), Silhouette Special Edition
- 1991
  - Courting Catherine, The Calhoun Women (1 of 5), Silhouette Romance
  - A Man for Amanda, The Calhoun Women (2 of 5), Silhouette Desire
  - For the Love of Lilah, The Calhoun Women (3 of 5), Silhouette Special Edition
  - Genuine Lies, Bantam
  - Luring a Lady, The Stanislaskis or Those Wild Ukrainians (2 of 6), Silhouette Special Edition
  - Night Shift, Night Tales (1 of 5), Silhouette Intimate Moments
  - Night Shadow, Night Tales (2 of 5), Silhouette Intimate Moments
  - Suzanna’s Surrender, The Calhoun Women (4 of 5), Silhouette Intimate Moments
- 1992
  - Captivated, The Donovan Legacy (1 of 4), Silhouette Special Edition
  - Entranced, The Donovan Legacy (2 of 4), Silhouette Special Edition
  - Carnal Innocence, Bantam
  - Charmed, The Donovan Legacy (3 of 4), Silhouette Special Edition
  - Divine Evil, Bantam
  - Honest Illusions, Putnam
  - Unfinished Business, Silhouette Intimate Moments
  - Cordina's Crown Jewel, Cordina's Royal Family (4 of 4), Silhouette Intimate Moments
- 1993
  - Falling for Rachel, The Stanislaskis or Those Wild Ukrainians (3 of 6), Silhouette Special Edition
  - Nightshade, Night Tales (3 of 5), Silhouette Intimate Moments
  - Private Scandals, Putnam
- 1994
  - All I Want for Christmas (novella, from Jingle Bells, Wedding Bells anthology), Silhouette
  - The Best Mistake (novella, from Birds, Bees and Babies '94 anthology), Silhouette
  - Born in Fire, The Concannon Sisters or Born in Trilogy (1 of 3), Jove
  - Convincing Alex, The Stanislaskis or Those Wild Ukrainians (4 of 6), Silhouette Special Edition
  - Hidden Riches, Putnam
  - Night Smoke, Night Tales (4 of 5), Silhouette Intimate Moments
- 1995
  - Born in Ice, The Concannon Sisters or Born in Trilogy (2 of 3), Jove
  - Naked in Death, In Death 1, Berkley
  - Glory in Death, In Death 2, Berkley
  - The Return of Rafe MacKade, The MacKade Brothers (1 of 4), Silhouette Intimate Moments
  - The Pride of Jared MacKade, The MacKade Brothers (2 of 4), Silhouette Special Edition
  - True Betrayals, Jove
- 1996
  - Born in Shame, The Concannon Sisters or Born in Trilogy (3 of 3), Jove
  - The Calhoun Women (compilation: Courting Catherine, A Man for Amanda, For the Love of Lilah, and Suzanna's Surrender (all 1991) ), The Calhoun Women (1-4 of 5), Silhouette
  - Daring to Dream, Dream or Templeton House (1 of 3), Jove
  - The Heart of Devin MacKade, The MacKade Brothers (3 of 4), Silhouette Intimate Moments
  - The Fall of Shane MacKade, The MacKade Brothers (4 of 4), Silhouette Special Edition
  - From the Heart (compilation: Tonight and Always (1983), A Matter of Choice (1984), and Endings and Beginnings (1984) ), Jove
  - Immortal in Death, In Death 3, Berkley
  - Megan’s Mate, The Calhoun Women (5 of 5), Silhouette Intimate Moments
  - Montana Sky, Putnam
  - Rapture in Death, In Death 4, Berkley
- 1997
  - Hidden Star, Stars of Mithra (1 of 3), Silhouette Intimate Moments
  - Captive Star, Stars of Mithra (2 of 3), Silhouette Intimate Moments
  - Ceremony in Death, In Death 5, Berkley
  - Holding the Dream, Dream or Templeton House (2 of 3), Jove
  - Finding the Dream, Dream or Templeton House (3 of 3), Jove
  - The MacGregor Brides, The MacGregors (6 of 9), Silhouette
  - Sanctuary, Putnam
  - The Stanislaski Sisters: Natasha and Rachel (compilation: Taming Natasha (1990) and Falling for Rachel (1993) ), The Stanislaskis or Those Wild Ukrainians (1 & 3 of 6), Silhouette
  - Vengeance in Death, In Death 6, Berkley
  - Waiting for Nick, The Stanislaskis or Those Wild Ukrainians (5 of 6), Silhouette Special Edition
- 1998
  - The Calhoun Women: Catherine and Amanda (compilation: Courting Catherine (1991) and A Man for Amanda (1991) ), The Calhoun Women (1 & 2 of 5), Silhouette
  - The Calhoun Women: Lilah and Suzanna (compilation: For the Love of Lilah (1991) and Suzanna's Surrender (1991) ), The Calhoun Women (3 & 4 of 5), unknown
  - Holiday in Death, In Death 7, Berkley
  - Homeport, Putnam
  - The MacGregors: Serena ~ Caine (compilation: Playing the Odds (1985) and Tempting Fate (1985) ), The MacGregors (1 & 2 of 9), Silhouette
  - The MacGregor Grooms, The MacGregors (8 of 9), Silhouette
  - Midnight in Death (novella, from Silent Night anthology), In Death 7.5, Jove
  - The Reef, Putnam
  - Rising Tides, Chesapeake Bay or Quinn Bros. (2 of 4), Jove
  - Sea Swept, Chesapeake Bay or Quinn Bros. (1 of 4), Jove
  - Secret Star, Stars of Mithra (3 of 3), Silhouette Intimate Moments
  - Spellbound (novella, from Once Upon A Castle anthology), Once Upon novellas (1 of 6), Jove
  - Three Complete Novels (compilation: Born in Fire (1994), Born in Ice (1995), and Born in Shame (1996) ), The Concannon Sisters or Born in Trilogy (1-3 of 3), Putnam
  - The Winning Hand, The MacGregors (7 of 9), Silhouette Special Edition
- 1999
  - Conspiracy in Death, In Death 8, Berkley
  - The Donovan Legacy (compilation: Captivated, Entranced, and Charmed (all 1992) ), The Donovan Legacy (1-3 of 4), Silhouette
  - Enchanted, The Donovan Legacy (4 of 4), Silhouette
  - Ever After (novella, from Once Upon A Star anthology), Once Upon novellas (2 of 6), Jove
  - Inner Harbor, Chesapeake Bay or Quinn Bros. (3 of 4), Jove
  - Jewels of the Sun, Irish Trilogy or Gallaghers of Ardmore (1 of 3), Jove
  - Loyalty in Death, In Death 9, Berkley
  - The MacGregors: Alan ~ Grant (compilation: All the Possibilities and One Man's Art (both 1985) ), The MacGregors (3 & 4 of 9), Silhouette
  - The MacGregors: Daniel ~ Ian (compilation: For Now, Forever (1997) and In from the Cold (1990) ), The MacGregors (5 of 9 and novella), Silhouette
  - The Perfect Neighbor, The MacGregors (9 of 9), Silhouette Special Edition
  - River’s End, Putnam
  - Three Complete Novels (compilation: Daring to Dream (1996), Holding the Dream (1997), and Finding the Dream (1997) ), Dream or Templeton House (1-3 of 3), Putnam

== 2000s ==
- 2000
  - Carolina Moon, Putnam
  - "Christmas in Ardmore" (short story), Irish Trilogy or Gallaghers of Ardmore (addition to series), Jove
  - "Christmas with the Quinns” (short story), Chesapeake Bay or Quinn Bros. (addition to series), Jove
  - Heart of the Sea, Irish Trilogy or Gallaghers of Ardmore (3 of 3), Jove
  - In Dreams (novella, from Once Upon A Dream anthology), Once Upon novellas (3 of 6), Jove
  - Irish Hearts [duplicated title - see 2007] (compilation: Irish Thoroughbred (1981) & Irish Rose (1988)), Irish Hearts (1 & 2 of 3), Silhouette
  - Irish Rebel, Irish Hearts (3 of 3), Silhouette Special Edition
  - Judgment in Death, In Death 11, Berkley
  - Night Shield, Night Tales (5 of 5), Silhouette Intimate Moments
  - Night Tales (compilation: Night Shift (1991), Night Shadow (1991), Nightshade (1993), and Night Smoke (1994) ), Night Tales (1-4 of 5), Silhouette
  - The Stanislaski Brothers: Mikhail and Alex (compilation: Luring a Lady (1991) and Convincing Alex (1994) ), The Stanislaskis or Those Wild Ukrainians (2 & 4 of 6), Silhouette
  - Tears of the Moon, Irish Trilogy or Gallaghers of Ardmore(2 of 3), Jove
  - Three Complete Novels (compilation: Honest Illusions (1992), Private Scandals (1993), and Hidden Riches (1994) ), Putnam
  - Witness in Death, In Death 10, Berkley
- 2001
  - Betrayal in Death, In Death 12, Berkley
  - Chapter 2 (novella(?), from Naked Came the Phoenix anthology), St. Martin's Minotaur
  - Considering Kate, The Stanislaskis or Those Wild Ukrainians (6 of 6), Silhouette Special Edition
  - Dance Upon the Air, Three Sisters Island (1 of 3), Jove
  - Heaven and Earth, Three Sisters Island (2 of 3), Jove
  - Interlude in Death (novella(?), from Out of this World anthology), In Death 12.5, Jove
  - Midnight Bayou, Putnam
  - Reflections and Dreams (compilation: Reflections and Dance of Dreams (both 1983) ), Reflections and Dreams or the Davidov series (1 & 2 of 2), Silhouette
  - Seduction in Death, In Death 13, Berkley
  - Three Complete Novels (compilation: True Betrayals (1996), Montana Sky (1996), and Sanctuary (1997) ), Putnam
  - Time and Again (compilation: Time Was (1989) and Times Change (1990) ), Time and Again or The Hornblower Bros. (1 & 2 of 2), Silhouette
  - The Villa, Jove
  - Winter Rose (novella, from Once Upon A Rose anthology), Once Upon novellas (4 of 6), Jove
- 2002
  - Chesapeake Blue, Chesapeake Bay or Quinn Bros. (4 of 4), Putnam
  - Cordina’s Crown Jewel (1992), Cordina's Royal Family (4 of 4), Silhouette Special Edition
  - Cordina's Royal Family (compilation: Affaire Royale (1986), Command Performance (1987), and The Playboy Prince (1987) ), Cordina's Royal Family (1-3 of 4), Silhouette
  - Dangerous (compilation: Risky Business (1986), Storm Warning (1984), and The Welcoming (1989) ), Silhouette
  - Face the Fire, Three Sisters Island (3 of 3), Jove
  - Going Home (compilation: Mind Over Matter (1987), Unfinished Business (1992), and Island of Flowers (1982) ), Silhouette
  - A Little Magic (compilation: Spellbound (1998), Ever After (1999), and In Dreams (2000) ), Once Upon novellas (1-3 of 6), Berkley
  - Purity in Death, In Death 15, Berkley
  - Reunion in Death, In Death 14, Berkley
  - Summer Pleasures (compilation: One Summer and Second Nature (both 1986) ), Celebrity magazine (1 & 2 of 2), Silhouette
  - Table for Two (compilation: Summer Desserts (1985) and Lessons Learned (1986) ), Great Chefs (1 & 2 of 2), Silhouette
  - Three Fates, Putnam
  - A World Apart (novella, from Once Upon a Kiss anthology), Once Upon novellas (5 of 6), Jove
- 2003
  - Birthright, Putnam
  - Engaging the Enemy (compilation: A Will and A Way (1986) and Boundary Lines (1985) ), Silhouette
  - Imitation in Death, In Death 17, Berkley
  - Irish Born (compilation: Born in Fire (1984), Born in Ice (1985), and Born in Shame (1986); compare Three Complete Novels (1998) ), The Concannon Sisters or Born in Trilogy (1-3 of 3), Berkley
  - Key of Knowledge, Key Trilogy (2 of 3), Jove
  - Key of Light, Key Trilogy (1 of 3), Jove
  - Love by Design (compilation: Loving Jack, Best Laid Plans, and Lawless (all 1989) ), Loving Jack (1-3 of 3), Silhouette
  - Mysterious (compilation: Search for Love (1982), This Magic Moment (1983), and The Right Path (1985) ), Berkley
  - Portrait in Death, In Death 16, Berkley
  - Remember When (original compilation: "Big Jack" (Robb) and "Hot Rocks" (Roberts); reissued independently in 2010 ), In Death 17.5, Putnam
  - Suspicious (compilation: Partners (1985), The Art of Deception (1986), and Night Moves (1985) ), Silhouette
  - Truly, Madly Manhattan (compilation: Dual Image (1985) and Local Hero (1988) ), Silhouette
  - Two of a Kind (compilation: Impulse (1989) and The Best Mistake (1994) ), Silhouette
  - The Witching Hour (novella, from Once Upon a Midnight anthology), Once Upon novellas (6 of 6), Jove
- 2004
  - Blue Dahlia, In the Garden (1 of 3), Jove
  - Born O'Hurley (compilation: The Last Honest Woman and Dance to the Piper (both 1988) ), The O'Hurleys (1 & 2 of 4), Silhouette
  - Charmed & Enchanted (compilation: Charmed (1992) and Enchanted (1999) ), The Donovan Legacy (3 & 4 of 4), Silhouette
  - Divided in Death, In Death 18, Putnam
  - The Gift (compilation: Home for Christmas (1986) and All I Want for Christmas (1994) ), Silhouette
  - Key of Valor, Key Trilogy (3 of 3), Jove
  - A Little Fate (compilation: Winter Rose (2001), A World Apart (2002) and The Witching Hour (2003) ), Once Upon novellas (4-6 of 6), Jove
  - Lovers & Dreamers (compilation: Daring to Dream (1996), Holding the Dream (1997), and Finding the Dream (1997); original compilation 1999 ), Dream or Templeton House (1-3 of 3), Penguin
  - The MacKade Brothers: Devin and Shane (compilation: The Heart of Devin MacKade and The Fall of Shane MacKade (both 1996) ), The MacKade Brothers (3 & 4 of 4), Silhouette
  - The MacKade Brothers: Rafe and Jared (compilation: The Return of Rafe MacKade and The Pride of Jared MacKade (both 1995) ), The MacKade Brothers (1 & 2 of 4), Silhouette
  - Northern Lights, Putnam
  - Reunion (compilation: Once More with Feeling (1983) and Treasures Lost, Treasures Found (1986) ), Silhouette
  - Visions in Death, In Death 19, Putnam
  - Winner Takes All (compilation: Rules of the Game (1984) and The Name of the Game (?, 1988) ), Silhouette
  - With Open Arms (compilation: Song of the West (1982) and Her Mother's Keeper (1983) ), Silhouette
  - Wolf Moon (novella, from Moon Shadows anthology), Jove
- 2005
  - Black Rose, In the Garden (2 of 3), Jove
  - Blue Smoke, Putnam
  - The Calhouns: Catherine, Amanda, & Lilah (compilation: Courting Catherine, A Man for Amanda, and For the Love of Lilah (all 1991) ), The Calhoun Women (1-3 of 5), Silhouette
  - The Calhouns: Suzanna and Megan (compilation: Suzanna's Surrender (1991) and Megan's Mate (1996)), The Calhoun Women (4 & 5 of 5), Silhouette
  - Night Tales [blue] (compilation: Night Shift and Night Shadow (both 1991) ), Night Tales (1 & 2 of 5), Silhouette
  - Night Tales [green] (compilation: Nightshade (1993) and Night Smoke (1994) ), Night Tales (3 & 4 of 5), Silhouette
  - Night Tales [pink] (compilation: Night Shield (2000) and Night Moves (1985) ), Night Tales (5 of 5 & non-series), Silhouette
  - O'Hurley's Return (compilation: Skin Deep (1988) and Without a Trace (1990) ), The O'Hurleys (3 & 4 of 4), Silhouette
  - Origin in Death, In Death 21, Berkley
  - Red Lily, In the Garden (3 of 3), Jove
  - Rules of Play (compilation: Opposites Attract (1984) and The Heart's Victory (?, 1982) ), Silhouette
  - Spellbound (1988), Once Upon novellas (1 of 6), Jove
  - Survivor in Death, In Death 20, Berkley
- 2006
  - Angels Fall, Jove
  - "Haunted in Death" (short story, from Bump in the Night anthology), In Death 22.5, Jove
  - Born in Death, In Death 23, Berkley
  - Cordina's Royal Family: Bennett & Camilla (compilation: The Playboy Prince (1987) and Cordina's Crown Jewel (1992) ), Cordina's Royal Family (3 & 4 of 4), Silhouette
  - Cordina's Royal Family: Gabriella & Alexander (compilation: Affaire Royale (1986) and Command Performance (1987) ), Cordina's Royal Family (1 & 2 of 4), Silhouette
  - Morrigan's Cross, The Circle Trilogy (1 of 3), Jove
  - Dream Makers (compilation: Untamed (1983) and Less of a Stranger (1984) ), Silhouette Special Releases
  - Memory in Death, In Death 22, Berkley
  - Dance of the Gods, The Circle Trilogy (2 of 3), Jove
  - The Quinn Brothers: Cam & Ethan (compilation: Sea Swept and Rising Tides (both 1998) ), Chesapeake Bay or Quinn Bros. (1 & 2 of 4), Berkley
  - The Quinn Legacy: Phillip & Seth (compilation: Inner Harbor (1999) and Chesapeake Blue (2002) ), Chesapeake Bay or Quinn Bros. (3 & 4 of 4), Berkley
  - Valley of Silence, The Circle Trilogy (3 of 3), Jove
  - Innocent in Death, In Death 24, Berkley
- 2007
  - Blood Brothers, Sign of Seven trilogy (1 of 3), Jove
  - Creation in Death, In Death 25, Berkley
  - "Eternity in Death" (short story, from Dead of Night anthology), In Death 24.5, Jove
  - High Noon, Putnam
  - Irish Dreams (compilation: Irish Rebel (2000) and Sullivan's Woman (1984) ), Irish Hearts ?, Silhouette Special Releases
  - Irish Hearts [duplicated title; see 2000], (compilation: Irish Thoroughbred (1981) and Irish Rose (1988) ), Irish Hearts (1 & 2 of 3), Silhouette Special Releases
  - Stars (compilation: Hidden Star (1997) and Captive Star (1997) ), Stars of Mithra (1 & 2 of 3), Silhouette
  - The MacGregors: Robert ~ Cybil (compilation: The Winning Hand (1998) and The Perfect Neighbor (1999) ), The MacGregors (7 & 9 of 9), Silhouette
- 2008
  - First Impressions (compilation: "First Impressions" (1984) and "Blithe Images" (1982) ), Silhouette
  - The Hollow, Sign of Seven trilogy (2 of 3), Jove
  - The Pagan Stone, Sign of Seven trilogy (3 of 3), Jove
  - "Ritual in Death" (short story, from Suite 606 anthology), In Death 27.5, Berkley
  - Salvation in Death, In Death 27, Putnam Adult
  - Strangers in Death, In Death 26, Putnam Adult
  - Three in Death (compilation: "Interlude in Death" (2001), "Midnight in Death" (1998), and "Haunted in Death" (2006) ), In Death, Jove (January 2008)
  - Treasures (compilation: "Secret Star" (1998) and "Treasures Lost, Treasures Found" (1986) ), Silhouette
  - Tribute, Putnam Adult
- 2009
  - Bed of Roses, The Bride Quartet (2 of 4), Berkley Trade
  - Black Hills, Putnam Adult
  - Kindred in Death, In Death 29, Putnam Adult
  - The Law of Love (compilation: "Lawless" (1989) and "The Law is a Lady" (1984) ), Silhouette (May 2009)
  - '"Missing in Death" (short story, in The Lost anthology), In Death 29.5, Jove
  - Promises in Death, In Death 28, Putnam Adult
  - Vision In White, The Bride Quartet (1 of 4), Berkley Trade
  - Windfall (compilation: "Impulse" (1989) and "Temptation" (1984) ), Silhouette
  - Worth the Risk (compilation: "Partners" (1985) and "The Art of Deception" (1986) ), Silhouette

== 2010s ==
- 2010
  - Fantasy in Death, In Death 30, Putnam Adult (February 2010)
  - Hot Rocks, (independent reissue from 2003 original compilation "Remember When"), Jove (February 2010)
  - Big Jack, (independent reissue from 2003 original compilation "Remember When"), In Death 17.5, Berkley (March 2010)
  - Savor the Moment, The Bride Quartet (3 of 4), Berkley Trade (May 2010)
  - The Search, Putnam Adult (July 2010)
  - Indulgence in Death, In Death 31, Putnam Adult (November 2010)
  - "Possession in Death" (short story in The Other Side anthology), In Death 31.5, Jove (November 2010)
  - Happy Ever After, The Bride Quartet (4 of 4), Berkley Trade (November 2010)
  - Secrets and Sunsets, (compilation: "Risky Business" (1986) and "Mind Over Matter" (1987) ), Silhouette (May 2010)
- 2011
  - Treachery in Death, In Death 32, Putnam Adult (February 2011)
  - Chasing Fire, Putnam Adult (April 2011)
  - Time of Death (compilation: "Eternity in Death" (2007), "Ritual in Death" (2008), "Missing in Death" (2009)), In Death, Berkley Trade (June 2011)
  - New York to Dallas, In Death 33, Putnam Adult (September 2011)
  - "Chaos in Death", (short story in The Unquiet anthology), In Death 33.5, Jove (September 2011)
  - The Next Always, Inn Boonsboro Trilogy (1 of 3), Berkley Trade (November 2011)
  - Chesapeake Bay Saga, e-book (compilation: "Sea Swept", "Rising Tide", "Inner Harbor", "Chesapeake Blue") Penguin Publishing (2011)
  - Dream Trilogy, e-book (compilation: "Daring to Dream", "Holding the Dream", "Finding the Dream") Penguin Publishing (2011)
  - Key Trilogy, e-book (compilation: "Key of Light", "Key of Knowledge", "Key of Valor") Penguin Publishing (2011)
  - The Novels of Nora Roberts Volume 1, e-book (compilation: "Honest Illustions", "Hidden Riches", "True Betrayals", "Montana Sky") Jove Books (2011)
  - The Novels of Nora Roberts Volume 2, e-book (compilation: "Sanctuary", "Homeport", "The Reef", "Carolina Moon") Penguin Publishing (2011)
  - The Novels of Nora Roberts Volume 3, e-book (compilation: "The Villa", "Midnight Bayou", "Three Fates", "Birthright", "Northern Lights") Penguin Publishing (2011)
- 2012
  - Celebrity In Death, In Death 34, Putnam Adult (February 2012)
  - The Witness, Putnam Adult (April 2012)
  - The Last Boyfriend, Inn Boonsboro Trilogy (2 of 3), Berkley Trade (May 2012)
  - Delusion in Death, In Death 35, Putnam Adult (September 2012)
  - The Perfect Hope, Inn Boonsboro Trilogy (3 of 3), Berkley Trade (November 2012)
- 2013
  - Calculated In Death, In Death 36, Putnam Adult (February 2013)
  - Whiskey Beach, Putnam Adult (April 2013)
  - Thankless in Death, In Death 37, Putnam Adult (September 2013)
  - "Taken in Death", (short story in Mirror, Mirror anthology), In Death 37.5, Jove (October 2013)
  - Dark Witch, Cousins O'Dwyer Trilogy (1 of 3), Berkley Trade (November 2013)
  - Irish Legacy Trilogy Collection, e-book, Penguin Publishing, (compilation: "Irish Thoroughbred", "Irish Rose", "Irish Rebel") (2013)
- 2014
  - Concealed in Death, In Death 38, Putnam Adult (February 2014)
  - Shadow Spell, Cousins O'Dwyer Trilogy (2 of 3), Berkley Trade (March 2014)
  - The Collector, Putnam Adult (April 2014)
  - Blood Magick, Cousins O'Dwyer Trilogy (3 of 3), Berkley Trade (November 2014)
  - Festive in Death, In Death 39, Putnam Adult (September 2014)
- 2015
  - Obsession in Death, In Death 40, Putnam Adult (February 2015)
  - The Liar, Putnam Adult (April 2015)
  - Devoted in Death, In Death 41, Putnam Adult (September 2015)
  - Stars of Fortune, Guardians Trilogy (1 of 3), Putnam Adult (November 2015)
  - Wonderment in Death, In Death 41.5, Berkley (September 2015) This a novella published originally as part of the Down the Rabbit Hole anthology containing works by various authors.
- 2016
  - Brotherhood in Death, In Death 42, Putnam Adult (February 2016)
  - The Obsession, Putnam Adult (April 2016)
  - Bay of Sighs, Guardians Trilogy (2 of 3), Putnam Adult (June 2016)
  - Apprentice in Death, In Death 43, Putnam Adult (September 2016)
  - Island of Glass, Guardians Trilogy (3 of 3), Putnam Adult (December 2016)
- 2017
  - Echoes in Death, In Death 44, St. Martin's Press (February 2017)
  - Come Sundown, St. Martin's Press (June 2017)
  - Secrets in Death, In Death 45, St. Martin's Press (September 2017)
  - Year One, Chronicles of the One 1, St. Martin's Press (December 2017)
- 2018
  - Dark in Death, In Death 46, St. Martin's Press (January 2018)
  - Shelter in Place, St. Martin's Press (May 2018)
  - Leverage in Death, In Death 47, St. Martin's Press (September 2018)
  - Of Blood & Bone, Chronicles of the One 2, St. Martin's Press (December 2018)
- 2019
  - Connections in Death, In Death 48, St. Martin's Press (February 2019)
  - Under Currents, St. Martin's Press (July 2019)
  - Vendetta in Death, In Death 49, St. Martin's Press (September 2019)
  - The Rise of Magicks, Chronicles of the One 3, St. Martin's Press (December 2019)

== 2020s ==
- 2020
  - Golden in Death, In Death 50, St. Martin's Press (February 2020)
  - Hideaway, St. Martin's Press (July 2020)
  - Shadows in Death, In Death 51, St. Martin's Press (September 2020)
  - The Awakening, The Dragon Heart Legacy 1, St. Martin's Press (November 2020)
- 2021
  - Faithless in Death, In Death 52, St. Martin's Press (February 2021)
  - Legacy, St. Martin's Press (May 2021)
  - Forgotten in Death, In Death 53, St. Martin's Press (September 2021)
  - The Becoming, The Dragon Heart Legacy 2, St. Martin's Press (November 2021)
- 2022
  - Abandoned in Death, In Death 54, St. Martin's Press (February 2022)
  - Nightwork, St. Martin's Press (May 2022)
  - Desperation in Death, In Death 55, St. Martin's Press (September 2022)
  - The Choice, The Dragon Heart Legacy, St. Martin's Press (November 2022)
- 2023
  - Encore in Death, In Death 56, St. Martin's Press (February 2023)
  - Identity, St. Martin's Press (May 2023)
  - Payback in Death, In Death 57, St. Martin's Press (June 2023)
  - Inheritance, The Lost Bride Trilogy #1, St. Martin's Press (November 2023)
- 2024
  - Random in Death, In Death 58, St. Martin's Press (January 2024)
  - Mind Games, St. Martin's Press (May 2024)
  - Passions in Death, In Death 59, St. Martin's Press (September 2024)
  - The Mirror, The Lost Bride Trilogy #2, St. Martin's Press (November 2024)
- 2025
  - Bonded in Death, In Death 60, St. Martin's Press (February 2025)
  - Hidden Nature, St. Martin's Press (May 2025)
  - Framed in Death, In Death 61, St. Martin's Press (September 2025)
  - The Seven Rings, The Lost Bride Trilogy #3, St. Martin's Press (November 2025)
- 2026
  - Stolen in Death, In Death 62, St. Martin's Press (February 2026)
  - The Final Target, St. Martin's Press (May 2026)
  - Fury in Death, In Death 63, St. Martin's Press (September 2026)
  - Birth of the Witch, A Coven of Three Trilogy #1, St. Martin's Press (November 2026)

== Non-fiction ==
- "The Romance of Writing" essay in North American Romance Writers (1999, ISBN 0810836041)
