= Bed of roses (disambiguation) =

Bed of roses is an English expression which means an easy and peaceful life.

Bed of Roses may also refer to:

== Film and TV ==
- Bed of Roses (1933 film), a 1933 comedy film that featured Constance Bennett and Pert Kelton
- "Bed of Roses", an episode of Yanks Go Home
- Bed of Roses (1996 film), a 1996 romance film that starred Mary Stuart Masterson and Christian Slater
- Bed of Roses (TV series), a 2008 Australian drama/comedy television series

== Music ==
- "Bed of Roses" (Bon Jovi song), 1993
- "Bed of Roses" (Screaming Trees song), 1991
- "Bed of Rose's", a 1971 song by The Statler Brothers
- "Bed of Roses", a song by Bette Midler from Bette of Roses
- "Bed of Roses", a song by Warrant from Cherry Pie (album)
- "Bed of Roses", a song by Teyana Taylor and Wale from Escape Room (album) (2025)
- "En säng av rosor", a song by Darin

== Other uses ==
- Bed O' Roses, a racehorse
- Bed of Roses (novel), a novel by Nora Roberts
