= Vision in White =

Book by Nora Roberts

- Author: Nora Roberts
- Language: English
- Series: Bride Quartet
- Genre: Contemporary romance
- Publisher: Berkley Books
- Publication date: 2009
- ISBN: 978-0-425-22751-0
- Followed by: Bed of Roses

Vision in White is the first book of the Bride Quartet series of romance novels, written by Nora Roberts. It spent two weeks atop the New York Times Bestseller List and reached number 3 on the USA Today bestseller list, marking the first time one of Roberts' books had become a bestseller in trade paperback format. A downloadable casual-play computer game based on the book was introduced by I-Play in 2010.

In her thirty-year career, Roberts had published almost 200 novels. Vision in White was one of ten Roberts novels published in 2009, including five new releases and five reprints. When it was released on April 28, 2009, its cover premiered the use of a special logo to differentiate her new releases from reprints of her past works.

The novel marked Roberts' return to contemporary romance. The new series revolved around a wedding planning enterprise run by four childhood friends. This first story featured the developing relationship between wedding photographer Mackensie "Mac" Elliot and English professor Carter Maguire. Like several other Roberts novels, Vision in White explored how a protagonist balanced a successful career with a dysfunctional family environment. Although the hero is a fairly typical representation of the romance novel archetype of the professor, the novel is slightly unusual for a romance in that the hero must convince the heroine to take a chance on love.

== Background ==
Nora Roberts is a prolific author of romance and futuristic suspense novels. From 1979 through 2008, almost 200 of her novels were published. On average, she completed a book every 45 days. She does not outline the novels in advance or create character biographies, preferring to develop the plot as she goes.

According to Publishers Weekly, three of the top-ten bestselling mass market paperbacks of 2008 were Roberts novels. Her new releases focused primarily on paranormal and fantasy romance. In 2009, Roberts returned to the traditional contemporary romance subgenre with Vision in White. The novel was the first in her Bride Quartet, which also included Bed of Roses, Savor the Moment, and Happy Ever After. Each novel in the series focuses on the love story of a different founder of Vows, a fictional wedding planning business.

Vision in White was released by Berkley Books on April 28, 2009. The novel was one of ten Roberts books released that year. Five of the releases were paperback reprints of books previously issued. Three were new hardcovers, including two published under the pseudonym J. D. Robb. Vision in White and its sequel, Bed of Roses, were released in trade paperback. To help readers differentiate the new releases from the reprints, the covers of the two trade paperbacks included a medallion with the initials NR.

== Plot summary ==
The novel follows the relationship of photographer Mackensie "Mac" Elliot and English teacher Carter Maguire. Mac and her childhood friends Parker, Emma, and Laurel are the founders of Vows, a fictional wedding planning company in Connecticut. While accompanying his sister to a planning session at Vows, Carter renews his acquaintance with Mac and confesses that he had been infatuated with her since high school. She is intrigued by his honesty and earnestness and decides to embark on a casual fling with him.

After seeing her parents' numerous failed marriages, Mac does not trust the idea of commitment. Her determination to avoid emotional intimacy is reinforced as she struggles against her mother's continued tactics of emotional manipulation.

Their relationship progresses slowly through the book. Each protagonist receives much advice from a large circle of friends and family. With the support of her friends and Carter, Mac develops the courage to stand up to her mother. By the end of the novel, she realizes that she does not have to relive her parents' mistakes, and chooses to embrace her love for Carter.

== Analysis ==
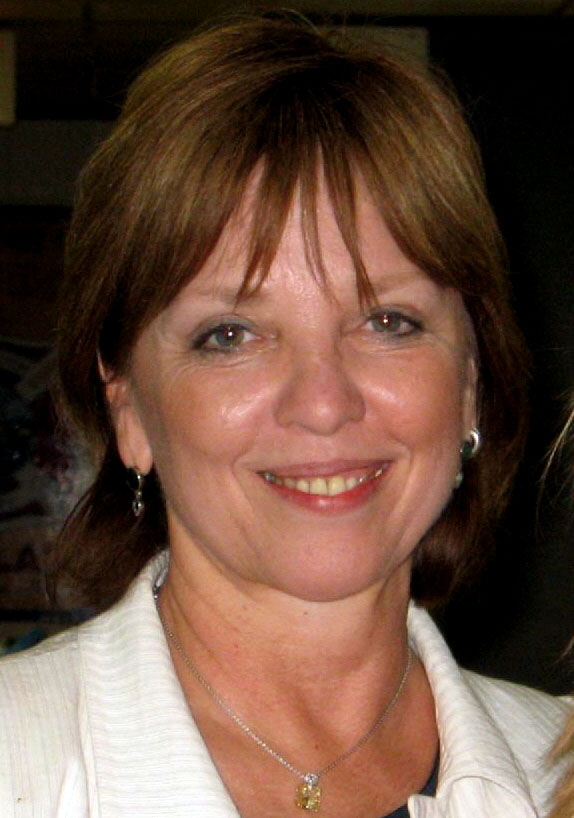
Author Nora Roberts

The four novels of the Bride Quartet share a strong emphasis on sisterhood. The heroines of the books bonded as children and have become sisters by choice. Throughout the series, they provide mutual support and acceptance of each other's quirks. Focused on their careers, the heroines have little time for outside relationships, and they rely heavily on each other for comfort, help, and distractions. A similar theme is seen in several of Roberts' other works; her In Death series, written as J. D. Robb, has a heroine who has created a family from female friends and colleagues.

According to critic Betsy Prioleau, Vision in White's hero is a typical representation of one of the eight archetypes of a romance hero: the professor. Several scenes in the novel show him teaching students or in parent-teacher conferences. Like most intellectual romance heroes, Carter is a "sober good guy", and the heroine is attracted to him primarily for his mind. In an unusual twist for a romance novel, however, the hero is the character who is ready for a commitment but must help the heroine overcome her fears. After seeing her mother divorce four husbands and discard countless boyfriends, Mac prefers to avoid emotional intimacy rather than risk the relationship splintering. Carter provides reassurance that their relationship is built on a solid foundation.

Critic Mary Ellen Snodgrass calls Vision in White a story of the New Woman, with a strong heroine who is extremely proud of her significant career accomplishments. Roberts uses the heroine's choices of how to pose or spotlight her photography clients as pointed ways of celebrating both monogamy and "unconventional views of femininity". In one scene, Mac convinces a heavily pregnant woman to pose nude, despite her feelings of awkwardness; through the resulting photos, the client comes to believe that she is actually beautiful. In another poke at traditional stereotypes, Mac photographs a bride and groom posing together on a horse, evoking the metaphor of a knight coming to rescue the princess—but the couple are equals.

Roberts contrasts Mac's competence in business matters with her difficulties in dealing with an extremely dysfunctional family, a theme Roberts had previously used in the Chesapeake Bay Series (Rising Tides, Sea Swept, and Inner Harbor) and the Calhoun Series. In Visions in White, the family difficulties are caused by the heroine's mother, who is essentially a cross between the mothers in Carolina Moon and Tribute. Roberts shows that, as a result of her family's dysfunction, Mac has chosen to distance herself from deeper emotions. The camera allows Mac to interact with other people's happiness and lives without having to fully participate; as the book progresses, she gradually develops the courage to come out of her shell and fully participate in life.

The use of the wedding industry is, per Snodgrass, "a wry reprise of Roberts' career in fictional matchmaking". The novel celebrates the joy of a traditional wedding ceremony, including the playful ceremonies arranged by children playing dress-up. Roberts' treatment of these themes "validates the dress-up game of playing bride as both fantasy and a stabilizing preface on women's devotion to mate and family". Roberts included significant detail on the wedding planning industry, which Snodgrass posits is meant to highlight and celebrate the success the female characters had at niche marketing.

== Reception ==
Jill M. Smith in Romantic Times gave the novel four out of five stars, labeling it a "wonderful and cozy read". A Publishers Weekly review highlighted the "gentle humor and likable cast" and predicted that readers would be eager to follow the characters through the rest of the series. In Booklist, John Charles called the novel "thoroughly charming" and lauded the deep characterization and "sharp, clever writing." that combined to celebrate "friendship and love".

In a survey of readers, Snodgrass found mixed opinions. Many were delighted to see Roberts return to traditional contemporary romances, minus the elements of fantasy and magic that had woven through her more recent novels. Some praised the tight bonds of sisterhood that Roberts created for the four founders of Vows, but other readers complained that the character voices were too similar. A vocal minority pointed out similarities between this novel and Roberts' Calhoun series.

By February 2010, Vision in White and Bed of Roses had sold a combined 1 million print copies. Over 100,000 copies of Vision in White were sold in Canada alone between May and October 2009. The novel spent 32 weeks on the USA Today bestseller list, peaking at number 3. It was number 1 on the New York Times Bestseller List for trade paperback fiction for two weeks. It was the first of Roberts' novels to be a bestseller in trade paperback format.

== Computer game ==
Within months of the novel's release, computer gaming company I-Play began developing a downloadable casual-play game based on the story. Roberts' input was limited to approval of the graphics and the game's interpretation of the storyline. The game followed the general plot of the novel, from the perspective of the heroine. More than 40 different locations from the book were featured, including Mac's office and Carter's kitchen. There were hidden-object tasks and several mini-games featuring wedding-related activities, such as cake decorating and floral arranging. Roberts was pleased with the final product, remarking that "to have a story translated into a game like this, it's tremendous fun for me. It's my initial vision, but I enjoy seeing how, when you translate it into that other medium, how somebody else's vision manages to affect it but keep the core of the story." The game was released in February 2010. According to Roberts' website, game sales did not match the developer's expectations, and plans for sequels to the game were cancelled.

== Sources ==
- Prioleau, Betsy (2013). Swoon: Great Seducers and Why Women Love Them. W.W. Norton & Company. ISBN 978-0-393-08991-2.
- Snodgrass, Mary Ellen (2010). Reading Nora Roberts. Santa Barbara, CA: Greenwood Press. ISBN 978-0-313-36294-1.
