= Remember When =

Remember When may refer to:

== Music ==
- "Remember When" (Alan Jackson song), 2003
- "Remember When (We Made These Memories)", a 1965 song by Wayne Newton
- "Remember When (Push Rewind)", a 2012 song by Chris Wallace
- "Remember When", a song by Color Me Badd
- "Remember When", a song by Avril Lavigne from Goodbye Lullaby
- "Remember When", a song written by Richard Marx and performed by LeAnn Rimes for Disney's Happiest Homecoming on Earth
- "Remember When" (The Platters song), a 1959 song written by Buck Ram
- Remember When (The Orwells album), 2012
- Remember When: The Anthology, a DVD of live performances by Harry Chapin
- "Remember When" (Bad Wolves song), a song by Bad Wolves on their 2018 album Disobey
- "Remember When", a song by Chevelle from NIRATIAS

== Other media ==
- Remember When?, a 1925 silent short comedy film starring Harry Langdon.
- Remember When..., a 1980s TV series hosted by Dick Cavett
- Remember When, an imprint of the publisher Pen and Sword Books
- Remember When (film), a 1974 film with a screenplay by Herman Raucher
- Remember When: Reflections on a Changing Australia, a 2003 book by Bruce Elder
- Remember When (novel), a 2003 novel by Nora Roberts writing as J.D. Robb
- "Remember When" (The Sopranos), an episode of The Sopranos
- Remember When (radio program), a defunct Philippine radio music program
- "Remember When...", an episode of the TV series Pocoyo

== See also ==
- "Remember Then", a 1962 song first recorded by The Earls, originally written as "Remember When"
- Nostalgia
