= Bed of roses =

English-language expression for a carefree life

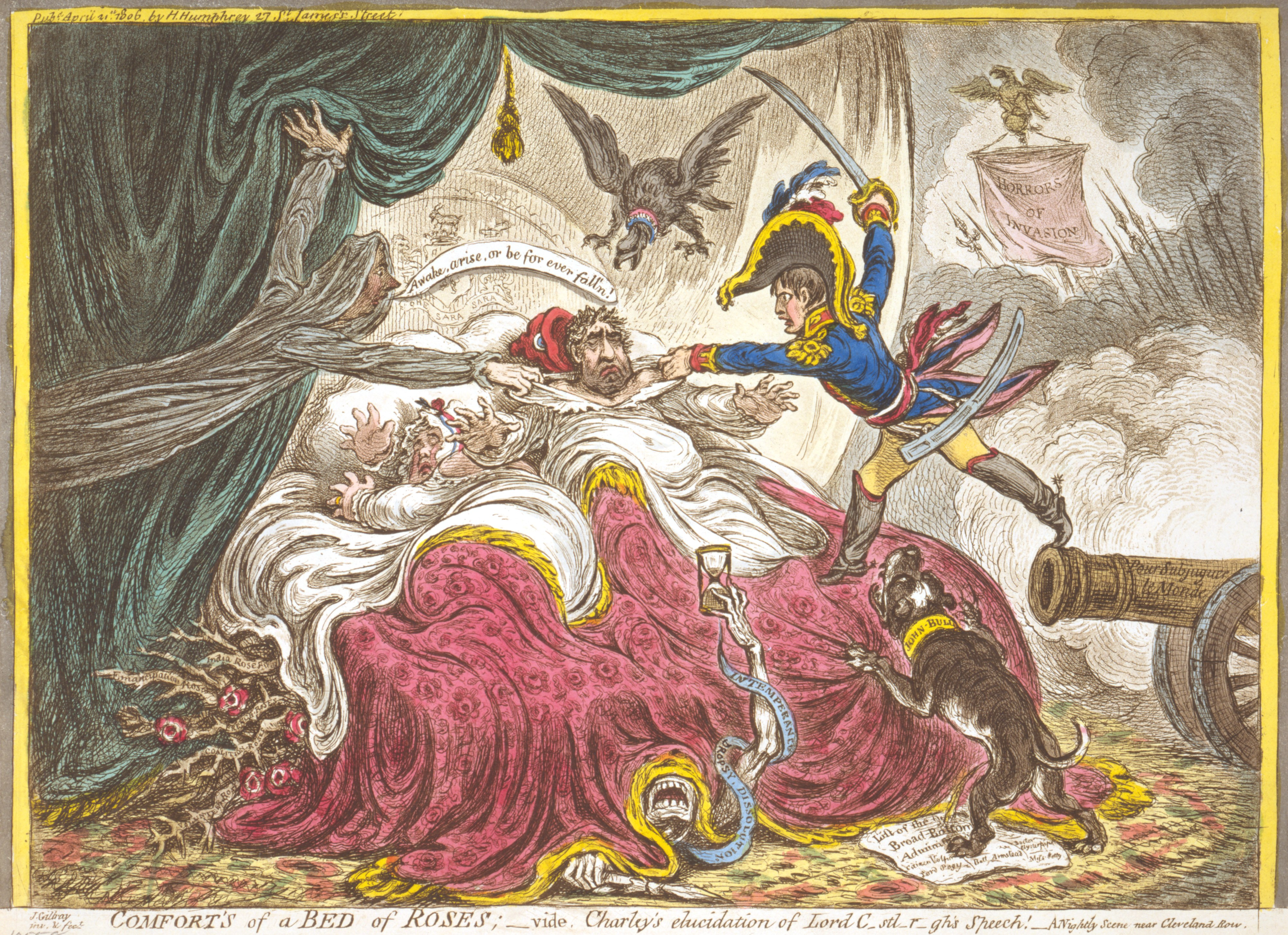
- In Comforts of a Bed of Roses (1806), James Gillray caricatured Charles James Fox in the last few months of his life, which were neither easy nor peaceful.
- Meaning: A carefree life

Bed of roses is an English expression that represents a carefree life. This idiomatic expression is still popular.

In the thirteenth-century work Le Roman de la Rose (called "The French Iliad" in Brewer's Dictionary of Phrase and Fable), a Lover recounts his dream of touring a garden and finding a beautiful bed of roses by the Fountain of Love.

The expression is also used by later poets. Here is a line in Christopher Marlowe's poem The Passionate Shepherd to His Love. This was published posthumously in 1599; Marlowe died in 1593, stabbed to death

And I will make thee beds of roses

And a thousand fragrant posies,
A cap of flowers, and a kirtle

Embroidered all with leaves of myrtle;

== In popular culture ==
- Bed of Roses (1996 film)—A 1996 romance film
- "Bed of Roses"—A 1989 Mondo Rock (Ross Wilson) song
- "Bed of Roses"—A 1993 Bon Jovi song
- "Bed of Rose's"—A 1971 Statler Brothers song
- Bed of Roses (1933 film)—A 1933 comedy film
- "Bed of Roses"—A song by Mindless Self Indulgence
- Bed of Roses (TV series)—An Australian television drama series
- "A Bed of Roses", a poem by Patti Smith from her 1996 book The Coral Sea
- A single by 1990s Grunge band Screaming Trees from the 1991 Studio album Uncle Anesthesia.
- Bed of Roses - a 2009 book, author Nora Roberts
