= Remember When (novel) =

2003 novel by J. D. Robb

- First edition
- Author: Nora Roberts / J. D. Robb
- Language: English
- Series: in Death
- Genre: Crime novel
- Publisher: Putnam
- Publication date: September 2003
- Publication place: United States
- Media type: Print (Hardcover, Paperback)
- Pages: 483 pp
- ISBN: 978-0-425-19547-5
- OCLC: 55108363
- Preceded by: Imitation in Death
- Followed by: Divided in Death

Remember When (2003) is a novel by American writer Nora Roberts, writing under her name and her pseudonym, J. D. Robb. The second half of the book is part of the In Death series, taking place between Imitation in Death and Divided in Death. The plot follows a diamond robbery, over a span of 56 years.

== Summary ==
=== Part 1: Hot Rocks ===
Laine Tavish runs an antique shop called Remember When, and spends her time trying to forget her father Jack O'Hara. O'Hara is a career thief, and although Laine loves her father, she wants nothing to do with him. Unfortunately, when her father's best friend is killed in front of Remember When, Laine cannot help but get involved. Her father's friend was not the only one who has tracked her down, and before he died, he tells Laine, "Hide the Pooch".

A private investigator, Max Gannon, catches up with Laine and reveals that Jack, his best friend Willie Young, a man named Alex Crew, and an inside man stole 28 million dollars' worth of diamonds, and divided them into four shares. But Alex Crew has decided he wanted all of the diamonds, and has already killed two of them, and taken one of the other shares. Two are still out there, and Crew will kill Laine, Max, and Jack, to get his hands on them.

=== Part 2: Big Jack ===
Samantha Gannon is the granddaughter of Laine and Max, and the great-granddaughter of Jack O'Hara. Samantha has written a book on the diamond robbery, in which she reveals that 1/4 of the diamonds were never recovered, and $7 million are still hidden somewhere. One evening, Samantha returns home to find her roommate, Andrea Jacobs, dead, slashed across the throat. Lt. Eve Dallas is brought into the investigation, and soon it becomes apparent that the murders are connected to the diamond robbery.

With the help of her billionaire husband Roarke, and new detective partner Peabody, Eve is on the trail of the last relative of Alex Crew. Trevor Whitter is his grandson, and obsessed with the missing diamonds. Convinced Samantha knows where they are, he will do any thing to get her. Once he finds the diamonds, he will kill her too.

The diamonds will make another appearance in Memory in Death, as a Christmas present to Eve, from Roarke.
