= Naked in Death =

1995 novel by J. D. Robb

- First edition
- Author: J.D. Robb
- Language: English
- Series: in Death series
- Genre: Detective fiction
- Publisher: Berkley Books
- Publication date: July 28, 1995
- Publication place: United States
- Media type: Print (Hardcover, Paperback) e-Book (Kindle); Audio Book (CD)
- Pages: 314 (paperback); 294 (hardcover)
- ISBN: 978-0-425-14829-7
- Followed by: Glory in Death

Naked in Death (1995) is the first book of the In Death series by J. D. Robb, preceding Glory in Death. This book originally had a cover flat produced for it with the name "D. J. MacGregor", but was changed later.

== Plot introduction ==
New York Police and Security Department detective Lieutenant Eve Dallas's main suspect in the death of a high-profile prostitute is the enigmatic Irish businessman, Roarke, in 2058.

== Plot summary ==
In 2058, Eve Dallas, Lieutenant in the NYPSD (New York Police and Security Department) Homicide division, is tasked with finding the culprit who killed Sharon DeBlass, a licensed companion (that is, a legal prostitute) and granddaughter to Senator DeBlass of the Conservative Party. As she investigates DeBlass's murder, more prostitutes are slain, setting up a pattern that involves antique (and illegal) firearms and video discs of the murder being sent to Lt. Dallas. Signs initially point to the wealthy Roarke, since DeBlass had had an evening appointment with him and Roarke is a collector of the type of antique firearm used in her murder (Smith & Wesson Model 10), but Eve rules him out as a suspect and begins a passionate love affair with him.

With the assistance of Dr. Charlotte Mira, Eve develops a psychological profile of the killer: someone who thinks poorly of women and gets pleasure from the sexual power of using them and killing them after. To her disgust, the Chief of Police, Simpson, orders Eve to lie in the press conference and say that DeBlass's death was likely an accident and not linked with any other murders. She then follows a hunch and gets help from Roarke in illegally accessing Simpson's finances, discovering enormous donations from DeBlass and unreported millions of dollars in overseas accounts. She then leaks this information to the press, effectively ridding herself of any interference from the Chief.

Eve uncovers an incestual affair between Sharon DeBlass and her grandfather the Senator. Sharon was blackmailing him, making him pay her to keep quiet about the childhood molestation of both Sharon and her aunt, but also sleeping with him. Eve flies with Roarke to Washington, D.C., and arrests the senator on the Senate floor for all three murders just as he is publicly speaking in favor of a "Morality Bill" that will again outlaw prostitution and legalize firearms. On the plane flight back, she admits to Roarke that her father raped her repeatedly as a child and that she does not remember anything beyond being found at age eight in Dallas.

Eve then comes home to find Senator DeBlass's assistant, Rockman, in her apartment planning to make her the fourth victim. As he explains that the senator (who has now committed suicide) killed Sharon in a moment of passion and then allowed Rockman to commit the other murders to lead investigators astray, Eve secretly transmits the conversation to the other detective on the case, Captain Ryan Feeney. A cat that Eve had taken from one of the victims distracts Rockman, giving Eve a chance to fight back long enough for Roarke and the police to arrive, ending with Rockman's arrest.

== Characters in "Naked in Death" ==
This book introduces the following characters.

- Lt. Eve Dallas – protagonist, homicide investigator
- Roarke – Eve's love interest
- Captain Ryan Feeney – Eve's former partner and trainer
- Commander Jack Whitney – Eve's boss
- Dr. Charlotte Mira – NYPSD's psychiatrist
- Mavis Freestone – Eve's best friend, singer
- Summerset – Roarke's butler
- Nadine Furst – Channel 75 Crime reporter
- Charles Monroe – Licensed companion, neighbor of first victim
- Galahad – Eve's cat, which she acquires from victim No. 3
- Richard and Elizabeth DeBlass – parents of the first victim and friends of Roarke

== Release details ==
- Berkley mass market, July 1995, ISBN 0-425-14829-7
- BrillianceAudio (Abridged), Dec 2000, ISBN 1-58788-195-0
- Thorndike Press large print, March 2000, ISBN 0-7862-2415-0
- Nova Audio (Abridged), Jan 2001, ISBN 1-58788-080-6
- e-book, Berkley, Feb 2002, ISBN 0-7865-2232-1
- Adobe Reader e-book, Berkley, Feb 2002, ISBN 0-7865-2233-X
- Putnam hardcover, March 2004, ISBN 0-399-15157-5
- Turn The Page Bookstore exclusive limited edition hardcover reissue (Special Markets Hardcover), December 2014, ISBN 978-0-425-28158-1
