= Purity in Death =

2002 novel by J. D. Robb

- Author: J. D. Robb
- Language: English
- Series: in Death
- Genre: Crime novel
- Publisher: The Penguin Group
- Publication date: September 2002
- Publication place: United States
- Media type: Print (Hardcover, Paperback)
- Pages: 355 pp (paperback)
- ISBN: 978-0-425-18630-5
- Preceded by: Reunion in Death
- Followed by: Portrait in Death

Purity in Death (2002) is a novel by American writer J. D. Robb. It is the fifteenth novel in the In Death series, preceding Portrait in Death.

== Plot summary ==
Lt. Eve Dallas and her assistant, Delia Peabody, are called in by Officer Troy Trueheart after he has shot and killed a suspect named Louie Cogburn. The man, a known but unconvicted, normally low-profile dealer in "illegals" (illegal drugs) to children, had suddenly turned homicidally insane and killed a neighbor in his apartment building; he was attacking the neighbor's wife when Trueheart enters the scene. Trueheart is forced to stun Cogburn when he attacks the officer; however, despite Trueheart's weapon being locked on a normal stun setting, Cogburn dies instantly.

On examining the scene, Eve finds the attacker's computer bears a message on its screen: "Absolute Purity Achieved." She sends the computer to NYPSD's Electronics Detection Division for examination. The attacker's autopsy, meanwhile, shows an unusual extreme swelling of the brain tissue, enough to induce irreversible dementia and violence. Some time later, the EDD investigator working on Cogburn's computer turns violently enraged, injures Ian McNab, and then dies of the same intense brain swelling while holding Captain Feeney hostage.

The next day, another body is found, that of Chadwick Fitzhugh, an unconvicted pedophile, with the same swelling and evidence of the same uncontrollable violence, and with the same message on his computer terminal. Following this, a text message is sent to reporter Nadine Furst from a group calling themselves the "Purity Seekers," claiming responsibility for the deaths of Cogburn and Fitzhugh, and promising more "executions" of criminals that the law has not been able to touch, by means of a unique computer virus. It becomes Eve's job, with the help of Roarke and her team, to stop the Purity Seekers before more are killed by them, as well as more deaths of uninvolved individuals.
