= Betsy Prioleau =

American author

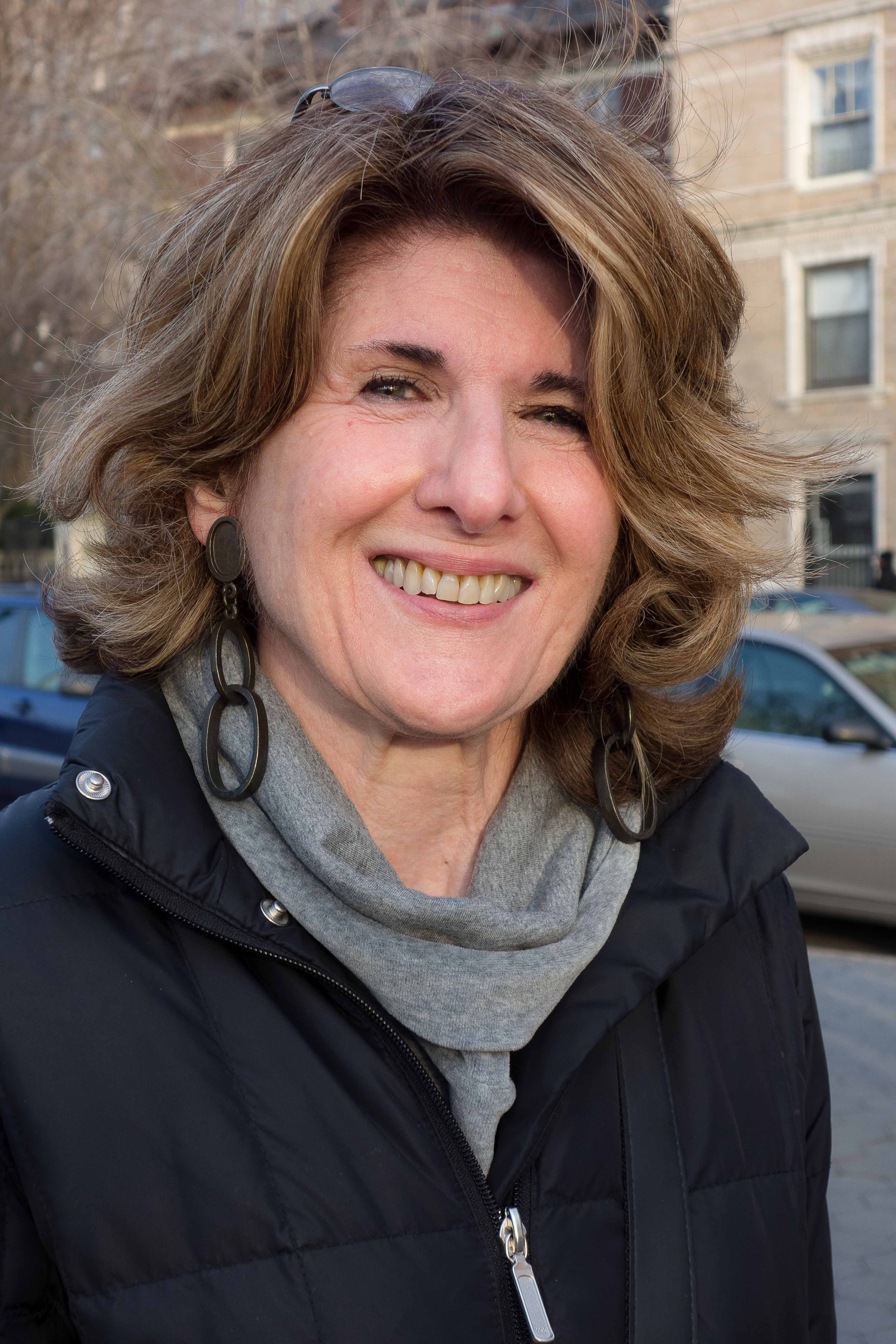
- Education: University of Virginia; Duke University
- Occupation: Author
- Writing career
- Language: English
- Genres: Cultural history, Nineteenth-Century literature and history, Feminism, seduction
- Website: www.betsyprioleau.com

Betsy Prioleau is an American author and cultural historian. Prioleau's books include Swoon: Great Seducers and Why Women Love Them and Seductress: Women Who Ravished the World and Their Lost Art of Love, and Diamonds and Deadlines: A Tale of Greed, Deceit, and A Female Tycoon in the Gilded Age.

== Early life and education ==
Prioleau was born and raised in Richmond, Virginia. She graduated from the University of Virginia with a B.S. and M.A. in English and received a PhD in American literature at Duke University.

== Career ==
After completing her PhD, she taught English and world literature at Manhattan College. She then taught cultural history at New York University Liberal Studies Program. Prioleau regularly appears on radio shows as an expert on seduction and related topics. She was the co-host of Errol Gluck's podcast, GluckRadio, from 2013 to 2014 until she left the show to pursue a writing project.

== Books ==
Prioleau has written essays, scholarly articles, and four books. Prioleau's first book was titled Circle of Eros: Sexuality in the Work of William Dean Howells. In 2003, she wrote Seductress: Women Who Ravished the World and Their Lost Art of Love, and in 2013, Swoon: Great Seducers and Why Women Love Them. Her latest book is titled Diamonds and Deadlines: A Tale of Greed, Deceit, and a Female Tycoon in the Gilded Age, 2022.

=== The Circle of Eros ===
The Circle of Eros: Sexuality in the Work of William Dean Howells is a study of the nineteenth-century American author and editor William Dean Howells. The book discusses the sexual themes in his novels, essays, and autobiographies, and shows how he arrived at a positive view of erotic love.

=== Seductress ===
Prioleau published Seductress: Women Who Ravished the World and Their Lost Art of Love in 2003. The book re-examines seductresses, refutes the negative stereotypes, and portrays the lives of such women as Cleopatra, Lola Montez, and Mae West as well as modern women. The book also gives romantic advice to women.

The book received positive reviews. Publishers Weekly wrote that "whether one buys her argument or not, [Seductress is] wildly engaging reading and faultless scholarship. The New York Times wrote that "in this glossy, steam-heated analysis of temptresses and their tactics, no historical chapter is too obscure to provide inspiration."

=== Swoon ===
Swoon: Great Seducers and Why Women Love Them is a non-fiction book which analyses what makes a man attractive to women. Prioleau uses biographies, fiction, and science to discuss the secrets of men throughout the history and today that make them great lovers. On the whole, the book was well received. Jonathan Yardley reviewed the book negatively and wrote that it is "a breezy, once-over-lightly book about sex." Library Journal wrote that, "with exceptional vocabulary and bright prose, Prioleau offers a thoroughly researched, irresistible look at the characteristics of historical and contemporary seducers." Kirkus Reviews called the book, "A fun, frothy complement to cultural historian Prioleau's Seductress: Women Who Ravished the World."

=== Diamonds and Deadlines ===
Diamonds and Deadlines: A Tale of Greed, Deceit, and a Female Tycoon in the Gilded Age is a biography of Mrs. Frank Leslie, the first publishing titan in America and cultural history of the seismic, momentous postbellum years. Prioleau draws from letters and historical sources to reveal the unknown, sensational life of Miriam Leslie, the “Empress of Journalism” who ran the Frank Leslie company for twenty years. A century ahead of her time, she left her multimillion- dollar estate to women's suffrage, a never-equaled amount that guaranteed passage of the Nineteenth Amendment.

Pre-publication reviews have been positive: “They just don’t make characters like this anymore. Kudos to Prioleau for her gallant historical rescue mission.” Kirkus Reviews [December 9, 2021]. "Prioleau brings enjoyable gusto to this biography of Mrs. Frank Leslie. Her story sparkles, as intoxicating as a champagne fountain that someone else is paying for." NYT Editor's Choice. Also the WSJ "Noteworthy Book."

== Bibliography ==
- The Circle of Eros: Sexuality in the Work of William Dean Howells (1983) ISBN 0-8223-0492-9
- Seductress: Women Who Ravished the World and Their Lost Art of Love (2003) ISBN 0-670-03166-6
- Swoon: Great Seducers and Why Women Love Them (2013) ISBN 978-0-393-06837-5
- Diamonds and Deadlines: A Tale of Greed, Deceit, and a Female Tycoon in the Gilded Age (2022) ISBN 978-1-4683-1450-2

== Personal life ==
She is married to Philip Prioleau, a retired dermatologist.
