= Loyalty in Death =

1999 novel by J. D. Robb

- First edition
- Author: J. D. Robb
- Language: English
- Series: in Death
- Genre: Crime novel
- Publisher: Berkley Books
- Publication date: October 1999
- Publication place: United States
- Media type: Print (Hardcover, Paperback)
- Pages: 358 pp
- ISBN: 0-425-17140-X
- OCLC: 42633322
- LC Class: CPB Box no. 1801 vol. 17
- Preceded by: Conspiracy in Death
- Followed by: Witness in Death

Loyalty in Death (1999) is a novel by J. D. Robb. It is the tenth novel in the In Death series, preceded by Conspiracy in Death and preceding Witness in Death. It is the first book in the series to deal with issues of terrorism and large scale homicide.

== Plot summary ==
Lt. Eve Dallas and her assistant Delia Peabody, are called to the home of millionaire, J. Clarence Branson, the owner and co-president of Branson Toys and Tools, by Lisbeth Cook, Branson's long-time girlfriend. There they find that Lisbeth has murdered Branson with a drill produced by his own company. Coolly, she comments on the reliability of the drill, and explains that she killed him because he was cheating on her. Further investigation reveals that J. Clarence was considered by his friends and family to be a good man, with simple pleasures and honest feelings for Lisbeth, making him unlikely to have cheated on her. With Cook safely in custody, Dallas and Peabody are called to see a man named Ratso, who tells them he has good information to sell.

Ratso tells them about a man named Fixer, who was beaten and drowned in the river. Fixer was, as his name suggests, a skilled mechanic of underworld gadgets, and had apparently told Ratso that he had a good assignment, building bombs for an unknown group of people. This cabal, wanting to cover their trial, had (according to Ratso) eliminated Fixer. Eve agrees to look at the file as soon as she has time. Dallas and Peabody finally arrange to have Cook booked, although Eve explains to Peabody that the PA will almost certainly accept a plea bargain of Manslaughter. Eve heads home, where she sets forth the details of the case to her billionaire husband, Roarke.

The next day, Dallas discovers that the PA has, indeed, accepted a plea of man two, much to her disgust. At this point, Zeke Peabody, Delia's younger brother arrives from the country unexpectedly and Dallas gives Delia time off to get Zeke settled. Zeke ends up staying with Peabody for a while.

Dallas questions B. Donald Branson, Clarence's brother, and Clarissa Branson, Donald's wife. They both claim Clarence was faithful, leaving Eve with nothing. Meanwhile, Peabody shows her brother her small apartment, while he reveals that he is considering a relationship with a married woman. Peabody is shocked, when Zeke reveals that not only is this woman his employer, but that his employers are none other than the B. Donald and Clarissa Branson.

Dallas heads to Fixer's shop to find it picked nearly clean. She does discover a custom built gun rack of Fixer's, and believes it would hold a hold a highly illegal army blaster. She goes to Roarke, who confirms her suspicion. Later, Dallas and Roarke attend the reading of JC Branson's will, but little to nothing is gained however, as all the significant beneficiaries already had money, leaving them without motive for the murder.

At the office the next morning, Dallas is greeted by Peabody, who hands over a text disc addressed to the Lt. The disc is from a group calling themselves Cassandra, named after the seeress of Greek legend, and claiming they will "bring punishment to the city", and promising to give a demonstration of their power at 9:15 that morning. At 9:15, a bomb explodes, destroying an empty warehouse owned by Cassandra's main target, Roarke. Meanwhile, Zeke discovers that Mrs. Branson is being abused by her husband, and they end up making plans to run away together. However, everything goes wrong and Zeke ends up killing Branson and dumping the body in the river.

Peabody, having hooked up with an electronics detective named McNab (with whom she has a long-standing antagonistic relationship and with whom she ends up moving in together later in the series), gets a call from Zeke who admits everything. Peabody contacts Eve, who pulls strings to get the case. Roarke, also on scene, calms Peabody and hires lawyers for Zeke. The following morning Eve receives another disc, this one containing a promise of an explosion at one of Roarke's theatres. With the advanced warning, they manage to diffuse all the bombs but there was another bomb planted at The Plaza, also owned by Roarke. Huge loss of human life ensues leaving Eve, and her friend from the bomb squad, shaken. Eve's friend is later revealed to be pregnant.

When Eve goes to delivery the extortion money demanded by Cassandra (and hopefully lay a trap for them) a similar blast takes place at the railway station serving as the drop point. Eve's plan of catching any member flops as the group sends droids instead of people and although the police are successful in evacuating the area, Eve's friend gets killed in the blast, leaving Eve devastated. Roarke calms her, promising to send monetary aid to the families of the deceased.

Meanwhile, Mrs. Branson runs away leaving Zeke confused. When Eve searches her apartment, she discovers that rather than an abused wife, Clarissa Branson is the head of Cassandra. Roarke breaks through her security and discovers that the group's ultimate target is to blow up the Statue of liberty. It is also revealed that Zeke never killed Mr. Branson, but rather a droid copy, and the entire thing was staged in an attempt to keep Eve distracted from the Cassandra case. Eve, with help from Roarke, goes to the Statue of Liberty and successfully saves the structure. Mrs. Branson, thwarted, jumps off the landmark to her death.

== Anachronisms ==
The book is set c.2060 and, at one point in the story, the Twin Towers are referred to as being a possible terrorist target. As the book was written in 1999, the author had no way of knowing that the Towers would be destroyed in a terrorist attack a couple of years later and, as such, would not be standing in 2060.
