= Glory in Death =

1995 novel by J. D. Robb

First edition (publ. Berkley Books)

Glory in Death is the second book of the In Death series by J. D. Robb, following Naked in Death and preceding Immortal in Death.

== Plot ==
Eve finds the body of Prosecuting Attorney Cicely Towers on the night of May 2, running into C.J. Morse, a reporter she holds in very low regard. She returns to Cop Central to find that Commander Whitney was very good friends with Towers, having started out together when they were very young. Considering Eve to be the best investigator he has, he pulled strings to ensure that she be primary on the investigation. Another victim, actress Yvonne Metcalf, is found. Morse is already on the scene, filming the woman's dead body. He snidely informs Eve that Metcalf used to have a relationship with Eve's partner Roarke.

Eve tells Roarke that the killer is stalking famous women. He is unhappy to find that Eve has decided to capitalize on this by becoming bait. Nadine promises to help this by delivering as much media attention as possible, but the scheme backfires, leading to the death of Nadine's assistant, who was mistaken for Nadine due to wearing her raincoat. Roarke, who has to leave on another business trip, surprises Eve with her own suite of the house, which he has converted (partly with furniture from her apartment) into her own home office, adjoining his.

During the investigation Eve finds grounds to arrest David, Cicily Towers son, and while searching his residence, finds a knife that she suspects was used in the murders. This causes Marco, David's father and Cicely's ex-husband, to confess to the murders to protect his son. Eve and Roarke have a night in Mexico; on their return, Eve finds that the lab has tested David's knife as being negative for the murder weapon. The new police chief, Harrison Tibble, tells her to release David and Marco for lack of evidence. He adds that there is too much emotion involved in this case, lightly censuring both her and Whitney. Afterwards, Eve finds out that Nadine is missing, and manages to tie Morse to the crimes, finding sufficient evidence in his home to prove that he is the killer.

During a party that evening Eve is contacted by Morse, and told to come to meet him otherwise Nadine would be killed. Eve arrives, and while managing to gain the upper hand briefly and release Nadine, ends up in hand to hand combat with Morse. During the fight with Morse, Eve miscalculates and gives him the upper hand. Before he can kill her, Roarke intervenes and saves her, and the knife instead stabs Morse in the throat. (It is not clear whether or not this was accidental or intentional on Roarke's part.) Roarke proposes to Eve as they walk away from the scene.

== Characters in "Glory in Death" ==
This book introduces:

- Officer Delia Peabody, eventual aide and partner
- Crack, owner of the Down and Dirty club
- Police Chief Harrison Tibble, boss of Eve's boss Commander Jack Whitney

== Publication history ==
- Berkley mass market, 1995, ISBN 0-425-15098-4
- Recorded Books (Unabridged), December 1995, ISBN 0-7887-4374-0
- Nova Audio (Abridged), April 2001, ISBN 1-58788-100-4
- Brilliance Audio, April 2001, ISBN 1-58788-197-7
- Adobe Reader e-book, Berkley, June 2001, ISBN 0-7865-0713-6
- e-book, Berkley, June 2001, ISBN 0-7865-0600-8
- Gemstar e-book, Berkley, January 2002, ISBN 0-7865-2018-3
- Putnam hardcover, October 2004, ISBN 0-399-15158-3
