= Conspiracy in Death =

1999 novel by J. D. Robb

- Author: J. D. Robb
- Language: English
- Series: in Death
- Genre: Crime
- Publisher: Berkley Books
- Publication date: April 1999
- Publication place: United States
- Media type: Print (hardback & paperback)
- Pages: 372 pp
- ISBN: 0-425-16813-1
- OCLC: 40932065
- LC Class: CPB Box no. 1800 vol. 6
- Preceded by: Holiday in Death
- Followed by: Loyalty in Death

Conspiracy in Death (1999) is a novel by American writer J. D. Robb. It is the eighth novel in the In Death series, preceding Loyalty in Death.

== Plot summary ==
Lt. Eve Dallas and her assistant, Delia Peabody, are called to a crime scene by Officer Ellen Bowers and Officer Troy Trueheart. A homeless man is killed, and his heart is removed with the skill of a surgeon. Dallas and Peabody both know a serial killer is preying on the city sidewalk sleepers. All of the city's resources, including Eve's billionaire husband Roarke, give her no solid leads, except a free clinic run by a noble and an honest doctor, Dr. Louise Dimatto. Soon though, three are dead, and Eve is running out of time.

Unfortunately for Eve, trouble is also coming from within the police force. Officer Ellen Bowers is deranged and obsessed with Eve. She obsessively writes a journal about all the terrible things that she believes Eve has done. One night, going home to her apartment, still obsessing, Bowers is attacked and killed.

The blame is quickly placed on Eve, who is stripped of her badge and goes into a deep depression. Only her husband Roarke can bring her back and help her figure out why four people are dead and what the terrible jealousy was that motivated these murders.
