= Bed of Roses (novel) =

2009 novel by Nora Roberts

- First edition
- Author: Nora Roberts
- Language: English
- Series: Bride Quartet
- Genre: Fiction
- Publisher: Berkley Books
- Publication date: 2009
- ISBN: 978-0-425-23007-7
- Preceded by: Vision in White
- Followed by: Savor the Moment

Bed of Roses is the second book of the Bride Quartet series, written by Nora Roberts. It focuses around the character of florist Emmaline "Emma" Grant.

== Background ==
Nora Roberts is a prolific author of romance and futuristic suspense novels. From 1979 through 2008, almost 200 of her novels were published. On average, she completes a book every 45 days. She does not outline the novels in advance or create character biographies, preferring to develop the plot as she goes.

According to Publishers Weekly, three of the top-ten bestselling mass market paperbacks of 2008 were Roberts novels. Her new releases focused primarily on paranormal and fantasy romance. In 2009, Roberts returned to the traditional contemporary romance subgenre with Vision in White. The novel was the first in her Bride Quartet, of which Bed of Roses was the second. Later sequels were Savor the Moment, and Happy Ever After. Each novel in the series focuses on the love story of a different founder of Vows, a fictional wedding planning business.

Bed of Roses was released by Berkeley on October 27, 2009, one of ten Roberts books released that year. Five of the releases were paperback reprints of books previously issued. Three were new hardcovers, including two published under the pseudonym J.D. Robb. Vision in White and Bed of Roses, were released in trade paperback. To help readers differentiate the new releases from the reprints, the covers of the two trade paperbacks included a medallion with the initials NR. The story was also made in England

== Plot summary ==
The novel follows the relationship of florist Emmaline "Emma" Grant and architect Jackson "Jack" Cooke. Emma, along with her childhood friends Parker, Mackenzie, and Laurel are the founders of Vows, a fictional wedding planning company in Connecticut. Jack is the childhood friend of Parker's brother. Bound by deep bonds of friendship, the six of them consider themselves family.

Emma and Jack have long been attracted to each other, but refrained from acting on those urges for fear of disrupting their friendship and that of the group in general. When they finally share their first kiss, it is obvious to both of them that they will no longer be able to fight the attraction. They agree to a fling and promise to remain friends when it has run its course.

As the story progresses, Emma falls in love and begins to take on more of a "girlfriend" role. Jack, always more wary of commitment, resists her overtures and wants to keep their relationship less serious. They eventually work through their conflict and Jack admits that he wants a future with Emma.

== Analysis ==
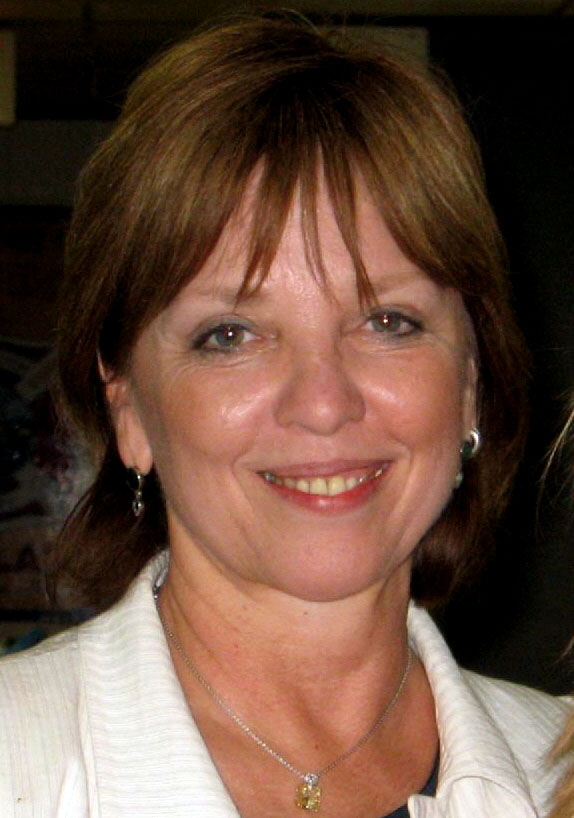
author Nora Roberts

The four novels of the Bride Quartet share a strong emphasis on sisterhood. The heroines of the books bonded as children and have become sisters by choice. Throughout the series, they provide mutual support and acceptance of each other's quirks. The emphasis on their careers and building their business means the heroines have little time for outside relationships, and they rely heavily on each other for comfort, help, and distractions. A similar theme is seen in several of Roberts' other works; her In Death series, written as J.D. Robb, has a heroine who has created a family from female friends and colleagues.

Reviewer Jill M. Smith noted that the series allows Roberts to delve into how relationships can change over time.

== Reception ==
A review in Publishers Weekly described the plot as fairly predictable, but praised Roberts' "effortless wit". In Romantic Times, reviewer Jill Smith gave the novel 4 stars and also highlighted Roberts' humor.

By February 2010, Vision In White and Bed of Roses had sold a combined 1 million print copies.

The first novel of the series, Vision in White, had been the inspiration for a downloadable casual-play computer game. Computer gaming company I-Play had planned a sequel to the game, using Bed of Roses as the inspiration. According to Roberts' website, game sales did not match the developer's expectations, and plans for sequels to the game were cancelled.

== Sources ==
- Snodgrass, Mary Ellen (2010), Reading Nora Roberts, Santa Barbara, CA: Greenwood Press, ISBN 978-0313362941
