= Origin in Death =

2005 novel by J. D. Robb

- First edition
- Author: J. D. Robb
- Language: English
- Series: in Death
- Genre: Crime novel
- Publisher: The Penguin Group
- Publication date: July 2005
- Publication place: United States
- Media type: Print (Hardcover, Paperback)
- Pages: 347 pp
- ISBN: 978-0-7499-3583-2
- OCLC: 59353530
- Preceded by: Survivor in Death
- Followed by: Memory in Death

Origin in Death (2005) is a novel by American writer J. D. Robb, a pseudonym for Nora Roberts. It is the twenty-second novel in the In Death series, preceding Memory in Death.

== Plot summary ==
The story begins when Lt. Eve Dallas and Detective Delia Peabody are called to the murder scene of Dr. Wilfred B. Icove Sr. When they arrive, they are already confused by the circumstances surrounding his death. Dr. Icove was renowned as a genius of cosmetic and reconstructive surgery, and there was nobody benefiting his death, not even his son, Wilfred Icove Jr., thus that was ruled out as a motive. What they find even stranger are that the security disks reveal that a woman (with initials DNA) walking into Icove's office, killing him with a single stab to the heart before leaving.

When Dr. Icove Jr. is killed in the same way, Eve begins looking for another mystery woman, while her husband Roarke begins investigating an organization run by the Icoves and their partner, Dr. Jonah Wilson. Soon, they uncover a secret world inside a private school of young girls and women, created by the Icoves and Wilson. A world of children by design, where people aren't born, but cloned.
