= Portrait in Death =

2003 novel by J. D. Robb

- First edition
- Author: J. D. Robb
- Language: English
- Series: in Death
- Genre: Crime novel
- Publisher: Berkley Books
- Publication date: 2003
- Publication place: United States
- Media type: Print (Hardcover, Paperback)
- Pages: 347 pp (paperback)
- ISBN: 978-0-425-18903-0 (paperback)
- Preceded by: Purity in Death
- Followed by: Imitation in Death

Portrait in Death (2003) is a novel by J. D. Robb, a pseudonym for American writer Nora Roberts. It is the sixteenth novel in the In Death series.

== Plot summary ==
Lt. Eve Dallas is celebrating the shortly-to-start vacation of Summerset, Roarke's majordomo, when he trips over the cat and falls down the stairs, breaking his leg. As Eve and Roarke are giving him first aid, Eve is tipped by Nadine Furst to a location that turns out to contain a dead body stuffed into a recycle bin. Nadine was sent a set of candid images of the victim, a young, pretty woman, and a final image of her dead body, clearly posed in a formal portrait setting. Also included: a note indicating plainly that the woman is the first victim, with more to follow.

Eve assembles her usual team, including Roarke, to track down the killer before he can strike again. However, while taking some time to tend to affairs at Dochas, the shelter that he funds as a charitable project, Roarke meets with a new employee, a social worker, who informs him that she used to live in Dublin at the same time that he was a baby, and that she had given shelter to Roarke and his mother—a different woman than the abusive person that he grew up calling his mother. Roarke's researches show that the social worker is probably correct, and that his father Patrick Roarke killed his mother when she tried to leave him. Roarke is upset over this turn of events and is reluctant to share his feelings with anyone. Eventually, Eve gets him to talk to her desiring to help him through the nightmare of pain. The next day, Roarke hurries off to Ireland to find explanations from the surviving associates of his late, criminal father while Eve is busy investigating the second victim.

He learns about his mother's surviving twin sister Sinead and visits her in Ireland where Eve joins him. Together they head back to New York where Eve is called to report to the crime scene of the third victim, who is the sister of Crack, one of Eve's acquaintances.

Eve traces the evidence found in the van to kidnap the victims and finally determines that Gerald Stevenson, a sociopath who is affected by his mother's death, is the perpetrator. She assigns Detective Baxter and Officer Trueheart to surveil the pub the killer frequents. They believe Stevenson is not going to show up and decide to call it a day when Trueheart is kidnapped.

The story ends with Eve and the team capturing Stevenson a.k.a. Steve Audrey and rescuing Trueheart. Eve rejoices when she learns that Summerset is finally gone on vacation.
