= Promises in Death =

2009 novel by J. D. Robb

- First edition (h/b)
- Author: J. D. Robb
- Series: in Death
- Genre: Crime novel
- Publisher: Putnam
- Publication date: February 2009
- Publication place: United States
- Media type: Print (Hardcover, Paperback)
- Pages: 338 pp (paperback)
- ISBN: 978-0-399-15548-2
- Preceded by: Salvation in Death
- Followed by: Kindred in Death

Promises in Death (2009) is a novel by J. D. Robb, a pseudonym for American writer Nora Roberts. It is the 28th novel in the In Death series.

== Plot summary ==
On being called in to investigate a dead body, NYPSD homicide detectives Eve Dallas and Delia Peabody discover that the woman is a fellow officer, Detective Amaryllis Coltraine, who worked out of another precinct. To add to the emotion of the case, Coltraine was the lover of Li Morris, the Chief Medical Examiner and a good friend of Eve and Peabody. Coltraine was shot with her own police stunner; it also appears that she may have known her killer.

Meanwhile, Eve's contact from Internal Affairs Bureau Donald Webster clues her on the victim's connection with Alex Ricker Max Ricker's son back in Atlanta, Georgia, from where the victim requested a transfer to New York following a fallout.

Initial evidence suggests that the kill may have been ordered by Alex Ricker. The suspect's reactions, however, as well as Roarke's impressions from a private discussion they have, tend to steer the blame away from him. Eve is beginning to sense that the killer may have been one of the detectives Coltraine worked with at her precinct.

A humorous minor subplot revolves around Eve's performing another duty of friendship she has never tackled before: hosting a wedding shower for Louise Dimatto, who is marrying former "licensed companion" Charles Monroe. In the middle of the shower, Eve gets a call from dispatch informing her of the death of Rod Sandy, Alex's Personal Assistant.

After she gets back, Eve requests Charlotte Mira and Cher Reo to sit in for a debrief and ends up explaining the case to all her friends which leads Mavis to point out the killer who was the victim's partner at her precinct.

Further digging reveals the killer to be the illegitimate daughter of Max Ricker, who set her up to exact his revenge on Eve and Roarke for putting him in a cage.
