= Mary Ellen Snodgrass =

American reference text author

- Born: Mary Ellen Robinson; February 29, 1944 (age 82) Wilmington, North Carolina, USA
- Occupation: Author
- Genre: Reference books, textbooks

Mary Ellen Snodgrass (born February 29, 1944) is an American educator and writer of textbooks and general reference works.

== Biography ==
Snodgrass was born on February 29, 1944, in Wilmington, North Carolina, to William and Lucy Robinson. She attended University of North Carolina at Greensboro (1966) and Appalachian State University and is a member of Phi Beta Kappa.

Snodgrass taught English and Latin at Hickory High School and Lenoir Rhyne University for 23 years. She is a member of the North Carolina Library Board and in 2013 chaired VOYA's nonfiction honor list selection committee. Snodgrass has reviewed reference books for Booklist, Choice Reviews, Isis, and others and has won several reference books-of-the-year awards from the American Library Association, Choice, and Library Journal. Her books have also been named editor's choice by the Hickory Daily Record, Booklist, and the New York Public Library.

== Personal life ==
She married Hugh Snodgrass in 1984 and has a foster daughter, Deborah. She lives in Hickory, North Carolina.

== Selected works ==
=== Encyclopedias ===
- Utopian Literature (1995)
- Satirical Literature (1996)
- Frontier Literature (1997)
- Southern Literature (1997)
- Nursing (1999)
- World Scripture (2001)
- Gothic Literature (2004)
- Kitchen History (2004)
- Feminist Literature (2006)
- Underground Railroad (2007)
- Literature of Empire (2009)
- The Civil War Era and Reconstruction (2011)
- World Clothing and Fashion (2013)
- Settlers of the American West : The Lives of 231 Notable Pioneers, McFarland & Company (2015)
- World Ballet (2015)
- World Folk Dance (2016)
- American Colonial Women and their Art
- Women and their Art
- Frontier Women and their Art

=== Literary companions ===
- August Wilson (2004)
- Barbara Kingsolver (2004)
- Amy Tan (2004)
- Walter Dean Myers (2006)
- Kaye Gibbons (2006)
- Jamaica Kincaid (2008)
- Peter Carey (2010)
- Leslie Marmon Silko (2011)
- Isabel Allende (2012)
- Brian Friel (2017)
- Lee Smith (2019)
- Rachel Carson (2021)
- Octavia Butler (2023)
- Ken Follett (2025)
- Alice Munro (2026)

=== Cliffs Notes ===
- Greek Classics (1988)
- Roman Classics (1988)
- Bluffer's Guide to Bluffing (1989)
- Cliffs Notes in the Classroom (1990)
- A Light in the Forest Notes (1999)
