= In Death =

Series of works by Nora Roberts

First edition of Vengeance in Death (publ. Berkley Books)

The ...in Death series of novels and novellas is written by Nora Roberts under her pseudonym J. D. Robb. Set in a mid-21st-century New York City, they feature NYPSD ("New York City Police and Security Department") lieutenant Eve Dallas and her husband Roarke. The stories also regularly feature other characters, including Captain Ryan Feeney, Detective Delia Peabody, Detective Ian McNab and Dr. Charlotte Mira.

The series was first published in 1995, and, as of 2025, includes over 60 novels. Roberts has stated that the series will never contain one of Eve and Roarke's children, as this would end the series.

== Deaths ==
Below are all deaths – murder victims, murder investigations and others – that occur in the span of the In Death books, including weapon, cause of death and the perpetrator. This list does not include any attacks on persons that do not result in death.

Book	Victim	Cause of Death	Weapon	Perpetrator
Naked in Death	Sharon DeBlass	shot in head, chest and groin	Smith & Wesson Model 10	Gerald DeBlass
Naked in Death	Lola Starr (Alice Williams)	shot in head, chest and groin	SIG 210, 1980	Derrick Rockman
Naked in Death	Georgie Castle	shot in head, chest and groin	Ruger P90	Derrick Rockman
Naked in Death	Gerald DeBlass	gunshot		suicide
Naked in Death	Joseph Finestein	poisoned	custard pie	Hetta Finestein
Glory in Death	Cicely Towers	slash across throat	long-bladed knife	C. J. Morse
Glory in Death	Yvonne Metcalf	slash across throat	long-bladed knife	C. J. Morse
Glory in Death	Louise Kirski	slash across throat	long-bladed knife	C. J. Morse
Glory in Death	C. J. Morse's mother (pre-book)	slash across throat	long-bladed knife	C. J. Morse
Glory in Death	C. J. Morse	stabbed in throat	own knife	Roarke
Immortal in Death	Boomer (Carter Johannsen)	strangulation & blunt trauma	thin baseball bat	Lt. Jake Casto
Immortal in Death	Hetta Moppett (pre-book)	blunt trauma to the head		Lt. Jake Casto
Immortal in Death	Pandora	excessive trauma	cane	Lt. Jake Casto
Immortal in Death	Cockroach (Lament Ro)	blunt trauma to the head	iron pipe	Lt. Jake Casto
Immortal in Death	Jerry Fitzgerald	drug overdose	Immortality, morphine and Zeus	Lt. Jake Casto
Rapture in Death	Drew Mathias	hanging	suicide by mind control via subliminals found in virtual reality goggles	Dr. Reeanna Ott
Rapture in Death	S. T. Fitzhugh	slashed wrists	suicide by mind control via subliminals found in virtual reality goggles	Dr. Reeanna Ott
Rapture in Death	Senator Pearly	jumping	suicide by mind control via subliminals found in virtual reality goggles	Dr. Reeanna Ott
Rapture in Death	Cerise Devane	jumping	suicide by mind control via subliminals found in virtual reality goggles	Dr. Reeanna Ott
Rapture in Death	Dr. Reeanna Ott	electric shock to the throat	police stunner	suicide
Ceremony in Death	Det. Sgt. Frank Wojinsky	cardiac arrest by drugs	Digitalis and Zeus	Selina Cross & Alban
Ceremony in Death	Alice Lingstrom	chased into street and hit by car	paranoia	Selina Cross & Alban
Ceremony in Death	Lobar (Robert Allen Mathias)	removal of heart	athame	Selina Cross & Alban
Ceremony in Death	Thomas Wineburg	stabbed in heart	athame	Selina Cross & Alban
Ceremony in Death	Louis Trivane	stabbed in throat & disembowelment	athame	Mirium Hopkins
Ceremony in Death	Selina Cross	slashed throat	athame	Alban
Ceremony in Death	Alban	stabbed in heart	athame	Jamie Lingstrom
Vengeance in Death	Thomas X. Brennen	disembowelment, amputation		Liam Calhoun
Vengeance in Death	Shawn Conroy	exsanguination		Liam Calhoun
Vengeance in Death	Jennie O'Leary	slow hanging	rope	Liam Calhoun
Vengeance in Death	Liam Calhoun	overload of nervous system	stunner	Roarke
Holiday in Death	Marianna Hawley	rape, sodomy, strangulation	Christmas garland	Simon Lastrobe
Holiday in Death	Sarabeth Greenbalm	rape, sodomy, strangulation	Christmas garland	Simon Lastrobe
Holiday in Death	Donnie Ray Michael	rape, sodomy, strangulation	Christmas garland	Simon Lastrobe
Holiday in Death	Brent Holloway	rape, sodomy, strangulation	Christmas garland	Simon Lastrobe
Midnight in Death	8 victims	unknown; torture	unknown	David "Dave" Palmer
Midnight in Death	Judge Harold Wainger	torture and hanging (strangulation)	nylon strapping rope (hangman's noose)	David "Dave" Palmer
Midnight in Death	Carl Neissan	torture and hanging (strangulation)	nylon strapping rope (hangman's noose)	David "Dave" Palmer
Midnight in Death	APA Stephanie Ring	torture and hanging (strangulation)	nylon strapping rope (hangman's noose)	David "Dave" Palmer
Midnight in Death	David Palmer	electrocution	stunner; electric cage	Eve Dallas and misadventure
Conspiracy in Death	Snooks (Samuel Petrinsky)	removal of heart	surgical instruments	Dr. Michael Waverly
Conspiracy in Death	Erin Spindler (pre-book)	removal of kidneys	surgical instruments	Dr. Michael Waverly
Conspiracy in Death	Jilessa Brown	removal of liver	surgical instruments	Dr. Michael Waverly
Conspiracy in Death	Officer Ellen Bowers	blunt trauma	metal pipe	Dr. Michael Waverly
Conspiracy in Death	Dr. Tia Wo	injection of barbiturates	drug overdose	Dr. Michael Waverly
Conspiracy in Death	Jan the nurse	blunt trauma to head, single blow		Dr. Michael Waverly
Conspiracy in Death	Dr. Westley Friend (pre-book)	injection of barbiturates	drug overdose	Dr. Michael Waverly
Loyalty in Death	J. Clarence Branson	drilled to the wall through the heart	Branson 8000 Drill	Lisbeth Cooke
Loyalty in Death	Colonel Howard (Fixer) Bassi	beaten and drowned in river	Droids	Cassandra (Clarissa & B. Donald Branson)
Loyalty in Death	300+ unlisted victims	bomb explosion in Tea Room of Plaza Hotel	terrorist bombs	Cassandra (Clarissa & B. Donald Branson)
Loyalty in Death	Lieutenant Anne Malloy and "less than 400" unlisted victims	bomb explosions and panicked stampede for exits in Madison Square Garden	terrorist bombs	Cassandra (Clarissa & B. Donald Branson)
Loyalty in Death	B. Donald Branson	fall from crown of Statue of Liberty	gravity	misadventure
Loyalty in Death	Clarissa Branson (Charlotte Rowan)	jump from crown of Statue of Liberty	gravity	suicide
Witness in Death	Richard Draco	stabbed in heart during stage performance of Witness for the Prosecution	butcher knife	Areena Mansfield
Witness in Death	Linus Quim	coerced suicide	hanging	Areena Mansfield
Judgment in Death	Detective Taj Kohli	blunt trauma to head	metal baseball bat	Sergeant Arthur Clooney
Judgment in Death	Lieutenant Alan Mills	chest cut, from neck to stomach; disembowelment	knife	Sergeant Arthur Clooney
Judgment in Death	Captain Boyd Bayliss	drowning	taped-down to bathtub	Sergeant Arthur Clooney
Judgment in Death	unnamed former NYPSD officer (pre-book)	hanged	originally ruled self-termination	Sergeant Arthur Clooney
Judgment in Death	unnamed NYPSD officer (pre-book)	drowning after slipping in bathtub	originally ruled accidental	Sergeant Arthur Clooney
Judgment in Death	Lewis	unknown drug	pressure syringe to heart	unknown female assassin
Judgment in Death	'Clarence Haggerty' Yawly	shot in the head	police issued weapon	Eve Dallas
Judgment in Death	Officer Thad Clooney (pre-book)	exsanguination	unspecified	unnamed (orders from Max Ricker)
Betrayal in Death	Justice Thomas Werner	raped, beaten and strangled	two-foot sterling silver wire	Sylvester Yost
Betrayal in Death	Monique Rue	raped, beaten and strangled	two-foot sterling silver wire	Sylvester Yost
Betrayal in Death	Nigel Luca	raped, beaten and strangled	two-foot sterling silver wire	Sylvester Yost
Betrayal in Death	Britt Hague	raped, beaten and strangled	two-foot sterling silver wire	Sylvester Yost
Betrayal in Death	Joseph Hague	raped, beaten and strangled	two-foot sterling silver wire	Sylvester Yost
Betrayal in Death	Winifred C. Cates	raped, beaten and strangled	two-foot sterling silver wire	Sylvester Yost
Betrayal in Death	Darlene French	raped, beaten and strangled	two-foot sterling silver wire	Sylvester Yost
Betrayal in Death	Jonah Talbot	raped, beaten and strangled	two-foot sterling silver wire	Sylvester Yost
Betrayal in Death	Sylvester Yost	slashed across throat	mug shard	suicide
Betrayal in Death	Mick Connelly	stabbed in stomach	knife	Michel Gerade
Interlude in Death	Reginald Weeks	bludgeoned to death	metal bat	Bryson Hayes
Interlude in Death	Zita Vinter	suicide drugs	drugged in wine	Bryson Hayes
Interlude in Death	Douglas Skinner (former Commander)	suicide	drugs	voluntary suicide
Seduction in Death	Bryna Bankhead	rape and drug overdose	rape drugs Whore & Rabbit	Kevin Morano
Seduction in Death	Grace Lutz	rape and drug overdose	rape drugs Whore & Rabbit	Lucias Dunwood
Seduction in Death	Dr. Theodore McNamara	bludgeoning, drowning	lamp	Lucias Dunwood & Kevin Morano
Seduction in Death	Kevin Morano	poisoned	unidentified drug	Lucias Dunwood
Seduction in Death	Lucias Dunwood	poisoned	unidentified drug	suicide
Reunion in Death	Marsha Stibbs (pre-book)	hit to the head	glass table	Maureen Brighton
Reunion in Death	Julianna's three husbands (pre-book)	poisoned	cyanide	Julianna Dunne
Reunion in Death	Walter C. Pettibone	poisoned	cyanide	Julianna Dunne
Reunion in Death	Henry Mouton	poisoned	cyanide	Julianna Dunne
Reunion in Death	Eli Young	poisoned	cyanide	Julianna Dunne
Reunion in Death	Spencer Campbell	poisoned	cyanide	Julianna Dunne
Purity in Death	Ralph Wooster	bludgeoned	baseball bat	Louis K. Cogburn
Purity in Death	Louis K. Cogburn	police stunner(s)	light & sound frequencies, severe inter-cranial pressure driving victim to suicide	The Purity Seekers
Purity in Death	Detective Kevin Holloway	tranqed	light & sound frequencies, severe inter-cranial pressure driving victim to suicide	The Purity Seekers
Purity in Death	Chadwick Fitzhugh	slit own throat	light & sound frequencies, severe inter-cranial pressure driving victim to suicide	The Purity Seekers
Purity in Death	Mary Ellen George	hanged self	light & sound frequencies, severe inter-cranial pressure driving victim to suicide	The Purity Seekers
Purity in Death	Nick Greene	stabbed self in heart	light & sound frequencies, severe inter-cranial pressure driving victim to suicide	The Purity Seekers
Purity in Death	Hannah Wade	stabbed repeatedly	kitchen knife	Nick Greene
Purity in Death	Dru Geller		light & sound frequencies	The Purity Seekers
Portrait in Death	Rachel Howard	stabbed through heart	stiletto	Gerald Stevenson (Steve Audrey)
Portrait in Death	Kenby Sulu	stabbed through heart	stiletto	Gerald Stevenson (Steve Audrey)
Portrait in Death	Alicia Dilbert	stabbed through heart	stiletto	Gerald Stevenson (Steve Audrey)
Portrait in Death	Siobhan Brody (Roarke's mother, pre-series)	beaten to death		Patrick Michael Roarke
Imitation in Death	Jacie Wooton	slit throat, massive blood loss (killed à la Jack the Ripper)	scalpel	Niles Renquist
Imitation in Death	Lois Gregg	sexually assaulted and strangled (killed à la Boston Strangler)	robe sash/belt	Niles Renquist
Remember When	Andrea Jacobs	slash across throat	stiletto	Trevor Whittier
Remember When	Tina Cobb	severe trauma to head, torso, set on fire	baton	Trevor Whittier
Divided in Death	Felicity Kade	stunned, 14 stab wounds to chest	bread knife	Blair Bissel
Divided in Death	Carter Bissel	stunned, 18 stab wounds to chest	bread knife	Blair Bissel
Divided in Death	Chloe McCoy	suicide pills	drugged	Blair Bissel
Divided in Death	Joseph Powell	laser to carotid artery	military laser	Blair Bissel
Visions in Death	Jasper K. McKinney (pre-book)	fall from apartment building	gravity	misadventure
Visions in Death	Elisa Maplewood	beating, rape, strangulation, removal of eyes	red ribbon	John Blue
Visions in Death	Lily Napier	beating, rape, strangulation, removal of eyes	red ribbon	John Blue
Visions in Death	Marjorie Kates	beating, rape, strangulation, removal of eyes	red ribbon	John Blue
Visions in Death	Breen Merriweather	beating, rape, strangulation, removal of eyes	red ribbon	John Blue
Visions in Death	Ineza Blue	beating, rape, strangulation, removal of eyes	red ribbon	John Blue
Visions in Death	Lena Greenspan (pre-book)	beating, rape, strangulation, removal of eyes	red ribbon	John Blue
Visions in Death	Sarie Parker (pre-book)	beating, rape, strangulation, removal of eyes	red ribbon	John Blue
Visions in Death	8 unnamed women (pre-book)	beating, rape, strangulation, removal of eyes	red ribbon	John Blue
Visions in Death	Annalisa Sommers	beating, rape, strangulation, removal of eyes	red ribbon	Celina Sanchez
Survivor in Death	Inga Snood	slash across throat	combat knife	Sergeant Roger Kirkendall, Sergeant Isaac Clinton, Corporal Jilly Isenberry
Survivor in Death	Grant Swisher	slash across throat	combat knife	Sergeant Roger Kirkendall, Sergeant Isaac Clinton, Corporal Jilly Isenberry
Survivor in Death	Keelie Swisher	slash across throat	combat knife	Sergeant Roger Kirkendall, Sergeant Isaac Clinton, Corporal Jilly Isenberry
Survivor in Death	Coyle Swisher	slash across throat	combat knife	Sergeant Roger Kirkendall, Sergeant Isaac Clinton, Corporal Jilly Isenberry
Survivor in Death	Linnie Dyson	slash across throat	combat knife	Sergeant Roger Kirkendall, Sergeant Isaac Clinton, Corporal Jilly Isenberry
Survivor in Death	Meredith Newman	slash across throat	combat knife	Sergeant Roger Kirkendall, Sergeant Isaac Clinton, Corporal Jilly Isenberry
Survivor in Death	Detective Owen Knight	slash across throat	combat knife	Sergeant Roger Kirkendall, Sergeant Isaac Clinton, Corporal Jilly Isenberry
Survivor in Death	Detective James Preston	slash across throat	combat knife	Sergeant Roger Kirkendall, Sergeant Isaac Clinton, Corporal Jilly Isenberry
Survivor in Death	Dr. Jaynene Brenegan (pre-book, 2055)	multiple stab wounds	unnamed	Sergeant Roger Kirkendall, Sergeant Isaac Clinton, Corporal Jilly Isenberry
Survivor in Death	Judge Thomas Moss and son Evan Moss (pre-book, 2057)	explosion	car bomb	Sergeant Roger Kirkendall, Sergeant Isaac Clinton, Corporal Jilly Isenberry
Survivor in Death	Karin Duberry (pre-book, 2058)	strangulation	manual	Sergeant Roger Kirkendall, Sergeant Isaac Clinton, Corporal Jilly Isenberry
Survivor in Death	Corporal Jilly Isenberry	broken neck	fall down stairs	
Origin in Death	Dr. Wilfred B. Icove	stabbed in chest	scalpel	Deena Flavia
Origin in Death	Dr. Wilfred Icove, Jr.	stabbed in chest	scalpel	Avril Icove
Origin in Death	Evelyn Samuels	stabbed in chest	scalpel	Deena Flavia
Origin in Death	Deena Flavia	laser blast	laser	Jonah Delacourt Wilson (clone)
Origin in Death	Dr. Wilfred B. Icove (clone)	laser blast	laser	Jonah Delacourt Wilson (clone)
Origin in Death	Jonah Delacourt Wilson (clone)	laser blast	laser	Eve Dallas and Roarke
Memory in Death	Rosie O'Hara and 150+ unlisted victims (pre-book)	explosion in nightclub	bomb	unnamed terrorists
Memory in Death	Max "Tubbs" Lawrence	jumped out of window under the influence of drugs	Zeus	misadventure
Memory in Death	Leo Jacobs	crushed by falling body		Max Lawrence
Memory in Death	Trudy Lombard	fractured skull by multiple blows	sap	Zana Lombard (Marnie Ralston)
Haunted in Death	Radcliff C. Hopkins III	bullets to torso, arm and head	9mm Smith & Wesson	Maeve Buchanan
Haunted in Death	Bobbie Bray (pre-book)	single bullet to head	9mm Smith & Wesson	Radcliff "Hop" C. Hopkins I
Born in Death	Sophia Belegt (pre-book)	unknown	unknown	Winfield Chase (all except the last on orders on conspiracy with Madeline Bullock)
Born in Death	Emily Jones (pre-book)	head trauma	unknown	Winfield Chase (all except the last on orders on conspiracy with Madeline Bullock)
Born in Death	Natalie Copperfield	strangulation after torture	manual	Winfield Chase (all except the last on orders on conspiracy with Madeline Bullock)
Born in Death	Bick Byson	strangulation after torture	manual	Winfield Chase (all except the last on orders on conspiracy with Madeline Bullock)
Born in Death	Randall Sloan	hanging	tranquilized then hanged	Winfield Chase (all except the last on orders on conspiracy with Madeline Bullock)
Born in Death	Madeline Bullock	broken neck	manually	Winfield Chase (all except the last on orders on conspiracy with Madeline Bullock)
Innocent in Death	Trevor Straffo (pre-book)	broken neck, head trauma	push down stairs	Rayleen Straffo
Innocent in Death	Adele Versy (pre-book)	overdose	sleeping pills	Rayleen Straffo
Innocent in Death	Craig Foster	poisoned	ricin	Rayleen Straffo
Innocent in Death	Reed Williams	paralyzed by poison, drowned	surgical paralytic substance	Rayleen Straffo
Creation in Death	Edwina Spring (pre-book)	torture, exsanguination by cut wrist	rope, knives, scalpel, needles, sap, blow torch, laser, dry ice, electric shock and drugs	Robert Lowell Sr.
Creation in Death	Corrine Dagby (pre-book)	torture, exsanguination by cut wrist	rope, knives, scalpel, needles, sap, blow torch, laser, dry ice, electric shock and drugs	Robert Lowell Jr., a.k.a. The Groom
Creation in Death	Melissa Congress (pre-book)	torture, exsanguination by cut wrist	rope, knives, scalpel, needles, sap, blow torch, laser, dry ice, electric shock and drugs	Robert Lowell Jr., a.k.a. The Groom
Creation in Death	Anise Waters (pre-book)	torture, exsanguination by cut wrist	rope, knives, scalpel, needles, sap, blow torch, laser, dry ice, electric shock and drugs	Robert Lowell Jr., a.k.a. The Groom
Creation in Death	Joley Weitz (pre-book)	torture, exsanguination by cut wrist	rope, knives, scalpel, needles, sap, blow torch, laser, dry ice, electric shock and drugs	Robert Lowell Jr., a.k.a. The Groom
Creation in Death	18 unnamed women and unknown number of other victims (pre-book)	torture, exsanguination by cut wrist	rope, knives, scalpel, needles, sap, blow torch, laser, dry ice, electric shock and drugs	Robert Lowell Jr., a.k.a. The Groom
Creation in Death	Sarifina York	torture, exsanguination by cut wrist	rope, knives, scalpel, needles, sap, blow torch, laser, dry ice, electric shock and drugs	Robert Lowell Jr., a.k.a. The Groom
Creation in Death	Gia Rossi	torture, exsanguination by cut wrist	rope, knives, scalpel, needles, sap, blow torch, laser, dry ice, electric shock and drugs	Robert Lowell Jr., a.k.a. The Groom
Eternity in Death	Gregor Pensky (pre-book)	exsanguination from twin puncture wounds in neck	artificial vampire fangs	Dorian Vadim
Eternity in Death	Tiara Kent	exsanguination from twin puncture wounds in neck	artificial vampire fangs	Dorian Vadim
Eternity in Death	Allesseria Carter	exsanguination from twin puncture wounds in neck	artificial vampire fangs	Dorian Vadim
Strangers in Death	Reginald Thomas Anders (pre-book)	fractured skull	shoved in the shower and slammed head into Italian marble	Ava Anders
Strangers in Death	Ned Custer (pre-book)	slit throat and castration	knife	Ava Anders
Strangers in Death	Thomas Aurelius Anders	strangulation	tranquilized then strangled by rope	Suzanne Custer
Salvation in Death	Nick Soto (pre-book)	multiple stab wounds	knife	Lino Martinez and Penelope Soto
Salvation in Death	Ronni Edwards (pre-book)	bombing at a school auditorium in 2043	bomb	The Soldados/Lino Martinez & Penelope Soto
Salvation in Death	Kobie Smith (pre-book)	bombing at convenience store in 2043	bomb	The Soldados/Lino Martinez & Penelope Soto
Salvation in Death	Quinto Turner (pre-book)	bombing at convenience store in 2043	bomb	The Soldados/Lino Martinez & Penelope Soto
Salvation in Death	Three unnamed minors (pre-book)	bombing at convenience store in 2043	bomb	The Soldados/Lino Martinez & Penelope Soto
Salvation in Death	Joseph Turner (pre-book, year 2044)	hanging		Suicide
Salvation in Death	José Ortega (pre-book)	drug overdose	unnamed drugs	unintentional suicide
Salvation in Death	Miguel Flores (pre-book)	stabbed	unknown	Steve Chávez
Salvation in Death	Steve Chávez (pre-book)	unknown	unknown	Lino Martinez
Salvation in Death	Lino Martinez	poisoning	potassium cyanide	Juanita Rodriguez Turner
Salvation in Death	Jimmy Jay Jenkins	poisoning	potassium cyanide	Billy Crocker
Ritual in Death	Ava Marsterson	ritual killing, slit throat, multiple stab wounds	multiple drugs, knives	Silas Pratt, Ola Pratt, Lawrence Collins, Bria Collins, Leah Burke, Kiki, Rodney, 6 others
Ritual in Death	Brian Trosky	hammer to cave in his own skull	drugged and hypnotized	Silas Pratt, Ola Pratt, Lawrence Collins, Bria Collins, Leah Burke, Kiki, Rodney, 6 others
Promises in Death	Amaryllis Coltraine	full impact to throat	police issue stunner	Detective Cleo Grady (on command of Max Ricker)
Promises in Death	Rod Sandy	stabbed through torso	stiletto	Detective Cleo Grady (on command of Max Ricker)
Kindred in Death	Deena MacMasters	raped, beaten, sodomized, strangled		Darrin Pauley (masterminded by Vance Pauley)
Kindred in Death	Karlene Robins	raped, beaten, sodomized, strangled		Darrin Pauley (masterminded by Vance Pauley)
Missing in Death	Dana Buckley	slit throat	bone dagger	Ivan Draski
Fantasy in Death	Bart Minnock	beheaded	sword (holo game)	Levar (Var) Hoyt
Indulgence in Death	Holly Curlow	strangled	manually	Kevin Donahue
Indulgence in Death	Melly Bristow (pre-book)	broken neck	manually	Winston Dudley IV and Sylvester Moriarity III
Indulgence in Death	Sophia Ricci (pre-book)	unknown (body never found)	unknown	Winston Dudley IV and Sylvester Moriarity III
Indulgence in Death	Linette Jones (pre-book)	beaten	tire iron	Winston Dudley IV and Sylvester Moriarity III
Indulgence in Death	unnamed architect (pre-book)	garroted	wire	Winston Dudley IV and Sylvester Moriarity III
Indulgence in Death	Larinda Villi (pre-book)	stabbed through heart	unknown	Winston Dudley IV and Sylvester Moriarity III
Indulgence in Death	Jamal Houston	bolt through neck	crossbow	Sylvester Moriarity III
Indulgence in Death	Ava Crampton	stabbed through heart	bayonet	Winston Dudley IV
Indulgence in Death	Luc Delaflote	impaled through heart	harpoon	Sylvester Moriarity III
Indulgence in Death	Adrianne Jonas	hanged	bullwhip	Winston Dudley IV
Possession in Death	Gizi Szabo	stabbed	dagger	Sasha Korchov
Possession in Death	Vanessa Warwich, Allegra Martin, Lucy Quinn and five others (pre-book)	slit throat	dagger	Sasha Korchov
Treachery in Death	Charlie Ochi	electrocution	homemade Jammer	Bruster Lowe, a.k.a. Skid; Leon Slatter, a.k.a. Slash; and Jimmy K Rogan, a.k.a. Smash
Treachery in Death	Rickie Keener, street name "Juicy"	poisoned	apparent (manipulated) overdose	Detective Carl Bix (on orders from Lieutenant Renee Oberman)
Treachery in Death	Detective William Garnet	slit throat	military knife	Detective Carl Bix (on orders from Lieutenant Renee Oberman)
Treachery in Death	Detective Gail Devin (pre book)	broken neck	unknown	unknown (on orders from Lieutenant Renee Oberman)
Treachery in Death	Detective Harold Strumb (pre-book)	stabbed	unknown	unknown, possibly Detective Marcell) (on orders from Lieutenant Renee Oberman)
New York to Dallas	Alice McQueen (pre-book)	slit throat	knife	Isaac McQueen
New York to Dallas	Carla Bingham (pre-book)	slit throat	knife	Isaac McQueen
New York to Dallas	Patricia Coppley (pre-book)	slit throat	knife	Isaac McQueen
New York to Dallas	Nancy Draper (pre-book)	slit throat	knife	Isaac McQueen
New York to Dallas	4 unnamed victims (pre-book)	slit throat	knife	Isaac McQueen
New York to Dallas	Riker's Nurse (pre-book)	slit throat	knife	Isaac McQueen
New York to Dallas	Sylvia Prentice (a.k.a. Stella)	slit throat	knife	Isaac McQueen
New York to Dallas	Officer Malvie	slit throat	laser scalpel	Sylvia Prentice (a.k.a. Stella)
Chaos in Death	Jennifer Darnell	strangulation	manual	Dr. Chaos (alter ego to Ken Dickerson)
Chaos in Death	Coby Vix	bludgeoned	pipe	Dr. Chaos (alter ego to Ken Dickerson)
Chaos in Death	Wilson Bickford	multiple stab wounds	4-inch, jagged-edged knife	Dr. Chaos (alter ego to Ken Dickerson)
Chaos in Death	Eton Billingsly	multiple stab wounds and bites	knife and teeth	Dr. Chaos (alter ego to Ken Dickerson)
Celebrity in Death	Cecil Silcock	head trauma	cast-iron skillet	Paul Havertoe
Celebrity in Death	K. T. Harris	head trauma, drowned	pushed, dragged into pool	Joel Steinburger
Celebrity in Death	A. A. Asner	smashed skull	Maltese falcon statue	Joel Steinburger
Celebrity in Death	Bryson Kane (pre-book)	broken neck and other injuries	fall/pushed down stairs	Joel Steinburger
Celebrity in Death	Marlin Dessler (pre-book)	internal bleeding and other injuries	fall/pushed off cliff	Joel Steinburger
Celebrity in Death	Angelica Caulfield and unborn fetus (pre-book)	overdose	drugs	Joel Steinburger
Celebrity in Death	Jacoby Miles (pre-book)	beaten	ten-pound dumbbell	Joel Steinburger
Celebrity in Death	Sherri Wendell (pre-book)	fall, drowned	drugs, pushed	Joel Steinburger
Celebrity in Death	Buster Pearlman (pre-book)	overdose	drugs and alcohol	Joel Steinburger
Celebrity in Death	Allys Beaker (pre-book)	fractured skull	slipped in shower	Joel Steinburger
Delusion in Death	Lance Abrams, John Burke, Joseph Cattery, Paul Garrison, D B Graham, Travis Greenspan, Evie Hydelburg, Wendy McMahon, Cherie Quinz, Cate Simpson, Hilly Simpson, Macie Snyder, Amie Stewart, Gwen Talbert, Brenden Wang, Katrina and 68 unnamed victims.	multiple and varied injuries from weapons of opportunity	psycho-active chemical warfare gas	Lewis Callaway
Delusion in Death	Jeni Curve, Brenda Deitz, Carly Fisher, Allison Nighly and 40 unnamed victims.	multiple and varied injuries from weapons of opportunity	psycho-active chemical warfare gas	Lewis Callaway
Calculated in Death	Marta Dickenson	broken neck	manually	Clinton Frye (on orders from Sterling Alexander)
Calculated in Death	Chaz Parzarri	asphyxiation	manually	Clinton Frye (on orders from Sterling Alexander)
Calculated in Death	Jake Ingersol	blunt head trauma	claw hammer	Clinton Frye (on orders from Sterling Alexander)
Thankless in Death	Barbara Reinhold	multiple stab wounds	kitchen knife	Jerald "Jerry" Reinhold
Thankless in Death	Carl Reinhold	blunt trauma	baseball bat	Jerald "Jerry" Reinhold
Thankless in Death	Lori Nuccio	strangulation	cord	Jerald "Jerry" Reinhold
Thankless in Death	Edie Barrett Farnsworth	asphyxiation	taped plastic bag	Jerald "Jerry" Reinhold
Taken in Death	Darcia Jordan	multiple stab wounds, slit throat	ritualist knife	Maj Borgstrom
Concealed in Death	Linh Carol Penbroke, Shelby Ann Stubacker, Angel West (Jane Doe), Lupa Dison, Mikki Wendall, Iris Kirkwood, Merry Wolcovich, Crystal Hugh, LaRue Freeman, Carlie Bowen, Kim Terrance and Shashona Maddox	drowning	bathtub	Montclair Jones
Festive in Death	Trey Ziegler	blunt head trauma	trophy	Natasha Quigley
Festive in Death	Catiana Dubois	fractured skull	marble ledge (pushed)	Natasha Quigley
Obsession in Death	Leanore Bastwick	strangled	garrote	Lottie Roebuck
Obsession in Death	Wendall Ledo	stabbed	pool cue	Lottie Roebuck
"Wonderment in Death", Down the Rabbit Hole anthology	Marcus Fitzwilliams	stabbed	scissors	Darlene Fitzwilliams
"Wonderment in Death", Down the Rabbit Hole anthology	Darlene Fitzwilliams	fall from height	defenestration	suicide
Devoted in Death	Robert Jansen (pre-book)	blunt trauma	tire iron and fists	Ella-Loo Parsens and Darryl James
Devoted in Death	Melvin Little, Noah Paston, Ava Enderson, Jacob Fastbinder and 24 unnamed victims (pre-book)	torture then exsanguination	variety of tools	Ella-Loo Parsens and Darryl James
Devoted in Death	Samuel Zed (pre-book)	blunt trauma		Ella-Loo Parsens and Darryl James
Devoted in Death	Dorian Kuper	torture then exsanguination	variety of tools	Ella-Loo Parsens and Darryl James
Brotherhood in Death	Edward Mira	hanged	chandelier/torture	Women assaulted by "The Brotherhood"
Brotherhood in Death	Jonas Wymann	hanged	chandelier/torture	Women assaulted by "The Brotherhood"
Brotherhood in Death	Frederick Betz	hanged	chandelier/torture	Women assaulted by "The Brotherhood"
Brotherhood in Death	William Stevenson (pre-book)	hanged		suicide
Apprentice in Death	Susann Prinz Mackie (pre-book)	hit	car	Brian T. Fine
Apprentice in Death	Ellissa Wyman	shot	tactical laser rifle	Reginald and Willow Mackie
Apprentice in Death	Brent Michaelson	shot	tactical laser rifle	Reginald and Willow Mackie
Apprentice in Death	Alan Markum	shot	tactical laser rifle	Reginald and Willow Mackie
Apprentice in Death	Fern Addison	shot	tactical laser rifle	Reginald and Willow Mackie
Apprentice in Death	Officer Kevin Russo	shot	tactical laser rifle	Reginald and Willow Mackie
Apprentice in Death	Nathaniel Jarvits	shot	tactical laser rifle	Reginald and Willow Mackie
Apprentice in Death	David Chang	shot	tactical laser rifle	Reginald and Willow Mackie
Apprentice in Death	Jonah Rothstein and 17 unnamed victims at Madison Square Garden	shot	tactical laser rifle	Willow Mackie
Echoes in Death	Anthony Strazza	blunt force trauma	vase	Daphne Strazza
Echoes in Death	Xavier Carver	slit throat	scalpel	Kyle Knightly
Echoes in Death	Miko Carver	strangled	rope	Kyle Knightly
Secrets in Death	Larinda Mars	stabbed in arm	scalpel	William Hyatt
Secrets in Death	Kellie Lowry	stabbed in leg	scalpel	William Hyatt
Dark in Death	Rosie Kent	strangled	white ribbon	Ann Elizabeth Smith
Dark in Death	Chanel Rylan	stabbed in the neck	ice pick	Ann Elizabeth Smith
Dark in Death	Loxie Flash	poisoned	cyanide	Ann Elizabeth Smith
Leverage in Death	12 people including Paul Rogan	suicide bombing (Rogan forced to commit attack)	bombs	Lucius Iler and Oliver Silverman
Leverage in Death	Jordan Banks	broken neck	manually	Oliver Silverman
Leverage in Death	5 people including Wayne Denby	suicide bombing (Denby forced to commit attack)	bombs	Lucius Iler and Oliver Silverman
Connections in Death	"Low-Rent Illegals Dealer"	stabbed in throat	knife ("sticker")	"Dobber," a junkie
Connections in Death	Stuart Adler	broken neck, knife to abdomen	pocket knife, trip and fall (down stairs while peeling apple with knife while intoxicated)	Self, Accidental
Connections in Death	Lyle Pickering	apparent (staged) drug overdose	tranquilized, then forcibly injected with "Go," "Out"	Dinnie "Banger" Duff, Barry "Fist" Aimes, Denby "Snapper" Washington and Burke "Ticker" Chesterfield (performed the injection); performed on the orders of Kenneth "Bolt" Jorgenson (and recommendations of Samuel Cohen)
Connections in Death	Dinnie Duff	beating, gang-rape, manual strangulation	manual	Barry "Fist" Aimes, Denby "Snapper" Washington and Burke "Ticker" Chesterfield; performed on the orders of Kenneth "Bolt" Jorgenson (and recommendations of Samuel Cohen)
Connections in Death	Barry Aimes	slashed throat	knife	Denby "Snapper" Washington, Burke "Ticker" Chesterfield and Kenneth "Bolt" Jorgenson; (performed on the recommendations of Samuel Cohen)
Vendetta in Death	Nigel B. McEnroy	torture/electrocution, castration	various tools (torture), ceremonial blade (castration)	Darla Pettigrew (as "Lady Justice")
Vendetta in Death	Thaddeus Pettigrew	torture/electrocution, castration	various tools (torture), ceremonial blade (castration)	Darla Pettigrew (as "Lady Justice")
Vendetta in Death	Arlo Kagen	torture/electrocution, castration	various tools (torture), ceremonial blade (castration)	Darla Pettigrew (as "Lady Justice")
Golden in Death	Lucas "Loco" Sanchez (pre-book)	stabbed	kitchen/steak knife	Stephen "Steve" Whitt and Marshall Cosner
Golden in Death	Dr. Kent Abner	poisoned	mix of sarin and sulfur trioxide (gold plastic egg filled with chemically engineered nerve agent (aerosolized sulfur trioxide and sarin gas, with additive for quick death and minimal dispersal))	Stephen "Steve" Whitt and Marshall Cosner
Golden in Death	Elise Duran	poisoned	mix of sarin and sulfur trioxide (gold plastic egg filled with chemically engineered nerve agent (aerosolized sulfur trioxide and sarin gas, with additive for quick death and minimal dispersal))	Stephen "Steve" Whitt and Marshall Cosner
Golden in Death	Marshall Cosner	drugged and poisoned	mix of sarin and sulfur trioxide (drugged, then convinced to handle improperly sealed nerve gas egg)	Stephen "Steve" Whitt
Shadows in Death	Smuggler, unknown name	beaten to death	manual	Frankie Nalley
Shadows in Death	Galla Modesto	slashed throat	knife	Lorcan Cobbe, (professional hit; hired by Jorge Tween)
Shadows in Death	443 murders (pre-book)	stabbed or slashed throat	knife	Lorcan Cobbe (professional hit)
Shadows in Death	Ellen and Thaddeus Solomen (pre-book)	slashed throat	knife	Lorcan Cobbe and Thomas "Big Tom" Ivan, (professional hit; hired by Colin "Boss" Boswell)
Shadows in Death	Adam Solomen (pre-book)	tortured, gutted	knife	Lorcan Cobbe and Thomas "Big Tom" Ivan, (professional hit; hired by Colin "Boss" Boswell)
Shadows in Death	Thomas "Big Tom" Ivan (pre-book)	stabbed	knife	Lorcan Cobbe
Shadows in Death	Sweetie (cat)	slashed throat	knife	Lorcan Cobbe
Shadows in Death	Ingrid Frederick (pre-book)	unknown	unknown	Lorcan Cobbe
Shadows in Death	Kaylee Skye	beaten, manual strangulation	manual	Lorcan Cobbe
Shadows in Death	400+ (unknown number of) murders (pre-book)	unknown	unknown	Lorcan Cobbe
Faithless in Death	Ariel Byrd	blunt force trauma	mallet	Mirium Wilkey (daughter of Stanton Wilkey, head of Natural Order)
Faithless in Death	Keene Grimsley (pre-book)	unknown	unknown; cremated post-mortem	Unknown (on orders of Natural Order)
Faithless in Death	Karyn Keye (pre-book)	suicide by hanging	unknown	Suicide (Guilt from involvement with Natural Order's human trafficking, etc.)
Faithless in Death	Marcia Piper	blunt force trauma/beaten to death	manual	Lawrence "Larry" Piper
Forgotten in Death	Alva Quirk (Alva Elliot, Alva Wicker)	head trauma	crowbar	Alexei Tovinski
Forgotten in Death	Carmine Delgato	apparent (staged) suicide by hanging	tranquilized with Dexachlorine, then forcibly hanged with rope	Alexei Tovinski
Forgotten in Death	Johara Murr, pregnant with male viable fetus (pre-book)	shot	32-caliber handgun	Elinor Bolton Singer
Abandoned in Death	Lauren Elder	slit throat	pocketknife	Andrew "Andy" Dawber (John McKinney, John Church)
Abandoned in Death	Anna Hobe	slit throat	pocketknife	Andrew "Andy" Dawber (John McKinney, John Church)
Abandoned in Death	Dr. Joseph "Joe" Fletcher (pre-book)	car accident	"drunk driver"	Unknown, DUI
Abandoned in Death	Violet Fletcher (Lisa McKinney) (pre-book)	overdose	prescription medication, "sleeping pills"	Self, Suicide
Desperation in Death	Mina Cabot	Speared in chest	Plank of old wood	Devin Kunes (night security)
Desperation in Death	Jonah K. Devereaux	stabbed in throat	Knife	Amara Gharbi (aka: Luna)
Desperation in Death	Marlene Williamson (Matron)	unknown	body disposed via cremation	ordered by "Auntie" Iris Beaty/Iris Swan
Desperation in Death	Unnamed Nurse	unknown	body disposed via cremation	ordered by "Auntie" Iris Beaty/Iris Swan
Encore in Death	Brant Fitzhugh	poison	cyanide in glass of champagne	Eliza Lane
Encore in Death	Debra Bernstein	poison	cyanide in glass of vodka	Eliza Lane
Encore in Death	Rose Bernstein (pre-book)	accidental overdose	pills placed in bottle of vodka	Assisted by Eliza Lane
Payback in Death	Captain Martin Greenleaf, Retired	Electric Shock to the throat	Police Stunner	Denzel Robards (Planned and ordered by Elva Arnez)
Payback in Death	Brice Noy (Pre-Book)	Hanging	Rope	Suicide
Payback in Death	Captain Louis Noy (Pre-Book)	Electric Shock to throat	Police Issue Stunner	Suicide
Random in Death	Jenna Harbough	Overdose	Drugs/STDs cocktail injected while distracted at concerts	Francis Bryce
Random in Death	Arlie Dillon	Overdose	Drugs/STDs cocktail injected while distracted at concerts	Francis Bryce
Passions in Death	Erin Albright	Garroted	Piano wire	Greg Barney
Bonded in Death	Giovanni Rossi aka Wasp	Poison	Toxic Gas Phosphine	Conrad Potter aka Shark
Bonded in Death	Leroy Dubois aka Hawk (pre-book)	Shot	Gun	Conrad Potter aka Shark
Bonded in Death	Alice Dormer aka Fawn (pre-book)	Bomb Explosion	Terrorist Bomb	Conrad Potter aka Shark
Framed in Death	Leesa Culver	Strangulation	tranquilized with barbiturates and then strangled with hands	Jonathan Harper Ebersole
Framed in Death	Robert Ren	Strangulation	tranquilized with barbiturates and then strangled with hands	Jonathan Harper Ebersole
Framed in Death	Janette Whithers	Strangulation	tranquilized with barbiturates and then strangled with hands	Jonathan Harper Ebersole
Stolen in Death	Nathan Barrister	Brained	Large amethyst rock	Joy Barrister
Fury in Death	Lucia Delgato	beaten to death		Steven Redman
Fury in Death	Lawrence Chu	beaten to death		Steven Redman
Fury in Death	Ezra Dent	beaten to death		Steven Redman
Fury in Death	Carlos Cruz	beaten to death		Steven Redman
Fury in Death	Jacob Wyst	beaten to death		Steven Redman

Note: "stunner" and "laser" are both terms used interchangeably for the fictional weapons that the NYPSD carry in the In Death books; they release a strong electrical, laser-like stun that can do anything from incapacitating to killing the victim.

== Bibliography ==
=== In Death series ===
#	Title	Publication Date	Included In	ISBN	Comments
1	Naked in Death	Jul 1995		ISBN 978-0-425-14829-7	
2	Glory in Death	Dec 1995		ISBN 978-0-425-15098-6	
3	Immortal in Death	Jul 1996		ISBN 978-0-425-15378-9	
4	Rapture in Death	Oct 1996		ISBN 978-0-425-15518-9	
5	Ceremony in Death	May 1997		ISBN 978-0-425-15762-6	
6	Vengeance in Death	Oct 1997		ISBN 978-0-425-16039-8	
7	Holiday in Death	Jun 1998		ISBN 978-0-425-16371-9	
7.5	Midnight in Death	Nov 1998	Silent Night Three in Death	ISBN 978-0425219713	
8	Conspiracy in Death	Apr 1999		ISBN 978-0-425-16813-4	
9	Loyalty in Death	Oct 1999		ISBN 978-0-425-17140-0	
10	Witness in Death	Mar 2000		ISBN 978-0-425-17363-3	
11	Judgment in Death	Sep 2000		ISBN 978-0-425-17630-6	
12	Betrayal in Death	Mar 2001		ISBN 978-0-425-17857-7	
12.5	Interlude in Death	Aug 2001	Out of this World Three in Death	ISBN 978-0425210628	
13	Seduction in Death	Sep 2001		ISBN 978-0-425-18146-1	
14	Reunion in Death	Mar 2002		ISBN 978-0-425-18397-7	
15	Purity in Death	Sep 2002		ISBN 978-0-425-18630-5	
16	Portrait in Death	Mar 2003		ISBN 978-0-425-18903-0	
17	Imitation in Death	Sep 2003		ISBN 978-0-425-19158-3	
17.5	Remember When	Sep 2003		ISBN 978-0-399-15106-4	with Nora Roberts
18	Divided in Death	Jan 2004		ISBN 978-0-399-15154-5	
19	Visions in Death	Aug 2004		ISBN 978-0-399-15171-2	
20	Survivor in Death	Feb 2005		ISBN 978-0-399-15208-5	
21	Origin in Death	Jul 2005		ISBN 978-0-399-15289-4	
22	Memory in Death	Jan 2006		ISBN 978-0-399-15328-0	
22.5	Haunted in Death	Apr 2006	Bump in the Night Three in Death	ISBN 978-0749958480	
23	Born in Death	Nov 2006		ISBN 978-0-399-15347-1	
24	Innocent in Death	Feb 2007		ISBN 978-0-399-15401-0	
25	Creation in Death	Nov 2007		ISBN 978-0-399-15436-2	
25.5	Eternity in Death	Nov 2007	Dead of Night Time of Death	ISBN 978-0749958480	
26	Strangers in Death	Feb 2008		ISBN 978-0-399-15470-6	
27	Salvation in Death	Nov 2008		ISBN 978-0-399-15522-2	
27.5	Ritual in Death	Nov 2008	Suite 606 Time of Death	ISBN 978-0749958497	
28	Promises in Death	Feb 2009		ISBN 978-0-399-15548-2	
29	Kindred in Death	Nov 2009		ISBN 978-0-399-15595-6	
29.5	Missing in Death	Dec 2009	The Lost Time of Death	ISBN 978-0-399-15595-6	
30	Fantasy in Death	Jan 2010		ISBN 978-0-749-94078-2	
31	Indulgence in Death	Nov 2010		ISBN 978-0-399-15687-8	
31.5	Possession in Death	Nov 2010	The Other Side	ISBN 978-0349400563	
32	Treachery in Death	Feb 2011		ISBN 978-0-399-15703-5	
33	New York to Dallas	Sep 2011		ISBN 978-0-399-15778-3	
33.5	Chaos in Death	Sep 2011	The Unquiet	ISBN 978-0349400563	
34	Celebrity in Death	Feb 2012		ISBN 978-0-399-15830-8	
35	Delusion in Death	Sep 2012		ISBN 978-0-399-15881-0	
36	Calculated in Death	Feb 2013		ISBN 978-0-399-15882-7	
37	Thankless in Death	Sep 2013		ISBN 978-0-399-16442-2	
37.5	Taken in Death	Oct 2013	Mirror, Mirror	ISBN 978-0349400563	
38	Concealed in Death	Feb 2014		ISBN 978-0-399-16443-9	
39	Festive in Death	Sep 2014		ISBN 978-0-399-16444-6	
40	Obsession in Death	Feb 2015		ISBN 978-0-399-17087-4	
41	Devoted in Death	Sep 2015		ISBN 978-0-399-17088-1	
41.5	Wonderment in Death	Sep 2015	Down the Rabbit Hole	ISBN 978-0515155471	
42	Brotherhood in Death	Feb 2016		ISBN 978-0-399-17089-8	
43	Apprentice in Death	Sep 2016		ISBN 978-1-101-98797-1	
44	Echoes in Death	Feb 2017		ISBN 978-1-250-12311-4	
45	Secrets in Death	Sep 2017		ISBN 978-1-250-12315-2	
46	Dark in Death	Jan 2018		ISBN 978-1-250-16153-6	
47	Leverage in Death	Sep 2018		ISBN 978-0-349-41791-2	
48	Connections in Death	Feb 2019		ISBN 978-1250201577	
49	Vendetta in Death	Sep 2019		ISBN 978-1250207173	
50	Golden in Death	Feb 2020		ISBN 978-1250207203	
51	Shadows in Death	Dec 2020		ISBN 978-1250207234	
52	Faithless in Death	Feb 2021		ISBN 978-1250771827	
53	Forgotten in Death	Sep 2021		ISBN 978-1250272812	
54	Abandoned in Death	Feb 2022		ISBN 978-1250278210	
55	Desperation in Death	Sep 7, 2022		ISBN 978-1250278234	
56	Encore in Death	Feb 7, 2023		ISBN 978-1250284082	
57	Payback in Death	Sep 5, 2023		ISBN 978-1250284099	
58	Random in Death	Jan 23, 2024		ISBN 978-1250289544	
59	Passions in Death	Sep 3, 2024		ISBN 978-1250289568	
60	Bonded in Death	Feb 4, 2025		ISBN 978-1250370808	
61	Framed in Death	Sep 2, 2025		ISBN 978-1250370822	
62	Stolen in Death	Feb 3, 2026		ISBN 978-1250414533	
63	Fury in Death	Sep 1, 2026		ISBN 978-1250414571	

=== Anthologies and collections ===
Anthology or collection	Contents	Publication Date	ISBN
Silent Night	Midnight in Death	Nov 1998	ISBN 978-0-515-12385-2
Out of this World	Interlude in Death	Aug 2001	ISBN 978-0-515-13109-3
Bump in the Night	Haunted in Death	Apr 2006	ISBN 978-0-515-14117-7
Dead of Night	Eternity in Death	Nov 2007	ISBN 978-0-515-14367-6
Three in Death	Interlude in Death Midnight in Death Haunted in Death	Jan 2008	ISBN 0425219712, 9780425219713
Suite 606	Ritual in Death	Nov 2008	ISBN 978-0-425-22444-1
The Lost	Missing in Death	Dec 2009	ISBN 978-0-515-14718-6
The Other Side	Possession in Death	Nov 2010	ISBN 978-0-515-14867-1
Time of Death	Eternity in Death Ritual in Death Missing in Death	Jun 2011	ISBN 0425240827, 9780425240823
The Unquiet	Chaos in Death	Sep 2011	ISBN 978-0-515-14998-2
Mirror, Mirror	Taken in Death	Oct 2013	ISBN 0515154075, 9780515154078
Down the Rabbit Hole	Wonderment in Death	Sep 2015	ISBN 978-1-501-22377-8

=== Other media ===
On October 7, 2025, St. Martin's Press published a cookbook featuring 74 recipes from the In Death series, titled The In Death Cookbook: To-Die-For Recipes from the World of J. D. Robb by Theresa Carle-Sanders. The foreword is written by J.D. Robb.

== Major characters ==
=== Eve Dallas ===
- First Appearance: Naked in Death

Eve was found in an alley in Dallas, Texas with severe injuries and evidence of extensive physical and sexual abuse. Her social worker named her and put Eve into a foster home. After reaching the age of majority, Eve has a big desire to move to New York City, where she hopes to become a police officer. Throughout the series, her memories return, mostly through a series of nightmares, revealing a history of incestual rape and the patricide of her father, Richard Troy.

=== Roarke ===
- First Appearance: Naked in Death

In his mid-thirties, Roarke is an immigrant from Dublin, Ireland; in New York City, he is the CEO of Roarke Industries. He owns an old mansion off Central Park that he remodeled to his specifications with very high-tech security. He persuades Eve to move in with him in Glory in Death and then proposes at the end of the book.

=== Captain Ryan Feeney ===
- First Appearance: Naked in Death

Eve's former partner and the man who trained her. He no longer works Homicide, but is instead the captain of the Electronics Detection Division (EDD). Feeney likes to dress a bit messily and loves his electronics. He is a dedicated cop and a good husband to his wife, Sheila. They have several children and grandchildren. He is often seen eating a bag of candied nuts, which he may offer to Eve when they are deep in conversation about a case.

=== Mavis Freestone ===
- First Appearance: Naked in Death

Mavis is Eve's best and first real friend. The two met when Eve arrested her for being a con artist and they ended up becoming friends. Mavis is described as a tiny, pale woman who radically changes her appearance daily, sporting different lengths, styles, and colors of hair with often matching or contrasting eye color. She has an almost innocent personality which belies the very real street knowledge she possesses; she is also very loyal to Eve.

=== Lawrence Charles Summerset ===
- First Appearance: Naked in Death

Summerset is the major-domo of Roarke's home, and his most trusted friend (after Eve). He used to go by the name 'Basil Kolchek' back in Ireland in the 2030s. He and Eve have an adversarial relationship.

=== Commander Jack Whitney ===
- First Appearance: Naked in Death

Eve's police commander; her immediate superior. He is one of the few characters in the series, along with the Chief of the NYPSD, Tibble, who is identified as black. Eve respects him greatly. Whitney is a solid, excellent police officer, and for the most part is always on Eve's side. He has at least one daughter (a lawyer) with his wife, Anna Whitney, and endures stoically the parties his wife loves throwing. Surprising Eve, he gets along very well with Roarke and the two have, on rare occasions, smoked and drunk together.

=== Nadine Furst ===
- First Appearance: Naked in Death

Nadine is one of the intended victims of the murderer in Glory in Death, but is saved by Eve, who is the primary investigator on the case. She is an ambitious but ethical reporter, who will always protect her source. Nadine is a sharp dresser, a fact Eve finds odd.

=== Dr. Charlotte Mira ===
- First Appearance: Naked in Death

Mira is the resident psychiatrist and profiler for the NYPSD. She has several children with her husband, Dennis, and has grandchildren as well. She is a pretty and feminine woman whom Eve often consults on her cases. Eve loves Charlotte very much but has not admitted it to her face; nevertheless, Charlotte knows. Charlotte thinks of Eve as a daughter, a fact which annoyed Mira's own daughter at one point, and throughout the series has gotten Eve to open up to her more and more.

=== Officer (Detective) Delia Peabody ===
- First Appearance: Glory in Death
- Temporary aide in Glory and Immortal in Death
- Permanent aide: from Rapture in Death through to Imitation
- Partner: Promotion to Detective, third grade in Imitation in Death

Although her first name is Delia, she is referred to by her surname 'Peabody' throughout the books, as is standard for other police officers. Peabody has a very close relationship with Eve. Peabody comes from a family of "Free-Agers", which is a fictional extension of the New Age movement from the 1980s. Her family is peaceful and pacifistic, but Delia prefers exercising justice the police way. She is a responsible officer, but as the books continue, she becomes more confident in her cases and in teasing Eve, particularly about her sex life with McNab and her sexual fantasies.

=== Detective Ian McNab ===
- First Appearance: Vengeance in Death

Of a Scottish background, Ian is a detective in Feeney's Electronics Detection Division. He is particularly good with computers, though not as good as Roarke. Ian is a flashy dresser who, in Eve's words, "prances" rather than walks. Feeney describes him as a known candy thief, and he has been caught at least once pilfering candy bars from Eve's office.

=== Detective David Baxter ===
- First Appearance: Vengeance in Death

Another detective from Homicide. Baxter enjoys teasing Eve about anything he can, usually relating to her relationship with Roarke and associated changes; despite this teasing Roarke views Baxter as a solid cop and easygoing person.

=== Chief Medical Examiner Li Morris ===
- First Appearance: Rapture in Death

Chief Medical Examiner Morris is the medical examiner Eve requests on all of her high-priority cases. He is mentioned as having 'oddly exotic almond-shaped eyes', and sports a small tattoo of the Grim Reaper on his left pectoral. He has a long black ponytail, which he often ties back with fasteners that match his clothes. He plays the saxophone and sometimes plays gigs at various clubs. He listens to music while performing autopsies and calls Eve his prize pupil for her quick-witted deductions.
