= Memory in Death =

2006 novel by J. D. Robb

- First edition
- Author: J. D. Robb
- Language: English
- Series: in Death
- Genre: Crime novel
- Publisher: Putnam
- Publication date: January 2006
- Publication place: United States
- Media type: Print (Hardcover, Paperback)
- Pages: 375 pp
- ISBN: 0-425-21073-1
- OCLC: 70208966
- Preceded by: Origin in Death
- Followed by: Haunted in Death

Memory in Death (2006) is a novel by J. D. Robb. It is the twenty-second novel in the In Death series, preceding Haunted in Death.

== Plot summary ==
Following the events in Origin in Death, Lt. Eve Dallas only wants a break as Christmas nears, but her past is coming back to haunt her. A television news special about her and her husband Roarke's involvement in the destruction of the Icove center airs on national television, and in Texas, catches the eye of Trudy Lombard, who promptly comes to New York City with her son and her daughter-in-law. Lombard shows up at Eve's office, and Eve remembers everything about her.

Eve was taken in by Lombard as a foster child after she killed her father. Lombard was an abusive woman, who often made Eve go without food, clean the floors with a toothbrush, locked her in her bed room without light, and scrubbed her skin raw in ice cold baths, all the time telling her she deserved it because she was a 'filthy' little girl who'd already 'engaged in sexual relations' (referring to the beatings and rape committed by Eve's father) before the age of ten.

Eve realizes Lombard wants something, and her suspicions come true when Lombard tries to blackmail Roarke for $2 million. Roarke refuses and tell her to go back to Texas. The day after, Lombard is found dead. At first it seems like a classical murder; Lombard has been hit on the head by a blunt murder weapon and articles of clothing, her purse, and her tele-link are missing. However, Dallas does not believe it to be so clear a homicide, and while looking at all the former foster children taken in by Lombard, suspects Trudy Lombard's daughter in law, Zana Kline, who seems too innocent to have a hand in the murder; however, because there is no evidence pointing to her, Eve becomes extremely frustrated.

At the end of the book it is revealed that Zana is in fact one of the children Lombard had fostered, and had been playing the long con to get back at Lombard.
