= List of The New York Times number-one books of 2025 =

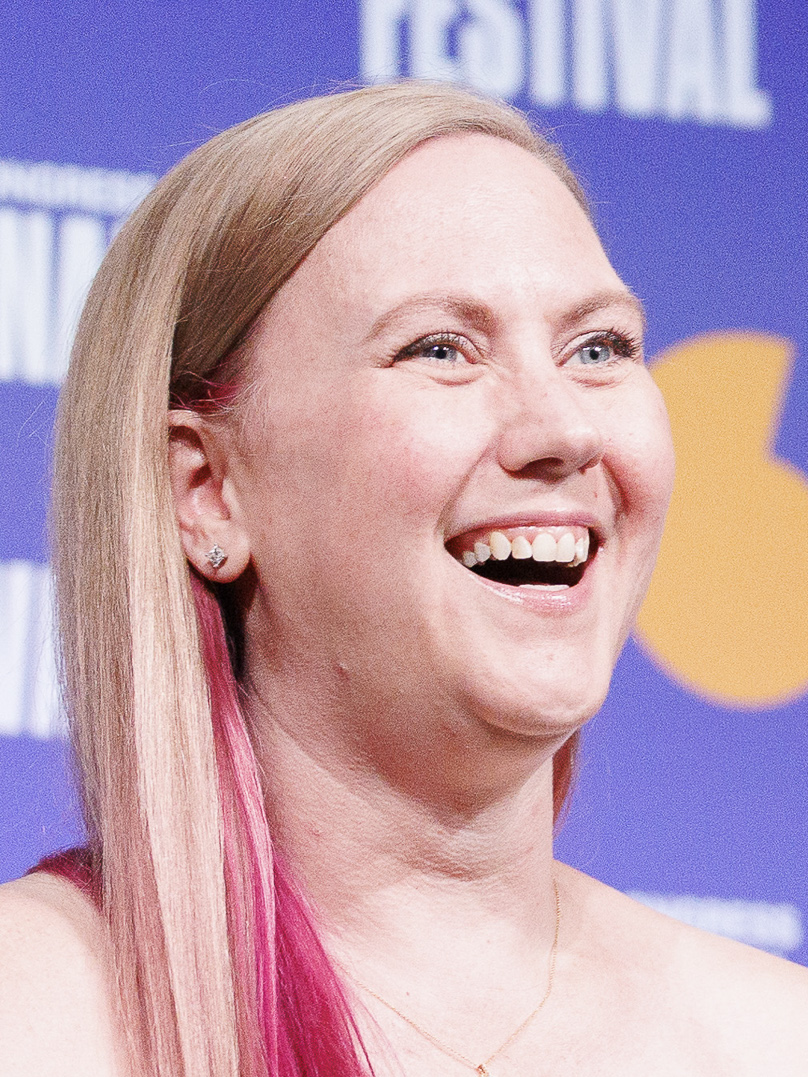
Rebecca Yarros was the most frequent weekly best-selling combined fiction author in 2025.

The American daily newspaper The New York Times publishes multiple weekly lists ranking the best-selling books in the United States. The lists are split into three genres—fiction, nonfiction and children's books. Both the fiction and nonfiction lists are further split into multiple lists.

== Fiction ==
The following list ranks the number-one best-selling fiction books, in the combined print and e-books category.

The most frequent weekly best seller of the year was Onyx Storm by Rebecca Yarros with 8 weeks at the top of the list, followed by The Widow by John Grisham with 4 weeks at the top of the list and James by Percival Everett with 3 weeks at the top of the list.

Issue date	Title	Author(s)	Publisher	Ref.
January 5	James	Percival Everett	Doubleday	
January 12	James	Percival Everett	Doubleday	
January 19	James	Percival Everett	Doubleday	
January 26	Fourth Wing	Rebecca Yarros	Red Tower Books	
February 2	Fourth Wing	Rebecca Yarros	Red Tower Books	
February 9	Onyx Storm	Rebecca Yarros	Red Tower Books	
February 16	Onyx Storm	Rebecca Yarros	Red Tower Books	
February 23	Onyx Storm	Rebecca Yarros	Red Tower Books	
March 2	Onyx Storm	Rebecca Yarros	Red Tower Books	
March 9	Onyx Storm	Rebecca Yarros	Red Tower Books	
March 16	Battle Mountain	C. J. Box	G. P. Putnam's Sons	
March 23	Onyx Storm	Rebecca Yarros	Red Tower Books	
March 30	Onyx Storm	Rebecca Yarros	Red Tower Books	
April 6	Onyx Storm	Rebecca Yarros	Red Tower Books	
April 13	Lethal Prey	John Sandford	G. P. Putnam's Sons	
April 20	Say You'll Remember Me	Abby Jimenez	Forever	
April 27	Enchantra	Kaylie Smith	Forever	
May 4	The Perfect Divorce	Jeneva Rose	Blackstone Publishing	
May 11	Great Big Beautiful Life	Emily Henry	Berkley	
May 18	25 Alive	James Patterson and Maxine Paetro	Little, Brown and Company	
May 25	The Tenant	Freida McFadden	Poisoned Pen Press	
June 1	A Curse Carved in Bone	Danielle L. Jensen	Del Rey	
June 8	Nightshade	Michael Connelly	Little, Brown and Company	
June 15	Never Flinch	Stephen King	Scribner	
June 22	Atmosphere	Taylor Jenkins Reid	Ballantine Books	
June 29	Caught Up	Navessa Allen	Slowburn	
July 6	Atmosphere	Taylor Jenkins Reid	Ballantine Books	
July 13	Don't Let Him In	Lisa Jewell	Atria Books	
July 20	Edge of Honor	Brad Thor	Emily Bestler Books	
July 27	Rose in Chains	Julie Soto	Forever	
August 3	An Inside Job	Daniel Silva	Harper	
August 10	The Hamptons Lawyer	James Patterson and Mike Lupica	Little, Brown and Company	
August 17	My Friends	Fredrik Backman	Atria Books	
August 24	Accomplice to the Villain	Hannah Nicole Maehrer	Red Tower Books	
August 31	We Are All Guilty Here	Karin Slaughter	William Morrow	
September 7	Quicksilver	Callie Hart	Forever	
September 14	Katabasis	R. F. Kuang	Harper Voyager	
September 21	Framed in Death	J. D. Robb	St. Martin's Press	
September 28	The Secret of Secrets	Dan Brown	Doubleday	
October 5	The Secret of Secrets	Dan Brown	Doubleday	
October 12	Alchemised	SenLinYu	Del Rey Books	
October 19	The Impossible Fortune	Richard Osman	Pamela Dorman Books	
October 26	Mate	Ali Hazelwood	Berkley	
November 2	Gone Before Goodbye	Reese Witherspoon and Harlan Coben	Grand Central Publishing	
November 9	The Widow	John Grisham	Doubleday	
November 16	The Black Wolf	Louise Penny	Minotaur	
November 23	The Widow	John Grisham	Doubleday	
November 30	Exit Strategy	Lee Child and Andrew Child	Bantam Books	
December 7	Brimstone	Callie Hart	Forever	
December 14	Brimstone	Callie Hart	Forever	
December 21	The Widow	John Grisham	Doubleday	
December 28	The Widow	John Grisham	Doubleday	

== Nonfiction ==
The following list ranks the number-one best-selling nonfiction books, in the combined print and e-books category.

The most frequent weekly best seller of the year was The Body Keeps the Score by Bessel van der Kolk with 6 weeks at the top of the list, followed by Nobody's Girl by Virginia Roberts Giuffre with 4 weeks at the top of the list.

Issue date	Title	Author(s)	Publisher	Ref.
January 5	The Backyard Bird Chronicles	Amy Tan	Alfred A. Knopf	
January 12	The Backyard Bird Chronicles	Amy Tan	Alfred A. Knopf	
January 19	The Anxious Generation	Jonathan Haidt	Penguin Press	
January 26	The House of My Mother	Shari Franke	Gallery Books	
February 2	The House of My Mother	Shari Franke	Gallery Books	
February 9	Hillbilly Elegy	J. D. Vance	Harper	
February 16	The Sirens' Call	Chris Hayes	Penguin Press	
February 23	Source Code	Bill Gates	Alfred A. Knopf	
March 2	Outlive	Peter Attia with Bill Gifford	Harmony	
March 9	The Technological Republic	Alexander C. Karp and Nicholas W. Zamiska	Crown Currency	
March 16	The Body Keeps the Score	Bessel van der Kolk	Penguin Books	
March 23	The House of My Mother	Shari Franke	Gallery Books	
March 30	Careless People	Sarah Wynn-Williams	Flatiron Books	
April 6	Everything Is Tuberculosis	John Green	Crash Course Books	
April 13	Everything Is Tuberculosis	John Green	Crash Course Books	
April 20	Fight	Jonathan Allen and Amie Parnes	William Morrow	
April 27	Fahrenheit-182	Mark Hoppus with Dan Ozzi	Dey Street Books	
May 4	Abundance	Ezra Klein and Derek Thompson	Avid Reader Press	
May 11	Matriarch	Tina Knowles with Kevin Carr O'Leary	One World	
May 18	The Fate of the Day	Rick Atkinson	Crown	
May 25	Big Dumb Eyes	Nate Bargatze	Grand Central Publishing	
June 1	Mark Twain	Ron Chernow	Penguin Press	
June 8	Original Sin	Jake Tapper and Alex Thompson	Penguin Press	
June 15	Original Sin	Jake Tapper and Alex Thompson	Penguin Press	
June 22	How Countries Go Broke	Ray Dalio	Avid Reader Press	
June 29	The Body Keeps the Score	Bessel van der Kolk	Penguin Books	
July 6	Behind the Badge	Johnny Joey Jones	Fox News Books	
July 13	Behind the Badge	Johnny Joey Jones	Fox News Books	
July 20	The Body Keeps the Score	Bessel van der Kolk	Penguin Books	
July 27	Butler	Salena Zito	Center Street	
August 3	The Idaho Four	James Patterson and Vicky Ward	Little, Brown and Company	
August 10	The Idaho Four	James Patterson and Vicky Ward	Little, Brown and Company	
August 17	On Power	Mark Levin	Threshold Editions	
August 24	Coming Up Short	Robert Reich	Alfred A. Knopf	
August 31	The Body Keeps the Score	Bessel van der Kolk	Penguin Books	
September 7	The Body Keeps the Score	Bessel van der Kolk	Penguin Books	
September 14	The Body Keeps the Score	Bessel van der Kolk	Penguin Books	
September 21	Sister Wife	Christine Brown Woolley	Gallery Books	
September 28	Confronting Evil	Bill O'Reilly and Josh Hammer	St. Martin's Press	
October 5	Poems & Prayers	Matthew McConaughey	Crown	
October 12	107 Days	Kamala Harris	Simon & Schuster	
October 19	107 Days	Kamala Harris	Simon & Schuster	
October 26	How to Test Negative for Stupid	John Kennedy	Broadside Books	
November 2	Under Siege	Eric Trump	Threshold Editions	
November 9	Nobody's Girl	Virginia Roberts Giuffre	Alfred A. Knopf	
November 16	Nobody's Girl	Virginia Roberts Giuffre	Alfred A. Knopf	
November 23	Heart Life Music	Kenny Chesney with Holly Gleason	William Morrow	
November 30	Nobody's Girl	Virginia Roberts Giuffre	Alfred A. Knopf	
December 7	Nobody's Girl	Virginia Roberts Giuffre	Alfred A. Knopf	
December 14	1929	Andrew Ross Sorkin	Viking	
December 21	1929	Andrew Ross Sorkin	Viking	
December 28	1929	Andrew Ross Sorkin	Viking	

== See also ==
- Publishers Weekly list of bestselling novels in the United States in the 2020s
