= List of The New York Times number-one books of 2023 =

The American daily newspaper The New York Times publishes multiple weekly lists ranking the best-selling books in the United States. The lists are split into three genres—fiction, nonfiction and children's books. Both the fiction and nonfiction lists are further split into multiple lists.

== Fiction ==
The following list ranks the number-one best-selling fiction books, in the combined print and e-books category.

The most frequent weekly best seller of the year was It Starts with Us by Colleen Hoover with 10 weeks at the top of the list, followed closely by Fourth Wing by Rebecca Yarros with 9 weeks. For a second consecutive year, Colleen Hoover was the most frequent weekly best-selling author with 14 weeks at the top of the list.

Issue date	Title	Author(s)	Publisher	Ref.
January 1	It Starts with Us	Colleen Hoover	Atria Books	
January 8	It Starts with Us	Colleen Hoover	Atria Books	
January 15	It Starts with Us	Colleen Hoover	Atria Books	
January 22	It Starts with Us	Colleen Hoover	Atria Books	
January 29	It Starts with Us	Colleen Hoover	Atria Books	
February 5	It Starts with Us	Colleen Hoover	Atria Books	
February 12	It Ends with Us	Colleen Hoover	Atria Books	
February 19	It Ends with Us	Colleen Hoover	Atria Books	
February 26	Encore in Death	J. D. Robb	St. Martin's Press	
March 5	It Starts with Us	Colleen Hoover	Atria Books	
March 12	Things We Hide from the Light	Lucy Score	Bloom Books	
March 19	Storm Watch	C. J. Box	G. P. Putnam's Sons	
March 26	It Starts with Us	Colleen Hoover	Atria Books	
April 2	I Will Find You	Harlan Coben	Grand Central Publishing	
April 9	It Starts with Us	Colleen Hoover	Atria Books	
April 16	Daisy Jones & the Six	Taylor Jenkins Reid	Ballantine Books	
April 23	It Starts with Us	Colleen Hoover	Atria Books	
April 30	Dark Angel	John Sandford	G. P. Putnam's Sons	
May 7	Simply Lies	David Baldacci	Grand Central Publishing	
May 14	Happy Place	Emily Henry	Berkley	
May 21	The 23rd Midnight	James Patterson and Maxine Paetro	Little, Brown and Company	
May 28	Happy Place	Emily Henry	Berkley	
June 4	Only the Dead	Jack Carr	Emily Bestler Books	
June 11	Identity	Nora Roberts	St. Martin's Press	
June 18	Happy Place	Emily Henry	Berkley	
June 25	Cross Down	James Patterson and Brendan DuBois	Little, Brown and Company	
July 2	The Five-Star Weekend	Elin Hilderbrand	Little, Brown and Company	
July 9	The Five-Star Weekend	Elin Hilderbrand	Little, Brown and Company	
July 16	Too Late	Colleen Hoover	Grand Central Publishing	
July 23	Too Late	Colleen Hoover	Grand Central Publishing	
July 30	Fourth Wing	Rebecca Yarros	Red Tower Books	
August 6	The Collector	Daniel Silva	Harper	
August 13	Fourth Wing	Rebecca Yarros	Red Tower Books	
August 20	Tom Lake	Ann Patchett	Harper	
August 27	Fourth Wing	Rebecca Yarros	Red Tower Books	
September 3	Tom Lake	Ann Patchett	Harper	
September 10	Fourth Wing	Rebecca Yarros	Red Tower Books	
September 17	Fourth Wing	Rebecca Yarros	Red Tower Books	
September 24	Holly	Stephen King	Scribner	
October 1	Code Red	Kyle Mills	Emily Bestler Books	
October 8	The Last Devil to Die	Richard Osman	Pamela Dorman Books	
October 15	The Running Grave	Robert Galbraith	Mulholland Books	
October 22	Judgement Prey	John Sandford	G. P. Putnam's Sons	
October 29	Fourth Wing	Rebecca Yarros	Red Tower Books	
November 5	The Exchange	John Grisham	Doubleday	
November 12	The Secret	Lee Child and Andrew Child	Delacorte Press	
November 19	Dirty Thirty	Janet Evanovich	Atria Books	
November 26	Iron Flame	Rebecca Yarros	Red Tower Books	
December 3	Iron Flame	Rebecca Yarros	Red Tower Books	
December 10	Iron Flame	Rebecca Yarros	Red Tower Books	
December 17	Fourth Wing	Rebecca Yarros	Red Tower Books	
December 24	Fourth Wing	Rebecca Yarros	Red Tower Books	
December 31	Fourth Wing	Rebecca Yarros	Red Tower Books	

== Nonfiction ==
The following list ranks the number-one best-selling nonfiction books, in the combined print and e-books category.

Issue date	Title	Author(s)	Publisher	Ref.
January 1	The Light We Carry	Michelle Obama	Crown	
January 8	The Light We Carry	Michelle Obama	Crown	
January 15	The Light We Carry	Michelle Obama	Crown	
January 22	The Light We Carry	Michelle Obama	Crown	
January 29	Spare	Prince Harry	Random House	
February 5	Spare	Prince Harry	Random House	
February 12	Spare	Prince Harry	Random House	
February 19	Spare	Prince Harry	Random House	
February 26	Spare	Prince Harry	Random House	
March 5	Spare	Prince Harry	Random House	
March 12	Spare	Prince Harry	Random House	
March 19	The Courage to Be Free	Ron DeSantis	Broadside Books	
March 26	Spare	Prince Harry	Random House	
April 2	Saved	Benjamin Hall	Harper	
April 9	Poverty, by America	Matthew Desmond	Crown	
April 16	Outlive	Peter Attia with Bill Gifford	Harmony	
April 23	Outlive	Peter Attia with Bill Gifford	Harmony	
April 30	Outlive	Peter Attia with Bill Gifford	Harmony	
May 7	The Wager	David Grann	Doubleday	
May 14	The Wager	David Grann	Doubleday	
May 21	The Wager	David Grann	Doubleday	
May 28	Spare	Prince Harry	Random House	
June 4	The Wager	David Grann	Doubleday	
June 11	Killers of the Flower Moon	David Grann	Doubleday	
June 18	The Wager	David Grann	Doubleday	
June 25	Pageboy	Elliot Page	Flatiron Books	
July 2	The Wager	David Grann	Doubleday	
July 9	Outlive	Peter Attia with Bill Gifford	Harmony	
July 16	Outlive	Peter Attia with Bill Gifford	Harmony	
July 23	Killers of the Flower Moon	David Grann	Doubleday	
July 30	Beyond the Story	BTS and Myeongseok Kang	Flatiron Books	
August 6	American Prometheus	Kai Bird and Martin J. Sherwin	Vintage Books	
August 13	American Prometheus	Kai Bird and Martin J. Sherwin	Vintage Books	
August 20	American Prometheus	Kai Bird and Martin J. Sherwin	Vintage Books	
August 27	American Prometheus	Kai Bird and Martin J. Sherwin	Vintage Books	
September 3	American Prometheus	Kai Bird and Martin J. Sherwin	Vintage Books	
September 10	Killers of the Flower Moon	David Grann	Doubleday	
September 17	Killers of the Flower Moon	David Grann	Doubleday	
September 24	Killers of the Flower Moon	David Grann	Doubleday	
October 1	Elon Musk	Walter Isaacson	Simon & Schuster	
October 8	The Democrat Party Hates America	Mark Levin	Threshold Editions	
October 15	Enough	Cassidy Hutchinson	Simon & Schuster	
October 22	Going Infinite	Michael Lewis	W. W. Norton & Company	
October 29	Killers of the Flower Moon	David Grann	Doubleday	
November 5	Killers of the Flower Moon	David Grann	Doubleday	
November 12	The Woman in Me	Britney Spears	Gallery Books	
November 19	The Woman in Me	Britney Spears	Gallery Books	
November 26	The Woman in Me	Britney Spears	Gallery Books	
December 3	Friends, Lovers, and the Big Terrible Thing	Matthew Perry	Flatiron Books	
December 10	The Woman in Me	Britney Spears	Gallery Books	
December 17	The Woman in Me	Britney Spears	Gallery Books	
December 24	Oath and Honor	Liz Cheney	Little, Brown and Company	
December 31	Oath and Honor	Liz Cheney	Little, Brown and Company	

== See also ==
- Publishers Weekly list of bestselling novels in the United States in the 2020s
