= Publishers Weekly list of bestselling novels in the United States in the 2020s =

This is a list of bestselling novels in the United States in the 2020s, as determined by Publishers Weekly. The list features the most popular novels of each year from 2020 through to 2029.

== 2020 ==
1. A Promised Land by Barack Obama
2. Midnight Sun by Stephenie Meyer
3. Dog Man: Grime and Punishment by Dav Pilkey
4. Too Much and Never Enough by Mary L. Trump
5. The Ballad of Songbirds and Snakes by Suzanne Collins
6. Where the Crawdads Sing by Delia Owens
7. Untamed by Glennon Doyle
8. Diary of a Wimpy Kid: The Deep End by Jeff Kinney
9. White Fragility by Robin DiAngelo
10. The Boy, the Mole, the Fox and the Horse by Charlie Mackesy

== 2021 ==
1. Dog Man: Mothering Heights by Dav Pilkey
2. American Marxism by Mark R. Levin
3. Diary of a Wimpy Kid: Big Shot by Jeff Kinney
4. The Boy, the Mole, the Fox and the Horse by Charlie Mackesy
5. Atomic Habits by James Clear
6. It Ends with Us by Colleen Hoover
7. The Very Hungry Caterpillar by Eric Carle
8. Oh, the Places You'll Go! by Dr. Seuss
9. The Four Agreements by Don Miguel Ruiz
10. The Four Winds by Kristin Hannah

== 2022 ==
1. It Ends with Us by Colleen Hoover
2. Verity by Colleen Hoover
3. It Starts with Us by Colleen Hoover
4. Where the Crawdads Sing by Delia Owens
5. Ugly Love by Colleen Hoover
6. Atomic Habits by James Clear
7. The Seven Husbands of Evelyn Hugo by Taylor Jenkins Reid
8. Reminders of Him by Colleen Hoover
9. November 9 by Colleen Hoover
10. Diary of a Wimpy Kid: Diper Överlöde by Jeff Kinney

== 2023 ==
1. It Ends with Us by Colleen Hoover
2. It Starts with Us by Colleen Hoover
3. Spare by Prince Harry
4. Fourth Wing by Rebecca Yarros
5. Atomic Habits by James Clear
6. Dog Man: Twenty Thousand Fleas Under the Sea by Dav Pilkey
7. Iron Flame by Rebecca Yarros
8. Lessons in Chemistry by Bonnie Garmus
9. Verity by Colleen Hoover
10. The Woman in Me by Britney Spears

== 2024 ==
1. The Women by Kristin Hannah
2. A Court of Thorns and Roses by Sarah J. Maas
3. Dog Man: The Scarlet Shredder by Dav Pilkey
4. The Housemaid by Freida McFadden
5. Atomic Habits by James Clear
6. It Ends with Us by Colleen Hoover
7. Iron Flame by Rebecca Yarros
8. Fourth Wing by Rebecca Yarros
9. A Court of Mist and Fury by Sarah J. Maas
10. It Starts with Us by Colleen Hoover

== 2025 ==
1. The Let Them Theory by Mel Robbins
2. Sunrise on the Reaping by Suzanne Collins
3. Onyx Storm by Rebecca Yarros
4. The Housemaid by Freida McFadden
5. Diary of a Wimpy Kid: Partypooper by Jeff Kinney
6. Dog Man: Big Jim Believes by Dav Pilkey
7. Atomic Habits by James Clear
8. Dog Man: Big Jim Begins by Dav Pilkey
9. The Secret of Secrets by Dan Brown
10. Fourth Wing by Rebecca Yarros
