= David Luu =

American pediatric cardiac surgeon

- Born: David Luu
- Education: University of Montpellier; University of Antilles-Guyane
- Years active: 2006–present
- Medical career
- Profession: Pediatric cardiac surgeon Founder of Hearty, Juisci, and Longevity Docs Founder of The Heart Fund
- Field: Pediatric cardiac surgery, Longevity medicine, Health technology
- Institutions: Marie-Lannelongue Hospital; Necker Hospital; Icahn School of Medicine at Mount Sinai
- Sub-specialties: Congenital heart disease, Preventive health, Longevity care
- Research: Medical imaging, Nanomedicine, Artificial intelligence

David Luu is a French pediatric cardiac surgeon, entrepreneur, and philanthropist known for his work in pediatric cardiac surgery and longevity medicine. He is the founder of Longevity Docs, Hearty, Juisci, and the founding chairman of The Heart Fund.

== Early life and education ==
David Luu graduated from the University of Montpellier in 2006 and completed a residency in cardiothoracic surgery at the University of Antilles-Guyane in 2011. He pursued a fellowship in pediatric cardiac surgery at Marie-Lannelongue Hospital in 2012 and served as Chief Resident at Necker Hospital in Paris. Luu also trained in trauma, reconstructive, and general surgery at Harvard Medical School, the University of Miami Miller School of Medicine, and the University of Southern California. He worked as a research coordinator at the Aortic Center of Lenox Hill Hospital in New York City.

== Career ==
Luu started his career in pediatric cardiac surgery, focusing on congenital heart diseases, before expanding into longevity medicine and preventive care.

In 2014, Luu co-founded NYClinic in partnership with NYC Surgical to provide preventive care. In 2021, Luu founded Hearty, a longevity medicine platform offering diagnostic and longevity care services. He also established the Hearty Longevity Lounge in Sag Harbor to promote longevity education and address health topics.

Luu co-founded Marché Health, a digital health marketplace connecting providers, payers, biopharma, and innovators to enhance the adoption of digital health technologies.

He co-founded Juisci, an artificial intelligence-driven platform healthcare professionals. In 2024, he established Longevity Docs, a global network of physicians with the mission to democratize longevity medicine and improve human healthspan through community, education and research.

Luu is a member of the advisory board of the BioMedical Engineering and Imaging Institute (BMEII) at the Icahn School of Medicine at Mount Sinai, where he contributes to research in medical imaging, nanomedicine, and artificial intelligence.

Luu has spoken at conferences, including the Web Summit, World Heart Federation Summit, United Nations World Humanitarian Summit, Life Summit, Global Wellness Summit, and Longevity Summit. He has participated in the Founders Longevity Forum, discussing biomarkers of aging.

Luu also served as chairman of the junior committee of the European Society for Cardiovascular and Endovascular Surgery (ESCVS).

== Philanthropy ==
In 2010, Luu founded The Heart Fund, a nonprofit providing cardiac care in underserved regions. The organization conducts mobile clinics, open-heart surgeries, and preventive programs and is accredited by the United Nations Economic and Social Council (ECOSOC).

In 2012, Luu led a mission to Haiti, accompanied by public figures such as Jimmy Jean-Louis and Alina Baikova, performing surgeries for children in need. The Heart Fund launched "The Heart Jet," a medical plane delivering cardiological care to vulnerable populations, supported by figures such as Leonardo DiCaprio, Paris Hilton, Gary Dourdan, Akon, and Didier Drogba.

Luu raised funds for the Generous People Gala at the Cannes Film Festival, where Moncler CEO Remo Ruffini provided his superyacht as the venue for The Heart Fund’s benefit.

In 2015, Luu and The Heart Fund, in collaboration with the Didier Drogba Foundation, introduced "The Heart Mobile" program in Ivory Coast, which has since provided screenings and surgeries to over 5,000 patients.

Luu’s organization has partnered with the Amrita Institute of Medical Sciences in India to provide free surgeries and endovascular treatments for children with congenital heart defects. Collaborating with UPL, The Heart Fund operates a second mobile clinic in Ivory Coast, delivering cardiovascular care, health education, and medical training to underserved rural areas. and winning the World Heart Federation Best Prevention Campaign Award.

== Personal life ==
David Luu resides in New York City with his wife, Moana Luu, and their son.
