= The Bloodthirsty Bride Devours the King =

Japanese manga series

- Manga visual

血に飢えた花嫁は王を喰らう (Chi ni Ueta Hanayome wa Ō o Kurau)
- Genre: Dark romance; Romantic fantasy
- Manga
- Written by: Shiki
- Illustrated by: Yū Shinonome
- Published by: Honcomics
- Magazine: Mecha Comic; en-dolphin
- Original run: April 10, 2026 – present
- Volumes: 4
- Anime television series
- Directed by: Mariko Iwazaki
- Produced by: Kazuya Takahashi
- Written by: Shiki
- Music by: Kujira Yumemi
- Studio: Imagica Infos; Imageworks Studio
- Original run: 2027 – scheduled

The Bloodthirsty Bride Devours the King (Japanese: 血に飢えた花嫁は王を喰らう, Hepburn: Chi ni Ueta Hanayome wa Ō o Kurau) is a Japanese manga series released as a webtoon written by Shiki and illustrated by Yū Shinonome. It has been serialized online since April 2026. A "light anime" television series adaptation produced by Imagica Infos and Imageworks Studio is set to premiere in 2027.

== Plot ==
In an age of endless war, Princess-Priestess Kate of the Kingdom of Albe absorbs the dormant power of the Progenitor Vampire to defend her homeland from invading enemy forces. Although her newfound power saves her nation, it turns her into a formidable supernatural threat.

To protect her people from lingering political threats and handle the volatile power within her, Kate proposes a strategic contract marriage to Luka, the ruler of the continent's dominant military power. In exchange for political stability and security, Kate offers Luka her immense vampire power. However, feeding on blood creates a intense aphrodisiac effect, driving both Kate and the vampire-hating king to navigate their primal instincts alongside their political contract.

== Characters ==
Kate (ケイト)
The Princess-Priestess of Albe who hosted the spirit/power of the Progenitor Vampire to repel an invading army.
Luca (ルカ)
The king of the continent's most powerful empire, who harbors a deep hatred for vampires but accepts a contract marriage with Kate for strategic dominance.

== Media ==
=== Manga ===
The series is written by Shiki and illustrated by Yū Shinonome, and began serialization online on April 10, 2026, with four volumes released so far.

=== Anime ===
On November 2, 2026, a "light anime" television series adaptation was announced. The series will be produced by Imagica Infos and Imageworks Studio and directed by Mariko Iwazaki, with Kazuya Takahashi credited as production supervision, Shiki also handling series composition, and Kujira Yumemi composing the music. It is set to premiere in 2027.
