= Kimberly Lemming =

Author

- Occupation: Novelist
- Writing career
- Years active: 2021–present
- Genre: Romantic fantasy
- Notable works: That Time I Got Drunk and Saved a Demon; That Time I Got Drunk and Saved a Human; I Got Abducted by Aliens and Now I'm Trapped in a Rom-Com

Kimberly Lemming is an author of romantic fantasy novels. Her novels include That Time I Got Drunk and Saved a Demon (2021), That Time I Got Drunk and Saved a Human (2023), and I Got Abducted by Aliens and Now I'm Trapped in a Rom-Com (2025).

== Biography ==
Lemming began writing in 2021 and self-published her books. After her works became popular on social media platforms TikTok and Discord, the publishers Jo Fletcher Books and Orbit Books began working with her. Her romantic fantasies That Time I Got Drunk and Saved a Demon and That Time I Got Drunk and Saved a Human were published in 2021 and 2023, respectively. The first novel, which she first self-published, was published by Orbit in 2024. A 2023 Polygon article described her works as "self-referential and lighthearted with a healthy dose of smutty spice — a combination that keeps readers returning".

For Lemming's 2025 novel published by Berkley Books, I Got Abducted by Aliens and Now I'm Trapped in a Rom-Com, among others, fantasy artist Mike Pape illustrated the novel cover. The novel features a throuple (a relationship between three partners) of aliens and humans.

== Bibliography ==
=== Mead Mishaps series ===
- That Time I Got Drunk and Saved a Demon (2021)
- That Time I Got Drunk and Yeeted a Love Potion at a Werewolf (2022)
- That Time I Got Drunk and Saved a Human (2023)

=== Cosmic Chaos series ===
- I Got Abducted by Aliens and Now I'm Trapped in a Rom-Com (2025)
- I Punched an Alien and Now We're in Couples Therapy (2026)
