= Callie Hart =

British romance and fantasy author

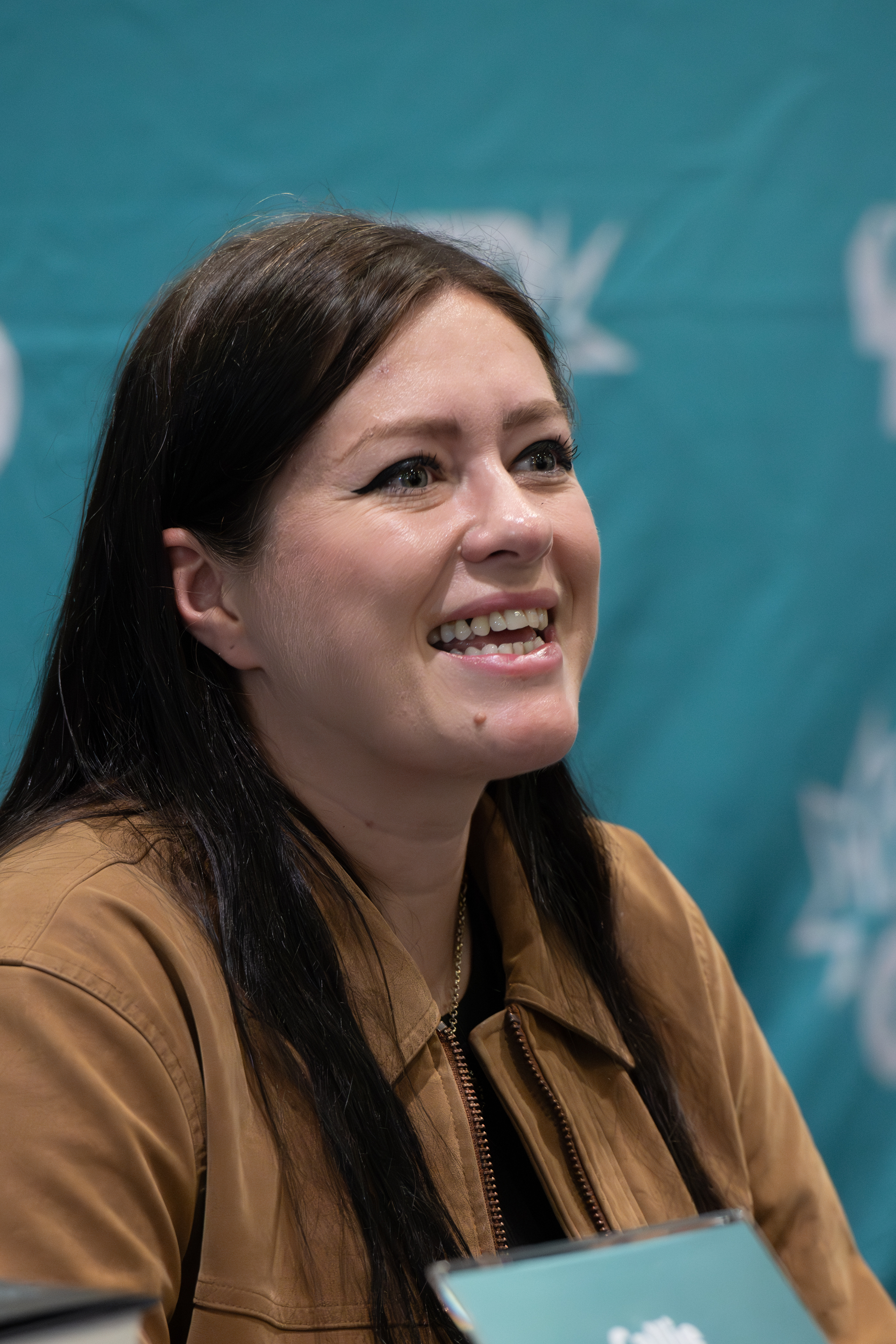
- Callie Hart at MCM Comic Con London, May 2025
- Born: 5 December 1983 (age 42); Truro, Cornwall, England
- Occupation: Novelist
- Writing career
- Pen name: Callie Hart; Frankie Rose
- Period: 2012–present
- Genres: Dark romance, Romantasy, New adult fiction
- Notable works: Fae & Alchemy series (2024); Blood & Roses series (2014)
- Website: calliehart.com

Callie Hart (born 5 December 1983) is a British author of romance and fantasy fiction. She is best known for her Fae & Alchemy series. Her novel Quicksilver (2024) became a #1 New York Times and Sunday Times bestseller. The novel became a BookTok phenomenon and is set to be adapted for film by Netflix.

== Early life ==
Hart was born in Truro, Cornwall. She cited her grandmother as an early influence, recalling how they would write poems and limericks together.

== Career ==
=== Early work ===
Hart began her writing career as a self-published author. She began her career writing as Frankie Rose, starting with her debut novel Sovereign Hope in 2012. Following her Hope series was Raksha in 2013, which was re-released as Halo in 2014.

Hart's debut novel under the pen name Callie Hart titled Deviant, the first book in the Blood & Roses series, was published in February 2014. The Blood & Roses box set became a USA Today bestseller in 2015. She went on to write more than 40 books across multiple series in the dark romance and new adult fiction genres.

=== Quicksilver and mainstream success ===
In June 2024, Hart self-published Quicksilver, her first novel in the romantasy genre, which combines elements of fantasy and romance. The novel follows Saeris Fane, a young woman with alchemical powers who is transported to a realm of Fae beings and becomes embroiled in a centuries-long conflict.

Hart described the novel as her "Hail Mary" after previous releases had underperformed financially. She sent early copies to BookTok content creators, which proved a successful strategy, and the novel's mentions on TikTok accumulated over three million views within the first two months.

Via a 10-way auction in September 2024, Hodderscape (a Hodder & Stoughton imprint) acquired the traditional publishing rights to Quicksilver. Published in December 2024, Quicksilver debuted at #1 on The New York Times bestseller list and reached #1 on the Sunday Times bestseller list. Quicksilver was nominated for the Goodreads Choice Awards in the Best Romantasy category in 2024. The second novel in the trilogy Brimstone followed in 2025 and debuted at #1 on the UK charts.

In 2025, Hodder & Stoughton acquired the rights to publish Hart's 2014 series Blood & Roses.

== Literary influences ==
Hart has cited J. R. R. Tolkien's The Lord of the Rings and Frank Herbert's Dune as major influences on her work. She has described drawing inspiration from Herbert's work for the desert landscape of Zilvaren in Quicksilver, and from Tolkien for the novel's world-building and naming conventions. Other authors she has mentioned as influences include Patrick Rothfuss, George R. R. Martin, Joe Abercrombie, and Tamsyn Muir.

== Adaptation ==
In December 2024, Netflix acquired the film rights to Quicksilver in a competitive auction with a seven-figure deal. Elizabeth Cantillon of The Cantillon Company was attached to produce. Hart is set to serve as executive producer on the project; she stated it was her priority to maintain the adult tone of the source material in the adaptation. As of November 2025, a screenplay had been completed and the production was seeking a director.

== Personal life ==
Hart moved to California in the 2010s. She has also lived in Australia.

== Bibliography ==
=== Hope trilogy ===
1. Sovereign Hope (2012)
2. Eternal Hope (2012)
3. Lost Hope (2014)

=== Blood & Fire series ===
1. Halo (2014) (originally titled Raksha)
2. Radicals (2014)

=== Blood & Roses series ===
1. Deviant (2014)
2. Fracture (2014)
3. Burn (2014)
4. Fallen (2014)
5. Twisted (2014)
6. Collateral (2014)

=== Four Seasons series ===
1. Winter (2015)
2. Summer (2016)

=== Dead Man's Ink trilogy ===
1. Rebel (2015)
2. Rogue (2015)
3. Ransom (2016)

=== Chaos & Ruin trilogy ===
1. Violent Things (2015)
2. Savage Things (2016)
3. Wicked Things (2017)

=== Dirty Nasty Freaks trilogy ===
1. Dirty (2018)
2. Nasty (2018)
3. Freaks (2018)

=== Roma series ===
1. Roma King (2018)
2. Roma Queen (2019)

=== Crooked Sinners / Raleigh Rebels series ===
1. Riot House (2019)
2. Riot Rules (2020)
3. Riot Act (2021)
4. Riot Reunion (2023)

=== Fae & Alchemy trilogy ===
1. Quicksilver (2024)
2. Brimstone (2025)
3. Untitled third book (2027)

=== Standalone novels ===
- Between Here and the Horizon (2016)
- Vice (2016)
- Rooke (2017)
- Road to Ruin (2017) with Jonny James
- Mr North (2017)
- Black Moon Rising (2018)
- Calico (2018)
- Requiem (2022)

=== Short stories, novellas and serials ===
- in Owned (2014)
- Badlands (2015) (novella)
- Hell's Kitchen (2015) with Lili St Germain
- in My Sweet Villaintine (2017)
- in Bully Me: Class of 2020 (2020)
- Deviant chapter in Kiss Me in the Dark (2020)
