= Gone Before Goodbye =

2025 novel by Reese Witherspoon and Harlan Coben

- First edition hardcover
- Author: Reese Witherspoon & Harlan Coben
- Language: English
- Genre: Thriller fiction
- Publisher: Grand Central Publishing
- Publication date: October 14, 2025
- Publication place: United States
- Pages: 352
- ISBN: 9781538774700

Gone Before Goodbye is a thriller novel by American authors Reese Witherspoon and Harlan Coben. It was published by Grand Central Publishing on October 14, 2025. The novel centers a former army combat surgeon who finds herself drawn into a conspiracy related to a charity she set up with her late husband. It is Witherspoon's debut novel and Coben's debut collaborative novel. It became a New York Times number-one best-seller shortly after release.

== Background ==
Witherspoon came up with the novel out of her desire for a thriller that centers on a woman with a unique skill set, rather than being about her sex appeal or violence. She has described growing up watching James Bond movies and wondering why all the women were wearing bikinis. Her mother was a military nurse and her father was a military surgeon, and these lines of work helped inspire the characters. Her father worked shortly after the Vietnam War, and would tell her stories about trauma surgeries. She reached out to Harlan Coben to help her write the novel. It was Witherspoon's first novel and Coben's first book collaboration. They communicated through emails and text messages, and would meet in person every two or three weeks at Coben's apartment to construct the novel. Coben would then write and send Witherspoon chapters, and Witherspoon would give feedback. Coben plotted the key moments of the novel, while Witherspoon did much of the research. Coben had originally written a different ending, but Witherspoon convinced him to change it.

== Synopsis ==
Maggie McCabe is an army combat surgeon who had teamed up after college with her husband, Marc Adams, and her friend, Trace, to create WorldCures Alliance, a charity dedicated to providing medical services for the most impoverished. They created a prototype of an artificial heart called THUMPR7, which they were convinced would change the world by extending the lives of millions. Later, however, Marc was killed in a rebel attack on a refugee camp in Libya, Trace went missing alongside the prototype, and Maggie lost her medical license. She is now deep in debt and uses a chatbot to interact with her late husband. Her former professor Evan Barlow, who is now a celebrity plastic surgeon, approaches her with a job to perform plastic surgery for a Russian client willing to pay her millions. She finds herself performing an off-the-record breast augmentation in Rublevka on Nadia, the mistress of billionaire Oleg Ragoravich. From there, Maggie is drawn into a conspiracy related to WorldCures Alliance.

== Reception ==
The novel reached the top spot of the New York Times Combined Print & E-Book Fiction Best-Seller List. It spent seven weeks on the list.

The novel won an Audie Award for Mystery. It was nominated for a Goodreads Choice Award for Mystery & Thriller.

Kirkus Reviews called it "not the most thrilling thriller", but stated that the role of artificial intelligence in the novel gives it "pathos and interest". Marc Weingarten of the Los Angeles Times called it a "fun ride" that "compels you and repels you in equal measure", but stated that "a few of its particulars are too far-fetched to swallow."
