= Entangled Publishing =

Book publisher

- Founded: 2011; 15 years ago
- Founder: Liz Pelletier
- Country of origin: United States
- Imprints: Red Tower Books, Mischief Books, Mayhem Books, Amara, Little Lark
- Official website: www.entangledinromance.com

Entangled Publishing is a book publisher specializing in romantasy. It is best known for publishing Rebecca Yarros' Empyrean series and was listed at number 50 on Fast Company's list of the World's 50 Most Innovative Companies of 2025.

== History ==
Entangled Publishing was founded in 2011 by Liz Pelletier, who previously worked as a software engineer.

In November 2022, Entangled Publishing announced an imprint, for romantic fantasy and science fiction, called Red Tower Books. The announcement came with a schedule of seven titles due for release in 2023, which included Yarros' Fourth Wing.

In February 2023, Entangled Publishing announced a new imprint dedicated to children's literature scheduled to launch later that fall.

In February 2025, Entangled Publishing announced two new imprints for young adult literature, Mischief Books and Mayhem Books. Mayhem Books was created with a focus on teenagers older than age 16 and had initial releases scheduled for fall, while Mischief Books was planned for launch in 2026 with an age range of 13 and older.

In March 2025, it was announced that Entangled Publishing would be partnering with Ten Speed Graphic and Piatkus to adapt Yarros' Empyrean series into the graphic novel medium.

== Deluxe editions ==
In 2023, ahead of the release of Yarros' Fourth Wing, Entangled Publishing designed a deluxe edition of the novel "with a bold metallic cover and black sprayed edges featuring dragons" and printed 115,000 copies, which sold out within a week's time. Entangled Publishing then designed a deluxe edition for Iron Flame with a print run of a million copies, which sold out as well. Onyx Storm, the third book in Yarros' Empyrean series, was scheduled to have a print run of two million deluxe edition copies.

The New York Times called the decision "an expensive gamble" but one that paid off and affected the publishing industry's approach to its printing, among other factors: "After gaining popularity with romance and fantasy readers, heavily adorned editions have spread throughout the publishing industry. Publishers are investing in colorful patterned edges, metallic foil covers, reversible jackets, elaborate artwork on the endpapers, ribbon bookmarks and bonus content."

== Controversy ==
=== Plagiarism allegations ===
In March 2022, Lynne Freeman, a romantasy writer from Anchorage, Alaska, filed a lawsuit in the Southern District of New York against literary agent Emily Sylvan Kim and Entangled Publishing on the claim that her 2010 manuscript, Blue Moon Rising, was stolen by Kim and subsequently appropriated for Tracy Wolff's Crave series, published by Entangled Publishing. Freeman and Kim had tried to pitch Blue Moon Rising for several years until parting ways in 2014, and in 2021, Freeman read Crave, after which she claimed numerous similarities between it and Blue Moon Rising.

Universal Studios was also implicated for optioning rights to the aforementioned series.

=== Misprinting issues ===
Upon the release of Iron Flame's deluxe edition, several people reported "damaged and bleeding sprayed book edges, typos, missing pages, and upside-down pages and endpapers in certain copies," after which Entangled Publishing issued refunds.

Ahead of its print run of Onyx Storm, Entangled Publishing announced that it would take "extra care" to prevent any future misprintings.

== Imprints ==
- Amara
- Little Lark
- Mischief Books
- Mayhem Books
- Red Tower Books
