= Sam Lansky =

American journalist, author and editor

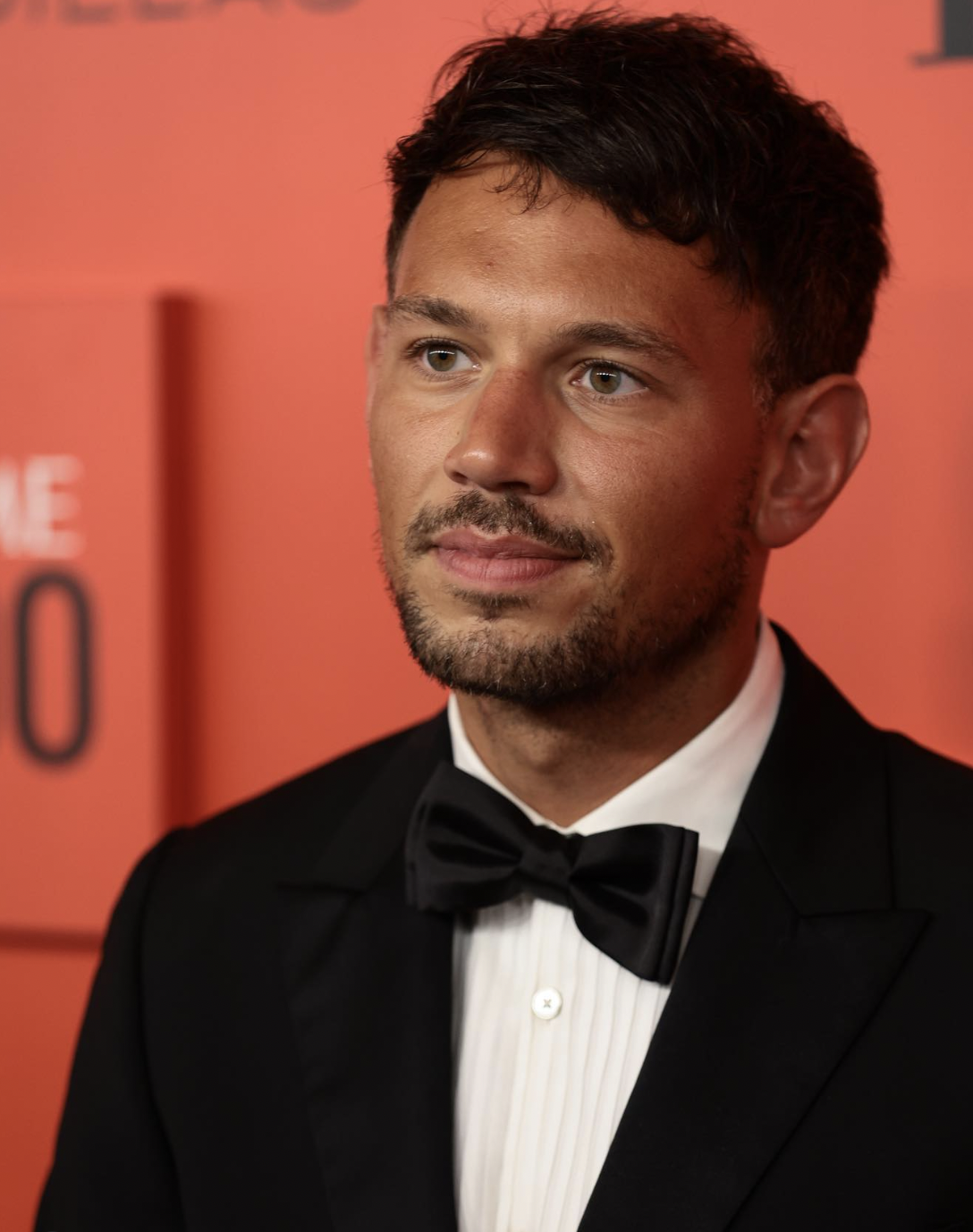
- Education: The New School
- Occupation: Screenwriter

Sam Lansky is an American journalist, author and screenwriter.

== Early life ==
Lansky was born and raised in Portland, Oregon. After his parents divorced, he lived with his father in Manhattan and attended the Dwight School. Lansky was forcibly entered into a wilderness rehabilitation in Utah at the age of seventeen.

== Career ==
Lansky studied at Vassar College and The New School, where he graduated with a degree in creative writing. Subsequently, he worked as a freelance music critic, contributing to New York magazine, The Atlantic, Esquire, and Out, among others. Lansky joined the editorial staff of Time in 2014. He became their West Coast editor in 2018. Lansky interviewed and profiled singer-songwriter Taylor Swift for Time after she was picked as the Person of the Year in 2023.

In 2016, he released his first book The Gilded Razor, a memoir of his troubled teenage years. Lansky's debut novel, Broken People, was published by Hanover Square Press in 2020.

Lansky ghostwrote singer Britney Spears' 2023 memoir, The Woman in Me. He also ghostwrote venture capitalist Amy Griffin's 2025 memoir The Tell, which allegedly describes her childhood and sexual assault experiences. Lansky was sued in California state court for his role in drafting the memoir, which allegedly stole the childhood sexual experiences of another woman.

Lansky executive produced the 2024 drama film I Wish You All the Best and co-wrote the 2025 slasher film I Know What You Did Last Summer.

== Personal life ==
As of 2018, Lansky lives in Los Angeles.

== Bibliography ==
- The Gilded Razor (Gallery Books, 2016)
- Broken People (Hanover Square Press, 2020)
- The Woman in Me by Britney Spears (Gallery Books, 2023)

== Filmography ==
- I Wish You All the Best (2024)
- I Know What You Did Last Summer (2025)
