= Pageboy (memoir) =

2023 memoir by Elliot Page

- First edition cover
- Author: Elliot Page
- Language: English
- Genre: Memoir
- Publisher: Flatiron Books
- Publication date: June 6, 2023
- Publication place: United States
- Pages: 288
- ISBN: 978-1250878359

Pageboy is a memoir by actor, producer, and activist Elliot Page. It was published on June 6, 2023. Upon release, the book debuted atop The New York Times Best Seller list for Nonfiction.

== Reception ==
The Washington Post called it "enthralling". The New York Times called Pageboy "brutally honest".

The San Diego Union-Tribune wrote, "In the end, it didn't live up to the hype. But it's better that it doesn't, because it humanizes the larger-than-life subject."

== See also ==
- The New York Times Nonfiction Best Sellers of 2023
