= Harmony Books =

Imprint of the Crown Publishing Group

- Parent company: Crown Publishing Group (Penguin Random House)
- Founded: 1972
- Founder: Bruce Harris
- Country of origin: United States
- Headquarters location: New York City
- Key people: Tina Constable, Publisher, Heather Jackson, Vice President, Executive Editor
- Publication types: Books
- Nonfiction topics: Diet, health, fitness, relationships, self-improvement, memoir and spirituality
- Official website: randomhousebooks.com/harmony

Harmony Books is an imprint of the Crown Publishing Group, itself part of publisher Penguin Random House. Bruce Harris, a Crown executive, founded it in 1972. It publishes nonfiction authors who tend to be leaders of thought, distinguished authorities on their subject, credentialed experts, and those seeking to restructure cultural conversations.

The imprint has been used for such books as:

- Jill Freedman, Circus Days (1975, ISBN 0-517-52008-7, ISBN 0-517-52009-5).
- Mark Lewisohn, The Beatles Recording Sessions (1988, ISBN 978-0-517-57066-1).
- Leni Riefenstahl, Vanishing Africa (1982, ISBN 0-517-54914-X).
- Stephen Jay Gould, Full House: The Spread of Excellence from Plato to Darwin (1996, ISBN 0-517-70394-7).

Harmony Books is currently focused on books about personal transformation, well-being, health, relationships, self-improvement, and spirituality. Readers will also find titles about inspirational living, psychology, science, and memoirs with inspirational messages. Some of the books and authors available include Master Your Metabolism by Jillian Michaels; Change Your Brain, Change Your Body by Daniel G. Amen; The Dukan Diet by Pierre Dukan; Ageless Body, Timeless Mind by Deepak Chopra; The 4-Hour Workweek and The 4-Hour Body by Timothy Ferriss; eighteen books by Suzanne Somers; Queen Bees & Wannabes and Masterminds & Wingmen by Rosalind Wiseman; and A Profound Mind and The Art of Happiness in a Troubled World by the Dalai Lama.

== Some recent books ==
- Outlive: The Science and Art of Longevity, Peter Attia MD and Bill Gifford
- Ageless Body, Timeless Mind, Deepak Chopra
- Suzanne Somers' Eat Great Lose Weight, Suzanne Somers
- The Seven Principles for Making Marriage Work, John Gottman and Nan Silver
- Cesar's Way, Cesar Millan and Melissa Jo Peltier
- Anatomy of Spirit, Carolyn Myss
- Change Your Brain, Change Your Life, Daniel Amen
- Master Your Metabolism, Jillian Michaels
- The 4-Hour Body, Timothy Ferris
- The Fast Metabolism Diet, Haylie Pomroy
