= Tracy Wolff =

American author

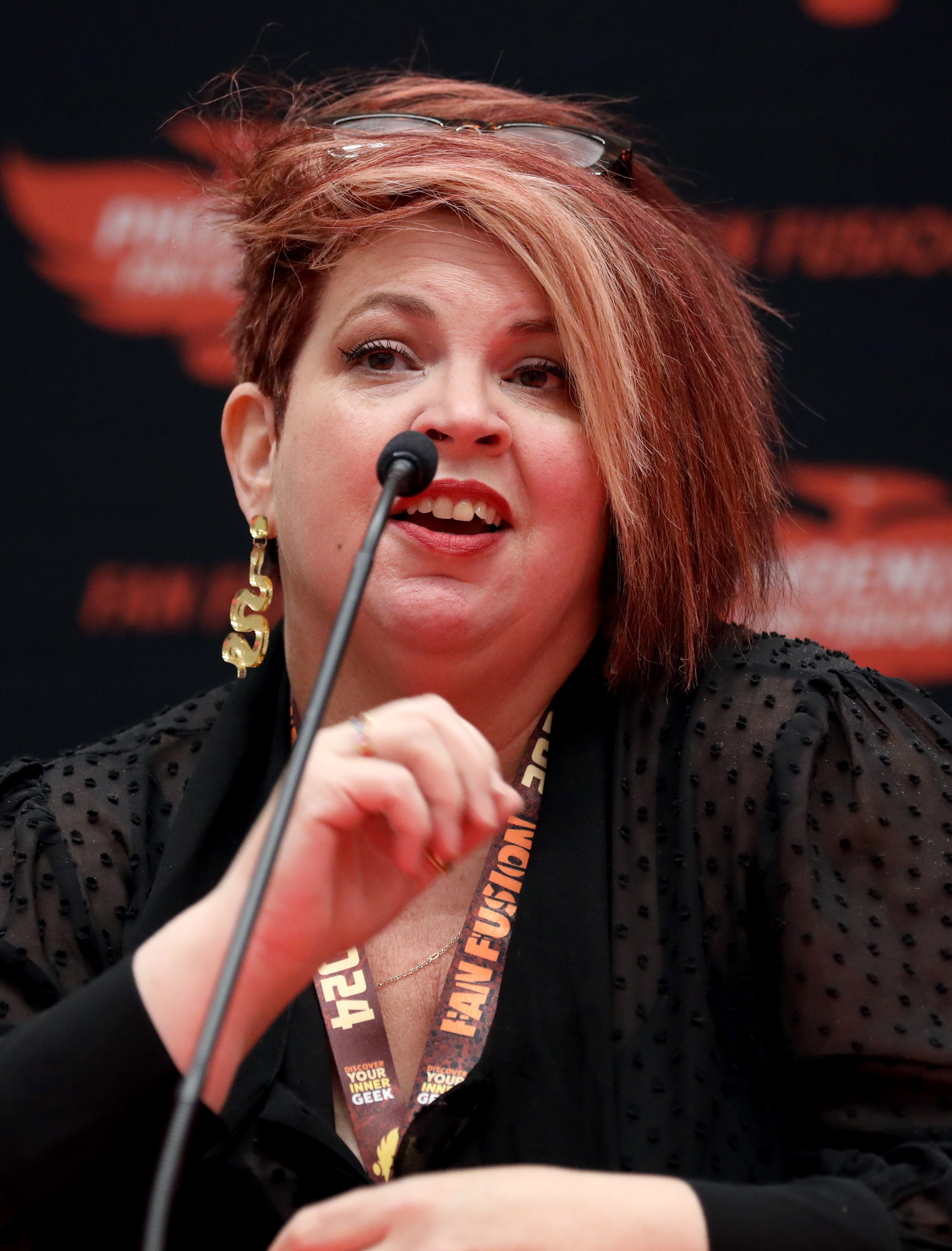
- Wolff at an event in Phoenix, Arizona (2024)
- Born: Tracy Deebs
- Occupation: Author
- Writing career
- Genre: Young adult fiction
- Notable work: Crave series
- Movements: Contemporary fantasy, urban fantasy
- Website: tracywolffauthor.com

Tracy Deebs-Elkenaney, professionally known as Tracy Wolff, is an American author of young adult fiction, best known for her bestselling series Crave. She also writes under the pen name Tessa Adams.

== Personal life ==
Wolff is an only child who lost her father unexpectedly at the age of 22. She is a mother of three and a former English professor, who now works as a full-time writer from her home in Austin, Texas.

== The Crave series ==
The Crave series is a popular romantasy saga that combines elements of paranormal romance with young adult fantasy, reaching the New York Times best-seller list. The series follows Grace, a teenager who moves to a mysterious Alaskan boarding school after the death of her parents. There, she discovers a supernatural world filled with vampires, werewolves, witches, and gargoyles.

The series debuted in April 2020 with Crave and has several sequels. As of 2024, the series had sold over 3.5 million copies globally and gained a massive following, particularly among fans of BookTok.

Shortly before the book's release, Universal Studios acquired the film rights to Crave. The adaptation was billed as a paranormal fantasy with a feminist lens, expanding the book's themes to a cinematic audience.

== Copyright infringement accusations ==
In 2022, Tracy Wolff faced a lawsuit from Lynne Freeman, an unpublished author, alleging that Wolff's Crave series had substantial similarities to Freeman's unpublished manuscript Blue Moon Rising, which Freeman had submitted to the same literary agent, Emily Sylvan Kim, in 2010 Freeman cited overlapping plot elements, character dynamics, and details, including an Alaskan setting, a supernatural romance, and scenes featuring mystical occurrences.

Wolff and her publisher, Entangled Publishing, denied the allegations, emphasizing that the creative elements in Crave were independently developed. The lawsuit raised complex questions about originality and creative overlap in the romantasy genre. In March 2026, a judged ruled against Freeman, stating many of her assertions called on the use of common phrases, which "trivializes copyright law," and that Wolff's and Freeman's works were "vastly different in substance, style, structure, length, tone and mood." The 160-page ruling has been widely circulated on social media and in fan communities.

== Bibliography ==
Wolff published over sixty novels between 2007 and 2018.

=== The Lone Star Witch Series ===
==== Published as Tessa Adams ====
- Soulbound (February 5, 2013)
- Flamebound (December 3, 2013)

=== The Shaken Dirty Series ===
- Crash Into Me (October 14, 2013)
- Drive Me Crazy (February 24, 2014)
- Fade Into You (February 15, 2016)

=== The Ethan Frost Series ===
- Ruined (January 7, 2014)
- Addicted (July 15, 2014)
- Exposed (May 5, 2015)
- Flawed (January 17, 2017)

=== Crave Series ===
- Crave (April 7, 2020)
- Crush (September 29, 2020)
- Covet (March 2, 2021)
- Court (February 1, 2022)
- Charm (November 8, 2022)
- Cherish (May 30, 2023)
- Katmere Academy: an insider's guide (November 23, 2021)

=== The Calder Academy Series ===
- Sweet Nightmare (May 7, 2024)
- Sweet Chaos (expected November 2, 2027)
- Sweet Vengeance (expected 2027)

=== The Aftermyth Series ===
- The Aftermyth (February 3, 2026)

== See also ==
- Jennifer L. Armentrout
- Cassandra Clare
- Melissa Landers
- Sarah J. Maas
