= NYC Surgical Associates =

- Company type: Private
- Headquarters: New York
- Key people: David Greuner (Chief medical officer), Adam Tonis (COO)
- Services: Surgical Center
- Website: nycsurgical.net

NYC Surgical Associates (NYCSA), is one of the largest multi-specialty surgical practices in the United States. Based in New York, the company consists of seven sites founded by David Greuner and Adam Tonis.

== History ==
NYC Surgical Associates was founded by David Greuner and Adam Tonis in 2009. It specializes in the treatment for several diseases such as lipedema, pelvic congestion, uterine fibroids, and lymphedema. The centres that make up the institution include the Pelvic Institute, Hernia Center, Lipedema Center, Vein and Vascular Center, Reconstructive and Cosmetic Surgery Institute.

== Divisions ==
- Interventional and Endovascular surgery
- Hernia surgery
- Reconstructive surgery
