= The Woman in Me (memoir) =

2023 memoir by Britney Spears

- Author: Britney Spears
- Audio read by: Michelle Williams
- Language: English
- Genre: Memoir
- Publisher: Gallery Books
- Publication date: October 24, 2023
- Publication place: United States
- Media type: Print (paperback)
- Pages: 288
- ISBN: 9781668009048
- Website: britneybook.com

The Woman in Me is a memoir by American singer Britney Spears. It was published on October 24, 2023, by Gallery Books, a division of Simon & Schuster. The book was released in 26 languages. Michelle Williams narrates the audiobook.

The Woman in Me received largely positive reviews from critics. Within a week of its release in the United States, the book became a #1 New York Times best-seller, selling 1.1 million copies in all formats. As of July 2026, it has sold over 3 million copies in the US with an estimated 6 million copies globally. A film adaptation directed by Jon M. Chu, written by Elizabeth Meriwether, and produced by Marc Platt is currently in the works at Universal Pictures as of 2024.

== Background and release ==
On February 21, 2022, it was reported that Spears signed a $15 million book deal for her then-upcoming memoir, one of the biggest book deals of all time, three months after a Los Angeles Superior Court Judge formally ended her conservatorship. On July 11, 2023, Spears announced that the book would be titled The Woman in Me, and would be released on October 24, 2023. The title is a reference to a lyric in her song "I'm Not a Girl, Not Yet a Woman" (2001), where she sings "I'm just trying to find the woman in me". It was reportedly ghostwritten together with journalist Sam Lansky.

The book contains 288 pages comprising 49 chapters, and was released in 26 languages. The memoir was released in audiobook format simultaneously with the other editions. Spears confirmed she would not fully narrate the audiobook due to its "heart-wrenching and emotional" content, enlisting actress Michelle Williams to record the main bulk of the audiobook, while Spears would participate by reading its introduction. She promoted the memoir in People by providing insights into its content, accompanied by a cover photoshoot, which she had not done since 2016.

== Synopsis ==
The Woman in Me chronicles Spears's journey to stardom, the publicized challenges she faced, and her endeavors to end the conservatorship that once controlled aspects of her personal and financial life.

Spears writes that her paternal grandmother, Emma Jean Spears, was sent to an asylum by Spears's paternal grandfather. Their three-day-old baby had died, and Emma Jean was overwhelmed by grief. While at the asylum, Emma Jean was put on lithium; later, she shot herself over the child's grave. Spears added that "tragedy runs in my family".

Spears was marketed as innocent, even though she had been a regular smoker since the age of 14 and lost her virginity around the same time. In 2002, her then-boyfriend Justin Timberlake dumped her by text on the set of a music video. When she became pregnant by Timberlake in 2000, she writes that he persuaded her to undergo an abortion. Spears writes that Timberlake continuously cheated on her: "Photographers caught Justin with one of the girls from All Saints in a car." After the break-up, her public image suffered, she started to burn out, and began abusing the prescription drug Adderall. She also admitted that she cheated on Timberlake with dancer Wade Robson.

She describes her two-week sexual fling with actor Colin Farrell. The reason for her 55-hour marriage to Jason Alexander was that she was "drunk and very bored". Her family got angry after finding out about her marriage. Spears writes: "They made way too big a deal out of innocent fun. Everybody has a different perspective on it, but I didn't take it that seriously. I thought a goof-around Vegas wedding was something people might do as a joke. Then my family came and acted like I'd started World War III. I cried the whole rest of the time I was in Las Vegas." Spears dives into the rocky relationship with her sister Jamie Lynn and apologizes to Jamie Lynn's Zoey 101 co-star Alexa Nikolas (referring to Nikolas as "that young actress") for yelling at her, adding that she was pregnant and emotional at the time.

Spears discusses her relationship with Kevin Federline and the struggles she faced after becoming a mother, including suffering from postpartum depression. The memoir also goes into further detail and provides a new perspective on widely publicized events in Spears' life, including shaving her head and attacking a paparazzo with an umbrella.

== Reception ==
=== Critical ===
The book received acclaim from The New York Times, Time, and The Los Angeles Times. In a BBC review, Mark Savage called the book "an angry, cautionary tale," while The Independent called it "raw, unfiltered and breathtaking in its rage." Writing for Forbes, Toni Fitzgerald stated that the memoir "changes the conversation on mental health" and child stardom.

=== Commercial ===
Before its release, The Woman in Me debuted atop the Amazon's best-selling "new release" books. Following its publication, it appeared on weekly book sales charts in multiple countries. In the United States, it sold 1.1 million copies in its first week. The sales figures include pre-orders, print sales, e-books, and audiobooks. The memoir became a number-one New York Times best-seller in its first week of release. The book also debuted at number one on the Publishers Weekly Bestseller List selling 417,947 units in its first week. On January 8, 2024, Publishers Weekly included the book in their top ten best-sellers list of 2023 with 908,000 printed copies sold in the US. As of January 11, 2024, The Woman in Me has sold over two million copies in the US.

As of December 2025,The Woman in Me had sold over three million copies in the United States.

By 2026, it was reported that The Woman in Me had sold over six million copies worldwide.

Following the paperback release, the version debuted at #14 on the Paperback Nonfiction list of the New York Times bestseller list, later peaking at #9.

In the United Kingdom, The Woman in Me sold 90,656 print copies in its first week, securing the top spot on the Official UK Top 50 chart. This achievement marks it as Simon & Schuster's quickest-selling title. It became the second best-selling memoir of 2023, only behind Spare by Prince Harry. The audio version also debuted at number one and sales through all print and digital versions combined reached 170,000 units. In Germany, the translated version of the book debuted at number one in the non-fiction category, whereas the English version started at number five on the same chart. Overall, it achieved sales of 120,000 copies. In France, the book debuted at the number one spots in the top large-format literature and top essay charts and reached sales of 15,000 copies. Worldwide, as of November 1, 2023, it sold an estimated amount of 2.4 million copies in print sales. Three months after its release, the memoir was deemed the "#1 listened to title on Spotify".

==== Impact ====
The release of The Woman in Me was credited as a factor to help drive UK book market growth. The book was highlighted as one of the releases to boost sales ahead of Christmas.

The book release generated significant increases in streaming and sales for Spears. In the four days leading up to the release, her catalog experienced a 21% surge in official on-demand U.S. streams, totaling 8.89 million compared to its previous October 13–16 tracking period, which had 7.34 million streams. Additionally, digital sales in the U.S. for Spears more than doubled during these four-day periods, rising from under 1,000 sales from October 13–16 to 2,300 a week later.

=== Public responses ===
In the book, Spears stated that Timberlake had acted inappropriately and put on a blaccent when meeting the singer Ginuwine. However, in December 2023, Ginuwine stated, "I can tell you I don't remember that happening. I truly don't remember that happening [...] If Justin would've did something like that, I probably would've looked at him like, 'Why are you acting like that?' If he did that, that would be something that I would remember. That would've definitely stuck out."

=== Possible sequel ===
In October 2023, Spears teased on her Instagram that she is already writing a follow-up book. Spears initially stated that the book would be released in 2026; however, as of July 2026, it has yet to be released.

== Awards and nominations ==
Year	Award	Category	Nominee	Result
2023	Goodreads Choice Awards	Best Memoir & Autobiography		Won
2024	Audie Awards	Best Non-Fiction Narrator	Michelle Williams	Nominated
2024	British Book Awards	Book of the Year – Non-Fiction: Narrative		Nominated
2024	World of Wonder	Best Book (The Reading is Fundamental Award)		Nominated

== Release history ==
Release history and formats for The Woman in Me
Country	Release date	Edition	Publisher	Ref.
Various	October 24, 2023	Hardback; e-book	Simon & Schuster	
Various	October 24, 2023	Audiobook	Simon & Schuster Audio	
Various	October 24, 2023	CD	Simon & Schuster Audio	
United States	December 2, 2025	Paperback	Simon & Schuster	

== Publication history ==
- Gallery Books (2023): ISBN 9781668009048

== See also ==
- The New York Times Nonfiction Best Sellers of 2023
