= Peter Attia =

Canadian-American author and licensed physician (born 1973)

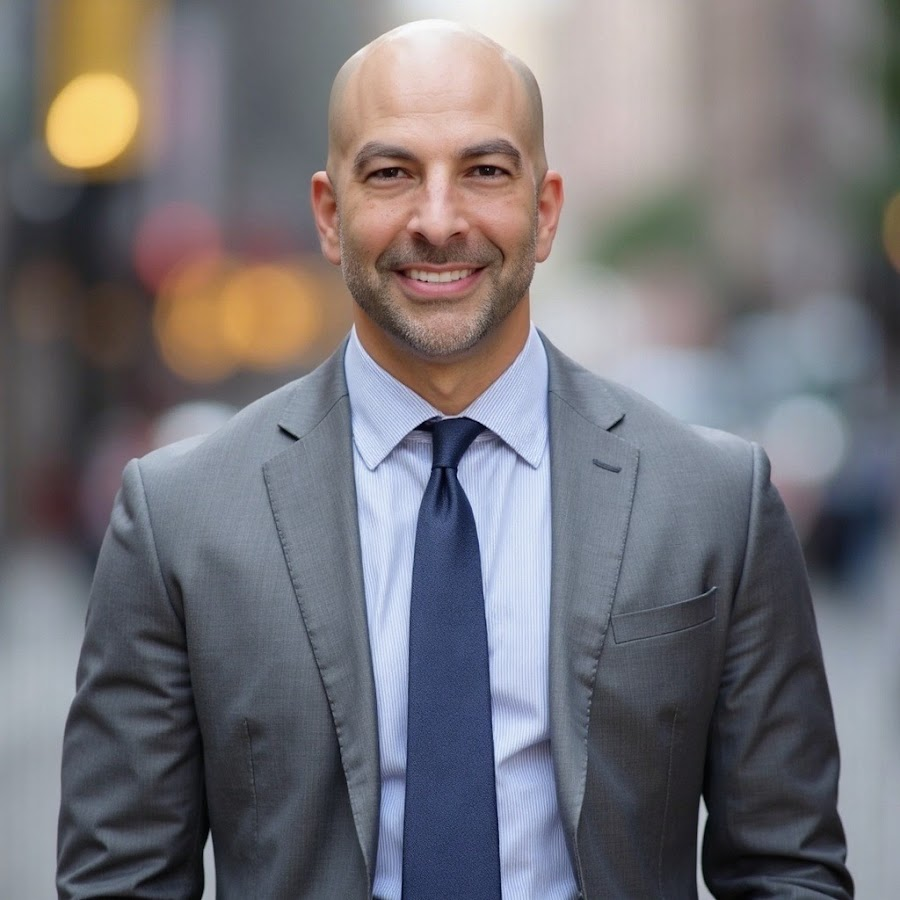
- Attia in 2025
- Born: March 19, 1973 (age 53); Toronto, Ontario, Canada
- Education: Queen's University (BS); Stanford University (MD)
- Occupations: Author; Podcaster; Licensed physician
- Spouse: Jill Attia
- Children: 3
- Website: peterattiamd.com

Peter Attia (born March 19, 1973) is a Canadian-American author, licensed physician and former researcher known for his work in longevity medicine. He is the author of Outlive: The Science and Art of Longevity.

== Early life and education ==
Attia was born and raised in Toronto, Ontario, Canada. He is the child of Egyptian Christian immigrant parents. Several of his paternal uncles died of heart disease: his uncle Francis died of a sudden heart attack at 46, when Attia was five, another uncle at 42 and a third at 69. His father, who worked at a limestone quarry, had a heart attack in his mid-sixties and later received a coronary stent. Attia has written that this family history drove his interest in cardiovascular prevention and that Outlive "probably wouldn't have been written" without it. As a ten-year-old he hoped to become a professional ice hockey player. As a teenager he took up boxing, which, as he later recounted in Outlive, gave him an outlet for the anger left by a difficult childhood, and he went on to compete at an elite junior level. He began boxing and martial arts at 13, and from about 14 trained with weights alongside his best friend in a basement gym on the Scarborough campus of the University of Toronto, both of them aspiring prizefighters. Around the age of 19 he turned from boxing to mathematics, crediting the sport with the discipline and focus he brought to his studies.

He studied at Queen's University at Kingston, graduating in 1996 with a Bachelor of Science in mechanical engineering and applied mathematics. He initially intended to pursue a doctorate in aerospace engineering, and by his senior year had applied to leading PhD programmes in the field. During a post-baccalaureate year completing medical school prerequisites, he volunteered on the pediatric cancer ward of Kingston General Hospital, an experience he said confirmed his move from engineering to medicine. He then entered Stanford University School of Medicine, from which he received his Doctor of Medicine in 2001. Attia has described how, determined to be ready for the operating room, he spent every Thursday night as a medical student practising suturing at his desk. After reading Steven Rosenberg's The Transformed Cell, he decided to become a surgical oncologist, and in his third year he spent four months in Rosenberg's laboratory at the National Cancer Institute. During medical school a weightlifting back injury required two surgeries and left him largely bedridden for months.

== Career ==
=== Surgical training and cancer research ===
From 2001 to 2006, Attia began a residency in general surgery at the Johns Hopkins Hospital in Baltimore, Maryland. He left his general surgery residency at Johns Hopkins in 2006 and spent two years as a research fellow at the National Cancer Institute of the National Institutes of Health, studying immunotherapy for melanoma.

=== Consulting ===
After dropping out of his residency program, Attia joined the consulting firm McKinsey & Company in the Palo Alto office as a member of the Corporate Risk Practice and Healthcare Practice. He and his wife moved to the San Francisco Bay Area in 2006, and he has said he felt at the time that he had "wasted a decade" of his life. Hired into the healthcare practice, he was moved to credit risk because of his quantitative background, helping large U.S. banks comply with new rules requiring reserves against unexpected losses. By late summer 2007 his team had concluded that the banks would lose more money on prime mortgages over the following two years than they had made in the previous decade, and in late 2007 he presented the findings to the management of a major U.S. bank.

=== Turn to longevity medicine ===
After the birth of his daughter, medical tests showed that Attia, although still in his thirties and exercising heavily, already had risk factors for cardiovascular disease. The finding prompted him to change his own diet and to make the prevention of chronic disease the focus of his work.

Attia has written that in September 2009, after a 14-hour swim from Los Angeles to Santa Catalina Island, his wife told him he should "work on being a little less not thin". At 36 he weighed 210 pounds (95 kg), about 50 pounds (23 kg) more than his boxing weight; blood tests showed he had become insulin resistant, and his testosterone was below the 5th percentile for his age.

He stopped consuming added sugar and later followed a ketogenic diet for three years, which he has said reversed his incipient metabolic syndrome; he also practised periodic extended water-only fasts. He sought out researchers as informal mentors, moving from nutrition and metabolism to atherosclerosis, cancer, neurodegenerative disease and the biology of aging; his mentors on cardiovascular disease included Tom Dayspring, Allan Sniderman and Ron Krauss. Follow-up CT angiograms in 2016 and 2022 showed no new plaque.

His views have since changed. He no longer follows a ketogenic diet, noting that versions high in saturated fat raise apoB in many people, and he stopped recommending prolonged fasting because of the associated muscle loss. He now regards exercise, rather than nutrition, as "the most potent longevity 'drug'". In 2016 he travelled to Easter Island, where rapamycin was discovered, with biologists David Sabatini and Navdeep Chandel and author Tim Ferriss, partly to scout a site for a research conference on the drug. In December 2018 he met exercise physiologist Iñigo San Millán, director of performance for the UAE Team Emirates cycling team, whose work on zone 2 training became central to Attia's own regimen.

Attia also created the blog "The Eating Academy" (later "War on Insulin" and now peterattiamd.com) that mostly focuses on topics related to nutrition, physical activity, and longevity. Subsequently, he launched the podcast The Peter Attia Drive, in which he interviews experts each week, covering topics such as longevity, metabolic health, and medical research.

=== Nutrition Science Initiative ===
In 2012, Attia co-founded the Nutrition Science Initiative (NuSI) with Gary Taubes, with a primary focus on promoting nutrition research and tackling the growing health challenges linked to obesity, diabetes, and metabolic diseases. In 2013, Attia was a speaker at TEDMED, where he shared insights on longevity.

The organisation secured a $4.7 million seed grant from the Laura and John Arnold Foundation in 2012 and a further $35.5 million commitment in 2013, raising more than $40 million in total to test whether "all calories are created equal". By 2013 NuSI was coordinating three major research projects across six academic institutions. Attia stepped down at the end of 2015 to return to research.

=== Longevity medicine ===
In 2014, Attia returned to medical practice and founded a private clinic dedicated to longevity medicine, a practice built on what he calls "Medicine 3.0": a proactive, personalised approach that aims to extend both lifespan and healthspan rather than waiting to treat disease once it appears.

Attia contributed a chapter of advice to Tim Ferriss's 2016 book Tools of Titans. In 2017, he posted on his YouTube Channel, with his first set of videos being instructional exercise videos. It now has more than a million subscribers and focuses on longevity content. Subsequently, in 2018, he launched the podcast The Peter Attia Drive.

In 2022 Attia served as the longevity physician on Limitless with Chris Hemsworth, a six-part documentary for National Geographic and Disney+ starring Chris Hemsworth and directed by Darren Aronofsky. In episode 5, Attia told Hemsworth that he carried the high-risk APOE4 allele, which places him at elevated risk of neurodegenerative aging of the Alzheimer's type.

On March 28, 2023, Attia (with coauthor Bill Gifford) published his book Outlive: The Science & Art of Longevity. According to The New York Times Magazine, the book "has been a runaway best seller since it was published this spring [of 2023]"; it was No. 3 on the Amazon Charts for nonfiction as of August 24, 2023. Attia was named in Time's 2024 list of influential people in health. By October 2025, CBS News reported that Outlive had sold nearly three million copies and that The Peter Attia Drive had been downloaded more than 100 million times. The Guardian called the book an "exhaustive, lucid exploration" of Attia's ideas while noting that the lifestyle changes it proposes could appear onerous and complicated. GQ described it as exhaustive and clear, while observing that it raised more questions than it answered.

In October 2025, Attia appeared on CBS's 60 Minutes, where he discussed the role of structured exercise and preventative health strategies in extending health span.

== Personal life ==
Attia currently lives in the Austin, Texas, area with his wife and three children.

=== Athletics ===
In 2005, Attia swam across the channel between Santa Catalina Island and Los Angeles, the 120th person to achieve that feat. Setting off from Doctor's Cove, near the island's northwest end, shortly after midnight on 11 October, he swam the 20.2 miles (32.5 km) crossing to a beach below the Point Vicente lighthouse on the Palos Verdes Peninsula in about ten and a half hours, faster than the twelve he had planned. Around 3 a.m. the wind rose to gusts of up to 20 miles per hour (32 km/h), with swells of about 4 feet (1.2 m) that left him nauseated from swallowed seawater.

He trained for the crossing by swimming roughly 20 to 30 miles per week alongside a surgical residency that at times reached 100 hours per week, and drew on his undergraduate training in mechanical engineering to analyse the physics of his stroke. He had swum his first pool lap only about five years earlier and completed his first open-water swim in the summer of 2004; under coach John Flanagan he trained three to four hours a day in the pool, with weekend swims of up to eight hours in Lake Barcroft in northern Virginia. He said at the time that the swim was intended in part to draw attention to the Terry Fox Foundation's cancer-research work. Terry Fox, who ran a marathon a day for 143 days after losing a leg to bone cancer, had been Attia's hero since grade school. Attia was back on call at Johns Hopkins less than a day after finishing. On 8 September 2009 he crossed the channel in the opposite direction, from the mainland to the island; against the current, the swim took about 14 hours. He completed one of the crossings with a torn labrum that required surgery more than 15 years later. Attia has also boxed, cycled competitively and competes in archery.

He took up competitive cycling with the goal of winning a local 20-kilometre individual time-trial series, analysing power-meter data and modelling his aerodynamic drag, but quit after concluding that he had become "a one-dimensional athlete" with high aerobic capacity but limited strength, flexibility and stability. His current training includes about an hour of zone 2 stationary cycling four times a week, heavy weightlifting four times a week, rucking with a weighted pack, and stability training with trainer Beth Lewis. His own "Centenarian Decathlon" includes swimming half a mile in 20 minutes and drawing a 50-pound (23 kg) compound bow. He has called auto racing his favourite sport and has trained with a coach at a Southern California racetrack, and has written that he is drawn to racing and archery because both "demand perfection".

=== Mental health ===
In the final chapter of Outlive, Attia wrote that by 2017 he was as physically healthy as he had ever been but emotionally "on a horrible path", describing years of uncontrolled anger, detachment and workaholism. He wrote that in retrospect he had been severely depressed as a teenager and in college without recognising it. He disclosed that he had been physically and sexually abused as a child, beginning at age five, by someone outside his family, and that he did not tell anyone the full story, including his wife, until 2017.

At the urging of his wife and of Paul Conti, Attia spent two weeks in December 2017 at The Bridge to Recovery, a residential treatment programme in Bowling Green, Kentucky; he later wrote that leaving after two weeks, against his therapists' advice, "was probably a mistake". He continued in therapy, including with Esther Perel and Terrence Real. In April 2020, during the COVID-19 pandemic, he had what he described as a self-destructive episode unlike any before or since, and spent three weeks in inpatient treatment in Phoenix, Arizona. He has written that he has since practised dialectical behavior therapy and keeps a weekly therapy session, and that while medication and guided use of MDMA and psilocybin helped at points in his recovery, none substitutes for long-term psychotherapy.

Attia has said the experience changed his view of longevity: he came to regard emotional health as possibly "the most important component of healthspan", and wrote that his earlier pursuit of longevity had been driven by a fear of dying.

== Oura litigation ==
In 2012, Attia co-founded the Nutrition Science Initiative (NuSI) with science journalist Gary Taubes to fund research into the carbohydrate–insulin model of obesity. The organization received a funding commitment of about $40 million from the Laura and John Arnold Foundation. Attia stepped down as president in 2015. NuSI later lost its research partners following disagreements over study design and the interpretation of pilot results, lost its principal funding, and largely ceased operations by 2018.

Attia was introduced to Jeffrey Epstein in 2015 through Eva Andersson-Dubin. Epstein's appointment calendars, released in 2025, recorded several meetings involving Attia. Emails released in connection with the Epstein files documented communications between Attia and Epstein concerning patient referrals, accommodation, a hiring decision at Attia's clinic, and health and longevity. According to Bloomberg, the last meeting between the two documented in the emails took place on September 28, 2018, while Attia was in New York for a cancer meeting he had invited Epstein to attend.

On February 3, 2026, David founder Peter Rahal announced that Attia had stepped down as the company's chief science officer, and Attia's name and image were removed from the company's website. Biograph, the testing startup Attia co-founded, declined to comment on his status. Attia also publicly apologized for the content of some of his emails with Epstein.

Attia began working with Oura in 2017 as an adviser and promoter of its smart ring, and invested in the company in 2018. In February 2019, he entered into a stock option agreement signed by then-CEO Harpreet Rai. According to Attia's court filings, it gave him the right to acquire 20,000 shares at €1.76 per share in exchange for advisory and promotional services. After Rai's departure in December 2021, Attia sought to exercise the options in January 2022. Oura declined to honor the agreement, and Attia filed a breach-of-contract suit in the Northern District of California in 2023.

Oura has argued that its board never authorized the grant and that the agreement is invalid, citing the Finnish Companies Act, under which option rights are issued by the shareholders' general meeting or an authorized board rather than the CEO. The company sought to move the dispute to arbitration in Helsinki under the shareholders' agreement Attia had accepted as an investor. The district court denied the motion in 2024, finding that Attia's investment and advisory agreements were separate. The Ninth Circuit affirmed on 21 March 2025, and the case has since proceeded in federal court in Oakland.

Attia's suit is one of three similar claims over options allegedly promised by Rai. The others were brought by former NFL quarterback Drew Brees, whose case was sent to arbitration in 2025, and early investor Gurinder "Gordy" Bal.
