= Dark romance =

Literary subgenre

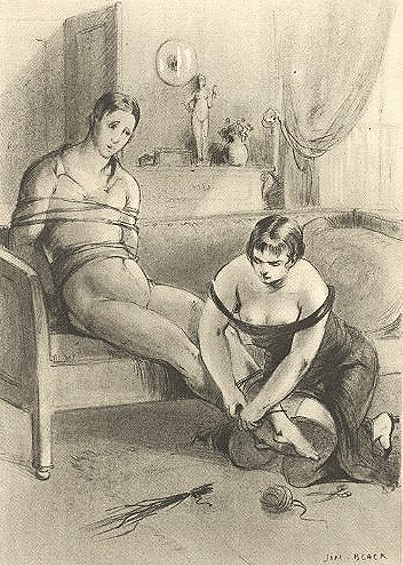
Artwork depicting a female dominant performing bondage on her male submissive

Dark romance is a subgenre of romance fiction characterized by the depiction of intimate relationships involving morally ambiguous dynamics, power imbalances, and transgressive or taboo elements. Unlike traditional romance, the genre centers relationships in which behaviors such as control, coercion, or violence may be integrated into the romantic dynamic itself.

It commonly features explicit sexual content, often intertwined with themes of dominance, submission, and consent.

== Characteristics ==
Dark romance is characterized by the depiction of protagonists who deviate from conventional romantic ideals, often including morally complex, socially transgressive, or antagonistic figures such as criminals, antiheroes, or psychologically unstable individuals. These characterizations frame relationships in which emotional intensity and ethical ambiguity are central to both characterization and narrative development.

A defining feature of the genre is the portrayal of romantic relationships structured around imbalance, whether in terms of power, autonomy, or emotional dependency. Such dynamics frequently involve control, obsession, or volatility, and are presented as integral to the relationship rather than as external sources of conflict. As a result, the progression of the narrative is driven primarily by the internal tensions between the characters.

In many cases these dynamics extend into the sexual dimension of the relationship, where intimacy reflects or reinforces existing asymmetries.

== Themes and tropes ==
Dark romance frequently employs narrative tropes that foreground conflict, inequality of power, and psychological tension within romantic relationships. These may include adversarial dynamics such as enemies-to-lovers, as well as scenarios involving confinement, coercion, or restricted autonomy, which shape the progression of the relationship.

Recurring themes in the genre include obsession, dependency, and the negotiation of power within intimate relationships. Such themes are frequently developed through heightened emotional or psychological stakes, with narrative tension arising from the imbalance between characters rather than from external plot structures.

Some works in the genre depict dynamics of dominance and submission, as well as scenarios involving either explicitly non-consensual interactions or situations where consent is narratively ambiguous. In these cases, such elements are typically presented as part of the relationship's internal dynamics.

== Genre definition and differentiation ==
Dark romance is a contemporary subgenre of romantic fiction that has emerged as a distinct category within popular publishing, particularly through digital platforms and online reading communities. It is distinguished from other genres by the narrative function of its darker elements. In genres such as horror or thriller fiction, themes like violence, fear, or psychological tension are primarily used to evoke suspense, dread, or unease, instead of developing romantic attachment.

By contrast dark romance incorporates similar themes within a romantic framework, where they directly shape the emotional intensity and progression of the central relationship. As a result, the genre is defined by how these elements are integrated into narratives of intimacy, desire, and emotional attachment.

== Relationship to earlier literary traditions ==
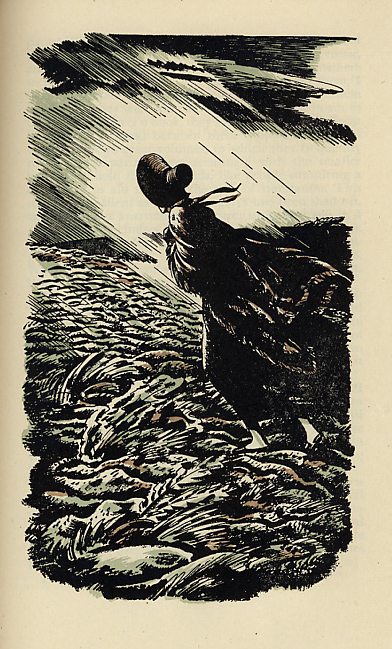
Jane Eyre's trial through the moors in Charlotte Brontë's Jane Eyre (1847)

Although dark romance shares certain thematic and aesthetic features with earlier literary traditions, it differs significantly in its treatment of romantic relationships.

Dark Romanticism, a subgenre of nineteenth century Romanticism, explores the darker aspects of the human psyche, including guilt, obsession, and moral ambiguity, as seen in authors such as Edgar Allan Poe and Nathaniel Hawthorne. However, these works do not typically construct romantic relationships around the sustained integration of harmful interpersonal dynamics.

Similarly, Gothic literature employs settings and narrative strategies designed to evoke suspense, decay, and the supernatural. While Gothic fiction often incorporates romance, these elements are generally embedded within a broader atmosphere of fear and mystery rather than constituting the core dynamic of the relationship itself.

Dark romance represents a more recent development in which the boundary between intimacy and taboo or destructive dynamics is deliberately blurred, integrating elements of danger directly into the progression of the romantic relationship.

== Misclassification and genre ambiguity ==
The term "dark romance" lacks a universally agreed definition and is applied inconsistently across publishing, marketing, and reader communities. Scholars and commentators have noted that this inconsistency blurs the boundaries between dark romance and adjacent genres, particularly when dark elements such as violence or explicit content are used as external plot devices rather than as integral components of the central romantic relationship. As a result, works with differing narrative priorities are often grouped under the same label, contributing to ambiguity in genre classification.

This can also affect reader expectations, especially when marketing labels do not accurately reflect the role that power dynamics, consent, or emotional intensity play within the narrative.

== Development and popularity ==
Dark romance developed into a commercially recognizable subgenre during the 2010s, alongside the expansion of self-publishing and digital reading platforms. Its growth has been shaped largely by reader communities, whose use of informal labeling, tagging practices, and online discussion spaces contributed to the consolidation of the genre as a distinct category.

The genre's popularity has been further driven by social media circulation, particularly through recommendation systems and user-generated content that amplify specific titles, authors, and tropes. This visibility has supported its transition from niche readerships into broader commercial markets, with increasing integration into mainstream publishing.

== Reception and criticism ==
Dark romance has been the subject of ongoing critical debate, particularly regarding the interpretation and implications of its narrative framing. Some critics argue that the genre's depiction of intense or ethically ambiguous relationships risks normalizing or aestheticizing harmful dynamics, especially in relation to consent and agency.

Supporters, however, contend that dark romance provides a fictional space for the exploration of taboo themes and complex emotional experiences, including those related to trauma, emphasizing the distinction between fictional narratives and real-world behavior.
