= Iron Flame =

2023 fantasy novel by Rebecca Yarros

- Author: Rebecca Yarros
- Language: English
- Series: The Empyrean
- Release number: 2
- Genre: New adult fiction; Fantasy romance
- Published: November 7, 2023
- Publisher: Red Tower Books (Entangled Publishing)
- Pages: 623
- ISBN: 978-1-64937-417-2
- Preceded by: Fourth Wing
- Followed by: Onyx Storm

Iron Flame is a 2023 new adult romantic fantasy novel by American author Rebecca Yarros. It is the second in the Empyrean series, a planned five-book series.

== Background ==
The second installment in the Empyrean series was released on November 7, 2023. Yarros took to Instagram to announce the title and release date of the second installment of the Empyrean series two days after Fourth Wing’s release. Three months before Iron Flame hit shelves, TODAY.com posted an exclusive 500-word teaser excerpt.

The storyline continues where the first book ended. Violet has to use the abilities she learned during Threshing at Basgiath War College and achieve her true power, even though the vice commandant is determined to show her how weak she is.

== Plot ==
Violet Sorrengail discovers that her brother Brennan is alive and a lieutenant colonel in a secret rebellion against a hidden threat in Navarre. (Note: This story is set immediately after the events of Fourth Wing.) The revolutionary group eventually allows her and other cadets who survived an attack to return to their college, provided they keep the attack a secret. They lie about being attacked by gryphons. Colonel Aetos, who led them into the trap during the War Games, is demoted by Lilith Sorrengail and reassigned to another outpost. Violet ends her friendship with Dain, blaming him for Liam's death since he used his retrocognition signet on her without her knowledge or consent. Before leaving, Aetos makes a veiled death threat to Violet, noting that secrets die with the people who keep them.

Xaden, now a lieutenant, is stationed at the Samara outpost. He and Violet can see each other weekly because of their dragons' bond. Xaden refuses to share the truth with Violet and is unwilling to include her in a weapons smuggling operation with other rebels. On conscription day, Violet and Dain see Prince Cam, who is using the name Aaric Graycastle. Violet also meets Sloane, who blames her for her brother Liam's death. Violet survives an assassination attempt by Aetos, while many survivors start to die mysteriously. Andarna, Violet's dragon, enters a necessary phase of growth called "dreamless sleep."

Violet learns about an unactivated ward stone in Aretia and secretly investigates the First Six, who created the wards in Navarre. She gets help from Jesinia, a scribe who illegally smuggles books for her. Xaden confronts Violet about her secret research, while she struggles to keep the truth from Rhiannon and her sister, Mira. Violet discovers Aaric is in Basgiath looking for a solution to the venin threat. Meanwhile, vice commandant Major Burton Varrish grows suspicious of her and regularly searches her bags. During an interrogation exercise on Violet's squad, he orders Dain to read Violet's memories, but he refuses. Violet later sees Jack Barlowe, whom she thought she killed before, back in Basgiath, seemingly healed.

On a trip to Samara, Xaden and Violet deepen their physical relationship. Xaden trusts Violet enough to bring her along to meet a group of gryphon fliers, where he smuggles daggers to help them fight venin. The group includes Xaden's ex-girlfriend, Cat. He gives Violet a special dagger for defense, which she hides. However, upon returning to Basgiath, Violet is captured by Varrish. Rhiannon uses her powers to hide the dagger, but Violet has to reveal the truth about venin to her friends, Ridoc and Sawyer, who agree to help her investigate the First Six. Violet believes that journals written by Lyra and Warrick of the First Six are hidden in a vault that only member of the royal bloodline can access and contain instructions on how to raise wards. She convinces Aaric to join their mission to steal the journals. They succeed and Violet gives Xaden Warrick's journal to take to Brennan. However, Violet is betrayed by Nolon (an elderly mender and longtime friend of Violet's) and tricked into drinking a serum that suppresses her signet and connection to Tairn before being captured by Varrish.

Varrish tortures Violet for days for information before once again ordering Dain to read her memory, claiming she is conspiring to bring down the wards. Dain does so, but Violet makes him view the memories of the Venin attack in Athebyne. Realizing he has been lied to, Dain turns on Varrish and stabs him. Xaden arrives and they kill Varrish. To expose the truth about the Venin, Xaden had Wyvern carcasses dropped at several outposts, prompting Navarre leadership to frantically try and cover it up. They are intercepted by Lilith, who helps Violet and reveals she forced Violet to join the riders quadrant to keep her away from the leader of the Scribes, Lewis Markham, knowing he would groom her to be his successor, but have her killed when she tried to expose the truth about the venin. With the truth exposed, many of Basgiath's riders choose to leave for Aretia to fight against the venin.

Violet translates part of Warrick's journal, but cannot activate the wardstone. She discovers that Viscount Tecarus, an old ally of Fen Riorson, possesses a luminary that could help the rebels make weapons. Violet travels to Krovla to seek an alliance with him. She finds out that Cat is Tecarus's niece and was once engaged to Xaden, who ended it a year before. Tecarus agrees to give them the luminary if the rebels take 100 gryphon fliers back to Aretia for training. Andarna wakes up after a long sleep, but Violet feels guilt over Andarna's sacrifice during the fight in Resson, knowing it harmed her ability to bear a rider.

Violet asks Dain for help translating the journals, and they become closer again after he assures her he did not know about the venin or intend to harm her. During a training exercise, Violet, Cat, and Sloane face an attack from Varrish's dragon, which seeks revenge for Varrish's death. Andarna saves them by killing the dragon, and Sloane manifests a siphon signet. Violet discovers that Xaden has a second signet as a result of Sgaeyl being originally bonded to his grandfather. He is an inntinnsic, allowing him to sense people's intentions, but keeps it a secret due to it being an illegal signet. Though upset about his secret, they reconcile when he promises to be honest. She also realizes she misinterpreted a phrase in the journals and realizes the wardstone will activate when imbued with magic and exposed to fire from a dragon of each of the six dens. She manages to raise the Aretia wards, though only temporarily as they are still missing a key element to truly activate them. Violet, Mira and Xaden are summoned to a meeting by Lilith and Melgren, who reveals he has foreseen a venin attack in Samara that they will lose if they do not help them. Brennan reveals himself to Lilith and rejects their plea, berating them for their refusal to help anyone outside the safety of Navarre's wards. Before leaving, Lilith reveals Warrick had lied in his journal about how to truly activate the wards as he only wanted Navarre to have them and gives Violet Lyra's journal which contains the true instructions.

Realizing the attack on Samara is a distraction and the venin plan to attack Basgiath, Violet and the others return to the college to warn Lilith. Jack reveals he is a venin, and sacrifices his dragon to destroy Basgiath's wardstone, bringing down the wards and allowing the venin to attack the college. The venin siege the college and riders and fliers unite to fight them off. Jesinia translates Lyra's journal which reveals that seven dragon dens are needed to activate the wardstone. Violet discovers Andarna is from an unknown seventh den needed to activate the wards. Brennan is able to mend the wardstone and Violet almost exhausts herself trying to imbue it with enough magic to reactivate it, but Lilith stops and has Sloane siphon all the magic from herself and her dragon to fully imbue the wardstone, sacrificing Lilith in the process. The wardstone is reactivated when Andarna and a dragon from the six other dens breathe fire on it, killing the wyvern and defeating the venin. After the battle, Xaden reveals he resorted to drawing magic directly from the ground to defeat the venin sage and protect Violet, becoming a venin himself in the process.

== Characters ==
- Violet Sorrengail: The protagonist and narrator. Second year in the Riders Quadrant at Basgiath War College who is bonded to two dragons, Tairn and Andarna, defying expectations that she would not survive due to her size and physical strength. After being betrayed by those she trusted, Violet needs to decide between aiding the rebellion or hiding behind a lie. She also needs to survive another year in the Rider’s Quadrant and all the life-threatening tests it throws at her.
- Xaden Riorson: Now a lieutenant, he must balance leading a secret rebellion, surviving the venin attacks, and his rocky relationship with Violet. He is bonded to Sgaeyl, who is mated to Violet’s dragon, Tairn.
- Dain Aetos: On the outs after using his signet of retrocognition on Violet, Dain has to earn back her trust or risk the success of Fourth Wing, of which he is now Wingleader.
- Rhiannon Matthias:Violet’s best friend. She knows Violet is keeping secrets from her.
- Mira Sorrengail: Lieutenant dragon rider in the Eastern Wing and older sister to Violet. She is assigned to the same fort as Xaden. Bonded to Teine.
- Brennan Sorrengail: Violet’s older brother, who was previously known to have died in battle. He is now leading the revolution. Bonded to Marbh. His signet is mending.
- Burton Varrish: The new vice commandant at Basgaith War College who takes particular interest in Violet. He is known for his history with brutal interrogation methods due to his signet: reading a person’s weaknesses.
- Imogen Cardulo: A third-year rider at Basgiath War College and Xaden's close friend.
- Garrick Tavis: An experienced dragon rider and Xaden's childhood friend.
- Aaric Graycastle, also known as Cam Tauri, His real name being Camlaen Aaric Tauri: The third son of King Tauri and a first-year rider at Basgiath War College.

== Development ==
The writing schedule Yarros follows makes it so that she can write 2–3 books a year. The process for Iron Flame was expedited due to consumer momentum from the success of Fourth Wing and the excitement from Entangled Publishing, making it so that Iron Flame could be released only seven months after its predecessor.

Yarros’ parents were lieutenant colonels, and her husband was in the United States Army, both of which inspired the death culture of the Empyrean series: “I can tell you: when you go to war, your friends don’t always come home. And so, it was important to me to... keep that realism [in the Empyrean series].” Her husband also aided in developing “aerial combat” scenes with his experience as an Apache pilot.

== Genre ==
Iron Flame is considered romantasy: “fantasy with...a romance vein.” Yarros is considered a notable writer of the genre due to her work on Fourth Wing and Iron Flame. Romantasy is largely written by women and marketed for women, but Iron Flame has proven to appeal to a male audience because of its inclusion of dragons and dragon culture reminiscent of George R.R. Martin’s A Song of Ice and Fire, which continues to draw a heavily male audience.

== Reception ==
The book received widespread acclaim upon its release day, selling over half a million copies. Iron Flame generated significant buzz online and offline with 200 Barnes & Noble stores throughout the USA organizing midnight release parties for the book, including a notable event in New York City attended by Yarros. In addition to these official gatherings, independent bookstores hosted their own celebrations, quickly running out of tickets due to the high demand.

After the release, many readers pointed out that their copies of Iron Flame had a variety of misprints. These included spines that read Fourth Wing instead of Iron Flame and covers that had the title and author's name printed upside down. Other readers said there were pages inside of the book printed the wrong way, or out of order. Entangled Publishing agreed to exchange the misprinted books.

In November 2023, Iron Flame was ranked #1 national fiction bestseller by Publishers Weekly.

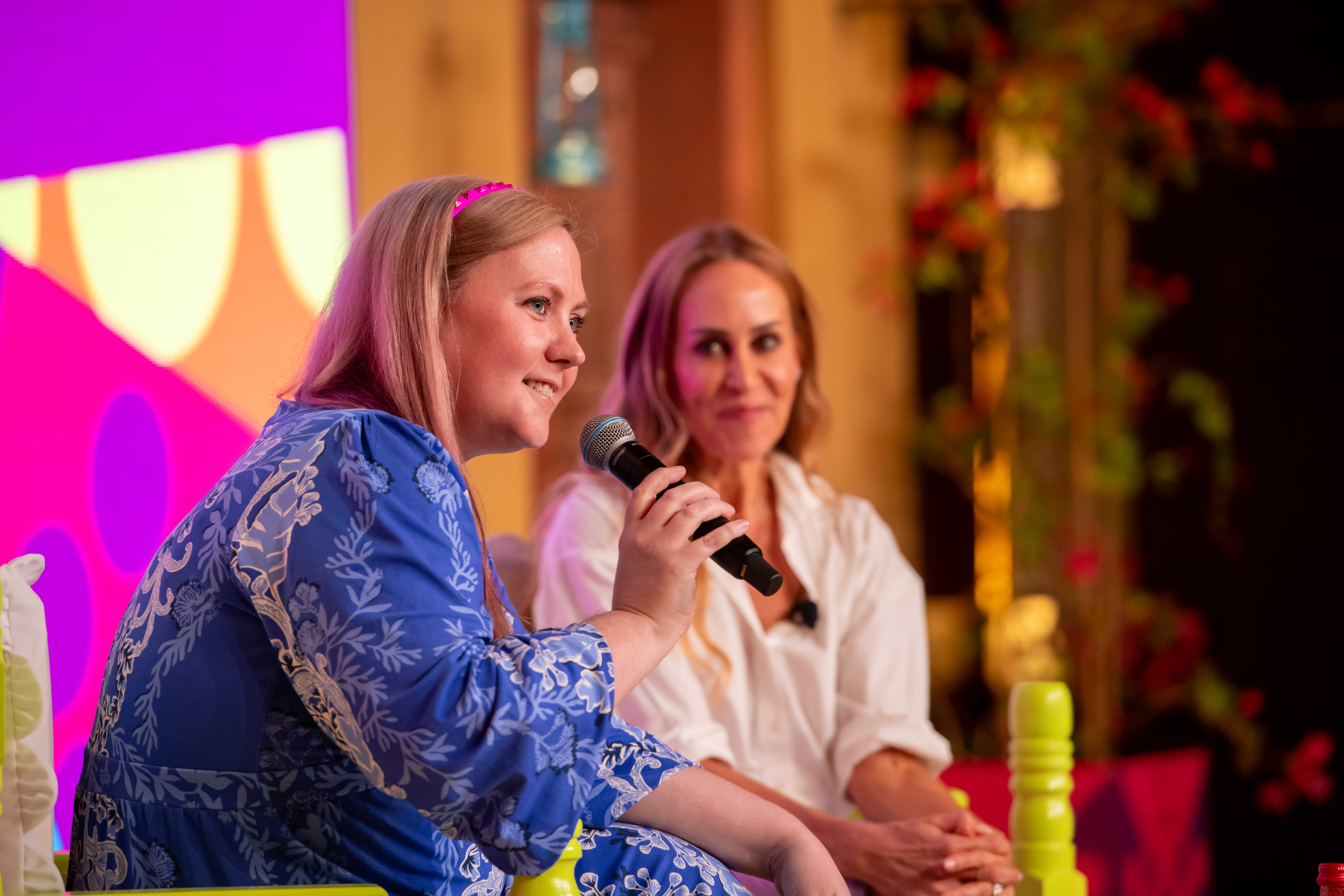
Rebecca Yarros speaking at Emirates Airline Festival of Literature 2024 in the United Arab Emirates after the release of Iron Flame.

Yarros has been accused of misusing the Scottish Gaelic language in her series after mispronouncing several Scottish Gaelic words from her novel during interviews leading up to Iron Flame’s release. This, along with the speed at which Iron Flame was released following Fourth Wing and various misprint issues, has led to comparisons between the current state of the publishing industry and fast fashion.

== Sequel ==
The Empyrean series is planned to contain five books. On December 26, 2023, Yarros posted a reel to her Instagram profile showing her “head[ing] back to Basgiath” to begin writing the next book following Iron Flame. On March 28, 2024 it was announced that the third book, Onyx Storm, will be released on January 21, 2025. The time between the publications of Iron Flame and Onyx Storm was longer than the time between the first two books due to Yarros’ health limitations, which were pushed in the expedited release of the first two installments of the series.

== Adaptation ==
A week prior to Iron Flame’s release, Variety announced Amazon MGM Studios acquired the rights to adapt the entire series for streaming. The deal includes Fourth Wing—which was released in May 2023—Iron Flame, and the three remaining books Yarros plans to write to conclude the series. Yarros is set to executive produce the series with Liz Pelletier, the founder of Entangled Publishing, and Liz Raposo, the president of Michael B. Jordan’s Outlier Society. Yarros is not set to have any writing credits in the series. The series has yet to be green lit.
