= Age management medicine =

Field of alternative medicine

Longevity medicine is a set of preventive healthcare practices that rely on biomarkers of aging, such as aging clocks, to keep the patient's biological and psychological age as near to peak performance as feasible throughout life. Biogerontology and precision medicine are some of the related fields. As of early 2020s it is a "fast developing field", according to an article in a Lancet specialty journal.

In the first decade of the 21st century, what was called "age management medicine" was considered a field of alternative medicine, and, as of 2007, was not recognized by the American Medical Association. Other names at this time included "antiaging medicine" and "regenerative medicine". Age management medicine is controversial. The field is underregulated and supported by insufficient scientific evidence. People who practice it open themselves up to legal liability on grounds of negligence–malpractice, warranty issues, and product liability. The use of growth hormone has been frequently recommended; however, such use is associated with cancer. Age management medicine is often promoted by anti-aging practitioners specializing in nutritional supplements and hormone-replacement, a practice that may lead to harmful side-effects.

== Anti-aging medicine ==
Anti-aging medicine has become a young and fast-growing medical specialty, as physicians who initially sought treatment for themselves have been trained and certified in the field by organizations such as the American Academy of Anti-Aging Medicine (A4M), co-founded by Dr. Robert M. Goldman and Ronald Klatz.

== Senolitics ==
Senolytic (from the words senescence and -lytic, "destroying") is a member of a class of small molecules undergoing basic research to determine if they can selectively induce senescent cell death and improve human health. The purpose of this research is to discover or develop agents to delay, prevent, alleviate, or reverse age-related diseases. Removal of senescent cells with senolytics has been proposed as a method of boosting immunity during aging.

A similar concept is "senostatic," which means suppressing aging.

== NMN Products ==
Dietary supplement companies aggressively promote NMN products claiming these benefits. NMN is a precursor to NAD+ biosynthesis, and dietary NMN supplementation has been shown to increase NAD+ concentrations and thus has the potential to mitigate aging-related disorders such as oxidative stress, DNA damage, neurodegeneration, and inflammatory responses. The potential benefits and risks of NMN supplementation as of 2023 are currently under study.

== See also ==
- Life extension
- Anti-aging movement
