= Onyx Storm =

2025 fantasy novel by Rebecca Yarros

- Author: Rebecca Yarros
- Language: English
- Series: The Empyrean
- Release number: 3
- Genre: New adult fiction; Fantasy romance
- Published: January 21, 2025
- Publisher: Red Tower Books (Entangled Publishing)
- Pages: 544
- ISBN: 978-1-64937-715-9
- Preceded by: Iron Flame
- Followed by: Threshing Day

Onyx Storm is a romantic fantasy novel written by Rebecca Yarros and published by Red Tower Books. Released on January 21, 2025, it is the third book in the fantasy romance Empyrean series, after Fourth Wing and Iron Flame.

The book was listed on bestseller charts by August 2024 due to pre-orders.

== Background ==
Onyx Storm is the third book in Rebecca Yarros's Empyrean series, which is planned to include five books. The first book, Fourth Wing, chronicles the protagonist Violet's first year at the fictional Basgiath War College, where she becomes a dragon rider. The second book, Iron Flame, follows Violet and her friends and allies as they work to fight evil magic-wielders.

Although Iron Flame (November 2023) came out only about six months after Fourth Wing (May 2023), Yarros said that she would not write Onyx Storm as quickly. It was ultimately scheduled for release on January 21, 2025, more than a year after Iron Flame's release.

When announcing the book's release, Yarros said it would include "politics, new adventures, old enemies and of course, dragons".

The book's cover was released on July 8, 2024. A reviewer from Today said that its dark design "signals an ominous turn in the series".

== Plot ==
After the events of Iron Flame, the kingdoms of Navarre and Poromiel, together with leaders of the recent revolution in Navarre's province of Tyrrendor, negotiate an uneasy alliance in order to fight an invading army of evil magic-wielders known as venin. Violet, Xaden, several allies, and their dragons and gryphons explore isles to the south of their continent, hoping to find more irids (dragons of Andarna's kind), gather information that might cure Xaden's transformation into a venin, and establish alliances to help Navarre and Poromiel in the war. While on this quest, they obtain manuscripts written by Violet's father and meet Xaden's mother, whom he hasn't seen since he was a child. They succeed in establishing alliances, though some members of the team are killed in the process. Finally, they meet a group of irids, but the irids reject Andarna due to disappointment at how she has been shaped by Navarre's warlike culture.

After Violet, Xaden, and their surviving companions return to the continent, venin attack Tyrrendor. One of the irids reappears and strengthens the magical wardstone that protects the province, turning the tide in the battle. He persuades Andarna to return with him to the other irids, and though Violet consents for Andarna to leave, she is grief-stricken by the loss. Then the powerful venin Theophanie captures Violet's sister Mira, leading to a climactic battle between a group of venin and the combined forces of Navarre, Poromiel, and Tyrrendor. During the battle, Andarna returns and Violet kills Theophanie, but Xaden draws more power from the earth, which advances his transformation into a venin. Twelve hours later, Violet awakens in confusion, hears reports of new murders and disappearances, and finds to her surprise that she appears to have just married Xaden. The novel ends on a mysterious cliffhanger.

== Characters ==
- Violet Sorrengail: The main protagonist, a dragon rider bonded with Tairn and Andarna. Her unique dual bond is central to her power, but the strain and potential vulnerabilities of this bond are explored throughout the story.
- Xaden Riorson: The Duke of Tyrrendor and a lieutenant rider, now venin. His leadership is crucial in the war against the venin, but his affliction poses a constant threat.
- Imogen Cardulo: A third-year Rider whose allegiance and motivations remain somewhat ambiguous. Her loyalty to Violet and Xaden will likely be tested, and her true allegiances may be revealed or shift.
- Quinn Hollis: A cadet at Basgiath War College whose potential or a possible betrayal is hinted at the war effort.
- Rhiannon Matthias: A second-year rider and Violet's best friend, providing emotional support.
- Sawyer Henrick: A cadet who continues to serve as a loyal rider despite a permanent injury.
- Garrick Tavis: A recently graduated dragon rider and Xaden's best friend.
- Ridoc Gamlyn: A second-year dragon rider and member of Violet's squad.
- Sloane Mairi: The daughter of a former Lord in Tyrrendor, whose ability to siphon magic proves vital.
- Aaric Graycastle, also known as Cam Tauri: King Tauri's third son and a first-year Rider, whose pre-cognition signet is revealed.
- Catriona Cordella: Xaden's ex-lover and a gryphon flier, whose family and position are significant to the alliance.
- Maren Zina: A flier cadet and friend to Cat, who joins Violet's squad.
- Bodhi Durran: A dragon rider, Xaden's younger cousin, and heir of Tyrrendor.
- Brennan Sorrengail: Violet and Mira's older brother, a dragon rider with powerful healing abilities.
- Mira Sorrengail: Violet and Brennan's sister, a First Lieutenant dragon rider.
- Halden Tauri: Prince of Navarre, son of King Tauri and brother of Aaric Graycastle.
- Dain Aetos: A dragon rider and son of General Aetos.
- Lynx: A first-year dragon rider.
- General Aetos: The Commanding General of Basgiath War College.
- Theophanie: A powerful silver-haired venin woman who wields storm magic and serves as a major antagonist.

== Release ==
Bookstores including Books-A-Million, Barnes & Noble, and Waterstones held events to celebrate the book's release. Some readers attended in costume. Screen Rant described these release parties as a good sign for the Empyrean series's potential as a franchise, drawing comparisons to Harry Potter and the Twilight series. Yarros has announced a book tour, to begin in Los Angeles on January 20, 2025, and end in Denver on February 2. In the first week following its publication, Onyx Storm sold 2.7 million copies, surpassing any other adult novel in the previous 20 years according to the data provider BookScan.

== Reception ==
Kelsey Hall of BookTrib called Onyx Storm "a thrilling and emotionally gripping fantasy" and praised the worldbuilding, relationships between characters, and storytelling. Good Housekeeping called the book fast-paced and said the cliffhanger ending would "leave fans wanting more".

Laura Hackett of The Times criticized the book, saying that she did not enjoy Iron Flame and Onyx Storm as much as Fourth Wing. She said Onyx Storm "removes the warm familiarity of school and replaces it with more and more outlandish dangers and complex magical terminology", and described the romantic elements as cringeworthy. For Hackett, the popularity of romantasy novels like Onyx Storm is a sign that some adults still want to read books that resemble young adult fiction, instead of moving on to "more challenging literature".

=== Awards ===
Year	Award	Category	Result	Ref.
2025	Goodreads Choice Awards	Romantasy	Won	
2025	Goodreads Choice Awards	Audiobook	Won	
2026	Astra Book Awards	Book of the Year	Won	

== See also ==
- BookTok
