= Outlive: The Science and Art of Longevity =

2023 book by Peter Attia

Outlive: The Science and Art of Longevity is a non-fiction health and wellness book authored by Peter Attia, a physician specializing in longevity, and co-written with journalist Bill Gifford. Published in March 2023, Outlive was listed on The New York Times Best Seller list in 2023 and 2024. The book is divided into three parts with 17 chapters in total, exploring various aspects of longevity.

== Synopsis ==
Outlive presents a guide to preventing age-related diseases and promoting longevity through lifestyle changes, emphasizing the importance of managing physical and emotional health. He sees longevity as encompassing two aspects: the length of life and the quality of life. Healthspan, a major theme in the book, refers to "the portion of life free from disability or disease." Attia identifies the "Four Horsemen" of aging as the primary causes of declining healthspan—heart disease, cancer, neurodegenerative disease, and type 2 diabetes. Attia advocates for early screening, personalized health management, and lifestyle adjustments such as improved sleep, regular exercise, a balanced diet, and emotional well-being. He integrates scientific research with practical, specific steps to optimize well-being and healthspan.

== Key themes ==
Reviewers have noted some of the following themes in the book.

=== Preventative healthcare ===
Attia promotes a proactive approach to healthcare, focusing on prevention rather than reactionary treatment. This includes early screening and personalized health strategies.

=== Diet and nutrition ===
He argues that many people are consuming too many calories without considering the nutritional quality of their meals, which contributes to poor health outcomes and shortened healthspan.

=== Exercise ===
Attia highly stresses the importance of lifelong exercise, while avoiding injury ("First, do thyself no harm.") and "cultivating safe, ideal movement patterns" and improving neuromuscular control (aka "stability"). He emphasizes the importance of intense exercise for maintaining health and longevity. He also stresses the significance of knowing and improving one's VO2 max, an indicator of cardiovascular fitness, to optimize one's healthspan.

=== Modern healthcare critique ===
Attia is critical of healthcare in the United States's reactive approach to patient care, which often focuses on treating symptoms (what he calls "Medicine 2.0"). He would rather address the root causes of chronic illnesses ("Medicine 3.0").

== Reception and reviews ==
Outlive has been extensively reviewed in English-speaking countries. The Economist and Apple Books, among others, ranked it as one of the best books of 2023.

Matthew Rees' review in the Wall Street Journal highlighted the book's focus on the need for proactive, prevention-focused healthcare practices to improve longevity through early screening, personalized nutrition, exercise, and emotional well-being. Another reviewer praised the book's approach to proactive healthcare.

A review published by The Petrie-Flom Center for Health Law Policy, Biotechnology, and Bioethics at Harvard Law School praised the book for its accessible insights into improving healthspan and mitigating diseases like Type 2 diabetes and neurodegenerative conditions, its storytelling and practical approach to personal health, while noting its limitations for those with unique health needs or older individuals.

A review by a former trauma surgeon acknowledges that Attia's recommendations are helpful. It critiques his interpretation of the Hippocratic oath, where he dismisses "do no harm" as essentially impossible, given the uncertainties inherent in many medical interventions, arguing that Attia's reliance on an emergency room anecdote overlooks the principle that "do no harm" doesn't mean "do nothing". Additionally, the reviewer states that Attia's recommendations for medications and screenings lack strong evidence, posing risks that outweigh potential benefits. The critique is written from a religious perspective, arguing that Christianity is the ultimate answer to our quest for eternal life.

Kirkus Reviews described Outlive as a “data- and anecdote-rich” guide to making scientifically informed lifestyle choices.The review noted Attia’s emphasis on the interconnected role of chronic diseases—such as diabetes, heart disease, cancer, and Alzheimer’s—in determining long-term health. It highlighted his focus on exercise, caloric intake, and individualized self-care within what he calls “Medicine 3.0,” praising his clear writing and avoidance of simplistic prescriptions.
