= Fourth Wing =

2023 fantasy novel by Rebecca Yarros

- Author: Rebecca Yarros
- Language: English
- Series: The Empyrean
- Release number: 1
- Genre: New adult fiction; Fantasy romance; Dystopian fiction
- Published: May 2, 2023
- Publisher: Red Tower Books (Entangled Publishing)
- Pages: 512
- ISBN: 978-1-64937-404-2
- Dewey Decimal: 813.6
- Followed by: Iron Flame

Fourth Wing is a new adult fantasy romance novel written by the American author Rebecca Yarros. It is the first book in the Empyrean series, following the journey of Violet Sorrengail, who is forced by her mother, General Sorrengail, to join the Basgiath War College and become a dragon rider in the kingdom of Navarre. Even though she has been trained her entire life to enter the Scribe Quadrant, Violet must endure deadly quests and competitions that push her to her limits while trying to avoid being killed by one of the most powerful riders in the quadrant, Xaden Riorson.

The book was published in the United States on May 2, 2023, by Red Tower Books, an imprint of Entangled Publishing. Its viral success within TikTok's reader community, BookTok, significantly contributed to its No. 1 ranking on The New York Times bestseller list. It won The International Book of the Year 2024 at the annual TikTok Book Awards. The book sold over two million copies in its first six months and has been translated into approximately 30 languages.

Yarros has mentioned in interviews that the idea for Fourth Wing emerged when her publisher announced that they were going to start a romantic fantasy line, prompting her to submit five proposals. After several reviews, her publisher selected the third idea, which explored the Empyrean world. The inspiration for the story stems from her fascination with dragons, her husband's military experience, and her personal struggles. Violet's physical fragility, as described in the book, was influenced by Yarros's own experience living with Ehlers-Danlos syndrome, a genetic disorder affecting both her and her children. Yarros has expressed a desire to represent people with chronic illnesses, showcasing that they can also be heroic.

== Plot summary ==
20-year old Violet Sorrengail is the youngest child of General Lilith Sorrengail, who leads the Basgiath War College in the kingdom of Navarre. Physically slight, Violet was trained her entire life to become a scribe like her late father but her mother instead orders her to become a dragon rider as well despite the protests of her older sister Lt. Mira Sorrengail, also a renowned rider.

Years earlier, General Sorrengail quelled a rebellion within the Navarrian province of Tyrrendor. As punishment, the rebels' children were branded with marks called relics and forced to enter Basgiath's Riders Quadrant. Violet is warned that marked ones may seek revenge on her because of her family. Upon arrival, she immediately encounters the infamous Xaden Riorson, a third-year student whose father Fen had led the rebellion and killed Violet's older brother Brennan before being executed by Lilith. The two take an immediate disliking to each other and Violet fears he will attempt to kill her.

To gain entry to the War College, new cadets must cross a parapet suspended high over a canyon and in the process Violet is nearly thrown to her death by the psychopathic Jack Barlowe but manages to escape unharmed. After surviving the crossing, she reunites with her childhood best friend and longtime crush Dain Aetos, a second-year cadet. Violet joins Fourth Wing under Xaden's command, with Dain as their squad leader and befriends fellow first-years Rhiannon Matthias, Ridoc Gamlyn and Sawyer Henrick.

When training starts, Violet struggles with hand-to-hand combat because of her frailty and is targeted by marked ones. She begins learning her sparring partners' names in advance and poisoning them to give herself an advantage. One night, she overhears the marked ones having a secret meeting and is caught by Riorson, who asks her to stay quiet and in exchange shows her how to improve her fighting skills. Despite their mutual hostility and her wariness of his reputation, Violet finds herself increasingly attracted to Xaden.

During the Threshing process, Riders seek to bond to a dragon, which will allow them to develop a magical power known as a signet. However, it also means that the rider's life becomes connected to their dragon and, should their dragon die, they will as well. During Threshing, Violet sees a small, golden dragon that Barlowe wants to kill for appearing weak. Though injured, Violet defends it from Barlowe's posse and is saved by an enormous black dragon named Tairn who, impressed by her fortitude, selects her. Violet also connects with the little dragon, Andarna, and as a result becomes the first rider ever to bond two dragons. Dain kisses Violet in the aftermath but she finds that she no longer has feelings for him.

One night, Tairn awakens Violet as she is about to be ambushed by six cadets. Xaden rescues her and kills the cadets with his signet that can wield shadows. Afterwards, Xaden arranges for Liam Mairi, his foster brother and a marked cadet, to protect Violet. Violet learns that Xaden saved her because Tairn is mated to Sgaeyl, his dragon. Because of this, Violet and Xaden's lives are now interconnected: should something happen to one of them or their dragon, the other will die as well. She kisses Xaden due to Tairn's feelings for Sgaeyl, which influence their feelings as well. Barlowe again tries to kill her during a sparring session, but she escapes by purposefully triggering his allergies.

Violet and Xaden discover that they can communicate telepathically through their dragons. Later, during War Games, First Wing and Fourth Wing face off. When Barlowe attacks Liam, Violet uses Andarna's power to freeze time and saves him. Violet's anger manifests into the rare and powerful signet to wield lightning, which she uses to cause a landslide that seemingly kills Barlowe. That night, Violet and Xaden have sex. She asks why he and his cousin Bodhi were out after curfew, to which Xaden replies that they were at a nearby military base but does not explain further.

In the final round of the War Games, Xaden, Violet and a group of marked ones are ordered to travel to an outpost in Athebyne, outside of the kingdom's magical boundaries (known as wards). Along the way they encounter a group of gryphon fliers from Poromiel, a neighboring nation that Navarre has been in conflict with for centuries, and Violet learns that Xaden has been secretly supplying weapons to them. She accuses him of treason, but he explains that the Poromish are under attack by the Venin, dark magic wielders that can only be killed with Navarrian weaponry. Since their wards repel them, Navarrians believe Venin to be fictitious and the government conceals their existence; the Tyrrish revolted because Navarre refused to aid Poromiel in the struggle. Even with the revelation, Violet feels betrayed and tells Xaden she no longer trusts him.

The group arrive at the outpost but find it deserted and shortly thereafter a nearby village is attacked by Venin. Xaden and Violet realize they were led into a trap by Dain's father Colonel Aetos, who found out about their trips to Athebyne when Dain used his memory reading signet on Violet without her knowing.

Despite the danger, Xaden's crew joins forces with the gryphon fliers to defend the village. The group suffers multiple casualties, including Liam. Using her lightning powers and Andarna's ability to stop time, Violet defeats the last Venin but is seriously wounded in the process. Xaden and the survivors take shelter in Aretia, an abandoned city in Tyrrendor. After three days, Violet awakens and is stunned to discover that Brennan is alive. Xaden vows to win Violet back.

== Books ==
- Fourth Wing (May 2023)
- Iron Flame (November 2023)
- Onyx Storm (January 2025)
- Threshing Day (September 29, 2026)
- Empyrean Book 4

== Characters ==
=== Main characters ===
- Violet Sorrengail: The protagonist and primary point-of-view character. Smaller and physically weaker than the other riders, she only joins the Riders Quadrant at the demand of her mother, General Lilith Sorrengail. She is assigned to Fourth Wing. In an unprecedented turn of events, she bonds to two dragons, Tairneanach, or "Tairn", a Black Morningstartail, behemoth of a dragon, and Andarnaurram, or "Andarna", a golden, feathertail dragon. Signets: Lightning Wielding (Through Tairn.)
- Xaden Riorson: A marked one, and wing leader of Fourth Wing who, through his bond with his dragon Sgaeyl, has the ability to wield shadows. He is the son of Fen Riorson, a rebellion leader who killed Violet's brother and was later killed by Violet's mother. Because of this, Xaden and Violet are incredibly hostile towards one another. Xaden is described as an extremely attractive person and is a love interest for Violet. Bonded to Sgaeyl, a navy-Blue Daggertail dragon.
- Dain Aetos: Violet's childhood best friend and son of Colonel Aetos. A second-year Rider, he is a squad leader in the Fourth Wing. Through his bond with his dragon Cath, he can read memories upon touching another person. He is a love interest for Violet. Bonded to Cath, a Red Swordtail; Signet: Retrocognition.
- Rhiannon Matthias: A first-year member of the Riders Quadrant who is assigned to Fourth Wing. She becomes Violet's best friend. Bonded to Feirge, a green, daggertail; Signet: Retrieval.
- Sawyer Henrick: A repeated first year, he and Rhiannon agree to help Violet with hand-to-hand combat if Violet tutors them in history. He becomes a good friend of Violet, Rhiannon, and Ridoc. Bonded to Sliseag, a red, swordtail dragon; Signet: Metallurgy.
- Ridoc Gamlyn: A first-year member of the Riders Quadrant who is assigned to Fourth Wing. He is very humorous and becomes a good friend of Violet, Rhiannon, and Sawyer. Bonded to Aotrom, a brown swordtail; Signet: Ice-Wielding.
- Liam Mairi: A first-year Rider who grew up with Xaden after their parents were killed for leading the rebellion. Bonded to Deigh, a red daggertail; Signet: Farsight.

=== Other Basgiath War College students ===
- Jack Barlowe: A violent first-year Rider who is assigned to First Wing and makes it his mission to kill Violet.
- Oren Seifert: A jealous first-year Rider who is assigned to First Wing and, like Jack, makes it his mission to kill Violet.
- Amber Mavis: A wing leader and a close friend of Dain.
- Imogen Cardulo: A second-year rider at Basgiath War College as a supportive friend to Xaden and a potential ally for Violet.
- Bodhi Durran: A second-year rider at Basgiath War College and Xaden's cousin.
- Garrick Tavis: Xaden's best friend since childhood, Garrick is characterized by his loyalty and steadfast nature.
- Jesinia Neilwart: A first-year in the Scribe Quadrant and Violet's friend.

=== Notable Navarre military officials ===
- Lilith Sorrengail: She is the Commanding General of Basgiath War College. Her signet is Storm Wielding, and she is bound to the Brown Dragon Aimsir. Lilith is known as a ruthless, stern, and powerful rider, which makes her respected and feared by those within and outside the Kingdom of Navarre. Lilith is also Asher Sorrengail's wife and Violet Sorrengail's mother. In addition, Lilith plays an important role in the life of Xaden Riorson, as she is responsible for the death of Fen Riorson.
- Mira Sorrengail: Violet's older sister and a graduate of Basgiath War College. She strongly opposes her mother's decision to force Violet into the Riders Quadrant. Bonded with Teine, a green, clubtail dragon; signet: ward extension.
- Augustine Melgren: General of all of Navarre's armies. His bonded black swordtail dragon, Codagh, gave rebellion relics to all of the rebels' children, or "the marked ones", offering some protection to them from Melgren's signet. Melgren is able to see the outcome of any battle, except when three or more marked ones are gathered.
- Colonel Aetos: Dain's father. Dragon and signet are unknown.

=== Additional notable characters ===
- Brennan Sorrengail: Violet's brother. Believed to be dead in Book One. Signet: mending. Bonded to an orange daggertail dragon named Marbh.
- Asher Sorrengail: Violet's father. He was a curator of the Scribe quadrant and a pivotal character in Violet's life. He dies from a heart attack shortly after Brennan's death.
- Fen Riorson: Xaden's father, Fen, was an infantryman and leader of the Tyrrish rebellion against the government of Navarre. Fen was a man of values who wanted Xaden to follow his footsteps. As a result of his actions against the government, as well as the death of Brennan Sorrengail, Fen Riorson was sentenced to death, with Lilith Sorrengail in charge of carrying out the execution.
- Professor Carr: A knowledgeable instructor at Basgiath War College who teaches Wielding.
- Professor Devera: A Captain in the Navarrian military and one of the Battle Brief instructors at Basgiath.
- Professor Emetterio: The combat instructor at Basgiath who also oversees the Gauntlet.
- Professor Kaori: A Colonel in the Navarrian military and the Dragonkind instructor at Basgiath.
- Professor Markham: A Colonel in the Navarrian military and a scribe who co-teaches Battle Brief at Basgiath.

== Reception ==
The book had a mostly positive critical reception. Publishers Weekly gave the book a starred review, praising its worldbuilding, characters, and "sexy dark academia aesthetic". Alana Joli Abbott, in a review for Paste, praised its use of familiar tropes and compared it favorably to fantasy series like Blood Trials by N.E. Davenport and A Court of Thorns and Roses by Sarah J. Maas. The book was one of the most borrowed titles in American public libraries during 2023 and 2024.

Fourth Wing became a viral phenomenon on BookTok, where the hashtags "#FourthWing" and "#RebeccaYarros" have more than a billion views combined. Its popularity led it to reach No. 1 on Amazon's bestseller list as well as the No. 1 spot on The New York Times Bestseller list, where it stayed for 18 weeks. It has been credited as helping to popularize the "romantasy" genre, which blends elements of romance and fantasy genres.

Kimberly Terasaki of The Mary Sue wrote about a phenomenon within the fandom of portraying Xaden, a primary love interest of the protagonist, as white in fan art despite the fact that he is described as dark-skinned in the book. Yarros also commented on the phenomenon and asserted that the character is not intended to be white.

There is a review available by Tamara Saarinen from the School Library Journal, who approached Fourth Wing from the perspective of a school library. She noted that the use of modern profanity and sexual scenes make this book more appropriate for older teen audiences. That said, she did give an overall positive verdict for school libraries, claiming it would attract “romantasy” fans.

The sequel, Iron Flame, was released on November 7, 2023. The third book, Onyx Storm, was released on January 21, 2025.

== Adaptations ==
=== Television series ===
In October 2023, Variety reported that a television adaptation of the series was in the works at Amazon MGM Studios. It was also revealed that Amazon and Outlier Society had acquired rights to all books in the series, with Rebecca Yarros and Liz Pelletier announced as executive producers of the series. In July 2024, Moira Walley-Beckett was announced to be the showrunner, but would later leave. Jac Schaeffer was in talks to replace her before Meredith Averill was announced to be the new showrunner.

In May 2026, Amazon Prime Video gave the series the greenlight, with Michael B. Jordan, Lisa Joy who will also direct the first episode, Jonathan Nolan and Athena Wickham joining as executive producers. In October 2026, Esther McGregor and Emilio Sakraya were cast as Violet Sorrengail and Xaden Riorson, respectively.

=== Graphic novel ===
In March 2025, Yarros announced graphic-novel adaptations are in the works for all three of books of The Empyrean series (Fourth Wing, Iron Flame, and Onyx Storm). Yarros has stated she will be adapting the text herself along with a team of comic creators. A total of six graphic-novels are planned to span all three books. This project is in partnership with Ten Speed Graphic, Piatkus, and Entangled Publishing. The first book is scheduled for release in April 2027.

A series of dramatised audiobooks were produced by American audiobook company GraphicAudio and released in 2023.
