= Rebecca Yarros =

American author (born 1981)

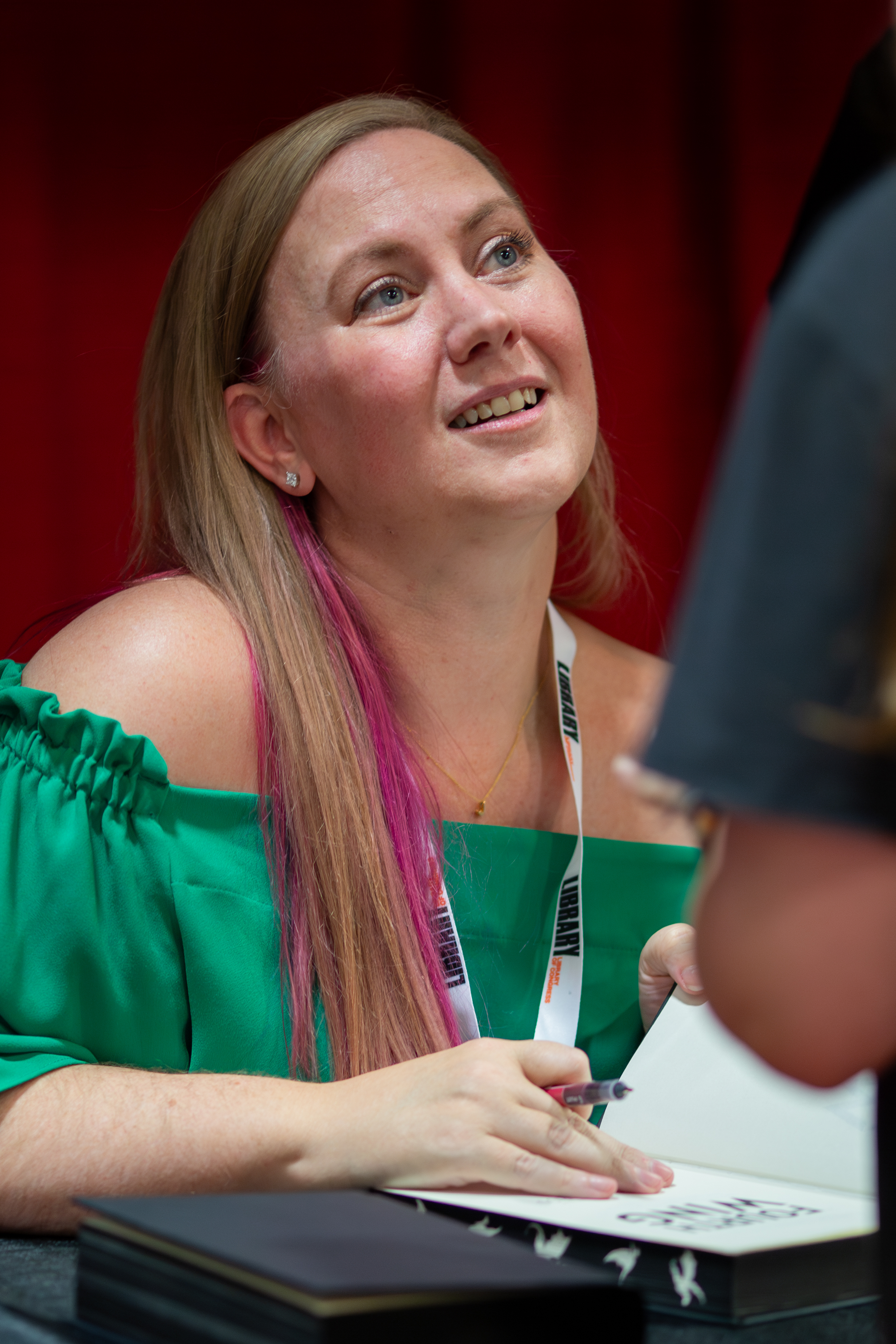
- Yarros at the 2024 National Book Festival
- Born: April 13, 1981 (age 45); Washington D.C., U.S.
- Education: Troy University
- Occupation: Novelist
- Children: 6
- Writing career
- Notable works: Fourth Wing; Iron Flame; Onyx Storm

Rebecca Yarros (born April 13, 1981) is an American author. She is best known for the Empyrean fantasy book series, which will be adapted into a television series with Amazon; Yarros will serve as a non-writing executive producer. Yarros graduated from Troy University, where she studied European history and English.

== Empyrean series ==
The first book in the Empyrean series, Fourth Wing, was published in April 2023 by Red Tower Books. In May, it landed fourth on the Libro.fm bestseller list. By late June, it was a number one bestseller on Amazon. As of August 2024, the book had spent 65 weeks on The New York Times Best Seller list, including in the top position. It also landed on the Libro.fm bestseller list in the second spot in August and third spot in September. Additionally, it was a top-ten book club pick for September. In October and November 2023, Fourth Wing was on USA Today's list of the top ten bestselling books. In March 2024 the title was shortlisted for the Young Adult Jury Award of the German Youth Literature Awards which was awarded at the Frankfurt Book Fair in October.

The sequel, Iron Flame, was released in November 2023. In July 2023, Waterstones indicated that it became the "fastest selling pre-order title in a single day on [the] website with [the] special edition selling out in just seven hours".

In October 2023, it was announced that Michael B. Jordan's Outlier Society and Amazon MGM Studios purchased the rights to adapt the novel series into a television series. Yarros and Entangled Publishing's Liz Pelletier will serve as non-writing executive producers.

The third book, Onyx Storm, was released in January 2025, and sold more than 2.7 million copies within the first week, according to The New York Times. Yarros has indicated that the series will ultimately include five books.

On September 29, 2026, Threshing Day was released as a companion volume to the series featuring 13 stories told from the perspectives of 13 different characters.

== Honors ==
In 2019, Kirkus Reviews included The Last Letter on their list of the year's best books.

Fourth Wing was an Amazon, Libro.fm, New York Times, and USA Today bestselling novel. It was also a top ten book club pick for September 2023. Booklist included it on their "Top 10 SF/Fantasy & Horror: 2023" list. In January 2024, Publishers Weekly listed Fourth Wing at #3 in its "Top 25 list of bestsellers for 2023".

In the same list, Iron Flame was listed at #6.

Year	Award	Category	Work	Result	Ref.
2014	Goodreads Choice Awards	Debut Goodreads Author	Full Measures	Nominated	
2023	Goodreads Choice Awards	Romance	In the Likely Event	Nominated	
2023	Goodreads Choice Awards	Romantasy	Fourth Wing	Won	
2024	Alex Awards	N/A	Fourth Wing	Won	
2024	Dragon Awards	Fantasy	Iron Flame	Won	
2024	British Book Awards	Fiction Book of the Year	Iron Flame	Nominated	
2024	British Book Awards	Page-turner of the Year	Fourth Wing	Won	
2024	Australian Book Industry Awards	International Book of the Year	Fourth Wing	Won	
2024	TikTok Book Awards	BookTok Book of the Year (International)	Fourth Wing	Won	
2025	New Adult Book Prize	N/A	Onyx Storm	Nominated	
2025	Goodreads Choice Awards	Romantasy	Onyx Storm	Won	
2025	Goodreads Choice Awards	Audiobook	Onyx Storm	Won	

== Personal life ==
Yarros began writing while her husband was deployed in Afghanistan. As of October 2023, she and her husband have six children.

Yarros has Ehlers–Danlos syndrome, as do her sons. Yarros and her husband initially fostered a daughter, eventually adopting her; their daughter is nonverbal and on the autism spectrum. Yarros and her husband co-founded a non-profit in 2019, OneOctober, dedicated to improving the lives of children in the foster system.

Yarros is a fan of the NHL team the Colorado Avalanche, and a Fourth Wing Night was held for a home game against the Buffalo Sabres on November 13, 2025.

== Publications ==
=== Standalone novels ===
- 1984: Against All Odds. WaWa Productions. 2016. (#5 in the multi-author Love in the 80s series)
- The Last Letter. Entangled. 2019. ISBN 9781640635333.
- Great and Precious Things. Entangled. 2020. ISBN 9781640638167.
- Muses & Melodies. Yarros Ink. 2020. (#3 in the multi-author Hush Note trilogy)
- The Things We Leave Unfinished. 2021. ISBN 978-1-68281-566-3.
- A Little Too Close. Yarros Ink. 2022. ISBN 9780997383164. (#2 in the multi-author Madigan Mountain trilogy)
- In the Likely Event. Montlake. 2023. ISBN 9781662511561.
- Variation. Montlake. 2024. ISBN 9781662514708.
- Peculiar Stars. Montlake. 2026. ISBN 9781662523298.

=== Empyrean Pentalogy ===
1. Fourth Wing. Red Tower Books. 2023. ISBN 9781649374042.
2. Iron Flame. Red Tower Books. 2023. ISBN 9781649374172.
3. Onyx Storm. Red Tower Books. 2025. ISBN 9781649377159.
- Threshing Day (short story collection). Red Tower Books. 2026.

=== Flight & Glory series ===
1. Full Measures. Entangled. 2014.
2. Eyes Turned Skyward. Entangled. 2014. ISBN 9781633751491.
3. Beyond What is Given. Entangled. 2015.
4. Hallowed Ground. Entangled. 2016.
5. The Reality of Everything. Independent. 2020.

=== In Luv duet ===
1. Girl in Luv. Co-written with Jay Crownover. Jay Crownover. 2019. ISBN 9781701202559.
2. Boy in Luv. Co-written with Jay Crownover. Jay Crownover. 2019. ISBN 9781701413047.

=== Legacy series ===
1. Point of Origin. 2016. ISBN 9780997383102.
2. Ignite. Yarros Ink. 2016.
3. Reason to Believe. Everafter Romance. 2022. ISBN 9781635765052.

=== Renegades trilogy ===
1. Wilder. Entangled. 2016. ISBN 9781682812686.
2. Nova. Entangled. 2017. ISBN 9781633757813.
3. Rebel. Entangled. 2017. ISBN 9781640631427.
