= Romantic fantasy =

Subgenre of fantasy fiction

Romantic fantasy, or "romantasy", is a subgenre of the broader genres of fantasy fiction and romance fiction that combines fantasy and romance, bringing to fantasy many of the elements and conventions of the romance genre. One of the key features of romantic fantasy involves the focus on relationships: social, political, and romantic.

Romantic fantasy has been published by both fantasy lines and romance lines. It can be defined as a fantasy where the plot is dependent on the romance such that it would not make sense if the romantic plot were removed. It has also been defined as stories which are romance-first within a secondary world. As a result of the financial success of authors such as Sarah J. Maas in the early 2020s publishers created imprints to focus on this subgenre. Some publishers distinguish between "romantic fantasy" where the fantasy elements are the most important and "fantasy romance" where the romance is the most important. Others say that "the borderline between fantasy romance and romantic fantasy has essentially ceased to exist, or if it's still there, it's moving back and forth constantly". Game historian Stu Horvath noted, "the heroes and heroines of romantic fantasy seek social connection and emotional wealth. Instead of carrying on by themselves, they find belonging in a community and a purpose larger than themselves. Magic and psychic abilities are often in-born talents; intelligent animals speak; and societies are egalitarian."

== History ==
=== Medieval and chivalric romance ===
Between the 12th and 15th centuries, stories about knights going on quests were popular. These quests frequently involved knights falling in love with noble ladies. They would also involve fantasy elements like dragons and magical places and objects. Examples from this period include The Romance of the Rose, a French poem that blends love and fantasy in an allegorical way; Le Morte d'Arthur by Thomas Malory, a collection of King Arthur stories, including the love story of Lancelot and Guinevere and set in the magical world of Camelot; and Tristan and Iseult, a famous tale about forbidden love between a knight and a queen that involves many fantasy elements and is considered one of the first stories to mix romance and magic in a way that influenced later fantasy romance books. There were even poems and stories composed during the medieval period which prominently featured romantic love between a human and a fantastical creature such as Lanval, one of the lais of Marie de France. The narrative tells the story of the love between a knight and a fairy lady in the setting of King Arthur's court and the events surrounding it.

=== Renaissance ===
In this era, romance and fantasy became more centred on theatre and poetry. Edmund Spenser's The Faerie Queene is a poem written in the late 1500s that combines knights, love stories, and magical creatures. It has had a large influence on modern romantic fantasy because it demonstrates a blend of romantic themes with fantasy world building. William Shakespeare's plays, such as A Midsummer Night's Dream and The Tempest, feature fairies, magic, and love. Despite the fact that Shakespeare was not considered a fantasy author, these plays mix romance with fantasy, setting a template for later fantasy romance works.

=== Origins of modern romantic fantasy ===
Emma Bull's War for the Oaks, published in 1987, follows a human woman who becomes drafted into a war between faeries and ends up falling in love with the same person who put her in danger. The fantasy is very rich in Irish mythology, but also strongly features romance at the center of the story's plot. There also exist many thematic and structural similarities between "Romantasy" and the more specific urban fantasy subgenre of Paranormal Romance which experienced its own popularity boom in the late 1990s to 2000s. Notably, both the fantasy and romance genres were viewed to have less literary merit up until the late 20th century. Despite this, they have become incredibly popular today.

=== 2023–2024: social media trend ===
In 2023 and 2024, romantic fantasy novels termed "romantasy" became a social media trend. Sales of the books have been widely driven by promotion on social media, particularly the subcommunity of TikTok known as BookTok. Writer's Digest notes that much of the credit for the rise in the romantic fantasy genre can be attributed to platforms such as TikTok, where word spreads more efficiently in speed and "influenceability." The Economist notes that the genre has particular appeal to those who grew up reading young-adult fantasy, such as Harry Potter, and are now interested in similar themes, but with adult themes of sex and romance. Popular authors in the genre include Rebecca Yarros, whose Fourth Wing, Iron Flame, and Onyx Storm have all broken sales records and are due to be made into a TV series, and Sarah J. Maas. Authors of novels labeled as romantasy are largely women, as is the market, and the novels are known for representing minorities.

== Gender discussion in romantic fantasy ==
There is a complex discussion surrounding romantic fantasy and whether they are examples of female empowerment or if they enforce misogyny and sexism. Some believe that these stories are feminist because they portray strong female characters that are warriors and heroines, frequently empower women, embrace their sexuality, and subvert gender roles such as the damsel in distress trope. There is also a widespread belief that these stories are inherently feminist because they are primarily written for and enjoyed by women, as the majority of readers of romantic fiction novels are women between the ages of 18 to 44.

On the other hand, others believe that these stories uphold patriarchy due to the fact that they often tie a woman's strength and empowerment to her male love interest or to her traditionally masculine traits such as aggression, physical strength, and stoicism. There is also an argument that romantic fantasy frequently portrays men in a way that strongly adheres to gender roles. Male love interests tend to be strong, ruthless men in positions of power who have tragic backstories and are rarely emotionally vulnerable, only ever breaking their stoic facade and showing emotions for their female partners once the romance blooms.

== Notable examples of romantic fantasy ==
Some examples of media in the romantic fantasy subgenre include:

=== Literature ===
- The Twilight Saga by Stephenie Meyer – A love story between Bella Swan, a human girl, and Edward Cullen, a vampire, set in a world where supernatural beings coexist with humans.
- The Folk of the Air series by Holly Black
- Empyrean series by Rebecca Yarros (Fourth Wing, Iron Flame, Onyx Storm)
- The Princess Bride (1973) by William Goldman – Set in a magical world and features the romantic relationship between Princess Buttercup and her true love, Westley.
- A Court of Thorns and Roses series by Sarah J. Maas – Feyre Archeon, a human female in the main character of which most of the novels. in this series revolve around, gradually bringing the readers into the complex world of the story/stories.
- The Immortals series by Tamora Pierce
- Lost Continent (aka Aronsdale) series by Catherine Asaro
- Tales of the Five Hundred Kingdoms series by Mercedes Lackey
- The Princess and the Goblin (1872) by George MacDonald

=== Films ===
- Beauty and the Beast (1991) – Disney's animated adaptation of the classic fairy tale, which focuses on the romantic relationship between Belle, a young woman, and the Beast, a prince who is magically transformed into a monster as punishment for his arrogance and cruelty.
- The Last: Naruto the Movie (2014) – a canonical adaptation and epilogue of Japanese manga series Naruto and its anime adaptation, which focuses on the romantic relationship between Naruto Uzumaki and Hinata Hyuga while on a mission to rescue Hanabi Hyuga, Hinata's younger sister, from a mysterious villain Toneri Otsutsuki.
- The Little Mermaid (1989) – Disney's animated adaptation of Hans Christian Andersen's story, centred around the romance between a mermaid and a human prince, as she sacrifices much for love.
- The Princess Bride (1987) – The film adaptation of William Goldman's novel, which is set in a magical world and features the romantic relationship between Princess Buttercup and her true love, Westley.
- Twilight film series (2008–2012) – The film adaptations of Stephenie Meyer's novels, focusing on the supernatural love story between a human girl and a vampire.
- The Shape of Water (2017) – Follows a mute cleaner at a high-security government laboratory who falls in love with a captured humanoid amphibian creature.
- Edward Scissorhands (1990) – A story set in a visually fantastical world which focuses on Edward, an unfinished artificial humanoid that has scissors for hands, who falls in love with Kim, a teenage girl in an American suburban neighborhood.
- Ghost (1990) – Focuses on a murdered banker, whose ghost sets out to save his girlfriend from the person who killed him, through the help of a psychic.
- Legend (1985) – A magical adventure in which Princess Lily and a hero named Jack must thwart the Lord of Darkness's evil plot to cover the world in eternal night.
- Cinderella (1950) – Disney's animated film adaptation of the classic European folk tale, which centers around the romantic relationship between Cinderella and Prince Charming, in a magical fairy-tale world.
- Your Name (2016) – A romantic fantasy anime, where two high school students suddenly begin to swap bodies despite having never met, unleashing chaos onto each other's lives.

=== Television ===
- Buffy the Vampire Slayer (1997–2003) – A cult TV series that focuses on the adventures of the teenage girl Buffy who was chosen to fight vampires and various other creatures, as well as exploring her romantic relationship with the vampire Angel.
- True Blood (2008–2014) – A TV adaptation of The Southern Vampire Mysteries book series by Charlaine Harris. The series is set in a world where vampires coexist with humans and it features the romantic relationship between a telepathic waitress and a mysterious vampire.
- Beauty and the Beast (1987–1990) – A modern retelling of the classic fairy tale which is set in New York during the late 1980s and focuses on the romance between Catherine, a successful lawyer, and Vincent, a mysterious, lion-like man who lives in the tunnels beneath the city.

== See also ==
- Romance novel
- Medieval fantasy
- Paranormal Romance
