= Libby Book Awards =

Annual literary award series

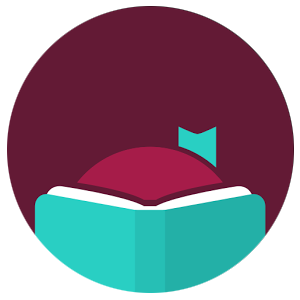
- Awarded for: Best books among various genres
- Presented by: Libby
- First award: 2024

The Libby Book Awards are a series of annual literary awards presented by the digital book service Libby. The awards were launched in 2024, with the finalists being announced alongside the creation of the awards in February 2024 and the inaugural winners being declared on March 12, 2024.

== Categories ==
The inaugural set of awards were given in the following categories: Fiction, Nonfiction, Young Adult, Audiobook, Debut Author, Diverse Author, Comic Graphic Novel, Memoir & Autobiography, Cookbook, Mystery, Thriller, Romance, Fantasy, Romantasy, Science Fiction, Historical Fiction, and Book Club Pick. The nominations were picked and voted on by over 1,700 librarians.

The 2025 edition of the awards removed the Diverse Author category, and added new categories Business Book, Horror, Middle Grade, and Picture Book.

For 2026, the awards dropped the Business Book category, and added a new category for Personal Improvement Books. It also created a Readers' Choice category, in which non-librarians could vote for a book.

== Libby Book Awards ==
Libby Book Award (2024-present)
Year	Category	Author	Title	Result
2024	Fiction	James McBride	The Heaven & Earth Grocery Store	Won
2024	Fiction	Ann Patchett	Tom Lake	Honor
2024	Fiction	Eleanor Catton	Birnam Wood	Finalist
2024	Fiction	Jesmyn Ward	Let Us Descend	Finalist
2024	Fiction	Zadie Smith	The Fraud	Finalist
2024	Nonfiction	David Grann	The Wager	Won
2024	Nonfiction	Jonathan Rosen	The Best Minds	Finalist
2024	Nonfiction	Ilyon Woo	Master Slave Husband Wife	Finalist
2024	Nonfiction	Claire Dederer	Monsters	Finalist
2024	Nonfiction	Donovan X. Ramsey	When Crack Was King	Finalist
2024	Young Adult Fiction	Rebecca Ross	Divine Rivals	Won
2024	Young Adult Fiction	Isabel Ibañez	What the River Knows	Honor
2024	Young Adult Fiction	Brandy Colbert	The Blackwoods	Finalist
2024	Young Adult Fiction	Krystal Marquis	The Davenports	Finalist
2024	Young Adult Fiction	Angeline Boulley	Warrior Girl Unearthed	Finalist
2024	Audiobook	Rebecca Makkai	I Have Some Questions for You	Won
2024	Audiobook	S. A. Cosby	All the Sinners Bleed	Finalist
2024	Audiobook	Jonathan Eig	King: A Life	Finalist
2024	Audiobook	Matthew Desmond	Poverty, By America	Finalist
2024	Audiobook	Mick Herron	The Secret Hours	Finalist
2024	Debut Author	Ana Reyes	The House in the Pines	Won
2024	Debut Author	Selby Wynn Schwartz	After Sappho	Finalist
2024	Debut Author	Nana Kwame Adjei-Brenyah	Chain-Gang All Stars	Finalist
2024	Debut Author	Mac Crane	I Keep Exoskeletons to Myself	Finalist
2024	Debut Author	Alice Winn	In Memoriam	Finalist
2024	Diverse Author	Michelle Min Sterling	Camp Zero	Won
2024	Diverse Author	Stephen Kearse	Liquid Snakes	Finalist
2024	Diverse Author	Victor LaValle	Lone Women	Finalist
2024	Diverse Author	Annalee Newitz	The Terraformers	Finalist
2024	Diverse Author	Chana Porter	The Thick and the Lean	Finalist
2024	Comic/Graphic Novel	Darrin Bell	The Talk	Won
2024	Comic/Graphic Novel	E. M. Carroll	A Guest in the House	Finalist
2024	Comic/Graphic Novel	Tom King and Mitch Gerads	One Bad Day: The Riddler (Batman)	Finalist
2024	Comic/Graphic Novel	Jillian Tamaki and Mariko Tamaki	Roaming	Finalist
2024	Comic/Graphic Novel	Deena Mohamed	Shubeik Lubeik	Finalist
2024	Memoir & Autobiography	Elliot Page	Pageboy	Won
2024	Memoir & Autobiography	Naomi Klein	Doppelganger	Finalist
2024	Memoir & Autobiography	Safiya Sinclair	How to Say Babylon	Finalist
2024	Memoir & Autobiography	Barbra Streisand	My Name is Barbra	Finalist
2024	Memoir & Autobiography	Maggie Smith	You Could Make This Place Beautiful	Finalist
2024	Cookbook	Sohla El-Waylly	Start Here	Won
2024	Cookbook	Dan Pelosi	Let's Eat	Honor
2024	Cookbook	Leah Koenig	Portico	Finalist
2024	Cookbook	Erika Council	Still We Rise	Finalist
2024	Cookbook	Hetty Lui McKinnon	Tenderheart	Finalist
2024	Mystery	Jesse Q. Sutanto	Vera Wong's Unsolicited Advice for Murderers	Won
2024	Mystery	Deepti Kapoor	Age of Vice	Finalist
2024	Mystery	Angie Kim	Happiness Falls	Finalist
2024	Mystery	Brendan Slocumb	Symphony of Secrets	Finalist
2024	Mystery	Richard Osman	The Last Devil to Die	Finalist
2024	Thriller	Jessica Knoll	Bright Young Women	Won
2024	Thriller	S. A. Cosby	All the Sinners Bleed	Finalist
2024	Thriller	Catherine Chidgey	Pet	Finalist
2024	Thriller	Ayesha Manazir Siddiqi	The Centre	Finalist
2024	Thriller	Mick Herron	The Secret Hours	Finalist
2024	Romance	Kate Clayborn	Georgie, All Along	Won
2024	Romance	Cat Sebastian	We Could Be So Good	Honor
2024	Romance	Liana De la Rosa	Ana María and the Fox	Finalist
2024	Romance	Rachel Lynn Solomon	Business or Pleasure	Finalist
2024	Romance	KJ Charles	A Nobleman's Guide to Seducing a Scoundrel	Finalist
2024	Fantasy	Rebecca Yarros	Fourth Wing	Won
2024	Fantasy	Samantha Shannon	A Day of Fallen Night	Finalist
2024	Fantasy	Leigh Bardugo	Hell Bent	Finalist
2024	Fantasy	Moniquill Blackgoose	To Shape a Dragon's Breath	Finalist
2024	Fantasy	Martha Wells	Witch King	Finalist
2024	Romantasy	Rebecca Yarros	Iron Flame	Won
2024	Romantasy	Heather Fawcett	Emily Wilde's Encyclopaedia of Faeries	Finalist
2024	Romantasy	Chloe Gong	Immortal Longings	Finalist
2024	Romantasy	Alexis Hall	Mortal Follies	Finalist
2024	Romantasy	Thea Guanzon	The Hurricane Wars	Finalist
2024	Science Fiction	Martha Wells	System Collapse	Won
2024	Science Fiction	M. R. Carey	Infinity Gate	Finalist
2024	Science Fiction	Emily Tesh	Some Desperate Glory	Finalist
2024	Science Fiction	Yume Kitasei	The Deep Sky	Finalist
2024	Science Fiction	Ann Leckie	Translation State	Finalist
2024	Historical Fiction	Jesmyn Ward	Let Us Descend	Won
2024	Historical Fiction	David Diop	Beyond the Door of No Return	Finalist
2024	Historical Fiction	Tania James	Loot	Finalist
2024	Historical Fiction	Daniel Mason	North Woods	Finalist
2024	Historical Fiction	Rachel Heng	The Great Reclamation	Finalist
2024	Book Club Pick	R. F. Kuang	Yellowface	Won
2024	Book Club Pick	Ann Napolitano	Hello Beautiful	Finalist
2024	Book Club Pick	Jessica George George	Maame	Finalist
2024	Book Club Pick	Ann Patchett	Tom Lake	Finalist
2024	Book Club Pick	Nathan Hill	Wellness	Finalist
2025	Fiction	Kristin Hannah	The Women	Won
2025	Fiction	Percival Everett	James	Honor
2025	Fiction	Liz Moore	The God of the Woods	Finalist
2025	Fiction	Taffy Brodesser-Akner	Long Island Compromise	Finalist
2025	Fiction	Richard Powers	Playground	Finalist
2025	Nonfiction	Erik Larson	The Demon of Unrest	Won
2025	Nonfiction	Rebecca Nagle	By the Fire We Carry	Honor
2025	Nonfiction	Adam Higginbotham	Challenger	Finalist
2025	Nonfiction	Malcolm Gladwell	Revenge of the Tipping Point	Finalist
2025	Nonfiction	Hanif Abdurraqib	There's Always This Year	Finalist
2025	Young Adult Fiction	Sabaa Tahir	Heir	Won
2025	Young Adult Fiction	Jason Reynolds	Twenty-Four Seconds from Now	Honor
2025	Young Adult Fiction	Olivia A. Cole	Ariel Crashes a Train	Finalist
2025	Young Adult Fiction	C. G. Drews	Don't Let the Forest In	Finalist
2025	Young Adult Fiction	K. A. Cabell	Looking for Smoke	Finalist
2025	Audiobook	Erik Larson, read by Will Patton and Erik Larson	The Demon of Unrest	Won
2025	Audiobook	Kaveh Akbar, read by Arian Moayed	Martyr!	Honor
2025	Audiobook	Sylvie Cathrall, read by Claire Morgan, Joshua Riley, Justin Avoth and Kit Griffiths	A Letter to the Luminous Deep	Finalist
2025	Audiobook	Simon Van Booy, read by Christine Rendel	Sipsworth	Finalist
2025	Audiobook	Alina Grabowski, read by Abigail Reno, EJ Lavery, Maria McCann, Vernonica Giguere & Jordan Claire McCraw	Women and Children First	Finalist
2025	Debut Author	Kaliane Bradley	The Ministry of Time	Won
2025	Debut Author	Natalie Sue	I Hope This Finds You Well	Honor
2025	Debut Author	Rita Bullwinkel	Headshot	Finalist
2025	Debut Author	Kaveh Akbar	Martyr!	Finalist
2025	Debut Author	Essie Chambers	Swift River	Finalist
2025	Book Club Pick	Rufi Thorpe	Margo's Got Money Troubles	Won
2025	Book Club Pick	Rachel Khong	Real Americans	Honor
2025	Book Club Pick	Danzy Senna	Colored Television	Finalist
2025	Book Club Pick	Louise Erdrich	The Mighty Red	Finalist
2025	Book Club Pick	Betsy Lerner	Shred Sisters	Finalist
2025	Business Book	Denise Young	When We Are Seen	Won
2025	Business Book	Mary C. Murphy	Cultures of Growth	Honor
2025	Business Book	Peg Fitzpatrick	The Art of Small Business Social Media	Finalist
2025	Business Book	Salman Khan	Brave New Words	Finalist
2025	Business Book	Steven G. Rogelberg	Glad We Met	Finalist
2025	Comic/Graphic Novel	Tessa Hulls	Feeding Ghosts	Won
2025	Comic/Graphic Novel	Maurice Vellekoop	I'm So Glad We Had This Time Together	Honor
2025	Comic/Graphic Novel	Takeru Hokazono	Kagurabachi, Volume 1	Finalist
2025	Comic/Graphic Novel	Daniel Warren Johnson	Transformers	Finalist
2025	Comic/Graphic Novel	Richard Adams	Watership Down	Finalist
2025	Cookbook	Dan Pashman	Anything's Pastable	Won
2025	Cookbook	Janusz Domagala	Baking with Pride	Honor
2025	Cookbook	Khushbu Shah	Amrikan	Finalist
2025	Cookbook	Steve Sando	The Bean Book	Finalist
2025	Cookbook	Christine De Witte	Noodles, Rice, and Everything Spice	Finalist
2025	Fantasy	Sarah Beth Durst	The Spellshop	Won
2025	Fantasy	Leigh Bardugo	The Familiar	Honor
2025	Fantasy	Lev Grossman	The Bright Sword	Finalist
2025	Fantasy	Danielle L. Jensen	A Fate Inked in Blood	Finalist
2025	Fantasy	Tigest Girma	Immortal Dark	Finalist
2025	Historical Fiction	Percival Everett	James	Won
2025	Historical Fiction	Silvia Moreno-Garcia	The Seventh Veil of Salome	Honor
2025	Historical Fiction	Carys Davies	Clear	Finalist
2025	Historical Fiction	Kevin Barry	The Heart in Winter	Finalist
2025	Historical Fiction	Claire Messud	This Strange Eventful History	Finalist
2025	Horror	Chuck Tingle	Bury Your Gays	Won
2025	Horror	Stephen Graham Jones	I Was a Teenage Slasher	Honor
2025	Horror	Paul Tremblay	Horror Movie	Finalist
2025	Horror	Kailee Pedersen	Sacrificial Animals	Finalist
2025	Horror	Mariana Enriquez	A Sunny Place for Shady People	Finalist
2025	Memoir & Autobiography	Salman Rushdie	Knife	Won
2025	Memoir & Autobiography	Sloane Crosley	Grief Is for People	Honor
2025	Memoir & Autobiography	Carvell Wallace	Another Word for Love	Finalist
2025	Memoir & Autobiography	Lydia Millet	We Loved It All	Finalist
2025	Memoir & Autobiography	Deborah Jackson Taffa	Whiskey Tender	Finalist
2025	Middle Grade Book	Katherine Rundell	Impossible Creatures	Won
2025	Middle Grade Book	Tony Weaver Jr.	Weirdo	Honor
2025	Middle Grade Book	Kate DiCamillo	Ferris	Finalist
2025	Middle Grade Book	John Schu	Louder Than Hunger	Finalist
2025	Middle Grade Book	Allie Millington	Olivetti	Finalist
2025	Mystery	Richard Osman	We Solve Murders	Won
2025	Mystery	Tana French	The Hunter	Honor
2025	Mystery	Ruby Todd	Bright Objects	Finalist
2025	Mystery	Francis Spufford	Cahokia Jazz	Finalist
2025	Mystery	Jahmal Mayfield	Smoke Kings	Finalist
2025	Picture Book	Akiko Miyakoshi	Little Shrew	Won
2025	Picture Book	X. Fang	We Are Definitely Human	Honor
2025	Picture Book	Oliver Jeffers and Sam Winston	The Dictionary Story	Finalist
2025	Picture Book	Lesa Cline-Ransome, illustrated by James E. Ransome	Fighting with Love	Finalist
2025	Picture Book	Breanna J. McDaniel, illustrated by April Harrison	Go Forth and Tell	Finalist
2025	Romance	Emily Henry	Funny Story	Won
2025	Romance	Danica Nava	The Truth According to Ember	Honor
2025	Romance	Adib Khorram	I'll Have What He's Having	Finalist
2025	Romance	KT Hoffman	The Prospects	Finalist
2025	Romance	Kennedy Ryan	This Could Be Us	Finalist
2025	Romantasy	Sarah J. Maas	House of Flame and Shadow	Won
2025	Romantasy	Saara El-Arifi	Faebound	Honor
2025	Romantasy	Mai Corland	Five Broken Blades	Finalist
2025	Romantasy	Hannah Whitten	The Hemlock Queen	Finalist
2025	Romantasy	Alexandria Warwick	The North Wind	Finalist
2025	Science Fiction	Kaliane Bradley	The Ministry of Time	Won
2025	Science Fiction	Yume Kitasei	The Stardust Grail	Honor
2025	Science Fiction	Marie-Helene Bertino	Beautyland	Finalist
2025	Science Fiction	Helen Phillips	Hum	Finalist
2025	Science Fiction	James S. A. Corey	The Mercy of Gods	Finalist
2025	Thriller	Nicola Yoon	One of Our Kind	Won
2025	Thriller	Abbott Kahler	Where You End	Honor
2025	Thriller	Matthew Blake	Anna O	Finalist
2025	Thriller	Thomas Perry	Hero	Finalist
2025	Thriller	Jesse Q. Sutanto	You Will Never Be Me	Finalist
2026	Adult Fiction	Taylor Jenkins Reid	Atmosphere	Won
2026	Adult Fiction	Patrick Ryan	Buckeye	Honor
2026	Adult Fiction	Megha Majumdar	A Guardian and a Thief	Finalist
2026	Adult Fiction	Kiran Desai	The Loneliness of Sonia and Sunny	Finalist
2026	Adult Fiction	Angela Flournoy	The Wilderness	Finalist
2026	Adult Nonfiction	Sophie Elmhirst	A Marriage at Sea	Won
2026	Adult Nonfiction	Haley Cohen Gilliland	A Flower Traveled in My Blood	Honor
2026	Adult Nonfiction	Imani Perry	Black in Blues	Finalist
2026	Adult Nonfiction	Robert Macfarlane	Is a River Alive?	Finalist
2026	Adult Nonfiction	Siddharth Kara	The Zorg	Finalist
2026	Young Adult Fiction	Suzanne Collins	Sunrise on the Reaping	Won
2026	Young Adult Fiction	Angeline Boulley	Sisters in the Wind	Honor
2026	Young Adult Fiction	Mahogany L. Browne	A Bird in the Air Means We Can Still Breathe	Finalist
2026	Young Adult Fiction	Jihyun Yun	And The River Drags Her Down	Finalist
2026	Young Adult Fiction	Tiffany D. Jackson	The Scammer	Finalist
2026	Audiobook	Fredrik Backman	My Friends	Won
2026	Audiobook	R. F. Kuang	Katabasis	Honor
2026	Audiobook	Virginia Evans	The Correspondent	Finalist
2026	Audiobook	Garrett M. Graff	The Devil Reached Toward the Sky	Finalist
2026	Audiobook	Laila Lalami	The Dream Hotel	Finalist
2026	Debut Author	SenLinYu	Alchemised	Won
2026	Debut Author	Virginia Evans	The Correspondent	Honor
2026	Debut Author	Patrick Ryan	Buckeye	Finalist
2026	Debut Author	Florence Knapp	The Names	Finalist
2026	Debut Author	Eliana Ramage	To the Moon and Back	Finalist
2026	Book Club Pick	Catherine Newman	Wreck	Won
2026	Book Club Pick	Anna North	Bog Queen	Honor
2026	Book Club Pick	Bruce Holsinger	Culpability	Finalist
2026	Book Club Pick	Lily King	Heart the Lover	Finalist
2026	Book Club Pick	Laila Lalami	The Dream Hotel	Finalist
2026	Comic/Graphic Novel	Alison Bechdel	Spent	Won
2026	Comic/Graphic Novel	Kelly Thompson, Hayden Sherman, Mattia De Iulis	Absolute Wonder Woman: Volume 1	Honor
2026	Comic/Graphic Novel	Ben Passmore	Black Arms to Hold You Up	Finalist
2026	Comic/Graphic Novel	Lee Lai	Cannon	Finalist
2026	Comic/Graphic Novel	Joe Sacco	The Once and Future Riot	Finalist
2026	Cookbook	B. Dylan Hollis	Baking Across America	Won
2026	Cookbook	Sean Sherman	Turtle Island	Honor
2026	Cookbook	Rick Martinez	Salsa Daddy	Finalist
2026	Cookbook	Joshua McFadden	Six Seasons of Pasta	Finalist
2026	Cookbook	Alison Roman	Something from Nothing	Finalist
2026	Fantasy	V. E. Schwab	Bury Our Bones in the Midnight Soil	Won
2026	Fantasy	SenLinYu	Alchemised	Honor
2026	Fantasy	R. F. Kuang	Katabasis	Finalist
2026	Fantasy	James Islington	The Strength of the Few	Finalist
2026	Fantasy	Sotto Yambao	Water Moon	Finalist
2026	Historical Fiction	Allegra Goodman	Isola	Won
2026	Historical Fiction	Karen Russell	The Antidote	Honor
2026	Historical Fiction	Nathan Harris	Amity	Finalist
2026	Historical Fiction	Xenobe Purvis	The Hounding	Finalist
2026	Historical Fiction	Andrew Miller	The Land in Winter	Finalist
2026	Horror	Stephen Graham Jones	The Buffalo Hunter Hunter	Won
2026	Horror	Silvia Moreno-Garcia	The Bewitching	Honor
2026	Horror	Kylie Lee Baker	Bat Eater and Other Names for Cora Zeng	Finalist
2026	Horror	Nat Cassidy	When the Wolf Comes Home	Finalist
2026	Horror	Andrew Joseph White	You Weren’t Meant to Be Human	Finalist
2026	Memoir & Autobiography	Omar El Akkad	One Day, Everyone Will Have Always Been Against This	Won
2026	Memoir & Autobiography	Chloe Dalton	Raising Hare	Honor
2026	Memoir & Autobiography	Geraldine Brooks	Memorial Day	Finalist
2026	Memoir & Autobiography	Arundhati Roy	Mother Mary Comes to Me	Finalist
2026	Memoir & Autobiography	Yiyun Li	Things in Nature Merely Grow	Finalist
2026	Middle Grade Book	ND Stevenson	Scarlet Morning	Won
2026	Middle Grade Book	Renée Watson	All the Blues in the Sky	Honor
2026	Middle Grade Book	Daniel Miyares	How to Say Goodbye In Cuban	Finalist
2026	Middle Grade Book	Karina Yan Glaser	The Nine Moons of Han Yu and Luli	Finalist
2026	Middle Grade Book	James Robinson	Whale Eyes	Finalist
2026	Mystery	Sherry Thomas	The Librarians	Won
2026	Mystery	Laura Lippman	Murder Takes a Vacation	Honor
2026	Mystery	Uzma Jalaluddin	Detective Aunty	Finalist
2026	Mystery	Susie Dent	Guilty by Definition	Finalist
2026	Mystery	Vanessa Lillie	The Bone Thief	Finalist
2026	Personal Improvement	Glennon Doyle, Abby Wambach, and Amanda Doyle	We Can Do Hard Things	Won
2026	Personal Improvement	Ethan Kross	Shift: Managing Your Emotions—So They Don’t Manage You	Honor
2026	Personal Improvement	Rose Han	Add a Zero: A Step-by-Step Guide to Financial Freedom and Getting to Your First Million	Finalist
2026	Personal Improvement	Maggie Smith	Dear Writer: Pep Talks & Practical Advice for the Creative Life	Finalist
2026	Personal Improvement	Will Packer	Who Better Than You?: The Art of Healthy Arrogance & Dreaming Big	Finalist
2026	Picture Book	Neil Sharpson, illustrated by Dan Santat	Don't Trust Fish	Won
2026	Picture Book	Corey R. Tabor	Cranky, Crabby Crow (Saves the World)	Honor
2026	Picture Book	James Ransome	A Place for Us	Finalist
2026	Picture Book	Jashar Awan	Every Monday Mabel	Finalist
2026	Picture Book	Shawn Harris	Let’s Be Bees	Finalist
2026	Romance	Sarah MacLean	These Summer Storms	Won
2026	Romance	Adib Khorram	It Had to Be Him	Honor
2026	Romance	Regina Black	August Lane	Finalist
2026	Romance	TJ Alexander	A Gentleman’s Gentleman	Finalist
2026	Romance	Iman Hariri-Kia	Female Fantasy	Finalist
2026	Romantasy	Rebecca Yarros	Onyx Storm	Won
2026	Romantasy	Rachel Gillig	The Knight and the Moth	Honor
2026	Romantasy	Devney Perry	Shield of Sparrows	Finalist
2026	Romantasy	Akwaeke Emezi	Son of the Morning	Finalist
2026	Romantasy	Tasha Suri	The Isle in the Silver Sea	Finalist
2026	Science Fiction	Nnedi Okorafor	Death of the Author	Won
2026	Science Fiction	Ian McEwan	What We Can Know	Honor
2026	Science Fiction	Ken Liu	All That We See or Seem	Finalist
2026	Science Fiction	Yume Kitasei	Saltcrop	Finalist
2026	Science Fiction	Claire North	Slow Gods	Finalist
2026	Thriller	Liann Zhang	Julie Chan Is Dead	Won
2026	Thriller	Julie Clark	The Ghostwriter	Honor
2026	Thriller	Jennifer Givhan	Salt Bones	Finalist
2026	Thriller	Chris Pavone	The Doorman	Finalist
2026	Thriller	Alafair Burke	The Note	Finalist
2026	Readers’ Choice Award	Emily Henry	Great Big Beautiful Life	Won
2026	Readers’ Choice Award	Rebecca Yarros	Onyx Storm	Honor
2026	Readers’ Choice Award	Callie Hart	Brimstone	Finalist
2026	Readers’ Choice Award	Freida McFadden	The Crash	Finalist
2026	Readers’ Choice Award	Jeneva Rose	The Perfect Divorce	Finalist
