= The Ministry of Time =

The Ministry of Time may refer to:

- The Ministry of Time (novel), a 2024 novel by Kaliane Bradley
- El ministerio del tiempo, a 2015 Spanish television series, the title of which translates to The Ministry of Time
