= Julie Chan Is Dead =

2025 novel by Liann Zhang

Julie Chan is Dead
- Author: Liann Zhang
- Language: English
- Genre: Fiction
- Published: April 29, 2025
- Publisher: Atria Books
- Pages: 320 pp.
- ISBN: 978-1668067895

Julie Chan Is Dead is a 2025 satirical thriller novel written by Liann Zhang. The book has been described as a satire of social media influencer culture. Zhang was inspired to write the book based on her own experience as a skincare influencer as a teenager.

== Plot ==
Julie Chan and her identical twin, Chloe van Huusen, were separated as toddlers after their parents were killed in a car accident. While Julie went to live in poverty with their abusive Cantonese aunt, Chloe was adopted by a wealthy white couple in New York City, the Van Huusens. By their 20s, Julie is working a low-paying job in a grocery store while Chloe has become a successful social media influencer. The two do not interact, until Chloe surprises Julie and films an exploitative charity video in which she buys a house for Julie - growing Julie's resentment for her sister.

Years later, Julie receives an unexpected call from Chloe in which Chloe seems to be in distress. Julie travels to Chloe's New York City penthouse apartment to check on her, and finds Chloe dead. When the cops arrive at the apartment, they mistake Julie for Chloe and vice versa; Julie does not correct them and subsequently adopts Chloe's identity and life. Chloe's death is deemed a drug overdose.

With the assistance of Chloe's unsuspecting assistant, Fiona, Julie takes over Chloe's account and posts a viral video in which 'Chloe' mourns the overdose-induced death of her twin. Julie studies Chloe's digital footprint and attends various influencer events pretending to be her twin sister, including a high-profile runway show banquet hosted by Bella Marie Melniburg, a world-famous influencer. Julie discovers that Chloe's adoptive parents are brain-dead in a care facility after a car accident. Julie's aunt accuses her of stealing Chloe's identity, and blackmails Julie.

Months later, Julie (as Chloe) is invited to join Bella Marie and eight other influencers, called the Belladonnas, on an annual weeklong all-expenses-paid digital detox trip to a private island in the Caribbean owned by the Melniburgs - a trip which Chloe attended for multiple years. The trip begins normally, yet quickly escalates. Julie realizes the Belladonnas know that she is Julie, not Chloe, and that Bella Marie is drugging them each day. She also realizes one of the staff on the island, Viktor, is a sex slave. Bella Marie ultimately reveals that the Belladonnas are a sacrificial cult worshipping a deity they call Eto in order to achieve fame, that Chloe had sacrificed her adoptive parents to Eto, and that Bella Marie killed Chloe to stop her from going to the press about the Belladonnas. After completing the cult initiation ceremony and promising to sacrifice the Belladonnas to Eto, Julie brutally kills Bella Marie with an axe, before lighting on fire a cabana containing the other Belladonnas and killing them all.

Julie is arrested for murdering the Belladonnas and impersonating her dead sister, and becomes the face of a high-profile case. With the help of Viktor's testimony about the abusive Melniburg cult, Julie is ultimately acquitted and becomes an antiheroine.

== Critical reception ==
Reviews, including from Pique Newsmagazine, the Harvard Crimson, and Buzz Magazine, praised the novel for its dark humor, exploration of contemporary womanhood, and critique of modern social media and fame. Publishers Weekly applauded the "audacity" of the novel's unexpected ending. Julie Chan Is Dead has been compared favorably to Yellowface and Bunny.

The novel was included in an NPR list of the best fiction of 2025, and on CBC's 2025 list of 28 books by Canadian authors to read during Asian Heritage Month. Oprah Daily listed it as one of seven 'books that feel like a movie' in 2026.

=== Awards and honours ===
Year	Award	Category	Result	Ref.
2026	Libby Book Awards	Thriller	Won	
2026	Barry Award	First Novel	Pending	
2026	Trillium Book Award	English-language Prose	Pending	
