= Heather Fawcett =

Canadian writer of fiction

- Occupation: writer
- Years active: 2017–present
- Notable work: The School Between Winter and Fairyland (2021); Emily Wilde series (2023-present); The Grace of Wild Things (2023)
- Website: heatherfawcett.com

Heather Fawcett is a writer of middle grade, young adult, and adult fiction, based on Vancouver Island, British Columbia. She is best known for her adult cozy fantasy and romantasy novel, Emily Wilde's Encyclopaedia of Faeries.

== Biography ==
Fawcett has an undergraduate degree in archaeology and a master's in English. Before writing full time, she had worked as an archaeologist, photographer, technical writer, and in theater.

She maintains a Substack where she writes about books she's read and her creative process.

== Career ==
Fawcett's first published works were for middle grade readers, starting with Even the Darkest Stars, the first in a duology, in 2017. In 2023 she released The Grace of Wild Things, a character-driven fantasy retelling of Anne of Green Gables.

Her adult debut, Emily Wilde's Encyclopaedia of Faeries, raised her profile, and was nominated in the Locus Awards and the Mythopoeic Awards. It was written as both the beginning of a series and a standalone novel, with further books dependent on reception. She has since released two additional books in the series, Emily Wilde's Map of the Otherlands and Emily Wilde's Compendium of Lost Tales, and a fourth and fifth are planned. The series was nominated in the 2026 Hugo Awards.

The novels are written in an epistolary format, primarily from the perspective of Emily Wilde, a professor at the University of Cambridge who studies the fae. The setting is an alternate history Edwardian era, where women have been admitted to university study and some, like Emily, have earned professorships.

In 2024, she signed a deal with Del Ray for the adult fantasy Agnes Aubert's Mystical Cat Shelter and two additional books. The idea for Agnes originated before Emily Wilde, but Fawcett has said that it didn't fully mature until she read an article about Montreal and its population of street cats.

== Published works ==
=== Short stories ===
- "The Fairy Gaol", Beneath Ceaselesss Skies, 2011
- "A Labyrinth of Honeybees", forthcoming, July 28, 2026

=== Young adult fiction ===
==== Even the Darkest Stars (2017) ====
Published by Storytide, an imprint of Harper Collins.

- Even the Darkest Stars, 2017
- All the Wandering Light, 2018

==== Standalone ====
- Wondrous, Random House/Disney, October 2026

=== Middle grade ===
- Ember and the Ice Dragons, Balzer & Bray, 2019
- The Language of Ghosts, Balzer & Bray, 2020
- The School Between Winter and Fairyland, Balzer & Bray, 2021
- The Grace of Wild Things, Balzer & Bray, 2023
- The Islands of Elsewhere, Rocky Pond Books, 2023
- A Galaxy of Whales, Rocky Pond Books, 2024

=== Adult ===
==== Emily Wilde (2023) ====
Published by Del Ray.

- Emily Wilde's Encyclopaedia of Faeries, 2023
- Emily Wilde's Map of the Otherlands, 2024
- Emily Wilde's Compendium of Lost Tales, 2025
- Emily Wilde's History of Dark Faerie, forthcoming, January 2027

==== Standalone ====
- Agnes Aubert's Mystical Cat Shelter, Del Ray, 2026

== Reception ==
Fawcett's middle grade works have been well received by reviewers, who highlight her depiction of familial relationships as well as deeper cultural concerns such as environmentalism and diversity. The Nerd Daily reviewed The Language of Ghosts, calling it "[h]eartfelt, sweet, and action-packed". Noting that it began slowly, they overall found it an appealing read for both middle-grade and adult readers. In a starred review, Kirkus called The Grace of Wild Things "magical, witchy, and thoroughly successful homage to a classic."

Her adult fiction has also been well received. Kirkus called Emily Wilde's Encyclopaedia of Faeries "somewhat uneven" but recommended it for fans of cozy fantasy. Publishers Weekly described the novel as "slow-moving but atmospheric", complimenting its "extensive faerie lore and lush descriptions of the wintry setting". BookPage described the novel's world as "cozy and threatening, allowing her to explore sentimental themes without being maudlin and delve into dark and deadly magic without dwelling for too long on its horrors".

Agnes Aubert's Mystical Cat Shelter was generally positively reviewed, though Kirkus was more critical, calling the worldbuilding and plotting "a bit sloppy", but complimented Fawcett for her understanding of "the complicated but rewarding relationship between humans and cats." Library Journal named the novel its Pick of the Month, praising its slow-burn romance and saying, "[t]he cats are charmingly underfoot every step of the way, and the magic is destructive and seductive."

=== Awards ===
Year	Work	Award	Category	Result	Ref
2019	Even the Darkest Stars	Manitoba Young Readers' Choice Awards	Northern Lights	Nominated	
2021	Ember and the Ice Dragons	Silver Birch Awards	Fiction	Nominated	
2021	Ember and the Ice Dragons	Manitoba Young Readers' Choice Awards	Sundogs	Nominated	
2022	The School Between Winter and Fairyland	Ontario Arts Council	Children's Book	Shortlisted	
2022	The School Between Winter and Fairyland	Ruth & Sylvia Schwartz Children's Book Awards	Young Adult/Middle Grade	Nominated	
2022	The Language of Ghosts	Manitoba Young Readers' Choice Awards	Sundogs	Nominated	
2022	The Language of Ghosts	Silver Birch Awards	Fiction	Nominated	
2023	Emily Wilde's Encyclopaedia of Faeries	Goodreads Choice Awards	Favorite Fantasy	Nominated—4th	
2023	Emily Wilde's Encyclopaedia of Faeries	Libby Book Award	Best Romantasy	Won	
2023	The School Between Winter and Fairyland	Manitoba Young Readers' Choice Awards	Sundogs	Nominated	
2023	The School Between Winter and Fairyland	Rocky Mountain Book Awards	Fiction	Nominated	
2023	The Grace of Wild Things	Cybils Award	EMG Speculative Fiction	Won	
2024	Emily Wilde's Encyclopaedia of Faeries	Locus Award	Fantasy Novel	Nominated	
2024	Emily Wilde's Encyclopaedia of Faeries	Mythopoeic Awards	Adult Literature	Nominated	
2024	Emily Wilde's Map of the Otherlands	Goodreads Choice Awards	Favorite Fantasy	Nominated—3rd	
2025	Emily Wilde's Compendium of Lost Tales	Goodreads Choice Awards	Favorite Romantasy	Nominated—8th	
2025	The Islands of Elsewhere	Manitoba Young Readers' Choice Awards	Sundogs	Nominated	
2025	The Grace of Wild Things	Vermont Golden Dome Book Award	-	Nominated	
2026	Emily Wilde	Hugo Awards	Best Series	Finalist	
2026	Emily Wilde's Compendium of Lost Tales	Aurora Awards	Novel	Nominated	
