= Ana Reyes =

American writer

- Education: Louisiana State University (MFA)
- Occupations: Writer, professor
- Notable work: The House in the Pines

Ana Reyes is an American writer and professor. Her debut novel, The House in the Pines, published by Dutton Books in 2023, was a New York Times Best Seller and selected as a Reese's Book Club pick and Costco Buyer's Pick.

== Early life and education ==
Reyes grew up in Texas but moved, at the age of 11 to Massachusetts, where her maternal grandparents were at the time. She spent two and a half years there and attended Sacred Heart Elementary School and Stearns Elementary School.

Around then, Reyes wrote her first short story for a writing contest hosted by a library in Pittsfield. The short story didn't win, but the cabin depicted in it would later be a central image in her debut novel, written in her thirties.

Reyes holds a Master of Fine Arts degree from Louisiana State University. There, she worked on a thesis that would later become The House in the Pines. Moving to Los Angeles afterward, she participated in a workshop at Santa Monica College taught by Jim Krusoe, where she worked on her debut novel even further.

== Career ==
As an adjunct professor, Reyes taught a memoir class for older adults at Santa Monica College's Emeritus Program. She has also taught at Occidental College and California State University, Dominguez Hills.

Reyes work has appeared in magazines like New Delta Review, Bodega Magazine, Pear Noir, CrimeReads, and others. In 2023, Reyes released her debut novel, The House in the Pines. The book took seven years to complete, starting in 2015. Currently, she is working on a second novel that is "even creepier than The House in the Pines."

== Personal life ==
Reyes is half Guatemalan. Her paternal grandparents and father, all of whom grew up in Guatemala, left the country while her father was 11 due to regional instability precipitated by American interference. Her mother and maternal grandfather grew up in Pittsfield.
