= Saltcrop =

2025 climate fiction novel

- Author: Yume Kitasei
- Audio read by: Eunice Wong
- Cover artist: Jonathan Bush
- Genre: Climate fiction
- Publisher: Flatiron Books
- Publication date: 09/30/2025
- Pages: 384
- ISBN: 9781250380968

Saltcrop is a 2025 climate fiction novel by Yume Kitasei set in a near-future where a blight threatens most agriculture.

== Development ==
Kitasei grew up visiting Rhode Island to sail, and she wanted to write a novel to capture the feeling of being out on the sea.

Saltcrop is written in present tense. There are also two point of view switches, resulting in the book being narrated by each of the three sisters.

== Plot ==
Author Yume Kitasei promoting Saltcrop at the 2025 Texas Book Festival in Austin, Texas.

=== Skipper's POV ===
Skipper and Carmen live in a near-future world where food is scarce and wealth inequality is increasing. Their eldest sister, Nora, lives in the city and visits only rarely. When she fails to come home one day, the sisters begin to worry. Skipper fishes for mussels on her ship, the Bumblebee, and decides to take it north to the city to find Nora. Carmen reluctantly comes along, feeling responsible for her younger sister.

Upon arriving in the city, they find Nora's apartment empty. A coworker of Nora's believes she went to work for another corporation, farther north, in the hopes of finding a seed that is resistant to the blight prevalent in their world. Skipper and Carmen continue traveling north and meet Jackson, who offers to help them in their search for Nora. They receive a coded message on the Bumblebee from Nora that Skipper interprets as a message for help.

The voyage to the vault, Nora's holding place, takes over two weeks. During the trip, Carmen and Jackson strike up a romantic relationship. The trio try to stop at land for refueling but come across a cannibalistic society that attempts to eat them; they survive due to Jackson's guns and willingness to kill them all. Skipper disagrees with this approach. As the voyage continues, Jackson's temper gets the better of him multiple times, and the two sisters are eventually forced to throw him overboard after a particularly heated fight.

=== Carmen's POV ===
Skipper and Carmen arrive at Renewal's Vault City. They both are assigned jobs, and Carmen begins to work in the clinic as a nurse. They meet a cast of characters that claim to know where Nora is, who is going by the alias "Aurora," their mother's name. Carmen steals medicines for one of the informants in an attempt to learn more about Nora, but the situation remains uncertain. Finally, Carmen is able to sneak into the vault after meeting a patient in the clinic who recognizes her as Nora's sister. To her surprise, Nora has already escaped and fled. Carmen and Skipper embark on another trip to find their sister.

=== Nora's POV ===
Nora is living in an idyllic country with her adopted teenage daughter. She is actively working on creating a cure for the blight, using the blight-resistant seeds that she found while in the vault at Renewal. Skipper and Carmen are angry at Nora for not being more honest with them about her whereabouts and plans. Reluctantly, Nora reveals that Renewal has not only been making the cure for blight, but also causing the blights, in order to boost business. Nora survived multiple attempts on her life before she escaped the company. Satisfied, Carmen returns home to be with their sick grandmother, and Skipper remains with Nora in the new country.

== Characters ==
- Rosa "Skipper" Shimizu, the naive youngest sister with a love of sailing
- Carmen Shimizu, the responsible middle child who works as a nurse
- Nora Shimizu, the eldest, she works for a corporation in the city
- Grandma, the guardian of the three sisters before she got sick
- Jackson, a man Skipper and Carmen meet on their quest to find Nora who offers to help them

== Reception ==
Saltcrop received starred reviews from Publishers Weekly, Kirkus Reviews, Library Journal, and Shelf Awareness.

In a review for Locus, Niall Harrison praised Saltcrop's dream-like feel, particularly how Kitasei did not explicitly name any modern-day countries or locations of the characters. Harrison described the book as a "fable of the future."

When reviewing for Ancillary Review of Books, Noah Micah criticized how Nora's vague messages and miscommunication between the characters, stating one instance "just feels cartoonish" but described the book overall as "a wonderfully conceptualized climate change disaster story that utilizes its setting and well-written characters."

It was nominated for a 2026 Libby Award and the 2025 Goodreads Readers Choice Awards.
