= Louder Than Hunger =

2024 novel by John Schu

- Author: John Schu
- Publisher: Candlewick Press
- Publication date: March 19, 2024
- ISBN: 978-1536229097

Louder Than Hunger is a 2024 middle grade verse novel by John Schu. Inspired by Schu's own experiences, it follows a teenage boy recovering from anorexia in the 1990s.

== Plot ==
Jake Stacey, a thirteen-year-old boy growing up in 1996, has a "Voice" in his head that constantly criticizes him. Despite his loving family, the severe bullying he faces at school and his grandmother's cancer diagnosis take a toll on him, and the Voice convinces him to restrict his diet and eventually stop eating altogether. His concerned family has him involuntarily enrolled into Whispering Pines, an inpatient treatment facility, where he begins a long and difficult recovery.

== Development ==
Louder Than Hunger was based on Schu’s own experiences with anorexia and mental illness as a teenage.

== Reception ==
Kirkus Reviews praised the uncertain but hopeful ending as "honest and notable." However, they argued the plot dragged at certain parts and the supporting cast was undeveloped. They concluded that the book was a "true-to-life narrative that is respectfully and indelibly portrayed."

Publishers Weekly and School Library Journal both gave Louder Than Hunger starred reviews. Publishers Weekly described the book as an "unflinching depiction of resistance and disordered eating recovery" and noted the "clever use of negative space and onomatopoeic phrases," while Juliet Morefield of School Library Journal commented on the "much-needed and underrepresented male perspective on eating disorders."

The book was also reviewed in The New York Times, which similarly noted that it was a rare example of a story about eating disorders with a male protagonist.

=== Accolades ===
Year	Award/honor	Result	Reference
2025	Schneider Family Book Award - Middle Grade	Honored	
2025	Libby Book Award - Middle Grade Book	Shortlisted	
2025	Audie Award for Middle Grade Title	Shortlisted	
2024	Cybils Award - Novel In Verse	Shortlisted	
