= In Mike We Trust =

2009 book by P. E. Ryan

- Cover illustration of In Mike We Trust by P.E. Ryan
- Author: P. E. Ryan
- Language: English
- Genre: Young adult novel
- Publisher: HarperTeen
- Publication date: 2009
- Publication place: United States
- Media type: Print (hardback)
- Pages: 321
- ISBN: 0-06-085813-3

In Mike We Trust is a young adult gay novel by P. E. Ryan first published in 2009. It depicts a teenage gay boy who falls under the sway of his con artist uncle (who is the twin brother of the boy's recently deceased father). The boy struggles with his sexual orientation as well as the need for honesty when his beloved role model asks him to lie.

The book was a Lambda Literary Award finalist for LGBT Children's/Young Adult literature, and was named by Booklist to its Rainbow List 2010 (bibliography of young adult books which include significant gay, lesbian, bisexual, transgender, or questioning content). This is the second young adult novel focusing on LGBTQ teens by author P. E. Ryan, whose first effort in the genre was 2008's Saints of Augustine. As Patrick Ryan, he wrote Send Me, a novel for adults.

== Plot synopsis ==
The book is written in the first person singular from the perspective of its 15-year-old narrator, Garth Rudd.

The Rudds live in Richmond, Virginia. Garth's father died in a boating accident two years earlier, leaving his middle-class family to shoulder his many debts. Now living on the edge of poverty, Garth's mother, Sonja, works two jobs to support the family and Garth tries to earn spending money and save for college by working as a janitor of sorts at a downtown department store for a condescending supervisor. Wanting to be a veterinarian when he is older, Garth volunteers at a local animal shelter caring for dogs and cats. Garth has repeated nightmares about his father's death, and is unhappy about his short height (he is only 5 feet 2 inches (1.57 m) tall). Prior to the novel's opening (although this scene is related in flashback), Garth came out to his best friend, Lisa, about his homosexuality. Shortly thereafter, Garth (in flashback) tells his mother that he is gay. But his mother, worried that her short, slight teenage son might be gay bashed, tells Garth not to tell anyone else that he is gay.

The novel opens when Mike Rudd, the twin brother of Garth's deceased father, arrives at the Rudd home. Mrs. Rudd and Lisa are somewhat cold and distant toward Mike, but Mike and Garth immediately become friends. Mike also realizes Garth is gay, and on a shopping trip Mike takes Garth into a gay bookstore. Garth meets an openly gay classmate, Adam Walters, in the store, and Mike arranges for Garth and Mike to watch a DVD of the motion picture Beautiful Thing together at the Rudd house. A short time later, Mike convinces Garth to go with him on a trip to a shopping mall in a suburb of Richmond where he intends to solicit donations to fight the disease "meninosis." Garth quickly realizes that "meninosis" is not a real disease, but the presence of the boyish-looking Garth helps Mike raise hundreds of dollars in donations. Mike promises to give Garth a cut of the money, and Garth quits his job. Garth begins to feel guilty over the large number of lies he tells his mother and Lisa to cover up both what he is doing with Mike and his relationship with Adam. Garth justifies his actions by assuring himself that the money he is getting will go into his college fund and make his mother worry less, and that his mother's demand that he remain closeted is unjust.

Mike's cons become more elaborate. He successfully convinces Garth to wear an old Scooby-Doo Halloween costume (which still fits, because Garth has not grown much taller in the past several years). He also successfully gets Garth to take two dogs from the animal shelter as well as his own elderly dog, Hutch, with them on a fundraising trip. They pretend to be raising money for a disease which strikes dogs. Adam and Garth watch the movie Chinatown together, and kiss. Shortly thereafter, Mike takes Garth to a run-down section of Richmond where Mike recruits a beautiful blonde woman and a bar patron to help with his latest scam. Mike rents a sports car and pretends to raffle off the vehicle at the Virginia State Fair. Adam, also visiting the fair, sees Garth with his uncle. When the scam goes wrong, Mike, Garth, and the beautiful woman are forced to flee the scene. Upset that she was duped to participate in a con, the woman sends her boyfriend to the Rudd house to confront Mike. Mike escapes the house, leaving Garth to defend himself against the angry man. Garth's mother witnesses the confrontation, and Garth is forced to tell the truth about what he and Mike have been doing.

The novel concludes with Garth having to own up to his actions and resolve his conflicts with his mother. Garth must also come to terms with his Uncle Mike's cowardice and lies, and struggles to repair his friendships with Lisa and Adam.

The novel contains a number of references to non-fiction people, things, and places, like the singer Sufjan Stevens, the films Beautiful Thing and Chinatown, the cartoon characters Scooby-Doo and Superman, and to places in and around Richmond, Virginia. It also mentions the Richmond Organization for Sexual Minority Youth (ROSMY), a real organization which offers support and leadership for LGBTQ youth in the Richmond area.

== Critical reception ==
The reviewer in the Bulletin of the Center for Children's Books was highly laudatory, noting that "Garth's relationship with Mike is the perfect catalyst for his coming of age: it allows him to put aside his childish expectations about ideal relationships in favor of an understanding of adults as complex, flawed people. [Details in the book] become symbols for the various aspects of hiding, immaturity, fear, compromise, and insight that accompany Garth's circuitous route to maturity with honor, making this a rich and offbeat novel about a young man coming into his own both because of and in spite of his family." A School Library Journal reviewer also had positive things to say about the book, writing, "With overlying themes of honesty and truth, In Mike We Trust features vivid characters dancing around a number of issues."
