= New York City Department of Citywide Administrative Services =

New York City government agency

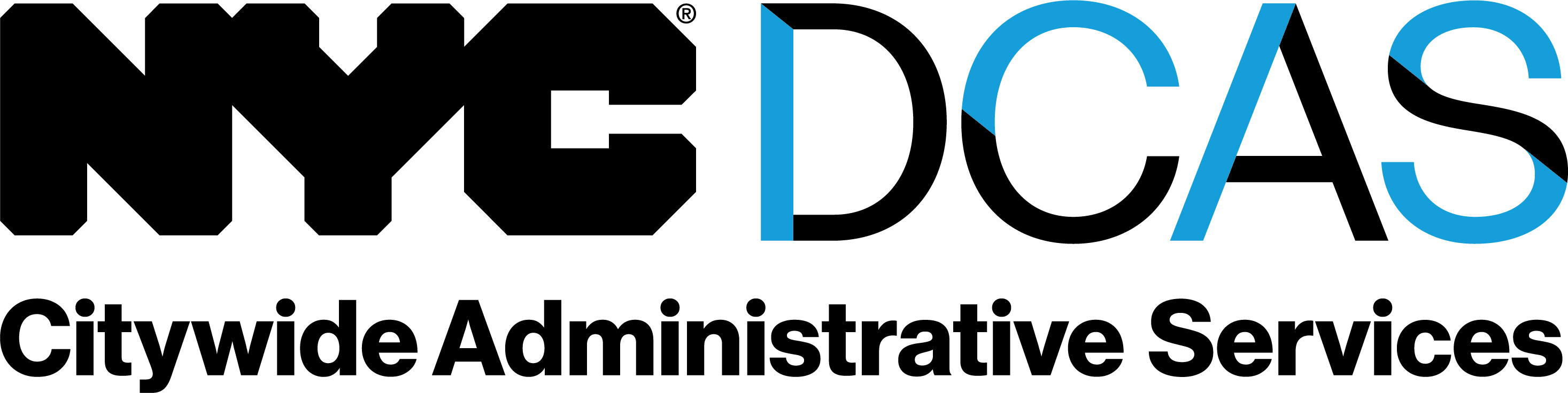

Department overview
- Formed: 1996; 30 years ago
- Preceding agencies: NYC Department of General Services; NYC Department of Personnel
- Jurisdiction: New York City
- Headquarters: Manhattan Municipal Building One Centre Street, 17th Floor South New York, NY 10007
- Employees: 2,455 (FY 2026)
- Annual budget: $1.82 billion (FY 2026)
- Department executives: Yume Kitasei, Commissioner; Shanna Midelton, First Deputy Commissioner; Shameka Overton, Executive Deputy Commissioner; Laura Ringelheim, Executive Deputy Commissioner
- Key document: New York City Charter
- Website: nyc.gov/dcas

The New York City Department of Citywide Administrative Services (DCAS) is a department of the New York City government tasked with recruiting, hiring, and training City employees, managing 56 public buildings, acquiring, selling, and leasing City property, purchasing over $1 billion in goods and services for City agencies, overseeing the greenest municipal vehicle fleet in the country, and leading the City's efforts to reduce carbon emissions from government operations among other things.

== History ==
The New York City Department of Citywide Administrative Services was created in 1996 when Mayor Rudolph W. Giuliani merged the Department of General Services and the Department of Personnel. The Department of Citywide Administrative Services Law Enforcement Special Officers was started in 1996 with approximately 10 special officers assigned to various DCAS facilities.

== Organization and Structure ==
The department is administered and governed by the commissioner, who is appointed by the mayor. The Commissioner once appointed, reports to the Deputy Mayor of Operations. The commissioner in turn appoints and oversees executive deputy commissioners who supervise the deputy commissioners for each line of service. DCAS is organized across 13 lines of service:

- Administration
- Citywide Equity and Inclusion
- Citywide Procurement
- Construction and Technical Services
- Energy Management
- Facilities Management
- Fiscal and Business Management
- Fleet Management
- General Counsel
- Human Capital
- Information Technology
- Public Affairs
- Real Estate Services

== Commissioners ==
Chapter 35, section 810 of the New York City Charter states "There shall be a department of citywide administrative services, the head of which shall be the commissioner of citywide administrative services."

Name	Dates in Office	Mayoral Administration	Notes and References
William J. Diamond	August 10, 1996 – December 31, 2001	Rudolph W. Giuliani	
Martha K. Hirst	January 1, 2002 – by January 2011	Michael R. Bloomberg	
Edna Wells Handy	by January 2011 – by January 2014	Michael R. Bloomberg	
Stacey Cumberbatch	January 24, 2014 – by January 2016	Bill de Blasio	
Lisette Camilo	January 5, 2016 – November 12, 2021	Bill de Blasio	
Dawn M. Pinnock	November 13, 2021 – June 30, 2024	Bill de Blasio; Eric Adams	
Louis A. Molina	July 1, 2024 – December 31, 2025	Eric Adams	
Yume Kitasei	2026	Zohran Mamdani	

== Public safety ==
New York City Department of Citywide Administrative Services Police
- New York City Department of Citywide Administrative Services Police Patch
- Common name: New York City DCAS Police Department
- Abbreviation: DCASPD

Jurisdictional structure
- General nature: Local civilian police
- Specialist jurisdiction: Buildings and lands occupied or explicitly controlled by the institution and the institution's personnel, and public entering the buildings and precincts of the institution

Operational structure
- Special Officers: 70

Facilities
- Commands: List: Manhattan Command – 1 Centre St, New York; Brooklyn Command – Brooklyn Borough Hall, Brooklyn; Staten Island Command – Staten Island Borough Hall, Staten Island; Bronx Command – Arthur Avenue, Bronx; Queens Command – Queens Borough Hall, Queens

Website
- DCAS Police Official Website

This agency employs Special Officers who have very limited peace officer authority in connection with their assignment of employment pursuant to New York State Criminal Procedure Law, Article 2, §2.10, ss 27. and DCAS policies. The exercise of this authority is very limited to the employee's geographical area of employment and only while such employee is actually working as listed in Chapter 13 subsection (C).. a few Special Officers are licensed by the New York City Police Department to carry a firearm while performing their assignment only. They conduct preliminary investigations, building rule violations, security breaches, and thefts of property on DCAS facilities. DCAS special Officers develop and implement corrective and preventive measures. They assist in operational and emergency planning in partnership with other DCAS Lines of Service and other emergency response agencies during emergency conditions. DCAS special officers manage and administer the contract guard agreement to ensure necessary staffing levels and compliance with the contract provisions on DCAS managed properties..

The New York City Police Department is the primary policing and investigation agency within New York City as per the NYC Charter, They respond to all incidents that occur at NYC DCAS facilities.

== See also ==
- New York State Department of Civil Service
- Law enforcement in New York City
