= The House in the Pines =

2023 debut novel by Ana Reyes

- Author: Ana Reyes
- Genre: Thriller
- Publisher: Dutton Books
- Publication date: January 3, 2023
- Pages: 336
- ISBN: 978-0593186718

The House in the Pines is a 2023 debut novel by American writer Ana Reyes. It spent nine weeks on the New York Times Best Seller list and was selected as a Reese's Book Club pick and Costco Buyer's Pick.

== Background ==
At the age of 11, Reyes wrote a short story about a cabin for a writing contest hosted by a library in Pittsfield, Massachusetts. At the time, she had been inspired by authors like Christopher Pike and R. L. Stine. The short story didn't win, but the cabin would later be central to the book when she began writing it as an adult in her thirties.

Reyes took seven years to write the book and worked on it as her Master of Fine Arts thesis at Louisiana State University. Afterward, she rewrote it twice. She also attended a workshop led by Jim Krusoe at Santa Monica College to workshop several parts of it.

Reyes based parts of the book on her own experience. Maya, like Reyes, is half Guatemalan. The plot about Maya's father, set in Guatemala, was derived from her own experience learning about the Guatemalan genocide from her own father.

== Critical reception ==
The book was selected as the first Reese's Book Club Pick of 2023. Reese Witherspoon called an "absolute, can't-put-it-down thriller."

Booktrib called the book "a fresh, impressive launch for Reyes which is already receiving rave reviews" and one that "keeps you guessing about whether we can ever fully confront the past and return home."

== Adaptation ==
Gato Grande Productions, of Amazon MGM Studios, optioned the rights to the book for television in 2023, months before its paperback release.
