= One Dark Window =

2022 fantasy novel by Rachel Gillig

- First edition paperback cover
- Author: Rachel Gillig
- Cover artist: Lisa Marie Pompilio
- Language: English
- Genre: Romantic fantasy, gothic fiction
- Publisher: Orbit Books
- Publication date: September 27, 2022
- Publication place: United States
- Pages: 432
- ISBN: 9780316312585
- Followed by: Two Twisted Crowns

One Dark Window is a gothic romantic fantasy novel by American author Rachel Gillig. It was published by Orbit Books on September 27, 2022. It is Gillig's debut novel and the first book in the Shepherd King duology.

An unabridged audiobook narrated by Lisa Cordileone was released alongside the ebook and paperback editions.

== Background ==
When Gillig was drafting the novel, she got infected with COVID-19. She had to take a break from writing for a month due to brain fog caused by the infection.

== Synopsis ==
Elspeth Spindle has spent her life hiding her "infection" from the world at large. Infected children often manifest the ability to absorb power from the Providence Cards, twelve playing cards used to perform specific kinds of magic, and are put to death in the king's dungeons. Touching one card has led to a five-hundred-year-old spirit named Nightmare to take residence in Elspeth's mind and frequently control her body, growing stronger as Elspeth's health declines. After Nightmare helps her fight off a highwayman searching for her uncle's Providence Cards, the highwayman reveals himself to be the king's nephew, Ravyn Yew. Elspeth and Ravyn must collect all twelve cards before the solstice to cure their kingdom of the dark magic infecting it, and before the king kills Ravyn's infected younger brother and Nightmare completely takes over her body.

== Reception ==
The novel became popular on BookTok six months after it was published.

Publishers Weekly praised the "steamy" romance between Elspeth and Ravyn, but criticized Nightmare's tendency for speaking in rhyming couplets as "inappropriately twee" and called the twist of Nightmare's true identity "entirely obvious". Archita Mittra of the Chicago Review of Books praised the novel's "evocative" prose and its "commendable" use of its magic system, but criticized its pacing, its "disappointing" cliffhanger ending, and its "predictable" romantic subplot that relies on tropes rather than genuine chemistry. Maxim M. Martineau of Reactor praised the novel's attention to the cost of magic.

== Sequel ==
A sequel titled Two Twisted Crowns was released in 2023. The two form the Shepherd King duology. It follows Elspeth and Ravyn as they attempt to gather the last of the Providence Cards known as the Twin Alders.
