= Kaliane Bradley =

English writer and editor

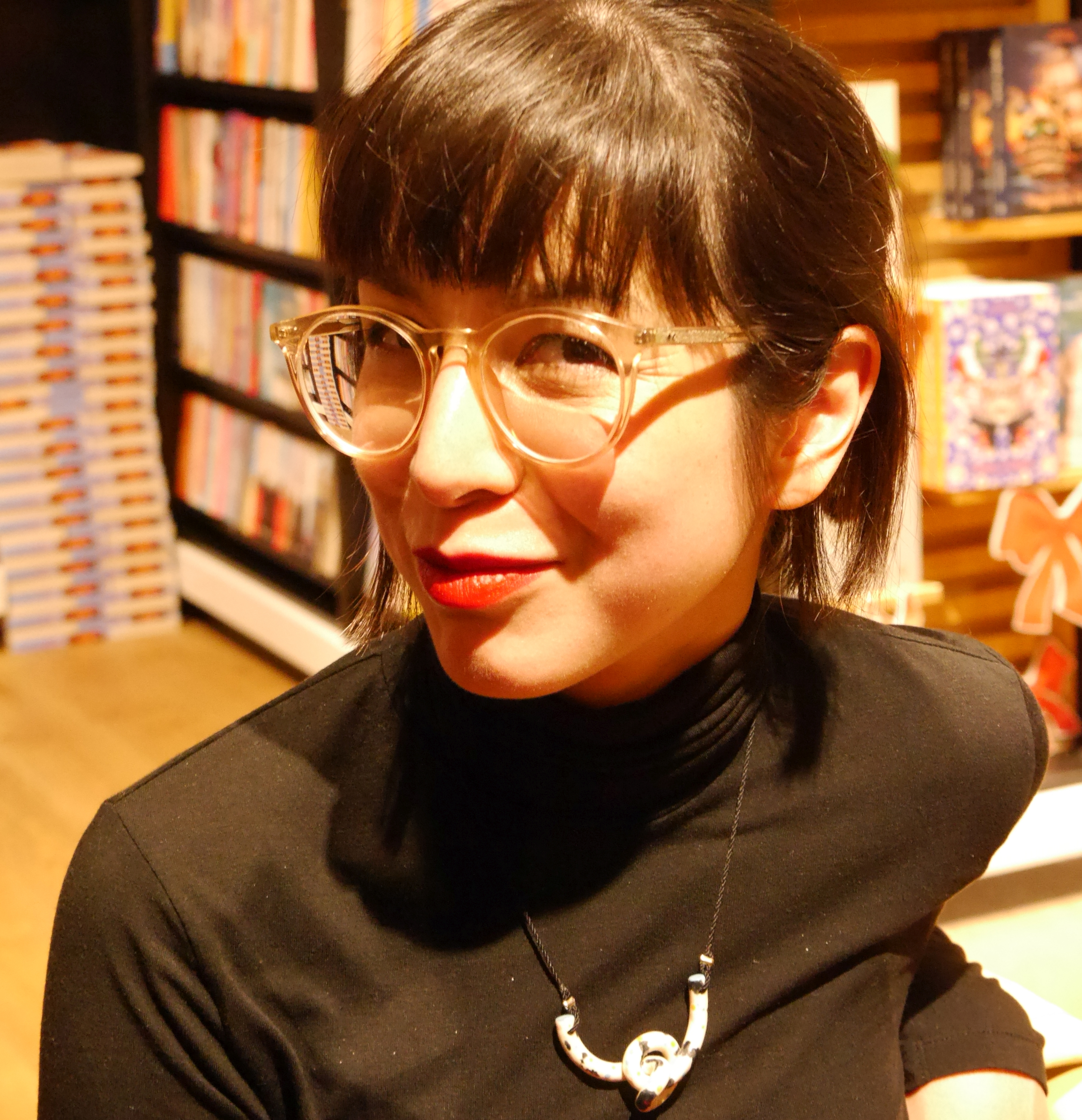
- Bradley at Waterstones, London in 2024
- Born: Kaliane Mong Huxham Bradley; 1989–1990; Walthamstow, London, England
- Other name: Ka Bradley
- Education: University College London
- Years active: 2012–present

Kaliane Bradley is an English writer and editor. Her debut novel The Ministry of Time (2024) received a number of accolades.

== Early life and education ==
Kaliane Mong Huxham Bradley was born in Walthamstow, East London, to a British father and a Cambodian Khmer mother. Bradley grew up in a small house with a maternal older half-brother and younger twin sisters. The family moved to Essex for more space when Bradley was 10.

Bradley attended a private secondary school. She graduated from University College London (UCL) with a degree in English literature.

== Career ==
In 2012, Bradley joined Granta magazine as an editorial assistant. She was later promoted to junior editor and commissioning editor, and worked for Granta's imprint Portobello. From 2016 to 2021, she wrote theatre and dance reviews and interviews for Exeunt Magazine, Time Out London, The Stage, and The Guardian.

Bradley won the 2022 Harper's Bazaar Short Story Competition for "Golden Years" and the VS Pritchett Short Story Prize for "Doggerland", the latter awarded by the Royal Society of Literature.

In 2023, Bradley secured a book deal with Sceptre Books, a Hodder & Stoughton imprint, in addition to translations in 13 territories and an adaptation auction between 21 production companies. Her debut novel The Ministry of Time, a time travel romance based around Franklin's lost expedition, was published in May 2024. Bradley had become inspired watching the AMC series The Terror during lockdown. Ahead of the novel's release, the BBC commissioned an adaptation penned by Alice Birch, as announced in February. The Ministry of Time was shortlisted for the Waterstones Debut Fiction Prize and the Bollinger Everyman Wodehouse Prize. Bradley was named one of the 10 best new novelists of 2024 by The Observer.

In April 2024, Bradley stated that she was working on her next novel, which would involve a retelling of Greek mythology with a neo-noir setting.

== Personal life ==
As of May 2024 Bradley was living in East London with her partner Sam, an academic. They intended to wed in summer 2024.

== Published works ==
=== Novels ===
- The Ministry of Time (2024)

=== Short stories and essays ===
- "A Manifesto of Gym Literature" in minor literature[s] (2015)
- "How to Inflate a Balloon" in Queen Mob's Tea House (2015)
- "Please Help, My Poem is Very Sick" in Queen Mob's Tea House (2015)
- "A Letter of Enquiry Regarding a Possible Purchase" in The Offing (2015)
- "Naming and its Discontents" in Awst Press (2016)
- "Gloomy Sundays" in Somesuch Stories
- "Wendy" in Granta (2016)
- "The Wall" in Somesuch Stories #2 (2017)
- "Virginia Street to Kendall" in Under the Influence #18 (2017)
- "Same-same but different" in Granta (2017)
- "First Refrain from Doing Harm" in Somesuch Stories
- "Bishop of the Bluebells" in The Willowherb Review (2019)
- "The Housemate" in Catapule (2020)
- "London Foxes: You Can't Vaccinate a City Animal for Rudeness" in Electric Literature #182 (2021)
- Work in Extra Teeth #4 (2021)
- "Doggerland" (2022)
- "Golden Years" (2022)

=== Edited collections ===
- On Anxiety: An Anthology (2018) (co-edited)

=== Edited translations ===
- Swallowing Mercury (2017) by Wioletta Greg, translated by Eliza Marciniak
- The Collection (2019) by Nina Leger, translated by Laura Francis

== Awards ==
Year	Title	Award	Category	Result	Ref.
2024	The Ministry of Time	Amazon Books Best Book of the Year	Fiction	Shortlisted	
2024	The Ministry of Time	Bollinger Everyman Wodehouse Prize	—	Shortlisted	
2024	The Ministry of Time	Dymocks Book of the Year	—	Won	
2024	The Ministry of Time	Goodreads Choice Awards	Science Fiction	Won	
2024	The Ministry of Time	Goodreads Choice Awards	Debut Novel	2nd	
2024	The Ministry of Time	Waterstones Debut Fiction Prize	—	Shortlisted	
2025	The Ministry of Time	Audie Award	Fiction	Finalist	
2025	The Ministry of Time	Australian Book Industry Awards	International Book	Shortlisted	
2025	The Ministry of Time	Authors' Club First Novel Award	—	Longlisted	
2025	The Ministry of Time	British Book Awards	Debut Fiction	Shortlisted	
2025	The Ministry of Time	Climate Fiction Prize	—	Shortlisted	
2025	The Ministry of Time	Jhalak Prize	Prose	Longlisted	
2025	The Ministry of Time	Libby Book Award	Science Fiction	Won	
2025	The Ministry of Time	Women's Prize for Fiction	—	Longlisted	
2025	The Ministry of Time	Hugo Awards	Hugo Award for Best Novel	Nominated	
