= Patrick Ryan (American author) =

American author (born 1965)

- Born: 1965 (age 60–61); Washington, D.C., U.S.
- Education: Florida State University; Bowling Green State University (MFA)
- Occupations: Short story writer, novelist
- Website: patrickryanbooks.com

Patrick Eugene Ryan (born 1965) is an American novelist and short story writer. His books include short stories collections Send Me (2006) and The Dream Life of Astronauts, as well as three novels for young adults: Saints of Augustine (2008), In Mike We Trust (2009), Gemini Bites (2011), and his latest novel for adults Buckeye (2025).

== Life and career ==
Patrick Ryan was born in Washington, D.C., in 1965 and raised in Florida. He received his bachelor's degree in 1987 from Florida State University and his Master of Fine Arts in 1990 from the Writing Program at Bowling Green State University.

He wrote short stories for about 10 years prior to the publication of his first book. His story "So Much for Artemis" earned him a National Endowment for the Arts in Fiction fellowship and was included in The Best American Short Stories 2006. His story "Getting Heavy With Fate" received the 2005 Smart Family Foundation Award for Fiction.

His first book was Send Me, a collection of linked short stories that looks at four decades in the life of a dysfunctional family. Celebrated author Edmund White compared Ryan's writing to that of John Cheever. The Bay Area Reporter called Send Me "a masterfully eventful novel..." while a reviewer at The Seattle Times said it was "a meticulously crafted, immensely satisfying piece of work."

Ryan followed up in 2008 with the young adult novel Saints of Augustine. Two best teenage friends, one gay and one not, struggle with family issues, drug abuse, divorce, dating, and a rupture in their friendship. In 2009, he published a second young adult novel, In Mike We Trust, which is about a young man's relationship with his con-artist uncle who attempts to lure him into a life of charity scams. His 2011 novel, Gemini Bites, follows a boy and girl who are fraternal twins and their competition for the affection of a goth boy who comes to live with their family for a short period of time.

The Dream Life of Astronauts was published in July 2016. It is a collection of nine short stories set during Florida's space program from the late 1960s to the present.

For four years, Ryan worked as an editor at the literary magazine Granta. He is the current editor-in-chief of One Story and One Teen Story.

Ryan published Buckeye, his first novel for adults, in 2025. It follows two couples in the fictional town of Bonhomie, Ohio from World War II to the end of the 1900s and the secrets which develop between them over time.

== Bibliography ==
=== Novels ===
- Saints of Augustine (2008)
- In Mike We Trust (2009)
- Gemini Bites (2011)
- Buckeye: A Novel (2025)

=== Short story collections ===
- Send Me (2006)
- The Dream Life of Astronauts (2016)
