= Beautyland =

2024 novel by Marie-Helene Bertino

- Author: Marie-Helene Bertino
- Publisher: Farrar, Straus and Giroux
- Publication date: January 16, 2024
- Publication place: United States
- Pages: 336
- ISBN: 0-374-72189-0

Beautyland is a novel by Marie-Helene Bertino. It was published on January 16, 2024, by Farrar, Straus and Giroux. The book follows Adina, who is sent by aliens before birth to find out if they could live on earth and reports to them via a fax machine. The book starts with Adina's birth, which takes place in 1977 when Voyager 1 was launched.

== Reception ==
Alexandra Jacobs of The New York Times called the novel "astonishing" and says that the novel "refuses to give in to sentimentality or serendipity or the idea of everything working out for a reason". Michael Schaub writing for The Boston Globe called the piece a "shimmering masterpiece from an author with talent to spare". In Bomb, author Hilary Leichter said "Bertino taps into a particular nostalgic awe familiar to a generation of kids raised on Carl Sagan and inflatable lunchroom planetariums" and called the protagonist's observations "breathtaking, mundane, and sometimes both."

The novel received starred reviews from Kirkus Reviews and Publishers Weekly. The former described the novel as "A heartbreaking book that staggers with both truth and beauty." While the latter publication said, "Bertino nimbly portrays her protagonist’s alienhood as both metaphor and reality. The results are divine."
