= Alchemised =

2025 novel by SenLinYu

- First edition
- Author: SenLinYu
- Illustrator: Avendell
- Cover artist: Eva Eller; design by Regina Flath (first edition)
- Language: English
- Genre: Dark fantasy, Gothic fiction, Horror, Gothic romance, Romantic fantasy.
- Publisher: Del Rey (USA); Michael Joseph (UK)
- Publication date: September 23, 2025
- Pages: 1040
- ISBN: 978-0-593-97270-0
- Website: alchemisedbook.com

Alchemised is the debut fantasy novel of American author SenLinYu, published in September 2025 by Del Rey Books in the United States and Penguin imprint Michael Joseph in the United Kingdom, New Zealand and Australia. Originally published online from April 2018 to August 2019 as Manacled, a Harry Potter/The Handmaid's Tale fan fiction web serial about the "Dramione" ship between Hermione Granger and Draco Malfoy, and described as dark fantasy, horror and gothic romance, and sometimes classified as dark romance, the standalone novel follows the life of a former alchemist, Helena Marino, as she recovers her memories of a civil war. It reached number one on the New York Times best-seller list in the week after its release.

== Background and development ==
Originally published online from April 27, 2018 to August 19, 2019 as Manacled, a fan fiction web serial which combined the intellectual properties of Harry Potter and The Handmaid's Tale and received mainstream media attention, to reimagine the Harry Potter series in a dark alternative universe, with a romance between Harry Potter characters Hermione Granger and Draco Malfoy,

In February 2024, it was announced that the North American publishing rights to the novel had been acquired by Emily Archbold at Del Rey in a two book deal and that SenLinYu had begun the process of redrafting Manacled in December 2022 to remove all references to Harry Potter and The Handmaid's Tale, SenLinYu stating they were inspired to do so in part because of unauthorized monetisation of the novel by fans, the rewritten version being a way for SenLinYu to benefit from the work's popularity. In a 2024 interview with Rolling Stone, they described the process of removing references to copyrighted intellectual properties from the work as "liberating" but "definitely hard".

Manacled was ultimately removed from the fanfiction website Archive of Our Own, where it had been initially published, on January 1, 2025, in advance of being re-published as Alchemised, with all Harry Potter and The Handmaid's Tale excised.

The published book's plot is largely similar to the original online version, with SenLinYu stating they maintained scenes that they felt had been integral to Manacled, with Hermione Granger renamed Helena Marino, and Draco Malfoy renamed Kaine Ferron.

== Plot and structure ==
Alchemised is mostly told in third person limited focusing on the experiences of the main character, Helena Marino. The book is divided into three parts, with the story being continuous between parts one and three and, in part two, shifting to focus on four years before the events of part one.

The novel follows Helena Marino, a former alchemy student and resistance healer, imprisoned after the end of a civil war. After waking from 14 months of stasis, Helena is interrogated and tortured before discovering that her mind has been magically altered leaving her unable to remember details of her life before the end of the war. After being fitted with magic (referred to as Resonance) nullifying manacles, she is transported to the home of The High Reeve, and her former academic rival, Kaine Ferron, for experimentation to recover her memories. Whilst imprisoned, Helena repeatedly undergoes Transference, in which Ferron enters her mind, causing her to suffer from temporary brain inflammation and seizures. Unable to escape the house, she repeatedly attempts to kill herself, being prevented each time by Ferron. Eventually, The High Necromancer who now rules the country, Morrough, determines that Helena erased her own memories. Helena later discovers, via the newspapers to which she is allowed access, the re-emergence of The Resistance through the assassination of the warden, Mandl, who had initially imprisoned her.

Without her knowledge, Helena's sterilization is non-consensually reversed by Morrough's scientist, Doctor Stroud. She is forcefully enrolled in the country's Repopulation Programme and told that she and Ferron must conceive a child within two months. Over the course of a weeks, Ferron attempts to impregnate Helena when she is ovulating, unwillingly. Two weeks later, Stroud determines that Helena is pregnant; as Helena becomes increasingly depressed and physically weakened she eventually recovers her lost memories.

Beginning four years prior to the events of part one, the story begins to recount Helena's lost memories in part 2.

The story then returns to the point at which Helena regained her memories in part 3.

== Publication ==
In September 2025, Alchemised was released with an initial print run of 750,000 books in anticipation of high demand. The book was initially translated into 21 languages. At the time of its release, Alchemised was Penguin's most pre-ordered debut of 2025.

The book's cover was designed by Eva Eller. A black and white interior illustration by Avendell, the artist who had created the cover and illustrations for the fanfiction Manacled, was featured in the book. Eleven additional scene illustrations were released as a pre-order incentive.

SenLinYu promoted the book through USA and UK wide book tours as well as appearances at the 2025 San Diego and 2025 London comic cons.

== Reception ==
Alchemised received generally positive reviews from critics. Kirkus Reviews praised the novel's worldbuilding and imagery, which it felt gave the book a fresh feel, though it found the melodrama excessive at times. Lucy Baugher Milas of Paste praised its dark romance and brisk pacing despite the book's length, but criticized the repetitiveness of its romantic scenes and described the secondary characters as thinly sketched, arguing that the book relies on readers bringing their knowledge of Harry Potter to its relationships. Lisa Tuttle of The Guardian found the novel very readable.

The book's wider reception was mostly positive. In its first week, Alchemised was reported to have sold 145,000 copies in the United States according to publishing platform BookScan. The book was an instant number one bestseller in The New York Times, USA Today, Los Angeles Times and Indie bestseller lists. Amazon's editors included it in their list of the best romantasy books of 2025. Alchemised won the 2025 Goodreads Choice Award for Readers' Favourite Debut Novel and was nominated for the Goodreads Choice Award for Readers' Favourite Romantasy coming second. The audiobook, narrated by Saskia Maarleveld, was also nominated for the Goodreads Choice Award for Reader's Favourite Audiobook.

The book remained on The New York Times combined print and e-book fiction bestseller list for 15 consecutive weeks.

== Short story ==
In October 2026, issue 48 of Grimdark Magazine published a short story by Senlinyu titled Underbelly, which is set in the same universe as Alchemised.

== Adaptations ==
On September 10, 2025 it was announced that the movie rights to Manacled/Alchemised had been purchased by Legendary Entertainment in a seven-figure deal. The deal was made as part of a pre-emptive offer to prevent expected competition for the book's adaptation rights, and is thought to be one of the highest amounts paid for a book's movie rights: exceeding $3 million. In a statement to The Hollywood Reporter, SenLinYu stated that they "were honored by Legendary's incredible enthusiasm for the project and can't wait to see the world of Paladia come to life". The movie is not yet in production.
