= Rachel Gillig =

American author (born 1989)

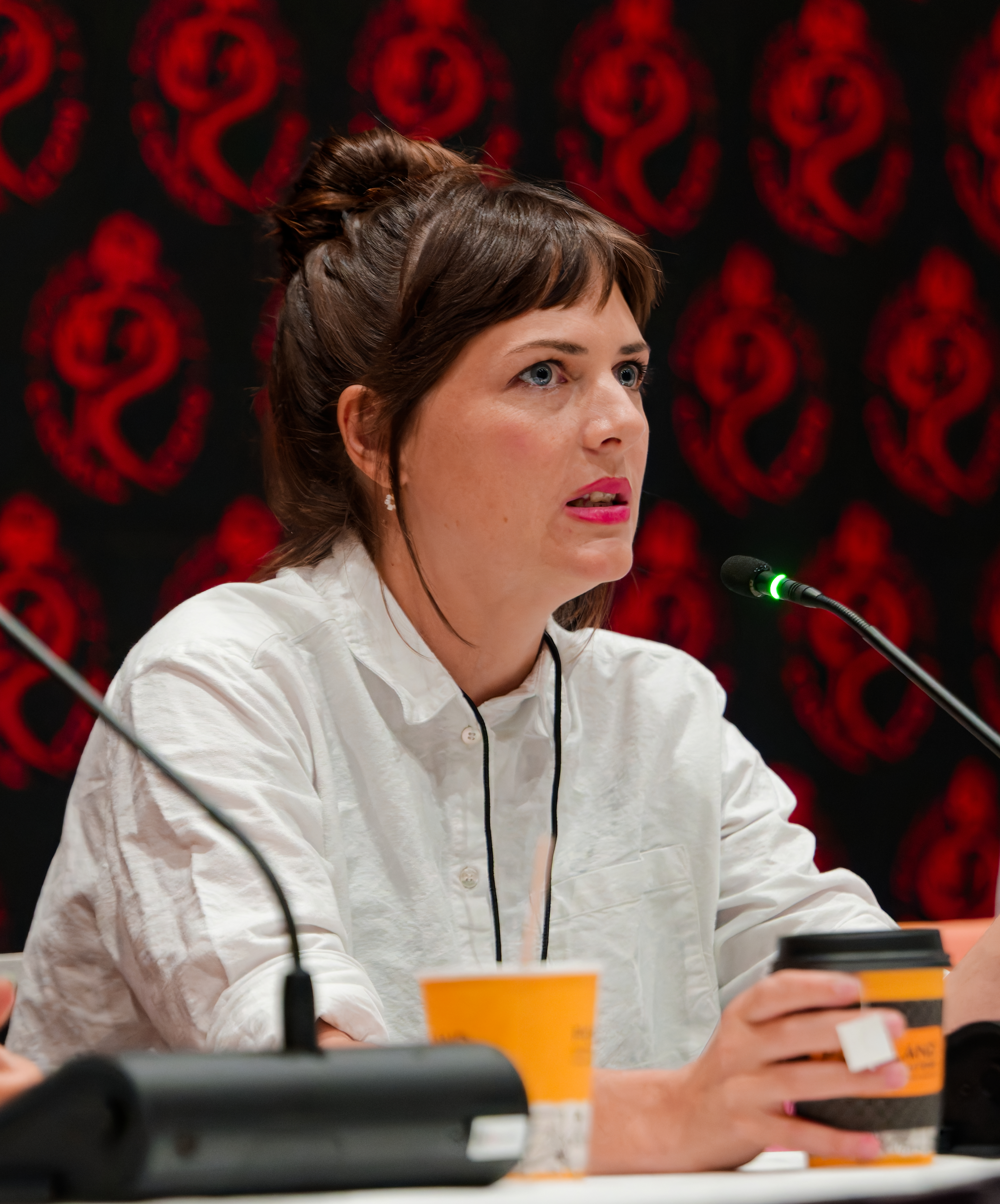
- Gillig speaking at Rose City Comic Con, 2025
- Born: September 23, 1989 (age 37); California, U.S.
- Education: University of California, Davis
- Occupation: Novelist
- Children: 1
- Writing career
- Period: 2022–present
- Genres: Romantic fantasy, gothic fiction
- Notable works: The Shepherd King, Stonewater Kingdom
- Website: rachelgillig.com

Rachel Gillig (born September 23, 1989) is an American gothic romantic fantasy author. She is known for her duologies The Shepherd King and Stonewater Kingdom.

== Early life and education ==
Gillig was born and raised on the coast of California. Both of her grandmothers were artists—one was a painter and the other, a pianist.

She has a bachelor's degree from University of California, Davis. Originally majoring in art history, she eventually switched to literary theory and criticism. Before becoming a full-time writer, she worked as a preschool teacher and as an artist.

== Career ==
All of Gillig's published novels have been parts of a duology. She has said that she prefers writing these because of a desire for her works to feel like "one long book with an intermission between".

Her first duology, The Shepherd King, consists of One Dark Window (2022) and Two Twisted Crowns (2023). Her second Stonewater Kingdom duology starts with The Knight and the Moth (2025) while its conclusion The Knave and the Moon is set for release in September 2026.

Many of her stories are inspired by folklore, particularly folk ballads. For instance, The Knight and the Moth was inspired by The Outlandish Knight.

== Personal life ==
Gillig lives in California with her husband and son.

She has stated that she is prone to performance anxiety.

She is outspoken against artificial intelligence, calling it "theft" and opposing its impact on the environment and on users' critical thinking skills.

== Works ==
=== The Shepherd King series ===
- One Dark Window (2022)
- Two Twisted Crowns (2023)

=== Stonewater Kingdom series ===
- The Knight and the Moth (2025)
- The Knave and the Moon (2026)
