= When Crack Was King =

2023 nonfiction book by Donovan X. Ramsey

- Author: Donovan X. Ramsey
- Language: English
- Published: 2023
- Publication place: United States

When Crack Was King: A People's History of a Misunderstood Era is a 2023 nonfiction book written by Donovan X. Ramsey.

== Critical reception ==
When Crack Was King was critically-acclaimed upon its release with positive reviews from publications including the Los Angeles Times, The New York Times, Kirkus Reviews, NPR, Apple Books, Publishers Weekly, and The Guardian. The Washington Post named the book a notable new release in a "summer of big books." It was on Vanity Fair's July 2023 list of "The Best New Books to Read This Summer" and Time magazine's "10 New Books You Should Read in July."

When Crack Was King was also honored on a number of best-of lists in 2023, including The Washington Post's "50 notable works of nonfiction," Audible's "The 12 best history listens of 2023," Time's "100 Must-Read Books of 2023," and Publishers Weekly's "Best Nonfiction of 2023." In addition, it was named to NPR's 2023 "Books We Love" list and Amazon's "The Best Books of 2023" and "Best History Books of 2023."

"An excellent work of people-first journalism, When Crack Was King offers not only a vivid and frank history, but points to the way communities tend to save themselves even as they're being actively targeted by state policy and violence," wrote Ilana Masad for NPR. For the New York Times, Jonathan Green wrote, "Ramsey aims to give the story of the crack epidemic a human face while telling it from start to finish, a herculean task. By and large he succeeds." In her review for The Los Angeles Times, Zan Romanoff wrote that When Crack Was King, "manages to convey the scope of history while also remaining grounded in the specific and personal. And it feels particularly relevant as America stares down another drug epidemic with no clear end in sight."

"Ramsey's debut work of nonfiction is a master class in disrupting a stubborn narrative, a monumental feat for the fraught subject of addiction in Black communities," wrote Zachary Siegel in a review for The Washington Post, "Thanks to Ramsey's diligent work, the crack era no longer feels distant and fragmented."

The book received a coveted starred reviews from both Publishers Weekly and Kirkus with latter calling When Crack Was King, "Passionate, important reportage on a tragic era in American history from an author who lived through it."

== Awards and honors ==
When Crack Was King was one of ten books named to the 2023 Longlist for the National Book Award for Nonfiction. "The titles on the list were selected from six hundred and thirty eight submissions from publishers," noted The New Yorker. In its announcement, the National Book Foundation wrote, "Journalist Donovan X. Ramsey explores the crack epidemic of the 1980s and 1990s through four profiles of individuals whose lives were impacted by the crisis. Connecting the civil rights era and war on drugs to today's conversations about police brutality, gentrification, and mass incarceration, When Crack Was King: A People's History of a Misunderstood Era argues that the low-income Black and brown communities disproportionately affected should receive the assistance they have been denied for generations."

The book was also finalist for the National Book Critics Circle's John Leonard Prize for the publishing year 2023. Named for the longtime critic and NBCC co-founder John Leonard, the Leonard Prize recognizes the best book by a first-time author in any genre.
