= Jihyun Yun =

American author and poet

- Education: University of California, Davis (BA); New York University (MFA)
- Writing career
- Notable work: And The River Drags Her Down (2025)
- Notable awards: Prairie Schooner Book Prize (2019)

Jihyun Yun is an American author and poet. She authored the poetry collection Some Are Always Hungry (2020) and the young adult novel And The River Drags Her Down (2025). Beyond book-length works, Yun's writing has been published in Ninth Letter, The Southeast Review, Entropy, The Adroit Journal, Sycamore Review, Hunger Mountain, Narrative Magazine, The Columbia Review, and Blue Mesa Review, among others.

Yun is of Korean descent and was raised in the San Francisco Bay Area, California. She earned a Bachelor of Arts in psychology from the University of California, Davis and a Master of Fine Arts from New York University. As of 2026, Yun lived in Ann Arbor, Michigan.

== Some Are Always Hungry (2020) ==
Some Are Always Hungry is a poetry collection published by The University of Nebraska Press in September 2020. The collection covers "themes of food, the legacy of Japan's occupation of Korea, and the ubiquity of misogynistic violence". Publishers Weekly highlighted how "Yun lingers over descriptions in precise and evocative language".

Some Are Always Hungry won the 2019 Prairie Schooner Book Prize in Poetry. It was named one of the best books of 2020 by the Asian American Writers' Workshop, and The Yale Review included it on their list of their "Favorite Cultural Artifacts of 2020".

== And The River Drags Her Down (2025) ==
And The River Drags Her Down is a young adult paranormal novel, published by Knopf on October 7, 2025. Told in alternating third-person perspective, the novel follows 17-year-old Korean-American Soojin Han. Like other women in her family, she can revive the dead, through she's been warned against reviving anything larger than her palm. After her mother's death, her older sister, Mirae, takes on responsibility of raising her due to her father's overwhelming grief. When Mirae drowns, however, Soojin brings her back to life, where she begins to understand the family rule to never reanimate humans.

And The River Drags Her Down was well received by critiques, including starred reviews from Kirkus Reviews, Publishers Weekly. Kirkus Reviews called the novel "a beautifully written, grief-filled tale that's equal parts creepy and heart-wrenching". Publishers Weekly highlighted how the "lyrical prose renders meaningful, tear-jerking sequences and propulsive horror alongside frank examinations of the cycles of generational trauma".

And The River Drags Her Down was named among the best books of the year by The Bulletin of the Center for Children's Books, the Chicago Public Library, the Children's Book Review, Kirkus Reviews, Publishers Weekly, and Reactor. In October 2025, The Guardian included the novel in their roundup of "the best new picture books and novels". The novel is shortlisted for the 2026 Waterstones Children's Book Prize for Older Readers.
