= Master Slave Husband Wife =

2023 non-fiction book by Ilyon Woo

Master Slave Husband Wife: An Epic Journey from Slavery to Freedom is a 2023 non-fiction book by Ilyon Woo that examines the history of the escape of Ellen and William Craft, two 19th-century American abolitionists, from slavery.

The book was published by Simon & Schuster.

== Reception ==
It was named one of the 10 Best Books of 2023 by The New York Times and one of the 100 must-read books of 2023 by Time. The book won the 2024 Pulitzer Prize for Biography with the award committee calling it "an American love story—one that would challenge the nation's core precepts of life, liberty, and justice for all—one that challenges us even now."
