= The Hurricane Wars =

2023 fantasy romance novel

- Author: Thea Guanzon
- Cover artist: Kelly Chong
- Language: English
- Genre: Fantasy, romance
- Publisher: Harper Voyager
- Publication date: October 3, 2023
- Pages: 472
- ISBN: 9780063277274

The Hurricane Wars is a 2023 romantic fantasy novel by Thea Guanzon. The novel is inspired by Southeast Asian mythology, specifically Philippine mythology. It also started as Star Wars' fan fiction, in which Kylo Ren and Rey are forced into an arranged marriage.

A sequel, A Monsoon Rising, was published in 2024.

== Plot ==
The novel is set in the Hurricane Wars, the name given to the ongoing conflict between the country, Sardovian Allfold, and the Kesathese Night Empire that were started twenty years prior. These wars were a result of the Lightweavers of Sunstead (a portion of the Sardovian Allfold) killing the Night Emperor, Ozalus Ossinast, resulting in the Night Empire eradicating Lightweavers and destroying Sunstead. Since then, the two have been at war.

The novel begins with Talasyn, a soldier for the Sardovian army, right before an attack by the Night Empire. During this battle, Talasyn finds herself in trouble and uses her Lightweave magic, a power she has kept hidden since her birth, to defend herself. Alaric, son of the Emperor Gaheris, the current emperor of the Night Empire, arrives and fights her, but find themselves unusually matched. Talasyn retreats, where the head of the Sardovian forces directs Talasyn to travel to Nenavar to reach a Light Sever, a device which will allow her to train and grow stronger.

Alaric receives information about Talasyn's mission and travels to intercept her before she can reach the Light Sever. Once again, they fight, though this time they are interrupted by Nenavarene soldiers. During interrogation, Elagbi, the Crown Prince of Nenavar, shows up and informs Talasyn that she is actually his long-lost daughter and heir to the throne.

Both Talasyn and Alaric end up escaping Nenavar, continuing to fight for their respective factions. Talasyn once again fights Alaric, resulting in their powers combining before Talasyn escapes. Realizing their army has lost, the Sardovians venture back to Nenavar for asylum, which is granted on the condition that Talasyn must accept her position as heir to throne.

Several months later, the Night Empire's warships approach Nenavar, threatening the region and demanding they surrender. Nenavar refuses and, instead, offers a marriage alliance between Alaric and Talasyn. During marriage negotiations, Nenavar reveals that there is an upcoming threat: the Night of the World-Eater, when the Voidfell Sever pulses and kills everything it touches. They believe that the upcoming Night of the World-Eater will expand all the way to the Continent, killing everyone and everything. Both Alaric and Talasyn agree to work together to attempt to forge a shield to stop the World-Eater.

Despite the tension and avid dislike between them, Alaric and Talasyn begin to trust each other. Once they are married, their relationship becomes momentarily passionate, leaving both conflicted over their feelings for each other and their loyalty to their people. At the end of the novel, Alaric meets his father, who reveals that his plan is permanently deprive Talasyn of her Lightweave abilities and take over the whole of Nenavar.

== Characters ==
- Talasyn Alunsina: main protagonist who is the daughter of Hanan and Elagbi
- Prince Alaric Ossinast: crown prince of the Night Empire
- Khaede: Talasyn's best friend
- Coxswain Darius: Talasyn's comrade
- Vela: Kesathese defector for army
- Gaheris Ossinast: A Night Emperor and Alaric's father
- Elagbi : Urduja's son and Hannah's husband
- Urduja : Queen of Nenavar
