= Xenobe Purvis =

British writer and literary researcher

- Born: Xenobe Eva Wendela Purvis; 1990 (age 35–36); Tokyo, Japan
- Education: University of Oxford; Royal Holloway, University of London

Xenobe Eva Wendela Purvis (born 1990) is a British novelist and literary researcher. She is known for her debut novel The Hounding (2025).

== Early life ==
Purvis was born in Tokyo to British parents. She and her older sister Kerensa founded the Anglo-Japanese cross-cultural art and design platform Nomikomu.

Purvis studied English at Oxford University. She graduated with a Master of Arts (MA) from Royal Holloway, University of London.

== Career ==
After completing her MA, Purvis continued her literary research. She worked as an assistant researcher for Katherine Bucknell's biography of Christopher Isherwood before joining the Christopher Isherwood Foundation.

In November 2023, Hutchinson Heinemann acquired the rights to publish Purvis' debut novel The Hounding in August 2025. The novel is based on physician John Freind's 1700 Oxfordshire account of five sisters "seized with frequent barking in the manner of dogs". The Hounding was a New York Times Book Club pick, an American Booksellers Association Indies Introduce pick, and named a must-read book of 2025 by Time Magazine.

== Works ==
=== Novels ===
- Purvis, Xenobe (5 August 2025). The Hounding. London: Hutchinson Heinemann. ISBN 978-1-250-36638-2.

=== Select essays ===
- "Groaning Glaciers" in The London Magazine (2019)
- "A weakness for toads: How Christopher Isherwood foretold his own betrayal" in The Times Literary Supplement (2022)
