= Yume Kitasei =

American author and civil servant (born 1987)

- 北清夢
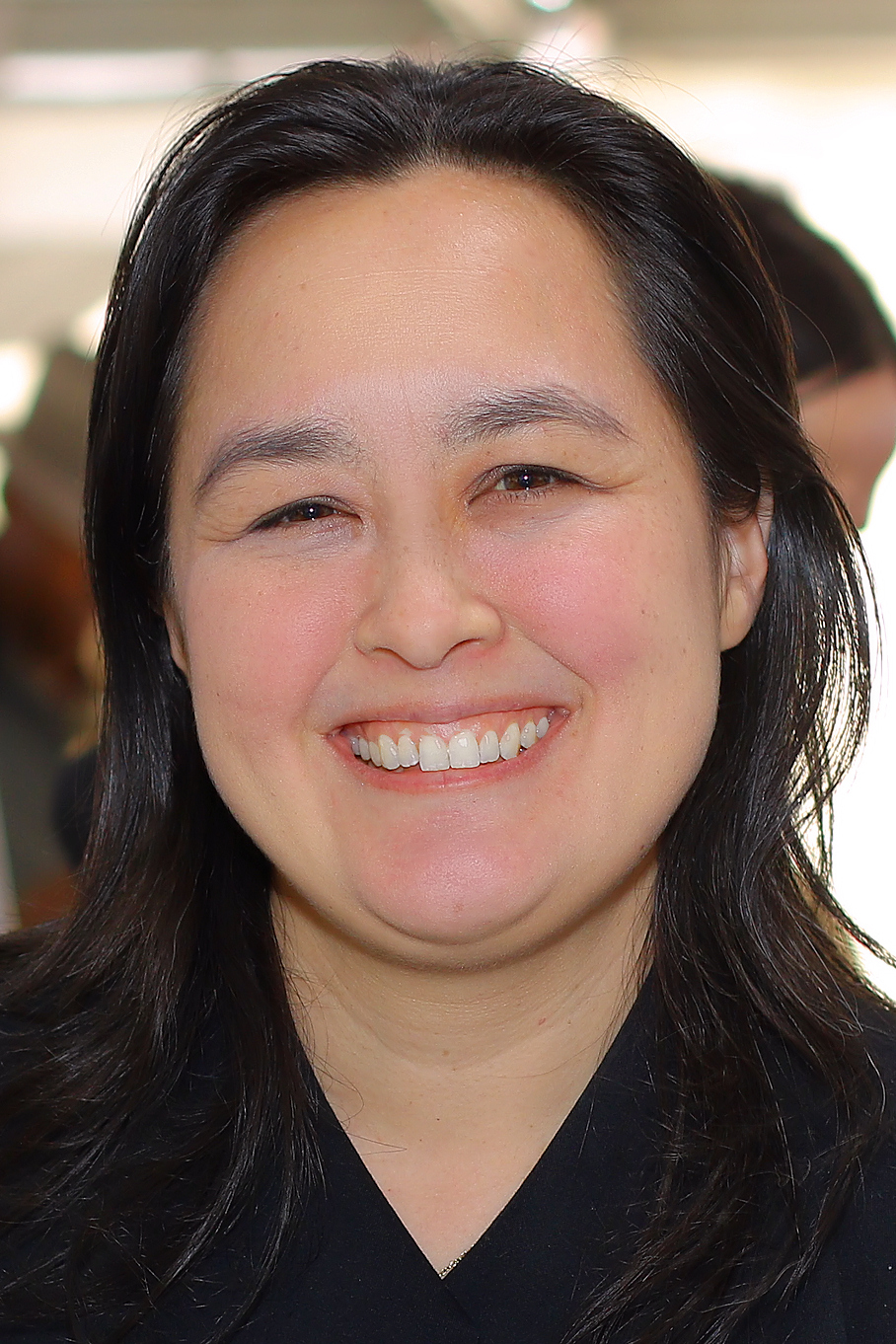
- Kitasei in 2025
- Born: October 14, 1987 (age 39); New York City
- Education: Princeton University (BA)
- Occupations: Novelist and public servant
- Website: https://www.yumekitasei.com

Yume Kitasei (Japanese: 北清夢, born October 14, 1987) is a speculative fiction author and public servant in New York City government, currently serving as the commissioner of the New York City Department of Citywide Administrative Services (DCAS) for the Mamdani administration. Her books include The Deep Sky, The Stardust Grail, and Saltcrop, with a fourth, Envoy, expected in 2027.

Kitasei spent her childhood between Tokyo and New York. She graduated from Stuyvesant High School and pursued a career in public service. As of 2026, she has worked for the De Blasio, Wright, and Mamdani administrations. In addition to politics, Kitasei writes speculative fiction novels.

== Early life ==
Kitasei was born in New York City on October 14, 1987 to a Japanese father and American mother. Her first name, Yume, means "dream" in Japanese.

She spent her childhood in New York and Tokyo and attended Stuyvesant High School and Princeton University. Kitasei currently lives in Brooklyn.

== Political career ==
While a student at Stuyvesant High School, Kitasei started interning for the New York City government, where she became interested in a career in public service.

Since then, Kitasei has been a New York City government official for many years, working with three different mayoral administrations. Under the De Blasio administration, Kitasei was the chief of staff to the deputy mayor for operations. In 2021, Kitasei took a break to work on her career as an author, but returned to public service in 2022 to work as chief of staff to the first deputy mayor for Sheena Wright under the Adams administration. In 2026, she was appointed to the role of the Department of Citywide Administrative Services (DCAS) commissioner by Zohran Mamdani.

As Commissioner of DCAS, Kitasei oversees the civil service system, the city fleet, citywide procurement, real estate, energy management, and the management of 56 office buildings. She opened the Manhattan Municipal Building to the public for tours. In July 2026, Kitasei announced that civil service exams will now be free for high schoolers and those who have not taken the examination before. In the fall of 2026, the agency opened the first free childcare center for city employees.

== Writing ==
Kitasei has published multiple speculative fiction novels that focus on humanity's interaction with the environment, climate fiction, and space operas. Her books have been published in half a dozen languages and shortlisted for the Libby and Goodreads Choice Awards.

== Works ==
- The Deep Sky (2023)
- The Stardust Grail (2024)
- Saltcrop (2025)
