= The Ministry of Time (novel) =

2024 novel by Kaliane Bradley

- Author: Kaliane Bradley
- Language: English
- Genre: Science fiction, Romance
- Publisher: Hodder & Stoughton
- Publication date: 2024
- Publication place: United Kingdom
- Media type: Print (hardback and paperback)
- Pages: 352
- ISBN: 9781668045145

The Ministry of Time is a 2024 debut novel by Kaliane Bradley. It was originally published by Hodder & Stoughton. The novel is a sci-fi romance about a government employee in the newly founded Ministry of Time, taking care of one of the first time-travellers, known as "expats".

== Plot ==
In the 21st century, the government of the United Kingdom finds a door that allows time travel. They create the Ministry of Time. The Ministry rescues several historical figures and brings them to the present; to avoid disrupting the past, they specifically choose people who would have died in their original timelines. They refer to these "time refugees" as "expats". Each expat is assigned a "bridge," an employee who will teach them about the modern world.

The novel's unnamed narrator is the daughter of a British man and a Cambodian immigrant. She is assigned to be the bridge to Graham Gore, an explorer who would have died on Franklin's lost expedition. The other expats include Lieutenant Thomas Cardingham, extracted from the Battle of Naseby (1645); Margaret "Maggie" Kemble, extracted from the Great Plague of London (1665); Anne Spencer, extracted from the French Revolution (1793); and Captain Arthur Reginald-Smyth, extracted from the Battle of the Somme (1916).

The narrator teaches Gore about the modern world. Over the next months, they have discussions about Britain's changing views on race, imperialism, gender, religion, and sexuality, among other topics. The narrator becomes good friends with Maggie and Arthur, as well as her fellow bridge Simellia.

The narrator's handler Quentin is shot and killed. Adela, the Vice Secretary of the Ministry, becomes the narrator's new handler. The narrator and Gore are attacked by two spies from the future: the Brigadier and Salese. After the Ministry acquired the time door, these spies were trapped in the story’s present (their past). A mole is leaking information to the two spies, placing all of the bridges and expats at risk. Gore and the narrator are moved to a safe house. There, they become lovers.

Arthur is killed. Maggie's safe house is attacked, but she survives. Maggie, Cardingham, Gore, and the narrator escape to a pre-arranged safe area. The narrator reveals that all the expats have implanted microchips so that the Ministry can track them. She helps them remove the chips, but Graham is shocked by this perceived betrayal.

The narrator leaves to get help from Adela. The narrator and Adela are attacked by the spies from the future. Adela kills Salese, while the Brigadier escapes. Adela reveals that she is the narrator's future self. In Adela's original timeline, she and Gore married and had a son. She was sent back in time to ensure that the Ministry retained its power and that history progressed along her preferred timeline. She killed Quentin because he was the mole in her previous timeline. In Adela's previous timeline, the Ministry killed Arthur and Maggie. Adela, feeling betrayed that the Ministry killed her friends, gives the narrator access codes. Graham holds Adela at gunpoint while the narrator returns to the Ministry headquarters.

At the Ministry, the narrator encounters Simellia and the Brigadier. Simellia is revealed to be the mole. She believes that the future Ministry will become a fascist organization that contributes to billions of deaths through climate change and imperialism. The narrator damages the time door, which kills the Brigadier. Simellia escapes.

The narrator returns home, where she meets Graham; Adela was killed when the time door was damaged. Graham holds her at gunpoint. He forces the narrator to use Adela's access codes to delete all of the Ministry's files. Graham flees with the surviving expats. The narrator is fired by the Ministry, receives a redundancy payoff, and is barred from returning to the Ministry building. In a final conversation with the Secretary, it is revealed that Simellia is blamed for damaging the time door. Cardingham is captured; Graham and Maggie remain at large. Months later, the narrator receives a photograph from Graham and Maggie, revealing that they have traveled to Alaska. The narrator resolves to travel to find them.

The narrator reveals that she is writing the entire novel to her past self in case the time door is ever repaired. The postscript instructs the reader to be wary of making the same mistakes as the narrator and that she is forgiven.

== Creation ==
Bradley conceived of the novel during the 2020 COVID pandemic, while watching the AMC series The Terror, in which Gore is a minor character. To entertain friends, she wrote vignettes for several weeks imagining Gore brushing up against modern England.

== Reception and awards ==
Writing for Literary Review, Ed Cumming dubbed it, "the loudest debut of the year" and "a gleeful romp across genres." Writing for the Los Angeles Times, Lauren LeBlanc called it a "witty, thought-provoking romance novel."

Radio New Zealand described it as: "Part time-travel rom-com, part-spy thriller, it's a genre-bending mix of science fiction that also tackles big themes including colonisation, climate change and migration."

Year	Award	Category	Result	Ref.
2024	Amazon Books Best Book of the Year	Fiction	Shortlisted	
2024	Bollinger Everyman Wodehouse Prize	—	Shortlisted	
2024	Dymocks Book of the Year	—	Won	
2024	Good Morning America	Book Club Selection	Selected	
2024	Goodreads Choice Awards	Science Fiction	Won	
2024	Goodreads Choice Awards	Debut Novel	Finalist–2nd	
2024	Waterstones Debut Fiction Prize	—	Shortlisted	
2025	Arthur C. Clarke Award	–	Shortlisted	
2025	Audie Award	Fiction	Finalist	
2025	Australian Book Industry Awards	International Book	Won	
2025	Authors' Club First Novel Award	—	Longlisted	
2025	British Book Awards	Debut Fiction	Shortlisted	
2025	Climate Fiction Prize	—	Shortlisted	
2025	Hugo Award	Novel	Finalist	
2025	Jhalak Prize	Prose	Longlisted	
2025	Libby Book Award	Science Fiction	Won	
2025	Women's Prize for Fiction	—	Longlisted	

== Adaptations ==
In February 2024, the BBC announced it had commissioned a new drama based on the novel, from Alice Birch. The six-part series is produced by A24 for BBC One and BBC iPlayer. Filming started in August 2026.

The audiobook is narrated by actor Katie Leung, with George Weightman narrating the chapters of polar explorer Commander Graham Gore.

== Plagiarism allegation ==
Fans of Spanish TV series El ministerio del tiempo raised suspicions of plagiarism, backed by series creator Javier Olivares himself. RTVE stated its intention to "request explanations from the BBC about the announcement it made without prejudice to the rights it has in the defense of its interests".

The novel's author Kaliane Bradley responded on social media, stating her novel was an original work of fiction based around Franklin's lost expedition and inspired by AMC's The Terror, and that she had never seen the Spanish series in question.
