= Jennifer Givhan =

American author and poet

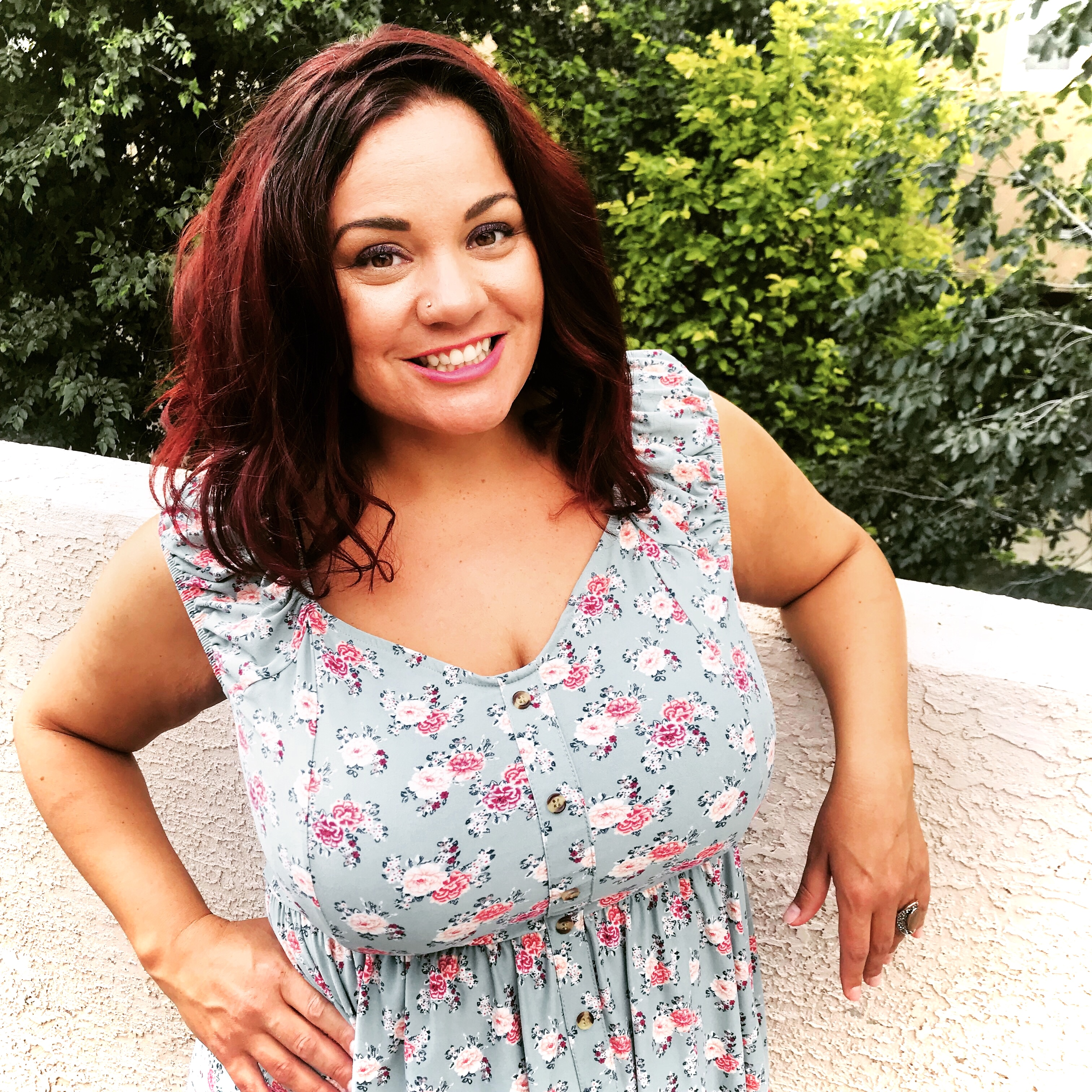
Jennifer Givhan

Jennifer Givhan (born c. 1984) is a Mexican-American and Indigenous poet and novelist from the Southwestern United States. She is the author of five full-length poetry collections and five novels. Her novel Trinity Sight won The Southwest Book Award in 2020.

She often writes about her "borderland identity" but broadens her narratives to resonate with anyone who has inhabited a liminal space between two cultures as Givhan grapples with both historical and personal pain from the past and demonstrates a yearning for a sense of belonging. She addresses "hijas wandering in their own deserts" to inspire and empower the women in the borderlands to and for whom she writes.

== Early life and education ==
Givhan was born circa 1984, and grew up on the Mexicali border in the Imperial Valley of Southern California, near the Salton Sea.

She earned a Master of Fine Arts from Warren Wilson College and a Master of Arts in English literature from California State University, Fullerton.

== Themes ==
Much of Givhan's poetry explores mother-daughter relationships, offering an understanding of motherhood that encompasses diverse caregiving roles, including traditional definitions of motherhood, emphasizing empathy and intersectionality. Drawing from her Mexican heritage and family background, she incorporates cultural elements into her work. Givhan's poetry and prose often engage with social issues and highlight marginalized voices.

== Awards and honors ==
Givhan has received multiple fellowships, including a National Endowment for the Arts Fellowship in Poetry (2015), a Pen/Rosenthal Emerging Voices Fellowship, and the Frost Place Latin@ Fellowship. In 2020, Booklist included Trinity Sight on their list of the year's "Top 10 SF/Fantasy & Horror Debuts". She has also received the following accolades:

- DASH Literary Journal Poetry Prize winner (2013)
- Andrés Montoya Poetry Prize finalist
- St. Lawrence Book Award finalist
- Vernice Quebodeaux Pathways finalist
- Prairie Schooner Book Prize finalist
- Spur Award finalist, River Woman, River Demon (2023)
- Southwest Book Award

== Personal life ==
Givhan lives with her family in Albuquerque, New Mexico.

== Selected publications ==
- Landscape with Headless Mama. Lena-Miles Wever Todd Poetry Series. Warrensburg, Missouri: Pleiades Press. 2016. ISBN 978-0-8071-6541-6.
- Protection Spell: Poems. Fayetteville: University of Arkansas Press. 2017. ISBN 978-1-68226-028-9.
- Girl with Death Mask. Blue light books. Bloomington, Indiana: Indiana University Press. 2018. ISBN 978-0-253-03279-9. OCLC 1007085056.
- Rosa's Einstein: Poems. Camino del sol: a Latina and Latino literary series. Tucson: The University of Arizona Press. 2019. ISBN 978-0-8165-3803-4.
- Trinity Sight. Ashland, OR: Blackstone Publishing. 2019. ISBN 978-1-5385-5672-6. OCLC 1083270438.
- Jubilee. Ashland, OR: Blackstone Publishing. 2020. ISBN 978-1-5385-5677-1. OCLC 1144754481.
- Regenerate: Prompts to Unlock Transformation. KDP Publishing. 2021. ISBN 979-8-5193-3118-0.
- Belly to the Brutal. Wesleyan poetry. Middletown, Connecticut: Wesleyan University Press. 2022. ISBN 978-0-8195-8096-2.
- River Woman, River Demon. Blackstone Publishing. 2022. ISBN 978-1-6650-5750-9.
- Salt Bones. Mulholland Books. 2025.
- The Sleeping Sisters. Little, Brown. 2026.
