= Ilyon Woo =

Korean American Author)

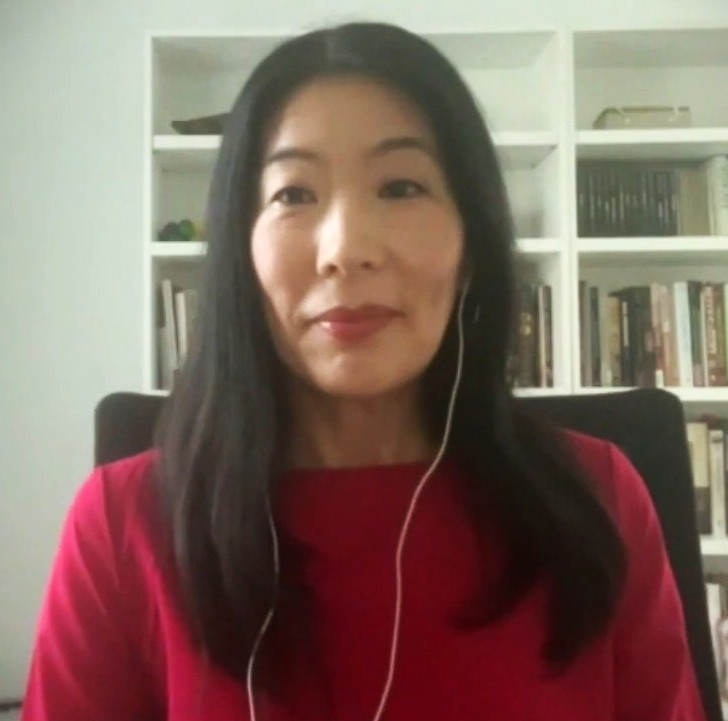
- Woo in 2025
- Education: Yale University, Columbia University
- Occupations: Non-fiction writer, writer
- Awards: Pulitzer Prize for Biography (2024)
- Website: ilyonwoo.com

Ilyon Woo is an American author of Korean descent. She won the 2024 Pulitzer Prize for Biography.

== Education ==
Woo attended the public elementary school King Open School in Cambridge, Massachusetts alongside Imani Perry. She graduated with a BA in the Humanities from Yale College in 1994. She received her PhD in English from Columbia University in 2004.

== Career ==
In 2010, Woo published The Great Divorce: A Nineteenth-Century Mother's Extraordinary Fight Against Her Husband, the Shakers, and Her Times, which takes place in the 19th century and focuses on Eunice Chapman.

Her 2023 book Master Slave Husband Wife: An Epic Journey from Slavery to Freedom, a history of the escape of Ellen and William Craft from slavery, was named one of the 10 Best Books of 2023 by The New York Times, one of the 100 must-read books of 2023 by Time, and won the 2024 Pulitzer Prize for Biography.

Woo was also a featured author at the 2024 Exeter Literature Festival and 2024 Newburyport Literary Festival.

== Books ==
- The Great Divorce: A Nineteenth-Century Mother's Extraordinary Fight Against Her Husband, the Shakers, and Her Times. Atlantic Monthly Press, 2010.
- Master Slave Husband Wife: An Epic Journey from Slavery to Freedom. 37 INK, 2023.
