= Buckeye (novel) =

Historical fiction novel by Patrick Ryan

- Author: Patrick Ryan
- Language: English
- Genre: Historical fiction
- Set in: Ohio
- Publisher: Penguin Random House, Bloomsbury Publishing
- Publication date: September 2, 2025
- Publication place: US
- ISBN: 9780593595039

Buckeye is a historical fiction novel by Patrick Ryan. The book follows two couples from the fictional town of Bonhomie, Ohio from World War II to the end of the 20th century and the secrets which develop between them. It is Ryan's first full length novel for adults and received favorable reviews from critics.

== Synopsis ==
On VE Day, Margaret Salt enters the hardware store where Cal Jenkins works in order to hear the radio broadcast announcing the surrender of Nazi Germany. Overjoyed, in part because her husband, Felix Salt, is serving in the navy, she shares a celebratory kiss with Cal. Cal is married to Becky, a spiritualist who can communicate with the dead. Felix is a closeted gay man who has an affair of his own while in the navy, while Margaret and Cal also have an affair prior to Felix's return from the war. Felix's affair partner, Augie, is killed when his ship is sunk and the war leaves Felix severely traumatized. Over the next 40 years, a network of secrets develop which threaten to tear both families apart.

== Development and major themes ==
The novel was partially inspired by an affair that Ryan's grandmother had kept a secret for decades while living in a small town in Ohio. Ryan aimed to write about the mechanics of keeping such a major secret for so long. In an interview with NPR, Ryan identified secrets and forgiveness as major themes of the novel. The Financial Times identified "the disconnect between marriage and desire" and "the ripple effect of war" as two key themes. Buckeye is the first novel for adults that Ryan has written, with his previous work consisting of short story collections and young adult novels.

== Reception ==
Buckeye received favorable reviews from critics. In a review for NPR, Maureen Corrigan wrote that Ryan "ambitiously aims here to write an American epic and he has the chops to do so." The Financial Times praised it as "masterfully woven together" and compared the novel to the work of John Irving. Writing for The New York Times, Jess Walter gave it a generally favorable review, called it "[o]mniscient, sweeping, [and] almost defiantly sentimental." However, he also described the interweaving of historical details into the story as becoming "rushed" near the end. A. K. Blakemore reviewed the book for The Guardian, writing that the book was "elevated throughout by the precision with which he captures the tiny, haunting glories of everyday suburban life," with Blakemore crediting this to Ryan's previous experience writing short stories. The Irish Times also gave it a favorable review, with the reviewer writing that the novel "never slackens: the novel is both ambitious in scope and startlingly nimble, a story that tackles dark times with lightness and compassion." The book was included in The Washington Post's 6 notable books of September. It also became a New York Times Best Seller.
