= The Stardust Grail =

2024 novel by Yume Kitasei

- Author: Yume Kitasei
- Language: English
- Genre: Science Fiction
- Publisher: Flatiron Books, an imprint of Macmillan Publishers
- Publication date: 11 June 2024
- Publication place: United States
- Pages: 311
- ISBN: 9781250875372

The Stardust Grail is a 2024 science fiction novel by Yume Kitasei. It tells the story of Maya, a retired art thief who embarks upon one last heist in order to save an alien species.

== Novel summary ==
=== Premise ===
Earth is connected to the wider universe by a series of nodes, originally built by an alien species known as the Frenro. During first contact, many humans died from a virus carried by the Frenro. In the modern era, effective vaccination programs have limited fatalities, but infected humans are still changed by the virus. They may gain minor telepathic connections to the Frenro, and may have vivid dreams that show glimpses of possible futures.

230 years prior to the story, millions of Frenro are killed in a war with the Belzoar. This war destroyed most of the cultural memory of the Frenro; they have also lost the ability to reproduce and are slowly going extinct. About one century prior to the beginning of the novel, human explorer Dr. Huang attempted to find a “stardust grail”, an artifact which is connected both to the Frenro reproductive cycle and the creation of new nodes. Since the time of Dr. Huang's travels, much of her research has been lost.

=== Plot ===
Maya Hoshimoto is a retired art thief. She survived a viral infection as a child, giving her a strong connection to her Frenro companion Auncle. Maya and Auncle were previously searching for a stardust grail while liberating stolen artifacts. After a heist on the Belzoar planet Lithis goes badly, thousands of Belzoar are infected with the virus and die. Maya retires from theft and becomes a graduate student at Princeton.

Princeton receives a bequest from a donor which happens to contain a previously unknown journal by Dr. Huang. The CNE (Coalition of Nations of Earth) believes that the journal can lead to a stardust grail. An unknown force begins destroying nodes, threatening to cut Earth off from galactic civilization. Dr. Garcia of the CNE attempts to hire Maya to retrieve the grail, but she declines. Dr. Garcia hires her supervisor Liam instead.

Maya steals Dr. Huang's journal and races Dr. Garcia's team to the grail. Auncle hires Wil (a retired CNE soldier) and Medix (a sentient robot) to assist. Both groups eventually make their way to the Belzoar planet Emerald. Both teams break into a Belzoar museum; Maya's team extracts a grail from among the collection of artifacts. Maya's crew flees to a Frenro planet. Dr. Garcia and Liam arrive in the system with CNE warships. Maya realizes that the grail they stole was only a replica. The Belzoar arrive, determined to attack the Frenro. They are defeated, but many Frenro are killed. The surviving flee, closing several nodes behind them.

Liam leaves Dr. Garcia's ship and joins Maya's crew. They search for the original grail found by Dr. Huang, and are led to a hostile planet. There, they find a museum known as the Encyclopedium, built by a civilization even more ancient than the Frenro. Maya retrieves a real grail, setting off a series of defense mechanisms. Liam is injured, while Medix is killed. Wil debates whether to take the grail to save humanity, but eventually returns to the group. From the AI controlling the Encyclopedium, the group learns that the grail is a symbiote. When an adult Frenro incubates the grail, said Frenro will both reproduce and transform into the final form of its life cycle: a node. Maya also discovers an artifact that may allow the creation of nodes outside of the Frenro life cycle. The crew decides to travel the universe, searching for the surviving Frenro.

== Reception ==
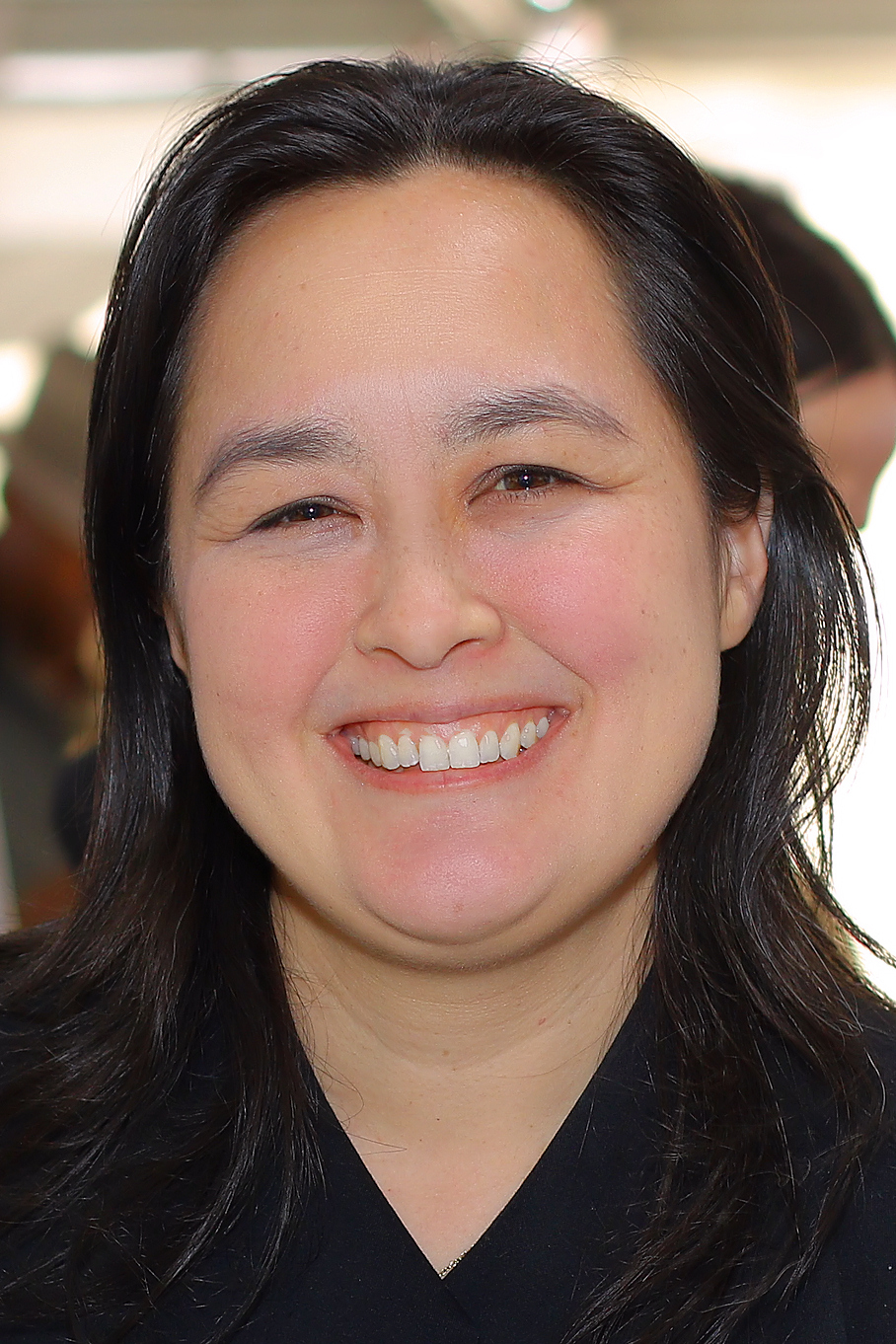
Author Yume Kitasei

In a starred review, Kirkus Reviews called the novel "wondrous, new, and altogether alien." The review praised the novel for its broad scope, "covering everything from the rise and fall of alien civilizations to what it means to be a person," as well as its "sympathetic, flawed characters." Kristi Chadwick of Library Journal called the novel "an emotional roller coaster of a space quest," praising the intimate prose.

In a review for Reactor, Maura Krause compares the beginning of the novel to the story of Indiana Jones, "a reference Kitasei very much intended." Krause notes that the initial section of the novel is slower-paced, but writes that this initial opening is "critical to framing Maya’s struggles, both ethical and personal." The review praises the relationship between Maya and Auncle, concluding that there is no easy answer "to the terrible quandary of what we owe to our species versus what we owe to the people (human or otherwise) that we love."

Donna Edwards of the Associated Press wrote that Kitasei "uses sci-fi to recontextualize issues ... like what determines personhood and whether artificial intelligence can obtain it, or when cultural adaptation becomes appropriation or oppression." Edwards felt that the first half of the plot was fairly predictable, but that the final portion of the novel "is when we start really digging into some planet exploration, history and lore, and weird bioscience fun. And the end, while a bit abrupt, was satisfying and earned."
