= SenLinYu =

American writer (born 1990/91)

- Born: 1990/1991 (age 35–36); Oregon, US
- Occupation: Author
- Writing career
- Years active: 2018–present
- Genres: Dark fantasy, gothic fiction, high fantasy, science fiction, romantic fantasy, fantasy fiction, horror
- Notable works: Manacled; Alchemised
- Website: www.senlinyuwrites.com

SenLinYu (born 1990 or 1991; also known as Sen) is an American writer best known as the author of Manacled, an adult dystopian fan fiction based on the Harry Potter and The Handmaid's Tale intellectual properties. The fanfiction, which provides an alternate ending to the Harry Potter series, gained popularity for its inclusion of a romantic relationship between Harry Potter characters Hermione Granger and Draco Malfoy.

By 2024, SenLinYu's online works had amassed over 16 million individual downloads and had been translated into 19 languages. Their (Note: SenLinYu uses she/her and they/them pronouns. This article uses they/them for consistency.) debut traditionally published novel Alchemised, a rewrite of Manacled set outside of the Harry Potter universe, was released in September 2025.

== Early life ==
SenLinYu was born in 1990 or 1991 and grew up near Portland, Oregon, in a conservative Christian family with six brothers. Their mother was a former professional ballerina and their father an evangelical pastor. SenLinYu is half Japanese. Their mother was born to a Japanese family interned in American concentration camps during World War II, despite holding US citizenship.

SenLinYu was home-schooled and went on to attend a Christian college. They graduated with a degree in classical arts and culture. During childhood, SenLinYu and their siblings had a strict conservative upbringing and were not allowed to read the Harry Potter books, leading SenLinYu to covertly read Harry Potter fanfiction on the family computer. After reading the Harry Potter books as a young adult, they were motivated to write their own fanfiction including themes and characters more prevalent in fan works.

== Writing ==
=== Manacled ===
Manacled was first shared on online fanfiction websites in April 2018. It was written in a piecemeal format and chapters were posted serially until the final chapter was released in August 2019. In total Manacled had 77 chapters, including three epilogue chapters and 370,515 words.

The story is set in a dark alternate universe following the events of the Harry Potter series up to Harry Potter and the Half-Blood Prince, where it diverged from the established canon. In this alternate narrative, Draco Malfoy successfully kills Dumbledore at the beginning of Sixth Year, leading to a period of war during which Harry Potter is killed by Lord Voldemort and the Order of the Phoenix is defeated by the Death Eaters. SenLinYu has described drawing inspiration for the fanfiction from the pilot episode of The Handmaid's Tale TV adaptation.

The work garnered attention throughout the Harry Potter fandom community during 2018 and 2019. After the COVID-19 pandemic began in March 2020, Manacled gained new popularity on TikTok, leading to the development of its own distinct fandom, including the creation of fan-made language translations and its own fanfiction. The work was featured in an Oprah Daily article on a list of the best Harry Potter fanfiction, and the fan artist Avendell created companion illustrations.

The work's internet popularity resulted in third parties selling unauthorized merchandise based on Manacled, including printed copies of the story featuring other people's fan art. Following continued online misuse by third parties, SenLinYu sought advice from the Organization for Transformative Works as well as other lawyers before deciding to rework Manacled into an original story to gain control of its distribution.

Manacled was removed from the web on January 1, 2025, in preparation for its release as a reworked traditionally published novel. On the day of its removal, it was the second-most-read work of all time posted to the fan work archive, Archive of Our Own, a site that at the time hosted over 13 million works. It was also one of the highest-rated works on the site with over 84,000 kudos (likes).

=== Alchemised ===
SenLinYu signed to literary agency WME in 2023. In February 2024, rights were acquired to traditionally publish the novel Alchemised, a rewrite of Manacled set outside the Harry Potter universe. The standalone dark fantasy novel was released in September 2025, published by Del Rey in the United States and Michael Joseph at Penguin Books in the United Kingdom. The book includes an illustration by the artist Avendell, who has also created further pieces to be released separately.

The official synopsis of Alchemised reads:

A woman with missing memories fights to survive a war-torn world of necromancy and alchemy – and the man tasked with unearthing the deepest secrets of her past. In the aftermath of a long war, Paladia's new ruling class of corrupt guild families and depraved necromancers – whose vile, undead creatures helped bring about their victory – holds Helena captive. Trapped on his crumbling estate, Helena's fight – to protect her lost history and to preserve the last remaining shreds of her former self – is just beginning. For her prison and captor have secrets of their own, secrets Helena must unearth, whatever the cost.

Anticipated demand for the novel was high, with Del Rey ordering a first print run of 750,000 copies of the book ahead of release, with translations in 21 languages.

=== Adaptations ===
On September 10, 2025, it was announced that the production company Legendary Entertainment had purchased the film rights to the, at the time, still to be released Alchemised novel in a pre-emptive 7-figure deal believed to be one of the biggest in history for a new book's movie rights, not adjusted for inflation.

== Awards ==
| Work | Year | Award | Category | Result | Ref. |
|---|---|---|---|---|---|
| Alchemised | 2025 | Goodreads Choice Awards | Romantasy | Nominated | |
| Alchemised | 2025 | Goodreads Choice Awards | Audiobook | Nominated | |
| Alchemised | 2025 | Goodreads Choice Awards | Debut Novel | Won | |
| Alchemised | 2026 | British Book Awards | Science Fiction and Fantasy | Won | |

== Personal life ==
SenLinYu is nonbinary and uses she/her and they/them pronouns. They live in Portland, Oregon with their husband and two children.
