= Jeneva Rose =

- Born: April 6, 1989 (age 37)
- Occupation: Novelist
- Writing career
- Genres: Thriller; women's fiction; horror
- Website: jenevarose.com

Jeneva Rose is an American author best known for her thriller novel The Perfect Marriage.

== Career ==
In 2016, Rose began writing a women's fiction novel titled The Girl I Was. After completing The Girl I Was and having it rejected by publishers, she began writing a thriller titled The Perfect Marriage, which became her first published novel in 2020. Following the success of The Perfect Marriage, she self-published The Girl I Was, which was later acquired by Mira Books and republished in 2025.

In 2022, Zurich Avenue and Picture Perfect Federation acquired film rights to The Perfect Marriage.

On the week of May 4, 2025, The Perfect Divorce reached first place on The New York Times Best Seller Combined Print & E-Book Fiction list.

In 2026, Rose published her first horror novel Sometimes I Scare Myself, a collection of three stories that was partially inspired by her own experiences with postpartum anxiety. On the week of October 11, 2026, Sometimes I Scare Myself reached second place on the Hardcover Fiction NYT best seller list, and sixth place on the Combined Print & E-Book Fiction list.

== Works ==
- The Perfect Marriage (2020)
- Dead Woman Crossing^{‡} (2020)
- Last Day Alive^{‡} (2021)
- The Girl I Was (2021)
- One of Us Is Dead (2022)
- You Shouldn't Have Come Here (2023)
- It's A Date (Again) (2023)
- #CrimeTime (co-written with Drew Pyne, audiobook-only, 2023)
- Home Is Where the Bodies Are (2024)
- The Perfect Divorce (2025)
- Dating After the End of the World (2025)
- Sometimes I Scare Myself: A Collection of Horror (2026)
- Dead Girl Summer (2027)

^{‡}: Previously published with the pen name J.R. Adler.

== Personal life ==
Rose co-wrote #CrimeTime with her husband, Drew Pyne. They live in Wisconsin with their son.
