= The Knight and the Moth =

2025 fantasy novel by Rachel Gillig

- First edition hardcover
- Author: Rachel Gillig
- Cover artist: Lisa Marie Pompilio
- Language: English
- Genre: Romantic fantasy, gothic fiction
- Publisher: Orbit Books
- Publication date: May 20, 2025
- Publication place: United States
- Pages: 400
- ISBN: 9780316582704
- Followed by: The Knave and the Moon

The Knight and the Moth is a gothic romantic fantasy novel by American author Rachel Gillig. It was published by Orbit Books on May 20, 2025.

== Background ==
The novel was inspired by The Outlandish Knight. While not a direct retelling of the tale, it inspired Gillig to explore what knights are and what they are not.

== Synopsis ==
Six is confined to Aisling Cathedral with five other Diviners, revered across Traum for their ability to foretell futures through dreams and water rituals. When a newly crowned king, Benedict Castor III, has his fortune divined, Six meets his knights, including one named Sir Rodrick "Rory" Myndacious, who mocks her belief in the gods. Shortly after, the Diviners start disappearing, until only Six remains. Six flees the cathedral and searches for her fellow Diviners with the help of Rory and a gargoyle. On her journey, she questions everything she has learned about Aisling and develops feelings for Rory.

== Reception ==
The novel was nominated for a Goodreads Choice Award for Romantasy. It debuted at number one on the New York Times Hardcover Fiction Best Seller List, and spent eight weeks on the list.

Eve Stano praised the novel's "eerie" worldbuilding in her review for Library Journal. Publishers Weekly praised the "fresh" premise and "inventive" worldbuilding, but criticised the pacing in the middle of the novel and the late arrival of the romance. Lacy Baugher Milas gave it a 9.0 rating in her review for Paste, praising its "fresh" premise, "vivid" worldbuilding, and "uniquely Gothic" atmosphere.

== Audiobook ==
An unabridged audiobook edition of the novel was released alongside the hardcover and ebook editions by Hachette Audio. It was narrated by Samantha Hydeson, whose narration Kirkus Reviews praised as "immersive". It was nominated for an Audie Award for Fantasy.

== Sequel ==
A sequel, The Knave and the Moon, is set to release on September 1, 2026. Together, they form the Stonewater Kingdom duology.
