= Marie-Helene Bertino =

American novelist

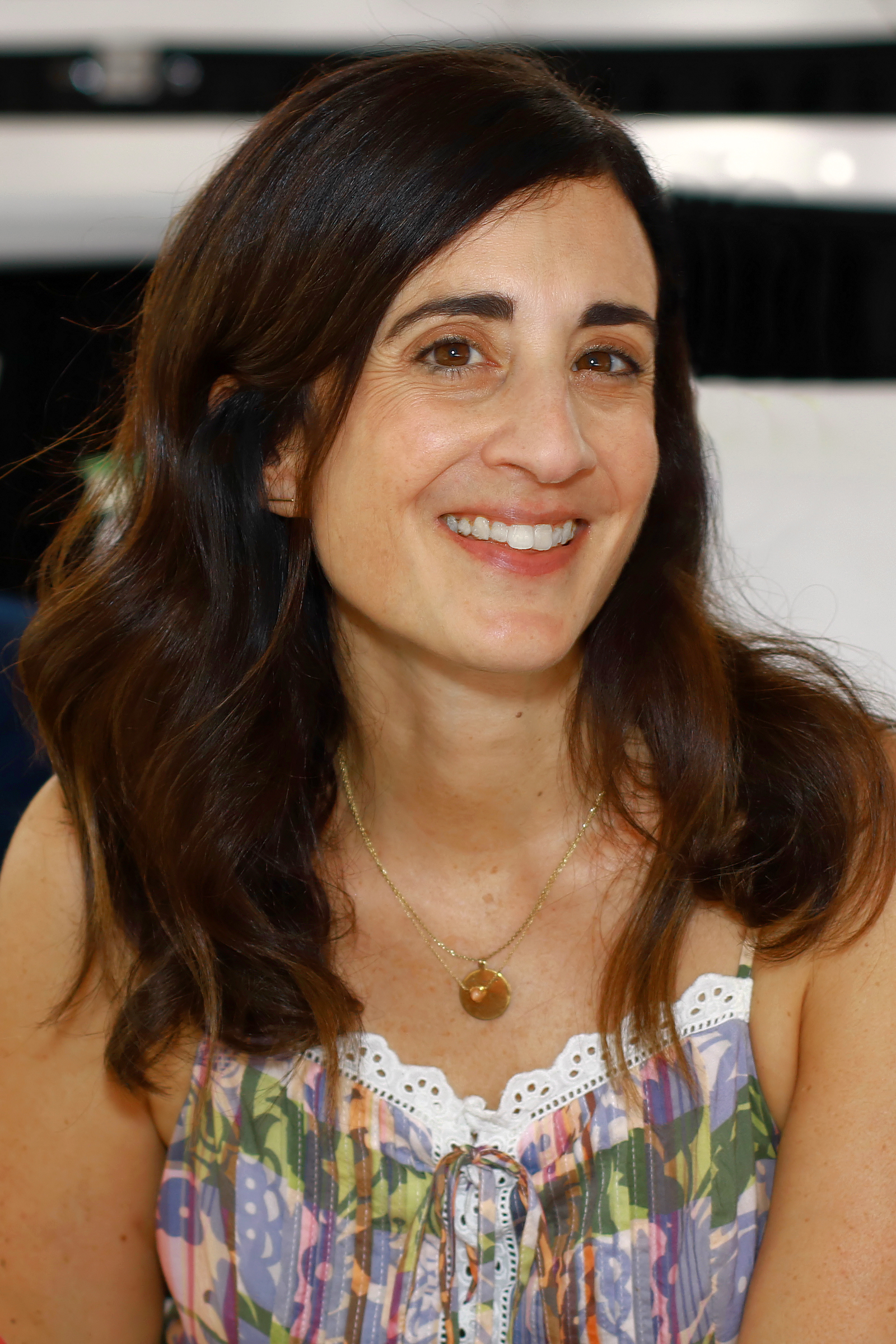
- Born: Northeast Philadelphia, Pennsylvania, U.S.
- Education: Villanova University (BA); Brooklyn College (MFA)
- Occupation: Writer
- Writing career
- Genre: Fiction
- Website: www.mariehelenebertino.com

Marie-Helene Bertino is an American novelist and short story writer. She is the author of three novels, Beautyland (2024), Parakeet (2020) and 2AM at the Cat's Pajamas (2014), and two short story collections: Safe as Houses (2012), and Exit Zero (2025). She has been awarded a Pushcart Prize and an O. Henry Prize for her short stories.

== Biography ==
Marie-Helene Bertino was born and raised in Northeast Philadelphia, Pennsylvania. She is of Italian and French Basque ancestry. She holds a B.A. in English from Villanova University and an M.F.A. from Brooklyn College. After moving to New York City in 2003, Bertino worked for a plaintiff's attorney as a biographer for people living with traumatic brain injury. In 2020, she was the University of Montana MFA Program's Kittredge Visiting Writer. She has also been faculty for the Institute of American Indian Arts' Low Residency M.F.A. Program and the M.A. in Creative Writing at University College Cork, an Associate Editor for One Story, and is an editor-at-large for Catapult. She has named Yōko Ogawa, Edward P. Jones, Toni Morrison, Cormac McCarthy, and Amy Hempel as influences on her work.

She has taught at The New School and New York University. She is currently a lecturer in English at Yale University.

== Writing ==
Bertino's first book of short stories, Safe as Houses, was selected by Jim Shepard as the winner of the 2012 Iowa Short Fiction Prize and was subsequently published by University of Iowa Press. Safe as Houses was long-listed for the 2013 Frank O'Connor International Short Story Award and was named as one of The Story Prize's Outstanding Collections of 2012. Safe as Houses notably includes the story "North Of," in which a woman brings Bob Dylan home for Thanksgiving dinner. "North Of" had previously been awarded a Pushcart Prize and the 2007 Mississippi Review Prize in Fiction. "North Of" has also been anthologized in Mississippi Review 30 and was republished in Electric Literature's Recommended Reading.

2AM at the Cat's Pajamas, her debut novel, was published by Crown in 2014. It was selected as a 2014 Barnes & Noble Discover Great New Writers Pick and was one of NPR's Best Books of 2014.

Her second novel, Parakeet, was published by Farrar, Straus and Giroux in 2020. Parakeet follows an unnamed bride in the weeks leading up to her wedding after she is visited by the ghost of her grandmother, appearing in the form of a parakeet, who tells her to find her estranged sibling. Bertino has noted that the character of the grandmother in Parakeet is modeled after her own grandmother, who was an immigrant from the French Pyrenees. Parakeet was met with critical acclaim upon publication. Parakeet was a New York Times Editors' Choice, a top-ten book of the year at the Huffington Post, and was long-listed for an Andrew Carnegie Medal for Excellence in Fiction and the 2020 Joyce Carol Oates Prize.

Beautyland, Bertino's third novel, was published in January 2024 by Farrar, Straus and Giroux. It was shortlisted for the 'Published Novels' section of the 2025 Comedy Women in Print Prize.

Exit Zero, Bertino's second short story collection was published in 2025,

== Awards and honors ==
- 2007 Mississippi Review Prize in Fiction
- 2009 Pushcart Prize
- 2011 Center for Fiction Fellowship
- 2012 Iowa Short Fiction Award
- 2012 Story Prize Outstanding Collection
- 2014 MacDowell Fellowship
- 2016 O'Henry Prize
- 2016 Walter E. Dakin Fellowship at Sewanee Writers' Conference
- 2020 Kittredge Visiting Writer at the University of Montana
- 2025 Guggenheim Fellowship in Fiction

== Bibliography ==
- Safe as Houses, University of Iowa Press (2012), ISBN 978-1609381141
- 2AM at the Cat's Pajamas, Crown (2014), ISBN 978-0804140232
- Parakeet, Farrar, Straus and Giroux (2020), ISBN 978-0374229450
- Beautyland, Farrar, Straus and Giroux (2024), ISBN 978-0374109288
- Bertino, Marie-Helene (2025-04-22). Exit Zero. FSG Originals. ISBN 978-0-374-61647-2.
