= Jim Krusoe =

American poet

Jim Krusoe is an American novelist, poet, and short story writer. His stories and poems have appeared in Antioch Review, Denver Quarterly, BOMB, Iowa Review, Field, North American Review, American Poetry Review, and Santa Monica Review, which he founded in 1988. His essays and book reviews have appeared in Manoa, the Los Angeles Times Book Review, The New York Times and The Washington Post. He is a recipient of fellowships from the National Endowment of the Arts and the Lila Wallace Reader's Digest Fund. He teaches at Santa Monica College and in the graduate writing program at Antioch University, Los Angeles. His novel Iceland was selected by the Los Angeles Times and the Austin Chronicle as one of the ten best fiction books of 2002, and it was on the Washington Post list of notable fiction for the same year. His novel Girl Factory was published in 2008 by Tin House Books followed by Erased, which was published in 2009 and Toward You published in 2010, also by Tin House Books.

== Bibliography ==
- Blood Lake and Other Stories. Albany, California: Boaz Publishing. 1999. ISBN 978-0-9651879-6-1.
- Iceland. Chicago: Dalkey Archive Press. 2002. ISBN 978-1-56478-314-1.
- Girl Factory. Portland, Oregon: Tin House Books. 2008. ISBN 978-0-9794198-2-9.
- Erased. Portland, Oregon: Tin House Books. 2009. ISBN 978-0-9802436-7-3.
- Toward You. Portland, Oregon: Tin House Books. 2010. ISBN 978-0-9794198-2-9.
- Parsifal. Portland, Oregon: Tin House Books. 2012. ISBN 978-1-935639-34-3.
- The Sleep Garden. Portland, Oregon: Tin House Books. 2016. ISBN 978-1-941040-18-8.
