= List of The New York Times number-one books of 2024 =

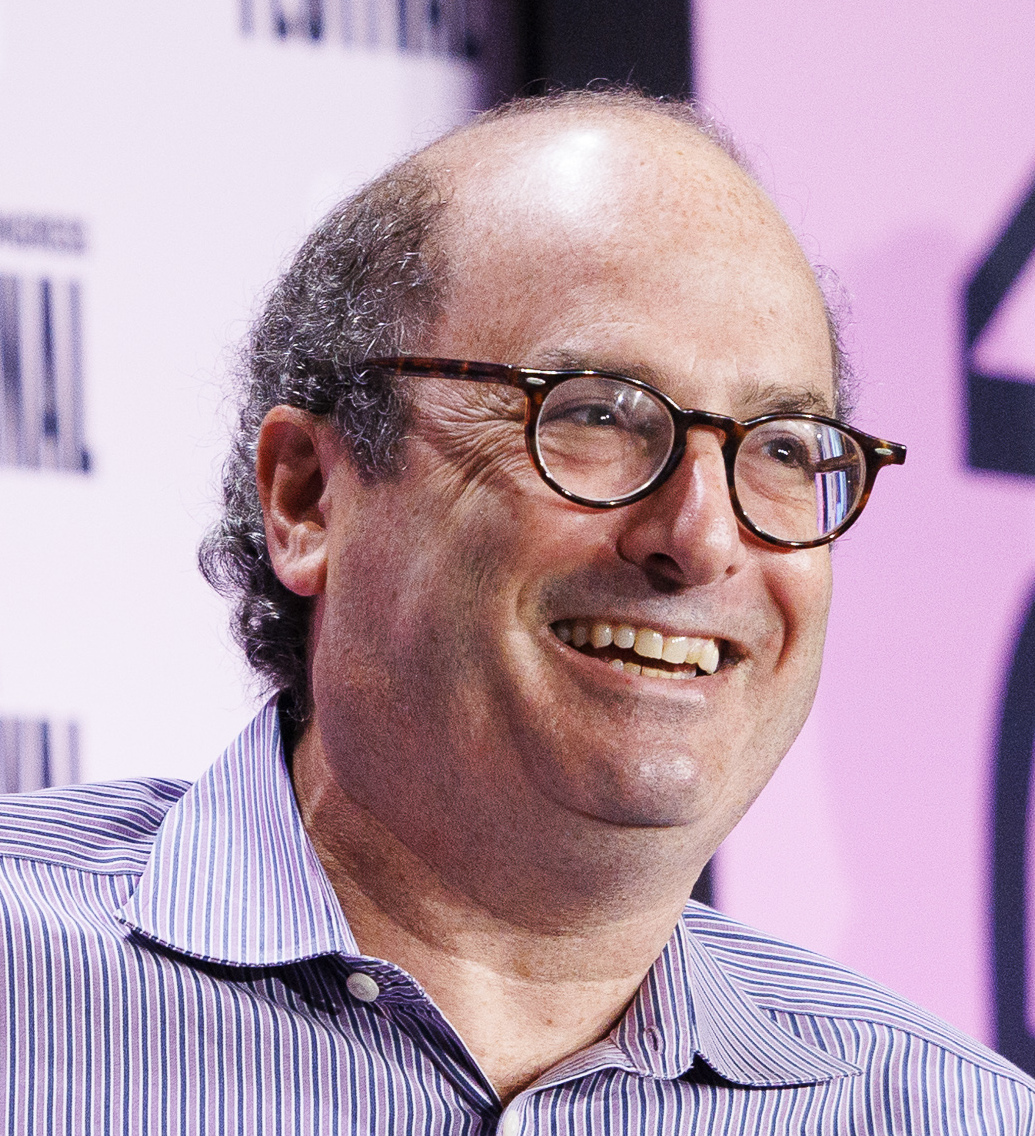
David Grann was the most frequent weekly best-selling combined nonfiction author in 2024.

The American daily newspaper The New York Times publishes multiple weekly lists ranking the best-selling books in the United States. The lists are split into three genres—fiction, nonfiction and children's books. Both the fiction and nonfiction lists are further split into multiple lists.

== Fiction ==
The following list ranks the number-one best-selling fiction books, in the combined print and e-books category.

The most frequent weekly best seller of the year was The Women by Kristin Hannah with 10 weeks at the top of the list, followed by Fourth Wing by Rebecca Yarros with 6 weeks at the top of the list and It Ends with Us by Colleen Hoover with 5 weeks at the top of the list.

Issue date	Title	Author(s)	Publisher	Ref.
January 7	Fourth Wing	Rebecca Yarros	Red Tower Books	
January 14	Fourth Wing	Rebecca Yarros	Red Tower Books	
January 21	Fourth Wing	Rebecca Yarros	Red Tower Books	
January 28	Fourth Wing	Rebecca Yarros	Red Tower Books	
February 4	Fourth Wing	Rebecca Yarros	Red Tower Books	
February 11	Random in Death	J. D. Robb	St. Martin's Press	
February 18	House of Flame and Shadow	Sarah J. Maas	Bloomsbury Publishing	
February 25	The Women	Kristin Hannah	St. Martin's Press	
March 3	The Women	Kristin Hannah	St. Martin's Press	
March 10	The Women	Kristin Hannah	St. Martin's Press	
March 17	The Women	Kristin Hannah	St. Martin's Press	
March 24	The Women	Kristin Hannah	St. Martin's Press	
March 31	The Women	Kristin Hannah	St. Martin's Press	
April 7	The Women	Kristin Hannah	St. Martin's Press	
April 14	The Women	Kristin Hannah	St. Martin's Press	
April 21	Just for the Summer	Abby Jimenez	Forever	
April 28	Toxic Prey	John Sandford	G. P. Putnam's Sons	
May 5	A Calamity of Souls	David Baldacci	Grand Central Publishing	
May 12	Funny Story	Emily Henry	Berkley	
May 19	King of Sloth	Ana Huang	Bloom Books	
May 26	The 24th Hour	James Patterson and Maxine Paetro	Little, Brown and Company	
June 2	Think Twice	Harlan Coben	Grand Central Publishing	
June 9	You Like It Darker	Stephen King	Scribner	
June 16	Camino Ghosts	John Grisham	Doubleday	
June 23	Eruption	Michael Crichton and James Patterson	Little, Brown and Company	
June 30	The Housemaid Is Watching	Freida McFadden	Poisoned Pen Press	
July 7	Red Sky Mourning	Jack Carr	Emily Bestler Books	
July 14	The Women	Kristin Hannah	St. Martin's Press	
July 21	The Women	Kristin Hannah	St. Martin's Press	
July 28	A Death in Cornwall	Daniel Silva	Harper	
August 4	The Black Bird Oracle	Deborah Harkness	Ballantine Books	
August 11	It Ends with Us	Colleen Hoover	Atria Books	
August 18	It Ends with Us	Colleen Hoover	Atria Books	
August 25	It Ends with Us	Colleen Hoover	Atria Books	
September 1	It Ends with Us	Colleen Hoover	Atria Books	
September 8	It Ends with Us	Colleen Hoover	Atria Books	
September 15	Daydream	Hannah Grace	Atria Books	
September 22	Passions in Death	J. D. Robb	St. Martin's Press	
September 29	Somewhere Beyond the Sea	TJ Klune	Tor Books	
October 6	Fourth Wing	Rebecca Yarros	Red Tower Books	
October 13	Counting Miracles	Nicholas Sparks	Random House	
October 20	The Boyfriend	Freida McFadden	Poisoned Pen Press	
October 27	The Boyfriend	Freida McFadden	Poisoned Pen Press	
November 3	The Waiting	Michael Connelly	Little, Brown and Company	
November 10	In Too Deep	Lee Child and Andrew Child	Delacorte Press	
November 17	The Grey Wolf	Louise Penny	Minotaur Books	
November 24	Hexed	Emily McIntire	Bloom Books	
December 1	To Die For	David Baldacci	Grand Central Publishing	
December 8	The Mirror	Nora Roberts	St. Martin's Press	
December 15	Wicked	Gregory Maguire	William Morrow	
December 22	Wind and Truth	Brandon Sanderson	Tor Books	
December 29	James	Percival Everett	Doubleday	

== Nonfiction ==
The following list ranks the number-one best-selling nonfiction books, in the combined print and e-books category.

The most frequent weekly best seller of the year was Killers of the Flower Moon by David Grann with 6 weeks at the top of the list, followed closely by The Anxious Generation by Jonathan Haidt, The Demon of Unrest of Erik Larson and Melania by Melania Trump with 5 weeks at the top of the list. David Grann was also the most frequent weekly best-selling author with 8 weeks at the top of the list.

Issue date	Title	Author(s)	Publisher	Ref.
January 7	The Wager	David Grann	Doubleday	
January 14	The Wager	David Grann	Doubleday	
January 21	The Boys in the Boat	Daniel James Brown	Penguin Books	
January 28	Oath and Honor	Liz Cheney	Little, Brown and Company	
February 4	Killers of the Flower Moon	David Grann	Doubleday	
February 11	Killers of the Flower Moon	David Grann	Doubleday	
February 18	Killers of the Flower Moon	David Grann	Doubleday	
February 25	Killers of the Flower Moon	David Grann	Doubleday	
March 3	Killers of the Flower Moon	David Grann	Doubleday	
March 10	Killers of the Flower Moon	David Grann	Doubleday	
March 17	Blood Money	Peter Schweizer	Harper	
March 24	The House of Hidden Meanings	RuPaul	Dey Street Books	
March 31	Blood Money	Peter Schweizer	Harper	
April 7	Get It Together	Jesse Watters	Broadside Books	
April 14	The Anxious Generation	Jonathan Haidt	Penguin Press	
April 21	The Anxious Generation	Jonathan Haidt	Penguin Press	
April 28	Somehow	Anne Lamott	Riverhead Books	
May 5	An Unfinished Love Story	Doris Kearns Goodwin	Simon & Schuster	
May 12	The Anxious Generation	Jonathan Haidt	Penguin Press	
May 19	The Demon of Unrest	Erik Larson	Crown	
May 26	The Demon of Unrest	Erik Larson	Crown	
June 2	The Situation Room	George Stephanopoulos with Lisa Dickey	Grand Central Publishing	
June 9	What This Comedian Said Will Shock You	Bill Maher	Simon & Schuster	
June 16	The Demon of Unrest	Erik Larson	Crown	
June 23	The War on Warriors	Pete Hegseth	Broadside Books	
June 30	The Demon of Unrest	Erik Larson	Crown	
July 7	On Call	Anthony Fauci	Viking	
July 14	On Call	Anthony Fauci	Viking	
July 21	The Demon of Unrest	Erik Larson	Crown	
July 28	The Anxious Generation	Jonathan Haidt	Penguin Press	
August 4	Hillbilly Elegy	J. D. Vance	Harper	
August 11	Hillbilly Elegy	J. D. Vance	Harper	
August 18	Hillbilly Elegy	J. D. Vance	Harper	
August 25	Hillbilly Elegy	J. D. Vance	Harper	
September 1	Shameless	Brian Tyler Cohen	Harper	
September 8	Imminent	Luis Elizondo	William Morrow	
September 15	The Anxious Generation	Jonathan Haidt	Penguin Press	
September 22	Lovely One	Ketanji Brown Jackson	Random House	
September 29	Confronting the Presidents	Bill O'Reilly and Martin Dugard	St. Martin's Press	
October 6	Something Lost, Something Gained	Hillary Rodham Clinton	Simon & Schuster	
October 13	The Small and the Mighty	Sharon McMahon	Thesis	
October 20	Be Ready When the Luck Happens	Ina Garten	Crown	
October 27	Melania	Melania Trump	Skyhorse Publishing	
November 3	War	Bob Woodward	Simon & Schuster	
November 10	Framed	John Grisham and Jim McCloskey	Doubleday	
November 17	Melania	Melania Trump	Skyhorse Publishing	
November 24	Melania	Melania Trump	Skyhorse Publishing	
December 1	Melania	Melania Trump	Skyhorse Publishing	
December 8	Cher: The Memoir, Part One	Cher	Dey Street Books	
December 15	Cher: The Memoir, Part One	Cher	Dey Street Books	
December 22	Cher: The Memoir, Part One	Cher	Dey Street Books	
December 29	Melania	Melania Trump	Skyhorse Publishing	

== See also ==
- Publishers Weekly list of bestselling novels in the United States in the 2020s
