= Menti =

Menti may refer to:

- Menți, a village administrated by the town of Strehaia, Romania
- Mentimeter, a company and app from Sweden
