= NSPW =

NSPW may stand for:

- National Society of Pottery Workers, former British trade union
- National Suicide Prevention Week, annual campaign in the United States
