= Ana Huang =

Chinese-American author (born 1991)

- Born: March 7, 1991 (aged 35); United States
- Occupation: Writer
- Writing career
- Years active: 2006-present
- Genres: New adult fiction and romance
- Notable works: If Love series; Twisted Love series; Kings of Sin series; Gods of the Game series
- Website: anahuang.com

Ana Huang is an American author who primarily writes novels in the romance and new adult fiction genres. She is a #1 New York Times and USA Today bestselling author.

== Early life ==
Huang is the daughter of Chinese immigrants. As a child, Huang's mother encouraged her to write stories as a way to practice English as a second language. Later, Huang wrote as a hobby and posted her work on Wattpad. She states that "I wrote my first novel when I was 15, and I uploaded it when I was maybe 18."

Huang studied international relations in college, and during that time, studied abroad in China, as a foreign exchange student in Shanghai.

== Career ==
Huang worked in press relations at a geopolitical consulting company.

After 2019, during the COVID-19 pandemic, Huang began writing and self-publishing novels and promoting them on TikTok. Her Twisted series went viral, and was republished by Bloom Books in 2022.

In 2022, Huang was featured in Cosmopolitan, and in 2023, Elle magazine India, and Good Morning America.

In 2023, her novel King of Greed reached #1 on the Paperback Trade Fiction section of The New York Times Best Seller list. King of Sloth was a #1 New York Times Best Seller, and reached #1 on the USA Today Booklist. Twisted Love stayed on the Paperback Trade Fiction section of The New York Times Best Seller list for 61 weeks.

In 2024, Huang, with 1,474,194 print copies sold, is the fourth highest selling BookTok author.

Huang uses "alpha readers" to fact check topics involved in the telling of her stories.

== Works ==
=== If Love series ===
- If We Ever Meet Again (2020)
- If the Sun Never Sets (2020)
- If Love Had a Price (2020)
- If We Were Perfect (2020)

=== Twisted series ===
- Twisted Love (2021)
- Twisted Games (2021)
- Twisted Hate (2022)
- Twisted Lies (2022)

=== Kings of Sin series ===
- King of Wrath (2022)
- King of Pride (2023)
- King of Greed (2023)
- King of Sloth (2024)
- King of Envy (2025)
- King of Gluttony (2026)
- King of Lust (2027)

=== Gods of the Game series ===
- The Striker (2024)
- The Defender (2025)
- The Keeper (2026)

=== Standalones ===
- All I've Never Wanted (2013)

== Accolades ==
Year	Award	Category	Title	Notes	Result
2022	Goodreads Choice Awards	Goodreads Choice Award for Best Romance	Twisted Hate	Finalist	Nominated
2023	Goodreads Choice Awards	Goodreads Choice Award for Best Romance	King of Pride	Finalist	Nominated
2024	Goodreads Choice Awards	Goodreads Choice Award for Best Romance	King of Sloth	Finalist	Nominated

== See also ==
- New adult fiction
