= Suicide in the United States =

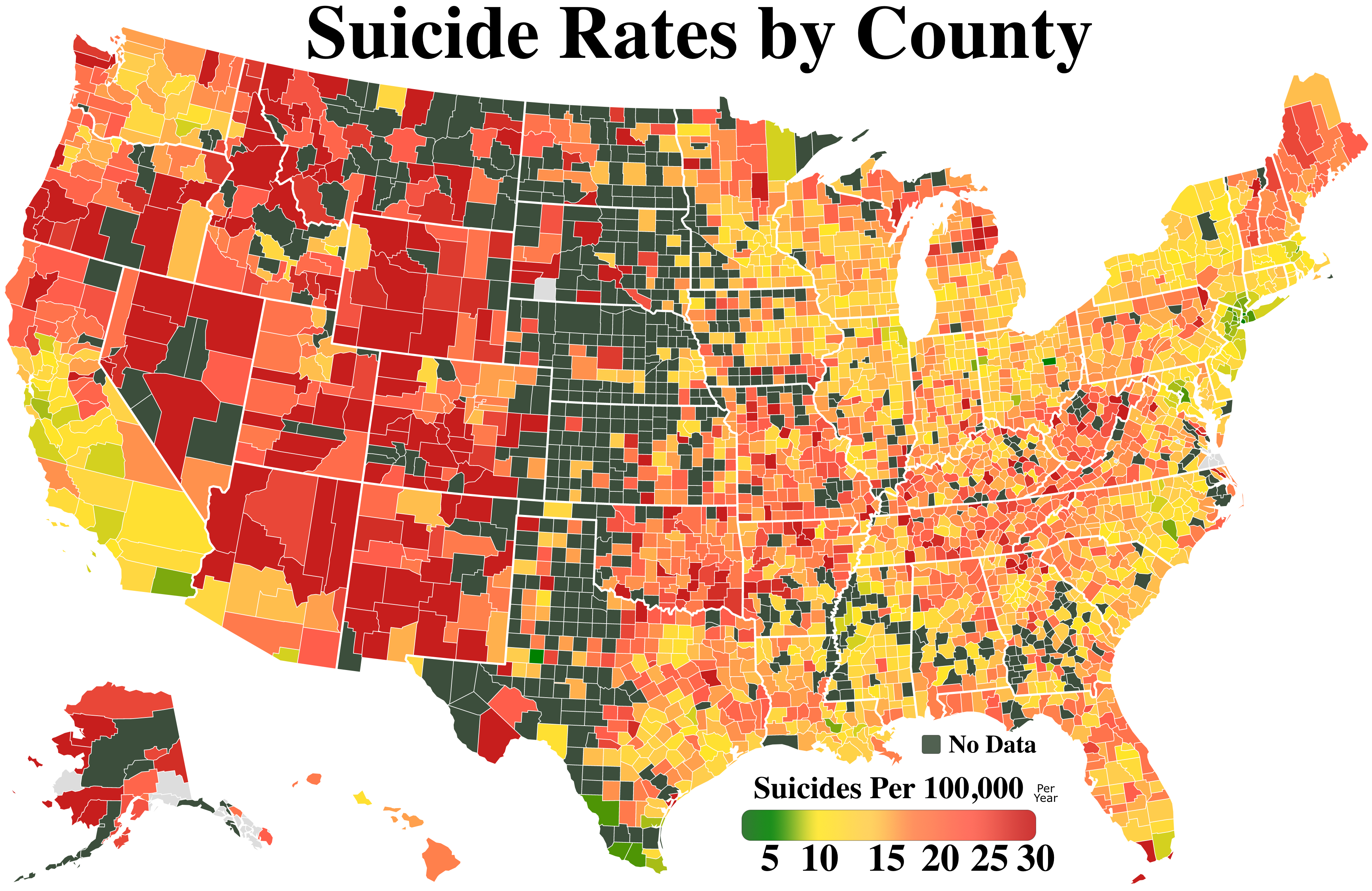
The suicide rate by county, 2016-2020 average rate per 100,000 No data 5 10 15 20 25 30

Suicide is a major national public health issue in the United States. The country has one of the highest suicide rates among wealthy nations. In 2020, there were 45,799 recorded suicides, up from 42,773 in 2014, according to the CDC's National Center for Health Statistics (NCHS). On average, adjusted for age, the annual U.S. suicide rate increased 30% between 2000 and 2020, from 10.4 to 13.5 suicides per 100,000 people. From 2000 to 2020, more than 800,000 people died by suicide in the United States. Males represented 78.7% of all suicides between 2000 and 2020. In 2022, a record high 49,500 people died by suicide. The 2022 rate was the highest level since 1941, at 14.3 per 100,000 persons. This rate was surpassed in 2023, when it increased to over 14.7 per 100,000 persons.

The U.S. government seeks to prevent suicides through its National Strategy for Suicide Prevention, a collaborative effort of the Substance Abuse and Mental Health Services Administration, Centers for Disease Control and Prevention, National Institutes of Health, Health Resources and Services Administration, and the Indian Health Service. Their plan consists of eleven goals aimed at preventing suicides. Older adults are disproportionately likely to die by suicide. Some U.S. jurisdictions have laws against suicide or against assisting suicide. In recent years, there has been increased interest in rethinking these laws.

Suicide has been associated with tough economic conditions, including unemployment rate. There are significant variations in the suicide rates of the different states, ranging from 28.89 per 100,000 people in Montana to 8.11 per 100,000 people in New York. In July 2022, the United States transitioned the National Suicide Hotline from the former 10-digit number into the 988 Suicide & Crisis Lifeline, linking both the National Suicide Hotline, the Veterans Crisis Line, and a network of more than 200 state and local call centers run through SAMHSA, the Substance Abuse and Mental Health Services Administration. In 2022, White males had accounted for 68.46% of suicide deaths in the United States. In the same year, the male suicide rate was approximately four times that of females.

== History ==
Formal tracking of suicide mortality in the United States was not established until the early 1900s. Data preceding this period is limited consisting primarily of incomplete records from a small number of states and years. The highest rates ever recorded occurred during the 1930s, likely due to the economic downturn of the decade, which coincided with the Great Depression. This period saw a peak in 1932, when the rate reached 17.4 to 22.1 deaths per 100,000 people, depending on the statistical model used (crude vs. age-adjusted). Following this peak, rates declined throughout the mid-20th century, with the 1950s and 1960s representing the lowest historical levels. However, while overall rates remained low, suicide among young adults aged 15 to 34 began a steady climb between 1945 and 1992.

In 2015, suicide was the seventh leading cause of death for males and the 14th leading cause of death for females. It was the second leading cause of death for young people aged 10 to 34. From 1999 to 2010, the suicide rate among Americans aged 35 to 64 increased nearly 30 percent. The largest increases were among women aged 60 to 64, with rates rising 60 percent, then men in their fifties, with rates rising nearly 50 percent. In 2008, it was observed that U.S. suicide rates, particularly among middle-aged white women, had increased, although the causes were unclear. As of 2018, about 1.7 percent of all deaths were suicides.

In 2018, 14.2 people per 100,000 died by suicide, the highest rate recorded in more than 30 years. Due to the stigma surrounding suicide, it is suspected that suicide is generally underreported. In April 2016, the CDC released data showing that the suicide rate in the United States had hit a 30-year high. In June 2018, new data showed an increase in every U.S. state except Nevada since 1999.

Surging death rates from suicide, drug overdoses and alcoholism, what researchers refer to as "deaths of despair," are largely responsible for a consecutive three year decline of life expectancy in the US from 2016 to 2019. This constitutes the first three-year drop in life expectancy in the U.S. since the years 1915–1918.

== Trends in suicide attempts ==
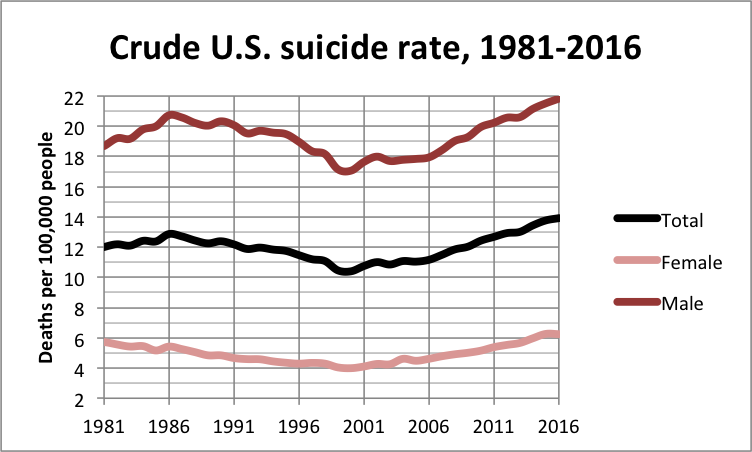
The crude suicide rate in the United States, 1981–2016

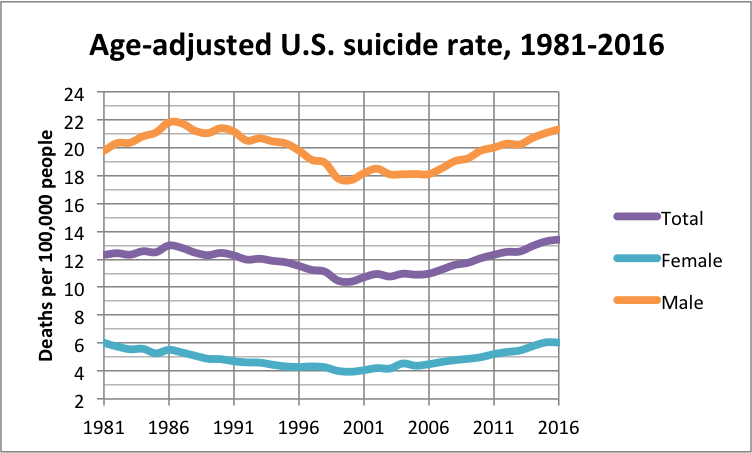
Age-adjusted suicide rate in the United States, 1981–2016

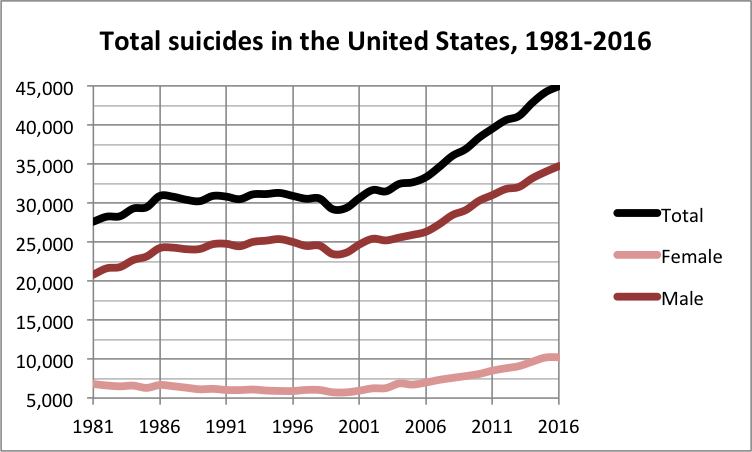
Total suicides in the United States, 1981–2016

The spike in suicide rates in the United States during the 21st century has gained public and clinical attention. A 2016 study found that despite efforts to minimize suicide rates, rates increased by approximately 2% per year from 2006 to 2014. A 2017 national epidemiologic survey of 69,341 US adults found the percentage of adults attempting suicide increased from 0.62% in 2004–2005, to 0.79% in 2012–2013.

Because of this, clinicians aim to determine whether this is a coincident national increase in suicide attempts. In order to achieve this, trends in suicide attempts are characterized among sociodemographic and clinical groups. In 2017, it was found that suicide attempts impact "younger adults with less formal education and those with antisocial personality disorder, anxiety disorders, depressive disorders, and a history of violence" at disproportional rates.

It is important for trends in suicide attempts to be investigated and researched for they help to determine the cause of the increase in suicide rates. Knowing the trends in suicide allows preventive measures to be taken. Suicide prevention is possible through early identification and treatment of individuals deemed high risk. Nearly 50,000 persons died by suicide in 2022, up roughly 2.6% from the previous year.

== Methods ==
In 1860, hanging was the most common method; by 1900, it had shifted to poisoning, and by 1910, firearms have become the primary method.

Though substance overdose is the most common method of attempted suicide in the U.S., guns are the most lethal (most likely to result in death).

A firearm is used in approximately half of suicides, accounting for two-thirds of all firearm deaths. Firearms were used in 56.9% of suicides among males in 2016, making it the most commonly used method by them.

== Suicide as a public health issue ==
For both men and women, gun suicide death rates are positively correlated with states' household gun ownership rates.

A 2023 study concluded that more restrictive state gun policies reduced homicide and suicide gun deaths. From 1991 to 2016—when most states implemented more restrictive gun laws—gun deaths fell sharply.

Suicide prevention has been thought of as the responsibility of mental health professionals within clinical settings between 2000 and 2010. As of 2019, suicide prevention is being recognized as a public health responsibility rather than within clinical settings due to the trend in increasing suicide rates.

From 1960 to 2010, population-based risk reduction approaches have been used for other diseases such as myocardial infarction. As of 2019, an urgency in developing effective suicide prevention has been recognized by the CDC. While suicide is often thought of as an individual problem, suicides may impact families, communities, and society in general. The responsibility of public health would be to develop policies to reduce people's risk of suicidal behavior through addressing factors at the individual to societal levels. "Public health emphasizes efforts to prevent violence (in this case, toward oneself) before it happens. This approach requires addressing factors that put people at risk for, or protect them from, engaging in suicidal behavior."

The CDC has created a National Suicide Prevention Lifeline where they provide free and confidential support for people in distress, prevention and crisis resources for people who are in need of such help, and best practices for professionals. In May 2019, Bloomberg reported that in spite of the recent mental health crisis, insurance companies, including UnitedHealth Group, are doing what they can to limit coverage and deny claims for mental health related issues.

A 2019 study by the National Bureau of Economic Research found a direct causal link between worker's wages and suicide rates, and that raising the minimum wage would result in a quick drop in the suicide rate.

In August 2020, during the COVID-19 pandemic, a survey conducted by the CDC found that 25.5 percent of people aged between 18 and 24 had seriously contemplated suicide within the last 30 days. For the age group 25 to 44, it was 16 percent. Glenn Greenwald of The Intercept said of the findings:

In a remotely healthy society, one that provides basic emotional needs to its population, suicide and serious suicidal ideation are rare events. It is anathema to the most basic human instinct: the will to live. A society in which such a vast swath of the population is seriously considering it as an option is one which is anything but healthy, one which is plainly failing to provide its citizens the basic necessities for a fulfilling life.

== Subgroups ==
=== Age and sex ===
CDC data on suicides by age group, 2015

CDC data on suicide rate by race and gender, 2015

The National Violent Death Reporting System (NVDRS) keeps data on U.S. suicides.

Number of suicides by age group and sex in 2016
Age (years)	10–14	15–24	25–34	35–44	45–54	55–64	65–74	75+	Unknown	All
Males	265	4575	5887	5294	6198	5745	3463	3291	2	34727
Females	171	1148	1479	1736	2239	2014	940	510	1	10238
Male/female ratio	1.5	4.0	4.0	3.0	2.8	2.9	3.7	6.5	2.0	3.4
Total	436	5723	7366	7030	8437	7759	4403	3801	3	44965

Based on the NVDRS 2016 data, The New York Times acknowledged that, among men, those over 65—who make up a smaller proportion of the population—are at greatest risk of death by suicide. The NVDRS 2015 data showed that, among men of all races, men over 65 were the most likely to die of suicides (27.67 suicides per 100,000), closely followed by men 40–64 (27.10 suicides per 100,000). Men 20–39 (23.41 per 100,000) and 15–19 (13.81 per 100,000) were less likely to die of suicides.

The American Foundation for Suicide Prevention reported that in 2016, suicide was the tenth leading cause of death in the U.S., imposing a cost of $69 billion to the US annually. In 2016, middle aged white males were considerably more likely to die than other demographic groups. Native Americans had the highest age-adjusted suicide rate. The suicide rate increased considerably among middle aged white women from 1999 to 2017. In 2024, Black males had a suicide rate four times the rate of Black females.

=== Race ===
In 2021, Native Americans and non-Hispanic White Americans had the highest suicide rate in the United States. In 2021, the CDC reported that suicides have sharply increased among people of color, while the white American suicide rate has decreased. From 2018 to 2021, the suicide rate increased by nearly 20% for African Americans, while the Native American rate increased by 26%. White Americans were the only group in America to experience a decline in suicide rate. The age-adjusted non-Hispanic white suicide rate declined by nearly 4%. In 2006, suicide rates were higher for older white men. By 2021, suicide rates were increasing for Black children. From 2022, the suicide rate of Black youth exceeded that of White youth for the first time. However, white males still account for 60% of suicide deaths in the country. In 2018, whites had the most suicide attempts. In California, blacks have highest suicide rate. Racial discrimination against African Americans has been linked to the increased suicide rate of African Americans. The gun suicide rate among African American children surpassed whites in 2022.

=== By state ===
There are significant variations in the suicide rates of the different states. A number of theories for these differences have been suggested, ranging from socioeconomics (rural poverty) to access to firearms and social isolation (low population densities). A 2011 study found a correlation between altitude above sea level and suicide.

Suicide rate by state (2024)
Rank	State	Suicide rate per 100,000 people
1	Alaska	29.7
2	Wyoming	27.8
3	Montana	26.8
4	New Mexico	24.6
5	South Dakota	21.9
6	Idaho	21.2
7	Oklahoma	20.9
8	Colorado	20.8
9	Oregon	20
10	Nevada	19.6
11	Utah	19.5
12	Maine	19.2
13	North Dakota	19.2
14	Arkansas	19
15	Arizona	18.9
16	Kansas	17.9
17	Kentucky	17.9
18	Missouri	17.1
19	Iowa	16.8
20	Indiana	16.8
21	New Hampshire	16.4
22	Tennessee	16.4
23	West Virginia	16.4
24	South Carolina	16
25	Alabama	15.9
26	Ohio	15.2
27	Mississippi	15.1
28	Nebraska	14.9
29	Wisconsin	14.8
30	Vermont	14.7
31	Washington	14.5
32	Georgia	14.3
33	Texas	14.2
34	Louisiana	14.1
35	North Carolina	14.1
36	Florida	13.9
37	Hawaii	13.7
38	Michigan	13.7
39	Minnesota	13.7
40	Pennsylvania	13.3
41	Virginia	12.9
42	Delaware	11.8
43	Illinois	10.8
44	Connecticut	10
45	Maryland	9.7
46	California	9.6
47	Rhode Island	8.9
48	Massachusetts	8.3
49	New York	8.1
50	New Jersey	6.7
51	District of Columbia	5.7

=== College students ===
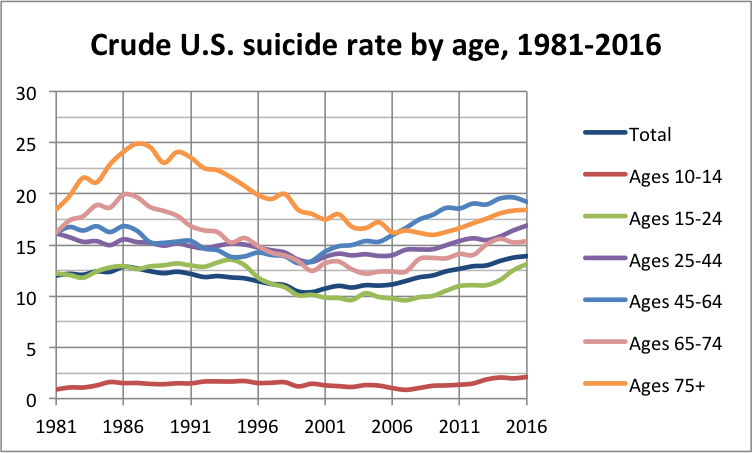
Crude suicide rate in the United States by age, 1981–2016

In 2006, for college students, suicide was the second highest cause of death. The risk tends to be underestimated, as many falsely believe that young people do not have thoughts about suicide. In 2014, the suicide rate for male students was about three times higher than that of female students.

The study of suicide rates and trends was not common in the past, but it gained more attention in 2019. From 1990 to 2004, about 1,404 college students died by suicide. This is about 6.5 percent of those who died by suicide nationwide. In 2014, the adjusted age rate was higher for male students than female students. The suicide rate for males was 20.7 per 100,000 while the rate for females was 5.8 per 100,000.

While counseling services can help prevent suicide, resource availability may be insufficient. Students who do not go to counseling services are 18 times more at risk of suicide compared to those who do. If a college student has any suicidal thoughts, it is always critical to let others, such as members of the school, family, or friends know.

=== Occupation ===
==== Military ====
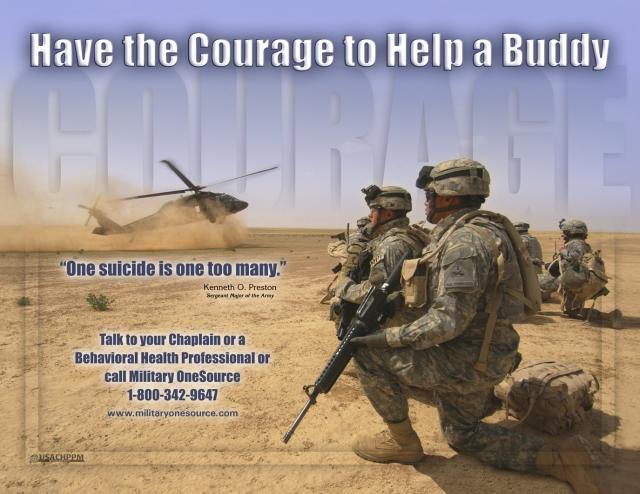
A United States Army suicide prevention poster

A 2009 U.S. Army report indicates military veterans have double the suicide rate of non-veterans. More active-duty soldiers have died from suicide than in combat in the Iraq War (2003–2011) and War in Afghanistan (2001-2021). In 2008, Colonel Carl Castro, director of military operational medical research for the Army noted "there needs to be a cultural shift in the military to get people to focus more on mental health and fitness."

In 2012, the US Army reported 185 suicides among active-duty troops, exceeding the number of combat deaths in that year (176). This figure has significantly increased since 2001, when the number of suicides was 52.

According to a June 2021 study published by Brown University's Cost of War Project, deaths from suicide among active U.S. military personnel and veterans of the post-9/11 conflicts outnumber combat deaths for those same conflicts by four times, with the numbers being 30,177 and 7,057 respectively. According to a study published by the Defense Health Agency, from 2014 to 2019, US soldiers were nearly nine times more likely to die by suicide than by enemy fire.

==== Healthcare workers ====
In 2023, the yearly suicide rate per 100,000 person-years varied between 21.4 for health care support workers, 16 for registered nurses, 15.6 for health technicians, and 13.1 for physicians, according to Columbia University researchers, compared to 12.6 for non-health care professionals.

Suicide rates among veterinarians are a growing problem: in 2019, the suicide rate among male veterinarians was twice the national average, and among female veterinarians the suicide rate was 3.5 times the national average.

=== LGBTQ ===
In 2010, attempted suicide rates for lesbian, gay, bisexual, transgender and queer (LGBTQ) youth and adults in the U.S. were higher than national rates. A 2017 study by the CDC with the help of Johns Hopkins University, Harvard University, and Boston Children's Hospital found that suicide rates dropping in certain states has been linked to the legalization of same sex marriage in those same states. Suicide rates as a whole fell about 7%, but the rates among specifically gay, lesbian, and bisexual teenagers fell by 14%.

In 2023, according to a Centers for Disease Control and Prevention report, nearly half of LGBTQ students said they had seriously considered suicide.

=== Health or disability ===
A 2017 study found that patients with chronic pain are twice as likely to attempt suicide compared with those without chronic pain.

A 2017 study found very high rates of suicide in people with autism spectrum disorders, including high functioning autism and what was formerly known as Asperger syndrome. Autism and particularly Asperger syndrome are highly associated with clinical depression. As many as 30 percent or more of people with Asperger syndrome have depression.

A 2019 study found that those with ADHD are 3–5 times more likely to die by suicide. A 2013 study found that a comorbidity of depression with ADHD is the best predictor of suicidal thoughts in adolescence.

== Murder–suicide ==
There have been many high-profile incidents in the United States in the 1990s, 2000s and 2010s of individuals killing others before killing themselves or expecting to be killed by law enforcement ("suicide by cop"). Examples include the 1999 Columbine High School massacre, the 2007 Virginia Tech massacre, the 2010 Austin plane crash, the 2012 Sandy Hook Elementary School shooting, the 2014 Isla Vista killings, and the 2017 Las Vegas shooting.

== Comparison between countries ==
The US has had the largest number of gun-related suicides in the world every year from 1990 to at least 2019.

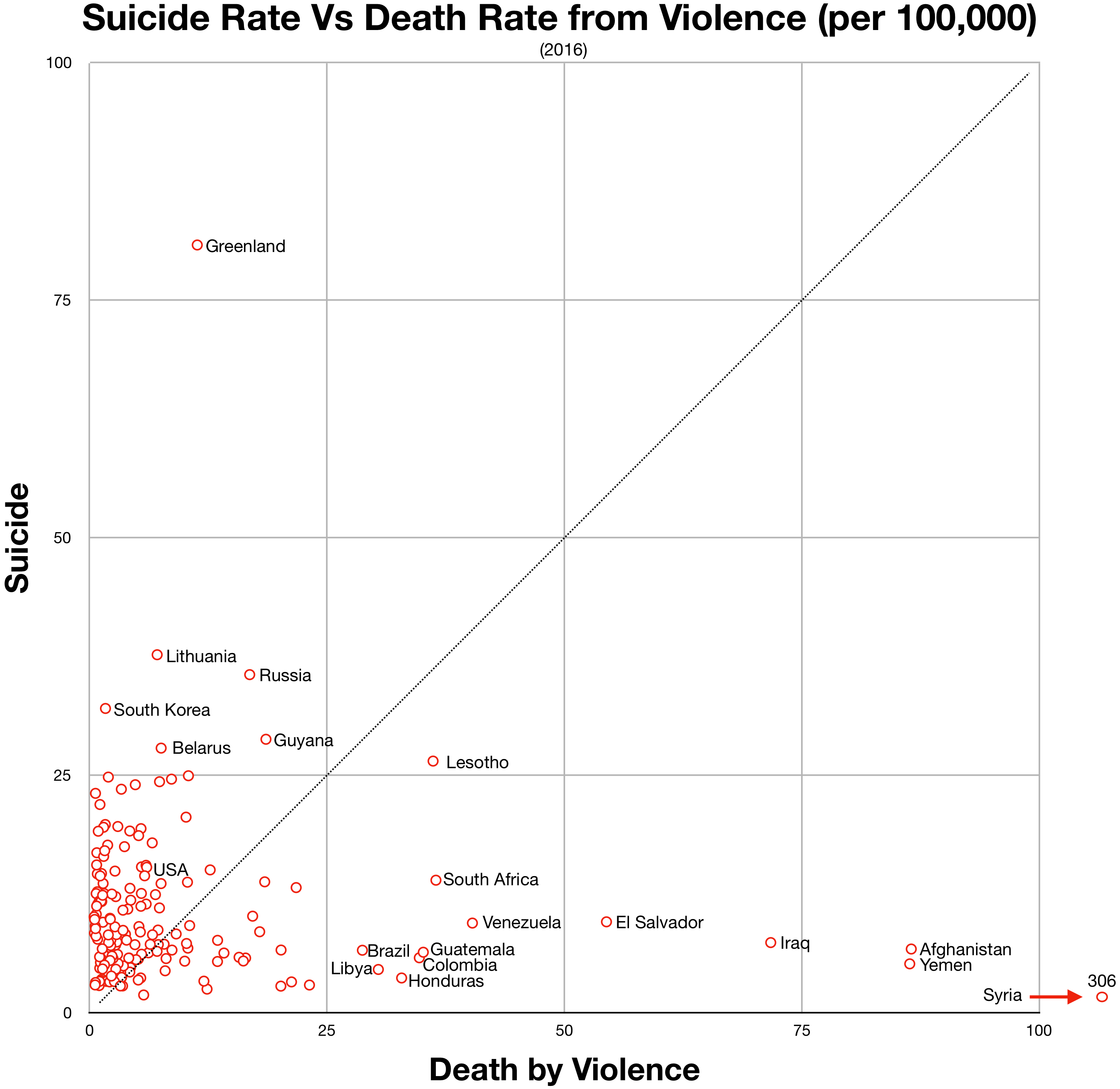
Suicide vs violent deaths 2016

== See also ==
- Assisted suicide in the United States
- Euthanasia in the United States
- National Suicide Prevention Week
- Suicide among Native Americans in the United States
- Teenage suicide in the United States

International:

- List of countries by suicide rate
