= Mobile phone use in schools =

The Effects of Cell Phone Use on Student Attention and Learning

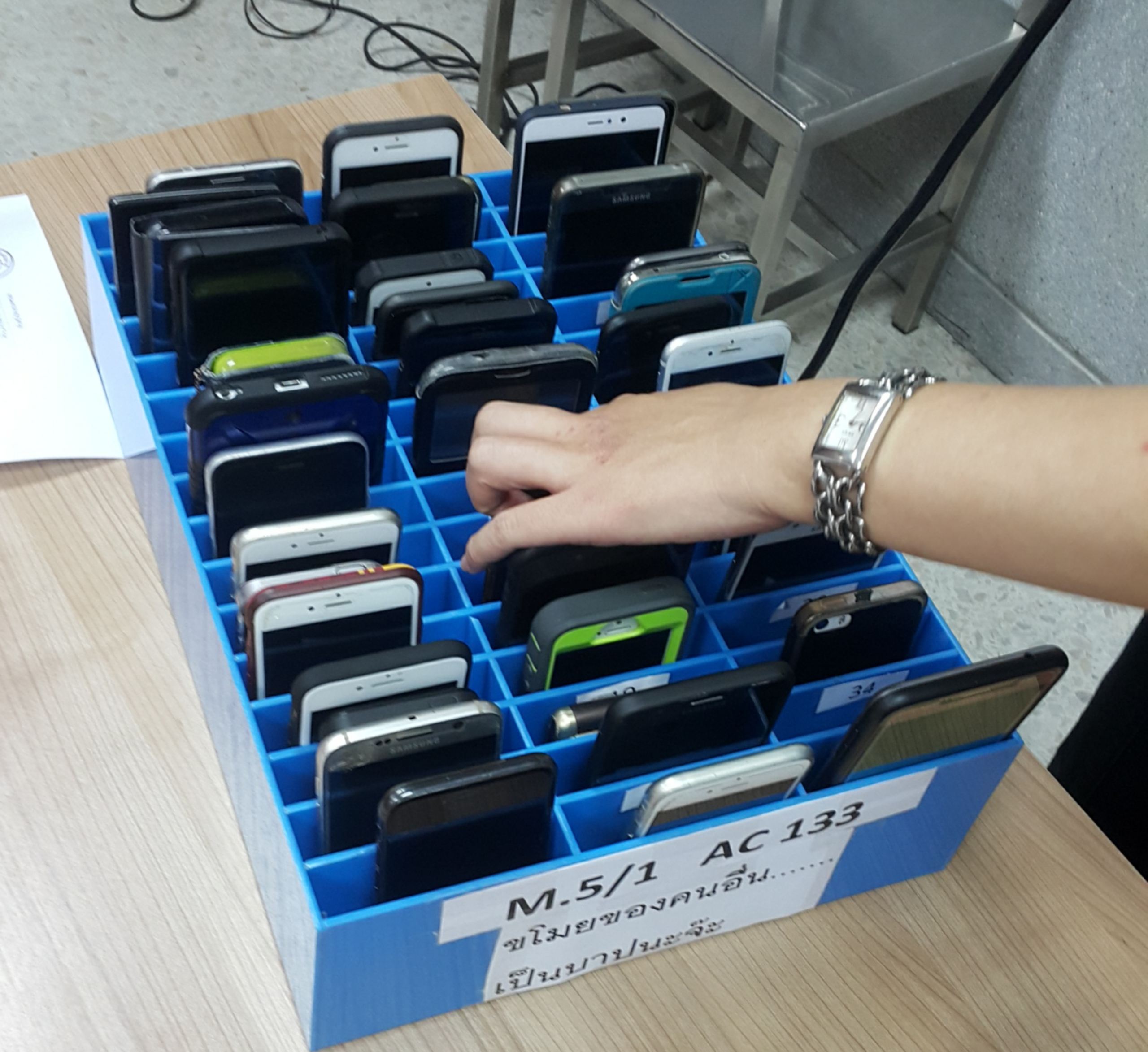
A phone "cage" used for keeping student phones away from them during school hours in a Thai high school

The use of mobile phones in schools has become a controversial topic debated by students, parents, teachers and authorities.

People who support the use of mobile phones believe that these phones are useful for safety, allowing children to communicate with their parents and guardians, and for teaching children at an early age how to work with new media. They argue that mobile phones, since they allow people to access vast amounts of information and render obsolete the need to memorize facts. allow schools to shift their focus from imparting rote facts to critical thinking and personal development.

Opponents of students using mobile phones during school believe that mobile phones are the main source of declining mental health among adolescents, hampering social development, and enabling cyber bullies.

Different countries across the world have had to respond to the increasing presence of mobile devices in schools and weigh the potential harms and benefits, all while maintaining their privacy laws. To prevent distractions caused by mobile phones, many schools have strict policies that forbid students from using their phones during school hours. These regulations are monitored by the Global Education Monitoring Report at UNESCO on a regular basis starting with the 2023 GEM Report on Technology in Education: A tool in whose terms? through the GEM Report PEER profiles on technology. The percentage of countries with bans on the use of phones in schools rose from 23% to 40% from 2023 to 2024 and to 58% in 2026

Some administrators have attempted cell phone jamming to monitor and restrict phone usage, with the intention of limiting distractions and unproductive usage. However, these methods of regulation raise concerns about privacy violation and abuse of power, as well as being illegal in certain jurisdictions.

== Cell phone use in schools in the media ==
The issue of cell phone use in classrooms has garnered significant attention in the media, especially as debates around technology in education intensify. Media outlets often highlight how schools and educators are grappling with this challenge, particularly as smartphones become very common among students. Various methods to tackle cell phone use in classrooms have been featured, ranging from strict bans to more flexible approaches aimed at reducing distractions while maintaining students' access to technology. Some reports focus on how teachers implement "phone-free" policies, requiring students to place their phones in designated areas during lessons. Other educators highlight the use of "phone jails" or phone holders at the front of classrooms, where students deposit their devices upon entering. Meanwhile, some teachers have adopted a middle ground approach, offering "cell phone breaks" midway through class to allow students brief moments to check their devices, while still maintaining focus during instructional time. These solutions are often discussed in online forums and social media platforms like TikTok and Instagram where teachers share their experiences and strategies for balancing technology use with classroom engagement.

In various TV shows and films, the theme of teachers managing cell phone distractions is explored either as a subplot or comedic element. For example, in Community (Season 1, Episode 8), the group at Greendale Community College faces a new, strict rule about using cell phones in class, humorously highlighting the tension between technology and learning. Similarly, The Angry Birds Movie 2 (2019) features characters struggling with tech distractions, mirroring real-world issues teachers face with student devices.

Other notable portrayals include The Fosters (Season 3, Episode 13), where teachers navigate the impact of social media and cell phones on students' attention, and Boy Meets World, which touches on the broader theme of school-related distractions, with more recent spin-offs like Girl Meets World directly addressing the challenges of cell phone use in modern classrooms. British drama Class (2016) also explores technology's disruptive effect in the classroom, though with a more fantastical twist, while Glee (Season 2, Episode 3) touches on the distractions caused by personal lives and cell phones in a school setting. Films like Freedom Writers (2007) and Bad Teacher (2011) also show technology, including cell phones, as one of the many distractions that complicate the teaching environment, even if it is not the main focus of the storyline.

== General consensus on cell phone use among educators ==
The general consensus among educators, particularly high school teachers, reflects growing concerns about the negative impact of cell phone use on students’ focus, academic performance, and mental health. On platforms like TikTok and Instagram, educators frequently share their classroom policies on managing phones, offering insights into various strategies that aim to minimize disruptions. Many teachers express frustration over having to "police" phone use in addition to their regular duties, and a growing number advocate for uniform district-wide policies to address the issue more effectively. For instance, the Santa Barbara Unified School District (SBUSD) implemented a district-wide policy in the 2024–25 school year that requires high school students to place their phones in designated "cellphone hotels" before class begins. Some schools have adopted purpose-built phone storage cabinets with individual-keyed compartments, available in formats including wall-mounted acrylic units and signal-blocking Faraday-lined lockers. This policy ensures that devices are out of reach and out of sight during instructional time.

Educators' concerns are supported by data showing the negative impact of constant notifications and the addictive nature of smartphones. A 2023 survey by Common Sense Media found that the average student receives hundreds of notifications daily, with many occurring during school hours. A 2024 National Education Association (NEA) poll revealed that 90% of teachers support banning phones during instructional time, with 75% favoring restrictions for the entire school day. Teachers highlight how social media and entertainment apps like Netflix and FaceTime are major distractions, with students often checking their phones for updates, leading to a lack of engagement in lessons. The "cellphone hotel" strategy, increasingly adopted across the country, reflects an effort to create a more focused learning environment. In places like Red Bank, New Jersey, and Santa Barbara, California, this approach has expanded into district-wide policies, with positive feedback from educators about improved engagement and reduced stress. However, while the policies have been successful in some cases, challenges remain. Some teachers report a decline in adherence over time, with students finding ways to bypass the rules. Despite this, educators generally agree that stricter, more consistent policies are necessary to address the ongoing challenges of cell phone use in the classroom, particularly as the presence of smartphones continues to grow among younger generations.

== Effects on Learning Outcomes ==
=== Benefits ===
An increase in access to technological devices could develop workplace skills such as rapid searching, browsing, assessing quality, and synthesizing large quantities of information. In addition to helping develop 21st century skills, mobile phones may provide access to a wide variety of mobile apps useful to both teachers and students in the classroom.

Surveys from leading tech experts suggest that there will be both positives and negatives associated with allowing mobile phones in the classroom. Specifically, 55% of those surveyed agree that there will be learning behavior changes that generally produce positive outcomes such as improved problem-solving abilities. While potential issues such as the need for instant gratification were acknowledged, many were optimistic that the negatives could be overcome. Classrooms adapting to the changes in technology was identified as one of the key steps in avoiding negative consequences in the classroom. One researcher at Fast Future, David Saer, stated that the desire for instantaneous content can be seen as a new perspective on timetables rather than a lack of patience. Kids seem to want to do something, such as using phones, more if you restrict it.

In 2017, Dr. James Derounian conducted a study involving a hundred participants at the University of Gloucestershire. His study revealed that 45% of students believe that the use of phones in classrooms supports their education. One of the most commonly mentioned ways that phones provided such academic support was digital access to textbooks. The ability to access scholarly material on mobile devices allowed students to engage more deeply with the information presented. Still, Derounian mentioned that there could be "an element of social desirability conveyed in the student views given."

=== Drawbacks ===
A 2015 study published in the journal Computers in Human Behavior demonstrated that among undergraduate students total usage of mobile phones, measured in number of minutes per day and not limited to school time, was "a significant and negative predictor of college students' academic performance, objectively measured as cumulative GPA." Moreover, the abundant use of mobile technology among young people largely explains the inadequate use of information and communication technologies (ICT) in both personal and school environments. Consequently, actions have been taken that contribute to more responsible use of this type of technology in students' personal, school, and social lives.

Research found that college students spent an average of more than 20 minutes per class using their smartphones. The study also found that frequent phone use was associated with lower grades and interruptions in students' attention during class.

In 2015, Dakota Lawson and Bruce B. Henderson performed a study to examine the relationship between mobile phone use in class and information comprehension. The study involved 120 students from an introductory psychology course, mostly first-year students. The result showed that students who were texting in the class had significantly lower test scores even when the material that was presented was simple: mobile phone use in class impairs students' comprehension and performance. This study was performed after several similar studies in the past and corroborated their results.

Furthermore, researchers Julia Irwin and Natasha Gupta of Macquarie University performed an experiment in 2016 testing the effect of Facebook-related distractions in the classroom. The researchers found that students who were interested in the subject material and the way it was presented were less likely to be distracted by Facebook. However, the students with access to phones still performed poorer than students that were not allowed access to cell phones during the lecture.

A 2017 collective study, published by Applied Cognitive Psychology, indicated that college students retained less knowledge when allowed to use or possess a cell phone during lectures. During the experiment, students who were not allowed access to a cell phone tested better than those who had access to cell phones.

It is argued that, in the classroom, phones can be a constant disruption and may be used inappropriately, such as by cheating on tests, taking inappropriate photographs, and playing mobile games. Phones would also be a distraction, taking away attention that should be going to the teacher. In 2023, the United States surgeon general issued an advisory warning that social media can carry a profound risk of harm to the mental health and well-being of children and adolescents.

Research taken from the National College Health Assessment shows that almost twice as many undergraduate students were diagnosed with anxiety and depression between 2008 and 2018. In his book, The Anxious Generation, Social Psychologist Dr. Jonathan Haidt proposes that a combination of overprotective parents and increased cell phone use are both causes for the increase in mental illness, especially amongst younger generations. His work details how young students are not being properly prepared for the social and emotional dangers of social media and how these relationships are not as fulfilling as real world encounters. The popularity of this book has inspired school board leader and educational administrators across the country.

An article by Emma Henderson, a journalist for the United Kingdom (UK) publication The Independent, describes phantom vibrations caused by "learned bodily behavior," where the part of the body to which the phone is closest becomes very sensitive. As a result, even the slightest vibrations can cause a person to believe that the phone has vibrated when, in reality, it has not. These are known as phantom vibrations. Nine out of ten people claimed to have felt these phantom vibrations in their pockets, raising serious concerns about the overuse of cell phones and the resulting dependency that people develop. Therefore, breaking the habit of frequently checking one's phone can not only be beneficial for students but also convey more respect towards the professors and teachers whose lectures are constantly interrupted by cellular distractions.

== Regulations by country ==
=== Afghanistan ===
In June 2025, Taliban leader Hibatullah Akhundzada called officials and scholars to reduce the use of mobile phones. On June 18, a directive by the provincial education department in Kandahar Province banned the use of mobile phones by students, teachers and administrative staff in all schools and madrasas to "stop the destruction of the future generation". While some students praised the ban as improving focus on studies, some others also raised concerns about learning. The prohibition was in line with the Taliban's efforts to curb the use of digital tools such as restricting images of living people and government officials disconnecting from online messaging apps.

=== Argentina ===
Starting from August 8, 2024, the city of Buenos Aires banned the use of mobile phones by students to promote attention during class hours and socialization during breaks. In primary schools, students may bring mobile phones to school but the use will not be allowed during class or recess. In secondary schools, mobile phones would be stored in a container and schools can define restrictions during breaks and lunch. The ban came with a guide sent to families on mobile phone use.

=== Australia ===
In Australian schools, mobile phones are advised to be used only in case of calls to parents or guardians and that only if the parent or guardian allows the phone to be used to during school activities such as school excursions, camps and extra-curricular activities at school.

Mobile phones with cameras are restricted within school premises while entirely banned within certain sections such as changing rooms, bathrooms, gyms and swimming pools. They are only allowed to film or take photographs of people only with their signed permission or, if the person is under eighteen, to have a parent or guardian to give a sign permission note allowing for these actions. If a student is found with a mobile phone or devices within these areas, they will be confiscated; and, depending on the situation, charges or consequences will be given.

Mobile phones are not allowed to be used for sending harassing or threatening messages. If a student does commit such an act, higher authorities will become involved, including the police since this being a violation of privacy and harassment. Due to bullying, privacy and harassment issues being a major issue in Australia, if a student or teacher does break this law, it may leave them with a criminal record, leaving them at a disadvantage in the future.

Mobile phones are discouraged in terms of their use within the classroom unless they can be appropriately incorporated into the learning environment. Former Premier of New South Wales Gladys Berejiklian stated in an ABC news article that the policy was intended to "ensure mobile phones and other smart devices complement students' learning".

Australian educational institutes have been divided on whether phones should be completely banned in classrooms or only allowed for certain amounts of time during school hours. Since 2019, the New South Wales government has banned phones completely from its primary schools. In a public statement justifying the policy, Berejiklian declared that the ban would encourage children to avoid using technology that could "upset them or make them feel uncomfortable". In 2020, the Victorian Department of Education similarly barred the use of mobile phones in all public schools, both primary and secondary.

The reason for banning phones is to stop bullying both online and physically and to remove distractions from the classrooms. "Mobile phones, unfortunately, are not only distracting but also causing stress for young children—and we can't have that continue," NSW Premier Gladys Berejiklian told Seven's Sunrise. This will be implemented by removing students’ access to phones during the day unless a parent or guardian requests that the student needs to use it. The teacher will always have the phone kept with him somewhere where the student is still able to access it before and after school.

==== High school restrictions ====
While mobile phones are already banned in classrooms without teacher permission and banned in primary schools nationwide, mobile phone bans or restrictions in high schools (secondary schools) during lunch and recess breaks and during free time have become a highly controversial issue and laws vary in each state and territory, as well as by school. While proponents of bans and restrictions suggest that it could decrease distractions and cyberbullying (particularly with social media usage) and increase students' academic abilities and social skills, there is no evidence that phone bans decrease cyberbullying or increase listening in class. Phone bans in high schools are generally more likely to be supported by the centre-left Labor Party governments, while the centre-right Liberal/National Coalition is normally opposed to them, and the Coalition is strongly opposed to them in New South Wales.

Phones are currently banned or restricted in public and state primary and secondary schools in every jurisdiction except for the Australian Capital Territory (ACT) and Queensland. However, while Queensland plans to introduce a blanket ban in 2024; the ACT has no formal plans to introduce a blanket ban.

In New South Wales, the issue of phone bans has been perhaps more controversial than in any other state or territory. The New South Wales Coalition (currently in Opposition) is strongly opposed to a blanket, and during the 12 years of Coalition government in New South Wales, the state government repeatedly refused to enforce a blanket ban in high schools (though the state government did introduce a blanket ban in primary schools in 2018). During the 2023 New South Wales state election campaign, the Coalition again refused to enforce a blanket ban on mobile phones in public high schools, instead allowing schools to individually decide, while the Labor Party promised a blanket phone ban in public high schools if elected. Then-Premier Dominic Perrottet and his Cabinet were vocally opposed to a blanket ban on mobile phones in public high schools, with then-Education Minister Sarah Mitchell being perhaps one of the biggest critics of such a ban. The Labor Party won a minority government at the election, and newly elected Premier Chris Minns and his Cabinet reiterated that a blanket ban on mobile phones in public high schools began at the beginning of Term 4 in 2023, despite a large amount of controversy.

In 2020, Victoria became the first state to enforce a blanket ban, and South Australia and Tasmania soon followed. In Western Australia and the Northern Territory, rules intended to stop students from using their mobile phones at public high schools are in place, but they involve less restrictive measures than other states and territories, as phones only need to be off and not accessed during the day, though this policy is unclear as it does not specifically outline restrictions for usage on school excursions or other non-classroom activities such as recess and lunch breaks or during drink breaks in extracurricular sport activities, for example.

=== Bangladesh ===
Bangladesh imposed a blanket ban on the use of mobile phones by students in April 2011, and on October 12, 2017, Professor SM Wahiduzzaman, the director general of the secondary and higher education, imposed an order banning students and teachers in schools and colleges from using mobile phones. Despite this, students had continued to secretly bring mobile phones as of June 2022, so after an incident where a student posted on Facebook to humiliate a teacher, the Narail education officer Sayedur Rahman notified institutions of mobile phone use, asking them to search student bags and punish students who put mobile phones in their backpacks.

=== Belgium ===
In July 2024, the Government of Wallonia struck a coalition deal to completely ban mobile phones in elementary schools. This does not apply to secondary schools, but nevertheless they are still recommended to ban them.

=== Brazil ===
Under the Lula administration, the Federal Senate approved a nationwide ban on mobile phones in schools on December 18, 2024. When the bill was passed, almost two-thirds of Brazilian schools restricted mobile phone use during school hours and 28% of schools completely banned them. In addition, 82% of parents supported a phone ban. The ban affects students between 4 and 17 years old and was made to safeguard the mental and physical health of children.

=== Canada ===
Many provinces in the country have enacted some form of use of mobile devices during school hours.

In Alberta, a cell-phone ban took effect in September 2024.

In Ontario, a cell-phone ban was enacted for the 2024–2025 school year.

=== China ===
Ever since November 2018, all primary and secondary schools in China's Shandong province have banned the use of mobile phones in classrooms. In February 2021, China announced that children would be banned from using mobile phones in schools unless they have written parental consent.

=== Colombia ===
In August 2023, the 27 schools of the Union of International Schools of Bogotá (Uncoli) announced that use of mobile phones will be banned during the school day, sparking debate across the country. Camilo Camargo, the rector at one of the schools, stated "For several months, the managers of these institutions had shown our concern because the use of cell phones was affecting the learning processes. We noticed it, for example, after the Saber tests in which it was revealed that this impacted areas such as mathematics in students who spend more time connected to these devices" and relied on Jonathan Haidt's controversial book The Anxious Generation for advice.

On the other hand, the Ministry of National Education has refused to implement a mobile phone ban at the national level and instead encouraged schools to decide the regulations on mobile phones.

=== Denmark ===
Denmark does not have a mobile phone ban, but nevertheless the Danish Ministry of Education advised that mobile phones must be kept out of classrooms. Therefore, many schools up to 7th grade offer "cell phone hotels" for students to store their devices. Still, mobile phones are allowed in higher schools during breaks and free periods.

=== Finland ===
Finland passed a law banning mobile phones in July 2023, reinforcing teachers' and principals' powers to intervene in activities that disrupt the classroom.

=== France ===
Mobile phones have been prohibited for students from 3 to 15 years of age, since September 2018, although they were first banned in classroom time in 2010. In December 2017, the French minister of education Jean-Michel Blanquer issued a directive banning the use of smartphones in schools by children up to the age of 15.

In September 2024, it was introduced a general ban on the use of mobile phones in schools by 2025.

=== Germany ===
Unlike many European countries, Germany does not have a nationwide mobile phone ban because experts participating in a survey were divided over whether cell phones should be banned in secondary schools, although they agreed on banning it in primary schools. Nevertheless, most German schools have prohibited mobile phone use except under the bring your own device concept for lessons.

=== Greece ===
It is completely allowed by law to use mobile phones by students in school as long as their work is done first. This includes calls, texting, or any kind of camera use. Students must switch off their mobile phones or set to silent mode and keep them in their bags until their work is done and then they can use them when they please.

However, after UNESCO's recommendation to ban the use of mobile devices in educational institutions, regulations governing Greek elementary and middle schools have been strengthened. As a result, students are now prohibited from bringing mobile phones onto campus starting from March 26, 2024. However, due to over 6,000 students being suspended for phone use as of October 2024, Greek middle and high school students launched a protest against excessive discipline, particularly relating to the mobile phone ban.

=== Hungary ===
Csaba Mészáros, the head of Madách Imre High School, was dismissed after he refused to implement the Hungarian government's ban on mobile phones in schools in 2024. This sparked protests in Budapest, and Tamás Totyik, the president of a teachers' union, criticized the ban as outdated.

=== India ===
India also does not have a law explicitly banning mobile phones in schools, causing enforcement to vary widely. The Central Board of Secondary Education and many state education departments have made guidelines prohibiting mobile phone use by students and limiting use by teachers. Urban private schools often enforce stricter bans, confiscating phones when they are found. More rural schools have less developed infrastructure and thus the rule is not as enforced, but they may also completely prohibit students from using their phones.

Nevertheless, in August 2023, the state of Andhra Pradesh banned the use of mobile phones by students and teachers. Now, teachers will have to deposit their mobile phones with the headmaster before entering classrooms and can face disciplinary action for violating the rules.

=== Indonesia ===
Several jurisdictions in Indonesia, such as the province of West Java and the city of Mataram, issued prohibitions on elementary and middle school students from bringing their cell phones to school in 2025.

=== Italy ===
Italy was one of the earliest countries to ban mobile phones in 2007. Ten years later in 2017, restrictions eased, but in 2022, the Italian minister of education Giuseppe Valditara, banned cell phones from classrooms once again, this time from primary to secondary school. Electronic devices can only be allowed in schools if students use them for educational purposes and a teacher supervises their use. In mid-2024, Valditara also issued a decree requiring homework to be written in a school calendar with pen and paper.

=== Japan ===
In January 2009, the Ministry of Education, Culture, Sports, Science and Technology (MEXT) prohibited elementary and junior high school students from bringing mobile phones to school and recommended a ban in senior high school. Exceptions were made only if parents applied to the school and justified why their student would need a mobile phone.

However, after the 2018 Osaka earthquake, the Osaka Prefectural Board of Education allowed elementary school and junior high school students to carry their mobile phones when commuting to or from school. This started a trend of easing regulations on mobile phone use in schools as students in Hiroshima Prefecture have also been permitted to bring mobile phones as of June 2019. On June 22, 2019, the Tokyo Metropolitan Board of Education eased restrictions on junior high school students and authorized principals and local board members to make their own mobile phone policies. As of mid-2019, 26 out of 40 prefectural boards of education with regulations on mobile phones allowed students to carry phones to school with parental permission.

Furthermore, starting in July 2020, MEXT allowed junior high school students would be allowed to bring phones to school due to their increased penetration, but under the conditions that browsing functions must be disabled, children are informed about the risk of mobile phone use and schools would clarify where phones will be stored if they are lost. Senior high school students have always been allowed to bring phones to school.

=== Kazakhstan ===
Before nationwide legislation, mobile phone policies were set by individual schools and regional authorities, with no national restriction. Discussions and proposals on restricting phone use began as early as 2016. In Aktobe, local police suggested limiting student access to phones to reduce thefts and classroom distractions, citing incidents in locker rooms and gyms. Around the same time, prosecutors in Kyzylorda and the akim of Shymkent proposed bans to protect students from "harmful online content". The Ministry of Education and Science (MES RK) in response stated that schools could independently set rules in consultation with parents, provided they aligned with internal regulations. Some schools, such as Kiev School No. 1 in Karaganda, had already prohibited smartphones and other gadgets, The first large-scale regional ban was implemented in September 2016 in the Kyzylorda Region, followed by East Kazakhstan Region in October 2017. In February 2018, Senator Dinar Nöketaeva proposed that smartphones, especially those with cameras and internet access, should be banned in schools to protect teachers' authority and dignity, citing increasing disrespect and misuse by students and parents.

Despite growing debate, the MES RK initially continue to position a neutral stance, stating that banning phones in schools was outside its competence. However, in May 2021, it issued Order No. 235, an administrative directive banning mobile communication devices including smartphones, tablets, iPods, and mobile routers during lessons in most schools, with exceptions for military and special education institutions and the Academy of Justice. This was followed in August 2022 by Order No. 385, which incorporated mobile device restrictions into the official "Typical Rules of Activity", generally prohibiting pupils and teachers from using smartphones or other mobile devices during lessons unless required for instruction. In March 2023, the order was updated to explicitly enforce this restriction across all classrooms, making the prohibition formal and uniformly applicable.

The Parliament of Kazakhstan began drafting amendments to the Law "On Education" to introduce a nationwide ban on mobile phones during the educational process. The Mäjilis passed the bill in the first reading on 30 November 2023, the Senate approved it on 1 February 2024, and President Kassym‑Jomart Tokayev signed it into law on 23 February 2024, making it mandatory that students may not use mobile phones during lessons unless explicitly needed for instructional purposes. By 2026, the Mäjilis was considering extending the ban to breaks to reduce cyberbullying and encourage social interaction, while schools explored alternatives for tasks such as lunch payments without phones.

=== Malaysia ===
For schools under the Malaysian Ministry of Education, it is a disciplinary offence for students to bring their phones to school as well as to the dormitories of boarding schools. Students are expected to use the school's public phones or borrow a teacher's mobile phone in the case of an emergency. Phones brought to school will be confiscated and the parents of the students who brought the phones will be notified to retrieve the phones. If the student is a first-time offender, a warning will be issued. The student and their parents will also have to sign a letter of undertaking (Malay: surat aku janji, lit. 'I promise letter') in which the student promises not to bring their phone to school again. If the student is a repeating offender, they will be restricted from using school or dormitory facilities or will be excluded from school programs or activities.

=== Mexico ===
On November 3, 2026, Mexico instituted a nationwide ban on cell phone use in public and private primary and secondary schools. The ban was paired with an informational campaign to promote reading. This measure was supported by the vast majority of Mexican parents and teachers.

=== Netherlands ===
In December 2023, Dutch education minister Robbert Dijkgraaf imposed a ban on mobile phones, iPads and smart devices at secondary schools, which came into effect in January 2024.

=== New Zealand ===
In late November 2023, the newly-formed Sixth National Government confirmed that it would ban cellphone use in schools as part of its 100-day plan. The governing National Party said that banning cellphone use during school hours would help improve students' academic performance and outcomes. They also cited citing schools and parents' concern that cellphone use was affecting students' health and social interaction.

The Government's cellphone ban came into effect on 30 April 2024, the first day of the second term of the 2024 school year. Secondary Principals' Association of New Zealand (SPANZ) president and Papatoetoe High School principal Vaughan Couillau confirmed that several schools had voluntarily instituted local cellphone bans during the first term to prepare students for the official nation-wide ban. In addition to classtime, the ban extends to school breaks with the purpose of encouraging socialisation among children and young people. Special exceptions from the cellphone ban include health reasons (e.g. monitoring a student's insulin levels), helping students with disabilities or learning support needs (e.g. impaired communications), a teacher requiring them for special educational tasks and purposes (e.g. class assignments) and a principal deciding that they are needed for personal circumstances (e.g. the student is a teenage parent).

=== Rwanda ===
Rwanda banned mobile phones in primary and secondary schools on June 14, 2018, to curb distractions and human trafficking. The Ministry of Gender and Family advised students to not bring their phones to school and only use them with parental supervision. It also raised concern over human trafficking through phones, and a student who is caught using their phone would be sent home to remind their parents. Then, the parents would be notified and will have to sign a commitment letter that their child will not use their phone at school. Repeat offenders would be expelled from school.

=== Saudi Arabia ===
On August 31, 2021, the Ministry of Education banned the use of mobile phones at schools, less than a week after the ban was reversed, to allow students to check their COVID-19 vaccination status.

However, on September 12, 2024, the ban was reversed again due to parents requesting for students with medical conditions to use phones in emergencies.

=== Singapore ===
As of August 2024, most schools in Singapore have rules restricting mobile phone use by students and the Ministry of Education was developing a plan for schools to combat phone usage. Measures include dedicated phone storage spaces, restricting the times when phones can be used, and confiscation of devices. Still, there have been instances of children bypassing school rules by taking bathroom breaks, submitting dummy phones and accessing text messages on school-issued devices.

As part of a national strategy on children's mental health, Grow Well SG, various ministries of the government issued screen time guidelines for children under 12 in January 2025. These comprise a complete ban on screen time for infants under 18 months old, a restriction to non-educational screen time for children between 18 months and 6 years old and less than 2 hours of screen time for children between 7 and 12 years old. The Early Childhood Development Authority (ECDA) will direct preschools not complying with the guidelines to cease their practices. The Health Promotion Board (HPB) also will help provide schools with targeted interventions on students with health issues.

However, the long confiscation of mobile phones by schools has sparked controversy as many schools confiscate mobile phones for several months or until the end of the school year. In March 2017, a parent sued the Anglo-Chinese School in Barker Road after his son's phone was confiscated without being returned, seeking damages. However, the application for the phone's return was immediately dismissed by the judge. Separately, Lee Keng Siang, another former student at ACS, had accepted the harsh punishment.

Since January 2025 for all Singaporean primary schools and from January 2026 for all Singaporean secondary schools, the Ministry of Education (MOE) requires all students at all Singaporean Primary/Secondary Schools to switch off and surrender all mobile phones and smartwatches as soon as the student arrives in school. Students at all Singaporean Primary/Secondary Schools are strictly prohibited from using any mobile phone and/or smartwatch throughout their time within the school premises, even during recess, lunch, break, remedial lessons, supplementary lessons, Enrichment Activities and Co-curricular Activities (CCAs) and can only use their phones when they are not on the school premises according to Ministry of Education rules which must be enforced at all Singaporean Primary/Secondary Schools.

=== South Africa ===
Several movements in South Africa advocate for a mobile phone ban in schools.

As early as 2012, the National Association of School Governing Bodies petitioned schools to ban mobile phones due to their potential for distractions, but stated that a blanket ban on phones would be counter-productive. World Wide Worx MD Arthur Goldstuck also disagreed with a mobile phone ban, due to mobile phones being universal in a country where access to educational materials has been hampered by corruption. According to him, schools have banned mobile phones due to children accessing social media networks and schools should instead integrate mobile phones into education. Despite some concerns raised, as of 2015, 85% of students reported that they are not allowed to bring mobile phones to school, although 41% of them admitted bringing them to school. While students mostly oppose mobile phone bans in schools, a survey in the Western Cape province revealed that they keep their phones at home due to fears of theft and safety.

In early September 2022, students of Ndengetho High School in West Durban set fire to several classrooms in the school after police confiscated 400 phones during a search. In another incident in Northbury Park Secondary School, a 17-year-old student from Pietermaritzburg was arrested for torching a teacher's car after his phone was confiscated. Later on December 13 of the same year, the NASGB called for strict phone policies again due to a matric exam cheating scandal in Mpumalanga.

=== South Korea ===
The use of mobile phones in schools has been a controversial human rights topic in South Korea.

Starting from November 2014, the National Human Rights Commission of Korea had expressed human rights concerns over mobile phone policies in schools. In one instance in October 2021, a high school student in Daegu filed a complaint on his school's mobile phone policy. The school prohibited use not only during classroom time but also break times and it was a common practice among high schools. The policy involved phones being confiscated for one week on the first violation, confiscation for two weeks for the second violation and parent notification for the third and subsequent violations. The school argued that its mobile phone ban helped create a better educational environment and students could access the internet through the computer lab, but the NHRCK argued that the school should have better ways to create a good educational environment and said it violated students' rights to information.

However, in October 2024, the NHRCK reversed its decade-long decision on mobile phones. A complaint filed by a high school student from South Jeolla was rejected due to conflicts and disciplinary issues interfering with teachers' rights to teach and students' rights to learn. In addition, the school involved in the complaint allowed phone use in breaks and lunch to minimize human rights violations. Supporters of the dismissal argued that mobile phone use created conflicts between teachers and students and interfered in children's development. On the other hand, opponents argued that the freedom of communication was being violated.

=== Spain ===
As of 2024, all autonomous communities of Spain except for Basque Country, La Rioja and Navarre have a mobile phone ban in schools.

=== Tajikistan ===
Article 25 of the 2013 Education Law in Tajikistan prohibits the use of mobile phones by students, teachers and other employees in primary and secondary schools, as well as institutes of higher education.

=== Turkmenistan ===
Since 2020, all secondary schools in Turkmenistan have banned the use of mobile phones during lessons in order to increase the productivity of the educational process. The ban applies not only to school children, but also to teachers: now, during the lessons, they must put their phones on silent mode. Pupils can only use phones outside the school.

=== United Kingdom ===
In the UK, a survey showed that there were no mobile phone bans in schools in 2001; but by 2007, 50% of schools had banned mobile phones during the school day. This percentage had increased to 98% by 2012. These bans were implemented either by forbidding students from bringing phones onto school premises or by making students hand their phones in at the beginning of the day. According to a study by the London School of Economics, students' academic performance improved when cell phone usage was banned in schools. This ban not only helped students score higher in exams, but also reduced the students' temptation to use cell phones for non-scholarly purposes.

Secondary schools are introducing new, strict rules on mobile phones so that students under 16 will have to put their phones away for the entire day, after scientific evidence has demonstrated that students become more sociable, alert and active in the school environment without them. Students place their phones inside a registered locker when they arrive at school and are only allowed to retrieve them once school has finished. Schools have found that this rule has a positive impact on the students: more students are active outside, along with greater numbers attending clubs and social events. Nick Gibb told The Times, "I believe very strongly that children should be limiting their own [phone] use at home. Every hour spent online and on a smartphone is an hour less talking to family, and it's an hour less exercise and it's an hour less sleep. And of course, it is a lack of sleep that research is showing can have a damaging effect on a child's mental health."

The schools did note that the positive impact was greater for students under the age of eleven rather than in older students. In fact, it was shown that older students actually suffered from a restricted use of learning platforms on their phones, such as educational apps assisting in studying or learning skills. Students who were caught with their mobile phones during the school day were given punishments such as detention, expulsion or warnings. This has taught children to limit the amount of time they spend online and to focus more on their school lives, along with other social activities. Nevertheless, people in England have argued against this. Patsy Kane has said, "There's a fantastic range of apps now for revision—and the students are really motivated to use them."

=== United States ===
Poster informing students of the ban on cell phones in a school library.

In the past, some United States schools installed mobile phone jammers to prevent cell phones from working on campuses. However, the sale and use of jammers is illegal in the US under the Federal Communications Act of 1934, because jammers cut off 9-1-1 calls and disrupt air navigation if they are used near airports. In 2012, the Federal Communications Commission (FCC) became stricter in enforcing the ban on jammers. Mt. Spokane High School in Washington state once installed a jammer to prevent students from calling and text-messaging but removed the device after it decided that it was "probably not legal" under federal law. In 2015, a Florida science teacher received a five-day unpaid suspension for installing a jammer in his classroom.

In 2005, the New York City Department of Education imposed a citywide ban on mobile phones in public schools. However, according to The New York Times, the ban was "inconsistently enforced, with some schools allowing students to carry phones as long as staff members [did] not hear or see them, and other schools—particularly those with metal detectors at the doors—maintaining a strict ban." The ban was unpopular among parents as well because it impeded communication between them and their children. In March 2015, the citywide ban was lifted, with Mayor Bill de Blasio fulfilling a campaign promise. Under the new policy, school principals in consultation with teachers and parents may set rules on use and storage of mobile phones during instructional time and lunch breaks. While the default rule is that phones must remain hidden, principals may also elect to "require students to store phones in backpacks or other designated places, allow the use of phones during lunch, or allow phones to be used for instructional purposes." De Blasio said that the policy shift would allow parents to stay in better touch with their children, especially in case of an emergency. The New York City Schools Chancellor, Carmen Fariña, supported this policy by noting that the change means that students in schools with metal detectors would no longer have to pay outside vendors to store phones for them during the school day.

In contrast, Los Angeles Unified School District, the second-largest public school district in the United States, voted 5–2 to implement a cell phone and social media ban throughout the entire school day from the 2024–25 school year.

When asked which type of phone-restriction policy they prefer, students tended to support the side that grants them the opportunity to bring mobile phones onto the school campus, arguing that phones allow them to reach their parents if any problem occurs. In response to the issue of parent-student communication, parents also argue that there is not a replacement for mobile phones and therefore that phones are an essential device for students to have accessible, raising concerns about a child in danger or not feeling safe not being able to contact a parent and receive assistance. Parents also believe that giving a child a phone teaches responsibility. A boarding school in Massachusetts banned the use of smart phones, but not digital cameras and laptops, and handed out light phones for basic call and texting.

Theft of mobile phones is another concern in some schools. In 2012, following an undercover investigation, thirteen juvenile students in Bucks County, Pennsylvania, were arrested and charged with running a cell-phone-theft ring that resulted in the theft of several thousand dollars' worth of mobile phones, tablets, and other electronics.

An increasing number of schools are now allowing the use of cell phones as learning tools. However, the collective use of cell phones in schools poses other technological challenges. Some schools reported that allowing all students to use cell phones at the same time slows down school bandwidth speeds, and hence some schools have blocked phones from accessing the school Wi-Fi.

Phone use in schools is not just an issue for students and teachers but also for other employees of educational institutions. According to the Governors Highway Safety Association, while no state bans all mobile phone use for all drivers, twenty states and the District of Columbia prohibit school bus drivers from using mobile phones. School bus drivers have been fired or suspended for using their phones or text-messaging while driving.

==== Alabama ====
In February 2024, the Alabama State Board of Education passed a resolution strongly encouraging local school boards to implement policies that limit student cell phone use on school property.

==== California ====
Enacted in 2019, Assembly Bill 272 (A.B. 272) grants school districts, county offices of education, and charter schools the authority to adopt policies restricting or prohibiting student use of smartphones on school grounds. However, students may use cell phones in emergencies, with permission from school staff, or when specified in an individualized education plan (IEP). California passed a bill in September 2024 that requires schools, by 2026, to adopt a policy limiting or banning the use of mobile phones inside of California schools.

==== Florida ====
In 2023, Florida passed House Bill 379 (H.B. 379), which bans cell phone use by students during instructional time. The law also mandates that teachers designate a specific area for students to place their phones during class. Additionally, in 2024, Florida implemented a digital literacy initiative starting in sixth grade, requiring students to learn about the spread of misinformation on social media and their digital footprints. The phone ban also prohibits students from accessing social media on school Wi-Fi networks.

==== Indiana ====
In 2024, Senate Bill 185 (S.B. 185) was enacted, prohibiting students from using any portable wireless device (including cell phones, gaming devices, laptops, and tablets) during instructional time. Exceptions are allowed with teacher or administrator permission or in emergency situations. Schools must draft and publicly post their specific policies, including whether students can access devices during lunch and what consequences may apply for misuse. This policy took effect in July 2024.

==== Kentucky ====
Under Kentucky Revised Statutes § 158.165, the board of education in each school district is required to develop a policy addressing the possession and use of cell phones by students on school property or during school-sponsored events. This policy must be included in the district's standards of student conduct.

==== Louisiana ====
Louisiana passed a law that will take effect in the 2024–2025 academic year, prohibiting the use and possession of cell phones on school property throughout the school day. If students bring phones to school, they must be turned off and stored away. Exceptions are allowed for students who need accommodations for learning purposes.

==== Minnesota ====
Minnesota has passed legislation requiring school districts and charter schools to adopt policies on student cell phone use and possession by March 2025. However, the law does not specify the nature or scope of these policies. Legislators are now considering a bipartisan bill that bans cell phone use at the state level.

==== Ohio ====
Enacted in 2024, House Bill 250 (H.B. 250) mandates that school districts adopt policies aimed at limiting student cell phone use during school hours. The bill includes exceptions for students with health conditions requiring monitoring or for learning accommodations. The law took effect in August 2024.

==== Oregon ====
In July 2025, Governor Tina Kotek issued an executive order that required Oregon school districts to adopt a ban on cell phone use by students by October 31, 2025. The order also required school districts to fully enforce the ban by 2026. As of March 2026, Kotek said all Oregon school districts have implemented the ban.

==== South Carolina ====
South Carolina's Governor's Budget Proviso 1.103 requires public schools to implement a model policy regarding cell phone use, which was approved in September 2024. Beginning in January 2025, students are prohibited from accessing electronic devices unless authorized for educational or health purposes. A special exception is made for students who volunteer for emergency response organizations, who must receive written permission.

==== Utah ====
In Utah, a 2023 bill proposed to ban the use of mobile phones in classrooms, but the bill did not pass.

==== Virginia ====
In July 2024, Governor Glenn Youngkin issued Executive Order 33 (EO-33), directing the Virginia Department of Education to draft guidance for schools to create policies that enforce a cell phone-free environment. The guidance will outline procedures for parents to contact their children regarding logistics such as forgotten items or schedule changes, as well as protocols for students with medical needs to access their devices and for emergency communications. Additionally, the Governor allocated $500,000 to support the implementation of these policies and ordered state officials to solicit public input on the matter.

== Mobile phone applications for the classroom ==
Cellphone applications have been created to support the use of phones in school environments. As of February 2018, about 80,000 applications are available for teacher use. A variety of messaging apps provide communication for student-to-student relationships as well as teacher-to-student communication. Some popular apps for both students, teachers, and parents are Remind and ClassDojo. About 72% of top-selling education apps on iOS are for preschoolers and elementary school students. Additionally, there are a wide variety of ways middle and high school students can use mobile phones such as sharing documents, taking pictures, and having easier access to information.

A specific app that teachers can use is called Moodle which is an online course management system that can make content more accessible to students. These apps offer many different services such as language translation, scheduled reminders and messages to parents.

The app Remind is another way for teachers to communicate with parents and school administration. This app not only allows teachers to send out scheduled text messages to parents but also provides a class blog for teachers to share upcoming due dates, tests and quizzes, and other class information.

Another app that allows students to communicate with one another is GroupMe. GroupMe allows students to communicate in a group-chat format through Wi-Fi instead of using cellular data. Even some college-aged students use this app for sharing course information.

Mentimeter is a tool that allows teachers to develop interactive slides which promote engagement from students. While it is not the only tool that performs this function, a study conducted in 2022 showed that it is more digitally accessible than several of its counterparts. The blind participants of this study used several digital tools such as Kahoot in conjunction with various screen readers to identify any issues the tools had; issues were then categorized from minor to severe in terms of usability. In addition to Mentimeter being identified as one of the most digitally accessible, Kahoot and Poll Everywhere were labeled as mostly accessible with some exceptions for specific features.

== See also ==
- Mobile learning
- Social media in education
