= The Anxious Generation =

2024 book by Jonathan Haidt

The Anxious Generation: How the Great Rewiring of Childhood Is Causing an Epidemic of Mental Illness
- First edition cover
- Author: Jonathan Haidt
- Cover artist: Dave Cicirelli
- Language: English
- Publisher: Penguin Press
- Publication date: March 26, 2024
- Publication place: New York
- Media type: Print (hardcover), e-book, audiobook
- Pages: 400
- ISBN: 978-0-593-65503-0 (first-edition hardcover)
- Dewey Decimal: 305.230973
- LC Class: HQ792.U5 H23 2024

The Anxious Generation: How the Great Rewiring of Childhood Is Causing an Epidemic of Mental Illness is a 2024 book by Jonathan Haidt. It argues that the spread of smartphones, social media, and overprotective parenting have led to a "rewiring" of childhood and a rise in mental illness.

Haidt argues that the combination of the decline of play-based childhoods, exacerbated by what he describes as overprotective parents, and increasing smartphone use has been harmful to children since the late 2000s. In an interview during the WSJ's Future of Everything Festival, he advocates banning smartphones in schools, arguing for feature phones with limited features instead.

The book is known for influencing multiple countries across the globe to lock down websites and services under strict age verification mandates.

== Summary ==
=== Part 1 – A Tidal Wave ===
Haidt examines statistics for those under 18 on a number of mental health criteria, including mental health diagnoses such as anxiety disorders and major depression, self-harm episodes, and suicide rates. For each, there was a sudden uptick around 2010 when smartphones became widely available. Haidt notes that the same effects were greatly reduced for those 30 or older and were seen worldwide in other developed countries. He also rules out the 2008 financial crisis as a cause given that similar financial crises of the past did not produce such an uptick.

=== Part 2 – The Backstory: The Decline in Play-Based Childhood ===
Drawing inspiration from the book Antifragile, Haidt argues that children are "antifragile" and require some level of adversity and challenge early in life in order to handle difficult situations as adults. Without that experience, adults are prone to anxiety, depression, and other maladies due to an inability to cope. Historically, childhood adversity and challenge has occurred through play, in which children took risks, tested their limits, and learned to cope with failure.

Building on research from his coauthored book The Coddling of the American Mind, Haidt argues that risk-taking has been discouraged by "safetyism" where parents, educators, and other caregivers are overprotective and have minimized the physical and mental risks that children take. An example is playground equipment in recent decades being much less likely to allow behavior that results in cuts and bruises, but also that is not stimulating or challenging for older children, and doesn't allow them to test their limits.

Furthermore, the amount of play that children experience daily has been reduced for the last several decades due to schools reducing the amount of recess in favor of more time studying, as well as urban design favoring automobiles over pedestrian traffic limiting children's abilities to travel to friends' houses or public spaces such as parks.

These two things encourage children to spend time on solitary indoor activities, such as watching TV or using a computer. With few or no viable alternatives for play or ability to spend time in person with friends, children since the advent of smartphones are more likely to spend large amounts of time using them, especially through social media.

=== Part 3 – The Great Rewiring: The Rise of the Phone-based Childhood ===
Four foundational harms of social media are named: social deprivation, sleep deprivation, attention fragmentation, and addiction.

Citing information from the 2021 Facebook leak, Haidt notes that Facebook (now Meta) was aware of the harm Facebook and Instagram has on teenagers, especially girls. Furthermore, the leaks showed the company was researching ways to further encourage teenagers' continued use of their products.

Among the harms of social media, Haidt shows statistics that in the decade following the introduction of smartphones, the number of minutes spent daily with friends steeply declined since 2010, the number of students getting less than 7 hours of sleep has increased, and the number of teens reporting they have at least a few close friends has decreased. These changes did not occur for those older than 30 and affected girls more than boys. Haidt says that the increase in gender dysphoria diagnoses can be partially attributed to social media trends, with dysphoria spreading through social clusters, or "social contagion," a hypothesis known as rapid onset gender dysphoria, which is scientifically unsupported.

The concept of social media leading to "spiritual degradation" is explored. While an atheist himself, Haidt notes how spiritual practices include common human experiences, such as collective rituals, being in the same location as others ("embodiment"), silence, transcending oneself, being slow to anger and quick to forgive, and finding awe in nature. All of these are largely lacking in social media, and thus children heavily exposed to it are deprived an essential part of human experience. Haidt links the concept of anomie to surveys showing teens being less satisfied with their life.

=== Part 4 – Collective Action for a Healthier Childhood ===
Haidt notes that collective action is required, since many parents feel pressured to give their children smart phones in order to not be left out. He provides a number of proposed solutions for governments, tech companies, schools, and parents.

Government solutions include adopting provisions like the British Children's Code to other countries and increasing the ages protected by the American COPPA from under 13 to under 16. Haidt also calls for governments to enforce laws that prohibit companies from allowing accounts to be opened by children under a certain age.

Tech company solutions include having smartphone platforms such as iOS and Android provide additional parental controls limiting usage and access. He proposes having smartphones with child restrictions on them be able to preemptively notify social media sites that the user is not old enough to create an account.

School solutions include banning phone use during school time. Haidt also calls for an increase in recess time and encouraging more risky play as was possible in the past, which would provide children alternatives for screen time and social media while also building resiliency and making them "antifragile."

Parent solutions include building resiliency by being less overprotective, encouraging playtime, allowing time away from parental supervision, and encouraging children to accomplish tasks on their own. Haidt suggests a staggered age-based technology option, such as giving children "dumb phones" at younger ages and only providing more feature-capable phones when they are older. To avoid children feeling left out, Haidt encourages parents to collectively agree to not give their children smartphones until a certain age, giving the "Wait Until 8th" pledge as an example (referring to eighth grade in the United States schools; typically 13-14 years old) but criticizing it because "[he thinks] they should change their name to 'Wait Until 9th'".

== Reception ==
As of June 2026, the book has spent 111 consecutive weeks on The New York Times nonfiction best-seller list. It topped the list five times in 2024.

The book received endorsements from Oprah Winfrey and Jessica Seinfeld. Arkansas Governor Sarah Huckabee Sanders sent a copy of the book to the governor of each U.S. state and territory, urging them "to come together to limit social media and screen use for kids and encourage outdoor play to combat America's mental health crisis."

Other commentators, including sociologist Mike A. Males, have criticized the book for potentially being part of a moral panic. Males notes that, contrary to Haidt's claim that the "virtual world" is more dangerous than the "physical world", according to data from a CDC survey "teens who are not online are the ones most at risk of suicide, self-harm, being raped, pharmaceutical abuse, other drug abuse (especially heroin)," among other things. Males argues that focusing on social media usage overlooks more substantial, proven contributors to adolescent depression, such as an unstable or abusive home life. He also writes that far from being a 'mental health problem,' young people's unhappiness around the world may be the instigator of critically-needed social change." Haidt has repeatedly denied these "moral panic" accusations, saying that the similar panic about "comic books in the 1950s [was] mostly an urban myth spread through the media. This is different. Parents aren’t reacting to rumors; they’re seeing the effects of social media on their own kids. And unlike past panics, Gen Z themselves are organizing and demanding change. "

Peter Gray, a former colleague of Haidt's, said he thought the book was "unethical" and wrote "As a society we have almost a knee-jerk reaction to believe that the solution to any problem experienced by kids is to deprive them of yet one more freedom, and this book is helping to jerk some of those knees even further."

=== Academic reviews ===
Developmental psychologist Candice Odgers, professor at the University of California, Irvine and Duke University, published a review of the book in Nature arguing that most empirical evidence on social medial and mental health did not find a large or consistently negative effect, and suggesting that the correlation of rising social media use and mental health problems might reflect reverse causation. Odgers wrote:

First, this book is going to sell a lot of copies, because Jonathan Haidt is telling a scary story [...] that many parents are primed to believe. Second, the book’s repeated suggestion that digital technologies are rewiring our children’s brains and causing an epidemic of mental illness is not supported by science. Worse, the bold proposal that social media is to blame might distract us from effectively responding to the real causes of the current mental-health crisis in young people.

Odgers wrote, "I appreciate the frustration and desire for simple answers. As a parent of adolescents, I would also like to identify a simple source for the sadness and pain that this generation is reporting", but that ultimately "there are no simple answers."

In response to Odgers' criticism, Haidt, writing on X (formerly Twitter), argued that he and his co-researcher, Zach Rausch, have compiled numerous experimental studies, most of which support his claims. While Odgers acknowledged the existence of many correlational studies, Haidt asserted that his research also includes evidence for causality. He argued that its timing and international scope point more directly to the rise of smartphones and social media. Haidt asserted that Odgers pinned all the causes of mental health declines on the 2008 global financial crisis. At the same time, Haidt also asserted that his book's critics - Odgers in particular - lacked "an alternative explanation" for mental health decline, and asserted that therefore his own explanation remained valid. Haidt also wrote that life could not have gotten "much worse" during "President Obama’s 2nd term, as the economy was steadily improving". Haidt defended his selective employment of studies by saying that they did not promise to prove his point in the first place.

=== Journalistic reception ===
In the New York Times, David Wallace-Wells acknowledged Haidt's influence in shaping the narrative on social and mental health. However, he emphasized that teenage mental health trends vary between countries and need to be interpreted cautiously. He specifically took issue with Haidt's interpretation of increases in recorded emergency room visits for self-harm, because other factors such as changes to the guidelines for mental health screenings in 2011 and a 2015 coding change requiring the intentionality of injury to be recorded can also explain the increase. He also noted that life satisfaction has not deteriorated. Wallace-Wells cited researchers like Amy Orben and Andrew Przybylski, who argue that the evidence connecting smartphones to declining well-being is weak and contested. Wallace-Wells concludes that while smartphones may contribute to emotional distress for some teenagers, attributing the rise in depression and anxiety solely to technology oversimplifies a much more nuanced issue.

Writing for The Guardian, Sophie McBain praised the book, describing it as "an urgent and persuasive warning" about the danger of phone-based childhoods. However, she questioned Haidt's downplaying of global issues, like climate change and political instability, and their media coverage as contributing factors to youth anxiety. McBain also found Haidt's theory of overprotective parenting to be "much less substantiated" compared to his research on smartphones.

Helen Rumbelow of The Times gave the book a positive review, while acknowledging criticism it faced from some academics for relying "heavily" on correlation studies.

Mike Masnick observed, "By coddling the American parent, and letting them think they can cure what ails kids by simply limiting the internet access, real harm can be caused." Masnick cited the problems with the age appropriate design code and Kids Online Safety Act, policies which Haidt supports. Masnick argued that Haidt would "remove a useful and helpful tool from many who can be taught to use it properly, to protect a small number of users who were not taught how to use it properly. Wouldn’t a better solution be to focus on helping everyone to use the tools properly and in an age appropriate manner?"

Taylor Lorenz has cited the book several times as an example of a moral panic, noting "the same arguments that he uses are the ones that people once used for banning comic books, the radio, and all new forms of media." She has also noted the book's effect on a rise in more restrictive technology laws, such as age verification and social media bans, in countries around the world.

=== Political impact ===
News agency Reuters said the book served as the catalyst for Australia's Online Safety Amendment, a law which, as of November 2025, restricts the use of social media by minors under the age of 16.

== See also ==
- Youth mental health crisis
- Digital media use and mental health
- Parental controls
- Problematic social media use
- Online age verification laws by country
