= Suicide in colleges in the United States =

In colleges and universities in the United States, suicide is one of the most common causes of death among students. Each year, approximately 24,000 college students attempt suicide while 1,100 attempts end up being fatal, making suicide the second-leading cause of death among U.S. college students. Roughly 12% of college students report the occurrence of suicide ideation during their first four years in college, with 2.6% percent reporting persistent suicide ideation. 65% of college students reported that they knew someone who has either attempted or died by suicide, showing that the majority of students on college campuses are exposed to suicide or suicidal attempts.

According to the National Alliance on Mental Illness (NAMI), approximately 49% of the student population within the educational system have been diagnosed with or treated for depression. Recent studies have also shown that underclassmen are less likely to commit suicide compared to upperclassmen due to a lack of worry over bills or work. Many are full-time students living with their parents.

== History ==
During the 20th century, universities and colleges drew limited attention to the issue of student suicides to avoid damages to the reputation and image of their institutions. However, after a 1978 PBS broadcast of College Can Be Killing, awareness was raised concerning suicide whilst in college; leading most schools to begin creating programs to assist students while they were attending their institutions.

One of the earliest records of suicides of college students in the United States was in 1927, when 20 students across the entire continent committed suicide. Since the year 2000, rates of suicide deaths have increased significantly. In 2006, 1100 students in the US committed suicide, and 24,000 attempted it.

Researching the impact of the Covid-19 epidemic on college students has shown that suicidal ideation has decreased in colleges due to the increased emphasis on mental health and adaptive learning by collegiate institutions.

== Risk factors ==
=== Depression ===
Depression is the strongest correlate of suicidal behavior in college students. The 2017 National College Health Assessment found that half of college students reported being overwhelmed by feelings of sadness or anxiety. The combination of new stressors, identity searching, and the fact that many common mental health problems arise within the age group most students fall under; all adds up as factors that can lead students to being more predisposed to depression. The American College Health Association National College Health Assessment did a survey of over 20,000 students across the United States and found that almost 16% were diagnosed with depression. Within that same study, it was found that 10.3% of the initial surveyed students had contemplated attempting suicide within the last year before taking the survey. There is significant correlation between negative life events, such as sexual assault, and suicide risk. If untreated, the consequent emotional issues can result in the development of long-term mental health difficulties, including major depression, post-traumatic stress, and dissociation.

=== Suicidal ideation ===
Suicidal ideation refers to the act of thinking about, considering, or planning suicide. Suicidal ideation has risen in prevalence amongst college-age students. A study at Emory University found that 11.1% of students reported having suicidal ideation within the past four weeks and 16.5% of students attempted suicide or had a self-injurious event at least once in their lifetime. Suicidal ideation is associated with symptoms of depression, and students who reported current suicidal ideation had more of the severe depression symptoms.

Among college students, depressive symptoms along with the severity level of past suicidal ideations in an individual's lifetime, are two short-term predictors of current suicidal ideation. Factors indicating risk for persistent suicidal ideation include low social support, childhood or adolescent exposure to domestic violence, depression related to motherhood, and high self-reported symptoms of depression.

=== Stress ===
Stress has been shown to be highly correlated with suicide attempts. The American College Health Association's National College Health Assessment noted that 1.1% of college students made an attempt, citing that many other factors such as loneliness, issues within academics, relationships, money problems, and general helplessness play into that statistic.

The amount and type of motivations for suicide can vary from student to student; however, a common motivation for suicide has been stress. In a 2008 physiological study conducted by the Associated Press and MTVU, eight out of ten college students reported a feeling of horrible stress that impacted their grades. Another common motivating factor has been issues at home that can impact their academic career. Home-based issues can be composed of abuse, starvation, and overall poor living conditions. Depression can also be a factor.

== Prevention ==
National Suicide Prevention Lifeline, a crisis line in the United States and Canada

Social support may be key to help prevent suicide in college populations. The link between depressive symptoms and hopelessness was shown to be reduced among college students who had high levels of social support. Utilizing prevention training for those at colleges likely to interact with students has also been beneficial, as it has led to significant increases in the knowledge and skills needed for suicide prevention.

Gatekeepers are another form of prevention utilized within some colleges and universities. "Gatekeepers" are those people who regularly encounter distressed individuals or groups. On college campuses, these individuals include instructors, students, resident assistants, and other campus life officials. Gatekeeper training can teach those involved how to identify suicide warning signs and when and what to do when recognized. Peer-led suicide prevention workshops are similar and have also been effective at improving participants' knowledge about suicide and the resources available.

== Help-seeking behavior ==
In a national survey, it was shown that less than half of the college students who had seriously contemplated suicide during the previous twelve months received any mental health treatment during that time. Of those that received treatment, the survey showed that students who deemed treatment necessary believed that treatment was effective, had contact with those involved in mental health services, showed a lower personal stigma and higher perceived stigma, did not have many positive relationships, belonged in a sexual minority group, or was Caucasian. These correlations show that help seeking behavior among suicidal college students cover a wide range of personal and social factors.

=== College programs and initiatives ===
Many universities and colleges have begun offering assistance to new and returning students with dealing with stress. Some institutions have also begun providing educators and staff members with training and education on how to interact with a student that has expressed or shown suicidal interests or tendencies. The most common intervention strategies used by colleges involve campaigns to reduce stigma and provide education on mental illness, screen the population and attempt to link at-risk individuals with resources, or train people who are in often in contact with other members of the community.

== Social and culture ==
=== Legislation ===
In total, nine states have passed legislation regarding suicide on college campuses. Many of these laws require institutions of higher learning to inform entering students of available mental health resources, develop policies to inform students and staff of the proper procedures for addressing the needs of a suicidal student, and post all relevant mental health and suicide prevention information on the school's webpage. Pending federal legislation would mandate that the Substance Abuse and Mental Health Services Administration to award financial grants to colleges and universities to improve mental health services, conduct research about the mental health of its students, and expand training programs on campus.

== See also ==
- Teenage suicide in the United States
- College health
- Health promotion in higher education
