= Melania (memoir) =

2024 memoir by Melania Trump

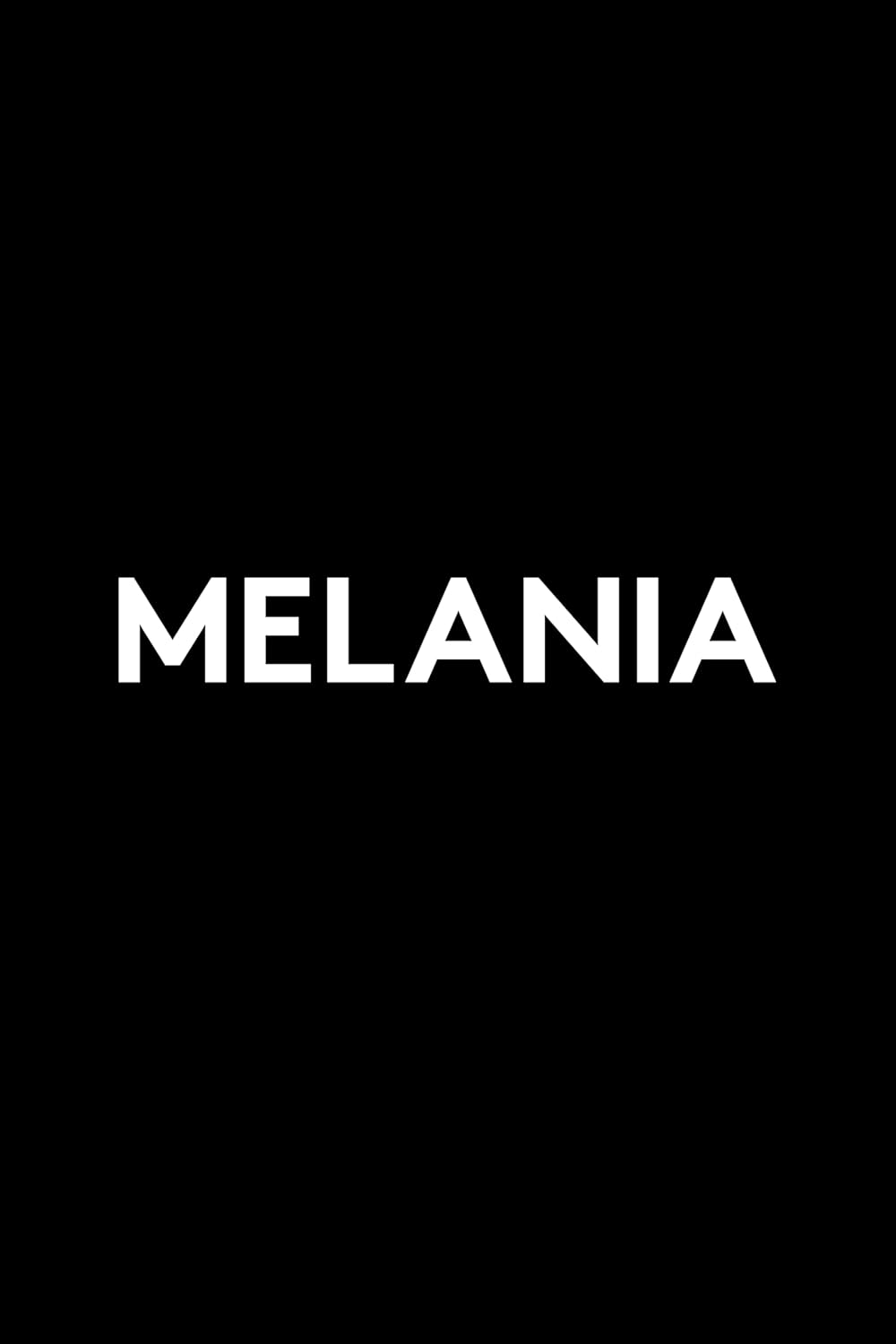
- Author: Melania Trump
- Language: English
- Genre: Memoir
- Publisher: Skyhorse
- Publication date: October 8, 2024
- Media type: Print
- Pages: 182
- ISBN: 978-1-5107-8269-3
- Website: melaniatrump.com/publishing

Melania is a 2024 coffee table memoir written by Melania Trump, the first lady of the United States as the wife of President Donald Trump. It was published on October 8, 2024.

== Background and promotion ==
On July 25, 2024, Melania Trump announced that she was writing a memoir set to be released in the fall. She described the writing process as "incredibly rewarding" but "daunting at times." She promoted the book by posting a series of short-form videos on social media and conducting an interview with Ainsley Earhardt on Fox & Friends on September 26, 2024, her first interview in over two years. Her husband Donald Trump also promoted the book at his rallies while running for re-election, although he admitted that he had not yet read it.

== Content ==
In the memoir, Melania Trump reflects on her childhood in socialist Slovenia, her modeling career, how she met Donald Trump in 1998, and her tenure as First Lady from 2017 to 2021.

The memoir also reveals some personal beliefs held by Melania Trump previously unknown to the public, such as her being pro-choice, a view contrasting with that of her husband. Additionally, she states in the book that she strongly disagreed with her husband's family separation policy in 2018. However, she echoes her husband's 2020 election denial claims, writing, "Many Americans still have doubts about the election to this day. I am not the only person who questions the results."

== Reception ==
=== Critical reception ===
Melania was criticized for its lack of insight into her marriage with Donald Trump, with Alexandra Jacobs of The New York Times characterizing the memoir as having an obfuscating writing style which "barely grapples with the mysteries of her marriage". An "unmistakable formality to the marriage description" was also noted by Sheila Flynn of The Independent. "If the Trumps ever have meaningful conversations, you won’t find them here," wrote Keziah Weir for Vanity Fair. However, writers for The Washington Post and Variety respectively wrote that the memoir revealed "a side of her personality that we don’t usually see" with "some occasional flashes of insight".

=== Sales ===
Prior to its release, pre-orders for Melania reached the top of a number of Amazon's best-selling books lists. The book debuted at number one on The New York Times Best Seller list in the nonfiction genre. Vanity Fair reported first-week sales of 85,349 hardcover copies according to BookScan, comparing the sales figures to Michelle Obama's 2018 memoir, Becoming, which also debuted at number one with 636,696 copies sold.

== See also ==
- List of memoirs by first ladies of the United States
- Melania and Me
- Melania (film)
