= Youth mental health crisis =

Rise in poor mental health among adolescents and young adults

The youth mental health crisis is a significant increase in mental health conditions among adolescents and young adults worldwide. The trend emerged in the early 2010s and escalated during the COVID-19 pandemic. Key indicators include rising rates of depression, anxiety, self-harm, and suicide. The advancement of technology and social media has played a large role in these issues, with data showing that adolescent girls are disproportionately affected.

== Prevalence ==
In October 2021, the American Academy of Pediatrics (AAP), the American Academy of Child and Adolescent Psychiatry (AACAP), and the Children's Hospital Association (CHA) jointly declared a "national emergency in child and adolescent mental health.". Two months later, U.S. Surgeon General Vivek H. Murthy published a rare public health advisory, sounding alarm at a "devastating" decline in mental health faced by young people in America. According to the report, while the COVID-19 pandemic accelerated the trend, the sharp drop in youth mental health had already begun ten years prior. Due to the increasing number of youth mental health issues after COVID, the CDC noted that 55% of U.S. Adolescents reported that they discuss their mental and emotional health with a healthcare professional. Compared to the past, youth, parents, and professionals today are more likely to talk about mental health issues, and this can result in better outcomes. Between 2014 and 2024, the suicide rate for young Americans aged 10–24 years has risen by 56%, with Black youth experiencing a particularly sharp rise of 78%. Other signs of mental health distress, such as self-harm episodes, major depressive episodes, and anxiety, have also shown similar growth. 32% of teens say social media has a negative effect on people their age. When asking parents their opinions on their child’s social media usage, 28% say their child(ren) struggle with anxiety and depression. Contributing factors to this crisis also include academic pressure, social isolation, economic stress, and increased exposure to digital environments, all of which can negatively impact young people's emotional well-being.

== Demographic disparities ==
Research indicates that the youth mental health crisis does not affect all groups equally. Adolescent girls in the United States and several European countries report higher rates of anxiety, depression, and self-harm than boys, a pattern that has widened since the early 2010s. Some studies in the United States have shown that non-farm rural youth have a much higher risk than those rural youth that live on farms. Racial and ethnic disparities also play a role; for example, suicide rates among Black youth in the United States have risen more sharply than those among white peers. LGBTQ+ adolescents consistently report higher rates of psychological distress, bullying, and suicidal ideation compared to heterosexual and cisgender youth. As well as socioeconomic factors such as poverty, unstable housing, and limited access to mental health services.

=== Discrimination against LGBTQ and people of color ===
A 2025 study published to the International Journal of Adolescent and Youth involving 1,972 participants identified that non-heterosexual youth were more often victims of bullying and cyberbullying. Sexual diversity has been associated with unique experiences of discrimination that negatively impact youth mental health, with sexual minorities experiencing a higher prevalence of both bullying and cyber bullying. According to Meyer's 1995 minority stress theory, the existence of "stressful events that are related to stigmatization, internalized homophobia, discrimination, and violence towards he non-majority sexual orientation" produce stress in individuals who experience them. This coincides with other research that indicates that a non-heteronormative sexual orientation poses as a risk factor for bullying amongst youth. Additional qualitative research that conducts qualitative interviews with LGBTQ adolescents between 14–19 years old demonstrate that around 70% described at least one instance of enacted stigma, calling for efforts to address diverse forms of discrimination and their effects on youth. These unique stressors and prejudices mediate associations between identity and depression, suicidal tendencies, and substance use.

Intersections between biased bullying among queer youth contributes to mental health disparities. Informed by intersectionality theory as stated by Kimberlé Crenshaw identifies how multiple social identities such as race, gender, class, and sexuality interact to create a unique compound system of oppression. Further research on bullying examines the bias-based bullying victimization of LGBTQ youth. Bivariate results point to LGBTQ+ youth holding other marginalized identities and in turn report higher rates of bias-based bullying expanding on the basis of Crenshaw's intersectionality theory. Experiencing any form of bias-based bullying is harmful to overall mental well being, with the prevalence of this class of individuals falling at more than a third of the sample researched in this study.

Very little research addresses the narratives of youth who are both racial and sexual minorities, as existing literature focus on race and sexuality as two separate groups. A study published to the Journal of School Health discusses the results of a bivariate analysis administered to assess mental health, school climate, and bullying rates among Asian LGBTQ students and white students. It finds that lesbian and gay students report significantly higher rates of mental health disparities and bullying, exemplifying 55.2% of Laotian LGBTQ students reporting higher rates of suicidal ideation in comparison to 49.7% of white LGBTQ students. Transgender students additionally report significantly higher bullying rates, finding that the intersection of identities maintain larger disparities. Results such as these contribute to the literature examining the experiences of LGBTQ students, and taking into consideration their multiple forms of identities to study the mental health disparities among queer youth.

=== Mental Health in Asia ===
In Sri Lanka, part of South Asia, there has been an ongoing look at children and adolescent mental health in relation to recent and past violence. Sheikh Shoib, et al. explained that due to the attacks and wars Sri Lanka has experienced, it has caused psychological distress not only in youth, but also children and young adults. With a lack of mental health professionals, youth have a hard time getting the help that they are in need of.

== Possible causes ==
A 2021 report by the U.S. Surgeon General suggested that "messages through the media and popular culture that erode [adolescents'] sense of self-worth" may be responsible. Similarly, in a 2023 statement, the European Economic and Social Committee (EESC) recognised the risks of "excessive use of social media", but also called attention to social and political malaise, as well as anxieties over climate change.

The 2024 best-selling book The Anxious Generation by American social psychologist Jonathan Haidt, argued that the rise of "phone-based" childhood and overprotective parenting has disrupted social and neurological development of adolescents. The book highlighted several negative factors, including social anxiety, attention fragmentation, sleep deprivation, and addiction. Others have disputed Haidt's theory.

A survey conducted by Politico in April 2024, involving 1,400 medical and mental health professions, identified the following factors as the primary drivers of mental health issues in children: social media (cited by 28% respondents), external events such as school shootings, climate change, war, and political instability (14%), social isolation (13%), and lack of skills to be more independent (12%).

A Pew Research Center poll concluded that teenagers are worried about social media's impact on adolescents' mental health. Nearly half of teens believe that social media harms their peers. Additionally, 45% of teens think social media negatively impacts their sleep, while 40% state it harms their productivity. Teens' reported effects of social media differ by gender. About 25% of girls believe social media negatively impacts their mental health compared to 14% of boys. Additionally, girls are twice as likely to state that social media hurts their confidence. Overall, girls are more worried about teen mental health. 48% of girls compared to 28% of boys reported being highly concerned about teen mental health. Teenagers are not the only ones concerned about social media. Parents are also worried about the effects of technology on their teenagers' health. 44% of parents believe social media is the biggest threat to teens' mental health, while 22% of teens identified it as the main factor.

Although young adults report that social media negatively affects their sleep, productivity, and confidence, many teens believe it boosts their creativity and connection with friends. A review of 36 studies from 2002 to 2017 indicated that social media benefits teens' socialization. Technology gave them an avenue to express their affection towards friends and schedule hangouts. Although many parents and teens attribute adolescents' declining mental health to social media, studies have found inconclusive evidence of technology's effects on mental health. For example, a 2017 study of 120,000 UK teenagers found no correlation between moderate digital technology use and negative mental health. Slight negative effects were observed in children with high levels of engagement.

Candice Odgers, a professor of psychology and social behavior at the University of California, suggests that negative online experiences are largely predicted by teens' vulnerabilities offline. Socioeconomic position influences adolescents' online activity. U.S. teens from low-income families, earning less than $35,000 a year, spent around twice as much time online compared to children from families with incomes exceeding $100,000. Another survey across seven European countries found that lower-income families are less likely to moderate their children's online activity than wealthy parents. Ultimately, Odgers concludes that children from low-income families are more likely to experience negative effects of social media, such as social media spillover, in which online events lead to in-person confrontations. Children who are already facing adversity offline are more susceptible to negative experiences online. Social media itself might not be the perpetrator of the teen mental health crisis; rather, it reflects teens' existing vulnerabilities.

David Wallace-Wells of The New York Times suggested that the spike in mental illness may at least partly be attributed to "changing methods of measuring and addressing mental health and mental illness."

According to the CDC, adolescents may have experiences that support or harm their mental health. Adverse childhood experiences (ACEs) are potentially traumatic experiences, such as experiencing violence, abuse, neglect, or suicide in your younger years, that may affect mental health or substance abuse problems in the future. Positive childhood experiences (PCEs) are experiences in childhood that support children’s upbringing in safe and nurturing environments. The more PCEs a child has in their life, the less likely they are to be diagnosed with mental health issues.

== Social solutions ==
Strong social connections at school have been shown to mitigate poor mental health during public health emergencies. During COVID-19, youth mental illness notably increased, likely due to rapid changes to the community as well as other stressors like economic uncertainty, isolation, and illness. The U.S. Surgeon General issued an advisory to research the relationship between social connections and adolescents' mental health. Teens who reported feeling connected to home or school were more likely to have better mental health. Fostering strong school connectedness can benefit students' mental well-being.

Programs like Teen Mental Health First Aid (teen MHFA) were developed to create peer support networks that better identify youth mental health crises. Teen MHFA was initiated in Australia but has since spread to seventeen countries. The goal of teen MHFA is to improve teens' mental health literacy. The program specifically educates young adults to recognize symptoms in their peers. Teens often feel uncomfortable discussing their mental health with adults and frequently report seeking help from peers. 48% of teens identified a friend as someone they would feel comfortable talking about their mental health with. Young adults are less likely to feel comfortable talking with a therapist, extended family member, or teacher.

Teen MHFA is implemented in high schools where students are taught to identify concerning signs such as changes in behavior, substance use, and increased risk of hurting themselves or others. A specialized youth mental health MHFA instructor taught the program in high schools. The course included three 75-minute classes, with presentations, role-playing, group discussion, and small group activities. Each session was at least one day apart. The completion of the course took approximately a week. The core curriculum centered on five first aid strategies incorporated into a mnemonic device: "Look, Ask, Listen, Help, Your Friends." Students were taught to identify symptoms and ultimately connect their peers with an adult.

Mental health questionnaires were implemented to measure the effectiveness of teen MHFA. After the training, students showed a decrease in social stigmas surrounding mental illness. The study also reported a significant improvement in mental health literacy, and students were four times more likely to feel confident helping their peers after the training.

A 2026 systematic review found that school-based mindfulness programs gave children and adolescents only small, short-term benefits compared with no program and worked no better than other structured school programs such as social-emotional learning.

== Public response and framing of the crisis ==
Scholars of social problems note that the youth mental health crisis did not emerge solely from epidemiological trends, but also through a series of claims made by medical professionals, researchers, advocacy groups, policymakers, and media organizations. These roles contributed to defining rising distress among young people as a national and global social issue. Professional organizations have played a central role in framing youth mental health as a crisis. The joint declaration by the AAP, AACAP, and CHA in 2021 is one of the most widely cited examples of authoritative claims-making, as it formally labeled the situation a “national emergency.” According to the U.S. Public Health Service, Office of the Surgeon General (2021), Surgeon General Vivek Murthy’s advisory reinforced this framing by providing federal recognition and urging national intervention. These claims have influenced how journalists, policymakers, and the public understand rates of depression, anxiety, and suicide among adolescents.

Major news outlets have also shaped public perception by spotlighting increases in youth self-harm, suicide, and social media usage. Coverage often frames adolescents as especially vulnerable to technological changes, social isolation, or political instability. Some analysts argue that media coverage can heighten the sense of a crisis by drawing more attention to diagnostic labels, survey data, and reporting practices. In this view, the “crisis” is partly socially produced through the broadening of mental-health discourse and the reduced stigma associated with disclosing symptoms.

Social media platforms, celebrity disclosures, and anti-stigma campaigns have normalized conversations about anxiety and depression among youth. This shift in norms has made young people more likely to identify and report symptoms, which may influence both statistical trends and the perception of crisis. While increased openness can lead to greater access to care, it also shapes the cultural narrative by making mental health challenges more visible than in previous decades.

== Policy ==
Early Action and Responsiveness Lifts Youth Minds Act (EARLY Minds Act) was introduced to the 2025-2026 United States Congress. The bill has bipartisan support. In the House, August Lee Pfluger II (R-TX) sponsored the bill. Alehandro Padilla (D-CA) introduced the bill to the Senate. EARLY Minds Act aims to amend Title XIX of the Public Health Service Act to extend Block Grants for Community Mental Health Services to programs that provide early mental health intervention. Currently, the Public Health Service Act only allocates Community Mental Health Service Block Grant funding to programs that serve adults with severe mental illness or children with serious emotional disturbance. The EARLY Minds Act would permit allocating up to 5% of Community Mental Health Service Block Grant funds to evidence-based programs that prevent mental illness.

== Summary statistics ==
=== National Alliance on Mental Illness (NAMI) ===
Recent public health data illustrate the scale of mental health challenges facing young people and the broader U.S. population. Each year, approximately one in five U.S. adults experiences a mental illness, and one in twenty experiences a serious mental illness. Similar patterns appear in younger populations: an estimated one in five children and adolescents aged 3–17 has a diagnosable mental health disorder. Half of all lifetime mental illnesses begin by age 14, and three-quarters begin by age 24, underscoring the significance of early intervention. Suicide has become the second leading cause of death among youth aged 10–14, and in 2023, one in five high school students reported seriously considering a suicide attempt within the past year. Survey data also reveal how social conditions and technology shape youth experiences. Thirty-two percent of teens report that social media has a negative impact on people their age, and 28% of U.S. parents say their children struggle with anxiety or depression related to social media use. At the same time, 55% of adolescents now report discussing their mental health with a healthcare professional, reflecting both rising need and reduced stigma around help-seeking.

== See also ==
- Anxiety disorder
- Depression in childhood and adolescence
- Mental health
- Teenage suicide in the United States
- Youth in the United States
