= National Suicide Prevention Week =

Annual week-long campaign

National Suicide Prevention Week (NSPW) is an annual week-long campaign in the United States to inform and engage health professionals and the general public about suicide prevention and warning signs of suicide. By drawing attention to the problem of suicide in the United States, the campaign also strives to reduce the stigma surrounding the topic, as well as encourage the pursuit of mental health assistance and support people who have attempted suicide.

As part of the campaign, health organizations conduct depression screenings—including self-administrated and online tests—and refer interested individuals to a national toll-free telephone number. Since 1975, NSPW awareness events are held throughout the week corresponding to World Suicide Prevention Day, which is recognized annually on the 10th of September. The dates for the 41st annual NSPW in 2015 were September 6–12.

== Background ==
As of 2011, the American Association of Suicidology (AAS), which sponsors NSPW, estimates that there are over 4.6 million survivors of attempted suicide in the United States. As of 2009, suicide is the 11th leading cause of death in the U.S. annually, with 33,000 fatalities resulting from approximately 1.8 million attempts every year. Researchers report that more than 90 percent of suicide fatalities had depression or "another diagnosable mental illness or substance abuse disorder." According to Major David Reynolds, chief of Clinical Health Psychology at Landstuhl Regional Medical Center, "The vast majority of people don't commit suicide because they want to kill themselves, but as a way to end the torment of not being able to cope with their problem." Suicide rates for young adults aged 15–24 rose 136 percent from 1960 to 1980. Suicide remains the third leading cause of death among people between the ages of 12–24.

== Subgroups ==
A 2009 U.S. Army report indicates military veterans have double the suicide rate of non-veterans, and more active-duty soldiers are dying from suicide than in combat in the Iraq War (2003–2011) and War in Afghanistan (2001–2021). Colonel Carl Castro, director of military operational medical research for the Army, noted "there needs to be a cultural shift in the military to get people to focus more on mental health and fitness."

Suicide rates for lesbian, gay, bisexual, transgender and questioning (LGBTQ) youth and adults in the U.S. are three times higher than national averages. According to some groups, this is linked to heterocentric cultures and institutionalised homophobia; in some cases, including the exploitation of LGBTQ people as a political wedge issue, such as in contemporary efforts to halt the legalization of same-sex marriages. Many tie bullying, including cyberbullying to suicides of LGBTQ youth. Celebrity Lady Gaga has been an outspoken advocate on these issues, and has met U.S. President Barack Obama to urge that bullying of this nature be declared a hate crime.

=== The Trevor Project ===
Founded in 1998 to address suicide among LGBT youth, The Trevor Project has enlisted a variety of celebrities, including Ellen DeGeneres, Daniel Radcliffe, Neil Patrick Harris, James Marsden, Chris Colfer, Kim Kardashian, Darren Criss, Dianna Agron, George Takei, and Anderson Cooper. They use NSPW to launch new initiatives and campaigns utilizing their celebrity supporters. The project was founded by the Academy Award-winning filmmakers of Trevor, about a gay thirteen-year-old boy who attempts suicide when his friends reject him because of his sexuality. The filmmakers realized that some of the program's viewers might be facing the same kind of crisis as Trevor, and not finding a helpline for LGBTQ youth they created one. The Trevor Lifeline is the only nationwide, around-the-clock crisis and suicide prevention helpline for LGBTQ youth.

== Themes ==
Each year's NSPW observance has had a specific theme:

- 2005: "Partnerships for Change: Advancing Suicide Prevention Services & Practice"
- 2006: "Science and Practice in Suicidology: Promoting Collaboration, Integration and Understanding"
- 2007: "Suicide Prevention across the Life Span"
- 2008: "Advancing Suicidology: Embracing Diversity in Research and Practice"
- 2009: "A Global Agenda on the Science of Prevention, Treatment, and Recovery"
- 2010: "Families, Community Systems and Suicide"
- 2011: "Changing the Legacy of Suicide"
- 2012: "Collaborations in Suicidology: Bridging the Disciplines"

== See also ==
- Assisted suicide in the United States
- Mental Illness Awareness Week
- Teenage suicide in the United States
