= Beta reader =

Test reader of an unreleased written work

A beta reader is a test reader of an unreleased work of writing, typically literature, who gives feedback to the author from the point of view of an average reader. This feedback can be used by the writer to fix remaining issues with plot, pacing, and consistency. The beta reader also serves as a sounding board to see if the work has the intended intellectual or emotional impact on the target market.

== Origin ==
"Beta reader" is an English term originally borrowed from the information technology and software industry, where beta testers use an unreleased product to accomplish a real task, partly to identify problems in the product.

== Differences from other roles ==
Typically, a beta reader reviews a draft that has gone through at least one revision. An alpha reader reviews a draft that is still without an ending or is completely unrevised. Alpha and beta readers must be well educated generally, with a good knowledge of current affairs. This enables them to read works in the current context, with regard to both world affairs and the target market that the work is aimed at.

A proofreader usually only looks at grammar and spelling and is a paid professional, while a beta reader is more holistic in their scope. A critique partner is a trained writer who test reads from the perspective of an author, while a beta reader is a trained reader, test reading from the perspective of a typical reader. A sensitivity reader is a specific type of beta reader who is from a culture that the author is not familiar with.

== See also ==
- Beta tester
- Critique
- Literary criticism
