= The Demon of Unrest =

2024 book by Erik Larson

The Demon of Unrest: A Saga of Hubris, Heartbreak, and Heroism at the Dawn of the Civil War
- Book cover
- Author: Erik Larson
- Language: English
- Genre: History
- Publisher: Crown Publishers
- Publication date: April 30, 2024
- Publication place: United States
- Media type: Print (hardcover and paperback)
- Pages: 592
- ISBN: 0385348746

The Demon of Unrest: A Saga of Hubris, Heartbreak, and Heroism at the Dawn of the Civil War is a 2024 narrative non-fiction book by Erik Larson covering the period immediately preceding the American Civil War. Larson knits together brief biographies of major union and secessionist leaders to portray the debates and events of that period. The Demon of Unrest covers only the time frame that begins with the election of Abraham Lincoln November 1860 and the following April, as Confederate troops in Charleston, South Carolina, bombarded Fort Sumter. The book features quotations from contemporaneous diaries that are especially informative concerning the behavior of secessionist slaveowners. The portrait of Major Robert Anderson, the U.S. Army officer who commanded the garrison of Fort Sumter, is considered particularly illuminating.
