= Teenage suicide in the United States =

Suicide among American teenagers

According to a 2023 Centers for Disease Control and Prevention study, suicide is the second leading cause of death for adolescents between the ages of 10 and 14, and the third leading cause of death for those between 15 and 25.

In 2021, the American Academy of Pediatrics, the American Academy of ChiId and Adolescent Psychiatry, and the Children's Hospital Association released a joint statement announcing a youth mental health crisis in the US. Emergency room visits for mental health issues have dramatically increased, especially after the COVID-19 pandemic.

In 2015, the CDC stated that an estimated 9.3 million adults, which is roughly 4% of the United States population, had suicidal thoughts in one year alone. 1.3 million older teenagers and adults 18 and older attempted suicide in one year, with 1.1 million making plans to die by suicide. Amongst younger youths, suicide is the third leading cause of death of individuals aged from 10 to 14. Males and females are known to have different suicidal tendencies. For example, males take their lives at almost four times the rate females do and account for approximately 77.9% of all suicides. The female population is more likely to have thoughts of suicide than males. College students aged 18–22 are less likely to attempt suicide than high school students.

A 2017 study by the CDC with the help of Johns Hopkins University, Harvard, and Boston Children's Hospital revealed that suicide rates dropping in certain states has been linked to the legalization of same sex marriage in those same states. Suicide rates as a whole fell about 7% but the rates among specifically gay, lesbian, and bisexual teenagers fell by 14%. In 2013, an estimated 494,169 people were treated in emergency departments for self-inflicted, nonfatal injuries, which left an estimated $10.4 billion in combined medical and work loss costs.

Suicide differs by race and ethnic backgrounds. In 2015, the Center for Disease Control and Prevention ranked suicide as the 8th leading cause for American Indians/Alaska Natives deaths. Hispanic students in grades 9–12 have the following percentages: having seriously considered attempting suicide (18.9%), having made a plan about how they would attempt suicide (15.7%), having attempted suicide (11.3%), and having made a suicide attempt that resulted in an injury, poisoning, or overdose that required medical attention (4.1%). These percentages are consistently worse than those of white and black students.

Potential signs include threatening the well-being of oneself and others through physical violence, a desire to run away from home, property damage, giving away belongings, joking about/referencing suicide, using drugs, isolating themselves, sleeping too much or too little, fatigue, despair, and extreme mood swings, among other things. Parents witnessing such threats are recommended to immediately speak with their child and seek immediate mental health evaluation.

== Population differences ==
=== Sex ratio ===
In 2005, male adolescents died by suicide at a rate five times greater than that of female adolescents. In 2005, suicide attempts by females were three times as frequent as those by males. A possible reason for this is the method of attempted suicide for males is typically that of firearm use, with a 78–90% chance of fatality. Females are more likely to try a different method, such as ingesting poison. Females have more parasuicides. This includes using different methods, such as drug overdose, which are usually less effective.

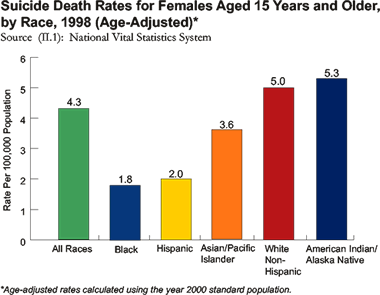
Female Suicide Rates by Race, 1998

=== Ethnic groups ===
Suicide rates vary for different ethnic groups. In 1998, suicides among European Americans accounted for 84% of all youth suicides, 61% male and 23% female. The suicide rate for Native Americans was 19.3 per 100,000, much higher than the overall rate of 8.5 per 100,000. The suicide rate for African Americans has increased more than twofold since 1981. A national survey of high school students conducted in 1999 reported that Hispanic students are twice as likely to report attempted suicide as white students.

From 2003 to 2023, the suicide rate for Black youth increased faster than any other racial or ethnic group. By 2021, suicide rates were increasing for Black children. From 2022, the suicide rate of Black youth exceeded that of White youth for the first time.

Black youth deal with the challenges of normal adolescence but also face issues created by systemic racism and discrimination. Racial disparities in the health care system and other institutions and the stigma associated with mental illness create barriers for black adolescents to access and obtain treatment. In 2013, the American Academy of Pediatrics came out with a statement about the impact of racism on black youth. Both overt racism and implicit bias take a psychological toll on black children. Institutional and systemic racism, overt and implicit, impact black youth's physical and emotional well-being.

=== 2007 study ===
On September 6, 2007, the Centers for Disease Control and Prevention reported suicide rate in American adolescents (especially boys, 10 to 24 years old) increased 8% (2003 to 2004), the largest jump in 15 years. Specifically, in 2004 there were 4,599 suicides in Americans ages 10 to 24, up from 4,232 in 2003, for a rate of 7.32 per 100,000 people that age. Before, the rate dropped to 6.78 per 100,000 in 2003 from 9.48 per 100,000 in 1990. Some psychiatrists argue that the increase is due to the decline in prescriptions of antidepressant drugs like Prozac to young people since 2003, leaving more cases of serious depression untreated. In a December 2006 study, The American Journal of Psychiatry said that a decrease in antidepressant prescriptions to minors of just a few percentage points coincided with a 14 percent increase in suicides in the United States; in the Netherlands, the suicide rate was 50% up, upon prescription drop. Despite the language of the study, however, the results appear to have been directly conflicted by the actual suicide rates in subsequent years. Youth suicide declined consistently every year from 2005 to 2007, and in 2007 reached a record low, even as the suicide rate for other groups increased.

=== LGBTQ+ youth ===
In 2008, researchers found that the rate of suicide attempts among lesbian, gay, bisexual, and transgender (LGBT) youth was higher than among the general population. LGBT teens and young adults have one of the highest rates of suicide attempts. In 2012, according to some groups, this is linked to heterocentric cultures and institutionalized homophobia in some cases, including the use of LGBT people as a political wedge issue like in the contemporary efforts to halt legalizing same-sex marriages.

A 2010 study found that depression and drug use among LGBT people increase significantly after new laws that discriminate against gay people are passed. Bullying of LGBT youth has been shown to be a contributing factor in many suicides, even if not all of the attacks have been specifically addressing sexuality or gender.

== Methods ==
In 2015, males more commonly used a firearm to die by suicide, while females commonly used a form of poison.

In 2018, the most common suicide method among females aged 15 to 25 was suffocation.

== Causes in teenage suicide ==
Teenage suicide is not caused by any one factor, but likely by a combination of them. Depression can play a massive role in teenage suicide. Some contributing factors include:

- Eating disorders
- Drug abuse
- Sexual abuse/rape
- Divorce of parents
- Trauma
- Household financial problems
- Being bullied
- Social rejection
- Anger/guilt
- Relationship breakup
- Illness
- Disability/deformations
- Domestic violence or abuse
- Academic failure in school and grade retention
- Loneliness
- Feelings of being misunderstood
- Insecurities
- Extreme mood swings
- Loss of a loved one
- Mental disorders such as major depressive disorder, bipolar disorder, body dysmorphic disorder, borderline personality disorder and schizophrenia.

Eating disorders have the highest correlation with a suicide rate of any mental illness, most commonly affecting teenagers (since data is correlational it is not possible to say with certainty that A causes B, and it is instead possible that a third variable is causing both [see Correlation and dependence]). Teenagers with Eating Disorders' suicide risk is about 15%. Perceived lack of parental interest is also a major factor in teenage suicide. According to one study, 90% of suicidal teenagers believed their families did not understand them.

Depression is the most common cause of suicide. About 75% of those individuals who die by suicide are depressed. Depression is caused by a number of factors, from chemical imbalances to psychological make-up to environmental influences. According to a 2019 survey, 50% of female pupils and one-third of high school students reported having continuous feelings of melancholy or hopelessness, a 40% rise from 2009.

There is a correlation between the use of social media and the increase in mental illness and teen suicide. Recent studies are showing that there is a link between using social media platforms and depression and anxiety. A recent national survey of 1787 young adults looked at the use of 11 different social media platforms. The survey showed that the teens that used between 7 and 11 platforms were three times at risk for depression or anxiety. Depression is one of the leading causes of suicide. Another problem with teens and social media is cyberbullying. When teens are on social media that can say whatever they want about anybody and they do not feel there are any repercussions for their actions. They do not have to look their victims in the eyes and see the hurt and torment they are causing. The link between cyberbullying and teen suicide is one reason that people are trying to criminalize cyberbullying. In 2011 the US Center for Disease Control showed that 13.7% of teens that reported being cyberbullied had attempted suicide. A Facebook internal study found that 13.5% of teenage girls say Instagram makes thoughts of suicide worse.

== Suicide prevention ==
National Suicide Prevention Lifeline, a crisis line in the United States and Canada

=== Means reduction ===
A 2009 study argued that limiting young people's access to lethal means, such as firearms, has reduced means-specific suicide rates. Child access prevention (CAP) laws were put in place with the intention to reduce gun related deaths of those under the age of 17. CAP laws first focus is on negligent storage of firearms to encourage gun owners to safely store weapons and limit accessibility. CAP laws differ from state to state, but can carry felony charges if there is an incident of negligent storage.

Another focus is on the reckless provision of firearms, which refers to children being given guns, and then having an accident. These laws were a response to high volumes of children dying by suicide, crimes, and accidents, with the highest number of deaths in 1993. The highest rate was in 1993, with 4.87 children per 100,000 killed in firearm related incidents. The effects of these laws brought down firearm related incidents to 1.87 per 100,000 by 2009, which was a reduction from over 3,000 deaths to 1,400.

=== Suicide awareness programs ===
School-based youth suicide awareness programs have been developed to increase high-school students' awareness of the problem, provide knowledge about the behavioral characteristics of teens at risk (i.e., screening lists), and describe available treatment or counseling resources. However, the American Surgeon General David Satcher warned in 1999 that "indiscriminate suicide awareness efforts and overly inclusive screening lists may promote suicide as a possible solution to ordinary distress or suggest that suicidal thoughts and behaviors are normal responses to stress." The 1991 study Satcher cited (reference 45 in the report) for this claim, however, surveyed only two schools over 18 months, and the study's authors concluded that the suicide awareness program did not affect. Satcher's claim, while it may be correct, was not based on a consensus among public health professionals. The Canadian journal of public health references nine studies being done on the effects of awareness programs on teenagers. These studies were mainly conducted in the US showing five of them having positive effects on teenagers making them more likely to seek help. However, there was one study that had a negative impact making teenagers aware that suicide was a possible option rather than dealing with their problems. This study also found that males are more likely to suggest suicide as a solution rather than females.

=== Threats of suicide ===
The American Foundation for Suicide Prevention advocates taking suicide threats seriously. Seventy-five percent of all suicides are of people who have given some warning of their intentions to a friend or family member. SAVE, the Suicide Voices of Education Foundation, states that threats of suicide are the main warning factors for someone taking their own life. Warning factors include planning a suicide, talking about dying by suicide, or looking for weapons to harm themselves. These signs can mean that a person is in need of immediate attention from health officials or a suicide prevention organization.

People who are at risk for suicide may be resistant to admit they have suicidal intentions because of the stigma that comes with mental illness. This is another obstacle of suicide prevention, because people do not want to be labeled by their mental illness. Someone who is making threats may be helped by recommending they talk to their family, religious leaders, clinical professionals, or suicide prevention organizations.

=== Suicide survivors ===
SAVE refers to people who have been affected by suicide, whether a friend or family member, as suicide survivors. Suicide begets suicide, because the loss of a loved one can place that person at risk to take their own life. A 1993 study showed that suicide survivors had increased thoughts of suicide, and other psychological problems, such as PTSD. Clusters of suicides are often found in communities, because it is a mental contagion that can influence others to commit the same act.

To prevent clusters, the CDC created guidelines to intervene with those affected by these incidents. The people considered to have had a close relationship with the victim should be given counseling as soon as possible, and then be referred to any additional treatment if needed. The section below list treatments for at people at Risk.

== Treatment ==
A common treatment for a young, suicidal patient is a combination of drug-based treatment, e.g. imipramine or fluoxetine, with a 'talking-based' therapy, such as referral to a cognitive behaviour therapist. This kind of therapy concentrates on modifying self-destructive and irrational thought processes.

In a crisis situation, professional help can be sought, either at a hospital or a walk-in clinic. There are several telephone help numbers for help on teenage suicide, depending on one's location, by country or state. In the US, dialing 988 will connect to the nearest support hotline. Sometimes emergency services can be contacted.

== Suicide in colleges ==
In colleges and universities in the United States, suicide is one of the most common causes of death among students. As of 2010, approximately 24,000 college students attempt suicide each year, while 1,100 students succeed in their attempt, making suicide the second-leading cause of death among U.S. college students.

In 2010, roughly 12% of college students reported the occurrence of suicide ideation during their first four years in college, with 2.6% percent reporting persistent suicide ideation. In 2013, 65% of college students reported that they knew someone who has either attempted or died by suicide, showing that the majority of students on college campuses are exposed to suicide or suicidal attempts.

According to the National Alliance on Mental Illness (NAMI), approximately 49% of the student population within the educational system have been diagnosed with or treated for depression. A 2016 study found that underclassmen are less likely to commit suicide compared to upperclassmen due to a lack of worry over bills or work. Many are full-time students living with their parents.

== Works ==
- 13 Reasons Why

== See also ==
- Assisted suicide in the United States
- National Suicide Prevention Week
- Suicide in the United States
- Suicide among LGBT youth
- Youth suicide
