= Mentimeter =

Swedish company based in Stockholm

- Company type: Private
- Founded: 2014; 12 years ago
- Headquarters: Stockholm, Sweden
- Country of origin: Sweden
- CEO: Johnny Warström (CEO)
- Industry: Presentation software
- Website: mentimeter.com
- Registration: Voters: Not required Presentation Builder: Required
- Users: 270 million

Mentimeter is a Swedish company based in Stockholm that develops and maintains an eponymous app used to create presentations with real-time feedback.

== Foundation and background ==
Based in Stockholm, Sweden, the Mentimeter app was started by Swedish entrepreneur Johnny Warström and Niklas Ingvar as a response to unproductive meetings. The initial start-up budget was $500,000 raised by a group of prominent investors, including Per Appelgren in 2014, following the market's tendency to invest in Scandinavia.

The app also focuses on online collaboration for the education sector, allowing students or public members to answer questions anonymously.

The app enables users to share knowledge and real-time feedback on mobile devices with presentations, polls or brainstorming sessions in classes, meetings, gatherings, conferences and other group activities.

== Achievements ==
By 2021, Mentimeter had over 270 million users and was one of Sweden's fastest-growing startups. The company also ranked #10 on 20 Fastest Growing 500 Startups Batch 16 Companies. It was ranked Stockholm's fastest growing company of the 2018 edition of the DI Gasell Award.

Mentimeter has a freemium business model.
