= BookTok =

Subcommunity on TikTok

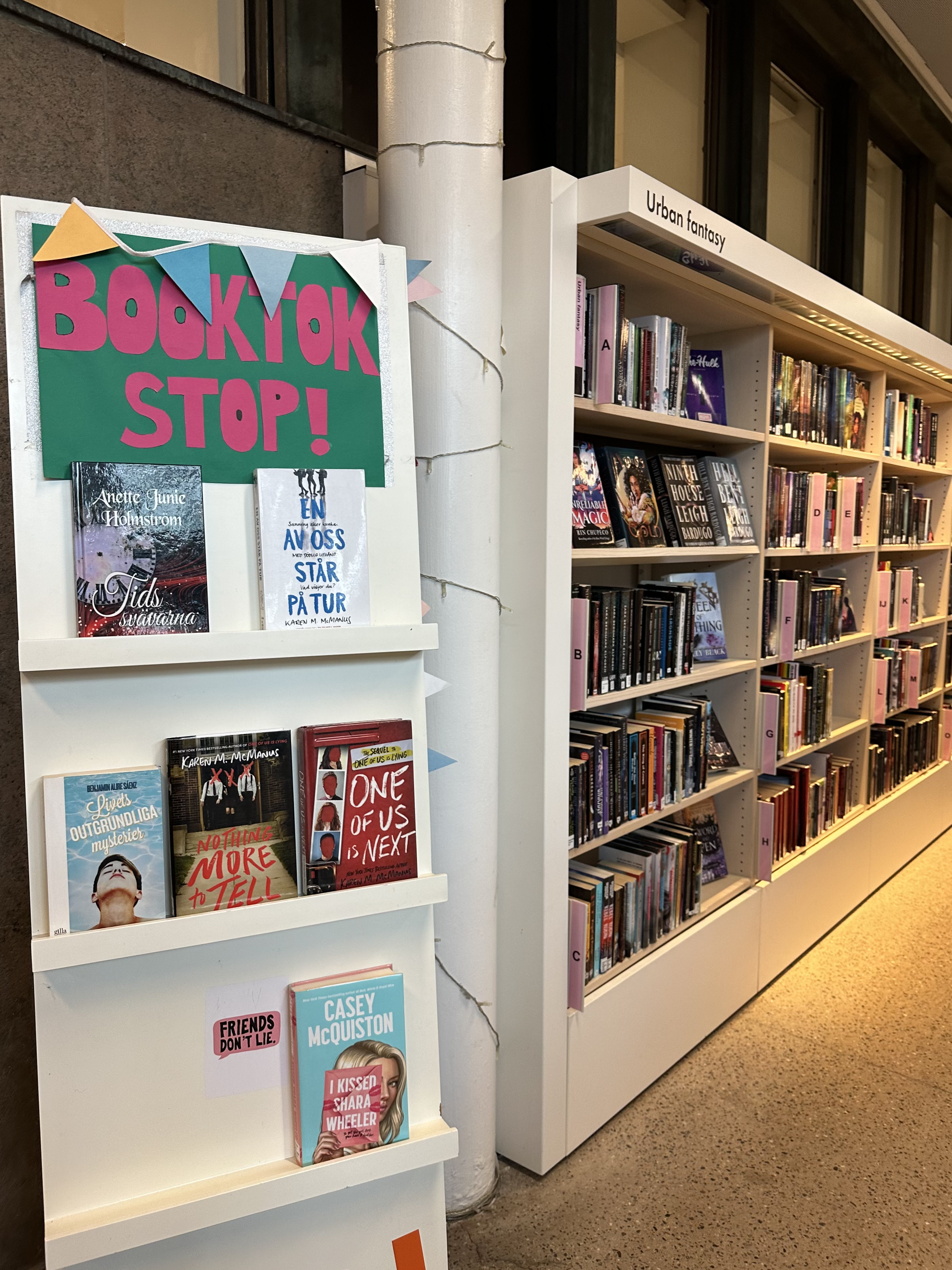
The BookTok Stop at the Gothenburg City Library, Sweden

BookTok is a subcommunity on the social media platform TikTok that focuses on books and literature. This book club emerged in late 2019 as TikTok was becoming more popular. Members of this subcommunity, known as BookTokers, make videos reviewing, discussing, and joking about the books they read. These books range in genre, but many content creators tend to focus on young adult fiction, fantasy, and romance. The community has been known to impact the publishing industry and book sales along with general interest in reading.

== Background ==
A large majority of content focuses on book reviews, book recommendations, book hauls, and bookcase setups. Some creators concentrate on specific genres, BIPOC and LGBTQ authors, or even publicizing their own works through their posts, while others post tributes and recommendations for books published years prior. The BookTok creators are predominantly teenagers and young women, with a focus on young adult fiction, fantasy, and romance.

BookTok grew in popularity in 2020 during the beginning of the COVID-19 pandemic. Currently, several BookTok accounts now have hundreds of thousands of followers. By 2021, publishers began to reach out to popular creators to collaborate with them to promote specific titles or offer free books. In October 2024, it was reported that the #BookTok had been viewed over 309 billion times on TikTok with about 52 million posts.

In December 2021, a BookTok community member sent out dozens of packages to other users which contained a newly published book and a coded message to create intrigue around the new book. The message was decoded within the month by a group of BookTokers called The Scooby Gang. Melissa Blair, an Anishinaabei user, was revealed to be the author and the book sold about 4,000 copies in the weeks prior. Other authors who post content using the BookTok tag have noticed that books sell more, and they can stay connected or specifically target potential buyers through the hashtag and other specific ones that apply to their books.

== Culture ==
BookTok has its own culture in the digital world with videos being reposted on Instagram, Facebook, and other social media platforms. There are multiple "subcultures" based on the kind of books a user is interested in hearing or learning about. Some of these various subcultures on BookTok are romance, fantasy, and historical fiction. BookTok features a variety of content geared towards these audiences such as reviews, book hauls, cosplays, or acting out various scenes. In this digital space, smaller groups are formed on outside servers such as on Discord, and books are able to become more or less popular because of this platform. There are many articles that discuss how BookTok has changed reading for younger people and impacted the publishing landscape.

=== Impacts on reading ===
BookTok is an online community where readers have come together on the app and have created a space where people can share their opinions, feelings, and interests in books that they have read. This has made people from around the world feel like they belong in a community, and it has made reading a more connected and enjoyable experience. The BookTok space had been linked to an increase in the desire to read outside of classrooms as well as reacting/rating books emotionally rather than from a solely critical standpoint. BookTok has made reading for young people a more enjoyable and social experience. Younger people have felt more motivated to read on their own when they see others online share their feelings and emotions about a book they have read. Content creators post a variety of TikToks about the books they are reading, but they often revolve around reactions to entire books or specific scenes. Some of these videos showcase visceral reactions to books that inspire other BookTok users to read the book. The Song of Achilles by Madeline Miller is a popular example in which videos of creators crying over the ending rose in popularity on the app. The emotional reactions from readers on BookTok, like crying or laughing over the books they have read or their favorite stories, is very similar to how readers in the past have showed their feelings about books. This has been a constant in book culture with or without social media. Frequently, part of the culture on BookTok is the discussion of how these books make readers feel. Booktok has not only encouraged the younger generation to get back into reading again, but it has encouraged people to connect the books they have read to their own personal lives and culture. In South Africa, BookTok has encouraged readers to see their own lives and heritage in the books they read.

Similarly, BookTok has extended globally and is very popular outside of English-speaking countries. In German-speaking countries, the trend has inspired young readers to read their local authors and even translated books.

Another popular aspect of the community culture in BookTok is the open discussion and the idea that users are reading the books together. Booktok has helped bring back new adult fiction, which is a genre about growing up, relationships, and self-reflection. This genre has made young adults connect their own lives to others that have read similar books and have similar backgrounds. When younger readers realize that they are not alone in what they are going through, it makes them want to connect and read with others that have the same interests and backgrounds as them. It can make the space of BookTok a place where people can connect and read books together a more fun and enjoyable area for reading.

BookTok has also helped promote writers from different and diverse backgrounds and stories to be seen and easily found on the app. This has changed the book's culture in how readers understand and think about books.

=== Impacts on sales and publishing ===
TikTok videos of people recommending books led to a significant increase in sales. Several books found their way onto The New York Times best seller list due to BookTok videos. In some cases, the books that received this boost in sales were nearly a decade old, while other books gained popularity ahead of their release. Books can become popular on the app due to either a genuine love for them by the readers, or due to shock and jokes about the subject matter, as seen with the science fantasy romance novel Ice Planet Barbarians.

Both authors and publishers began to notice the increase in sales due to BookTok. Authors began to make their own BookTok accounts, while publishers made accounts for their company and sponsored popular BookTokers to promote their titles. Some have praised the community for raising awareness of books that would not be as marketed as heavily, such as self-published authors. Large publishers would also buy the rights to publish books by independent authors who gained popularity on the app. The Atlas Six by Olivie Blake was self-published via Kindle in 2020 and became a viral "BookTok sensation." The fantasy novel was acquired by Tor Books and re-published with revisions in 2021. There have also been cases of authors receiving publishing deals for unpublished works that went viral on the app, such as Alex Aster's Lightlark.

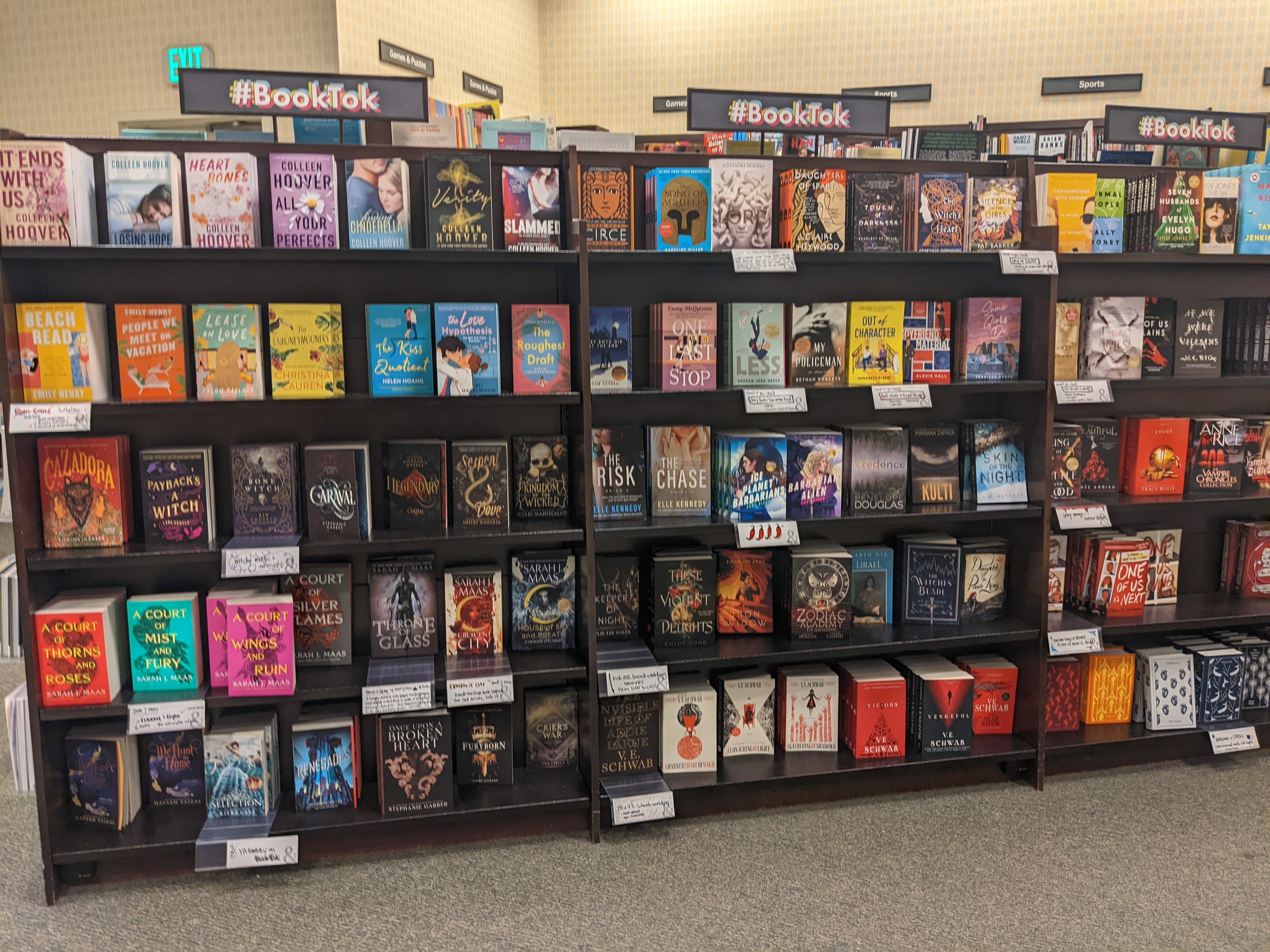
The BookTok section at a Barnes & Noble store in Los Angeles, United States

Bookstores such as Barnes & Noble have noticed BookTok's ability to drive sales, and have incorporated it into their stores. Many Barnes & Noble stores have BookTok displays, featuring popular books on the app, and the company also has a section of their website dedicated to these books. Many retailers view BookTok as an organic marketing method, as readers find what is trending through the posts and want to read the books in order to engage with the community. Some members of the community agree with the organic feel of marketing within the community, as it gives the readers more control over what books are popular. Others argue that it can create an echo chamber about which books should be read. The community may also be helping in a trend of more readers, with a growth in interest in reading and reading seen with the growth in the community and TikTok popularity.

=== Impacts on film and television production ===
BookTok has not only increased sales and interest in reading, but it has also changed the scope of production among movies and television shows. Although book adaptations have existed for long before BookTok, this new marketing strategy on the app has left more space for unexpected success in production. Many BookTok books have inspired authors and production companies to invest in making the stories evolve to the screens. Some television shows based on popular BookTok books include A Good Girl's Guide to Murder by Holly Jackson, The Summer I Turned Pretty by Jenny Han, and Daisy Jones & The Six by Taylor Jenkins Reid. Some successful BookTok movies are It Ends with Us by Colleen Hoover and Uglies by Scott Westerfeld with more in the works for the future.

Once these books are released as films or television shows, BookTok creators add content analyzing the production by giving reviews, recommendations, and opinions. This was especially prominent before, during, and after the production of It Ends with Us in 2024 as there were some controversial actions taken during and after filming.

== Research ==
Academic research on BookTok has grown since 2020. A 2024 narrative review of 21 peer-reviewed articles and conference papers identified three main strands: BookTok as a form of book reviewing, as a community, and as a means of promoting reading. The review noted that few studies collect data from BookTok users themselves, and those that do use small samples, such as eight teenagers in a Swedish interview study and five users in a study of how creators relate to the algorithm.

Survey studies have generally found positive associations between BookTok use and reading, though most rely on self-reported data. A survey of 120 Indonesian members of Generation Z found that greater engagement with BookTok correlated with more frequent reading, a wider range of genres and a preference for digital formats. A survey of 663 followers of at least one BookToker, mostly young women, found that attitudes toward BookTokers' recommendations predicted intention to read, while general social norms did not; the authors noted that the study measured intentions rather than actual reading. In a Dutch study of 173 ninth-grade students shown seven popular BookTok videos, avid readers responded most positively and students with negative reading attitudes were not drawn to the videos. Researchers analyzing Australian teen reading on Bookstagram and BookTok argued that the highly produced videos of prominent creators tend to aestheticize owning books without necessarily encouraging reading.

Content analyses have described what BookTok videos look like. An early study of 116 videos from August 2020 found that nearly half were recommendation videos. A 2026 analysis of 41,392 TikToks from 107 popular English-language BookTokers found that about half of the ten most-viewed creators mainly spoke to the camera, while the rest used captioned, music-backed montages or mimes, a format the authors termed "Captioned Soundtracked Montages or Mimes".

Researchers have also examined whether BookTok's reputation as an inclusive space holds up. One study identified a tension between users' sense that marginalized groups are well represented and the algorithm's tendency to show new users content aimed at white, cisgender, heterosexual women. A content analysis of 55 videos found that women were prominent among both creators and the authors discussed, but most were white: of 134 authors, 72 were white women and eight were Black, and authors of color mostly wrote main characters of their own background. The study concluded that BookTok had changed the style of reviews and increased the presence of women more than it had racial or sexual-orientation diversity. Other work found that some creators question or try to subvert the algorithm while others are comfortable with it, and in a five-person interview study users described acting for, with and against it.

Most BookTok research originates in English-speaking countries and concerns English-language content. BookTok has also been discussed as a collection-development issue for libraries, including academic libraries and public libraries, which must manage demand for similar titles and the rapid turnover of trending books. A thematic analysis of the top 50 comments on five #BookTok videos, framed by Bates' berrypicking model of information seeking, found that commenters mainly shared general book information, expressed emotional attachment to books, and encouraged interaction with other readers. The authors suggested that public libraries could draw on these patterns in collection development, readers' advisory and programming.

== Popular BookTok titles ==
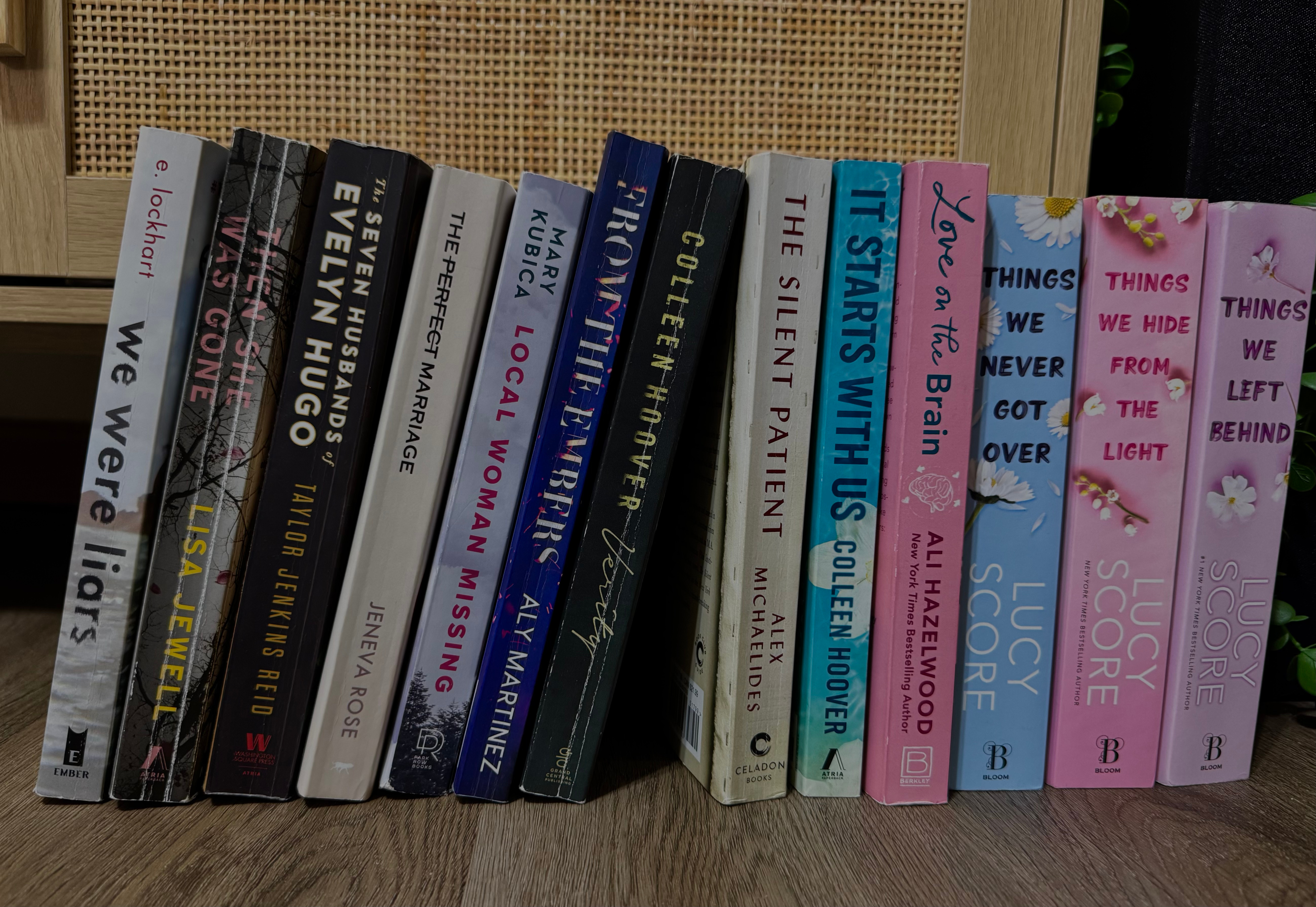
Some popular BookTok titles

"BookTok Books" are those discussed most frequently on TikTok. They often receive considerable attention from both the TikTok community and the outside world. Some of these books include:

Dark romance

- Credence by Penelope Douglas
- Fifty Shades by E. L. James
- Twisted Love by Ana Huang

Fantasy

- A Court of Thorns and Roses by Sarah J. Maas
- Fourth Wing by Rebecca Yarros
- Lightlark by Alex Aster
- Powerless by Lauren Roberts
- Fae and Alchemy by Callie Hart
- Six of Crows by Leigh Bardugo
- The Cruel Prince by Holly Black
- The Atlas Six by Olivie Blake
- Throne of Glass by Sarah J. Maas
- The Invisible Life of Addie LaRue by V. E. Schwab

Historical fiction

- These Violent Delights by Chloe Gong
- The Seven Husbands of Evelyn Hugo by Taylor Jenkins Reid
- The Unselected Journals of Emma M. Lion by Beth Brower

Historical romance

- Bridgerton by Julia Quinn

Horror

- Tender is the Flesh by Agustina Bazterrica

Romance

- Ice Planet Barbarians by Ruby Dixon
- It Ends With Us by Colleen Hoover
- The Summer I Turned Pretty by Jenny Han
- The Love Hypothesis by Ali Hazelwood

General fiction

- The Song of Achilles by Madeline Miller
- My Year of Rest and Relaxation by Ottessa Moshfegh
- Daisy Jones & The Six by Taylor Jenkins Reid
- White Nights by Fyodor Dostoevsky

Young adult fiction

- A Good Girl's Guide to Murder by Holly Jackson
- They Both Die at the End by Adam Silvera
- Uglies by Scott Westerfeld
- We Were Liars by E. Lockhart

== See also ==
- BookTube
- Goodreads
- TikTok Book Awards
- Twitterature
