= A Thousand Boy Kisses =

2016 novel by Tillie Cole

- Author: Tillie Cole
- Language: English
- Publication date: 2016

A Thousand Boy Kisses (2016) is a young adult romance novel by Tillie Cole. It tells the tragic romance of childhood sweethearts whose lives are shaped by terminal illness and death. After gaining attention on TikTok, the book became a bestseller. It is followed by a sequel, A Thousand Broken Pieces (2024), with a film adaptation underway.

== Plot ==
A girl (Poppy Litchfield) and a boy (Rune Kristiansen) first bonded in early childhood. When Poppy's grandmother dies, she makes Poppy promise to live life to the fullest and catalogue a thousand kisses as cherry blossom petals in a jar. Poppy and Rune kiss happily until, when they are fifteen, Rune's family moves back to his native Norway. He returns two years later, confused and hurt that Poppy has ghosted him. As they reconnect and remember their earlier relationship, Rune learns that Poppy has been diagnosed with a terminal illness.

== Reception ==
A Thousand Boy Kisses gained attention on TikTok, where the BookTok community embraced it as a tear-jerker. A reviewer for the high school newspaper The Talon praised the book's messages about love and inner strength. It was on the New York Times bestseller list for seven months, and was nominated for a Goodreads Choice Award in 2016 as Readers' Favorite Young Adult Fiction.

== Film ==
Netflix is creating a film based on this book and Stephen Chbosky will direct it.

== Sequel ==
A Thousand Broken Pieces (2024) is the second book. It tells Poppy's sister's story, how she dealt with Poppy's death. This book was nominated in the 2024 Goodreads Choice Award in the same category as the first book.
