= Silo (series) =

Sci-fi books and stories by Hugh Howey (2011–2015)

- Wool (2011); Shift (2013); Dust (2013)
- Author: Hugh Howey
- Country: United States
- Language: English
- Genre: Science fiction, dystopian fiction, apocalyptic fiction
- Publisher: Booktrack (with soundtrack); Kindle Direct Publishing
- Media type: e-book
- No. of books: 3 + 3 short stories

Silo is a dystopian series of post-apocalyptic science fiction books by American writer Hugh Howey. The series started in 2011 with the short story Wool, which was later published together with four sequel novellas as a novel with the same name. Along with Wool, the series consists of Shift, Dust, and three short stories. The series has also been adapted as a graphic novel and a television series on Apple TV+.

== Background ==
Howey began the series in 2011, initially writing Wool as a short story. He published the work through Amazon's Kindle Direct Publishing system, opting for self-publishing. After the series grew in popularity, he completed additional entries as a series of short stories, later publishing them as a single book entitled Wool. Howey began soliciting international rights in 2012 and has since signed a deal for dramatic rights in Brazil.

By March 2013, Howey signed a print-only deal for around US$500,000 (equivalent to $690,000 in 2025) with Simon & Schuster, to distribute print copies of the initial collection, Wool, to book retailers in the US and Canada; he turned down $1,000,000+ offers from publishing houses to retain full rights to continue distributing Wool online, noting that he had already earned more than seven figures from his online publishing royalties.

== Works ==
=== Novels ===
Originally published as novellas, the series is commonly packaged as three novels. In 2021, Howey tweeted that he had begun a new entry in the series about Silo 40. In a 2025 Reddit AMA, Howey revealed he has planned another trilogy about Silo 40.

1. Wool (2011)
Contains the novellas:
- Holston (short story)
- Proper Gauge
- Casting Off
- The Unraveling
- The Stranded
2. Shift (2013)
Contains the novellas:
- First Shift — Legacy
- Second Shift — Order
- Third Shift — Pact
3. Dust (2013)

=== Short stories ===
Short stories (published in The Apocalypse Triptych and Howey's anthology Machine Learning)

- "In the Air" (2014)
- "In the Mountains" (2014)
- "In the Woods" (2015)

== Plot ==
The story of Wool takes place on a post-apocalyptic Earth. Humanity clings to survival in the Silo, a self-sustaining subterranean city with 144 floors. No records of the time before the Silo remain. All residents of the Silo are taught that the outside world is toxic and deadly, and the Silo's cardinal rule is that anyone who expresses a desire to go outside must be sent outside to clean the external sensors of the silo, while facing certain death. The deaths of those sent to clean reaffirm to the Silo residents that the outdoors remain uninhabitable.

=== Wool ===
Wool is the first act of the series and consists of books 1 through 5: Holston, Proper Gauge, Casting Off, The Unraveling, and The Stranded.

Holston is the sheriff of the Silo. His wife, Allison, is three years dead, having expressed interest in "the outside" (a capital crime) and being sent "to cleaning": expelled from the silo with no way to return, yet expected to clean the silo's external sensors before dying. Still grieving, Holston also asks to go outside. He is given a protective suit and expelled, but he discovers a healthy, vibrant world. Encouraged by this sight, he happily also cleans, and then begins to explore, entertaining hope that Allison might still be alive. However, he is forced to remove his helmet when he runs out of air, and at that point, he discovers that the world is actually toxic and his wife truly is dead. The suit's visor had been masking reality with a computer-generated image. Holston dies near his wife's abandoned body.

Following Holston's death, Deputy Marnes advocates a sheriff candidate named Juliette Nichols, a mechanic who once helped investigate the death of another mechanic named George. Mayor Jahns and Marnes embark on a trip to Mechanical, descending 100 levels to the "down deep", to interview her. Along the way, they visit the IT department. Bernard, the head of IT, demands his own preferred candidate, Peter Billings, for sheriff, but Jahns is dismissive. Later, Jahns is impressed by Juliette, who quickly proves herself to be responsible, stubborn, and independent. Juliette agrees to become sheriff on the condition that she is permitted to perform long-overdue mechanical maintenance, which requires a power blackout, and Jahns assents to the plan. Bernard is incensed by the blackout and Juliette's appointment and poisons Marnes's canteen on their way back up. Because Jahns was drinking from Marnes' canteen, she dies.

Upon the mayor's death, per the terms of "The Pact", IT head, Bernard, automatically becomes interim mayor. Juliette begins duties as sheriff. She meets a man, Lukas, who loiters near her office to study the stars in the large display there, and there is an instant chemistry between them. Bernard quickly moves to replace Juliette with Peter Billings as sheriff. He also singles out Lukas, who works in IT, to become his successor (unaware of his connection to Juliette). Bernard reveals secrets to Lukas, notably the existence of other silos and how to communicate with them. Meanwhile, Deputy Marnes and an IT worker friend of Juliette's are both found dead, apparently of suicide, but Bernard implicates Juliette and condemns her to cleaning. One of Juliette's friends in Mechanical, Walker, secretly arranges for her protective suit to be made out of quality materials, unlike all previous protective suits, which were secretly designed to fail. When she exits the Silo, Juliette realizes that her suit's visor contains a high-resolution display and is deceiving her. Instead of cleaning the sensors, she becomes the first cleaner to walk out of the sensor's range of sight.

Juliette finds the entrance to another Silo. Inside, she encounters a middle-aged man calling himself Solo, who explains that this is Silo 17 and he is the last survivor of an uprising decades ago. Solo reveals that there are dozens more Silos, and he shows Juliette how to communicate with them, including her own Silo 18. Juliette makes contact with Lukas, and they further develop their relationship. Meanwhile, Walker reveals the deceitfulness of Bernard, and Juliette's friends in Mechanical begin an uprising against IT, which Bernard and his men (including Lukas) brutally suppress. Bernard justifies the violence as necessary, and confesses to having killed George as an agitator. Lukas condemns the violence and Bernard, changing his mind about Lukas as successor, immediately condemns him to cleaning, which Juliette overhears on her radio in Silo 17.

Determined to save him, she dons a protective suit, equips herself with a protective blanket for Lukas, and returns to Silo 18. She arrives just as the airlock is being opened; inside is a figure who must be Lukas, but he refuses to exit. Knowing he will be killed by the cleansing fires used to sanitize the airlock, she enters and deploys the blanket, but he refuses her help. He dies and she is badly burned. Belatedly she realizes that the figure was not Lukas but Bernard. Lukas had revealed him as George's murderer, and he had been deposed and sent to cleaning through the honesty of the sheriff. Juliette is exonerated and hailed as a hero for defying the duplicitous Bernard, and she is elected the next mayor.

=== Shift ===
Shift is the second arc of the series, consisting of books 6 through 8: Legacy, Order, and Pact. It is a prequel to the Wool arc.

In 2049, freshman Congressman Donald Keene is recruited by Senator Paul Thurman for the CAD-FAC (Containment and Disposal Facility) project, ostensibly an underground repository for the world's nuclear waste to be constructed in Fulton County, Georgia. Donald, who has an education in architecture, is to design a self-sustaining shelter, a Silo, that will be built near the CAD-FAC for facility workers to use during emergencies.

In 2052, the CAD-FAC is completed, and the site above it hosts the Democratic National Convention. Donald and Thurman are present for the opening ceremonies when a nuclear blast destroys Atlanta and they and other attendees are ushered into the CAD-FAC. Thurman reveals that CAD-FAC was a cover for World Order Operation Fifty (W.O.O.L), (Note: The "L" in the acronym W.O.O.L is the Roman numeral for 50.) an initiative to preserve humanity in the event the species was threatened with extinction. Nuclear detonations have scourged the Earth's surface, and it will not be safe to resettle for 500 years.

The shelter consists of fifty Silos. They are managed by Silo 1, which houses Operation Fifty co-leaders Thurman, Erskine, and Victor, and other key personnel such as Donald. While 49 Silos have generational populations, Silo 1's inhabitants are cycled in and out of cryogenic stasis every few decades to work six-month shifts guiding Operation Fifty through the centuries. The other Silos suffer internal rebellions of varying intensity every couple of decades. Major rebellions are treated with "resetting": the population is reduced, the remaining residents are given amnesia-inducing medication, and the computers are wiped. When a rebellion overtakes a Silo completely, overwhelming its IT department or gaining control of the airlock, Silo 1 terminates it by remotely releasing a deadly "gas" (later revealed to be a nanobot swarm) into the silo, a procedure known as the "Safeguard".

By 2212, Operation Fifty entered a crisis. A cluster of eleven Silos, led by Silo 40, severed contact with Silo 1 and jammed the termination signal, forcing Silo 1 to resort to demolishing them. On the heels of that, a rebellion began in Silo 18, and concerns mounted that the entire project was doomed to fail. Donald was awakened on Thurman's orders to find a solution after Victor, the mastermind behind Operation Fifty, committed suicide. Thurman and Erskine divulged to Donald that they headed a conspiracy that instigated the nuclear apocalypse and justified their actions as protecting humanity from annihilation by nanotechnology. When Operation Fifty was conceived, self-replicating nanobots had become commonplace in medical science. But Erskine, a nanobot engineer, discovered that hostile countries and terrorist groups had released weaponized versions. While these harmful nanobots were imperfect, they had already spread throughout the world and were evolving, so pandemics of increasing lethality were unavoidable. Victor convinced Thurman and Erskine to implement Operation Fifty: destroy human civilization before weaponized nanobots did so, leaving the occupants of the Silos as the only surviving humans while Earth's surface is thoroughly cleansed by benign nanobots. Donald detested his involvement in Operation Fifty, but continued cooperating since the fate of humanity depended on the silos' success. He deduced that the linchpin of Silo 18's rebellion was an elderly teacher named Mrs. Crowe, who had immunity to the amnesia medication, and Silo 18 was reset instead of terminated.

In 2345, Juliette makes her journey from Silo 18 to Silo 17. The Silo 1 staff go to awaken Thurman per protocol but mistakenly wake Donald instead due to interference by Thurman's daughter Anna. Using Thurman's authority, Donald uncovers that only one Silo out of all 50 is going to be permitted to resettle the world since Thurman wants to guarantee that no knowledge of nanotechnology or nuclear weapons persists; on E-Day in 2550, the fortunate Silo will be selected by a computer algorithm evaluating numerous variables, and the others will be terminated. Donald decides to avert this so that all Silos live.

Donald's narrative is interspersed with early events in Silos 17 and 18. In Silo 18, the Great Uprising touches off and is quelled with the removal of its ringleader, Mrs. Crowe. A young revolutionary named Mission has his memory wiped, becomes a compliant citizen, and is permitted to start a family. It is implied that Mission is an ancestor of Allison, Holston's wife. In 2312, a rebellion in Silo 17 results in it being terminated by Silo 1, leaving Jimmy Parker, the son of the Silo's IT head, as one of a few survivors. Jimmy renames himself Solo.

=== Dust ===
Dust is the third and final arc of the series, contained in a single book of the same name. It concludes the stories begun in Wool and Shift.

Donald maintains regular contact with Juliette and Lukas in Silo 18, but his health begins deteriorating rapidly. During this back and forth with Donald, Juliette decides to conduct experiments to determine just how poisonous the outside air really is. As a result of these tests she eventually learns that the benign argon gas that they have been pumping into the airlock with every cleaning is not gas at all, but is in fact clouds of deadly nanobots programmed to eat away at the inferior tape on the suits and then kill the occupant inside. During this time, the residents of Silo 18 undertake the excavation of a tunnel to Silo 17. Thurman is awakened and reasserts control over Silo 1, resulting in Donald being beaten and imprisoned. The tunnel breaks through to Silo 17 just as Thurman notices that Silo 18 has gone rogue and orders its termination, and only about 200 residents make it to safety before Silo 18 is saturated with deadly nanobots, claiming the life of Lukas.

Against the Silo's rules, Donald wakes his sister, Charlotte, who, along with a sympathetic security officer named Darcy, free Donald and try to escape Silo 1 together. Donald is dying and too weak to leave. He persuades Charlotte and Darcy to go without him while he plans to blow up Silo 1's reactor so that the other Silos are free from the tyranny of Thurman and Operation Fifty. Darcy sacrifices himself so Charlotte can make it out safely, just as Donald destroys Silo 1.

Meanwhile, Juliette discovers that all Silos possess a tunneling machine that, when activated, will connect them to a place designated "Seed". Silo 17's machine requires more fuel than is available, so Juliette and a group of willing survivors try to walk to Seed over the surface using modified pressurized cleaning suits and oxygen tanks. They emerge from a wall of dust and realize the world has already healed itself. It is revealed that the Silos are enshrouded by an artificial veil of toxic dust that is likely formed by nanobots, but beyond them, there is breathable air, clean water, and a thriving ecosystem. When Juliette and the survivors arrive at Seed, they find it is a sprawling bunker replete with everything needed to rebuild civilization: food, plant seeds, and other materials. Charlotte encounters the group, and Juliette invites her to join them to rebuild human civilization together.

== Reception ==
A reviewer for Wired praised the initial novellas, and their collective Wool omnibus, while also noting that their publication "clears away the grime of the past and reveals the new truth" about changes in the publishing industry.

== Adaptations ==
=== Film and television ===
Since its initial publication, attempts have been made to adapt the Wool series into a film or television series. Film rights for the story were sold in May 2012 to 20th Century Fox, and director Ridley Scott and Steve Zaillian were named as producers. This project never came to fruition due to the acquisition of 21st Century Fox by Disney. In July 2018, AMC announced LaToya Morgan would be adapting Wool for the network as a series. The series was later moved to Apple TV+. In May 2021, press releases were sent out stating that Graham Yost would write the series, Morten Tyldum would serve as director, and Rebecca Ferguson would star and serve as executive producer. Howey, Remi Aubuchon, Nina Jack, and Ingrid Escajeda also serve as executive producers. In August 2021, Tim Robbins joined the cast. Filming of the first season took place in Hoddesdon, Hertfordshire during late 2021 until spring 2022. The first season was released on Apple TV+ on May 5, 2023. The second season premiered on November 15, 2024. In December 2024, the series was renewed for both a third season, released on July 3, 2026, and a concluding fourth season.

=== Comic book adaptation ===
In July 2013, Amazon's new comic book imprint Jet City Comics announced it would release a comic book adaptation of the series. Jimmy Palmiotti and Justin Gray adapted the story, and Jimmy Broxton created the artwork. On July 9, 2013, Howey released a preview of the comic book's cover on his blog. The graphic novel was finally published in August 2014.

=== Kindle Worlds ===
The "Silo Saga" was one of the first settings licensed in 2013 for the Kindle Worlds platform for self-publishing fanfiction. By the time Kindle Worlds shuttered in 2018, 122 novels, novellas, and short stories set in the Silo universe had been published via the platform — the third most for any of the licensed series.

== See also ==
- The Penultimate Truth, a 1964 science fiction novel with a similar theme by Philip K. Dick
- The City of Ember, a 2003 children's dystopian novel with a similar setting in an underground city.
- Sexmission, 1984, movie about men awakened from hibernation in an underground society, where an autocratic government maintains that life on the surface is impossible due to contamination following a nuclear world war. The only way to see what Earth looks like is through a periscope view showing a reddish, barren landscape. The plot reveals that the image was faked and that life on the surface is actually possible.
