= Immortal Longings =

2023 romantic fantasy novel by Chloe Gong

- First edition cover
- Author: Chloe Gong
- Cover artist: Corey Brickley (UK cover)
- Language: English
- Series: Flesh and False Gods
- Genre: Romantic fantasy
- Publisher: Saga Press
- Publication date: 18 November 2023
- Publication place: New Zealand
- Pages: 372
- ISBN: 978-1668000229

Immortal Longings is a 2023 romantic fantasy and the debut adult novel by New Zealand author Chloe Gong. It was published through Saga Press in the United States on 18 July 2023, and Hodder & Stoughton in the United Kingdom on 25 July. Its audiobook, narrated by Jeena Yi, was published by Simon & Schuster Audio.

Loosely inspired by Shakespeare's Antony and Cleopatra, it follows Anton Makusa and Calla Tuoleimi, who live in the capital twin cities' capital, San-Er. Citizens can voluntarily participate in the kingdom of Tallinn's deadly annual competition for the opportunity to rise out of poverty.

Immortal Longings landed at number 14 on The New York Times bestsellers for Print Hardcover. It was a finalist in the category Best Romantasy at the 2024 Libby Book Awards. Gong drew inspiration from Kowloon Walled City for its setting, and incorporated the magical element of "jumping" (possessing) bodies, which harnesses one's own qi.

== Background ==
In 2022, it was announced of Hodder & Stoughton acquiring the rights to publish the trilogy along with Foul Lady Fortune.

Like These Violent Delights, Gong was inspired by Shakespeare. At the University of Pennsylvania, she took a course on the famed English playwright, and held a fascination for the character dynamics between Antony and Cleopatra, stating, "all of these big things he's saying about love and obsession and what that drives someone to [...] It is less a full adaptation of Shakespeare's play and more an adaptation of the kind of characters that Shakespeare wrote up". The premise of the trilogy was "themes of love, obsession, co-dependency—and whether anything good can survive in that sort of setting". Writing Immortal Longings during the COVID-19 pandemic, she observed how the number of deaths were beginning to be normalized; rather than society seeing the victims as people, they were reduced to numbers and statistics.

An exclusive excerpt was published by Cosmopolitan in June 2023.

== Plot ==
In the city of San-Er, (Note: San-Er is seen as a modernized hybrid of Ancient Rome and Kowloon Walled City.) corruption and poverty are rampant under the ruling royal empire. To maintain the system and grant hope among his subjects, King Kasa holds an annual gladiatorial competition for the impoverished, where participants must kill one another and be the sole survivor to receive life-changing wealth. Certain citizens also have the ability to take over other people's bodies using their life force, qi, with several caveats: no one can invade Weisannas' bodies, the original eye colour of the body-switcher does not change, and one can risk contracting the fatal yaisu sickness.

Anton Makusa enters the games to pay for his childhood lover's growing medical expenses, while Calla Tuoleimi seeks an end to the cruel regime by assassinating the king. Fortunately for Calla, her cousin August Shenzhi, heir to the throne, also wants his father dead. He aids Calla in the games, promising to pardon her crimes after the deed. Plans are complicated when Anton and Calla develop feelings for one another; ultimately, Calla chooses revenge over running away with Anton. She wins the games by killing him, then murders the king. However, Anton escapes death by taking over August's body, and is now seated on the throne.

== Characters ==
- Calla Tuoleimi (Cleopatra), former princess outlawed for committing parricide
- Anton Makusa (Mark Antony), the childhood acquaintance of August and exiled aristocrat
- August Shenzhi, the crown prince and adopted son of King Kasa; believes he can rule San-Er better than his father
- Galipei Weisanna, August's loyal bodyguard
- Chami and Yilas (Charmion and Iras), lovers and former royal attendants to Calla
- Pampi Magnes (Pompey Magnus), part of the Crescent Societies; slaughters innocent citizens to pass blame onto the Sicans
- Otta Avia, Prince August's half-sister and Anton's first love; in comatose but awakens

== Accolades ==
Award	Category	Result	Ref.
2024 Libby Book Awards	Romantasy	Finalist	

== Critical reception ==
Kirkus Reviews enthused, "spectacular worldbuilding, breathtaking action, and plenty of mischief". Alexandra Pierce of Locus appreciated the references to various historical figures and Shakespearean quotes, and called the world "rich and compelling".

Charmaine Lim of The Straits Times was less sanguine, calling the romance "awkwardly paced and developed", as well as the characterizations hardly being different from Gong's teenager protagonists. In similar sentiments, Fabienne Schwizer of Grimdark Magazine saw it being young adult, and added, "the pacing was a bit uneven, with the middle losing tension at times. The character arcs and the relationships between them felt a bit shallow, despite being set up with complex backstories that would have lent themselves to more depth. The story consistently confronted them with stakes higher than quite make sense given how they were portrayed".

== Sequels ==
The sequel, Vilest Things, was published in 2024, which follows Anton and Calla settling into their respective new roles as soon-to-be King August and his royal advisor. The conclusion, Eyes of Kings, is scheduled to be published in 2026.
