= Genevieve Gaunt =

Dutch-British actress (born 1991)

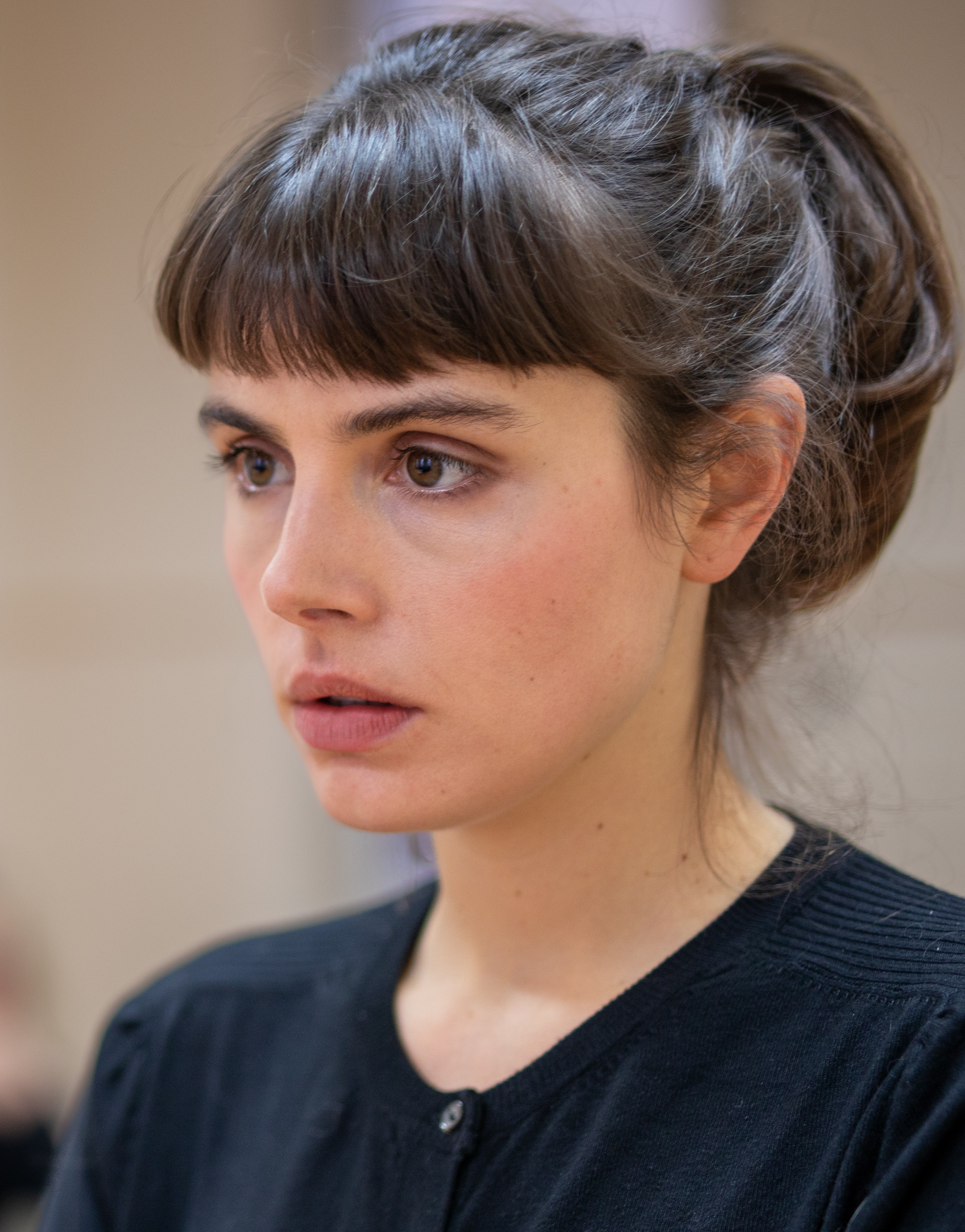
- Gaunt in 2022
- Born: Genevieve Wilhelmina Gaunt; 13 January 1991 (age 35); London, England
- Citizenship: Netherlands; United Kingdom
- Education: Newnham College, Cambridge
- Occupation: Actress
- Years active: 2004–present

Genevieve Wilhelmina Gaunt (born 13 January 1991) is a British actress of Scottish and Dutch heritage, voice over artist, and writer known for portraying Pansy Parkinson in Harry Potter and the Prisoner of Azkaban, Wilhelmina "Willow" Moreno Henstridge in The Royals and Marilyn Monroe in The Marilyn Conspiracy at Park Theatre.

== Early life ==
Gaunt was born and raised in London, England, the daughter of Scottish actress Fiona Gaunt and Dutch actor Frederik de Groot. Gaunt attended the Godolphin and Latymer School in London. She graduated with a double first in English from Newnham College, Cambridge.

== Career ==
=== Acting and audio ===
Gaunt narrated the first eight audiobooks in "The Unselected Journals of Emma M. Lion" series by Beth Brower, which were released in 2025. Gaunt also narrated "The Spy Who Loved Me" by Ian Fleming as part of a set of audiobook recordings released in January 2025.

Gaunt voiced a singing muppet Binko in Cunk On Life for the BBC starring Diane Morgan. It aired in January 2025, created by Charlie Brooker and directed by Al Campbell.

Gaunt portrayed Marilyn Monroe in the 2024 theatre production The Marilyn Conspiracy, directed and co-written by Guy Masterson.

in 2024 Gaunt portrayed young Diane Keaton in Sky Cinema's film Arthur's Whisky starring Diane Keaton, Patricia Hodge, Lulu, Boy George, David Harewood, Bill Patterson and Lawrence Chaney.

Gaunt portrayed Pansy Parkinson in Harry Potter and the Prisoner of Azkaban and Jessica Fuller in The Face of an Angel. She portrayed Princess Isabella in Knightfall in 2019 and Wilhelmina "Willow" Moreno on The Royals from 2015 to 2018.

In 2022 she led new play Ghosts of the Titanic by Ron Hutchinson at The Park Theatre and Lyric Theatre, Belfast.

In October 2022 Dame Harriet Walter and Gaunt performed a staged reading of The Dame and the Showgirl by Simon Berry at The Criterion Theatre, Piccadilly. The play is about the meeting between Dame Edith Sitwell and Marilyn Monroe. The play was previously produced as an audiodrama in 2021 for Audible with Emma Thompson and Sinead Matthews.

In 2020 Gaunt narrated The Discomfort of Evening (Winner of the Booker Prize International) and played the lead little boy in Code Name Bananas by David Walliams. Gaunt is the voice of Lady Penelope and Grandma Tracy in Thunderbirds.

In October 2022 Gaunt narrated Maggie O'Farrell's novel The Marriage Portrait for which she won the AudioFile Magazine Earphones Award. Her narration of The Memory of Animals by Clare Fuller won the AudioFile Magazine Earphones Award in 2023.

=== Writing and broadcasting ===
In 2021, Gaunt produced podcast The Cupid Couch, in which she interviewed Rose McGowan, Buck Angel and Kathy Lette. It was listed by The Radio Times in their '34 Best Podcasts of 2021'.

In October 2022 Gaunt co-curated The Braemar Literary Festival at The Fife Arms in Scotland with HM the Queen Consort's 'Reading Room', St Margaret's, local cultural partners and Tom Parker Bowles. Guests included Sebastian Faulks, Jeremy Lee, Angela Hartnett, Jackie Kay, Ian Rankin, Sam Leith, Dr Frank Tallis, Justine Picardie, Stephen Page and Kate Mosse.

Gaunt interviews writers and creatives such as Amor Towles, Patrick Radden Keefe, Kathryn Hunter and Julia Masli for film and culture magazine, A Rabbit's Foot,

Gaunt adapted Thunderbirds comic Mr Steelman (original comic by Alan Fennell) for audiodrama as part of the seriesDanger and Deception for release in January 2024.

Gaunt writes book reviews for The Spectator.

== Filmography ==
=== Theatre ===
Year	Title	Role	Director	Notes
2013	Assassins by Stephen Sondheim	Lynette 'Squeaky' Fromme	Maria Montague	Edinburgh Festival
2015	French Without Tears by Terence Rattigan	Diana Lake	Paul Miller	Orange Tree Theatre
2018	Monogamy by Torben Betts	Amanda	Alastair Whatley	Park Theatre
2022	Ghosts of the Titanic by Ron Hutchinson	Emma Hinton	Eoin O'Callaghan	Park Theatre
2022	The Dame and the Showgirl by Simon Berry, with Dame Harriet Walter (reading)	Marilyn Monroe	Harry Burton	The Criterion, West End
2022	Thunderbirds Concert: Stand by for Action	Lady Penelope	Jamie Anderson	Birmingham Symphony Hall
2023	House of the Wicked by Torben Betts (reading)	Marilyn Monroe	Sir Trevor Nunn	National Theatre
2024	The Marilyn Conspiracy by Vicki McKellar	Marilyn Monroe	Guy Masterson	Park Theatre

=== Radio ===
Year	Title	Notes
2020	The USA Trilogy by John Dos Passos	BBC R4
2021	The Magic Mountain by Thomas Mann	BBC R4
2022	Macbeth (With David Tennant)	BBC R4
2022	Pretty Vacant (With Tim McInnerny)	BBC R4
2022	Ghosts of the Titanic by Ron Hutchinson	BBC R4
2022	The Painted Hall (With Hugh Bonneville)	BBC R4
2022	The Age of Anxiety by W.H Auden	BBC R3
2022	A Town Called Solace by Mary Lawson	BBC R4
2023	Macbeth with David Tennant	BBC R4
2023	Twelfth Night with Toby Jones	BBC R4

=== Audiobooks ===
Year	Title
2020	Code Name Bananas by David Walliams
2020	The Discomfort of Evening (Winner of the Booker Prize International 2020)
2021	Lampie by Annet Schaap
2021	Magma by Thora Hjörleifsdóttir
2022	The Kiss by Santa Montefiore
2022	An Italian Girl in Brooklyn by Santa Montefiore
2021	The Heights by Louise Candlish
2022	The Marriage Portrait by Maggie O'Farrell (WINNER of the AudioFile Earphones Award for Best Narration)
2023	Cursed Bread by Sophie Mackintosh
2023	The Memory of Animals by Claire Fuller
2023	The Black Feathers by Rebecca Netley
2023	Code Name Kingfisher by Liz Kessler
2023	Maude Horton's Glorious Revenge by Lizzie Pook
2023	Fervour by Toby Lloyd
2025	First Action Bureau: Damaged Goods by Richard James
2025	The Unselected Journals of Emma M. Lion, volumes 1 through 8 by Beth Brower

=== Audiodrama ===
Year	Title
2021	Ask Arizona Children's Series (Audible)
2021	Soft Voice (QCode)
2022	Medea by Euripides (Open University)
2021	Ajax by Sophocles (Open University)
2021–2022	Thunderbirds: Terror from the Stars, Operation Asteroids, Peril in Peru, The Space Mirror, The Vanishing Ray, Brains is Dead, Blazing Danger (Anderson Entertainment)
2017–2022	Doctor Who: The Silent City, Warlock's Cross, The Helliax Rift, Red Planets (Big Finish)
2021	Fireball XL5 (Anderson Entertainment)
2020	First Action Bureau (Anderson Entertainment)
2019	The Prisoner (Big Finish)
2019	The Human Frontier (Big Finish)
2018	The Waringham Chronicles (Audible)

=== Film ===
Year	Title	Role	Director
2004	Harry Potter and the Prisoner of Azkaban	Pansy Parkinson	Alfonso Cuaron
2010	Between You & Me	Eleanor	
2010	Hippie Hippie Shake	Trudi	Beeban Kidron
2011	There I Am	Ruth	
2012	The End	Madeleine	
2014	The Face of an Angel	Jessica Fuller	Michael Winterbottom
2014	Falcon	Martine	
2015	Dusty and Me	Chrissie	Betsan Morris Evans
2016	Kids in Love	Issie	Chris Foggin
2016	The Last Dragonslayer	Hermione Twizzle	Jamie Stone
2018	The Mercy	Miss Teignmouth	James Marsh
2024	Strictly Confidential	Jemma	Damian Hurley
2024	Arthur's Whisky	Young Linda	

=== Television ===
Year	Title	Role	Notes
2008	Heartbeat	Vivienne Middleton	Episode: "Hey Hey LBJ"
2008	Lost in Austen	Georgiana	Episode #1.3
2009	Land Girls	Susan Sykes	Episode: "Destinies"
2015	Father Brown	Young Evelyn	Episode: "The Curse of Amenhotep"
2015–2018	The Royals	Wilhelmina "Willow" Moreno Henstridge	Recurring role (season 2); main role (seasons 3–4)
2019	Knightfall	Princess Isabella	Recurring role (season 2)

== Awards ==
- Sylvia Kristel Award (2015)
- Earphones Award for Audiobook Narration 2023, The Memory of Animals by Clare Fuller.
- Earphones Award for Audiobook Narration 2022, The Marriage Portrait by Maggie O'Farrell.
