= Coldwire =

2025 dystopian novel by Chloe Gong

- First edition cover
- Author: Chloe Gong
- Cover artist: Sean & Eve
- Language: English
- Series: The StrangeLoom Trilogy
- Genre: Science fiction; young adult
- Publisher: Margaret K. McElderry
- Publication date: 4 November 2025
- Publication place: New Zealand
- Pages: 496
- ISBN: 978-1665960137
- Followed by: Deadlock

Coldwire is a 2025 young adult dystopian cyberpunk novel by New Zealand author Chloe Gong. The first book in The StrangeLoom Trilogy, it is told through the alternating perspectives of Eirale and Lia, who live in a virtual reality world owned by the conglomerate NileCorp.

Coldwire was published by Margaret K. McElderry on 4 November 2025, and became a New York Times and Sunday Times bestseller. It was a Young Adult Good Morning America book club pick. The audiobook version was narrated by Shannon Tyo and released by Simon & Schuster Audio. The sequel, Deadlock, was released in November 2026.

== Background ==
In 2024, Gong announced she was working on her next series, "a new dystopian cyberpunk trilogy". The trilogy was acquired by Hodderscape, who would publish it in the United Kingdom simultaneously with Margaret K McElderry Books, who distribute to the rest of the world.

The author grew up reading young adult dystopian novels, including The Hunger Games and Divergent. The idea of a virtual world floated in her mind for a while, though she was unable to fully envision it until her senior year of college during the COVID-19 pandemic. She credited the text, "Techno-Orientalism: Imagining Asia in Speculative Fiction, History, and Media", as her first real dive into cyberpunk, interested in why the genre contains strong Asian influences.

Gong compared the difference in her writing process to These Violent Delights, where the latter was historical so she began with research, while the dystopian genre granted more freedom. A central plot was "bilateral international relations", where she elaborated, "Many of my favorite sci-fi and dystopian books explore one government and its impact on the masses. What if, instead, it was about two governments at war, and the people who live in that shadow?" Although the two protagonists are Medan, they consider themselves to be Atahuan and are loyal to the nation. The futuristic elements Gong incoporated has also seen real-life technological advancements, to which she remarked, "It feels like we are very rapidly heading toward that future, and especially Gen Z is looking at it in a way where it's no longer an unbelievable story, it's just a very near future take".

People published an exclusive in February 2025, unveiling the book cover. Cosmopolitan published an exclusive excerpt on 2 October 2025, followed by Screen Rant on 29 October.

== Plot ==
Leaving Earth in a dire state, humanity now occupies the two countries, Atahua and Medaluo, which are embroiled in a cold war. Medan orphans in Atahua are required to attend Nile Military Academy to serve as soldiers. Society is divided into two classes: upcountry (virtual reality) and downcountry (real-world).

When Eirale, an orphan of war turned soldier gets framed by Atahua's most-wanted anarchist for the assassination of a government official, she must cooperate in searching for a dangerous program in Medaluo. Elsewhere, Lia, a military academy student residing in upcountry, is sent on a mission alongside her academic archenemy to infiltrate Medaluo and track down an AI weapon.

== Critical reception ==
Kirkus Reviews called it "inventive and engaging", penning, "this series opener maintains a crackling pace, with inventive worldbuilding and a cleverly executed reveal. The characters, while largely well developed, occasionally feel like stock players, however. Atahuans present as white, while Medans read Asian". Publishers Weekly stated how the author "capably explores themes of diaspora, corporate control, and artificial intelligence while spinning a labyrinthine mystery with a sprinkle of romance". They continued how Coldwire starts off slow-paced, though "gives way to a tightly paced climax and a juicy sequel hook".
