= Hugh Howey =

American writer

- Hugh Howey in 2021
- Born: 1975 (age 50–51); Charlotte, North Carolina, U.S.
- Occupation: Writer
- Spouse: Shay Londre (m. 2022)
- Writing career
- Years active: 2009–present
- Genre: Science fiction
- Website: hughhowey.com

Hugh C. Howey (born 1975) is an American writer. He is the author of the books Wool, Shift, and Dust, which the science fiction series Silo (Apple TV) is based upon. He published the books independently through Amazon.com's Kindle Direct Publishing system. Although he has since signed distribution deals with large publishing houses around the world, he has continued to maintain the publishing rights and direct control over all e-book publishing.

== Personal life ==
Howey was born in 1975 in Charlotte, North Carolina, and was raised in Monroe, North Carolina. Before publishing his books, he worked as a book store clerk, yacht captain, roofer, and audio technician.

In mid-2015, Howey moved to St Francis Bay, Eastern Cape, South Africa. He commissioned the construction of a sailing catamaran, on which he sailed from Cape Town to Australia. In November 2022, Howey married pilot and former model Shay Londre. They live in New York City.

In September 2026, Howey was appointed to the board of Automattic.

== Wool ==
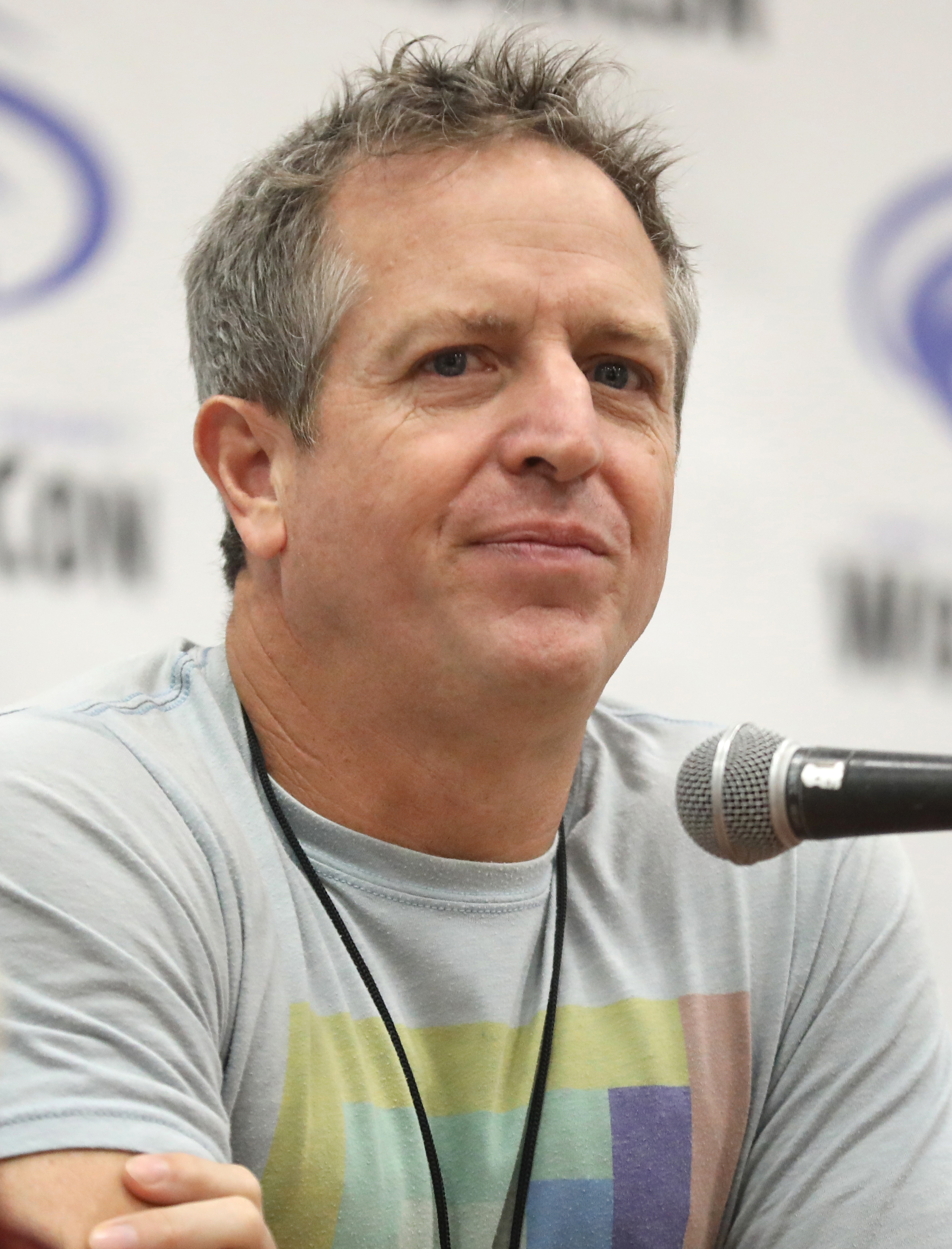
Howey discussing Wool at the 2024 WonderCon

Howey began the series in 2011, initially writing Wool as a standalone short story. His first book was initially published with a small press. After that, he decided to publish through Amazon.com's Kindle Direct Publishing system because of the freedom of self-publishing. After the series grew in popularity, he began to write more entries for it. Howey began soliciting international rights in 2012, including signing a deal for Brazil. Film rights to the series were sold to 20th Century Fox; Lionsgate also expressed interest.

In 2012, Howey signed a deal with Simon & Schuster to distribute Wool to book retailers across the US and Canada. The deal allowed Howey to continue to sell the book online exclusively. He turned down seven-figure offers in favor of a mid-six figure sum, in return for maintaining e-book rights.

He has also signed publishing contracts with Random House Century UK for UK distribution of both his Wool and Sand series, published as novels of the same names.

Howey became closely tied to Amazon and Kindle Direct Publishing, and self-publishing as a leader. He opened up his Silo Saga to other authors, formalizing that effort when he signed with Kindle Worlds. Though authors like Fredric Shernoff (Atlantic Island), Jason Gurley (Eleanor), and Michael Bunker (Pennsylvania) all experienced some degree of success that can be attributed to Howey, Wool, and the Kindle Worlds project, nobody was able to replicate Wool's success either through tie-in books or those authors' original stories.

== Bibliography ==
=== Novels ===
Silo series:

1. Wool (2012), fix-up novel of one short story and four novellas:
  "Wool: Holston" (short story), "Wool: Proper Gauge" (novella), "Wool: Casting Off" (novella), "Wool: The Unraveling" (novella), "Wool: The Stranded" (novella)
2. Shift (2013), prequel, fix-up novel of three novellas:
  "First Shift: Legacy", "Second Shift: Order", "Third Shift: Pact"
3. Dust (2013)

The Sand Chronicles:

1. Sand (2014), fix-up novel of five novellas:
  "The Belt of the Buried Gods", "Out of No Man's Land", "Return to Danvar", "Thunder Due East", "A Rap Upon Heaven's Gate"
2. Across the Sand (2022)

Stand-alones:

- I, Zombie (2012)
- The Shell Collector (2014)
- Beacon 23 (2015), fix-up novel of five short stories:
  "Beacon 23: Part One: Little Noises", "Beacon 23: Part Two: Pet Rocks", "Beacon 23: Part Three: Bounty", "Beacon 23: Part Four: Company", "Beacon 23: Part Five: Visitor"

=== Young adult novels ===
Bern Saga:

1. Molly Fyde and the Parsona Rescue (2009)
2. Molly Fyde and the Land of Light (2010)
3. Molly Fyde and the Blood of Billions (2010)
4. Molly Fyde and the Fight for Peace (2010)
5. Molly Fyde and the Darkness Deep (TBA)

Stand-alones:

- Half Way Home (2010)
- The Hurricane (2011)

=== Short stories ===
Collections:

- Machine Learning: New and Collected Stories (2017), collection of 16 short stories and five novelettes/novellas:
  "The Walk Up Nameless Ridge", "Second Suicide" (novelette), "Nothing Goes to Waste", "Deep Blood Kettle", "Machine Learning", "Executable", "The Box", "Glitch" (novelette), "In the Air" (Silo series), "In the Mountains" (Silo series), "In the Woods" (novelette, Silo series), "Hell from the East", "The Black Beast", "The Good God", "The Automated Ones", "Mouth Breathers", "WHILE (u > i) i--;", "The Plagiarist" (novella), "Select Character", "Promises of London", "Peace in Amber" (novelette)

Silo series:

- "In the Air" (2014)
- "In the Mountains" (2014)
- "In the Woods" (2015), novelette

Uncollected short stories:

- "Gloria" (2015)
- "Full Unemployment" (2017)
- "The Blast" (2018)
- "No Algorithms in the World" (2019)
- "Bones of Gossamer" (2019)

=== Children's books ===
- Misty: The Proud Cloud (2014), picture book illustrated by Nidhi Chanani

=== Comics ===
- Wool: The Graphic Novel (2014), with Jimmy Palmiotti and Justin Gray, illustrated by Jimmy Broxton, ISBN 1-47784-912-2

=== Non-fiction ===
Wayfinding series:

1. Wayfinding Part 1: Rats and Rafts (2015)
2. Wayfinding Part 2: Hell and Heaven (2015)
3. Wayfinding Part 3: Hot & Cold (2015)
4. Wayfinding Part 4: Old World & New (2015)
5. Wayfinding Part 5: Consciousness and Subconsciousness (2015)
6. Wayfinding Part 6: Highs and Lows (2015)
- Wayfinding - Food and Fitness (2015)

=== As editor ===
The Apocalypse Triptych, with John Joseph Adams:

1. The End is Nigh (2014)
2. The End is Now (2014)
3. The End Has Come (2015)

The Best American Science Fiction and Fantasy (2024), with John Joseph Adams

== Filmography ==
=== Television ===
==== Wool ====
Production on the serialization of Wool was announced in 2012. After development was begun by AMC, the project was moved to Apple TV+ in May 2021, and the ten-episode first season began streaming in May 2023.

==== Beacon 23 ====
In 2018 it was announced that the Beacon 23 series was going to be adapted into a television series. Filming began in 2022, and the series premiered on MGM+ in November 2023.
