= Dusty and Me =

- Directed by: Betsan Morris Evans
- Written by: Rob Isted
- Starring: Luke Newberry; Genevieve Gaunt; Ian Hart; Lesley Sharp; Lee Ross; Ben Batt; Iain Glen
- Release date: 2016
- Running time: 94 minutes
- Country: United Kingdom
- Language: English

Dusty and Me is a 2016 British comedy film written by Rob Isted, directed by Betsan Morris Evans and starring Luke Newberry, Genevieve Gaunt, Ian Hart, Lesley Sharp, Lee Ross, Ben Batt and Iain Glen.

== Cast ==
- Luke Newberry as Derek (Dusty)
- Genevieve Gaunt as Chrissie
- Ben Batt as Little Eddie
- Christian Foster as Alfie
- Billy Geraghty as Frankie
- Iain Glen as Mickey the Bubble
- Ian Hart as Big Eddie
- Sophie Mercer as Judy
- Vanessa Peers as Winnie
- Tom Prior as Georgie
- Lee Ross as Bill
- Lesley Sharp as Lil
- Nicola Stapleton as Sophie
- Geraldine Sharrock as Tracy

== Reception ==
The film has a 13% rating on Rotten Tomatoes based on eight reviews. Peter Bradshaw of The Guardian awarded the film two stars out of five. Ed Potton of The Times also awarded the film two stars out of five.
