= Rainbow Town =

- Produced by: Lauren Selmon Roberts
- Release date: 2010
- Country: Liberia
- Language: English

Rainbow Town is a 2010 Liberian documentary, directed by Lauren Selmon Roberts.

== Summary ==
In a war torn country where people are being killed and their children are left as orphans, the orphans are often not able to bear the challenges that comes their way, so they start dying as time goes on. It took one woman who empowered the orphans to believe that there is light after the tunnel despite the challenges they face.

== Cast ==
- Ellen Johnson Sirleaf
- Taylor Johnson
- Alice Joseph
- Faith Kolleh
