= Luke Newberry =

English actor

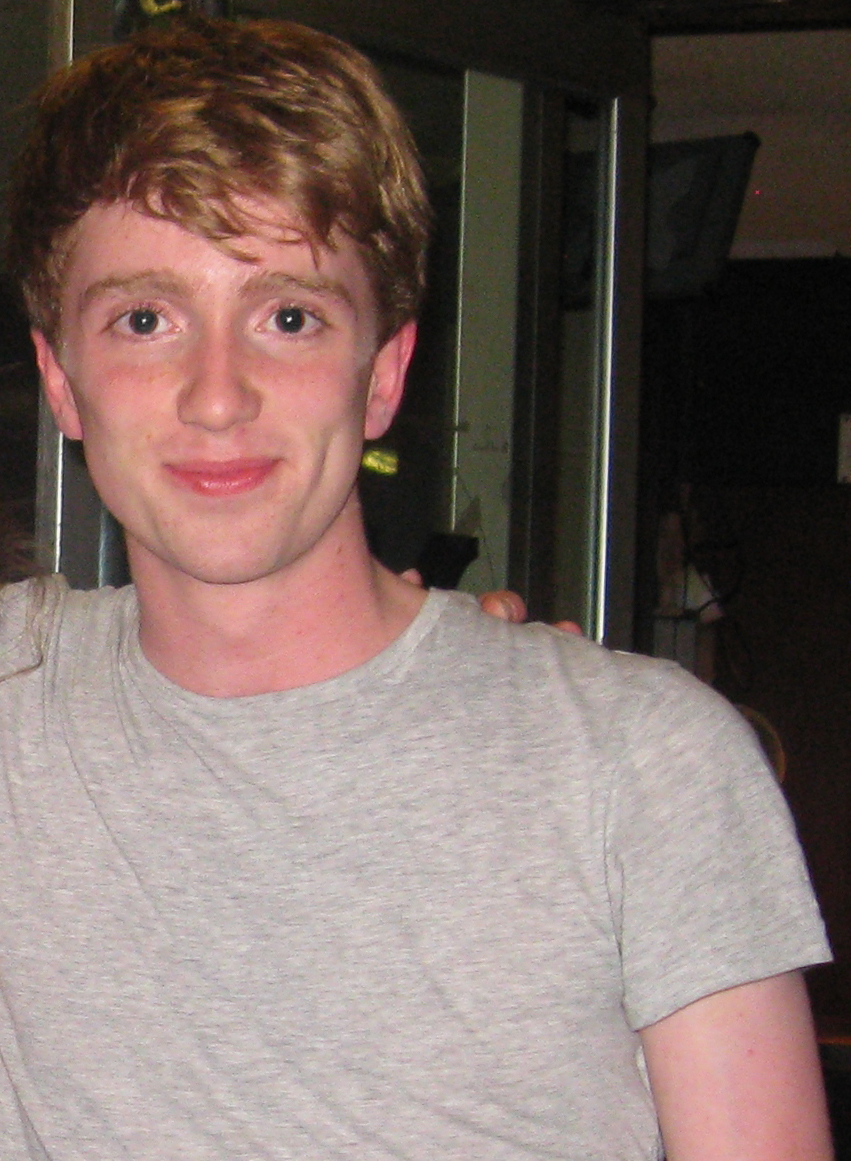
- Newberry in May 2012
- Born: Exeter, England
- Occupation: Actor
- Years active: 1997–present

Luke Newberry is an English actor. He is known for his leading role in the drama television series In the Flesh (2013–2014), which earned him a British Academy Television Award nomination.

== Early life ==
Newberry has two older sisters. He attended Exeter College, where he studied filmmaking, fine art, and English literature, and played the lead role in a college production of Hamlet. Aged 18, he attended the prestigious Bristol Old Vic Theatre School to study acting, graduating in 2011.

== Career ==
Newberry was first signed with an agent aged seven. At age 11, he played the role of Anthony in the film The Heart of Me. In 2010 Newberry was cast to play Teddy Lupin in Harry Potter and the Deathly Hallows – Part 2 but was cut from the final film. He has acted on stage, playing Haemon in Sophocles' Antigone at the National Theatre. In 2015, Newberry played the lead role of Gabe in Teddy Ferrara at the Donmar Warehouse.

In 2013, Newberry starred in the leading role of the BBC Three supernatural drama In the Flesh. He was nominated for the BAFTA Award for Best Actor for Series 1 in 2014, and Series 2 began airing on BBC Three in the same year. Newberry was also nominated for Best Actor at the RTS Awards 2014.

In 2013, Newberry was one of Screen International's Stars of Tomorrow. He starred in the film Dusty and Me.

== Charity work ==
Newberry is a supporter of the HeForShe feminism campaign.

== Filmography ==
=== Film ===
Year	Title	Role	Notes
1997	Alone	Jason	
2002	The Heart of Me	Anthony	
2008	It's Better Now	Tom	
2011	Harry Potter and the Deathly Hallows – Part 2	Teddy Lupin	Scenes cut
2012	All Men's Dead	William	
2012	8 Minutes Idle	Jonno	
2012	Eradicate	Youngest son	
2012	Anna Karenina	Vasily Lukich	
2012	Quartet	Simon	
2013	Dance for Me	Rodney	
2013	Frankenstein's Army	Sacha	
2014	Hercules: The Legend Begins	Agamemnon	
2018	Dusty and Me	Derek Springfield	
2018	Dead Birds	Saint Sebastian	
2018	Futures	Teddy	Short
TBA	Lead Heads		Filming

=== Television ===
Year	Title	Role	Notes
2000	Thin Ice	Charlie	Television film
2003–2004	My Dad's the Prime Minister	Lighthouse	
2007	Doctors	Luke Brown	Episode: "Kiss and Tell"
2012	Sherlock	Young policeman	Episode: "A Scandal in Belgravia"
2013	Lightfields	Harry Dunn	
2013	Mrs Biggs	Gordon	
2013–2014	In the Flesh	Kieren Walker	
2014	Suspects	Nate Turner	2 episodes
2015	Banana	Josh	
2015	From Darkness	Anthony Boyce	
2016	To Walk Invisible	George Smith	
2017	Death in Paradise	Steve Thomas	2 episodes "Man Overboard"
2020	The Singapore Grip	Monty Blackett	6 episodes
2022	Gentleman Jack	John Harper	2 episodes
2026	The Hairdresser Mysteries	Sammy Marigold	Episode: "The Immortal Mrs Marigold"

=== Stage ===
Year	Title	Venue
2001	The Secret Garden	RSC
2006	God Save The Teen	National Youth Theatre
2011	The Aliens	Trafalgar Studios
2012	Finer Noble Gases	Theatre Royal Haymarket
2012	Antigone	National Theatre
2013	A Little Hotel on the Side	Theatre Royal Bath
2015	Teddy Ferrara	Donmar Warehouse
2016	The Intelligent Homosexual's Guide to Capitalism and Socialism with a Key to the Scriptures	Hampstead Theatre
2018	Macbeth	RSC
2018	The Merry Wives of Windsor	RSC

=== Radio ===
Year	Title	Channel
1998	The Greengage Summer	BBC Radio 4
2003	Jennings and Darbyshire	BBC Radio 4
2005	The Papers of AJ Wentworth	BBC Radio 4
2011	Do You Like Banana Comrades?	BBC Radio 4
2015	John Gabriel Borkman	BBC Radio 4
2017	Breaking up with Bradford	BBC Radio 4
2017	Roderick Hudson (title role)	BBC Radio 4
2018	Neil Gaiman’s Norse Mythology	BBC Radio 4

=== Music videos ===
Year	Title	Artist
2015	"Wherever I Go"	Mark Knopfler

== Awards and nominations ==
Year	Award	Category	Nominated work	Result
2014	British Academy Television Awards	Best Actor	In the Flesh	Nominated
2019	Ian Charleson Awards	–	Macbeth	Third
