= Our Violent Ends =

2021 fantasy novel by Chloe Gong

- Cover of the 2021 Margaret K. McElderry Books edition
- Author: Chloe Gong
- Language: English
- Series: Secret Shanghai
- Genre: Fiction; romantic fantasy
- Publisher: Margaret K. McElderry
- Publication date: 16 November 2021
- Publication place: New Zealand
- Pages: 494
- ISBN: 978-1529344561
- Preceded by: These Violent Delights
- Followed by: Foul Lady Fortune

Our Violent Ends is a 2021 romantic fantasy novel by Chloe Gong, published by Margaret K. McElderry on 16 November 2021. Serving as the sequel to These Violent Delights and conclusion to the duology, it has been four months since the viral outbreak. Juliette and Roma remain at odds and must reconcile to rescue their home and loved ones.

Gong said of the overall premise, "are Roma and Juliette brave enough to choose love? If they are, then yes, they can overcome. But, on top of that, there's also [the question]: can they overcome it in a city like this?" Like its predecessor, Our Violent Ends was an instant New York Times bestseller. It was nominated for Readers' Favorite Young Adult Fantasy & Science Fiction at the 2021 Goodreads Choice Awards. The spin-off series, Foul Lady Fortune, takes place several years after. It follows the adventures of Rosalind Lang, who becomes a deadly assassin.

== Plot ==
Following the events of the first book, Shanghai is relatively back to normal. Tensions between the gangs, the Scarlets and the White Flowers, are heightened. Roma believes Juliette killed his best friend, Marshall, and lied about her feelings for him. Juliette doesn't tell the truth in order to protect him. A new threat appears, where both gangs are blackmailed by an anonymous party who demands money and weapons. While the Scarlets comply, the White Flowers refuse to do so and consequently have several of their members killed.

Juliette wants the Scarlets to create a vaccine and distribute it to everyone, so their enemy won't have leverage, though her cousin Tyler disagrees, believing they should capitalize off it. He remains suspicious that Juliette isn't loyal to the Scarlets. Meanwhile, her cousin Celia works undercover to siphon information as she attends Communist meetings.

Roma and Juliette temporarily put their differences aside to do operative work into the French Concession. Elsewhere, Benedikt becomes depressed over Marshall's death and realises he loves him. Unbeknownst to him, Marshall has been out of hiding to keep an eye on him.

In a deadly showdown between Roma and Tyler, Juliette kills the latter. Benedikt and Marshall reunite and confess their feelings for each other. Juliette and Roma orchestrate a plan that stops Dimitri Voronin, where they end up sacrificing themselves, presumed dead.

== Accolades ==
Award	Category	Result	Ref.
2021 Goodreads Choice Awards	Young Adult Fantasy & Science Fiction	Nominated	

== Critical reception ==
Kirkus Reviews named it a "tightly plotted sequel", with supporting characters that provide pivotal roles "blend[ing] seamlessly into Roma's and Juliette's storylines".
