= John Joseph Adams =

American editor, critic and publisher (born 1976)

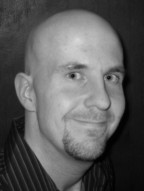
- Born: July 31, 1976 (age 50)
- Occupations: Editor, journalist, essayist
- Writing career
- Genres: Science fiction, fantasy
- Website: johnjosephadams.com

John Joseph Adams (born July 31, 1976) is an American science fiction and fantasy editor, critic, and publisher.

== Career ==
=== Editor ===
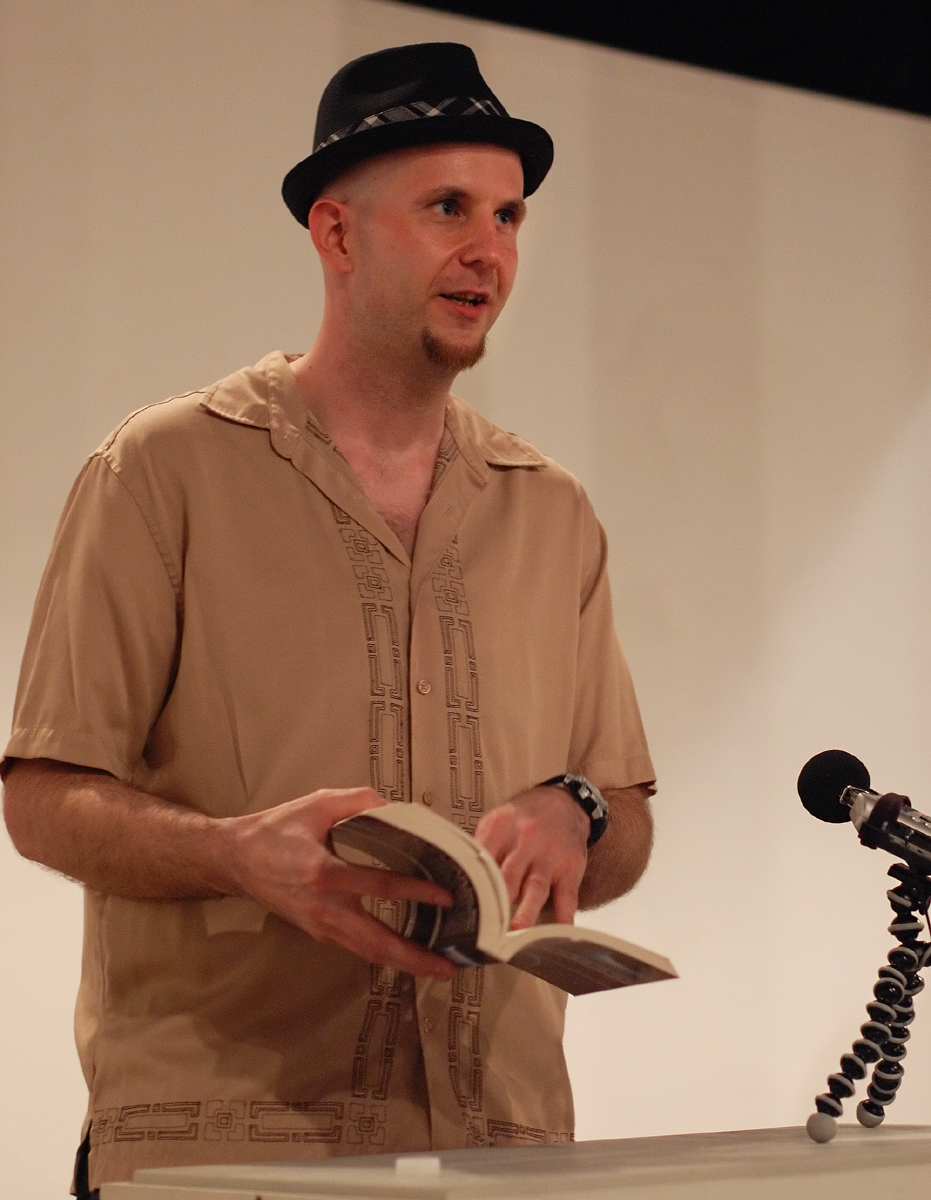
Adams in 2009

Adams worked as Assistant Editor at The Magazine of Fantasy & Science Fiction from May 2001 to December 2009. In January 2010 he left F&SF to edit Lightspeed Magazine, an online science fiction magazine which launched June 1, 2010. In March 2011, he took charge of its sister magazine, Fantasy Magazine. In June 2012, Adams and Creeping Hemlock Press successfully closed a $7,500 Kickstarter campaign for funding Nightmare Magazine, the first issue of which released October 2012. Originally the co-publisher and editor-in-chief, Adams now serves as publisher.

=== Publisher ===
In November 2011, Adams purchased Lightspeed and Fantasy Magazine from Sean Wallace of Prime Books. With the January 2012 issue, the first published under Adams's ownership, the content of both magazines was combined under the Lightspeed masthead, and Fantasy Magazine was discontinued as an entity. The Fantasy Magazine staff was also absorbed into Lightspeed.

In 2015, Adams became the editor-at-large of John Joseph Adams Books in partnership with Houghton Mifflin Harcourt.

=== Podcaster ===
Since January 2010 Adams and science fiction author David Barr Kirtley have produced and hosted Geek's Guide to the Galaxy.

== Accolades ==
His anthology The Living Dead was named one of the "Best Books of the Year" by Publishers Weekly. He has been called "The reigning king of the anthology world" by Barnes & Noble.com, and in 2011 he was named one of "100+ Geeks to Follow on Twitter" by TechRepublic.

Work	Year & Award	Category	Result	Ref.
Wastelands: Stories of the Apocalypse	2009 Locus Award	Anthology	Nominated	
Wastelands: Stories of the Apocalypse	2010 FantLab's Book of the Year Award	Anthology	Nominated	
The Living Dead	2009 World Fantasy Award	Anthology	Nominated	
The Living Dead	2009 FantLab's Book of the Year Award	Anthology	Won	
The Improbable Adventures of Sherlock Holmes	2010 Locus Award	Anthology	Nominated	
Federations	2010 Locus Award	Anthology	Nominated	
The Way of the Wizard	2011 Locus Award	Anthology	Nominated	
The Way of the Wizard	2011 World Fantasy Award	Anthology	Nominated	
Lightspeed	2011 Hugo Award	Professional Editor (Short Form)	Nominated	
Lightspeed	2012 Hugo Award	Professional Editor (Short Form)	Nominated	
Lightspeed	2013 Hugo Award	Professional Editor (Short Form)	Nominated	
Lightspeed	2014 Hugo Award	Professional Editor (Short Form)	Nominated	
Lightspeed	2014 Hugo Award	Semiprozine	Won	
Lightspeed	2015 Hugo Award	Semiprozine	Won	
Lightspeed	2016 Hugo Award	Professional Editor (Short Form)	Nominated	
Lightspeed	2017 Hugo Award	Professional Editor (Short Form)	Nominated	
Lightspeed	2018 Hugo Award	Professional Editor (Short Form)	Nominated	
Lightspeed	2015 British Fantasy Award	Magazine/Periodical	Nominated	
Epic: Legends of Fantasy	2013 Locus Award	Anthology	Nominated	
Epic: Legends of Fantasy	2013 World Fantasy Award	Anthology	Nominated	
The Best American Science Fiction and Fantasy 2016 (with Karen Joy Fowler)	2017 World Fantasy Award	Anthology	Nominated	
Cosmic Powers	2018 Locus Award	Anthology	Nominated	
A People's Future of the United States	2020 Locus Award	Anthology	Nominated	
A People's Future of the United States	2020 Ignyte Awards	Anthology/Collected Works	Finalist	
Out There Screaming: An Anthology of New Black Horror (with Jordan Peele)	2023 Bram Stoker Award	Anthology	Won	
Out There Screaming: An Anthology of New Black Horror (with Jordan Peele)	2024 British Fantasy Award	Anthology	Won	
Out There Screaming: An Anthology of New Black Horror (with Jordan Peele)	2024 Locus Award	Anthology	Won	
Out There Screaming: An Anthology of New Black Horror (with Jordan Peele)	2024 World Fantasy Award	Anthology	Nominated	
Out There Screaming: An Anthology of New Black Horror (with Jordan Peele)	2024 Ignyte Awards	Anthology/Collected Works	Finalist	
Out There Screaming: An Anthology of New Black Horror (with Jordan Peele)	2024 Kitschies	Inky Tentacle (Best Cover Art)	Won	

== Bibliography ==
=== Short fiction ===
Anthologies edited

- Wastelands: Stories of the Apocalypse (Night Shade Books, January 2008)
- Seeds of Change (Prime Books, August 2008)
- The Living Dead (Night Shade Books, September 2008)
- Federations (Prime Books, May 2009)
- By Blood We Live (Night Shade Books, August 2009)
- The Improbable Adventures of Sherlock Holmes (Night Shade Books, September 2009)
- The Living Dead 2 (Night Shade Books, September 2010)
- The Way of the Wizard (Prime Books, November 2010)
- Lightspeed: Year One (Prime Books, November 2011)
- Under the Moons of Mars: New Adventures on Barsoom (Simon & Schuster, February 2012)
- Armored (Baen Books, March 2012)
- Other Worlds Than These (Night Shade Books, July 2012)
- Epic: Legends of Fantasy (Tachyon Publications, November 2012).
- Brave New Worlds (Night Shade Books, 2nd edition December 2012)
- Oz Reimagined: New Tales from the Emerald City and Beyond (47North, February 2013)
- The Mad Scientist's Guide to World Domination (Tor Books, February 19, 2013)
- Robot Uprisings (April 2014) (with Daniel H. Wilson)
- Dead Man's Hand: An Anthology of the Weird West (Titan Books, May 2014)
- Help Fund My Robot Army!!! and Other Improbable Crowdfunding Projects (June 2014)
- The Apocalypse Triptych (2014 - 2015, with Hugh Howey)
- Wastelands 2: More Stories of the Apocalypse (Titan Books, February 2015)
- Operation Arcana (Baen Books, March 2015)
- The Best American Science Fiction and Fantasy 2015 (Mariner Books, 2015) (with Joe Hill)
- Loosed Upon the World: The Saga Anthology of Climate Fiction (2015)
- Press Start to Play (Vintage Books, August 2015) (with Daniel H. Wilson)
- The Best American Science Fiction and Fantasy 2016 (Mariner Books, 2016) (with Karen Joy Fowler)
- Cosmic Powers (Saga Press, April 2017)
- The Best American Science Fiction and Fantasy 2017 (Mariner Books, 2017) (with Charles Yu)
- The Best American Science Fiction and Fantasy 2018 (Mariner Books, 2018) (with N.K. Jemisin)
- A People's Future of the United States (One World, February 2019) (with Victor LaValle)
- Wastelands: The New Apocalypse (Titan Books, June 2019)
- The Best American Science Fiction and Fantasy 2019 (Mariner Books, 2019) (with Carmen Maria Machado)
- The Best American Science Fiction and Fantasy 2020 (Mariner Books, 2020) (with Diana Gabaldon)
- The Dystopia Triptych (Broad Reach Publishing, 2020) (with Hugh Howey & Christie Yant)
- The Best American Science Fiction and Fantasy 2021 (Mariner Books, 2021) (with Veronica Roth)
- The Best American Science Fiction and Fantasy 2022 (Mariner Books, 2022) (with Rebecca Roanhorse)
- Lost Worlds & Mythological Kingdoms (Grim Oak Press, March 2022)
- Out There Screaming: An Anthology of New Black Horror (Random House, October 2023) (with Jordan Peele)
- The Best American Science Fiction and Fantasy 2023 (Mariner Books, 2023) (with R.F. Kuang)
- The Best American Science Fiction and Fantasy 2024 (Mariner Books, 2024) (with Hugh Howey)
- The Best American Science Fiction and Fantasy 2025 (Mariner Books, 2025) (with Nnedi Okorafor)
- Robot Wizard Zombie Crit! Stories: Volume One (Adamant Press, 2025)
- The Time Traveler’s Passport (Amazon Original Stories, November 2025)
- The Best American Science Fiction and Fantasy 2026 (Mariner Books, 2026) (with Olivie Blake)

=== Critical studies and reviews of Adams' work ===
Press Start to play

- Sakers, Don (October 2015). "The Reference Library". Analog Science Fiction and Fact. 135 (10): 105–108.
