= The Atlas Six =

Fantasy novel by Olivie Blake

- Author: Olivie Blake
- Language: English
- Series: The Atlas Trilogy #1
- Genre: Fantasy
- Publisher: Self-published (2020); Tor Books (2021)
- Publication place: United States
- Followed by: The Atlas Paradox

The Atlas Six is a fantasy novel by author Olivie Blake. It is the first of a trilogy and follows six powerful young magic users who have the chance to join the secretive Alexandrian Society. The novel was originally self-published via Kindle in early 2020 before it was acquired by Tor Books after a seven-way auction. It was republished by Tor in 2021, followed by a revised edition in March 2022. The second book of the trilogy, The Atlas Paradox, was released in October 2022, and the third book of the trilogy, The Atlas Complex, was released in January 2024.

The Atlas Six audiobook was released on Audible concurrently with the revised edition in March 2022. It is jointly narrated by the author herself, Andy Ingalls, Caitlin Kelly, Damian Lynch, David Monteith, James Patrick Cronin, Munirih Grace and Siho Ellsmore. Each narrator reads the chapters corresponding to a particular character.

The Atlas Six was noted for being a viral "BookTok sensation", with a larger "cult following" gained after Blake's self-publication.

== Reception ==
The Atlas Six debuted at number three on the New York Times Bestsellers List.

In December 2021, Deadline reported that Amazon Studios has outbid other studios for the small-screen rights to The Atlas Six. Amazon was said to be developing a streaming television series adaptation with Brightstar. Blake will executive produce the series.
