= Chloe Gong =

New Zealand novelist

- Chloe Gong at the 2026 Rose City Comic Con
- Born: 16 December 1998 (age 27); Shanghai, China
- Citizenship: New Zealand
- Education: University of Pennsylvania (BA)
- Occupation: Novelist
- Writing career
- Years active: 2020–present
- Notable work: These Violent Delights
- Notable awards: Sir Julius Vogel Award (2021)
- Website: thechloegong.com

Chloe Gong (born 16 December 1998) is a New Zealand novelist specialising in young adult fiction. Her 2020 debut novel, These Violent Delights, was a New York Times best seller. She was named in Forbes 30 Under 30 in 2024.

== Life and career ==
Gong was born in Shanghai, China, and moved to New Zealand with her family when she was two years old. She has a younger sister and brother. She was raised on the North Shore in Auckland, New Zealand, and attended Rangitoto College. While growing up in New Zealand, Gong was immersed in Chinese culture at home, speaking Shanghainese, cooking Chinese food, and celebrating Chinese holidays.

Gong began writing books at the age of 13 using the Notes app on her iPad. By December 2020, she had written nine books, about one manuscript per year. In 2021, Gong graduated with a double major in English and International Relations at the University of Pennsylvania.

Gong wrote her 2020 debut novel, These Violent Delights, in May 2018 after her freshman year of college. The book features a 1920s Romeo and Juliet-esque storyline set in Shanghai. At the age of 21, Gong became one of the youngest writers to author a young adult hardcover on The New York Times Best Seller list. She won the Best Youth Novel at the 2021 Sir Julius Vogel Awards for These Violent Delights. The sequel, Our Violent Ends, was released in November 2021. In 2021, These Violent Delights was noted to be frequently discussed by the BookTok community on TikTok, which was associated with an increase in sales.

Gong is also writing a spinoff duology that follows Rosalind, a character from the initial series. The first book of the spinoff duology, Foul Lady Fortune, was released in September 2022. It is loosely based on the Shakespeare play As You Like It.

In November 2021, Gong announced her first adult fantasy trilogy, inspired by Shakespeare's Antony and Cleopatra and Hong Kong's Kowloon Walled City. The first book of the trilogy, Immortal Longings, was released in July 2023. The second book, Vilest Things, was released in fall 2024.

In June 2024, it was announced that she was working on a young adult cyberpunk series. Coldwire, the first installment of The StrangeLoom Trilogy, was published in November 2025. It is set in the near future where humanity can live in "upcountry", a virtual reality world.

== Accolades ==
Year	Award	Category	Work	Result	Ref.
2020	Goodreads Choice Awards	Young Adult Fantasy & Science Fiction	These Violent Delights	Nominated	
2021	Sir Julius Vogel Awards	Best Youth Novel	These Violent Delights	Won	
2021	Goodreads Choice Awards	Young Adult Fantasy & Science Fiction	Our Violent Ends	Nominated	
2022	Goodreads Choice Awards	Young Adult Fantasy & Science Fiction	Foul Lady Fortune	Nominated	
2023	Goodreads Choice Awards	Young Adult Fantasy & Science Fiction	Foul Heart Huntsman	Nominated	
2024	Libby Book Awards	Romantasy	Immortal Longings	Finalist	

== Bibliography ==
=== These Violent Delights series ===
- These Violent Delights (2020)
- A RomaJuliette Christmas Special (2020, short story)
- Our Violent Ends (2021)

=== Foul Lady Fortune series ===
- "The Priest and the Shepherd" (2022, short story)
- Foul Lady Fortune (2022)
- Foul Heart Huntsman (2023)
- Last Violent Call (novella collection; contains "A Foul Thing" and "This Foul Murder") (2023)
- "In True Delights" (2023, short story)

=== Flesh and False Gods series ===
- Immortal Longings (2023)
- Vilest Things (2024)
- Eyes of Kings (2026)

=== The StrangeLoom series ===
- Coldwire (2025)
- Deadlock (2026)

=== Standalone ===
- How Does It End? (2027)

=== Short stories ===
- "A Thousand More" (2022; from Eternally Yours; ed. Patrice Caldwell)
- "An Eternal Fire" (2024; from Faeries Never Lie: Tales to Revel In; ed. Zoraida Córdova and Natalie C. Parker)
