= Foul Lady Fortune =

2022 fantasy novel by Chloe Gong

- First edition cover
- Author: Chloe Gong
- Language: English
- Series: Secret Shanghai
- Genre: Young adult; historical fantasy
- Publisher: Margaret K. McElderry
- Publication date: 27 September 2022
- Publication place: New Zealand
- Pages: 528
- ISBN: 978-1665905589
- Preceded by: Our Violent Ends
- Followed by: Foul Heart Huntsman

Foul Lady Fortune is a 2022 young adult historical fantasy novel by New Zealand author Chloe Gong. It was published through Margaret K. McElderry Books on 27 September 2022. The first book of the spin-off series to These Violent Delights and overall third book in the Secret Shanghai series, it takes place several years after the first duology, and follows Juliette Cai's cousin, Rosalind Lang, who becomes an immortal assassin. Against the backdrop of 1930s Shanghai, Rosalind and fellow agent Orion Hong must investigate a series of murders. Like its predecessor, the book is a Shakespeare play retelling, this time adapting As You Like It. It covers the real historical events, the Chinese Civil War and the Japanese invasion.

Foul Lady Fortune debuted at number 3 on The New York Times Bestsellers' in the week ending October 16, 2022 and number one on the Indie Bestsellers' list in the week ending October 2, 2022. It was nominated for Young Adult Fantasy & Science Fiction at the 2022 Goodreads Choice Awards. Its audiobook was narrated by Emily Woo Zeller.

== Background ==
As Gong wrote These Violent Delights, the idea of a spin-off series was already germinating. She found Rosalind's background to be interesting, who "made terrible mistakes" and wanted "her time in the spotlight: to fall in love (and be loved back!), to fight for what she believes in".

== Plot ==
In 1931, 19-year-old Rosalind works as a skilled assassin for the Nationalists as a way to redeem her past. Assigned the code name, 'Fortune', she tracks down immoral Communist White Flowers. She is a valuable agent, having been severely sick but brought to life in an experiment that makes her heal and not sleep or age. As the Japanese Imperial Army invade the nation, a string of chemical murders are also being carried out. Tasked with the mission to infiltrate the Japanese, Rosalind is paired with another spy, Orion Hong, where they go undercover as the newlywed couple Janie Mead and Hong Liwen to work at a local Japanese paper, Seagreen Press.

Other characters come into play, with Rosalind's fraternal twin sister Celia and Orion's older brother Oliver working for the Communists. Celia witnesses the soldiers acting strangely at the warehouse, which turns out to be a location used for chemical experiments. Alisa, younger sister of Roma and spy for the Communists, also works undercover at the Seagreen Press.

Eventually, Rosalind and Orion come across vials at the warehouse. On a night when Rosalind investigates alone, she is attacked by the killer, who turns out to be Orion. She restrains him in her apartment, and when he comes to, has no recollection of the attack or past crimes. It turns out Lady Hong, Orion's mother, was behind transforming her son into a weapon and erasing his memory. The Japanese, assisted by Nationalist defectors, are perfecting a chemical that grants superhuman strength and healing. Oliver confesses to knowing their mother's work but wanted to protect Celia. Rosalind destroys the vials but one remains, which Alisa safeguards and disappears into hiding.

== Characters ==
- Rosalind "Fortune" Lang (Rosalind), an immortal assassin who works for the Nationalists
- Orion Hong (Orlando), a Nationalist spy who has the reputation of being a playboy
- Celia Lang (Celia), Rosalind's fraternal twin sister who works for the Communists
- Oliver Hong (Oliver de Boys), Orion's older brother who has defected to the Communists
- Phoebe "Priest" Hong (Phoebe), Orion's mischievous younger sister who wants to be a spy; secretly a Communist assassin
- Silas "Shepherd" Wu (Silvius), works for the Nationalists as an auxiliary agent; holds unrequited love for his childhood friend Phoebe
- Alisa Montagova, Roma's younger sister who is a Communist spy
- Dao Feng, Rosalind's handler/mentor who turns out to be a double agent
- Jiemin (Jaques), 18-year-old despondent teenager and handler who replaces Dao Feng
- Audrey and Millie, Communist agents
- Yōko, Tarō, and Tong Zilin, workers at the Seagreen Press

== Accolades ==
Award	Category	Result	Ref.
2022 Goodreads Choice Awards	Young Adult Fantasy & Science Fiction	Nominated	

== Critical reception ==
Foul Lady Fortune met with positive reception, earning a starred review from Publishers Weekly.

Publishers Weekly penned, "While the duo's repartee is sizzling on its own, their relationships with secondary characters—including Rosalind's transgender sister Celia and Orion's brother Oliver, both Communist Party members—add tension that further complicates Gong's pulse-pounding caper". Kirkus Reviews called it "thrilling from start to finish", where its political allegiances and suspicions of who to trust add to the intrigue; additionally, the cast of supporting characters are viewed positively. Yunoo Kim of The Cornell Daily Sun favourably wrote, "the two leads are deeply compelling. Rosalind is genuinely flawed and plausibly powerful, and the transformation of her dynamic with Orion is entertaining to read about regardless of who's narrating. The two carry both an immense amount of burdens, and, despite their bickering, admiration for each other". She continued, "Their relationship is far from smooth, but it is a pleasant change of pace from the unhealthy power dynamics and toxic behavior perpetuated by similar YA romances".
