= The Best American Science Fiction and Fantasy =

Science fiction and fantasy anthology

The Best American Science Fiction and Fantasy is an annual anthology of North American science fiction and fantasy stories.

== Background ==
It was first published by Houghton Mifflin through the year 2017. It has been part of The Best American Series since 2015. Since 2019 it has been published by Mariner Books, an imprint of HarperCollins, which took over the Houghton Mifflin publishing house.

Similar to the selection process in the other The Best American Series titles, the series editor chooses about 80 candidates from which a guest editor picks about 20 for publication. For this anthology, forty science fiction and forty fantasy stories are selected. The guest editor selects ten from each genre for inclusion, after reading the works without knowledge of the author or original place of publication. The runners-up, the other sixty stories, are listed in the appendix. To be considered, the works must have been written by an American or Canadian and published for the first time during the previous calendar year in an American or Canadian publication.

In an interview with The Christian Science Monitor in 2016, the series editor John Joseph Adams discussed what topics have been dealt with in science fiction at various periods and what motivates people to read dystopian fiction.

The second volume of the series in 2016 was given a starred review by the book review magazine Kirkus Reviews described the work as a "very elite, highly curated set of stories" and as a "set of primal, classic-seeming tales from our past, present, and future."

In a starred review of the third volume of the series, Publishers Weekly called the collection "superb" and summarized it as a "mostly dystopic, sometimes darkly humorous collection of 20 hard-hitting stories feels timely, confronting contemporary cultural crises…"

== Editors ==
=== Series editors ===
- John Joseph Adams (2015–)

=== Guest editors ===
- 2015: Joe Hill
- 2016: Karen Joy Fowler
- 2017: Charles Yu
- 2018: N. K. Jemisin
- 2019: Carmen Maria Machado
- 2020: Diana Gabaldon
- 2021: Veronica Roth
- 2022: Rebecca Roanhorse
- 2023: R. F. Kuang
- 2024: Hugh Howey
- 2025: Nnedi Okorafor
- 2026: Olivie Blake
