= Ice Planet Barbarians =

Series of sci-fi romance novels by Ruby Dixon

- Ice Planet Barbarians (2015); Barbarian Alien (2015); Barbarian Lover (2015); Barbarian Mine (2015); Ice Planet Holiday (2015); Barbarian's Prize (2016); Barbarian's Mate (2016); Barbarian's Touch (2016); Barbarian's Taming (2016); Barbarian's Heart (2016); Barbarian's Hope (2016); Barbarian's Choice (2016); Barbarian's Redemption (2017); Barbarian's Lady (2017); Barbarian's Rescue (2017); Barbarian's Tease (2017); The Barbarian Before Christmas (2017); Barbarian's Beloved (2018); Barbarian's Valentine (2019); Barbarian's Seduction (2019); Barbarian's Treasure (2020); Barbarian's Bride (2021)
- Author: Ruby Dixon
- Country: United States
- Language: English
- Genre: Fiction, Romance, Science fiction
- Publisher: self-published (2015-2021); Berkley Books (2021-present)
- Published: April 3, 2015–2021
- Media type: Ebook; print
- No. of books: 21

Ice Planet Barbarians is a series of science fantasy romance/erotica novels by author Ruby Dixon. The series began with the novel Ice Planet Barbarians, which Dixon originally self-published in April 2015. The novel was re-published in mass market print by Berkley Books on November 30, 2021. The Ice Planet Barbarians series contains twenty-two books in the same setting, concluding with Barbarian's Bride in 2021. Several of the novels have been or will be re-published by Berkley Books. A print special edition of Barbarian Alien, the second book in the series, was released by Berkley Books on January 25, 2022.

Dixon's novels gained a large following on BookTok and topped multiple Amazon bestseller lists in May 2021. For the week of June 13, Amazon Advisor revealed that Ice Planet Barbarians had reached the fifth most-sold book on Amazon. Barbarian Alien became the eleventh most-sold. In June 2021, CNN reported that bookstores had made special orders to stock the series due to its viral popularity.

== Books ==
The series follows a group of human women who crash-land and become stranded on Not-Hoth, an ice planet, where they meet a tribe of large, blue-skinned creatures called the Sakh. In the first book, Georgie, the de-facto leader of the women, is drawn to Vektal, the leader of the tribe. The Ice Planet Barbarians series was completed in 2021.

The Berkley Books special edition of Ice Planet Barbarians contains an exclusive epilogue and an additional sequel novella.

1. Ice Planet Barbarians (2015)
2. Barbarian Alien (2015)
3. Barbarian Lover (2015)
4. Barbarian Mine (2015)
5. Ice Planet Holiday (2015)
6. Barbarian's Prize (2016)
7. Barbarian's Mate (2016)
8. Barbarian's Touch (2016)
9. Barbarian's Taming (2016)
10. Barbarian's Heart (2016)
11. Barbarian's Hope (2016)
12. Barbarian's Choice (2016)
13. Barbarian's Redemption (2017)
14. Barbarian's Lady (2017)
15. Barbarian's Rescue (2017)
16. Barbarian's Tease (2017)
17. The Barbarian Before Christmas (2017)
18. Barbarian's Beloved (2018)
19. Barbarian's Valentine (2019)
20. Barbarian's Seduction (2019)
21. Barbarian's Treasure (2020)
22. Barbarian's Bride (2021)

In 2017, Dixon began self-publishing the Icehome series, a spin-off of the Ice Planet Barbarians series. It is set on a tropical island on the planet of Not-Hoth and follows more characters from the original series. The first novel in the series is Lauren's Barbarian. The Icehome series was completed in 2022 and is recommended to be read intertwined with the original series.

In 2023, Dixon began self-publishing another spin-off series called Ice Planet Clones, which takes place after the continuity of Ice Planet Barbarians and Icehome. The series began with R’jaal’s Resonance.

== Reception ==
Kirkus Reviews gave Ice Planet Barbarians a starred review, calling it "The perfect blend of sweet, sexy romance and a riveting, high-stakes survival story," with "Explorations of coercion, consent, and free will," and noted that the series has a dedicated fan podcast. Barbarian Lover also received a starred review.

Publishers' Weekly said of the series, "Anyone expecting a few laughs at a potentially silly premise will instead find themselves deeply invested in the characters and eager to come back for more."

A review of Ice Planet Barbarians in Library Journal said that Dixon had "created a fully realized world, blending science fiction, fantasy, and romance that’s on the steamier side," while also noting that "a controversial rape scene" was edited out of the novel before its publication by Berkley Books.
