= The Unselected Journals of Emma M. Lion =

Series of American epistolary novels

- Volumes 1–8
- Author: Beth Brower
- Language: English
- Genre: Epistolary fiction
- Publisher: Rhysdon Press (2019–2026); Viking Penguin (U.S., 2026–present); Bloomsbury (U.K., Australia, New Zealand, 2026–present); HarperCollins (Canada, 2026–present)
- Published: November 2, 2019 – present
- No. of books: 8 (as of 2026)
- Website: sites.prh.com/emma-m-lion

The Unselected Journals of Emma M. Lion is a series of epistolary novels by American author Beth Brower. They are told as the diary entries of an observant, witty young adult orphan living in Victorian London. As of 2026, eight volumes have been published, with the ninth expected in 2027. Brower began self-publishing the series in 2019 and marketing it on social media, and it gained popularity through word of mouth and became a viral phenomenon on social media platforms like BookTok. In 2026, Brower signed deals with major publishers to republish the existing novels and to publish future novels in the series, which she projected to reach 25 books that cover the years 1883 to 1887. The series' protagonist has been compared to literary heroines like Anne Shirley and Elizabeth Bennet.

== Premise ==
Told in first-person perspective through the diaries of Emma Lion, a young adult orphan living in the fictional St. Crispian neighborhood of London, the novels recount her observations as she deals with an unpleasant uncle, fights the loss of her inheritance, grieves the death of her parents, and experiences the social scene in Victorian London. Each book in the series covers a two-month period. When the series reaches its planned 25 books, it will cover the years 1883 to 1887. Brower has said she is writing the books as if they were a TV series, with five or six books representing a "season" in Emma's life.

== Publication history ==
Brower self-published the first two books in the series in November 2019. As a self-publisher, she formatted the books' layouts, decided on cover art, marketed the books and managed her social media pages.

In September 2026, Brower announced that the ninth book in the series would be released in February 2027 and that she had signed a contract with Viking Penguin to publish the series. Penguin was set to bring the first eight books in the series out in trade paperback in November 2026. She had previously announced deals with Bloomsbury to publish the books in the United Kingdom, Australia and New Zealand, and with HarperCollins to publish in Canada. Brower has also sold translation rights in several other countries, including plans to translate the series into Dutch, French, German, Italian, Portuguese and Spanish.

Genevieve Gaunt narrated the series' audiobooks.

== Reception ==
The popularity of the Emma M. Lion books grew by word of mouth. The first volume in the series eventually surpassed 100,000 reviews on book review site Goodreads. The first eight books in the series have sold more than one million physical and e-book copies. In the summer of 2026, the series became one of the first historical fiction series to go viral on BookTok, a TikTok subcommunity for book discussions.

The New York Times described Emma as "shar[ing] the sunny wonder of Anne Shirley, but her wit and modernity are pure Elizabeth Bennet". Likewise, Book Riot called Emma a "delightful character . . . funny, charming, and strong-willed." The Times said the series has "enough literary merit to please self-proclaimed book snobs; it resists explicit scenes driving other BookTok sensations while still giving romance fans fodder for endgame predictions; and it features nuanced spiritual musings yet doesn’t alienate nonreligious readers or veer into saccharine territory."

In The Spectator, audiobook narrator Genevieve Gaunt said that the series was "one of the richest, most poignant and hilarious pieces of literature I have read." National Review described the series as "[f]ull of delightful characters and whimsical plot twists" and "equal parts amusing, romping, heartbreaking, and profound."

Volume 5 of the Unselected Journals, published in 2021, was a finalist for the Whitney Awards.
