= Beth Brower =

American novelist

- Born: 1982 or 1983 (age 43–44)
- Education: Utah Valley University
- Writing career
- Genres: Fantasy, epistolary fiction
- Notable work: The Unselected Journals of Emma M. Lion
- Website: www.bethbrower.com

Beth Brower (born 1982 or 1983) is an American novelist. She is the author of 13 books, including eight volumes in the series The Unselected Journals of Emma M. Lion, which she plans to reach 25 books. Brower began her career through self-publishing, marketing her books through social media. After the Emma M. Lion books became popular via word of mouth and on BookTok, U.S. rights to the series were acquired by large publishing houses.

== Early life and education ==
Brower grew up in Orem, Utah, as the fifth of 11 siblings. She received a degree in literary studies from Utah Valley University. While attending UVU, she began working as a gardener and eventually became head gardener at Rivendell, a 7-acre (2.8 ha) garden in Park City, Utah, inspired by the fictional setting in The Lord of the Rings. She left Rivendell after seven years, attributing the departure to chronic illness.

== Writing career ==
After having novels rejected by publishers, Brower decided to self-publish her work under the name Rhysdon Press. She recruited family to help; her sister edited books and her brother-in-law designed book covers. Brower laid out the pages of the book herself in InDesign. Her first works were primarily fantasy novels. Starting in 2016, she published five books: The Queen’s Gambit, The Ruby Prince, The Wanderer's Mark, The Q and The Beast of Ten.

In November 2019, she released the first two volumes of The Unselected Journals of Emma M. Lion, an epistolary series in which the titular young adult orphan makes her way through Victorian London encountering a quirky set of characters. Brower had only been to London once at the time she began writing the series. Brower has said she has sketched out 25 books in the series.

The popularity of the Emma M. Lion books grew by word of mouth, and the first volume in the series eventually surpassed 100,000 reviews on book review site Goodreads. By 2026, the first eight books in the series had sold more than one million physical and e-book copies. In the summer of 2026, the series became one of the first historical fiction series to go viral on BookTok.

Brower signed deals with Viking Penguin to republish the series' existing books as well as the future books in the U.S., with Bloomsbury to publish the books in the United Kingdom, Australia and New Zealand, and with HarperCollins to publish the books in Canada.

== Personal life ==
Brower lives with her husband in Orem, Utah.
