= Olivie Blake =

American author

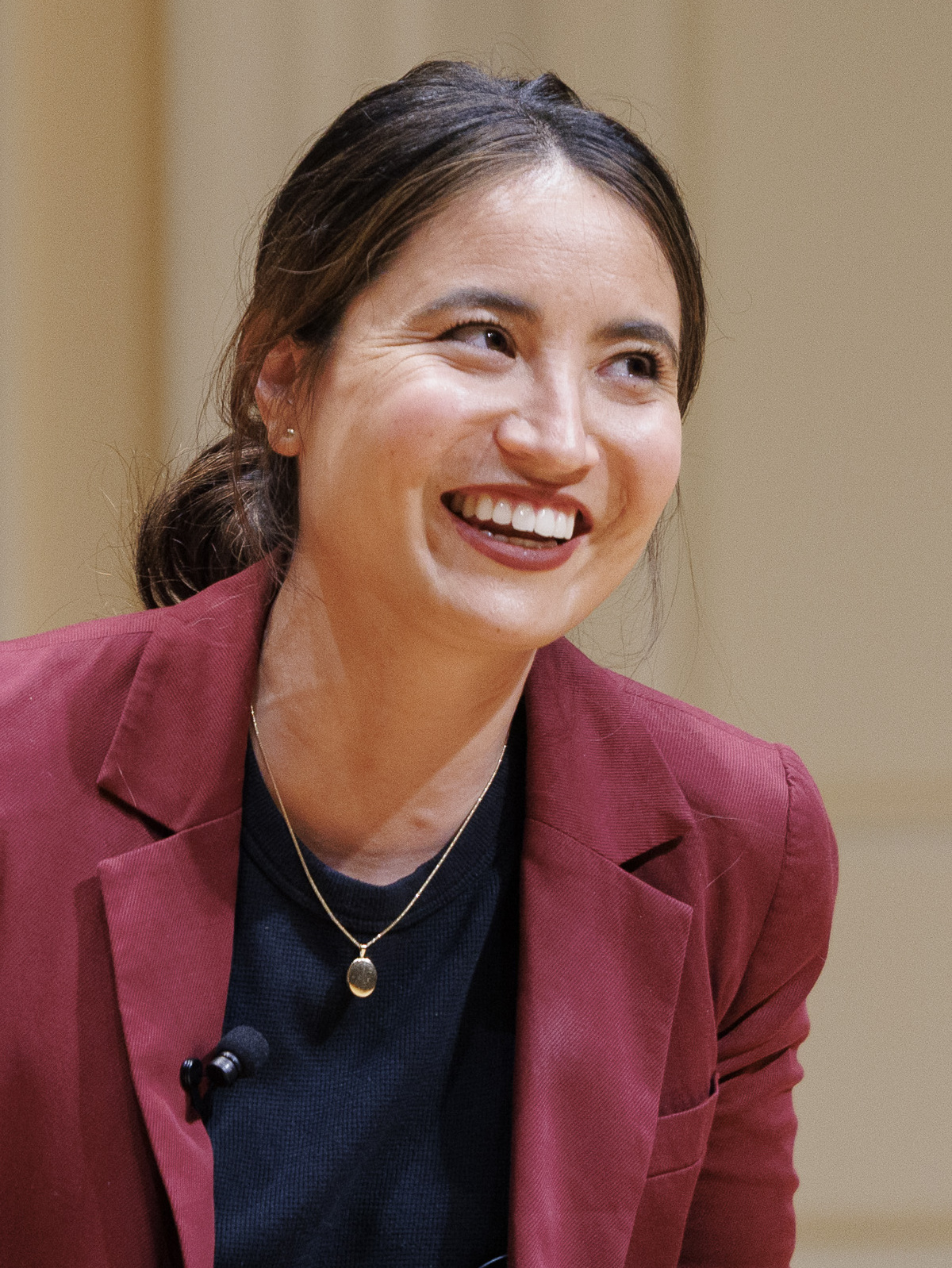
- Blake in 2024
- Born: Alexene Farol Follmuth; January 31, 1989 (age 37); San Francisco Bay Area
- Occupation: Author
- Writing career
- Pen name: Olivie Blake
- Years active: 2016-present
- Genres: Adult Speculative Fiction, Fantasy, Science Fiction, Literary Romance, YA Rom-Com, Paranormal, Thriller, Comics
- Notable work: The Atlas Six
- Website: olivieblake.com

Alexene Farol Follmuth, known by her pen name Olivie Blake, is an American writer who primarily writes adult speculative fiction and SFF, best known for The Atlas Six trilogy, a New York Times and Sunday Times best seller.

== Personal life ==
Prior to being a full time writer, Blake obtained a master's degree in Urban Planning and worked at a public defender's office while attending law school. She later abandoned law school to pursue her career as an author.

Blake was born in the Bay Area, is of half-Filipino descent, and lives in Los Angeles with her husband and son.

== Career ==
Blake put her pen name through a name generator originally to anonymously write fan fiction. She self-published six novels prior to being picked up by a traditional publisher.

Blake uses her pen name for adult literature and her legal name for young adult literature.

Blake's most notable work is her only series, The Atlas Series, a fantasy trilogy that follows six medeians who are invited to the Alexandrian Society, five of whom are promised initiation, at the cost of one's elimination.

The Atlas Six was later republished by Tor Books in 2022 with revisions after going viral on TikTok, Instagram, and Twitter, while Blake was having her first son. In late 2021, Amazon Studios announced they will be collaborating with Brightstar Productions and Blake to produce the novel into a television series.

Tor Books also republished Blake's backlist titles: New York Times bestselling Masters of Death (2018), One for My Enemy (2019) and Alone With You in the Ether (2020).

Blake then published the second novel in The Atlas Six series in 2022, The Atlas Paradox, alongside Sacred Hospitality, an Atlas short story taking place before the events of the novel, both via Tor. In the same year, she published her first YA novel, My Mechanical Romance, with Holiday House, under her legal name, Alexene Farol Follmuth. My Mechanical Romance revolves around women in STEM, and was inspired by the author's husband, who is a high school physics teacher.

== Works ==
=== Series ===
==== The Atlas Series ====
- Sacred Hospitality (The Atlas #0.5). Tor UK. 2022. ASIN B0BLRM7TXP.
- The Atlas Six. Tor Books. 2021. ISBN 9781250854551.
- The Atlas Paradox. Tor Books. 2022. ISBN 9781250855121.
- The Atlas Complex. Tor Books. 2024. ISBN 9781250855138.

=== Stand-alone works ===
- Masters of Death. Tor Books. 2018. ISBN 9781250892461.
- Alone With You in the Ether. Tor Books. 2022. ISBN 9781250888167.
- One for My Enemy. Tor Books. 2023. ISBN 9781250892430.
- Gifted & Talented. Tor Books. 2025. ISBN 9781250883407.
- Girl Dinner. Tor Books. 2025. ISBN 9781250883452.
- Dreamland. Tor Books. 2026 ISBN 978-1-0350-3962-3
- Newphoria! Tor Books ISBN 9781250883490

=== Collections ===
==== Fairytale Collections ====
- Fairytales of the Macabre. Independently published. 2017. ASIN B076YSKYGB.
- Midsummer Night Dreams. Independently published. 2018. ASIN B07DZ1F32G.
- The Lovers Grim. Independently published. 2019. ASIN B07T9JV6R4.

==== Standalone collections ====
- Januaries: Stories of Love, Magic & Betrayal. Tordotcom. 2024. ISBN 9781250330680.

==== Witch Way anthologies ====
- The Answer You Are Looking For Is Yes: A Witch Way Anthology. Witch Way Publishing. 2020. ISBN 9780578662275.
- Grow Your Own Optimist!: A Witch Way Anthology. Witch Way Publishing. 2023. ISBN 9781087995588.

=== As Alexene Farol Follmuth ===
- My Mechanical Romance. Holiday House. 2022. ISBN 9780823450107.
- Twelfth Knight. Tor Teen. 2024. ISBN 9781250884893.

=== As editor ===
- Olivie Blake; John Joseph Adams, eds. (2026). The Best American Science Fiction and Fantasy 2026. Mariner Books. ISBN 9780063441521.

== Awards and achievements ==
Year	Work	Award	Category	Result	Ref
2022	The Atlas Six	Goodreads Choice Awards	Fantasy	Nominated	
2022	The Atlas Six	New York Times Best Seller	Hardcover Fiction	#3	
2022	The Atlas Six	Vulture Best Fantasy Novels	Fantasy	#10	
2022	My Mechanical Romance	Goodreads Choice Awards	Young Adult Fiction	Nominated	
