= Lauren Roberts =

American filmmaker and producer

- Born: Lauren Selmon Roberts
- Education: California State University; Southern Illinois University Carbondale
- Occupations: Director, producer, cinematographer, editor
- Years active: 2009–present
- Spouse: Will Roberts
- Parents: Dewey Selmon (father); Kathryn Selmon (mother)

Lauren Selmon Roberts is an American filmmaker and film producer. She is the director of Rainbow Town, a documentary focused on orphans in war-torn Liberia.

== Career ==
She is the daughter of Kathryn and Dewey Selmon of Norman, Oklahoma. She completed her bachelor's degree in broadcast journalism from California State University, Fresno in May 2005. Afterwards, she graduated with a master of fine arts degree from the College of Mass Communication and Media Arts of Southern Illinois University Carbondale.

When she was 14 years old, Roberts began to use a video camera and she created her first video, an entry for a WNBA commercial, when she was 15 years old. During this period, she started to play multiple roles in school such as reporting, producing, shooting and editing. After her graduation, she worked for local news channels.

In the meantime, she went to West Africa for a documentary. After a two-year stint working with war orphans & former child soldiers in Liberia, she decided to make her first full-length documentary, Rainbow Town in 2010. She was also the cinematographer and editor of the documentary. The film revolves around the true story of a woman who saved the lives of more than 250 war orphans during Liberia's civil war. After receiving critical acclaim, the film was also honored with the award from the Directors Guild of America. It was later screened at New York Fashion Week, at the Museum of Tolerance International Film Festival and other national & international film festivals.

After the success of the film, she joined as a producer at NBCUniversal's in-house production company, 'Peacock Productions'. Since 2011, she has worked as assistant producer, associate producer and executive producer for several television serials, TV specials and documentaries.

== Filmography ==
Year	Film	Role	Genre	Ref.
2010	Rainbow Town	Director, cinematographer, editor	Video documentary	
2011	The 85th Anniversary of the Macy's Thanksgiving Day Parade	Assistant producer	TV special	
2012	Dateline NBC	Assistant producer	TV series documentary	
2012	Adele: Live in London with Matt Lauer	Assistant producer	TV special	
2012	Sandy: The Anatomy of a Superstorm	Associate producer	TV movie documentary	
2012	Breaking Amish	Associate producer	TV series documentary	
2013	Cycling High: Doping to Win	Associate producer	TV movie documentary	
2013	Caught on Camera: Terror in Boston	Associate producer	TV movie documentary	
2015	Whitney Houston Live: Her Greatest Performances	Associate producer	TV special	
2015	Why Planes Crash	Associate producer	TV series documentary	
2015	The Real American Sniper	Associate producer	TV movie documentary	
2015	Hate in America	Associate producer	TV movie documentary	
2016	The Seven New Signs of the Apocalypse	Associate producer	TV movie documentary	
2016	Hate in America	Associate producer	TV mini-series documentary	
2017	Beyond the Headlines	Producer	TV series documentary	
2018	Headliners	Associate producer	TV series documentary	
2020	Behind Closed Doors	Producer	TV series	
