= Kindle Worlds =

Defunct publisher service

Kindle Worlds was a publisher service of the online retailer Amazon, devoted to providing a commercial venue for fan fiction creations of specific licensed media properties. It was established on May 22, 2013, as part of Amazon Publishing. In August 2018, Amazon shut down the Kindle Worlds website.

The purpose of this service was to publish fan fiction stories of certain licensed media properties to be sold in the Kindle Store with terms including 35% of net sales for works of 10,000 words or more and 20% for short fiction ranging from 5000 to 10,000 words.

Stories hosted on the service were required to abide by some restrictions, including a ban on pornographic or offensive content and copyright violations. The stories had to be correctly formatted and were prohibited from using misleading titles.

== Licensed properties ==
- The Arrangement
- The Abnorm Chronicles
- Body Movers
- The Dead Man
- The Foreworld Saga
- G.I. Joe
- Gossip Girl
- The Lizzy Gardner Files
- Veronica Mars
- Pretty Little Liars
- John Rain
- Ravenswood
- Silo
- Valiant Comics
- The Vampire Diaries
- Wayward Pines
- The World of Kurt Vonnegut
- X-O Manowar
