= The Apocalypse Triptych =

Series of three anthologies

- Official logo for the series, showing the three stages of the apocalypse
- The End is Nigh; The End is Now; The End Has Come
- Edited by: John Joseph Adams; Hugh Howey
- Country: United States
- Language: English
- Genre: Apocalyptic and post-apocalyptic fiction
- Publisher: Self-published
- Published: 2014–2015
- Media type: Print, e-book, audiobook

The Apocalypse Triptych is a series of three anthologies of apocalyptic and post-apocalyptic fiction, edited by John Joseph Adams and Hugh Howey. The first anthology, The End is Nigh, was self-published on March 1, 2014, with the second volume, The End is Now following on September 1, 2014. The final anthology, The End Has Come, was released on May 1, 2015.

== Synopsis ==
The Apocalypse Triptych features stories from various different authors such as Sarah Langan, Scott Sigler, Ken Liu, Tobias S. Buckell, and Carrie Vaughn, as well as from Hugh Howey. Each volume contains several stories with an apocalyptic theme, and each volume is set during a specific stage of an apocalypse. The first volume contains stories that deal with the concept of an impending apocalypse, while the second volume looks at what life would be like during such an event. The final volume collects stories that discuss people trying to rebuild and replenish civilization.

== Bibliography ==
- The End is Nigh (2014)
- The End is Now (2014)
- The End Has Come (2015)

== Reception ==
Critical reception for the first volume was positive and Boing Boing has praised Tobias Buckell's "System Reset", one of the stories in The End is Nigh.Black Gate gave The End is Nigh a positive review, commenting that they felt that it was good enough to "probably be up for best anthology on some ballots". Wired and Fearnet also gave the first volume praise, and Wired stated that while some of the stories "hit with more force than others" the anthology as a whole was excellent. The 2022 AMC+ series Pantheon was based on the Ken Liu stories "The Gods Will Not Be Chained", "The Gods Will Not Be Slain", and "The Gods Have Not Died in Vain".
