= These Violent Delights =

2020 fantasy novel by Chloe Gong

- First edition cover
- Author: Chloe Gong
- Language: English
- Series: Secret Shanghai
- Genre: Fiction; romantic fantasy
- Publisher: Margaret K. McElderry
- Publication date: 17 November 2020
- Publication place: New Zealand
- Pages: 449
- ISBN: 978-1534457690
- OCLC: 1137209624
- Followed by: Our Violent Ends

These Violent Delights is a historical and romantic fantasy novel by New Zealand author Chloe Gong. It is her debut novel. The opening installment of the duo-logy of the same name and overall first in the Secret Shanghai series, it reimagines Shakespeare's Romeo and Juliet. Set in 1920s Shanghai, the novel depicts star-crossed lovers Juliette Cai and Roma Montagov, heirs to rival gangs, and their efforts to create a cure for the disease that has plagued their city.

These Violent Delights was published through Simon & Schuster's imprint label, Margaret K. McElderry Books, on 17 November 2020. Met with critical acclaim, it became a New York Times bestseller and won Best Youth Novel at the 2021 Sir Julius Vogel Awards.

== Background ==
I wanted to make a story out of it that looked at the good and the bad and the ugly. Yes, the aesthetic makes a great story. But then there's also everything about colonization and those parallels, and I was like, 'As an [international relations] major, I want to delve into this.'

— Gong, on the backdrop of Shanghai's golden age

At the time, Gong was attending the University of Pennsylvania, where she was double-majoring in English and international relations. She began writing the novel during the summer break of her first year, the central idea being a blood feud. She was 19 when she wrote the first draft, and was published at 21, where The New York Times named her as one of the youngest best-selling authors. The process of getting published was relatively quick, where following the draft's completion, she wrote query letters to several agents and landed with Laura Crockett at Triada US. After four months of revisions, the book went into auction, where it was acquired by Tricia Lin at Simon Pulse.

The choice of the book's setting was inspired by her own background and interest in the Roaring Twenties. Her family was from Shanghai for several generations until her parents immigrated to New Zealand when Gong was two years old. She grew up hearing stories about the city, and would visit annually due to family members remaining there.

Conceived as a standalone, These Violent Delights spanned from September 1926 to April 1927 during the Republican Era; her editor suggested splitting it into two books instead. Gong drew from her personal struggles, where the protagonist Juliette receives a Westernized education in order to communicate with foreigners, paralleling the experiences of second-generation immigrant kids. She added, "I was building a girl who is caught between two worlds—needing to appear all-knowing to justify herself, but deep down, fearing her inadequacy within both of her worlds. This is something diaspora understand inherently, in a way that we can't necessarily explain to non-diaspora who might not get it the same way".

== Plot ==
In 1920s Shanghai, power is wielded by the two rival gangs, the Scarlets and the White Flowers.

Scarlet heiress Juliette meets with a British merchant on her father's behalf. She refuses the offer of selling bulks of the opioid, lernicrom, in the black market. Moments later, her former lover and White Flower heir, Roma, steps onto their territory. He shares news of how five White Flowers, one Scarlet, and a British policeman were found dead last night at the docks. Rather than being a territorial dispute, the wounds were self-inflicted.

The next morning, Roma, his friend Marshall, and cousin Benedikt investigate the docks. They discover dead insects and take it to scientist Lourens Van Dijk, who discovers they're artificially created and share a hive mind. Elsewhere, Juliette finds a clue that the Communists do not take responsibility for the madness, though believe Secretary-General Zhang Gutai was behind it. Paul also invites the Scarlets to a masquerade party in the French Concession. At the event, Paul reveals his father is working for the Larkspur, where lernicrom is a vaccine.

In hopes of the gangs working together, this proves disastrous as they refuse to cooperate. Roma's younger sister, Alisa, becomes infected. Roma and Juliette visit Zhang's address for clues, where they're confronted by Qi Ren, Zhang's personal assistant. Later, the pair head to an address on a flyer, stealing a vaccine vial. Benedikt and Marshall find a body of an infected Nationalist guard and take her to the lab, where Juliette and Roma arrive with the vial. Awaiting the vaccine's lab results, they examine Lourens' inventions. Juliette swipes DOODSKUS, which makes an organism appear dead for three hours. Lourens identifies the primary substance of the vaccine to be lernicrom, meaning the Dexters are Larkspur's suppliers.

Juliette visits Paul for answers, seeing the name Archibald Welch on a certified shipment. She and Roma visit a brothel Archibald frequents. Archibald reveals he makes deliveries from Dexter's warehouse to Larkspur's headquarters. Two vaccines are distributed: one containing the opiate and the other using saline. Additionally, Dexter already knew the vaccine formula before the virus broke out.

At Larkspur's office, a masked man informs them Zhang Gutai is turning into a monster and making the vaccine using given information. Juliette alongside her cousin Kathleen, (Note: Celia Lang was ordered to go under her deceased sister's name, Kathleen, though she eventually reclaims her identity in the series. To avoid confusion with the first book's narration, her name is listed as 'Kathleen'.) Roma, Benedikt, and Marshall gather outside an office building to kill Zhang. Despite Zhang's death, the madness isn't cured. They deduce Ren was the monster all along. Below them, the people's revolt begins. Benedikt and Marshall protect Alisa in the hospital, while Kathleen has the messengers warn all factory owners to flee.

The remaining pair find Paul in Ren's apartment, who explains he was sent by the Larkspur, and seizes the opportunity to vaccinate Juliette. He confesses of wanting to save Shanghai, ridding them of the Communists, and making his father successful. He professes his love for Juliette, offering vaccines to the Scarlets and eliminating the White Flowers. She refuses, and Paul frees the monster.

Juliette warns those who are in the monster's path, while Roma heads to the Huangpu River to kill it. However, Roma runs out of ammo in the standoff. The monster returns to the water and unleashes new insects. Before Juliette can assist the non-immune Roma, Paul tries to drown her. She escapes and, with his gun, shoots him in the head. This follows by killing Ren, then the host insect.

Alisa regains consciousness only to find herself, Benedikt, and Marshall held at gunpoint by Tyler and three Scarlets. Roma and Juliette arrive, though Tyler turns the Scarlets against her with accusations of treachery. Knowing Tyler wants bloodshed as retribution, Juliette bargains killing Marshall and sparing the rest. She secretly hands the jar that will make Marshall appear dead, and "shoots" him.

Juliette later visits the Scarlet's safe house, where Marshall is kept. He wants to let Benedikt know that he's alive, though Juliette has to deal with Tyler first. A messenger hands her the letter Kathleen found, containing correspondence to the French Concession. It simply reads, "in the event of my death, release them all".

== Critical reception ==
These Violent Delights was met with positive critical reception, including starred reviews from Kirkus and School Library Journal. It peaked at number 3 on the New York Times' YA bestseller list and remained there for 18 weeks.

School Library Journal favourably assessed, "Gong's writing has a sharp wit and offers new, thrilling stakes for all her readers," continuing, "With a dazzling setting, a mysterious series of murders, and diverse, unapologetically criminal characters, this novel ranks with the greatest YA retellings". Eric Brown of The Guardian called it an "ambitious debut" that "combines strong characterisation, skilfully interwoven political insight and an atmospheric portrayal of a Shanghai in the throes of change".

Madi Fabber from The Harvard Crimson called it a "standout literary release of 2020" and the successful execution of third-person omniscient perspective, which "manages to replicate the feeling of watching a tragedy unfold live on stage". Contrastingly, Jan Lee of The Straits Times was more ambivalent about the narration, stating, "there are points when vital information and clues are revealed to the reader before they are given to the characters, and momentum is lost when one is waiting for the protagonists to play catch-up". Lee conceded, "What Gong does most successfully is build a cinematic, richly sinful Shanghai that is as filthy as it is glamorous. It teems with gangsters, port workers, hustlers, flapper girls, nationalists, communists and foreigners who gleefully carve up the Middle Kingdom for themselves".

== Sequels ==
These Violent Delights is followed by its concluding sequel, Our Violent Ends (2021), in which Juliette and Roma face a new threat terrorizing their home city. The spin-off series, Foul Lady Fortune, focuses on Juliette's cousin Rosalind Lang. Gong has also written supplementary works, including the short stories "A RomaJuliette Christmas Special" (2020), "The Priest and the Shepherd" (2022), and "In True Delights" (2023). The novella collection, Last Violent Call, has "A Foul Thing" follow the marital life of Juliette and Roma, who uncover an assassination plot.
