= List of The New York Times number-one books of 2020 =

The American daily newspaper The New York Times publishes multiple weekly lists ranking the best-selling books in the United States. The lists are split into three genres—fiction, nonfiction and children's books. Both the fiction and nonfiction lists are further split into multiple lists.

== Fiction ==
The following list ranks the number-one best-selling fiction books, in the combined print and e-books category. For the second consecutive year, the most frequent weekly best seller of the year was Where the Crawdads Sing by Delia Owens with 7 weeks at the top of the list.

Date	Book	Author	Ref.
January 5	Where the Crawdads Sing	Delia Owens	
January 12	Where the Crawdads Sing	Delia Owens	
January 19	Where the Crawdads Sing	Delia Owens	
January 26	Where the Crawdads Sing	Delia Owens	
February 2	Where the Crawdads Sing	Delia Owens	
February 9	American Dirt	Jeanine Cummins	
February 16	American Dirt	Jeanine Cummins	
February 23	Golden in Death	J. D. Robb	
March 1	American Dirt	Jeanine Cummins	
March 8	One Minute Out	Mark Greaney	
March 15	Blindside	James Patterson and James O. Born	
March 22	House of Earth and Blood	Sarah J. Maas	
March 29	The Mirror & the Light	Hilary Mantel	
April 5	The Boy from the Woods	Harlan Coben	
April 12	Little Fires Everywhere	Celeste Ng	
April 19	Little Fires Everywhere	Celeste Ng	
April 25	Little Fires Everywhere	Celeste Ng	
May 3	Masked Prey	John Sandford	
May 10	Walk the Wire	David Baldacci	
May 17	Camino Winds	John Grisham	
May 24	The 20th Victim	James Patterson and Maxine Paetro	
May 31	Camino Winds	John Grisham	
June 7	Camino Winds	John Grisham	
June 14	Hideaway	Nora Roberts	
June 21	The Vanishing Half	Brit Bennett	
June 28	The Summer House	James Patterson and Brendan DuBois	
July 5	28 Summers	Elin Hilderbrand	
July 12	28 Summers	Elin Hilderbrand	
July 19	The Vanishing Half	Brit Bennett	
July 26	The Vanishing Half	Brit Bennett	
August 2	The Order	Daniel Silva	
August 9	Near Dark	Brad Thor	
August 16	Deadlock	Catherine Coulter	
August 23	Where the Crawdads Sing	Delia Owens	
August 30	Where the Crawdads Sing	Delia Owens	
September 6	Royal	Danielle Steel	
September 13	Thick as Thieves	Sandra Brown	
September 20	All the Devils Are Here	Louise Penny	
September 27	Shadows in Death	J. D. Robb	
October 4	The Evening and the Morning	Ken Follett	
October 11	The Book of Two Ways	Jodi Picoult	
October 18	The Return	Nicholas Sparks	
October 25	Troubles in Paradise	Elin Hilderbrand	
November 1	A Time for Mercy	John Grisham	
November 8	A Time for Mercy	John Grisham	
November 15	The Sentinel	Lee Child and Andrew Child	
November 22	Fortune and Glory	Janet Evanovich	
November 29	The Law of Innocence	Michael Connelly	
December 6	Rhythm of War	Brandon Sanderson	
December 13	Ready Player Two	Ernest Cline	
December 20	Ready Player Two	Ernest Cline	
December 27	Ready Player Two	Ernest Cline	

== Nonfiction ==
The following list ranks the number-one best-selling nonfiction books, in the combined print and e-books category.

Issue date	Title	Author(s)	Publisher	Ref.
January 5	Educated	Tara Westover	Random House	
January 12	Educated	Tara Westover	Random House	
January 19	Educated	Tara Westover	Random House	
January 26	Educated	Tara Westover	Random House	
February 2	Just Mercy	Bryan Stevenson	Spiegel & Grau	
February 9	A Very Stable Genius	Philip Rucker and Carol Leonnig	Penguin Press	
February 16	Profiles in Corruption	Peter Schweizer	HarperCollins	
February 23	Open Book	Jessica Simpson with Kevin Carr O'Leary	Dey Street	
March 1	Open Book	Jessica Simpson with Kevin Carr O'Leary	Dey Street	
March 8	The Mamba Mentality	Kobe Bryant	Melcher Media	
March 15	The Splendid and the Vile	Erik Larson	Crown	
March 22	The Splendid and the Vile	Erik Larson	Crown	
March 29	Untamed	Glennon Doyle	The Dial Press	
April 5	The Splendid and the Vile	Erik Larson	Crown	
April 12	The Splendid and the Vile	Erik Larson	Crown	
April 19	The Splendid and the Vile	Erik Larson	Crown	
April 26	Hidden Valley Road	Robert Kolker	Doubleday	
May 3	Untamed	Glennon Doyle	The Dial Press	
May 10	Untamed	Glennon Doyle	The Dial Press	
May 17	Untamed	Glennon Doyle	The Dial Press	
May 24	Untamed	Glennon Doyle	The Dial Press	
May 31	Untamed	Glennon Doyle	The Dial Press	
June 7	Untamed	Glennon Doyle	The Dial Press	
June 14	Untamed	Glennon Doyle	The Dial Press	
June 21	White Fragility	Robin DiAngelo	Beacon Press	
June 28	White Fragility	Robin DiAngelo	Beacon Press	
July 5	How to Be an Antiracist	Ibram X. Kendi	Random House	
July 12	The Room Where It Happened	John Bolton	Simon & Schuster	
July 19	The Room Where It Happened	John Bolton	Simon & Schuster	
July 26	The Room Where It Happened	John Bolton	Simon & Schuster	
August 2	Too Much and Never Enough	Mary L. Trump	Simon & Schuster	
August 9	Too Much and Never Enough	Mary L. Trump	Simon & Schuster	
August 16	Too Much and Never Enough	Mary L. Trump	Simon & Schuster	
August 23	Live Free or Die	Sean Hannity	Threshold Editions	
August 30	Live Free or Die	Sean Hannity	Threshold Editions	
September 6	Untamed	Glennon Doyle	The Dial Press	
September 13	His Truth Is Marching On	Jon Meacham	Random House	
September 20	Melania and Me	Stephanie Winston Wolkoff	Gallery Books	
September 27	Disloyal	Michael Cohen	Skyhorse Publishing	
October 4	Rage	Bob Woodward	Simon & Schuster	
October 11	Rage	Bob Woodward	Simon & Schuster	
October 18	The Meaning of Mariah Carey	Mariah Carey with Michaela Angela Davis	Andy Cohen / Holt	
October 25	Humans	Brandon Stanton	St. Martin's Press	
November 1	Caste	Isabel Wilkerson	Random House	
November 8	Greenlights	Matthew McConaughey	Crown	
November 15	Greenlights	Matthew McConaughey	Crown	
November 22	Clanlands	Sam Heughan and Graham McTavish	Quercus	
November 29	Humans	Brandon Stanton	St. Martin's Press	
December 6	A Promised Land	Barack Obama	Crown	
December 13	A Promised Land	Barack Obama	Crown	
December 20	A Promised Land	Barack Obama	Crown	
December 27	A Promised Land	Barack Obama	Crown	

== See also ==
- Publishers Weekly list of bestselling novels in the United States in the 2020s
