= Mark Owens =

Mark Owens may refer to:

- Mark Owens (North Dakota politician), member of the North Dakota House of Representatives
- Mark Owens (Oregon politician), member of the Oregon House of Representatives
- Mark Owens, American zoologist, co-author with Delia Owens of Cry of the Kalahari and The Eye of the Elephant
