= Human rights in Zambia =

Human rights in Zambia are addressed in Zambia's constitution. However, the Zambia 2012 Human Rights Report of the United States Department of State (one of the United States' Country Reports on Human Rights Practices) noted that in general, the government's human rights record remained poor. The 2021 version of this report noted improvements in many areas.

== Serious abuses ==
The Zambia 2012 Human Rights Report of the US State Department noted the following serious human rights abuses:

- abuses by security forces, including unlawful killings, torture, and beatings;
- life-threatening prison conditions;
- restrictions on freedom of speech, assembly, and association; media freedom, noting levels of intolerance and harassment of journalists had increased in the year 2016 and suspensions of Itezhi-Tezhi radio station and MuviTV .
- arbitrary arrest and prolonged pretrial detention;
- arbitrary interference with privacy;
- government corruption;
- violence and discrimination against women, child abuse, and trafficking in persons;
- discrimination against persons with disabilities and based on sexual orientation;
- restrictions on labor rights, forced labor, and child labor; and
- that the government generally did not take steps to prosecute or punish officials who committed abuses, allowing impunity to remain a problem;
- unlawful arrests and application of wrong charges on wrong cases; e.g. the treason case of Hakainde Hichilema in 2017;
- public access to information: The law does not provide for public access to government information;
- corruption and lack of transparency in government;
- arbitrary or unlawful interference with privacy, family, home, or correspondence.

== Freedom in the World ratings ==
The following are Zambia's ratings since 1972 in the Freedom in the World reports, published annually by Freedom House (1 is best, 7 is worst).

Year	Political Rights	Civil Liberties	Status	President^{1}
1972	5	5	Partly Free	Kenneth Kaunda
1973	5	5	Partly Free	Kenneth Kaunda
1974	5	4	Partly Free	Kenneth Kaunda
1975	5	5	Partly Free	Kenneth Kaunda
1976	5	5	Partly Free	Kenneth Kaunda
1977	5	5	Partly Free	Kenneth Kaunda
1978	5	5	Partly Free	Kenneth Kaunda
1979	5	5	Partly Free	Kenneth Kaunda
1980	5	5	Partly Free	Kenneth Kaunda
1981	5	6	Partly Free	Kenneth Kaunda
1982	5	6	Partly Free	Kenneth Kaunda
1983	5	6	Partly Free	Kenneth Kaunda
1984	5	5	Partly Free	Kenneth Kaunda
1985	5	5	Partly Free	Kenneth Kaunda
1986	5	5	Partly Free	Kenneth Kaunda
1987	5	5	Partly Free	Kenneth Kaunda
1988	6	5	Partly Free	Kenneth Kaunda
1989	6	5	Partly Free	Kenneth Kaunda
1990	6	5	Partly Free	Kenneth Kaunda
1991	2	3	Free	Frederick Chiluba
1992	2	3	Free	Frederick Chiluba
1993	3	4	Partly Free	Frederick Chiluba
1994	3	4	Partly Free	Frederick Chiluba
1995	3	4	Partly Free	Frederick Chiluba
1996	5	4	Partly Free	Frederick Chiluba
1997	5	4	Partly Free	Frederick Chiluba
1998	5	4	Partly Free	Frederick Chiluba
1999	5	4	Partly Free	Frederick Chiluba
2000	5	4	Partly Free	Frederick Chiluba
2001	5	4	Partly Free	Frederick Chiluba
2002	4	4	Partly Free	Levy Mwanawasa
2003	4	4	Partly Free	Levy Mwanawasa
2004	4	4	Partly Free	Levy Mwanawasa
2005	4	4	Partly Free	Levy Mwanawasa
2006	3	4	Partly Free	Levy Mwanawasa
2007	3	4	Partly Free	Levy Mwanawasa
2008	3	3	Partly Free	Rupiah Banda
2009	3	4	Partly Free	Rupiah Banda
2010	3	4	Partly Free	Rupiah Banda
2011	3	4	Partly Free	Michael Sata
2012	3	4	Partly Free	Michael Sata
2013	3	4	Partly Free	Michael Sata
2014	3	4	Partly Free	Guy Scott
2015	3	4	Partly Free	Edgar Lungu
2016	4	4	Partly Free	Edgar Lungu
2017	4	4	Partly Free	Edgar Lungu
2018	4	4	Partly Free	Edgar Lungu
2019	4	4	Partly Free	Edgar Lungu
2020	4	4	Partly Free	Edgar Lungu
2021	4	4	Partly Free	Hakainde Hichilema
2022	4	4	Partly Free	Hakainde Hichilema

== Freedom of the press ==
Freedoms of expression and of the press are constitutionally guaranteed in Zambia, but the government frequently restricts these rights in practice. Although the ruling Patriotic Front has pledged to free state-owned media—consisting of the Zambia National Broadcasting Corporation (ZNBC) and the widely circulated Zambia Daily Mail and Times of Zambia—from government editorial control, these outlets have generally continued to report along pro-government lines. Many journalists reportedly practice self-censorship since most government newspapers do have prepublication review. The ZNBC dominates the broadcast media, though several private stations have the capacity to reach large portions of the population.

The rights group Freedom House, which publishes annual country reports on press freedom status, has ranked Zambia's press as “Not Free” even in 2016.

== See also ==
- Human trafficking in Zambia
- Internet censorship and surveillance in Zambia
- LGBT rights in Zambia
- Bibliography of the history of Zambia

== Notes ==
1. As of January 1.
