= Carolina (Taylor Swift song) =

2022 promotional single by Taylor Swift

Promotional single by Taylor Swift

from the album Where the Crawdads Sing (Original Motion Picture Soundtrack)
- Written: 2020
- Released: June 24, 2022
- Studio: Long Pond (New York)
- Genre: Americana; Appalachian folk
- Length: 4:24
- Label: Republic
- Songwriter: Taylor Swift
- Producers: Taylor Swift; Aaron Dessner

Lyric video
- "Carolina" on YouTube

"Carolina" is a song written and recorded by the American singer-songwriter Taylor Swift for the soundtrack of the 2022 murder mystery film Where the Crawdads Sing. Released through Republic Records on June 24, 2022, the song is titled after the Carolinas region in the United States, and sung from the perspective of the film's protagonist, Kya. "Carolina" was met with strong acclaim from music critics, most of whom felt the song's ambience matched the film's atmosphere, and is reminiscent of Swift's 2020 indie folk albums, Folklore and Evermore. Reviews commended the song for Swift's vocals, songwriting style, and the overall "haunting" mood.

Produced by Swift and Aaron Dessner, "Carolina" is a slow-paced, downtempo, Americana ballad, particularly in an Appalachian folk style, with country and bluegrass inflections. It is driven by acoustic instruments of the early 1950s, such as fiddle, mandolin, and acoustic guitars. "Carolina" charted in Australia, Canada, Hungary, Ireland, the Netherlands, the United Kingdom, the United States and Vietnam. It won a MTV Movie & TV Award, and was nominated for a Critics' Choice Award, a Golden Globe Award, a Grammy Award, and a Satellite Award amongst other accolades.

== Background and release ==
Where the Crawdads Sing is an American mystery thriller drama film starring Daisy Edgar-Jones in the lead role, directed by Olivia Newman and produced by Reese Witherspoon. It is a film adaptation of the 2018 novel of the same name written by the American author Delia Owens. The story is set in the 1950s, revolving around an abandoned girl named Kya, who grew up in a marsh in North Carolina and becomes the prime suspect in the murder of a man who once romantically pursued her.

The first trailer for the film was released on March 22, 2022, and featured "Carolina" being played in the background. The trailer also revealed that the song was written and performed by the American singer-songwriter Taylor Swift. Another snippet of the song was revealed through a longer trailer of the film on May 22, 2022. The release date of the song was teased by the film's official Instagram account, when they made a series of posts on June 22 with captions that had capitalized letters, spelling out "Carolina This Thursday" together. The next day, the song's release date was confirmed as June 24, 2022. A lyric video on YouTube accompanied the release. On June 15, 2024, Swift performed "Carolina" as part of a mashup with her song "No Body, No Crime" (2020) during the Liverpool stop of her Eras Tour (2023–2024).

== Writing ==
"Carolina" was written solely by Swift and produced by her and Aaron Dessner, with whom she collaborated on her 2020 studio albums Folklore and Evermore. She wrote the song well over a year and a half before the release date of June 24, 2022. According to Witherspoon, Swift wrote the song while working on Folklore but did not reveal that she had written "Carolina" until after she finished the song. Swift's eagerness to contribute to the film grew after she was aware that Witherspoon would be producing. Swift stated on Instagram that she enjoyed the original novel by Owens, and as soon as she heard a film adaptation was "in the works", she wanted to be a part of its soundtrack. She said she aimed to create a "haunting and ethereal" song that captured the novel's "mesmerizing" story. "Carolina" plays over the ending credits, and Newman opined that it "reflects the tone of the story's ending".

== Lyrics and composition ==
"Carolina"
A sample of the first chorus in "Carolina", showing its fiddle line and mellow strums of guitar and mandolin. Critics noted Swift's "haunting" vocals in the song.

"Carolina" has been described as an Americana and Appalachian folk song, with country folk and bluegrass elements, on minor chords. It was recorded in one take and only features instruments available before 1953—around the time when Where the Crawdads Sing takes place—acoustic instruments such as mandolin, fiddle, gently strummed acoustic guitar and "sweeping" strings.

The song begins with the sparse strums of the guitar and eventually expands into a "misty atmosphere" incorporating strings and banjo. The lyrics deal with how Kya, the narrator in the song and the lead character of the film, "roams the lonesome marshes, despairs over those who have left her and hints at the many secrets she's keeping". The lyrics are heavy with naturalistic imagery, such as creeks, backroads, mist, clouds, mud, pines, beaches and forests, inspired by the story's setting in coastal North Carolina. Swift's vocals in the song have been characterized as a "breathy" lower register.

== Critical reception ==
"Carolina" received acclaim from music critics. People journalist Jack Irvin described "Carolina" as a downtempo, "haunting ballad" with lyrics about "sneakily moving through various locations without being seen". Variety critic Chris Willman felt the song is stylistically reminiscent of the music in Folklore and Evermore "at their most folky and subdued." Emily Zemler and Kat Bouza reviewed the song for Rolling Stone, noting that the "haunting" song evokes the film's backwoods setting and the "elegiac" tone of Appalachian folk ballads and praising Swift's "otherworldly and siren-like" vocals. Will Lavin of NME described Swift's vocals as "eerie".

In a glowing review for Clash, Robin Murray called the song a timeless "grand achievement" and the greatest example of Swift's ability to "suggest inner movement, the passing of time and emotion in only a few words." He praised the "innate" instrumentation, Swift's "minimalist yet potent" vocals, and the lyrics "somehow distilling Delia Owens' work—in all its breadth and depth—into a song of real brevity and power." Collider's Ryan O'Rourke called "Carolina" a "chilling" tune with a haunting melody and is "almost a loose re-telling of the events of the book." Emily Zemler of Observer said the song "perfectly captures the bittersweet conclusion" of Where the Crawdads Sing, complementing the film's "palpable mood". ABC News journalist Peter Travers wrote Swift captures "the haunting, folklore quality" of the film's story in the song, via her music and lyrics that suggest an "abiding mystery".

British Vogue's Radhika Seth described the song as a "sweeping earworm" with a "mournful, intensely atmospheric" composition tonally reminiscent of Evermore. Sam Sodomsky of Pitchfork said "Carolina" is an understated song, one that stems from the "darker corners" of Folklore and Evermore, abandoning the "language and texture of pop music in favor of old American folk songs". He further complemented the synergy between Swift's musical approaches in the song: the "ghost story-writing" of the lyrics, and the deep and slow vocals. Lindsay Zoladz of The New York Times named "Carolina" one of the "spookiest" tracks in Swift's discography and "the closest [Swift has] come to writing an outright murder ballad" other than "No Body, No Crime" (2020). In a review of the film for Consequence, Liz Shannon Miller wrote "Carolina" is a "perfect match for the content of the film as well as its mood." Pat Padua of The Washington Post said the song, making use of ominous lyrics, "bridges pop music with Americana".

== Accolades ==
At the 65th Annual Grammy Awards (2023), "Carolina" contended for Best Song Written for Visual Media—Swift's fourth nomination in the category, following "Safe & Sound" (2011) from The Hunger Games: Songs from District 12 and Beyond, "I Don't Wanna Live Forever" (2017) from Fifty Shades Darker, and "Beautiful Ghosts" (2019) from Cats, the first of which won. Swift also garnered her career's first-ever Critics' Choice Movie Award nomination with the song. The song was shortlisted for Best Original Song at the 95th Academy Awards.

Awards and nominations for "Carolina"
Organization	Year	Category	Result	Ref.
Hollywood Music in Media Awards	November 16, 2022	Best Original Song in a Feature Film	Nominated	
Golden Globe Awards	January 10, 2023	Best Original Song	Nominated	
Georgia Film Critics Association	January 13, 2023	Best Original Song	Nominated	
Critics' Choice Awards	January 15, 2023	Best Song	Nominated	
Grammy Awards	February 5, 2023	Best Song Written for Visual Media	Nominated	
Society of Composers & Lyricists Awards	February 15, 2023	Outstanding Original Song for a Dramatic or Documentary Visual Media Production	Nominated	
Latino Entertainment Journalists Association Film Awards	February 19, 2023	Best Song Written for a Film	Nominated	
Satellite Awards	March 3, 2023	Best Original Song	Nominated	
Guild of Music Supervisors Awards	March 5, 2023	Best Song Written and/or Recorded for a Film	Nominated	
MTV Movie & TV Awards	May 7, 2023	Best Song	Won	
World Soundtrack Awards	October 21, 2023	Best Original Song	Nominated	

== Credits and personnel ==
Credits are adapted from the liner notes of Where the Crawdads Sing soundtrack.

- Taylor Swift – vocals, songwriter, producer
- Aaron Dessner – producer, engineer, acoustic guitar, banjo, bass guitar, mandolin, piano, synthesizer, orchestration
- Reid Jenkins – fiddle
- Jonathan Low – mixer, engineer
- Randy Merrill – mastering engineer
- John Hanes – Dolby Atmos mixer

== Charts ==
Weekly chart performance
Chart (2022)	Peak position
Australia (ARIA)	62
Canada Hot 100 (Billboard)	49
Global 200 (Billboard)	45
Hungary (Single Top 40)	20
Ireland (IRMA)	42
Netherlands (Single Tip)	30
New Zealand Hot Singles (RMNZ)	5
UK Singles (Official Charts)	63
US Billboard Hot 100	60
Vietnam Hot 100 (Billboard)	51
