= Paul Kasonkomona =

Zambian human rights and public health activist

- Citizenship: Zambia
- Occupation: Public Health Activist
- Known for: HIV/AIDS activism

Paul Kasonkomona is a Zambian human rights and public health activist. He is known for his 2013 arrest and subsequent acquittal in a court case that centred on freedom of expression and LGBT rights in Zambia. He was arrested after appearing on a live television program where he advocated for the decriminalization of same-sex conduct as a public health measure to combat HIV/AIDS.

== 2013 arrest and legal case ==
=== Television Appearance and Arrest ===
On 7 April 2013, Kasonkomona appeared on "The Assignment," a live program on Zambia's privately owned Muvi TV.

=== Trial and Acquittal ===
Kasonkomona was charged with "soliciting in a public place for immoral purposes" under Section 178(b) of the Zambian Penal Code. His legal team, supported by the Southern Africa Litigation Centre (SALC), argued that his arrest was an unconstitutional violation of his right to freedom of expression.

In February 2014, the Lusaka Magistrate's Court acquitted Kasonkomona, ruling that the state had failed to provide sufficient evidence to prove that he had solicited anyone for immoral purposes. The court found that his television appearance constituted expressing an opinion, not committing a crime.

=== State Appeal and High Court Ruling ===
The Zambian government appealed the acquittal. In December 2015, the High Court of Zambia upheld the lower court's decision, confirming Kasonkomona's acquittal.

== See also ==
- LGBT rights in Zambia
- HIV/AIDS in Zambia
