= Where the Crawdads Sing (film) =

2022 film by Olivia Newman

- Theatrical release poster
- Directed by: Olivia Newman
- Screenplay by: Lucy Alibar
- Based on: Where the Crawdads Sing by Delia Owens
- Produced by: Reese Witherspoon; Lauren Neustadter
- Starring: Daisy Edgar-Jones; Taylor John Smith; Harris Dickinson; Michael Hyatt; Sterling Macer, Jr.; Jojo Regina; Garret Dillahunt; Ahna O'Reilly; David Strathairn
- Cinematography: Polly Morgan
- Edited by: Alan Edward Bell
- Music by: Mychael Danna
- Production companies: Columbia Pictures; Hello Sunshine; 3000 Pictures; HarperCollins Publishers
- Distributed by: Sony Pictures Releasing
- Release dates: July 11, 2022 (MoMA); July 15, 2022 (United States)
- Running time: 125 minutes
- Country: United States
- Language: English
- Budget: $24 million
- Box office: $144.3 million

Where the Crawdads Sing is a 2022 American mystery drama film based on the 2018 novel by Delia Owens. The film follows Kya, an abandoned yet defiant girl, who raises herself to adulthood in a North Carolina marshland, becoming a naturalist in the process. When the town's hotshot is found dead, she is the prime suspect and is tried for murder. Directed by Olivia Newman and written by Lucy Alibar, the film stars Daisy Edgar-Jones, Taylor John Smith, Harris Dickinson, Michael Hyatt, Sterling Macer Jr., Jojo Regina, Garret Dillahunt, Ahna O'Reilly, and David Strathairn.

Mychael Danna composed the film's soundtrack, which includes the original song "Carolina" by Taylor Swift. The song won an MTV Movie & TV Award and was nominated for various other accolades, including a Critics' Choice Award, a Golden Globe, a Grammy, and a Satellite Award.

Where the Crawdads Sing was released in the United States on July 15, 2022, by Sony Pictures Releasing. The film received mixed reviews from critics, who praised Edgar-Jones's performance but found the film's overall tone incoherent. The film was a box office success, grossing $144.3 million against a $24 million budget.

== Plot ==
In 1967, "the manager of Western Auto", Chase Andrews is found dead in the mud, at the bottom of a 63 ft tall metal fire tower from which he had fallen. The muddy bog floods at high tide, destroying any tracks from the killer and no fingerprints are found in the tower. A rare shell necklace, which he had been wearing on the evening of his death, is missing from his body. Local pariah and marsh ecology author "Kya" Clark, is charged with first-degree murder and condemned by the provincial townspeople. Retired, local attorney Tom Milton visits Kya and hears her story in preparation to represent her.

Kya's childhood begins in a North Carolina swamp shack with her four siblings in 1953. As their abusive alcoholic father gambles their money away, Kya's mother and older siblings flee one by one, leaving Kya alone with him until he too abandons her at the age of seven. She survives by selling mussels at Barkley Cove's general store, owned by Mabel and "Jumpin" Madison, who become Kya's de facto guardians. The townspeople revile her as the "marsh girl" and she is ostracized by the other children in the town.

Over the years, Kya's slightly older friend Tate Walker lends her books and teaches her to read and write, while Mabel teaches her to count. Tate shares an interest in marsh ecology, especially avian feathers, and begin a romantic relationship until Tate leaves for college and fails to return as promised on the 4th of July.

Five years later (in 1968), Kya begins a relationship with Chase Andrews, "the best quarterback Barkley Cove ever seen" according to deputy Purdue; he promises her marriage. Chase gives Kya a small, non-indigenous shell which she makes into a necklace and then gives back to him, after he curtly takes her virginity. Not wanting to lose the house to a developer, Kya has her marsh shells drawings and paintings published, to raise the $800 needed to pay the back-taxes on the family home.

In 1969, Tate returns to Barkley Cove wanting to rekindle their romance, but Kya is ambiguous. She ends her relationship with Chase when she discovers he is already engaged to another town girl.

Kya's older brother Jodie returns as a United States Army soldier. Their mother has died of leukemia, while living with her sister; and he has no knowledge of their three older siblings. Jodie asks to visit when he can.

Kya rebuffs Chase's persistent attentions and successfully fights off his rape attempt, vowing to kill him if he returns. The threat is overheard by a local fisherman. Chase returns and vandalizes Kya's home while she hides in the marsh. The constant threat of violence reminds her of her past with her father and leads to anxiety.

Back in the present, Kya's trial has begun. Despite knowing Kya had been meeting with a book publisher in Greenville at the time, the police and the prosecutor speculate she could have disguised herself and made an overnight round-trip bus ride to Barkley Cove, lured Chase to the fire tower and killed him. With only the speculative theory, the missing necklace, red wool cap fibers, and the fisherman's testimony, Kya is found not guilty.

Reconciled, Kya and Tate reunite, agree to a common law marriage "like the geese". Over the years, Kya publishes three more illustrated marsh ecology books, on swamp insects, sea birds and mushrooms. They are frequently visited by Jodie and his family. She offers condolences to Mabel at Jumpin's funeral. While boating through the swamp in her 70s, she imagines herself as a child seeing her mother returning to the cabin. Tate finds Kya lying dead in the boat at their dock.

Boxing up Kya's things, Tate finds a passage in her journal saying that to protect the prey, sometimes the predator has to be killed. It is accompanied by a drawing of Chase. In a hidden compartment in the book, Tate finds the missing shell necklace, which he throws into the marsh waters.

== Cast ==
- Daisy Edgar-Jones as Catherine "Kya" Clark, a woman and writer who grows up in the marsh
  - Jojo Regina as young Kya
  - Leslie France as mid-70s Kya
- Taylor John Smith as Tate Walker, a friend of Kya who becomes her love interest
  - Luke David Blumm as young Tate
  - Sam Anderson as mid-70s Tate
- Harris Dickinson as Chase Andrews, a star football player in Barkley Cove who hits on Kya
  - Blue Clarke as young Chase
- Michael Hyatt as Mabel Madison, the co-owner of a general store in Barkley Cove that befriends Kya
- Sterling Macer Jr. as James "Jumpin'" Madison, the co-owner of a general store in Barkley Cove and husband of Mabel that befriends Kya
- Garret Dillahunt as "Pa" Jackson Clark, the father of Kya
- Ahna O'Reilly as "Ma" Julienne Clark, the mother of Kya
- David Strathairn as Tom Milton, a retired attorney in Barkley Cove who represents Kya at her trial
- Eric Ladin as Eric Chastain, a prosecutor in Barkley Cove
- Logan Macrae as Jeremy "Jodie" Clark, the brother of Kya and old friend of Tate who joined the US Military
  - Will Bundon as young Jodie
- Bill Kelly as Sheriff Jackson, the Sheriff of Barkley Cove
- Jayson Warner Smith as Deputy Joe Purdue, a deputy working under Sheriff Jackson
- Dane Rhodes as Judge Sims, a judge who oversees Kya's trial

== Production ==
=== Development and casting ===
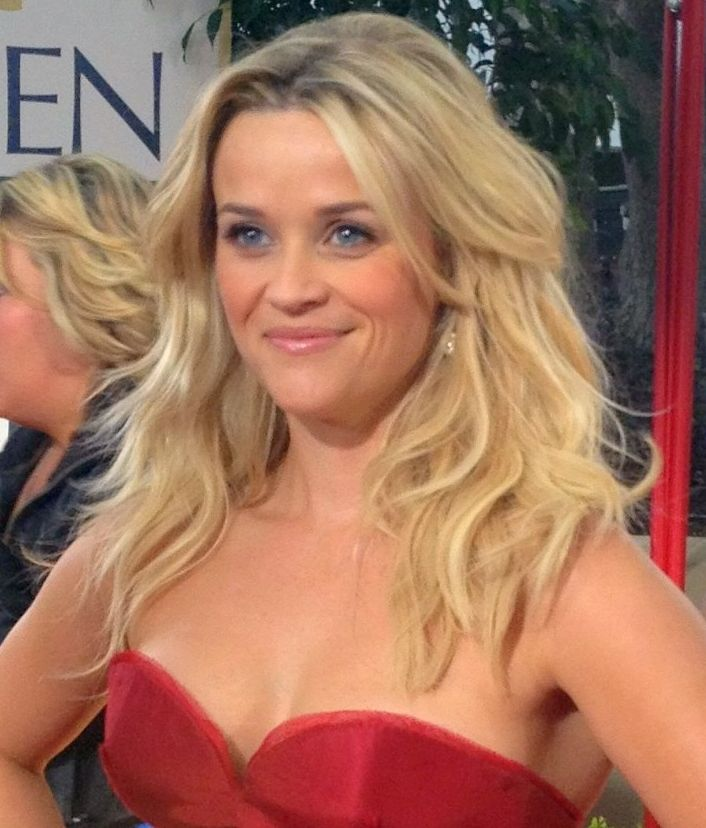
Reese Witherspoon is one of the producers of Where the Crawdads Sing

Media outlets reported in March 2020 that Lucy Alibar had been hired to adapt the film adaptation of Delia Owens' best-selling novel Where the Crawdads Sing for Hello Sunshine and the newly formed 3000 Pictures label of Sony Pictures. In July, Olivia Newman was hired to direct. In January 2021, it was announced that Taylor John Smith and Harris Dickinson would join Daisy Edgar-Jones in the cast. That March, David Strathairn and Jayson Warner Smith joined the cast. In April, Garret Dillahunt, Michael Hyatt, Ahna O'Reilly, Sterling Macer Jr., and Jojo Regina were also added, and in June 2021, Eric Ladin was cast.

=== Filming ===
Principal photography took place from March 30 to June 28, 2021, in New Orleans and Houma, Louisiana.

=== Context and title ===
Owens, a zoologist, grew up in Thomasville, Georgia, and mostly lived in or near wilderness. She received a Bachelor of Science in zoology in the University of Georgia and a PhD in animal behavior from the University of California, Davis. She has stated that she knew she had always wanted to be a writer; however, she decided on a career in science. After spending most of her life as an academic exploring African wildlife behavioral ecology, Owens released her debut novel, Where the Crawdads Sing, in 2018; it topped The New York Times Fiction Best Sellers of 2019 and The New York Times Fiction Best Sellers of 2020 for 32 weeks. According to critics, the book drew considerable inspiration from Owens' life.

The title of the book (from which the film takes its title) is a reference to a phrase told by Kya's mother. Crawdads (crayfish) cannot "sing", but when Kya's mother often encouraged her to explore the marsh, she would say, "Go as far as you can–way out yonder where the crawdads sing." Delia Owens was inspired to use the phrase because her own mother had used it when she was little.

== Music ==
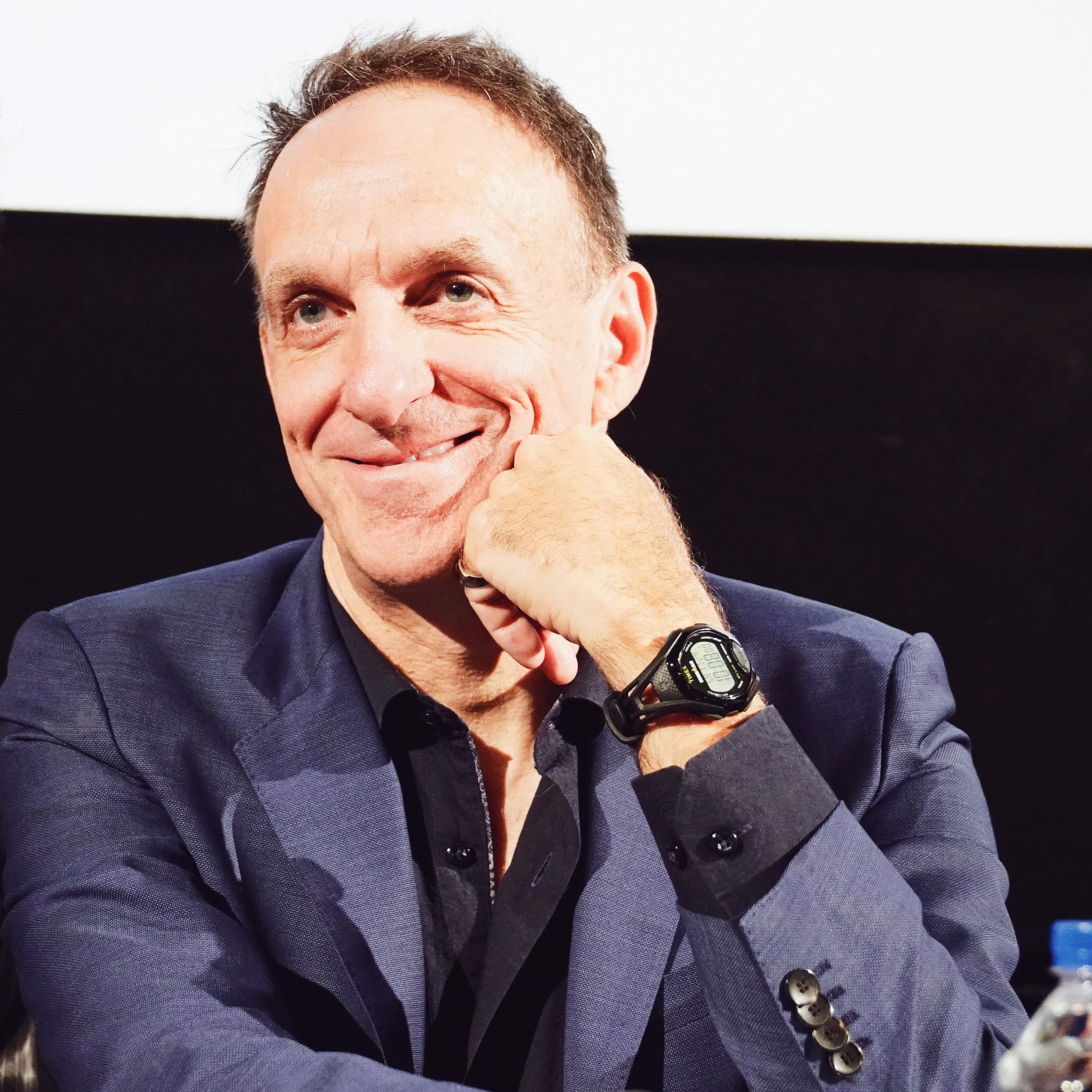
Mychael Danna composed the film score.

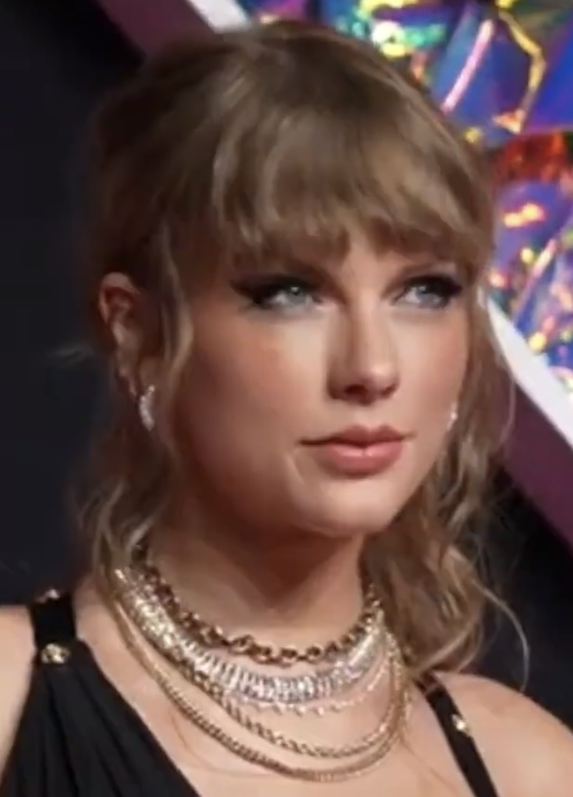
Taylor Swift wrote the original song "Carolina".

Where the Crawdads Sing (Original Motion Picture Soundtrack) was scored by Canadian composer Mychael Danna. The soundtrack contains 22 tracks. All of the tracks were composed by Danna except the original song "Carolina" (2022). American singer-songwriter Taylor Swift wrote and performed "Carolina" for the film, before the film even proceeded into production. Swift stated that she "got absolutely lost in [the book] when [she] read it years ago" and "wanted to create something haunting and ethereal" for the film when she heard it was being produced. Every other track of the soundtrack was created in post-production.

== Release ==
The film had its world premiere at the Museum of Modern Art in New York City on July 11, 2022, and was released in the United States and Canada on July 15, 2022. It was previously scheduled for June 24, 2022, before being delayed to July 22, 2022, and was then moved up a week to July 15. It was released in the United Kingdom on July 22, 2022.

The film was released digitally on September 6, 2022, and on Blu-ray and DVD the following week on September 13, 2022.

== Reception ==
=== Box office ===
Where the Crawdads Sing grossed $90.2 million in the United States and Canada, and $54.1 million in other territories, for a worldwide total of $144.3 million. Deadline Hollywood calculated the net profit of the film to be $74.7 million, when factoring together all expenses and revenues.

In the United States and Canada, Where the Crawdads Sing was released alongside Paws of Fury: The Legend of Hank and Mrs. Harris Goes to Paris, and was initially projected to gross around $10 million from 3,626 theaters in its opening weekend. After making $7.3 million on its first day (including $2.3 million from Thursday night previews), estimates were raised to $16 million. It went on to debut to $17.3 million, finishing third at the box office, behind holdovers Thor: Love and Thunder and Minions: The Rise of Gru. Forbes stated the film is "a big win for Sony and for the notion of non-franchise, adult-skewing, female-targeted studio programmers having a future in theatrical release." Where the Crawdads Sing made $10.4 million in its second weekend, finishing fourth, with Deadline Hollywood noting the 40% drop as a "great hold" for a "female skewing movie during the pandemic." By August 18, 2022, the film had grossed four times its budget of $24 million; Forbes said this is "yet another example of how what Hollywood thinks will make money isn't always the same as what does make money" and that Where the Crawdads Sing filled the vacuum of successful female-centric films in theatres post-pandemic.

On the film's unexpected success, Witherspoon said "This movie wasn't on a lot of people's radars—and it's counterprogramming, I know—but it's a return to real filmmaking. It's a heart-and-soul experience on film with beautiful sets and beautiful costumes and wonderful actors. It's almost nostalgic for what you wanted to see in the summer."

=== Critical response ===
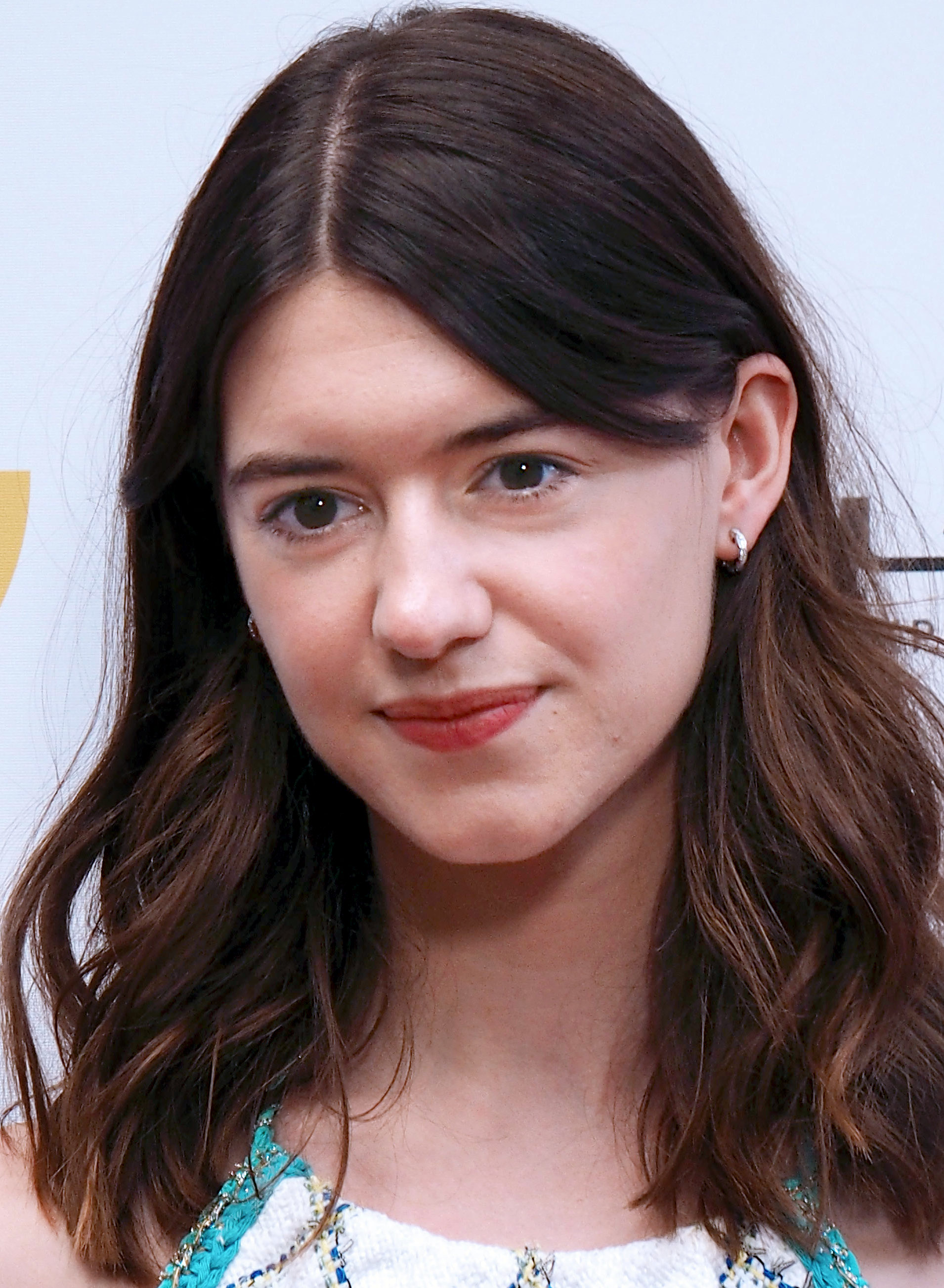
Edgar-Jones was widely praised for her performance.

On the review aggregator website Rotten Tomatoes, 35% of 220 critics' reviews are positive, with an average rating of 5.2/10. The website's critics consensus reads, "Daisy Edgar-Jones gives it her all, but Where the Crawdads Sing is ultimately unable to distill its source material into a tonally coherent drama." Metacritic, which uses a weighted average, assigned the film a score of 43 out of 100, based on 46 critics, indicating "mixed or average reviews". Various critics highlighted Edgar-Jones's performance as the best aspect of the film.

Consequence critic Liz Shannon Miller rated the film A−, describing it as a heartfelt, "lush, lyrical and engrossing Southern Gothic drama". Miller also stated "it's hard to imagine literally anyone else capturing Kya's innocence and intelligence as ably as [Edgar-Jones] does." Leonard Maltin praised Newman's direction, the cinematography, production design, and music, and said Edgar-Jones "effortlessly commands the big screen" by "inhabiting the character of Kya Clark". Richard Roeper of the Chicago Sun-Times called Where the Crawdads Sing "one of the most gorgeously photographed films of the year" and praised the performances of Edgar-Jones and Strathairn. Owen Gleiberman, chief film critic in Variety, dubbed the film "a mystery, a romance, a back-to-nature reverie full of gnarled trees and hanging moss, and a parable of women's power and independence in a world crushed under by masculine will"; he highlighted Edgar-Jones "doleful, earnest-eyed sensuality". CNN journalist Brian Lowry praised Edgar-Jones's "old-fashioned movie-star appeal" and summarized the film as "a smallish movie that hits just enough of the right notes." James Berardinelli rated the film three out of four stars, and complimented the "old-fashioned" approach in storytelling, anchored by Edgar-Jones's "stellar performance".

Leigh Monson of The A.V. Club gave the film a B rating, and said the film "binds a lonely young woman's love story to a legal potboiler", but commended the cast's performance, especially Edgar-Jones's "magnetic leading presence". Scott Mendelson of Forbes wrote Where the Crawdads Sing is "well-acted, handsomely staged and features interesting actors playing somewhat interesting characters in a single film sans any cinematic universe aspirations." /Film's Haoi-Tran Bui rated the film a six out of ten and wrote, "thanks to a guileless and steely central performance by Edgar-Jones, Where the Crawdads Sing manages to find some harmony between its melodramatic swings and its slow-building mystery." Harry Guerin, multimedia journalist for RTÉ, gave the film three out of five stars, and said it is "always watchable" but "loses some goodwill by shoe-horning too much into the third act and moving too quickly towards the credits." Pat Padua of The Washington Post described the film as "Southern-fried The Blue Lagoon meets Murder, She Wrote—and topped off with a sprinkling of To Kill a Mockingbird," in which Edgar-Jones "convincingly" portrays the protagonist's "haunted shyness." He rated the film 2.5 stars out of four.

Assigning the film a C+ rating, David Ehrlich of IndieWire felt the film "is a lot more fun as a hothouse page-turner than it is as a soulful tale of feminine self-sufficiency" but added that Edgar-Jones's strong performance was its saving grace. Thelma Adams of AARP scored it a three out of five stars; Adams said the film is "a cross between The Notebook, Fried Green Tomatoes and To Kill a Mockingbird" that will satisfy fans of the book, but nevertheless "suffers from abuse overload." Bilge Ebiri of Vulture said the film is "an atmospheric and gleefully overheated melodrama" that is faithful to the novel, but "doesn't seem particularly interested in standing on its own, in being a movie"; however, Ebiri praised the character of Kya and Edgar-Jones's talent at portraying Kya's "wounded inner life". Calling the film "downright cringey", Laura Miller of Slate argued that it deviates from the book by glamorizing Kya; "for someone who hides like a timorous fawn whenever visitors come around, the movie's Kya is as well turned out as a heroine in a country music video." Peter Bradshaw, in his one-star review in The Guardian, described Where the Crawdads Sing as an "uncompromisingly terrible southern gothic schmaltzer [...] a relentless surge of solemnly ridiculous nonsense in the style of romdram maestro Nicholas Sparks" and termed Kya as a "Manic Pixie Dream Girl Murder Suspect".

=== Audience response ===
Audiences polled by CinemaScore gave the film an average grade of "A−" on an A+ to F scale. PostTrak reported 87% of audience members gave it a positive score (with an average rating of 4.5 out of 5 stars), with 70% saying they would definitely recommend it.

Of the opening weekend audience, 32% came with someone who wanted to see the film, while 30% saw the film because they were fans of the book. Anthony D'Alessandro of Deadline Hollywood said the film is an example of a harshly reviewed film beating projections, "the pic's opening, 70% ahead of where tracking thought it would be. That's a wonderful thing for the business when Rotten Tomatoes doesn't ruin a movie's ticket sales." Ronald Meyer of Collider stated that Where the Crawdads Sing "may not be one of summer 2022's highest grossing—or critically acclaimed—films, but it is among the season's most profitable."

=== Accolades ===
The film was nominated for a Hollywood Music in Media Award for Original Score – Feature Film and a People's Choice Award for Drama Movie of 2022. Its original song "Carolina" also contended for best original song, winning a MTV Movie & TV Award, and receiving Golden Globe Award, Grammy Award, and Satellite Award nominations amongst others.

Award	Date of ceremony	Category	Recipient(s)	Result	Ref.
Hollywood Music in Media Awards	November 16, 2022	Original Score – Feature Film	Mychael Danna	Nominated	
Hollywood Music in Media Awards	November 16, 2022	Original Song – Feature Film	"Carolina" – Taylor Swift	Nominated	
People's Choice Awards	December 6, 2022	The Drama Movie of 2022	Where the Crawdads Sing	Nominated	
Golden Globe Awards	January 10, 2023	Best Original Song	"Carolina" – Taylor Swift	Nominated	
Georgia Film Critics Association	January 13, 2023	Best Original Song	"Carolina" – Taylor Swift	Nominated	
Critics' Choice Awards	January 15, 2023	Best Song	"Carolina" – Taylor Swift	Nominated	
Grammy Awards	February 5, 2023	Best Song Written for Visual Media	"Carolina" – Taylor Swift	Nominated	
London Film Critics Circle Awards	February 5, 2023	British/Irish Actor of the Year	Harris Dickinson (also for See How They Run and Triangle of Sadness)	Nominated	
Society of Composers & Lyricists Awards	February 15, 2023	Outstanding Original Song for a Dramatic or Documentary Visual Media Production	"Carolina" – Taylor Swift	Nominated	
Satellite Awards	March 3, 2023	Best Original Song	"Carolina" – Taylor Swift	Nominated	
Guild of Music Supervisors Awards	March 5, 2023	Best Song Written and/or Recorded for a Film	"Carolina" – Taylor Swift	Nominated	
Academy Awards	March 12, 2023	Best Original Song	"Carolina" – Taylor Swift	Shortlisted	
MTV Movie & TV Awards	May 7, 2023	Best Song	"Carolina" – Taylor Swift	Won	
World Soundtrack Awards	October 21, 2023	Best Original Song	"Carolina" – Taylor Swift	Nominated	
