= DJ Roxy =

Zambian radio personality

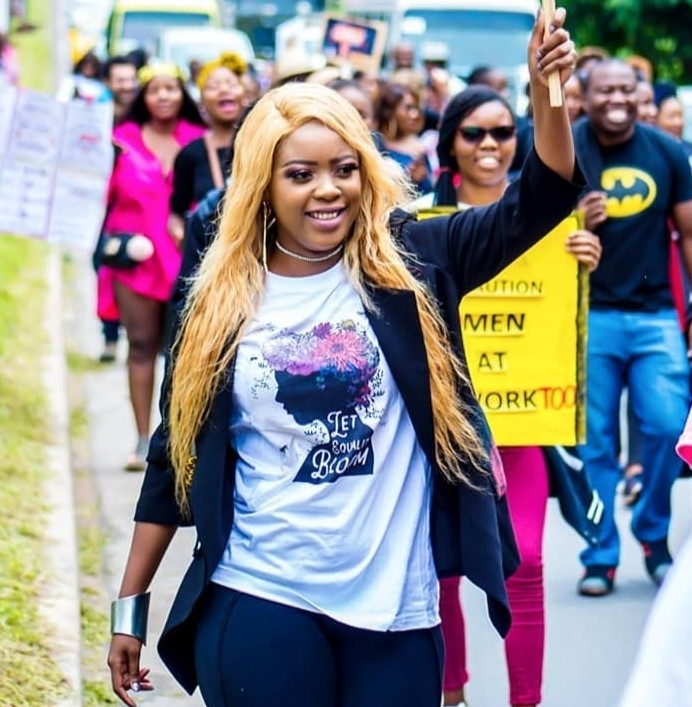
- Roxy during the Women's march
- Born: Chanda Kangwa; June 3, 1989 (age 36); Luanshya
- Occupations: Founder; Media Proprietor; Master of Ceremony; Radio Dj; Media personality; Voice over artist
- Children: Eli C. Kangwa
- Awards: Best Female Radio DJ

Chanda Kangwa (born June 3, 1989) better known by her stage name as DJ Roxy is CEO of 8O8 Communications and Founder of the Zambian Man of the Year Awards she is also a Zambian radio disk jockey producer and media consultant. She is most well known for her career on Radio Phoenix. She is a 1 time winner of the Best Female Radio DJ award at the Mosi Zambian Music Award in 2015 and a nominee at the radio awards in 2016. Kangwa previously worked for Muvi TV as an assistant producer in 2009.

== Life and career ==
Kangwa was born in Luanshya the daughter of Michael Kangwa also known as the “Space Kid” who won the 1989 Zambia's Best Club DJ of the year. In her early teens Kangwa just wanted to be journalist or a singer.
