= The Eye of the Elephant =

1992 book by Delia Owens and Mark Owens

- Author: Delia Owens, Mark Owens
- Language: English
- Genre: Non-fiction
- Publisher: Houghton Mifflin
- Publication date: 1992
- Publication place: United States
- Media type: Print (Hardcover and Paperback)

The Eye of the Elephant: An Epic Adventure in the African Wilderness is a non-fiction book written by Delia Owens and Mark Owens, first published in 1992. It is a sequel to the Owens' 1984 book Cry of the Kalahari, beginning with their move from Botswana to Zambia.

== Plot summary ==
The Eye of the Elephant follows Delia and Mark Owens as they embark on a mission to protect wildlife and preserve natural habitats in the Luangwa Valley of Zambia. The couple establishes a wildlife reserve and works to combat the poaching of endangered species, particularly elephants.

== Reception ==
The New York Times called the book "not merely brazenly but maladroitly ideological" in its promotion of the Owens Foundation for Wildlife Conservation and its paternalistic attitude toward anti-poaching efforts. Kirkus Reviews concludes that the book's narrative presents "[a]nother seemingly clear-cut victory for the tireless defenders of wildlife, who tell a lively tale tinged with that smugness typical of Western conservationists who expect the impossible of poor Africa." The anti-poaching non-profit Poaching Facts described the book as "suspenseful and designed to impress upon the reader the struggles ... that portions of Africa continue to deal with in the face of poverty, apathy to change, systemic corruption at all levels, and coexisting with wildlife in a place that has been forsaken by globalism."
