= Costa Mwansa =

Zambian journalist

- Born: July 31, 1983 (age 43); Lusaka, Zambia
- Occupation: Journalism
- Years active: 2007- Present
- Known for: Journalism
- Television: Diamond TV

Costa Mwansa (born 31 July 1983) is a Zambian journalist and owner of Diamond Television. He won the Charles Mando Award for Best Interview show in the 2015 MISA Zambia awards.

== Biography and career ==
Costa was born in Kalulushi in the early 1980s and began his career at Muvi TV as a presenter in 2007. He went on present the assignment program interviewing politicians including Michael Sata and Hakainde Hichilema, Rupiah Banda, Edgar Lungu, and Kenneth Kaunda and made his name through the program. He has also interviewed former Libyan leader Gaddafi.

Between 2006 and 2010, he was managing editor of Muvi TV, a local Lusaka based television station. He became the station's managing director between 2013 and 2016 before leaving to open his own TV station, Diamond TV.

== Education ==
Mwansa began his primary school at Kalulushi Trust school and later attended Mukuba Boys Secondary School. He then attended Evelyn Hone College to study Journalism and Public Relations. In 2009, he graduated from the DW Akademie in Germany with an Advanced Media and Management qualification. He is currently pursuing a master's degree in Corporate and Commercial Law from ZCAS University. He has a Bachelor of Laws Degree LLB from Zambia Open University.

== Personal life ==
Costa is a farmer who lives in Lusaka. He is a member of the Lusaka Avocado Corporative and has a chicken and fish farming business in Lusaka as well.
