= HIV/AIDS in Zambia =

HIV/AIDS is considered the deadliest epidemic in the 21st century. It is transmitted through sex, intravenous drug use and mother-to-child transmission. Zambia is experiencing a generalized HIV/AIDS epidemic, with a national HIV prevalence rate of 11.3% among adults ages 15 to 49 as of 2018. Per the 2000 Zambian census, the people affected by HIV/AIDS constituted 15% of the total population, amounting to one million, of which 60% were women. The pandemic results in increased number of orphans, with an estimated 600,000 orphans in the country. It was prevalent more in urban areas compared to rural and among all provinces, Copperbelt Province and Lusaka Province had higher occurrence.

The government of Zambia created an AIDS surveillance committee as early as 1986, and created an emergency plan to control the spread by 1987. By 2005, the government made antiretroviral therapy free for every individual. There are several UN and NGO voluntary organizations that are helping combat the disease.

== Background ==
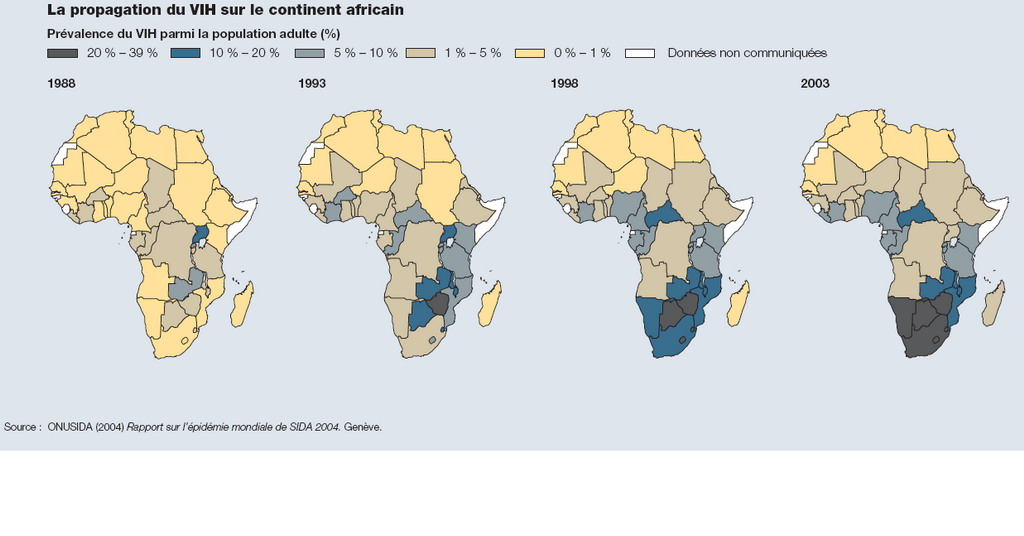
Prevalence of AIDS in Africa over the years. Zambia in 10–20% band

Human immunodeficiency virus infection and acquired immune deficiency syndrome (HIV/AIDS) is a set of conditions caused by infection with the human immunodeficiency virus (HIV). HIV is transmitted by three main ways: sexual contact, significant exposure to infected body fluids or tissues, and from mother to child during pregnancy, delivery, or breastfeeding (known as vertical transmission). There is no risk of acquiring HIV if exposed to feces, Nasal secretions, saliva, sputum, sweat, tears, urine, or vomit unless these are contaminated with blood. It is possible to be co-infected by more than one strain of HIV—a condition known as HIV superinfection.

Zambia is a landlocked, economically backward country in Africa. It is rated 166th in Human Development Index in 2006 out of a total of 177 countries based on the Human Development Report of the United Nations. By the end of 2006, a total of 39.5 million people in the world were infected by HIV and 2.9 million people died on account of ailments arising out of AIDS. Africa is the leader in AIDS with close to 60% of HIV victims and has been the leading cause of death in Africa.

== Statistics ==
As per the 2000 Zambian census, the people affected by HIV or AIDS constituted 15 per cent of the population, amounting to one million, of which 60% estimated were women. The pandemic results in increased number of orphans, with an estimated 600,000 orphans in the country. It is estimated that by 2014, 974,000 children would be orphaned. The victims are high in Lusaka and Copperbelt provinces in spite of the provinces being the most urban. As per the estimate from 2006, the HIV positive cases is 5 per cent in the age group 15–19 years, 25 per cent from 30 to 34 years and 17% from 45 to 49 years. HIV was more prevalent in urban areas compared to rural areas.

HIV infected people in provinces of Zambia
Infected with HIV	Central	Copperbelt	Eastern	Luapula	Lusaka	Northern	North-Western	Southern	Western	Grand Total
1985	1,448	6,719	779	427	1,518	539	250	23,960	1,067	36,707
1990	12,516	154,131	11,864	6,971	23,828	6,529	3,104	65,467	9,171	293,581
1995	49,682	235,586	49,750	32,447	111,753	32,452	15,855	103,202	35,208	665,935
2000	79,902	265,518	76,213	46,293	155,729	56,050	25,735	117,477	54,123	877,040
2003	86,654	270,590	81,509	48,988	159,409	62,430	27,418	120,425	57,844	915,267
2001	83,080	270,781	78,511	47,465	158,506	58,683	26,517	120,188	55,919	899,650
2002	85,490	270,945	80,157	48,426	160,240	60,802	27,045	120,347	57,252	910,704
2004	87,435	270,525	81,785	49,462	157,997	63,812	27,587	120,768	58,347	917,718
2005	87,144	268,790	81,680	49,798	155,687	65,020	27,676	120,672	58,224	914,691
2006	86,734	266,706	81,504	50,127	153,187	65,385	27,738	120,309	58,015	909,705
2007	86,238	264,358	81,228	50,435	150,408	65,567	27,772	119,829	57,673	903,508
2008	85,637	261,807	80,938	50,685	147,584	65,749	27,769	119,200	57,298	896,667
2009	84,993	259,111	80,560	50,959	144,640	65,772	27,795	118,417	56,861	889,108
2010	84,321	256,374	80,193	51,211	141,663	65,787	27,815	117,471	56,308	881,143

Estimated people killed by AIDS in provinces of Zambia
Estimated killed in AIDS	Central	Copperbelt	Eastern	Luapula	Lusaka	Northern	North-Western	Southern	Western	Grand Total
1985	028	107	012	006	024	010	004	635	019	845
1990	410	4,664	384	198	640	207	087	3,690	314	10,594
1995	2,306	17,485	2,688	1,478	4,786	1,476	655	8,397	1,684	40,955
2000	5,833	26,801	6,721	3,682	12,188	4,166	1,848	11,379	4,097	76,715
2003	7,877	27,704	8,818	4,761	15,597	5,712	2,522	12,143	5,438	90,572
2001	6,648	27,549	7,597	4,141	13,658	4,727	2,119	12,075	4,641	83,155
2002	7,311	27,798	8,316	4,486	14,758	5,247	2,336	12,331	5,076	87,659
2004	8,399	27,609	9,319	4,995	16,274	6,103	2,684	12,524	5,763	93,670
2005	8,747	27,553	9,614	5,131	16,569	6,418	2,792	12,578	5,971	95,373
2006	8,978	27,477	9,730	5,204	16,617	6,657	2,856	12,586	6,097	96,202
2007	9,098	27,405	9,719	5,232	16,468	6,807	2,887	12,574	6,150	96,340
2008	9,133	27,275	9,627	5,234	16,211	6,901	2,892	12,541	6,150	95,964
2009	9,097	27,094	9,481	5,224	15,849	6,949	2,880	12,485	6,109	95,168
2010	9,016	26,799	9,338	5,209	15,429	6,958	2,859	12,403	6,044	94,055

== Causes ==
The primary modes of HIV transmission are through sex, intravenous drug use and mother-to-child transmission. HIV prevalence rates vary considerably within the country. Infection rates are highest in cities and towns along major transportation routes and lower in rural areas with low population density. HIV prevalence among pregnant women can range from less than 10 percent in some areas to 30 percent in others. In general, however, young women ages 25 to 34 are at much higher risk of being infected by HIV than young men in the same age group. The prevalence rates are 12.7 and 3.8 percent, respectively. Risk for the disease is higher for people with sensory, intellectual, physical and psychosocial disabilities, despite the 2012 Persons with Disabilities Act. Other at-risk populations include military personnel, people in prostitution, truck drivers, and people who work in fisheries. Although men who have sex with men have a higher risk of HIV transmission than those who do not, the government-operated National AIDS Control Program does not address same-sex relationships. While Zambia's national prevalence rate remains high and shows no sign of declining, the country has been noted for its significant increases in antiretroviral treatment (ART) access.

== Measures ==
The government of Zambia created an AIDS surveillance committee as early as 1986 and created an emergency plan to control the spread by 1987. As per the plan, all blood transfusion should be screened for HIV. By 2002, the government created a mission to make antiretroviral therapy available for every individual. By 2005, the government made antiretroviral therapy free for every individual.

With about one million Zambians living with HIV/AIDS and 200,000 of these persons requiring ART, the Government of the Republic of Zambia has prioritized making ART available to all Zambians in need. A 2006 rapid assessment of the Zambian ART program identified several important constraints including: inadequate human resources for counseling, testing, and treatment-related care; gaps in supply of drugs in the public sector; increase in value of the Zambian kwacha; lack of adequate logistic/supply chain systems; stigma that hinders people from seeking treatment and care; lack of information on the availability of treatment services; a high level of misinformation about ART; need for a continuous funding stream as an accumulation of patients on ART results in a growing need for support; high cost of ART to patients, despite subsidies from the public sector; lack of referral between counseling and testing services and ART; and lack of referral between home-based care services, testing and ART.

== See also ==
- ZAMBART Project
