= Andrew D. Bernstein =

American sports photographer

- Born: New York City, U.S.
- Occupation: Sports photographer
- Employer(s): Andrew D. Bernstein Associates Photography, Inc.
- Known for: Official photographer for Los Angeles sports teams (Lakers, Clippers, Kings, Dodgers); Official USA Basketball Olympic team photographer (since 1992)
- Awards: Curt Gowdy Media Award (2018)

Andrew D. Bernstein is an American sports photographer.

== Career ==
Bernstein grew up in Brooklyn, New York, and attended Brooklyn's Midwood High School.

His company is Andrew D. Bernstein Associates Photography, Inc.; he has served as the official photographer for most of Los Angeles's professional sports teams. He is in his 33rd consecutive season and is the longest tenured NBA league photographer and official team photographer for the Lakers and Clippers. He has been the official team photographer for the Kings for the past 22 years. Bernstein is the director of photography for Crypto.com Arena and Nokia Theater LA Live and has been since the ribbon was cut in both buildings in1999 and 2007, respectively. Previously, he was the team photographer at the Dodgers from 1983 to 1994.

Bernstein has been the photographer for the United States Olympic national basketball team since the 1992 "Dream Team"; he has since extensively covered all USA gold medal-winning teams. He has worked commercially on advertising campaigns for Shaquille O'Neal, Kobe Bryant, Mia Hamm, LeBron James, and others for brands including Nike, Reebok, Adidas, Pepsi, Coca-Cola and Icy Hot.

His work has been showcased in many exhibitions over the years. He is one of only four photographers whose work is on permanent display at the Naismith Memorial Basketball Hall of Fame in Springfield, Massachusetts. He was inducted into the National Jewish Sports Hall of Fame in 2013. He is the host of Through The Lens, which is a regular feature on the Lakers channel on Time Warner Cable SportsNet LA. It is a unique perspective of Lakers history through his photos which Bernstein hosts with a famous guest.

== Books ==
- NBA Hoop Shots: Classic Moments from a Super Era. David Stern (Foreword). Woodford. 1996. ISBN 0-942627-24-5.
- Jackson, Phil (2010). Journey to the Ring: Behind the Scenes with the 2010 NBA Champion Lakers. Time Capsule Press LLC. ISBN 978-0-9823242-2-6. Archived from the original on 2013-09-22.
- Bryant, Kobe. The Mamba Mentality: How I Play. MCD, 2018.
