= Where the Crawdads Sing (soundtrack) =

Where the Crawdads Sing (Original Motion Picture Soundtrack)

Film score by Mychael Danna
- Released: July 15, 2022
- Recorded: 2021–2022
- Genre: Film score
- Length: 43:53
- Label: Mercury Classics
- Producers: Mychael Danna; Taylor Swift; Aaron Dessner

Mychael Danna chronology
Return to Space (2022)	Where the Crawdads Sing (2022)	My Father's Dragon (2022)

Where the Crawdads Sing (Original Motion Picture Soundtrack) is the soundtrack to the 2022 film of the same name released on July 15, 2022 by Mercury Classics. It features the original score composed by Canadian composer Mychael Danna, and an original song "Carolina" written and performed by American singer-songwriter Taylor Swift. According to Danna, the score's "unique instrumentation creates haunting melodies that are directly inspired by the North Carolina marshlands, and meticulously crafted to foster an almost fable-like sense of time and place".

== Development ==
The original score is composed by Mychael Danna, who used sea shells and conchs for creating the music, a technique earlier used in ancient times. The musician, Don Chilton, whom Danna previously worked with had collected those shells and played it as a French horn, which Danna shared in his Instagram account. Danna said, "He uses his fist to kind of pitch it and so he can play pretty accurate melodies, which I've never seen a shell player do before. Usually, they just blow in it and [they] make a broad noise and that's kind of all you get. But he does this and it's just got this primordial, deep, haunting sound to it that." The sound created a "mysterious, deep marsh and ancient sound" which is a "setting of life and death and endless cycle".

"I think I used shells a couple of times but in more specific world settings. I think in India, they play the shell in a certain way. And it has certain religious significance as well in Hebrew culture in Israel. There's also, very famously, another shell that's played and again, it's got cultural and religious significance, so those were played in the scores that I used them [and] where I played them how they're supposed to be played in those cultures, which is not the way we did it here."

— Mychael Danna, on the use of shells as instruments in Where the Crawdads Sing.

Much of the film is set in North Carolina, which led Danna to create a "sonic soundscape" for the film. Excluding the shell sounds, he had used Americana folk-based music with the local musicians, which use, banjo, fiddle and autoharp, and an orchestral music. The film had "sonic textures" that are "natural, acoustic sounds but they sometimes sound electronic". These sounds were manipulated to get the "swamp sound, which is dark, mysterious, and intimidating". These manipulated sounds are literally like "a double bass being played in an unusual way, like playing up above the fretboard or below the bridge and then slowing it down and so on like that. Those dark tones are a little hard to identify what they are, but they just sound kind of organic, but also a little frightening, mysterious, and dark."

== Release ==
The soundtrack featured an original song, "Carolina" written and performed by American singer-songwriter Taylor Swift. The song was used as snippets in the promotional trailers for the film, and was released as a single on June 24, 2022 by Republic Records. It was written for nearly one-and-a-half years, even before the film entered production, whereas much of the score has been recorded during post-production. Swift said that she "got absolutely lost in [the book] when [she] read it years ago" and "wanted to create something haunting and ethereal" for the film when she heard it was being produced. The song is played in the ending credits of the film.

A snippet of the track "Am I Your Girlfriend Now?" was released through Deadline Hollywood on July 14, 2022, and the full soundtrack was released along with the film, the following day. It was released by Mercury Classics through its revamped label for releasing film scores and soundtracks, under the name Mercury Classics Soundtrack & Score, operated by Decca Records and Verve Label Group. The label also released the soundtracks for Crimes of the Future and Rogue Agent.

== Track listing ==
All music is composed by Mychael Danna except where noted.

No.	Title	Writer(s)	Producer	Length
1.	"Carolina"	Taylor Swift	Swift; Aaron Dessner	4:24
2.	"Out Yonder Where The Crawdads Sing"			2:34
3.	"A Swamp Knows All About Death"			2:55
4.	"They Called Me Kya"			1:28
5.	"The Marsh Girl"			1:09
6.	"Mussels For Jumpin'"			1:55
7.	"A Feather From Tate"			2:07
8.	"Am I Your Girlfriend Now?"			2:12
9.	"Snow Geese"			2:18
10.	"Another Season Passed"			0:47
11.	"You're Never Going To Come Back"			1:14
12.	"The Fourth Of July"			1:52
13.	"View From The Fire Tower"			1:05
14.	"Clothes From Miss Mabel"			1:39
15.	"Chase Andrews"			1:37
16.	"Red Wool Fibers"			1:24
17.	"I Just Wanna Talk"			1:34
18.	"With Royalties To Follow"			0:56
19.	"We The Jury"			2:15
20.	"It Was Always Tate"			2:41
21.	"I Am Every Shell Wasted Upon The Shore"			4:32
22.	"Teach You To Read"			2:44

== Reception ==
The score received generally positive reviews. Jonathan Broxton of Movie Music UK wrote, "the lack of strong thematic content beyond the main theme for Kya may result in some people dismissing it out of hand as being nothing but texture. Furthermore, an affinity for prominent country textures led by fiddles and banjos is also a requirement because the score is awash in them from start to finish. It may be that the score just happened to catch me in with the right mood, but whatever the case may be, Where the Crawdads Sing hit me right in the sweet spot, providing a slightly melancholy but wholly beautiful evocation of a unique place, and a unique girl at the center of a very traumatic story."

== Accolades ==
Award	Date of ceremony	Category	Recipient(s)	Result	Ref.
Hollywood Music in Media Awards	November 16, 2022	Best Original Score in a Feature Film	Mychael Danna	Nominated	
Hollywood Music in Media Awards	November 16, 2022	Best Original Song in a Feature Film	Taylor Swift ("Carolina")	Nominated	
Grammy Awards	February 5, 2023	Best Song Written for Visual Media	Taylor Swift ("Carolina")	Nominated	
