= The Mamba Mentality: How I Play =

Autobiography of NBA player Kobe Bryant

- Author: Kobe Bryant
- Publisher: MCD (Farrar, Straus and Giroux)
- Publication date: October 23, 2018
- Pages: 208
- ISBN: 978-0-374-71915-9

The Mamba Mentality: How I Play is an autobiographical book by NBA player Kobe Bryant in which he provides personal insights into his life and basketball career. The book was published by Macmillan Publishers on October 28, 2018, with photography and an afterword by sports photographer Andrew D. Bernstein.

== Synopsis ==
The book is broken up into several sections in which Bryant describes the progression of his mentality and training throughout his career. Each section is heavily accompanied by visuals.

=== Foreword and introduction ===
The foreword was written by Bryant's former Los Angeles Lakers teammate Pau Gasol. He begins by telling the story of his 2008 trade from the Memphis Grizzlies to the Lakers, where Bryant inspired Gasol to be a part of the team's goal of winning the NBA Championship that year. Gasol speaks to Bryant's many qualities including his attention to detail and persistence in telling the team that "to be a better player, you have to prepare, prepare, and prepare some more" Gasol concludes by touching on Bryant's impact on him not only as a player but as a "brother" and states that the book accurately shows the reader Bryant's mentality.

The introduction, written by Bryant's former Lakers coach Phil Jackson, is titled "Be Prepared for an Adventure in High-Level Basketball". Jackson describes how the mixture of Bernstein's visuals and Bryant's insights can make the reader a better player.

=== Process ===
Bryant begins by detailing how he physically and mentally prepares for playing basketball. In "When it Came to Basketball, I Had no Fear", he describes how he wanted to be the best player possible from a young age. Bryant speaks of his midnight workouts sometimes going from "11(pm)...get a few hours in, rest for a few hours, then get back to the gym around 5 to 7(am)", studying game film, and going through physical therapy to prepare his body and mind for games. His physical therapy routine consists of ice baths, contrast therapy, stretching, and taping.

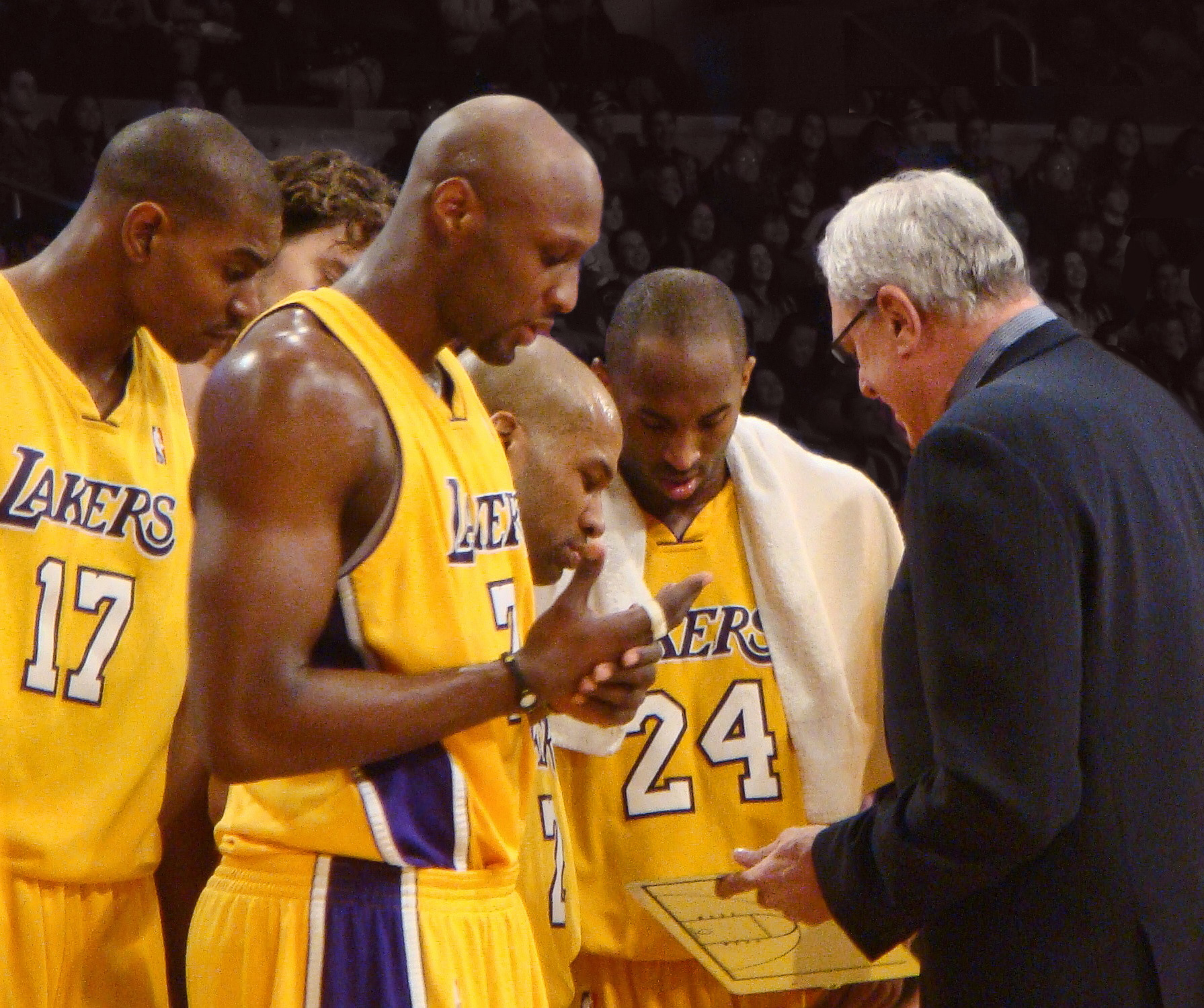
Phil Jackson coaching Lakers (Kobe Bryant, Lamar Odom, and Andrew Bynum pictured)

Bryant then begins to highlight the important staff members and players in his life who contributed to his process as an athlete. He first cites Judy Seto and Gary Vitti, both tenure trainers with the Los Angeles Lakers organization, as making him feel "better, stronger, and more prepared" when he worked with them. Additionally, he gives recognition to various sports figures who made an impact on him as a player, including Jerry West, Magic Johnson, Kareem Abdul-Jabbar, Muhammad Ali, Bill Russell, Byron Scott, and Phil Jackson.

On the topic of injuries, Bryant speaks to his personal difficulties with them and how he was forced to change his process and perspectives on the game. In December 2009, Bryant fractured his right index finger and it forced him to change his shooting form by making his middle finger the "point of release". However, his "personal Mount Everest" came with his ruptured Achilles tendon on April 12, 2013, in a game against the Golden State Warriors. After speaking with Vitti and surgeon Patrick Soon-Shiong, he underwent surgery and saw this as a new challenge for himself as it "was not going to let it beat" him.

The section finishes with Bryant reflecting on his leadership with the United States men's national basketball team and the Lakers. With Team USA, he describes himself as "the alpha in the locker room" and states that younger teammates looked up to him for guidance He describes his leadership style as "making [people] uncomfortable" and daring "people to be their best selves", but tailoring his approach to different teammates. He finally defines the "mamba mentality" as being about the "journey and not the result", and the central purpose for the book is to continue to allow people to "find inspiration" in his lessons on basketball and his mindset.

=== Craft ===
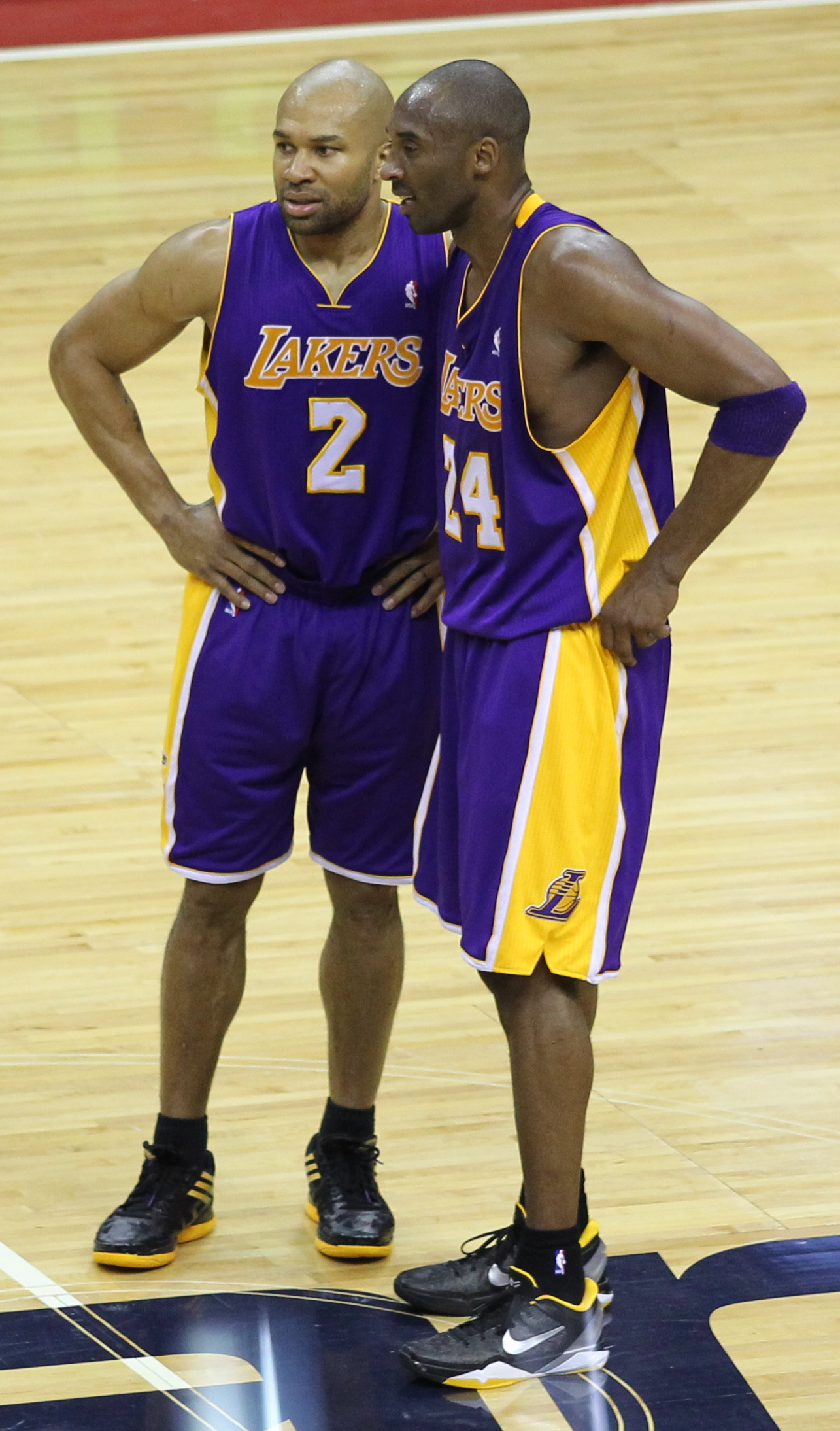
Kobe Bryant and Derek Fisher, 2012

In "Craft", Bryant speaks of his technique decisions on the court and the fellow players who inspired his game. Throughout this section, Bryant provides detailed annotations and drawings on game photos to articulate his thought process in that moment. He acknowledges his teammates Shaquille O'Neal, Caron Butler, Lamar Odom, and Derek Fisher for being "special players" and helping him learn more about technique. Bryant also recognizes his great competitors in Kevin Garnett, Allen Iverson, Ruben Patterson, and many more, and how he approached playing each differently based on their strengths and weaknesses. Bryant further details his opponents' skills while mentioning the important areas of focus on the court including footwork, hand-eye coordination, "sizing up the defense", and contact, as he "enjoyed hitting, and getting hit".

Bryant's writing ends with going "deeper than hoops"; he discusses his connection with Pau Gasol and highlights the highs and lows that come with the sport. He expresses his value in winning championships and how losses and wins do not change his game as he is "in the gym the same time after losing 50 games as [he] is after winning a championship". On the final page, Bryant reflects on the important experiences and skills basketball has given him. He learned artistry and creativity, without which he "would not have an Emmy... would not have an Oscar" and how he planned to take the game "everywhere" in his post-basketball career.

=== Facts and figures ===
The third section displays various facts and figures regarding Bryant's life and career.

33643 career regular season points	fourth most all-time behind LeBron James, Kareem Abdul-Jabbar, and Karl Malone
81 points	third most points ever scored in an NBA game
37 years old	Bryant's age when he scored 60 points in his final NBA game
20 seasons	Devoted to the Lakers, the longest tenure by any guard in NBA history
18 years old	When Bryant made his first start, he became the youngest player to win the NBA Slam Dunk Contest, and the youngest player to score in a playoff game
5 championships	The three-peat of 2000–2002, and 2009–2010
2	jersey numbers (retired in Los Angeles: 8 & 24), Finals MVP Awards, scoring titles (in consecutive years), and Olympic gold medals (in two attempts)

=== Chronology ===
"Chronology" lists important milestone dates in Bryant's career. Dates range from the day he was selected in the NBA draft in June 1996 to the final game of his career in April 2016.

=== Afterword ===
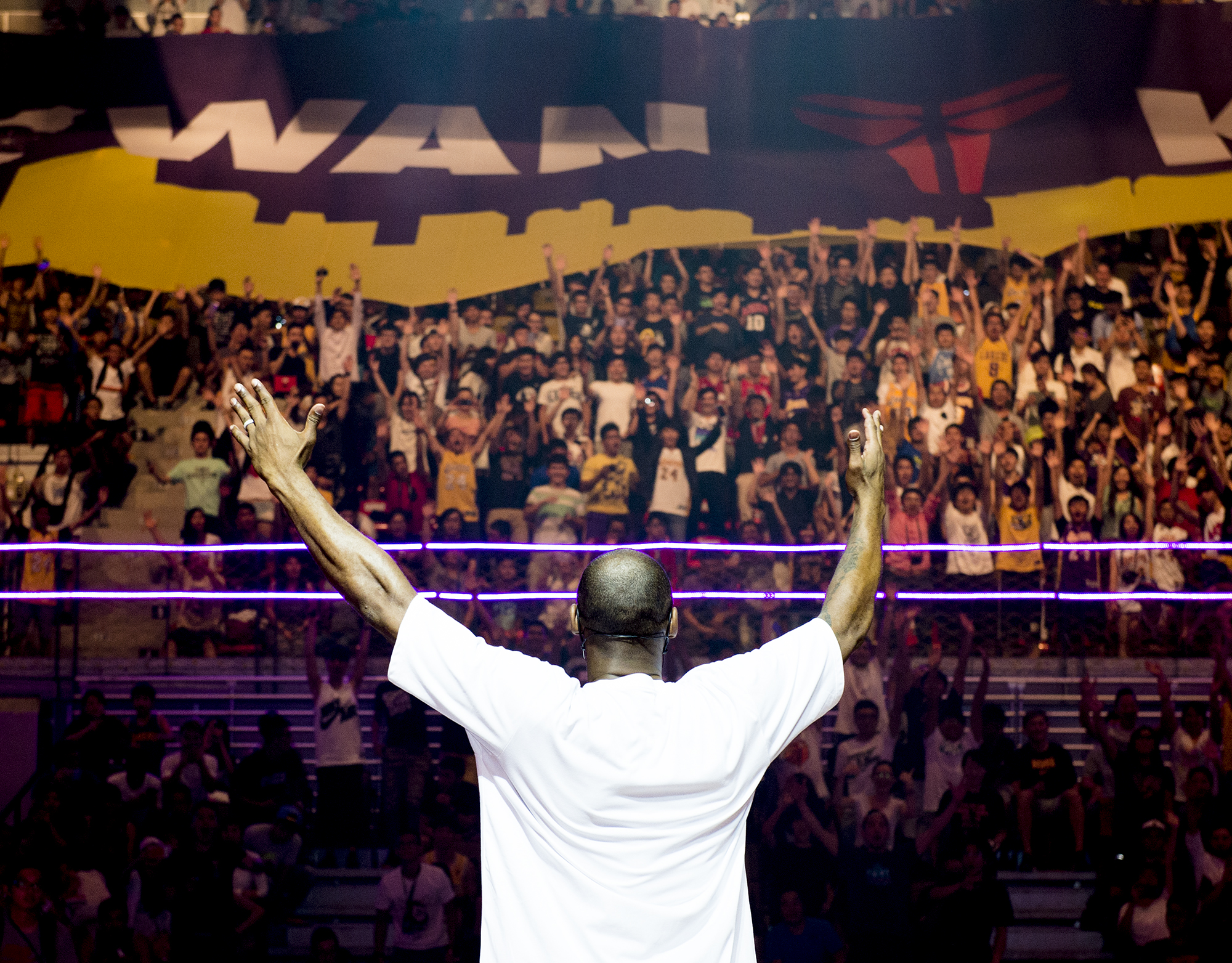
Bryant at event in Taiwan, 2015

The afterword was written by the book's photographer Andrew D. Bernstein, an American sports photographer in his 33rd season as the official photographer for the Los Angeles Lakers. Bernstein highlights momentous moments from Bryant's career and claims that Bryant was amongst the few NBA players who were "consistently dynamic and exciting to photograph, game after game, year after year".

== Reception ==
As of July 2020, the book spent 27 weeks on The New York Times Best Seller list, peaking at number 1 in the Sports and Fitness Category.

=== Critical reviews ===
The books editor at USA Today, Jocelyn McClurg, described The Mamba Mentality as "the next best thing to a courtside seat watching Bryant drive to the basket during his glory days with the L.A. Lakers." Kirkus Reviews reflected upon the visual elements of the book, calling it "a visually beautiful presentation" thanks to the photos by Bernstein. Booklist described the emphasized the book's uniqueness with "Bernstein's photography...it's wonderful" and "sets this book apart from the competition".
