= Where the Crawdads Sing =

2018 novel by Delia Owens

- Author: Delia Owens
- Genre: Literary fiction
- Publisher: G. P. Putnam's Sons
- Publication date: August 14, 2018
- Pages: 368
- ISBN: 978-0-7352-1911-3

Where the Crawdads Sing is a 2018 coming-of-age murder mystery novel by American zoologist Delia Owens. The story follows two timelines that slowly intertwine. The first timeline describes the life and adventures of a young girl named Kya as she grows up isolated in the marshes of North Carolina. The second timeline follows an investigation into the apparent murder of Chase Andrews, a local celebrity of Barkley Cove, a fictional coastal town of North Carolina. By April 2023, the book had sold over 18 million copies. A film adaptation was released in July 2022.

Scholars have commented on the novel from the perspective of ecocriticism, and on its depiction of the American South as it was in the 1950s and 1960s. Owens's profession, the study of animal behavior, provides material for the book, the violence and deception in nature serving as metaphors for how the men in the story behave towards Kya. Critics have noted that Owens's involvement in a murder in Zambia, too, is reflected in the plot.

== Plot summary ==
=== Part I: The Marsh ===
In 1952, six-year-old Kya watches her mother leave her abusive alcoholic husband. While Kya waits in vain for her mother's return, her older siblings leave. Her father burns her mother's clothes and paintings.

Alone with her father, Kya learns to fish. He gives her his knapsack for her shells and feathers. Unable to read or write, Kya makes paintings of the objects, and the marsh's creatures and shorelines, with watercolors her mother left behind.

One day Kya finds a letter from her mother in the mailbox and leaves it for her father to find. He burns the letter. He returns to drinking and takes long gambling trips; eventually, he fails to return. She survives by gardening and trading mussels and smoked fish for money and fuel from Jumpin', a black man who owns a gasoline station at the boat dock. She makes friends with Jumpin' and his wife Mabel, who gives her clothes.

The Barkley Cove townspeople nickname her "The Marsh Girl". On the only day she goes to school, the schoolchildren laugh at her; a pastor's wife calls her "nasty" and "filthy". She becomes friendly with Tate Walker, who fishes in the marsh. When Kya gets lost, Tate leads her home in his boat. Years later, he gives her rare bird feathers, then teaches her to read and write. They form a romantic relationship until Tate leaves for college. He promises to return, but leaves without saying goodbye.

=== Part II: The Swamp ===
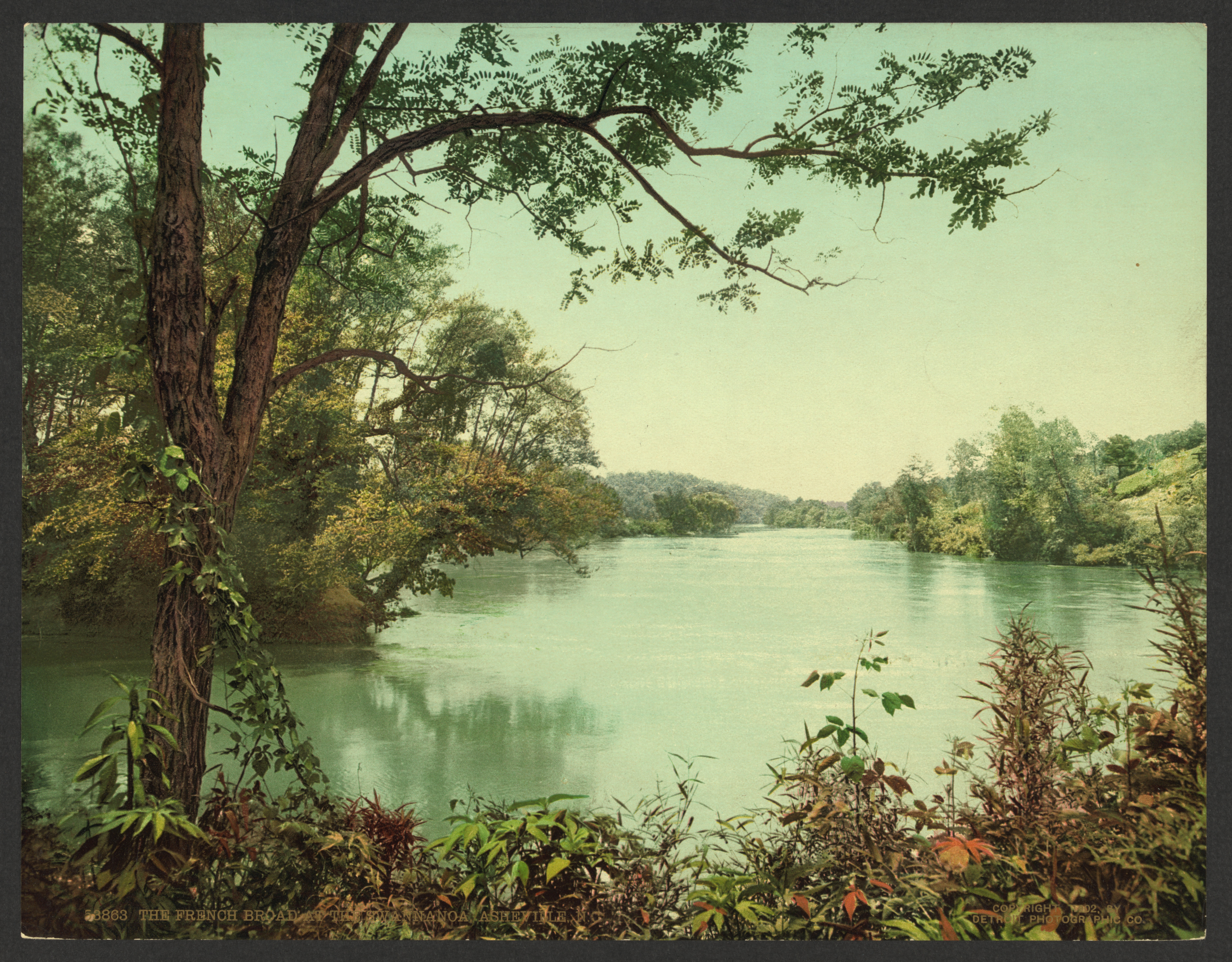
Delia Owens's novel is set in a North Carolina marsh like the one illustrated above.

Chase Andrews, Barkley Cove's quarterback and playboy, invites Kya, aged 19, to a picnic, and tries to have sex with her. He later apologizes, and the two form a romantic relationship. He shows her an abandoned fire tower, and she gives him a necklace of a shell he found during their picnic, strung on a rawhide string. She believes Chase's promises of marriage, and they have sex in a motel. The relationship ends when she sees in the newspaper that he is engaged.

Tate, graduated from college, visits Kya and attempts to apologize. She rejects him, but lets him inside her shack. He is impressed by her collection of seashells. He urges her to publish a reference book on them, which she does, with another on seabirds. With the money, she pays back taxes and fixes her home. Her brother Jodie, now in the Army, returns, telling her that their mother had been mentally ill and had died of leukemia two years earlier. He says he doesn't know where the other siblings are. He advises Kya to give Tate a second chance, then departs.

Later, relaxing in a cove, Chase confronts Kya, and attempts to rape her. She fends him off and threatens to kill him if he doesn't leave her alone. The encounter is witnessed by two fishermen. Kya fears that reporting the assault would be futile as the town would blame her for "being loose". The next week, she sees Chase boating up to her shack; she hides until he leaves.

Kya is invited to meet her publisher; she takes a bus to meet him. After she returns the next day, Chase is found dead beneath the fire tower, with no tracks or fingerprints nearby. The sheriff suspects murder. He gathers conflicting statements. He learns the shell necklace Kya gave to Chase was missing when his body was found, even though he wore it the night he died. Kya was seen leaving Barkley Cove before the murder, then returning the day after Chase died. There were red wool fibers on Chase's jacket from Kya's hat. Convinced she is the culprit, the sheriff arrests her for first-degree murder.

At Kya's trial, only contradictory and circumstantial evidence is provided. Kya's lawyer debunks the prosecutor's arguments, as there is no evidence that Kya was at the fire tower when Chase died. The jury finds her not guilty. She returns home and reconciles with Tate. They live together in her shack until she dies peacefully in her boat at the age of 64. Searching for Kya's will, Tate finds a box with some of her old possessions. It contains a poem that alludes to Chase's murder, and the shell necklace Chase wore. Tate burns the poems and the rawhide string before dropping the shell onto the beach. Kya is buried on her property near the shack.

== Major themes ==
=== Ecocriticism ===
Ecocriticism analyses the interplay of literature and ecology. Scholars have examined Where the Crawdads Sing for its depiction of wild nature and its contrast with town life and attitudes. Annika Salisbury examines three ecocritical perspectives on the novel: postcolonial, ecofeminist, and climate change. She writes that in a postcolonial analysis, both Kya and nature are "othered" at the start, but move to being respected. In an ecofeminist analysis, Kya and nature are described as unexpectedly active and interconnected, and able to bring about change. And in a climate change ecocritical analysis, readers are indirectly encouraged to care about the natural world. Corin Kraft writes that the novel provides both "a socio-historical insight into the racially segregated and hierarchically classed South of the 1950s and 1960s" and an ecocritical view of how Americans have viewed and made use of North Carolina's natural environment. In her view, Owens ambivalently involves literature too in the interchange, as Kya's writings simultaneously educate her (fictional) readers and accelerate tourism in the region, harming both local businesses and the wetlands.

=== 'Wild woman' and 'Southern Gothic' ===
The scholar of humanities Marwa Talib Naji suggests that "the wild woman" is to be contrasted specifically with the traditional place of women in the South of the United States. She writes that the Southern Gothic genre in American literature addresses issues of class, gender roles, and race in that region. In Where the Crawdads Sing, she writes, the protagonist Kya exemplifies the Southern Gothic archetype of the wild woman before she is "confined to the house space". Adrian Horton, in The Guardian, describes the book as "a fantasy of grit and purity", offering "a seductive blend of romance, murder mystery and feral coming-of-age". He comments that there are two timelines: a murder mystery, and the tale of Kya's growing up alone in the wild. In his view, the book's construction is not well conceived: in particular, the "implausible twist ending ... undercuts almost everything that comes before, if you think about it for more than two seconds". Further, he writes, the book treats the complications of relationships, physical hardship, and racism as "wallpaper", preferring to focus on its "central nature girl fantasy of self-reliance". The author Mark Lawson, also in The Guardian, calls Kya "a vivid and original character", noting that Owens manages to show how Kya uses calculation and instinct to get herself "into and out of difficulties", mostly avoiding the trap of making her a superhero. He comments that a coming-of-age romance could be sentimental, but that this tendency is countered by the crime fiction side of the novel.

=== Ethology and human behavior ===
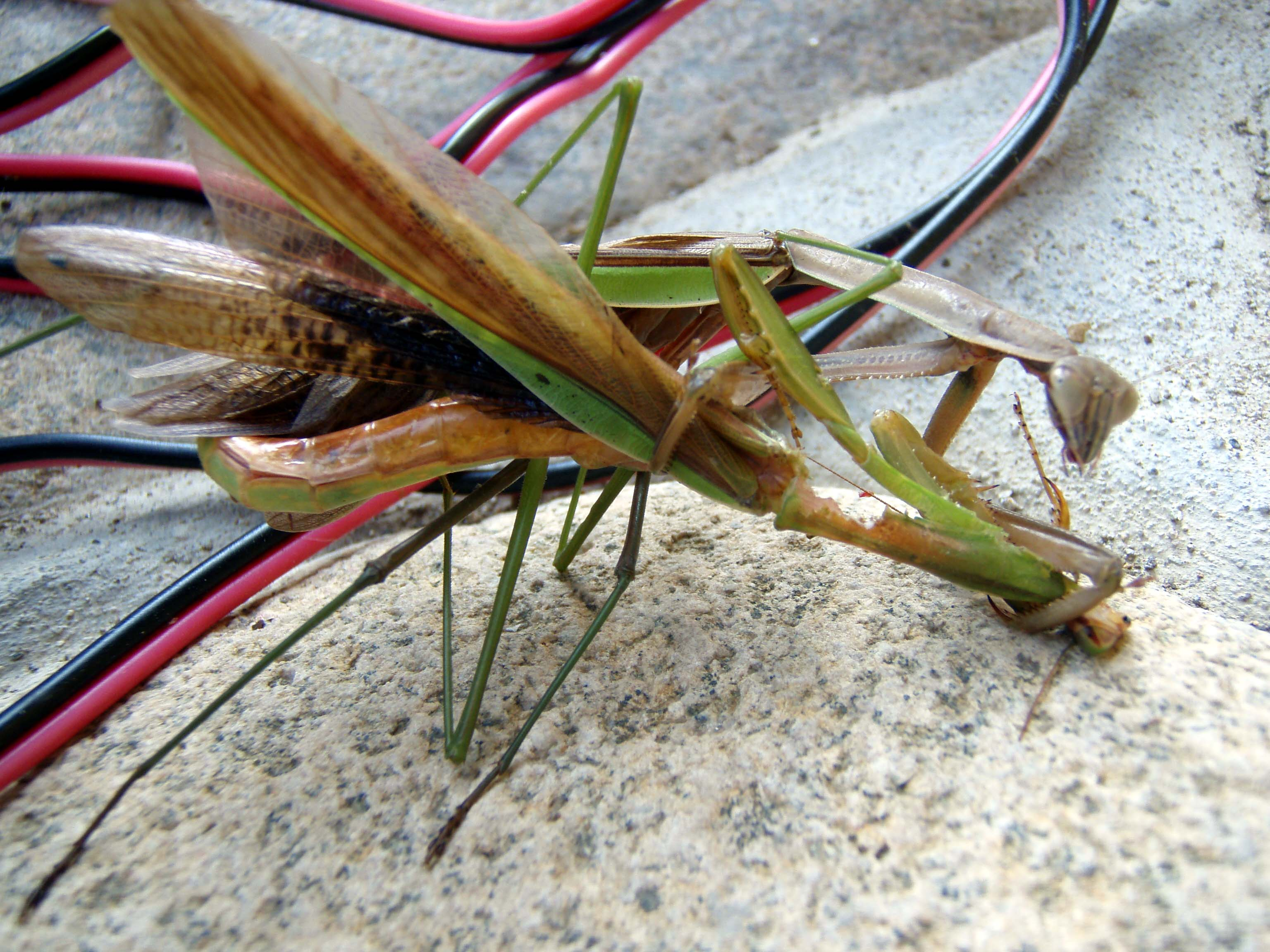
Sexual cannibalism: a female mantis eats her mate, as Owens describes in the book.

The theme of ethology, Delia Owens' profession, the study of animal behavior, runs through the book. Lawson notes that Kya reads about ethology, including an article titled "Sneaky Fuckers", where she learns about female fireflies, who use their coded flashing light signal to lure a male of another species to his death, and about female mantises who lure a male mate and start eating the mate's head and thorax while his abdomen is still copulating with her. Lawson comments that this "spectacularly extend[s]" the trope of having a wildlife documentary in the background while the characters engage in violence or sex. He adds that the biological "anecdotes hover as metaphors for the behaviour of males in the story".

Female fireflies draw in strange males with dishonest signals and eat them; mantis females devour their own mates. Female insects, Kya thought, know how to deal with their lovers.

=== Crime story ===
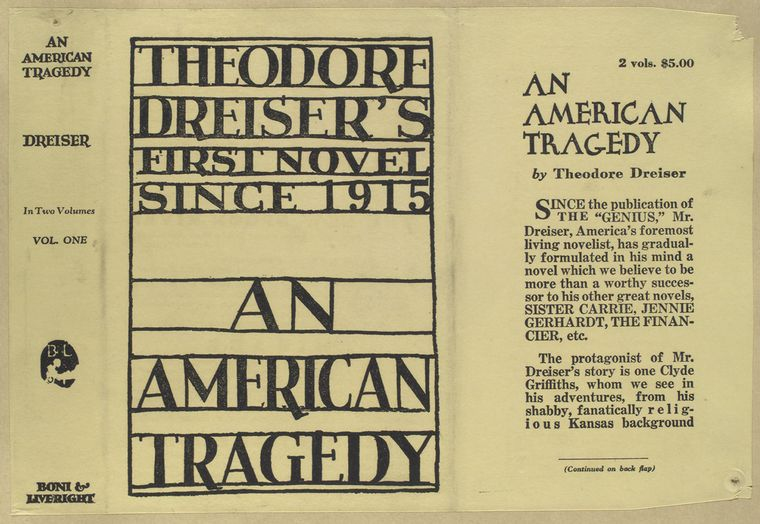
Where the Crawdads Sing has been likened to Theodore Dreiser's 1925 novel An American Tragedy.

Lawson likens Where the Crawdads Sing to Theodore Dreiser's 1925 novel An American Tragedy. In his view, its tale of "social competition and violent death" resembles a reworking of that melodramatic tale, with its mix of tension and precise social detail.

Jeffrey Goldberg, in The Atlantic, writes that aspects of Kya's life and the novel's narrative choices, including its attitude towards its black characters, are said to be reminiscent of Owens's time in Zambia, where she, her then husband, and his son are still wanted for questioning in the killing of an alleged poacher captured on film in a 1996 report by ABC News. Owens is not a suspect, but is considered a possible witness, co-conspirator, or accessory. The Los Angeles Times comments that the novel "seems to draw from [Owens's] own involvement in the 1995 murder", describing the story of her time in Zambia as a "tumultuous history".

=== Multiple themes ===
Douglas T. Kenrick, for Psychology Today, writes that the book's success surprised its publishers, as it did not fit into any of their categories such as crime, nature, or romance. Instead, he suggests, it may have appealed to readers because it engages with what he names the "7 fundamental motives" in life. These include survival (Kya's marsh survival), gaining status (she moves from pariah to published author), and finding and retaining a mate (she is deserted by two lovers, finds true love). The scholar Maria-Magdalena Lăpădat writes that the multifaceted nature of the novel makes it a valuable resource for teaching English as a foreign language.

== Reception ==
Where the Crawdads Sing, Owens's debut novel, was published by G. P. Putnam's Sons on August 14, 2018. The book was selected for Reese Witherspoon's book club in September that year, and for Barnes & Noble's Best Books of 2018.

By December 2019, the book had sold over 4.5 million copies, and it sold more print copies in 2019 than any other adult title, fiction or non-fiction. It topped The New York Times Fiction Best Sellers of 2019 and The New York Times Fiction Best Sellers of 2020. By February 2022, the book had spent 150 weeks on the best seller list. By April 2022, the book had sold 12 million copies; by July 2022, 15 million copies; and by April 2023, 18 million copies, making it one of the best-selling books of all time.

HITC notes that "crawdads" of the book's title is an American slang word for crayfish. These crustaceans cannot sing, but when Kya's mother encourages her to explore the marsh, she often says: "Go as far as you can — way out yonder where the crawdads sing." When Tate also uses the phrase, Kya asks him the meaning and he replies: "Just means far in the bush where critters are wild, still behaving like critters." Owens's mother had used the phrase when she was a child. "Crawdad" is a regional term, and the book's success sparked a rise in online queries about the word's meaning.

== Film adaptation ==
A film adaptation of the novel was released on July 15, 2022 in the US, having been scheduled for July 22, 2022. The film received mixed reviews from critics, who praised Daisy Edgar-Jones's performance as Kya, and the cinematography, but found the film's overall tone incoherent. Audience reception was more positive, and the film became a box office success, grossing $144.3 million worldwide on a $24 million budget.
