= Untamed (memoir) =

2020 memoir by Glennon Doyle

- Cover of first edition
- Author: Glennon Doyle
- Audio read by: Glennon Doyle
- Cover artist: Leslie David (illustration); Lynn Buckley (design)
- Language: English
- Subject: Memoir
- Publisher: The Dial Press
- Publication date: March 10, 2020
- Publication place: United States
- Media type: Print (hardcover), e-book, audiobook
- Pages: 352
- ISBN: 978-1-9848-0125-8 (hardcover)
- OCLC: 1139013161
- Dewey Decimal: 306.89/3
- LC Class: CT275.M469125 A3 2020
- Preceded by: Love Warrior
- Followed by: We Can Do Hard Things
- Website: untamedbook.com

Untamed is a 2020 memoir by Glennon Doyle. It was published by The Dial Press on March 10, 2020. It is her third memoir following her works Love Warrior and Carry on, Warrior.

The book debuted at number one on The New York Times nonfiction best-seller list. where it stayed for seven weeks. As of May 31, 2020, the book has spent 10 weeks on the list.

== Reception ==
Publishers Weekly wrote, "This testament to female empowerment and self-love, with an endearing coming-out story at the center, will delight readers."

Kirkus Reviews called it a "lucid, inspiring chronicle of female empowerment and the rewards of self-awareness and renewal."

== Television adaptation ==
On August 6, 2020, Bad Robot and Warner Bros. Television Studios acquired the rights to adapt the memoir into a television series after a competitive bidding process. Doyle was set to co-write the first episode and serve as an executive producer alongside Jessie Nelson, Ben Stephenson, and Rachel Rusch Rich.

In February 2022, Doyle revealed in her We Can Do Hard Things podcast that Sarah Paulson was cast in the lead role.

By March 2024, Paulson was officially confirmed in the role, with Krista Vernoff adapting the memoir, and Jessie Nelson, Alexandre Schmitt, and Andrew Stearn joining as executive producers under their Trip the Light Productions banner.
