= LGBTQ rights in Zambia =

- Zambia
- Legal status: Illegal since 1911 (as Rhodesia)
- Penalty: Imprisonment: 14 years − possible life sentence
- Gender identity: No
- Military: No
- Discrimination protections: Limited protections based on health and broadcasting

Family rights
- Recognition of relationships: No recognition of same-sex unions
- Adoption: No

Lesbian, gay, bisexual, transgender, and queer (LGBTQ) people in Zambia face significant challenges not experienced by non-LGBTQ residents. Same-sex sexual activity is illegal for both men and women in Zambia. Formerly a colony of the British Empire, Zambia inherited the laws and legal system of its colonial occupiers upon independence in 1964. Laws concerning homosexuality have largely remained unchanged since then, and homosexuality is covered by sodomy laws that also proscribe bestiality. Social attitudes toward LGBTQ people are mostly negative and coloured by perceptions that homosexuality is immoral and a form of insanity. However, in recent years, younger generations are beginning to show slightly more positive and open minded attitudes towards their LGBTQ peers.

LGBTQ persons are subjected to human rights violations by police and authorities. Subject to arbitrary arrest and detentions, they suffer violence and abuse in custody. Police are reported to threaten and extort LGBTQ persons. Those prosecuted for same-sex conduct are subjected to the use of forced anal examinations for evidence-gathering purposes. Such procedures are invasive and traumatic and are widely condemned by medical authorities and human rights groups; they are discredited for the purpose of providing any evidence of same-sex sexual activity.

Other serious societal discrimination and abuse is directed towards LGBTQ persons. They may be targeted threats, stalking, vandalism, violence, and other hate crimes, including murders. LGBTQ people routinely face community harassment and discrimination, with little recourse to assistance from police or government.

In recent years, the onset of the internet has led to more positive support and opinions towards the LGBTQ community. The fast digitization of the country has led to exposure to more people and stories from different facets of life. This in turn has led to more open minded attitudes amongst the growing youth reducing discrimination and prejudice among people of different communities.

== History ==
In 1998, the Zambian government claimed that homosexuality was "a Norwegian conspiracy", after a Norwegian ambassador defended a gay activist.

== Law regarding same-sex sexual activity ==
Same-sex sexual activity is proscribed by Sections 155 and 156 of Zambia's penal code (as amended 1933 and repealed and replaced by Act No. 15 of 2005). (Note: Some contiguous provisions of "Unnatural offences" are omitted intentionally: Section 157 of the code is not relevant; it covers "harmful cultural practices" on children, such as female genital mutilation, and other abuse of minors. Likewise, the special provisions of Section 155: §i, §ii, §iii, cover only child sexual abuse, carrying penalties of imprisonment of at least twenty-five years with the possibility of imprisonment for life; while 155 §(b) proscribes bestiality. In the "Indecent practices" section, 158 §(1) and §(2) are relevant, although they include offences against children; in the code, these offences against minors are combined in the same clauses as "gross indecency" applying between adults.) The law criminalizes consensual same-sex sexual conduct, with penalties upon conviction for engaging in "acts against the order of nature" of fifteen years' to life imprisonment. Conviction under the lesser charge of "gross indecency" carries a penalty of up to fourteen years' imprisonment.

=== "Unnatural" offences ===
Section 155 ("Unnatural Offences") criminalizes homosexual sex as a felony punishable by terms of imprisonment which range from fifteen years, up to a life sentence.

Any person who- (a) has carnal knowledge of any person against the order of nature; or ... (c) permits a male person to have carnal knowledge of him or her against the order of nature; commits a felony and liable, upon conviction, to imprisonment for a term not less than fifteen years and may be liable to imprisonment for life

Section 156 imposes imprisonment for seven years for any attempt "to commit any of the offences specified in section one hundred and fifty-five".

=== "Indecent" practices ===
The lesser offence of "indecent practices between persons of the same sex" is "any act of gross indecency" that a man commits with a man [s. 158, §(1)] or a woman commits with another woman [s. 158, §(2)]. These offences attract penalties of terms of imprisonment of between seven years and fourteen years.

Although no specific criminal penalty is set out, Section 158, §(3) as amended in 2005, (Note: The version prior to the 2005 amendment (as amended by No. 26 of 1933), had the similar provision that referred only to (adult) males: Section 158: Any male person who, whether in public or private, commits any act of gross indecency with another male person, or procures another male person to commit any act of gross indecency with him, or attempts to procure the commission of any such act by any male person with himself or with another male person, whether in public or private, is guilty of a felony and is liable to imprisonment for five years.) is to regulate any same-sex sexual contact between minors, applying to:

A child who, whether in public or private, commits any act of gross indecency with another child of the same sex or attempts to procure the commission of any such act by any person with the child's self or with another child or person of the same sex, whether in public or private, commits an offence and is liable, to such community service or counseling as the court may determine in the best interests of the child.

There is no similar legislative provision in the penal code that covers sexual conduct between minors of opposite sex.

=== Legal action and reform ===
Although Zambia has maintained a strict stance against any form of LGBTQ activity, there have been a number of efforts by the UN to get Zambia to change its policies and law regarding same-sex activity. These efforts have been largely in vain as Zambia sustained its policies.

Zambian legal policies regarding same-sex activity have effectively bred a national environment of homophobia which has made it to where that the justice system severely disadvantages LGBTQ identifying individuals. The justice system fails to recognize and protect the lives of LGBTQ citizens which has in effect opened the window for citizen-based militia activity against LGBTQ individuals. The US Department of State's 2010 report on human rights in Zambia states that:

...the government enforces law that criminalizes homosexual conduct and did not respond to societal discrimination ... according to LGBT advocacy groups, societal violence occurred, as did societal discrimination in employment, housing, and access to education or health care ... LGBT groups reported frequent attacks and discrimination in the neighborhoods in which they operated. Activists reported regular harassment, including threats via text message and e-mail, vandalism, stalking, and outright violence.

In April 2013, Paul Kasonkomona, a notable Zambian LGBTQ activist, was arrested for speaking about LBGT and HIV related issues on a local TV station. Kasonkomona was charged with the crime of "soliciting in a public place for immoral purpose." Also in 2013, two gay-identifying men were beaten outside of a nightclub after being found in a "compromising position". They decided against pressing charges out of the fear of being jailed themselves.

In May 2014, citizens of the Marapodi area of Lusaka apprehended two women who were suspected lesbians. They captured the women, brought them to the local police station, and demanded their arrest.

In January 2015, an openly gay man was attacked by a mob which reportedly included three police officers.

Zambia has abstained from/denied a number of reform efforts. In 2011, Zambia was one of three countries to abstain from a call from the Human Rights Council to prepare a report on the rights of its LGBTQ citizens. In a 2012 UPR review, Zambia rejected recommendations to repeal laws criminalizing same-sex relations. This followed a similar recommendation by the UPR in its 2008 review. The Zambian delegation provided the following in defense of their rejections:

the Constitution making process will give the people the opportunity to determine whether specific rights for LGBTQ persons should be enshrined in the Constitution. The Government was determined not to prescribe to the Zambian people those rights that the Constitution should contain, but to let them make such a determination.

However, in its 2018 review, Zambia noted the recommendations to decriminalize same-sex relations. Aside from this, no further actions have been made thus far.

== Restrictions on advocacy ==
The Zambian government does not permit advocacy of LGBTQ rights; despite this, freedom of expression has been affirmed by the courts. Nevertheless, in their 2021 report, the bare conclusion of the U.S. Department of State was: "Freedom of expression or peaceful assembly on LGBTQI+ matters remained nonexistent."

In 1998, in a statement to the National Assembly of Zambia, Vice President Christon Tembo called for the arrest of individuals who promote gay rights, citing a need to "protect public morality". President Frederick Chiluba described homosexuality as "unbiblical" and "against human nature". Later, Home Affairs Minister Peter Machungwa ordered the arrest of any individual or group attempting to formally register a gay rights advocacy group. Herbert Nyendwa, the Registrar of Societies, stated that he would refuse to register any LGBTQ organisation or civic group.

=== The People v. Paul Kasonkomona ===
The restrictions on advocating for LGBTQ rights were challenged in Zambia's courts in 2013, after a human rights activist appeared on TV talk show program. During the program, the activist called for the decriminalization of homosexuality in Zambia, the recognition of rights for sexual minorities, and HIV's spread to be combated among sexual minority groups. After the program, the activist was stopped by police, held in jail overnight, and accused of inciting the public to take part in indecent activities. The activist was later charged with "idle and disorderly conduct under Section 178(g) of the Penal Code, of the Laws of Zambia".

The activist challenged the charges in court by questioning three definitions to which he was charged: (1) "soliciting", (2) "public space", and (3) "immoral purposes". In the first level of court, the Magistrate Court, the judge ruled in favour of the activist and stated the activist's statements reflected an act of freedom of expression. The government challenged the decision.

In the High Court, the judiciary ruled that the government could not prove that the activist's participation in the debate could not be considered "soliciting" as the activist's calls were not persistent and did not contain an element of pressure. The court agreed that the television program could be considered a "public place". The court did not agree with the government that the activist's statements were for "immoral purposes" as the activist was not encouraging people to engage in same-sex activities but to protect people from harm. Additionally, the High Court further ruled that the activist was reasonably exercising his right to freedom of expression.

== Recognition of same-sex relationships ==
Zambia does not recognize same-sex marriages or civil unions. Section 27(1)(c) of the Matrimonial Causes Act, 2007, states that a marriage is void if "the parties to the marriage are of the same sex."

The Anti-Gender-Based Violence Act, 2011, states that domestic relationship means "a relationship, between a victim and a respondent in any of the following ways(...)(b) the victim cohabits with the respondent in a relationship in the nature of a marriage notwithstanding that they are not married, were not married to each other or could not or cannot be married to each other." This definition may include people in a same-sex relationship.

In 2006, Home Affairs Minister Ronnie Shikapwasha stated that Zambia would never legalize same-sex marriage, claiming that it is a sin that goes against the country's Christian status. In February 2010, the National Constitutional Conference (NCC) unanimously agreed to adopt a clause that expressly forbids marriage between people of the same sex.

== Discrimination protections ==
There are no broad legal protections against discrimination based on sexual orientation or gender identity in areas such as education, health, housing and employment. However, some limited legal protections are in place:

- Section 5.1(c) of the Code of Ethics and Discipline: Fitness to practice, 2014, issued by the Health Professions Council of Zambia, states that "A health practitioner shall not: (x) Discriminate in the management of patients/clients based on the patient’s/client’s lifestyle, culture, beliefs, race, sex, sexuality, disability, age, ethnicity, social or economic status."
- Section 18.0.3(c) of the Information and Communication Technology Standards and Guidelines, issued by the Ministry of Health in 2014, states that "Making ethnic, sexual-preference or gender-related slurs or jokes" is considered by the Ministry as an inappropriate activity on the telephone network.
- The National Adolescent Sexual and Reproductive Health Policy, issued by the Ministry of Health in 2015, states that sexuality is a central aspect of being human throughout life and encompasses sex, gender identities and roles, sexual orientation, eroticism, pleasure, intimacy and reproduction.
- The Zambia Consolidated Guidelines for Treatment and Prevention of HIV Infection, issued by the Ministry of Health in 2022, states as a standard that: “The health facility provides high-quality services to all adolescents, regardless of age, sex, marital status, educational level, ethnic origin, sexual orientation, sexual behavior, or other characteristics.”
- Section 2.2.1.3 of the Standard Operating Procedures for Broadcasting, issued by the Independent Broadcasting Authority (IBA), states that "licensees must ensure that material which may cause offence is justified by the context. Such material may include, but is not limited to, offensive language, violence, sex, sexual violence, humiliation, distress, violation of human dignity, discriminatory treatment or language (for example on the grounds of age, disability, gender, race, religion, beliefs and sexual orientation)."

=== Constitutional provisions ===
As many East and Southern African former British colonies have done, Zambia enacted its own constitution in the 1990s. This overrides much of the pre-1964 criminal code, and there are very broad protections against discrimination, with much of the language lifted from the UN Charter on Human Rights.

23. [Protection from discrimination on the ground of race, etc.]

1. Subject to clauses (4), (5) and (7), no law shall make any provision that is discriminatory either of itself or in its effect.
2. Subject to clauses (6), (7) and (8), no person shall be treated in a discriminatory manner by any person acting by virtue of any written law or in the performance of the functions of any public office or any public authority.
3. In this Article the expression "discriminatory" mean, affording different treatment to different persons attributable, wholly or mainly to their respective descriptions by race, tribe, sex, place of origin, marital status, political opinions colour or creed whereby persons of one such description are subjected to disabilities or restrictions to which persons of another such description are not made subject or are accorded privileges or advantages which are not accorded to persons of another such description.

It can be argued that homosexuality is constitutionally protected under Article 23 of the 1996 Constitution. As constitutions override other laws, this may be why few, if any, prosecutions for homosexuality have taken place, as this would allow the relevant Criminal Code sections to be tested, and deleted if they are found to contravene the Constitution.

The Constitution of 1991, as amended by Act no. 17 of 1996, contains an anti-discrimination clause, present in Article 23 of the document. According to Article 23(1), "no law shall make any provision that is discriminatory either of itself or in its effect". Article 23(2) further prohibits discrimination "by any person acting by virtue of any written law or in the performance of the functions of any public office or any public authority", and Article 23(3) defines discrimination as extending to differential treatment of persons on the basis of "race, tribe, sex, place of origin, marital status, political opinions, color or creed". There is implicit but no explicit legal protection against discrimination based on sexual orientation and gender identity in the Zambian Constitution.

== Living conditions ==
The U.S. Department of State's 2010 Human Rights Report found that "the government enforced the law that criminalizes homosexual conduct and did not respond to societal discrimination" and that "societal violence against homosexual persons occurred, as did societal discrimination in employment, housing, and access to education or health care."

=== Community attitudes ===
Zambia's societal attitudes towards homosexuality strongly reflect the influences of evangelical religions and historical colonial attitudes to homosexuality. Arguably the largest recipient of fundamentalist evangelical missionaries during British colonial times, such fundamentalist-style religious adherence is widespread in Zambia.

In 1999, the non-governmental organisation Zambia Against People with Abnormal Sexual Acts (ZAPASA) formed to combat homosexuality and homosexuals in Zambia.

A 2010 survey revealed that only 2 percent of Zambians find homosexuality to be morally acceptable, nine points below the figure recorded in Uganda (11 percent acceptance). In 2013, Christine Kaseba, the wife of former President Michael Sata, said that "silence around issues of men who have sex with men should be stopped and no one should be discriminated against on the basis of their sexual orientation."

=== Harassment and violence ===
According to a report submitted to the United Nations Human Rights Committee by Global Rights and the International Gay and Lesbian Human Rights Commission, the criminalization of consensual homosexual sex in Zambia "has a devastating impact on same-sex practicing people in Zambia". The report asserts that LGBTQ people are subject to arbitrary arrest and detention, "discrimination in education, employment, housing, and access to services", and extortion–often with the knowledge or participation of law enforcement authorities. The U.S. Department of State's 2021 Human Rights Practices Report for Zambia concurs, stating:

Police perpetrated violence and verbal and physical harassment against persons based on gender identity and sexual orientation. LGBTQI+ persons were at risk of societal violence due to prevailing prejudices, misperceptions of the law, lack of legal protections, and inability to access healthcare services, and were subjected to prolonged detentions.

The report notes that LGBTQI+ advocacy groups advise that police regularly solicit bribes from arrested individuals for alleged same-sex activity.

The research and advocacy group Human Rights Watch reports the use of forced anal examinations for police prosecutions, despite such procedures having no evidentiary value as to same-sex activity. The examinations are widely condemned as invasive and traumatic. They are viewed as abusive treatment by the World Health Organisation and medical authorities. In reporting a specific 2014 prosecution, Amnesty International described the treatment of the two men in the case, who were subjected to forced anal examinations as "tantamount to torture and scientifically invalid".

LGBTQI+ individuals are at risk of harassment in the community from threats, stalking, vandalism and even violence. According to a report by Behind the Mask, a non-profit organisation dedicated to LGBTQ affairs in Africa, most LGBTQ people in Zambia are closeted due to fear of targeting and victimisation. Lesbians are especially vulnerable, according to the report, due to the patriarchal structure of Zambian society.

=== HIV/AIDS ===
As of July 2007, no public or private programmes provide HIV-related counselling to homosexual men in Zambia, where the HIV seroprevalence rate among adults is approximately 17 percent. Although men involved in same-sex sexual relationships have a higher risk of HIV transmission, the government-operated National AIDS Control Program does not address same-sex relationships.

In June 2007, the Zambian Ministry of Health agreed to conduct, together with the Centers for Disease Control and Prevention and Society for Family Health under Population Services International, an assessment to evaluate HIV and AIDS prevalence and transmission among gay men.

== Summary table ==
Same-sex sexual activity legal	No (Penalty: Imprisonment; from 14 years, up to possible life sentence)
Equal age of consent	No
Anti-discrimination laws in employment only	No
Anti-discrimination laws in the provision of goods and services	No
Anti-discrimination laws in all other areas (incl. indirect discrimination, hate speech)	No / Yes Limited protections based on Broadcasting and health
Recognition of same-sex couples	No
Step-child adoption by same-sex couples	No
Joint adoption by same-sex couples	No
Gays allowed to serve in the military	No
Right to change legal gender	No
Access to IVF for lesbians	No
Commercial surrogacy for gay male couples	No
MSMs allowed to donate blood	Yes There are no known bans or legal restrictions on blood donations from men who have sex with men

== See also ==
- Human rights in Zambia
- LGBTQ rights in Africa
- Bibliography of the history of Zambia § Gender and sexuality
