= The Splendid and the Vile =

2020 book by Erik Larson

- Cover of The Splendid and the Vile
- Author: Erik Larson
- Language: English
- Genre: History; nonfiction
- Publisher: Crown
- Publication date: February 25, 2020
- Publication place: United States
- Media type: Print, hardcover and paperback
- Pages: 608

The Splendid and the Vile is a biography of Winston Churchill during his first year as British Prime Minister, written by Erik Larson. In his first year as Prime Minister, Churchill was tested by the start of "The Blitz", a sustained bombing campaign against Great Britain by Adolph Hitler's air force, the Luftwaffe. Larson focuses on Mr. Churchill's experience with the actual words and stories of his family, friends, employees, political allies and enemies, as well as Britain's allies and enemies.

The Splendid and the Vile includes a detailed description of Great Britain's first years at war, and extends to the actions of United States during the period, especially Franklin Roosevelt's Lend-Lease program. The book concludes with the entrance of the U.S. into the war following Japan's surprise attack on Pearl Harbor.

Like other books by Erik Larson, The Splendid and the Vile is well-documented non-fiction, but it reads like a novel.
