= ZAMBART Project =

Zambart is a public health research non-governmental organization conducting scientific research into the dual epidemics of tuberculosis and HIV. The organization is based in Lusaka, Zambia at the University of Zambia's School of Medicine Ridgeway Campus. Zambart has over 200 employees and works in 16 study sites throughout the country.

== Overview ==
Zambart is a Zambian NGO formed in 2004 from a collaboration between the University of Zambia’s School of Medicine and the London School of Hygiene and Tropical Medicine that spans more than 20 years. From the initial studies of the impact of HIV on the clinical presentation and outcome of tuberculosis, the scope and partnership of the research have expanded widely. Based in Lusaka, Zambart now collaborates closely with government, non-governmental and academic institutions within Zambia, Africa and the rest of the world. Zambart staff form an interdisciplinary team with a range of expertise including epidemiology, clinical science, social science, laboratory, operations research, health systems and services research, health policy analysis, health economics, development communication and counselling.

Zambart focuses on the overlap between HIV and TB to improve the quality of life of people affected by the dual epidemic. Conducting research within a limited resource setting, Zambart is committed to bridging research and action through operational research and through forging effective collaboration with local stakeholders; providing evidence-based and high-quality research; addressing relevant scientific and priority questions; and capacity building for Zambian research - both scientific and managerial.

Internationally, Zambart is recognised as one of the foremost TB/HIV research groups in the world. Representatives sit on the World Health Organization (WHO) TB/HIV working group and have assisted in the writing of WHO technical guidelines and policy documents. In addition, Zambart is actively involved in regional and international research consortia through TARGETS, Evidence for Action and the Consortium to Respond Effectively to the AIDS/TB Epidemic (CREATE).

Zambart has no core funding but has been successful in attracting grants from a wide range of sources. Much of the current portfolio of activity is funded through the Department For International Development (DFID) Knowledge Programmes on Tuberculosis (TARGETS) and HIV (Evidence for Action) and the CREATE Consortium, funded by the Bill and Melinda Gates Foundation.
