= Glennon Doyle =

American author (born 1976)

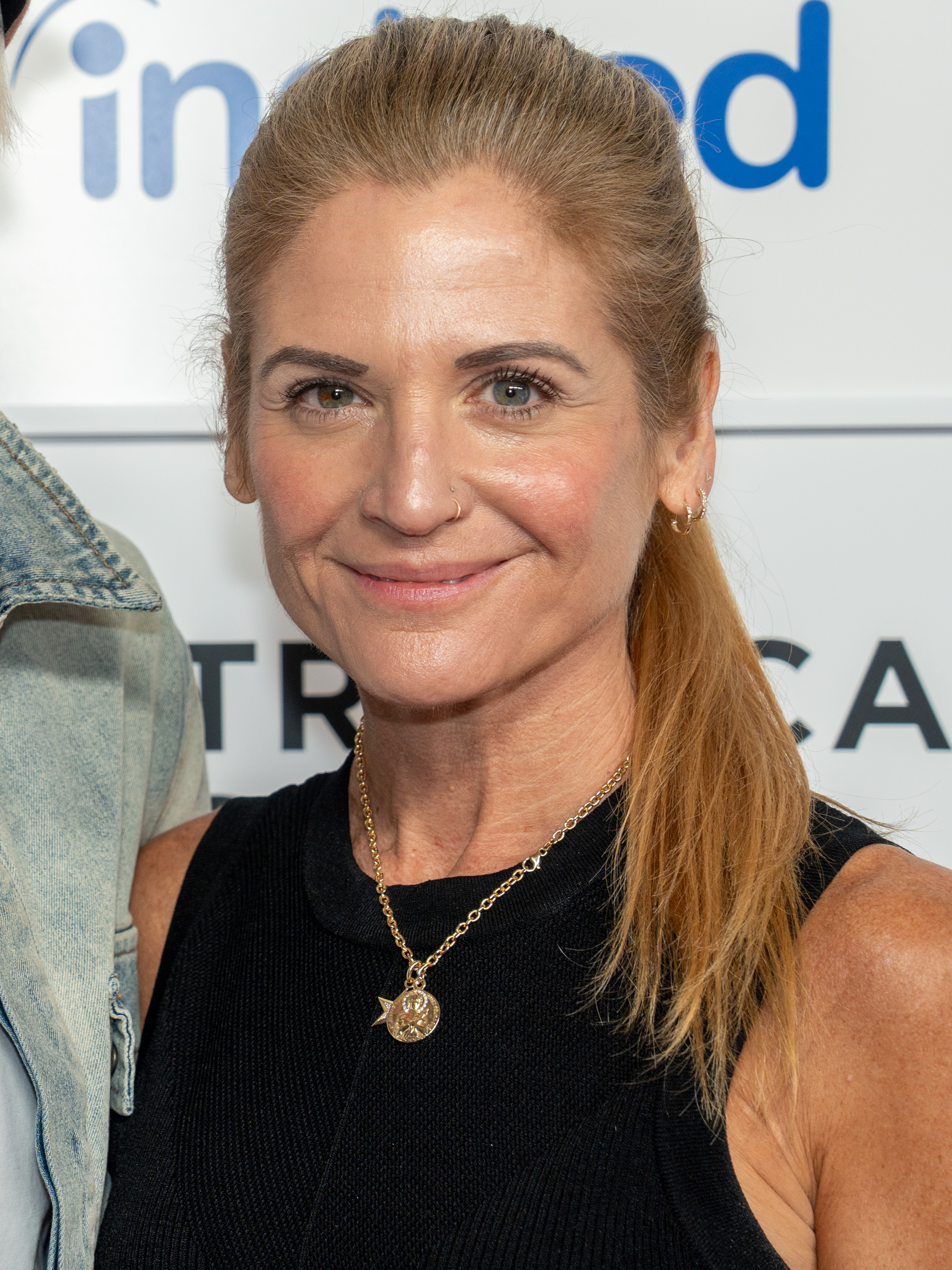
- Doyle in 2025
- Born: March 20, 1976 (age 50); Burke, Virginia, U.S.
- Other name: Glennon Doyle Melton
- Education: James Madison University (BA)
- Occupations: Author; public speaker
- Spouses: Craig Melton (div. 2016) Abby Wambach (m. 2017)
- Children: 3
- Relatives: Amanda Doyle (sister)
- Website: momastery.com

Glennon Doyle (born March 20, 1976) is an American author and queer activist known for her books Untamed, Love Warrior, We Can Do Hard Things and Carry On, Warrior. Doyle is also the creator of the online community Momastery, and is the founder and president of Together Rising, a women-led nonprofit organization supporting women, families, and children in crisis.

== Early life and education ==
Doyle was born in Burke, Virginia, and was raised with one sister, Amanda Doyle. She writes and speaks frequently about early struggles with bulimia and addiction. In her 2013 TEDx talk "Lessons from the Mental Hospital", she discusses time spent in a mental hospital when she was a teenager. She completed her Bachelor of Arts degree at James Madison University in 1999. Following graduation, she became a teacher in Northern Virginia.

== Career ==
In 2009, Doyle began writing online with her blog Momastery as a way to share "a look at her life as a progressive Christian raising three children." This was the start of her writing career and led to her first book, a memoir titled Carry On, Warrior, in 2013. This book unifies faith with themes of honesty and authenticity, but her subsequent writings shift further away from having a core religious focus.

In 2016, a follow-up memoir titled Love Warrior was released. In September 2016, it was selected to be a part of Oprah's Book Club 2.0.

A third memoir, Untamed, was published in 2020. In April 2020, the book was selected to be a part of Reese Witherspoon's Reese's Book Club (Hello Sunshine • Book Club). Untamed has sold millions of copies worldwide. A television series based on Untamed is being developed by J. J. Abrams's production company, with Sarah Paulson expected to be the lead. Sarah Paulson was the only actress to audition for the role, and Doyle said Paulson is the perfect actress to play her because she is "somebody who is a transformational actor, who is in touch with the world and involved in everything we care about, and who is queer".

In May 2021, Doyle launched a podcast titled We Can Do Hard Things. This podcast stars Doyle's wife, Abby Wambach, and sister, Amanda. It carries similar themes to Untamed. In 2025, the three published a book based on themes from the podcast titled We Can Do Hard Things: Answers to Life's 20 Questions.

Doyle has also made several appearances on the Together Live Tour, created by Jennifer Rudolph Walsh. The Together Live Tour is a storytelling event aimed at connecting communities and helping each other find purpose. Doyle has appeared on this tour alongside Latham Thomas, Connie Britton, and Sophia Bush.

== Awards and recognition ==
In 2014, Parents magazine named Doyle and Momastery the winner of its award for Best All-Around at Social Media. In 2021, Doyle was included in the Fast Company Queer 50 list. Doyle appears on Oprah's SuperSoul 100 list, and has been featured in O, The Oprah Magazine, The Atlantic, Newsweek, and Glamour. She has also appeared on multiple talk shows.

In 2024, Doyle's podcast We Can Do Hard Things won two Webby awards, one for Best Co-hosts (overall) and one for Best Individual Episode (Health, Wellness & Lifestyle) for Episode 165: Glennon’s Diagnosis & What’s Next.

== Philanthropy ==
Doyle founded Together Rising, a 501(c)(3) nonprofit organization, with an effective date of May 25, 2012. As of December 2020, Together Rising has raised over $25 million for people in need. Together Rising exists to "transform collective heartbreak into effective action." Most of Together Rising's funds are raised through time-limited crowd-sourced fund-raisers in which contributors are limited to giving a maximum of $25 to meet a particular need. This strategy is designed to build community, to enable people from all income groups to be able to donate ("democratize the giving"), and overcome indecision about how much to give.

== Published works ==
- Doyle, Glennon; Wambach, Abby; Doyle, Amanda (2025). We Can Do Hard Things: Answers to Life's 20 Questions. Dial Press. ISBN 978-0593977644.
- Doyle, Glennon (2020). Untamed. Dial Press. ISBN 978-1984801258.
- Doyle, Glennon (2016). Love Warrior. Flatiron Books. ISBN 978-1250075727.
- Doyle, Glennon (2013). Carry On, Warrior. Scribner. ISBN 978-1451697247.

== Personal life ==
Doyle was previously married to Craig Melton, and they share three children. In 2016, Doyle began a relationship with Abby Wambach, whom she met on a book tour. Doyle and Wambach married in 2017 and moved to Hermosa Beach, California, in 2021.

In 2020, Doyle became a co-owner of the Angel City Football Club in Los Angeles, California.

In September 2026, Doyle was arrested alongside over 100 protestors at a protest ahead of a speech by Israeli prime minister Benjamin Netanyahu at the United Nations General Assembly.
