= Delia Owens =

American author and zoologist (born 1949)

- Born: April 4, 1949 (age 77)
- Education: University of Georgia (BS); University of California, Davis (PhD)
- Occupations: Author; zoologist; conservationist
- Writing career
- Notable works: Cry of the Kalahari (1984); Where the Crawdads Sing (2018)
- Website: deliaowens.com

Delia Owens (born April 4, 1949) is an American author, zoologist, and conservationist. She is best known for her 2018 novel Where the Crawdads Sing.

Owens was born and grew up in southern Georgia, where she spent most of her life in or near true wilderness. She received a Bachelor of Science degree in zoology from the University of Georgia, and a PhD in animal behavior from the University of California, Davis.

Owens met Mark Owens in a protozoology class at the University of Georgia when they were both graduate students studying biology. They married in 1973, and in 1974 moved to southern Africa to study animals in the Kalahari Desert and Zambia. She wrote about Africa in her memoirs Cry of the Kalahari, The Eye of the Elephant, and Secrets of the Savanna. The couple were expelled from Botswana and are wanted for questioning in Zambia in relation to a murder investigation. They are no longer married. Since returning to the United States, Delia Owens has been involved in bear conservation.

Her debut novel, Where the Crawdads Sing, was released in 2018. It became one of the best-selling books of all time. It was adapted into a 2022 film of the same name.

== Biography ==
Owens grew up in Thomasville in southern Georgia; she has mostly lived in or near true wilderness. She and her then husband, Mark, were biology students at the University of Georgia; she received a Bachelor of Science in zoology there and a PhD in animal behavior from the University of California, Davis. She knew she wanted to be a writer, but she decided on a career in science.

The couple moved to Africa in 1974, travelling for some time before making camp in the Kalahari Desert, Botswana. Cry of the Kalahari was written about the couple's experience there. After they campaigned against the local cattle industry, Botswanan government officials expelled them from the country. The Owenses then settled in North Luangwa National Park, Zambia, and later in Mpika, Zambia in the early 1990s. Cry of the Kalahari and her two other non-fictional bestselling books, The Eye of the Elephant and Secrets of the Savanna, all concern the couple's research and conservation work. In Zambia they contributed to reducing the poaching of elephants, by helping poachers earn a living with skills such as beekeeping, carpentry, midwifery, and weaving.

Since completing her PhD in biology, Owens has published her studies of African wildlife behavioral ecology in journals including Nature, the Journal of Mammalogy, Animal Behaviour, and the African Journal of Ecology. She has contributed articles to Natural History and International Wildlife, where she was a "roving editor" for more than 20 years.

Delia and Mark Owens are divorced. For many years, Delia lived in Boundary County, Idaho which is twenty miles from Canada. However, in 2019–2020, she moved to a former horse farm near Asheville, North Carolina.

Owens is the co-founder of the Owens Foundation for Wildlife Conservation in Stone Mountain, Georgia. She has also worked as a roving editor for International Wildlife, lectured throughout North America and participated in conservation efforts for the grizzly bear throughout the United States.

In August 2018, Owens released her debut novel, Where the Crawdads Sing, which topped The New York Times Fiction Best Sellers of 2019 and The New York Times Fiction Best Sellers of 2020 for 32 non-consecutive weeks and was on the list for 135 weeks in total. In December 2018, it was announced that Fox 2000 Pictures had acquired the rights to the book and that Reese Witherspoon's production company Hello Sunshine would produce the film adaptation. The film was released in July 2022 and grossed $144.4 million.

=== Zambian shooting incident ===
On March 30, 1996, the ABC newsmagazine show Turning Point aired a documentary titled "Deadly Game: The Mark and Delia Owens Story", which included the filmed killing of an alleged poacher, executed while lying collapsed on the ground after having already been shot. The victim is not identified by the story's narrator, the journalist Meredith Vieira, nor is the identity of the person or persons who fired the fatal shots off-camera disclosed. The ABC script refers to the decedent as a "trespasser". The editor-in-chief of The Atlantic Jeffrey Goldberg subsequently interviewed Chris Everson, the ABC cameraman who filmed the killing of the alleged poacher. Everson told Goldberg that it was not a Zambian game scout but Christopher Owens who fired the fatal shots. Goldberg reported in an article called "The Hunted" in The New Yorker in 2010 that the Zambian police detective in charge of the subsequent investigation, Biemba Musole, had concluded that Mark Owens, with the help of his scouts, placed the victim's body in a cargo net, attached it to his helicopter, and then dropped it into a nearby lagoon. Musole led an effort to identify the alleged poacher, but did not succeed. The former Zambian national police commissioner, Graphael Musamba, told Goldberg that the investigation had been stymied by the absence of a body: "The bush is the perfect place to commit murder … The animals eat the evidence."

To this day, Delia Owens denies the incident, explaining that she was not involved and there was never a case. However, her novel Where the Crawdads Sing, has aroused suspicion from those on her book tour about the parallels between the main character Kya and her case, and Delia's own alleged accusation. The Owenses have denied the accusations.

No charges were brought against Owens or her ex-husband Mark, or stepson Christopher.

In June 2022, Zambian police officials told Jeffrey Goldberg that they believe that Delia Owens should be interrogated as a possible witness, co-conspirator, and accessory to felony crimes. Zambia's chief prosecutor Lillian Shawa-Siyuni told Goldberg that the investigation related to the killing of the alleged poacher, as well as other possible criminal activities in North Luangwa has been hampered by the lack of an extradition treaty between Zambia and the United States, and by ABC's apparent refusal to cooperate in the investigation, saying, "There is no statute of limitations on murder in Zambia...They are all wanted for questioning in this case, including Delia Owens."

== Awards and honors ==
- 1981 – Rolex Award for Enterprise for Kalahari Research Project (with former husband, Mark Owens)
- 1985 – John Burroughs Award (with Mark Owens)
- 1993 – University of California Outstanding Alumnus Award
- 1994 – Order of the Golden Ark (Netherlands)

== Published works ==
=== Novels ===
- Where the Crawdads Sing (2018)

=== Memoirs ===
- Cry of the Kalahari (1984)
- The Eye of the Elephant (1992)
- Secrets of the Savanna (2006)

== See also ==
- Ethology in fiction – animal behavior in fiction, as exemplified by the account in Where the Crawdads Sing
