= Corruption in Zambia =

Despite several steps taken by the previous government in order to fight corruption in Zambia, there has not been a dramatic improvement in the public perception of anti-corruption efforts over the past years. Corruption remains pervasive in the country, yet in April 2014 the Business Anti-Corruption Portal reported that the situation in Zambia is relatively better than that of other countries in the region.

In 2007, Zambia ratified the United Nations Convention Against Corruption, committing to address and tackle corruption on all levels. On Transparency International's 2007 Corruption Perceptions Index, the Corruption Perceptions Index for Zambia was 2.6 out of 10 on a scale from 0 ("high levels of perceived corruption") to 10 ("low levels of perceived corruption").

On the 2025 Corruption Perceptions Index, which used a different scoring methodology than its 2007 counterpart, Zambia scored 37 on a scale from 0 ("highly corrupt") to 100 ("very clean"). When ranked by score, Zambia ranked 99th among the 182 countries in the Index, where the country ranked first is perceived to have the most honest public sector. For comparison with regional scores, the best score among sub-Saharan African countries (Note: Angola, Benin, Botswana, Burkina Faso, Burundi, Cameroon, Cape Verde, Central African Republic, Chad, Comoros, Côte d'Ivoire, Democratic Republic of the Congo, Djibouti, Equatorial Guinea, Eritrea, Eswatini, Ethiopia, Gabon, Gambia, Ghana, Guinea, Guinea-Bissau, Kenya, Lesotho, Liberia, Madagascar, Malawi, Mali, Mauritania, Mauritius, Mozambique, Namibia, Niger, Nigeria, Republic of the Congo, Rwanda, Sao Tome and Principe, Senegal, Seychelles, Sierra Leone, Somalia, South Africa, South Sudan, Sudan, Tanzania, Togo, Uganda, Zambia, and Zimbabwe.) was 68, the average was 32 and the worst was 9. For comparison with worldwide scores, the best score was 89 (ranked 1), the average was 42, and the worst was 9 (ranked 181, in a two-way tie).

Unnecessarily long and complicated administrative procedures are common in Zambia's business environment, leading many companies to operate in the informal sector. The risk of widespread use of facilitation payments is also high due to the bureaucratic procedures for obtaining licences.

Political corruption is seen as the most prevalent, specifically bribery. According to the Global Corruption Barometer Africa 2019 survey by Transparency International, 18% of public service users have paid a bribe in the past twelve months.

Britain, Finland, Ireland and Sweden stopped their financial aid which was $34 million to Zambia due to corruption and financial mismanagement in 2018. A year later, Britain urged Zambia to take serious measures to fight corruption to get financial assistance.

== See also ==
- Crime in Zambia
