= Cry of the Kalahari =

1984 book by Mark and Delia Owens

- Author: Mark & Delia Owens
- Language: English
- Genre: Autobiography, Zoology, Wildlife
- Publisher: Robert Hartnoll Limited
- Publication date: 1984
- Media type: Hardcover, Paperback

Cry of the Kalahari (1984) is an autobiographical book detailing two young American zoologists, Mark and Delia Owens, and their experience studying wildlife in the Kalahari Desert in Botswana in the mid-1970s. There they lived and worked for seven years in an uninhabited area named Deception Valley in the Central Kalahari Game Reserve. With no roads and the nearest civilization eight hours away they had only each other and the animals they studied as company, most of which had never seen humans before. Their research focused mainly on lions, brown hyenas, jackals and other African carnivores. Cry of the Kalahari is the personal story of the Owenses' encounters with these and a myriad of other animals and depicts their own struggle to live and work in such an inhospitable and unforgiving environment.

Cry of the Kalahari was a national and international bestseller, translated into seven languages and is the 1985 John Burroughs Medal winner.
