= Muvi TV =

Zambian Private television station

- Country: Zambia
- Broadcast area: Zambia
- Headquarters: Muvi TV Studio Lusaka, Zambia

Programming
- Languages: English; Bemba; Nyanja; Tumbuka; Si-Lozi; Kaonde

History
- Launched: 1 July 2000; 25 years ago

Links
- Website: muvitv.com

Muvi TV is a private television station in Lusaka, Zambia. It was formed in 2003 and is one of the 4 major private stations in Zambia. It has faced major government shutdowns in the past due to its reporting of critical issues.

In 2011, president Rupiah Banda ordered the closure of the station just before the general elections.
