= Save Me (British TV series) =

British television drama series

- Also known as: Save Me Too (series 2)
- Genre: Drama; Crime thriller
- Created by: Lennie James
- Written by: Lennie James; Daniel Fajemisin-Duncan; Marlon Smith
- Starring: Lennie James; Suranne Jones; Stephen Graham; Jason Flemyng; Adrian Edmondson; Lesley Manville
- Composers: Dustin O'Halloran; Bryan Senti
- Country of origin: United Kingdom
- Original language: English
- No. of seasons: 2
- No. of episodes: 12

Production
- Executive producers: Simon Heath; Jessica Sykes
- Producer: Patrick Schweitzer
- Cinematography: Chas Bain
- Editor: Meredith Leece
- Running time: 46–51 minutes
- Production company: World Productions

Original release
- Network: Sky Atlantic
- Release: 28 February 2018 – 6 May 2020

Save Me is a British drama television series, created by, written, and starring Lennie James. The first series premiered on 28 February 2018 on Sky Atlantic. In March 2018, it was renewed for a second series, titled Save Me Too, which premiered on 1 April 2020.

== Premise ==
Nelson "Nelly" Rowe is a down-and-out man whose life is turned upside down when Jody, the estranged daughter he fathered thirteen years ago, mysteriously disappears. He begins a determined quest to get to the bottom of things and find his daughter – lying, begging for favours and stretching his friendships to the limit in the process.

== Cast and characters ==
=== Main ===
- Lennie James as Nelson "Nelly" Rowe, a down-and-out, sofa-surfing womaniser
- Suranne Jones as Claire McGory, Nelly's former lover and mother of Jody
- Stephen Graham as Fabio "Melon" Melonzola, Nelly's best friend, a computer expert and convicted sex offender
- Jason Flemyng as Tam, a friend of Nelly's, a cross-dresser and strip club bartender
- Adrian Edmondson as Gideon Charles, a major figure in the paedophile ring
- Lesley Manville as Jennifer Charles (series 2), the wife of Gideon

=== Recurring ===
- Susan Lynch as Stace, a childhood friend of Nelly's and landlady of The Palm Tree, his local pub
- Kerry Godliman as Martine "Teens" Betts, Nelly's girlfriend at the start of the series, whom he remains friends with afterwards
- Olive Gray as Grace, a trafficked teen whom Nelly saves and who resembles his missing daughter
- Nadine Marshall as Detective Sergeant Shola O'Halloran, DCI Thorpe's deputy
- Barry Ward as Barry McGory, Claire's husband and Jody's adoptive father, an apparently wealthy club owner
- Alan McKenna as Detective Chief Inspector Ian Thorpe, senior investigating officer into Jody's disappearance
- Indeyarna Donaldson-Holness as Jody McGory, Nelly and Claire's thirteen-year-old daughter and Barry's adopted daughter
- Phil Dunster as BJ McGory, Barry's son and Claire's stepson
- Thomas Coombes as Goz, a drug dealer and friend of Nelly's
- Alice Feetham as Bernie Melonzola, Melon's wife, whom he was convicted of having sex with when she was fifteen
- Camilla Beeput as Zita, Nelly's occasional girlfriend, a stripper
- Nicholas Croucher as Dylan, Jody's best friend and next-door neighbour
- Struan Rodger as Richard, owner of an illicit paedophile bar and brothel
- Ryan McKen as DC Leo Rainsford, a detective working on Jody's case
- Alexander Arnold as Luke, a student and regular at The Palm Tree
- Ragevan Vasan as Gavin, a student and regular at The Palm Tree, Luke's friend and flatmate
- Remmie Milner as Daisy, Goz's girlfriend and mother of his child
- Jimmy Walker as Marky Betts, Teens' son, a strip club doorman
- Mia Austen as PC Helen Long, the McGorys' family liaison officer

== Episodes ==
| Series | Episodes | Originally released | |
| Series | Episodes | First released | Last released |
|---|---|---|---|
| 1 | 6 | 28 February 2018 | 4 April 2018 |
| 2 | 6 | 1 April 2020 | 6 May 2020 |

=== Series 1 (2018) ===
Airdates listed as per the Sky Atlantic broadcast. All episodes of this series were available to download from Sky Box Sets and Now TV from 28 February 2018.

| No. | Title | Directed by | Written by | Original release date |
|---|---|---|---|---|
| 1 | "Episode 1" | Nick Murphy | Lennie James | 28 February 2018 |
Nelson "Nelly" Rowe, a self-styled womaniser, has his life is turned upside down when the police suddenly burst into his flat and arrest him on suspicion of kidnapping. Nelly discovers that his supposed victim is his estranged thirteen-year-old daughter Jody, whom he has not seen in ten years. After attempting to convince the police of his innocence, Nelly decides to take matters into his own hands and track Jody down himself. Later that night, Nelly is attacked after his girlfriend's son discovers he has been cheating on her with a number of other women.
| 2 | "Episode 2" | Nick Murphy | Lennie James | 7 March 2018 |
Tam helps Nelly get back on his feet. Barry makes a surprising reward offer at a press conference, leading Claire to suspect his motives. When Melon disappears after being arrested, Nelly suspects he may be involved in Jody's disappearance and with the help of Goz, decides to track him down. Nelly also approaches Jody's best friend, Dylan, whom he suspects may know more about what happened on the night she disappeared.
| 3 | "Episode 3" | Nick Murphy | Lennie James | 14 March 2018 |
Nelly confronts Melon and questions him over Jody's disappearance. Thorpe and O'Halloran reveal to Claire and Barry that the police received a distress call from Jody over two weeks ago, the day after she went missing. Claire helps out with a press drive organised by Stace.
| 4 | "Episode 4" | Nick Murphy | Daniel Fajemisin-Duncan and Marlon Smith | 21 March 2018 |
After the police reveal a possible location from where the distress call was made, Nelly decides to go door-to-door in an attempt to find the house where Jody is being held, and finds an abandoned house which is partially boarded up. Later that night, he and Claire decide to investigate. They break into the house, only to find Jody's bloodstained jumper. Meanwhile, Zita discloses a possible lead in the form of a local brothel, run by a paedophile kingpin. With Melon's help, Nelly trawls the darkweb and finds a videoclip of another girl being abused in the room where Jody was being held.
| 5 | "Episode 5" | Nick Murphy | Lennie James | 28 March 2018 |
Nelly begs Melon to help him get close to brothel owner Richard, in the hope that he will lead him to Jody. Melon learns that a young girl answering Jody's description is to be sold through an auction at the brothel in just five days time. Nelly begs Claire to stump up £15,000 to allow him access to the auction. Meanwhile, Goz discovers a semi-naked picture of Jody in Gavin's room, and just hours later, Gavin takes his own life. Nelly suspects Gavin of being involved in Jody's disappearance, until Luke slips up and reveals a vital clue which points towards him being involved.
| 6 | "Episode 6" | Nick Murphy | Lennie James | 4 April 2018 |
Nelly stages a lock-in and confronts Luke over his involvement in Jody's disappearance. Claire manages to find £12,000 which Nelly takes along to the auction, but he soon realises that he is out of his depth. Claire resorts to drastic measures in an attempt to get Luke to talk.

=== Series 2 (2020) ===
Airdates listed as per the Sky Atlantic broadcast. All episodes of this series were available to download from Sky Box Sets and Now TV from 1 April 2020.

| No. | Title | Directed by | Written by | Original release date |
|---|---|---|---|---|
| 1 | "Episode 1" | Jim Loach | Lennie James | 1 April 2020 |
| 2 | "Episode 2" | Jim Loach | Daniel Fajemisin-Duncan & Marlon Smith | 8 April 2020 |
| 3 | "Episode 3" | Jim Loach | Emer Kenny | 15 April 2020 |
| 4 | "Episode 4" | Coky Giedroyc | Lennie James | 22 April 2020 |
| 5 | "Episode 5" | Coky Giedroyc | Lennie James | 29 April 2020 |
| 6 | "Episode 6" | Coky Giedroyc | Lennie James | 6 May 2020 |

== Production ==
The series was green-lit in January 2017, under the original working title of Gone. James reunited with World Productions for the series, with whom he previously worked on the first series of Line of Duty.

In March 2018, it was renewed for a second series under the title Save Me Too.

== Broadcast ==
The first series premiered on 28 February 2018 on Sky Atlantic. The second series premiered on 1 April 2020.

Sky Vision distributed the first series worldwide, but the distribution rights for the second series were picked up by Sky's sister company NBCUniversal. A DVD of the first series was released via Acorn Media on 7 May 2018.

== Reception ==
On review aggregator Rotten Tomatoes, 100% of 16 critics gave the first season a positive review, with an average rating of 8.3/10. The website's critics consensus reads, "Save Me will rescue viewers' evening with outstanding performances and an absorbing mystery that never ceases to dazzle with its revelations." For the second season, 100% of 15 critics reviewed it positively, with an average rating of 8.8/10. The website's critics consensus reads, "Save Me's second season overcomes the shortcomings of its first, deepening its characters and even finding a little levity in its harrowing tale.

The premiere episode received 1.42 million viewers.

== Awards ==
Save Me Too won the 2021 BAFTA TV Award for Best Drama Series.
