= Marissa Stapley =

Canadian author

- Born: 20 November 1978 (age 47) Stouffville, Ontario, Canada
- Occupation: Journalist and novelist
- Education: Ryerson University (2003)
- Notable works: Lucky (2021)

Website
- marissastapley.com

Marissa Stapley (born 1978) is a Canadian author and journalist. She is best known for her novel Lucky (2021).

== Early life and education ==
Stapley was born 20 November 1978, in Stouffville, Ontario. She graduated from Stouffville District Secondary School, before receiving a degree in journalism from Ryerson University in 2003. Her grandfather and grandmother were both journalists.

== Career ==
Stapley began her career as a journalist. Her reporting appeared in publications across North America including Elle, Reader's Digest, and The Globe and Mail. She taught creative writing and editing at the University of Toronto and Centennial College.

Stapley has written five novels individually under her name: Mating for Life (2014), Things to Do When It's Raining (2018), The Last Resort (2019), Lucky (2021), and The Lightning Bottles (2024). She also co-wrote Three Holidays and a Wedding (2023) with Canadian writer Uzma Jalaluddin. Under the pen name Maggie Knox, Stapley and author Karma Brown co-wrote the holiday novels The Holiday Swap (2021) and All I Want for Christmas (2022). Under the pen name Julia McKay, Stapley wrote the holiday romance novels The Holiday Honeymoon Switch (2024) and Christmas at the Ranch (2025).

Lucky was a New York Times bestseller. Stapley has written about how the death of her mother, Valerie, influenced her work, including the novel Lucky, which Stapley dedicated to her. The novel was selected as the December 2021 pick for Reese's Book Club, the first Canadian novel chosen for the Club. A sequel to Stapley's Lucky book, titled No Such Thing as Lucky, is scheduled for publication in 2027.

The television rights to Lucky were optioned by ABC Disney Studios, with Carlton Cuse attached as producer and Stapley developing the pilot treatment with him. The project moved to Apple TV+ as a seven-episode limited series, with a premier date of July 15, 2026. It was created and co-showrun by Jonathan Tropper, with Cassie Pappas as his co-showrunner. Reese Witherspoon executive produced the series through Hello Sunshine.

Lucky features Anya Taylor-Joy as Lucky, Drew Starkey as Cary, Annette Bening as Priscilla, Timothy Olyphant as Lucky's father John, and Aunjanue Ellis-Taylor as FBI Agent Billie Rand.

== Personal life ==
Stapley lives in Toronto with her family.

== Bibliography ==
As Marissa Stapley

- Mating for Life (2014)
- Things to Do When It's Raining (2018)
- The Last Resort (2019)
- Lucky (2021)
- The Lightning Bottles (2024)
- No Such Thing as Lucky (forthcoming, 2027)

With Uzma Jalaluddin

- Three Holidays and a Wedding (2023)

As Maggie Knox (with Karma Brown)

- The Holiday Swap (2021)
- All I Want for Christmas (2022)

As Julia McKay

- The Holiday Honeymoon Switch (2024)
- Christmas at the Ranch (2025)
