= Remmie Milner =

British actress

- Occupation: Actress
- Known for: Shirley Campbell in Silo; Daisy in Save Me

Remmie Milner is a British actress. She is known for playing Shirley Campbell in Silo and Daisy in Save Me.

== Career ==
Milner played the title role in the 2013 stage production Melody Loses Her Mojo. In 2020, she appeared with Gemma Lawrence in Sunnymead Court.

Her television roles include Daisy in Save Me, Lena Feldt in His Dark Materials, and Shirley Campbell in Silo.

== Personal life ==
Her partner's name is Peter Costello. They have two children.
