= Silo (TV series) =

2023 American science fiction television series

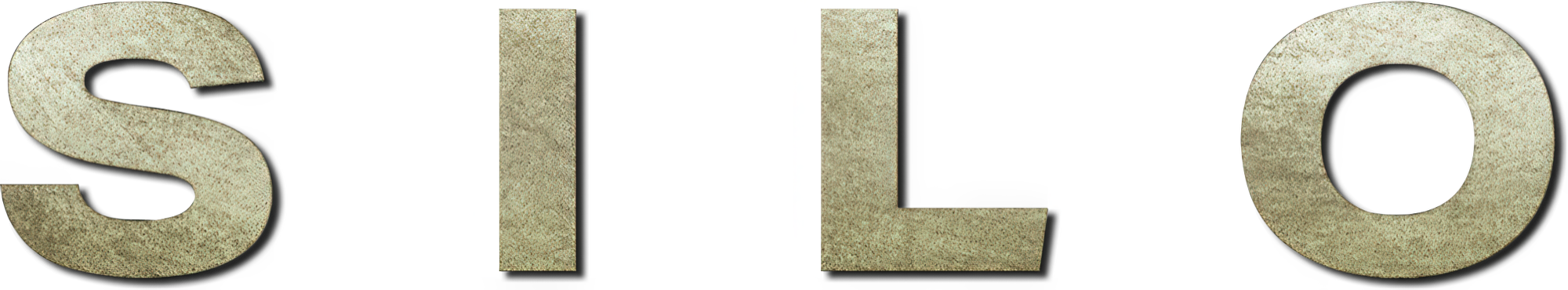
- Genre: Drama; Dystopian; Science fiction
- Created by: Graham Yost
- Based on: Silo series by Hugh Howey
- Showrunner: Graham Yost
- Starring: Rebecca Ferguson; Rashida Jones; David Oyelowo; Common; Tim Robbins; Harriet Walter; Avi Nash; Rick Gomez; Chinaza Uche; Shane McRae; Remmie Milner; Alexandria Riley; Clare Perkins; Billy Postlethwaite; Steve Zahn; Ashley Zukerman; Jessica Henwick; Reed Birney; Laura Innes; Jessica Brown Findlay; Morven Christie; Matt Craven
- Composer: Atli Örvarsson
- Country of origin: United States
- Original language: English
- No. of seasons: 3
- No. of episodes: 30

Production
- Executive producers: Graham Yost; Morten Tyldum; Rebecca Ferguson; Nina Jack; Hugh Howey; Fred Golan; Remi Aubuchon; Ingrid Escajeda; Joanna Thapa; Michael Dinner; Amber Templemore
- Producers: Cassie Pappas; Jessica Blaire; Aric Avelino; Ben Brafman; Katherine DiSavino
- Production location: United Kingdom
- Cinematography: Mark Patten; David Luther; Laurie Rose; Baz Irvine
- Editors: Hazel Baillie; Christian Sandino Taylor; Keith Henderson; Jean Crupper; Harvey Rosenstock
- Running time: 41–62 minutes
- Production companies: Mímir Films; Nemo Films; AMC Studios; Apple Studios (season 2)

Original release
- Network: Apple TV+
- Release: May 5, 2023 – January 17, 2025
- Network: Apple TV
- Release: July 3, 2026 – present

Silo is an American science fiction dystopian drama television series created by Graham Yost, based on the Silo trilogy of novels (Wool, Shift, and Dust) by author Hugh Howey. Set in a dystopian future where a community exists in a giant underground silo comprising 144 levels, it stars Rebecca Ferguson as Juliette Nichols, an engineer who becomes embroiled in the mysteries of its past and present. Rashida Jones, David Oyelowo, Common, Tim Robbins, Harriet Walter, Avi Nash, Rick Gomez, Chinaza Uche, Shane McRae, Remmie Milner, Alexandria Riley, Clare Perkins, Billy Postlethwaite, Steve Zahn, Ashley Zukerman, Jessica Henwick, Reed Birney, Laura Innes, Jessica Brown Findlay, Morven Christie, and Matt Craven also star.

Development of a film adaptation of Wool began in 2012. By the end of the decade, the project was shelved, and was picked up as a series by Apple TV+ in May 2021. Principal photography began in August 2021 and the ten-episode first season premiered on May 5, 2023. The second season premiered on November 15, 2024. The third season premiered on July 3, 2026. All three seasons received positive reviews from critics, particularly for the world-building, production design, and Ferguson's performance. In December 2024, the series was renewed for a fourth and final season, which is set to premiere on July 9, 2027.

== Premise ==
In a dystopian future where a community exists in a giant silo extending 144 levels underground, 10,000 people live in a society bound by regulations they believe are meant to protect them.

== Cast and characters ==
=== Main ===
- Rebecca Ferguson as Juliette Nichols, an engineer who works on the generators in the lowest levels of the Silo
  - Amelie Child-Villiers portrays a young Juliette
- Rashida Jones (Note: Jones appears in only one episode although credited with the main cast.) as Allison Becker (season 1), a woman who works in the IT Department in the Silo and is married to Holston. During their attempts to conceive a child, she becomes suspicious of the Silo's true history and how it is governed
- David Oyelowo (Note: Oyelowo is credited with the main cast in episodes 1 and 2, and is credited as a 'special guest star' in all subsequent appearances.) as Holston Becker (season 1), the devoted husband of Allison and the sheriff of the Silo
- Common as Robert Sims, the head of security for Judicial, who maintains order within the Silo
- Tim Robbins as Bernard Holland (seasons 1–3), the strict head of the IT Department in the Silo
- Harriet Walter as Martha Walker, an electrical engineer with severe agoraphobia who runs a workshop in the lower levels of the Silo and acts as a parental figure to Juliette
- Avi Nash as Lukas Kyle, a systems analyst in the IT Department who is curious about the world outside the Silo
- Rick Gomez as Patrick Kennedy, a maintenance worker and former smuggler of "relics", objects from the world before the Silo
- Chinaza Uche as Paul Billings, the newly assigned chief deputy and a former Judicial administrator who is afflicted with the "Syndrome", a medical condition that causes tremors
- Shane McRae as Deagan Knox (season 2–present; recurring season 1), the head of the Mechanical level in the Silo and Juliette's boss
  - Charlie Coombes portrays a young Knox
- Remmie Milner as Shirley Campbell (season 2–present; recurring season 1), an engineer in Mechanical who is Juliette's closest friend and colleague
  - Ida Brooke portrays a young Shirley
- Alexandria Riley as Camille Sims (season 2–present; guest season 1), Robert's wife, the mother of their son, and a former raider
- Clare Perkins as Carla McLain (season 2–present; guest season 1), Walker's ex-wife and the head of the supply department
- Billy Postlethwaite as Hank Murphy (season 2–present; recurring season 1), a deputy who works in the lower levels
- Steve Zahn (Note: Zahn remained uncredited until the episode "The Harmonium".) as Jimmy Conroy / "Solo" (season 2; guest season 3), the only living survivor of the rebellion in Silo 17
  - Cameron Bell portrays a young Jimmy
- Ashley Zukerman as Daniel Keene / Troy (season 3–present; guest season 2), a United States congressman during the time before the Silos were created
- Jessica Henwick as Helen Drew (season 3–present; guest season 2), an inquisitive journalist based in Washington, D.C.
- Reed Birney as Henry (season 3–present), a mysterious operative encountered by Daniel and Helen
- Laura Innes as Rosalind Thurman (season 3–present), a United States senator overseeing the congressional response to conflict with Iran
- Jessica Brown Findlay as Charlotte "Charles" Keene (season 3–present), Daniel's sister and a United States military pilot
- Morven Christie as Anna (season 3–present), Rosalind's daughter and a congressional aide
- Matt Craven as Victor Crnkovich (season 3), a doctor pioneering the use of a memory-altering drug

=== Recurring ===
- Will Patton as Samuel "Sam" Marnes (season 1), a deputy who works under Sheriff Holston and closely with Mayor Jahns
- Ferdinand Kingsley as George Wilkins (season 1; guest season 3), a computer geek who runs a repair shop. He seeks out Allison for her help to uncover the secrets of the Silo
- Chipo Chung as Sandy, a clerical worker in the sheriff's department
- Matt Gomez Hidaka as Terry Cooper (season 1; guest season 2), a rookie engineer in the lower levels and Juliette's shadow
- Olatunji Ayofe as Teddy, a worker in Mechanical and one of Juliette's colleagues
- Iain Glen as Dr. Pete Nichols (seasons 1–2), an obstetrician and the father of Juliette, from whom he has been estranged since she was a teenager
- Angela Yeoh as Molly Karins, a deputy who works in the mid-levels
- Tanya Moodie as Judge Mary Meadows (seasons 1–2), the head of Judicial who enforces the Pact, a list of rules that all Silo residents must follow
- Caitlin Zoz as Kathleen Billings, Paul's wife and the mother of their daughter
- Akie Kotabe as Diego, a Watcher monitoring the Silo
- Christian Ochoa as Rick Amundsen (season 2; guest season 1), a high-ranking raider, a group of armed enforcers working for Sims
- Sonita Henry as Regina Jackson (season 3; guest season 1), a former relic dealer and lover of George
- Will Merrick as Danny (season 3; guest season 1), a criminal hacker who disrupts the IT Department's security network
- George Robinson as Mark Chambers (season 3; guest season 2), the overseer of a manufacturing workshop
- Ned Dennehy as Ed Harwood (season 3), the head of the mining level
- Colin Hanks as Per Stensen (season 3), the world's wealthiest person who funds construction of the Silos

=== Guest ===
- Geraldine James as Ruth Jahns (season 1), the elected mayor of the Silo
- Sophie Thompson as Gloria Hildebrandt (seasons 1 and 3), a paranoid woman who became the Silo's fertility counselor after failing to conceive a child herself
- Sienna Guillory as Hanna Nichols (season 1), a surgeon and the deceased mother of Juliette
- Henry Garrett as Douglas Trumbull (season 1), an enforcer for Judicial who is loyal to Sims
- Ross McCall as the Silo 17 Sheriff (seasons 2–3), the leader of the rebellion in Silo 17
- Nick Haverson as Russell Conroy (season 2), the head of the IT Department in Silo 17 and Solo's father
- Imogen Butler-Cole as Gwen Conroy (season 2), Solo's mother
- Pippa Winslow as Gladys (season 2), a worker in Mechanical during Juliette's childhood
- Sacharissa Claxton as Frances Boyer (season 2), Patrick's niece
- Georgina Sadler as Audrey (seasons 2–3), the leader of a group of young orphaned survivors in Silo 17
- Orlando Norman as Rick (seasons 2–3), Audrey's boyfriend and the father of their two children
- Sara Hazemi as Hope / "Eater" (seasons 2–3), the outcast of Audrey's group
- Stuart Milligan as Terrance Penbrook (season 2), a descendant of Salvador Quinn, the former head of IT over 140 years prior
- Lolita Chakrabarti as Lukas' mother (season 2)
- Quelin Sepulveda as Orla Kent (season 3), the acting head of the supply department
- Chris Fulton as Mike (season 3), a worker in the supply department and Orla's boyfriend
- Gemma Acosta as Glenda Harwood (season 3), Ed's daughter and McLain's former shadow
- William Hope as Gus (season 3), Knox's father
- Peter Gabriel as himself (season 3)
- Shane Taylor as Joel (season 3)

== Episodes ==
Season	Episodes	Originally released		
Season	Episodes	First released	Last released	Network
1	10	May 5, 2023	June 30, 2023	Apple TV+
2	10	November 15, 2024	January 17, 2025	Apple TV+
3	10	July 3, 2026	September 4, 2026	Apple TV
4	10	July 9, 2027	TBA	Apple TV

=== Season 1 (2023) ===
No. overall	No. in season	Title	Directed by	Written by	Original release date
1	1	"Freedom Day"	Morten Tyldum	Graham Yost	May 5, 2023
In a massive underground bunker called the "Silo", a community thrives without knowing their history, as records were supposedly destroyed 140 years earlier during a failed rebellion. Sheriff Holston Becker tells Deputy Sam Marnes that he wants to "go out". Three years earlier, Holston and his wife Allison receive permission for her doctor to remove her birth control implant for 365 days. During this time Allison learns subversive beliefs about the Silo from fertility expert Gloria Hildebrandt, and helps IT expert George Wilkins explore a forbidden hard drive dating from before the rebellion. Allison tells a skeptical Holston that those in power are lying to them, and that the view on the Silo's screens of a dead outside world is fake; as evidence she shows him the implant that the doctor only pretended to remove from her abdomen. Allison publicly declares her desire to "go out", which according to 'The Pact', a book of the Silo's rules, must be fulfilled. Allison promises to clean the Silo's external camera if the outside is beautiful. She is dressed in an environmental suit and goes outside; on the screens the Silo residents watch her clean the camera and collapse, dead. Two years later, Holston investigates George's death and meets Juliette Nichols, an engineer who claims he was murdered.
2	2	"Holston's Pick"	Morten Tyldum	Jessica Blaire & Cassie Pappas	May 5, 2023
Holston learns from Juliette that George, her lover, collected forbidden historical relics. Upon learning that George and Allison worked together, Holston agrees to investigate and promises to send Juliette a signal when he finds something. A few months later, Holston leaves the Silo and is shocked to see that the outside is lush and beautiful like Allison claimed. He cleans the camera, takes off his helmet, and on camera appears to crawl to Allison's body before dying. Mayor Ruth Jahns learns that Holston left behind a statement nominating Juliette to be his replacement as sheriff. Juliette knows that George was looking for a door and tries to retrace his steps in the watery dig space underneath the Silo.
3	3	"Machines"	Morten Tyldum	Ingrid Escajeda	May 12, 2023
Mayor Jahns and Deputy Marnes descend 144 levels to meet Juliette. Along the way, Jahns meets Juliette's estranged father, Dr. Pete Nichols and Juliette's engineer friend, Martha Walker, for opinions about Juliette's character. Despite the disapproval of Judge Meadows, head of Judicial, and Bernard Holland, head of IT, Jahns offers Juliette the role of sheriff. Juliette declines but changes her mind when she's given Holston's badge, which has the word "TRUTH" carved on the back. Juliette requests that Jahns allow the main generator to be switched off for repairs, which has never been done. At shutdown, the Silo's screens briefly show a healthy green view of the outside, which startles a few people, though others don't appear to notice. With difficulty, the Mechanical team fixes the main generator. Before leaving for her new job, Juliette asks Walker to study a camcorder she found among George's relics. Marnes and Jahns confess their love for each other, before Jahns collapses with blood in her mouth.
4	4	"Truth"	David Semel	Remi Aubuchon	May 19, 2023
Ruth Jahns is dead; Marnes believes she was poisoned, and that he was the real target because they drank from each other's water flasks. Bernard, as Mayor Pro Tem, swears Juliette in as the new sheriff. Juliette asks Marnes to help her investigate George's death, in return for her helping him investigate Jahns's death. Robert Sims, of Judicial, tells Marnes that Judge Meadows is ready to remove Juliette as sheriff but Marnes tells him to let Juliette quit on her own. Later, Marnes is attacked in his apartment. Juliette meets Lukas, a resident who spends late nights in the cafeteria. Juliette finds Holston's file on George but cannot find George's hard drive that Holston confiscated. In a flashback, Juliette leaves home at thirteen after the deaths of her mother, Hanna and younger brother, Jacob.
5	5	"The Janitor's Boy"	David Semel	Graham Yost	May 26, 2023
Sam Marnes is found dead. Paul Billings, Judicial's original choice for sheriff, is made Juliette's chief deputy. Sandy, who works in the sheriff's office, tells Juliette to find Marnes's killer before Judicial picks a scapegoat. Juliette discovers that Doug Trumbull, who works for Judicial, planted evidence to frame resident Patrick Kennedy for Marnes's murder. Sims tells Doug that his father was supposedly a janitor but actually had a secret job that was crucial to the Silo's survival. Sims kills Doug before he can be arrested, and Doug is posthumously blamed for Marnes and Jahns's murders. Juliette learns that Lukas has been studying the cafeteria's display screens at night to observe the movement of the "lights" in the sky, Silo residents being ignorant that these are stars. Walker shows Juliette that the camcorder's technology is more advanced than what is permitted in the Silo. Juliette retrieves one of George's relics in the hopes of reopening the investigation into his death.
6	6	"The Relic"	Bert & Bertie	Aric Avelino	June 2, 2023
Juliette arranges for the relic to be found in Doug's apartment and uses it as an excuse to track down supposed relic dealer Regina Jackson, who turns out to be George's previous lover who bought relics for him. Sims learns about George's connection to the relic and formally confronts Juliette; Bernard accepts Juliette's claim that she didn't plant the relic but he orders her to stop investigating Doug's motives for murdering Jahns and Marnes. Juliette and Billings argue over her difficulty in trusting him and she reveals that she knows he has the ‘Syndrome’, a medical condition that should disqualify him from being a deputy. Regina tells Juliette that she did not report George's hard drive to Judicial but she did tell "the man who knows everything" about it, after he threatened her loved ones. Regina gives Juliette a cherished relic she received from George: an old children's travel book. While Juliette browses the book, she is watched in her apartment by a surveillance team that has cameras all over the Silo, with equipment much more advanced than the rest of the Silo.
7	7	"The Flamekeepers"	Bert & Bertie	Jessica Blaire	June 9, 2023
Sims is part of the surveillance team and monitors Juliette's movements using the cameras. Juliette seeks out Gloria, who is being drugged on Meadows's order. Despite Juliette's offer to resign as sheriff, Meadows says she cannot lift the order. Billings confronts Juliette when she neglects her duties; she tells him about her investigation into George's murder and he decides to cover for her. Lukas tries to kiss Juliette but she rebuffs him. Bernard tells Juliette that he fears Meadows will move against them and encourages her to find a way to control Meadows. With her father's help, Juliette is able to question Gloria and learns that she is part of the Flamekeepers, a secret group dedicated to preserving the past, whose members are being systematically killed. Juliette's mother befriended Flamekeepers but Juliette's father obeyed orders to prevent them from having children. Juliette realizes that surveillance cameras are behind the wall mirrors and retrieves George's hard drive from where Holston hid it in Gloria's room. Sims's raiders arrive at Gloria's room to apprehend Juliette, who is not there.
8	8	"Hanna"	Adam Bernstein	Jeffery Wang & Ingrid Escajeda	June 16, 2023
Judicial searches the sheriff's office for the hard drive, but cannot find it. Juliette retaliates by using Billings's knowledge of the Pact to temporarily arrest Sims. While Sims is in custody, Juliette searches his office and finds files on Hanna, Walker, and Shirley Campbell. Hanna's file confirms that Judicial's surveillance cameras are how they knew that Hanna had built an illegal multi-lens magnifier; Hanna and Juliette had believed that Pete told Judicial. Juliette reconciles with Pete, and he tells her that Hanna's subversive behavior and suicide were a response to Jacob's death, which Hanna believed the magnifier technology could have prevented. Juliette is unable to access the hard drive's content; Lukas is too afraid to help and Judicial's checkpoints prevent her from reaching Walker. Bernard finds Juliette and reveals himself to be the true person in charge of the Silo and responsible for Jahns's and Marnes's deaths. Bernard and Sims arrest Juliette, take the hard drive and fraudulently claim that Juliette has asked to "go outside". Juliette jumps off the Silo's central stairs to escape with the hard drive.
9	9	"The Getaway"	Adam Bernstein	Lekethia Dalcoe	June 23, 2023
Juliette escapes and evades Judicial's cameras. Billings investigates Juliette's apartment and finds the children's travel book; he keeps one page but burns the rest. Juliette breaks into Sims's apartment and uses his computer to access the hard drive, on which she finds a video message George made for her. Bernard arrests Lukas and learns the hard drive's serial number, which he uses to find Juliette's location. Sims and his raiders rush to the apartment but Sims's wife allows her to escape. Juliette gets Patrick's help with Danny, an IT contact, to access the hard drive. She watches the rest of George's video, in which he tells her that he loves her and that she needs to find the door underneath the Silo. Following George's advice, Juliette, Patrick and Danny watch a video from a past cleaning, which shows a lush green landscape with birds flying outside the Silo.
10	10	"Outside"	Adam Bernstein	Fred Golan	June 30, 2023
Juliette has Danny broadcast the outside footage on the Silo's screens but this is quickly shut down by Bernard. Billings is questioned by Sims about his condition, and later tells his wife that they will make an exception so he can become sheriff. Juliette is arrested and Bernard offers her a deal: if she promises to go out, he will tell her what happened to George and will not punish Mechanical. Juliette agrees, and Bernard shows her footage of George jumping off the stairs of his own free will to avoid interrogation. Bernard destroys the hard drive but, influenced by Juliette, later recovers the disc. Bernard sentences Lukas to the mines. Juliette goes outside and realizes that the suit's helmet display shows the same recorded footage of a lush landscape, which is meant to deceive people into cleaning the camera, when reality is the desolate view on the Silo's screens. Because Walker arranged for Juliette's suit to be of good quality, Juliette doesn't die and climbs out of the crater-like depression that surrounds the Silo, going out of view of its residents. She sees dozens of similar craters around, each presumably with a silo, and a ruined city on the horizon.

=== Season 2 (2024–25) ===
No. overall	No. in season	Title	Directed by	Written by	Original release date
11	1	"The Engineer"	Michael Dinner	Graham Yost	November 15, 2024
In a flashback, Silo 17 revolts, and its population escapes. In the present, Juliette breaks into Silo 17 by climbing over the corpses of its dead inhabitants littered outside the entrance. Juliette explores the silo's upper levels to find it abandoned, and the lower levels flooded. The bridge leading into the IT department has been destroyed, so Juliette builds a makeshift bridge that collapses after she gets across. In a flashback, young Juliette starts her new life in Mechanical, where she helps sort through trash from the upper levels and befriends Shirley. After struggling with her new position, she impresses the other workers by fixing a broken toy and begins working under Walker. In the present, Juliette continues exploring and follows the sound of music to the locked vault door in the IT department. After Juliette fails to open the door, a man on the other side warns her that if she tries again, he will kill her.
12	2	"Order"	Michael Dinner	Fred Golan	November 22, 2024
Bernard watches Juliette's suit camera from inside the vault and sees her approach Silo 17 before it cuts off. As Juliette refused to clean, Bernard understands that her sign of defiance may lead to revolution. He places the deputies under Sims's command and sets a mandatory curfew to control the Silo's population, who are asking questions about Juliette's survival. Bernard tries to convince Meadows to help, and has Walker and her ex-wife Carla locked up for smuggling Juliette the tape that sealed her suit. Shirley starts interrogating people on the lower levels to demand answers, while Knox tries to stop her. Bernard gives his speech to the silo and claims that IT produced a new tape that allowed Juliette to survive longer, but remains adamant that she is dead. Meadows endorses him. While the majority of the population seems pleased with the explanation, Shirley remains unconvinced and organizes a secret meeting outside curfew. After Bernard thanks Meadows for her help, she demands to be given an environmental suit with good tape in order to go outside.
13	3	"Solo"	Aric Avelino	Cassie Pappas	November 27, 2024
In Silo 17, Juliette learns from the man in the vault, "Solo", that 50 silos exist and that her actions may cause a revolution. Solo gives Juliette food and suggests that she can use a firefighter's suit to return to her silo, but the fire safety equipment is in a flooded area. Juliette requests Solo's help to reach it; he at first refuses but changes his mind and exits the vault. In Silo 18, the worker Teddy is arrested for writing the graffiti "Juliette Lives". Sims offers an incarcerated Patrick a drug that will help him forget his deceased wife in exchange for a favor and recruits retired raiders to send down to Mechanical. Shirley leads some protestors to demand Teddy's release, but Patrick throws a firebomb at the deputies, and in the resulting chaos the new engineer Cooper is killed. Pete meets a woman who hopes to win a lottery that will allow her to have a child, and defies orders not to remove her birth control by performing the procedure anyway. Billings interviews everyone present during Juliette's arrest and brings his report to Meadows, stating that Juliette never asked to go outside.
14	4	"The Harmonium"	Aric Avelino	Sal Calleros	December 6, 2024
With Solo's help, Juliette builds an air pump to help her through the flooded levels to collect a firefighter suit. Solo tells Juliette about the outside world from before and struggles with anxiety about leaving the vault. Knox shares with Shirley his belief that their silo has had multiple rebellions, which were blamed on Mechanical because of their ability to shut down the silo. He also requests to speak with Meadows, who agrees to meet. Sims becomes suspicious of Bernard's relationship with Meadows and fabricates a movement to demand Meadows's impeachment. Meadows allows Lukas to protest his sentence and reduces it to five years. Billings investigates the riot in Mechanical and learns that the body of the instigator has disappeared, and Judicial has claimed Cooper's body. Bernard poisons Meadows, and before she dies she tells him that on the hard drive Juliette stole, there is a coded letter from Salvador Quinn, who was head of IT during the rebellion 140 years ago. Knox, Shirley, Walker, and Carla arrive at Judicial, where Bernard has set up Meadows's body to frame Knox and Shirley for her murder. Sims whips up a crowd and sends it after them.
15	5	"Descent"	Amber Templemore	Jenny DeArmitt-Stran	December 13, 2024
Solo asks Juliette to repair a water pump because the water level is rising and will reach IT in ten months, but Juliette insists she needs to return to her silo immediately. Juliette suspects that Solo is lying about his identity, and he reacts angrily to her questioning. Juliette finds a usable suit helmet but collapses from injuries. In Silo 18, Bernard is aware that Sims fabricated the movement against Meadows and denies him the role of Bernard's shadow but makes him Judge to replace Meadows, which frustrates Sims. Sims's wife Camille helps Knox and Shirley evade the mob. Rick Amundsen, the new head of Judicial Security, has Carla arrested but Knox, Shirley, and Walker bypass the blockade and travel to the lower levels. Bernard has Lukas fix Juliette's hard drive, revealing hidden connections in the silo to the outside world and a coded letter by Salvador Quinn to his wife. Billings and deputy Hank track down Patrick, who offers to tell Billings truths about the Silo.
16	6	"Barricades"	Michael Dinner	Jeffery Wang	December 20, 2024
Tensions rise with Bernard blocking supplies to the lower levels and Knox having weapons made. At Billings's request, Pete travels to the lower levels to treat Patrick. Patrick tells Billings how he'd helped Juliette with the hard drive and accepted a deal from Sims to be agent provocateur at the protest in Mechanical. Bernard questions Camille about her action to protect Knox and Shirley, but she deflects him. Knox and Shirley lead a group attack on the blockade and push it ten floors higher, claiming the critical farm on level 122. Billings questions Walker, Knox, and Shirley about Meadows's death. When Billings tells Bernard via radio that he wants to open a formal investigation into Meadows's death, Bernard shuts down radio communication. Lukas works on decoding Quinn's letter, and the sophistication of the cipher prompts Bernard to make Lukas his shadow so he can access the Legacy. In Silo 17, Juliette wakes after being treated by Solo, who has hidden her suit to force her to fix the pump before leaving.
17	7	"The Dive"	Michael Dinner	Katherine DiSavino	December 27, 2024
Bernard introduces Lukas to the Legacy, an advanced computer behind a vault that contains all their secret knowledge and records, though the origins of the Silo beyond 352 years earlier remain lost. Using the Legacy to help with his research, Lukas suspects the letter uses a book cipher. Mechanical sends paper messages to the upper levels encouraging citizens to ask what IT has been hiding from them before shutting down power in the Silo, revealing that IT has their own independent power source. Bernard clashes with Sims, who is still angry about being set aside. Sims confronts Camille about her actions; she explains that she wants to play both sides for their safety, and promises to not hide anything from him again. Billings and Hank follow up on spies who are trying to sow discord in Mechanical. Walker worries about Carla and briefly switches on one of IT's cameras to send a message up top, which Bernard receives. In Silo 17, Juliette performs a deep dive to repair the water pump for Solo and almost drowns when her air supply is cut. After surfacing, Juliette finds evidence of a struggle and suspects there is someone else in the silo.
18	8	"The Book of Quinn"	Amber Templemore	Remi Aubuchon	January 3, 2025
Juliette gets the bends and has to dive again to recover. After surfacing, she is confronted by a figure who shoots her with an arrow and threatens to kill her. Juliette searches for her attacker and finds three young people. In Silo 18, Lukas tracks down Quinn's descendants and learns that they gave Quinn's copy of the Pact to Meadows years earlier. Bernard tells Lukas that Quinn destroyed the records 140 years ago and drugged the water in order to make citizens forget their history, to stop the rebellions that had been occurring every 20 years. Using Quinn's Pact, Lukas starts decoding Quinn's letter. Sims, with Camille's help, learns that Lukas is investigating for Bernard. Walker meets Bernard and agrees to be his informant in order to save Carla. Consequently a group of Mechanical who break into Supply are arrested by raiders. Billings's wife Kathleen learns that Billings saved a page of a picture book from the "before times", and demands to see it.
19	9	"The Safeguard"	Amber Templemore	Jessica Blaire	January 10, 2025
Juliette is confronted by Audrey, leader of five young survivors, who orders Juliette to open the vault, so they can access the food. Audrey has captured Solo and wants to kill him for the death of their parents. Juliette realizes that Solo was a child at the time of the rebellion, and Solo confesses that he killed the group's parents out of self-defense when they broke into the vault. Solo and the group make peace, and he allows everyone into the vault. In Silo 18, Lukas learns that there are 49 other Silos and, following Quinn's letter, travels to the lower levels. Lukas finds the tunnel underneath, where at a door a computer voice warns him not to tell anyone what he has seen, or they will initiate "the safeguard". Billings gives Sims the picture book page, which makes Camille and Sims consider joining the rebellion. Patrick tells Kathleen his suspicion that the Silo's display of the outside is a lie. Bernard blames the rebels' actions on Billings, but not all the top level deputies believe him. Bernard spies on Knox and Walker discussing the rebellion's plans.
20	10	"Into the Fire"	Amber Templemore	Aric Avelino	January 17, 2025
Walker works with Knox and the other rebels to use Bernard's camera to send him misinformation. They trick Bernard into sending the raiders below and transferring all rebels up top, after which Pete sacrifices himself to blow up the stairs in between. The up top deputies side with the rebels after receiving Billings's message via Sims. Patrick agitates the citizens into a mob that demands answers from Bernard. Lukas tells Bernard what he learned and resigns, which causes a despondent Bernard to make Sims his new IT shadow, handing over the vault key and password. Sims and his family enter the vault, but the Legacy says only Camille can stay. In Silo 17, Solo tells Juliette about the safeguard procedure, a pipe that can pump enough poison to kill everyone, and how it can be stopped. Juliette uses the firefighter suit and returns to Silo 18, which is seen inside and celebrated, but she shows a message warning them not to leave. Juliette enters as Bernard is leaving, and they are locked in the incinerator as it fires up. In an apparent flashback in Washington, D.C., a woman named Helen questions a new congressman about the possibility of the U.S. retaliating against Iran for supposedly having detonated a dirty bomb on U.S. soil.

=== Season 3 (2026) ===
No. overall	No. in season	Title	Directed by	Written by	Original release date
21	1	"Who Are You?"	Michael Dinner	Graham Yost	July 3, 2026
Three months after the rebellion, Silo 18 is peaceful. A new council has been established and is seemingly leading reform. Juliette has become the mayor but is being controlled by Camille, who is following the Legacy's instructions to feed Juliette memory-suppressing drugs. In a flashback, Bernard also survived the incinerator but was seemingly killed by Sims. Juliette receives a secret message offering to tell her the truth. Billings and Sims are searching for members of the Outsiders, a remaining group of rebels who believe that it is safe to go outside. In the past, Congressman Daniel Keene tries to get onto Senator Rosalind Thurman's committee for military action against Iran, in retaliation for a supposed Iranian "dirty bomb" attack in Washington, D.C. after being urged to do so by his sister, Charlotte. Charlotte, a naval aviator, is part of the mission into Iran when her squadron's planes are downed by a cloud of mysterious technology. Senator Thurman has Charlotte admitted to the Heidi Stensen Clinic in Fairfax for her injuries, but when Daniel visits her, she does not recognize him.
22	2	"It's All Good"	Michael Dinner	Shelley Birse	July 10, 2026
Juliette follows the message's instructions and meets Outsiders Sandy, Patrick, and Danny, who believe in a conspiracy to hide what Juliette saw outside and make her question what she has been told. Billings' wife Kathleen is also an Outsider, which he is reluctantly keeping hidden. Knox tells Juliette about Lukas, who has been missing but might be able to answer her questions. Juliette stops taking her pills, but her nurse finds a pill in the sink. Camille is frustrated that Juliette is resisting the memory-suppressing drugs, but she and the Legacy are preparing for a memory reset of the whole Silo via the water supply. Billings investigates the disappearance of Orla Kent, shadow to the Head of Supply. In the past, Daniel meets Charlotte's doctor Victor Crnkovich, who has been doing controversial tests on human subjects on memory suppression and recall. Journalist Helen Drew is caught sneaking in to meet Charlotte, whom she had been meeting before the Iran mission to share her doubts on the government's intentions. Helen asks if Daniel will help her uncover the truth.
23	3	"A Dark Web"	Michael Dinner	Aric Avelino	July 17, 2026
Juliette travels down the Silo to investigate Lukas's movements. Camille is aware that Juliette has been spitting her pills into the sink, but allows it to continue as she hopes Juliette will enable them to find Lukas and Outsiders, preventing the need for a full reset of the Silo. Camille realizes that Lukas may be in the mines digging towards another Silo, and orders the mines immediately fumigated. Juliette enters the poisoned mines and is saved by Lukas, who then flees and is found by Sandy and Danny. Billings identifies Orla as one of the dead in the mines. The Legacy suggests to Camille that she allow Juliette, who is unconscious and under medical care, to die and be made a martyr in order to preserve peace in the Silo. In the past, Helen is fired because of her investigation into the Iran incident. She and Daniel meet a dark web hacker who made a recording of the mission's audio, as the pilots had been ordered to use old radios. When Daniel and Helen return to the hacker to get a copy of the recording, they find that the place has been ransacked.
24	4	"Whatever You Do, Don't Go Home"	Aric Avelino	Jessica Blaire	July 24, 2026
Camille tells Sims about her decision to kill Juliette, but Juliette's nurse helps her escape. Camille and Sims lead the hunt for Juliette, but she evades them and is found by Shirley, who agrees to take her to the void underneath the Silo. In the void, Juliette finds Bernard, still alive. Lukas tells the Outsiders that the outside is not safe, which Patrick refuses to believe. Billings learns that Orla was murdered. In the past, Helen and Daniel are approached by a man who threatens them to stop their investigation. Daniel asks for help from his friend Sam Ramsey, who works in the Pentagon and has his own suspicions about the Iran mission.
25	5	"Memory"	Aric Avelino	Katherine DiSavino	July 31, 2026
In a flashback, Juliette and Bernard are rescued from the incinerator by Knox, Shirley, Billings, and others. Camille, newly Head of IT, tells Sims that Juliette, Bernard and Lukas need to die, but Sims decides to work against Camille after learning about the safeguard from Bernard. Sims gets Walker and Carla to fake Bernard's death, and encourages Juliette's veneration so she cannot be killed without reigniting rebellion. Bernard teaches Walker how to contact the other Silos, and that Silo 1 has the power to activate the safeguard in all other Silos. When Juliette finds Bernard, he and Sims tell her they had her pills switched out because she needs to remember how to stop the safeguard. Sims, Walker and others give Juliette relics of her past in hopes of triggering her memory, with the relic George once gave her succeeding. Billings learns from Carla that Orla had been investigating thefts of the Silo's critical supplies, which they cannot manufacture. In the past, Daniel tells Helen that Sam contacted him about Per Stensen, an advocate for AI control who was involved in the Iran mission. Before they can meet an informant, an unknown force takes control of their car.
26	6	"The Drive"	Alrick Riley	Sal Calleros	August 7, 2026
Juliette tells Lukas, Walker and the others about how Silo 17 blocked their safeguard pipe. Upon revealing her returned memories to Camille, Juliette gets permission from the Legacy for two people to bring the Silo 17 survivors to Silo 18, but the volunteers' secret mission is to also learn about the safeguard pipe in Silo 17. Juliette is only able to volunteer Lukas and Patrick to go, as Camille and the Legacy want them to die in the attempt. Pressured by Juliette's actions, Camille has the memory-suppression drugs immediately delivered into the Silo's water system. Billings recruits Hank into the Orla investigation, telling him about the critical supply issue that leaves their Silo only two years of usable light bulbs for farming. Billings and Hank check the Silo's security footage, which shows Glenda Harwood, the previous shadow of Supply, at two places at once during the gassing of the mines. In the past, Daniel and Helen are brought to a hangar where Thurman is waiting for them and asks if they want to help save the world.
27	7	"Radio"	Aric Avelino	Remi Aubuchon	August 14, 2026
Sims warns Juliette that the drugs have been put in the water, which forces her to send Lukas and Patrick outside quickly, but the pair are shot at as they approach Silo 17. Teddy presents Juliette an alternative plan to blow up the pipes in Judicial, which Juliette initially rejects as it may harm bystanders. Bernard has Gloria, who has been taken off the memory-suppression drugs, brought to Juliette to tell her about the hysteria and death that happened the last time the entire Silo was drugged, which convinces Juliette to reluctantly approve the mission. Using Judicial passes supplied by Sims, Teddy and his team almost blow up Judicial but stop when Patrick contacts Walker via radio, confirming he and the Silo 17 children are all right. Camille confronts Sims over his subversive actions. Billings and Hank question Glenda's father Ed Harwood, and Knox learns that his father may have faked his death with Ed's help. In the past, Daniel and Helen sign an NDA after being pressured by Thurman and Per Stensen, and they all travel by plane with Charlotte, Anna, and Victor to Stensen's project in Georgia which is using a massive land drill to dig into the ground.
28	8	"Gray Goo"	Amber Templemore	Jenny DeArmitt-Stran	August 21, 2026
Lukas has been shot, but he and Patrick make it to Silo 17, where Jimmy and the others treat him. Patrick and Lukas find the Silo 17 safeguard pipe, which Jimmy's mother welded shut, and send this information to Juliette. Juliette and Shirley prepare to close their pipe, but Juliette is arrested by Camille's raiders while Shirley escapes. Knox finds his father, who tells Billings and Hank that he designed an elevator for Ed, which Ed secretly built to traverse the Silo and hide supplies. With this information, Billings pressures Ed into revealing that Glenda's ex-boyfriend Mike killed Orla. In the past, Stensen and Thurman explain that they are building 50 silos as human "seed banks" to repopulate the Earth, as they fear an apocalyptic war may consume the planet. The Iranian "dirty bomb" was a cover story for an advanced nanoweapon, and Charlotte's mission was to test Iran's nanotechnology capabilities. Thurman invites Charlotte, Daniel and Helen to join the project. Charlotte stays but Daniel and Helen reject the offer and leave; they kiss in the departing helicopter.
29	9	"Farewell"	Amber Templemore	Jeffery Wang	August 28, 2026
Bernard gives himself up to Camille as a distraction. Camille offers Juliette a deal so they can keep the Silo safe when the drugs take effect, but Juliette rejects it. Bernard advises Juliette to be the leader the Silo needs, and shares his suspicion that the voice of the Legacy is actually a person in Silo 1. Silo residents gather to watch the screens as Bernard goes outside without a suit and dies, and at the same time Knox and the others collectively use Ed's elevator, explosives, and drills to make their way to the safeguard pipe. In the past, Daniel and Helen are expecting a baby, and Charlotte has married Anna. Daniel and Helen attend the silos' opening launch near Atlanta, with Helen sent to a tour of Silo 18 while Daniel is brought to Silo 1 to meet Thurman, Stensen, Victor, and Anna. Daniel grows nervous when he receives a text message from Charlotte that he believes is fake. As he and Helen call each other, a massive nuclear explosion erupts in the distance, with the blast radius enveloping the silos. Daniel and Helen are pulled into the separate silos.
30	10	"Troy"	Amber Templemore	Fred Golan	September 4, 2026
In a flashback to the Silo 17 rebellion, Daniel is revived from cryogenic sleep in Silo 1. Re-named Troy, he cannot remember his past and is a specialist who is repeatedly woken for short periods to handle crises for The Project, now led by director Thurman. Using armed drones and poison, Troy orchestrates the execution of all the Silo 17 population who have exited their Silo, leaving no more than a hundred people alive inside. During his waking periods, Troy has memory flashes of Helen and asks Victor about her. In the present, Camille tricks Victor, who is currently acting as the Legacy, into giving Knox and the others time to successfully block the safeguard pipe while Walker and Carla fix the water supply. Victor sends a drone to guard Silo 18 and requests Troy be revived once more before killing himself. Juliette and Lukas communicate by radio about the door underneath the Silo. Juliette, Camille, Knox, Shirley and Hank follow Lukas's route to the door where Troy, as the Legacy, offers to leave them alone if Silo 18 does not try to contact any other Silo. Juliette accepts, but tells the group that their next move should be to attack Silo 1, something Silo 1 will not be expecting. Troy receives a pre-recorded video message from Victor telling him that the woman he remembers is Helen Drew, a name that triggers an intense emotional reaction.

=== Season 4 ===
No. overall	No. in season	Title	Directed by	Written by	Original release date
31	1	TBA	TBA	Graham Yost	July 9, 2027

The remaining episodes were written by:

2. Jessica Blaire
3. Shelley Birse
4. Sal Calleros
5. Jenny DeArmitt-Stran
6. Katherine DiSavino
7. Birse
8. Jeffery Wang
9. Aric Avelino
10. Fred Golan

== Production ==
=== Development ===
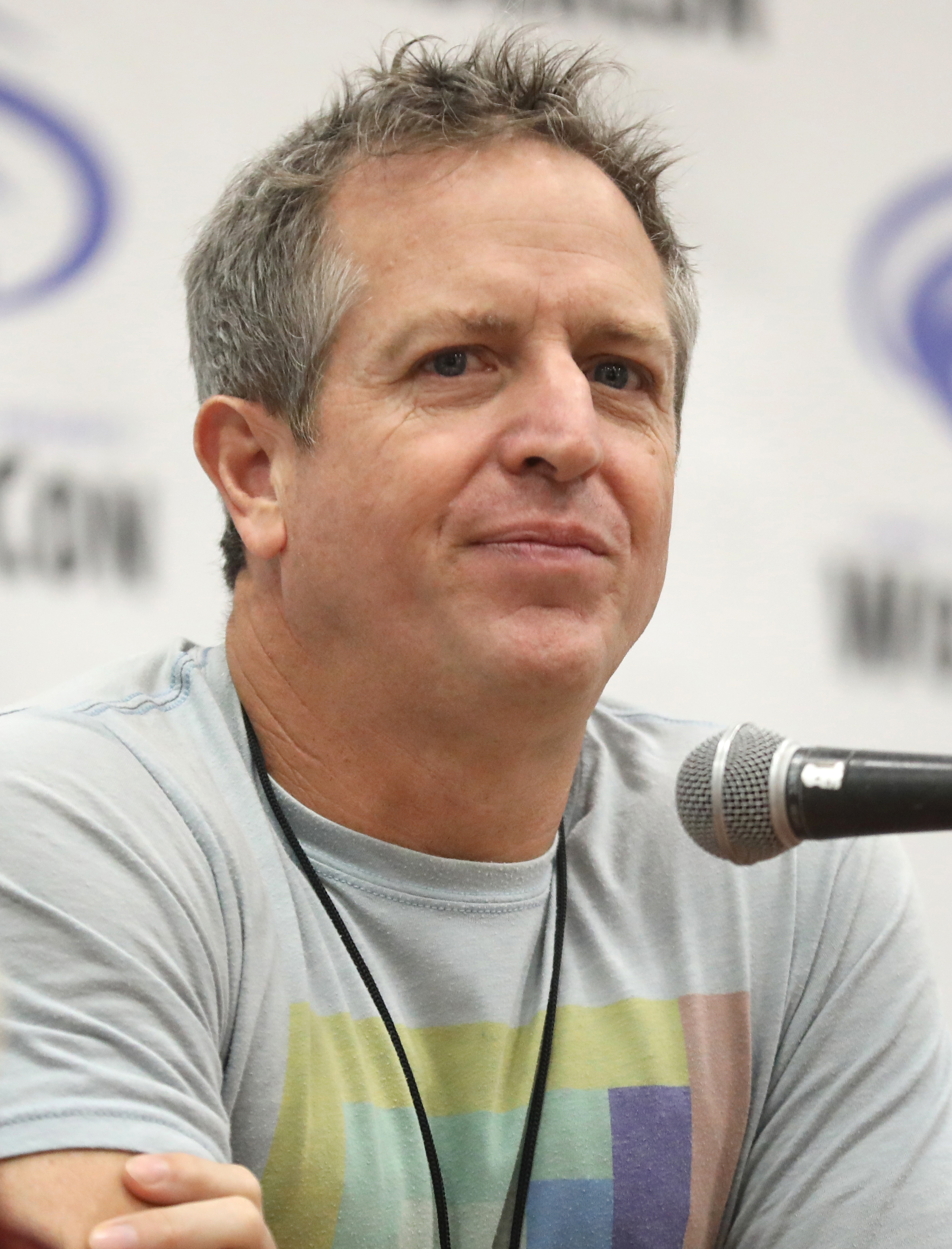
Wool author Hugh Howey

The project's development was originally announced as a feature film at 20th Century Fox, which entered negotiations to acquire the self-published e-book Wool by Hugh Howey on May 11, 2012. Five days later, 20th Century Fox acquired the rights, with Ridley Scott and Steven Zaillian among those attached to produce. On November 28, it was announced that J Blakeson was in negotiations to write and direct. It was then announced on June 5, 2015, that Nicole Perlman would rewrite the screenplay, with Blakeson no longer involved in the project. The film was ultimately shelved as a result of the acquisition of 21st Century Fox by Disney.

By July 30, 2018, a new iteration of the project was in development for television at AMC, with LaToya Morgan attached to write under her overall deal at AMC Studios. The series eventually moved to Apple TV+ on May 20, 2021, receiving an order for ten episodes. Graham Yost replaced Morgan as creator and writer, marking his third series at Apple TV+ under his overall deal with the network. Morten Tyldum was also attached to direct and executive produce, with Yost as showrunner.

Silo was renewed for a second season in June 2023. In April 2024, Rebecca Ferguson stated in an interview that they are looking to shoot seasons 3 and 4 back-to-back, which would end the series. On December 16, 2024, the series was renewed for both a third and a fourth, final season.

=== Writing ===
Alongside Yost, Jessica Blaire, Cassie Pappas, Ingrid Escajeda, Remi Aubuchon, Aric Avelino, Jeffery Wang, Lekethia Dalcoe, and Fred Golan served as writers for the first season; Sal Calleros, Jenny DeArmitt-Stran, and Katherine DiSavino joined for the second season; and Shelley Birse joined for the third.

According to Yost, the first and second seasons adapt the first book, Wool, the third season adapts the second book, Shift, and the fourth season adapts the third book in the trilogy, Dust.

=== Casting ===
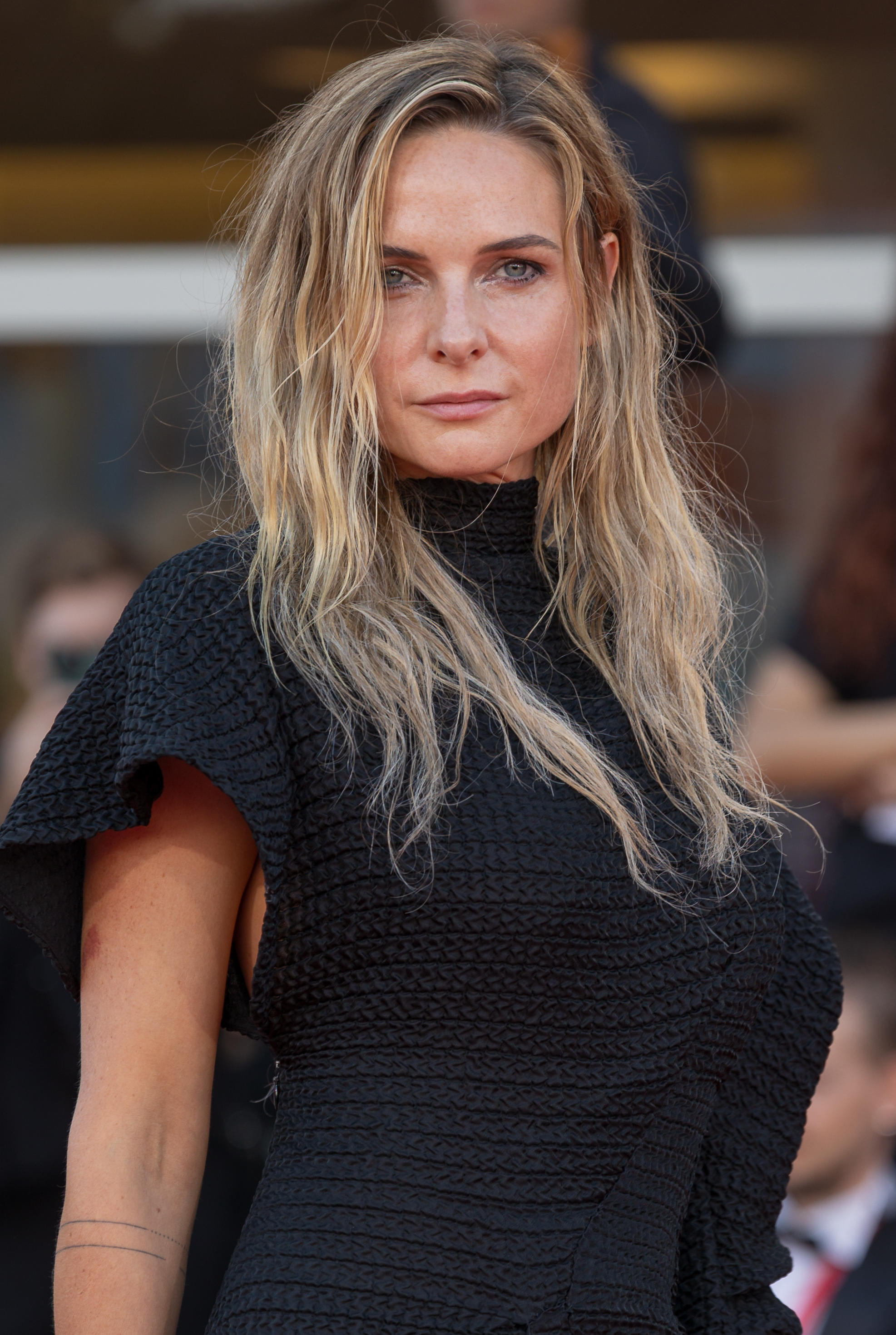
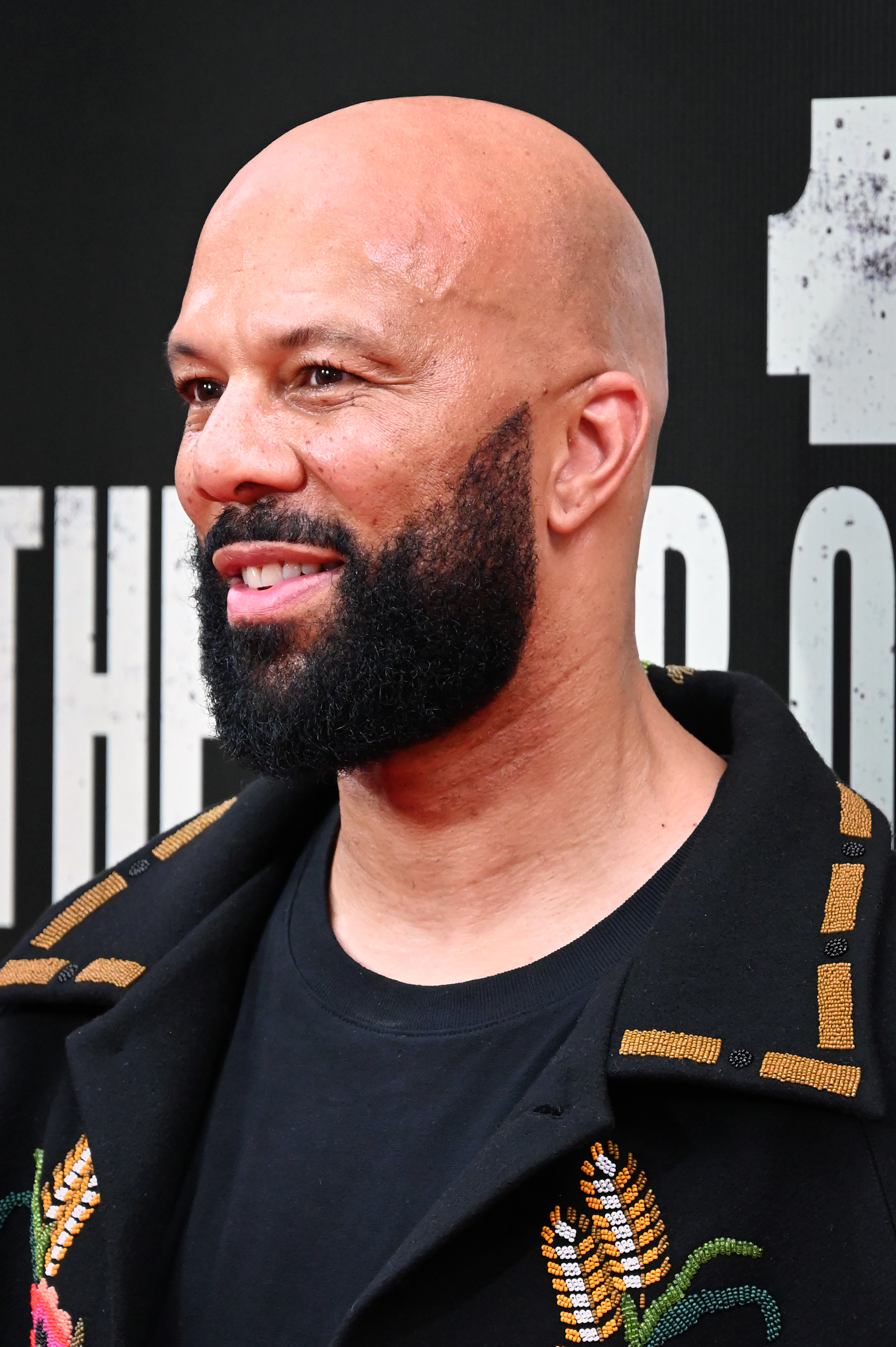
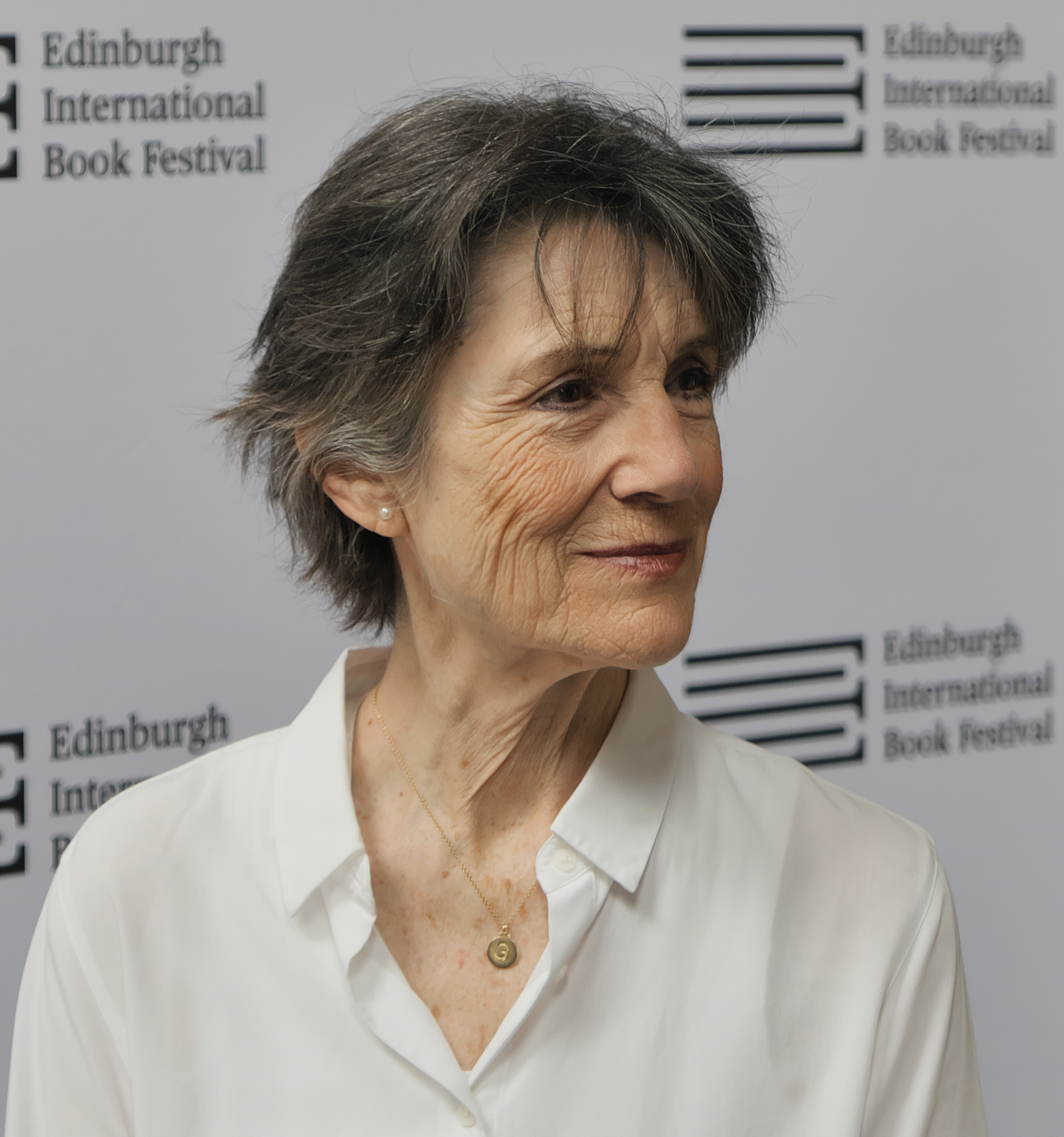
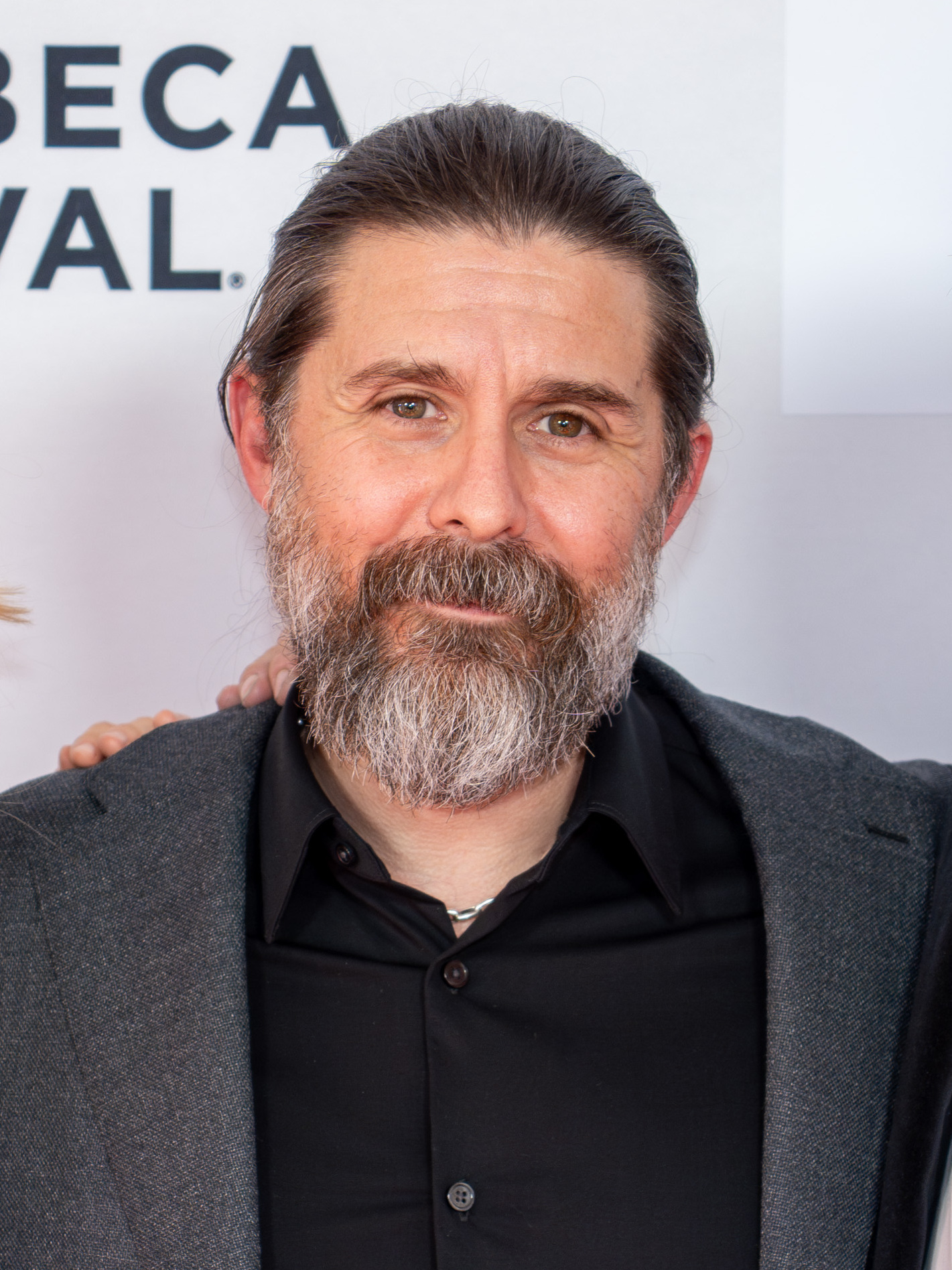
Clockwise from upper left: Rebecca Ferguson, Common, Rick Gomez, Harriet Walter

With the series order announcement, it was also announced that Rebecca Ferguson had been cast in a lead role. Tim Robbins joined the cast in August 2021, and Rashida Jones, David Oyelowo, Common, Harriet Walter, Avi Nash and Chinaza Uche joined in the following months. On July 27, 2024, it was announced at San Diego Comic-Con that Steve Zahn had joined the cast for the second season. On January 17, 2025, it was announced that Ashley Zukerman and Jessica Henwick had joined the cast as series regulars for the third season.

=== Filming ===
Principal photography began in late August 2021 in Hoddesdon, Hertfordshire, and was scheduled to last until the second quarter of 2022. Mark Patten, David Luther, and Laurie Rose were cinematographers. Gavin Bocquet was the production designer, credited with the design of the silo. The main set consists of three levels of stairs decorated to represent particular locations.

The second season began filming in late June 2023 at Hoddesdon Studios, using the same set as season one. Filming was suspended in July due to the 2023 SAG-AFTRA strike. Production restarted in early December 2023, and wrapped on March 8, 2024. Filming for season three began in October 2024, also at Hoddesdon Studios, as well as at OMA One and OMA X Film Studios in Enfield, London, and wrapped in May 2025. The fourth and final season began filming in August 2025, and finished in March 2026.

=== Music ===
In March 2023, Atli Örvarsson was announced as the series' composer. He collaborated with Tyldum on the Apple TV+ series Defending Jacob.

SILO: Season 1 (Apple TV+ Original Series Soundtrack)
No.	Title	Length
1.	"SILO Main Title"	1:39
2.	"Irrevocable"	3:10
3.	"I Want to Go Out"	1:32
4.	"Juliette"	1:24
5.	"Overheating"	3:25
6.	"Amazing Adventures"	2:13
7.	"Spoken Request"	4:24
8.	"The Syndrome"	1:58
9.	"Night Lights"	2:28
10.	"Unsee"	2:48
11.	"Time With You"	3:04
12.	"Dr. Nichols"	3:46
13.	"We Do Not Know"	3:54
14.	"Last Request"	2:55
15.	"Leaving the Silo"	3:26
16.	"They're Lying"	2:12
17.	"The Descent"	2:41
18.	"Race to the Top"	2:04
19.	"Chit Chat"	2:51
20.	"Under Control"	2:27
Total length:		54:21

SILO: Season 2 (Apple TV+ Original Series Soundtrack)
No.	Title	Length
1.	"Save My Silo"	2:43
2.	"Sea of Skulls"	1:37
3.	"Silo 17"	2:45
4.	"Solo"	2:55
5.	"On the Inside"	4:32
6.	"Mirror Mirror"	1:53
7.	"Ambush"	2:29
8.	"Something to Believe In"	1:39
9.	"Solved the Code"	5:01
10.	"Ice Cream"	2:45
11.	"Underwater"	2:19
12.	"I Get It"	1:44
13.	"Rebels Caught"	1:12
14.	"Factor You In"	1:41
15.	"Wish Me Luck"	2:46
16.	"Deep Dive"	2:05
17.	"Turbine On"	1:16
18.	"What Did You Say to Bernard"	1:53
19.	"Opening Silo 18"	1:19
20.	"Burn to Death"	2:05
Total length:		46:39

SILO: Season 3 (Apple TV Original Series Soundtrack)
No.	Title	Length
1.	"SILO: Season 3 Main Title"	1:56
2.	"Vitamins"	5:02
3.	"Washington"	2:36
4.	"Who Are You?"	2:03
5.	"Iranian Skies"	3:34
6.	"Troy"	1:59
7.	"Not Enough Time"	2:47
8.	"Off Shift"	2:32
9.	"Out at Dawn"	2:57
10.	"Save the World"	1:27
11.	"The Delivery"	2:36
12.	"Double the Dosage"	2:01
13.	"Annihilation"	3:18
14.	"Fugitives"	1:49
15.	"Oxygen"	2:06
16.	"Wrapped in Plastic"	1:31
17.	"The Recording"	3:35
18.	"No Longer Necessary"	2:47
Total length:		46:36

== Marketing and release ==
=== Season 1 ===
Ahead of the series' premiere, Apple TV+ launched a promotional campaign titled "Silo Residences", presenting the silo as a luxury real estate development under construction. Billboards at a construction site in Los Angeles advertised apartments located 144 stories underground, using slogans such as "You may never go outside again" and "A new standard for orderly sustainable living". The campaign also included a website, siloresidences.com, which initially resembled a real estate development site, then featured a glitch effect that replaced the word "Residences" with "Streaming May 5", accompanied by the Apple TV+ logo and a link to the series' official trailer. The campaign won a Silver award at the 2024 Clio Entertainment Awards in the Fan Engagement medium and Experiential & Activations category, and received two nominations at the 2024 Webby Awards in the Digital Campaign and Best Use of Social Media categories.

Apple TV+ released the official teaser on March 6, 2023, along with a set of first-look images, followed by the official trailer on April 6. The first episode received a special out-of-competition screening at the sixth Canneseries festival on April 14, 2023, attended by director Morten Tyldum, series creator and screenwriter Graham Yost, and Rebecca Ferguson. Apple TV+ held the series' world premiere at Battersea Power Station in London on April 25, with Ferguson and other cast members in attendance, alongside Yost, Tyldum, and author Hugh Howey. The season premiered globally on the platform on May 5, 2023, with the first two episodes released simultaneously, followed by a new episode each Friday, concluding with the tenth and final episode on June 30. Three days before the season finale, on June 27, Apple TV+ posted the entire first episode on its Twitter account, using a newly introduced feature that allowed longer video uploads.

=== Season 2 ===
Silo made its debut at San Diego Comic-Con on July 27, 2024, with a panel in Ballroom 20 featuring Ferguson, Common, Yost, and Howey, moderated by Adam Savage. Steve Zahn surprised the audience with an appearance, during which Apple announced his casting as Solo and revealed that the new season would premiere on November 15, then screened an exclusive clip for the audience. Apple hosted an interactive experience titled "Silo Level 143" at Nason's Beer Hall in Gaslamp Quarter, San Diego, where visitors could take part in activities inspired by the series, including getting temporary airbrushed tattoos. On October 14, 2024, Apple released the official trailer. The season's world premiere took place on October 29, 2024, at Picturehouse Central in London, attended by Ferguson, Robbins, Common, Zahn, and other cast members. The season premiered on Apple TV+ on November 15, 2024, with ten episodes released weekly, and concluded on January 17, 2025.

=== Season 3 ===
On April 21, 2026, Apple TV unveiled the first images and released a teaser announcing the series' return on July 3. The official trailer followed on June 2, introducing two parallel timelines: one follows Juliette after she survives her forced cleaning and returns with memory loss, while the other is set in the "Before Times", where journalist Helen Drew and Congressman Daniel Keene uncover a conspiracy that draws them into a chain of catastrophic events. Molly Templeton of Reactor criticized the memory-loss storyline, writing that it seemed like "a way to drag out the plot," while Louise Griffin of Radio Times described the apparent manipulation of Juliette's memories as a "deeply worrying turn of events" and noted that the storyline marked a major departure from Howey's novels. On June 27, Howey explained that the story was inspired by the theme of history repeating itself, as successive generations repeat past mistakes because they fail to understand their causes or remember the lessons learned by those before them. He also clarified that the storyline was "not an attempt to reset the plot so we can cover old ground," adding that the silo system makes revolution nearly impossible.

On July 1, Apple launched an interactive website titled "How Did We Lose This World?". Designed to resemble a virtual Mac desktop, the site allowed users to explore files and folders containing exclusive clips, images, Easter eggs, and hints about the season's plot. The season premiered on Apple TV on July 3, with its ten episodes released weekly through September 4. During San Diego Comic-Con 2026, Apple TV transformed a vacant lot into a themed installation inspired by Silo. Small groups of fans explored the installation, which featured a rusted silo exterior, brand ambassadors portraying characters from the series, hidden clues and mysterious messages, and reflective surfaces and lighting effects that made the structure appear larger than it was. Visitors also received commemorative pins, while rapper Common gave a surprise performance outside the installation. On July 25, Yost and cast members Ferguson, Common, Robbins, Ashley Zukerman, Jessica Henwick, and Alexandria Riley participated in an Apple TV panel in Hall H, moderated by Josh Horowitz. Ferguson addressed criticism of Juliette's amnesia storyline, recalling that she had read negative comments on YouTube. She urged viewers to watch three episodes before judging the plot, saying "It's more intelligent than just losing memories." She later expressed satisfaction that the initial criticism had subsided.

=== Season 4 ===
On December 16, 2024, Apple TV+ renewed Silo for a third and fourth season, confirming that the fourth would conclude the series' adaptation of Howey's trilogy. On July 25, 2026, Apple announced at San Diego Comic-Con that the final season would premiere in summer 2027 and unveiled a short promotional video. On September 4, 2026, Apple announced that the season is set to premiere on July 9, 2027, and released a sneak peek. The announcement coincided with the release of the third season's final episode.

== Reception ==
=== Critical response ===
Critical response of Silo
Season	Rotten Tomatoes	Metacritic
1	88% (69 reviews)	75 (20 reviews)
2	92% (53 reviews)	80 (12 reviews)
3	96% (79 reviews)	77 (12 reviews)

For the first season, the review aggregator website Rotten Tomatoes reported an 88% approval rating with an average rating of 7.7/10 based on 69 critic reviews. The website's critics consensus reads, "With deft writing, awe-inspiring production design and the inestimable star power of Rebecca Ferguson, Silo is a mystery box well worth opening." Metacritic, which uses a weighted average, assigned a score of 75 out of 100 based on 20 critics, indicating "generally favorable" reviews.

Richard Roeper of Chicago Sun-Times wrote that the series "holds our interest with intriguing characters and effective twists and turns", and took note of how Silo "shifts gears through a number of genres, from conspiracy thriller to big-picture social commentary to police procedural to end-times romance". Lucy Mangan of The Guardian opined that the "world-building is meticulous" and "the story is equally thrilling". Vanity Fair's Richard Lawson found the show to be a "feat of production design", adding that "Ferguson—in all her stern command—lends the series a necessary heft". Barry Hertz of The Globe and Mail also picked up Ferguson's performance as a "standout". Conversely, Brian Lowry of CNN believed that the "inherent mystery [...] feels stretched to the point of strained, exacerbated by characters that don't consistently pop". The Hollywood Reporter's Daniel Fienberg also praised the world-building and Ferguson's performance, but was critical of the performance of Common, whom he termed "the weak link in the cast".

For the second season, Rotten Tomatoes reported a 92% approval rating with an average rating of 6.95/10 based on 53 critic reviews. The website's critics consensus reads, "Rebecca Ferguson's intrepid hero seeks answers while the rest of Silo's ensemble capably holds down the fort in this superb sophomore season." Metacritic assigned a score of 80 out of 100 based on 12 critics, indicating "generally favorable" reviews. Writing for The Guardian, Leila Latif considered the season "smarter, more inventive" than its predecessor, praising its focus on supporting characters, but criticized its slow pacing and "murky" visuals. Louise Griffin of Radio Times described it as "another gloriously pacy yet fleshed-out instalment", highlighting the unfolding of its mysteries and the dynamic between Ferguson and Steve Zahn. In contrast, Nick Shager of The Daily Beast questioned the logic underlying the season’s premise, describing it as "founded on fundamental illogicalities", and criticized Juliette’s "disconnection from the rest of the proceedings’ characters and dilemmas", which he considered "a grave narrative miscalculation".

For the third season, Rotten Tomatoes reported a 96% approval rating with an average rating of 8.25/10 based on 79 critic reviews. The website's critics consensus reads, "Silo codifies its third season as a masterful dystopian tale with expertly driven character arcs and tighter narrative strings, fulfilling its promise of science fiction excellence." Metacritic assigned a score of 77 out of 100 based on 12 critics, indicating "generally favorable" reviews. Matt Fowler of IGN described it as the strongest season yet, praising the integration of the Before Times storyline with the events in Silo 18, the balance between mysteries and revelations, and Ferguson's performance. In a review for Empire, Latif noted that it becomes increasingly intriguing as it reveals more of its mysteries, but criticised its "glacial pace" and "cryptic dialogue", which requires close attention to understand the characters' true motivations. While Brian Tallerico of RogerEbert.com described it as "a transitional season", he found it less compelling than its predecessors, criticising its slow pace, the sidelining of established characters, and its role as an extended setup for the final season.

=== Accolades ===
Year	Award	Category	Nominee(s)	Result	Ref.
2024	Art Directors Guild Awards	Excellence in Production Design for a One-Hour Fantasy Single-Camera Series	Gavin Bocquet (for "Machines")	Nominated	
2024	Black Reel Awards	Outstanding Guest Performance in a Drama Series	Rashida Jones	Nominated	
2024	British Academy Television Craft Awards	Best Original Music: Fiction	Atli Örvarsson	Won	
2024	British Academy Television Craft Awards	Best Production Design	Gavin Bocquet, Amanda Bernstein	Won	
2024	British Academy Television Craft Awards	Best Costume Design	Charlotte Morris	Nominated	
2024	British Academy Television Craft Awards	Best Special, Visual & Graphic Effects	Daniel Rauchwerger, Stefano Pepin, Richard Stanbury, Raphael Hamm, Ian Fellows	Nominated	
2024	British Society of Cinematographers	GBCT Operators Award - Television Drama	James Layton and Justin Hawkins	Won	
2024	British Film Designers Guild Awards	Best Production Design – TV Band 3 & 4 Programmes	Amanda Bernstein, Gavin Bocquet, Phil Harvey	Won	
2024	Hollywood Music In Media Awards	Best Original Score - TV Show/Limited Series	Atli Örvarsson	Nominated	
2024	Primetime Emmy Awards	Primetime Emmy Award for Outstanding Title Design	Silo	Nominated	
2024	Primetime Emmy Awards	Primetime Emmy Award for Outstanding Music Composition for a Series (Original Dramatic Score)	Silo	Nominated	
2024	Royal Television Society Craft & Design Awards	Costume Design - Scripted	Charlotte Morris	Nominated	
2024	Saturn Awards	Best Science Fiction Television Series	Silo	Nominated	
2024	Saturn Awards	Best New Genre Television Series	Silo	Nominated	
2024	Saturn Awards	Best Actress in a Television Series	Rebecca Ferguson	Nominated	
2024	Satellite Awards	Best Actress in a Drama or Genre Series	Rebecca Ferguson	Nominated	
2024	Society of Composers & Lyricists	Outstanding Original Title Sequence for a Television Production	Atli Örvarsson	Nominated	
2024	Set Decorators Society of America Awards	Best Achievement in Décor/Design of a One Hour Fantasy or Science Fiction Series	Amanda Bernstein, Gavin Bocquet	Nominated	
2025	Satellite Awards	Best Genre Series	Silo	Nominated	
2025	Golden Trailer Awards	Best Digital – Drama	Apple TV+ / Create Advertising Group (for "360")	Nominated	
2025	Golden Trailer Awards	Best Action/Thriller TrailerByte for a TV/Streaming Series	Apple TV+ / Create Advertising (for "Rebellion")	Nominated	
2025	Golden Trailer Awards	Best BTS/EPK for a TV/Streaming Series (Over 2 minutes)	Apple / The Workhouse Picture Company Ltd (for "Behind Rebecca Ferguson's Character Tattoos")	Nominated	
