= Timothy Olyphant =

American actor (born 1968)

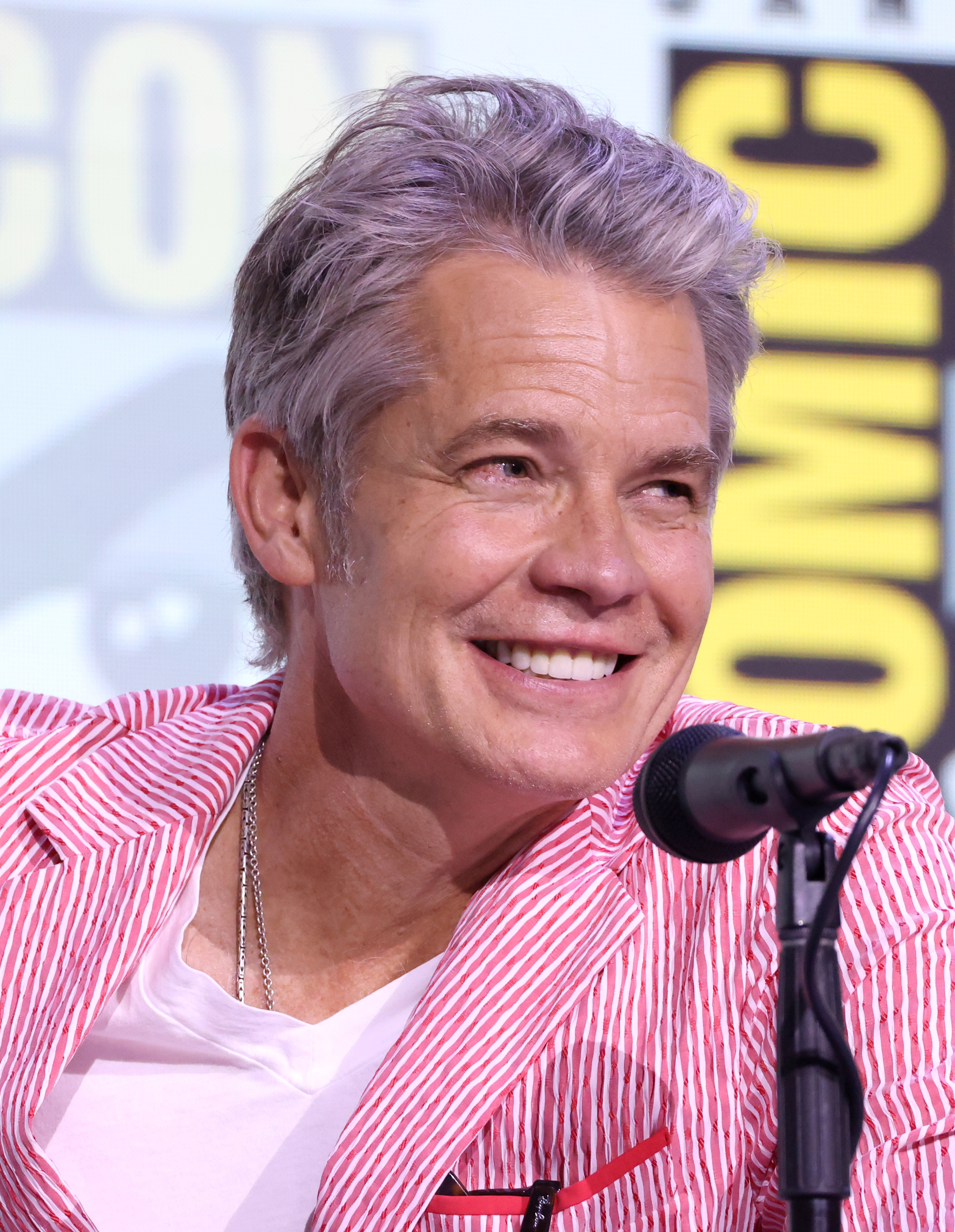
- Olyphant at the 2025 San Diego Comic-Con
- Born: Timothy David Olyphant; May 20, 1968 (age 58); Honolulu, Hawaii, U.S.
- Education: University of Southern California (BFA)
- Occupation: Actor
- Years active: 1995–present
- Spouse: Alexis Knief (m. 1991)
- Children: 3
- Relatives: Vanderbilt family

Timothy David Olyphant (/ˈɒlɪfənt/ OL-ih-fənt; born May 20, 1968) is an American actor. He made his acting debut in an off-Broadway theater in 1995 in The Monogamist, winning the Theatre World Award for his performance. Olyphant then originated David Sedaris' The Santaland Diaries in 1996. He then branched out to film. In the early years of his career, he was often cast in supporting villainous roles, most notably in Scream 2 (1997), Go (1999), Gone in 60 Seconds and The Broken Hearts Club (2000), A Man Apart (2003), and The Girl Next Door (2004).

Olyphant came to the attention of a wider audience with his portrayal of Sheriff Seth Bullock in HBO's western Deadwood (2004–2006), later reprising the role in Deadwood: The Movie (2019). He had starring roles in films such as Catch and Release (2006), Hitman (2007), A Perfect Getaway (2009), and The Crazies (2010). He also played the main antagonist, Thomas Gabriel, in Live Free or Die Hard (2007). Olyphant was a recurring guest star in season two of the FX legal thriller Damages (2009).

From 2010 to 2015, Olyphant starred as Deputy U.S. Marshal Raylan Givens in FX's modern-day Kentucky southern gothic Justified, a performance for which he was nominated for a Primetime Emmy Award for Outstanding Lead Actor in a Drama Series in 2011. Since the end of Justified, Olyphant has starred in films such as Mother's Day (2016), Snowden (2016), Once Upon a Time in Hollywood (2019), and Amsterdam (2022). He has also had notable guest appearances in numerous television sitcoms including The Office (2010), The Mindy Project (2013), and The Grinder (2015–2016), for which he won a Critics' Choice Award. He also starred in the Netflix comedy series Santa Clarita Diet (2017–2019). In 2020, he played himself in a brief cameo, parodying his Justified character, in the NBC award-winning show The Good Place. In the same year, he guest-starred in season 10 of Curb Your Enthusiasm, as well as in the fourth season of Fargo and the second season of The Mandalorian in the episode "Chapter 9: The Marshal" as Cobb Vanth, a role he later reprised in The Book of Boba Fett. Olyphant returned to the role of Raylan Givens in the 2023 miniseries Justified: City Primeval. In 2025, he starred in the FX series Alien: Earth.

== Early life and education ==
Born May 20, 1968 in Honolulu, Hawaii, Olyphant moved to Modesto, California, at the age of two. His parents are Katherine (née Gideon) Olyphant and John Vernon Bevan Olyphant, a wine executive. He has an older brother, Andrew, and a younger brother, Matthew. His parents divorced when he was a teenager; both remarried.

Olyphant is a descendant of the Vanderbilt family of New York. His paternal fourth great-grandfather was family patriarch Cornelius Vanderbilt. The surname Olyphant is of Scottish origin. His third great-grandfather, David Olyphant, and great-great-grandfather, Robert Morrison Olyphant, were both prominent businessmen. His maternal great-grandmother was Emily Vanderbilt Sloane

Olyphant attended Modesto's Fred C. Beyer High School. Growing up, he was "embarrassed" by the idea of acting, but enjoyed art and drawing. He swam competitively throughout his childhood and was a finalist at the 1986 Nationals, in the 200m Individual Medley. He was then recruited to the University of Southern California by USC Trojans swimming coach Peter Daland. When Olyphant first visited the campus as part of a recruitment trip, he hoped to study architecture but was told it would be unmanageable with his training schedule.

Instead, he opted to earn a Bachelor of Fine Arts. However, Olyphant left university one elective shy of a degree; he returned to finish the degree 30 years later, taking an online course during the COVID-19 pandemic. In 1990, he planned to finish his degree and apply for a master's degree in fine arts and half-heartedly considered a career in commercial art. While working as a swimming coach at Irvine Novaquatics, Olyphant decided to move to New York to explore other options. He initially performed stand-up comedy: "I'd dabbled [before] and then there was a six-month period where I did it with a certain commitment. Then I'd occasionally go back." Ultimately, he decided to become an actor. In his final year of college, he had taken an acting class as an elective at UC Irvine and found it "really enjoyable". He completed a two-year acting program at New York's William Esper Studio and began auditioning for roles.

== Career ==
=== 1995–2003: Early supporting roles ===
Olyphant's first paid acting job was in a 1995 WB television pilot based on 77 Sunset Strip. Phyllis Huffman cast him in the role but he did not have an opportunity to meet the show's producer, Clint Eastwood, who quit days before filming began. Later that year, he made his professional Off Broadway debut in the Playwrights Horizons' production of The Monogamist and received the Theatre World Award for Outstanding Debut Performance. He starred in the world premiere of The SantaLand Diaries (1996) at the Atlantic Theater Company, a one-man play based on David Sedaris' essay about working as a Macy's department store Christmas elf. Ben Brantley of The New York Times felt the "charming" Olyphant did "a wonderful job" when imitating other characters but had "a harder time finding a convincing style for the running narrative". Howard Kissel of The New York Daily News remarked that he delivered "all the drollery with a perfect deadpan and a twinkle" while David Patrick Stearns of USA Today described him as "an excellent young actor who successfully projects the world-weariness of a young 20-something who slowly evolves into somebody who just might believe in Christmas."

Olyphant made his feature film debut in The First Wives Club (1996) as an eager young director who attempts to cast Elise Elliot (Goldie Hawn) – who thinks she will be playing the leading lady – in the role of the elderly mother. Airing on the same day of that film's release, he made his television debut in the pilot of the CBS spy series Mr. & Mrs. Smith. In 1997, Olyphant made a guest appearance as Officer Brett Farraday in three episodes of the ABC police drama High Incident and returned to New York's Playwrights Horizons to play a supporting role in Plunge. He also had minor roles in the romantic comedy A Life Less Ordinary and the CBS television film Ellen Foster. Olyphant's most high-profile role of 1997 was as a film student later revealed as one of the killers in the successful horror film Scream 2, bringing "a degree of wild-eyed flair to the role," according to HitFix's Chris Eggertsen. He later described the role as "a gift. I had virtually nothing on my resume at that point. I'm sure some of it was made up."

Olyphant returned to television in 1998 for a guest starring role in an episode of the HBO sitcom Sex and the City, playing a love interest for Carrie Bradshaw. Sarah Jessica Parker later said the episode, "Valley of the Twenty Something Guys", was her favorite of the series. Also that year, he had supporting roles in the HBO war film When Trumpets Fade and the independent ensemble drama 1999. Two little-seen films were released in 1999: the drama Advice from a Caterpillar, in which Olyphant played the bisexual love interest of Cynthia Nixon's character, and the offbeat ensemble comedy No Vacancy, in which he starred with Christina Ricci. Olyphant received positive notices for portraying a drug dealer in the cult comedy Go (1999). Janet Maslin of The New York Times noted that the role was "played with offbeat flair" while Todd McCarthy of Variety described it as a "deftly etched" performance. He was set to star in the fantasy film Practical Magic, but he was replaced by Aidan Quinn.

After Olyphant's performance in Go, the film's producer Mickey Liddell offered him his choice of parts in his next project The Broken Hearts Club (2000), a romantic comedy about a group of gay friends living in West Hollywood. The Village Voice's Dennis Lim commented that his leading performance was better than the film deserved: "Olyphant is charismatic enough for his worst lines not to stick." However, Mick LaSalle of the San Francisco Chronicle felt he played the part "like a straight actor gaying it up". Olyphant played a detective in the successful action film Gone in 60 Seconds (2000) and joked in an interview about the challenges of playing "second fiddle to a car"; his performance reminded The Washington Post's Stephen Hunter of a young Bill Paxton.

Olyphant was offered a starring role for a character called Dominic Toretto in another car film called Redline – that would later be retitled The Fast and the Furious. According to Sony producer Neal H. Moritz, "The studio said, 'If you can get Timothy Olyphant to play that role we will greenlight the movie.'" Olyphant declined the role, which went to Vin Diesel. The film went on to be a massive success with nine sequels to date. Olyphant later discussed passing on a lot of roles earlier in his career. In 2011, when asked by The Hollywood Reporter what was the most absurd project he had ever been pitched, he replied, "I've passed on absurd projects and they have become enormous, enormous hits spawning numerous sequels, and I'm not in them." In 2018, he reflected on passing on the role of Toretto in The Fast and the Furious, thinking it would be "stupid" and would bomb at the box office.

Olyphant also had supporting roles in the musical comedy Rock Star, the crime drama Auggie Rose, and the romantic comedy Head Over Heels (all 2001). He starred in the short film Doppelganger (2001) and appeared in an episode of the Sci-Fi Channel horror series Night Visions (2002).

The independent drama Coastlines made its debut at the 2002 SXSW Festival, but failed to find a distributor until 2006. Olyphant starred opposite Josh Brolin as an ex-con who returns to his Florida hometown to collect a $200,000 debt. Kevin Crust of the Los Angeles Times wrote that he "possesses the kind of thousand-yard stare that suggests something deeper going on," while Owen Gleiberman of Entertainment Weekly remarked that "Olyphant, in the sort of role that Paul Newman used to swagger through, has a star's easy command." However, Todd McCarthy of Variety felt his performance "sort of floats along".

Olyphant's most high-profile role of 2003 was in A Man Apart, an action film starring Vin Diesel. Desson Howe of The Washington Post remarked that Olyphant "gets a kudo or two for [having] the good sense to realize he's playing one of the movie's many one-dimensional characters, so he might as well have insane fun". Similarly, Mick LaSalle of the San Francisco Chronicle noted that "the most lively character in "A Man Apart" turns out [to be] a middling drug dealer played to the hilt by Timothy Olyphant." He appeared in the film adaptation of Stephen King's horror novel Dreamcatcher as one of four friends attacked by parasitic aliens. The film was poorly reviewed, with David Rooney of Variety remarking: "Only Lee and Olyphant come close to hitting the right note of tongue-in-cheek humor that might have made all this palatable. Unfortunately, they're the first to go." Also in 2003, he appeared in the independent ensemble drama The Safety of Objects.

Olyphant received widespread praise for his 2004 performance as a porn film producer in the comedy The Girl Next Door. He was initially reluctant to audition for the part, feeling it was too similar to some of his previous roles but, "as my manager dutifully reminded me, not many people saw those movies." Mick LaSalle of the San Francisco Chronicle described the character of Kelly as "a leering, magnetic, frightening, glad-handing, easily-amused, hyper-sensitive, utterly deceitful, maddeningly likable wild man. When Olyphant is on screen, there's the feeling that things might go anywhere." A.O. Scott of The New York Times remarked that the part was played with "a throwaway inventiveness" while Kenneth Turan of the Los Angeles Times felt it was played "with wonderful comic zest". David Edelstein of Slate enjoyed his "spaced-out volatility. Olyphant's Kelly is a brilliant synthesis of poses." Joe Leydon of Variety said he "strikes an impressively deft balance of hearty amiability and understated menace in his scene-stealing turn".

In a 2015 interview, Olyphant reflected on the early stages of his film career, and not getting the leading roles that would have possibly led to major fame: "I got great opportunities right off the bat. And at the same time I either passed or failed to get things that would have made things ridiculously quick. I passed on enormous opportunities only to end up playing the supporting role in the next film. And then I'd think to myself, "What the fuck am I doing? Why did I do that?" But sometimes I feel like I got away with some things, because I've been able to work for a long time and I haven't had to deal with any kind of fame issues."

=== 2004–2009: Deadwood and leading film roles ===
Olyphant came to the attention of a wider audience when he was cast as Sheriff Seth Bullock in HBO's acclaimed western Deadwood, which aired for three seasons from 2004 to 2006. While he had previously been typecast "as a talkative, Jack Nicholson–styled, funny bad boy," in the words of Vulture's Matt Zoller Seitz, Deadwood gave him the opportunity to play a righteous, brooding lawman. The show's creator, David Milch, said of the casting choice: "Bullock's uprightness is an alternative to going medieval on people. You can see that same fire and that possibility in Tim, even at his most genial ... I'm not sure which poet talked about 'thoughts too deep for words,' but he brings that idea alive ... Tim is a guy that doesn't let himself be known easily."

While Bullock was initially introduced as Deadwood's protagonist, Emily VanDerWerff of The A.V. Club noted that the character of Al Swearengen came to "dominate the show ... This is not to slight Timothy Olyphant. He's a fine actor, and his portrayal of Bullock is frequently very, very good. Bullock is still unquestionably one of the most important characters on the show but the character of a Wild West lawman, no matter how revisionist it was in its portrayal of that lawman as someone who seemed barely in control at all times, just ended up not having as much to do in a blatantly revisionist Western about how chaos gives way to civilization." Matt Feeney of Slate described Bullock as "laconic, feral, hot-tempered and a little vain", and said the character was "not so much played as embodied by Olyphant". Alan Sepinwall of HitFix found his performance "fierce and commanding" while Jeremy Egner of The New York Times said that he showed "a capacity for explosive, nuanced performance barely suggested by earlier roles". The cast were nominated for the 2006 Screen Actors Guild Award for Outstanding Performance by an Ensemble in a Drama Series.

Years later, Olyphant remarked that Deadwood "almost has done more for me since we wrapped than while it was on. I continue to draw from it, to steal from it. I'm much better at my job now because of the things I learned while doing it. David Milch is one of the greatest writers, storytellers, directors, creative forces I've ever been around." He has been somewhat critical of his own performance: "Frankly, the show is much better than my performance ... Ian was like a little kid, playing with the props and playing with the language and he never lost the sense of fun of it all. I wasn't operating at that same level."

Also in 2006, he made a guest appearance in an episode of the NBC comedy My Name Is Earl. In 2007, Olyphant starred in the romantic comedy Catch and Release. He knew co-star Jennifer Garner from their days as struggling actors in New York, and was excited for the opportunity to play a romantic lead. Lael Loewenstein of Variety felt "Olyphant clearly has a bright future" while Desson Thomson of The Washington Post described him as "the strongest performer here" but that he was "entirely misplaced, an estimable actor caught in a thankless, frilly role". Scott Tobias of The A.V. Club remarked: "Olyphant's trademark volatility makes him a livelier romantic lead than the usual stuffed shirt." Similarly, Stephanie Zacharek of Salon found him "effective here precisely because he seems a little sharp and dangerous. He's not your typical cuddly romantic lead."

Olyphant's first post-Deadwood roles were the action movies Live Free or Die Hard and Hitman (both 2007). (Coastlines was first screened during the Sundance Film Festival in 2002 while Catch and Release was filmed in 2005.) He had bought a house in the weeks before Deadwood's cancellation and he later admitted his job choices during this period were for "purely financial reasons". In Live Free or Die Hard, he played a villainous cybersecurity expert. Both he and Bruce Willis have said his role was underwritten in the script, and he enjoyed working with Willis to develop the character. Peter Travers of Rolling Stone declared him "a master at smiling menace", while Mick LaSalle of The San Francisco Chronicle found him "perfectly ice cold". However, Manohla Dargis of The New York Times remarked: "Mr. Olyphant has many charms, but annihilating menace is not one of them." He next starred in Hitman, a video game adaptation, as the assassin Agent 47. He was hired to replace Vin Diesel six weeks before filming began and reluctantly agreed to shave his head. The film was commercially successful, grossing over $100 million, but received negative reviews. Todd McCarthy of Variety described Olyphant as "an actor capable of portraying subtle ambiguities and thought, which suggests he ought to branch out to play something other than baddies". Nick Schager of Slant Magazine was disappointed to see the actor "reduced to glowering and posing with pistols" while Manohla Dargis of The New York Times felt he was "strangely, at times ridiculously, miscast". In 2008, he had a supporting role as a lieutenant colonel in the Iraq War drama Stop-Loss, played a pompous newscaster in the little-seen comedy Meet Bill, voiced the character Cowboy in the video game Turok and made a guest appearance on the first season of the ABC sitcom Samantha Who? with Christina Applegate.

Olyphant had a new outlook when choosing his 2009 projects, influenced by his experience with Hitman: "It motivated me to take a little more responsibility with what I was doing ... I was very fond of the director and a lot of the people that worked on the film but there was definitely a part of me that was like, "What am I doing here?'" He starred as a morphine addict in the little-seen independent heist comedy High Life, with Derek Elley of Variety praising his "terrific" performance. He had a starring role in the thriller A Perfect Getaway as a possible serial killer of fellow holidaymakers in Hawaii. Manohla Dargis of The New York Times enjoyed "the regrettably underemployed" actor's performance, Ty Burr of The Boston Globe found him "delightfully confident" while Lisa Schwarzbaum of Entertainment Weekly noted he "has a heckuva good time telegraphing macho mania". He was nominated for the Toronto Film Critics Association Award for Best Supporting Actor. He returned to the stage for one night to appear in Standing on Ceremony: The Gay Marriage Plays, benefiting the Human Rights Campaign. Also in 2009, he appeared in 11 episodes of the FX legal thriller Damages, as a morally ambiguous love interest for Rose Byrne's character. Byrne later said he was her favorite Damages guest star, while FX president John Landgraf sent him the pilot script for another FX project, Lawman (later renamed Justified). In 2010, he starred as the town sheriff in the horror film The Crazies. Peter Bradshaw of The Guardian was impressed by the "saturnine screen presence of Timothy Olyphant – that formidable actor who deserves a lead role to match his potential." The Hollywood Reporter's Michael Rechtshaffen found him "convincing" while Claudia Puig of USA Today enjoyed the "smart, stoic and sympathetic" performance. He also appeared in the independent comedy Elektra Luxx (2010).

=== 2010–2015: Justified and comedic performances ===
Olyphant starred in FX's modern-day western series, Justified, as Deputy U.S. Marshal Raylan Givens, who is reassigned to his native Eastern Kentucky following a "Justified," but questionable, quick-draw shooting of a criminal in Miami. There, he encounters many outlaw figures from his childhood, including his father and Boyd Crowder, with whom he dug coal as a teenager. Olyphant was initially drawn to "the ease and the charm and the sort of old-fashionedness" of the character but has said he does not consider him a "good guy". The character of Raylan Givens was created by novelist Elmore Leonard, appearing in his short story "Fire in the Hole" (2001) and the novels Pronto (1993) and Riding the Rap (1995). Leonard was an executive producer of Justified and befriended Olyphant; his final novel, Raylan (2012), was inspired by the television show.

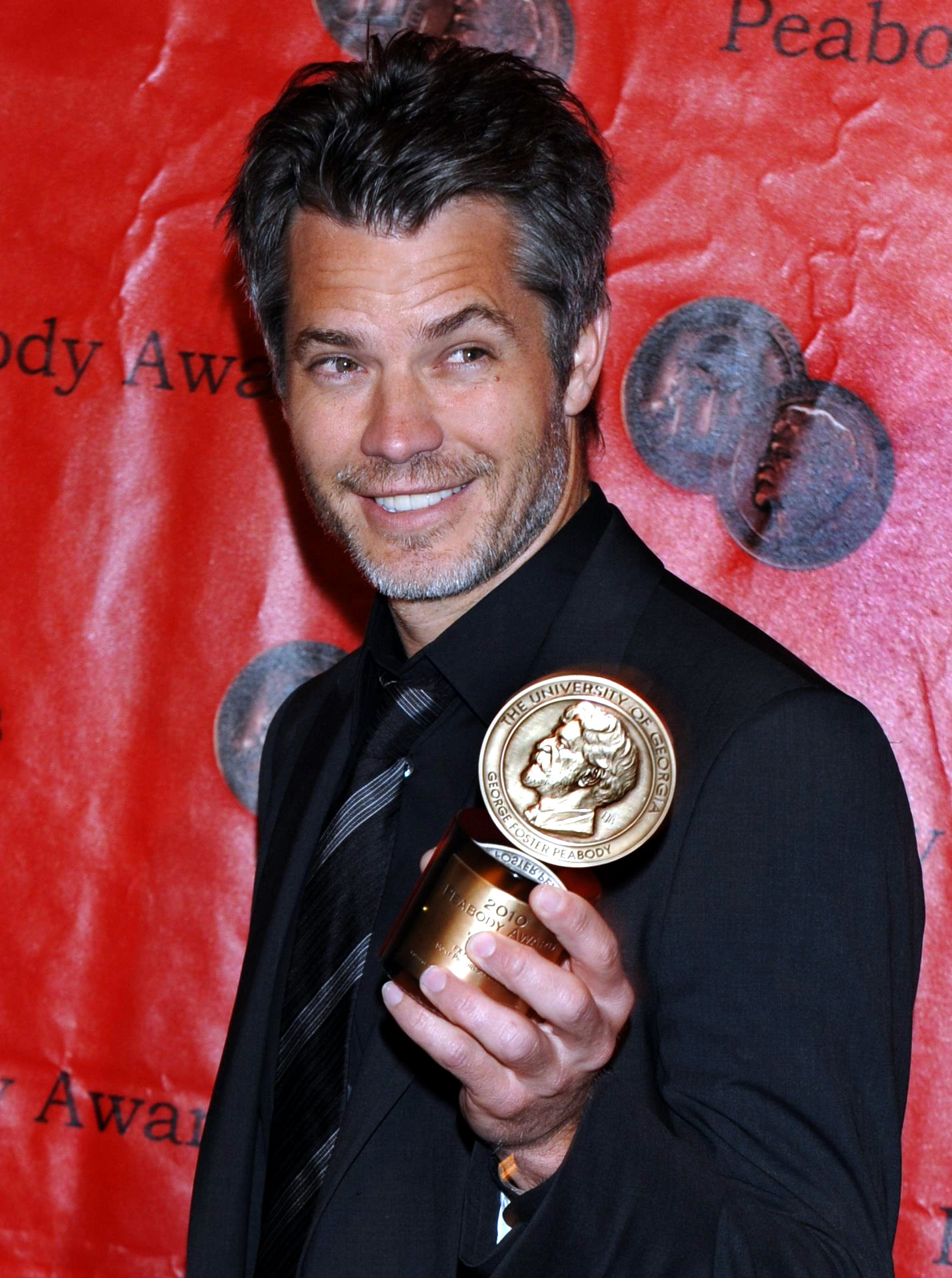
Olyphant at the 70th Annual Peabody Awards in May 2011

Raylan Givens has been described by many television critics as the "defining role" of Olyphant's career. Brian Lowry of Variety said it was "an unabashed star turn": "There are surely worse ways to be pigeonholed than playing tough, laconic lawmen, and Timothy Olyphant is carving himself a formidable niche in those confines ... It's an enormously appealing performance." Tim Goodman of the San Francisco Chronicle praised "an incredibly riveting performance": "Olyphant's steely gaze, Zen interior and matinee looks called to mind a younger Clint Eastwood." Daniel Fienberg of HitFix described him as "a tremendously compelling actor. It's not that he thrives only on minimalism, but he gets a lot out of a little. His performance is about potential energy, or potential violence. And Olyphant does "intense and coiled" to perfection." Matthew Gilbert of The Boston Globe said: "It's hard to imagine any other actor in the part, as Olyphant milks Raylan's smooth, laconic cowboy style for as much wry humor as he can. He is riveting without a lot of noise — both his body language and his conversation are pared down, and yet his presence is always resonant." Although Olyphant was nominated for a Primetime Emmy Award for Outstanding Lead Actor in a Drama Series in 2011, he and the show were often perceived to have been "snubbed" by Emmy voters. Matt Zoller Seitz of Vulture suggested this was because it was "the kind of performance that almost nobody recognizes as 'acting.' It's an old-fashioned movie hero performance in which much of the emotional action is internal and articulated with great subtlety." Similarly, Robert Bianco of USA Today commented that his "masterfully complete immersion in the role seems to have masked the talent expended playing it".

Olyphant also served as a co-executive producer on Justified, working with Graham Yost and the writing team on some of the show's storylines and coming to the set on his days off to work with guest stars. He has described producing as "the greatest thing about this job". Yost has said of his producer credit: "Often on shows that really doesn't mean much. On this show it actually doesn't reflect the depth of his involvement, which would be an even bigger credit. Tim is the biggest reminder for everyone that we're in the Elmore Leonard world. And that it needs to be funny and dark and twisted, and it needs to speak with all of those voices at the same time." Justified was awarded a Peabody Award in 2011.

Olyphant made occasional guest appearances on comedy television shows during Justified's six-season run. He played a paper salesman in two episodes of the NBC comedy The Office (2010), after Mindy Kaling, a writer, producer and actress on the show, pushed for him to make a guest appearance. In 2012, he played a character billed as White Sushi Chef in an episode of the FX sitcom The League (2012) and voiced a character in an episode of the FX animated series Archer. In 2013, he appeared as a love interest on the Fox comedy The Mindy Project. The guest appearance came about after he told Kaling that he wanted to appear on the show and he later said he would have been happy to play his middle-aged skateboarder character for "years".

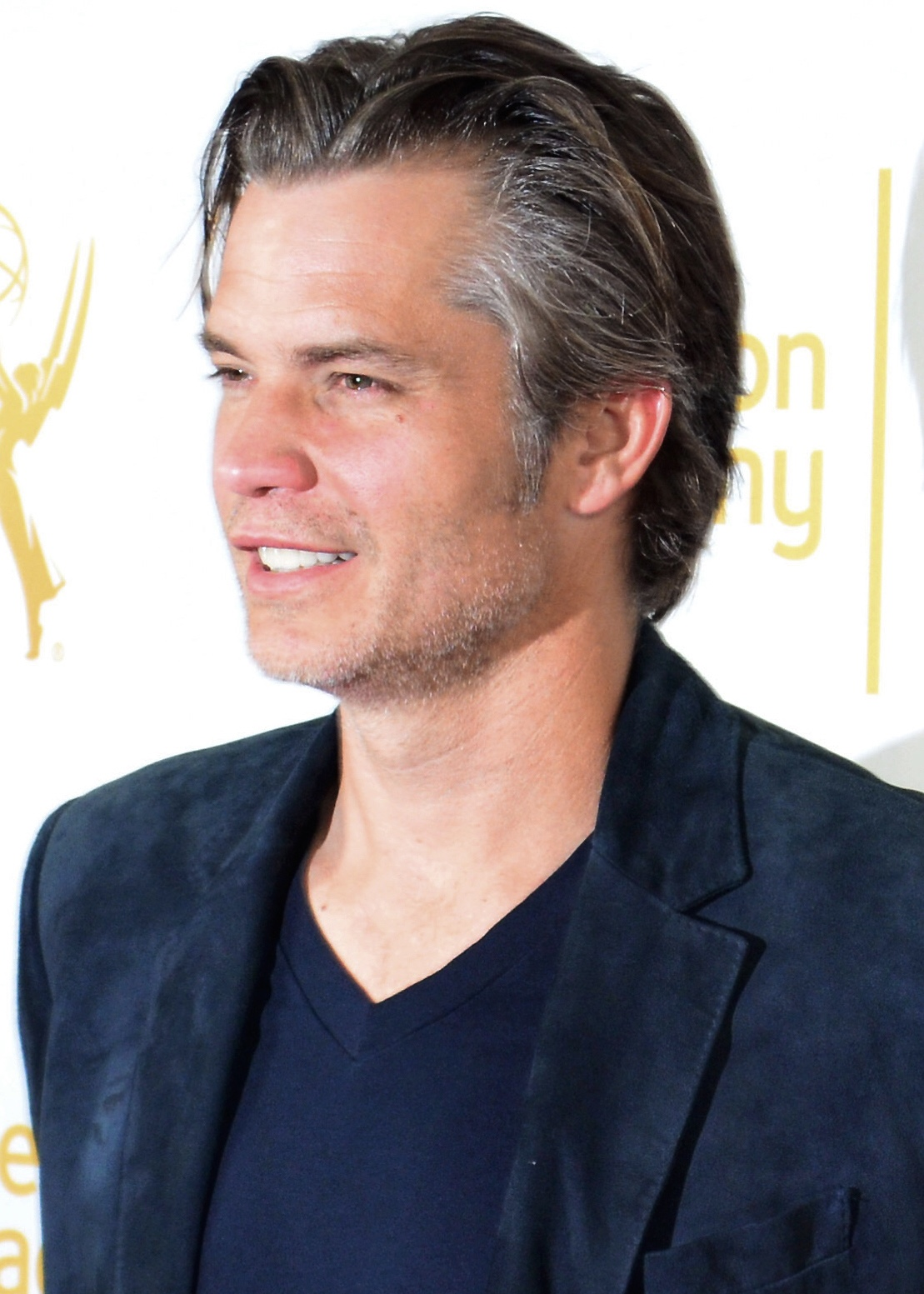
Olyphant in 2014

Olyphant also worked on numerous films in between seasons of Justified. He voiced the Spirit of the West in the animated film Rango (2011). The character was a parody of Clint Eastwood's Man with No Name and Olyphant was cast after director Gore Verbinski overheard him speaking on television: "I just sort of doubled back and looked through the door and was like, "That's our guy" ... Timothy has such a great quality to his voice." Olyphant appeared as a mentor to Alex Pettyfer's character in the science-fiction thriller I Am Number Four (2011). Justin Chang of Variety said he "brings some of his usual edge" but Betsy Sharkey of the Los Angeles Times felt he was "an untapped resource". Also in 2011, he voiced a character called Sergeant First Class "Grinch" in the video game, Call of Duty: Modern Warfare 3. In 2013, he appeared as Jeff Garlin's father in the independent comedy Dealin' with Idiots and took part in a one-off LACMA Live Read of the black comedy Raising Arizona (1987); he played Nicolas Cage's character while Amy Poehler played Holly Hunter's character. In 2014, Olyphant starred with Tina Fey in the ensemble comedy-drama This Is Where I Leave You. Their characters were teenage sweethearts until an accident left him with a mild brain injury. The film received mixed reviews, with David Edelstein of Vulture commenting: "Over the course of his career, Olyphant has given life to head-slappingly bad material, and he does it again by simply underplaying."

=== 2015–present: Santa Clarita Diet, Deadwood and Justified return ===
Olyphant had a recurring guest role as a fictionalized version of himself in the Fox comedy The Grinder (2015–2016). His performance received positive critical notices, with USA Today's Robert Bianco declaring it an "Emmy-deserving performance". The role won him the Critics' Choice Television Award for Best Guest Performer in a Comedy Series.

In early 2016, Olyphant starred in the world premiere of Kenneth Lonergan's comedy Hold On to Me Darling at the off-Broadway Atlantic Theater Company. His character, Strings McCrane, is a self-absorbed country singer and actor who returns home to Tennessee following his mother's death. Ben Brantley of the New York Times found him "entertainingly irritating" in a performance that "avoids the obvious route of histrionic posing"; "The startling, bona fide sorrow that Mr. Olyphant brings to [the final scene] truly illuminates everything that has come before." Frank Rizzo of Variety felt his performance was "a stunner, striking just the right notes of guilelessness, obliviousness and narcissism to make Strings one of the most appealing messes in a long time". David Rooney of The Hollywood Reporter felt the role "seems tailor-made for his laid-back swagger and sly humor ... Olyphant's natural charm ensures that Strings' unapologetic self-absorption remains more human than monstrous." He also played Henry, ex-husband of Sandy (Jennifer Aniston), in the universally-panned ensemble romantic comedy Mother's Day (2016); he appeared in Oliver Stone's Snowden (2016) as a CIA agent who befriends whistleblower Edward Snowden just prior to Snowden's fleeing to Russia, after publicly leaking classified US government information.

In February 2017, Olyphant began starring in the Netflix horror-comedy Santa Clarita Diet, and also served as an executive producer for the series, which co-starred Drew Barrymore. Netflix renewed the series for a second season in March 2017 and for a third, ultimately final season in May 2018. Dark Was the Night, an independent drama in which he starred with Marisa Tomei, was filmed in 2015 and premiered at the 2018 Galway Film Fleadh.

In early 2016, HBO announced that David Milch was developing a two-hour film continuation of Deadwood. The follow-up to the television series began production in October 2018. Deadwood: The Movie premiered on HBO on May 31, 2019.

In 2017, it was reported that Olyphant would play an FBI agent in the film Driven, though he ultimately did not appear in the film. In 2018, Olyphant was cast as a voice actor for the stop-motion animated film Missing Link, which was released in April 2019. He was also part of the large ensemble cast for the Quentin Tarantino semi-historical film Once Upon a Time in Hollywood, which was released in July 2019. Olyphant portrayed TV western star James Stacy in the film.

In 2020, Olyphant joined the Star Wars franchise when he appeared as Cobb Vanth in the second season of the Disney+ space Western The Mandalorian. In 2022, he reprised the role in the first season of The Mandalorian spinoff series The Book of Boba Fett.

Olyphant returned to the role of Raylan Givens in the 2023 miniseries Justified: City Primeval. On November 28, Deadline Hollywood revealed Olyphant has been cast as Kirsh in Noah Hawley’s upcoming Alien: Earth.

In 2026, Olyphant co-starred in the Apple TV limited series, Lucky, based on the novel of the same name by Marissa Stapley.

Olyphant also reunited with Jennifer Garner, his co-star from the film Catch and Release, for the 2026 Peacock romantic series The Five-Star Weekend. The series is based on the 2023 novel by Elin Hilderbrand.

== Personal life ==
Olyphant has been married to his college sweetheart Alexis Knief since 1991. They live in Westwood, Los Angeles, and have three children. His daughter Vivian plays his character's daughter on Justified: City Primeval.

From 2006 to late 2008, Olyphant was the sports reporter for Joe Escalante's morning radio show on Los Angeles' Indie 103.1; film director David Lynch served as the show's weatherman. Olyphant phoned the station every weekday, delivering his reports in an unconventional style. Following the station's demise, he joked: "If you know of anyone looking for sports reports from an actor who is often just going off of what he recalls happened yesterday, or reading it directly from the newspaper, then I'm your guy."

He is also a tennis player, and has participated in many pro-celebrity tournaments. He is a fan of the Los Angeles Clippers and the Los Angeles Dodgers, and he threw out the ceremonial first pitch at a Dodgers game in 2013.

== Filmography ==
Key
†	Denotes works that have not yet been released

=== Film ===
Year	Title	Role	Notes
1996	The First Wives Club	Brett Artounian	
1997	A Life Less Ordinary	Hiker	
1997	Ellen Foster	Roy Hobbs	
1997	Scream 2	Mickey Altieri	
1998	1999	Hooks	
1998	When Trumpets Fade	Lieutenant Terrence Lukas	
1999	No Vacancy	Luke	
1999	Go	Todd Gaines	
1999	Advice from a Caterpillar	Brat	
2000	The Broken Hearts Club	Dennis	
2000	Gone in 60 Seconds	Detective Drycoff	
2001	Head Over Heels	Michael	
2001	Auggie Rose	Roy Mason	
2001	Rock Star	Rob Malcolm	
2001	Doppelganger	Brian	Short film
2002	Coastlines	Sonny Mann	
2003	The Safety of Objects	Randy	
2003	Dreamcatcher	Pete Moore	
2003	A Man Apart	Jack "Hollywood Jack" Slayton	
2004	The Girl Next Door	Kelly	
2006	Catch and Release	Fritz Messing	
2007	Live Free or Die Hard	Thomas Gabriel	
2007	Hitman	Agent 47	
2008	Stop-Loss	Lt. Col. Boot Miller	
2008	Meet Bill	Chip Johnson	
2009	A Perfect Getaway	Nick Bennett	
2009	High Life	Dick	
2010	The Crazies	Sheriff David Dutten	
2010	Elektra Luxx	Dellwood Butterworth	
2011	Rango	The Spirit of the West	Voice
2011	I Am Number Four	Henri	
2013	Dealin' with Idiots	Max's Dad	
2014	This Is Where I Leave You	Horry Callen	
2016	Mother's Day	Henry	
2016	Snowden	CIA Agent Geneva	
2018	Dark Was the Night	Steven Lang	
2019	Missing Link	Willard Stenk	Voice
2019	Once Upon a Time in Hollywood	James Stacy	
2021	The Starling	Travis Delp	
2021	National Champions	Elliott Schmidt	
2022	Amsterdam	Tarim Milfax	
2025	Havoc	Vincent Crowley	
2026	Over Your Dead Body	Pete Bateson	
2026	The Further Mis-Adventures of Cliff Booth	James Stacy	

=== Television ===
Year	Title	Role	Notes
1996	Mr. & Mrs. Smith	Scooby	Episode: "Pilot"
1996–1997	High Incident	Brett Farraday	3 episodes
1998	Sex and the City	Sam	Episode: "Valley of the Twenty-Something Guys"
2002	Night Visions	Eli	Episode: "Harmony"
2004–2006	Deadwood	Sheriff Seth Bullock	36 episodes
2006	My Name Is Earl	Billy Reed	Episode: "Dad's Car"
2008	Samantha Who?	Winston Funk	Episode: "The Boss"
2009–2010	Damages	Wes Krulik	11 episodes
2010–2015	Justified	Raylan Givens	78 episodes; also executive producer
2010	The Office	Danny Cordray	3 episodes
2012	The League	Wesley	Episode: "The Freeze Out"
2013	Archer	Lucas Troy	Voice, episode: "The Wind Cries Mary"
2013	The Mindy Project	Graham Logan	Episode: "Sk8er Man"
2015–2016	The Grinder	Himself / Rake Grinder	4 episodes
2017–2019	Santa Clarita Diet	Joel Hammond	30 episodes; also executive producer
2019	Deadwood: The Movie	Seth Bullock	Also executive producer
2020	The Good Place	Himself	Episode: "You've Changed, Man"
2020	Curb Your Enthusiasm	Mickey	Episode: "You're Not Going to Get Me to Say Anything Bad About Mickey"
2020	Fargo	Dick "Deafy" Wickware	7 episodes
2020	The Mandalorian	Cobb Vanth	Episode: "Chapter 9: The Marshal"
2021	American Dad!	Nowell	Voice, episode: "Klaus and Rogu in Thank God for Loose Rocks: An American Dad! Adventure"
2021	Rick and Morty	U.S. Marine	Voice, episode: "Rick & Morty's Thanksploitation Spectacular"
2021	The Simpsons	Sheriff Flanders	Voice, episode: "A Serious Flanders"
2022	The Book of Boba Fett	Cobb Vanth	2 episodes
2022	The Great North	Wade	Voice, episode: "Beef's in Toyland Adventure"
2022	Bubble Guppies	Spotty Cackles	Voice, episode: "The Big Rig Bandit!"
2023	Daisy Jones & the Six	Rod Reyes	10 episodes
2023	Full Circle	Derek Browne	6 episodes
2023	Justified: City Primeval	Raylan Givens	8 episodes; also executive producer
2024	Tales of the Teenage Mutant Ninja Turtles	Goldfin	Voice, 4 episodes
2024	Terminator Zero	Terminator	Voice, 3 episodes
2025	Gremlins	Johnny Appleseed	Voice, episode: "Never Try the Cider"
2025	Number 1 Happy Family USA	Dan Daniels	Voice, 5 episodes
2025	Alien: Earth	Kirsh	7 episodes
2025–present	Stick	Clark Ross	5 episodes
2026	Lucky	John Armstrong	7 episodes
2026	The Five-Star Weekend	Jack Finnigan	6 episodes
2026	Life, Larry and the Pursuit of Unhappiness	Wyatt Earp	Episode: "Lincoln"

=== Video games ===
Year	Title	Role	Notes
2008	Turok	Cowboy	Voice and motion capture
2011	Call of Duty: Modern Warfare 3	Sergeant First Class "Grinch"	Voice and motion capture

=== Theatre ===
Year	Title	Role	Venue
1995	The Monogamist	Tim Hapgood	Playwrights Horizons
1996	The Santaland Diaries	Crumpet the Elf / David Sedaris	Atlantic Theater Company
1997	Plunge	Jim	Playwrights Horizons
2016	Hold On to Me Darling	Strings McCrane	Atlantic Theater Company

=== Podcasts ===
Year	Title	Role	Notes
2020	Hollywood & Crime: Season 6 -Billionaire Boys Club	Co-host	Wondery

== Awards and nominations ==
Year	Award	Category	Work	Result	Ref.
1996	Theatre World Award	Outstanding Debut Performance	The Monogamist	Won	
2000	Young Hollywood Award	Best Bad Boy	Go	Won	
2007	Screen Actors Guild Award	Outstanding Performance by an Ensemble in a Drama Series	Deadwood	Nominated	
2010	Toronto Film Critics Association Award	Best Supporting Actor	A Perfect Getaway	Nominated	
2010	Scream Award	Best Horror Actor	The Crazies	Nominated	
2010	IGN Summer Television Award	Best TV Hero	Justified	Nominated	
2011	IGN Summer Television Award	Best TV Hero	Justified	Nominated	
2011	Television Critics Association Award	Individual Achievement in Drama	Justified	Nominated	
2011	Satellite Award	Best Actor in a Series, Drama	Justified	Won	
2011	Online Film & Television Association Award	Best Actor in a Drama Series	Justified	Nominated	
2011	Genie Award	Best Performance by an Actor in a Leading Role	High Life	Nominated	
2011	Primetime Emmy Award	Outstanding Lead Actor in a Drama Series	Justified	Nominated	
2011	Critics' Choice Television Award	Best Actor in a Drama Series	Justified	Nominated	
2012	Critics' Choice Television Award	Best Actor in a Drama Series	Justified	Nominated	
2012	Satellite Award	Best Actor in a Series, Drama	Justified	Nominated	
2012	Online Film & Television Association Award	Best Actor in a Drama Series	Justified	Nominated	
2013	Online Film & Television Association Award	Best Actor in a Drama Series	Justified	Nominated	
2013	IGN Summer Television Awards	Best TV Hero	Justified	Nominated	
2013	Critics' Choice Television Award	Best Actor in a Drama Series	Justified	Nominated	
2013	TV Guide Award	Favorite Actor	Justified	Nominated	
2016	Critics' Choice Television Award	Best Guest Actor/Actress in a Comedy Series	The Grinder	Won	
2019	Primetime Emmy Award	Outstanding Television Movie (as executive producer)	Deadwood: The Movie	Nominated	
2019	Capri Hollywood International Film Festival	Best Ensemble Cast	Once Upon a Time in Hollywood	Won	
2020	Screen Actors Guild Award	Outstanding Performance by a Cast in a Motion Picture	Once Upon a Time in Hollywood	Nominated	
2021	Primetime Emmy Award	Outstanding Guest Actor in a Drama Series	The Mandalorian	Nominated	
2024	Critics' Choice Television Award	Best Actor in a Drama Series	Justified: City Primeval	Nominated	
