= Billy Postlethwaite =

English actor

William John Postlethwaite is an English actor.

== Early life and education ==
William John Postlethwaite is the son of actor Pete Postlethwaite and former BBC producer Jacqueline Morrish. He grew up in Shropshire.

He began training in acting at the London Academy of Music and Dramatic Art in 2008 and graduated in 2011.

== Career ==
Postlethwaite made his stage debut as Grigory in the John Hodge play Collaborators in 2011.

In 2017, he appeared in the Game of Thrones episode "Dragonstone", alongside singer Ed Sheeran, in a scene that received critical and fan backlash for Sheeran's cameo.

In 2018, he had a role in Tomb Raider, a film adaptation of the video game franchise. He also starred as Boris Stolyarchuk in the HBO miniseries Chernobyl and had a small role in Sam Mendes' 2019 war drama, 1917.

In 2021, Postlethwaite joined the cast of Beforeigners for its second season.

The actor took up the title role in Macbeth, in addition to the role of Lysander in A Midsummer Night's Dream for the Watermill Theatre. His performance as Macbeth received positive reviews by Judi Herman, writing for WhatsOnStage.com. Macbeth had previously been portrayed by Postlethwaite's father, in 1997.

== Filmography ==
=== Film ===
List of film appearances, with year, title, and role shown
Year	Title	Role	Notes
2015	Containment	Aiden	
2018	Tomb Raider	Bill	
2019	1917	PCO Harvey	
2023	Indiana Jones and the Dial of Destiny	Professor Donner	
2024	William Tell	The Wolfshot	

=== Television ===
List of film appearances, with year, title, and role shown
Year	Title	Role	Notes
2013	The Suspicions of Mr Whicher	Stephen Gann	1 episode
2014	Midsomer Murders	Noah Evans	1 episode
2015	Foyle's War	Nicholas Greenfield	1 episode
2017	Game of Thrones	Lannister Soldier	1 episode
2017–2018	Holby City	Fredrick Johansson	Recurring role, 11 episodes
2019	Father Brown	Edmund Noon	1 episode
2019	Chernobyl	Boris Stolyarchuk	Miniseries, 2 episodes
2021	The Great	The Sultan	1 episode
2021	Beforeigners	Isaac	4 episodes
2023	The Winter King	Cadwys	Main role, 6 episodes
2023–present	Silo	Hank	Recurring role (season 1); Main role (season 2–present); 22 episodes
