= Lucky (miniseries) =

2026 American television miniseries

- Genre: Crime thriller
- Created by: Jonathan Tropper
- Based on: Lucky by Marissa Stapley
- Showrunners: Jonathan Tropper; Cassie Pappas
- Starring: Anya Taylor-Joy; Annette Bening; Clifton Collins Jr.; Aunjanue Ellis-Taylor; Timothy Olyphant
- Music by: Isabella Summers
- Opening theme: "Horns of a Bull" by Fiona Apple
- Country of origin: United States
- Original language: English
- No. of episodes: 7

Production
- Executive producers: Reese Witherspoon; Lauren Neustadter; Jonathan Tropper; Cassie Pappas; Anya Taylor-Joy; Jonathan Van Tulleken
- Producers: Meredith L. Ditlow; Marissa Stapley
- Cinematography: Yaron Orbach; Doug Emmett
- Editors: Tyler L. Cook; Aika Miyake; Eleanor Infante; Byron Smith; Jennifer Barbot
- Running time: 39–48 minutes
- Production companies: Hello Sunshine; Tropper Ink; LadyKiller; J.V.T. Films; Apple Studios

Original release
- Network: Apple TV
- Release: July 15 – August 19, 2026

Lucky is an American crime thriller television miniseries created by Jonathan Tropper for Apple TV. It stars Anya Taylor-Joy, Annette Bening, Timothy Olyphant, and Aunjanue Ellis-Taylor with Reese Witherspoon and Cassie Pappas among the producers. Based on Marissa Stapley's 2021 novel, the series premiered on July 15, 2026, and ran for seven episodes, concluding on August 19.

== Premise ==
When a multimillion-dollar heist goes sideways, con artist Lucky (Taylor-Joy) is forced to go on the run. Pursued by both the FBI and a ruthless crime boss, Lucky must fight for her life — and a way out.

== Cast and characters ==
=== Main ===
- Anya Taylor-Joy as Luciana "Lucky" Armstrong
- Annette Bening as Priscilla Masterson, a dangerous mob boss, Cary's mother, and Lucky's mother-in-law
- Clifton Collins Jr. as Harris Dutch, Priscilla's enforcer
- Aunjanue Ellis-Taylor as Agent Billie Rand, an FBI agent determined to find Lucky and arrest her so she can take down Priscilla
- Timothy Olyphant as John Armstrong, Lucky's incarcerated father, and Cary's father-in-law

=== Recurring ===
- Mo McRae as Agent Eli Gates, Rand's partner
- Drew Starkey as Cary Masterson, Lucky's husband and Priscilla's son
- Eric Lange as Kershaw, Rand's supervisor
- William Fichtner as Wayne Whittaker, Priscilla's boss and Cary's biological father

=== Guest ===
- Dean Jagger as Agent Tom Mason
- Artur Zai Barrera as Agent Diego Cruz
- Alanna Ubach as Sylvia
- Matthew Rauch as Noah
- Nicole Chanel Williams as Asher
- Annie Tedesco as Sharon
- Malcolm McRae as Eric
- Jazmyn Simon as Alison
- Aadyn Encalarde as Dana
- Eugene Kim as Eddy
- Isaac Stephen Montgomery as Officer Davis

== Episodes ==
No.	Title	Directed by	Written by	Original release date
1	"No Shortcuts"	Jonathan Van Tulleken	Jonathan Tropper	July 15, 2026
Lucky and her husband Cary are celebrating in a Las Vegas suite after pulling off a successful heist. The next morning, Lucky awakens to discover that both Cary and their suitcase containing $10 million in cash are gone. FBI agent Billie Rand arrives at the casino, looking for Lucky and the missing money. Lucky tries to escape, but has to turn around when she spots Dutch, a mob enforcer also searching for her and the money. She escapes with a truck driver but is tracked to a truck stop. Just before an FBI agent can arrest her, he is struck by a car. Inside the car is Cary's mother, Priscilla, a mob boss newly released from prison, who interrogates Lucky about the money. When Lucky tells her Cary took it, she is thrown in the trunk and driven away. Lucky eventually escapes and causes the car to crash. One of Priscilla's henchmen is killed in the crash, and Lucky kills the other before fleeing into the desert.
2	"Make 'em Dance"	Greg Yaitanes	Hilary Bettis	July 15, 2026
Fleeing the car wreck on foot into the desert, Lucky is found by Lita, who lives in a remote home with her two grandchildren. Lucky tells her she was thrown out of a car by an abusive husband. Priscilla visits John in prison, asking his help in finding Lucky and Cary before both are killed by Whitaker, the gangster whose money they stole and is threatening to kill all of them. Agent Rand arrives at the car wreck and deduces that Lucky escaped and survived. As she tracks her to Lita's house, Lucky escapes in Lita's truck. She is found in a gas station by Dutch, Priscilla's henchman. She escapes again by hiding under a tarp in the back of Dutch's truck as he drives away.
3	"Read the Room"	Greg Yaitanes	Ariel Levine	July 22, 2026
4	"Too Close to See It"	Jet Wilkinson	Mark Stasenko	July 29, 2026
5	"Are We Bad People?"	Jet Wilkinson	Hilary Bettis & Mary Anthony	August 5, 2026
6	"Wherever You Go, There You Are"	Jonathan Van Tulleken	Jonathan Tropper & Kevin Rosen	August 12, 2026
7	"All Good Things"	Jonathan Van Tulleken	Cassie Pappas	August 19, 2026

== Production ==
The series was created by Jonathan Tropper and adapted from Marissa Stapley's novel of the same name. Tropper serves as co-showrunner alongside Cassie Pappas. It is produced by Apple Studios alongside Tropper Ink with executive producers including Reese Witherspoon and Lauren Neustadter for Hello Sunshine, part of Candle Media. Anya Taylor-Joy is an executive producer through her production banner Ladykiller and also leads the cast. In December 2024, Lucky was given a series order by Apple TV, and Jonathan Van Tulleken signed on to direct and executive produce. Annette Bening and Timothy Olyphant joined the cast in January 2025, Aunjanue Ellis-Taylor and Drew Starkey joined in February, Clifton Collins Jr. and Mo McRae in March, and lastly William Fichtner and Eric Lange rounded out the cast in April.

Filming began in Las Vegas in February 2025, also shooting in Los Angeles, and wrapped in July 2025. Fiona Apple and Amy Aileen Wood produced the series' title sequence track.

== Release ==
Lucky was released on Apple TV on July 15, 2026, with the first two episodes available immediately and the rest on a weekly basis until August 19.

== Reception ==
The review aggregator website Rotten Tomatoes reported a 78% approval rating based on 49 reviews, with an average of rating reviews of 6.9/10. The website's critics consensus reads, "Anya Taylor-Joy is Lucky in an entertaining bit of thrilling fare that often promises more than it can deliver but never lets the audience down when it comes to action and intrigue." Metacritic, which uses a weighted average, assigned a score of 68 out of 100 based on 29 critics, indicating "generally favorable" reviews.
