= Sky Box Sets =

- Country: New Zealand
- Broadcast area: National

Programming
- Picture format: 1080i (HDTV) 16:9

Ownership
- Owner: Sky Network Television

History
- Launched: 1 August 2017; 8 years ago

Links
- Website: https://www.sky.co.nz/discover/sky-entertainment

Availability

Streaming media
- Sky Go: skygo.co.nz

Sky Box Sets is a television channel owned and operated by New Zealand's Sky. It was launched on 1 August 2017 on Sky Channel 9 in 1080i high-definition. The channel screens an entire season of a television series at 7:30pm every evening.

The channel screens drama and comedy series such as Bellevue, American Gothic, Mary Kills People, Jane the Virgin, Fortitude, 11.22.63, and Outcast.
