= Cassie Pappas =

American dramatist

Cassie Pappas is an American television writer, screenwriter and playwright. She is best known for her work as co-showrunner and executive producer on the Apple TV crime thriller Lucky starring Anya Taylor Joy. The limited series premiered on July 15, 2026 with filming completed in Las Vegas and Los Angeles in July 2025.

Pappas has also written for the Apple TV dystopian drama Silo (TV series), the Netflix crime drama Griselda (miniseries), the FX drama series Tyrant and the Showtime series The L Word.

== Early life ==
Pappas played basketball at Mater Dei High School where they won two state championships. Pappas went on to play at Butler University in Indianapolis, IN before transferring to The University of Texas where she studied playwriting.

== Career ==
Some of Pappas' earlier writing credits include, Ride, a biopic about astronaut Sally Ride for Lionsgate. She wrote MGM's remake of the 1980s cult classic Road House starring Ronda Rousey. She also developed a limited drama series about a Texas female rodeo in the 1940s for Amazon produced by Joey Soloway (Transparent).

Other writing credits include the CBS drama Hostages and the MTV comedy Awkward. In 2011, she wrote Dreamhouse a single-camera comedy for Fox with 3 Arts Entertainment producing. The following year she penned 20s vs 30s, a semi-autobiographical comedy based on her relationship with her sister for ABC.

Pappas wrote and performed in the Off-Broadway production of Pieces (of Ass) at the New World Stages in New York and Raleigh Studios in Los Angeles. She also wrote and directed the play Colin Grey at The Kennedy Center American Theatre Festival.

== Filmography ==
Year	Title	Credited as		Notes
Year	Title	Writer	Executive producer	Notes
2011	Awkward	Yes	No	Wrote 2 episodes
2013	Hostages	Yes	No	Wrote: "The Good Reason"
2015	Tyrant	Yes	No	Co-wrote 2 episodes; also story editor
2016	The Catch	No	No	Executive story editor
2020	Interrogation	Yes	Consulting	Wrote "Det. Dave Russell vs Chris Keller 1983"
2023–24	Silo	Yes	Co-executive	Wrote 2 episodes
2024	Griselda	Yes	Co-executive	Co-wrote: "Rich White People"
2024	Road House	Uncredited	No	Additional literary material
2025	Back in Action	Uncredited	No	Additional literary material
2026	Lucky	Yes	Yes	Wrote: "All Good Things"
