= Reese's Book Club =

Book club run by Reese Witherspoon

Reese's Book Club is a celebrity book sales club run by Reese Witherspoon under her media company Hello Sunshine. Since its founding in 2017, the club has gained a reputation for boosting the careers of female authors such as Delia Owens, Celeste Ng, and Megan Miranda.

Hello Sunshine has been involved in the adaptation of several Reese's Book Club Picks into films and television series, including Little Fires Everywhere, Where the Crawdads Sing, and Daisy Jones & the Six.

== History ==
Reese's Book Club was founded in 2017 and operates under Witherspoon's media company Hello Sunshine, led by Chief Executive Officer Sarah Harden. Harden was appointed to the position in 2018, after serving as interim CEO beginning in June 2017.

Also in June 2017, Eleanor Oliphant Is Completely Fine by Gail Honeyman became the first book selected as a Reese's Book Club Pick. Since then, the club has highlighted a Book Club Pick every month, reportedly chosen by Witherspoon.

Reese's Book Club has gained a reputation for boosting the sales of its Book Club Picks. As of 2019, no Book Club Picks had sold fewer than 10,000 copies and novels selected as Book Club Picks reportedly outsell other fiction books by 700%.

In August 2020, Reese's Book Club announced that it would begin selecting a monthly young adult Book Club Pick, with the first YA selection being You Should See Me in a Crown by Leah Johnson.

=== Hello Sunshine Adaptations ===
Witherspoon's production company Hello Sunshine has optioned the film rights to several Book Club Picks, including Where the Crawdads Sing, Eleanor Oliphant Is Completely Fine, Little Fires Everywhere, Daisy Jones & the Six, Tiny Beautiful Things, and The Last Thing He Told Me.

=== Brand Partnerships ===
In April 2022, Reese's Book Club partnered with furniture company Havenly to create a line of home decor called "Reading Room."

== Controversy ==
=== Where the Crawdads Sing ===
Reese's Book Club faced criticism in July 2019 after it was reported that Mark Owens, the ex-husband of Delia Owens, author of Reese's Book Club Pick Where the Crawdads Sing, was possibly connected to a murder that took place in Zambia in 1995.

=== The Nightingale ===
Reese's Book Club was the subject of controversy following the announcement of its March 2023 Book Club Pick The Nightingale by Kristin Hannah. In a video posted to the Reese's Book Club Instagram page, Witherspoon explained that the novel, which tells the story of two women in German-occupied France during World War II, was chosen in response to rising antisemitism. Some criticized this choice, noting that the novel does not prominently feature any Jewish characters and was not written by a Jewish author.

== Book Club Picks ==
Reese's Book Club Picks
Year and Month "Picked"	Title	Author	Genre	Notes
November 2026	The Great Wherever	Shannon Sanders	historical fiction, literary fiction, magical realism	
October 2026	Sophie, Standing There	Meg Mason	contemporary fiction, literary fiction	
September 2026	Big Little Truths	Liane Moriarty	mystery, thriller,	sequel to Big Little Lies
August 2026	The Wild Beneath	Kelly Anderson	contemporary fiction, romance, magical realism	
July 2026	A Founding Mother: A Novel of Abigail Adams	Stephanie Dray and Laura Kamoie	historical fiction	
June 2026	A Pair of Aces	Marie Benedict and Victoria Christopher Murray	historical fiction	
May 2026	The Fine Art of Lying	Alexandra Andrews	contemporary fiction, thriller	
April 2026	Into the Blue	Emma Brodie	contemporary fiction, romance	
March 2026	Lady Tremaine	Rachel Hochhauser	fantasy, historical fiction	
February 2026	In Her Defense	Philippa Malicka	mystery, legal thriller	
January 2026	The First Time I Saw Him	Laura Dave	mystery, thriller	
December 2025	The Heir Apparent	Rebecca Armitage	contemporary fiction, domestic fiction	
November 2025	Wild Dark Shore	Charlotte McConaghy	mystery, thriller, eco-fiction	
October 2025				no selection this month
September 2025	To the Moon and Back	Eliana Ramage	contemporary fiction, literary fiction	
August 2025	Once Upon a Time in Dollywood	Ashley Jordan	romance, contemporary fiction	
July 2025	Spectacular Things	Beck Dorey-Stein	contemporary fiction, literary fiction	
June 2025	The Phoenix Pencil Company	Allison King	historical fiction, magical realism	
May 2025	Great Big Beautiful Life	Emily Henry	romance, contemporary fiction	
April 2025	All That Life Can Afford	Emily Everett	contemporary fiction, coming of age fiction	
March 2025	Broken Country	Clare Leslie Hall	historical fiction, romance, mystery	
February 2025	Isola	Allegra Goodman	historical fiction	
January 2025	The Three Lives of Cate Kay	Kate Fagan	contemporary fiction, mystery	
December 2024	City of Night Birds	Juhea Kim	literary fiction	
November 2024	We Will Be Jaguars	Nemonte Nenquimo	memoir	
October 2024	Society of Lies	Lauren Ling Brown	mystery, thriller	
September 2024	The Comfort of Crows: A Backyard Year	Margaret Renkl	essays, nature writing	100th Reese's Book Club pick
August 2024	Slow Dance	Rainbow Rowell	romance, contemporary	
July 2024	The Cliffs	J. Courtney Sullivan	historical fiction, domestic fiction, mystery	
June 2024	The Unwedding	Ally Condie	mystery	
May 2024	How to End a Love Story	Yulin Kuang	romance, contemporary fiction	
April 2024	The Most Fun We Ever Had	Claire Lombardo	contemporary fiction, literary fiction	
March 2024	Anita de Monte Laughs Last	Xochitl Gonzalez	historical fiction, magical realism	
February 2024	Redwood Court	DeLana R. A. Dameron	coming of age fiction, historical fiction	
January 2024	First Lie Wins	Ashley Elston	thriller	
December 2023	Before We Were Innocent	Ella Berman	coming of age fiction, thriller	
November 2023	Maybe Next Time	Cesca Major	fiction, romance, magical realism	
October 2023	Starling House	Alix E. Harrow	fantasy	
September 2023	Mother-Daughter Murder Night	Nina Simon	mystery, thriller	
August 2023	Tom Lake	Ann Patchett	fiction	
July 2023	Yellowface	R. F. Kuang	fiction, thriller, satire	
June 2023	Cassandra in Reverse	Holly Smale	science fiction	
May 2023	Did You Hear About Kitty Karr?	Crystal Smith Paul	historical fiction	
April 2023	Romantic Comedy	Curtis Sittenfeld	romance	
March 2023	The Nightingale	Kristin Hannah	historical fiction	
February 2023	The House of Eve	Sadeqa Johnson	historical fiction	
January 2023	The House in the Pines	Ana Reyes	thriller	
December 2022	The Marriage Portrait	Maggie O'Farrell	historical fiction, thriller	
November 2022	Tiny Beautiful Things	Cheryl Strayed	essays	adapted into a television series by Hello Sunshine
October 2022	Our Missing Hearts	Celeste Ng	dystopian fiction	
September 2022	On the Rooftop	Margaret Wilkerson Sexton	historical fiction	
August 2022	Wrong Place, Wrong Time	Gillian McAllister	mystery, science fiction	
July 2022	Honey & Spice	Bolu Babalola	romance	
June 2022	Counterfeit	Kirstin Chen	thriller	
May 2022	The Dictionary of Lost Words	Pip Williams	historical fiction	
April 2022	True Biz	Sara Nović	coming-of-age fiction	
March 2022	The Club	Ellery Lloyd	mystery	
February 2022	The Christie Affair	Nina de Gramont	historical fiction, romance	
January 2022	Honor	Thrity Umrigar		
December 2021	Lucky	Marissa Stapley	thriller	
November 2021	The Island of Missing Trees	Elif Shafak	historical fiction, romance	
October 2021	Sankofa	Chibundu Onuzu		
September 2021	L.A. Weather	María Amparo Escandón		
August 2021	We Were Never Here	Andrea Bartz	thriller	
July 2021	The Paper Palace	Miranda Cowley Heller	romance	
June 2021	Seven Days in June	Tia Williams	romance	
May 2021	The Last Thing He Told Me	Laura Dave	thriller	adapted into a television series by Hello Sunshine
April 2021	Northern Spy	Flynn Berry	thriller, historical fiction, spy fiction	
March 2021	Infinite Country	Patricia Engel	domestic fiction	
February 2021	The Sanatorium	Sarah Pearse	thriller	
January 2021	Outlawed	Anna North	western, historical fiction, alternate history fiction	
December 2020	The Chicken Sisters	KJ Dell'Antonia	domestic fiction, humor	
November 2020	Group	Christie Tate	memoir	
October 2020	His Only Wife	Peace Adzo Medie	domestic fiction, humor	
September 2020	The Last Story of Mina Lee	Nancy Jooyoun Kim	thriller, mystery, historical fiction	
August 2020	Everything Inside	Edwidge Danticat	short stories	
June/July 2020	I'm Still Here	Austin Channing Brown	memoir	
June/July 2020	The Guest List	Lucy Foley	thriller, mystery	
May 2020	The Henna Artist	Alka Joshi	historical fiction	
April 2020	Untamed	Glennon Doyle	memoir	
March 2020	The Jetsetters	Amanda Eyre Ward		
February 2020	The Scent Keeper	Erica Bauermeister	magical realism, coming of age fiction	
January 2020	Such a Fun Age	Kiley Reid	coming of age fiction, domestic fiction	
December 2019	Conviction	Denise Mina	mystery	
November 2019	The Giver of Stars	Jojo Moyes	historical fiction	
October 2019	Fair Play	Eve Rodsky	self-help	
September 2019	The Secrets We Kept	Lara Prescott	historical fiction, spy fiction, thriller, romance	
August 2019	The Last House Guest	Megan Miranda	mystery, thriller	
July 2019	Whisper Network	Chandler Baker	mystery	
June 2019	The Cactus	Sarah Haywood	romance, humor	
May 2019	From Scratch	Tembi Locke	memoir	adapted into a television series by Hello Sunshine
April 2019	The Night Tiger	Yangsze Choo	historical fiction, magical realism	
March 2019	Daisy Jones & The Six	Taylor Jenkins Reid	historical fiction	adapted into a television series by Hello Sunshine
February 2019	The Proposal	Jasmine Guillory	romance	
January 2019	The Library Book	Susan Orlean	true crime, memoir	
December 2018	One Day in December	Josie Silver	romance	
November 2018	The Other Woman	Sandie Jones	thriller	
October 2018	This Is How It Always Is	Laurie Frankel	domestic fiction	
September 2018	Where the Crawdads Sing	Delia Owens	historical fiction, mystery	adapted into a 2022 film by Hello Sunshine
August 2018	Still Lives	Maria Hummel	mystery, thriller	
July 2018	Next Year in Havana	Chanel Cleeton	historical fiction, romance	
June 2018	Something in the Water	Catherine Steadman	thriller	
May 2018	You Think It, I'll Say It	Curtis Sittenfeld	short stories	
April 2018	Happiness	Heather Harpham	memoir	
March 2018	Erotic Stories for Punjabi Widows	Balli Kaur Jaswal		
February 2018	The Light We Lost	Jill Santopolo	romance	
January 2018	Braving the Wilderness	Brené Brown	self-help	
December 2017	The Last Mrs. Parrish	Liv Constantine	thriller	
November 2017	This Is the Story of a Happy Marriage	Ann Patchett	essays	
October 2017	The Rules of Magic	Alice Hoffman	historical fiction, magical realism, fantasy	prequel to Practical Magic
September 2017	Little Fires Everywhere	Celeste Ng	domestic fiction	adapted into a television series by Hello Sunshine
August 2017	The Lying Game	Ruth Ware	thriller	
July 2017	The Alice Network	Kate Quinn	historical fiction, spy fiction	
June 2017	Eleanor Oliphant Is Completely Fine	Gail Honeyman	humor, romance	

Reese's Book Club YA Picks
Date "Picked"	Title	Author
Summer 2025	Stuck Up & Stupid	Angourie Rice & Kate Rice
Spring 2025	Heiress Takes All	Emily Wibberley & Austin Siegemund-Broka
Winter 2024	Throwback	Maurene Goo
Fall 2024	Looking For Smoke	K.A. Cobell
Summer 2024	Twelfth Knight	Alexene Farol Follmuth
Winter 2022	Anatomy	Dana Schwartz
Fall 2021	Within These Wicked Walls	Lauren Blackwood
Late Summer 2021	The Downstairs Girl	Stacey Lee
Summer 2021	Tokyo Ever After	Emiko Jean
Spring 2021	Firekeeper's Daughter	Angeline Boulley
Winter 2021	You Have a Match	Emma Lord
December 2020	The Light in Hidden Places	Sharon Cameron
November 2020	A Cuban Girls Guide to Tea & Tomorrow	Laura Taylor Namey
October 2020	Fable	Adrienne Young
September 2020	Furia	Yamile Saied Méndez
August 2020	You Should See Me in a Crown	Leah Johnson
