= Portsmouth High School, Southsea =

Portsmouth High School
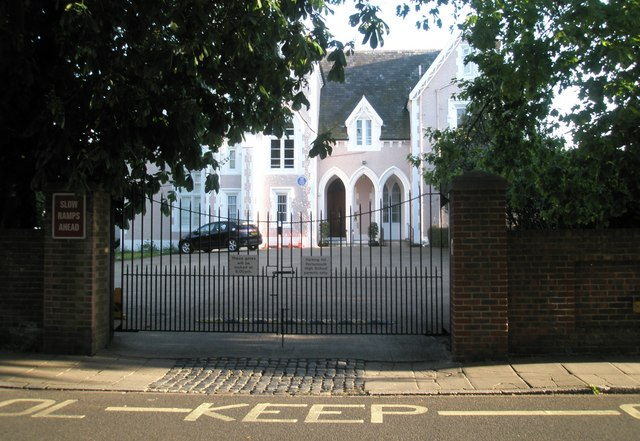
- Entrance to the school

Location
- Kent Road; Southsea, Hampshire, PO5 3EQ; England; 50.788°N 1.094°W

Information
- Type: Private day school
- Established: 1882
- Founder: Girls' Public Day School Trust
- Chairman of Governors: Krysia Butwilowska
- Headmistress: Sarah Parker
- Gender: Girls
- Age: 4 to 18
- Enrolment: ~500
- Houses: Dolphin, Warrior, Nelson, Vernon at Prep School. Gaskell, Austen, Bronte, Eliot at Senior School.
- Colours: Maroon and gold
- Affiliation: Girls' Day School Trust
- Former Students' Association: GDST Alumnae via the School
- Website: http://www.portsmouthhigh.co.uk/

Portsmouth High School is a private day school for girls in Southsea, a district in the southern coastal city of Portsmouth, England. Founded by the Girls' Public Day School Trust in 1882, it is one of the Trust's smaller schools.

The Good Schools Guide described the school as "a super no-frills choice: big enough to appeal to almost any girl, but not at the expense of the personal touch".

== History ==
Portsmouth High School was founded by the Girls' Public Day School Trust (now the Girls' Day School Trust) in 1882. The school moved to its present premises on Kent Road in Southsea in 1885, when the building was opened by Princess Louise. Dovercourt, the house built and lived in by the Southsea architect Thomas Ellis Owen, was acquired for the Junior School in 1927. During World War II the school was evacuated to two country houses in Hampshire, Hinton Ampner (Junior Pupils) and Adhurst St Mary (Senior Pupils), and became a boarding school for six years. After the war, the school became a direct grant grammar school under the Education Act 1944 and became independent during the mid-1970s when the scheme was abolished.

== Structure ==
Portsmouth High School is split into 4 principal sections: A Pre-School for 3-4 year olds, a Prep School for 4-11 year olds (reception to year 6), a Senior School for 11-16 year olds (year 7 to year 11) and Sixth Form (year 12-13). The Pre-School and Prep School are based at 36 Kent Road, Southsea while the Senior School and Sixth Form are based at 25 Kent Road, Southsea.

Portsmouth High School structured its years into a house system. In the Prep School there are four houses: Dolphin, Warrior, Nelson and Vernon while in the Senior School there were another set of four houses: Gaskell, Austen, Bronte and Eliot. The school organises regular inter-house competitions such as House Music and whole school Sports Days.

== Portsmouth Politics Society ==
After the announced closure of the nearby St John's College in May 2022, it was announced in June 2022 that the long-running St John's Politics Society would be transferring to Portsmouth High School and rebranding itself as the "Portsmouth Politics Society". All meetings originally planned for the rest of 2022 are still scheduled to take place at the High School with their original dates and times and the intention is that future meetings will carry on as they have done.

Before transferring to Portsmouth High School, the Politics Society was founded in 1977 at St John's College by Bernard Black (1934-2013) who was Head of Political Studies there from 1977 to 1999. Speakers over the years have included political big names such as former Prime Minister Margaret Thatcher, former Prime Minister Harold Wilson, Tony Benn, former Archbishop of Canterbury Rowan Williams, Douglas Hurd, former leader of UKIP and Reform UK Nigel Farage, former Foreign Secretary Jack Straw, former leader of the Green Party of England and Wales Caroline Lucas, former Prime Minister and former Home Secretary Theresa May, former Lord Chief Justice Lord Judge, former Director of Liberty Shami Chakrabarti, US Ambassador to the UK Matthew Barzun and former President of the Supreme Court Lord Neuberger.

== Notable former pupils ==
- Lucy Foley, author of The Guest List and The Paris Apartment
- Samantha Davies, yachtswoman
- Kirsty Dillon, actress
- Nancy Edwards, Professor of Medieval Archaeology
- Anjana Gadgil, BBC reporter and presenter
- Meg Hillier, Labour MP for Hackney South and Shoreditch
- Rachel Lloyd, sex trafficking abolitionist and founder of Girls Educational and Mentoring Services
- Sarah McCarthy-Fry, politician
- Gemma Spofforth, Olympic swimmer
- Dr. Frances Saunders, Senior Civil Servant and scientist
- Jane Collins, chief executive, Marie Curie Cancer Care
- Charlotte Jackson British journalist and television presenter
- Margaret Rock (1903–1983), Bletchley Park codebreaker
- Dame Mary Donaldson, the first woman Sheriff of the City of London and then in 1983 was elected Lord Mayor. She was appointed GBE in 1983 Mary Donaldson, Baroness Donaldson of Lymington
- Denise Black, actress
