= Pacific Avenue Historic District (Santa Cruz, California) =

Former historic district in California

- Formerly listed on the U.S. National Register of Historic Places
- U.S. Historic district
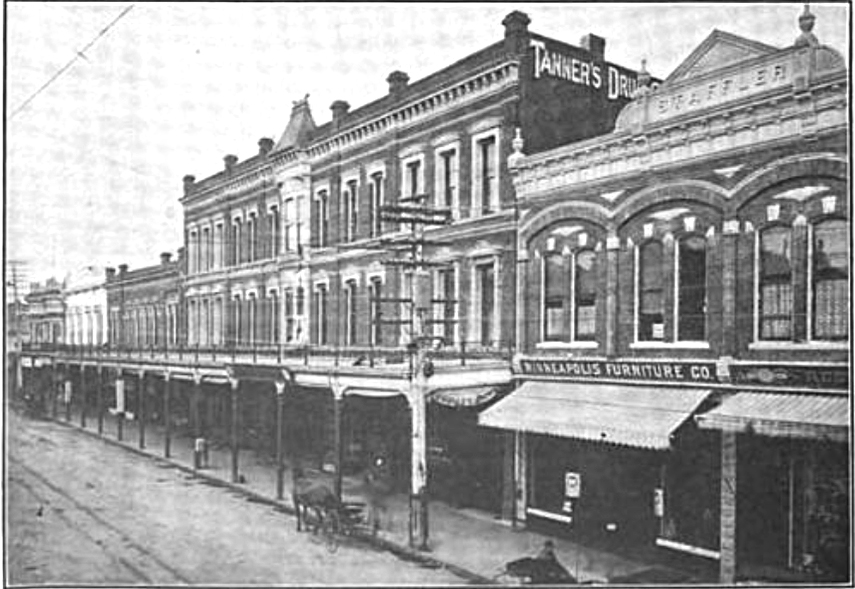
- Pacific Avenue (1903)
- Location: Roughly bounded by Pacific Ave., Water, Front, and Cathcart Streets, Santa Cruz, California, U.S.
- Area: 200 acres (81 ha)
- NRHP reference No.: 87000004 (withdrawn)

Significant dates
- Added to NRHP: February 4, 1987
- Removed from NRHP: April 21, 1992

Pacific Avenue Historic District (1987–1992) was a former historic district and is the location of a downtown commercial area in Santa Cruz, California. It was removed from the National Register of Historic Places after the destruction of majority of contributing properties during the 1989 Loma Prieta earthquake.

== History ==
It had an area of 200 acres (81 ha) and contained thirty-six contributing buildings. The contributing buildings had been built between 1890 and 1929, ten of which were built in 1890.

In 1848, Elihu Anthony bought the land south of Water Street between Front Street and the San Lorenzo River. He built the first business in that part of town at North Pacific, Water, and Mission streets, and he sold the rest of the lots. Within a couple of years, commerce grew on Front Street (site of the former Pacific Avenue Historic District).

One of the most notable buildings in the district was the Cooper House, a former county courthouse designed in the Richardsonian Romanesque style. In the 1970s and 1980s, the Cooper House housed a collection of small businesses and was a popular hangout and place to hear music and get food. The Cooper House was destroyed in the 1989 earthquake and the site is now Abbott Square Market.

The Pacific Avenue Historic District was removed from the National Register of Historic Places after the destruction of majority of contributing properties during the 1989 Loma Prieta earthquake, after which nineteen of thirty-six contributing buildings were demolished.

Pacific Avenue Historic District

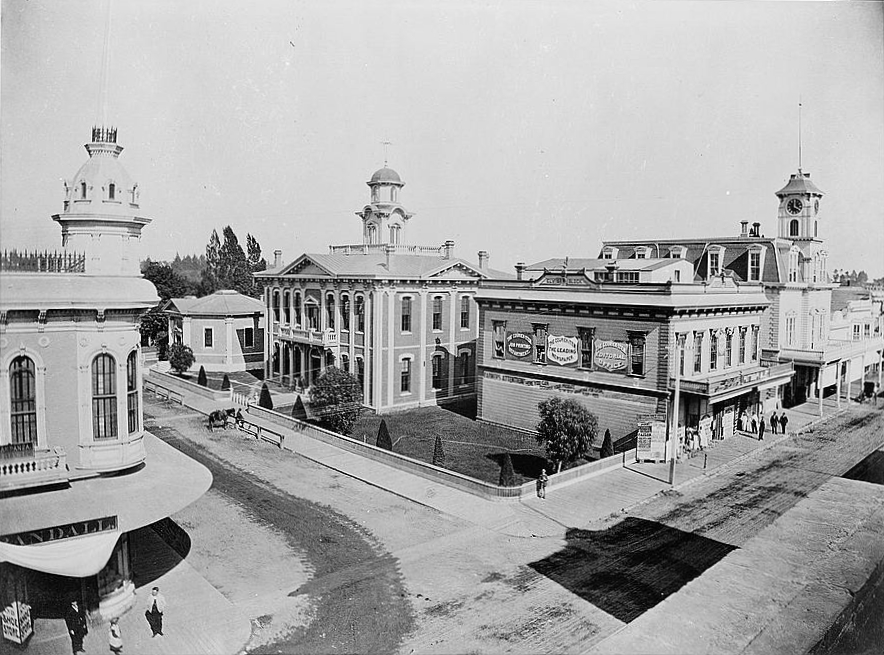
1890s with the Octagon Building and the 1866 county courthouse

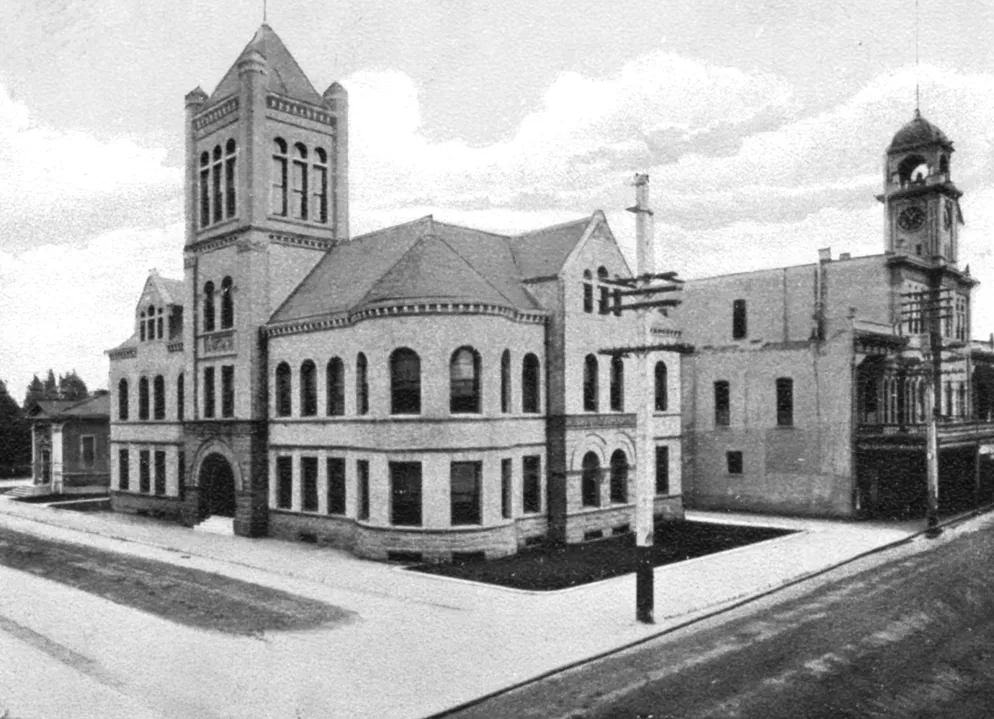
Cooper House or Cooper Courthouse

== List of notable sites and structures ==
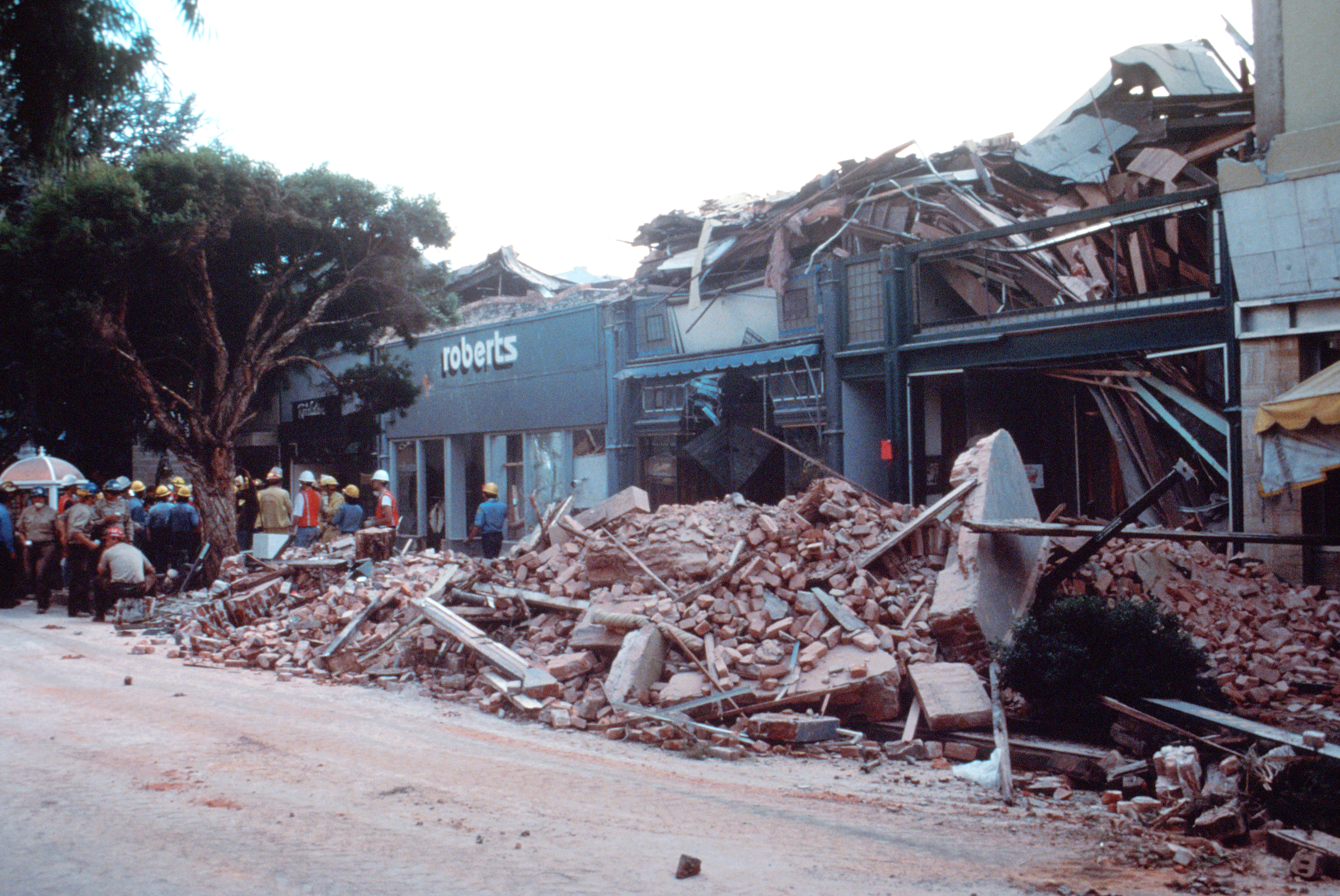
After the 1989 Loma Prieta earthquake in the Pacific Avenue Historic District

- Hihn Building (1894, rebuilt 1994) 1205 Pacific Avenue; mixed use
- Leonard Building (1894) corner of Front and Cooper Streets; mixed use
- Octagon Building (1882), corner of Front and Cooper Streets; now owned by Santa Cruz Museum of Art and History
- U.S. Post Office (1936) 850 Front Street

=== Destroyed or modified ===
- Cooper House (c. 1906), corner of Front and Cooper Streets; served as county courthouse, destroyed in 1989, now the site of Abbott Square Market
- Pacific Garden Mall (1969) Pacific Avenue; destroyed in 1989
- St. George Hotel (1897) Pacific Ave; lobby was destroyed in 1955 when the San Lorenzo River flooded, now a series of retail shops including Santa Cruz Bookstore
- Theatre Del Mar (1936) 1124 Pacific Avenue; cinema closed in 1999

== See also ==
- National Register of Historic Places listings in Santa Cruz County, California
