= Julia Bartz =

Julia Bartz may refer to:

- Julia Obermeier, née Bartz, German politician
- Julia Bartz (writer), American clinical therapist and writer.
