= Pacific Avenue Historic District =

Pacific Avenue Historic District may refer to:

- Pacific Avenue Historic District (Santa Cruz, California), formerly listed on the National Register of Historic Places in Santa Cruz County, California. Majority of contributing properties destroyed by the 1989 Loma Prieta earthquake
- Pacific Avenue Historic District (Tacoma, Washington), formerly listed on the National Register of Historic Places in Pierce County, Washington
