= The Last Thing He Told Me (TV series) =

2023 thriller television series

- Promotional poster
- Genre: Mystery thriller; Drama
- Based on: The Last Thing He Told Me by Laura Dave
- Developed by: Laura Dave & Josh Singer
- Starring: Jennifer Garner; Angourie Rice; Aisha Tyler; Augusto Aguilera; Nikolaj Coster-Waldau; David Morse
- Music by: Danny Bensi; Saunder Jurriaans
- Country of origin: United States
- Original language: English
- No. of seasons: 2
- No. of episodes: 15

Production
- Executive producers: Reese Witherspoon; Lauren Neustadter; Jennifer Garner; Josh Singer; Laura Dave; Merri D. Howard; Daisy von Scherler Mayer; Aaron Zelman
- Cinematography: Michael McDonough; Daryn Okada; Evans Brown; Sasha Spahn
- Editors: Trevor Baker; Tamara Meem; Nathan Easterling; Connor Davis; Byron Smith; Garret Price
- Running time: 36–55 minutes
- Production companies: Parnes Bakery Inc.; Hello Sunshine; 20th Television

Original release
- Network: Apple TV+
- Release: April 14 – May 19, 2023
- Network: Apple TV
- Release: February 20, 2026 – present

The Last Thing He Told Me is an American mystery thriller television series for Apple TV+, based on the 2021 novel by Laura Dave. The series was developed by Laura Dave and Josh Singer and stars Jennifer Garner as Hannah Hall. It premiered on April 14, 2023. A second season premiered on February 20, 2026.

== Premise ==
The series follows Hannah Hall, who forms an unexpected relationship with her stepdaughter as she searches for her husband who recently disappeared.

== Cast and characters ==
=== Main ===
- Jennifer Garner as Hannah Hall
- Angourie Rice as Bailey Michaels / Kristin, Hannah's stepdaughter
- Aisha Tyler as Jules Nichols (season 1), Hannah's best friend who is a journalist
- Augusto Aguilera as Grady Bradford (season 1; recurring season 2)
- Nikolaj Coster-Waldau as Owen Michaels / Ethan Young
- David Morse as Nicholas Bell (season 2; special guest star season 1), Owen's former father-in-law and Bailey's grandfather who is a lawyer to a mafia organization known as the Campano family

=== Recurring ===
- John Harlan Kim as Bobby Park (season 1), Bailey's boyfriend before going on the run
- Geoff Stults as Jake Davis, Hannah's ex-fiancé who is a lawyer
- Josh Hamilton as Charlie Smith, Bailey's maternal uncle and Nicholas' son
- Judy Greer as Quinn Favreau (season 2), Bailey's biological mother's best friend and Frank's daughter
- Michael Galante as Gas Man #2 / Jimmy (season 2)
- John Noble as Frank Campano (season 2), the head of a criminal organization in Austin, Texas
- Luke Kirby as Teddy Campano (season 2), Frank's son who is determined to have Owen killed
- Elizabeth O'Donnell as Ed (season 2), Grady's colleague who is involved with a man who killed Grady

=== Special guest stars ===
- Rita Wilson as Carol (season 2), Hannah's estranged mother who lives in Arizona

== Production ==
=== Development ===
Ahead of its May 4, 2021, release, the novel The Last Thing He Told Me was optioned by Hello Sunshine and Red Om Films. Soon after, in partnership with 20th Television, Hello Sunshine and Red Om Films put the project on the marketplace. Apple, in a highly competitive bidding war, won the project and gave it a straight-to-series order. Laura Dave, author of the novel, wrote the adapted screenplay with her husband, Josh Singer. Olivia Newman directed the series pilot, with Deniz Gamze Ergüven, Daisy Von Scherler Mayer, and Lila Neugebauer directing the other episodes. In March 2024, Apple TV+ renewed the series for a second season.

=== Casting ===
In January 2021, Julia Roberts was announced in a lead role for The Last Thing He Told Me. In November 2021, Jennifer Garner replaced Roberts as star and producer. Angourie Rice was added to the cast in April 2022, with Nikolaj Coster-Waldau, Aisha Tyler, Geoff Stults, John Harlan Kim and Augusto Aguilera joining in May.

=== Filming ===
Filming for the series began on May 3, 2022. The setting for the story is the houseboat community of Waldo Point Harbor in Sausalito, California, and some location shooting for the series was carried out there, as well as in nearby areas of downtown Sausalito and Marin Headlands. Other shooting locations include Los Angeles and Austin, Texas.

== Episodes ==
=== Series overview ===
Season	Episodes	Originally released		
Season	Episodes	First released	Last released	Network
1	7	April 14, 2023	May 19, 2023	Apple TV+
2	8	February 20, 2026	April 10, 2026	Apple TV

=== Season 1 (2023) ===
No. overall	No. in season	Title	Directed by	Written by	Original release date	Prod. code
1	1	"Protect Her"	Olivia Newman	Laura Dave & Josh Singer	April 14, 2023	1GZL01
In Sausalito, California, successful woodturner Hannah Hall is married to Owen Michaels, who works at a software startup called The Shop. Hannah is happily married, but struggles to connect with her teenage stepdaughter, Bailey. When The Shop is raided by the FBI for fraud, Owen disappears, but he has a note sent to Hannah with the words "PROTECT HER". Owen also leaves a note for Bailey along with a bag of money. Hannah wants to believe that Owen was ignorant of the fraud, but their reporter friend Jules believes it unlikely, because he was unsurprised when she warned him that the raid was going to happen. Hannah feels that their house is being watched. A US Marshal warns Hannah that Owen is not who she thought he was.
2	2	"The Day After"	Olivia Newman	Laura Dave & Josh Singer	April 14, 2023	1GZL02
Hannah makes Bailey go to school over her protests, where Bailey's boyfriend Bobby is the only one to support her. Hannah is approached by FBI agents who are surprised when she tells them that she talked to a US Marshal named Grady Bradford. Grady's number has an Austin area code, and Hannah's further investigation suggests that Owen had a past in Austin. Hannah contacts Jake, a lawyer ex-boyfriend, for legal advice, and he engages a private investigator to dig into Owen's history. Bailey feels that someone broke into their house, but Hannah doesn't think that anything is missing. Grady secretly trails after Hannah, but misses her when she takes Bailey on an early flight out to Austin.
3	3	"Keep Austin Weird"	Deniz Gamze Ergüven	Jamie Rosengard	April 21, 2023	1GZL03
Hannah and Bailey follow Bailey's vague childhood memories of Austin to a church where she and Owen once attended a wedding. However, the church has no records of a wedding during the period that matches Bailey's history. The Shop's security officer, who has been watching Hannah's house, tries to break in but he is stopped by Grady. Grady breaks into the house himself and finds the bag of money. Following a password hint on Owen's laptop, Hannah asks Jules to check Bailey's piggybank; Jules does, and finds a key inside. Jake tells Hannah that there is no record of Owen and Bailey Michaels existing prior to their arrival in Sausalito.
4	4	"Witness to Your Life"	Deniz Gamze Ergüven	Harris Danow	April 28, 2023	1GZL04
A confused Hannah tells Bailey about how her father changed their identities. Hannah and Bailey track down Owen's former math professor, Tobias Cookman, who helps them narrow down Owen's possible identities. The church from the previous day contacts Hannah with a correction, for there was a wedding in the correct time period between Charles Smith and Andrea Reyes. While searching Owen's class yearbook, Hannah and Bailey find a photo of Katherine Smith, who looks very similar to Bailey. At Hannah's instruction, Jules looks for the bag of money, but it is missing. Hannah tells Jules to look for a safe in her workshop that might match the piggy bank key. Grady tells his boss about the Michaels case, and voices his concern that Hannah and Bailey are in danger.
5	5	"The Never Dry"	Daisy von Scherler Mayer	Isaac Gómez	May 5, 2023	1GZL05
Hannah and Bailey find the Never Dry, the Smiths' family bar. Hannah meets the bar's owner Charlie Smith, who confirms that he is Katherine's brother, and that Katherine died some time ago. When Hannah shows Charlie a picture of Owen, Charlie reacts angrily; Bailey intervenes, and Charlie calls her "Kristin". Hannah and Bailey are chased by Charlie, but escape. Bailey recalls another memory that confirms that Katherine was her mother. Grady receives Owen's cellphone in the mail, which contains records of how Owen tried to prevent the Shop's fraud. Jules and Jake inform Hannah that they found Owen's safe, which contains a will stating that his name was Ethan Young. Owen/Ethan's late wife's father, Nicholas Bell, was a lawyer for the powerful Campano mob family, and after Katherine was killed in a possible hit, Owen turned State's evidence that brought down the Campanos' key members. Hannah readies to leave Austin but Bailey is missing. Grady finds Hannah and calls a search for Bailey.
6	6	"When We Were Young"	Lila Neugebauer	Erica Tavera & Allegra Caldera	May 12, 2023	1GZL06
Bailey tracks down her aunt Andrea Reyes, who tells her about her family and the reasons Owen took her away. Grady tells Hannah that she and Bailey have to go into witness protection, as the Campanos are likely to target them as leverage to flush Owen out of hiding. Grady returns the bag of money to Hannah and advises her to use it, which is clean and must have been prepared by Owen for this purpose. Hannah has doubts if witness protection would be sufficient, as there is a leak in the US Marshals' office. Additionally, the move would uproot Bailey's life, which Hannah believes Owen tried to avoid by leaving in the first place. Nicholas and Grady both go to Andrea's house to pick up Bailey, but Grady gets there first. Hannah sneaks out of the US Marshals' office and finds Charlie, with the request that she wants to speak to Nicholas directly.
7	7	"Sanctuary"	Olivia Newman	Laura Dave & Josh Singer	May 19, 2023	1GZL07
Charlie sends Hannah to Nicholas' house. Hannah makes Nicholas an offer: she and Bailey will not go into witness protection, and she will allow Bailey to reconnect with her grandfather and extended family, if Nicholas can guarantee their safety from the Campanos. Hannah accepts that this protection can never extend to Owen, who must remain on the run. Owen calls Bailey to apologize, and Bailey understands that she may never see him again. Grady advises Hannah and Bailey against trusting Nicholas, but Bailey chooses to follow Hannah. They return to their lives in Sausalito, aware that they are being watched by the mob. Five years later, Hannah and Bailey's relationship has improved, with Bailey calling Hannah "mom". At an exhibit for her woodwork, Hannah briefly crosses paths with a disguised Owen, who whispers that he still loves her.

=== Season 2 (2026) ===
No. overall	No. in season	Title	Directed by	Written by	Original release date	Prod. code
8	1	"Cape Cod"	Daisy von Scherler Mayer	Aaron Zelman	February 20, 2026	2GZL01
Hannah and Bailey have formed a good relationship with Nicholas and his family, but Hannah refuses to acknowledge Nicholas' old boss, Frank Campano, who still wants Owen killed. Despite Hannah's reservations, Bailey meets Quinn Favreau, who was Katherine's best friend and is Frank's daughter, to learn more about Katherine. Owen has been living in Houston gathering intel on the Campano family with Grady's help, in the hopes of returning to Hannah and Bailey. Owen goes to Hannah's exhibit and gives her a necklace. Two men attempt to kidnap Hannah, but she escapes by enacting a pre-prepared plan with Bailey. They contact Charlie, who tells them that Nicholas just died of a heart attack and "everything has changed". Grady arrives to meet Hannah and Bailey.
9	2	"Safe"	Sylvain White	Adam Stein	February 27, 2026	2GZL02
Grady tells Hannah and Bailey that Owen is gathering information from Nicholas' office that documents the Campano's relationship with an international narcotics syndicate, and that they are to wait at the motel for him to arrive. Grady's tense behavior makes Hannah and Bailey uneasy, so they leave without telling him. Campano men arrive at the motel just afterward, as the pair were spotted earlier by informants. Bailey, angered by Owen's making decisions on their behalf, takes Hannah to visit Quinn, and they ask her to tell Frank that they have nothing to do with Owen. Quinn calls her brother, Teddy, believing him responsible for hunting Hannah and Bailey, and tells him to stop. Hannah finds a tracker in the necklace Owen gave her but leaves it there, allowing Owen to come after them.
10	3	"Reunion"	Miguel Arteta	Lisa Long	March 6, 2026	2GZL03
Hannah and Bailey go to the house of Hannah's estranged mother, Carol. Owen finds them there and explains his plan to take down the Campanos. Hannah and Bailey are happy to see Owen, but have difficulty forgiving him for leaving them. Hannah makes Owen promise that moving forward all decisions will be made collectively. Bailey calls her boyfriend using a burner phone, and Teddy's men intercept the call and trace their location. When Teddy's men approach Carol's house, Hannah, Bailey and Owen leave and put Bailey's burner on a train as a decoy. Grady has an informant among Teddy's men, but he is captured while surveilling Teddy. Teddy questions Grady about Owen's whereabouts.
11	4	"Ghosts"	Jude Weng	Allegra Caldera	March 13, 2026	2GZL04
As Grady is uncontactable, Hannah goes to his office and learns from US Marshal Maris Anderson that Grady's Campano operation is unsanctioned. Hannah and Bailey are found by Teddy's men, but are saved by Charlie's people who have been following them. Hannah and Bailey are brought to the Never Dry where Nicholas is hiding, having faked his death after surviving a poisoning, which Charlie believes Frank is responsible for. Owen goes to Grady's house and finds Grady's body, his death made to look like a drug overdose. Owen calls Maris to tell her to investigate Grady's storage unit that has been emptied by the Campanos. At Hannah's urging, Charlie holds a wake for Nicholas, to lure out Frank. Hannah confronts Frank, who is brought to Nicholas and claims he didn't know about the poisoning. After the Campanos leave, Owen enters the Never Dry with a gun.
12	5	"First-Date Material"	Mikkel Nørgaard	Jean Kyoung Frazier	March 20, 2026	2GZL05
After an argument between Owen and Nicholas, the group travel to Nicholas' house to stay hidden. Hannah suspects that Frank is ignorant of Teddy's actions, and suggests they find evidence of it in order to negotiate with Frank. Owen and Hannah learn that a Campanos container is en route to Marseille and decide to go there to intercept it, despite Bailey's misgivings. Bailey learns from Quinn that Katherine and Owen had a massive fight just before Katherine died. Grady's former partner, Ed Buckley, realizes her boyfriend Jimmy works for the Campanos and reports it to Maris. During the operation to apprehend Jimmy, Maris shoots him. Frank questions Teddy, who claims that Jimmy poisoned Nicholas without his knowledge. This prompts Frank to investigate their business books.
13	6	"The Prosecutor"	Daisy von Scherler Mayer	Tom Smuts	March 27, 2026	2GZL06
Frank questions Maris, who has been secretly working for the Campanos, about Teddy's handling of the business, but she dismisses his concerns. At Marseille-Fos Port Hannah and Owen get into Teddy's container but find money instead of drugs. Owen takes some of the money and plants a bug, allowing him and Hannah to listen in to Teddy calling Quinn for help, which Quinn refuses. Bailey learns that Katherine met US Attorney Ivan Escarra before she died, and that she may have been compiling evidence against the Campanos in order to protect Nicholas and Owen. Bailey shares this information with Nicholas, who is distraught that his friendship with Frank may have been the reason Katherine died. Nicholas decides to go to Paris with Bailey, as Frank will be there for his birthday.
14	7	"Isia Moriendo Renascor"	Sylvain White	Chandler Smidt	April 3, 2026	2GZL07
Nicholas and Bailey are reunited with Hannah and Owen in Paris. The group suspect Quinn is more involved in the family business than she appears, and decide to use the stolen money to negotiate. Teddy is under pressure to deliver the syndicate's money and sends his men to catch Hannah and Owen, but they elude him. Hannah talks to Quinn, who tells her that protecting Owen is impossible and to return the money by the end of the day. Nicholas meets Frank to share his suspicions about Teddy, and advises him to retake control of the business. Frank follows Nicholas' advice and demotes Teddy, though Teddy insists that he didn't kill Katherine. A syndicate assassin attempts to shoot Teddy but Frank protects him and dies in his place.
15	8	"Souvenirs d'enfance"	Daisy von Scherler Mayer	Aaron Zelman & Adam Stein	April 10, 2026	2GZL08
Quinn takes control of the family business and arranges an alternative solution with the syndicate. Hannah, Owen and Bailey find Nicholas' documents that would implicate himself and the Campanos. Hannah returns half the money to Quinn and tries to use Nicholas' documents as a threat, but Quinn refuses to negotiate as she blames Owen for everything that's happened to her family. Bailey, remembering a childhood memory, questions Quinn about Katherine's death, and Quinn admits that she was responsible — she knew Katherine was talking to Ivan, and arranged a driver to scare her, but Katherine was killed by accident when trying to save Bailey. Bailey forgives Quinn and asks her to let her grudge against Owen go. Quinn allows Hannah, Owen, Bailey and Nicholas to return home freely, but she later calls Maris about "loose ends" that need tying up.

== Release ==
The Last Thing He Told Me premiered on April 14, 2023, with the first two episodes available instantly and the rest debuting on a weekly basis until May 19 on Apple TV+. The second season premiered on Apple TV on February 20, 2026.

== Reception ==
On the review aggregator website Rotten Tomatoes, the first season a 41% approval rating based on 34 critic reviews. The website's critics consensus reads, "Jennifer Garner's sensitive performance brings some heart to the proceedings, but monotonous pacing and a glossy veneer keep this mystery from standing out from the pack." Metacritic, which uses a weighted average, assigned a score of 49 out of 100 based on 19 critics, indicating "mixed or average reviews". The show reached 4.5 million unique viewers in its first 31 days of streaming.

The second season has a 56% approval rating on review aggregator Rotten Tomatoes based on 9 critic reviews.
