= Megan Miranda =

American writer

- Education: Massachusetts Institute of Technology
- Occupation: Author
- Spouse: Luis Miranda
- Children: 2
- Writing career
- Genre: Mystery fiction

Megan Miranda is an American author of mystery and suspense novels for young adult and adult readers. Her novels All the Missing Girls and The Last House Guest were both New York Times bestsellers and Reese's Book Club Picks.

== Career ==
Miranda attended the Peddie School. She earned a degree in biology from the Massachusetts Institute of Technology in 2002 and worked in the field of biotechnology before becoming a high school science teacher.

In 2012, Miranda published her first novel, Fracture, about a teenager who awakens from a coma after a near-death experience and finds herself able to predict people's deaths. She has since published more than a dozen other novels, including the New York Times bestsellers All the Missing Girls and The Last House Guest.

All the Missing Girls was Miranda's first novel for adults.

Miranda reportedly uses spreadsheets to plan the plots of her novels.

== Private life ==
Growing up, Miranda lived in New Jersey and spent time at her grandparents' house in the Poconos.

Miranda lived in Davidson, North Carolina as of July 2023. She has two children and is married to Luis Miranda.

== Bibliography ==
Several of Miranda's adult novels, including All the Missing Girls and The Last House Guest, were published by Simon and Schuster. Several of her young adult novels were published by Penguin Random House and Bloomsbury Publishing.

=== Young adult ===
- Fracture (2012)
- Hysteria (2013)
- Vengeance (2014, sequel to Fracture)
- Soulprint (2015)
- The Safest Lies (2016)
- Fragments of the Lost (2019)
- Come Find Me (2019)

=== Adult ===
- All the Missing Girls (2012)
- The Perfect Stranger (2017)
- The Last House Guest (2019)
- The Girl from Widow Hills (2020)
- Such a Quiet Place (2021)
- The Last to Vanish (2023)
- The Only Survivors (2023)
- Daughter of Mine (2024)
- You Belong Here (2025)
