= Sarah Pearse =

English author

- Born: Sarah Victoria Pearse; Torbay, England
- Education: University of Warwick; Falmouth University
- Years active: 2012–present
- Spouse: James Arnold
- Children: 2

Sarah Victoria Pearse is an English author. Her debut thriller novel The Sanatorium (2020), the first in a trilogy, became a #1 Sunday Times bestseller and a New York Times bestseller.

== Early life ==
Pearse was born in the Torbay area of Devon. She attended Oldway Primary School in Paignton and Torquay Girls' Grammar School. She graduated from the University of Warwick with a Bachelor of Arts (BA) in English literature and Creative Writing. She went on to study Broadcast Journalism at Falmouth University.

== Career ==
Before becoming a full-time writer, Pearse worked in PR. During maternity leave, she began writing short stories, which were published in Mslexia and Litro Magazine. She named Agatha Christie, Tessa Hadley, Michel Bussi, and Michelle Paver as influences.

In 2019, in a two-book deal, Transworld acquired the rights to publish Pearse's debut novel The Sanatorium in 2020. The Swiss Alps-set thriller, written over the course of two years, introduces detective Elin Warner during her stay at the fictional Le Sommet hotel and was inspired by Pearse's time living in Crans-Montana, where she learned about the history of local sanatoriums. The Sanatorium on The Sunday Times bestseller list before climbing to #1, made the top 10 of the New York Times bestseller list, was a Reese's Book Club pick and Waterstones Thriller of the Month, and won Crime Book of the Year at the 2022 FingerPrint Awards. This was followed by a sequel The Retreat, set at a luxury island retreat off the coast of Devon on the site of a former school, in 2022.

Pearse then signed a two-book deal with Sphere Books in April 2023, through which she published the trilogy's third and final installment The Wilds in 2024, in which Elin searches for a missing artist in a Portuguese national park. Regarding the topic of abuse covered in The Wilds, Pearse collaborated with the charity Refuge. As of October 2024, the Detective Elin Warner trilogy had reached £1.5 million in sales.

== Personal life ==
Pearse lives with her husband and their two daughters in Devon.

== Bibliography ==
=== Detective Elin Warner ===
- The Sanatorium (2020)
- The Retreat (2022)
- The Wilds (2024)

=== Short stories ===
- "Fishing in the Dump" in Mslexia Issue 56 (2012)
- "Helmikku" in Litro Magazine (2013)
- "Paddle" in Dear Damsels (2017)
