= We Were Never Here =

2021 novel by Andrea Bartz

First edition

We Were Never Here is a New York Times bestselling mystery and thriller novel by author Andrea Bartz. It is Bartz's third novel, and it debuted on August 3, 2021, published by Ballantine and written in the first-person narrative. The novel follows Emily and her friend Kristen as their backpacking trip has deadly consequences—with an eerily similar to a trip the pair took the previous year. Throughout the novel, Emily must confront her friendship with Kristen and the secrets they keep from each other and those around them.

== Synopsis ==
Best friends Emily and Kristen Czarnecki are vacationing in Chile on their annual reunion trip. On their last night in the country, Emily returns to find the body of a backpacker named Paolo, a man who Kristen was talking to at a local bar. Kristen claims that she killed him out of self-defense, as he was trying to rape her. This reminds Emily of a trip the two of them took last year to Cambodia, when another backpacker, Sebastian, sexually assaulted and attacked Emily and also wound up dead.

When Emily returns home to Wisconsin and Kristen returns home to Australia, Emily tries to bury her trauma with work at a company that sells organic cat food. She also vows to distance herself from Kristen. This plan is derailed when Kristen arrives for a surprise visit and Emily learns through news coverage that Paolo's body was found and that he was the son of wealthy Americans. Eventually Emily begins to realize that Kristen killed Paolo in the hopes that a shared trauma would bring them closer together and that she is obsessed with Emily. When she learns that Emily wants nothing to do with her, Kristen tries blackmailing Emily with photographic evidence. Emily attempts to briefly flee to Arizona with her boyfriend, but Kristen shows up on their trip. Meanwhile, police have released a sketch of their murder suspect (a woman that looks like Kristen), as well as news that Paolo was drugged before he was killed, confirming Emily's suspicions that Kristen was lying about it being self-defense. Emily also uncovers disturbing facts about Kristen's history, including the fact that she was institutionalized following the suicide of her best friend from childhood named Jamie Rusch.

Ultimately Kristen manages to get Emily alone and near a cliff face. Emily realizes that while Kristen killed Paolo, she herself killed Sebastian. With this in mind, she tries to push Kristen off the cliff. This fails, however Emily's boyfriend arrives at the last moment and hits Kristen with his car, causing them both to go over the cliff. Aaron survives the fall and Emily confesses all that has happened. He helps her get a lawyer, who is able to keep the police from building a successful case against Emily.

== Reception ==
The novel peaked at number three on The New York Times fiction bestseller list, number 10 on the USA Today bestseller list, and number five on the Publishers Weekly bestseller list. We Were Never Here was the August pick for Reese Witherspoon's monthly book club. It was also the August pick for the Marie Claire Book Club. The book was on The Washington Post's beach-reads list on August 21, and The New York Times crime columnist, Samira Sedira, said the book "skillfully examines toxic friendship at its most extreme."

BuzzFeed called the novel a "hauntingly suspenseful thriller."
