= Nina Simon =

American writer and museum curator

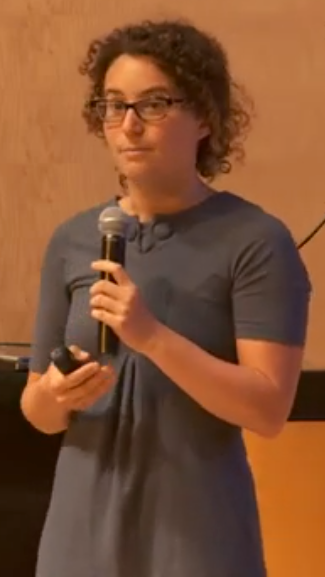
- Giving a talk at the San Francisco Public Library in 2015
- Born: July 15, 1981 (age 45)
- Education: Worcester Polytechnic Institute
- Occupations: Curator, writer, educator, museum director

Nina Simon (born 1981) is an American exhibition curator, writer, educator, and museum director. She is the founder of the non-profit organization OF/BY/FOR ALL. Simon previously was the executive director of the Santa Cruz Museum of Art & History, from 2012 until June 2019. She is the author of three books: The Participatory Museum, The Art of Relevance, and, in 2023, her first novel, Mother-Daughter Murder Night, which was a New York Times bestseller and Reese Witherspoon Book Club pick.

Her work has been shared in the Wall Street Journal, New York Times, NPR, and TEDx. She resides in Santa Cruz, California.

== Early life and education ==
Nina Simon was born July 15, 1981. Simon holds a B.S. degree from Worcester Polytechnic Institute in electrical engineering and mathematics.

== Career ==
During the majority of her career, Nina has worked as an independent consultant and exhibition designer with an expertise in social technology, gaming, and participatory design. During this time she worked with over one hundred museums and cultural centers around the world. In addition to her professional work, she has served on advisory committees for IMLS and AAAS projects concerning the future of museums and libraries.

Nina is known for her work as an author and public speaker. Over the years she has spoken to a multitude of audiences about her participatory audience and programming philosophy. Most notably, she has appeared on TEDx, and was the Keynote Speaker at the 2012 AFTA/National Arts Marketing Project Conference.

Previously, Nina has held the position of Curator at the Tech Museum of Innovation in San Jose, California and was the Experience Development Specialist at the International Spy Museum in Washington, DC. She was the executive director of the Santa Cruz Museum of Art and History from 2012 until June 2020. She also worked as an adjunct professor at The University of Washington Museology Program, where she taught a course on Social Technologies in Exhibition Design.

In addition, she is the principal of a design firm called Museum 2.0, which works internationally with museums, libraries, and cultural institutions to create educational programs and audience-driven exhibitions. She also authors the Museum 2.0 blog which reaches around 16,000 readers weekly and writes a column in Museum Magazine. Nina is currently a board member of The Center for the Future of Museums. Nina Simon on building community organizations OF, BY & FOR ALL.

== Awards and accomplishments ==
- American Alliance for Museums’ Nancy Hanks Memorial Award (2012)
- Among the 50 most “powerful and influential people in nonprofit arts” (Western States Arts Federation, 2012 and 2013)
- Described as a Museum Visionary by Smithsonian Magazine for her audience-centered approach to design
- Awarded an Ashoka Fellowship in 2019
- Santa Cruz Chamber of Commerce "Woman of the Year" for 2017

== Publications ==
- —— (2016). The Art of Relevance. Museum 2.0. ISBN 9780692701492. OCLC 964064946.
- —— (2010). The Participatory Museum. Jennifer Rae Atkins (contribution). Santa Cruz, California: Museum 2.0. ISBN 9780615346502. OCLC 780992997.
- —— (2023). Mother-Daughter Murder Night. HarperCollins. ISBN 9780063315068.

Simon is also the author of the Museum 2.0 blog.
