= Leah Johnson (writer) =

American writer

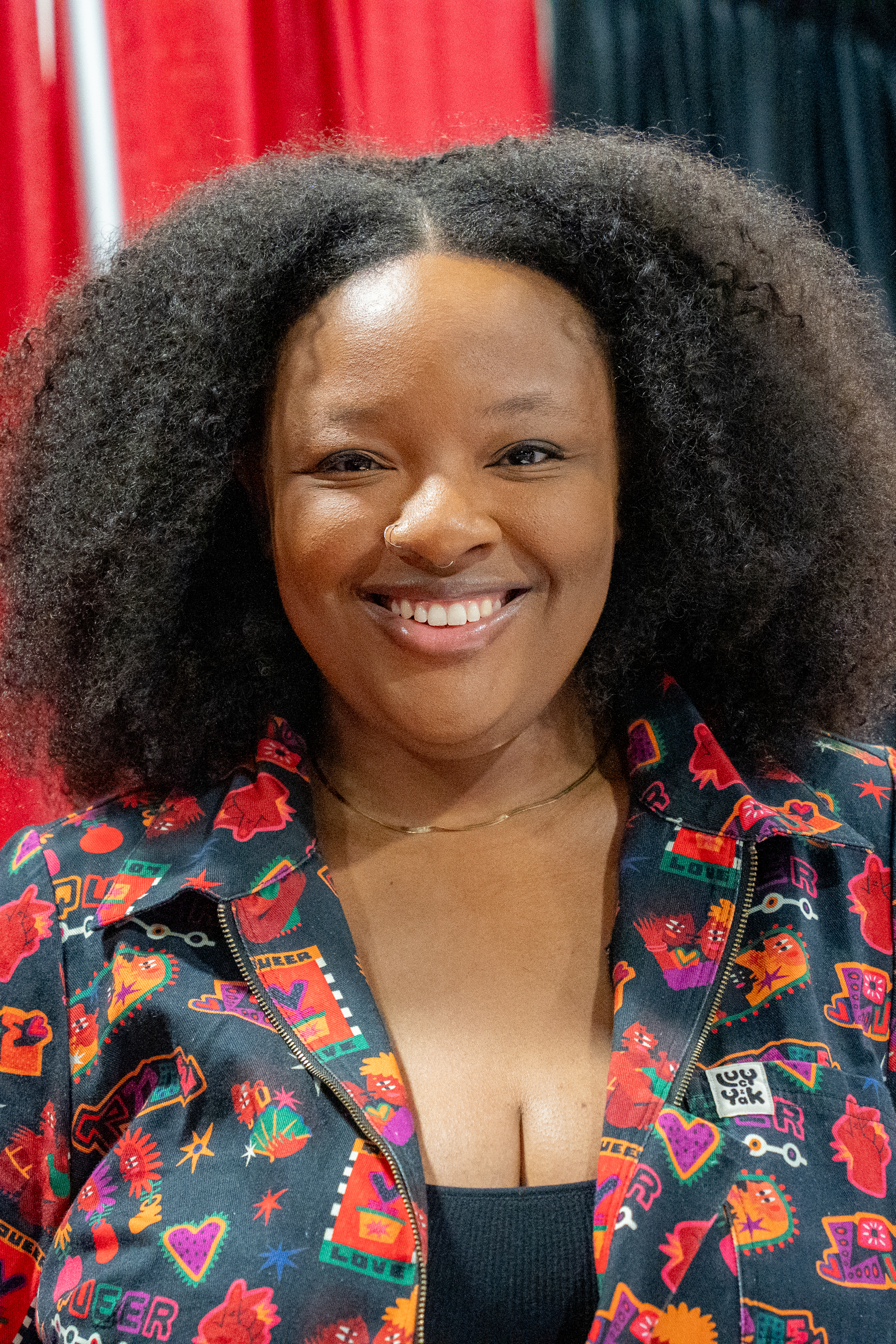
- Johnson at the National Book Festival 2025
- Born: July 5, 1994 (age 32)
- Education: Indiana University Bloomington (BA); Sarah Lawrence College (MFA)
- Occupation: Writer
- Writing career
- Language: English
- Years active: 2018–present
- Genres: young adult, middle grade fiction
- Notable work: You Should See Me in a Crown (2020)
- Notable awards: Stonewall Book Award Honor (2021); Indiana Authors Awards Young Adult Literature (2022)
- Website: www.byleahjohnson.com

Leah Johnson (born 1994) is an American writer and businesswoman. Her debut novel You Should See Me in a Crown (2020) received critical acclaim, including a Stonewall Book Award Honor. She is the author of Rise to the Sun (2021) and Ellie Engle Saves Herself! (2023).

== Early life and education ==
Johnson was raised on the west side of Indianapolis, Indiana. She was an avid reader from childhood. Johnson went on to be the editor-in-chief of her high school's newspaper as well as a tennis player and a member of the show and concert choirs. While in college at Indiana University Bloomington, she interned at the Wall Street Journal, WFIU, and WPLN. Johnson received her MFA in fiction writing from Sarah Lawrence College.

== Career ==
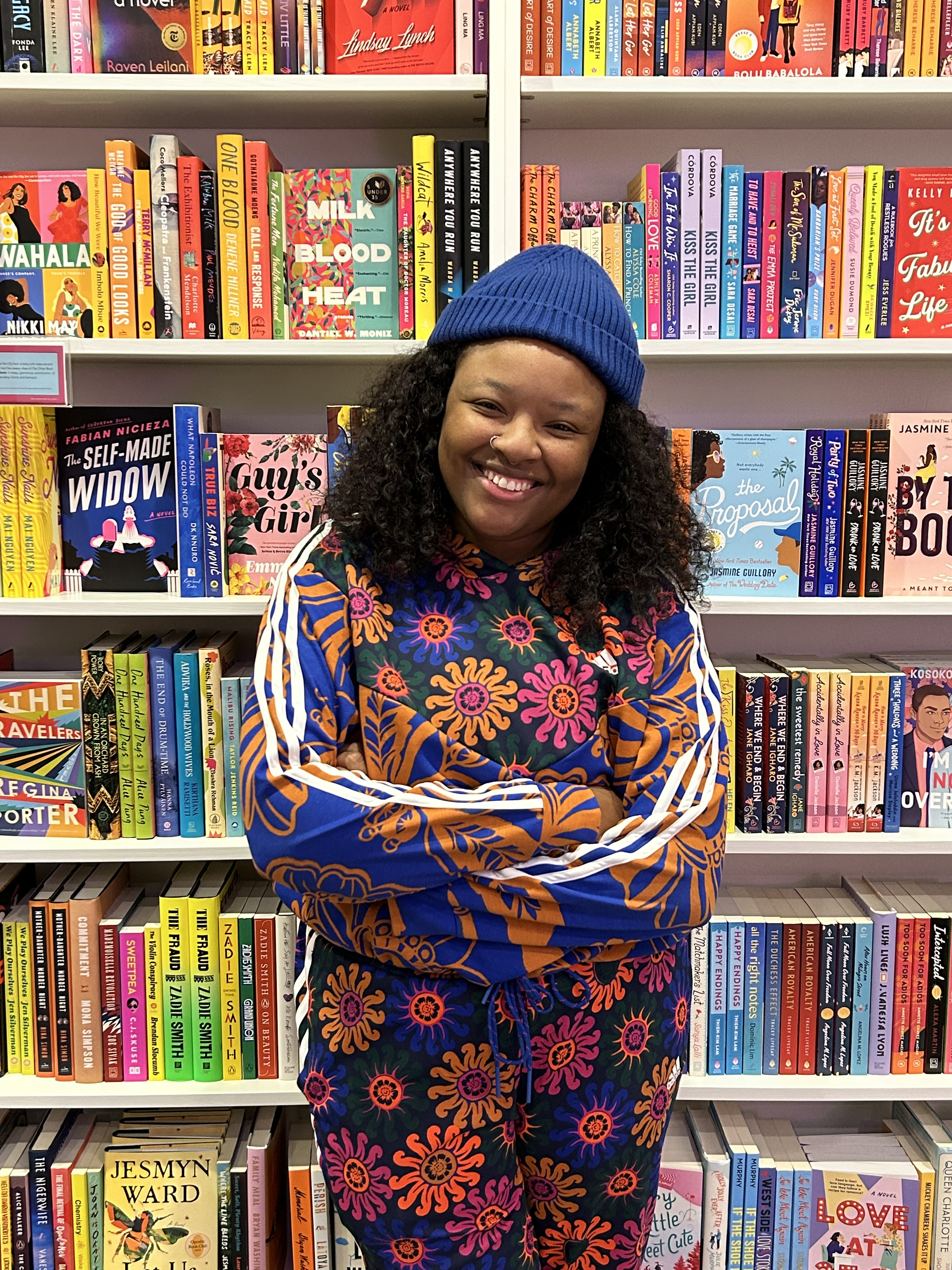
Johnson in 2023

=== Writing career ===
Johnson began the manuscript for her debut novel You Should See Me in a Crown in 2018 as a graduate student at Sarah Lawrence College. After publishing an Electric Literature essay about the dearth of diverse YA literature, editor Sarah Landis reached out to help her craft a book proposal. You Should See Me in a Crown centers a Black queer teenager who runs for prom queen to win a college scholarship. Johnson described the book as "very much an homage to the work that I love the most...John Hughes movies of the eighties, the teen romantic comedies of the late '90s, early aughts... I love those stories so much and wanted to see someone like me reflected in them as more than a sidekick." Published in 2020 by Scholastic, the book received critical acclaim. It received a Stonewall Book honor and was selected as Reese Witherspoon's first YA book of the month, among other accolades. You Should See Me in a Crown was among over 729 books that were banned or challenged in 2021. In 2022 Johnson received the Indiana Authors award for Young Adult Literature for You Should See Me in a Crown.

Her second novel Rise to the Sun was released on July 6, 2021, by Scholastic. The book is about "two girls named Toni and Olivia who both go to a music festival and search for two very different things." In a starred review Publishers Weekly described the book: "Here, Johnson pens a love letter to the healing power of music, enduring friendship, summertime love stories, and hard-won resilience."

Her middle grade debut, Ellie Engle Saves Herself, was published on May 2, 2023, under Disney-Hyperion. The book follows a young girl who discovers she has an amazing superpower. Kirkus Reviews stated in a positive review, "This fast-paced, humorous novel will have readers racing to the end as they fall in love with Ellie’s quirky and authentic personality. Johnson deftly explores identity and responsibility to ourselves and others in this joyful coming-of-age story." Ellie Engle Saves Herself was shortlisted for the 2024 Lambda Literary Award for Middle Grade Literature.

In 2023 it was announced that Johnson and author George M. Johnson signed a seven-figure book deal with FSG Books for Young Readers. Their first collaboration, There's Always Next Year, was published in December 2025.

In November 2024, Johnson released an anthology titled Black Girl Power through the Disney imprint Freedom Fire Press. The anthology centers stories about girlhood from 15 authors of the Black diaspora including Elise Bryant, Sharon M. Draper, Kekla Magoon, and Ibi Zoboi. Black Girl Power received a starred review from Kirkus Reviews and was a USA Today bestseller.

=== Loudmouth Books ===
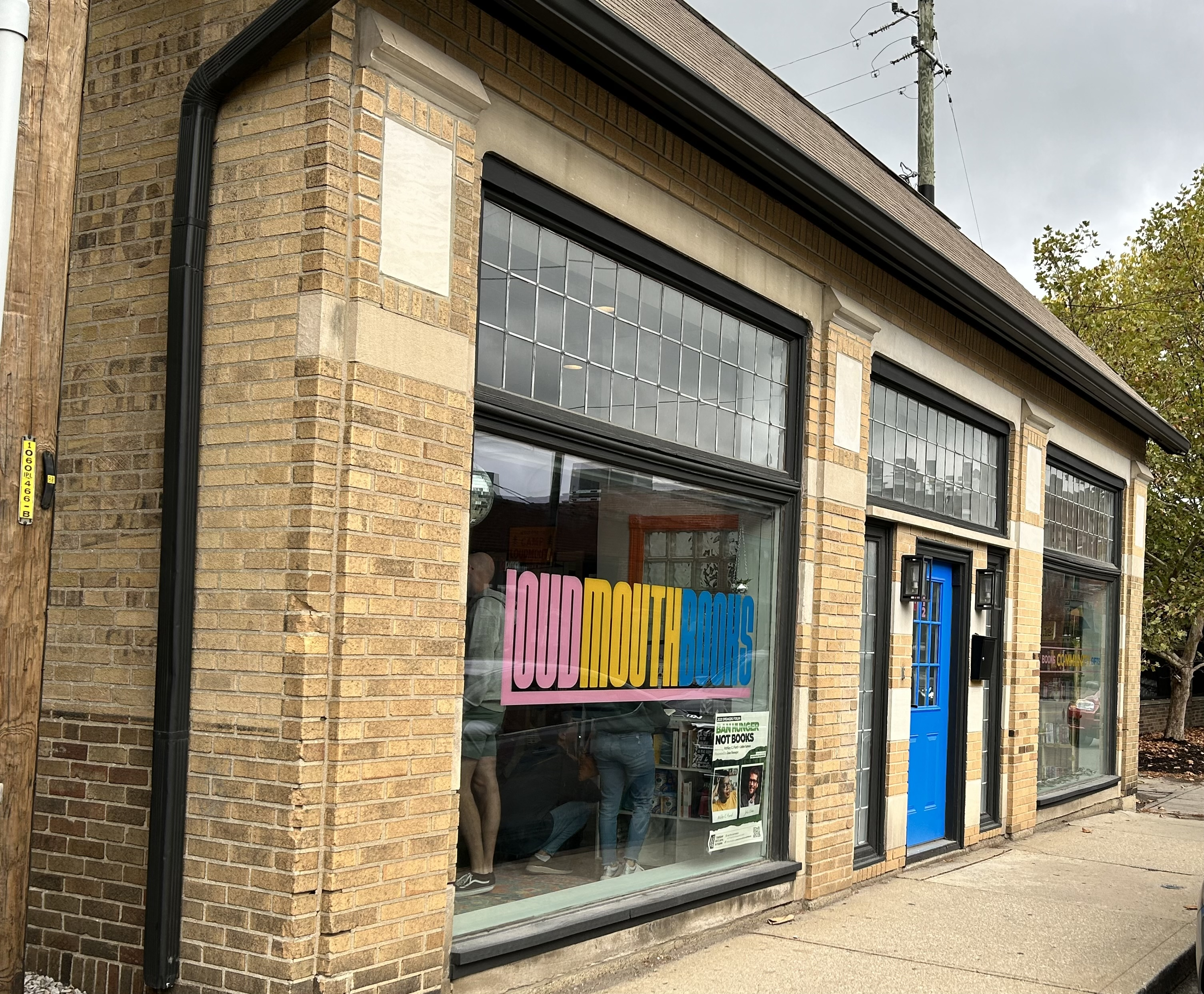
Loudmouth Books in Indianapolis, Indiana

In June 2023, after the state of Indiana passed a law banning many books from school libraries, Johnson announced plans to open Loudmouth Books, an independent bookshop dedicated to "highlighting banned books and uplifting the work of marginalized authors." A GoFundMe campaign to support the store's start-up costs raised $16,570 toward its goal of $10,000. The bookstore opened in September 2023 in Indianapolis, Indiana.

== Personal life ==
Johnson resides in Indianapolis. She is queer, and came to accept her sexuality while writing her debut novel You Should See Me In A Crown.

== Awards and honors ==
Two of Johnson's books are Junior Library Guild selections: You Should See Me in a Crown and Rise to the Sun.

Time included You Should See Me in a Crown on their list of the "100 Best Young Adult Books of All Time". Kirkus Reviews and Publishers Weekly included it on their list of the best young adult books of 2020. The following year, the Young Adult Library Services Association named the novel among their top 10 Quick Picks for Reluctant Young Adult Readers. They also included it on the following lists: Amazing Audiobooks for Young Adults, Best Fiction for Young Adults, and Rise: A Feminist Book Project.

Booklist included Ellie Engle Saves Herself! on their list of the top ten science fiction and fantasy novels for youth published in 2023. The following year, the American Library Association included it on their Rainbow List.

Awards for Johnson's writing
Year	Title	Award	Result	Ref.
2020	You Should See Me in a Crown	Goodreads Choice Award for Best Young Adult Fiction	Nominated	
2020	You Should See Me in a Crown	Lambda Literary Award for Young Adult Literature	Finalist	
2020	You Should See Me in a Crown	Ripped Bodice Award for Excellence in Romantic Fiction	Won	
2021	You Should See Me in a Crown	Stonewall Book Award	Honor	
2022	You Should See Me in a Crown	Indiana Authors Award for Young Adult Literature	Won	
2024	Ellie Engle Saves Herself	Lambda Literary Award for Middle Grade Literature	Finalist	

== Works ==
- You Should See Me in a Crown. United States, Scholastic Inc ISBN 978-1-338-50326-5, 2 June 2020, print and digital
- Rise to the Sun. United States, Scholastic ISBN 978-1-338-66223-8, 6 July 2021, print and digital
- Ellie Engle Saves Herself!. United States, Disney-Hyperion ISBN 978-1-368-08555-7 2 May 2023, print and digital
- Bree Boyd Is a Legend. United States, Disney-Hyperion. ISBN 9781368090100. 4 March 2025. Print and digital.
- There's Always Next Year. United States, Farrar, Straus and Giroux (BYR). ISBN 9780374391690. 2 December 2025. Print and digital.
