= You Should See Me in a Crown (novel) =

2020 young adult novel

- First edition
- Author: Leah Johnson
- Language: English
- Genre: Young Adult
- Publisher: Scholastic Press
- Publication date: June 2, 2020
- Publication place: United States
- Media type: Print Hardcover
- Pages: 336 (Hardcover edition)
- ISBN: 9781338503265
- OCLC: 1111972556
- Website: https://www.byleahjohnson.com/

You Should See Me in a Crown is a debut young adult novel by Leah Johnson, published by Scholastic in June 2020. The book was given a Stonewall Book honor, and TIME magazine named it one of the best 100 young adult books of all time.

The novel follows Liz Lighty, who hatches a plan to leave the "small, rich, prom-obsessed midwestern town" she lives in because she feels "too black, too poor, too awkward" to live her best life there.

== Plot ==
Liz Lighty longs to leave her hometown of Campbell, Indiana and makes plans to start a new life at the elite Pennington College, where she aims to join their world-renowned orchestra and study to become a doctor. Liz hopes to enroll at Pennington with the help of financial aid but when the aid suddenly becomes unavailable, she reluctantly decides to join a contest at her high school which awards scholarships to the prom king and queen after being convinced to do so by her friend Gabi.

Liz also meets the bright and witty Mack who is the new drummer in their music class. Liz helps Mack learn the music after school. They bond over both of them disliking the popular crowd of students who are constantly using Campbell Confidential and discover they both have a similar music taste and have the same favorite band, Kittredge, a rock band. Liz and Mack go to a Kittredge show together where Liz discovers that Mack is cousins with the bassist of the band. After the show they get milkshakes together and discuss music. They kiss and become each others girlfriends.

Liz starts to blow off plans with her friends to hang out with Mack. Mack decides to quit the prom queen race. At a party Liz notices that Mack is talking to another girl while she is hanging out with the jocks. She is jealous, and approaches her later in the night, they argue because Liz doesn't want to be seen in public together. Mack doesn't believe winning prom queen is a suitable excuse for hiding their relationship and they break up.

A week before prom, votes have been cast for prom queen and king and Liz and her friends are eating lunch when Teela Conrad, lead singer of Kittredge enters the cafeteria and sings to Liz. Then Mack rolls in on her skateboard and reveals a message on the bottom: Liz Lighty will you go to prom with me? At prom, Liz and Mack go as a couple. Jordan's ex, Emme returns and dances with him. When prom queen and king are announced, Liz and Jordan are the winners. However, Jordan hops off the stage and places the crown on Mack's head, letting Liz and Mack have their winning dance together.

== Publication history ==
- United States, Scholastic Inc ISBN 9781338503265, 2 June 2020, Hardback

== Reception ==
On its release, You Should See Me in a Crown received positive reviews and temporarily sold out across various retailers. Publishers Weekly included the novel in its Children's Institute 2020: Indies Introduce Debut Authors list, Forbes profiled it during Pride month 2020, and Time cited it as a fiction book that can contribute to anti-racism work through storytelling that centers Black people. Goodreads included it in its list of Popular Queer Young Adult Fiction list for June 2020 calling it "a self-love anthem for queer black girls everywhere."

Accolades for You Should See Me in a Crown
Year	Accolade	Result	Ref.
	TIME's 100 Best Young Adult Books of All Time	Selection	
2020	Kirkus Reviews' Best Books of 2020	Selection	
2020	Goodreads Choice Award for Young Adult Fiction	Nominee	
2021	Stonewall Book Award	Honor Book	
2021	YALSA's Quick Picks for Reluctant Young Adult Readers	Top Ten	
2021	YALSA's Best Fiction for Young Adults	Selection	
