= The Paris Apartment =

2022 mystery novel by Lucy Foley

- Author: Lucy Foley
- Genre: Mystery novel
- Publication date: 2022
- ISBN: 978-0-06-300305-7

The Paris Apartment is a mystery novel by British author Lucy Foley. The novel is set in Paris, and follows a young woman named Jess who investigates the disappearance of her half-brother, Ben.

It was published in February 2022 by William Morrow and Company, an imprint of HarperCollins, and was a New York Times bestseller.

== Plot ==
Jess Hadley arrives in Paris hoping to stay with her half-brother Ben Daniels, a journalist who recently moved into an upscale apartment building. When she reaches the address, Ben is nowhere to be found. His phone, wallet, Vespa, and even his cat are still there, but there is no sign of him. The building is eerily quiet and its residents are cold and unwelcoming. Jess breaks into Ben's locked apartment and begins to suspect that something is terribly wrong.

As Jess starts looking into Ben's disappearance, she meets the building's odd and secretive residents. These include Sophie Meunier, a glamorous woman living in the penthouse; Jacques, her powerful and imposing husband; Antoine, Jacques's hot-tempered alcoholic son; Nick, another son and a former friend of Ben's from university; Mimi, an emotionally unstable art student; Camille, Mimi's roommate; and the reclusive concierge. Jess finds their behaviour suspicious—no one seems concerned that Ben has vanished, and many seem eager for her to leave.

Determined to uncover the truth, Jess begins investigating Ben's activities prior to his disappearance. With help from Theo, an editor Ben had planned to pitch a story to, she learns that Ben had been investigating something dangerous. A strange metal card found in Ben's wallet leads Jess to a shadowy club called "Le Petite Mort," tied to an underground sex trafficking ring. As she digs deeper, Jess realizes Ben had uncovered connections between the club and some of the apartment's residents.

Meanwhile, Jess begins piecing together the relationships within the building. Although the tenants appeared unrelated, she discovers they are in fact part of the same wealthy and dysfunctional family. Jacques is the father of Antoine and Nick and Sophie adopted Mimi as a child. The family has deep ties to criminal activity, including Jacques's involvement in the secretive sex club, which catered to elite clientele and trafficked young Eastern European women. The concierge is revealed to be Mimi's grandmother, who moved to Paris to watch over her granddaughter whose mother was one of the trafficked women.

Jess's search takes her through hidden parts of the building, including secret staircases, the wine cellar, and an attic space once used for staff. During a Halloween party in the cellar, Jess notices strange behaviour from the family, and soon after, she is drugged and disoriented. She later finds torn paintings of Ben in Mimi's apartment, indicating an unhealthy obsession. As Jess's investigation intensifies, so do the dangers, she is followed, threatened and nearly trapped in the cellar.

Flashbacks reveal that Ben had been interviewing a trafficked woman who had escaped from the club. With her help, he obtained damning evidence against Jacques. Mimi had fallen in love with Ben. Believing he loved her as well, she purchases lingerie and sneaks into his apartment intending to seduce him, only to discover his story and that he is having an affair with Sophie. Heartbroken, Mimi lashes out at Camille but later sees Jacques attacking Ben when he found out about his story and stabbed her father to protect Ben. Finding Jacques dead, Sophie covers the body in torn down curtains and convinces the others it is Ben who is dead and they cover up the incident and bury Jacques' body. In the chaos, Ben, severely injured, was hidden in the maid's attic by Sophie, who kept his survival a secret even from the rest of the family.

Jess is confronted by Nick and Antoine who believe she knows too much, Jess fights them off, stabbing Antoine in self-defence.

Jess eventually uncovers Ben in the attic, barely alive, Sophie discovers them both. Jess appeals to Sophie, who helps get Ben to safety. Ben is hospitalised and begins to recover.

In the aftermath, Ben's story is published, exposing the criminal ring and its powerful clientele. Sophie agrees to sell up her family's wealth and assets to assist the trafficking victims and dismantle the operation. Antoine dies by suicide, unwilling to face the consequences of his actions. Nick is presumed to have fled, and Mimi disappears to the south of France. Jess, finally free from the dangers that haunted her in Paris, starts a new life in Italy, carrying with her the scars of the harrowing experience but also a renewed sense of purpose.

== Reception ==
The Paris Apartment received positive reviews in USA Today, Paste, and Publishers Weekly. A review published in The Independent praised the novel's fast pace, but noted that avid fans of the mystery genre may find the ending predictable.

It was a Book of the Month selection by author Ashley Audrain.

== Adaptation ==
In 2022, 3000 Pictures, a division of Sony Pictures, purchased the film rights to The Paris Apartment. The film adaptation was to be produced by Peter Czernin and Graham Broadbent for Blueprint Pictures.
