= Lucy Foley =

British novelist

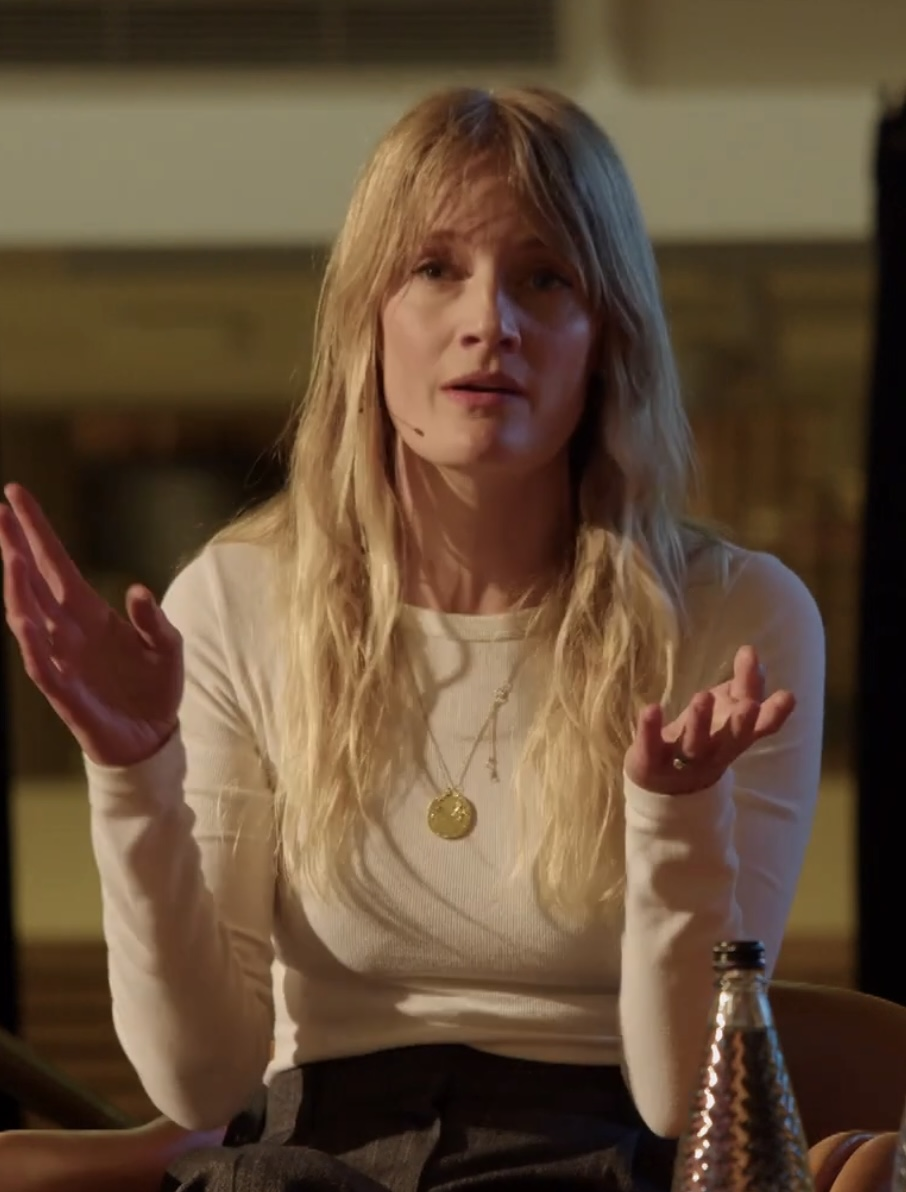
- Foley at the British Library in 2022
- Born: 16 August 1986 (age 40); Sussex, England
- Occupation: Novelist

Lucy Foley (born 16 August 1986 in Sussex, England) is a British author of contemporary, historical fiction and mystery novels. Her novels The Paris Apartment and The Guest List are New York Times best sellers.

== Education ==
Foley went to Westbourne House School in Chichester and Portsmouth High School. She went on to study English literature at University College London and Durham University.

== Career ==
Foley worked as an editor at Headline Publishing Group and Hodder & Stoughton before writing full-time.

== The Guest List (2020) ==
The Guest List is a thriller novel published on 2 June 2020 by William Morrow. The book is a New York Times and Washington Post best-seller.

The Guest List received a starred review from Library Journal, as well as positive reviews from Booklist, The New York Times Book Review, Good Housekeeping, Marie Claire, The Washington Post, BuzzFeed, Harper's Bazaar, Shelf Awareness, and PopSugar. Publishers Weekly provided a mixed review.

The book also received the following accolades:

- New York Times Best Thrillers of 2020
- Goodreads Choice Award for Mystery & Thriller (2020)
- CWA Gold Dagger Award Longlist (2020)

== The Paris Apartment (2022) ==
The Paris Apartment was published on 22 February 2022. It is a mystery/thriller novel. The book was named one of the most anticipated books of the year by Goodreads and Good Housekeeping.

== Murder at the Grand Alpine Hotel (2026) ==
Published on 22 September 2026, Murder at the Grand Alpine Hotel is a continuation of Agatha Christie's Miss Marple series of mystery novels.

== Bibliography ==
- The Book of Lost and Found (2015)
- The Invitation (2016)
- Last Letter from Istanbul (2018)
- The Hunting Party (2018)
- The Guest List (2020)
- The Paris Apartment (2022)
- "Evil in Small Places", Marple: Twelve New Stories (2022)
- The Midnight Feast (2024)
- Murder at the Grand Alpine Hotel (2026)
