= Andrea Bartz =

American writer

Andrea Bartz is an American writer. She is the author of New York Times bestselling mystery and thriller novel We Were Never Here.

== Anthropic copyright lawsuit ==
In August 2024, Bartz joined Kirk Wallace Johnson and Charles Graeber as lead plaintiffs in a class-action lawsuit was filed against the artificial intelligence company Anthropic, alleging copyright infringement. The suit claimed Anthropic fed its LLMs with pirated copies of the authors' work. On June 23, 2025, the United States District Court for the Northern District of California ruled that Anthropic's use of digital copies of the plaintiffs' works was fair use, but it also found that Anthropic had improperly used millions of pirated library copies. As the case headed to trial on the use of pirated copies, Anthropic agreed in September 2025 to pay authors $1.5 billion to settle the case, which, if approved, would be the largest copyright resolution in U.S. history.

== Personal life ==
Bartz was born in Brookfield, Wisconsin and lives in Brooklyn, New York. Her sister is Julia Bartz.

== Books ==
- The Lost Night (2019) Crown, ISBN 978-0525574729
- The Herd (2020) Ballantine Books, ISBN 978-1984826381
- We Were Never Here (2021) Ballantine Books, ISBN 978-1984820488
- The Spare Room (2023) Ballantine Books, ISBN 978-1984820518
- The Last Ferry Out (2025) Ballantine Books, ISBN 978-0593597972
