= Julia Bartz (writer) =

American clinical therapist, writer

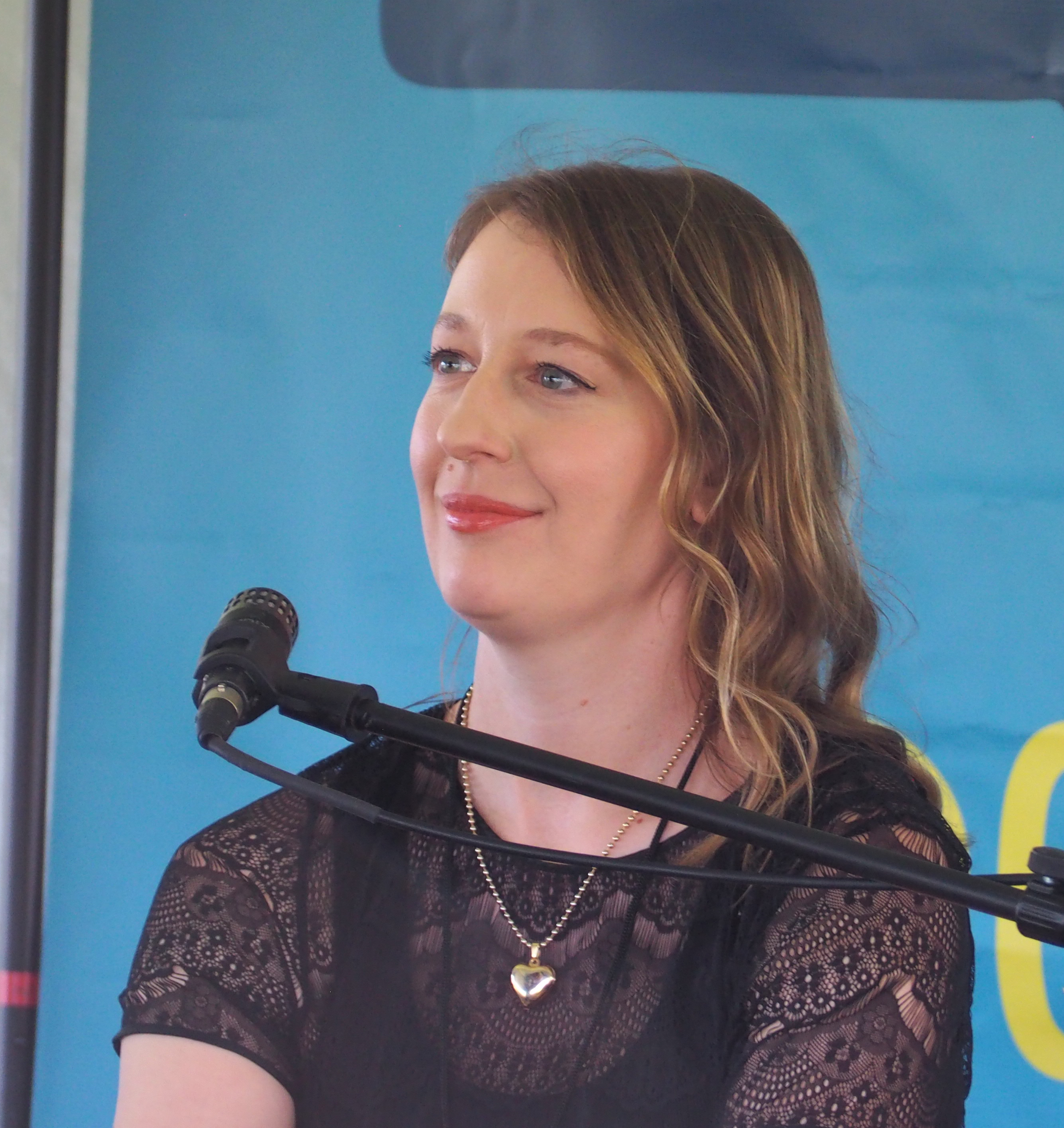

Julia Bartz is an American clinical therapist and writer.

== Life ==
She graduated from Hunter College in New York. Her reviews appeared in CrimeReads.

Her sister is Andrea Bartz.

== Selected works ==
- The Writing Retreat, Simon & Schuster, 2023.
- The Last Session, Simon & Schuster, 2025.
