= Santa Cruz Museum of Art and History =

Museum in Santa Cruz, California

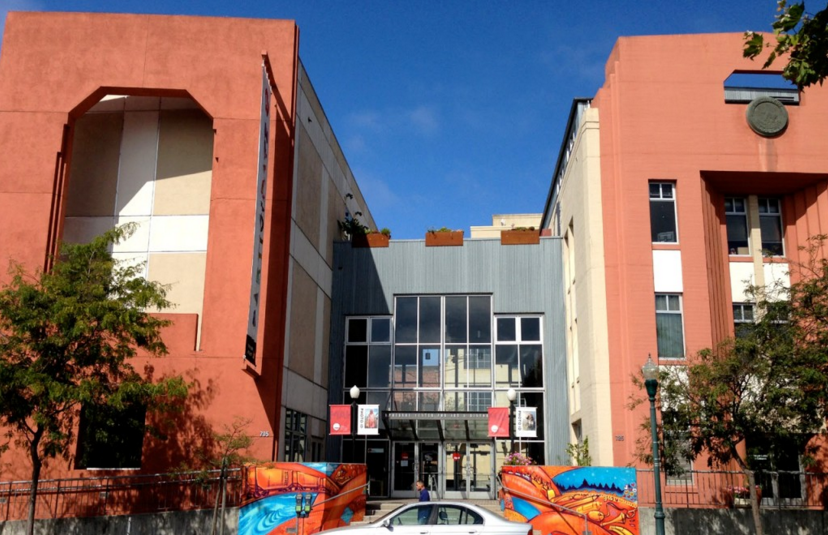

- Location within California Location within the United States
- Established: 1996
- Location: 705 Front Street; Santa Cruz, California
- Coordinates: 36.974476°N 122.025451°W
- Type: Art and history
- Executive director: Ginger Shulick Porcella
- Website: santacruzmah.org

The Santa Cruz Museum of Art and History (MAH) is a nonprofit educational institution and museum founded in 1996 and located in Santa Cruz, California, at the downtown McPherson Center. Its mission is to ignite shared experiences and unexpected connections, using art and history to build a stronger, more connected community.

== About ==
The art collection is successor to the Santa Cruz County Museum of Art (founded in 1982). The history collection of the museum is successor to the Santa Cruz Historical Society (founded in 1954). History holdings include a permanent local Monterey Bay Area history gallery, research library and archive. The history collection has over 7,000 items, with collection guides viewable online.

The Museum includes a history publications arm, established by the Fred D. McPherson Jr. Publications Fund. Publications include periodic issues of the Santa Cruz County History Journal (eight issues as of January, 2016), other local history books, and an Online History Journal.

The Museum operates the Abbott Square community plaza, and three historical structures/sites including Evergreen Cemetery, Davenport Jail, and the Octagon Building. Many community programs are designed by, with, and for community members in Santa Cruz County.

== Directors ==
Ginger Shulick Porcella was installed as executive director in 2025. The MAH appointed Rob Woulfe the executive director in 2020. He was preceded by Nina Simon, who served from 2012 until June 2019.

- Ginger Shulick Porcella, 2025–present
- Rob Woulfe, 2020–2024
- Nina Simon, 2012–2019
- Charles "Chuck" Noel Hilger, 1996–2003
