= The Guest List =

2020 novel by Lucy Foley

- Author: Lucy Foley
- Language: English
- Genre: Mystery novel
- Publisher: Harper Collins; William Morrow
- Publication date: May 2020
- Pages: 320
- ISBN: 978-0-06-286893-0

The Guest List is a 2020 mystery novel by British author Lucy Foley. The story takes place at the wedding of Jules Keegan and Will Slater, which is being held on an island off the coast of Ireland. The plot has been compared to the works of Agatha Christie, as a murder occurs with limited suspects and each guest has a secret which will be revealed.

It was published in May 2020 by HarperCollins and on 2 June 2020 by William Morrow. It became a New York Times, Sunday Times and Washington Post bestseller, selling over a million copies in 30 territories. The novel was named one of the best thrillers of 2020 by The New York Times, was longlisted for the CWA Gold Dagger Award and won the Goodreads Choice Award for Mystery and Thriller.

== Plot ==
Set on a remote, windswept island off the coast of Ireland, The Guest List centres around the glamorous yet tension-filled wedding of Jules Keegan, a successful London magazine publisher, and Will Slater, a handsome and charming television personality. The couple has chosen to hold their wedding at “The Folly,” an isolated venue owned by the wedding planner Aoife and her husband Freddy. As guests begin to arrive by boat, a storm rolls in, cutting off all communication with the mainland and heightening the island's ominous atmosphere.

The story unfolds through the alternating perspectives of several key characters: Jules; Olivia, her fragile and troubled half-sister and bridesmaid; Hannah, a guest and the wife of Jules's longtime friend Charlie; Johnno, Will's best man and childhood friend; and Aoife, the wedding planner. As the narrative shifts between the wedding day and flashbacks to the preceding events, long-buried secrets begin to surface among the group of friends and family gathered on the island.

Olivia is grappling with a recent traumatic event that has left her emotionally unstable. She is deeply depressed after being ghosted and humiliated by Steven, a man she met online, and is haunted by an abortion she suffered alone. As the wedding approaches, she grows more withdrawn, especially around Will. Hannah, meanwhile, is feeling increasingly alienated from her husband Charlie, who seems unusually attentive to Jules. She is also mourning the anniversary of the death of her sister Alice, who committed suicide several years prior after her university boyfriend leaked intimate videos of her in revenge for her breaking up with him.

Johnno harbours a deep sense of inferiority and resentment stemming from his days at Trevellyan, an elite boarding school he attended with Will and several of the other ushers. The group recalls a cruel game called “Survival,” in which they tormented a vulnerable classmate nicknamed “Loner” or “Darcey.” Johnno is burdened with guilt about the role he and Will played in the boy's accidental death—an event they have never acknowledged or taken responsibility for.

As the wedding festivities begin, tensions simmer beneath the polished surface. Olivia becomes increasingly agitated and it is revealed that Will is actually Steven, having used a fake name while with her then left her for Jules and is blackmailing her into keeping silent. Simultaneously, Hannah discovers that Will was the man who Alice dated in university and leaked the video that led to her suicide. These revelations begin to align with a series of threatening anonymous notes that Jules has been receiving, warning her not to marry Will.

The narrative reaches its climax during the wedding reception. Johnno discovers that Will secretly cut him out of the television series they pitched together. Jules overhears Olivia and Will arguing about their affair and realises he's lied to her their entire relationship. The storm causes a power outage and, amid the chaos and darkness, a scream is heard. When the lights come back on, a waiter discovers Will's body on the shoreline—he has been stabbed to death. Panic ensues, and suspicion falls on several characters, each with their own motive for wanting Will dead.

Eventually, the truth is revealed: Aoife, the wedding planner, is the one who killed Will. She is the sister of Darcey, the boy who died years ago during the brutal school ritual orchestrated by Will and his friends. She lured them to the island by offering a substantial discount for the wedding in hope that Will would give her closure over her brother's death. Realising he feels no remorse for his role in Darcey's death, Aoife kills him to avenge her brother.

The novel ends in the aftermath of the murder. Johnno takes the blame, overwhelmed by guilt for Darcey's death and convinced that he deserves punishment for his past actions. Jules and Olivia begin to reconcile, finding renewed closeness after years of emotional distance. Hannah and Charlie leave the island shaken, their relationship uncertain after Charlie admits to having an affair with Jules. Hannah and Aoife find solace in their siblings' deaths being avenged.

== Background and publication ==
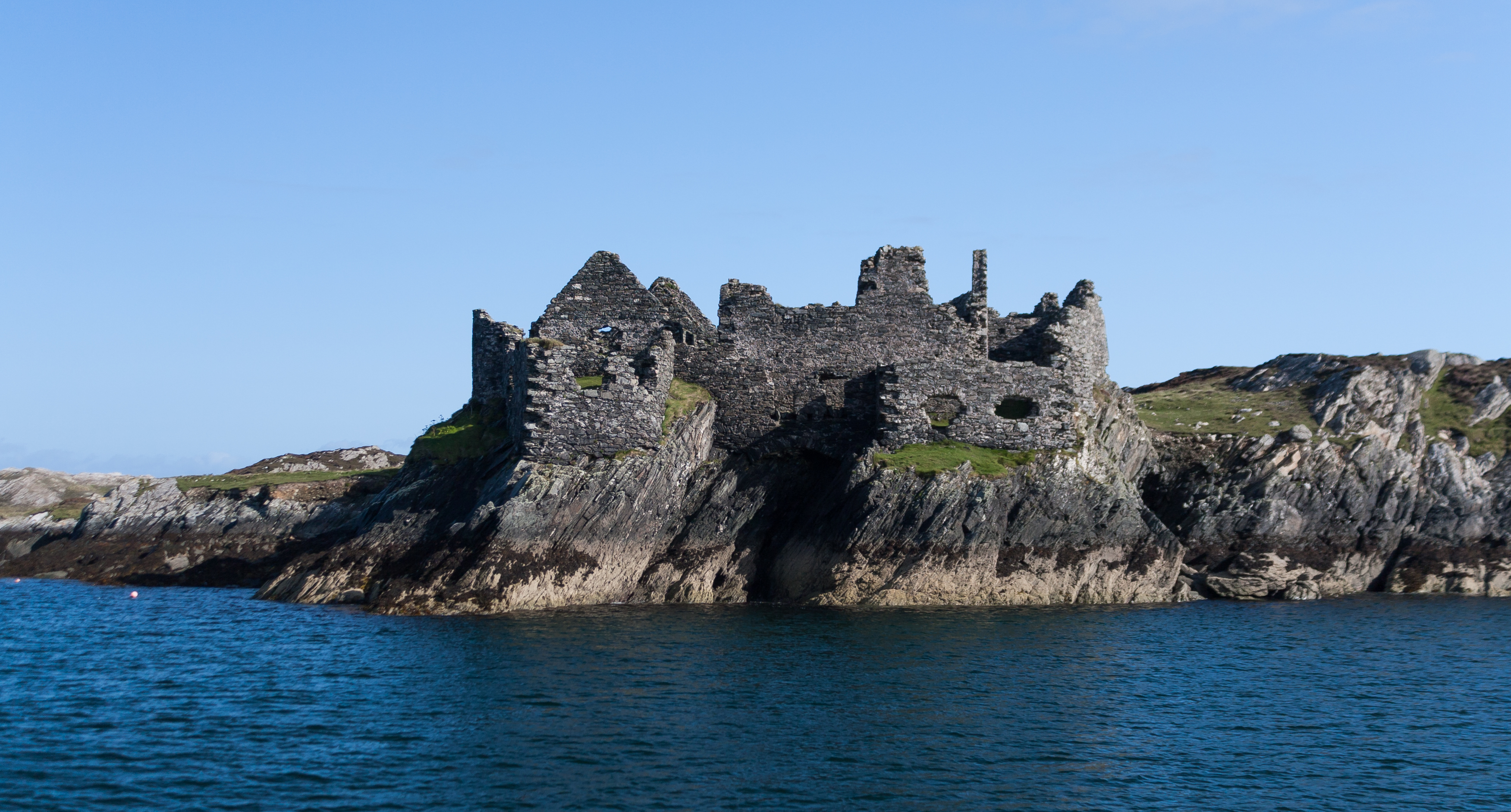
Inishbofin, which inspired the setting of the novel, in 2018

Lucy Foley published her previous thriller novel The Hunting Party in 2019, which was a bestseller. Foley originally intended to set the novel on a Greek island but while on Inishbofin, an island off Connemara in Ireland, she decided that it would be a better setting. Many reviews compared the novel to the works of Agatha Christie, particularly And Then There Were None and Murder on the Orient Express. Similar to Christie's works, Foley often writes closed circle mysteries, wherein the murderer cannot escape the scene of the crime and there are limited suspects.

The novel was published in May 2020 by HarperCollins and on 2 June 2020, by William Morrow. The audiobook was published by Harper Audio in 2020 and was voiced by an ensemble cast of Jot Davies, Chloe Massey, Olivia Dowd, Aoife McMahon, Sarah Ovens and Rich Keeble.

== Reception ==
The Guest List received generally positive reviews, including a starred review from Library Journal.

It became a New York Times, Sunday Times and Washington Post bestseller, selling over a million copies in 30 territories. The novel was named one of the best thrillers of 2020 by The New York Times, was longlisted for the CWA Gold Dagger Award and won the Goodreads Choice Award for Mystery and Thriller. It was chosen as a pick for Reese's Book Club. The audiobook was a 2021 Audies Finalist.

The Library Journal praised the setting and Foley's ability to navigate a complex plot with eight characters' perspectives. The plot was described by Marie Clarie as "enthralling", with Harper's Bazaar commenting that "Foley has honed her unique brand of reverse-whodunit suspense down to a science". However it received a mixed review from Publishers Weekly, which praised the setting but criticized the twists as not matching the novel's tone. Jane Murphy in a review for Booklist argued that the dark tension detracts from the novel in places but commented that the tone and plot will be enjoyed by fans of the genre. Good Housekeeping and The Washington Post praised the tension, which was described by the former as "building [...] to breaking point", and the atmosphere, including peat bogs, a mansion and caves.

== Adaptation ==
On October 24, 2023, it was announced that Hulu was adapting the novel into a television miniseries. Liz Tigelaar will be the executive producer as well as Lucy Foley. There has been no new information since then.
