= Christie Tate =

American writer

Christie Tate is an American writer and essayist known for her memoirs Group: How One Therapist and a Circle of Strangers Saved My Life and B.F.F.: A Memoir of Friendship Lost and Found. Her work primarily explores mental health, personal relationships, and vulnerability, with a focus on themes drawn from her own life experiences. Group became a New York Times bestseller and was selected as a Reese’s Book Club pick in 2020.

== Early life and education ==
Christie Tate grew up in Texas. She completed a Bachelor of Arts in English at Texas A&M University and later obtained a master's in humanities from the University of Chicago. She graduated at the top of her class from Loyola University Chicago School of Law in 2003, where she served as an academic tutor and editor of the law journal. Despite her academic and professional success, Tate struggled with personal issues, which led her to seek group therapy.

== Career ==
Tate initially worked as a litigation associate at Skadden, Arps, Slate, Meagher & Flom LLP, and later at Epstein Becker & Green, focusing on employment law. She also served as an assistant regional counsel for the Social Security Administration until 2021. During this period, she began blogging about her experiences and later transitioned to writing professionally.

=== Group: How One Therapist and a Circle of Strangers Saved My Life ===
Published in 2020, Group is a memoir that recounts Tate's seven-year experience in an unconventional group therapy setting led by a therapist she calls "Dr. Rosen." The book describes her journey from isolation and self-doubt to a deeper understanding of personal connection and self-acceptance. The memoir has been praised for its candor and humor, particularly in its exploration of group dynamics and mental health.

=== B.F.F.: A Memoir of Friendship Lost and Found ===
In B.F.F. (2023), Tate examines the nuances of female friendships and the complexities of maintaining meaningful connections. She discusses her relationships, including one with her late friend Meredith, and challenges conventional ideals of friendship, arguing that relationships can be fluid and do not necessarily need to be lifelong to be significant.

== Personal life ==
Tate currently resides in Chicago with her family. She continues to write about personal growth, mental health, and relationships.
