= Josh Singer =

American screenwriter and producer (born 1972)

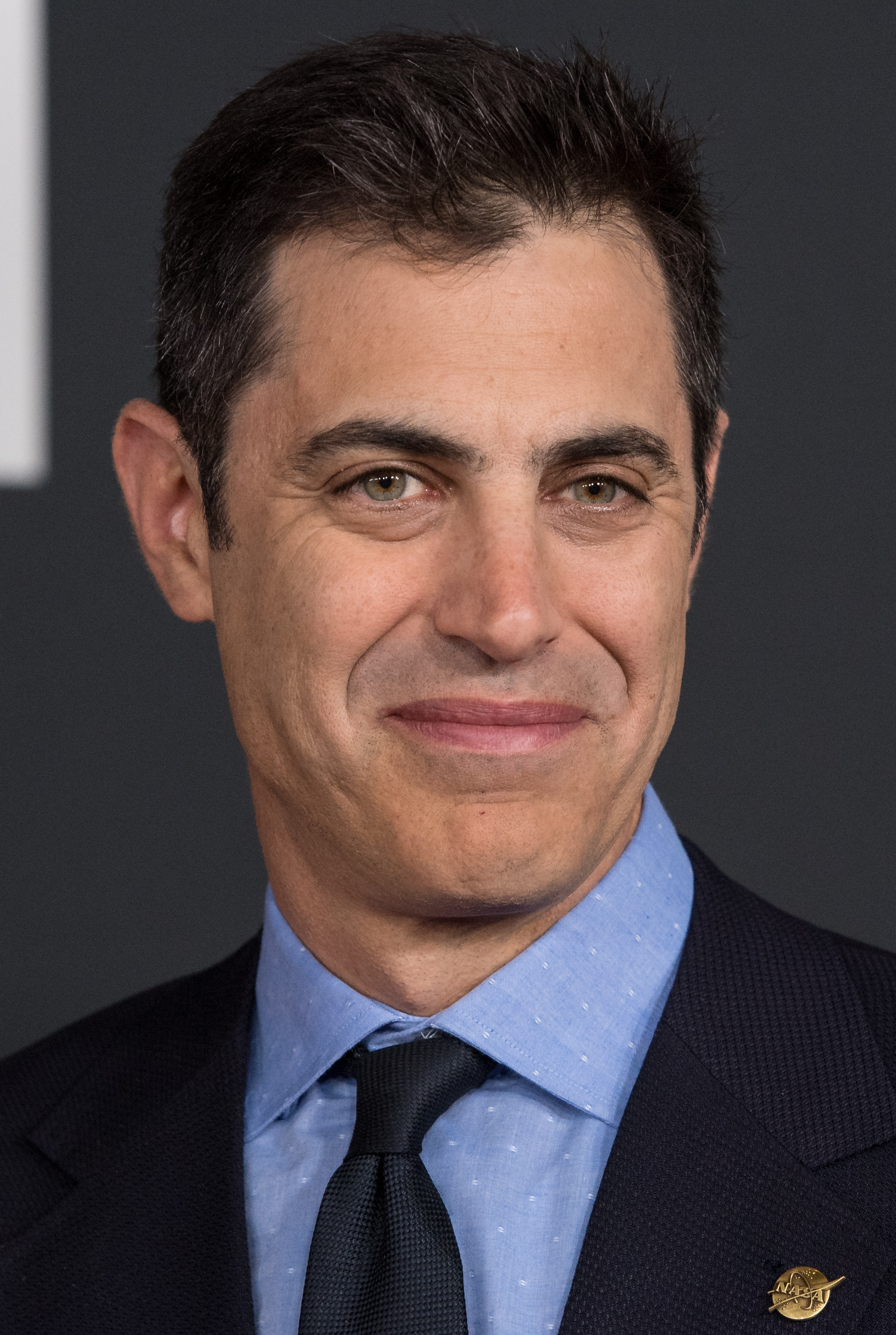
- Singer in 2018
- Born: 1972 (age 53–54); Philadelphia, Pennsylvania, U.S.
- Education: Yale University; Harvard Law School; Harvard Business School
- Occupations: Writer, producer
- Spouse: Laura Dave (m. 2012)
- Children: 1

Josh Singer (born 1972) is an American screenwriter and producer. He is best known for writing The Fifth Estate (2013), Spotlight (2015), The Post (2017), First Man (2018), and Maestro (2023). He won the Academy Award for Best Original Screenplay for Spotlight and was nominated in the same category for Maestro.

== Early life and education ==
Singer was born in Philadelphia, Pennsylvania, and was raised Jewish. His father was born Jewish, and his mother converted to Judaism (she herself was born to a Jewish father and a Catholic mother). Singer attended Upper Dublin High School in Fort Washington, Pennsylvania, where he appeared in musicals and was a member of math club, drama club, video club, and chorus. In high school, he was elected class treasurer, wrote for the school newspaper, and played for the school's baseball team. Singer won many awards, including the Upper Dublin Medal, science competition and literary prizes, and was co-winner of the school district's highest award. In his senior year, he was named class valedictorian, a Presidential Scholar and a National Merit Scholar.

Singer graduated magna cum laude from Yale University, with distinction in mathematics and economics. At Yale, he was a member and business manager of both The Whiffenpoofs and The Yale Alley Cats. Three to four months prior to going to graduate school, he worked for Children's Television Workshop (the name, at that time, of the production company for the TV show "Sesame Street",) and then began doing internships. He did an internship for Nickelodeon in New York and an internship for Disney Channel out in L.A., working for Roy Price at Disney TV Animation for four or five weeks. As a result, he developed an interest in script writing. He worked as a business analyst for McKinsey & Company before obtaining a J.D. from Harvard Law School and an MBA from Harvard Business School.

== Career ==
After Singer graduated from Harvard, he was hired by showrunner John Wells to write for The West Wing.

In 2006 he was nominated for a WGA award.

Singer was hired in 2013 to write a screenplay for a Leonard Bernstein biopic, but the film languished in development hell for a decade. Eventually, Bradley Cooper was hired to direct the film, and the pair re-wrote Singer's script; they were eventually nominated for the Academy Award for Best Original Screenplay. In 2012, Singer wrote the screenplay for The Fifth Estate. In 2015, he co-wrote the screenplay for Spotlight, for which he received an Academy Award for Best Original Screenplay.

== Personal life ==
In 2011, Singer married the American novelist Laura Dave. They have one son and reside in Los Angeles, California.

== Filmography ==
=== Film ===
Year	Title	Notes
2013	The Fifth Estate	
2015	Spotlight	with Tom McCarthy; Also executive producer Academy Award for Best Original Screenplay; BAFTA Award for Best Original Screenplay; WGA Award for Best Original Screenplay; Nominated—Golden Globe for Best Screenplay
2017	The Post	with Liz Hannah; Also executive producer Nominated—Golden Globe for Best Screenplay
2018	First Man	Nominated—BAFTA Award for Best Adapted Screenplay
2023	Maestro	with Bradley Cooper; Also executive producer Nominated—Academy Award for Best Original Screenplay; Nominated—BAFTA Award for Best Original Screenplay

=== Television ===
Year	Title	Role
2004–2006	The West Wing	Editor and writer
2007–2008	Law & Order: Special Victims Unit	Producer
2009	Lie to Me	Supervising producer
2009–2010	Fringe	Supervising producer
2010–2011	Fringe	Co-executive producer
2023	The Last Thing He Told Me	Executive producer

== Awards and nominations ==
Singer won the Academy Award for Best Original Screenplay and Independent Spirit Award for Best Screenplay for Spotlight in 2015 and was nominated for the Golden Globe Award for Best Screenplay for the film. He also received a Golden Globe nomination for The Post in 2018. In 2023 he was nominated for the Academy Award for Best Original Screenplay alongside Bradley Cooper for the film Maestro.
