= Octagon Building (Santa Cruz, California) =

- U.S. National Register of Historic Places
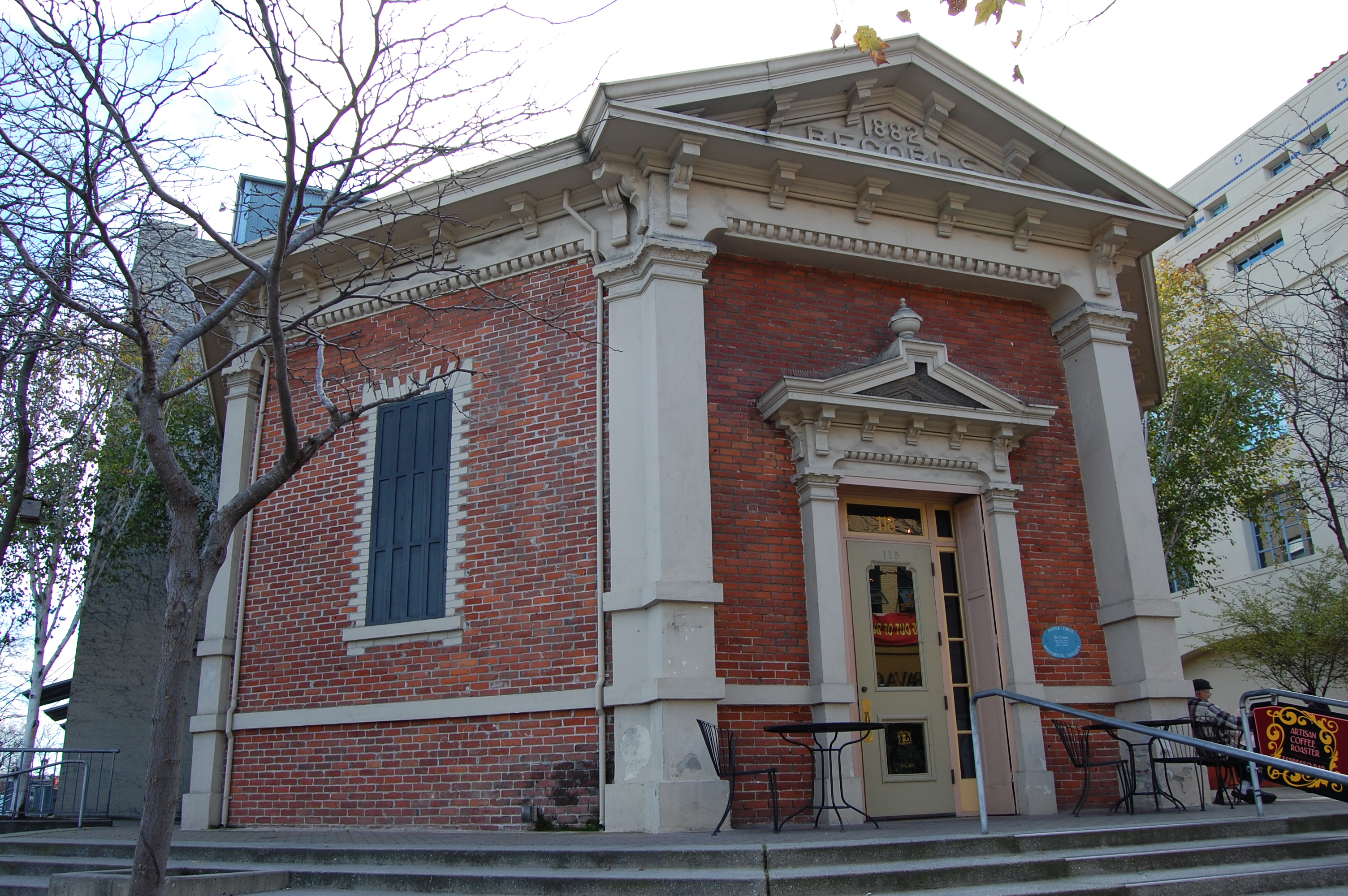

- Location within California Location within the United States
- Location: Corner of Front and Cooper Sts., Santa Cruz, California
- Coordinates: 36°58′29″N 122°1′29″W
- Built: 1882
- Architect: J. W. Newcum
- Architectural style: Octagon Mode
- NRHP reference No.: 71000193
- Added to NRHP: March 24, 1971

Known informally as the Octagon Building, the redbrick octagonal building at 118 Cooper Street (at the corner of Front Street) in Santa Cruz, California was built in 1882, adjacent to the first (1866) County Court House, to serve as the County Hall of Records. In 1894, a major fire destroyed most of the nearby buildings, including the adjacent courthouse, but the brick Octagon survived.

In 1968, the records were moved to a new County Government Center. Many historic brick buildings at the nearby Pacific Garden Mall were damaged during the 1989 Loma Prieta earthquake, but again the Octagon survived. On March 24, 1971, it was added to the National Register of Historic Places.

Still owned by Santa Cruz County and administered by Santa Cruz Museum of Art and History (MAH), for a number of years the Octagon was used as the Museum Store. When an expansion of the museum was completed in 1993, the store was moved into the new entry atrium of the museum. The Octagon was then leased for a few years for use as a coffeehouse. At the end of 2024, the building is used by two food vendors as an extension of the adjacent Abbot Square Marketplace.

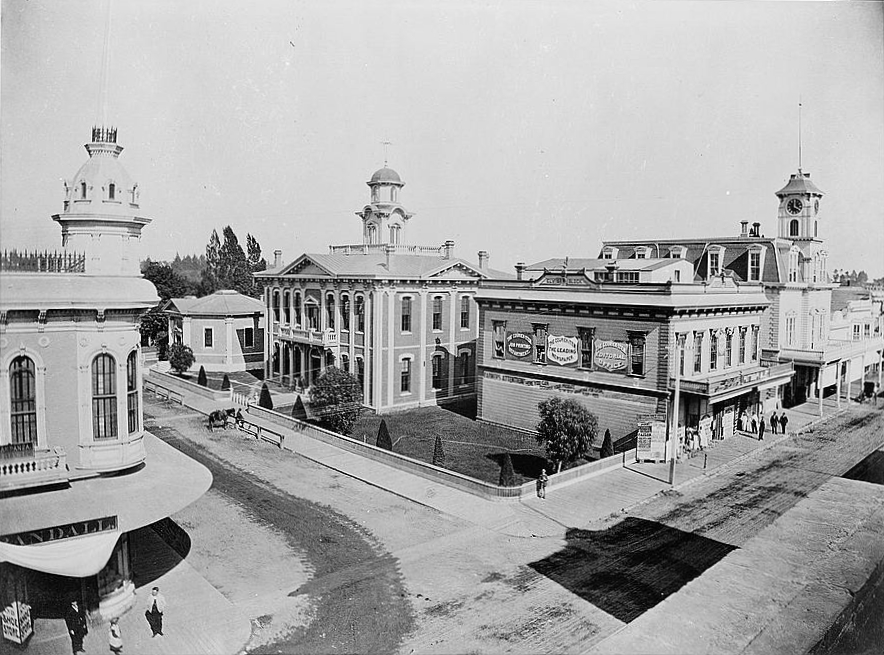
Downtown Santa Cruz, ca. 1890, Octagon Building at left rear

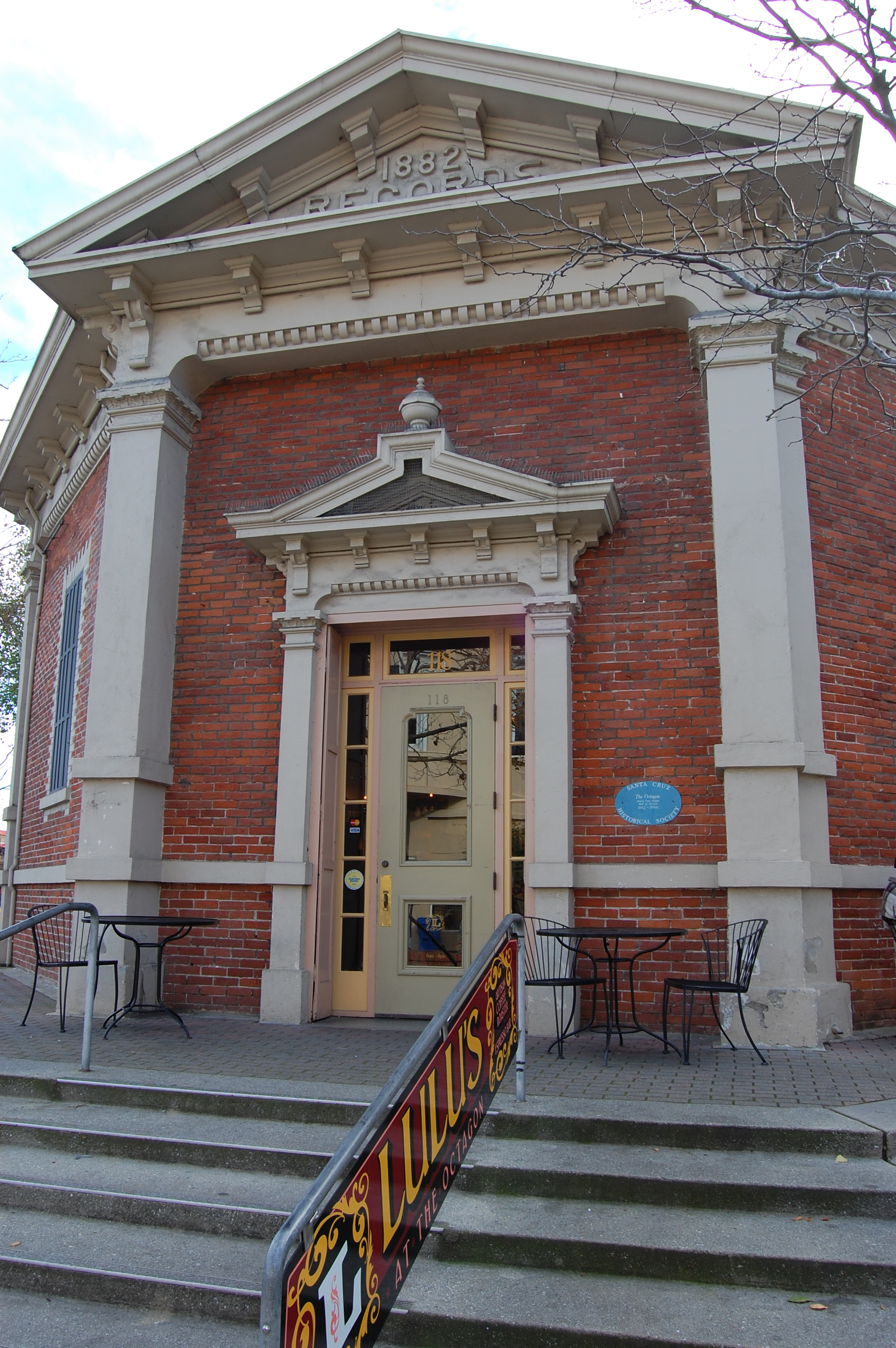

== See also ==
- National Register of Historic Places listings in Santa Cruz County, California
- Octagon house
