= The Last Thing He Told Me =

2021 novel by Laura Dave

- Author: Laura Dave
- Language: English
- Publisher: Simon & Schuster
- Publication date: May 4, 2021
- Publication place: United States
- Media type: Print
- ISBN: 9781501171345

The Last Thing He Told Me is a mystery thriller novel written by Laura Dave, published May 4, 2021 by Simon & Schuster. The book became an instant #1 New York Times Bestseller and spent 82 weeks on The New York Times Best Seller list. It has sold over 5 million copies worldwide.

== Plot ==
Hannah is left to navigate the aftermath when her husband Owen disappears during an embezzlement investigation. He leaves a note telling Hannah to protect Bailey, Owen's teenage daughter. Bailey is often difficult towards Hannah, but after finding a duffel bag from Owen with over $600,000 in cash, she depends on Hannah for answers. The FBI begins to investigate, and Hannah learns Owen is hiding his true identity.

Hannah remembers Owen's defensiveness when she suggested they go to Texas for vacation, and Bailey recalls some early memories from there, leading to their departure from California to Texas. In Austin, his old Professor recalls him and gives them access to old class photos. They discover a picture of a woman, Kate Smith, who looks nearly identical to Bailey. After doing some research, Hannah connects Kate to a bar nearby. She heads over, hiding Bailey in a cafe. Hannah speaks to the bartender, Charlie, gleaning bits of information about the woman—his sister—who has since died. Trying to connect them to Owen, she shows him a picture. Charlie reacts violently, throwing Hannah's phone to the floor. Bailey bursts in and orders him to back away. He freezes in a state of shock, identifying Bailey as Kristin. They return to their hotel to hide and pack for a flight home. While hiding, Hannah gets a phone call.

Bailey remembers that Charlie is her uncle, and Kristin is her real name. She wants to go back out, but Hannah warns it is not safe. In the bathroom, Hannah researches Bailey's family more. She discovers Bailey's grandfather, Nicolas, is connected to a crime syndicate, and Kate was killed when he failed to follow through for them. Owen's real name was Ethan, and after the death of his wife, he provided evidence to convict Nicolas, before he took Kristin and ran. They were meant to hide through Witness Protection, but after a leak, Owen chose to hide them himself.

Hannah smashes her phone and leaves the bathroom, finding the hotel room empty. She searches frantically for Bailey, but cannot find her. A US Marshal agent pulls her aside and lets her know they're looking for Bailey. He attempts to convince her to enter the Witness Protection Program, reasoning that Owen will be able to return to them if she agrees. After he gets news they've found Bailey, she tells him it will be up to her to decide. Hannah sneaks away, and returns to the bar. She asks Charlie to take her to Nicolas to negotiate. Nicolas is heavily guarded, but meets with her one on one. He insists his superiors in the gang will not turn a blind eye toward Ethan's betrayal, so he cannot negotiate his safety. However, Hannah only seeks to ensure Bailey's safety, knowing it is what Owen wants. Nicolas agrees she and Bailey will be safe and can return home. Hannah grapples with the reality Owen won't be part of their lives anymore.

Upon reuniting with Bailey, she learns Owen called her through a special app he installed on her phone. He spoke only twenty seconds, to tell her he was not coming back. Though the U.S. Marshal insists they enter Witness Protection, Bailey is tired and wants to go home, so she and Hannah return to California. Years later, Hannah waits for Bailey to arrive with her newest boyfriend, and a man bumps into her on the street. He looks very different, but he still wears their wedding ring. He only lingers a moment, and is gone before Bailey arrives, calling Hannah "Mom."

== Reception ==
The Last Thing He Told Me was an instant #1 New York Times bestseller and was #1 on the list for eight non-consecutive weeks. The book has spent 65 weeks on The New York Times Best Seller list for hardcover fiction, 6 weeks on The New York Times Best Seller list for trade paperback, as well as four months on the IndieBound best seller list. The book was also an instant #1 bestseller in Canada and remained at #1 for 4 weeks.

The Last Thing He Told Me received positive reviews from BookPage, Library Journal, PureWow, Associated Press, and Kirkus. Publishers Weekly and Booklist gave it a mixed review. The audiobook received a starred review from Booklist.

The book was named the Best Mystery and Thriller of 2021 through the Goodreads Choice Awards.

== Television adaptation ==
Reese Witherspoon's Hello Sunshine purchased the rights to produce a television series based on the book. The miniseries airs on Apple TV+ starring Jennifer Garner, who also serves as executive producer alongside Reese Witherspoon, Josh Singer, and Laura Dave. Dave and Singer wrote the screen adaptation.
