= Laura Dave (novelist) =

American novelist

- Born: July 18, 1977 (age 49); New York City, U.S.
- Education: University of Pennsylvania (BA); University of Virginia (MFA)
- Occupation: Author
- Spouse: Josh Singer (m. 2012)
- Children: 1
- Writing career
- Period: 2006–present
- Subject: Fiction
- Notable works: The Last Thing He Told Me; The First Time I Saw Him; The Divorce Party; The First Husband
- Website: lauradave.com

Laura Dave (born July 18, 1977) is an American novelist. She is the author of several novels, including The Last Thing He Told Me, which became a New York Times bestseller and has been adapted for television.

== Early life ==
Dave was born in New York City and grew up in Scarsdale, New York. Her interest in writing began when she was in elementary school.

Dave graduated from the University of Pennsylvania in 1999, where she received a B.A. in English. She has an MFA from the University of Virginia's creative writing program. She was a Henry Hoyns Fellow and a recipient of the Tennessee Williams Scholarship. She received several awards for her writing including the AWP Intro Award in Short Fiction.

Following graduate school, Dave worked as a freelance journalist for ESPN.

== Writing career ==
Dave is the author of London Is The Best City In America (2006) and The Divorce Party (2008). Her novel The Last Thing He Told Me was released in 2021 and became an instant #1 New York Times best seller, remaining on the list for more than 80 weeks. It has sold over 5 million copies worldwide. Dave's fiction and essays have been published in The New York Times, The New York Observer, ESPN, Redbook, and The Huffington Post. She most often writes about relationships, family, infidelity, and marriage. She has appeared on CBS's The Early Show, Fox News Channel's Fox & Friends and NPR's All Things Considered. In 2008, Cosmopolitan named her a "Fun and Fearless Phenom of the Year".

Dave's 8th novel, The First Time I Saw Him, was published in January 2026. It is the sequel to The Last Thing He Told Me.

== Personal life ==
Dave is married to screenwriter Josh Singer. They reside in Los Angeles.

== Works ==
=== Novels ===
- London Is The Best City In America (2006) ISBN 978-0-14-303850-4
- The Divorce Party (2008) ISBN 978-0-14-311560-1
- The First Husband (2011) ISBN 978-0-670-02267-0
- Eight Hundred Grapes (2015) ISBN 978-1-4767-8925-5
- Hello, Sunshine (2017) ISBN 978-1-4767-8932-3
- The Last Thing He Told Me (2021) ISBN 978-1-5011-7134-5
- The Night We Lost Him (2024) ISBN 978-1-6680-0293-3
- The First Time I Saw Him (2025) ISBN 978-1-6680-0296-4

=== Adaptations ===
In 2006, Universal Studios optioned the rights to London Is The Best City In America as a starring vehicle for Reese Witherspoon. In 2008, Universal Studios also optioned The Divorce Party in conjunction with Echo Films, Jennifer Aniston's production company. In 2020, Reese Witherspoon's Hello Sunshine optioned The Last Thing He Told Me to be produced as a limited series on Apple TV+ starring Jennifer Garner. The series premiered April 14, 2023. In March 2024, a second season—based on the sequel, The First Time I Saw Him—was announced and is scheduled to premiere on Apple TV+ on February 20, 2026.
