= 2020 Goodreads Choice Awards =

Literary awards

- Date: December 8, 2020
- Presented by: Goodreads
- Website: Official website

The 2020 Goodreads Choice Awards were the twelfth edition of the Goodreads Choice Awards. The awards were presented by the website Goodreads, voted by the users. The editorial team of Goodreads curated fifteen books each category, published from November 16, 2019, to November 17, 2020. The winners were announced on December 8, 2020, through several rounds of voting. A total of 5,674,480 votes were cast.

Matt Haig's speculative novel The Midnight Library won the Best Fiction award, surpassing Anxious People by Fredrik Backman by only five votes.

== Winners ==
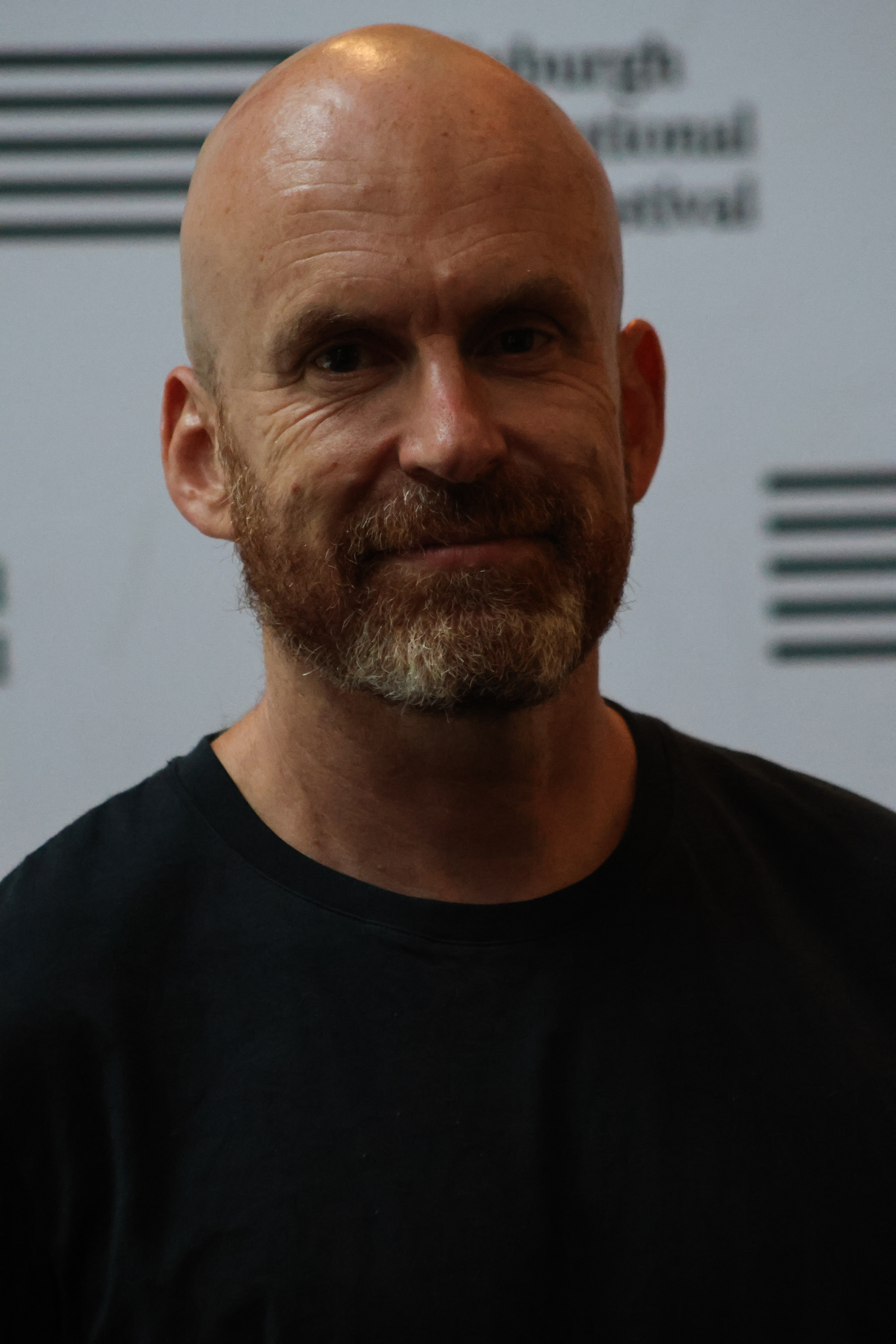
Matt Haig, Best Fiction winner

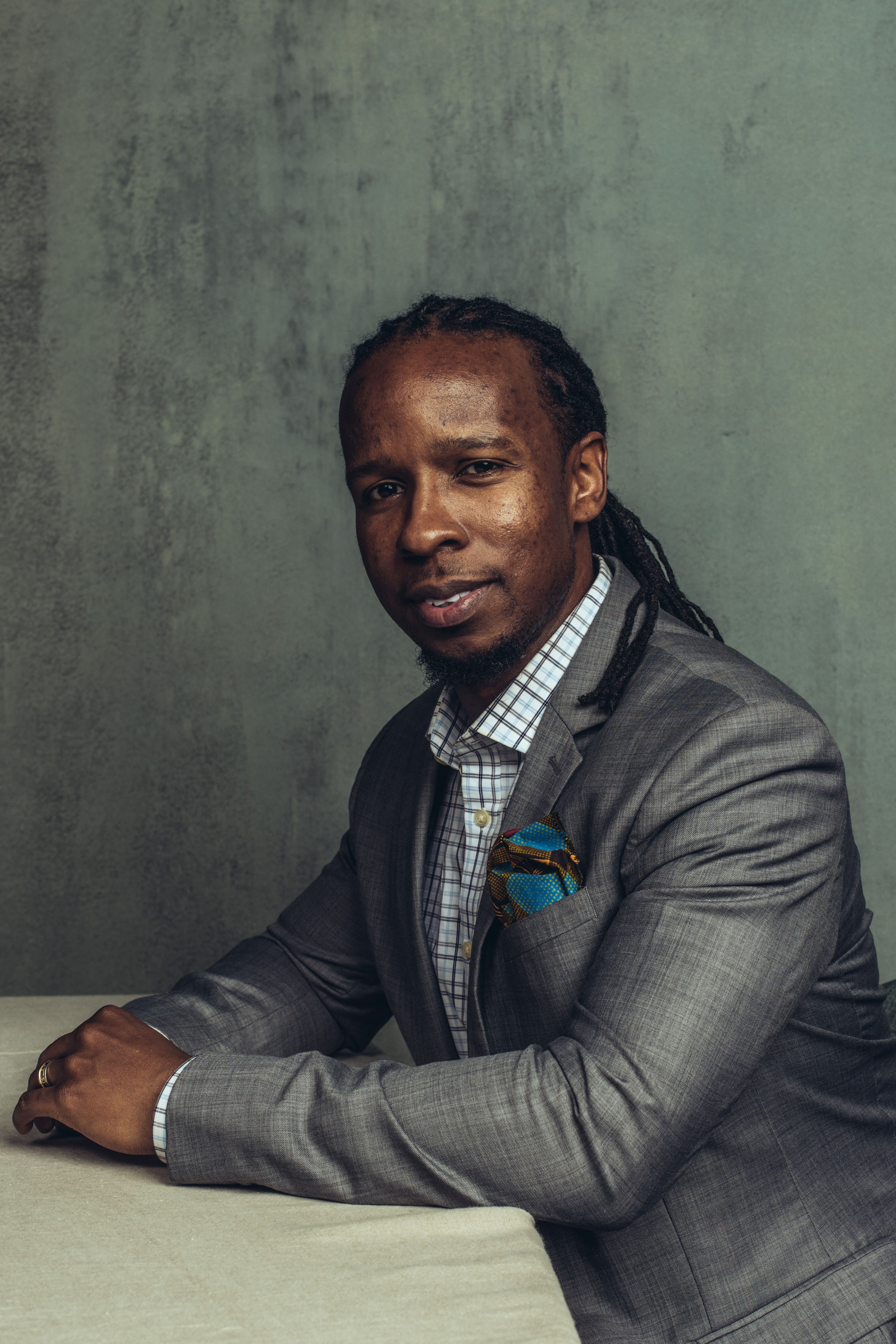
Ibram X. Kendi, Best Nonfiction co-winner

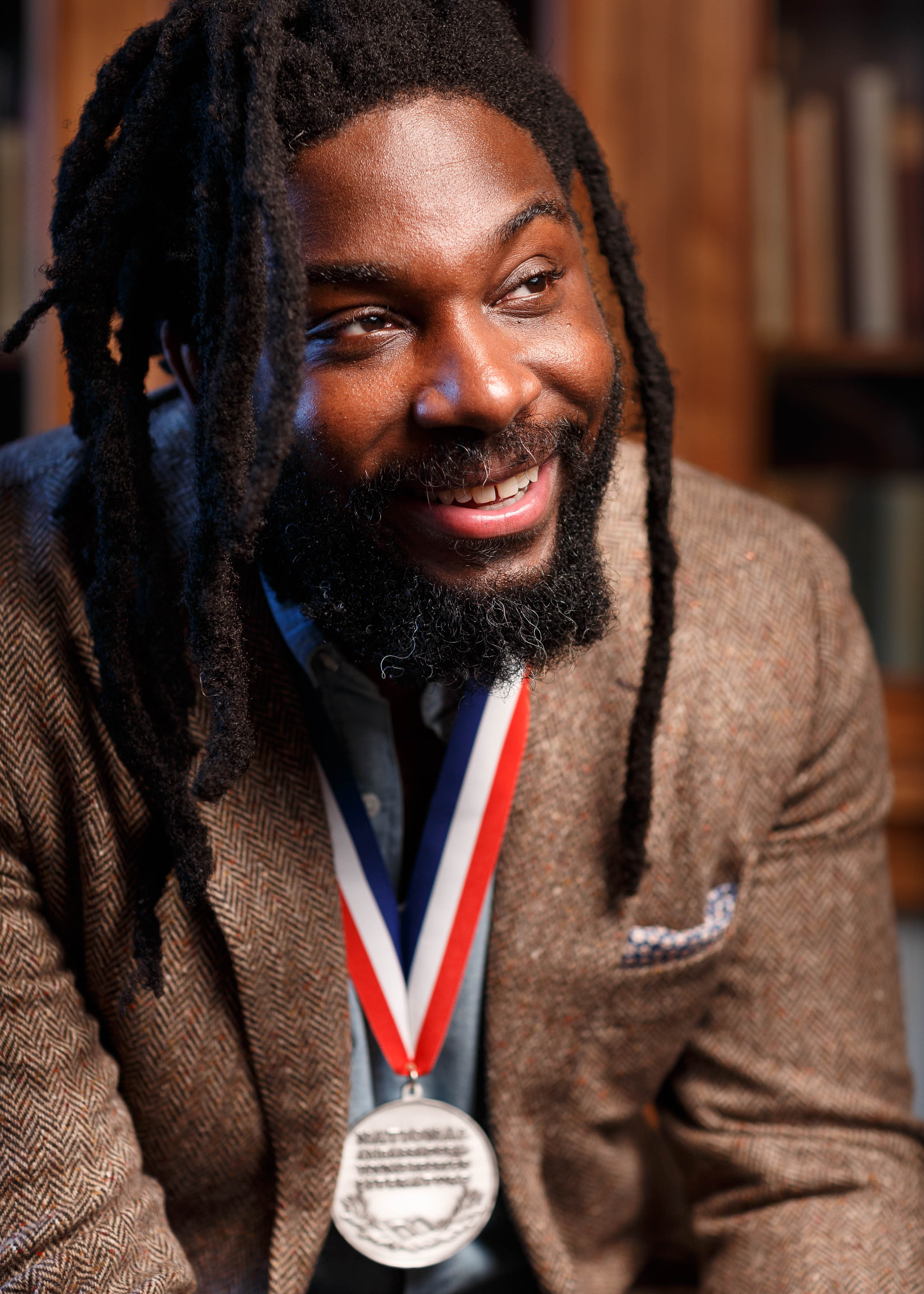
Jason Reynolds, Best Nonfiction co-winner

Winners are listed first and highlighted with boldface. Other books in the final round of voting are listed in descending order of the number of votes received.

**Fiction**: 1. **The Midnight Library by Matt Haig**‡; 2. Anxious People by Fredrik Backman; 3. American Dirt by Jeanine Cummins; 4. Such a Fun Age by Kiley Reid; 5. My Dark Vanessa by Kate Elizabeth Russell; 6. The Glass Hotel by Emily St. John Mandel; 7. Transcendent Kingdom by Yaa Gyasi; 8. The Girl with the Louding Voice by Abi Daré; 9. Dear Edward by Ann Napolitano; 10. Big Summer by Jennifer Weiner	**Nonfiction**: 1. **Stamped: Racism, Antiracism, and You by Ibram X. Kendi and Jason Reynolds**‡; 2. Hood Feminism by Mikki Kendall; 3. Clanlands by Sam Heughan and Graham McTavish; 4. Rage by Bob Woodward; 5. Me and White Supremacy by Layla Saad; 6. Hidden Valley Road by Robert Kolker; 7. Don't Overthink It by Anne Bogel; 8. Get Out of Your Head by Jennie Allen; 9. Buy Yourself the F*cking Lilies by Tara Schuster; 10. Why We Can't Sleep by Ada Calhoun
**Mystery & Thriller**: 1. **The Guest List by Lucy Foley**‡; 2. Home Before Dark by Riley Sager; 3. The Sun Down Motel by Simone St. James; 4. When No One Is Watching by Alyssa Cole; 5. The Wives by Tarryn Fisher; 6. The Searcher by Tana French; 7. The Boy from the Woods by Harlan Coben; 8. One by One by Ruth Ware; 9. The Devil and the Dark Water by Stuart Turton; 10. Long Bright River by Liz Moore	**Historical Fiction**: 1. **The Vanishing Half by Brit Bennett**‡; 2. The Jane Austen Society by Natalie Jenner; 3. The Book of Longings by Sue Monk Kidd; 4. The Book of Last Names by Kristin Harmel; 5. The Henna Artist by Alka Joshi; 6. The Evening and the Morning by Ken Follett; 7. A Long Petal of the Sea by Isabel Allende; 8. Magic Lessons by Alice Hoffman; 9. The Book of Lost Friends by Lisa Wingate; 10. The Pull of the Stars by Emma Donoghue
**Fantasy**: 1. **House of Earth and Blood by Sarah J. Maas**‡; 2. The Invisible Life of Addie LaRue by V. E. Schwab; 3. The House in the Cerulean Sea by TJ Klune; 4. Rhythm of War by Brandon Sanderson; 5. The City We Became by N. K. Jemisin; 6. The Once and Future Witches by Alix E. Harrow; 7. Piranesi by Susanna Clarke; 8. A Deadly Education by Naomi Novik; 9. The Empire of Gold by S. A. Chakraborty; 10. Peace Talks by Jim Butcher	**Romance**: 1. **From Blood and Ash by Jennifer L. Armentrout**‡; 2. Beach Read by Emily Henry; 3. In Five Years by Rebecca Serle; 4. Regretting You by Colleen Hoover; 5. Boyfriend Material by Alexis Hall; 6. Take a Hint, Dani Brown by Talia Hibbert; 7. One to Watch by Kate Stayman-London; 8. The Happy Ever After Playlist by Abby Jimenez; 9. The Switch by Beth O'Leary; 10. You Had Me at Hola by Alexis Daria
**Science Fiction**: 1. **To Sleep in a Sea of Stars by Christopher Paolini**‡; 2. Harrow the Ninth by Tamsyn Muir; 3. Network Effect by Martha Wells; 4. The Space Between Worlds by Micaiah Johnson; 5. A Beautifully Foolish Endeavor by Hank Green; 6. Axiom's End by Lindsay Ellis; 7. The Hidden Girl and Other Stories by Ken Liu; 8. Riot Baby by Tochi Onyebuchi; 9. The New Wilderness by Diane Cook; 10. The End of October by Lawrence Wright	**Science & Technology**: 1. **A Life on Our Planet by David Attenborough**‡; 2. How to Argue with a Racist by Adam Rutherford; 3. Breath: The New Science of a Lost Art by James Nestor; 4. Entangled Life by Merlin Sheldrake; 5. The End of Everything by Katie Mack; 6. No Filter: The Inside Story of Instagram by Sarah Frier; 7. The Future We Choose: Surviving the Climate Crisis by Christiana Figueres and Tom Rivett-Carnac; 8. Why Fish Don't Exist by Lulu Miller; 9. Why We Swim by Bonnie Tsui; 10. Vesper Flights by Helen Macdonald
**Horror**: 1. **Mexican Gothic by Silvia Moreno-Garcia**‡; 2. If It Bleeds by Stephen King; 3. The Southern Book Club's Guide to Slaying Vampires by Grady Hendrix; 4. The Year of the Witching by Alexis Henderson; 5. The Only Good Indians by Stephen Graham Jones; 6. Devolution by Max Brooks; 7. The Hollow Places by T. Kingfisher; 8. Plain Bad Heroines by Emily M. Danforth; 9. Malorie by Josh Malerman; 10. Tender Is the Flesh by Agustina Bazterrica	**Humor**: 1. **Strange Planet by Nathan W. Pyle**‡; 2. Wow, No Thank You. by Samantha Irby; 3. Solutions and Other Problems by Allie Brosh; 4. A Very Punchable Face by Colin Jost; 5. The Office: The Untold Story of the Greatest Sitcom of the 2000s: An Oral History by Andy Greene; 6. Trixie and Katya's Guide to Modern Womanhood by Trixie Mattel and Katya Zamolodchikova; 7. F*ck Your Diet: And Other Things My Thighs Tell Me by Chloé Hilliard; 8. Is This Anything? by Jerry Seinfeld; 9. The New One: Painfully True Stories from a Reluctant Dad by Mike Birbiglia; 10. Becoming Duchess Goldblatt by Duchess Goldblatt
**Memoir & Autobiography**: 1. **A Promised Land by Barack Obama**‡; 2. Untamed by Glennon Doyle; 3. All Boys Aren't Blue by George M. Johnson; 4. The Answer Is... by Alex Trebek; 5. Too Much and Never Enough by Mary L. Trump; 6. Open Book by Jessica Simpson; 7. The Meaning of Mariah Carey by Mariah Carey with Michaela Angela Davis; 8. Everything Beautiful in Its Time by Jenna Bush Hager; 9. The Beauty in Breaking by Michele Harper; 10. Hollywood Park by Mikel Jollett	**History & Biography**: 1. **Caste: The Origins of Our Discontents by Isabel Wilkerson**‡; 2. The Splendid and the Vile by Erik Larson; 3. A Black Women's History of the United States by Daina Ramey Berry and Kali Nicole Gross; 4. The House of Kennedy by James Patterson and Cynthia Fagen; 5. 999: The Extraordinary Young Women of the First Official Jewish Transport to Auschwitz by Heather Dune Macadam; 6. You Never Forget Your First by Alexis Coe; 7. Fight of the Century by Michael Chabon and Ayelet Waldman; 8. The Address Book by Deirdre Mask; 9. His Truth Is Marching On by Jon Meacham; 10. The Lincoln Conspiracy by Brad Meltzer and Josh Mensch
**Food & Cookbooks**: 1. **Modern Comfort Food: A Barefoot Contessa Cookbook by Ina Garten**‡; 2. Quick and Delicious by Gordon Ramsay; 3. Magnolia Table: A Collection of Recipes for Gathering, Volume 2 by Joanna Gaines; 4. 100 Cookies by Sarah Kieffer; 5. Eat a Peach by David Chang; 6. Outlander Kitchen by Diana Gabaldon; 7. Evolving Vegan by Mena Massoud; 8. Ottolenghi Flavor by Yotam Ottolenghi; 9. Frontier Follies by Ree Drummond; 10. Vegetable Kingdom by Bryant Terry	**Graphic Novels & Comics**: 1. **Heartstopper: Volume Three by Alice Oseman**‡; 2. Fangs by Sarah Andersen; 3. I Will Judge You by Your Bookshelf by Grant Snider; 4. Fangirl, Vol. 1: The Manga by Sam Maggs; 5. Sapiens: A Graphic History, Volume 1 - The Birth of Humankind by Yuval Noah Harari, David Vandermeulen, and Daniel Casanave; 6. Harleen by Stjepan Šejić; 7. Check, Please! Book 2: Sticks & Scones by Ngozi Ukazu; 8. Teen Titans: Beast Boy by Kami Garcia; 9. Basketful of Heads by Joe Hill; 10. The Times I Knew I Was Gay by Eleanor Crewes
**Poetry**: 1. **Dearly by Margaret Atwood**‡; 2. Violet Bent Backwards over the Grass by Lana Del Rey; 3. Break Your Glass Slippers by Amanda Lovelace; 4. Swimming Lessons: Poems by Lili Reinhart; 5. Home Body by Rupi Kaur; 6. On the Horizon by Lois Lowry; 7. The Girl and the Goddess by Nikita Gill; 8. Homie by Danez Smith; 9. All Along You Were Blooming by Morgan Harper Nichols; 10. What Kind of Woman by Kate Baer	**Debut Novel**: 1. **Such a Fun Age by Kiley Reid**‡; 2. Cemetery Boys by Aiden Thomas; 3. My Dark Vanessa by Kate Elizabeth Russell; 4. The Jane Austen Society by Natalie Jenner; 5. The Girl with the Louding Voice by Abi Daré; 6. The Year of the Witching by Alexis Henderson; 7. One to Watch by Kate Stayman-London; 8. The Henna Artist by Alka Joshi; 9. The Bone Shard Daughter by Andrea Stewart; 10. Valentine by Elizabeth Wetmore
**Young Adult Fiction**: 1. **Clap When You Land by Elizabeth Acevedo**‡; 2. A Good Girl's Guide to Murder by Holly Jackson; 3. One of Us Is Next by Karen M. McManus; 4. Felix Ever After by Kacen Callender; 5. You Should See Me in a Crown by Leah Johnson; 6. The Inheritance Games by Jennifer Lynn Barnes; 7. The Hand on the Wall by Maureen Johnson; 8. Majesty by Katharine McGee; 9. Tweet Cute by Emma Lord; 10. The Gravity of Us by Phil Stamper	**Young Adult Fantasy**: 1. **The Queen of Nothing by Holly Black**‡; 2. The Ballad of Songbirds and Snakes by Suzanne Collins; 3. Chain of Gold by Cassandra Clare; 4. Midnight Sun by Stephenie Meyer; 5. Children of Virtue and Vengeance by Tomi Adeyemi; 6. Cemetery Boys by Aiden Thomas; 7. Starsight by Brandon Sanderson; 8. Fable by Adrienne Young; 9. Cinderella is Dead by Kalynn Bayron; 10. Legendborn by Tracy Deonn
**Middle Grade & Children's**: 1. **The Tower of Nero by Rick Riordan**‡; 2. The One and Only Bob by Katherine Applegate; 3. Before the Ever After by Jacqueline Woodson; 4. One True King by Soman Chainani; 5. Hollowpox: The Hunt for Morrigan Crow by Jessica Townsend; 6. From the Desk of Zoe Washington by Janae Marks; 7. We Dream of Space by Erin Entrada Kelly; 8. The List of Things That Will Not Change by Rebecca Stead; 9. Ghost Squad by Claribel A. Ortega; 10. Ali Cross by James Patterson	**Picture Books**: 1. **Antiracist Baby by Ibram X. Kendi and Ashley Lukashevsky**‡; 2. Just Like Me by Vanessa Brantley-Newton; 3. The Cool Bean by Jory John and Pete Oswald; 4. The Serious Goose by Jimmy Kimmel; 5. This Book Is Gray by Lindsay Ward; 6. Sweet Child o' Mine by Guns N' Roses and Jennifer Zivoin; 7. I Am Every Good Thing by Derrick Barnes and Gordon C. James; 8. The Seed of Compassion by Dalai Lama XIV and Bao Luu; 9. The Oldest Student by Rita Lorraine Hubbard; 10. Bird Hugs by Ged Adamson
