= Showing Up for Racial Justice =

American anti-racist organization

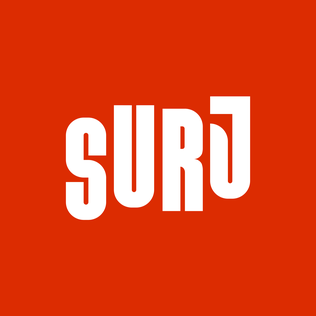
- Formation: 2009
- Website: surj.org

Showing Up for Racial Justice (SURJ) is a network organizing white people for racial and economic justice. SURJ was founded in 2009 after election of Barack Obama as the first black President of the United States. The organization states its goal as recruiting more white people into racial justice work and to find "mutual interest" with movements led by black people and people of color.

== History ==
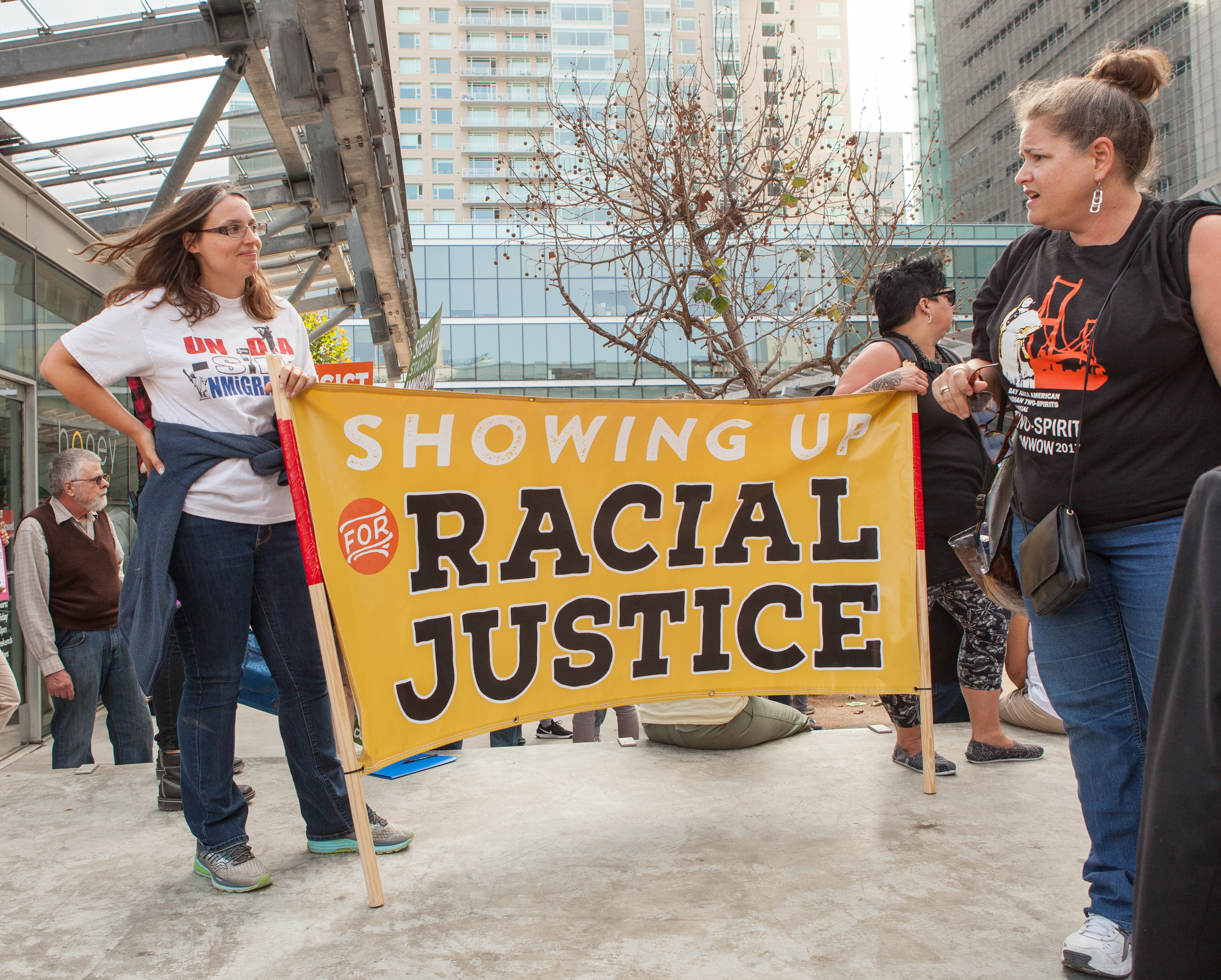
Protesters hold a SURJ banner.

Showing Up for Racial Justice was founded in 2009 by organizers Carla F. Wallace and Pam McMichael, who was then the head of the Highlander Research and Education Center. Wallace says that the aim of SURJ is to engage white people in racial justice movements led by people of color. She said the organization aims for white participants to find "mutual interest" in sustained racial justice work rather than an occasional volunteer activity framed in terms of productively using white privilege.

=== Tactics ===
SURJ uses deep canvassing, having extended conversations with personal narratives to encourage white support for racial justice. SURJ describes its approach as “calling in” white people to support racial justice grounded in the vision of Black leaders. SURJ has called for white people to take responsibility for anti-racism education rather than relying on people of color for instruction. However, some Black Lives Matter organizers critiqued SURJ's approach of creating spaces where white people can feel comfortable talking about race as implying there are places where racism can remain unchallenged.

=== Criminal justice reform ===
Following the George Floyd protests against police brutality, SURJ created materials designed to help supporters discuss protests and police violence with family members. The Louisville chapter promoted speaking up about the criminal justice system and challenge assumption of agreement. Other actions include electoral work, citing sheriffs' potential role in criminal legal system and mass incarceration reforms. SURJ also campaigns to end cash bail.

=== Police accountability ===
SURJ called for increased police accountability and oversight in the San Diego County jail. SURJ was part of the Citizens for a Safer Cleveland coalition, which supported a police accountability initiative that created a new Community Policing Commission composed of 13 civilians with final decision-making power regarding discipline in police misconduct cases. In the debate over license plate readers, Melissa Cherry from Nashville chapter of SURJ said she was suspicious of private funding for law enforcement with discussion of defunding the police.

== See also ==
- Black Lives Matter
- Me and White Supremacy
- Anne Braden
