= We Dream of Space =

2020 children's novel about a dysfunctional family

- Author: Erin Entrada Kelly
- Language: English
- Publisher: Greenwillow
- Publication date: 2020
- Publication place: United States
- Pages: 400
- ISBN: 9780062747303

We Dream of Space is a 2020 children's novel by Erin Entrada Kelly. It explores the lives of three 7th graders and their dysfunctional family in the lead up to and aftermath of the Space Shuttle Challenger disaster. Kelly earned a Newbery Honor for the book in 2021, after previously winning the medal for Hello, Universe in 2018.

== Summary ==
In January 1986, three siblings, brothers Cash and Fitch, and Fitch's twin-sister Bernadette ("Bird"), grow distant as their parents' marriage becomes increasingly fraught with arguments and bickering. Cash has been held back in the 7th grade, joining his younger siblings, and feels like a failure; Fitch spends most of his time playing games at the arcade to avoid people and struggles to control his anger at school; and Bird is regularly bagdered by her mother about dieting.

Ms. Salonga, Bird's science teacher, enters but loses NASA's Teacher in Space Project contest. Undeterred, she leverages the approaching launch of the Space Shuttle Challenger at the end of the month to encourage the children's interest in space. Bird soon begins imagining conversations with Judith Resnik and daydreams of becoming an astronaut. After the Space Shuttle explodes during launch, the three children come together to support one another.
