= The First State of Being =

2024 children's novel about a time-traveling boy

- Author: Erin Entrada Kelly
- Language: English
- Genre: Time travel
- Publisher: Greenwillow
- Publication date: 2024
- Publication place: United States
- Pages: 272
- ISBN: 9780063337312

The First State of Being is a 2024 children's time travel novel by Erin Entrada Kelly. Set in the lead-up to Y2K, it follows a young boy who discovers a strange teenager who claims to be from the future. Kelly earned the Newbery Medal in 2025 for the book, her second medal and her third recognition; it was also a finalist for the National Book Award for Young People's Literature in 2024.

== Summary ==
In 1999, 12-year-old Michael is preparing for Y2K when he meets the mysterious boy Ridge, an out-of-place teenager who dresses and speaks queerly and claims to be from the future. Incredulous, Michael changes his mind after Ridge accurately predicts an earthquake; Ridge has actually time-traveled backward from the year 2199 using a time machine invented by his mother and motivated by a dare from his siblings. Michael decides to help Ridge find his way back to the future by helping to locate the time machine.

Awards
Preceded by The Eyes and the Impossible	Newbery Medal recipient 2025	Succeeded by All the Blues in the Sky
