= TJ Klune =

American author (born 1982)

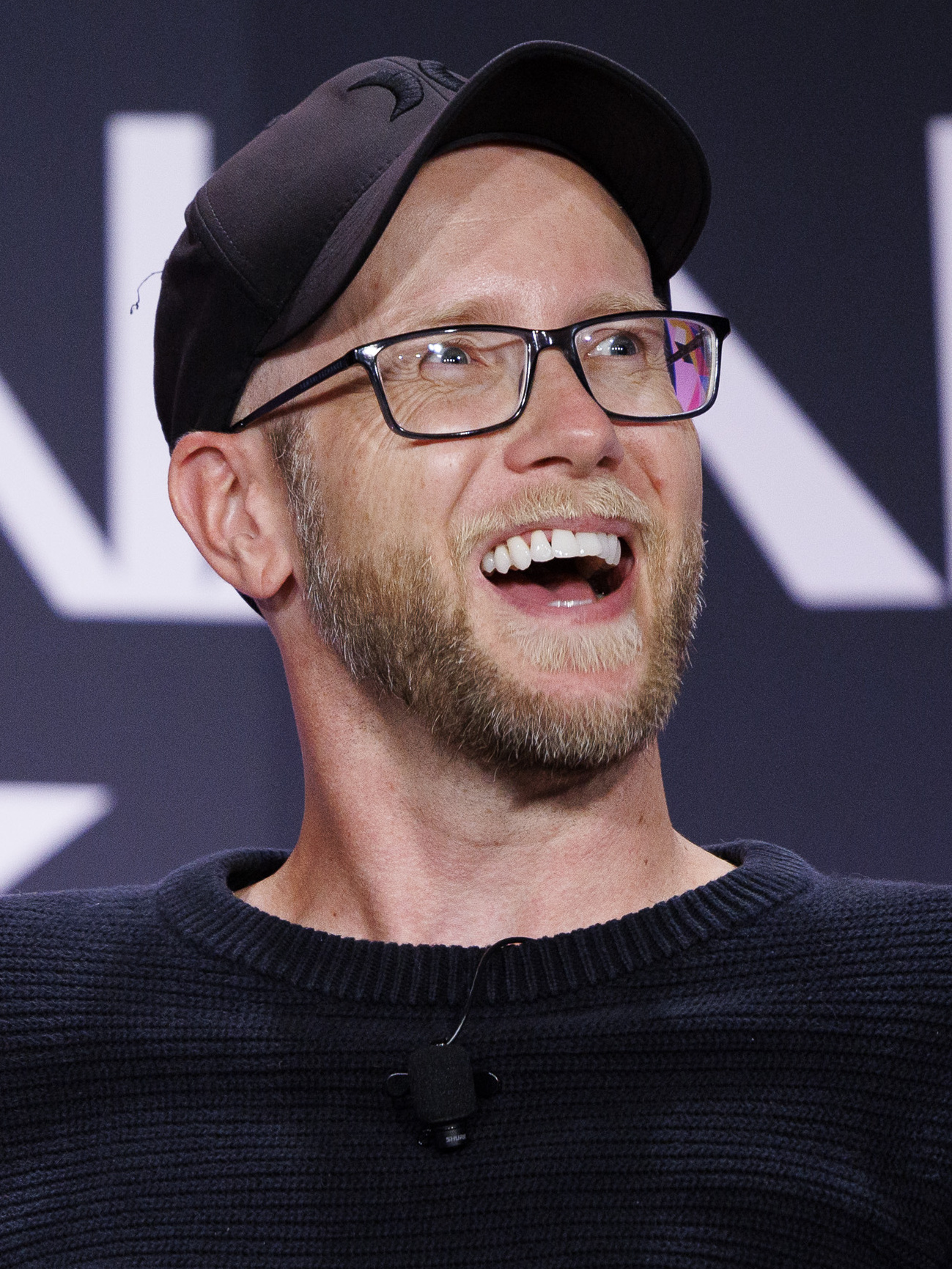
- Klune at the 2023 National Book Festival
- Born: Travis John Klune; May 20, 1982 (age 44); Roseburg, Oregon, U.S.
- Occupation: Novelist
- Writing career
- Language: English
- Genres: fantasy; romance
- Movement: LGBT literature
- Website: www.tjklunebooks.com

Travis John Klune (born May 20, 1982) is an American author of fantasy and romantic fiction featuring gay and LGBTQ+ characters. His fantasy novel The House in the Cerulean Sea is a New York Times best seller and winner of the 2021 Alex and Mythopoeic Awards. He also won the Lambda Literary Award for Gay Romance in 2014 with Into This River I Drown. The sequel to The House in the Cerulean Sea, Somewhere Beyond the Sea (2024), reached number one on the New York Times hardcover fiction list, and the two novels had sold more than two million copies worldwide by 2026.

== Personal life ==
Klune was born in Roseburg, Oregon. He was eight years old when he first began to write fiction. His young works in poetry and short stories were the first to be published. Klune's writing influences include Stephen King, Wilson Rawls, Patricia Nell Warren, Robert McCammon, and Terry Pratchett.

Klune, who has attention-deficit/hyperactivity disorder (ADHD), has been open about his lived experiences with asexuality, queerness, and neurodiversity influencing his writing. The historical absence of these communities in fiction has motivated Klune's character development choices.

In 2013, Klune proposed to author Eric Arvin at the GayRomLit Conference in Atlanta, Georgia. The two had met for the first time in person one year earlier at the 2012 GayRomLit Conference in Albuquerque, New Mexico. Arvin endured many years of health struggles and died on December 12, 2016.

== Career ==
Klune's writing began when, as a child in the 1980s, he wrote fan fiction about his favorite video game, Metroid. Later in his childhood, he started writing original stories. His teachers encouraged his work, saying they looked forward to seeing his writing in bookstores one day.

Klune's first book, Bear, Otter and the Kid, was published in 2011. Due to the prevalence of pen names among authors of men's romantic fiction, he wrote under the name TJ Klune. His motivation for his first book came from a realization of the poor, often offensive stereotypes of queer characters in stories. He aimed to write a novel that portrayed queer relationships in a way that was relatable, positive, and free from stereotypes. Amazon noted Bear, Otter and the Kid as one of the top LGBTQ+ books of 2011.

In 2013, Klune wrote a magical realism novel, Into This River I Drown, while processing the death of his father. A supernatural tale about grief and love in a small town, it won the 2014 Lambda Literary Award for Best Gay Romance. Other novels written by Klune include the queer werewolf series Green Creek, the queer superhero series The Extraordinaries, the contemporary romance How to Be a Normal Person, and the comedic fantasy series Tales from Verania.

The House in the Cerulean Sea, published with the Macmillan Tor imprint, was partially inspired by the Sixties Scoop, during which the Canadian government forcibly removed Indigenous children from their homes and placed them with unrelated, White, middle-class families. Klune saw similarities to events taking place in the Southern United States in 2020, saying "It’s terrifying to know it is still happening". Instead of focusing on forced removals, Klune wanted to write a story celebrating children's differences, and showing the positive effects of giving children a safe and supportive environment to develop. The book is about a man named Linus Baker who travels to Marsyas Island as a representative of the Department in Charge of Magical Youth. The island is home to six magical kids, including Lucifer (a.k.a. Lucy), the son of the Devil. Klune promoted the story as "something to read that will make you feel good … a slice of happiness".

The use of the Sixties Scoop as the starting point for an uplifting fantasy has drawn criticism. A 2025 article in the journal Ex-Centric Narratives called the choice problematic and observed that the novel never names the Sixties Scoop, the residential school system or Canadian colonial policy.

Klune was signed with the Macmillan Tor imprint Tor Teen for two more standalone young adult (YA) novels as of June 2018.

Klune's first publisher was Dreamspinner Press, which issued Bear, Otter and the Kid and many of his later romances. In March 2019 he said he would leave the company after delivering three more books, and in September 2019 he stated that it owed him $27,448 in royalties and that he planned to involve a lawyer. Later that month he announced that he had taken back the rights to his books, which he then republished himself.

In August 2022, Tor Books announced that it had acquired nine books from Klune: new editions of The Bones Beneath My Skin and the four Green Creek novels, along with four new novels. The Green Creek reissues began with Wolfsong in July 2023, and Tor's edition of The Bones Beneath My Skin entered national bestseller lists in February 2025. Klune's novelette "Reduce! Reuse! Recycle!" was published by Reactor in June 2024.

Somewhere Beyond the Sea, a sequel to The House in the Cerulean Sea, was published in September 2024 and reached number one on the New York Times hardcover fiction best-seller list. Klune told Library Journal that he wrote the sequel in response to rising hostility toward LGBTQ people, and toward transgender people in particular. In the book's acknowledgments he calls himself the "anti-J.K. Rowling", and he has publicly criticized J. K. Rowling's statements about transgender people.

We Burned So Bright, a short novel in which an older gay couple set out on a road trip as the end of the world nears, was published by Tor in April 2026. A Tor hardcover edition of his 2016 novel Murmuration was scheduled for November 17, 2026. In January 2026, Tor Publishing Group announced a commercial fiction imprint, Wildthorn Books, which is to launch in January 2027 with Klune's novel The Stars Look Like Home, a story told from the point of view of a dog.

In April 2026, TheWrap reported that Warner Bros. Animation was developing an animated television series based on The House in the Cerulean Sea, with no creative team or distributor yet named. According to the report, the two Cerulean Chronicles novels had sold more than two million copies worldwide.

== Awards and critical reception ==
Year (Note: Year of award.)	Work	Award	Category	Result	Ref.
2014	Into This River I Drown	Lambda Literary Award	Gay Romance	Won	
2020	The House in the Cerulean Sea	Goodreads Choice Awards	Fantasy	Nominated—3rd	
2021	The House in the Cerulean Sea	Alex Award (Note: The Alex Awards are given to books written for adults that have special appeal to young adults.)	—	Won	
2021	The House in the Cerulean Sea	Mythopoeic Fantasy Award	Adult Literature	Won	
2021	The House in the Cerulean Sea	RUSA CODES Reading List	Fantasy	Won	
2021	Under the Whispering Door	Goodreads Choice Awards	Fantasy	Nominated—2nd	
2022	Under the Whispering Door	Locus Award	Fantasy Novel	Nominated	
2023	In the Lives of Puppets	Goodreads Choice Awards	Science Fiction	Won	
2024	Somewhere Beyond the Sea	Goodreads Choice Awards	Fantasy	Won	
2025	Somewhere Beyond the Sea	BSFA Award	Fiction for Younger Readers	Shortlisted	
2025	Somewhere Beyond the Sea	Locus Award	Fantasy Novel	Finalist	
2025	"Reduce! Reuse! Recycle!"	Locus Award	Novelette	Finalist	
2025	"Reduce! Reuse! Recycle!"	Theodore Sturgeon Memorial Award	—	Finalist—3rd	

Klune's YA debut, The Extraordinaries, was praised by Kirkus Reviews for its use of superhero and fan fiction tropes, while Publishers Weekly compliments Klune on writing a teenaged character with ADHD in a positive and supportive light.

The House in the Cerulean Sea was a New York Times best seller and was named by The Washington Post as one of "2020's Best Feel-Good Reads". Publishers Weekly called it a "thought-provoking Orwellian fantasy" in its starred review. Kirkus praised Klune for creating enduring characters. The novel was named one of Amazon's Best Books of the Year in its science fiction and fantasy section in 2020.

Klune was nominated as an all-time favourite M/M romance author on the book review website Goodreads in 2017. He is also an advocate for better LGBTQ+ representation in novels, wishing to see more asexual characters like himself reflected in fiction.

== Novels ==
Bibliography
Series	Title	Year	Ref.
Seafare Series	Bear, Otter, and the Kid	2011	
Seafare Series	Who We Are	2012	
Seafare Series	The Art of Breathing	2014	
Seafare Series	The Long and Winding Road	2017	
At First Sight	Tell Me It’s Real	2013	
At First Sight	The Queen & the Homo Jock King	2016	
At First Sight	Until You	2017	
At First Sight	Why We Fight	2019	
Tales from Verania	The Lightning-Struck Heart	2015	
Tales from Verania	A Destiny of Dragons	2017	
Tales from Verania	The Consumption of Magic	2017	
Tales from Verania	A Wish Upon the Stars	2018	
Tales from Verania	Fairytales from Verania (collection)	2021	
Tales from Verania	The Damning Stone	2022	
How to Be	How to Be a Normal Person	2015	
How to Be	How to Be a Movie Star	2019	
Immemorial Year	Withered + Sere	2016	
Immemorial Year	Crisped + Sere	2016	
Green Creek	Wolfsong	2016	
Green Creek	Ravensong	2018	
Green Creek	Heartsong	2019	
Green Creek	Brothersong	2020	
Cerulean Chronicles	The House in the Cerulean Sea	2020	
Cerulean Chronicles	Somewhere Beyond the Sea	2024	
The Extraordinaries	The Extraordinaries	2020	
The Extraordinaries	Flash Fire	2021	
The Extraordinaries	Heat Wave	2022	
Standalone novels	Burn	2012	
Standalone novels	Into This River I Drown	2013	
Standalone novels	John & Jackie	2014	
Standalone novels	Murmuration	2016	
Standalone novels	Olive Juice	2017	
Standalone novels	The Bones Beneath My Skin	2018	
Standalone novels	Under the Whispering Door	2021	
Standalone novels	In the Lives of Puppets	2023	
Standalone novels	We Burned So Bright	2026	
Standalone novels	The Stars Look Like Home	2027 (Note: Scheduled for publication in January 2027.)	
