= Zoe Washington series =

Middle grade novel series by Janae Marks

The Zoe Washington series is a series of middle grade novels by Janae Marks, consisting of the following books: From the Desk of Zoe Washington (2020) and On Air with Zoe Washington (2023). Several outlets included From the Desk of Zoe Washington in their list of the best children's books of 2020. It is also slated to be adapted into a film by Disney Branded Television.

== From the Desk of Zoe Washington (2019) ==
From the Desk of Zoe Washington was published January 14, 2020 by Katherine Tegen Books. It has also been adapted into an audiobook narrated by Bahni Turpin.

=== Critical reception ===
From the Desk of Zoe Washington was generally well received by critics, including starred reviews from Booklist, Kirkus Reviews, Publishers Weekly, and School Library Journal.

Booklist's Shaunterria Owens highlights how "Marks tells this story of forgiveness and redemption in a way that will make sense to tween readers without being patronizing or overly complicated. The troubling ways race affects the characters ... will facilitate important conversations about racial profiling and incarceration rates for people of color. Fortunately, Marks’ capable storytelling and engaging characters also combine into a wondrous confection of a book, full of heart and hope and promise."

Kirkus Reviews called the novel "an extraordinary, timely, must-read debut about love, family, friendship, and justice."

Publishers Weekly writes, "Debut author Marks seamlessly weaves timely discussions about institutionalized racism into this uplifting and engaging story that packs an emotional punch. Zoe is a relatable tween, with friendship and familial frustrations that will resonate with readers."

School Library Journal's Elizabeth Giles called the book "a smart, necessary, and hopeful middle grade debut that expertly balances a gentle, heartwarming tone with searing insight into systemic racism." Giles recommended it for readers who enjoy Lisa Ramee’s A Good Kind of Trouble and Kekla Magoon’s The Season of Styx Malone.

=== Awards and honors ===
Both the book and audiobook editions of From the Desk of Zoe Washington are Junior Library Guild selections.

The Chicago Public Library, Kirkus Reviews, Parents, School Library Journal named From the Desk of Zoe Washington one of the best middle grade novels of 2020, and Booklist included it on their 2020 "Top 10 First Novels for Youth" list. Bank Street College of Education also included the novel on their list of the best books of 2021.

Awards for From the Desk of Zoe Washington
Year	Award	Result	Ref.
2020	Cybils Award for Middle Grade Fiction	Winner	
2020	Goodreads Choice Award for Middle Grade & Children's	Nominee	
2020	New England Book Award for Middle Grade	Finalist	
2021	Agatha Award for Children's/Young Adult Mystery	Nominee	
2021	ALSC Notable Children's Books	Selection	
2021	ALSC Notable Children's Recordings	Selection	
2021	Amazing Audiobooks for Young Adults	Selection	
2021	Anthony Award for Best Juvenile / Young Adult	Nominee	
2021	Edgar Allan Poe Award for Best Juvenile	Finalist	
2022	Rebecca Caudill Young Readers' Book Award	Finalist	

=== Film adaptation ===
On August 18, 2021, Disney Branded Television announced they would be adapting From the Desk of Zoe Washington into a full-length film directed by Kerry Washington and Pilar Savone. On November 17, 2022, author Janae Marks revealed that the film is still in pre-production and the screenwriter is still working on the script.

== On Air with Zoe Washington (2023) ==
On Air with Zoe Washington was published February 14, 2023 by Katherine Tegen Books.

=== Critical reception ===
In their review, Booklist's Aryssa Damron highlights how "Marks captures the exuberance and energy of early teens in her prose and delicately balances Zoe as a likable protagonist." Kirkus Reviews called the novel "a thoughtful sequel that revisits an admirable protagonist and accessibly explores challenging subjects." School Library Journal referred to it as "a delightful and inspiring read."
