= Such a Fun Age =

2019 debut novel by Kiley Reid

- First edition cover
- Author: Kiley Reid
- Audio read by: Nicole Lewis
- Cover artist: Vi-An Nguyen
- Language: English
- Set in: Philadelphia, Pennsylvania, U.S.
- Publisher: G. P. Putnam's Sons
- Publication date: December 31, 2019
- Publication place: United States
- Media type: Print (hardcover and paperback), e-book, audio
- Pages: 320
- ISBN: 978-0-525-54190-5 (hardcover)
- OCLC: 1090706582
- Dewey Decimal: 813/.6
- LC Class: PS3618.E5363 S83 2020
- Website: kileyreid.com/such-a-fun-age

Such a Fun Age is the debut novel by American author Kiley Reid. It was published by G. P. Putnam's Sons on December 31, 2019. It tells the story of a young black woman in Philadelphia who is wrongly accused of kidnapping while babysitting a white child, and the events that follow the incident. The novel received favorable reviews and was longlisted for the 2020 Booker Prize.

== Plot ==
Alix Chamberlain is a wealthy influencer, blogger, and public speaker in her early thirties who has built a brand known as "LetHer Speak" around the practice of writing old-fashioned letters to businesses, often in exchange for free product samples and encouraging women to be assertive. Alix's family has moved from New York City to Philadelphia for her husband Peter's job as a television anchor, and her career is stalling as she raises two children and attempts to write her first book. Alix hires Emira Tucker, a 25-year-old African American college graduate, as a babysitter to care for her three-year-old daughter Briar. Alix also has an infant daughter named Catherine. Emira appreciates that Briar is a unique and rambunctious child but also notices Briar's antics irritate Alix and lead her to neglect Briar in favor of Catherine.

Alix and Peter's home is egged at night and a window is broken after Peter received backlash for making a racist remark on-air, though he insists the comment was thoughtless. Alix calls Emira, who is at a party with friends, to take Briar with her to a local, trendy supermarket while she and Peter speak with the police. At the store, Emira, her friend Zara, and Briar dance to Whitney Houston and are noticed by an older white woman. After Zara leaves, a security guard approaches Emira at the white woman's behest and questions why Emira is with Briar. Emira explains the situation but the guard refuses to believe she is a babysitter, and Emira is freed only once Peter shows up and corroborates her story. The incident is recorded by a white bystander, Kelley Copeland, who urges Emira to seek justice against the store. Emira is shaken but does not want attention; she has him email the video to her and delete it from his phone.

Alix is shocked by the incident and tries to treat Emira better, offering her extra pay and gifts, and becomes intent on developing a friendship with her, though Emira simply regards Alix as her employer. Meanwhile, Emira runs into Kelley again on the train, and the two start dating. For Thanksgiving, Alix invites Emira and her boyfriend to the Chamberlain home. Upon meeting, they realize that Alix (formerly Alex Murphy) and Kelley dated in high school and parted on bad terms. Later, Kelley tells Emira that she needs to quit her job because Alix is racist: in high school, she called the police to a party at her mansion home, indirectly causing a black student, Robbie, to lose his scholarship when he was arrested with drugs, and has a history of surrounding herself with black employees. Emira, feeling Kelley is being inconsiderate of her anxiety about her employment status and lack of professional career, refuses to quit.

Alix tells Emira that she should break up with Kelley because he fetishized black people in high school: he invited Robbie and the cool kids to the house to become friends with them and later broke up with Alix in favor of them. When Emira dismisses her advice, Alix gains access to Emira's email and leaks the video of the grocery store incident. To Emira's shock, it goes viral. Believing that Kelley leaked it, she breaks up with him. Alix comforts her and offers her a full-time job as Briar's nanny, which she accepts. Alix also arranges an interview with Emira and herself on local television.

Minutes before the interview, Emira learns that it was in fact Alix who leaked the video on social media. On air, Emira embarrasses Alix by quitting and using the same line that Kelley had used to break up with her in high school. When Alix confronts her, Emira urges Alix to be a better mother to Briar. Emira also has a heartfelt goodbye with Briar, who she's grown to love. After the interview airs, Kelley tries to contact Emira, but she does not respond. It is also revealed in a flashback that in high school Alix had left a number of notes inviting Kelley to her house, and that these notes had inadvertently ended up in Robbie's locker. Alix, upon realizing that Kelley never invited Robbie to her house as she believed, instead consciously alters her memory of the events and trains herself to believe that Kelley did invite Robbie to her house, thus leading to his arrest.

Years pass and Emira begins working as an administrative assistant. She sees Kelley with his black girlfriend and Mrs. Chamberlain with an older Briar and Catherine (where she notices that Alix seems to only be doting on Catherine) but does not approach any of them. Well into her thirties, Emira wonders what she learned from her time at the Chamberlain house and what kind of person Briar will grow up to become.

== Themes ==
Such a Fun Age deals with themes of interracial relationships, privilege, millennial anxiety, and wealth.

Reid interrogates tropes of the white savior and unknowing racist as they play out in everyday life. Throughout the novel, the white characters assume they know what is best for the protagonist, without ever seeing anything from her perspective, and speak about her with a sense of ownership. The novel satirizes what has been described as "the white pursuit of wokeness", by having the two main white characters use their relationships with Emira as the battleground through which each intends to prove their racial virtue. Reid explained that she did not think of her characters as inherently bad, conversely, that they "were dying to help, but kind of going through mental gymnastics to ignore the broken systems that put people where they are to begin with."

The novel also deals with millennial anxiety relating to job security and confusion over career choices. Over the course of the book, Emira's main concern is to find a secure job, as she will be removed from her parents' healthcare insurance cover upon turning 26. While she remains at her babysitting job, her group of friends start advancing in their careers, intensifying her desire for "a real adult job", which neither she nor her friends consider babysitting to be. In the context of Emira's job, the novel also explores emotional labor and transactional relationships. Reid stated in an interview that "the history of black women taking care of white children is at the forefront [of the book]. It's this job that is so important, with really high stakes and a very small margin of error—but also, a 13-year-old could do it."

== Background ==
Reid started writing the novel in 2015, while she was applying to graduate school, and finished it while pursuing her MFA at the University of Iowa. It was during this period that the deaths of Freddie Gray and Philando Castile took place, and Reid said she was "absolutely inspired by the everyday terror" but that, in the novel, she wanted to explore "instances of racial biases that don't end in violence as a way of highlighting those moments that we don't see on the news but still exist every day." Reid has also said that the novel was partly inspired by the years she spent in her 20s working as a babysitter.

The novel was published in the United States in hardcover and paperback by G. P. Putnam's Sons on December 31, 2019. It was published in the United Kingdom in hardcover by Bloomsbury Circus, an imprint of Bloomsbury Publishing, on January 7, 2020.

== Reception ==
Sara Collins of The Guardian gave the novel a rave review, calling it "the calling card of a virtuoso talent" and writing that it "skillfully interweaves race-related explorations with astute musings on friendship, motherhood, marriage, love and more." The novel also received praise from Kirkus Reviews and Publishers Weekly, with the latter describing it as a "nuanced portrait of a young black woman struggling to define herself apart from the white people in her life who are all too ready to speak and act on her behalf."

Hephzibah Anderson of The Observer criticized the character development of Alix Chamberlain as well as the novel's plot for "[pivoting] on an almighty coincidence" but nonetheless called it a "cracking debut" and wrote that "Reid writes with a confidence and verve that produce magnetic prose." The Boston Globe concurred, noting that the second half of the novel was based on a "contrived" coincidence but "once you buy into the path Reid chooses, she deftly ratchets up the tension and the characters always ring true."

Lauren Christensen of The New York Times Book Review gave the novel a mixed review, criticizing the plot's "many lapses in credibility" as well as Reid's "cloying vernacular".

The novel debuted at number three on The New York Times Hardcover Fiction best-sellers list.

== Awards ==
Such a Fun Age was longlisted for the 2020 Booker Prize. In the 2020 Goodreads Choice Awards, the book was nominated for Best Fiction, and won the award for Best Debut Novel.

Year	Award	Category	Result	Ref.
2020	Booker Prize	—	Longlisted	
2020	BookTube Prize	Fiction	Octofinal	
2020	Goodreads Choice Awards	Debut Novel	Won	
2020	Goodreads Choice Awards	Fiction	Fourth place	
2020	NAACP Image Awards	Debut Author	Nominated	
2020	First Novelist Award	—	Finalist	
2020	Young Lions Fiction Award	—	Finalist	
2021	Audie Awards	Fiction	Finalist	
2021	Audie Awards	Female Narrator	Finalist	
2021	Australian Book Industry Awards	International Book	Won	
2021	British Book Awards	Début Book of the Year	Shortlisted	
2021	Independent Booksellers' Book Prize	Fiction	Shortlisted	

== Adaptation ==
Lena Waithe's Hillman Grad Productions and Sight Unseen Pictures pre-emptively acquired the film and television rights to the novel in August 2018. Reid is executive producing.
