= Say You'll Remember Me =

2025 novel by Abby Jimenez

- First edition hardcover
- Author: Abby Jimenez
- Cover artist: Sarah Congdon
- Language: English
- Genre: Contemporary romance
- Publisher: Forever
- Publication date: April 1, 2025
- Publication place: United States
- Pages: 368
- ISBN: 9781538759196
- Followed by: The Night We Met

Say You'll Remember Me is a romance novel by American author Abby Jimenez. It was published by Forever on April 1, 2025. It follows Samantha Diaz and Xavier Rush, whose budding romance is challenged when Samantha must move 2,000 miles across the country. It was a number one New York Times bestseller and received positive reviews from critics. A sequel was released in 2026.

== Background ==
Jimenez stated that she wanted to write a veterinarian hero "for a really long time". She also wanted to write a romance between a grumpy and reserved man and a witty and sociable woman. Samantha's cat Pooter, a cat without an anus who led to the two crossing paths, was inspired by a viral video of a cat with a congenital defect. Samantha's mother's house is based off Jimenez's grandfather's house. The car that Samantha Diaz drives is based off a blue 1966 Dodge Dart convertible that Jimenez received as a gift from her grandfather for her sixteenth birthday.

The novel takes place in the "Abbyverse", a fan name for the fiction universe in which all of Jimenez's characters live. It is the first of her books that is not fully set in Minnesota.

== Synopsis ==
When social media manager Samantha Diaz brings her kitten Pooter to veterinarian Xavier Rush, their interaction does not go well as Xavier recommends her to euthanize the kitten, who was born without an anus and requires a surgery that costs far more than Samantha can afford. Determined to prove him wrong, Samantha crowdfunds the money over the course of four days. During her subsequent visit, Xavier apologizes and tells her he admires her commitment to animals and willingness to call him out. Six weeks later, as she contacts Xavier for a health certificate for Pooter, he asks her out. After the best date of Samantha's life, Xavier discovers that Samantha is leaving Minneapolis for Glendale, California the next day to care for her mother, who has early onset dementia. Samantha tells Xavier to move on and forget her, but they find they cannot stop thinking about each other.

== Reception ==
For the book tour promoting the novel, Jimenez reported selling out events "literally, sometimes, in 20 seconds." Her event at Des Moines quadrupled its 500 expected attendees.

The novel reached the number one position of the New York Times Combined Print & E-Book Fiction bestseller list. It spent four weeks on the list. It also reached the number one position of the Publishers Weekly bestseller list.

The novel was nominated for a Goodreads Choice Award for Romance. The audiobook, narrated by Christine Lakin and Matt Lanter, was nominated for an Audie Award for Romance.

Whitney Kramer of Library Journal called it a "[w]ell-paced" novel that "deftly tackles challenges[...] in between sweet and sexy scenes", and wrote that the secondary characters are "so well drawn that they’re practically begging for their own books." Publishers Weekly wrote that the novel "expertly weaves a beautiful budding romance with real-life struggles". Jessica Howard of Shelf Awareness called it a "heartfelt romance [that] thoughtfully explore[s] complex subjects."

== Sequels ==
A sequel titled The Night We Met was released on March 24, 2026. It focuses on a romance between Chris, one of Xavier's best friends, and a new character named Larissa. A third book focusing on a romance involving Mike, another one of Xavier's best friends, is set to release in 2027.
