= Cemetery Boys =

2020 novel by Aiden Thomas

- Author: Aiden Thomas
- Language: English
- Genre: Young adult fantasy
- Published: Swoon Reads
- Pages: 352
- ISBN: 9781250250469
- Followed by: Cemetery Boys: Espíritu

Cemetery Boys is a young adult urban fantasy novel by Aiden Thomas, published September 1, 2020 by Swoon Reads. The book's placement on the New York Times Bestseller List made history as the first book on the list by an openly transgender author featuring a transgender character.

A sequel, titled Cemetery Boys: Espíritu, was released on September 8, 2026.

== Plot ==
Yadriel is queer, trans, Latino, and a brujo (witch). Brujos are known to possess the ability to summon spirits and release them from the physical realm, whereas Brujas possess healing powers. Unfortunately, his family does not recognize him as a man, and expect him to develop healing instead of summoning abilities. Along with his cousin and best friend, Maritza, Yadriel attempts to summon the ghost of his missing cousin, who is believed to have perished. Yadriel hopes that by successfully summoning his cousin, he will prove himself a Brujo. Instead, he calls forth Julian Diaz, a boy from Yadriel's school who does not remember how he died and is not ready to move on.

== Reception ==
Before Cemetery Boys was released, it was named one of the most anticipated books of 2020 by Book Riot, Tor.com, Goodreads, Paste, and Bitch Media.

After release, book was named a best seller by the New York Times and IndieBound, and received starred reviews from Publishers Weekly and Booklist. It was also named best book of the year by Publishers Weekly, NPR, and Barnes & Noble.

Awards for Cemetery Boys
Year	Award	Result
2020	Bram Stoker Award for Best Young Adult Novel	Shortlisted
2020	Goodreads Choice Award for Young Adult Fantasy & Science Fiction	Nominee
2020	Goodreads Choice Award for Debut Novel	Nominee
2020	National Book Award	Longlisted
2020	School Library Journal (SLJ) Top 10 Audiobooks of 2020	Top Ten
2021	ALA Amazing Audiobooks for Young Adults	Top Ten
2021	ALA Best Fiction for Young Adults	
2021	ALA Rainbow Book List	Top Ten
2021	ALA Teens' Top Ten	Top Ten
2021	Locus Award for Best First Novel	Nominee
2021	Lodestar Award	Finalist
