= Alka Joshi =

Indian novelist

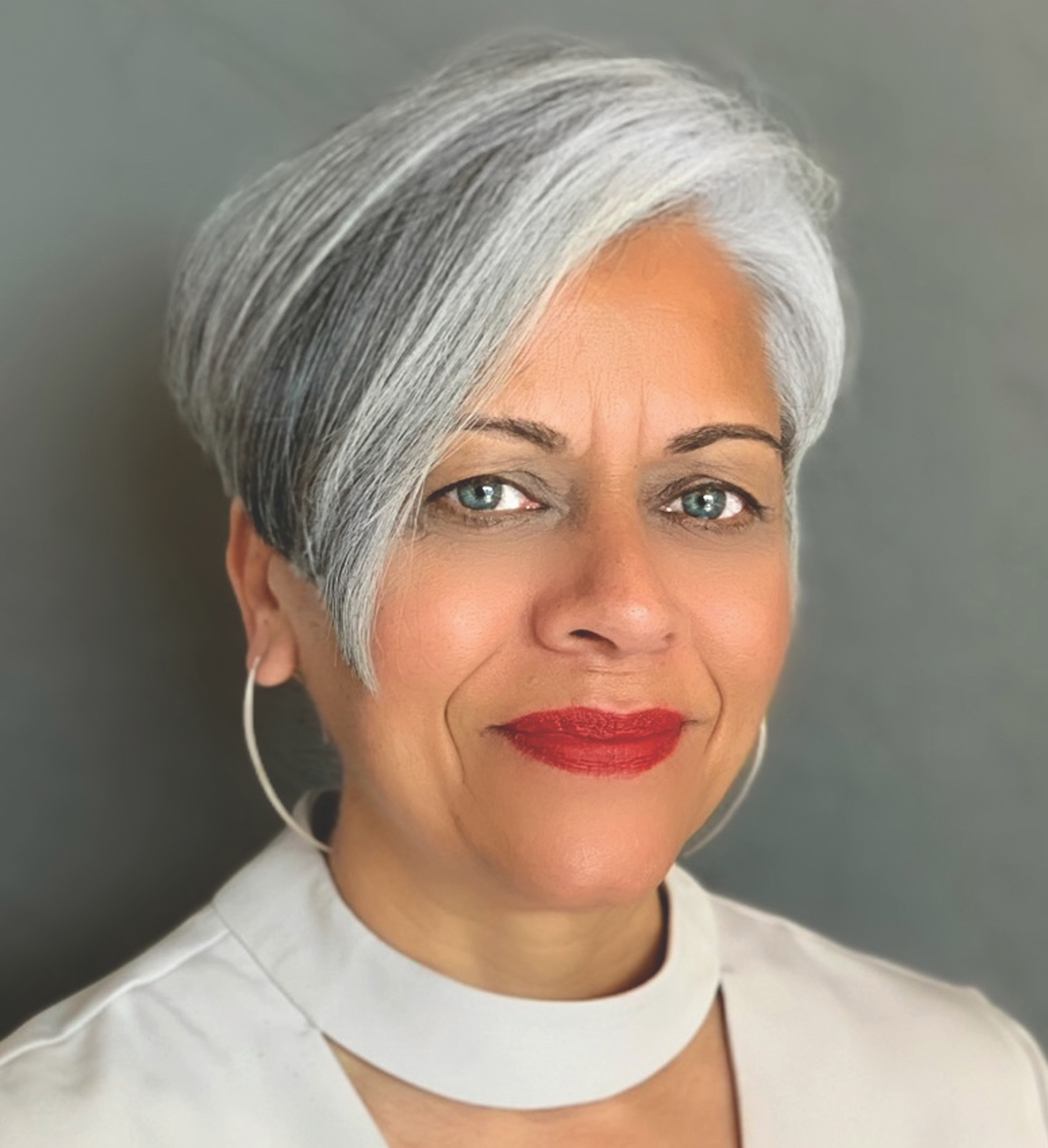
- Born: Jodhpur, Rajasthan, India
- Education: Stanford University; California College of the Arts
- Occupation: Author
- Writing career
- Notable work: The Henna Artist
- Website: alkajoshi.com

Alka Joshi is an Indian-American author known for her novel The Henna Artist.

== Early life and education ==
Alka Joshi was born in Jodhpur, India. She and her family moved to the United Statesin 1967, when Joshi was nine.

She received her Bachelor of Arts from Stanford University and her Master of Fine Arts from California College of the Arts.

== Career ==
Joshi began writing her debut novel, The Henna Artist, in 2010 and it was published in 2020. The Henna Artist was the May 2020 pick for Reese's Book Club. It is being made into a TV adaptation by Netflix, starring Freida Pinto.

In 2021, Joshi published her second novel, The Secret Keeper of Jaipur, the sequel to The Henna Artist. The final book in the Jaipur Trilogy, The Perfumist of Paris, came out in 2023.

In 2025, Joshi released Six Days in Bombay, a historical mystery loosely based on the life of Amrita Sher-Gil.

== Novels ==
- The Henna Artist (2020)
- The Secret Keeper of Jaipur (2021)
- The Perfumist of Paris (2023)
- Six Days in Bombay (2025)
