= Alexis Coe =

American political historian

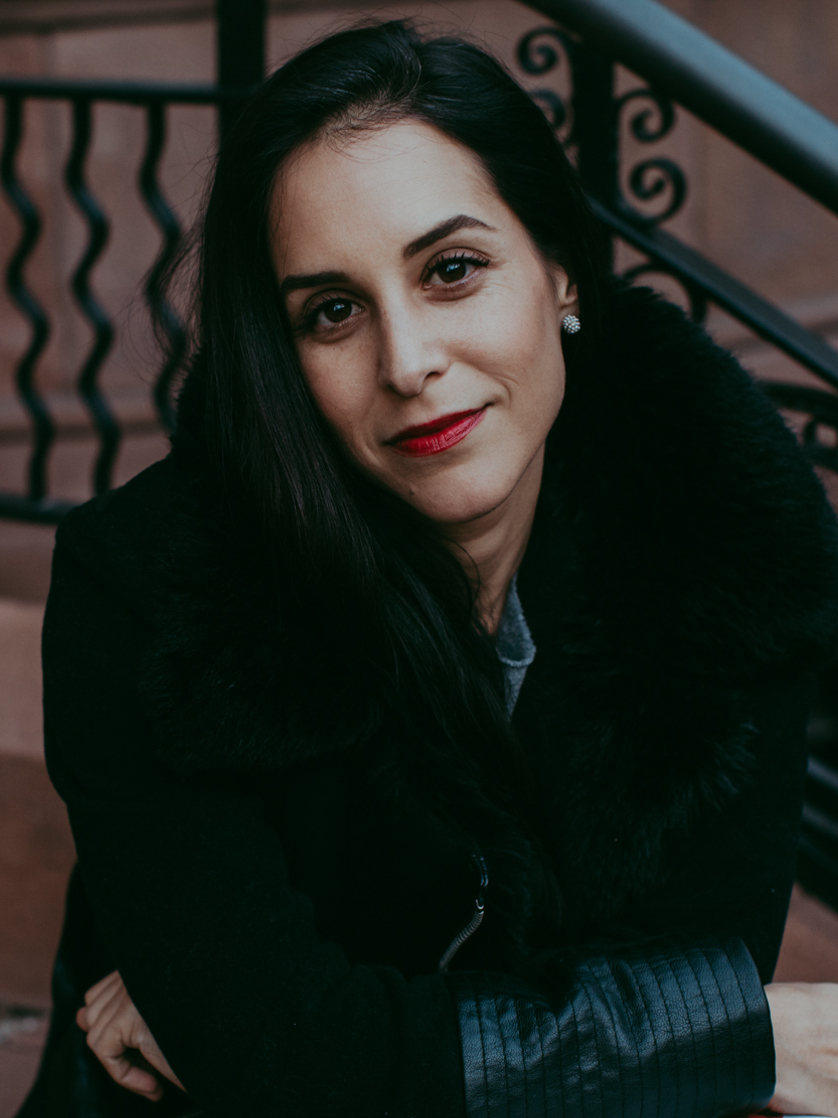
- Occupation: Historian
- Writing career
- Years active: 2014–present
- Notable work: You Never Forget Your First: A Biography of George Washington

Alexis Coe is an American presidential historian, columnist, podcast host, exhibition curator and TV commenter. She is a senior fellow at New America, the American history columnist at the New York Times Book Review, and the author of award-winning Alice and Freda Forever: A Murder in Memphis (2014) and the New York Times best-selling You Never Forget Your First: A Biography of George Washington (2020).

== Career ==
Coe was an oral historian for the Brooklyn Historical Society while in graduate school. She was a research curator in the New York Public Library’s exhibitions department where she co-curated "Find the Past, Know the Future," the most popular exhibition in the Library's history.

Coe has been published in The New York Times,The Atlantic, Slate, The New Yorker, and The New York Times Magazine.

Coe published Alice and Freda Forever: A Murder in Memphis in 2014. In 2016, Coe co-hosted the podcast Presidents Are People Too!. In 2018, she hosted the podcast, No Man's Land, which was produced by the women's coworking space company The Wing. It won a Webby award for Best Series. Episodes have focused on Stephanie St. Clair, a leader of a Harlem-based criminal syndicate; Ana Mendieta, a Cuban-American artist; and Ida B. Wells, a journalist and early leader in the Civil Rights Movement.

In 2020, Coe published You Never Forget Your First: A Biography of George Washington, making her the first woman with a published biography of Washington in 40 years. The book became a New York Times best-seller in February 2020 and was widely praised as genre-breaking.

Coe produced and starred in The History Channel's Washington series with Doris Kearns Goodwin.

In 2023, she spoke on CBS News about the historical significance of the March 2023 Indictment of Donald Trump. In 2025 Coe testified at the second hearing of the House Oversight Committee's "Task Force on the Declassification of Federal Secrets".

== Personal life ==
Coe was raised in Los Angeles, California. She moved to New York to go to Columbia and Sarah Lawrence. She has written about her grandparents, who helped raise her. She cared for her grandmother at the end of her life. Coe shared a birthday with her maternal grandfather, who is her daughter's namesake. She has an older brother.

Coe lives in New York with her young daughter.

== Bibliography ==
- Coe, Alexis (2014). Alice and Freda Forever: A Murder in Memphis. Pulp/Zest. ISBN 9781936976607. OCLC 1051071944.
- Coe, Alexis (2021). You Never Forget Your First: A Biography of George Washington. Penguin Random House. ISBN 9780735224117. OCLC 1247158274.
