= Aiden Thomas =

American author (born c. 1989)

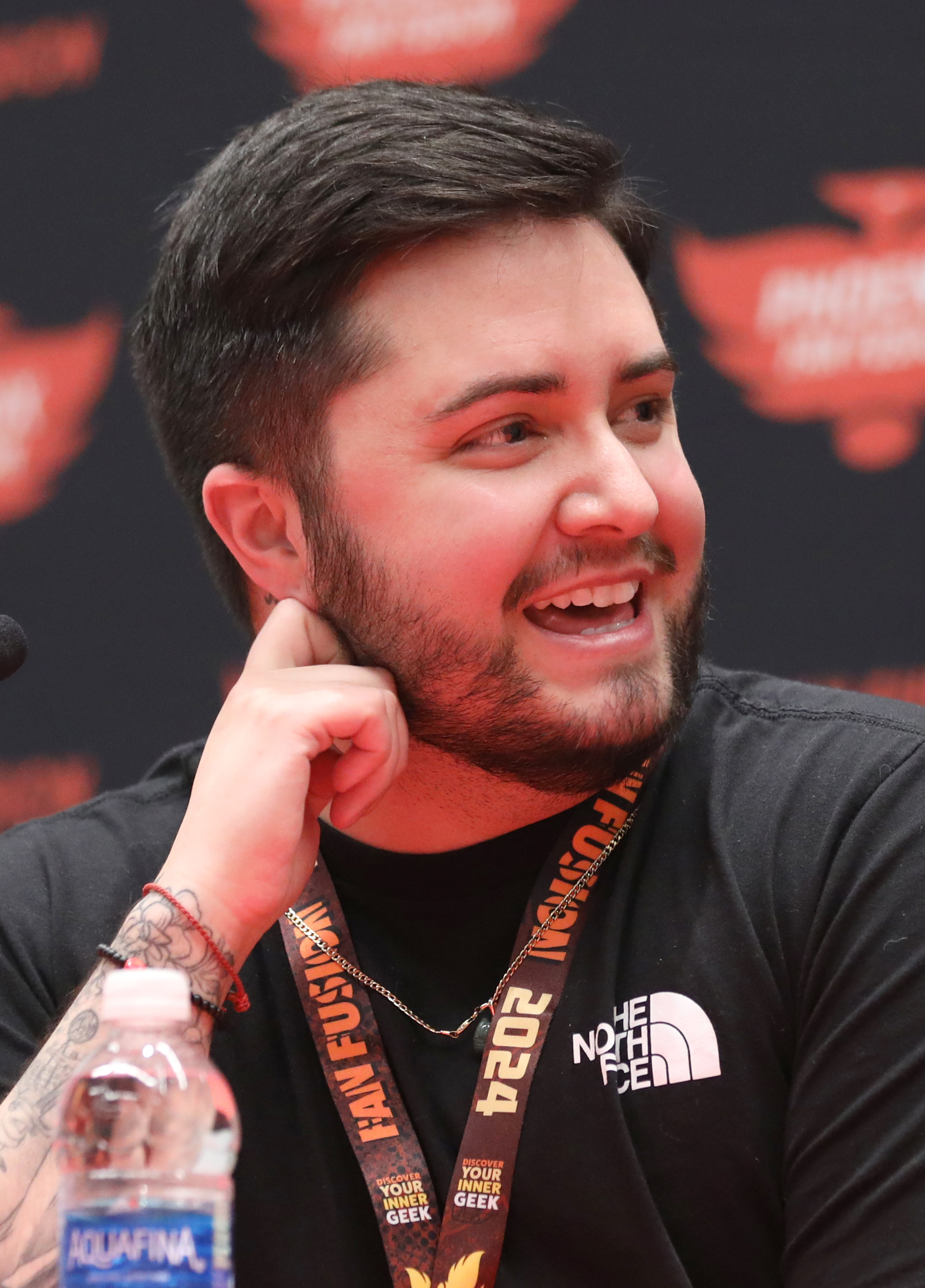
- Thomas in 2024
- Citizenship: United States of America
- Education: Mills College
- Writing career
- Genre: Young adult fiction
- Notable work: Cemetery Boys
- Website: www.aiden-thomas.com

Aiden Thomas (born July 14, c.1989) is an American author of young adult novels. He (Note: Thomas uses he/they pronouns. This articles uses he/him pronouns for consistency.) is best known for the novel Cemetery Boys which was a New York Times bestseller and won numerous awards, including best of the year recognition from the American Library Association, Publishers Weekly, Barnes & Noble, NPR and School Library Journal.

== Early life and education ==
Thomas was born in Oakland, California, and received a BA in English and a MFA in creative writing from Mills College.

== Personal life ==
He is of Cuban and Mexican heritage.

From 2007 to 2010, he attended Mills College, majoring in English and Psychology. While there, he rowed crew. The practices were at 5am, and he was always sleepy, so the coxswain called him "aidenschmaiden", which he later used for his Twitter username.

In 2011, he trained as a EMT and nearly completed a year before suffering from an accident.

In 2012–2013, he completed a post baccalaureate at Portland State University, studying English.

In 2013–2015, he completed an MFA in Creative Writing at Mills College, where he had 5 stories published and his thesis became the basis of a later book, Lost in the Never Woods.

Thomas lives in Portland. He is transgender and uses he/they pronouns.

== Books ==
=== Cemetery Boys ===
Cemetery Boys was published on September 1, 2020, by Swoon Reads. It tells the story of Yadriel, who is queer, transgender, Latino and a brujo. Unfortunately, his family does not recognize him as a man, which has serious effects on his abilities. The book was named a best seller by The New York Times and IndieBound, the first trans-centered book to do so, and received starred reviews from Publishers Weekly and Booklist.

The sequel, Cemetery Boys: Espíritu, was published on September 8, 2026.

=== Lost in the Never Woods ===
Lost in the Never Woods was published on March 23, 2021, by Swoon Reads. It is a retelling of Peter Pan. The book, as well as the audiobook, received a starred review from Booklist.

=== The Sunbearer Trials duology ===
The Sunbearer Trials, a Mexican-inspired fantasy was published on September 6, 2022, by Feiwel & Friends. It received starred reviews from Booklist and Publishers Weekly. The finale in this series, Celestial Monsters, was published on September 3, 2024, by Feiwel & Friends. It received starred reviews from Booklist and Kirkus Reviews.

=== Just Max ===
In October 2021, Thomas announced the acquisition of Just Max, a contemporary YA novel about a trans boy going to college and navigating all the new experiences that includes. Release was set for winter 2024, but as of November 2026, the book has not yet been published and no new release date has been announced.

== Awards and honors ==
Cemetery Boys is a Junior Library Guild book. It was a New York Times and Indiebound bestseller, and Publishers Weekly, NPR, and Barnes & Noble named it one of the best books of 2020. School Library Journal included the audiobook on their list of the top ten audiobooks of 2020, the American Library Association (ALA) included it on their 2020 list of the top ten Amazing Audiobooks for Young Adults. The following year, the ALA included it in the top ten on their Best Fiction for Young Adults list, ALA Rainbow Book List, and Teens' Top Ten list.

In 2023, the ALA included The Sunbearer Trials on their list of the Best Fiction for Young Adults and their Rainbow List.

Awards for Thomas's writing
Year	Title	Award	Result	Ref.
2020	Cemetery Boys	Bram Stoker Award for Best Young Adult Novel	Shortlisted	
2020	Cemetery Boys	Goodreads Choice Award for Young Adult Fantasy & Science Fiction	Nominee	
2020	Cemetery Boys	Goodreads Choice Award for Debut Novel	Nominee	
2020	Cemetery Boys	National Book Award for Young People's Literature	Longlisted	
2021	Cemetery Boys	Locus Award for Best First Novel	Nominee	
2021	Cemetery Boys	Lodestar Award	Finalist	
2021	Lost in the Never Woods	Goodreads Choice Award for Young Adult Fantasy & Science Fiction	Nominee	
