= You Never Forget Your First =

2020 biography of George Washington by Alexis Coe

- Author: Alexis Coe
- Language: English
- Subject: George Washington
- Genre: Biography
- Publisher: Viking Press
- Publication date: February 4, 2020
- Media type: Print
- ISBN: 9780735224100

You Never Forget Your First: A Biography of George Washington is a biography about George Washington, the first president of the United States. The book was written by Alexis Coe, a historian and former research curator at the New York Public Library, and is the third complete biography of Washington written by a female author. It was published on February 4, 2020, and appeared on The New York Times Best Sellers list.

== Reception ==
You Never Forget Your First reached #11 on The New York Times Hardcover Nonfiction Best Sellers list in February 2020.

David Shribman of The Boston Globe called the book "form-shattering and myth-crushing book", writing: "Coe examines myths with mirth, and writes history with humor. [...] While this surely should not be the only biography of Washington students of our founding should read, it is an accessible look at a president who always finishes in the first ranks of our leaders." Tatiana Schlossberg, in her review of the audiobook version of You Never Forget Your First for The New York Times, wrote that Coe illustrates that "most of what we do know [about Washington] is either untrue [...] or less interesting than what the existing history books have overlooked." Schlossberg also noted: "She has cleverly disguised a historiographical intervention in the form of a sometimes cheeky presidential biography."
