= Abby Jimenez =

American romance novelist and baker

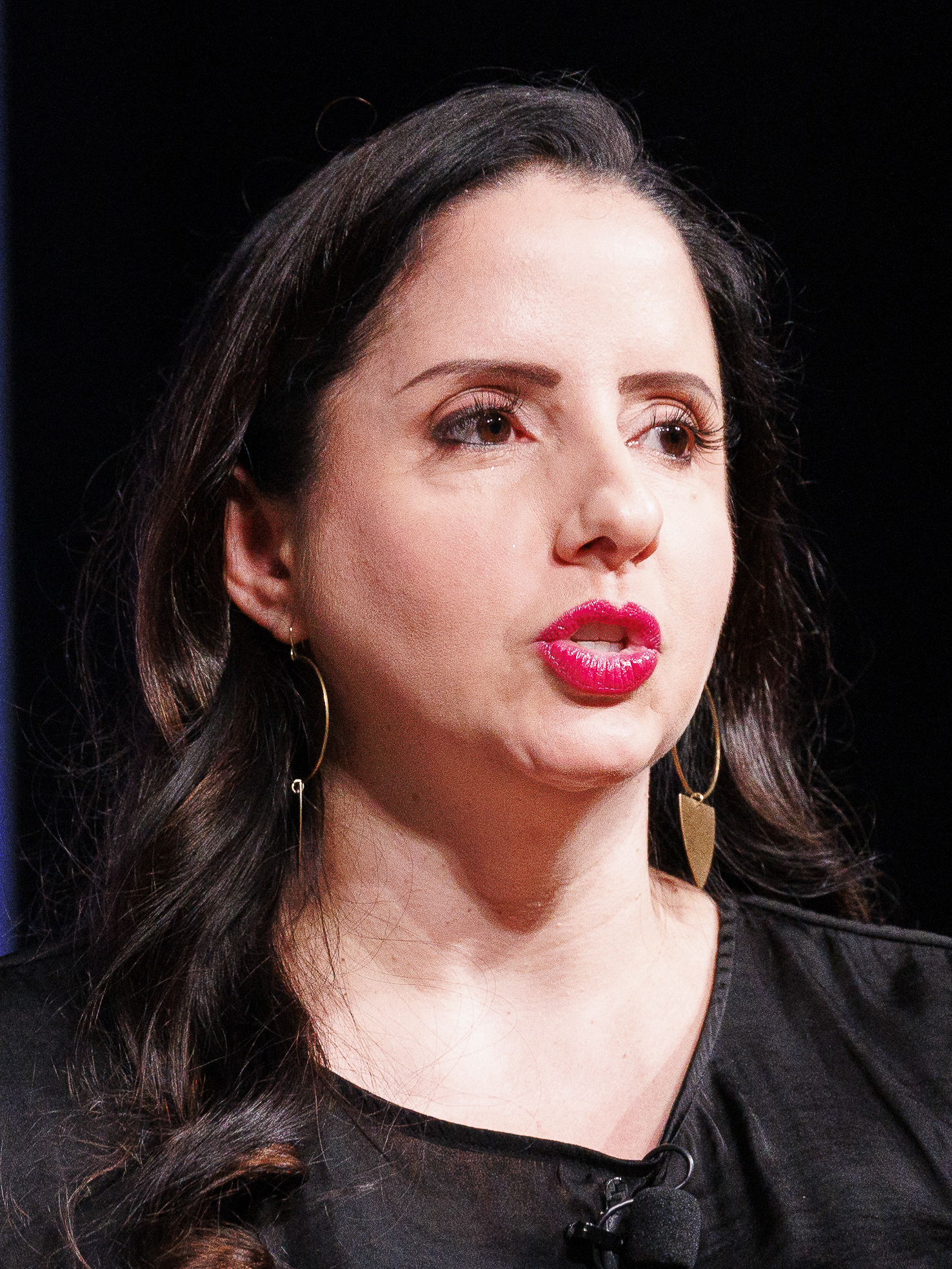
- Jimenez in 2024
- Born: Abigail Hales; 1979 or 1980 (age 46–47); Washington, D.C., U.S.
- Occupations: Novelist and baker
- Spouse: Carlos Jimenez
- Children: 3
- Writing career
- Years active: 2007–present
- Genre: Romance
- Notable works: The Friend Zone, Part of Your World; Say You'll Remember Me

Abigail Jimenez (née Hales; born 1979 or 1980) is an American romance novelist and baker. She is author of three series of romance novels: The Friend Zone (2019–2021), Part of Your World (2022–2024), and Say You'll Remember Me (2025–). She is the owner of a bake shop, Nadia Cakes, with locations in California and Minnesota, and she won the 2013 iteration of the Food Network competition show Cupcake Wars.

== Early life ==
Jimenez was born Abigail Hales in Washington, D.C. to a Sicilian mother and a father of Italian descent, and was the oldest of three daughters. She lived in Virginia until the age of seven, and then in California. At the age of twelve, her mother left, leaving her father as a single parent. Jimenez worked a number of retail and restaurant jobs to raise money for college and took her final year of high school as an independent study while working full time at Del Taco. She attended Quartz Hill High School, and said she "deeply disliked" high school, with the exception of her creative writing class, and that she was close to being expelled due to her involvement in fights.

== Baking career ==
Jimenez was a retail manager in 2007 when she lost her job and founded Nadia Cakes out of her home kitchen in the same year. In 2009, she opened her first brick and mortar location of Nadia Cakes in Palmdale, California. Jimenez won Food Network's Cupcake Wars in 2013 and appeared on TLC's Fabulous Cakes. Her family later moved to suburban Minneapolis, Minnesota, and she went on to open Nadia Cakes shops in Maple Grove and Woodbury, and in addition to the Palmdale location. In 2018, a pink rock candy cake sold by the bakery went viral on social media, owing to its resemblance to a vagina.

== Romance writing ==
During a camping trip to Boundary Waters, Jimenez told her children a story that she later developed into a young adult novel. Though she ultimately discarded the novel, she went on to write two series of romance novels. Her debut novel The Friend Zone was a bestseller in Poland and won an Empik award in 2020. The audiobook for the novel, narrated by Teddy Hamilton and Erin Mallon, was nominated for that year's Audie Award for Romance.

Her third and fourth novels Life's Too Short (2021) and Part of Your World (2022) both went on to become USA Today and New York Times Best Sellers. Her novels have been optioned by Thruline Entertainment, which has begun work on a film adaptation of The Happy Ever After Playlist. Life's Too Short won the 2022 Minnesota Book Award in the Genre Fiction category. Yours Truly was chosen as Book of the Year for 2023 by members of the Book of the Month club. Her 2024 novel Just for the Summer reached number 1 on the New York Times Best Seller list. It was also chosen for Good Morning America's book club for April 2024.

Jimenez published Say You'll Remember Me on April 1, 2025. The novel reached number 1 on the New York Times Best Seller list in the categories of "Combined Print and E-Book Fiction" and of "Hardcover Fiction". Jimenez has most recently announced her next book titled The Night We Met, that will follow the love story of the friends of Say You'll Remember Me protagonist, Xavier. A third romance novel will follow The Night We Met to round out the Say You'll Remember Me series.

According to the Minnesota Star Tribune, Jimenez's novels incorporate "very real and relatable" life experiences like anxiety, grief, and fertility alongside common tropes in romance comedies, and their settings in Minnesota have led her to become a "one-woman booster for state tourism". PBS Books noted in 2024 that her novels had sold over 1.5 million copies and had been translated into 28 different languages.

== Works ==
=== The Friend Zone series ===
- The Friend Zone (2019)
- The Happy Ever After Playlist (2020)
- Life's Too Short (2021)

=== Part of Your World series ===
- Part of Your World (2022)
- Yours Truly (2023)
- Just for the Summer (2024)

=== Say You'll Remember Me series ===
- Say You'll Remember Me (2025)
- The Night We Met (2026)
- Feels Like Falling (2027)

=== Other books ===
- A Married Little Christmas (2026)

== Personal life ==
Jimenez is of Sicilian descent. She is married to Carlos Jimenez, a first generation American of Salvadoran descent; the couple met at an airport in 2001. They were both managers working for Express and lived together in Palmdale, California. They have three daughters.

Jimenez announced in 2023 that she had been undergoing treatment for ovarian cancer. In the early 2020s, Jimenez found out she had chronic kidney disease caused by Sjögren's disease.
