= Erin Entrada Kelly =

American writer

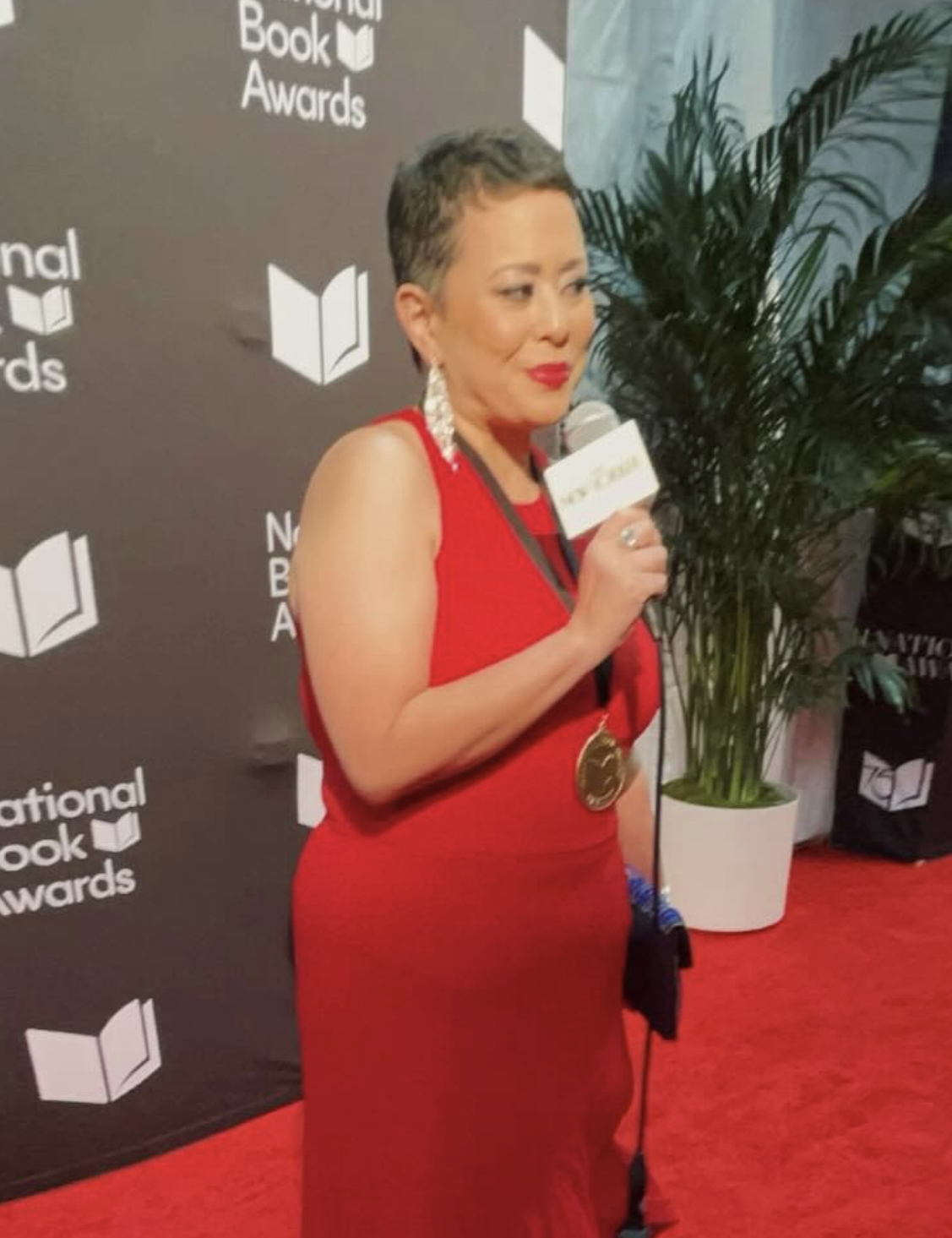
- Kelly at the 2024 National Book Awards in New York City
- Born: September 5, 1977 (age 48); Hays, Kansas, U.S.
- Education: McNeese State University (BA); Rosemont College (MFA); Moore College of Art and Design (Honorary Doctorate)
- Occupation: Writer
- Agent: Sara Crowe Literary
- Notable work: Blackbird Fly (2015), Hello Universe (2018), We Dream of Space (2020), The First State of Being (2024), At Last She Stood (2025), The Second Life of Snap (2026)
- Awards: Newbery Medal (2018, 2025); Newbery Honor (2021); National Book Award Finalist (2024); Sibert Honor (2025); Boston Globe-Horn Book Honor (2026)
- Website: erinentradakelly.com

Erin Entrada Kelly is an American writer. She received the 2018 John Newbery Medal by the Association for Library Service to Children for her third novel Hello, Universe. She won the award a second time in 2025 for her novel The First State of Being. She also received a 2021 Newbery Honor for We Dream of Space, the Award for Children's Literature from the Asian Pacific Librarians Association for her second novel The Land of Forgotten Girls, and a Sibert Honor for At Last She Stood: How Joey Guerrero Spied, Survived, and Fought for Freedom, her first work of nonfiction. She is one of only five authors who have won two Newbery Medals and a Newbery Honor. Kelly also received the prestigious Deutscher Jugendliter Preis (German Youth Literature Prize) for Vier Wünsche ans Universum, the German edition of Hello, Universe.

In 2026, Kelly received a Boston Globe-Horn Book Honor for The Second Life of Snap, which was described as "dystopian fiction at its finest" by the School Library Journal.

== Early life and education ==
Kelly was born in the United States and raised in Lake Charles, Louisiana, but now lives in New Castle County, Delaware, near Philadelphia, Pennsylvania. Her mother immigrated to the U.S. from the Philippines.

Kelly has a bachelor's degree from McNeese State University, a Master of Fine Arts from Rosemont College, and an honorary doctorate from Moore College of Art and Design in Philadelphia. She also served on the faculty of the Writing for Children and Young Adults program at Hamline University and was on the founding faculty for the University of San Francisco's Writing for Young Readers MFA Program.

== Career ==
Kelly started her career as a journalist for the American Press and worked as an editor for Thrive Magazine for several years before relocating to the Northeast.

Her debut novel, Blackbird Fly, was published by HarperCollins Greenwillow Books in 2015 and won a Golden Kite Award honor from the Society of Children's Book Writers and Illustrators and an honor award from APALA. She won the 2016 Children's Asian/Pacific American Awards for Literature for her second novel, The Land of Forgotten Girls. Kelly has also published numerous short stories for adults and worked as a book publicist with Smith Publicity in Cherry Hill, NJ.

Kelly's third novel, Hello, Universe, received the 2018 Newbery Medal, among other honors. Her 2024 book The First State of Being won the Newbery Medal and was a finalist for the National Book Award for Young People's Literature. She is also the author and illustrator of the Maybe Maybe Marisol Rainey series.

Kelly has cited Judy Blume as her greatest influence.

== Awards and recognition ==
- APALA Honor Award, Blackbird Fly
- Cybils Honor Award, Blackbird Fly
- Golden Kite Honor Award, Society for Children's Book Writers and Illustrators, Blackbird Fly
- Pat Conroy Southern Book Prize finalist, The Land of Forgotten Girls
- Dorothy Canfield Fisher Book Award finalist, The Land of Forgotten Girls
- Deutscher Jugendliteratur Preis, Hello, Universe
- Newbery Medal, Hello Universe
- Texas Bluebonnet Award Master List, Hello, Universe
- South Carolina Book Award Nominee, You Go First
- Bluestem Book Award Nominee, You Go First
- Mythopoeic Award Finalist for Best Fantasy Novel for Children, Lalani of the Distant Sea
- New York Public Library Best Books of the Year, Hello, Universe, Lalani of the Distant Sea, We Dream of Space
- Chicago Public Library Best Books of the Year, Hello, Universe, We Dream of Space
- Newbery Honor, We Dream of Space
- National Book Award for Young People's Literature finalist, The First State of Being
- Newbery Medal, The First State of Being
- Boston Globe-Horn Book Honor, The Second Life of Snap

== Selected works ==
- Blackbird Fly (2015) ISBN 9780062238610
- The Land of Forgotten Girls (2016) ISBN 9780062238641
- Hello, Universe (2017) ISBN 9780062414151
- You Go First (2018) ISBN 9780062414182
- Lalani of the Distant Sea (2019) ISBN 9780062747273
- We Dream of Space (2020) ISBN 9780062747303
- Maybe Maybe Marisol Rainey (2021) ISBN 9780062970428
- Those Kids from Fawn Creek (2022) ISBN 9780062970350
- Surely Surely Marisol Rainey (2022) ISBN 9780062970459
- The First State of Being (2024) ISBN 9781420516661
- At Last She Stood: How Joey Guerrero Survived, Spied, and Fought for Freedom (2025) ISBN 9780063218901
- Fatal Glitch: Camp Zero
