= Kiley Reid =

American novelist (born 1987)

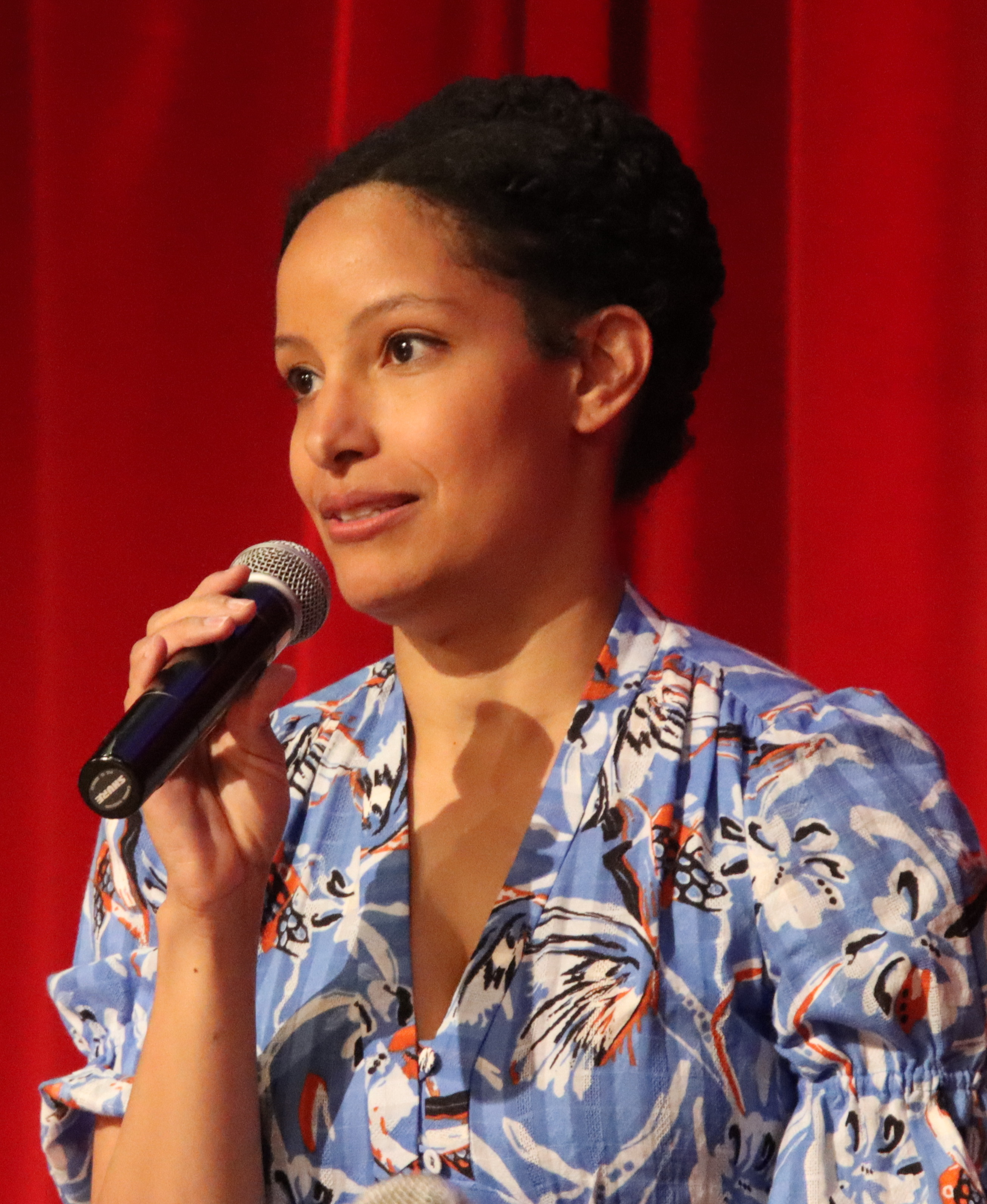
- Reid in 2023
- Born: 1987 (age 38–39); Los Angeles, California, U.S.
- Education: Salpointe Catholic High School
- Alma mater: Marymount Manhattan College; Iowa Writers' Workshop
- Occupations: Writer, novelist
- Writing career
- Notable work: Such a Fun Age (2019)
- Website: kileyreid.com

Kiley Reid (born 1987) is an American novelist. Her debut novel, Such a Fun Age, was published in December 2019 and was longlisted for the 2020 Booker Prize.

== Early life and education ==
Reid was born in Los Angeles, California, in 1987 and raised in Tucson, Arizona, from the age of seven to 20. She graduated from Salpointe Catholic High School and studied theater at the University of Arizona for two years before transferring to Marymount Manhattan College. Reid later graduated from the Iowa Writers' Workshop.

== Career ==
Reid's short stories have been featured in Ploughshares, December, New South, and Lumina.

=== Such a Fun Age ===
Reid's debut novel, Such a Fun Age, was published by G. P. Putnam's Sons on December 31, 2019. It was published by Bloomsbury Publishing in the United Kingdom on January 7, 2020. It was longlisted for the Booker Prize in July 2020 and won the International Book of the Year at the 2021 Australian Book Industry Awards.

The novel, which explores the relationship between a young black babysitter and her well-intentioned white employer, was ranked No. 3 on the New York Times hardcover fiction list within two weeks of its U.S. release. The novel received generally positive reviews from numerous media outlets, including The Washington Post, Entertainment Weekly, NPR, and The Atlantic. It was the first selection of 2020 for Reese Witherspoon's book club.

The Washington Post's review said that "Reid constructs a plot so beautifully intricate and real and fascinating that readers will forget it's also full of tough questions about race, class and identity." The Atlantic described the book as "a funny, fast-paced, empathetic examination of privilege in America." A review in The New York Times noted the book's "resonant insights into the casual racism in everyday life, especially in the America of the liberal elite," but described Reid's scenes and dialogue as feeling "deliberately styled for a screen adaptation," with "heavy-handed attempts to mimic millennial parlance."

Reid, who spent six years caring for the children of wealthy Manhattanites, began the novel while applying to graduate school. She completed it while earning her MFA degree from the Iowa Writers' Workshop, where she was awarded the Truman Capote Fellowship and taught undergraduate creative writing workshops with a focus on race and class. The book and screen rights to the story were acquired before she graduated.

=== Come and Get It ===
Reid's second novel, Come and Get It, was published on January 30, 2024, by Putnam. The plot follows a "residential assistant and her messy entanglement with a professor and three unruly students." According to the Los Angeles Times, "The true focus of her writing is money: who has it, who needs it and the precarious economy that links the two." The New York Times proclaimed, "Reid is a social observer of the highest order..." Vox's Constance Grady wrote, "This is a dark book where money shapes everything, even the most intimate of relationships. It is love and comfort and savior and corrupter all at once." Ron Charles of The Washington Post declared: "You're in the presence of a master plotter who's engineering a spectacular intersection of class, racism, academic politics and journalistic ethics."

== Personal life ==
As of 2019, Reid lived in Philadelphia with her husband. As of 2024, they live in Ann Arbor, where she teaches at the University of Michigan. In an interview with The Creative Independent, she stated that teaching and writing is "a lot of compartmentalizing". She and her husband have a daughter.

== Bibliography ==
=== Novels ===
- —— (2019). Such a Fun Age. New York: G. P. Putnam's Sons. ISBN 978-0-525-54190-5.
- —— (2024). Come and Get It. New York: G. P. Putnam's Sons. ISBN 978-0-593-32820-0.

=== Short stories ===
- —— (2019). George Washington's Teeth. Boston: Ploughshares. pp. 1–29. ISBN 9781626081598.
- —— (February 9, 2021). "Playing Kerri Strug". Marie Claire. Illustrations by Sofie Birkin.
- —— (February 25, 2021). "Simplexity". Currency. Amazon Original Stories. ASIN B08TWDXWHN. ISBN 978-1542009423.
