= Layla Saad =

British author

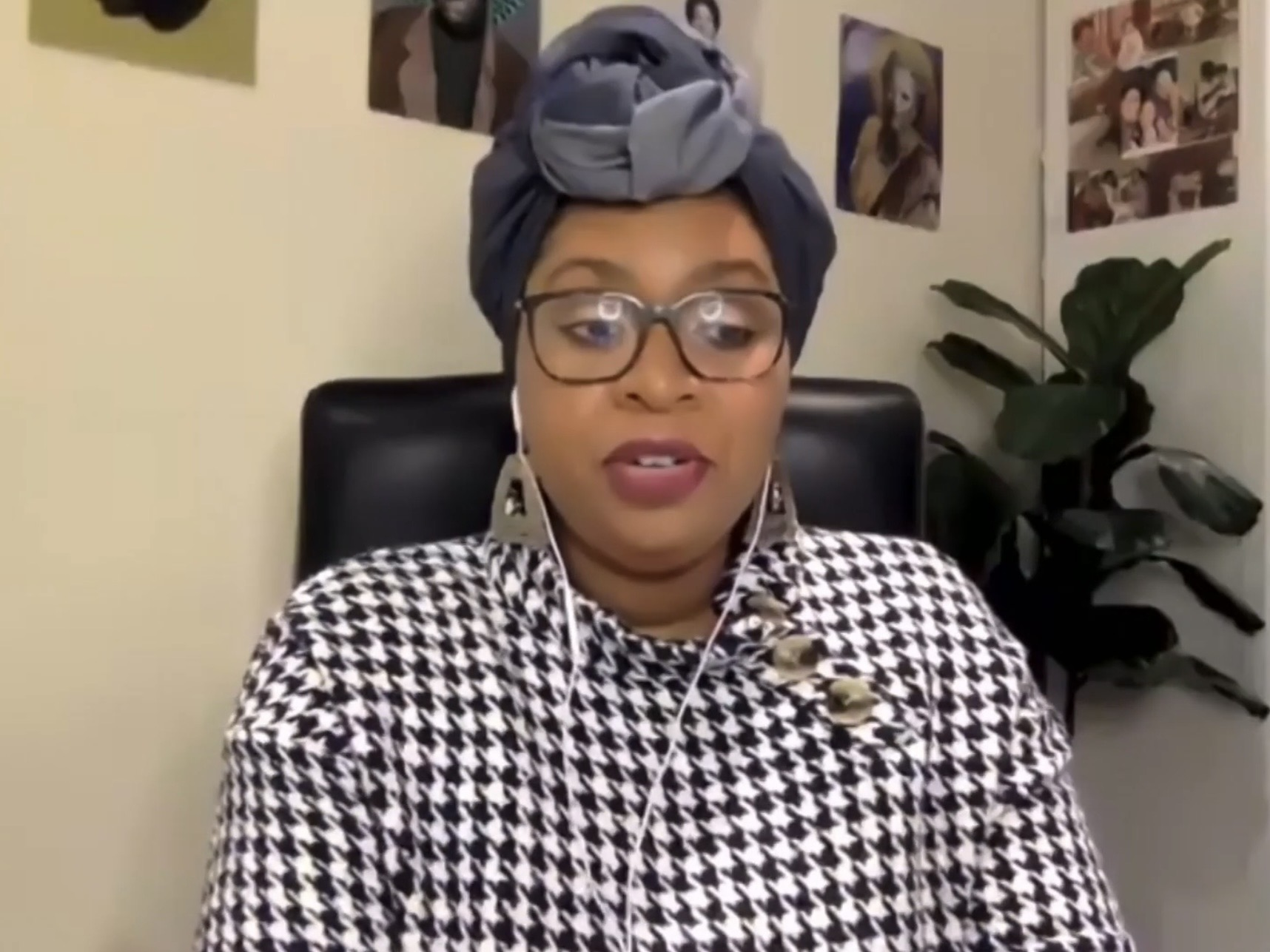
- Layla Saad in 2020
- Born: Wales
- Education: Lancaster University (LL.B.)
- Occupations: Writer; social media personality
- Writing career
- Subjects: Racism and white supremacy
- Notable work: Me and White Supremacy

Layla Saad is a British social-media figure and author. After starting an Instagram trend #MeAndWhiteSupremacy, she developed her work into the digital Me and White Supremacy Workbook. It was published in 2020 as the book Me and White Supremacy, which entered The New York Times Best Seller list.

== Early life ==
Saad's mother was from Zanzibar, Tanzania, while her father was from Mombasa, Kenya. They both moved to Wales, where they met and where Saad was born and raised. She also lived in Tanzania and Swindon, United Kingdom, while growing up. As a child, she was a fan of detective fiction. The family moved to Qatar when Saad was aged 15. Returning to the United Kingdom for university, Saad received a Bachelor of Law degree from Lancaster University.

== Career ==
In 2017, Saad wrote a blog post "I Need to Talk to Spiritual White Women About White Supremacy". Well received by some, it also received a backlash from some white people. In 2018, Saad started an Instagram challenge under the hashtag #MeAndWhiteSupremacy, which encouraged people to consider their relation to white supremacy for 28 days. It was popular among teachers. Following this, she wrote the digital Me and White Supremacy Workbook, which was downloaded by 100,000 people over the course of six months, with public figures including Anne Hathaway, Elizabeth Gilbert, Robin DiAngelo and Glennon Doyle endorsing the book.

In 2020, this work was developed into her first book, Me and White Supremacy. The book reached number 10 on The New York Times Best Seller list on 16 February 2020, in the category Combined Print & E-Book Nonfiction. A young readers' edition of Me and White Supremacy was published in February 2022. The book received renewed attention following the May 2020 murder of George Floyd and subsequent protests, with a surge in sales of books about race. The book reached number five on the New York Times' Hardcover Nonfiction list on 12 July 2020. It was third on the Sunday Times Bestsellers list on 26 June 2020. On the audiobook sales website Audible, the book was sixth in non-fiction sales for the week ending 5 June 2020.

In 2021, Me and White Supremacy was shortlisted for the Non-Fiction: Narrative Book of the Year award at the British Book Awards.

Saad hosts the Good Ancestor Podcast, interviewing people about "ancestors" in their family or in wider society who have influenced them.

== Personal life ==
Saad lives in Doha, Qatar. She is married and has two children, Maya and Mohamed. Saad is a Muslim.

== Works ==
- Saad, Layla (2020). Me and White Supremacy. Sourcebooks. ISBN 1529405084
