= Men's romantic fiction =

Portrayals of love from a male perspective

Men's romantic fiction refers to any fictional portrayal of romantic love either in film, text, or other media and is usually either told from the male protagonist's point of view or taking particular interest in the romance as viewed from a male perspective.

Although generally concerning heterosexual relationships, men's romantic fiction also includes gay romantic fiction, romance dealing with love between men.

The genre of lad lit also has somewhat similar connotations.

== Examples ==
For example, the novels Belinda by Anne Rice and Northern Lights by Nora Roberts are both told from the male protagonist's point of view. The novel Somewhere In Time (Former title: Bid Time Return) by Richard Matheson is a romance told from the male protagonist point of view. It is sometimes classified as science fiction as well as romance. Other novelists such as Nicholas Sparks who wrote A Walk to Remember and The Notebook usually write from the male perspective, foregrounded by typical prefaces and diary entries at the beginning of the story.

Romantic stories told from the point of view of a male protagonist are very common among Japanese shounen and seinen manga and bishoujo games. Many of the latter contain erotic aspects in addition to the portrayal of romantic love.
