= Emma Lord =

American author

Emma Lord is an American author of romance novels in the young adult fiction genre. Her novels are Tweet Cute, You Have a Match, When You Get the Chance, and Begin Again. Her debut novel, Tweet Cute, is a YA retelling of You've Got Mail and was listed on Cosmopolitan's list of the 100 Best YA Novels of All Time. Her sophomore novel You Have a Match was the Winter 2021 YA Pick for Reese's Book Club and a New York Times bestseller. Her third novel, When You Get the Chance, was inspired by Mamma Mia! and tells the story of an aspiring theatre actress on the search her mother after finding her father's old LiveJournal account.

== Bibliography ==
- Tweet Cute (2020)
- You Have a Match (2021)
- When You Get the Chance (2022)
- Begin Again (2023)
- The Getaway List (2024)
- The Break-Up Pact (2024)
- The Rival (2025)
- For The Record (2025)
