= Hello, Universe =

2017 novel written by Erin Entrada Kelly

- Author: Erin Entrada Kelly
- Audio read by: Ramon de Ocampo, Amielynn Abellera
- Illustrator: Isabel Roxas
- Publisher: Greenwillow Books, Harper Collins
- Publication date: 14 March 2017
- Pages: 320
- Awards: Newbery Medal
- ISBN: 9780062414151
- OCLC: 1027574624
- Website: https://www.harpercollins.com/9780062414151/hello-universe

Hello, Universe is a 2017 novel written by Erin Entrada Kelly. The novel is told from the perspectives of four middle school students as one of them becomes trapped in a well. Hello, Universe received the 2018 Newbery Medal.

== The book ==
The novel is told from four points of view: Virgil Salinas, a Filipino-American boy; Kaori Tanaka, a Japanese-American girl; Valencia Somerset, a girl in Virgil's class who is deaf; and Chet Bullens, the neighborhood bully. The narrative mostly takes place over the course of a single summer day. In an interview, Kelly said it was important to celebrate her Filipino culture: "Filipino culture isn't something that's necessarily prevalent in western literature, especially for kids." Kelly also cited Filipino folklore as an inspiration for the book.

== Reception ==
The book received a largely positive reception, including several starred reviews. Reviewers noted its well-written and diverse characters and relatable plot. A Kirkus starred review wrote of the "supremely well-crafted perspectives" of the four narrators. In a more mixed review, Sarah Hannah Gomez writing for the Horn Book Magazine stated, "while the ending may be a bit too tidy, the children’s inner lives are distinctive, and each rings true." The diversity presented by the characters and the low-key way this was handled was also praised in several reviews, including by Angie Bayne writing for the Jefferson City News Tribune, "diversity is not treated as a plot point but just a point of fact."

Several reviews commented on the appeal of the book to children. Michelle Shaw writing for School Library Journal, praised its wide appeal, "Readers across the board will flock to this book that has something for nearly everyone" while a starred Booklist review stated, "readers will be instantly engrossed."

Hello, Universe was announced as the 2018 Newbery Medal winner in February 2018. The selection committee noted that the book was "masterfully told through shifting points of view," adding that "this modern quest tale shimmers with humor and authentic emotion." Kelly called winning the Newbery among her proudest moments.

The German edition of Hello, Universe was awarded the 2019 Deutscher Jugendliteraturpreis, the country's highest honor for children's literature.

== Adaptation ==
On 22 May 2019, it was announced that Netflix will adapt this novel into a feature film.

Awards
Preceded by The Girl Who Drank the Moon	Newbery Medal recipient 2018	Succeeded by Merci Suárez Changes Gears
