= Kristin Harmel =

American novelist (born 1979)

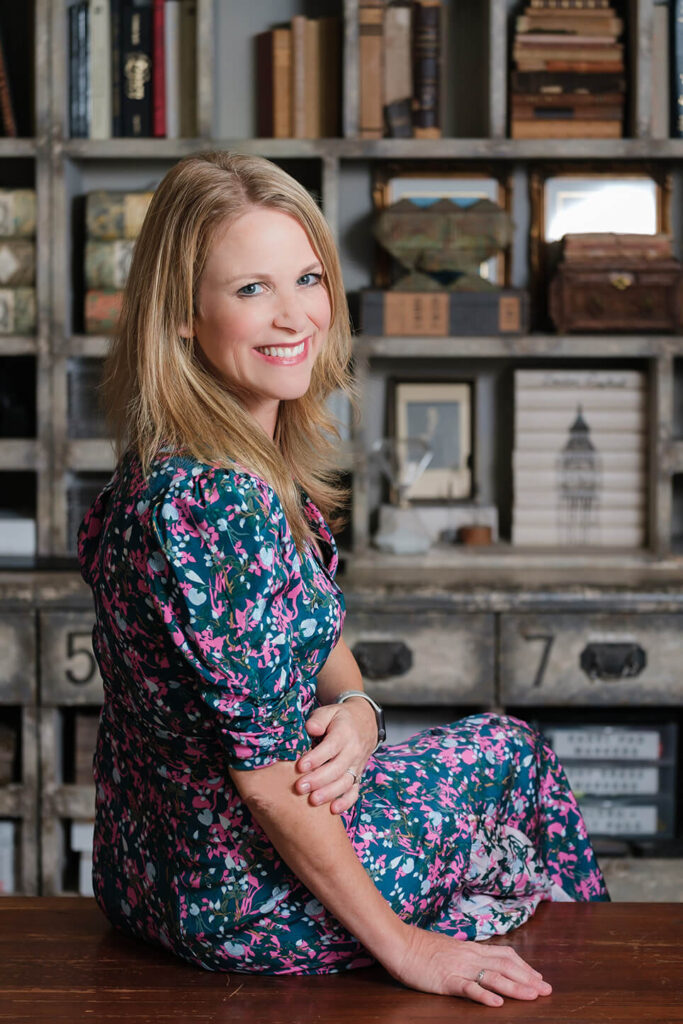
- Born: Newton, Massachusetts, U.S.
- Education: University of Florida
- Occupations: Reporter; Novelist
- Website: kristinharmel.com

Kristin Harmel is an American novelist. Her most notable works include The Book of Lost Names, The Forest of Vanishing Stars, The Sweetness of Forgetting, and The Paris Daughter.

== Biography ==
Born in Newton, Massachusetts, Harmel gained her first writing experience at the age of 16 as a sports reporter for the St. Petersburg Times, and Tampa Bay AllSports magazine while still attending Northeast High School in St. Petersburg, Florida.

A graduate of the University of Florida, Harmel was a reporter for People magazine from 2000 to 2012, and a regular contributor to the nationally syndicated television morning show "The Daily Buzz. Her work has appeared in dozens of other publications, including Men's Health, Glamour, YM, Teen People, People en Español, Runner's World, American Baby, Every Day With Rachael Ray, and more.

Her books have been translated into more than thirty languages and have been New York Times bestsellers, USA Today bestsellers and international bestsellers. Her The Book of Lost Names was a finalist for the National Jewish Book Award and for a Goodreads Choice Award in 2020.

Harmel is the co-founder and co-host of the web show Friends & Fiction.

Harmel has lived in Paris and Los Angeles and now resides in Orlando, Florida.

== Books ==
- 2006: How to Sleep with a Movie Star
- 2007: The Blonde Theory
- 2007: The Art of French Kissing
- 2008: When You Wish
- 2009: Italian for Beginners
- 2010: After
- 2012: The Sweetness of Forgetting
- 2014: The Life Intended
- 2016: How to Save a Life: A Novella
- 2016: When We Meet Again
- 2018: The Room on Rue Amelie
- 2019: The Winemaker's Wife
- 2020: The Book of Lost Names
- 2021: The Forest of Vanishing Stars
- 2022: The Paris Daughter
- 2025: The Stolen Life of Colette Marceau
