= The House in the Cerulean Sea =

2020 fantasy novel by TJ Klune

- First edition
- Author: TJ Klune
- Language: English
- Genre: Fantasy
- Publisher: Tor Books
- Publication date: March 17, 2020
- Publication place: United States
- Pages: 352
- ISBN: 978-1-250-21728-8

The House in the Cerulean Sea is a fantasy novel written by TJ Klune and published by Tor Publications on March 17, 2020.

== Background ==
The book was written by TJ Klune and published by Tor Books on March 17, 2020. The book was written during the first presidency of Donald Trump and Klune noted that the administration's immigration policy was separating families which was an influence on the book. The book was published during the COVID-19 pandemic when many people were confined to their homes. There was an increased interest in cozy fantasy stories like The House in the Cerulean Sea during the pandemic.

The story is set in a fantasy world with themes focused on parenting, childhood, and family. In the book, strict rules and management are depicted as grey while nature and childhood are depicted as colorful. The LGBT themes in Klune's works have led to some of his other books being banned in schools such as The Extraordinaries. While The House in the Cerulean Sea has not been banned, it has been targetted by the religious organization called Recover America.

== Plot ==
Linus Baker works for the Department in Charge of Magical Youth, known as DICOMY, a government agency responsible for monitoring orphanages that house magical children. His life is quiet, lonely, and highly regulated. As a case worker, he travels to different homes, evaluates whether they meet DICOMY’s standards, and submits careful reports. His routine changes when he is summoned by Extremely Upper Management, or EUM, and given a confidential month-long assignment. His direct superior for the mission is Mr. Charles Werner, one of EUM’s four members.

The assignment sends Linus to the remote island of Marsyas, where he must evaluate an unusual orphanage run by Arthur Parnassus. Six magical children live there, each of them considered extraordinary even by magical standards. One is Lucy, short for Lucifer, who is the Antichrist.

The other children are just as unusual. Theodore is a wyvern, one of very few still known to exist. Talia is a female gnome, which is itself rare. Phee is a forest sprite with remarkable power. Chauncey is a tentacled, amorphous blob who is often treated as monstrous because of his appearance. Sal is a shapeshifter who turns into a small Pomeranian and can pass shapeshifting abilities to others through his bite. Sal has suffered deeply, having been abused and moved through many orphanages before arriving on Marsyas.

Arthur is much more than an administrator to the children; they regard him as a father. Zoe Chapelwhite, an undocumented adult island sprite who has lived on Marsyas since before the orphanage was established, also helps care for them, though not in any official role. At first, Linus is uneasy around the children, especially because of what he has been told about them. Over time, however, he comes to understand that they are not threats simply because they are powerful or different. Arthur insists that the children should not be defined by other people’s fear of them, and Linus begins to see the truth of that. The children, meanwhile, are afraid of Linus because his report could determine whether they lose their home.

Linus has always tried to keep emotional distance from the children whose lives he evaluates. He has told himself that his role is only to observe, report, and follow procedure. On Marsyas, that distance becomes impossible to maintain. He grows attached to the children and increasingly drawn to Arthur, who returns his feelings. His reports to EUM begin to reflect this sympathy, which alarms the organization. In response, Mr. Charles Werner reveals that Arthur is not merely human but a phoenix, an exceptionally rare magical being. Werner gives Linus access to a burned-out cellar on the island, hoping the sight of it will make Linus view Arthur as dangerous.

Instead, the cellar reveals Arthur’s painful history. Arthur explains that he was raised in a DICOMY orphanage where he was mistreated. When he attempted to report the abuse, the orphanage master intercepted his plea for help and locked him in the cellar. Trapped and desperate, Arthur burned the cellar while trying to escape, but he remained imprisoned until DICOMY finally investigated months later. As an adult, Arthur asked to manage the Marsyas orphanage so he could create the kind of safe home he had never been given. DICOMY agreed, but only on the condition that he keep his identity as a phoenix secret.

The nearby village of Marsyas is largely hostile toward the children, fearing them because of rumors and prejudice. Linus encourages Arthur to bring the children into the village rather than hide them away. Helen, the mayor, supports them and challenges the villagers to see the children as individuals rather than dangers.

When Linus’s assignment ends, Arthur asks him to remain on the island, but Linus returns to his old life instead. Back at DICOMY, he recommends that the Marsyas orphanage be allowed to stay open. He also openly criticizes the organization’s discriminatory system, particularly its practice of isolating magical children from others.

After his recommendation is accepted, Linus realizes that Marsyas has become his true home. He resigns from DICOMY and goes back to Arthur and the children. Upon his return, he and Arthur reunite and finally kiss. Linus later files an anonymous whistleblower complaint exposing DICOMY’s discrimination, which leads to the entire EUM stepping down and being replaced. He also speaks with a reporter who intends to publish an exposé about the agency.

In the aftermath, Helen brings another child to the island: David, an undocumented yeti boy in need of a safe place to live. Arthur and Linus plan to formally adopt all the children, including David. The story ends with Arthur and Linus preparing for their wedding, surrounded by the family they have chosen and built together.

== Reception ==
The book received a starred review in Publishers Weekly calling the story "hopeful to its core". Kirkus Reviews called the writing "a touch wooden in places" but despite this believed that "fans of quirky fantasy will eat it up." Stephanie Klose wrote in the Library Journal that the book is a "charming, funny tale about chosen family and finding your place in the world". Writing in Booklist, Regina Schroeder called the book a "sweet narrative about the value of asking questions and the benefits of giving people ... a chance". Theresa Bourke praise the book in the Brainerd Dispatch saying that "the story tugged at my heartstrings". In the Springfield News-Leader, Morgan Shannon wrote that the book is "Enchanting, whimsical and thoughtfully tender". The book received 5 stars from Common Sense Media for ages twelve and up.

=== Awards ===
Award	Date	Category	Result	Ref.
RUSA awards	2021	Fantasy	Won	
Mythopoeic Awards	2021	Fantasy Awards - Adult Literature	Won	
Alex Awards	2021	N/A	Won	
PopSugar Book Club Awards	2020	Best Book Cover of 2020	Won	

== Adaptation ==
An animated TV series based on the book and developed by Warner Bros. Animation was announced on April 8, 2026.
