= Me and White Supremacy =

2020 book by Layla Saad

Me and White Supremacy: Combat Racism, Change the World, and Become a Good Ancestor
- Front cover (US)
- Author: Layla Saad
- Subject: White supremacy
- Genre: Non-fiction
- Publisher: Sourcebooks (US); Quercus Books (UK)
- Publication date: January 28, 2020
- Pages: 256 pp.
- ISBN: 9781728209807

Me and White Supremacy: Combat Racism, Change the World, and Become a Good Ancestor is a book by Layla Saad, published on January 28, 2020. Structured as a 28-day guide targeted at white readers, the book aims to aid readers in identifying the impact of white privilege and white supremacy over their lives. It contains quotations, terminology definitions, and question prompts. It received positive critical reception, entering many bestseller lists in June 2020 after a surge in popularity in the wake of the murder of George Floyd and subsequent protests.

== Background ==
In 2017, Saad wrote a blog post "I Need to Talk to Spiritual White Women About White Supremacy". In 2018, Saad started an Instagram challenge under the hashtag #MeAndWhiteSupremacy, which encouraged people to consider their relation to white supremacy for 28 days. Following this, she wrote the digital Me and White Supremacy Workbook, which was downloaded by 100,000 people over the course of six months. This was developed into the 2020 book Me and White Supremacy.

In May 2019, Quercus Books acquired the U.K. rights to the book, initially subtitled A 28-day Journey to Kickstart Your Life-Long Anti-Racism Work. As of 2019, a young readers' edition to the book was planned.

== Synopsis ==
The book opens with a foreword by American academic and author Robin DiAngelo. Structured as a 28-day guide divided into four weeks and targeted at white readers, the book aims to aid readers in identifying the impact of white privilege and white supremacy over their lives. It contains quotations, terminology definitions and writing prompts. The first week, "The Basics", discusses concepts such as white fragility and tone policing. The second, "Anti-Blackness, Racial Stereotypes and Cultural Appropriation", covers the titular subjects in addition to color blindness. The third, "Allyship", is about individual action and attitudes that white people can adopt. The last, "Power, Relationships and Commitments", continues this subject and poses questions about structural change.

== Reception ==
The book reached number 10 on The New York Times Best Seller list on February 16, 2020, in the category Combined Print & E-Book Nonfiction. The book received renewed attention following the May 2020 murder of George Floyd and subsequent protests, with a surge in sales of books about race. The book reached number six on the New York Times' Hardcover Nonfiction list on June 11, 2020. It was listed fifth in USA Today's Best-Selling Books List of June 10, and on the Hardcover Nonfiction list of Washington Post on June 9. On the audiobook sales website Audible, the book was sixth in non-fiction sales for the week ending June 5.

=== Critical reception ===
Enobong Tommelleo of Booklist gave the book a starred review, lauding it as "an insightful and necessary contribution to the work of combating racism". Another starred review by Michelle Anya Anjirbag of Shelf Awareness, praised it as providing "insightful and helpful advice". Emily Bowles of Library Journal recommended it as "required reading for people ready to acknowledge their behaviors". Bowles said it would "equip scholars, activists, and allies with real tools to promote systemic change". Kirkus Reviews described the book as a "bracing, highly useful tool for any discussion of combating racism". Carl Logan of Midwest Book Review called it "mandatory reading for anyone having to deal with the social injustice arising from racism and bigotry".

Melissa Phruksachart at the Boston Review positions the book alongside other contemporary 'white liberalism' literature, both praising and critiquing Saad's book. She writes: "Like any self-help guide practiced privately or in communion with others, from the Bible to The Power of Now, your mileage may vary."
