= The Hypnotist =

Hypnotist or The Hypnotist may refer to:

- Hypnotist, a person who practices hypnosis

== Film ==
- The Hypnotist, the working title of the 1927 American mystery horror film London After Midnight
- The Hypnotist (1940 film), a 1940 Mexican comedy mystery film
- The Hypnotist (1957 film), a British thriller film
- The Hypnotist, the American home video title of the 1999 Japanese horror film Saimin
- The Hypnotist (2012 film), a 2012 Swedish crime thriller film

== Literature ==
- The Hypnotist, a 1979 horror novel by Brad Steiger
- The Hypnotist, a 1996 psychological thriller novel by Seth Margolis
- The Hypnotist (novel), a 2009 crime novel by Lars Kepler
- The Hypnotist, a 2010 novel by M. J. Rose

== Music ==
- "The Hypnotist", a song by Erra from their 2016 album Drift

== Television ==
- "The Hypnotist", a 1953 episode of Topper
- "The Hypnotist", a 1955 episode of The Jackie Gleason Show
- "The Hypnotist", a 1956 episode of Judge Roy Bean
- "Hypnotist", a 1958 episode of This Is Alice
- "The Hypnotist", a 1960 episode of Leave It to Beaver
- "The Hypnotist", a 1961 episode of The Flintstones
- "The Hypnotist", a 1961 episode of The Jim Backus Show
- "The Hypnotist", a 1963 episode of The Bill Dana Show
- "The Hypnotist", a 1965 episode of The Magic Boomerang
- "The Hypnotist", a 1976 episode of Chico and the Man
- "The Hypnotist", a 1978 episode of Sykes
- "The Hypnotist", a 1983 episode of Henry's Cat
- "The Hypnotist", episode two of Freud, 1984
- "The Hypnotist", a 1997 episode of Johnson and Friends
- "The Hypnotist", a 1998 episode of Recess
- "The Hypnotist", a 2000 episode of Stark Raving Mad
- "The Hypnotist", episode eighty-six of Crime Time, 2009
- "Hypnotist", a 2013 episode of Deal with It
- "Hypnotist", a 2014 episode of T.I. & Tiny: The Family Hustle
- "The Hypnotist", a 2017 episode of Mansour

== See also ==
- Hypnotize (disambiguation)
- Hypnotized (disambiguation)
- Hypnosis (disambiguation)
