= Ulf Stenberg =

Swedish actor and theatre director (born 1979)

- Born: 1979 (age 46–47); Boden, Norrbotten, Sweden
- Occupations: Actor; director; playwright

Ulf Stenberg (born 1979) is a Swedish screen actor, director, and playwright. He is best known for his roles in Beartown (2020) and The Playlist (2022).

== Early life ==
Stenberg was born in 1979 in Boden. He grew up in Umeå.

== Career ==
=== Theatre company ===
In 2010, he founded Teater Fryshuset with his childhood friend Emil Rosén Adsten. Together they have directed numerous plays, including Klipp han (2017), Bye bye bror (2020), and Rov (2025). Stenberg is co-artistic director of the theatre, and also works as a director and playwright for their productions. In 2024, it was reported that the theatre may be forced to close after losing grant support from organizations including the Swedish Arts Council.

=== Acting ===
He appeared in The Reunion (2013) and had a supporting role in Peter Grönlund's debut film Drifters (2015).

He played Jonas, a fertility doctor, in Love Me (2020).

He played the lead role of ex-NHL star turned small town junior hockey coach Peter Andersson in Beartown (2020). Stenberg's performance was described as exuding a "confident but misguided masculinity" by Jacob Lundström in Dagens Nyheter, and was praised as a series standout by Jan Andersson in Göteborgs-Posten. For Beartown, Stenberg earned a nomination for Best Male Actor in a Leading Role at Kristallen 2021.

He was nominated for a Guldbagge Award for Best Supporting Actor for Fraemling, a 2019 documentary. In 2022, he played Per Sundin in a Netflix limited series about the origins of Spotify. The same year, he also appeared in Meaning of Life, a 2022 comedy-drama series, as Alex. He played Fredde in Tystnaden (2025), a standalone follow-up series to the 2023 series Gaslight.

== Filmography ==
=== Film ===
Year	Title	Role	Notes
2013	The Reunion		
2015	Drifters		
2019	Fraemling		

=== Television ===
Year	Title	Role	Notes
2015	Beck		
2016	Spring Tide		
2017	Before We Die		
2018	The Sandhamn Murders		
2018	Sthlm Requiem		
2020	Love Me	Jonas	5 Episodes
2020	Beartown	Peter Andersson	Lead Role
2021	The Hunters		
2022	The Playlist	Per Sundin	
2022	Meaning of Life	Alex	
2025	Tystnaden	Fredde	
