= Beartown (TV series) =

2020 Swedish drama television series

- English-language promotional poster
- Swedish: Björnstad
- Genre: Drama
- Based on: Beartown by Fredrik Backman
- Written by: Anders Weidemann; Antonia Pyk; Linn Gottfridsson
- Directed by: Peter Grönlund
- Starring: Ulf Stenberg; Miriam Ingrid; Oliver Dufåker; Aliette Opheim; Tobias Zilliacus
- Composer: Johan Testad
- Country of origin: Sweden
- Original language: Swedish
- No. of seasons: 1
- No. of episodes: 5

Production
- Producers: Bonnie Skoog Feeney; Mattias Arehn
- Cinematography: Petrus Sjövik
- Running time: 46–61 minutes
- Production company: Filmlance International

Original release
- Network: HBO Nordic
- Release: 18 October – 8 November 2020

Beartown (Swedish: Björnstad) is a five-episode 2020 drama series directed by Peter Grönlund. Based on Fredrik Backman's 2016 novel of the same name, the series centres on the fallout of a violent incident between two teenagers in a rural, declining town in Northern Sweden, where hockey is not just a sport but a way of life. The main roles are played by Ulf Stenberg, Miriam Ingrid, Oliver Dufåker, Aliette Opheim, and Tobias Zilliacus.

Filmlance International, best known for co-producing The Bridge (2011–2018), announced they had secured the rights to Backman's novel in 2017. Two years later, HBO Europe reported the series had been greenlit, making it their second Swedish production. Bonnie Skoog Feeney and Mattias Arehn produced the series through Filmlance. The story was adapted and written by screenwriters Anders Weidemann, Antonia Pyk, and Linn Gottfridsson. Hockey experience was a major consideration during casting, with casting director Maggie Widstrand contacting schools and hockey clubs throughout Northern Sweden. Filming primarily took place in Gällivare, Norrbotten County, from February to May 2019 over 72 days. Post-production was impacted by the COVID-19 pandemic.

The first two episodes of Beartown premiered on 18 October 2020 on HBO Nordic, with the remaining three being released weekly until 8 November. The series also had a North American release via Max on 22 February 2021. It received generally positive reviews from both Swedish and international critics. Praise was given to Grönlund's direction, the technical portrayal of the sport, and the performances of the cast. The series was nominated for Best TV Drama at Kristallen 2021. Stenberg and Ingrid received Kristallen nominations for Best Lead Actor and Actress, respectively. The series' original score was also recognised; Johan Testad earned a nomination for the HARPA Nordic Film Composer Award.

== Cast ==
- Ulf Stenberg as Peter Andersson: a former NHL player who moves his family from Canada to his hometown in Northern Sweden to coach hockey
- Miriam Ingrid as Maya Andersson: a 15-year-old aspiring musician; Peter and Mira's eldest child
- Oliver Dufåker as Kevin Erdahl: the 17-year-old star of the junior hockey team who is under pressure from his father, Mats
- Aliette Opheim as Mira Andersson: Peter's wife and a lawyer who has set aside her own ambitions to accommodate Peter's hockey career
- Tobias Zilliacus as Mats Erdahl: Kevin's demanding and aloof father; financial sponsor for the junior hockey team and a former teammate of Peter's
- Jacob Nordenson as Sune: the veteran sports manager of Beartown's hockey programme; encouraged to retire by the board
- Tomas Bergström as David: the coach of Beartown's junior hockey team until Peter takes over and demotes him to assistant
- Charlotta Jonsson as Maggan Lyt: Niklas and William's hockey-obsessed mother
- Otto Fahlgren as Benji Ovich: the enforcer of the junior hockey team and Kevin's best friend
- Alfons Nordberg as William Lyt: the pest of the junior hockey team
- Erik Lundqvist as Bobo: the largest member of the junior hockey team
- Rasmus Karlsson as Filip: a member of the junior hockey team
- Najdat Rustom as Amat Alfahd: the youngest and fastest member of the junior hockey team who comes from a single-parent immigrant household
- Sanna Niemi as Ana: Maya's new friend from school
- Lukas Wetterberg as Leo: Maya's brother and a hockey player; Peter and Mira's youngest surviving child
- Einar Bredefeldt as Niklas Lyt: William's older brother; a hockey fan who encourages William to play dirty
- Frida Sandberg as Nicki: Kevin's mother
- Hans Blomberg as Robban: a member of the adult hockey team and an old friend of Peter's
- Helen Al-Janabi as Fatima: Amat's single mother who works as a cleaner at the ice skating rink
- Gustav Lindh as Lukas: a young bartender whom Benji is secretly seeing
- Mustapha Aarab as Zack: Amat's friend

== Episodes ==
No.	Title	Directed by	Written by	Original release date
1	"Episode 1"	Peter Grönlund	Anders Weidemann, Antonia Pyk, Linn Gottfridsson	18 October 2020
In a flashforward, a person with a rifle chases another through a snowy forest. In the present, former NHL player Peter returns to his struggling hometown of Beartown—with his wife Mira, daughter Maya, and son Leo—mourning the loss of their youngest, Isak. Peter is disappointed by the senior team's lack of talent and insists on coaching the juniors instead after spotting a star player in Kevin. Kevin's strict father Mats, an influential businessman, resents Peter due to a conflict in their youth. Meanwhile, Maya befriends Ana at school and develops a crush on Kevin, who confides in Benji about liking Maya. Benji, the team's enforcer, is secretly in love with Kevin. Peter replaces David as head coach of the juniors and reshapes the team around each player's strengths. After an argument about Peter, Mats leaves Kevin in the cold. A search party later finds him frostbitten but safe. Under Peter's leadership, the juniors earn a surprise victory. In the final scene, it is revealed that Maya was chasing Kevin with a rifle in the flashforward.
2	"Episode 2"	Peter Grönlund	Anders Weidemann, Antonia Pyk, Linn Gottfridsson	18 October 2020
Kevin receives attention from girls at school, but he is still interested in Maya even though she cares more for music than sports. He invites her to the upcoming semi-final. The board forces longtime coach Sune to retire, and he offers a furious Peter a team member suggestion as a parting gift: Amat, a fast skater who faces racist teasing. He joins the team, but is treated like an outsider. Mats catches Peter practicing outside with Kevin, and says if he sees it again he will call the police. Before the semi-final, Peter motivates the team by telling them that the arena will be closed if they lose. The team wins in part thanks to Amat's speed. At the post-victory party, Kevin connects with Maya, who does not see him merely as a hockey player. Meanwhile, Benji steals a snowmobile and starts a bar fight, where Lukas, the boy he is seeing, works. At the party, Maya goes to Kevin's room, where they kiss. Incensed by her refusal to have sex, Kevin pushes her down and rapes her. Amat opens the door, interrupting the assault.
3	"Episode 3"	Peter Grönlund	Anders Weidemann, Antonia Pyk, Linn Gottfridsson	25 October 2020
Maya struggles with the aftermath of the rape, as the entire town (including her father) celebrates Kevin for leading the team to victory. To distract himself from what he has done, Kevin throws himself into training. Maya fears if she reports Kevin to the police, it will be questioned because she was drunk and flirting with him prior to the assault. She also feels the weight of the entire town's hopes and expectations being placed onto Kevin. Maya confides in Ana about the rape. Maya confronts Kevin at school while secretly recording in an attempt to secure a confession, but he sees through her plan, and she leaves empty-handed. After the confrontation, an alert Benji asks Kevin what happened, and Kevin says he will tell him after the match. In an apparent olive branch, Mats asks to join them on the team bus instead of driving himself. Right before the team is set to leave for the semi-final, Maya tells her mother about the rape. Peter returns home immediately. They take Maya to the police station. The police pick up Kevin from the bus, leaving the team without their coach and star player for the match.
4	"Episode 4"	Peter Grönlund	Anders Weidemann, Antonia Pyk, Linn Gottfridsson	1 November 2020
The team panics about Kevin and Peter's absences. At the police station, both give statements; Kevin claims the sex was consensual. The families run into each other in the lobby, and Peter and Mats attack each other. At the match, Benji gets an early score but is injured by a member of the opposing team. Beartown loses, and David tells the players Maya accused Kevin of rape. When they get home, Mats asks Kevin if he wore a condom and if anyone besides Maya saw what happened. Kevin tells him about Amat. Mats tracks Amat down to offer him regular payments until he gets to the NHL, implicitly on the condition of his silence. Amat accepts, knowing how much the money will mean to his single mother. The players, who believe Maya is lying and blame her for their recent loss, go to Peter's house to confront him for his perceived betrayal. Someone throws a rock through the family's window, sending broken glass onto Leo's bed. The family is distraught. Alone, Peter looks at videos from the party that show an intoxicated Maya flirting with Kevin. The board of directors plots to force Peter out of the coaching position.
5	"Episode 5"	Peter Grönlund	Anders Weidemann, Antonia Pyk, Linn Gottfridsson	8 November 2020
Sune warns Peter that the board wants to vote him out. Peter expresses doubt about what happened at the party, sparking an argument with Mira, who feels he does not believe Maya. Overhearing them, Maya leaves home and is harassed while attempting to hitchhike out of town. Peter gets into a bar brawl with men who insult Maya. At the vote, a drunken Peter defends Maya. Despite his feelings for Kevin, Benji is the first to reject him after Amat vouches for Maya. Peter keeps his job. Amat is beaten by some teammates for speaking out. Bobo decides to defend Amat; he is beaten too. Maya visits Amat in the hospital to thank him. Mats finds Kevin a hockey opportunity in another town; Benji refuses to join him. The police decide not to charge Kevin. Maya chases him through the woods with a rifle, but decides to spare him. Their fathers arrive. Peter embraces Maya, but Kevin rejects Mats' attempts to comfort him. Some time later, the Anderssons share a meal and reminisce about Isak, while Kevin trains alone.

== Production ==
=== Development ===
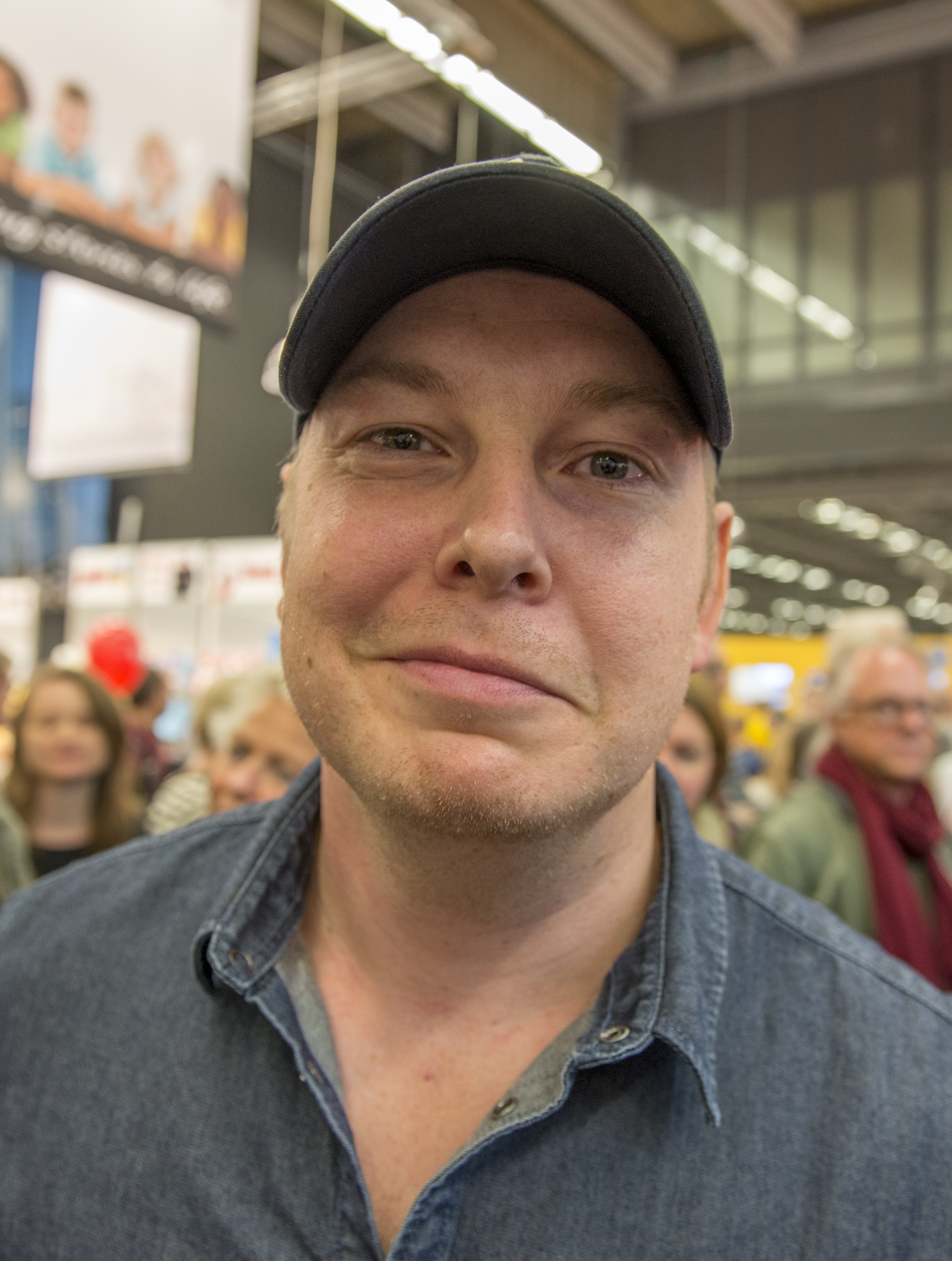
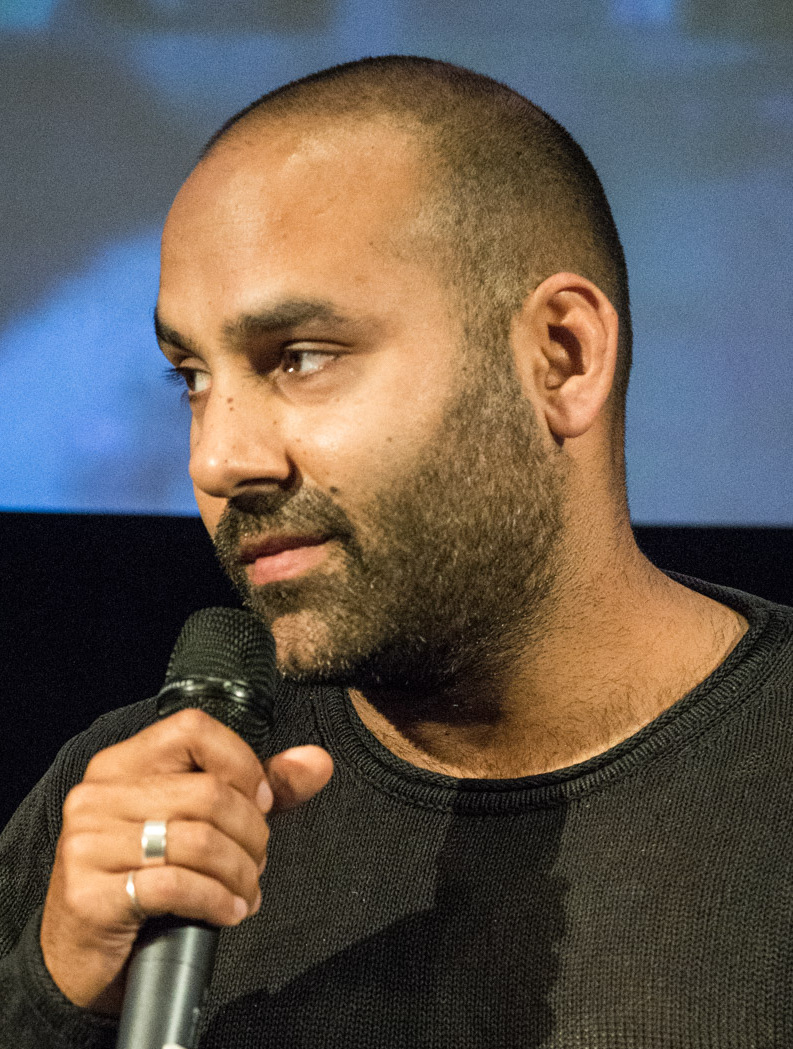
Fredrik Backman (left), author of the novel Beartown, and Peter Grönlund (right), director of the television adaptation

Swedish author Fredrik Backman began writing his fourth novel Björnstad as a television series, which is why it follows multiple characters' perspectives, unlike his previous works. However he ultimately decided, after advice from his wife and agent, that he was not suited to the collaborative and meeting-intensive process of television production. Set in a small town in Northern Sweden, the 2016 novel deals with the aftermath of a talented youth hockey player (Kevin) raping the teenage daughter (Maya) of the team's general manager (Peter). After translation into English by Neil Smith, it was published as Beartown the following year and became a New York Times Best Seller.

In February 2017, the Swedish production company Filmlance International announced they had secured the rights to adapt Beartown into a television series. Filmlance was best known for its co-production of The Bridge (2011–2018), a popular Danish-Swedish crime drama which spurred multiple international remakes. Two other Backman novels had already been adapted for screen: A Man Called Ove (2015) had been released to box office success and Britt-Marie Was Here (2019) was then in production. Beartown was the first Backman novel adapted for television rather than film. Although credited as an executive producer, Backman characterised his involvement in the series as minimal. Explaining his team's approach to screen adaptations, he said: "we try to find the best possible people to work with, ask a lot of questions in advance, but then we move out of the way and let them do their job". (Note: Swedish: vi försöker hitta bästa möjliga människor att jobba med, ställer väldigt många frågor i förväg, men sedan flyttar vi oss ur vägen och låter dem jobba)

Peter Grönlund, the filmmaker behind Drifters (2015) and Goliath (2018), was selected to direct the series. The novel was adapted by Anders Weidemann; he was instructed to develop the script so that it would be commercially viable in Sweden and abroad. He had sketched out a general storyline and written several episode drafts before an American project of his reached the next stage of development, prompting the addition of screenwriters Linn Gottfridsson and Antonia Pyk to the project. They spent about a year collaborating on the script. Several changes to the source material were made while adapting the source material for screen. One was expanding the relationship between Maya and Kevin. In the book, they hardly know each other before the rape, whereas in the series they have a close relationship, a dynamic characterised by Grönlund as a destroyed almost-love story. The story's timeline was compressed and its multi-perspective structure was simplified to focus primarily on three characters: Peter, Maya, and Kevin.

In January 2019, HBO Europe announced Beartown had been greenlit, confirming key cast and crew, including producers Bonnie Skoog Feeney and Mattias Arehn. Beartown marked HBO Europe's second Swedish series, after Lukas Moodysson's Gösta in 2019, and third Scandinavian series, after Gösta and the Norwegian Beforeigners (2019–2021).

=== Casting ===
The primary cast members were Ulf Stenberg, Miriam Ingrid, Oliver Dufåker, Aliette Opheim, and Tobias Zilliacus. As he had done in previous works, Grönlund opted to feature professional actors alongside newcomers who "could relate to the show's environment and its culture." Casting director Maggie Widstrand spoke about the difficulty of finding young prospective actors with hockey experience from the region. She travelled around Norrland and emailed numerous schools during the process. The production team visited hockey clubs in Northern Sweden. Hockey experience was a major consideration, as the series would otherwise require stunt doubles or extensive training for actors. Actors who played on the fictional junior hockey team were recruited from Norrbotten and speak with the characteristic regional dialect. Dufåker had no acting experience before being cast as Kevin Erdahl, but played junior hockey in Luleå, Boden, and Timrå. Stenberg, who played a lead role of hockey coach Peter Andersson, was born in Boden and raised in Umeå. He noted that the locker room talk shown in the series was similar to what he observed growing up, and that he recognised himself in the character he played. Other actors in the series with roots in Northern Sweden include Otto Fahlgren, Charlotta Jonsson, Einar Bredefeldt, Najdat Rustom, Alfons Nordberg, and Sanna Niemi. Extras were also recruited from the region.

=== Filming and post-production ===
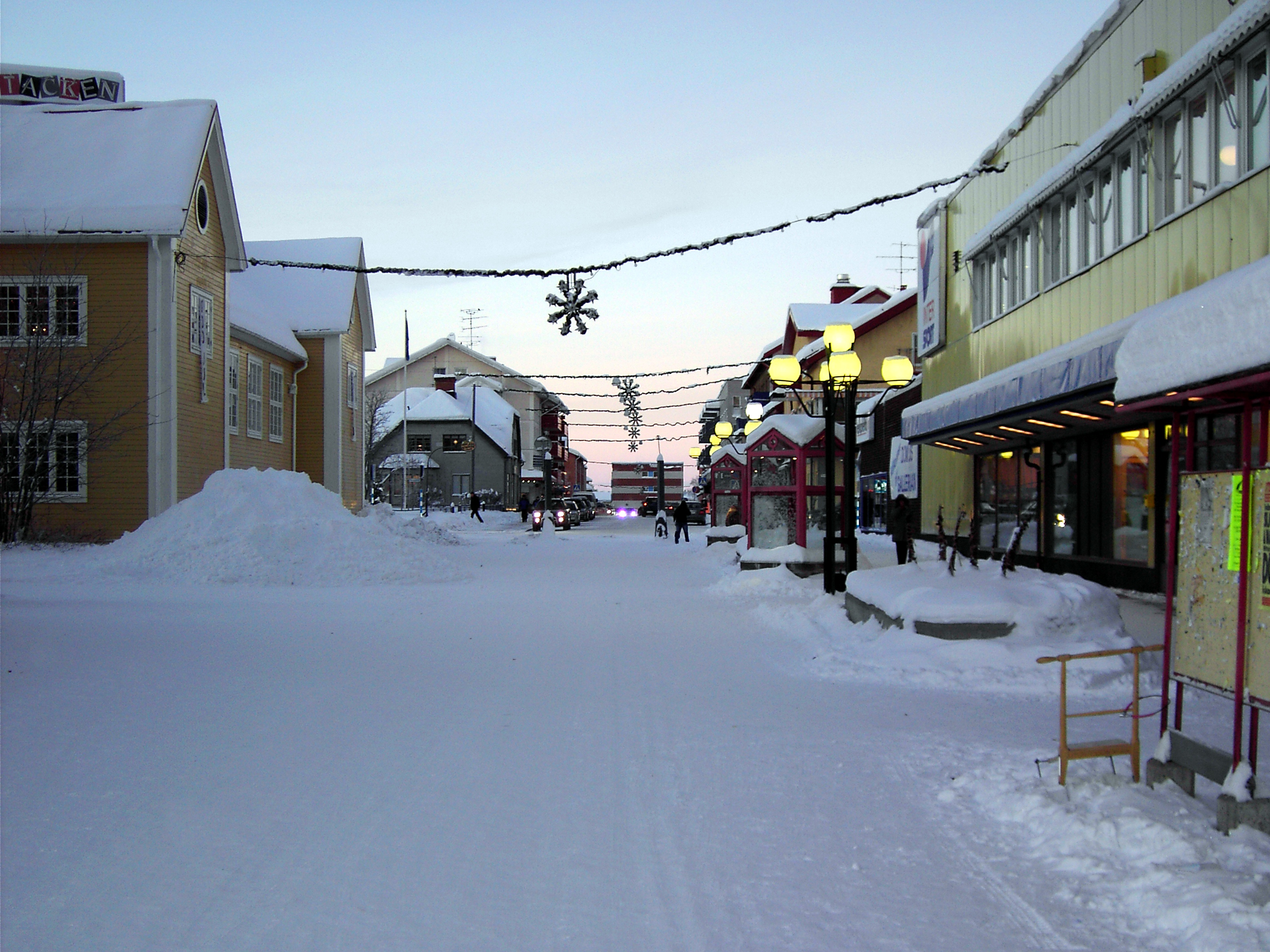
Beartown was mostly filmed in Gällivare.

With a 72-day shooting schedule, filming began on 4 February 2019 and finished in May. The series was primarily shot in Gällivare, with many scenes filmed at the ice rink there. Other settlements in Norrbotten County were also used, including Övertorneå, Haparanda, Kalix, Malmberget, and Kiruna. With snow depths up to 1.5 metres (4.9 ft) and temperatures as low as −35 °C (−31 °F), the difficult conditions caused camera malfunctions. Petrus Sjövik served as the cinematographer and Aimee McDaniel as the sports choreographer. By the onset of the COVID-19 pandemic, Beartown had finished editing, so it was able to proceed with its planned release date, but post-production such as automated dialogue replacement had to be done remotely.

=== Music ===
The series' original score was composed by Johan Testad. He had previously worked on several projects with Grönlund, including Goliath, for which he won a Guldbagge Award for Best Original Score. Beartown's official soundtrack also featured one song each by myie and Lasse Nystromz Orkester. Ingrid uses the name myie for her music.

Björnstad: HBO Europe Official Series Soundtrack
No.	Title	Length
1.	"Introduction"	1:25
2.	"Off to Work"	2:13
3.	"Looking for Kevin"	6:58
4.	"Maya Plays"	1:27
5.	"Beartown"	2:22
6.	"Maya & Kevin"	2:56
7.	"Amat vs. Bobo"	3:53
8.	"Benji"	1:24
9.	"After"	1:16
10.	"Devastated"	1:12
11.	"The Morning After"	1:33
12.	"Better"	2:32
13.	"Telling the Truth"	5:00
14.	"Everything's Changed"	1:11
15.	"Amat's Lie"	2:17
16.	"Lost"	4:13
17.	"Beartown II"	1:38
18.	"Are You OK?"	1:12
19.	"It's Bad"	1:22
20.	"Dropped"	2:03
21.	"Going"	1:42
22.	"Maya Plays II"	0:58
23.	"Beartown III"	1:22
24.	"The End"	2:47
25.	"Painted Lady" (myie)	4:10
26.	"Björnstads AIF" (Lasse Nystromz Orkester)	2:45
Total length:		61:52

== Marketing and release ==
Beartown was previewed at the Nordic TV Drama Vision event in January 2020. In June, HBO announced via press release that the series would premiere in the autumn simultaneously on HBO Nordic and HBO Europe. The announcement was accompanied by the release of the first still photographs and a teaser. On 18 October, the first two episodes of Beartown premiered, with the remaining three being released weekly afterwards. By 30 November, it was the tenth most-watched series on HBO Nordic. The series premiered to North American audiences on 22 February 2021 via Max. Beartown and other Scandinavian productions were later removed from the platform, with a spokesperson from HBO remarking that the change was due to a planned upcoming merger between HBO Max and Discovery+. In 2023, Beartown and 20 other programmes were picked up by SkyShowtime. After a period of inaccessibility due to the network shuffling, the series was again made available for streaming via SVT Play on 1 April 2026.

== Reception ==
=== Critical response ===
On the review aggregator website Rotten Tomatoes, 93% of 14 critics' reviews are positive, with an average rating of 7.8/10. Its consensus reads: "Acutely observed and coiled with dread, Beartown is an intelligent sports drama that explores how the culture of an insular community can be complicit in a crime." Metacritic, which uses a weighted average, gave Beartown a score of 82 out of 100 based on 7 critics, indicating "universal acclaim". Domestically, the series earned an average rating of 3.8/5 based on 19 critics on the Swedish review aggregator site Kritiker. It was featured on several best-of lists in Sweden. Hugo Lindqvist of Dagens Nyheter, who regarded Beartown as one of the best programmes of the year, concluded it was "a superbly acted and melancholically beautiful homecoming story—at times so striking it feels like taking a puck to the stomach". (Note: Swedish: en ypperligt välspelad och melankoliskt vacker hemvändarskildring – i stunder så drabbande att det känns som att en av puckarna gått rätt in i magen) Ranking it second-best of the year for Aftonbladet, Karolina Fjellborg praised all aspects of the series. Jonatan Blomberg of MovieZine called it the best new Swedish series and the fifth-best overall of the year. In Elle Sweden, Louise Berglund and Louise Åström listed it at #3.

Critical opinions were largely positive on the effectiveness of the adaptation. Kaveh Jalinous of Under the Radar praised the decision to adapt the novel into a series rather than a film given its narrative complexity. Positive reviews of the writing also came from Jan Andersson of Göteborgs-Posten, who considered it a wholly successful adaptation of Backman's novel, and Shane Ryan of Paste, who felt the plot was "masterfully handled". Malin Slotte agreed in Hufvudstadsbladet, deeming the story "really well-told and engaging". (Note: Swedish: riktigt välberättad och engagerande) On the other hand, Valerie Ettenhofer of Film School Rejects considered the series underwritten, saying: "adaptation takes a once-rich story and strips it down until it becomes too thin to support the weight of its own heavy themes". Others—Jacob Lundström of Dagens Nyheter and Karoline Eriksson of Svenska Dagbladet—found the writing generally effective, while noting a few perceived shortcomings with subtlety. One recurring point of criticism was the handling of subplots and secondary characters. Jalinous felt that the aspects of the story unrelated to hockey or the rape were underdeveloped. Ashlie D. Stevens of Salon considered some characters to be overly flat. Lundström cited Peter's wife Mira as an insufficiently explored character. Melanie Åström agreed in Norrländska Socialdemokraten; writing that Mira was "yet another woman whose role merely enables the man to pursue his higher-priority career". (Note: Swedish: ännu en kvinna vars roll enbart möjliggör för mannen att utöva sitt högre prioriterade yrke) Åström considered the worst aspect of the series to be the lack of resolution for Benji's character arc.

The technical execution and atmosphere created by Grönlund and cinematographer Petrus Sjövik were commended by critics. Lundström cited the production as a rarely authentic portrayal of small-town life in Norrbotten. Shane Ryan in Paste too highlighted Grönlund's direction, noting an "almost Robert Altman-esque vibe" to the overlapping dialogue. He also praised the series for a realistic depiction of the sport. John Doyle echoed this sentiment in The Globe and Mail, calling the on-ice scenes "thrillingly authentic." Baker commended the series' sports choreographer Aimee McDaniel for focusing on "mundane necessities like D-to-D passes" rather than flashy athletic displays. A dissenting perspective came from Michael Tapper of Sydsvenskan; he argued Grönlund's direction lacked nerve and that the series only came to life via editing during the hockey matches.

The performances of the cast, which was composed of established actors and newcomers, received positive reviews. Lundström remarked that the series was "so well-acted and committed that the icy cold burns your face". (Note: Swedish: så välspelad och engagerad att iskylan bränner i kinderna) He praised Stenberg's portrayal of Peter's "confident but misguided masculinity". (Note: Swedish: självsäker men vilsen manlighet) Eriksson and Andersson also singled out Stenberg as particularly impactful. Ettenhofer and Ryan regarded Ingrid as the most compelling performance; multiple reviewers felt that Maya completely transformed during the course of the series from a giddy teenager to a haunted survivor. Dufåker's acting debut as Kevin Erdahl was also well-received. Åström and Lundström both noted a strong portrayal of his character's dual emotions. In contrast, Andersson was less impressed by the younger amateur actors.

=== Accolades ===
Award	Year	Category	Recipient(s)	Result	Ref.
Kristallen	2021	Best Actor	Ulf Stenberg	Nominated	
Kristallen	2021	Best Actress	Miriam Ingrid	Nominated	
HARPA	2022	Nordic Film Composer	Johan Testad	Nominated	

== See also ==
- Misogyny in ice hockey
- Ice hockey in popular culture
