= Nocturne (TV series) =

2026 American crime drama series

- Release poster
- Genre: Crime drama
- Created by: Rowan Joffé
- Based on: The Sandman by Lars Kepler
- Developed by: John Hlavin
- Starring: Liev Schreiber; Zazie Beetz; Chrissy Metz; Gary Carr; Rory Culkin; Poorna Jagannathan; Landon Valentin; Bill Camp; Stephen Graham
- Music by: Toydrum
- Country of origin: United States
- Original language: English
- No. of seasons: 1
- No. of episodes: 5

Production
- Executive producers: Zazie Beetz; David Rysdahl; Liev Schreiber; Lars Kepler; Niclas Salomonsson; Øystein Karlsen; Dorothy Fortenberry; Heather Kadin; Peter Micelli; Jack Whigham; Barry Jossen; Tana Jamieson; Tim Van Patten; Rowan Joffé; John Hlavin
- Cinematography: David Franco; John Grillo; Eric Moynier
- Editors: Colleen Sharp; Paul Penczner; Curtis Thurber; William Yeh
- Running time: 46–62 minutes
- Production companies: Degraw Street Productions; Fountain Films; String & Dobbs; A+E Studios

Original release
- Network: Apple TV
- Release: October 30, 2026 – present

Nocturne is an American crime drama television limited series created by Rowan Joffé and developed by John Hlavin. The series is based on the Joona Linna novel The Sandman by the husband-and-wife team Alexander Ahndoril and Alexandra Coelho Ahndoril, who use the pen name Lars Kepler.

The series premiered on October 30, 2026, and received positive reviews.

The series has 10 episodes.

== Premise ==
A former homicide detective relocates to a small Pennsylvania town, which comes under attack by an imprisoned serial killer.

== Cast and characters ==
=== Main ===
- Liev Schreiber as Jonah Lynn, a former homicide detective
- Zazie Beetz as Saga Bauer, an undercover FBI agent and Jonah's surrogate daughter
- Chrissy Metz as Ida Frost, Michael's mother
- Gary Carr as Nathan Pollack
- Rory Culkin as Karl Anders, a nurse at Riverside Psychiatric Hospital
- Poorna Jagannathan as Alexandra Quinn, an FBI special agent in charge
- Landon Valentin as Michael Frost, a teen who went missing for three years who is suddenly found on the Butler Bridge
- Bill Camp as Dave Ellison
- Stephen Graham as Jurek Walter, a serial killer imprisoned in the basement of Riverside Psychiatric Hospital

=== Guest ===
- Gameela Wright as Rola Brolin
- Winsome Brown as Annie Fontaine
- Luke Robertson as man
- Anne Windsland as Agent Hawthorne
- Rae Gray as Officer Winslow
- Shane Callahan as Benny Zalesky
- Gabe Fazio as Sam Mendel
- Joie Lee as Denise Bauer
- Scott A. Martin as Gary Mazur, a nurse
- Caroline Neff as Vee
- Michael Ornstein as Stan
- Pascale Armand as Marcelline
- Ryan Buggle as Kevin

== Episodes ==
No.	Title	Directed by	Teleplay by	Original release date
1	"Lazarus, Come Forth!"	Tim Van Patten	Rowan Joffé	October 30, 2026
2	"For Such a Time as This"	Tim Van Patten	Rowan Joffé & John Hlavin	October 30, 2026
3	"Eyes on the Inside"	Allen Coulter	Dorothy Fortenberry & Lee Edward Colston II	November 6, 2026
4	"The Courier"	Allen Coulter	Matthew Newman & Jenina Kibuka	November 13, 2026
5	"Solitude"	Logan Kibens	Rowan Joffé & John Hlavin	November 20, 2026
6	"Only Connect"	Logan Kibens	Dorothy Fortenberry & Lee Edward Colston II	November 27, 2026

== Production ==
It was announced in February 2023 that Apple TV+ was developing the series, initially titled Lazarus, with Tom Hardy and Zazie Beetz set to star in and serve as executive producers for the series. The series was greenlit in May 2025, with Liev Schreiber and Stephen Graham joining the series with Graham replacing Hardy in his role. Bill Camp, Rory Culkin, Chrissy Metz, and Gary Carr were added to the series regular cast in the following months, while Poorna Jagannathan joined the cast in a recurring role.

Principal photography on the series began in mid-2025 in Pittsburgh. Scenes were shot in New Kensington, Pennsylvania, in November, with Parallax serving as its working title.

== Release ==
The series was released on October 30, 2026.

== Reception ==
On the review aggregator website Rotten Tomatoes, the series holds an approval rating of 85%, based on 40 reviews, with an average of rated reviews of 7.1/10. The website's critics consensus reads, "A cat-and-mouse chiller that oozes mystery at every corner, Nocturne dismantles the crime thriller genre while Stephen Graham's sinister performance leads viewers down the entertainment rabbit hole." Metacritic, which uses a weighted average, assigned a score of 70 out of 100 based on 21 critics, indicating "generally favorable" reviews.
