= List of programs broadcast by C More =

This is a list of programs broadcast by C More Entertainment in Scandinavia.

== 0-9 ==
Original title	Country	Norwegian title	Genre
30 Rock	USA		Comedy

== A ==
Original title	Country	Norwegian title	Genre
The American Embassy	USA		Drama
Angels in America	USA		Drama

== B ==
Original title	Country	Norwegian title	Genre
Big Love	USA		Drama
The Black Donnellys	USA		Drama
Boardwalk Empire	USA		Drama
The Borgias	CAN HUN IRE		Drama
Boss	USA		Drama

== C ==
Original title	Country	Norwegian title	Genre
Carnivàle	USA		Drama
Coupling	USA		Sitcom
Curb Your Enthusiasm	USA	Slapp av Larry!	Comedy

== D ==
Original title	Country	Norwegian title	Genre
The Daily Show with Jon Stewart	USA		Talkshow
Dexter	USA		Thriller

== E ==
Original title	Country	Norwegian title	Genre
Eleventh Hour	USA		Drama
Enlightened	USA		Comedy-drama
Entourage	USA		Comedy drama

== F ==
Original title	Country	Norwegian title	Genre
Falling Skies	USA		Science fiction
Farscape	USA		Science fiction
Five Days	GBR		Drama
The Flight of the Conchords	USA		Comedy
Funky Cops	USA		Animation
Funny or Die Presents	USA	Funny or Die	Comedy

== G ==
Original title	Country	Norwegian title	Genre
Game of Thrones	USA		Drama
Girls	USA		Comedy-drama
God, the Devil and Bob	USA		Animation

== H ==
Original title	Country	Norwegian title	Genre
Harsh Realm	USA		Science fiction
Heroes	USA		Adventure
House	USA		Medical drama
How to Make It in America	USA		Comedy-drama
Hung	USA		Comedy-drama

== I ==
Original title	Country	Norwegian title	Genre
In Treatment	USA		Drama
Interrogation	USA		Crime drama

== J ==
Original title	Country	Norwegian title	Genre
Jack & Bobby	USA		Drama
John from Cincinnati	USA		Comedy drama

== K ==
Original title	Country	Norwegian title	Genre
Kingdom Hospital	USA		Horror
Kung Faux	USA		Comedy

== L ==
Original title	Country	Norwegian title	Genre
Less than Perfect	USA		Sitcom
The Life and Times of Tim	CAN		Animation
Lipstick Jungle	USA		Comedy drama
Lucky Louie	USA		Sitcom

== M ==
Original title	Country	Norwegian title	Genre
Mad Men	USA		Drama
Masters of Horror	USA		Horror anthology
Monk	USA		Crime comedy

== N ==
Original title	Country	Norwegian title	Genre
The No. 1 Ladies' Detective Agency	USA GBR	Damenes detektivbyrå nr. 1	Crime drama
Normal, Ohio	USA		Sitcom

== P ==
Original title	Country	Norwegian title	Genre
The Pacific	USA		War
Parks and Recreation	USA		Comedy
Person of Interest	USA		Action drama
Pushing Daisies	USA		Crime comedy

== Q ==
Original title	Country	Norwegian title	Genre
Quads!	CAN		Animation
Queer as Folk	USA		Comedy

== R ==
Original title	Country	Norwegian title	Genre
The Ricky Gervais Show	USA		Animation
Rome	USA		Drama

== S ==
Original title	Country	Norwegian title	Genre
Seinfeld	USA		Sitcom
Shameless	USA		Drama
The Shield	USA		Crime
Six Feet Under	USA		Comedy drama
South Park	USA		Animation
Starz the Hollywood Reporter	USA		Entertainment news
Strike Back	UK		Action drama
Surface	USA		Adventure

== T ==
Original title	Country	Norwegian title	Genre
Taken	USA		Science fiction
Tell Me You Love Me	USA		Comedy drama
That's My Bush!	USA		Sitcom
Thief	USA		Drama
This Is England '86	UK		Drama
Trailer Park Boys	CAN		Comedy
Treme	USA		Drama
True Blood	USA		Drama

== V ==
Original title	Country	Norwegian title	Genre
V	USA		Science fiction

== W ==
Original title	Country	Norwegian title	Genre
Weeds	USA		Comedy
