= Johan Testad =

Swedish composer (born 1973)

- Born: 1973 (age 52–53); Solna, Sweden
- Occupation: Composer
- Website: johantestad.com

Johan Testad (born 1973) is a Swedish composer. He won Guldbagge Award for Best Original Score for his work on Goliath (2018).

== Life and career ==
He studied music in Gävle, before being introduced to film score composition through Daniel Wallentin, then a filmmaking student at the Dramatiska Institutet. He wrote the music for the 2007 film adaptation of Jonas Hassen Khemiri's novel One Eye Red. In 2012, Testad formed the band Tibble Transsibiriska. The group's work is inspired by Romani folk music; they released their first album in 2015. Testad has collaborated numerous times with filmmaker Peter Grönlund, including on Goliath (2018), for which Testad won Guldbagge Award for Best Original Score. For the original score of Beartown (2020), Testad nominated for a 2022 HARPA Nordic Film Composer Award. He composed the music for Försvunna människor (2022) and the Spotify audio drama De fria. He also composed the score for the Netflix series Land of Sin, a 2026 crime drama series created by Grönlund.
