= Nora Rios =

Swedish actress (born 1999)

- Born: 24 September 1999 (age 27); Stockholm, Sweden
- Occupation: Actress
- Years active: 2013–present

Nora Rios (born 29 September 1999) is a Swedish actress, known for her roles in Caliphate (2020), Heartbeats (2022–2023), and Life on Seacrow Island (2025). She has been nominated for a Kristallen Award for Best Actress and the Rising Star Award at the Stockholm International Film Festival.

== Life and career ==
Nora Rios was born on 29 September 1999 in Stockholm, Sweden. Her Peruvian father and Swedish mother met while working as guides in Cusco; they moved to Sweden before her birth. She has two younger siblings: a sister and a brother. She grew up in the Eriksberg neighbourhood of Uppsala and often spent summers in the Norrtälje area. When she was about 12, her mother began bringing her to castings. Her first acting role was in a Spanish-language Utbildningsradion (UR) programme. She considered a career in journalism and completed a two-week work experience placement at Uppsalatidningen. After early roles in Bankrånet (2013), Arne Dahl: Mörkertal (2015), Beck – Sista dagen (2016), she moved to Stockholm at the age of 16 to study theatre at Södra Latin. Shortly after graduating, she had a lead role in Arkeologens dotter (2018), another UR programme. Rios played Nim, a 16-year-old girl who travels through time to search for her missing archaeologist mother.

Her breakout role was in Caliphate (2020) as Sulle, a high school student whose previously normal life transforms under the influence of Islamic State propaganda. Reflecting on her character, Rios felt Sulle's perceptiveness and intelligence did not prevent her from being deceived. She was nominated for the Rising Star Award at the Stockholm International Film Festival the same year. In 2021, she played a rape victim named Marta in the second season of Honour, a thriller about a female-led law firm that represents vulnerable women. She appeared in Heartbeats, a C More programme created by Linn Mannheimer based on the Norwegian series Hjerteslag. The first season premiered in January 2022. Rios played Mio, a free-spirited party girl who becomes pregnant after a chance fling with Anders, an introverted KTH student played by Simon Edenroth. She was nominated for a Kristallen for Best Actress for Heartbeats. The series was renewed and the second season premiered the following November, with both Rios and Edenroth reprising their roles.

In the autumn of 2025, she moved to Gothenburg to study directing at HDK-Valand. Rios played a young radical named Max in An Honest Life (2025). She starred as Malin Melkersson in the SVT production Life on Seacrow Island, which was released on 31 October 2025. The series was a remake of a 1964 series of the same name written by Astrid Lindgren. It was announced that she will play one of the leading roles in the Amazon Prime psychological thriller series Sarek alongside Kitt Walker Johansson, Alva Bratt, and Felix Sandman. It is expected to premiere in 2027.

== Acting credits ==
Key
†	Denotes work that has not yet been released

=== Film ===
Year	Title	Role	Notes	Ref.
2022	Black Crab	Deidre		
2025	An Honest Life	Max		

=== Television ===
Year	Title	Role	Notes	Ref.
2013	Bankrånet			
2015	Arne Dahl: Mörkertal			
2016	Beck – Sista dagen		Television film	
2018	Arkeologens dotter	Nim		
2020	Caliphate	Sulle		
2021	Honour	Marta	Season 2	
2022–2023	Heartbeats	Mio		
2022	Meningen med livet			
2022	The Head	Gloria	Season 2	
2025	Life on Seacrow Island	Malin		
2027	Sarek†			
