= The Hypnotist (novel) =

2009 novel by Lars Kepler

- Author: Lars Kepler
- Original title: Hypnotisören
- Translator: Ann Long
- Language: Swedish
- Series: Inspector Joona Linna
- Genre: Crime novel
- Publisher: Albert Bonniers Förlag (Swedish); Farrar, Straus and Giroux (English)
- Publication date: 2009
- Publication place: Sweden
- English publication date: 2011
- Media type: Print (Hardback & Paperback)
- Pages: 571 (Swedish); 503 (English)
- ISBN: 9789100124045 (Swedish); 9780374173951 (English)
- Followed by: The Nightmare

The Hypnotist (Swedish: Hypnotisören) is a crime novel by the Swedish husband-wife writing team of Alexander Ahndoril and Alexandra Coelho Ahndoril, published under the name Lars Kepler. It was first published in Sweden in 2009 and translated into English in 2011 by Ann Long. In 2012, it was adapted into a film.

== Plot ==
A man is discovered murdered in the bathroom of a locker room. Upon going to the man's residence, a policeman finds the man's wife and young daughter brutally murdered as well as his son, Josef Ek, who is also gravely injured but alive. Soon after investigation, led by Joona Linna, it is discovered that the murdered man also had an older daughter, Evelyn Ek, who was not found at the crime scene. Afraid the daughter may be alive but in danger of being tracked by the murderer, Joona is desperate to question Josef but the boy is in shock and in no condition to be interrogated. It is advised by the medical staff to call on Erik Maria Bark, an expert in trauma victims and hypnotism, to try to hypnotize Josef to try to get some information about the murders and location of his sister. Erik initially refuses to perform the hypnosis (he had promised to never hypnotize a person again) but eventually gives in at the possibility of saving the sister's life. However, under hypnosis, it becomes apparent that Josef was in fact the killer and that his injuries are self inflicted. Theoretically, no one can lie under hypnosis and he has confessed to murder; however, a statement under hypnosis cannot be used as evidence.

News of the supposed confession leaks to the media, who then publicly attack Erik's use of hypnotism, questioning the legality of coercing a confession through hypnotism. Josef expresses anger toward Erik and expresses the urge to get revenge for being hypnotized. At home, Erik has marital issues with his wife Simone due to an act of infidelity 10 years ago and brought up again by a false suspicion that Erik is having a new affair with a female colleague, as well as arguments over Erik's dependent use of medication for sleep. Erik's teenage son Benjamin has a blood disease that necessitates he receive a shot one a week or risk bleeding to death from even a simple scratch because his blood does not coagulate. Benjamin's girlfriend is Aida, who is a tattooed older girl with a mother with health issues and a younger brother, Nicky, who is mentally challenged. One morning, Simone wakes to find their door, and refrigerator door, open. She informs Erik that she is worried someone broke in, but Erik does not believe her. Joona, meanwhile, gathers evidence supporting that Josef was in fact the killer, but Josef escapes the hospital after hearing that he will be arrested, killing a nurse in the process. Joona tracks down Evelyn at an aunt's cottage. It is revealed that Josef had violent tendencies in the past and had repeatedly molested Evelyn, asking for sexual favors. Evelyn had convinced Josef that they could not have sex because of the age of legal consent (15 years old). As Josef's 15th birthday approached, she ran away to her aunt's cottage to avoid Josef's sexual advances. She was discovered there by Josef, but refused his request for sex. Enraged by this, he told her that he would kill the family to punish her and that it would be her fault. Evelyn is moved to a secure apartment under police watch.

Arguments between Erik and Simone result in Erik sleeping separately from Simone. During the night, Simone is woken by a pain in her arm only to see the shape of someone leaving her bedroom. She follows out to the hall, feeling the effect of some drug taking effect, and sees Benjamin being dragged out of their apartment before Simone collapses without having seen who the abductor is. It is suspected that Josef kidnapped Benjamin.

The kidnapping case doesn't fall onto Joona Linna's office, but onto some random town police officer who doesn't consider it a priority. Simone decides to have her father, Kennet (a former inspector), help find Benjamin. This is against Erik's wishes because he believes it to be impossible to work together with Kennet because they do not get along. Consequently, Erik moves out of the apartment to his office and tries to get Joona to take the case. Kennet and Simone find that Josef has been hiding in a secret room in the basement of Josef's family home, but are interrupted by police before uncovering him, giving Josef his chance to escape. It is discovered that Josef did not have Benjamin in this hiding space and, therefore, was not likely the kidnapper.

Erik receives a phone call from Benjamin who says that he is in the trunk of a car being driven to a place the abductor called the haunted house. Joona takes the case and urges Erik to think back on people from his past who may have a reason to want to hurt him or his family. The novel gives a flashback of about 10 years ago. During that time, Erik was treating doing research treating trauma with group hypnosis. A new patient joined the group with particularly distressing behavior, Eva Blau, who had broken into his home. Also recounted is Erik's affair with a colleague and Simone's discovery of the affair. During a group hypnosis session, a patient, named Lydia, describes taking actions to hurt her child in a cage. Erik tells this to child services and they enter Lydia's home only to find she had never had a child, and Lydia attempts suicide. Surviving her suicide attempt, Lydia blames Erik, his ability to perform medicine is suspended, his research is ended, and he promises to never perform hypnosis again. After this flashback, their first suspect is Eva Blau, but after finding that she had committed suicide, they suspect the kidnapper to be Lydia. Kennet interrogated Benjamin's girlfriend Aida and discovers that there had been a woman claiming to be Benjamin's real mother and that Benjamin's real name was Kasper (the name Lydia used to call her child during group hypnosis). At Lydia's residence, the body of a young child was found that had been buried 10 years ago. It is found that Lydia did, in fact, have a child 10 years ago whom she had kidnapped, trapped in a cage for 3 years, and killed once she realized Erik would be coming with child services.

Benjamin has been kidnapped by Lydia and is being held captive by her and a couple other former patients from Erik's hypnosis group. Joona, Erik, and Simone finally find Benjamin hidden in a cottage in the middle of the mountains close to a lake in time to save him from the madwoman, Lydia, who is going to "discipline" him by cutting off the tip of his nose with scissors, probably causing wounds which would have killed him. Benjamin, thanks to the distraction of Lydia by one of the other captors, has run away from the cottage and is hiding in one of the vehicles, a bus, on the land, wrapped in a blanket to ward off hypothermia. Seeing his parents and Joona struggling against Lydia and the other captors, Benjamin breaks up the confrontation using the bus. Lydia overpowers Benjamin, gets into the driver's seat, and commences to try to escape by driving over the ice, but the ice breaks under the bus and commences to sink. Erik rescues Benjamin from the sinking bus, but Erik and Lydia are trapped on the bus as it sinks. Erik is saved by a rope attached to a life preserver wrapped around him, with Simone and Benjamin pulling him up to safety. The novel ends with the Bark family eating a meal at McDonald's on Christmas Eve, glad to be together but knowing that it will be a rough road ahead as they recover from the trauma they have gone through.

== Publishing history ==
The first English edition (512 pages, hardcover) of The Hypnotist was published by Farrar, Straus and Giroux in 2011. The English translation was written by Ann Long.

== See also ==
- The Hypnotist (2012 film)
