= Paolo Vacirca =

Swedish film director

Paolo Salvatore Vacirca (born 31 October 1982), is a Swedish screenwriter and story developer, and former head of development/development executive at AB Svensk Filmindustri.

He is the scriptwriter of the film The Hypnotist based on the best seller by Lars Kepler.
