= An Honest Life =

2025 Swedish drama-thriller film

- English-language promotional poster
- Swedish: Ett ärligt liv
- Directed by: Mikael Marcimain
- Written by: Linn Gottfridsson
- Starring: Simon Lööf; Nora Rios; Peter Andersson
- Release date: 31 July 2025
- Running time: 122 minutes
- Country: Sweden
- Language: Swedish

An Honest Life (Swedish: Ett ärligt liv) is a 2025 Swedish drama-thriller film directed by Mikael Marcimain and written by Linn Gottfridsson. Based on Joakim Zander's novel of the same name, the film follows a cynical law student (Simon Lööf) as he falls in love with a young radical (Nora Rios) led by an anti-establishment retired professor (Peter Andersson). An Honest Life premiered on Netflix on 31 July 2025. The film received mixed reviews; although the thematic messaging and writing received criticism, the performance of the three lead actors was praised.

== Plot ==
In a flash-forward, Simon views expensive watches at a Danish boutique with Max. A customer nearby collapses, causing a commotion which draws away the attendant. A phone on the counter rings, and a voice tells Simon to steal the watches as his test.

Simon arrives at Lund University with plans of studying law. He happens upon a robbery, and is beaten by a police officer who thinks he is involved. One of the masked robbers knocks out the police officer and leaves without further explanation. Simon has rented a room in an expensive apartment, and wants to fit in with his upper-class roommates. At the library, he recognizes the girl who was involved in the robbery. He happens upon her in the rain by chance, and comes to know her as Max. His roommates invite him to a formal dinner, but treat him like a waiter and have him clean up afterwards.

Max picks him up in a van and takes him to the seaside, where they go cliff jumping. Simon is seriously hurt. Max's sister Dinah examines him and offers him some pain relievers. Together they drive to Grey Gardens, a cottage owned by Charles, a retired professor who acts as a leader of an anti-establishment student group. Charles advocates for radical honesty, and believes one's actions and opinions should be the same. Max tells him he fits in with the group and kisses him.

Simon steals the watch on a trip with Max, fulfilling his test to join Charles' group. He is initially disturbed but soon falls in with the camaraderie of the "bandits." He goes skinny-dipping with Max and they have sex on the beach. Simon informs his roommates that he wants to move out. In response, Ludvig reads Simon's diary aloud to embarrass him. The bandits attend a masquerade party, where he sees Max about to have sex with Ludvig. He starts a fight with Victor, and gets his average exam results. He talks with Max, who explains that she only slept with Ludvig to get the keys to his parents' house in Malmö. The bandits want to vandalize the home, but their burglary goes awry when Robin shoots the family's housekeeper. Max is pulled over by police while Robin and Simon are hiding in the back of the van. The police open the trunk and they pepper-spray the police to make their get-away. Charles, who already found out about the shooting online, confronts them when they get back to the cottage. An altercation ensues. Simon wants to leave but Max shows him proof of his involvement. Ludvig is upset about his housekeeper's shooting.

Simon gets the address of a former bandit from Charles. When he goes there, the man has been reported missing, but Simon learns he was also swindled by Max. He also learns the real names of the gang members. When he returns to the cottage, he finds Charles has shot himself. He meets with Max in a hotel room. The bandits tie up Simon and pull off another heist, but Simon escapes and prevents them from shooting a guard (although a bandit is shot accidentally). The group flees from the police. Simon tells Max that he knows her real name (Lea Valverde), as well as the names of her accomplices, and that if anything happens to him, they will all be exposed.

== Cast ==
- Simon Lööf as Simon: a first-year law student from a typical, non-wealthy background
- Nora Rios as Max / Lea Valverde: a member of Professor Charles' group
- Peter Andersson as Charles: an anti-establishment retired professor
- Willy Ramnek Petri as Robin / Axel: a member of Professor Charles' group
- Nathalie Merchant as Dinah / Belinda Valverde: Max's older sister with a drug problem
- Christoffer Rigeblad as Ludvig Rehnskiöld: Simon's upper-class roommate
- Fabian Hedlund as Victor Wehlin: Simon's upper-class roommate

== Production ==
The film is based on Joakim Zander's novel of the same name. The screenplay was written by Linn Gottfridsson and the director was Mikael Marcimain. Filming began in Lund in the autumn of 2023. Some action scenes were filmed at Tranchellska huset in Landskrona over a four-day period. They also filmed on the Öresund Bridge. During a night shoot there, actress Nora Rios was questioned by police after the car she was driving (which contained counterfeit drugs) became separated from the production crew. Filming had wrapped by the following January.

== Marketing and release ==
The premiere date was announced on 24 June 2025, accompanied by stills and a promotional clip from the film. It premiered on Netflix on 31 July.

== Reception ==
On the Swedish review aggregator website Kritiker, the film earned an average rating of 3.7/5 based on 7 critics' reviews. In a mixed review for Dagens Nyheter, Wanda Bendjelloul criticised the film's thematic handling of social class, stating that the lack of explanation given for the anarchist group's motivations made the film difficult to understand. She also felt the conflict between Simon and his upper-class roommates suffered from unsubtle writing. In a review for But Why Tho?, Jason Flatt also strongly critiqued the film's messaging, which he felt was disingenuous and represented an offensive caricature of both leftism and resistance movements. He also took issue with a lack of clear motivation ascribed to members of the anarchist group, and the contrastingly sympathetic portrayal of the film's wealthy characters. Ultimately, he concluded it was "anti-leftist tome masquerading inside a trite anti-rich misfire." John Serba of Decider similarly gave the film a negative review, deeming it both "derivative and mediocre."

The performances of the main cast received generally strong reviews. Peter Andersson's performance as a retired professor turned anarchist leader received particular acclaim in Göteborgs-Posten. Bendjelloul also described him as a scene-stealer, as well as praising the other two leads. In Aftonbladet, Siri Vaara called Simon Lööf's performance fantastic, stating he evoked a young Simon J. Berger.
