= Leende guldbruna ögon =

Leende guldbruna ögon may refer to:

- "Leende guldbruna ögon", Swedish language-version of the song "Beautiful Brown Eyes"
- Leende guldbruna ögon (TV series), a Swedish TV series
  - Leende guldbruna ögon (soundtrack album), soundtrack for the TV series
