= Simon Lööf =

Swedish actor (born 1996)

- Born: 1996 (age 29–30); Eksjö, Sweden
- Occupation: Actor

Simon Lööf (born 1996) is a Swedish actor and former ice hockey player. He is known for his lead roles in Threesome (2021–2024) and An Honest Life (2025).

== Life and career ==
Lööf is from Eksjö and has a younger sister. After playing ice hockey for Eksjö HC, he moved from Sweden to the United States in 2016. He played in the North American Hockey League with the Lone Star Brahmas before attending the Philadelphia Flyers development camp during the summer of 2017. In an interview with Smålands-Tidningen, Lööf stated he suffered a shoulder injury at the camp, which required surgery and kept him off the ice for about seven months. After playing hockey at Merrimack College, he returned to Sweden in 2018. Shortly after, he received a tryout contract from Kristianstads IK.

In 2020, Lööf made his acting debut in Eagles. After taking a few classes at the Calle Flygare School of Theatre, he and Matilda Källström received the lead roles in Threesome (2021), as a young Swedish couple in London whose seven-year relationship is strained after a spontaneous threesome. The first season premiered on Viaplay in 2021; due to financial issues at the streaming service, the second season did not premiere until 2024 after purchase by SVT Play. He portrayed the author Göran Tunström in the 2024 series So Long, Marianne.

He had a supporting role as Jerais in the fantasy film In the Lost Lands (2025). The same year, he also starred in An Honest Life, a Swedish drama-thriller film directed by Mikael Marcimain and written by Linn Gottfridsson. His performance was praised by Wanda Bendjelloul in a generally mixed review for Dagens Nyheter. He appeared in the series Alla andra kan dra åt helvete in 2025.

== Acting credits ==
=== Film ===
| Year | Title | Role | Notes | Ref. |
|---|---|---|---|---|
| 2025 | In the Lost Lands | Jerais | | |
| 2025 | An Honest Life | Simon | | |

=== Television ===
| Year | Title | Role | Notes | Ref. |
|---|---|---|---|---|
| 2020 | Eagles | | | |
| 2021–2024 | Threesome | David | | |
| 2024 | So Long, Marianne | Göran Tunström | | |
| 2025 | Alla andra kan dra åt helvete | Jonas | | |
