= Otto Fahlgren =

Swedish actor (born 2001)

- Born: 2001 (age 24–25); Skellefteå, Sweden
- Occupation: Actor

Otto Fahlgren (born 2001) is a Swedish actor. He is known for his roles in Beartown (2020), The Riot (2023), and Tystnaden (2025).

== Life and career ==
He was born and raised in Skellefteå, Sweden. He began playing ice hockey in kindgergarten; his experience with the sport in part helped him secure his first acting role as Benji Ovich in the HBO series Beartown (2020), an adaptation of Fredrik Backman's 2016 novel of the same name. He had a lead role in the 2023 Norwegian historical drama film The Riot, based on the 1907 strike at the Sulitjelma Mines. He also played Linus in Tystnaden (2025), a standalone follow-up series to the 2023 series Gaslight.

== Acting credits ==
=== Film ===
Year	Title	Role	Notes	Ref.
2022	Håkan Bråkan			
2023	The Riot	Konrad Nilsson		

=== Television ===
Year	Title	Role	Notes	Ref.
2020	Beartown	Benji Ovich		
2025	Tystnaden	Linus		
