= Hjem =

- Genre: Drama
- Starring: Jannike Kruse; Heidi Ruud Ellingsen; Kaia Varjord
- Country of origin: Norway
- Original language: Norwegian
- No. of seasons: 2
- No. of episodes: 16

Production
- Running time: 45 minutes

Original release
- Network: NRK
- Release: 28 October 2012 – 14 April 2014

Hjem (English: Home) is a Norwegian drama series that aired in 2012 and 2013 on NRK.

Its setting is the village of Vestfossen, where a father admits to his daughter that two other women in Vestfossen are her half-sisters. The three half-sisters are played by Jannike Kruse, Heidi Ruud Ellingsen and Kaia Varjord. The drama focuses on handling of smalltown secrets, and was NRK's next major feelgood drama production after Himmelblå (English: Blue sky).

At the premiere, the series was given a "die throw" (a Norwegian review method where 1 is the lowest score and 6 is the highest) of 4 in Aftenposten and in Bergens Tidende; and 3 in VG and in Dagbladet.
