= Linn Gottfridsson =

Swedish writer (born 1974)

- Born: 1974 (age 51–52); Visby, Sweden
- Education: Dramatiska Institutet
- Occupations: Screenwriter; author
- Children: 2
- Writing career
- Years active: 2002–present

Linn Gottfridsson (born 1974) is a Swedish screenwriter and author of children's literature. She studied at the Dramatiska Institutet, and was awarded the Ingmar Bergman Award in 2001 alongside her classmates. She wrote the scripts for the films Glowing Stars (2009), Comedy Queen (2022), and An Honest Life (2025). With Anders Weidemann and Antonia Pyk, she adapted Fredrik Backman's novel of the same name into the HBO series Beartown (2020). In addition to her screenwriting credits, she also authored a trio of children's books illustrated by Emma Adbåge.

== Early life and education ==
Gottfridsson was born in 1974 in Visby, on the island of Gotland, Sweden, where she also grew up. She has a brother. After graduating from gymnasium, she attended Skurup Folk High School, where she was encouraged to pursue screenwriting. She was one of six students admitted to Dramatiska Institutet's screenwriting programme for the autumn of 1998. She and her classmates were recognised with the Ingmar Bergman Award in 2001. Bergman, who had served as a mentor for the class, wanted to highlight the field of screenwriting. She and Daniel Karlsson collaborated on the script for their graduation project film Viktor och Hans bröder. With direction by Mårten Klingberg, it won Best Film at the Gerasimov Institute of Cinematography's 22nd International VGIK Student Festival. It also won the Guldbagge Award for Best Short Film. Gottfridsson graduated from the Dramatiska Institutet in 2002.

== Career ==
She made her feature film debut as a screenwriter with Glowing Stars (2009), alongside first-time director Lisa Siwe. The film was based on Johanna Thydell's novel, In the Ceiling the Stars Are Shining, which won the August Prize for Children and Young Adult Literature in 2003.

After a career focused on screenwriting, Gottfridsson made her debut as a children's book author in 2016 with En Myras liv (English: An Ant's Life), which was illustrated by Emma Adbåge. In a Dagens Nyheter review, Pia Huss in praised the series for its nuanced depiction of both children and adult characters, and compared it favourably to Barbro Lindgren's early works. A sequel, titled Myran och gåtorna (English: The Ant and the Riddles), was published in 2017. It was listed by Dagens Nyheter critic Lotta Olsson as one of the best books for children aged 6 to 9 of the year. In 2019, Hemliga Myran (English: Secret Ant), the third book in the series was published.

Alongside Anders Weidemann and Antonia Pyk, she adapted Fredrik Backman's novel of the same name into the HBO series Beartown (2020). She also wrote screenplays for Comedy Queen (2022) and the Netflix thriller An Honest Life (2025).

== Personal life ==
Gottfridsson lives in Stockholm with her husband and two children. In 2019, she was one of 250 signatories to a petition urging the Swedish film industry to consider climate change when planning and making media.

== Selected works ==
- Gottfridsson, Linn (2016). En Myras liv [An Ant's Life] (in Swedish). Rabén & Sjögren. ISBN 978-91-29-69693-6.
- — (2017). Myran och gåtorna [The Ant and the Riddles] (in Swedish). Rabén & Sjögren. ISBN 978-91-29-70721-2.
- — (2019). Hemliga Myran [Secret Ant] (in Swedish). Rabén & Sjögren. ISBN 978-91-29-71353-4.
