= The Riot (2023 film) =

2023 Norwegian historical drama film

- Promotional poster
- Norwegian: Sulis 1907
- Directed by: Nils Gaup
- Written by: Christopher Grøndahl
- Produced by: Tom Vidar Karlsen; Trond Eliassen
- Starring: Otto Fahlgren; Simon J. Berger; Alexandra Gjerpen; Heidi Ruud Ellingsen; Stig Henrik Hoff; Rune Temte
- Cinematography: Anders Bohman
- Release date: 6 October 2023
- Running time: 105 minutes
- Country: Norway

The Riot (Norwegian: Sulis 1907) is a 2023 Norwegian historical drama film directed by Nils Gaup and written by Christopher Grøndahl. The film is based on the 1907 strike at the Sulitjelma Mines. It premiered in theaters on 6 October 2023. It won the People's Amanda Award in 2024.

== Plot ==
After his father dies in a mining accident and his mother cannot afford to care for both him and his younger sister, young Konrad Nilsson from Malmberget is sold into slavery at an auction block to a Norwegian farmer. After years of hard labour in Sjønstå only earning room and board, Konrad runs away to seek a paying job at the nearby Sulitjelma Mine, where he is hired as an apprentice. Olof Wenström, who takes over the mining operation after a stay in Michigan, intervenes after an official tries to dismiss him on his 18th birthday as a cost-saving measure. Wenström instead gives him a job in the company's most difficult mine, Hanken, where he meets the men and canteen cook, Svarta Bjorn. The existing workers doubt he can handle the labour and fear he will decrease their wages due to the piece-work system. Konrad begins a strenuous trial job in the mines and receives encouragement from leader Rasmus to keep trying.

Wenström asks Konrad to be his spy, offering an extra half of his salary a week. Konrad, who wants to reunite with his family and move them to America, signs Wenström's contract. Shortly after, the Hanken miners congratulate Konrad on his new permanent position. Wenström wants the men to explode support pillars to extract more ore. The miners reluctantly agree to do so after Wenström threatens to call in strikebreakers if they refuse. Rasmus assigns Konrad to monitor the mine for signs of collapse. Wenström throws the miners a party with free alcohol to celebrate the mine's increased production; Konrad dances with Wenström's maid, Johanna. A man jealously strikes him, starting a brawl. Meanwhile, the executive board fears the legal implications of Wenström's dangerous strategy.

Due to an economic downturn, Wenström cuts wages but assures the men it is temporary. Konrad attends a speech by socialist activist Helene Ugland encouraging the men to rise up. The mine's private security officers banish her and beat a man who speaks up for her. In the aftermath, different mining groups meet, where three camps vote to strike, including Hanken. Wenström accosts Konrad and demands to know details about the strike, which Konrad provides. Wenström preemptively shuts down all the mines. A fight breaks out between miners who support the strike and those who do not, which Wenström interrupts, declaring that the mines will permanently close if the strike does not end immediately. The miners agree. Amongst themselves, they try to figure out how Wenström found out about the strike. Rasmus sends Konrad out on a mission to the farm he used to work at to retrieve Helene. The Hanken mine collapses, and Rasmus is killed trying to account for all the men. The director of safety resigns in protest, weakening Wenström's position with the executives. Johanna overhears part of Wenström's meeting with Konrad and mistakenly thinks Konrad has been negotiating for the miners. They share a kiss. Konrad tells the miners that Wenström will meet their demands so there is no need to retrieve Helene from Sjønstå. Konrad proposes to Johanna.

Wenström institutes a policy where the men must use metal tags to indicate who is in the mine. The miners reject the policy, calling it a slave tag. Konrad speaks up for them, but is struck down by security and Wenström exposes him as an informant. The miners beat him, and Konrad flees. The Hanken miners and their families are rounded up by security forces and imprisoned until their train arrives to evict them. Konrad, who management believes is dead, offers to get Helene to their camp to try to help the miners' cause. Konrad retrieves Helene, and the miners escape and assemble while management is at church. She gives a rousing speech, the miners all uniting to strike. Security forces break up the meeting; Wenström declares the miners killed Konrad but will face murder charges, but Konrad appears and proves him wrong. Conflict breaks out after Wenström fires a warning shot, and a toppled lantern starts a fire. Everyone evacuates the mine as it collapses. Konrad is feared dead; Johanna collapses with grief. Then, from the mine, Konrad emerges, dragging an injured Wenström, whose life he saved. Later, Konrad writes to his mother, saying he is going to pick her and his sister up with his new wife, Johanna. The film closes with real historical pictures of the 1907 strike.

== Cast ==
- Otto Fahlgren as Konrad Nilsson: a Swedish boy sold into child slavery in Norway
- Simon J. Berger as Olof Wenström: new overseer for the mines who seeks to maximise its profits
- Alexandra Gjerpen as Helene Ugland: a socialist activist
- Heidi Ruud Ellingsen as Svarta Bjorn: a canteen cook at Hanken
- Stig Henrik Hoff as Kniv-Axel: a miner at Hanken who shows Konrad the ropes
- Rune Temte as Rasmus Lund: the leader of one of the mining teams
- Pernille Sandøy as Johanna: Olof Wenström's maid

== Production ==
Tomas Evjen began working on the film in 2010. The planned title was Arbeiderkamp (English: Worker's struggle), with Gaup slated to direct. After Evjen's death in 2012, Tom Vidar Karlsen became the project's producer, alongside Trond Eliassen. Filming began on 6 April 2022. Shooting locations included Skjold in Troms, Røros, and Riga, Latvia. The cinematographer was Anders Bohman.

== Release ==
The film had its theatrical premiere on 6 October 2023.

== Reception ==
By October 2023, it had been seen by over 100,000 in theaters, making it the most-watched Norwegian film of the year thus far. The film earned an average rating of 3.0/5 on the Swedish review aggregator site Kritiker. Eva af Geijerstam gave it a generally mixed review in Dagens Nyheter. It won the People's Amanda Award in 2024.
