= Threesome (Swedish TV series) =

Swedish romantic drama television series (2021–2024)

- Directed by: Lisa Linnertorp
- Starring: Matilda Källström; Simon Lööf
- Country of origin: Sweden
- Original languages: Swedish; English
- No. of seasons: 2
- No. of episodes: 16

Original release
- Network: Viaplay; SVT Play
- Release: 29 August 2021 – 3 July 2024

Threesome is a Swedish romantic drama television series. The series was created and directed by Lisa Linnertorp, with writing by both Linnertorp and Elisabeth Marjanović. The series follows Siri (Matilda Källström) and David (Simon Lööf), a Swedish couple in London whose seven-year relationship is tested after a spontaneous, drunken threesome. The first season premiered 29 August 2021 on Viaplay. The series was purchased by SVT Play before the second season premiered 3 July 2024.

== Cast ==
- Matilda Källström as Siri: student of law and international relations; living in London with her boyfriend, David
- Simon Lööf as David: Siri's boyfriend; works in telemarketing
- Lucien Laviscount as John: dancer with The Royal Ballet
- Alma Jodorowsky as Camille: fine arts graduate student from Paris living in London
- Emily Renée as Miriam: Siri's classmate
- Kitt Walker Johansson as Mario: David's telemarketing colleague
- Cat White as Josephine: Siri's classmate

== Episodes ==
Season	Episodes	Originally released
1	8	29 August 2021
2	8	3 July 2024

=== Season 1 (2021) ===
No. overall	No. in season	Title	Directed by	Written by	Original release date
1	1	"The Threesome"	Lisa Linnertorp	Lisa Linnertorp, Elisabeth Marjanović, Martin Bengtsson	29 August 2021
Siri and David, a Swedish couple living in London, are interrupted having sex by their landlord, who has come to check out a problem with their plaster. After initially opting to stay in and study, Siri joins David and their friend Mario at a bar. They meet Camille, a French graduate student, who invites them to join her friends, and then out to a club and an after party. Siri and Camille go out for a smoke; Siri reveals she and David have been together for seven years. Siri and Camille get more intoxicated, while David wants to go home. After complimenting the way David and Siri kiss, Camille and Siri begin to kiss too, leading to a threesome.
2	2	"Aftermath"	Lisa Linnertorp	Lisa Linnertorp, Elisabeth Marjanović	29 August 2021
Siri wakes up beside David spooning Camille. They quietly get dressed and leave with Mario. Back at their apartment, Mario plots a pick-up line for Camille. Siri is standoffish; David wants to know if she is okay and she says she is. During a study group, she leaves and anxiously scrolls through Camille’s Instagram. Siri’s classmates Miriam and Josephine discuss their sex lives and notice an attractive ballet dancer on a dating app. Siri returns home to David and Mario still playing video games. They clean and go to bed. After David promises not to tell anyone about the threesome, Siri initiates sex, where she wants David to validate that she is more attractive than Camille and loves here. David falls asleep after, but Siri cannot.
3	3	"Kentucky Lemonade"	Lisa Linnertorp	Lisa Linnertorp, Elisabeth Marjanović	29 August 2021
Siri FaceTimes David, who is visiting family in Sweden while Siri stays in London for an exam. Searching the internet for advice, Siri views threesome porn and then tries to get in touch with David, who is at a party back home. She goes out with Miriam and Josephine, still trying to get a reply from David. Siri gets heavily intoxicated before David gets in touch. She confesses to regretting the threesome. David does not want to talk about it over the phone at a party, angering Siri. She makes a new Instagram account and sends a flirty message to the attractive ballet dancer, John. They begin chatting. The next morning, Siri picks David up at Heathrow and they finally have a real discussion about the threesome.
4	4	"Bar Therapy"	Lisa Linnertorp	Lisa Linnertorp, Elisabeth Marjanović	29 August 2021
After an important exam, Siri goes out to celebrate. After her boyfriend heads home early and learning Miriam went on a date with John, Siri arranges to get a drink with John that night. She introduces herself as “Camille” and admits for the first time to being dissatisfied with her degree programme. They go dancing, get food. They both open up to each other; Siri shares her snus with him. They exchange phone numbers before parting ways. Siri returns home to David.
5	5	"My Name Is Siri"	Lisa Linnertorp	Lisa Linnertorp, Elisabeth Marjanović	29 August 2021
Distracted looking up information about John, Siri misses her bus stop and is late to a planned real estate meeting with David; they are looking for a new apartment. They argue about Siri’s lateness; David is annoyed since she wanted the meeting to begin with. David is fine with their current (slightly run-down) apartment; Siri wants a nicer place even if it costs a lot. Siri asks about Camille. It devolves into an argument about the threesome. Siri leaves furious after David claims he thought he was spooning Siri the morning after. She visits John at his ballet studio; they head back to his apartment where Siri confesses to being in a relationship. They have sex, and afterwards she tells him her real name. She calls David to say she stayed at Miriam's and is coming home.
6	6	"The Beauty and the Shittyness of Love"	Lisa Linnertorp	Lisa Linnertorp, Elisabeth Marjanović	29 August 2021
Siri and David playfully argue at the laundromat. David finds John’s cigarette lighter; Siri says it is Miriam’s. David offers to finish it so she can go study, but she instead goes to see John. John asks about her relationship; Siri says she loves David but they are in different places in life. Siri asks if John is seeing anyone else. After he confesses his fears, she comforts him. He takes her to a ballet performance. They go out after with John’s friends. On her way back to David, she runs into Camille who invites her to an upcoming house party.
7	7	"Happy Anniversary"	Lisa Linnertorp	Lisa Linnertorp, Elisabeth Marjanović	29 August 2021
Siri sexts with John before leaving for her anniversary trip with David. He planned romantic gestures including flowers and a personalised book about their relationship. Over room service, Siri and David discuss their future as a couple. Siri gets overwhelmed during sex; she shares her anxieties about their relationship and wonders aloud if the threesome happened because they both want something different out of life. David leaves her at the hotel; Siri tries to get in touch with him as she heads back to their apartment. She leaves tearful voicemails for him begging him to come home. He eventually does, and asks her if she has slept with anyone else. She lies and says she has not. He is emotional and wants to know how long she has felt disconnected from him. She blames their relationship issue on the threesome. He says he felt dirty having sex with someone else because he loves her so much. They cry and hold each other. Siri messages John to say their dalliance is over.
8	8	"I love him"	Lisa Linnertorp	Lisa Linnertorp, Elisabeth Marjanović	29 August 2021
David and Siri fix the plaster problem themselves. Camille texts Siri to remind her about the party invitation. David does not want to attend, but Siri does, conveying it will prove that their relationship has stayed solid despite the threesome. At a pregame with Mario and Miriam, they play never have I ever, where they discuss group sex. Siri sees John at Camille’s party and hides in the bathroom. Siri says she feel sick and David offers to leave with her. Miriam “introduces” John to Siri and David. Dodging invitations to the rooftop, Siri and David go outside to head home. Siri goes back inside and speaks to John, who is hurt by her suddenly ending things between them. Their taxi arrives; David tries to get a hold of Siri, who is making out with John in the bathroom. David, who has Siri’s phone, sees a romantic good-bye text from John. Siri joins David in the taxi.

=== Season 2 (2024) ===
No. overall	No. in season	Title	Directed by	Written by	Original release date
9	1	"Fråga Siri"	Lisa Linnertorp	Lisa Linnertorp, Elisabeth Marjanovic Cronvall	3 July 2024
David has just learned that Siri has been unfaithful with John but does not know how to confront her. Instead, David arranges to meet John to hear what happened from him.
10	2	"Du kollade mig i ögonen och du svor"	Lisa Linnertorp	Lisa Linnertorp, Elisabeth Marjanovic Cronvall	
David confronts Siri about her infidelity with John and demands answers. Siri tells David what happened. David decides to move in with Mario.
11	3	"Men kanske en öl"	Lisa Linnertorp	Lisa Linnertorp, Elisabeth Marjanovic Cronvall	
David returns to work and learns that Siri has been looking for him there. Mario takes David out for a night of drinking. The night ends with David's colleague Emma accompanying him home.
12	4	"Bara krama dig"	Lisa Linnertorp	Lisa Linnertorp, Elisabeth Marjanovic Cronvall	
David and Siri try to have an honest talk. Still, David is not ready to forgive Siri. Later, David and Mario go drinking, after which David ends up at Siri's home.
13	5	"Jag tror jag behöver tid"	Lisa Linnertorp	Lisa Linnertorp, Elisabeth Marjanovic Cronvall	17 July 2024
David wakes up at Siri's home and she asks him to go to the emergency department to have his wound examined. While waiting to be examined, David has an unexpected encounter with Joanna.
14	6	"Man kan inte ändra nån annan"	Lisa Linnertorp	Lisa Linnertorp, Elisabeth Marjanovic Cronvall	
David tries to distance himself from Siri. He grows closer to Mario and Joanna, but Siri unexpectedly reappears in his life.
15	7	"Ett nybörjarmisstag"	Lisa Linnertorp	Lisa Linnertorp, Elisabeth Marjanovic Cronvall	24 July 2024
David's meeting with Siri makes him realize that he is at a crossroads to choose between his new and old life.
16	8	"Min närmaste i detta livet"	Lisa Linnertorp	Lisa Linnertorp, Elisabeth Marjanovic Cronvall	24 July 2024
After meeting their old group of friends, David goes home with Siri. Siri wants answers, and David realizes that he must make a decision about how to move forward.

== Release ==
The first season premiered on Viaplay on 29 August 2021. In May 2022, it was announced that the series had been renewed for a second season. Promotional stills for the second season were released in April 2023, with the season to be released that autumn. However, due to financial problems at Viaplay, the second season's streaming release was delayed until the series was picked up by SVT Play in 2024.

== Reception ==
On the Swedish review aggregator website Kritiker, the series' first season earned an average rating of 4.4/5 based on 6 critics' reviews. The second season received an average rating of 4.4/5 based on 5 critics' reviews.
