= Svarta Bjorn =

Norwegian railroad cook (1878–1901)

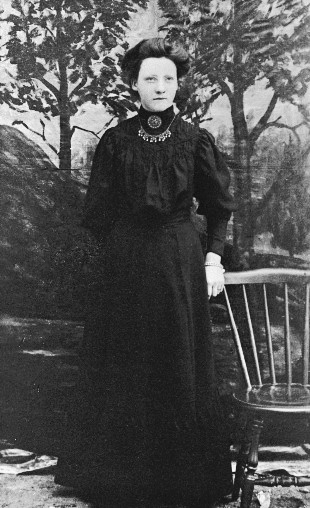
Svarta Bjorn

Anna Rebecka Hofstad (7 April 1878 in Offersøya, Norway – 12 October 1901 in Tornehamn, Sweden) was a Norwegian cook. She was known in history as Svarta Bjorn (lit. 'Black Bear'), Svarta Bjørn (Norwegian), and Svarta Björn (Swedish). She was active as a canteen cook for the railway navvies (workers) during the construction of the Iron Ore Line between Kiruna and Narvik in 1899–1901. She has been treated as a local legend in the history of the area and became the object of fiction.

She has been described as tall, dark, beautiful and intelligent. Her fame may be due to being one of the few women in the area, making her an icon among the railway workers. According to legend, she died during a fight with another railway cook, who broke her ribs and gave her a fatal blow to the head. She was taken to the infirmary in Tornehamn, where she died. At the time of her death, she was also to have suffered from tuberculosis, which may also have contributed to her death. She was buried in the Tornehamn Navvy workers cemetery. The white cross on her grave does not mention her entire name, but only names her as "Anna".

In 1979, a Swedish film was made about her: Legenden om Svarta Björn (The Legend of Svarta Björn) by Ingvar Skogsberg.

She was portrayed by Heidi Ruud Ellingsen in The Riot, a 2023 historical drama based on the 1907 strike at the Sulitjelma Mines.
