= Charlotta Jonsson =

Swedish actress (born 1973)

Charlotta Jonsson (born 1973) is a Swedish actress. She is from Umeå in northern Sweden but now lives in Stockholm.

Between 2000 and 2004, Jonsson studied at the Gothenburg Theatre Academy. She is best known for her role as Charlotte Ekebladh in the 1999–2001 TV series Sjätte dagen (in English The Sixth Day) and as Linda Wallander in the 2013 film series Wallander about life of Kurt Wallander.

== Filmography ==
TV series

- 1999–2001 - Sjätte dagen
- 1999 - Skilda världar
- 2001 - En ängels tålamod
- 2003 - Utan dig
- 2007 - Saltön
- 2008 - Höök
- 2010 - Den fördömde (aka Sebastian Bergman)
- 2010 - Solsidan
- 2011 - Bibliotekstjuven

Wallander series (2013)

  - "Den orolige mannen"
  - "Försvunnen"
  - "Saknaden"
  - "Sveket"
  - "Mordbrännaren"
  - "Sorgfågeln"
- 2020 - Beartown

Voice

- 2008 - Ponyo på klippan vid havet (voice on Swedish version)

Others

- 2009 - Oskuld
- 2011 - Juni
- 2011 - The Sexual Monologues
