= Heidi Ruud Ellingsen =

Norwegian actress (born 1985)

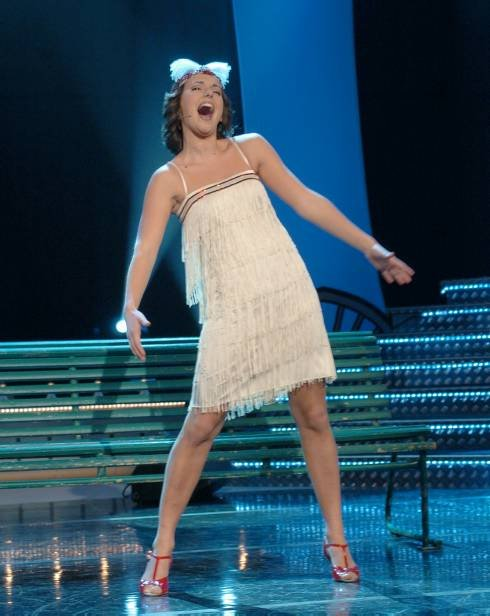
Ellingsen performing in the finale of Drømmerollen (2007). Photo: Jan Erik Teigen/Fremover

Heidi Ruud Ellingsen (born 26 July 1985) is a Norwegian musical theatre performer, actress and singer. She is known for leading roles in stage productions and for appearances in television and film.

She gained wider attention in 2007 after winning the NRK1 television competition Drømmerollen, which led to her casting as Kathy Selden in Singin' in the Rain at Oslo Nye Teater.

== Early life and education ==
Ellingsen grew up in Narvik. During her youth she attended Narvik kulturskole, the municipal school of music and performing arts, where she studied dance, singing and violin. She participated in several stage productions during this period.

She later studied musical theatre at Bårdar Akademiet in Oslo from 2004 to 2006.

== Career ==
=== Breakthrough ===
In 2006, Ellingsen made her professional stage debut in Fiddler on the Roof at Oslo Nye Teater. The following year she competed in the televised talent competition Drømmerollen on NRK1 and won the title role in Singin' in the Rain. The production premiered at Oslo Nye Teater in January 2008.

=== Stage career ===
Following her breakthrough, she appeared in several Norwegian musical and theatre productions. She played the title role in Sol av Isfolket, based on Margit Sandemo’s The Legend of the Ice People, and later appeared as Cosette in Les Misérables and in Spring Awakening.

From 2010 to 2015, she was a member of the ensemble at Det Norske Teatret, where she performed in several productions, including The Secret Garden (Den hemmelege hagen), Enron, Tonje Glimmerdal, and Fiddler on the Roof.

She has played leading roles in productions such as:

- Mary Poppins at Folketeatret (2015)
- Flashdance at Chateau Neuf (2018)
- Moulin Rouge! at Chateau Neuf (2023)

She has also performed as Solveig in Peer Gynt at Gålå and appeared in several large-scale outdoor historical productions.

=== Film and television ===
Ellingsen played Oda in the NRK drama series Hjem (2012). She also appeared in the Swedish-American television series 100 Code (2015).

In 2019, she co-hosted Melodi Grand Prix 2019 on NRK1 alongside Kåre Magnus Bergh.

In 2023, she portrayed Svarta Bjørn in the historical drama film Sulis 1907. The same year, she appeared in the film Konvoi, for which she was nominated for the Amanda Award for Best Supporting Actress in 2024.

=== Voice acting ===
Ellingsen has also worked as a voice actor, including roles in the Norwegian-language versions of animated films such as Ice Age: Continental Drift.

== Personal life ==
Ellingsen's partner is the actor Mads Ousdal. They have two children, the elder born in 2016.

== Awards and nominations ==
- 2015 – Musical Theatre Prize (Musikkteaterprisen)
- 2018 – Musical Theatre Prize (Musikkteaterprisen)
- 2008 – Narvik Municipal Culture Prize
- 2024 – Nominated for the Amanda Award for Best Supporting Actress for Konvoi
