= Leende guldbruna ögon (TV series) =

- Genre: drama, comedy
- Created by: Anna Hylander; Emiliano Goessens; Anders Weidemann
- Directed by: Anna Hylander, Emiliano Goessens
- Country of origin: Sweden
- Original language: Swedish
- No. of seasons: 1
- No. of episodes: 3

Original release
- Network: SVT1
- Release: 26 February – 12 March 2007

Leende guldbruna ögon is a Swedish television miniseries, originally airing over SVT1 for three Monday evenings in a row between 26 February-12 March 2007 (with reruns airing in November 2008) It was directed by Anna Hylander and Emiliano Goessens with screenplay by Anders Weidemann. The series has an anti-racism dansband theme, and features a lot of dansband music. Even Christer Sjögren and Tomas Ledin appear, playing themselves. On 26 February 2007, the soundtrack album was released.

The series was partly recorded in Rågsved in southern Stockholm.

== Plot ==
23 years old Lennart Johansson from Fellingsbro has dark skin, and wants to become a dansband star. His favourite singer is Christer Sjögren. He wants to sing for the dansband Sven Bodins, but is rejected due to his skin colour. Sven Bodins state there is too much racial prejudice within the dansband community, even if they declare themselves not having anything against people with dark skin. This leads to Lennart Johansson deciding to start an own band.
