= Hypnosis (disambiguation) =

Hypnosis is a state of enhanced capacity to respond to suggestion.

Hypnosis may also refer to:

- Hypnosis (1920 film) (Hypnose: Sklaven fremden Willens), a 1920 German silent film
- Hypnosis (2020 film), a 2020 Russian-Finnish drama film
- The Hypnosis (film), a 2023 Swedish film
- "Hypnosis" (Ive song), a 2023 song by Ive
- "Hypnosis" (Taemin song), a 2017 song by Taemin

== See also ==
- Hypnotize (disambiguation)
- Hypnotized (disambiguation)
- Hypnotist (disambiguation)
