= Kaia Varjord =

Norwegian actress (born 1978)

- Born: 7 July 1978
- Awards: (90 Minutes, Amanda Award 2013, 2013)

Kaia Varjord (born 7 July 1978) is a Norwegian actress.

She was born in Drøbak, but grew up in Hølen and attended the Nordic Institute of Stage and Studio and Norwegian National Academy of Theatre. She was originally a stage actress; her first television series was Fremtiden kommer bakfra.

She played Karianne in the 2012 film 90 Minutes, a film about domestic violence. Aksel Hennie's character Trond subjects Karianne to violence in a 30-minute segment. The film earned her a 2013 Amanda Award as Newcomer of the Year. She went straight from 90 Minutes to starring in the feelgood TV series Hjem, having also starred in the series Hvaler.
