= Hypnotized (disambiguation) =

Hypnotized (American English) or hypnotised (British English) is the state of being under hypnosis.

Hypnotized or Hypnotised may also refer to:

== Film ==
- Hypnotized (1910 film), a 1910 American silent short drama film
- Hypnotized (1932 film), a 1932 American comedy film

== Music ==
- Hypnotised (album), a 1980 album by the Undertones

=== Songs ===
- "Hypnotized" (Anyma and Ellie Goulding song), 2025
- "Hypnotised" (Coldplay song), 2017
- "Hypnotized" (Sophie Ellis-Bextor song), 2022
- "Hypnotized" (Fleetwood Mac song), 1973
- "Hypnotized" (Tory Lanez song), 2018
- "Hypnotized" (Plies song), 2007
- "Hypnotized" (Purple Disco Machine and Sophie and the Giants song), 2021
- "Hypnotized" (Rihanna song), 2006
- "Hypnotized" (Shanadoo song), 2007
- "Hypnotised" (Simple Minds song), 1995
- "Hypnotized" (Spacemen 3 song), 1989
- "Hypnotized" (Mark Stewart song), 1985
- "Hypnotised" (Years & Years song), 2018
- "Hypnotised", a song by 2 Unlimited from the 1994 album Real Things
- "Hypnotised", a song by Aberfeldy from the 2006 album Do Whatever Turns You On
- "Hypnotised", a song by Cabaret Voltaire from the 1990 album Groovy, Laidback and Nasty
- "Hypnotised", a song by Rüfüs from the 2016 Bloom
- "Hypnotised", a song by Split Enz from the 2007 album Rootin Tootin Luton Tapes
- "Hypnotized", a song by Blind Melon from the 2008 album For My Friends
- "Hypnotized", a 1957 song by the Drifters
- "Hypnotized", a 1967 song by Linda Jones

== See also ==
- Hypnotize (disambiguation)
- Hypnotist (disambiguation)
- Hypnosis (disambiguation)
