= Hypnotize (disambiguation) =

Hypnotize or hypnotise may refer to:

- Hypnosis, a state of enhanced capacity to respond to suggestion
- Hypnotize (album), a 2005 album by System of a Down
  - "Hypnotize" (System of a Down song), the title track of the above album
- "Hypnotize" (The Notorious B.I.G. song), a song by the Notorious B.I.G., from the 1997 album Life After Death
- "Hypnotize" (Scritti Politti song), a song by Scritti Politti, from the 1985 album Cupid & Psyche '85
- "Hypnotize", a song by Audioslave, from the 2002 album Audioslave
- "Hypnotize", a song by the White Stripes, from the 2003 album Elephant
- "Hypnotize", a song by soulDecision, from the 2004 album Shady Satin Drug
- "Hypnotise", a song by Way Out West, from the 2001 album Intensify
- "Hypnotize", a song by XG, from the 2026 album The Core - 核

== See also ==
- Hypnotized (disambiguation)
- Hypnotist (disambiguation)
- Hypnosis (disambiguation)
