= Tobias Zilliacus =

Swedish-speaking Finnish actor (born 1971)

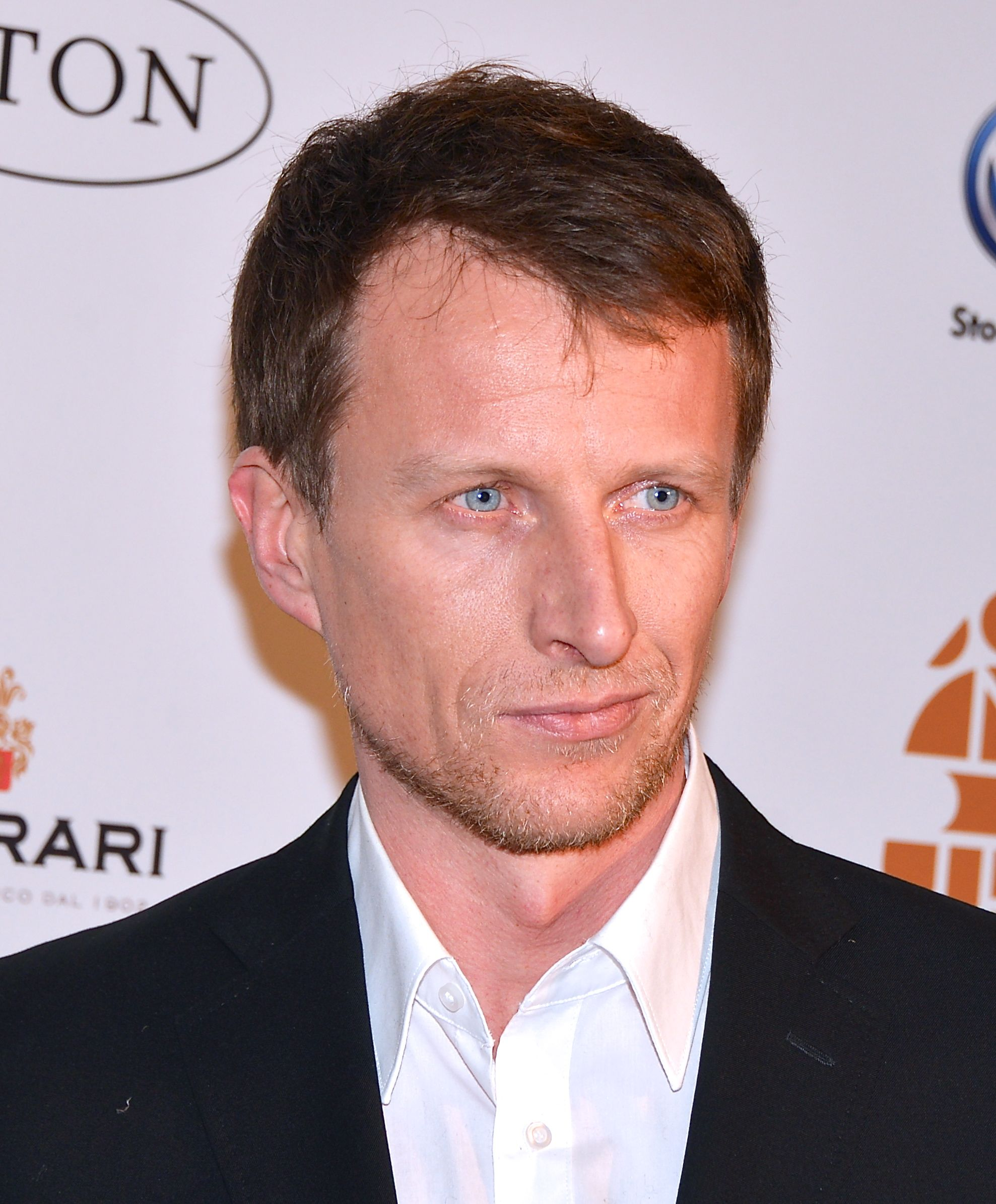
- Zilliacus in 2013
- Born: 30 September 1971 (age 54); Helsinki, Finland
- Occupation: Actor
- Years active: 1995–present
- Spouse: Linda Zilliacus

Tobias Zilliacus (born 30 September 1971) is a Swedish-speaking Finnish actor. He is best known of his role in the 2012 Swedish crime film The Hypnotist. In 2015, Zilliacus appeared in British TV series Fortitude.

== Early life ==
Zilliacus was born on 30 September 1971 in Helsinki. He grew up in Hanko.

== Career ==
He had a major role in the 2003 Finnish series Operation Stella Polaris, based on the historical events of the same name.

He played Harry Järv in Beyond the Front Line (2004).

His role as Joona Linna in The Hypnotist was announced in 2011.

In 2020, he appeared on stage in the play Morfars Mauser at the Lilla Teatern and as Mats Erdahl in HBO Nordic's Beartown.

He played Kari-Pekka Kyrö in Lahti 2001, a 2023 series about the 2001 FIS Nordic World Skiing Championship's doping scandal.

He was featured in the cast of Stormskerry Maja, a 2024 Swedish-language Finnish historical drama.

== Personal life ==
He and his wife Linda have three children.

== Filmography ==
Year	Film	Role
2003	Nousukausi	Tuomas
2003	Operation Stella Polaris	Mikael Bergman
2004	Beyond the Front Line	Harry Järv
2004	Kukkia ja sidontaa	Elis Makkonen
2006	Onni von Sopanen	Josku's father
2009	One Foot Under	Visa
2011	Iris	Elias
2012	The Hypnotist	Joona Linna
2020	Beartown	Mats Erdahl
2021	Oslo	Jan Egeland
2023	Lahti 2001	Kari-Pekka Kyrö
2024	Stormskerry Maja	Mickel, Maja's father
