= Anders Weidemann =

Swedish screenwriter (born 1971)

- Born: 13 January 1971 (age 55) Mölndal, Sweden
- Occupation: Screenwriter; producer
- Children: 2

Anders Weidemann (born 13 January 1971) is a Swedish screenwriter and producer.

== Life and career ==
He was born on 13 January 1971 in Mölndal, Sweden. He wrote the interactive television series The Truth About Marika, which was nominated in 2008 for Prix Europa in two categories: TV Fiction and Emerging Media. He wrote the 2017 film Monky. He was the screenwriter for 30 Degrees in February, a SVT series that won Best TV Drama at Kristallen 2013. He co-created the crime series Interrogation (2020). Göteborgs-Posten reported that he was the first Swede to serve as showrunner for an American television series. Alongside Linn Gottfridsson and Antonia Pyk, he adapted Fredrik Backman's novel of the same name into the HBO series Beartown (2020). He and his wife Sofie have two children.
