= Land of Sin (TV series) =

2026 Swedish crime drama television series

- Swedish: Synden
- Created by: Peter Grönlund
- Starring: Krista Kosonen; Mohammed Nour Oklah
- Composer: Johan Testad
- Country of origin: Sweden
- Original language: Swedish

Original release
- Network: Netflix
- Release: 2 January 2026

Land of Sin (Swedish: Synden, lit. 'The sin') is a five-episode 2026 Swedish crime drama series created, written, and directed by Peter Grönlund. It stars Krista Kosonen and Mohammed Nour Oklah as detectives from Malmö investigating the murder of a local teenager from a rural community in the Bjäre Peninsula of Scania. The series premiered 2 January 2026 on Netflix.

== Cast ==
- Krista Kosonen as Dani Anttila: detective in Malmö
- Mohammed Nour Oklah as Malik: relatively new detective in Malmö; married father of three
- Peter Gantman as Elis Duncke: Ivar's brother; pig farmer
- Cesar Matijasevic as Oliver Anttila: Dani's son with substance abuse issues
- Alexander Persson as Silas Duncke
- Lisa Lindgren as Kätty: Elis' wife
- William Jannert as Jon: Elis and Kätty's son; aspiring university student
- Harry Westerlund as Harald Duncke: Elis and Kätty's son; mentally disabled
- Wilmer Rosén as Kimmen: Ivar and Boel's son; Silas' younger brother
- Ywonne Trejling as Boel: Ivar's wife
- Mats Mårtensson as Ivar Duncke: Silas' sickly father
- Jacqueline Wingh as Vera: Ivar and Boel's daughter; Silas' sister
- Jenna Chaaroui as Nathalie
- Jesper Lirbank as Kniv-Ola
- Ken Hansen as Jan-Olof
- Michael Sandberg as Kåre Lönn: manslaughter convict and small-time criminal working for Järven's drug operation
- Love Linder as René: youth detention centre worker
- Latife Akbas-Pihl as Becka: Silas' ex-girlfriend
- Patrik Andersson as Vakt
- Anette Akbas Pihl as Boel's sister
- Michel Perche as Michel
- Petri Junninen as Petri
- Jonny Nilsson as Jonny
- Kicki Önnerfjord as Kicki
- Anette Lykkegaard as Kätty's cousin
- Peter Magnusson as Cennerbäck: Dani and Malik's police supervisor
- Tom Fransson as Rogenmo

== Episodes ==
No.	Title	Directed by	Written by	Original release date
1	"You've Been Warned"	Peter Grönlund	Peter Grönlund	2 January 2025
The episode opens with a flashforward to Dani lying hurt on the floor of a warehouse. One week earlier, she receives a call from Ivar saying his son Silas (Dani's former foster child) has gone missing. Ivar does not want to involve police but insists she owes him. At home, Dani fails to persuade her son Oliver to seek help for his addiction. She is partnered with Malik, a novice officer, whom she dismisses as a rookie. Dani and Malik clash while pursuing a suspect; Malik wants to follow all regulations whereas Dani does not. They travel to the Bjäre Peninsula in Scania. Silas' brother reveals his computer password, Nathalie, leading Dani to discover he booked two one-way ferry tickets. Ivar, hospitalised, suspects a blacksmith, Silas’s mentor. The detectives have a tense confrontation with armed locals. Silas’s body is found in a river. Forensics reveal he was forcibly drowned in the ocean. Elis' wife Kätty reports Silas' ex-girlfriend Becka threatened him. Hearing Silas was blackmailing the blacksmith, the detectives find him also dead. Ivar's brother Elis demands the case be handled by the community instead of outsiders like police, giving Dani one week.
2	"Unidentified Man #1"	Peter Grönlund	Peter Grönlund	2 January 2025
In a flashback, Dani learns that Silas and Oliver were caught shoplifting together, both testing positive for drugs. In the present, brothers Elis and Ivar take their families to identify Silas' body, where a suspicious carved geometric mark is noted on his arm. A witness reports seeing Silas and an unknown man acting suspiciously by the ocean, leading the detectives to suspect this as the murder scene. A police meeting concludes the blacksmith likely killed himself. Dani informs Oliver that Silas is dead. Boel angrily confronts Elis about the will. Dani learns that Elis and Ivar's families are feuding over a disputed tract of land known as Synden. Phone records lead the detectives to a youth detention facility in Ängelholm, where Dani meets a young woman, Nathalie, bearing the same geometric mark on her arm. Dani orders surveillance on her, while Malik grows suspicious of youth worker René. Footage shows Nathalie meeting local criminal Kåre. The detectives confront Nathalie and learn Silas possessed videos of the blacksmith with underage boys and was blackmailing him to settle a debt to Kåre. Tracking Kåre to Malmö, the detectives figure he is searching for Silas' accomplice, who turns out to be Oliver.
3	"Brothers"	Peter Grönlund	Peter Grönlund	2 January 2025
Elis reveals he never wanted to inherit the family farm and supports his son's university ambitions over following in his footsteps. Ivar's son Kimmen informs Elis that Silas snitched on Järven, suggesting the police should focus their search on him. Malik tracks down Dani, revealing Oliver’s DNA was found under Silas' fingernails. They discuss fatherhood; Dani reveals Oliver’s father left early on whereas Malik is a married father of three. Dani defends Oliver’s character despite his use of benzos, but when she eventually confronts him. Malik arrests Oliver for Silas' murder and Robban takes Dani off the case, placing her on leave. A rehab place for Oliver is offered too late, as he is already in jail. Meanwhile, an officer locates Becka and brings her in for questioning. Becka informs investigators that Silas worked for a man with a Glasgow smile, and that Kåre was just an underling. Following Ivar’s death, Kätty and Elis argue over a deathbed promise concerning Järven. Dani follows Elis to Järven's illegal amphetamine lab but is knocked unconscious. Järven's gang intends to kill her, throwing her into an open pit, while Elis is held at gunpoint under suspicion of leading the police to the warehouse.
4	"Järven"	Peter Grönlund	Peter Grönlund	2 January 2025
Järven arrives and is furious with Elis for leading police to them. Elis asks for a job and volunteers his warehouse to convince them to spare his life. He later retrieves an injured Dani from the pit and tends to her wounds. He wants to help her find who killed Silas, stating they both know Oliver did not. He also seems to blame Dani for repeatedly trying to get social services involved with Silas’ parents. Now in solitary confinement, Oliver recalls fighting with Silas. Dani learns the seemingly worthless land Elis fought Ivar over is actually worth a lot because of agricultural grants. Dani confronts Kätty with the fact that Elis’ family has been profiting from Synden. Malik receives the transcript of Oliver’s police interview; Dani is informed Oliver essentially confessed to killing Silas. Kätty tells nervous townspeople about Dani’s line of questioning; they discuss getting rid of her. A group of kids find a burn barrel with some of Silas’ belongings. While checking her phone, Dani crashes her car with a vehicle behind her in pursuit.
5	"Queen Bee"	Peter Grönlund	Peter Grönlund	3 January 2025
In a flashback, Ivar gives his son Kimmen a gun. In the present, Malik tracks Dani’s phone to a crash site where she expresses fear that her son, Oliver, murdered Silas. Seeking to clear Oliver, Malik and Dani question René and Nathalie. Nathalie reveals that Silas and Oliver were heavily indebted to Kåre and "Järven" (Lennie Kroogh) over drug money. While Dani attempts to keep Järven alive to exonerate her son, Elis seeks his own revenge against him. The investigation shifts when Malik links a truck at the crime scene to Harald. Dani confronts Elis’ family, where Kätty claims Harald killed Silas for insulting him and that she helped dispose of the body. After Elis knocks Dani unconscious, a flashback reveals the truth: Kätty actually directed Jon to "handle" Silas because of the land dispute. As a mob approaches Kätty alone in her house, Kimmen confronts Elis, Harald, and Jon in the woods with his gun. With Malik and Dani in pursuit, Elis falsely confesses to the murder to protect his son. Kimmen shoots him. The scene is overtaken by police. In the aftermath, the charges against Oliver are dropped. Dani picks him up from prison and embraces him.

== Release ==
The series premiered 2 January 2026 on Netflix.

== Reception ==
Camilla Larsson of Sydsvenskan noted that the series represents a return to Peter Grönlund’s established thematic territory, and highlighted his ability to depict "crime, class and exclusion" through a "sociopolitical slant." Writing for Svenska Dagbladet, Jan Söderqvist praised the series for its lack of simple answers to complex moral questions regarding parenthood and original sin. In contrast, Karolina Fjellborg of Aftonbladet felt the series was not Grönlund's best work, as she found the core crime mystery uneven and some characters overly generic, but added that the "tragic, intense resolution" was "worth waiting for." The technical craft was also a point of praise, with Larsson commending Mattias Rudh's cinematography.

The performances, particularly the combination of professional actors and amateur newcomers, received critical praise. Larsson said the series was "incredibly well-cast", calling Krista Kosonen’s portrayal of the "tough but dishevelled" investigator Dani a "knockout." Söderqvist characterised the interaction between amateur performers with the professionals as seamless. Both Larsson and Fjellborg singled out newcomer Peter Gantman for his performance as the patriarch Elis; Fjellborg described Gantman, a truck driver with no previous acting experience, as "magnetic" and the "real star" of the series.
