= The Hypnotist (2012 film) =

2012 film

- Film poster
- Directed by: Lasse Hallström
- Screenplay by: Paolo Vacirca
- Based on: Hypnotisören by Lars Kepler
- Produced by: Börje Hansson; Peter Possne; Bertil Olsson
- Starring: Tobias Zilliacus; Mikael Persbrandt; Lena Olin
- Cinematography: Mattias Montero
- Edited by: Sebastian Amundsen; Thomas Täng
- Release date: 28 September 2012
- Running time: 122 minutes
- Country: Sweden
- Language: Swedish

The Hypnotist (Swedish: Hypnotisören) is a 2012 Swedish crime thriller film directed by Lasse Hallström, based on the Swedish novel of the same name by Lars Kepler. The film was selected as the Swedish entry for the Best Foreign Language Oscar at the 85th Academy Awards, but it did not make the final shortlist.

== Plot ==
To apprehend a killer who has executed a whole family except for sole survivor Josef, Detective Joona seeks help from Dr. Erik, a specialist in acute trauma and hypnotism, to obtain case details from Josef, who is comatose. Erik is an insomniac, who takes heavy sleeping pills and has marital troubles. Although he is suspended from practice, he tries to help but pulls back after seeing discomfort in Josef.

Later Erik's son Benjamin is kidnapped by someone who drugged both his wife and son, leaving threatening notes behind for Erik to stop hypnotizing. In search of his son, Erik hypnotizes Josef and discovers that he was the killer and acted under the influence and instructions of his birth mother. By way of hypnotizing his wife, Erik then figures out that Josef's mother is Lydia, a nurse who looked after him at the hospital.

Joona learns she is mentally unstable and that she is Benjamin's kidnapper, and later uncovers the location of the house where she is staying with Benjamin. They go there to retrieve him and arrest Lydia. Lydia, who thinks Benjamin is her son Josef and the policemen have come to take away her child, fires her weapon and tries to escape with Benjamin in her school bus. In panic she drives her van onto thin ice over a frozen lake. Joona manages to save Benjamin, but Lydia drowns. On Christmas Day, Erik and his family eat out happily and Joona visits his female partner at home.

== Cast ==
- Tobias Zilliacus as Joona Linna
- Mikael Persbrandt as Erik Maria Bark
- Lena Olin as Simone Bark
- Helena af Sandeberg as Daniella
- Jonatan Bökman as Josef
- Oscar Pettersson as Benjamin
- Eva Melander as Magdalena
- Anna Azcarate as Lydia
- Johan Hallström as Erland
- Göran Thorell as Stensund

== See also ==
- List of submissions to the 85th Academy Awards for Best Foreign Language Film
- List of Swedish submissions for the Academy Award for Best Foreign Language Film
