= Peter Grönlund =

Swedish filmmaker (born 1977)

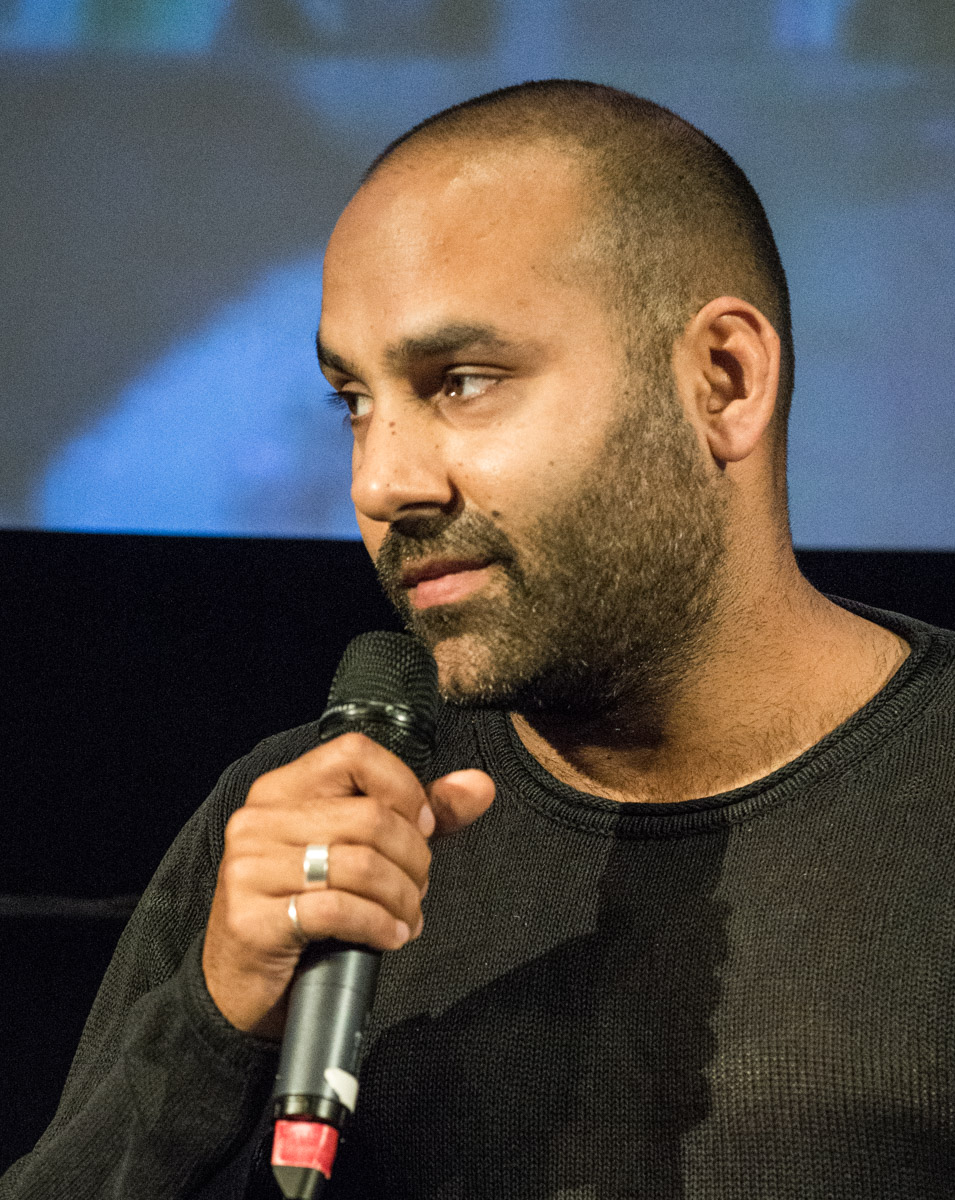
- Born: 1 September 1977 (age 48); Tehran, Iran
- Occupations: Director; screenwriter
- Awards: Guldbagge Award for Best Screenplay (2016, 2018)

Peter Grönlund (born 1 September 1977) is a Swedish director and screenwriter. For each of his first two feature films, Drifters (2015) and Goliath (2018), he won Guldbagge Awards for Best Screenplay. He is also known for directing the HBO series Beartown (2020) and the Netflix original crime drama Land of Sin (2026).

== Biography ==
He was born on 1 September 1977 in Tehran, Iran. He was adopted by Swedish parents and grew up in Bromma.

Grönlund made his directorial debut in 2009 with the short film Jonny Heiskanen, followed by another short film Bröderna Jaukka in 2010.

He made his feature film debut directing and writing Drifters (2015), for which he won a Guldbagge Award for Best Screenplay.

He won a second Guldbagge for his second feature film, Goliath (2018).

In January 2019, it was announced that Grönlund would be directing Beartown, a television adaptation of Fredrik Backman's 2016 novel of the same name. The first two episodes premiered in Europe on 18 October 2020, with the remaining three being released weekly afterwards. It had a North American release on Max the following year. The series received positive reviews from critics. Grönlund's direction was highlighted by Karolina Fjellborg in Aftonbladet, Jacob Lundström in Dagens Nyheter, and Jan Andersson in Göteborgs-Posten.

He wrote and directed Land of Sin (2026), a Netflix original crime series set in Scania.

== Filmmaking credits ==
Year	Title	Director	Writer	Notes	Ref.
2009	Jonny Heiskanen	Yes	Yes	Short film	
2010	Bröderna Jaukka	Yes	Yes	Short film	
2011	The Clearing	Yes	Yes	Short film	
2015	Drifters	Yes	Yes		
2018	Goliath	Yes	Yes		
2020	Beartown	Yes	No	TV series	
2026	Land of Sin	Yes	Yes	TV series	

== Awards and nominations ==
Year	Award	Work	Result	Ref.
2016	Guldbagge Award for Best Screenplay	Drifters	Won	
2019	Guldbagge Award for Best Screenplay	Goliath	Won	
