= Joakim Zander =

Swedish author and lawyer (born 1975)

Joakim Zander (born 1975 in Stockholm, Sweden) is a Swedish author and lawyer. His debut novel Simmaren (English title The Swimmer) was published by Wahlström & Widstrand in September 2013.

== Biography ==
Joakim Zander was raised in Söderköping, Sweden. He studied law at Uppsala University and later earned a PhD in Law from Maastricht University. His dissertation The Application of the Precautionary Principle in Practice was published by Cambridge University Press, and was awarded the Rabobank Prize in 2012. Joakim Zander has worked for the European Parliament and the European Commission in Brussels, Belgium. He currently lives in Lund, Sweden with his wife and two children.

== Klara Walldéen series ==
Zander's 2013 novel Simmaren (The Swimmer in English) is the first in his thriller series featuring the heroine Klara Waldéen. The book was followed by Orten (2015) and Vännen (2017).

== Works ==
=== Nonfiction ===
- The Application of the Precautionary Principle in Practice, Cambridge University Press, 2010

=== Fiction ===
- Simmaren, 2013 (English translation: The Swimmer)
- Orten, 2015 (English translation: The Brother)
- Vännen, 2017 (English translation: The Friend)
