= Lars Kepler =

Swedish author duo

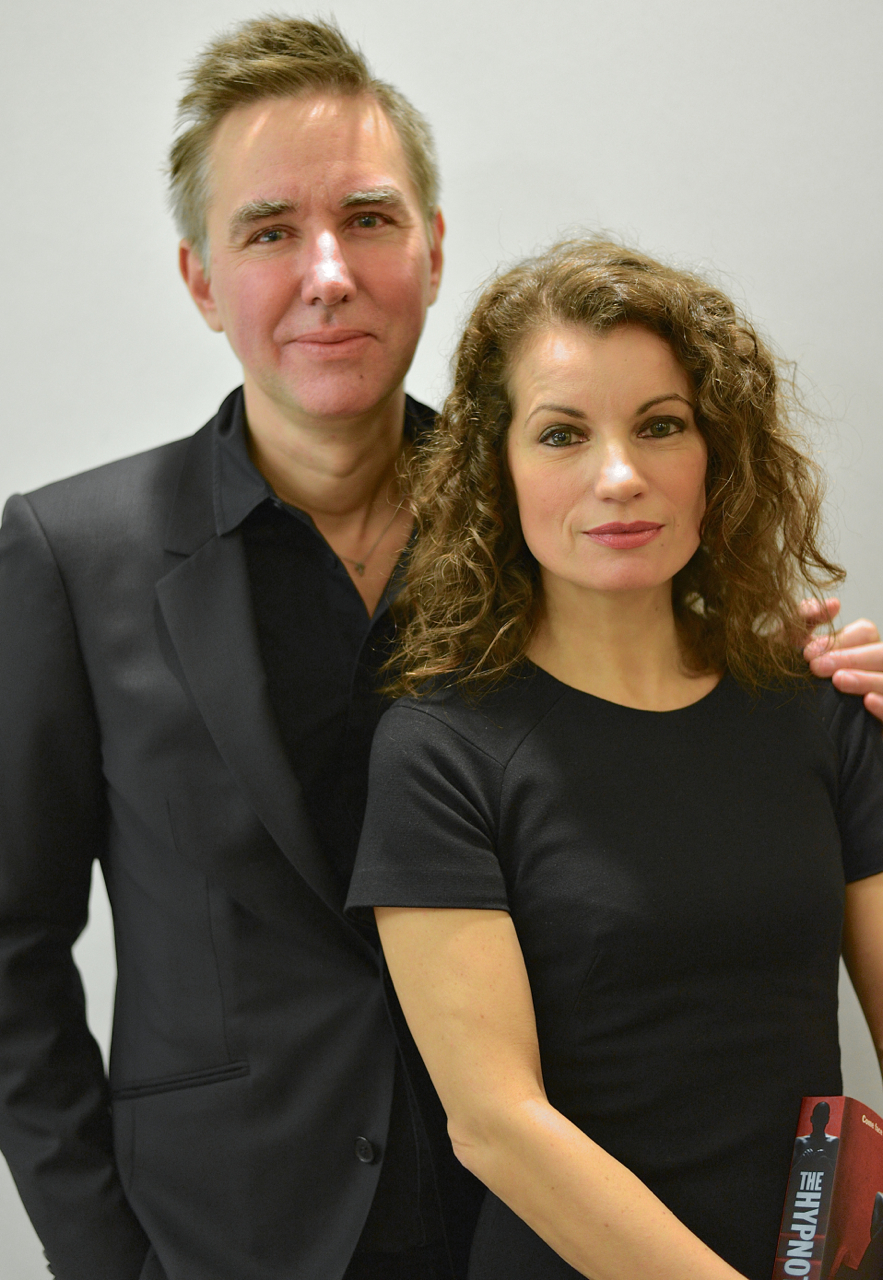
Alexander Ahndoril and Alexandra Coelho Ahndoril

Lars Kepler is the pseudonym of Swedish husband and wife team Alexander Ahndoril (born 1967) and Alexandra Coelho Ahndoril (born 1966), authors of the Joona Linna series. With nine installments to date, the series has sold 15 million copies in 40 languages. The Ahndorils were both established writers before they adopted the pen name Lars Kepler, and have each published several acclaimed novels.

The Joona Linna series follows Joona Linna, Detective Superintendent at the police's National Operations Department, Saga Bauer, an Operational Superintendent at the Swedish Security Service, and Erik Maria Bark (in The Hypnotist and Stalker), a trained psychiatrist and psychotherapist specialised in psycho-traumatology and disaster psychiatry.

In autumn 2015, Lars Kepler's sixth novel was published in Sweden, a stand-alone novel entitled Playground.

On 18 February 2020, Albert Bonniers Förlag announced that Lars Kepler was the best-selling author of the decade – Swedish or international – in Sweden, across all categories, genres and formats.

== The name Lars Kepler ==
Lars is a homage to the Swedish crime fiction author Stieg Larsson as he inspired the duo to start writing crime fiction. The name Kepler comes from the German scientist Johannes Kepler (1571–1630), who solved one of his time's greatest mysteries: it was his calculations of the planets’ orbits that paved the way for Newton's theses about gravity.

== The mystery of the pseudonym ==
British media first pointed out Henning Mankell as the person behind the pseudonym Lars Kepler, but this was quickly denied by both Mankell himself and Bonniers, the Swedish publisher of Lars Kepler's books. Several others were also suspected of being the author in question. In August 2009, Swedish newspaper Aftonbladet revealed that the spouses Ahndoril were in fact the ones behind the pseudonym. This was shortly thereafter confirmed by the couple's publishing house through a press release. That the two created a third, fictional author to represent them can be considered a natural extension of their early individual careers, wherein they both experimented with the blurring of the line between fiction and reality, and incorporating the author as a subject. Most well-known is the example of how Alexander Ahndoril in his novel The Director (2006) crafted a fictive but plausible story about the director Ingmar Bergman’s life. Alexandra Coelho Ahndoril too has addressed this subject. In an article about the Portuguese writer Fernando Pessoa, in the magazine Hjärnstorm, she writes about his way of working with so-called heteronyms, a kind of pseudonyms that act as independent individuals. She gives her view of why an author might choose such a trope: “He has created the opportunity to write something that may not be true, but is at least not false. If both writer and feeling are products of the text, then the link between prose and experience remains unbroken". For the spouses Ahndoril, the pseudonym was a method for writing together without limitations, while the secrecy around it stemmed from a desire to let Lars Kepler stand on his own two legs, and have his books assessed without prejudice.

== Personal lives ==
Alexander grew up in Upplands Väsby, twenty kilometers north of Stockholm. He has always been an avid reader, but wanted to be a painter in his youth. For many years he produced big oil paintings inspired by Caravaggio. He practiced Muay Thai and was accepted into a ranger unit, moved to central Stockholm and studied philosophy, religion, and film at university. His first novel was picked up when he was only nineteen. Before he began writing as Lars Kepler he had already penned nine novels, twenty theatre plays, and one opera libretto.

Alexandra grew up in southern Sweden. She discovered early on that she wanted to become an actress and attended the National Academy of Mime and Acting in Stockholm. She thereafter got a master's degree in literary science, was hired as a PhD student at university, and began writing a dissertation on the Portuguese poet Fernando Pessoa. She produced three historical novels before she began writing together with Alexander.

Alexander and Alexandra married in 1994 and have three daughters together. They live in central Stockholm.

== Bibliography ==
The novels with Joona Linna

- Hypnotisören (2009) (English: The Hypnotist)
- Paganinikontraktet (2010) (English: The Nightmare)
- Eldvittnet (2011) (English: The Fire Witness)
- Sandmannen (2012) (English: The Sandman)
- Stalker (2014) (English: Stalker)
- Kaninjägaren (2016) (English: The Rabbit Hunter)
- Lazarus (2018) (English: Lazarus)
- Spegelmannen (2020) (English: The Mirror Man)
- Spindeln (2022) (English: The Spider)
- Sömngångaren (2024) (English: The Sleepwalker)
- Medusa (2026) (English: Medusa)

Exofiction

- Playground (2015) (en français : "Playground")

== Film and TV series ==
- The Hypnotist (Swedish: Hypnotisören) is a 2012 Swedish crime thriller film directed by Lasse Hallström, based on the first "Joona Linna" novel of the same name by Lars Kepler. The film was selected as the Swedish entry for Best Foreign Language Film category at the 85th Academy Awards, but it did not make the final shortlist.
- Nocturne is an Apple TV series from writers Rowan Joffé and John Hlavin, based on the fourth "Joona Linna" novel series by Kepler. The series premiered on October 30, 2026.
