= Uppsalatidningen =

Swedish newspaper

Uppsalatidningen was a politically independent free newspaper in Uppsala, Sweden, published by Direct Press. The magazine was first published January 16, 2005 and was distributed to all households in Uppsala until the end of its publication in 2023. In many public places in Uppsala and its surroundings it was found in magazine racks. The paper monitored the municipality including society, culture, sports and entertainment from a local perspective. Circulation was 100,000 copies, of which 80,800 were sent directly to households every Friday, 18,900 copies were distributed via news stands and 300 copies were delivered addressed.

== Public debate and opinion ==
The paper participated actively in the public debate and information regarding the Uppsala area. The paper for several years monitored the state of opinion such as municipal elections in 2006 and 2010.
