= Interrogation (TV series) =

American true crime television series

- Genre: True crime; Drama
- Created by: Anders Weidemann; John Mankiewicz
- Starring: Peter Sarsgaard; David Strathairn; Kodi Smit-McPhee
- Opening theme: "Keep in the Dark" by Temples
- Country of origin: United States
- Original language: English
- No. of seasons: 1
- No. of episodes: 10

Production
- Executive producers: Anders Weidemann; John Mankiewicz; Henrik Bastin; Melissa Aouate
- Production companies: 4th Wall Productions; Wilton Crawley; Fabrik Entertainment; CBS Television Studios

Original release
- Network: CBS All Access
- Release: February 6, 2020

Interrogation is an American true crime drama television series, created by Anders Weidemann and John Mankiewicz, that premiered on CBS All Access on February 6, 2020. In November 2020, the series was canceled after one season. The season was inspired by the Bruce Lisker conviction for the murder of his mother, when he was age 17.

== Premise ==
Interrogation is described as "an original concept based on a true story that spanned more than 30 years, in which a young man was charged and convicted of brutally murdering his mother. Each episode is structured around an interrogation taken directly from the real police case files, with the goal of turning the viewer into a detective. The first nine episodes of the series are available to watch in any order, and the conclusive season finale was released later." All ten episodes have been released.

== Cast ==
=== Main ===
- Peter Sarsgaard as Det. David Russell
- Kyle Gallner as Eric Fisher
- David Strathairn as Henry Fisher
- Kodi Smit-McPhee as Chris Keller

=== Recurring ===
- Vincent D'Onofrio as Sgt. Ian Lynch
- Joanna Going as Mary Fisher
- Ebon Moss-Bachrach as Trey Carano
- Andre Royo as Charlie Shannon
- Chad L. Coleman as Mr. Franklin
- Frank Whaley as Det. James Connor
- Pat Healy as Robert Sullivan
- Melinda McGraw as Faith Turner
- Michael Harney as Mr. Russell
- Vinessa Antoine as Sandy
- Autry Haydon-Wilson as Young Amy Harlow
- Ellen Humphreys as Sharon Russell
- Morgan Taylor Campbell as Kimberly Decker

== Episodes ==
No.	Title	Directed by	Written by	Original release date
1	"Det. Dave Russell vs Eric Fisher 1983"	Ernest Dickerson	Anders Weidemann & John Mankiewicz	February 6, 2020
2	"I.A. Sgt. Ian Lynch vs Eric Fisher 2003"	Patrick Cady	Anders Weidemann & John Mankiewicz	February 6, 2020
3	"Det. Dave Russell vs Kim Decker 1982"	Patrick Cady	Tian Jun Gu	February 6, 2020
4	"L.A. County Psychologist Marjorie Thompson vs. Eric Fisher 1984"	Ernest Dickerson	Barbara Curry	February 6, 2020
5	"Det. Dave Russell vs Chris Keller 1983"	Patrick Cady	Cassie Pappas	February 6, 2020
6	"Henry Fisher vs Eric Fisher 1992"	Ernest Dickerson	Teleplay by : John Mankiewicz; Story by : Jerry Miller & John Mankiewicz	February 6, 2020
7	"Det. Carol Young & Det. Brian Chen vs Melanie Pruitt 2005"	Ernest Dickerson	Barbara Curry	February 6, 2020
8	"P.I. Charlie Shannon vs Eric Fisher 1996"	Ernest Dickerson	Bill Balas	February 6, 2020
9	"P.I. Charlie Shannon vs Amy Harlow 2003"	Patrick Cady	Johanna Factor	February 6, 2020
10	"I.A. Sgt. Ian Lynch & Det. Brian Chen vs Trey Carano 2003"	Ernest Dickerson	Anders Weidemann	February 6, 2020

== Production ==
=== Development ===
On November 12, 2018, it was announced that CBS All Access had given the production a straight-to-series order for first season consisting of ten episodes. The series was created by Anders Weidemann and John Mankiewicz who were also expected to executive produce alongside Henrik Bastin and Melissa Aouate. Production companies involved with the series were slated to consist of Fabrik Entertainment and CBS Television Studios. While the series is based on a real-life criminal case, CBS All Access was not revealing the case in question at the time of the announcement. Furthermore, at that point, scripts for the series featured the real names of the people involved in the case, and it had not been decided yet whether they would be changed. At the time the events originally occurred, the case did not make national news but was reportedly well known to people living in the area where it happened. On December 12, 2019, key art was released, revealing a February 6, 2020 premiere date. In February 2020, it was reported that the show was based on the case of Bruce Lisker. On November 4, 2020, CBS All Access canceled the series after one season. In January 2023, the series was removed from Paramount+.

=== Casting ===
In January 2019, it was announced that Peter Sarsgaard and David Strathairn had been cast in starring roles. On February 7, 2019, it was reported that Kodi Smit-McPhee had joined the main cast. On March 11, 2019, it was announced that Frank Whaley had been cast in a recurring role. On March 28, 2019, it was reported that Pat Healy, Melinda McGraw, and Michael Harney has been cast in recurring roles. On April 3, 2019, it was announced that Ebon Moss-Bachrach had been cast in a recurring capacity. On April 8, 2019, it was reported that Vincent D'Onofrio had been cast in a recurring role. On May 8, 2019, it was announced that Vinessa Antoine had joined the cast in a recurring capacity.

== Reception ==
The review aggregator website Rotten Tomatoes reported a 57% approval rating for the series with an average rating of 6.21/10, based on 14 reviews. The website's critical consensus states, "Interrogation's "interactive" qualities are interesting, but ultimately get in the way of what could be a satisfying dramatic experience." On Metacritic, it has a weighted average score of 54 out of 100, based on 8 critics, indicating "mixed or average reviews".
