= Alexandra Coelho Ahndoril =

Swedish writer (born 1966)

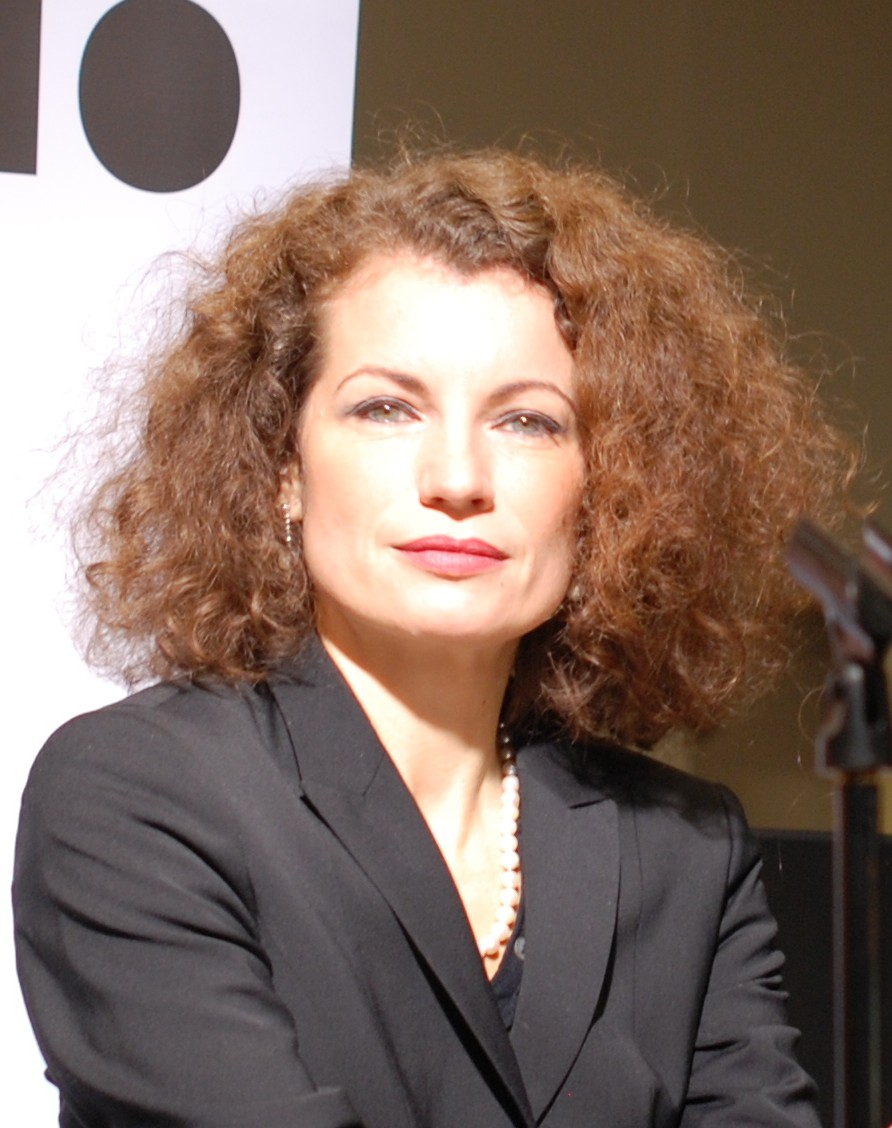
- Born: 1966 (age 59–60); Helsingborg, Sweden
- Occupations: Novelist; playwright
- Spouse: Alexander Ahndoril

Alexandra Coelho Ahndoril (born 1966) is a Swedish writer. She was born to a Portuguese mother and a Swedish father, and grew up in Helsingborg on the south coast of Sweden. In the early 90s Alexandra moved to Stockholm to pursue a career in acting before changing her focus to the art of writing.

In 2003, she published her debut novel Stjärneborg (Stjerneborg) about the life of astronomer Tycho Brahe. The novel received the Katapult Prize the following year, and was followed by Birgitta och Katarina (Birgitta and Katarina, 2006) about the life of Saint Birgitta of Sweden, and Mäster (2009), about the radical socialist August Palm.

Together with her husband Alexander Ahndoril, Alexandra writes under the pseudonym Lars Kepler, author of the internationally bestselling Joona Linna series.

In addition to her work as an author, Alexandra has also been a literary critic for two of Sweden's largest newspapers, Göteborgs-Posten and Dagens Nyheter.
