= Alexander Ahndoril =

Swedish author

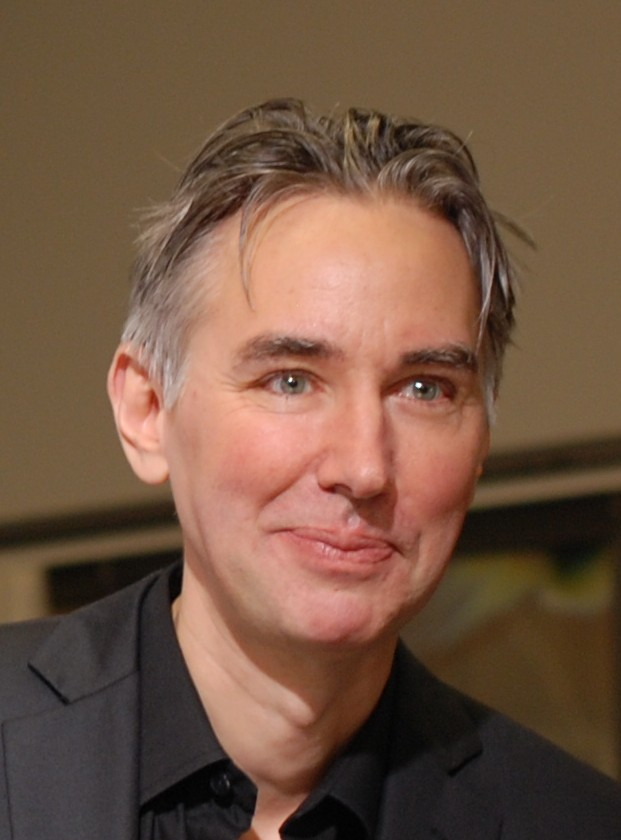
- Alexander Ahndoril at Bokmässan in Gothenburg in 2010.
- Born: Alexander Gustafson; 20 January 1967 (age 59); Stockholm, Sweden
- Occupations: Novelist and playwright
- Spouse: Alexandra Coelho Ahndoril

Alexander Ahndoril (born 20 January 1967 in Upplands Väsby, Stockholm) is a Swedish writer. He made his literary debut at the age of 22 with the love story Den äkta kvinnan (The True Woman, 1989). He has since authored nine novels, screenplays, radio scripts and stage plays.

Among the works that have gathered most attention is Regissören (The Director, 2006) a novel about Ingmar Bergman. Regissören was nominated for several awards, including the Independent Foreign Fiction Prize, and has been translated into 11 languages.

Together with his wife Alexandra Coelho Ahndoril, Alexander writes under the pseudonym Lars Kepler, author of the Joona Linna series.

In 2009, with his ninth novel Diplomaten, he was published, which is a fictional story about a Swedish diplomat's struggle to disarm Iraq in 2003. There is no doubt that Hans Blix is the main character in the parallel universe that the novel constitutes. Both foreword and afterwords state that the diplomat's private sphere is as fictitious as the public is truthful.

Alexander Ahndoril, together with his wife Alexandra Coelho Ahndoril, has written The Hypnotist, The Paganini Contract, The Fire Witness, The Sandman and The Stalker under the pseudonym Lars Kepler and has reached a worldwide audience, publishing in 40 different language areas.
