= Drifters (2015 film) =

2015 film

- Film poster
- Directed by: Peter Grönlund
- Written by: Peter Grönlund
- Starring: Malin Levanon
- Release dates: 20 September 2015 (San Sebastian); 16 October 2015 (Sweden)
- Running time: 92 minutes
- Country: Sweden
- Language: Swedish

Drifters (Swedish: Tjuvheder) is a 2015 Swedish crime film directed by Peter Grönlund. It won five awards at the 51st Guldbagge Awards.

== Plot ==
Middle-aged drug-addict woman Minna Sundqvist's life in Stockholm is in chaos and after losing her apartment and some deals gone wrong she finds herself in debt to a infamous street pusher and sinks deeper into the dangerous street world of petty thieves and robbers and pimps. She finds refuge in a homeless camp and befriends the alcoholic single-mother Katja who Minna's stressful situation with drug debts is also starting to pull down.

== Cast ==
- Malin Levanon as Minna
- Lo Kauppi as Katja
- Tomasz Neuman as Boris
- Jan Mattson as Christer Korsbäck
- Niklas Björklund as Benneth
- Nadya Sundberg Solander as Carina
- Kicki Ferdinandsson as Mette
- Kalled Mustonen as Tonni
