= Beartown (novel) =

2016 novel by Fredrik Backman

- First edition (Swedish)
- Author: Fredrik Backman
- Original title: Björnstad
- Translator: Neil Smith
- Language: Swedish
- Series: Beartown series
- Genre: Novel
- Publisher: Piratförlaget (Sweden); Simon & Schuster (US)
- Publication date: 2016 (Sweden); 2017 (U.S.)
- Publication place: Sweden
- Media type: Print
- Pages: 418 pp (US)
- ISBN: 9781501160769
- Followed by: Us Against You

Beartown (original title in Swedish: Björnstad) is a novel by Swedish writer Fredrik Backman. The novel, noted as "hockey literature", centers on a declining youth hockey team in a small town. The story follows the events leading up to a violent incident involving two teenagers and the consequences that they face, the hockey players, their families, friends, and the community which has a long-standing reputation as a hockey town. It is the first book in the Beartown series, followed by Us Against You and The Winners.

== Plot ==
The junior hockey team is the backbone of the small town of Beartown, where a win in the national games would mean more resources given to the team. The star of the team is 17-year-old Kevin Erdahl, whose talent is so outstanding that the entire junior team has been built around him since he was about seven years old. Peter Andersson is the General Manager of the team, and the new coach is David, after the previous coach was fired by the council for not focusing on winning enough. Peter's family consists of his wife Kira, and his children Maya and Leo. Maya is close friends with another girl, Ana.

The novel opens with the team and the community preparing for a key semi-final game. Recognizing that lack of speed is a weakness, senior team coach Sune and David agree to add underage junior Amat to improve their chances. Amat is grateful to be on the team, especially for his mother, who works as a cleaner. Beartown wins the semi-final, at least partly because the opposing team was not prepared to defend Amat's speed.

On the night of the semi-final victory, Kevin's parents are out of town. This gives Kevin the opportunity to host a big party for his team and many other teenagers from the community. At the party, many of the teenagers are drinking and indulging in marijuana use and the team members boast about having sex with the supportive female fans. Maya and Kevin sneak off to an upstairs bedroom to make out. Maya resists Kevin's advances, and he proceeds to rape her. Amat, himself drunk and harboring feelings for Maya, stumbles in to witness the rape. Maya takes advantage of Amat's intrusion to free herself from Kevin.

Maya has had a crush on Kevin for some time and is devastated by his attack. She struggles to cope for a week, knowing that reporting the crime will tear the town apart. After a week from her rape, she tells her parents, who are furious and immediately report the crime to the police. Kevin is pulled from playing in the final happening that day, to the anger and shock of the rest of the team. They play the final without Kevin and lose.

As the news spreads of Maya's accusation and the team's loss in the final, many people in the town turn against Maya's family. Kevin's father believes that Maya's accusation is a lie and that Peter, out of jealousy, intentionally reported it the day of the final to cause the team to lose. Kevin's father pushes the sponsors and the council board to fire Peter. He also attempts to bribe Amat into silence by giving his mother a better job, but his mother refuses, telling him to be honest.

The hockey club holds a vote to decide whether Peter should be fired from his position as General Manager. Amat testifies as a witness on how he saw Kevin rape Maya, much to the anger of the rest of the team. The town's barkeep believes Maya and Amat's story and convinces a large group of hockey fans to vote in Peter's favor, resulting in Peter keeping his job. However, David is frustrated with Peter's “mixing of politics and hockey” and moves to a neighboring town, bringing with him Kevin and most of the team, along with the town's sponsors. Only Amat, and three other players stay back to support Beartown.

The rape case against Kevin is dropped due to insufficient evidence. Maya continues to suffer distress and decides she must either kill herself or kill Kevin to be relieved of the pain. Late at night, Maya surprises Kevin with a shotgun and forces him to kneel in front of her. Maya thrusts the gun to a whimpering Kevin's forehead and pulls the trigger, but he doesn't die as she intentionally didn't load the gun. Maya reasons that the fear Kevin felt at the moment she pulled the trigger will continue to haunt him for the rest of his life, just as the rape will haunt her.

In the end, the events of the subsequent ten years are sketched out. Maya is a popular guitarist and has a chance encounter with Kevin, who is now married. Maya recognizes Kevin and realizes she can expose him in public but chooses not to. When he leaves shaken, his wife asks him who Maya is, and Kevin tells her the truth about what happened.

== Characters ==
- Maya Andersson: a 15-year-old girl who loves playing the guitar and has mixed feelings about hockey
- Peter Andersson: Maya's father and General Manager for Beartown's Hockey Team, former team star turned NHL player, returned to Beartown as the hero
- Kevin Erdahl: rapist, an outstanding young hockey player who is the star of his junior team
- Ana: Maya's best friend
- Kira Andersson: Maya's mother, lawyer, married to Peter
- Kevin's parents: Neither parent is named in the book, but Kevin's father is one of the main sponsors of the hockey team.
- Amat: a speedy underage player who is promoted to play with Kevin's junior team
- Fatima: Amat's mother, who works as cleaner for the rink.
- Zacharias: Amat's friend, a bullied boy with lots of stored up anger
- Lifa: Amat's other friend, also Zacharias' friend
- Benji: Kevin's best friend, and “enforcer” defending Kevin on the ice.
- David: the coach of Kevin and Benji's junior team
- Bobo, Filip and William Lyt: team-mates of Kevin and Benji
- Sune: Beartown's A-Team Hockey Coach (level above Junior team coached by David)
- Ramona: proprietress of the Bearskin, the local pub
- Maggan Lyt: William's mother
- Jeanette: a teacher at the local high school
- "Tails": one of the sponsors of the hockey club
- Ann-Katrin and Hog: Bobo's parents
- Adri, Katia and Gaby: Benji's older sisters
- Leo: Kira and Peter's son
- The unnamed president of the hockey club
- The unnamed bass player who becomes Benji's lover

== Television adaptation ==
In 2020, a five-episode miniseries adaptation called Björnstad was added to HBO Nordic. The series premiered as Beartown on HBO in North America on February 22, 2021. It received generally positive reviews from critics. It is no longer available on HBO in the US.

In 2022 with the occasion of the launch of Skyshowtime service streaming platform, Showtime gained from HBO over 20 TV series including the Beartown series.
