= Bina Qeredaxi =

Kurdish filmmaker and media promoter from Iraq

- بینا قه‌ره‌داغی
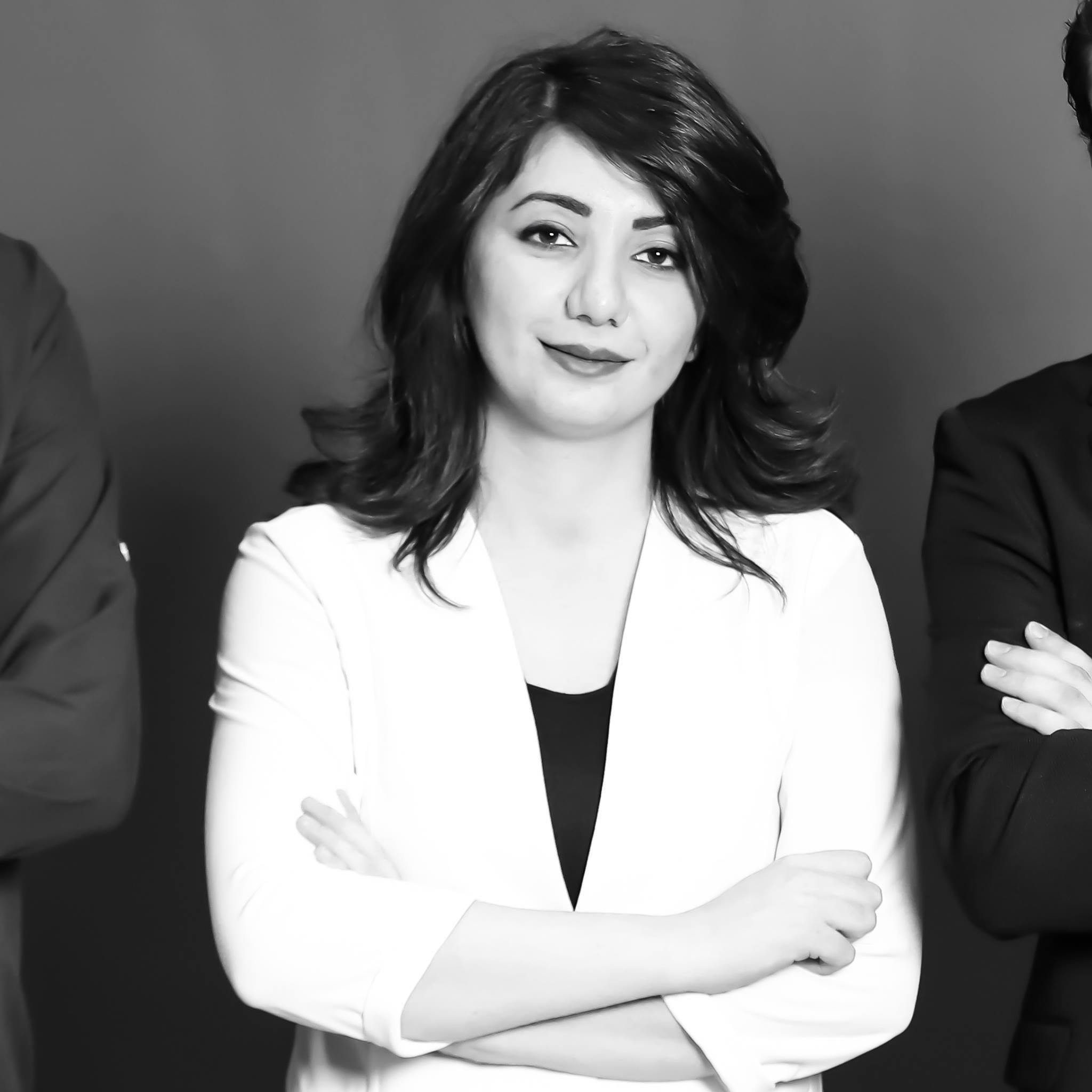
- Born: 12 October 1988 (age 37); Duhok, Kurdistan
- Education: University of Duhok
- Occupations: Filmmaker & Program Manager at Duhok IFF
- Years active: 2007 – present
- Organization: Duhok International Film Festival
- Known for: Filmmaking, Television work, Kurdish Cultural Promotion
- Notable work: Bekas, Before Snowfall
- Television: Tik Tak, Restart
- Title: Program Manager
- Term: 2013 – present
- Awards: Kurdistan Ministry of Culture's Honorary Award (2013), Kurdistan Journalists Union Honorary Award (2015)
- Website: duhokiff.com

Bina Majid Mustafa, known as Bina Qeredaxi (Kurdish: بینا قه‌ره‌داغی), was born in 1988 in Duhok, Kurdistan Region of Iraq. She is a filmmaker and media specialist with over nine years of experience in filmmaking, Television industry and cultural management. Bina has earned her BA in Law and Politics in 2010 at University of Duhok but started her film and media career in 2007 with writing and directing a popular social awareness-raising show named (Tik Tak) for Kurdistan TV channel, followed by several other TV shows in lead Kurdish channels. In the past years, she worked in different positions in award-winning films such as "Bekas" by Karzan Kadir. She is the co-founder and program manager of Duhok International Film Festival.

== Career ==
=== Television ===
In 2007, and while Bina was still studying for her bachelor's degree, she started her media career by writing and directing a top-rated social awareness-raising show called "Tik Tak" in Kurdistan TV. Following her successful start, she directed and worked on many other social efficient TV shows in lead Kurdish channels such as "Restart" in WAAR TV In 2015 and Eventually Worked as an Assistant Program Manager in Rudaw Media Network.

=== Film productions ===
As an expert in Media Productions, Bina started her involvement with the new-born wave of Independent Kurdish cinema in Kurdistan Region. She took a role in most of the International film co-productions by seizing different roles and positions in film productions as Assistant Director, Casting Director, and Production coordinator in award-winning films such as "Bekas" by Karzan Kader and "Before Snowfall" by Hisham Zaman.

=== Music videos ===
Bina has also worked as a director on several music videos for Kurdish artists, with a special different style in the Kurdish music videos scene.

=== Events ===
One of Bina Qeredaxi's achievements was co-founding Duhok Film Festival in 2010, which was another uplift to the Kurdish cinema in the Kurdistan region of Iraq, as now the Duhok International Film Festival is considered the most significant film festival in Kurdistan. Currently, she is the program manager of the Duhok IFF since 2013. She was the head of the Kurdish Delegation at Nashville Film Festival 2013 in the United States and covered the Celebration of Kurdish Cinema Event which was organized by Nashville Film Festival with the Academy Partnership for Kurdish Film Celebration

== Public speaking and appearances ==
As a cultural manager, Bina has been an active ambassador for the Kurdish cinema worldwide by promoting Kurdish films and cultural identity, locally and internationally.

=== TEDx ===
In 2017, she has been a speaker in TEDxDuhok conference, and presented a speech about the soft power and its effect on third world countries.

=== FilmArche ===
In May 2017, Bina Qeredaxi presented a speech to the students of the FilmArche school in Berlin about the difficulties confronting women who are working in the filmmaking and media industry in the middle-eastern conservative societies, as well as the role of the Duhok IFF in promoting the cultural identity of Kurdistan worldwide.

=== Nashville film festival ===
In April 2013, within the framework of Nashville Film Festival in Tennessee, Bina Qeredaxi along with three other filmmakers, presented a panel about the risks of filmmaking in the middle east.

== Filmography ==
- Separation (2017) by Hakar Abdulqader – Researcher
- Die Schwalbe (2016) by Mano Khalil – Casting Director
- Memories on Stone (2014) by Shawkat Amin Korki – Extras Coordinator
- Krigsduvor (2014) by Zanyar Adami – First Assistant Director
- Before Snowfall (2013) by Hisham Zaman– Casting Assistant Director & Production coordinator
- Bekas (2012) by Karzan Kader – Second Assistant Director

== Awards ==
- Kurdistan's Ministry of Culture and Youth's Honorary Award for best female filmmaker – 2013.
- Kurdistan Journalists Union's Honorary Award for the strong presence in the Media sector – 2015.
