= Almquist =

Almquist is a surname. Notable people with the surname include:

- Ansgar Almquist (1889–1973), Swedish sculptor
- Bengt Idestam-Almquist (1895–1983), Swedish screenwriter
- Carl Almquist (1848–1924), Swedish stained-glass artist who worked in Britain
- Don Almquist (1929–2022), American painter and illustrator
- Edgar “Ed” Almquist (1921–2015), American automotive engineer, manufacturer, inventor
- Erik Viktor Almquist (1817–1872), Swedish politician
- Harold V. Almquist (1904–1994), American football, basketball, and baseball player and coach
- John O. Almquist (1921–2015), American agricultural scientist, inventor of artificial insemination
- Theodore C. Almquist (1941–2010), American Air Force Brigadier General
- Wallace E. Almquist (1922–2022), American petroleum engineer & inventor

== See also ==
- Almquist shell, a command-line interpreter used by the Unix computer operating system
- Almqvist
