= Johanna Emanuelsson =

Swedish screenwriter and playwright (born 1986)

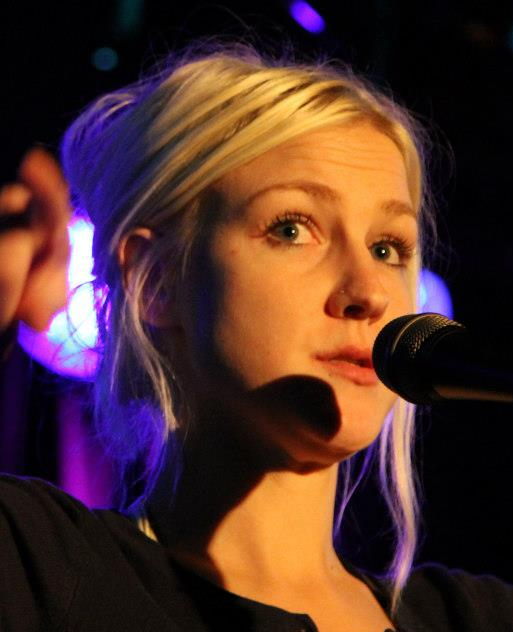
- Emanuelsson in 2012
- Born: 1986 (age 39–40); Gothenburg, Sweden
- Education: Stockholm Academy of Dramatic Arts
- Occupations: Screenwriter; playwright
- Writing career
- Years active: 2008–present
- Notable work: Beyond Dreams (2017)

Johanna Emanuelsson (born 1986) is a Swedish screenwriter and playwright. She is known for her writing Beyond Dreams (2017), which was her debut feature film credit. It won several awards, including the Audience Dragon Award for Best Nordic Film and the Golden Leaf for Best Film at the Duhok International Film Festival. Emanuelsson has also written a number of plays, including Älvsborgsbron (2010), Pennskaftet (2019), and Ett svenskt brott (2025).

== Biography ==
Emanuelsson was born in 1986. She has an older sister and was raised in the Bergsjön neighborhood of Gothenburg. For upper secondary school she attended Munkebäcks Gymnasium.

Her first play was Syster i krig (English: Sister in war), which debuted in 2008.

She attended the Stockholm Academy of Dramatic Arts. While studying there, she staged Älvsborgsbron at Unga Dramaten, which won two awards. It received a positive review from Karin Helander in Svenska Dagbladet and a mixed review from Maria Edström in Sveriges Radio. She then received a scholarship from the Colombine Theatre Agency to study at the Royal Court Theatre in London.

In 2017, she made her screenwriting debut with Beyond Dreams, which received positive reviews from critics. It won the Church of Sweden's Film Prize, the Audience Dragon Award for Best Nordic Film, and the FIPRESCI Prize at the Norwegian International Film Festival. Beyond Dreams also won the Golden Leaf for Best Film at the Duhok International Film Festival, which is the most significant Kurdish film festival. It was also screened at Berlin Feminist Film Week.

Her 2019 adaptation of Elin Wägner's novel Pennskaftet was staged at Uppsala City Theater in 2019, with direction by Maria Löfgren. The play received a generally positive review by Maina Arvas in Dagens Nyheter and from Sara Granath in Svenska Dagbladet.

She wrote Ett svenskt brott (English: A Swedish crime), which premiered at Uppsala City Theater on 1 February 2025. It was inspired by the death of Emanuelsson's mother, a nurse who died after being injured at work. The play was a commentary on crisis in the Swedish welfare state and its effects on working-class women.

== Writing credits ==
=== Screenwriting ===
| Year | Title | Notes | Ref. |
|---|---|---|---|
| 2017 | Beyond Dreams | | |

=== Playwriting ===
| Year | Title | Venue | Notes | Ref. |
|---|---|---|---|---|
| 2008 | Syster i krig | | | |
| 2011 | Älvsborgsbron | Unga Dramaten | | |
| 2019 | Pennskaftet | Uppsala City Theater | | |
| 2025 | Ett svenskt brott | Uppsala City Theater | | |
