= Aliette Opheim =

Swedish actress (born 1985)

- Born: 1985 (age 40–41)
- Education: University of Gothenburg
- Occupation: Actress
- Known for: Caliphate; Knutby
- Awards: Best Actress Kristallen (2022)

Aliette Opheim (born 1985) is a Swedish actress. She is best known for her roles in Caliphate (2020) and Knutby (2021–2025). She was recognized at Kristallen for both series, with a nomination and a win, respectively. She also won a Rising Star Award at the 2015 Stockholm International Film Festival.

== Early life and education ==
Aliette Opheim was born in 1985. She grew up in Täby, Sweden, and has a younger brother who was adopted from Ethiopia. She left home right after finishing high school. At the age of 19, she had her first role in a feature film with Sandor slash Ida (2005).

In early adulthood, she struggled with a destructive relationship and worked as a stripper to pay off her debt. A turning point occurred when her grandmother was diagnosed with ALS. Opheim moved to Trollhättan to take care of her until her death.

She then attended the Academy of Music and Drama at the University of Gothenburg from 2012 to 2015.

== Acting career ==
Opheim had a minor role in Mending Hugo's Heart (2017).

In 2020, she starred in Caliphate, a TV thriller about Islamic fundamentalism set in both Sweden and Syria. She played Fatima, a SÄPO counter-terrorism agent. For the series, she and co-star Gizem Erdogan were both nominated for Best Actress in a TV Production at Kristallen 2021.

She had a supporting role in the 2020 drama series Beartown, which received positive reviews from both Swedish and international critics. Writing for Dagens Nyheter, Jacob Lundström wrote that her character had been relegated to a "helpless supporting figure, rather than a person in her own right", but nonetheless commended her performance.

In the 2022 series The Dark Heart (Swedish: Mörkt hjärta), she played the lead role of a dogged missing persons detective. The series was based on a real case in Småland. The same year, she also had a role in the post-acopalyptic war thriller Black Crab.

Her performance in the second season of Knutby, known as Knutby – Christ's Bride (Swedish: Knutby – Kristi brud), was given particular praise in a review by Karolina Fjellborg in Aftonbladet.

In May 2025, it was announced that Opheim would be playing Eva in the upcoming film adaptation of Andrev Walden's August Prize-winning play Jävla karlar.

== Awards and honors ==
In 2015, Stockholm International Film Festival's Rising Star Award went to Opheim, for her performance in Lisa Aschan's White People.

She won Actress of the Year at the Kristallen Awards 2022 for her performance in Knutby.

== Personal life ==
As of March 2025, she lived in Södermalm with her partner.

== Filmography ==
- Sandor slash Ida (2005)
- Thicker Than Water (2014)
- 100 Code (2015)
- Patriot (2015–2018)
- Mending Hugo's Heart (2017)
- Caliphate (2020)
- Beartown (2020)
- Katla (2021)
- Zebrarummet (2021)
- Knutby (2021)
- The Dark Heart (2022)
- Black Crab (2022)
- Knutby – Christ's Bride (2025)
- Vaka (2026)
