= Marall Nasiri =

Swedish actress (born 1980)

- Born: 1980 (age 45–46); Iran
- Education: Theatre Academy of Stockholm
- Occupation: Actress
- Awards: Guldbagge Award for Best Actress in a Leading Role (2023)

Marall Nasiri (born 1980) is a Swedish actress. She won a Guldbagge Award for Best Actress in a Leading Role for playing Maryam in Opponent (2023).

== Early life and education ==
She was born in Iran in 1980, shortly after the Iran–Iraq War broke out. Her parents were considered dissidents and were forced to live in hiding, before becoming refugees in Pakistan. When she was six years old, the family moved to Sweden. They lived initially in Linköping before settling in Bredäng, in the south of Stockholm. She graduated from the Theatre Academy of Stockholm in 2009.

== Career ==
She played Lottie in a Rickard Günther-directed staging of Don Juan in Soho at Stockholm City Theatre in 2007. The production received a generally negative review from Jenny Aschenbrenner in Dagens Nyheter; she found Nasiri's character overtly stereotypical and unconvincing. The following year, she appeared in a theatre student graduation programme. In 2011, Nasiri was featured in Yvonne, prinsessa av Burgund at Backa Theatre in Gothenburg. She starred in a Sveriges Radio P1 drama Någonas heder, which was broadcast on 21 January 2012 to coincide with the tenth anniversary of the murder of Fadime Sahindal. Nasiri played Zahra, an ambitious high school student who finds herself threatened by family upheaval and honour culture after being seen with a male classmate. That March, she was in Mattias Andersson's adaptation of August Strindberg's A Dream Play, which was presented on the Klara stage of Stockholm City Theatre. It used an experimental structure, blending Strindberg's original text with real-life sociological interviews and new fictional elements. Critic Leif Zern deemed the production a "masterpiece" (mästerverket) and a "miraculously vibrant performance" (mirakulöst levande föreställning). She also appeared in Utopia 2012, another experimental, interview-based Andersson stage production at Backa Theatre in October.

In 2013, Stockholm City Theatre staged Jag ringer mina bröder, written by Jonas Hassen Khemiri and directed by Farnaz Arbabi. The play, which explores themes of racial profiling and alienation in the wake of the 2010 Stockholm bombings, featured Nasiri as the protagonist's love interest, Valeria. Her performance received praise from Ingegärd Waaranperä of Dagens Nyheter. She also appeared in the premiere of Jonas Hassen Khemiri's play Ungefär lika med at the Royal Dramatic Theatre in Stockholm.

She played the grieving wife of a murdered fertility doctor in the third season of The Bridge (2015). From 2016 to 2017, she was a primary member of the ensemble cast of Syrror. She appeared as Harper in a 2018 stage production of Angels in America at the Royal Dramatic Theatre. She had a minor role in Quicksand (2019) as a compassionate prison guard. In 2021, she made her directorial debut with a production of De livrädda at the National Swedish Touring Theatre.

She played Maryam in Opponent, a 2023 drama written and directed by Milad Alami. Nasiri won a Guldbagge Award for Best Actress in a Leading Role for this performance. She dedicated the award to political prisoners in Iran, and had written the names of 71 of them on her upper body. Later that year, she played Polly Peachum in a Swedish-language adaptation of The Threepenny Opera. She appeared in the 11th season of The Sandhamn Murders as a new police chief in 2025.

== Acting credits ==
=== Film ===
Year	Title	Role	Notes	Ref.
2023	Opponent	Maryam		

=== Television ===
Year	Title	Role	Notes	Ref.
2015	The Bridge	Natalie		
2016–2017	Syrror	Julia		
2019	Quicksand			
2025	The Sandhamn Murders			

=== Theatre ===
Year	Title	Role	Venue	Notes	Ref.
2007	Don Juan in Soho	Lottie	Stockholm City Theatre		
2010	Kött		Backa Theatre		
2011	Yvonne, prinsessa av Burgund		Backa Theatre		
2012	Någonas heder	Zahra	—N/a	Radio play	
2012	A Dream Play		Stockholm City Theatre	Klara stage	
2012	Utopia 2012		Backa Theatre		
2013	Jag ringer mina bröder	Valeria	Stockholm City Theatre		
2014	Ungefär lika med		Royal Dramatic Theatre		
2018	Angels in America	Harper	Royal Dramatic Theatre	Main stage	
2022	Eld	Pilar	Stockholm City Theatre		
2023	The Threepenny Opera	Polly Peachum	Royal Dramatic Theatre	Main stage	

== Awards and nominations ==
Year	Award	Category	Work	Result	Ref.
2024	Guldbagge	Best Actress in a Leading Role	Opponent	Won	
