= Evin Ahmad =

Swedish actress and author (born 1990)

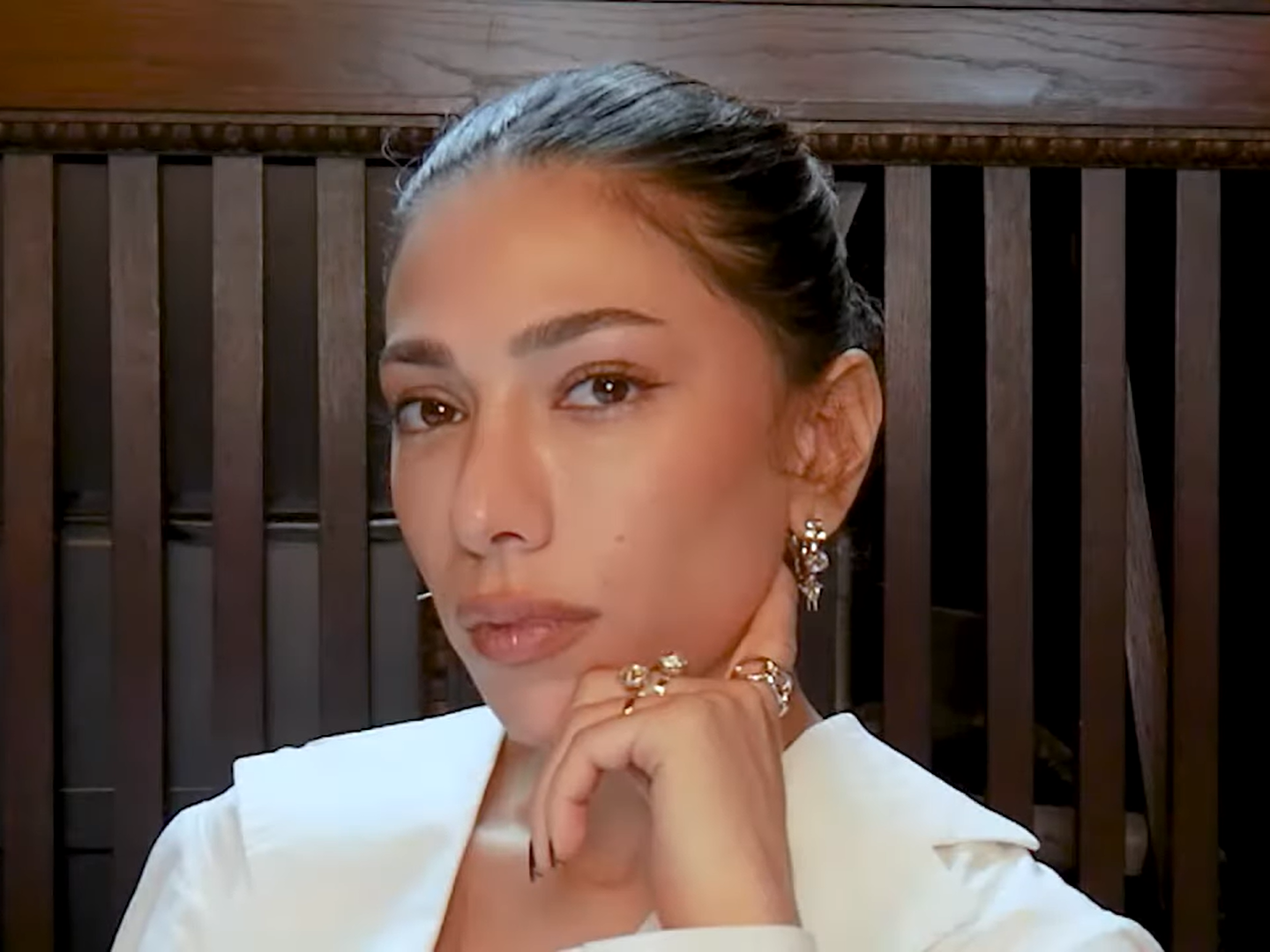
- Ahmad at the 72nd Berlin International Film Festival in 2022
- Born: 8 June 1990 (age 36); Stockholm, Sweden
- Education: Stockholm Academy of Dramatic Arts
- Occupations: Actress; author
- Years active: 2007–present
- Partner: Ardalan Esmaili
- Awards: Shooting Star Award (2022)

Evin Ahmad (born 8 June 1990) is a Swedish actress and author. She made her debut in the 2007 film adaptation of Jonas Hassen Khemiri's novel One Eye Red. After a few minor film roles, she had her breakthrough in Beyond Dreams (2017), for which she received a nomination for Guldbagge Award for Best Actress in a Leading Role. She received another nomination for Call Mom! (2019). Ahmad is also known for her performances in various Netflix television series including The Rain (2018–2020), Snabba Cash (2021–2022), and Who Is Erin Carter? (2023).

== Early life ==
Ahmad was born on 8 June 1990 in Stockholm. She grew up in the Akalla district, where she lived for 22 years. Her parents are Kurdish with her mother being from Afrin, Syria, and her father, an actor, being from Sulaymaniyah, Iraq.

== Career ==
=== Acting ===
While she was in ninth grade, she made her screen debut in the 2007 film adaptation of Jonas Hassen Khemiri's novel One Eye Red.

Ahmad studied at Stockholm Academy of Dramatic Arts. She had a small part in For Better and Worse (2015) and also did some stage plays associated with Unga Klara.

In 2017, she had her breakthrough role starring in Rojda Sekersöz's directorial debut, Beyond Dreams. Ahmad played Mirja, a young woman who returns from prison back to the suburbs where her seriously ill mother and criminal friends live. She garnered praise for her performance, and was awarded the Silver Leaf for Best Actress at the Duhok International Film Festival. She also earned a nomination for Guldbagge Award for Best Actress in a Leading Role.

She played Agnes, a young violinist, in Mending Hugo's Heart (2017). She had a minor role in the French war film Girls of the Sun (2018).

She gained recognition in 2019 for her roles in the Danish post-apocalyptic series The Rain and the Swedish crime drama Quicksand. She was again nominated for a Guldbagge for her performance as Maggie in Call Mom! (2019).

Ahmad gained wider recognition in 2021 with her portrayal of Leya, the lead character in the Netflix original series Snabba Cash. In 2022, she was awarded a Shooting Star Award by European Film Promotion. In 2023, she appeared in the third season of Face to Face, a Danish crime drama series. Later that same year, she played the lead role in the Netflix series Who Is Erin Carter?, which premiered in August 2023. It was Ahmad's first major English-language role.

=== Writing ===
In September 2017, her first book was released, En dag ska jag bygga ett slott av pengar (English: One Day I Will Build a Castle of Money).

== Personal life ==
She is in a long-term relationship with actor Ardalan Esmaili.

== Filmography ==
| Year | Title | Role | Notes |
|---|---|---|---|
| 2007 | Ett öga rött | Yasmine | |
| 2014 | Blue Eyes | Jasmine | TV series |
| 2015 | Beck - Sjukhusmorden | Sara | |
| 2015 | I nöd eller lust | Peace | |
| 2017 | Beyond Dreams | Mirja | |
| 2017 | Mending Hugo's Heart | Agnes | |
| 2018 | Girls of the Sun | Berivan | |
| 2019 | Quicksand | Evin Orak | TV series |
| 2019 | Vår tid är nu (The Restaurant) | Carmen | TV series |
| 2019 | Call Mom! | Maggie | |
| 2019 | The Rain | Kira | TV series |
| 2020 | Tsunami | Sara | TV series |
| 2021–2022 | Snabba Cash | Leya | TV series |
| 2023 | Who Is Erin Carter? | Erin Carter | TV series |
| 2023 | Face to Face | Liz | TV series |
| 2025 | Den of Thieves 2: Pantera | Jovanna | |
| 2026 | Den of Thieves 3 | Jovanna | Pre-production |

== Awards and nominations ==
| Year | Award | Category | Result | Ref. |
|---|---|---|---|---|
| 2017 | Duhok International Film Festival | Best Actress | Won | |
| 2022 | Berlin International Film Festival | EFP Shooting Star | Won | |
