= Beyond Dreams =

2017 Swedish film directed by Rojda Sekersöz

- Promotional poster
- Swedish: Dröm vidare
- Directed by: Rojda Sekersöz
- Written by: Johanna Emanuelsson
- Produced by: Agneta Fagerström; Annika Hellström
- Starring: Evin Ahmad; Gizem Erdogan; Malin Persson; Segen Tesfai; Ella Åhman; Outi Mäenpää
- Cinematography: Gabriel Mkrttchian
- Edited by: Linda Jildman; Hanna Storby
- Music by: Lisa Holmkvist
- Production company: 2afilm
- Distributed by: NonStop Entertainment; Pluto Film
- Release dates: 28 January 2017 (GFF); 17 March 2017 (Sweden)
- Running time: 90 minutes
- Country: Sweden
- Language: Swedish

Beyond Dreams (Swedish: Dröm vidare, lit. 'Dream on') is a 2017 drama film directed by Rojda Sekersöz and written by Johanna Emanuelsson. The film stars Evin Ahmad as Mirja, a young woman recently released from prison, who is torn between her lifelong friends and her struggling family. Gizem Erdogan, Malin Persson, Segen Tesfai, Outi Mäenpää, and Ella Åhman appear in supporting roles. Agneta Fagerström and Annika Hellström produced Beyond Dreams through their company, 2afilm, with financial support from Filmpool Nord, STHLM Debut, and the Swedish Film Institute.

Emanuelsson and Sekersöz, both graduates of the Stockholm Academy of Dramatic Arts, developed the film together after being approached by the producers. It served as Emanuelsson's debut as a screenwriter and Sekersöz's debut as a feature film director. Filming took place during the summer of 2016 in Alby, Botkyrka (the film's setting) and in Luleå. It was described by the creators as a political work that explored themes of friendship, loyalty, and identity. The film has also been analysed as a commentary on caregiving and motherhood within the Swedish welfare state.

It premiered on 28 January 2017 at the Gothenburg Film Festival, before a theatrical release in Sweden on 17 March. In addition to opening the Lübeck Nordic Film Days festival on 1 November, it was also screened at Berlin Feminist Film Week and at TIFF Next Wave in Toronto the following year. The film received generally positive reviews from critics, with particular praise for the direction, writing, and the cast's performances, especially Ahmad's. Beyond Dreams was listed as one of the ten best Swedish films of 2017 by film editors at Dagens Nyheter. It won several awards, including the Church of Sweden's Film Prize, the Audience Dragon Award for Best Nordic Film, and the FIPRESCI Prize at the Norwegian International Film Festival. Sekersöz earned a Guldbagge Newcomer Award for her work on the film. Ahmad and Erdogan were both recognized with Guldbagge nominations, for Best Actress in a Leading Role and Best Actress in a Supporting Role, respectively.

== Plot ==
After being released from prison, Mirja is greeted by younger half-sister Isa and her close-knit group of friends: Sarah, Emmy, and Nina. Mirja was jailed after being caught in the group's failed robbery, a plan hatched so they can move to Montevideo. The group plots another heist, this time targeting a jewellery store. Mirja moves back home and clashes with her mother Sirkka, who gives her an ultimatum to sort out her life. Despite the planned robbery, Mirja secretly looks for legitimate work. Frustrated by bureaucratic red tape at the employment assistance centre, she approaches hotel owner Paul Lilja directly, who offers her a trial job washing dishes. Mirja discovers a letter revealing Sirkka has advanced COPD.

After a promising start in the kitchen, Paul offers Mirja a permanent position in room service. The job offers higher pay, but he wants to pay her under the table. She accepts, begins working with Edit, a veteran housekeeper who teaches Mirja to take pride in her work. Mirja's friends show up to the hotel to confront her. Sarah mocks her for cleaning up after rich people, and the two nearly get into a physical fight.

Once Sirkka is admitted to the hospital, Mirja has no choice but to covertly bring Isa to work with her. On impulse, Mirja applies a guest's false eyelashes. Unbeknownst to her, Isa also steals an expensive watch. The guest returns unexpectedly and sees Mirja wearing her eyelashes. Paul fires Mirja and refuses to pay her for the last several days of work. At home, Sirkka finds the watch and assumes Mirja stole it, culminating in a violent argument where Sirkka kicks Mirja out of the house.

Desperate and now homeless, Mirja confronts Paul, returning the watch and again pleading for her job back. He refuses; she attacks him. After crossing paths with Edit, who feels betrayed, Mirja leaves for good. She sees her old friends partying and crashes their night out, getting belligerently drunk. Sarah intervenes, and the group lets her stay with them to sleep off her hangover. They pressure her to decide if she will participate in the jewellery store heist. Mirja agrees, but backs out the last minute as she sees Isa walking alone at night. Isa reveals Sirkka has been re-admitted to the hospital. They go to her, but Sirkka dies. Setting aside their recent conflicts, Mirja's friends support her at the funeral. Afterwards, Mirja breaks down in tears, as Isa and her friends comfort her.

Despite Mirja not following through with the heist, Sarah surprises her with tickets to Montevideo, for both her and Isa. Mirja declines, choosing to stay and care for her sister and stating she does not want to run from her past. The two end on good terms. In the final scene, Mirja and Isa enjoy each other's company on a rooftop.

== Cast ==
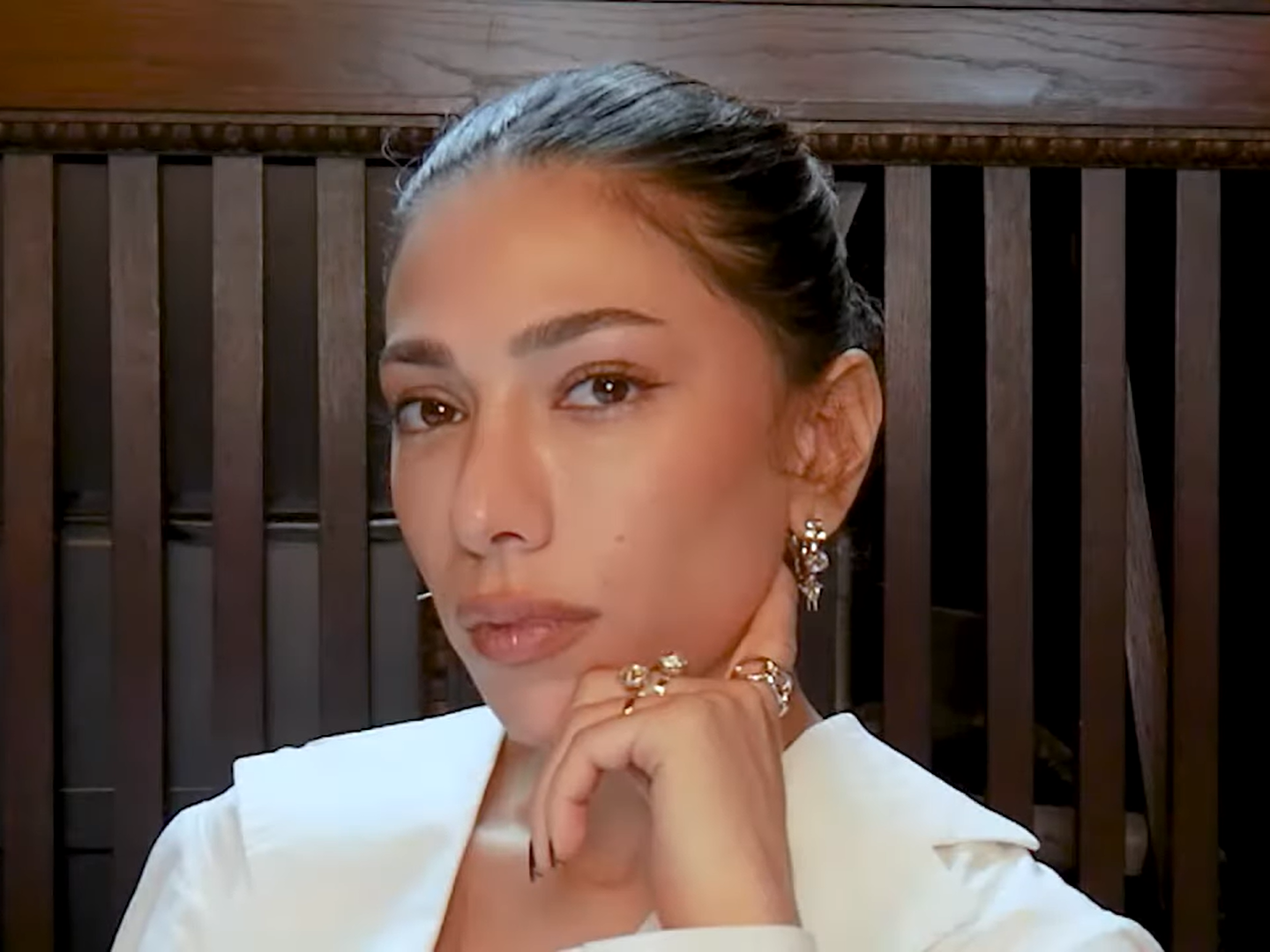
Evin Ahmad played the film's protagonist, Mirja.

- Evin Ahmad as Mirja: a young woman recently released from prison
- Gizem Erdogan as Sarah: Mirja's friend
- Malin Persson as Emmy: Mirja's friend
- Segen Tesfai as Nina: Mirja's friend
- Ella Åhman as Isa: Mirja's younger half-sister and an aspiring social media influencer
- Outi Mäenpää as Sirkka: Mirja and Isa's mother with advanced COPD
- Anna Bjelkerud as Edit: Mirja's room service coworker at the hotel
- Michael Lindgren as Paul Lilja: a hotel owner and Mirja's supervisor

== Production ==
=== Development ===
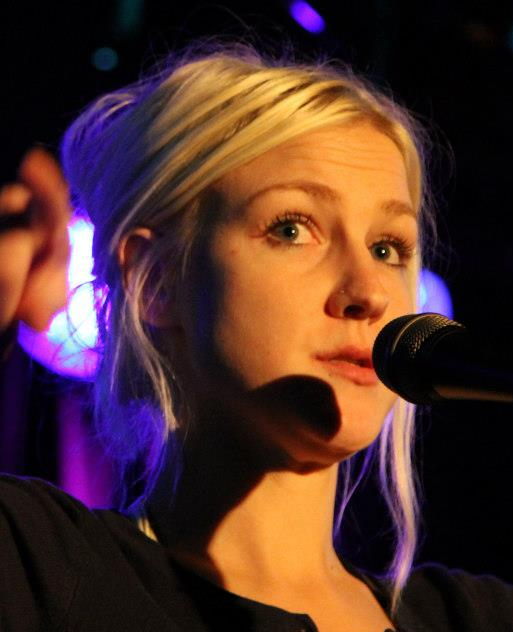
Johanna Emanuelsson made her debut as a feature film screenwriter with Beyond Dreams.

Beyond Dreams was produced through 2afilm, a company co-founded by Agneta Fagerström and Annika Hellström, which had first produced Flocking (2015). For their second feature film, Fagerström and Hellström approached screenwriter Johanna Emanuelsson, who suggested Rojda Sekersöz as director. The duo then began working on ideas. In an interview with Nordic Women in Film, Fagerström said Beyond Dreams was inspired by La Haine (1995), but with women in the lead roles. La Haine follows the sons of North African immigrants navigating alienation and violence in a Parisian suburb, and was released as Medan vi faller (lit. 'While we fall') in Sweden on 1 March 1996. Sekersöz and Emanuelsson knew each other through being members of the Revolutionary Communist Youth, and both previously received the Communist Cultural Scholarship — Emanuelsson in 2009 and Sekersöz in 2014. They also both graduated from the Stockholm Academy of Dramatic Arts. Beyond Dreams served as Sekersöz's debut as a feature film director and Emanuelsson's debut as a screenwriter. Sekersöz previously worked with lead actress Evin Ahmad before she was cast in Beyond Dreams. The project was announced in 2016 as a "coming-of-age film about adult women", with support from Filmpool Nord and STHLM Debut. The budget was 10.2 million SEK, with Fagerström characterising the film as a low-budget project. 4.5 million SEK of funding came from the Swedish Film Institute.

=== Filming, post-production, and music ===
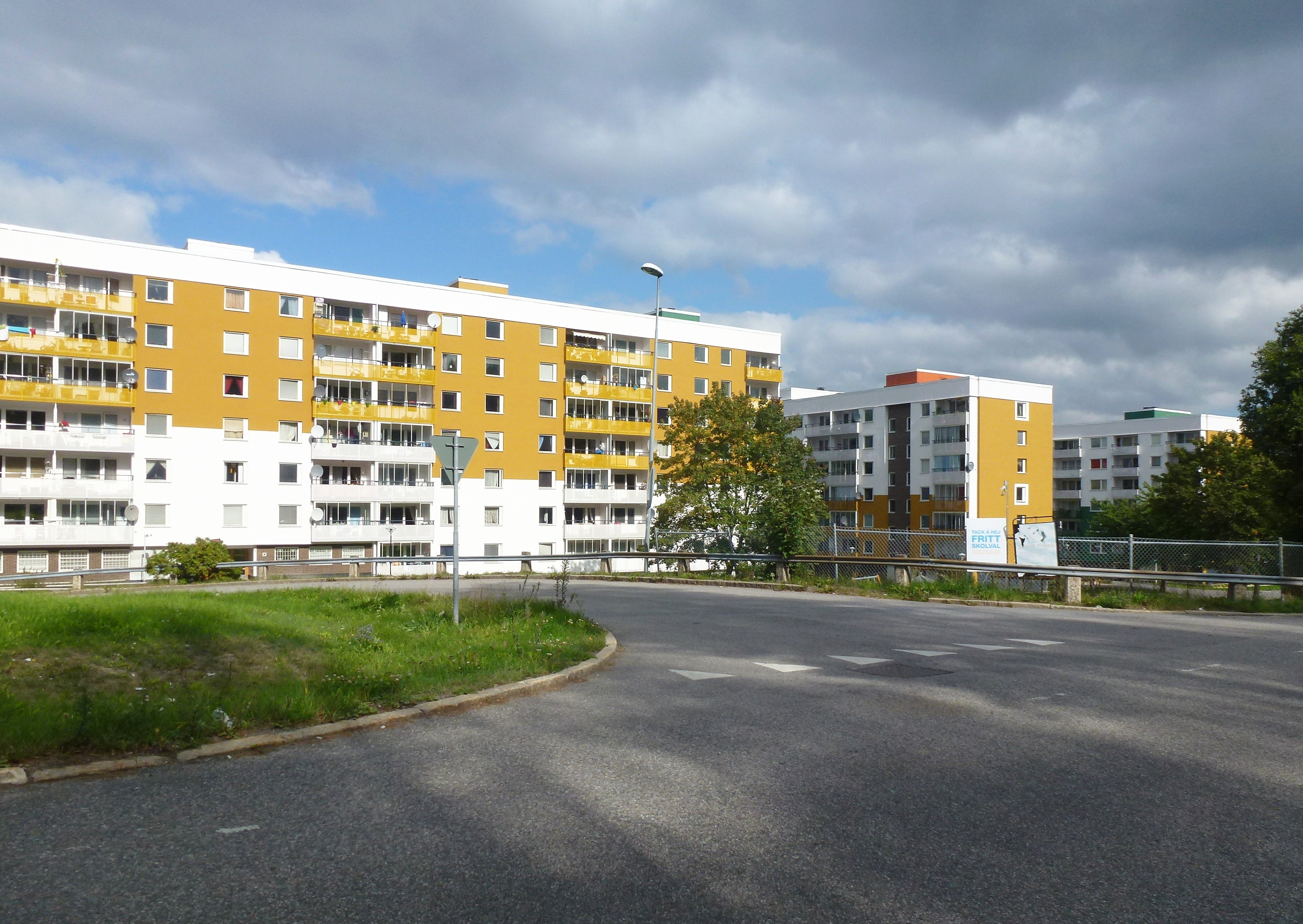
Million Programme public housing in Alby, Botkyrka, representative of the Swedish suburban setting of Beyond Dreams.

The film was set in Alby, Botkyrka; it was filmed both there and in Luleå, for 10 and 22 days, respectively, during the summer of 2016. Some scenes were shot at the Luleå Stadshotell. While filming at the hotel, a fog machine associated with the production triggered a fire alarm, but the fire brigade was not needed. Gabriel Mkrttchian served as the director of photography. Linda Jildman and Hanna Storby edited the film. Lisa Holmkvist, who had previously won a Guldbagge for Best Original Score for her work on Flocking, composed the score. The soundtrack also featured "Easy" by Seinabo Sey, as well as two songs by Melina Florides: "This Time" and "If It Takes Two".

== Themes ==
Beyond Dreams was noted by several film critics for its focus on female friendship. An initial press release described the crux of the film as Mirja having to decide where her loyalty lies: with her sick mother and sister, or with her lifelong friends. Sekersöz identified themes of friendship, loyalty, and identity. Both Sekersöz and Emanuelsson characterised it as a political film. In an interview with the communist newspaper Proletären, they said their work was intended to question the idea that people can succeed simply through their own willpower, without interference from other systemic factors. This perspective was criticised by Carolin Dahlman in Kristianstadsbladet, a liberal regional newspaper. Arguing that poverty should not be used as an excuse for criminal behaviour, she criticised the film's sympathetic treatment of Mirja's return to planning a robbery and its implied contrast between bureaucratic obstacles with the perceived simplicity of robbery. She contended that individuals must be responsible for their own actions regardless of social background.

The film's themes have also been discussed by scholars. In a chapter of the anthology Media Work, Mothers and Motherhood, Maria Jansson and Louise Wallenberg analysed the messages of Beyond Dreams, focusing on how once Mirja becomes responsible for taking care of Isa due to Sirkka's hospitalisation, she begins to face new problems that ultimately culminate in her losing her job. They concluded the film "challenges the notion that the conflict between mothering and care has been solved by the welfare state." Jansson and Malte Breiding Hansen noted parallels between Beyond Dreams and Summer Paradise, a Swedish film from 1977 about two older women and longtime friends who confront differing views on family and social responsibility during a summer house stay. In a comparative analysis of media response to the two films, they argued that the differing reception illustrates a broader shift in how women's relationship to the Swedish welfare state has developed in the 40 years between the films' releases. They noted that debates around Summer Paradise framed childcare and caregiving as collective, gendered responsibilities tied to structural inequalities, with the welfare state viewed as a possible, albeit flawed, solution. By contrast, discussions of Beyond Dreams tended to focus on Mirja's capacity to provide for herself within existing social structures. Hansen and Jansson concluded that this shift reflects the growing influence of neoliberal discourse, which has reframed women's political agency from a communal struggle towards an ideal of self-sufficiency.

== Release ==
The film premiered on 28 January 2017 at the Gothenburg Film Festival, before its Swedish theatrical release on 17 March. The distributor for the Swedish release was NonStop Entertainment. It also had a premiere in Germany, opening the Lübeck Nordic Film Days festival on 1 November. Pluto Film managed global distribution. In 2018, Beyond Dreams was screened at Berlin Feminist Film Week and at TIFF Next Wave in Toronto.

== Reception ==
=== Critical response ===
On the Swedish review aggregator website Kritiker, the film earned an average rating of 4.0/5 based on 15 critics' reviews. Dagens Nyheter film editors Helena Lindblad and Nicholas Wennö described Beyond Dreams as the fifth best Swedish film of 2017. Sydsvenskan critic Malin Krutmeijer also listed it as among the best films of the year.

Sekersöz's direction was positively received by critics. In a review for Dagens Nyheter, Lindblad praised it as a "brilliant debut film" (lysande debutfilm) which offered a nuanced depiction of female friendships and caregiving. Mia Gerdin of Sveriges Radio commended both the direction and Emanuelsson's script. Other reviewers critiqued the storytelling. Kristoffer Viita of SVT Nyheter felt the pacing of Beyond Dreams suffered somewhat from an overextended plot. He also critiqued the lack of development for Mirja's friends, but credited Sekersöz's attention to detail for elevating the film. In a somewhat mixed review for Svenska Dagbladet, Karoline Eriksson criticised certain plot twists as overly simplistic, but praised the narrative focus on young women from immigrant backgrounds without highlighting gender issues, boyfriends, or abuse.

Ahmad's performance was praised by critics. Lindblad wrote that her portrayal of the central "brash but vulnerable dandelion child" (kaxiga men också sårbara maskrosbarn) served as the true heart of the film; Aftonbladet later described Mirja as her definitive breakthrough role. Supporting cast members also received critical attention. Gizem Erdogan's depiction of Mirja's scorned best friend Sarah was highlighted by Eriksson, and Anna Bjelkerud's performance as the hardworking hotel housekeeper Edit was singled out by several reviewers as a standout. Viita wrote that Ella Åhman's portrayal of Mirja's Instagram model-obsessed sister was both tragicomic and entertaining, but he took issue with the depiction of Mirja's mother, which he felt was reduced to a stereotype of Finnish "white trash".

=== Accolades ===
The film won the Church of Sweden's Film Prize, the Audience Dragon Award for Best Nordic Film, and the FIPRESCI Prize at the Norwegian International Film Festival. At the Kurdish film festival, Duhok, it won the Golden Leaf for Best Film, while Ahmad won the Silver Leaf for Best Actress. Sekersöz won the Guldbagge Newcomer Award for directing Beyond Dreams. She was also awarded a 30,000 SEK cultural scholarship from the Botkyrka Municipality, for "[giving] voices to the women of the Million Programme" (ger en röst till miljonprogrammens kvinnor). Ahmad and Erdogan both earned Guldbagge nominations, for Best Actress in a Leading Role and Best Actress in a Supporting Role, respectively.

== See also ==
- Welfare in Sweden
- List of Swedish films of the 2010s
