= Ardalan Esmaili =

Swedish actor (born 1986)

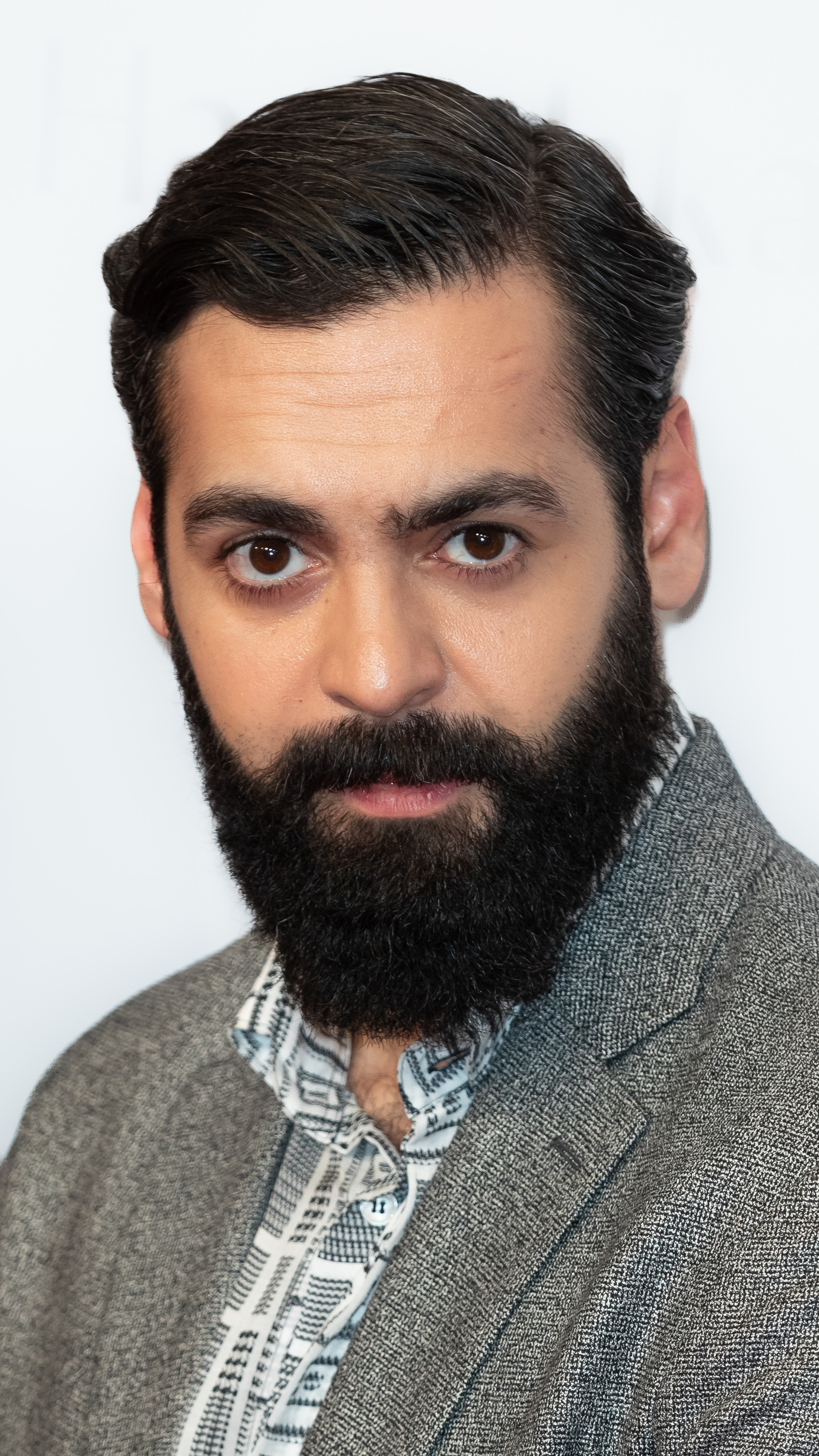
- Esmaili in 2019
- Born: 22 March 1986 (age 40); Tehran, Iran
- Education: Swedish National Academy of Mime and Acting
- Occupation: Actor
- Years active: 2007–present
- Partner: Evin Ahmad

Ardalan Esmaili (born 22 March 1986) is a Swedish actor.

== Biography ==
Esmaili was born in Tehran, Iran, to an architect father and a teacher mother. Toward the end of the Iran–Iraq War, when Esmaili was two years old, his family moved to Sweden. Esmaili stated, "My parents were afraid that my older brother might eventually be drafted into the military. They saw no future for the children in Iran." The family originally planned to move to the United States, but instead settled in Skellefteå, where Esmaili would grow up.

Esmaili attended junior high school in Malå. While attending folk high school at Fridhems Folkhögskola in Svalöv, he held an internship at Film i Västerbotten with Milad Alami, a family friend. After high school, he attended the Swedish National Academy of Mime and Acting.

In addition to Swedish, he speaks Persian, English, and Danish. He is in a long-term relationship with actress Evin Ahmad.

== Filmography ==
=== Film ===
Year	Title	Role	Notes	Ref.
2007	Ett-Två-Tre Martyr!	Son	Short film	
2016	Trespassers	Ali	Short film	
2016	The Girl, the Mother and the Demons	Demon Deinar		
2017	The Charmer	Esmail		
2018	Greyzone	Iyad Adi Kassar		
2019	Domino	Omar		
2019	Daniel	Majeed		
2019	Sea Fever	Omid		
2022	Black Crab	Karimi		
2023	Opponent	Abbas		
2023	A Beautiful Life	Patrick		

=== Television ===
Year	Title	Role	Notes	Ref.
2012	Alex	Ivan	TV movie	
2016	Beck	Amir Ghanbari	1 episode	
2017–20	Rebecka Martinsson	Tommy Rantakyrö	16 episodes	
2018	Den döende detektiven	Joseph Ermegan	2 episodes	
2020	The Rain	Uncle	2 episodes	
2020	Alfa	Ibrahim	4 episodes	
2020	White Wall	Said	6 episodes	
2021	Snöänglar	Salle	6 episodes	
2022	Snabba Cash	Jamal	6 episodes	
2023	Codename: Annika	Rasmus Ståhlgren	6 episodes	
2024	Deliver Me	Farid	5 episodes	
2024	The Helicopter Heist	Michel Maloof	8 episodes	
2025	Lockerbie: A Search for Truth	Abdelbaset al-Megrahi	5 episodes	

== Awards and nominations ==
Year	Award	Category	Result	Ref.
2019	Berlin International Film Festival	EFP Shooting Star	Won	
