= Pennskaftet =

Novel by Elin Wägner

- Author: Elin Wägner
- Language: Swedish
- Publication date: 1910
- Publication place: Sweden

Pennskaftet (English: "Penholder") is a 1910 novel by the Swedish writer Elin Wägner.

== Plot ==
The title character is the female reporter Barbro Magnus ("Penholder") who becomes a sympathiser with the campaign for women's suffrage in Sweden. She falls in love with the young architect Dick Block, and the couple defies contemporary social norms by living together without being married. She also becomes acquainted with the school teacher Cecilia Bech, who finds meaning in her life in the campaign for suffrage.

== Context ==
At the time of the novel's publication, women had already made a mark in the profession of journalism in Sweden, and Elin Wägner herself was employed as a reporter from 1908. It was also a period of intense campaign for women's suffrage, the struggle having organized with the foundation of the Landsföreningen för kvinnans politiska rösträtt in 1902, a struggle that was not to succeed until 1919. Finally, intellectual circles in Sweden participated in the ongoing Nordic sexual morality debate, and the debate included free love and the right to have a love relationship without a wedding ceremony, which was supported by Ellen Key, among others.

== Reception ==
The novel was a great success when it was published in Denmark in 1911, Russia in 1912 and Germany in 1916. Ellen Key described the novel as brave and alive, although she thought the love story was neglected in favor of the suffrage theme, and Gertrud Almqvist-Brogren praised it for the theme of free love: "The novel will make it clear to more than one, that it is the truth, a woman's toward oneself and others, that will save purity" rather than a marriage certificate. Else Kleen of Gefle Dagblad praised the novel as "the first really literary and truthful novel of women's emancipation in Sweden". The novel did not only meet praise, however. Fredrik Böök and Bo Bergman both agreed that the literary quality was neglected in favor of its political agenda, and the suffragist Ann Margret Holmgren was concerned that the radical and controversial free love theme would damage the campaign for women's suffrage.

Horace Engdahl has described the novel as the first Swedish emancipation novel about the "New Woman", a novel describing the emancipation of women in both political, economical and sexual context, a type of novel that had become fashionable in Britain in the 1890s and was a part of the ongoing debate of women's emancipation.

Helena Forsås-Scott has referred to the novel as the "First Swedish Suffrage Novel" and said that it is a truthful depiction of the women's suffrage campaign as it looked in Sweden at the time of its publication.

== Play adaptation ==
Pennskaftet was adapted into a play by Johanna Emanuelsson which premiered in 2019 at the Uppsala City Theater.

== See also ==
- 1910 in literature
- Swedish literature
