= Bloody Awful in Different Ways =

2023 novel by Andrev Walden

- Author: Andrev Walden
- Audio read by: Cameron Krogh Stone
- Original title: Jävla karlar
- Translator: Ian Giles
- Cover artist: Jesper Waldersten
- Language: Swedish
- Subject: Childhood, Relationships
- Genre: Novel, Literary fiction
- Set in: Norrköping, Stockholm
- Published: 2023
- Publisher: Bokförlaget Polaris, Fig Tree (Penguin Books)
- Publication place: United Kingdom
- English publication date: 2025
- Media type: Print, E-book, Audio
- Pages: 341
- Awards: August Prize 2023 (Fiction)
- ISBN: 9780241720288
- OCLC: 1492393194

Bloody Awful in Different Ways (Swedish: Jävla karlar, lit. 'Bloody Men') is a 2023 novel by Swedish author Andrev Walden. The book was the winner of the 2023 August Prize in the Fiction category. The novel was translated from Swedish into English by Ian Giles and published by Fig Tree.

The original Swedish version was published by Bokförlaget Polaris and contained 376 pages.

In November 2024, B-Reel Films acquired the film and TV rights to the book. The following May, it was announced that Aliette Opheim and Filip Berg would star in the adaptation, with direction by Jens Sjögren.
