= Toby Sebastian =

British actor

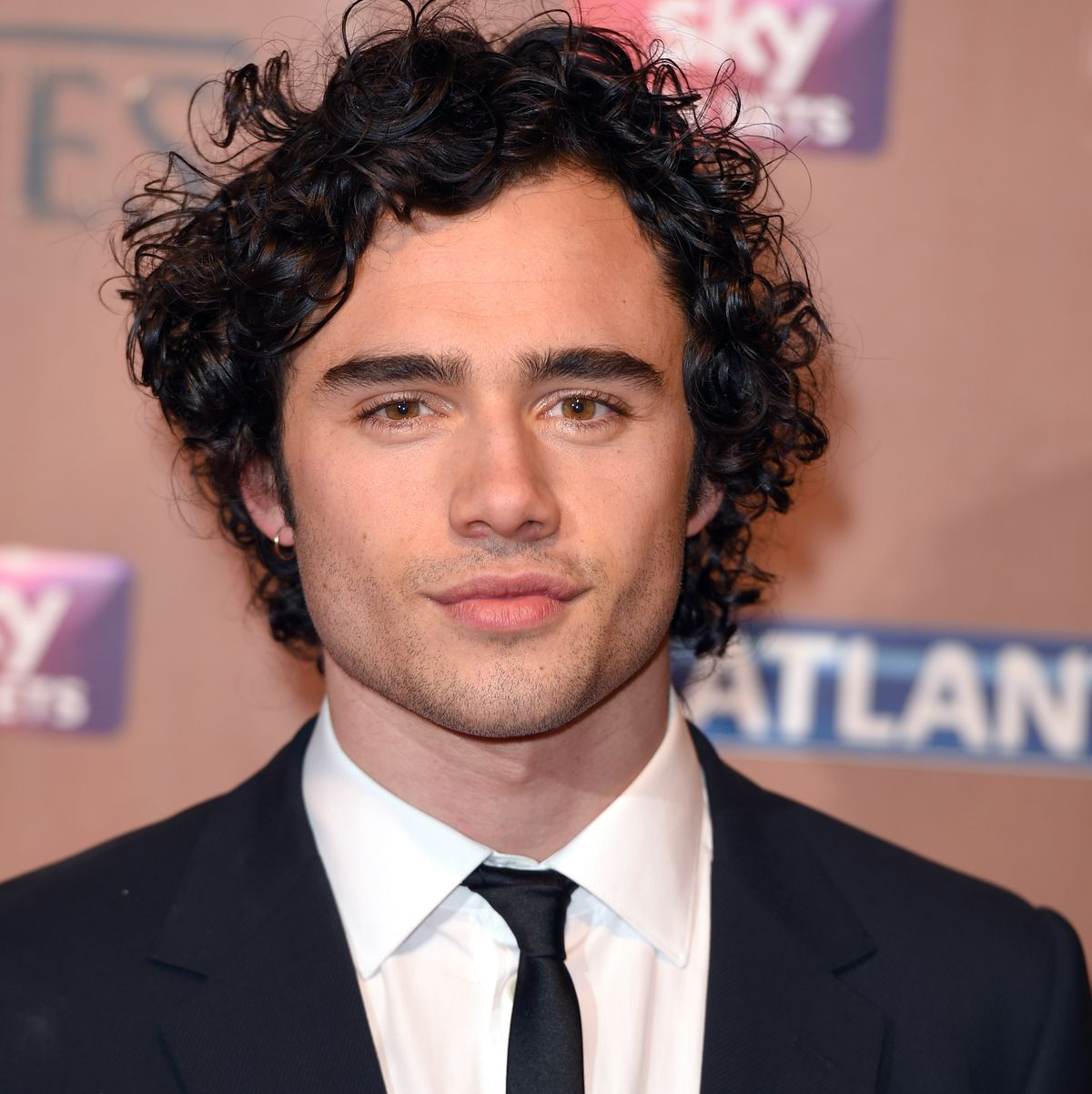
- Sebastian in 2015
- Born: Sebastian Toby M. Pugh; 26 February 1992 (age 34); Oxford, England
- Occupations: Actor; musician
- Years active: 2008–present
- Children: 1
- Relatives: Florence Pugh (sister)

Sebastian Toby M. Pugh (born 26 February 1992), known professionally as Toby Sebastian, is an English actor and musician. He is best known for portraying the character of Trystane Martell in the HBO series Game of Thrones, and Andrea Bocelli in the biopic The Music of Silence.

== Early life ==
Sebastian was born in Oxford, England and spent a part of his childhood in Andalusia, Spain, seeking a climate beneficial to sister Florence's health. During this time, Sebastian learned to play the guitar from a flamenco teacher. He later attended Cokethorpe School in Oxfordshire.

== Career ==
Sebastian first appeared on TV as a contestant on Orange unsignedAct in 2008. Following the show, he left school for a record deal with A&M records where he moved to Los Angeles and Nashville to record his debut album with country producer Chris Lindsey.

In 2012, he appeared in his first acting role in the film, After the Dark. He also appeared in The Red Tent as Re-mose, and in Barely Lethal (alongside Hailee Steinfeld, Sophie Turner and Thomas Mann) as Cash Fenton. In the same film, Sebastian contributed five original songs to the soundtrack.

In 2015, Sebastian was cast in the fifth season of Game of Thrones as Trystane Martell.

Sebastian played Andrea Bocelli in the biopic The Music of Silence, alongside Antonio Banderas and Jordi Mollà directed by the Academy Award nominated director Michael Radford.

In 2017, Sebastian starred in Trading Paint, a sports film starring John Travolta, Michael Madsen and Shania Twain, directed by Karzan Kader. In 2023, Sebastian starred as Rudy in the comedy film Coffee Wars. 2024 saw him as Andre Agassi in the Amazon Prime series Perfect Match, a fictional retelling of Agassi and Steffi Graf's love story.

== Filmography ==
=== Film ===
| Year | Title | Role | Notes |
|---|---|---|---|
| 2013 | After the Dark | Russell | |
| 2015 | Barely Lethal | Cash Fenton | |
| 2016 | Music, War and Love | Vlad Dagmarov | |
| 2016 | Alex & Co: How to Grow Up Despite Your Parents | Pat Riley | |
| 2017 | The Music of Silence | Amos Bardi (Andrea Bocelli) | also producer |
| 2019 | Trading Paint | Cam | |
| 2023 | Coffee Wars | Rudy | |
| 2024 | Perfect Match | Andre Agassi | |

=== Television ===
| Year | Title | Role | Notes |
|---|---|---|---|
| 2008 | Orange unsignedAct | Self (music) | |
| 2012 | The Hollow Crown | Rebel Soldier | |
| 2014 | The Red Tent | Re-Mose | |
| 2015–2016 | Game of Thrones | Trystane Martell | |
| 2017 | All You Need Is Me | Johnny | |

== Discography ==
=== Albums ===
| | Title |
|---|---|
| 2013 | Into the Light |
| 2025 | Eyes Light Up |

=== EPs ===
| | Title |
|---|---|
| 2019 | Hamliar |

=== Singles ===
| | Title |
|---|---|
| 2019 | "No Money" |
| 2019 | "Train to Mexico" |
| 2020 | "Number One Lover" |
| 2020 | "Toothpaste Kisses" |
| 2021 | "Midnight" (feat. Florence Pugh) |
| 2021 | "Sitting On the Water" |
| 2022 | "Real Kicks" |
