= The Home (2025 Swedish film) =

Film by Mattias Johansson Skoglund

- Directed by: Mattias Johansson Skoglund
- Screenplay by: Mattias Johansson Skoglund; Mats Strandberg
- Based on: Hemmet by Mats Strandberg
- Produced by: Siri Hjorton Wagner
- Starring: Philip Oros; Gizem Erdogan; Anki Lidén
- Cinematography: Malin LQ
- Edited by: Linda Jildmalm
- Music by: Tóti Guðnason
- Production company: [sic] film AB
- Distributed by: NonStop Entertainment
- Release dates: 10 March 2025 (SXSW Film Festival); 29 October 2025 (Sweden)
- Countries: Estonia; Iceland; Sweden
- Language: Swedish

The Home, also known as Hemmet, is a 2025 Swedish horror film directed by Mattias Johansson Skoglund and written by Skoglund and Mats Strandberg. It is based on Strandberg's novel of the same name and stars Philip Oros, Gizem Erdogan and Anki Lidén.

== Premise ==
Following a stroke, an elderly woman moves into a care facility, bringing with her an entity that latched on during the moments she was clinically dead.

== Cast ==
- Philip Oros as Joel
- Gizem Erdogan as Nina
- Anki Lidén as Monika, Joel's mother
- Malin Levanon as Elisabeth
- Lily Wahlsteen as Olivia

== Production ==
The film is based on Strandberg's 2017 novel of the same name.

== Release ==
The Home premiered at SXSW Film Festival on March 10, 2025. In Sweden, NonStop Entertainment distributed the film on 100 screens on 29 October 2025. In November 2025, the film was acquired by Uncork'd Entertainment for distribution in the United States, by Cinemaran for Latin America and Spain, and by Moon Shot Company for Poland.

== Reception ==
Variety wrote "Its eerily quiet approach to a fantastical story casts a spell of greater potency than many bigger, louder possession tales stocked with frightful effects and other hyperbolic elements."

Dread Central said "The Home may feel familiar in its themes of familial trauma, but a smart script and stellar central performance help the film stand apart."

Film critic Alexandra Heller-Nicholas wrote "The Home is a challenging, tragic film that never surrenders to cliche or easy ethical binaries, and one that grants dementia a serious, considered focus, albeit told through the lens of supernatural fantasy."
