= Black Crab (film) =

2022 Swedish film

- Release poster
- Swedish: Svart Krabba
- Directed by: Adam Berg
- Written by: Adam Berg; Pelle Rådström
- Based on: Svart Krabba by Jerker Virdborg
- Produced by: Malin Idevall; Mattias Montero
- Starring: Noomi Rapace
- Cinematography: Jonas Alarik
- Edited by: Kristoffer Nordin
- Music by: Dead People
- Production company: Indio
- Distributed by: Netflix
- Release date: 18 March 2022
- Running time: 114 minutes
- Country: Sweden
- Language: Swedish

Black Crab (Swedish: Svart Krabba) is a 2022 Swedish action thriller film directed by Adam Berg. Based on the 2002 novel Svart krabba by Jerker Virdborg, the screenplay was written by Berg and Pelle Rådström. The film stars Noomi Rapace as Caroline Edh, a speed skater who is conscripted to join a team of soldiers for a dangerous mission to skate across sea ice behind enemy lines. The team is tasked with delivering a secret package to an island research base, which they are told could end the war. Jakob Oftebro, Erik Enge, Dar Salim, Ardalan Esmaili, Aliette Opheim, David Dencik, Susan Taslimi, and Stella Marcimain Klintberg appear in supporting roles. The film was released on 18 March 2022 by Netflix.

== Plot ==
The film opens with a flashback scene in which Edh is in a car with her daughter, Vanja, waiting in a traffic jam. Civilians are attacked by approaching enemies and the pair are forced out of the car.

A few years later Edh, now a soldier, is disembarking from a train. A lieutenant drives her to the base through a dangerous neighborhood and strands her there. Edh is attacked by refugees, and manages to fight her way out. Upon arriving at the base, she is taken for a briefing with Colonel Raad and she meets the other soldiers recruited for the special mission: Karimi, an inexperienced signals specialist; Malik, a seasoned danish soldier; Granvik, a norwegian sniper; and Captain Forsberg.

The Colonel explains that the team must cross the ice-covered Stockholm Archipelago on skates and deliver some canisters to a research base, named Ödö, which he says could lead to victory in the war. Edh points out that this appears to be a suicide mission, but she is given a reason to try to make it: the chance to be reunited with Vanja, who has been found in a refugee camp.

The team leaves as the base is attacked the next day, and is joined by the lieutenant who abandoned Edh earlier, Nylund. Forsberg falls through the thin ice and drowns. Edh jumps in after her, saving the two packages from Forsberg’s backpack but leaving her body behind.

The group takes Edh to a house on land, where they warm her and themselves by a fire and Nylund is selected to be their new commander, according to the chain of command, though Edh disagrees.

The following morning, Edh hears the thrum of rotors and she catches Karimi using the radio. The helicopter fires a missile into the house as the team escapes, leading to the suspicion that Karimi is a traitor. He claims he was calling his girlfriend, a radio operator at the F28 base, bombed when Karimi was making his way to it.

Later, the group finds it difficult to skate across the thin ice and decides to travel over land. They find an elderly couple hiding in a home, having refused to leave during the evacuation. As they eat, Edh spots a machine pistol mounted under the table, and she silently pleads with the man not to attack. He nevertheless fires, and the soldiers return fire, leaving Karimi and the couple dead. Malik, injured, downplays the severity of his wound. As they prepare to leave, a voice claiming to be Karimi’s girlfriend from the F28 base radios in and asks to talk to him. They answer evasively and ultimately close the connection.

While resting on a ship they find frozen in the ice, Granvik opens the packages, which contain vials of liquid with a biohazard warning, suggesting they could be some sort of biological weapon. This leads to a crisis of conscience amongst the team. As Malik slowly dies from his injuries, he insists that the virus would not be the end of the war, but instead the end of everything. He shoots himself in the head.

After spotting lights on the ice, which could be enemy forces, Edh leaves alone to continue the mission with the vials. She comes across dangerously thin ice and attempts to skate across, but it cracks and leaves her stranded. Granvik and Nylund rescue her with a rope before all three attempt to cross. Granvik shoots a lone machine gunner in a pillbox on a rocky hill overlooking the ice, before the trio comes across the latter's comrades, frozen to death.

Granvik recounts why he enlisted in the military: after being forced by the enemy to dig a mass grave with his childhood friend, he fell in as his friend was shot and the enemy soldiers did not realize he was still alive. Forced to push his way out from under the corpses, he witnessed them being eaten by rats and enlisted soon after.

The next morning, awoken by memories of her daughter, Edh realises Nylund has run off with the capsules. She and Granvik are attacked by a group of enemy soldiers. The two kill them all, but Edh is shot and Granvik is killed. Edh continues her journey on the ice, catching up to Nylund who reveals he is now abandoning the mission and is instead intent on destroying the capsules. Edh shoots him and recovers the capsules. She leaves Nylund on the ice, but soon experiences visions of Malik and Forsberg before collapsing on the ice as some soldiers arrive on horseback.

She awakes in an infirmary with frostbite to her extremities. She finds out that she has reached her objective, the military base. Edh is congratulated, awarded medals, and promoted to Second Lieutenant for succeeding in the operation, by the base commander, Nordh. An injured Nylund watches with other soldiers. She asks to see her daughter, but is told that this was a ruse to increase her willpower to get the packages to the base. On learning about this, Edh attacks the commander but is restrained by Nylund, who holds her as she cries.

Edh decides to destroy the capsules and convinces Nylund to make a last-ditch effort to dispose of them. They make their way to the laboratory where the virus is being held. After forcing a scientist to give them the vials, they escape with it by triggering the evacuation alarm and hiding in hazmat suits as everyone flees.

Edh, after insisting Nylund find seats on the fleeing helicopters, is found by Nordh, and reveals that she has secured the vials to an unpinned grenade. Nordh tries to encourage to think of her daughter, Edh says that’s all she ever does, and she ends her life by stepping off the cliff and detonating the grenade. After her fall in the sea, the dead Edh reunites with her dead daughter underwater and they embrace each other.

== Cast ==
- Noomi Rapace as Caroline Edh
- Jakob Oftebro as Nylund
- Erik Enge as Granvik
- Dar Salim as Malik
- Ardalan Esmaili as Karimi
- Aliette Opheim as Forsberg
- David Dencik as Colonel Raad
- Susan Taslimi as Admiral Nordh
- Stella Marcimain Klintberg as Vanja

== Critical response ==
Professional ratings
Aggregate scores
Source	Rating
Metacritic	52/100
Rotten Tomatoes	50%
Review scores
Source	Rating
Empire	2/5 stars
The Guardian	2/5 stars
IGN	6/10
RogerEbert.com	3/5 stars

On the review aggregator website Rotten Tomatoes, 50% of 28 critics' reviews are positive, with an average rating of 5.70/10. The critics' consensus reads: "Black Crab can be exciting in the moment, but its bleak and derivative story add up to a fairly forgettable viewing experience." Charles Bramesco, for The Guardian, wrote that "in narrowing focus to the plight of speed skater Caroline Edh (Noomi Rapace), director Adam Berg and his co-writers (Jerker Virdborg, author of the source novel, and Pelle Rådström) give themselves enough room to wriggle out of the most difficult questions their premise poses. [...] Thin ice has rules and terrors all its own, however, maximized through Berg’s suspense-forward direction. [...] A pacifist parable taking a brave stand against nothing, totally removed from the sociocultural landscape of today’s Sweden, it sounds out like one of Caroline’s screams into the howling Scandinavian wind – impassioned, futile, heard by no one".

Matt Fowler, for IGN, highlighted that "Black Crab displays many of the lovely tropes associated with a ragtag quest story, including the systematic elimination of players on the board, with each victim falling as the film highlights the various hazards and obstacles in their way across the enemy-occupied ice. [...] Black Crab has all the ingredients to grab you and take you on a thrill ride – and at times it achieves this – but it suffers partial collapse by the end because of its need to land a little loftier than necessary. Noomi Rapace is powerful throughout, as a desperate soldier skating for her family, and the camera work out on the desolate, ominous expanses of ice is often gorgeous, but the film never lets us in on what's actually going on in the world and that lessens the impact of the final act".
