= The Charmer (2017 film) =

2017 Danish drama film

- Film poster
- Danish: Charmøren
- Directed by: Milad Alami
- Starring: Ardalan Esmaili; Soho Rezanejad
- Production companies: Uma Film; Garagefilm International
- Release date: 22 September 2017 (SSIFF)
- Running time: 100 minutes
- Country: Denmark
- Languages: Danish; Persian; English

The Charmer (Danish: Charmøren) is a 2017 Danish drama film directed by Milad Alami.

== Cast ==
- Ardalan Esmaili as Esmail
- Soho Rezanejad as Sara
- Susan Taslimi as Leila
- Lars Brygmann as Lars
- Elmira Arikan as Woman in Iran
- Hassan El Sayed as Amir
- Stine Fischer Christensen as Johanne
- Amalie Lindegård as Liv
