= Opponent (film) =

2023 Swedish-Norwegian drama film

- Promotional release poster
- Swedish: Motståndaren
- Directed by: Milad Alami
- Written by: Milad Alami
- Produced by: Annika Rogell
- Starring: Payman Maadi; Marall Nasiri; Björn Elgerd
- Cinematography: Sebastian Winterø
- Edited by: Olivia Neergaard-Holm
- Music by: Carl-Johan Sevedag; Jan Ekstrand
- Production companies: Ape&Bjørn; Tangy
- Distributed by: TriArt Film
- Release date: 18 February 2023 (Berlin)
- Running time: 119 minutes
- Countries: Sweden; Norway
- Languages: Swedish; Persian

Opponent (Swedish: Motståndaren; Persian: دشمن) is a 2023 drama film written and directed by Milad Alami. The film stars Payman Maadi as Iman, an Iranian man who has moved to Sweden as a refugee with his wife Maryam (Marall Nasiri) and their daughters Asal (Nicole Mehrbod) and Sahar (Diana Farzami). A wrestler in Iran before being forced to escape the country, he turns back to the sport in hopes of speeding up his asylum application by trying out for the Swedish national wrestling team, building toward the revelation that the real reason he was forced to leave Iran was that one of his former teammates outed him to the community as a closeted gay man, which carries the penalty of execution in the Islamic Republic of Iran.

The cast also includes Björn Elgerd, Amirali Abanzad, Ahmed Abdullahi, Robin Ahlqvist, Leyla Aksoy, Anton Andersson, William Arvidsson, Helya Beikzadeh, Anton Carlsson, Ardalan Esmaili, Diana Farzami, Sevin Fidan, Anton Jalneskog, Jonatan Jednell, Tobias Johansson, Arvin Kananian and Max Karlsson.

It was selected as the Swedish entry for the Best International Feature Film at the 96th Academy Awards, but it was not nominated.

== Distribution ==
An excerpt from the film was screened as a work in progress at the 2021 Les Arcs Film Festival, where it was the winner of the TitraFilm Award.

The film premiered at the 73rd Berlin International Film Festival in February 2023. It was later screened at the 2023 Inside Out Film and Video Festival, the Seattle International Film Festival, and the 57th Karlovy Vary International Film Festival.

== Reception ==
=== Critical response ===
Opponent has an approval rating of 94% on review aggregator website Rotten Tomatoes, based on 16 reviews, and an average rating of 7.5/10.

=== Awards ===
At Seattle, Nasiri received a Special Jury Prize for her performance.

== See also ==
- List of submissions to the 96th Academy Awards for Best International Feature Film
- List of Swedish submissions for the Academy Award for Best International Feature Film
