= The Music of Silence =

2017 biographical film

- Directed by: Michael Radford
- Written by: Anna Pavignano; Michael Radford
- Produced by: Monika Bacardi; Jordi Mollà; Toby Sebastian; Paola Lavini; Andrea Iervolino
- Starring: Toby Sebastian; Jordi Mollà; Antonio Banderas; Luisa Ranieri; Ennio Fantastichini; Francesco Salvi
- Cinematography: Stefano Falivene
- Edited by: Roberto Missiroli
- Music by: Gabriele Roberto
- Production company: Picomedi
- Distributed by: AMBI Group
- Release dates: 6 September 2017 (France); 10 September 2017 (Italy)
- Running time: 115 minutes
- Country: Italy
- Languages: English, Italian
- Box office: $154,478

The Music of Silence (Italian: La musica del silenzio) is a 2017 Italian biographical film directed by Michael Radford, based on the 1999 novel of the same name written by the tenor Andrea Bocelli and freely inspired by his childhood life until the beginning of his career. Bocelli is played by Toby Sebastian with the alter ego of Amos Bardi. The Italian tenor physically appears in a scene of the film and his presence accompanies the entire film in the form of a first-person narrative. The film received negative reviews from critics and made $154,478 at the box office.

== Plot ==
Born with an eye condition that eventually leads to his blindness, Andrea Bocelli pursues his ambition and becomes a popular singer and songwriter.

== Cast ==
- Toby Sebastian as Amos Bardi
- Luisa Ranieri as Edi
- Jordi Mollà as Sandro
- Antonio Banderas as The Maestro
- Ennio Fantastichini as Giovanni
- Francesca Prandi as Katia
- Anthony Souter as Umberto
- Nadir Caselli as Ellonora
- Alessandro Sperduti as Adriano
- Francesco Salvi as Ettore
- Stefania Orsola Garello as Maestro's wife
- Antonella Attili as Miss Giamprini

== Reception ==
=== Box office ===
As of 22 October 2024, The Music of Silence has grossed $154,478 worldwide.

=== Critical response ===
On review aggregator website Rotten Tomatoes, the film holds an approval rating of 0%, based on 17 reviews, and an average rating of 4.5/10. On Metacritic, the film has a weighted average score of 25 out of 100, based on 5 critics, indicating "generally unfavorable reviews".
