= Mending Hugo's Heart =

2017 Swedish film by Helena Bergström

- Promotional poster
- Swedish: Vilken jävla cirkus
- Directed by: Helena Bergström
- Written by: Helena Bergström
- Starring: Gustav Lindh; Molly Nutley; Tomas von Brömssen
- Release date: 20 October 2017
- Country: Sweden
- Language: Swedish

Mending Hugo's Heart (Swedish: Vilken jävla cirkus, lit. 'What a fucking circus') is a 2017 Swedish dramatic comedy film written and directed by Helena Bergström. The film follows Hugo (Gustav Lindh), a university student left directionless by the tragic death of his girlfriend Agnes (Evin Ahmad), after he somewhat accidentally joins a financially struggling circus troupe led by Casall (Tomas von Brömssen). It premiered on 20 October 2017 and received negative reviews from critics.

== Plot ==
University student Hugo is devastated by the death of his girlfriend, talented young violinist Agnes. While cycling to visit her grave, he crashes and is knocked unconscious. He wakes up in a wagon belonging to Casall, the leader of a down-on-their-luck circus group. Using his background in economics, he begins to help them get their finances in order and in the meantime grows closer with the eccentric circus ensemble, especially the stable girl Anna.

== Cast ==
- Gustav Lindh as Hugo
- Molly Nutley as Anna
- Tomas von Brömssen as Casall
- Evin Ahmad as Agnes
- Johan Widerberg as Pelle
- Aliette Opheim as Isabelle
- Vanna Rosenberg as Maggan
- Trolle Rhodin as Sergio
- Marta Oldenburg as Oksana
- Agneta Ehrensvärd as Sigrid
- Łukasz Wójcik as Zbigniew
- Livia Millhagen as Hugo's mother
- Reuben Sallmander as Hugo's father
- Charlie Gustafsson as Ludwig

== Production ==
The film was written and directed by Helena Bergström. She wrote her first draft of the script in 2010.

Filming began at the end of January 2017. It was primarily filmed in Ulricehamn and Gothenburg. For the project, a large tent was constructed north of Ulricehamn.

== Release ==
It premiered on 20 October 2017.

== Reception ==
Mending Hugo's Heart received 1/5 stars from Helena Lindblad in Dagens Nyehter. She criticized the film's "strangely tone-deaf" and cliché treatment of suicide and femicide. It was panned by Björn Jansson in Sveriges Radio and given 2/6 stars by Sebastian Lindvall in Svenska Dagbladet. Sofia Olsson also gave the film a negative review, although she cited von Brömssen's performance as especially effective.
