= Gustav Lindh =

Swedish actor (born 1995)

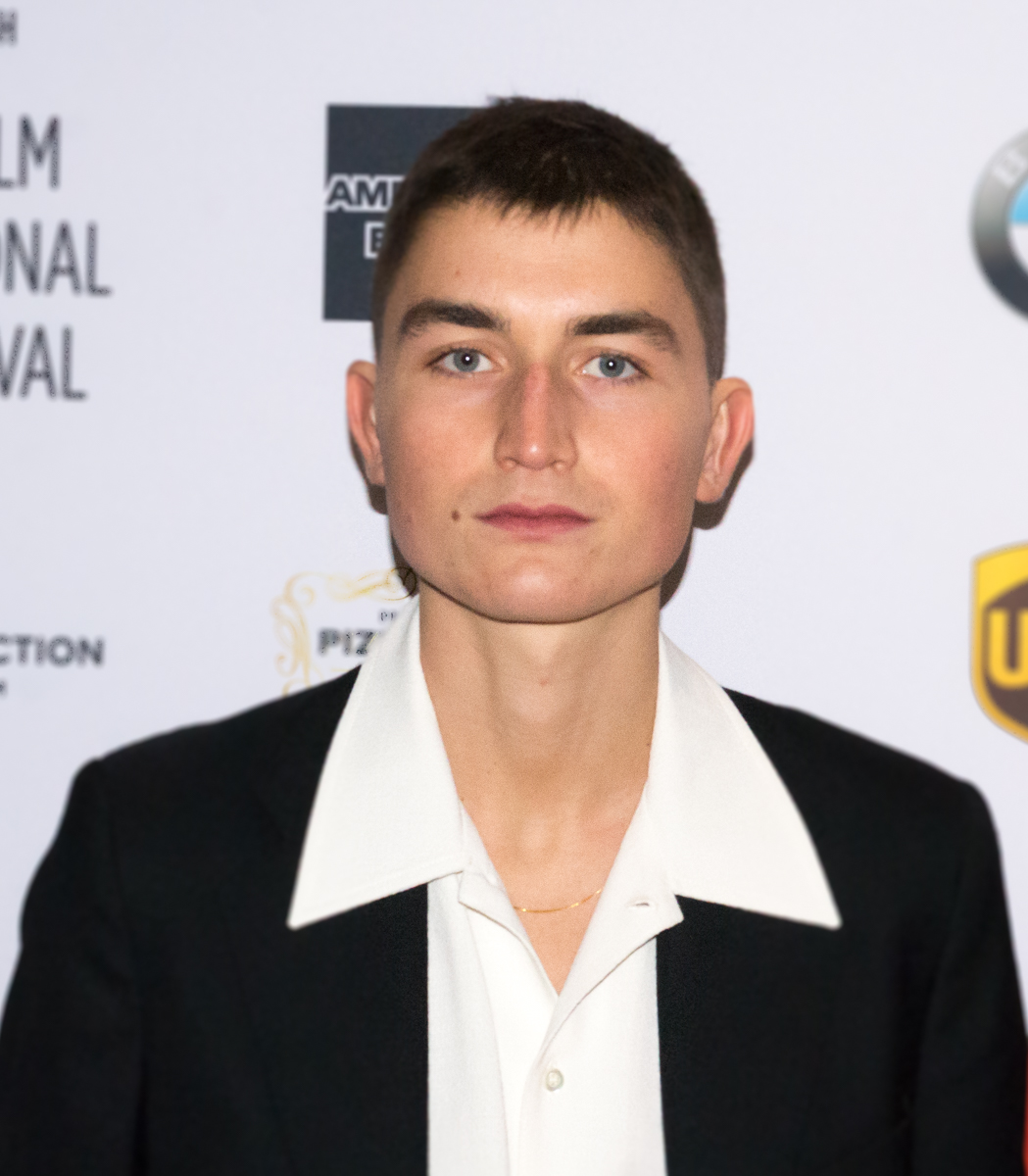
- Lindh in 2018
- Born: 1995 (age 30–31); Västerås, Sweden
- Education: Malmö Theater Academy
- Occupation: Actor
- Children: 1

Gustav Lindh (born 1995) is a Swedish actor. He is known in Sweden for his TV roles as Aron in Älska mig and as Jörgen Olsson in Jordskott, and became internationally best known for his role in Queen of Hearts.

== Early life and education ==
Gustav Lindh was born in 1995 and raised in Västerås.

He graduated from the Malmö Theater Academy.

== Career ==
Lindh made his film debut in The Circle (2015), and then became known for his roles in two TV series: as Aron in Älska mig, and as Jörgen Olsson in Jordskott.

He played the titular role in the 2017 film Mending Hugo's Heart and became internationally best known for his role in Queen of Hearts.

In 2020, he played a role in the Viaplay film Orca, and in 2022, he played the character Thorir the Proud in The Northman.

He plays the young version of the character David in the 2025 television drama series Faithless (Trolösa), based on the 2000 feature film Faithless, directed by Tomas Alfredson. His co-stars include Frida Gustavsson as his lover Marianna, as well as Lena Endre, Jesper Christensen, and August Wittgenstein. The series premiered on SVT on 26 January 2025, and was scheduled to be released on other platforms, including Apple TV.

== Filmography ==
- 2015 – The Circle
- ? – Älska mig (TV series)
- 2016–2017 – Jordskott (TV series)
- 2016 – Beck – episode "Steinar"
- 2016 – Springfloden
- 2017 – Mending Hugo's Heart
- 2018 – Maria Wern - Viskningar i vinden (TV series)
- 2018 – Sthlm Rekviem (TV series)
- 2018 – De dagar som blommorna blommar (TV series)
- 2019 – Älska mig (TV-series)
- 2019 – Queen of Hearts
- 2020 – Top Dog (TV series)
- 2020 – Beartown (TV series)
- 2020 – Orca
- 2020 – Riders of Justice
- 2022 – The Northman
- 2022 – Bränn alla mina brev
- 2023 – The Promised Land
- 2024 – Industry (TV series)
- 2025 – Faithless (Trolösa; TV series)
- 2026 – A Prayer for the Dying
- 2026 – Wicker
