= Trading Paint =

2019 film directed by Karzan Kader

- Film poster
- Directed by: Karzan Kader
- Written by: Gary Gerani; Craig R. Welch
- Produced by: Alberto Burgueño; Andrea Iervolino; Alexandra Klim; Silvio Muraglia
- Starring: John Travolta; Michael Madsen; Shania Twain; Toby Sebastian
- Cinematography: José David Montero
- Edited by: Alex Freitas; Julia Juaniz
- Music by: Victor Reyes
- Production companies: AMBI Media Group; Paradox Studios; Elipsis Capital; Raven; Sculptor Media
- Distributed by: Saban Films
- Release date: February 22, 2019
- Running time: 87 minutes
- Country: United States
- Language: English
- Box office: $6,898

Trading Paint (also released as Burning Rubber) is a 2019 American sport action drama film directed by Karzan Kader, with a script co-written by Craig Welch and Gary Gerani. It stars John Travolta, Michael Madsen, Shania Twain (in her film debut) and Toby Sebastian.

Principal photography began in August 2017 in Alabama. The film was released on February 22, 2019 to generally negative reviews from critics.

== Plot ==
Sam and Cam Munroe are a father and son duo competing at the Talladega Short Track dirt race track. Sam is a local racing legend who now supports his son's racing in between dating divorcee Becca. Despite being a talented racer, Cam's car does not race well due to poor funding. Frustrated for losing the race due to engine issues, Sam's long-time rival, Bob Linsky, offers Cam a chance to join his team with a new car. Cam decides to leave his father to join Linksy as a chance to prove his worth and win races. When Cam tells his father about his choice to join Linsky, Sam is enraged and warns that Linsky is a snake before firing his own son from the garage.

Feeling down from Cam's defection, Sam spends the night drinking his woes away. By the following day, Sam decides to bring himself out of retirement and restore his status as a champion racer. While everyone thinks Sam is crazy to race so late in life, he quickly proves his experience and driving skills are still top notch and wins several races. With Sam reclaiming his title as champion racer, Linsky feels threatened by Sam and wants Cam to crash into Sam's car. Unable to crash into his father, Linsky has another racer stage a crash at the next race. Dunn causes Cam to spin out and Sam crashes into Cam's car onto the side. Although Cam survives his crash, he suffers multiple fractures on his leg and he is out of race for several months.

In between these six months of recovery, Sam and Cam make peace with each other and Sam learns about Linsky wanting Cam to crash into him. With both cars severely damaged, they need a new car to get back into racing. Throughout this time, Sam has kept the 1970 Mustang that killed his wife. Because of sentimental value, he could never sell it. However, in order to buy a new dirt Late Model for Cam to drive, which costs about $80,000, Sam decides to sell his car to Linsky. Now devoting all his energy into building the new car, the Munroe family pools their efforts into getting the car ready and supports Cam's return to the circuit.

Linsky wants to beat Sam to finally prove who is the better racer; he has to settle with racing Cam instead. During the race, Linsky spins out Cam in the final two laps of the race. Cam manages to restart his car and rallies from the rear of the field over the final two laps (which is quite unlikely) and wins the race. Linsky is denied his victory as Munroe won the race. When commenting about the race with the press, Cam gives credit to Sam and his loving wife for their support. In the aftermath, the Munroes celebrate Cam's daughter's first birthday. Cam has gotten a new apartment to settle the family in and Sam solidifies his relationship with Becca, having finally found happiness and peace with his life.

== Cast ==
- John Travolta as Sam Munroe
- Shania Twain as Becca
- Toby Sebastian as Cam Munroe
- Rosabell Laurenti Sellers as Cindy Munro, Cam's Wife
- Michael Madsen as Bob Linsky
- Kevin Dunn as "Stumpy"
- Buck Taylor as Ben
- Luis Da Silva as Diner Redneck
- Margaret Bowman as Martha
- Gioia Libardoni as Kelly
- Denny Méndez as Dr. Deena Thompson
- Chris Mullinax as Jack Dunn
- Red Farmer as Ray Miller
- Jen Baker and Faith Bruner as Track Girls
- Jonathan Aidan Cockrell as James
- John Flanagan as Race Car Driver
- Haley Flanagan as Banquet Dancer
- Audrey Fafard as Jenny Monroe
- Jen Baker as Track Girl 1
- Faith Bruner as Track Girl 2

== Reception ==
=== Box office ===
Trading Paint was released on VOD and not theatrically in the United States and Canada. It grossed $6,898 in other territories.

=== Critical reception ===
On the review aggregator website Rotten Tomatoes, 0% of 13 critics' reviews are positive, with an average rating of 3.8/10. Metacritic, which uses a weighted average, assigned the film a score of 34 out of 100, based on 5 critics, indicating "generally unfavorable" reviews.

=== Accolades ===
John Travolta won the Golden Raspberry Award for Worst Actor for his performance (and also for his performance in The Fanatic).
