= Handbok för superhjältar =

2025 film by Patrik Forsberg

- Directed by: Patrik Forsberg
- Written by: Anoo Bhagavan
- Produced by: Caroline Forsberg; Patrik Forsberg
- Starring: Suzanne Reuter; Tusse; Malte Gårdinger; Robert Gustafsson; Gizem Erdogan; Shima Niavarani
- Release date: December 25, 2025
- Running time: 91 minutes
- Country: Sweden
- Language: Swedish

Handbok för superhjältar (English: Handbook for Superheroes) is a Swedish animated film, released to cinemas on 25 December 2025. It is distributed by Stiller Studios and Qvisten Animation.

== Plot ==
Lisa is new to Rosenhill and gets bullied at school. When she finds a book that makes her a superhero, she and her bullies join forces to stop a gangster from destroying the city.

== Cast ==
- Elle Kari Bergenrud – Lisa
- Tusse – Max
- Malte Gårdinger – Robert
- Adam Kais – Nick
- Robert Gustafsson – Wolfgang and Steve the Goose
- Gizem Erdogan – Rebecka
- Shima Niavarani – Olga
- Shebly Niavarani – Oscar
- Suzanne Reuter – Granny and Caroline
