= Almqvist =

Swedish surname

Almqvist is a surname of Swedish origin. Notable people with the surname include:

- Anders Almqvist (1885–1915), Swedish rower who competed in the 1912 Summer Olympics
- Bertil Almqvist (1902–1972), Swedish author and illustrator
- Carl Jonas Love Almqvist (1793–1866), Swedish composers and romantic poet
- Erland Almqvist (1912–1999), Swedish sailor who competed in the 1952 Summer Olympics
- Ester Almqvist (1869–1934), Swedish painter
- Gertrud Almqvist (1875–1954), Swedish writer and feminist
- Ingrid Almqvist (1927–2017), Swedish javelin thrower
- Johan Magnus Almqvist (1799–1873), Swedish theologian
- Kurt Almqvist (1912–2001), Swedish poet, intellectual and spiritual figure
- Ludvig Almqvist (1818–1884), Swedish politician
- Niklas Almqvist (born 1977), Swedish guitarist and backup vocalist
- Pelle Almqvist (born 1978), Swedish lead singer of Swedish garage rock band The Hives
- Pontus Almqvist (born 1999), Swedish footballer
