= Adam Kais =

Swedish actor (born 1996)

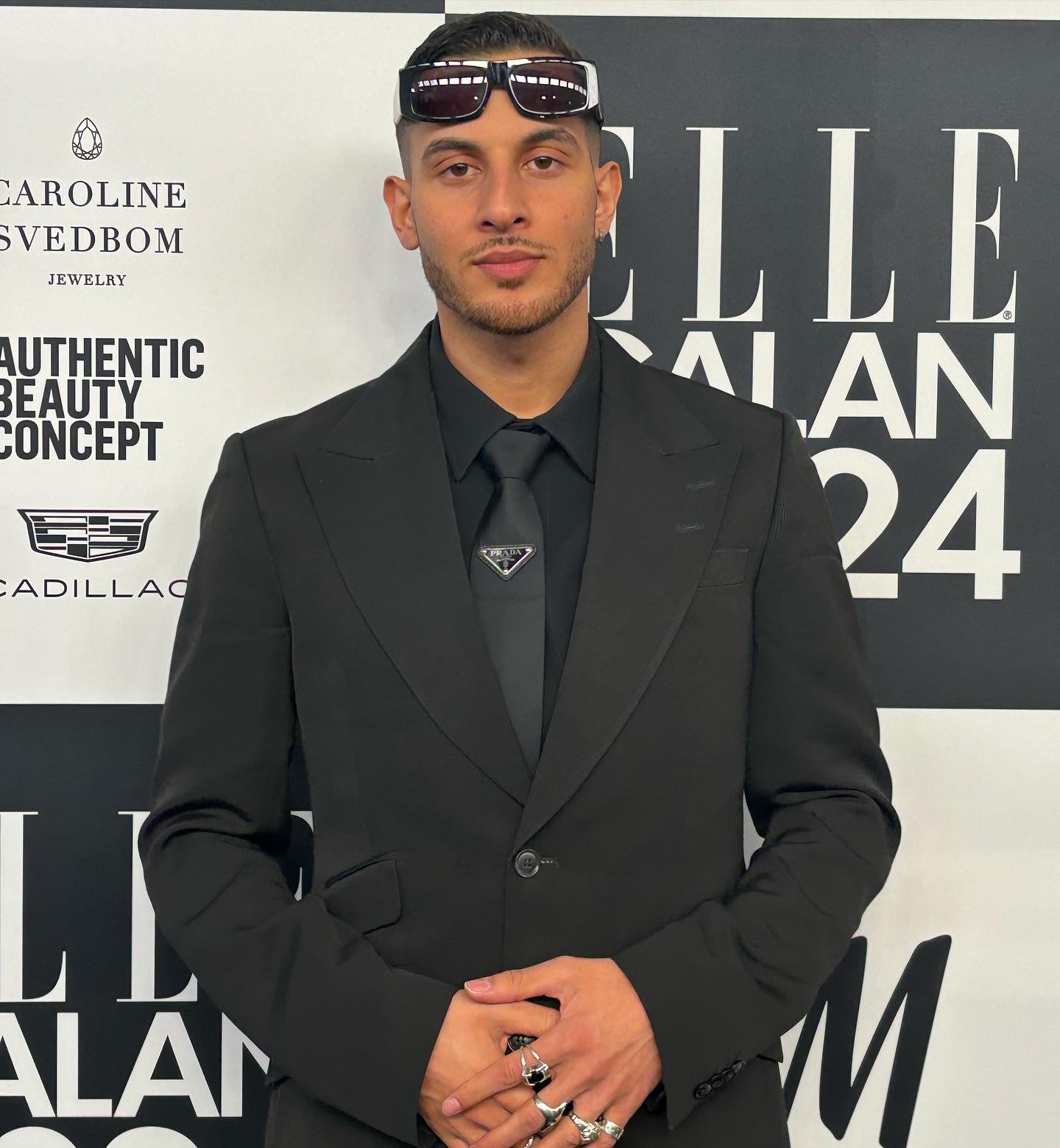
- Adam Kais in 2024
- Born: Adam Kais Aziz; 10 August 1996; Istanbul, Turkey
- Occupation: Actor

Adam Kais Aziz (born 10 August 1996) is a Swedish actor. He was born in Istanbul, and grew up in Nyköping and studied at the Teaterhögskolan in Malmö. His first acting role was in the short film Vi var barn då. He is best known for his role as ”Zaki” in the Netflix series Snabba Cash.

== Filmography ==
- 2022 – Vi var barn då (shortfilm)
- 2022 – Snabba cash (TV-series)
- 2023 – Bullets
- 2025 – Handbok för superhjältar
