= Codename: Annika =

Finnish crime drama television series

- Promotional poster
- Finnish: Koodinimi: Annika
- Genre: Crime drama; Neo-noir
- Created by: Aleksi Bardy; Mia Ylönen
- Written by: Mia Ylönen
- Directed by: Antti-Jussi Annila
- Starring: Sannah Nedergård; Ardalan Esmaili; Eva Melander; Pekka Strang; Clarisse Lhoni-Botte; Miro Lopperi; Moa Gammel
- Composer: Panu Aaltio
- Country of origin: Finland; Sweden
- Original languages: Finnish; Swedish; French
- No. of seasons: 1
- No. of episodes: 6

Production
- Executive producers: Aleksi Bardy; Steve Matthews; Christian Wikander; Mia Ylönen
- Cinematography: Sari Aaltonen
- Editor: Tambet Tasuja
- Running time: 39–51 minutes
- Production company: Helsinki-Filmi

Original release
- Network: SkyShowtime
- Release: 30 September – 4 November 2023

Codename: Annika (Finnish: Koodinimi: Annika; Swedish: Kodnamn: Annika) is a Finnish-Swedish neo-noir crime drama television series. It was released on SkyShowtime on 30 September 2023 as one of the platform's first original series.

== Premise ==
Finnish art fraud investigator Emma Haka goes undercover to investigate money laundering in Stockholm. To do this, she assumes the identity of Annika Stormare, a socialite and party girl.

== Cast ==
- Sannah Nedergård as Emma Haka/Annika Stormare
  - Lilja Kekkonen as young Emma Haka
- Ardalan Esmaili as Rasmus Ståhlgren
- Eva Melander as Rina Olander
- Pekka Strang as Raimo Korpi
- Clarisse Lhoni-Botte as Béatrice Joly
- Miro Lopperi as Sampio Raivio
- Moa Gammel as Annika Storm
- Kajsa Ernst as Nora Vacklin
- David Fukamachi Regnfors as Jens Holmström
- Helena Bergström as Agatha Torstensson
- Thomas Hanzon as Magnus Torstensson
- Jimmy Lindström as Micke Rask
- Fanni Noroila as Laura
- Naida Ragimova as Ivanka
- Jasir Osman as Ricky
- Carl-Kristian Rundman as Jouko Haka
- Fairuz Bhuiyan as Emma's friend
- Siiri Lehtiö as Emma's friend
- Catrin Kaitaro as Emma's friend
- Charles Martins as Denver Carpentier
- Omid Khansari as Sherwan Kamil

== Episodes ==
No.	Title	Duration	Original release date
1	"Provenance"	42 min	30 September 2023
2	"Impasto"	40 min	7 October 2023
3	"Pentimento"	47 min	14 October 2023
4	"Fauve"	46 min	21 October 2023
5	"Trompe l'oeil"	39 min	28 October 2023
6	"Chiaroscuro"	51 min	4 November 2023

== Production ==
In October 2021, HBO Europe commissioned the series under the working title ID, with production beginning in 2022. In January 2023, the series was acquired by SkyShowtime.

A teaser trailer for the series was unveiled at the Stockholm International Film Festival in August 2023.

== Reception ==
Pia Ingström of Hufvudstadsbladet gave the series three out of five stars, calling it "a very competent and exciting thriller."
