= Gizem Erdogan =

Swedish actress (born 1987)

- Born: 1987 (age 38–39); Högsbo, Gothenburg, Sweden
- Education: Malmö Theatre Academy
- Occupation: Actress

Gizem Suna Kling Erdogan (born 1987) is a Swedish actress.

== Early life and education ==
She was born in 1987 in Högsbo, Gothenburg, to parents from Turkey. Erdogan studied at the Malmö Theatre Academy between 2012 and 2015.

== Career ==
In 2015, she made her acting debut in the film Svenskjävel. In 2017, she had the role in the film Beyond Dreams, for which she was nominated for a Guldbagge Award for Best Actress in a Supporting Role in 2018. In 2017, Erdogan was nominated for the Rising Star Award at the Stockholm Film Festival. In 2020, Erdogan won a Kristallen award for best female actress in a television production for her role in the SVT series Caliphate. In 2020, she played a book publisher in the Netflix series Love & Anarchy. The year after, she again was nominated for the same award at Kristallen for her role as Leah in the SVT series The Thin Blue Line. She also had a leading role in the Sveriges Television's Christmas calendar for 2021 En hederlig jul med Knyckertz. In 2022, she was named as "shooting star" by an international jury at the European Film Promotion (EFP). In 2022, she had a role in the Netflix series The Playlist.

== Acting credits ==
=== Film ===
Year	Title	Role	Notes	Ref.
2015	Svenskjävel			
2017	Beyond Dreams			
2019	My Life as a Comedian			
2025	The Home			
2025	Handbok för superhjältar			

=== Television ===
Year	Title	Role	Notes	Ref.
2020	Caliphate			
2021–2022	Thin Blue Line	Leah		
2022	The Playlist			
2026	Vaka			

=== Theatre ===
Year	Title	Role	Venue	Notes	Ref.
2014	Lolita		Stockholm City Theatre		
2015	The Wave	Ensemble	Stockholm City Theatre in Skärholmen		
2016	Alice in Wonderland	Alice	Gothenburg City Theatre		
2016	Romeo and Juliet	Juliet	Kulturhuset Stadsteatern	Main stage	

== See also ==
- List of people from Gothenburg
- List of Swedish actors (includes actresses and male actors)
