= Bekas (film) =

2012 film by Karzan Kader

- Theatrical release poster
- Sorani Kurdish: بێکەس
- Directed by: Karzan Kader
- Screenplay by: Karzan Kader
- Produced by: Sandra Harms
- Starring: Zamand Taha; Sarwar Fazil
- Cinematography: Johan Holmqvist
- Edited by: Michal Leszczylowski; Sebastian Ringler
- Music by: Juhana Lehtiniemi
- Production company: Sonet Film AB
- Distributed by: Falcon Films (Middle East)
- Release dates: November 9, 2012 (Stockholm International Film Festival); December 10, 2012 (Dubai International Film Festival); January 30, 2013 (GIFF); June 26, 2013 (EIFF)
- Running time: 97 minutes
- Countries: Sweden, Finland, Iraq
- Language: Kurdish
- Budget: €2 million
- Box office: $479,226

Bekas (Sorani Kurdish: بێکەس) is a 2012 Kurdish-language comedy-drama film written and directed by Karzan Kader. The film stars Zamand Taha and Sarwar Fazil. Shot in Iraq, Bekas is an international co-production between Finland, Iraq and Sweden.

== Plot ==
Set in the 1990s of Iraqi Kurdistan, the story follows two shoeshiner brothers named Dana (Zamand) and Zana (Sarwar) who set off to America in order to meet Superman.

== Screenings ==
Bekas had its inaugural screening at the Dubai Film Festival in 2012. It was later screened at the 6th Bangalore International Film Festival in Bengaluru on December 26, 2013.

== Awards and nominations ==
Bekas won a People's Choice Award and was nominated for the Muhr Arab Award at the 2012 Dubai Film Festival.
