= Berlin Feminist Film Week =

International film event

The Berlin Feminist Film Week (BFFW) is an international one-week event which shows feminist films from around the world, seeking to increase representation of women, POC and queer filmmakers in the industry.

== History ==
The festival was founded in 2014 by Karin Fornander. It provides "visibility for all femtastic filmmakers out there and highlight films with interesting, complex female characters and films which challenge existing gender norms." Festival organizers cite the meager screen time afforded to female lead characters, and note that the time afforded to queer WOC characters is even less. The festival began as a film night, and gradually evolved into a full-blown festival. The festival receives little funding, and maintains the DIY culture of its beginnings, though it began to accept submissions in 2018, and hopes to increase the influence the platform provides in favor of films created by other than cis-white males.

BFFW opens every year during the week of International Women's Day, which became an official holiday in Germany in 2018. Attendance has grown every year, and the quality and diversity of film has increased accordingly. The 6th edition of the festival in 2019 featured only queer films with strong female-driven narratives. Every year, the festival announces the Audience Choice award for the best film.

== Focus ==
The mission of the Berlin Feminist Film Week is to provide a platform for female, non-binary, queer, trans and WOC filmmakers who challenge the hegemony of white cis-male filmmakers. The festival seeks to showcase and explore the diversity of female identity, and challenge gender norms, especially in terms of how they are represented in Hollywood and more mainstream independent films.

== Filmography (selected) ==
- Angels Wear White (BFFW 2019)
- Beyond Dreams (BFFW 2018)
- The Miseducation of Cameron Post (BFFW 2018)
- I am Not a Witch (BFFW 2017)
- Hooligan Sparrow (BFFW 2017)
- While You Weren't Looking (BFFW 2016)
- Difret (BFFW 2015)
- Eat, Sleep, Die (BFFW 2014)
