= Andrev Walden =

Swedish writer (born 1976)

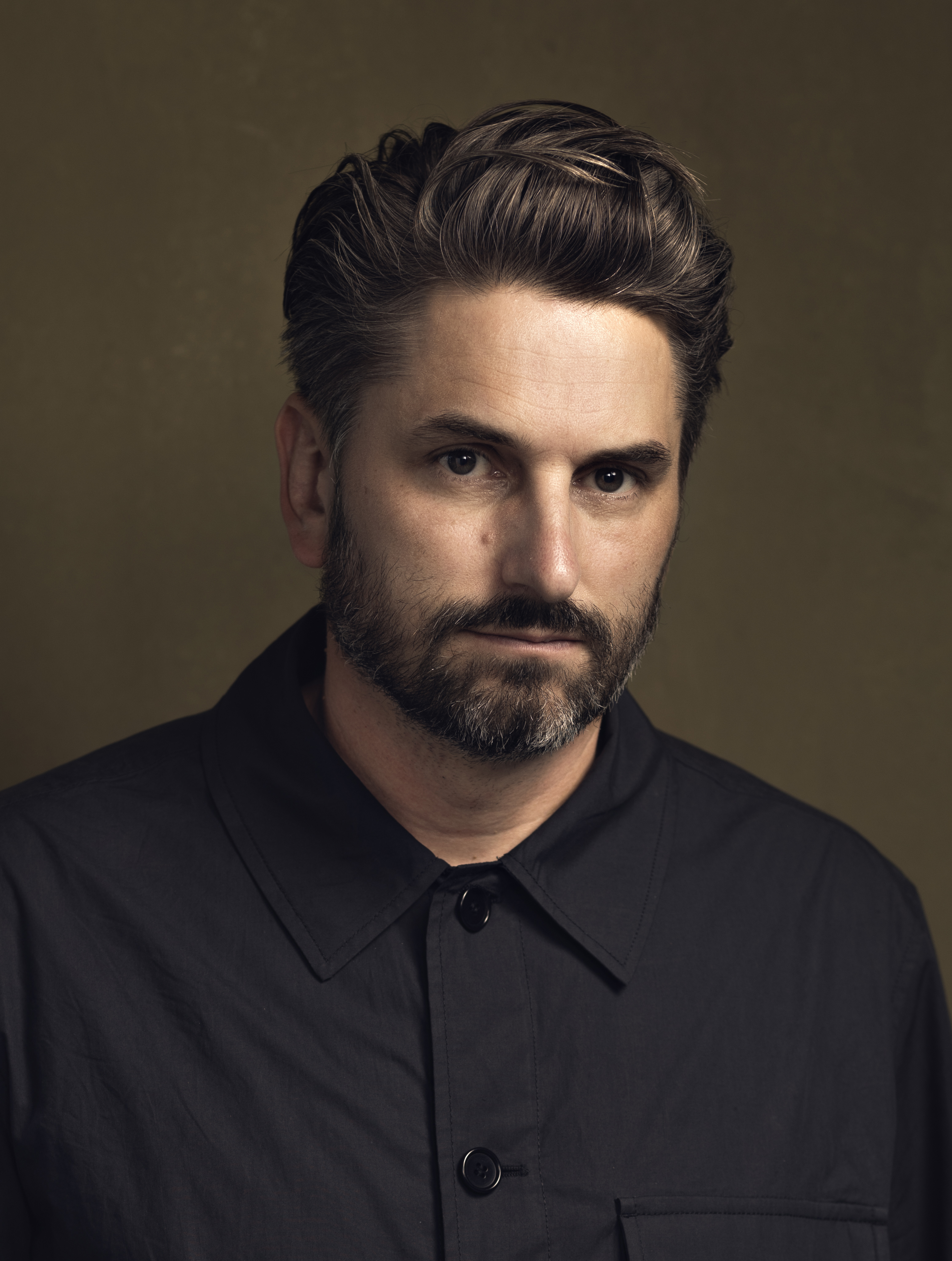
- Walden in 2023
- Born: Igor Andrev Walden; 14 May 1976 (age 50); Mariefred, Sweden
- Occupation: Writer
- Awards: August Prize (2023)

Andrev Walden (born 14 May 1976) is a Swedish author and journalist who won the 2023 August Prize with his debut novel Jävla karlar.

== Biography ==
Igor Andrev Walden was born on 14 May 1976 in Mariefred, and grew up in Norrköping. He began a journalism program at Bona Folk High School but did not graduate. He worked at Aftonbladet for over ten years.

In 2023, Walden's semi-autobiographical debut novel Jävla karlar was published in Sweden by Bokförlaget Polaris. The book went on to win the 2023 August Prize in the Fiction category. It was also the bestselling Swedish book of the year.

Translation rights in the work were subsequently sold to multiple territories in Europe, while English-language rights were acquired in by Penguin Books imprint Fig Tree. The book was published in the UK in July 2025 as Bloody Awful in Different Ways.

== Works ==
- Jävla karlar ("Bloody Men"), 2023. English translation by Ian Giles under the title Bloody Awful in Different Ways, 31 July 2025.

== Awards ==
- 2023 – August Prize for Jävla karlar
- 2023 – Adlibrispriset
- 2023 – Stockholmspriset
