= Backa Theatre =

Youth theatre in Gothenburg, Sweden

- Backa teater
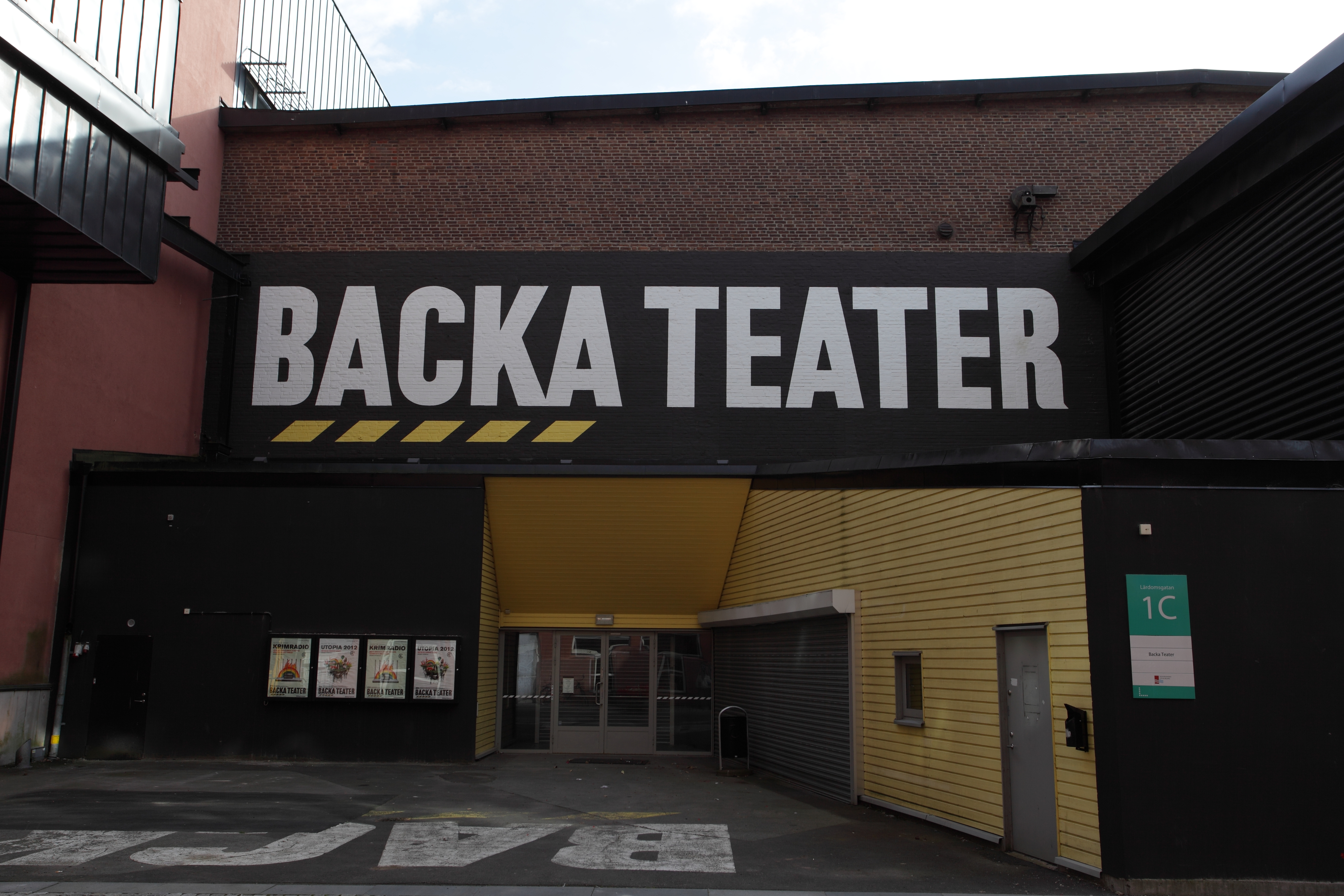
- Entrance of theatre in 2012
- Interactive map of Backa Theatre
- Address: Lärdomsgatan 1C; Gothenburg; Sweden
- Coordinates: 57.705226°N 11.935304°E

Construction
- Reopened: 17 November 2007

Website
- stadsteatern.goteborg.se/backa-teater/

Backa Theatre (Swedish: Backa Teater) is a youth theater located in Gothenburg, Sweden. It focuses on producing theater for children and their families.

The theater (then known as Skolteatern) was founded in 1978 by Eva Bergman, Ulf Dohlsten, and Maria Hedborg as part of Gothenburg City Theatre. Bergman remained the artistic director of the theatre for just over 20 years.

On 30 March 2006, it was announced that playwright and director Mattias Andersson would be succeeding Alexander Öberg as artistic director. In October 2020, Andersson announced was leaving after 13 years at Backa Theatre.

The theatre moved to a new space in 2007, which cost 54 million SEK and was slightly larger than their previous location at 3,300 square metres. The official reopening was on 17 November.
