= Karzan Kader =

Kurdish film actor, director and screenwriter (born 1982)

- کارزان قادر
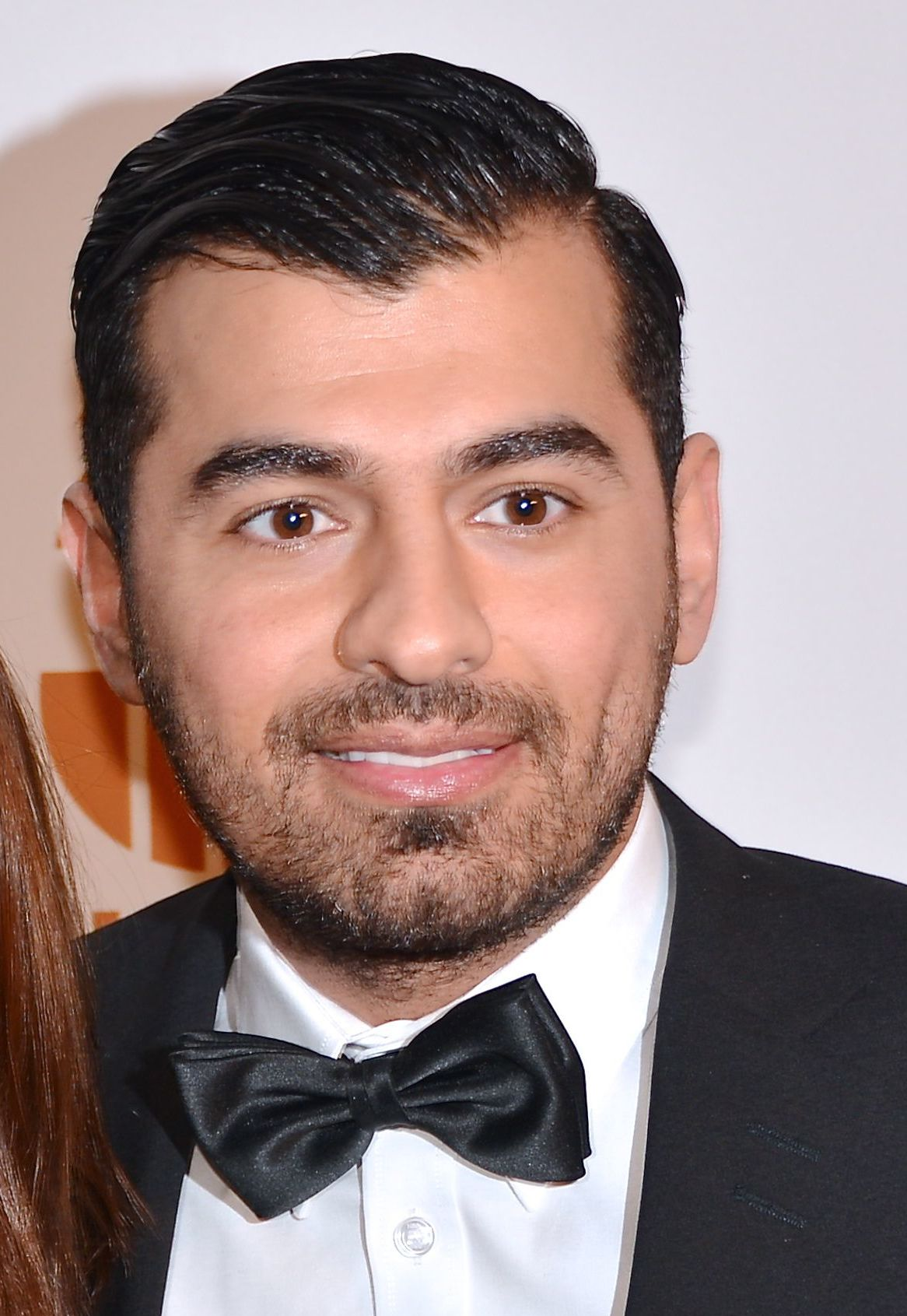
- Kader in 2013
- Born: September 8, 1982 (age 43); Sulaymaniyah, Kurdistan region, Iraq
- Education: Dramatiska Institutet (graduated as film director)
- Occupations: Actor, Director, Screenwriter
- Years active: 2008-now

Karzan Kader (born 8 September 1982) is an Iraqi Kurdish film actor, director, writer. He lives in Stockholm. Karzan Kader was nine years old when his family fled Kurdistan during the Iraq War in 1990. They settled in Sweden, where Kader and his siblings were raised. In 2007 he enrolled in Stockholm Academy of Dramatic Arts (SADA) to study directing. His short film "Bekas" eventually won a Student Oscar and was developed into the acclaimed feature-length film by the same name.

Karzan graduated from Dramatiska Institutet as a Film director in 2010 and won a Student Award for his graduation film.

== Filmography ==
=== As an actor ===
Year	Title	Role	Notes	Source
2010	The Last Four	Hiwa		IMDb

=== As a director ===
Year	Title	Notes	Source
2008	Collision (short)		IMDb
2009	Quan (short)		IMDb
2009	Bekas (short)		IMDb
2010	The Last Four		IMDb
2012	Bekas		IMDb
2018	Trading Paint		IMDb
