= Theodore C. Almquist =

United States Air Force general

Theodore C. Almquist (November 29, 1941 – April 22, 2010) was a brigadier general in the United States Air Force.

== Career ==
From 1966 to 1967, Almquist was a dental intern at Wilford Hall Medical Center at Lackland Air Force Base. Afterwards, he was assigned to RAF Upper Heyford in England until 1970, at which time he returned to Wilford Hall Medical Center.

In 1972, Almquist became the chief dentist assistant director of general medical practices at Chanute Air Force Base. He remained there until 1975 when he was stationed at Ramstein Air Force Base in West Germany. From June 1976 to June 1978 he was stationed at Hessich Oldendorf Germany. In 1978, Almquist again returned to Wilford Hall Medical Center. Two years later, he was assigned to Brooks Air Force Base. From 1984 to 1988, Almquist was director of dental service at Offutt Air Force Base. Later, he was named command dental surgeon for Alaskan Air Command and base dental surgeon at Elmendorf Air Force Base.

Almquist became assistant surgeon general for dental services of the Air Force and assumed command and chairman of the first region of Tricare in 1995. He retired in 1998.

Awards he received during his career include the Legion of Merit, the Meritorious Service Medal with four oak leaf clusters, the Air Force Commendation Medal, the Outstanding Unit Award with three oak leaf clusters and the National Defense Service Medal with service star.

Having been diagnosed with colon cancer two years earlier, Almquist died in his sleep on the morning of April 22, 2010.

== Education ==
- Gustavus Adolphus College
- University of Iowa College of Dentistry
- University of Texas Health Science Center at Houston
