= Jesper Waldersten =

Swedish artist (born 1969)

Jesper Waldersten (born 1969 in Stockholm, Sweden) is a Swedish Illustrator and artist.

== Career ==
Waldersten's illustrations have for many years been seen in Dagens Nyheter, Sweden's leading morning paper. He has illustrated for Månadsjournalen, Berwaldhallen and has also created album covers. His work has been shown in several exhibitions, including Galleri Charlotte Lund in Stockholm, Grafikens hus and Färgfabriken. He has worked as an art director and has also directed a music video for Ane Brun. In 2012 he published his book Kent Waldersten – Lägg er inte i! in collaboration with the music group Kent. The book was released in conjunction with Kent's album release of Jag är inte rädd för mörkret and contains photographs, texts, collages and drawings created by Jesper Waldersten during the recording of the album.

Waldersten has been called one of Sweden's most popular illustrators and artists. He has illustrated books for authors such as Lennart Hellsing but also published several of his own books. In 2003, his first children's book Godnattfnatt was published. Waldersten 365 is the result of a project in which he every day for a whole year he created at least one unique image that was published on his website www.waldersten.com. The book was awarded in The Swedish Book Arts Award 2011.

== Awards ==
- 2013 Svenska Fotobokpriset "Walderstens Instagram". Nominated
- 2012 Swedish Design Award for "Waldersten365". 1 Silver and 1 Daredevil Award
- 2012 Swedish Book Art Award for "Waldersten365”
- 2010 Best of Newspaper Design 2009. Award of Excellence
- 2007 Kolla Graphic Design&Illustration. 1 Gold
- 2006 Best of Newspaper Design 2005. 1 Award of Excellence
- 2005 Best of Newspaper Design 2004. 2 Silver
- 2004 Kolla Graphic Design&Illustration 2004. 1 Gold, 2 Silver
- 2004 Swedish Book Art Award for "Godnattfnatt”
- 2004 Best of Newspaper Design 2003. 1 Gold and 1 Award of Excellence
- 2003 Best of Newspaper Design 2002. 1 Gold and 1 Award of Excellence

== Solo exhibitions ==
- 2019 Exhibition: Fotografiska Stockholm "All Over"
- 2013 Exhibition: Darklands Berlin “Heavily Armed Souls”
- 2012 Exhibition: Skellefteå Konsthall “Waldersten365:64”
- 2012 Exhibition: Linnman Gallery “Royal Leftovers”
- 2011 Exhibition: Grafikens Hus “Den ganska långa vägen hit”
- 2011 Exhibition: Gallery Jonas Kleerup “Waldersten365”
- 2007 Exhibition: Kulturhuset Stockholm ”Here I Am”
- 2005 Exhibition: Frans Suell Malmö “Malmösviten”
- 2003 Exhibition: Färgfabriken “One Black Line”

== Exhibitions ==
- 2013 Don Gallery Shanghai “White Nights, Black Days”
- 2010 Braverman Gallery Tel Aviv “Worshipping the Sun” with Lars Tunbjörk and Christine Ödlund
- 2008 Färgfabriken North “Teleport Färgfabriken”
- 2001 “The New Europeans”
- 2000 Galleri Charlotte Lund. “People that don´t exist”
- 2000 Krapperups Konsthall 27/8-17/9 “The Art of Illustration”

== Book in selection ==
- 2014 “Allt Brinner!”, Kartago Förlag
- 2013 "Walderstens Instagram", Max Ström (bokförlag)
- 2012 "Kent Waldersten. Lägg er inte i!", Telegram Bokförlag
- 2011 "Waldersten365", Max Ström
- 2009 "Royal Leftovers"
- 2007 "Here I Am", Max Ström
- 2006 "Jesper Walderstens Painting Book", Max Ström
- 2004 "Full of Emptyness", Max Ström
