= Ansgar Almquist =

Swedish sculptor

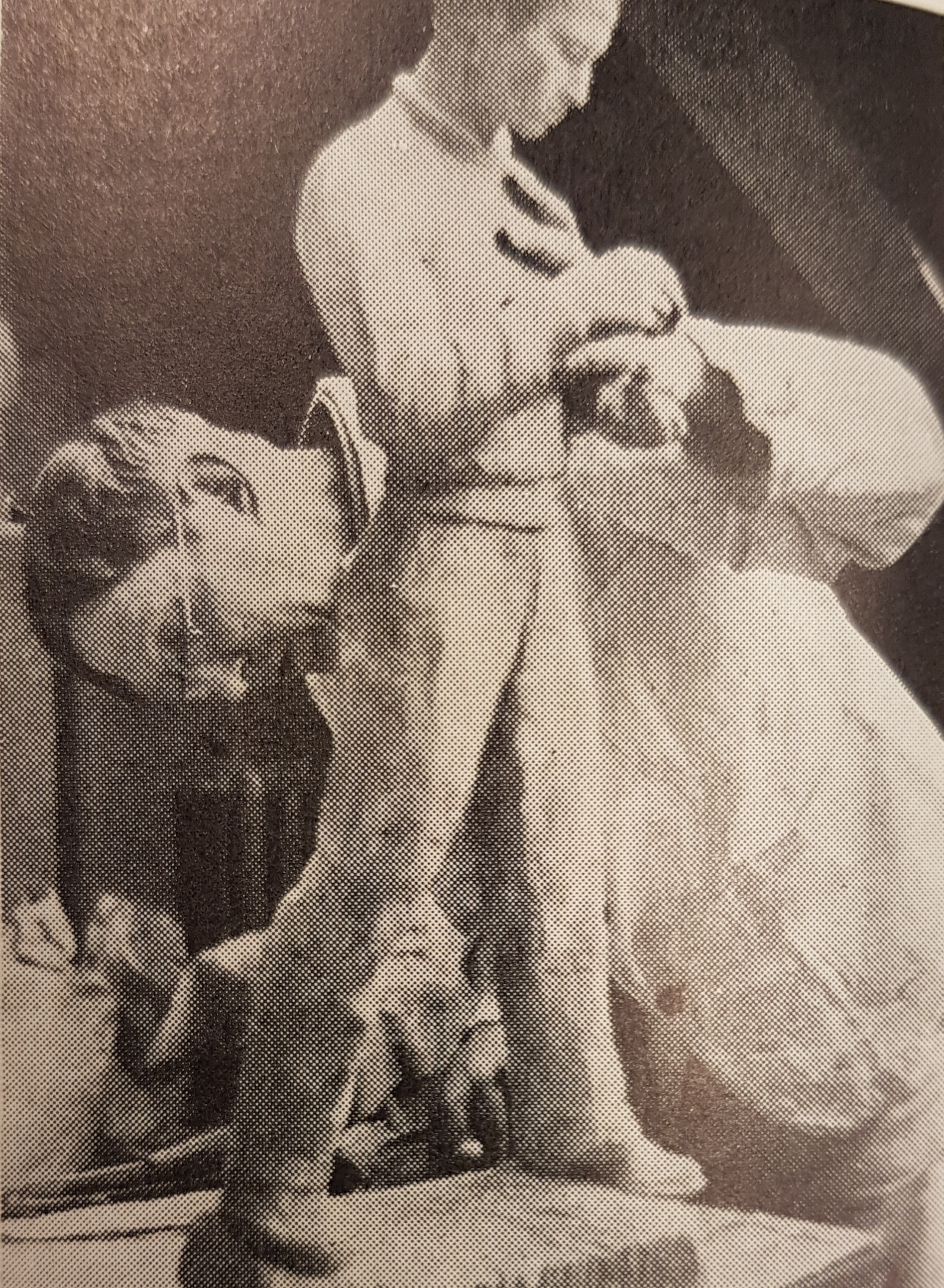
- Born: Kasper Ansgarius Almquist; 4 February 1889; Tranås Municipality, Sweden
- Died: 15 June 1973 (aged 84); Lidingö, Sweden
- Occupation: Sculptor

Kasper Ansgarius "Ansgar" Almquist (4 February 1889 – 15 June 1973) was a Swedish sculptor, primarily of freestanding figural bronzes.

== Early life and education ==
Born in Säby parish, now part of Tranås Municipality, to sales clerk Gustav Almquist and Augusta Åhman, Almquist was raised in the village of Åsen went to work for a furniture company when he was 14. In 1908 he began studying at the KTH Royal Institute of Technology in Stockholm; he continued in 1909 under the painter Carl Wilhelmson at Valand Academy in Gothenburg, and starting in 1910 in Paris, at the Académie Colarossi under Jean Antoine Injalbert and the École des Beaux-Arts. After the First World War, he returned to Europe in the 1920s on study tours in England, France, Germany and Italy.

== Career ==
Almquist established his studio in Stockholm. He received a number of commissions for public art, including for Stockholm City Hall (four sculptures for the courtyard façade), the Gothenburg Museum of Art, and the Stockholm Concert Hall (staircase sculptures and the lights and columns in the main hall), and also executed sculptures in wood for the interior of SS Kungsholm of the Holland America Line; Venus is now held by Sjöfartsmuseet Akvariet in Gothenburg. He exhibited frequently with the Swedish Association of Artists, and individually in Tranås in 1930 and in Norrköping in 1944. From 1931 to 1938 he taught at the Högre konstindustriella skolan in Stockholm and from 1945 at its successor, Konstfack.

His life-size bronze Gångaren (Race Walker) was part of the sculpture event in the art competition at the 1936 Summer Olympics.

== Personal life and death ==
Almquist married Sigrid Maria Löfgren in 1916. He died in 1973 in Lidingö on the island of the same name.

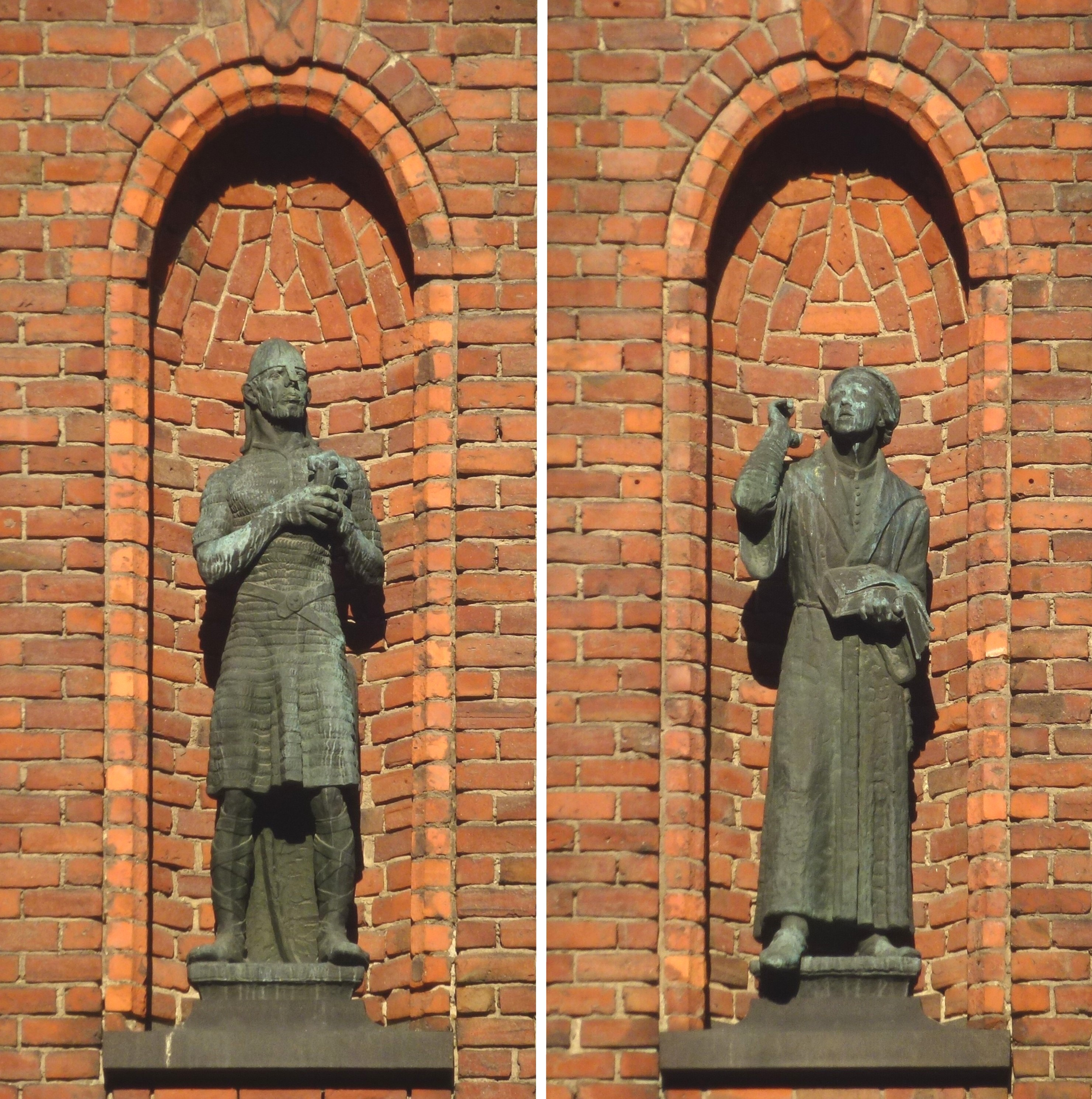
Statues of Olof Skötkonung (left) and Olaus Petri (right) at Stockholm City Hall

== Collections ==
Eriksbergs museum in Tranås exhibits a collection of his sculptures and some of the contents from his studio, and works by him have also been shown at Moderna Museet and Nationalmuseum in Stockholm and at the Norrköping Art Museum and the Gothenburg Museum of Art.

== Selected works ==
- Gångaren (Race Walker, 1936), Tidaholm
- Carl Linnaeus (1938), Lund
- Damen i dammen (1959), Skara
- Mälarstäderna, Stockholm City Hall
- Fiskarflickan, Stockholm County Museum
