= Milad Alami =

Swedish film director

- Born: May 14, 1982; Iran
- Education: National Film School of Denmark
- Occupation: Film director
- Years active: 2010–present
- Notable work: The Charmer (2017), Opponent (2023)
- Awards: Robert Award for Best Short Fiction/Animation (2016)

Milad Alami (born 14 May 1982) is a Swedish film director, currently based in Denmark.

Born in Iran, he and his family went to Sweden as refugees and he grew up in Skellefteå in the north of Sweden. He was educated at the National Film School of Denmark, and is currently based in Copenhagen.

His 2015 short film Mommy won the Robert Award for Best Short Fiction/Animation at the 33rd Robert Awards in 2016.

He released his feature-length debut The Charmer (Charmøren) in 2017, and followed up in 2023 with Opponent (Motståndaren).
