= Gertrud Almqvist =

Swedish writer and feminist

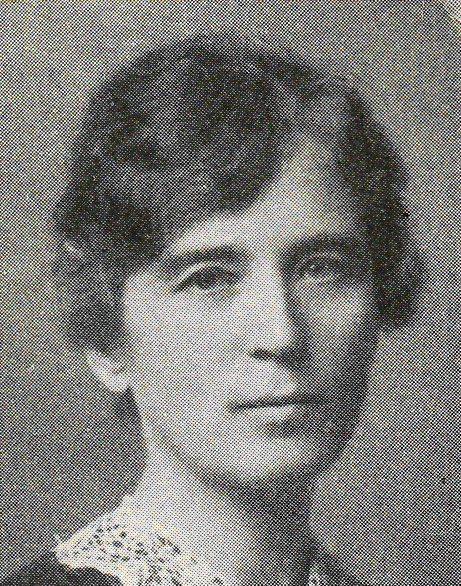
- Gertrud Almqvist
- Born: Gertrud Johanna Almqvist; 16 October 1875; Töreboda, Sweden
- Died: 24 June 1954 (aged 78); Gothenburg, Sweden
- Occupation: Writer
- Spouse: Per Axel Erik Brogren
- Parents: Edvard Almqvist; Thora Almqvist

Gertrud Johanna Almqvist (16 October 1875 – 24 June 1954) was a Swedish writer and feminist. Throughout her career, she wrote numerous books, particularly on the subject of women, and actively advocated for women's rights. Her works also portrayed female homosexual relationships.

== Life ==
Gertrud Almqvist was born on 16 October 1875 in Töreboda, Sweden. She was one of the two daughters of Edvard Almqvist, an agricultural engineer, and his wife Thora Almqvist. Almqvist was taught at home before completing her education in France and Switzerland, where she studied languages and literature.

In 1899, Almqvist published her first novel Genom brottsjöarna i hamn, which was shortly followed by her second novel När faller täckelset?, released the same year. Supported by Stockholms Dagblad's foreign stipend, she traveled across several European places. She began contributing literary reviews to newspapers and journals under an array of pseudonyms, including Madame Sans Gêne and Madame Mêre. In 1903, she was president of the women's association Nya Idun. From 1910 to 1912, Almqvist worked as a literary critic for the Swedish journal Idun, as well as contributed articles to Rösträtt för kvinnor on the subject of women's rights. Before the commencement of World War I, she published several books including, Ur en själs lif: efter funna anteckningar (1902), Den svenska kvinnan (1910), Boken om Erland Höök (1911), and Gwendolins brott och andra sägner från fattighäradet (1916). Almqvist married the translator and journalist Erik Brogren in 1917.

Almquist followed these books with Det törstande folket in 1919. Five years later, she published an anthology of short stories, entitled Den sällsamma resan: noveller. She released her last book, I tolfte timmen: en gammal, dåraktig kvinnas bekännelser in 1928 under the pen-name Molly Molander. The book featured the female protagonist Ronny having an affair with another woman. Her later works similarly focused on the themes of female homosexuality and lives of women after the First World War. She was liberal in the representation of same-sex relationships, and the issue of prejudice towards unmarried women frequently became the subject of her works.

Almquist died in Gothenburg, on 24 June 1954.

== Bibliography ==
- Genom brottsjöarna i hamn: svenskt original, 1899
- När faller täckelset?: svenskt original, 1899
- Ur en själs lif: efter funna anteckningar, 1902
- Den svenska kvinnan, 1910
- Boken om Erland Höök, 1911
- Gwendolins brott och andra sägner från fattighäradet, 1916
- Det törstande folket, 1919
- Den sällsamma resan: noveller, 1924
- I tolfte timmen: en gammal, dåraktig kvinnas bekännelser, 1928
