= Stockholm Academy of Dramatic Arts =

Location
- Sweden
- 59°20′21.94″N 18°6′4.37″E

Information
- Type: Film, radio, television and theatre
- Established: January 1, 2011
- Closed: 2014

The Stockholm Academy of Dramatic Arts (SADA) (Swedish: Stockholms dramatiska högskola) was a school within the Stockholm University of the Arts that offers a University Diploma in Performing Arts and Media. SADA was Sweden’s largest school of film, radio, television and theatre.

On January 1, 2011 SADA was formed via the merger of the Swedish Institute of Dramatic Art and the Teaterhögskolan i Stockholm (Swedish National Academy of Dramatic Arts/Stockholm Academy. In 2014, SADA became part of Stockholm University of the Arts, and the previous name is now no longer in use.

The diploma programmes consisted of three years of full-time studies leading to a bachelor's degree. Courses provided practical production and team-exercises. The programmes concentrated mainly on practical work, but also included theory. Continual contact with professionals and professional work was maintained by means of guest lecturers, study visits, and co-productions with other institutions, film companies, radio teams, and theatres. SADA also offered postgraduate courses, as well as shorter courses for professionals already working within the field of theatre and media.
