= Duhok International Film Festival =

Kudish film festival

Duhok International Film Festival فلمه‌ فێستیڤالا دهوك یا ناڤده‌وله‌تی
- Opening film: 9 December 2025
- Closing film: 16 December 2025
- Location: Duhok, Kurdistan Region, Iraq
- Established: 2011
- Awards: Yilmaz Guney Award Golden leaf Silver leaf
- Directors: Amir Ali (Current)
- Artistic director: Shawkat Amin Korki (Current)
- Language: English
- Website: https://duhokiff.com/

The Duhok International Film Festival (Duhok IFF) (Kurdish: فلمه‌ فێستیڤالا دهوك یا ناڤده‌وله‌تی) is an annual film festival held in Duhok, Kurdistan Region. Each year Duhok IFF presents new and exciting cinema from the Kurdish Cinema and beyond. The 11th edition was held from December 9 to 16, 2024 which focused on Indian cinema.

== Overview ==
The festival aims to showcase innovative films of high artistic value with a notable handwriting made throughout the world. It shall work as a pinnacle point for all wishing to learn more about the possibilities the Kurdish regions have to offer. Duhok IFF wishes to create an atmosphere of exchange between different cultures and human values. Unique film experiences can be made and people can share their thirst for new discoveries and a passion for cinema in all its diversity.

A major task of the festival is to build a bridge between Kurdish film production and worldwide filmmaking. It wishes to create a launch platform for films from Kurdistan, taking the pulse of new tendencies and offering the opportunity to explore a terrain opening up in contemporary filmmaking. As a unique festival in this region, it understands itself as a force for new talents and meeting place for up and coming filmmakers.

== Organizers ==
The Duhok International Film Festival is organized by the Kurdistan Regional Government's Ministry of Culture and Youth, General Directorate of Culture and Arts of Duhok City and the Cinema Directorate of Duhok in cooperation with Mîtosfilm Berlin.

== Film Program ==
WORLD CINEMA COMPETITION

Narrative films from filmmakers around the world that offers a panorama of contemporary auteur cinema includes films by young talents alongside work by established filmmakers, competing for Yilmaz Guney Award and the New Talent Award.

WORLD CINEMA VISION

Non-competitive section dedicated to showing outstanding feature, short, and documentary films that offer broad cinematic viewpoints and the world emerging cinema vision.

WORLD DOCUMENTARIES

A competitive section showcasing the world documentary films of independent cinema.

WORLD SHORTS

A competitive section showcasing narrative short films from all over the world.

KURDISH CINEMA COMPETITION

A peak into the various styles and visions within Kurdish cinema, highlighting the films of this year's most talented Kurdish filmmakers as well as the work of established Kurdish directors.

KURDISH SHORTS

A competitive section showcasing the year's most original voices of Kurdish short films.

KURDISH DOCUMENTARIES

A competitive section offers a look at Kurdish documentary films illuminating the ideas, people, events, and culture that shapes the Kurds life.

FOCUS COUNTRY

Each year the Duhok International Film Festival brings certain talent from different countries into focus, aiming to create a network with the country in spotlight. In the previous years Duhok iFF presented Italian (2012), German (2013), French (2015), Nordic cinema (2016).(2017 ) South Korea. (2018) Armenia and in (2019) Arab cinema, 2021 Afghanistan, 2022 Sweden, 2023 France, and 2024 India.

KURDISH CINEMA PANORAMA

Non-competitive section showcasing Kurdish films of the year, including feature, shorts and documentaries.

NUHAT

With the NUHAT project, the Goethe-Institut Iraq in cooperation with the Duhok IFF contributes to strengthening the capacities of young emerging filmmakers. The project aims to support the development of crisis-proof models for film production in the long term. In a tensive training program, filmmakers from across the Kurdistan region and Iraq are invited to develop their skills in directing, script writing, cinematography and screenwriting. The program culminates in a week-long classroom workshop at Duhok IFF, where participants develop their own project ideas into mature film productions in collaboration with other participants. The project ideas are pitched to a jury and the best ideas are selected for seed funding by Duhok IFF and the Goethe Institut-Irak

== Official Prizes ==
Since its foundation, the Duhok International Film Festival have honored many Kurdish and International film-makers and talent. The competition and awards have raised the profile of the winners and made Duhok IFF a destination to discover the best of the region's cinema.

=== World Cinema Competition ===
- Yılmaz Güney Award for Best Feature Film — $10,000
- New Talent Award for Best First or Second Feature Director — $3,000
- Golden Leaf for Best World Documentary Film — $3,000
- Golden Leaf for Best World Short Film — $2,000

KURDISH CINEMA COMPETITION

- Golden Leaf Award for Best Feature Film — $5,000
- Silver Leaf Award for Best Director — $3,000
- Silver Leaf Award for Best Actor — $2,000
- Silver Leaf Award for Best Actress — $2,000
- Silver Leaf Award for Best Kurdish Script — $2,000
- Silver Leaf Award for Best Cinematographer — $1,500
- Golden Leaf for Best Kurdish Documentary Film — $3,000
- Golden Leaf for Best Kurdish Short Film — $2,000
- Special Prize of the Jury — $1,000

OTHER AWARDS

- FIPRESCI Award for a Kurdish Feature Film.

NUHAT AWARDS

- $5,000 to the Best project.
- $3,000 to the second-best project
- $2,000 to the third best project
