= Til You're Home =

Single by Rita Wilson with Sebastián Yatra

from the album A Man Called Otto (Original Motion Picture Soundtrack)
- Released: December 2, 2022
- Genre: Soft rock
- Length: 3:05
- Label: Universal Music; Sing It Loud
- Songwriters: David Hodges; Rita Wilson

Rita Wilson singles chronology
"Fire" (2022)	"Til You're Home" (2022)

Music video
- Til You're Home on YouTube

"Til You're Home" is a song performed by American actress and singer Rita Wilson with Colombian singer Sebastián Yatra as a single for the soundtrack of the 2022 comedy-drama film A Man Called Otto. It was written by Wilson and David Hodges, and released on December 2, 2022.

== Background ==
After seeing a screener of the 2015 Swedish film A Man Called Ove, which was based on the novel of the same name by Fredrik Backman, Rita Wilson spent five years producing and developing an American adaptation, through her production company Artistic Films, to star her husband Tom Hanks. During pre-production for A Man Called Otto, director Marc Forster asked Wilson to write a song for the film. The resulting song, "Til You're Home", was written by Wilson and David Hodges. After hearing him on the Encanto soundtrack, Wilson asked Sebastián Yatra to appear on the track with her. The song is produced by Wilson and Matt Rollings.

The song is based on themes from the film, of aging, death, hope, love, loss, and the meaning of home. It was inspired in part by a conversation Wilson had with director Mike Nichols after her father died, about continuing to converse with a loved one after they die.

== Release ==
The song and music video were released on December 2, 2022. The music video features Wilson and Yatra, as well as footage from the film. The soundtrack for A Man Called Otto, featuring "Til You're Home" along with composer Thomas Newman's score, was released on Decca Records on December 30, 2022.

== Accolades ==
"Til You're Home" was nominated for Best Song – Independent Film at the 2022 Hollywood in Music Media Awards. On December 21, 2022, it was announced that the song had been shortlisted for the Academy Award for Best Original Song at the 95th Academy Awards, but it wasn’t nominated.

== Credits and personnel ==
Credits adapted from YouTube.

- Rita Wilson - vocals, songwriting, production
- Sebastián Yatra - vocals
- David Hodges - songwriting
- Matt Rollings - production, piano, celesta, background vocals
- George Doering - acoustic guitar
- David Levita - electric guitar
- Sean Hurley - bass
- Victor Indrizzo - drums
- Kristin Wilkinson - viola
- Alma Fernandez - viola
- Charlie Bisharat - violin
- Alyssa Park - violin
- Sara Parkins - violin
- Jacob Braun - cello
- Giovanna Clayton - cello
- Niko Bolas - recording, mixing
- Ted Jensen - mastering
- Void Stryker - additional vocal production
