= Anxious People =

2019 novel by Fredrik Backman

- First edition
- Author: Fredrik Backman
- Original title: Folk med ångest
- Language: Swedish
- Genre: Novel
- Publisher: Forum (Swedish)
- Publication date: 2019
- Publication place: Sweden
- English publication date: 6 July 2021
- Media type: Print
- ISBN: 9789179130268

Anxious People (original title in Swedish: Folk med ångest) is a novel by Swedish writer Fredrik Backman published by Forum in 2019. The novel was published in English in 2021.

It was adapted into a Netflix television series of the same name, which premiered on 29 December 2021.

== Plot summary ==
Ten years ago, a man lost all his savings due to a financial crash. He visited a financial banker named Zara and asked for advice, but she flatly said it was his fault for giving the bank his money. The man wrote a letter to her before taking his own life by jumping off the bridge.

In the present day, a bank robber tries to rob a bank to get enough money to pay for rent, so his children won't be taken away. Unfortunately, it is a cashless bank, so the bank robber panics and runs to a nearby apartment building to avoid being caught by the police. The bank robber enters an apartment viewing, and the people inside see the robber's pistol and assume that it is a robbery. The bank robber hesitantly accepts that he is taking the people hostage as he tries to maintain order.

The hostages are apartment renovators Anna-Lena and Roger, expecting mothers Julia and Ro, an elderly Estelle, and bank owner Zara. They find a man named Lennart wearing a bunny suit inside the bathroom. Anna-Lena admits that she hired Lennart to cause a commotion to lower the bidding price of other prospective buyers, in order to make Roger believe that he negotiated the price himself. They split up in silence, as Roger had taken pride in his negotiation skills.

Ro follows Roger and admits to him that the reason she nitpicks every apartment her wife Julia brings her to is because she fears she isn't ready to be a parent. Roger assures her that she'll be a good mother and encourages her to buy the apartment. Anna-Lena tells Julia that she fears Roger hates her for deceiving him, but Julia promises her that all couples show their love to their spouses in unconventional ways. A standoffish Zara looks at the bridge from the apartment's balcony and complains about human greed and economic systems to Lennart. When all the hostages regroup, Roger tells Julia that Ro is excited and nervous to be a mother, and Julia tells Roger that he is enough and that Anna-Lena still loves him.

The bank robber apologizes for keeping them hostage and says he will free them and turn themself in. However, the hostages argue that they simply made a mistake to protect their children, and that they all agree to lie in their witness statements to protect them. Estelle reveals that the apartment they're currently in is actually her apartment, and that she posed as one of the buyers to sell it to someone who deserved it. She gives the bank robber the key to a neighboring apartment to hide in when the police arrive. The bank robber thanks the hostages for being kind.

Jim is the first police to reach the apartment. The bank robber turns himself in and tells Jim the whole truth of why he robbed the bank. Jim feels sympathy for the bank robber and agrees to help the bank robber avoid capture. The bank robber releases the hostages and hides in a neighboring apartment. Jim's son, Jack, also a policeman, interviews the hostages and is frustrated when they play dumb. A series of coincidences lead Jack to believe that the bank robber is still hiding in the apartment. Jim tells the truth to his son, and they reconcile.

In the end, the bank robber moves in with Estelle in her apartment, and her children visit them every other week. Julia and Ro move into a neighboring apartment and have a baby boy. Anna-Lena and Roger take up a new hobby. Zara starts a relationship with Lennart and works up the courage to read the letter from the man who jumped off the bridge ten years ago. It reads "It wasn't your fault." and she finally lets go of her guilt.

== Reception ==
The Washington Post said that "Backman again captures the messy essence of being human." USA Today described the novel as "about how kindness and compassion count so much in surviving each day – a lesson for our times." People (magazine) praised the novel as "A quirky, big-hearted novel. Wry, wise and often laugh-out-loud funny". The Washington Independent Review of Books expressed that the book was "A delightfully witty tale of disparate characters caught in a Rube Goldberg-like narrative." Kirkus Reviews named it as "a story with both comedy and heartbreak sure to please Backman fans." The book was the runner-up in the 2020 Goodreads Choice Awards for the "Fiction" category.

== Adaptations ==
The novel was adapted into a six-part miniseries, which premiered on Netflix on 29 December 2021. A film adaptation starring Angelina Jolie was selling to distributors at the 2025 Cannes Film Festival. The film will be directed by Marc Forster and written by David Magee. Both have done an adaptation of another book from Backman, A Man Called Ove. Black Bear Pictures is handling international sales.
