= Anxious People (film) =

American comedy film

- Directed by: Marc Forster
- Screenplay by: David Magee
- Based on: Anxious People by Fredrik Backman
- Produced by: Fredrik Wikström Nicastro; Renée Wolfe
- Starring: Angelina Jolie; Aimee Lou Wood; Jason Segel; Carol Kane; Stephanie Allynne; Joanna Scanlan; Lennie James; Jessica Gunning; Solly McLeod; Kai Alexander
- Cinematography: Nicolas Karakatsanis
- Music by: Thomas Newman
- Production companies: Black Bear Pictures; Hope Studios; 2DUX²; World Wide Word
- Country: United States
- Language: English

Anxious People is an upcoming American comedy film directed by Marc Forster and written by David Magee, based on the 2019 novel by Fredrik Backman. It stars Angelina Jolie, Aimee Lou Wood, Jason Segel, Carol Kane, Stephanie Allynne, Joanna Scanlan, Lennie James, and Jessica Gunning.

== Cast ==
- Angelina Jolie as Zara
- Aimee Lou Wood as Grace
- Jason Segel
- Carol Kane
- Stephanie Allynne
- Joanna Scanlan
- Lennie James
- Jessica Gunning
- Solly McLeod
- Kai Alexander

== Production ==
The film, directed by Marc Forster, is an adaptation of the novel Anxious People by Fredrik Backman (2019), with screenplay written by David Magee. Both Forster and Magee previously worked on a feature film adaptation of another book from Backman, A Man Called Ove. Fredrik Wikström Nicastro and Renée Wolfe of 2DUX² are producers on the film which has been developed and financed by Hope Studios. The cast is led by Angelina Jolie and Aimee Lou Wood.

Principal photography began on September 2, 2025, at Pinewood Studios in London, when Jason Segel joined the cast. Carol Kane, Stephanie Allynne, Joanna Scanlan, Lennie James, and Jessica Gunning joined the cast later that month, with Solly McLeod joining in October and Kai Alexander after.
