= Audie Award for Fiction Narrator =

Literary award for audiobook

The Audie Award for Fiction Narrator is one of the Audie Awards presented annually by the Audio Publishers Association (APA). It awards excellence in audiobook narration for a fiction audiobook released in a given year.

Established in 2024, the category replaced the categories for Best Male and Female Narrator, alongside the award for Best Non-Fiction Narrator.

== Recipients ==
Award Year	Audiobook	Author(s)	Narrator(s)	Publisher	Result	Ref.
2024 29th	The Last Lifeboat	Hazel Gaynor	Billie Fulford-Brown	Penguin Random House Audio	Winner	
2024 29th	Land of Milk and Honey	C Pam Zhang	Eunice Wong	Penguin Random House Audio	Finalist	
2024 29th	The Eyes and the Impossible	Dave Eggers	Ethan Hawke	Listening Library	Finalist	
2024 29th	Johanna Porter Is Not Sorry	Sara Read	Marni Penning	Harlequin Audio	Finalist	
2024 29th	Tom Lake (2023)	Ann Patchett	Meryl Streep	HarperAudio	Finalist	
2025 30th	The Women (2024)	Kristin Hannah	Julia Whelan	Macmillan Audio	Winner	
2025 30th	Margo's Got Money Troubles	Rufi Thorpe	Elle Fanning	HarperAudio	Finalist	
2025 30th	Great Expectations (1860-61)	Charles Dickens	Stephen Fry	SNR Audio Ltd.	Finalist	
2025 30th	James (2024)	Percival Everett	Dominic Hoffman	Penguin Random House Audio	Finalist	
2025 30th	The Briar Club	Kate Quinn	Saskia Maarleveld	HarperAudio	Finalist	
2026 31st	Outlander (1991)	Diana Gabaldon	Kristin Atherton	Recorded Books	Winner	
2026 31st	Lonesome Dove (1985)	Larry McMurtry	Will Patton	Simon & Schuster Audio	Finalist	
2026 31st	My Friends	Fredrik Backman	Marin Ireland	Simon & Schuster Audio	Finalist	
2026 31st	Red Clay	Charles B. Fancher	Dion Graham	Blackstone Publishing	Finalist	
2026 31st	The Sideways Life of Denny Voss	Holly Kennedy	Andrew Eiden	Brilliance Publishing	Finalist	
