= A Man Called Ove =

A Man Called Ove may refer to:

- A Man Called Ove (novel), 2012 by Fredrik Backman
- A Man Called Ove (film), 2015 adaptation of the novel

== See also ==
- A Man Called Otto, a 2022 English-language re-make of the film
