= Britt-Marie Was Here =

2014 novel by Fredrik Backman

- First edition (Swedish)
- Author: Fredrik Backman
- Original title: Britt-Marie var här
- Language: Swedish
- Genre: Novel
- Publisher: Partners in Stories
- Publication date: 2014
- Publication place: Sweden
- English publication date: May 3, 2016
- Media type: Print
- Pages: 336 pp (US)
- ISBN: 9781501142536

Britt-Marie Was Here (Swedish: Britt-Marie var här) is the fourth book by the Swedish columnist, blogger, and writer Fredrik Backman. The novel was originally published in 2014, and was later translated to English and published on May 3, 2016. The main character, Britt-Marie, was featured in Backman's third book, My Grandmother Asked Me to Tell You She’s Sorry. The novel was also made into a film of the same title, featuring Pernilla August in the title role and directed by Tuva Novotny.

== Plot ==
The plot of the novel focuses on a "nag-hag" woman who has recently left her cheating husband and has taken on a job in the city of Borg, working at the recreation center. The city itself is barely a full town, with only a pizzeria and a florist shop open. There, Britt-Marie finds herself responsible for a group of children in an impoverished area of town in need of revamping. Britt-Marie's husband, Kent, and her new romantic interest, Sven, compete for her attention. Sami, Vega, and Omar challenge the notion of typical home life. Somebody, a 40-year-old alcoholic, runs the hub of the city out of the local pizza shop and occasionally dabbles in selling illegal goods.

== Reception ==
Kirkus Reviews described the novel as feeling, "clunky and contrived, something the earlier books narrowly avoided. Backman has always played fast and loose with internal logic; without the smart pacing displayed in his previous books, the problem is more glaring here." Ani Johnson of Bookbag, on the other hand, gave the book five stars while adding "this is a novel that deserves many, many more". Johnson also praised the author "who understands people and watches society closely"

== Adaptations ==
A film adaptation, starring Pernilla August and directed by Tuva Novotny, was released in 2019.
