= Anxious People (TV series) =

2021 Swedish television series

- Swedish: Folk med ångest
- Genre: Comedy; Drama
- Based on: Anxious People by Fredrik Backman
- Written by: Fredrik Backman
- Directed by: Felix Herngren
- Starring: Leif Andrée; Marika Lagercrantz; Per Andersson; Lottie Ejebrant; Anna Granath
- Composer: Adam Nordén
- Country of origin: Sweden
- Original language: Swedish
- No. of seasons: 1
- No. of episodes: 6

Production
- Executive producers: Fredrik Backman; Neda Backman; Pontus Edgren; Martina Håkansson; Tor Jonasson
- Producer: Anna Carlsten
- Production locations: Stockholm, Sweden
- Cinematography: Viktor Davidsson
- Editor: Henrik Källberg
- Running time: 23–34 minutes
- Production company: FLX

Original release
- Network: Netflix
- Release: 29 December 2021

Anxious People (Swedish: Folk med ångest) is a 2021 Swedish comedy drama television series directed by Felix Herngren and based on the novel of the same name by Fredrik Backman. It stars Leif Andrée, Marika Lagercrantz, Per Andersson, Lottie Ejebrant, and Anna Granath.

== Synopsis ==
A bank robber holds up an open house, before disappearing. A father-and-son team of inept cops investigates.

== Cast and characters ==
- Leif Andrée as Roger
- Marika Lagercrantz as Anna-Lena
- Per Andersson as Lennart
- Lottie Ejebrant as Estelle
- Anna Granath as Zarah
- Elina Du Rietz as Linda
- Dan Ekborg as Jim
- Sascha Zacharias as Liv
- Carla Sehn as Julia
- Alfred Svensson as Jack
- Petrina Solange as Ro

== Reception ==
Anxious People was met with a positive response from critics. John Doyle of The Globe and Mail wrote, "It's a classic example of a Netflix surprise: The premise seems simple, it being about a hostage-taking after a bank robbery goes awry, but there is wit and poignancy in it and its odd, distinctly Swedish artfulness." Joel Keller of Decider wrote, "Anxious People manages to be funny and poignant and keep a balance between the two. As the mystery gets investigated and we get to know the hostages, we hope that the show should be able to achieve that same balance."
