= Fredrik Wikström Nicastro =

Swedish film producer

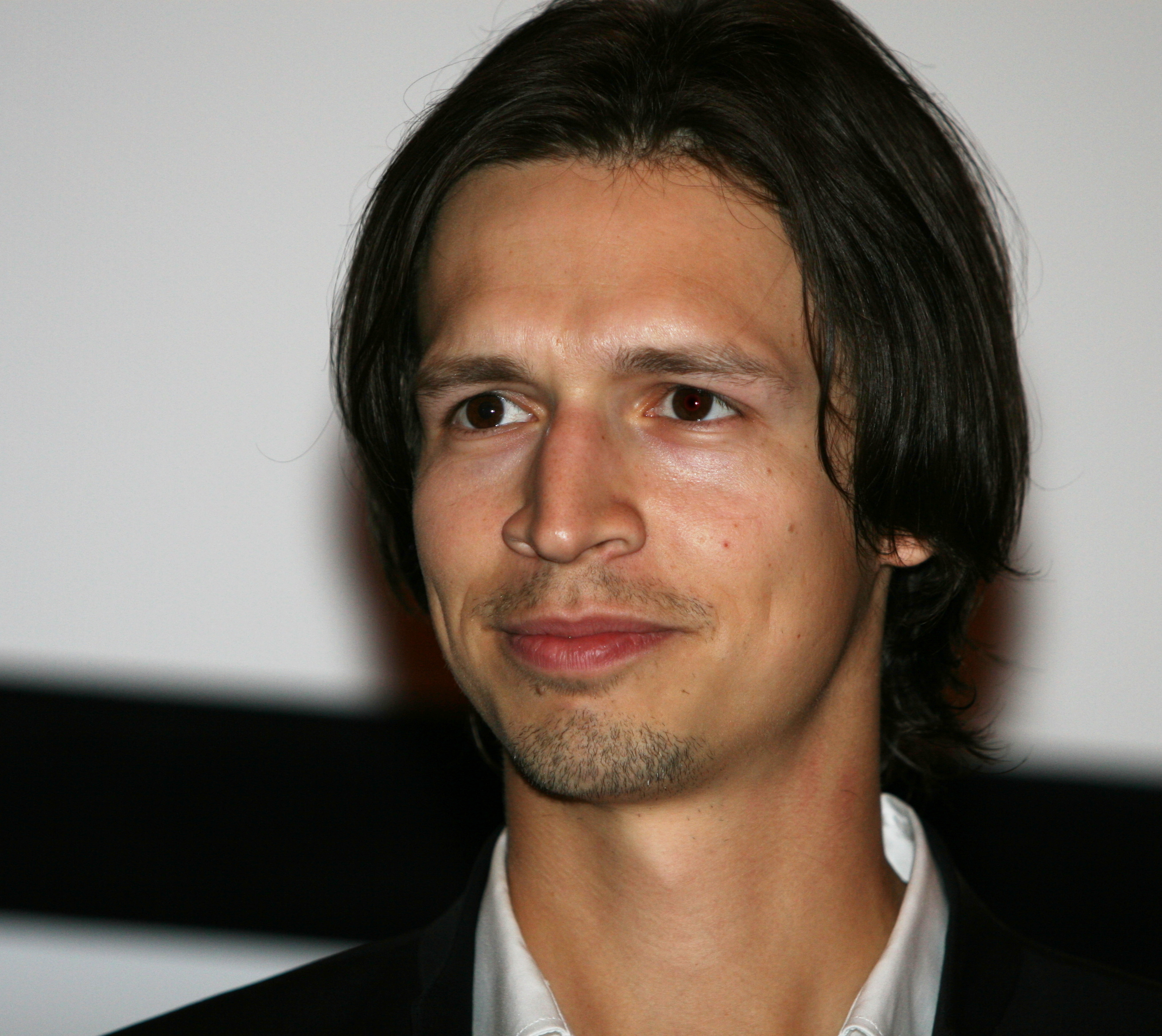
- Fredrik Wikström Nicastro in 2008
- Born: Fredrik Wikström Nicastro; 24 August 1978 (age 47); Skellefteå, Sweden
- Occupation: Film producer

Fredrik Wikström Nicastro is a Swedish film producer and CEO and founder of Hope Studios, a European film studio with the mission to bring hope and inspiration to people everywhere.

== Career ==
Fredrik was the producer of A Man Called Otto, starring Tom Hanks which grossed 115 Million dollar worldwide. He was producer and co-writer of the award-winning thriller Easy Money in 2010. The film was a huge success in Sweden and internationally. It was presented by Martin Scorsese to the US audience where it has received 85% fresh on Rotten Tomatoes. The film launched two successful and critically acclaimed sequels that Fredrik also produced and co-wrote. A spin off TV-series was also produced for Netflix, on which Fredrik served as Executive Producer.

Fredrik has also produced and served as executive producer/co-producer on films such as Anxious People, The Night House , the Oscar nominated hit A Man Called Ove, the 2017 opening film of Toronto Filmfestival Borg vs McEnroe, Horizon Line, starring Allison Williams and Alexander Dreymon Bamse och Tjuvstaden, Bolgen and The Emigrants, directed by Erik Poppe.and Pojken med Guldbyxorna.
