= Ning-tsu Malmqvist =

Chinese-Swedish educator, translator, and culinary writer

Ning-tsu Malmqvist (née Ch'en; Chinese: 陳寧祖; June 9, 1931 – November 5, 1996.) was a Chinese-Swedish cultural intermediary, translator, author, and educator. Born in Beijing and raised in Chengdu, Sichuan, she was one of the founding members in the Department of Chinese at Stockholm University. Beyond her work as an educator of Chinese language and heritage, she was a figure in translating Chinese culture for the Swedish public. She was one of the few non-European people to appear in the Swedish public sphere during the mid-20th century, notably through her 1972 and 1980 cookbooks and televised demonstrations as early as 1967.

== Early life ==
Ning-tsu Ch'en was born in 1931 in Beijing but grew up in Chengdu, the capital of Sichuan province. Her father, Ch'en Hsing-k'o, was a professor, and her mother, Liu K'o-chuang, was a school principal.

In 1948, Swedish sinology student Göran Malmqvist arrived in Chengdu on a Rockefeller Fellowship to study Chinese dialects, and lodged with the Ch'en family. The two married on 24 September 1950 at Tao Fong Shan Christian Centre (道風山) in Hong Kong.

== Career ==
=== Academic ===
Malmqvist served as a tutor in the Department of Chinese Language and Literature, Faculty of Oriental Studies, at the Australian National University, Canberra.

In 1965, Göran Malmqvist was appointed Professor of Sinology at Stockholm University. Together, they established the newly created Department of Chinese within the Faculty of Oriental Languages. She taught Chinese there from the department's founding until her retirement, teaching generations of Swedish students the Chinese language and culture, including Torbjörn Lodén, the head of the Stockholm China Center.

Malmqvist co-translated Zhang Xianliang's novel Half the man is the woman into Swedish with Lena Jönsson, and co-edited Leva i Kina: 45 kineser berättar öppenhjärtigt om sig själva (Tr: Living in China: 45 Chinese people talk candidly about themselves) with Göran Malmqvist (Forum, 1988) and edited a collection of Chinese short stories in 1977.

=== Culinary ===
In 1967, she made a landmark appearance on Swedish television demonstrating Chinese cooking in Swedish. This represented one of the earliest instances of a non-European cultural intermediary presenting their heritage to Swedish audience, predating the country's shift toward multiculturalism. At a time when the Swedish palate was highly homogenized and access to East Asian spices was severely limited, her work represented a foundational act of cultural translation. Malmqvist authored two foundational cookbooks that adapted traditional Sichuanese methods to locally available Swedish ingredients: Att äta med pinnar i Sverige (Forum, 1972) and Ningtsus kinesiska kokbok (Forum, 1980). These works served as essential cultural and pedagogical guides, introducing the philosophy of Chinese gastronomy to a predominantly monocultural Swedish society

== Family ==
Ning-tsu Malmqvist and Göran Malmqvist lived in London, New York, Beijing, and Canberra before eventually moving back to Stockholm. They had three sons: Anders, Per and Gunnar. She died of cancer in Stockholm on 5 November 1996.

== Legacy ==
Ning-tsu Malmqvist's cookbook Att äta med pinnar i Sverige, originally published in 1972, was reprinted in 2011. Her culinary legacy has been continued by her family through Ningtsus Sichuanolja, a Sichuan chili oil distributed across Stockholm and Mälardalen.
