= Britt-Marie Was Here (film) =

2019 comedy-drama film from Tuva Novotny

- Film poster
- Swedish: Britt-Marie var här
- Directed by: Tuva Novotny
- Written by: Anders Frithiof August; Fredrik Backman; Øystein Karlsen; Tuva Novotny
- Produced by: Gustav Oldén; Nicklas Wikström Nicastro
- Starring: Pernilla August; Peter Haber; Anders Mossling; Malin Levanon; Vera Vitali
- Cinematography: Jonas Alarik
- Edited by: Morten Egholm; Håkan Karlsson; Frederik Strunk
- Music by: Ginge Anvik
- Production company: SF Studios
- Distributed by: Cohen Film Collection
- Release date: September 20, 2019
- Running time: 94 minutes
- Country: Sweden
- Languages: Swedish; German
- Box office: $371,000

Britt-Marie Was Here (Swedish: Britt-Marie var här) is a 2019 Swedish comedy-drama film directed by Tuva Novotny based on Fredrik Backman's 2014 novel of the same name. Produced by Gustav Oldén and Nicklas Wikström Nicastro, the film stars Pernilla August, Peter Haber, Anders Mossling, Malin Levanon, and Vera Vitali. The plot follows the titular protagonist Britt-Marie, a 63-year-old homemaker played by August, who leaves her cheating husband of 40 years and reluctantly takes on a job as a youth soccer coach in the remote town of Borg.

Critics received the film with mixed reviews − some criticized the plot as predictable, while others praised the portrayal of self-discovery and performance of August. At the 55th Guldbagge Awards, August received a nomination for Best Actress in a Leading Role.

== Plot ==
63-year old homemaker Britt-Marie lives a mundane life. Meticulously organized, she follows the same routine every day: making lists, cleaning windows, doing the laundry, preparing dinner for her husband of 40 years, Kent, who barely notices her. When her husband travels for work, she stays at home where she feels safe. When her husband has a heart-attack, Britt-Marie finds a mistress by his side at the hospital and discovers that he has been unfaithful. Disappointed, Britt-Marie returns home, packs her bags, and heads out to make her own life. She travels to the remote Swedish town of Borg, where she reluctantly accepts the only temporary job she is offered, coaching a local soccer team of 10-year-olds. Despite having no knowledge of soccer, Britt-Marie tries her best to train the group and make a better life for herself.

== Cast ==
- Pernilla August as Britt-Marie
- Peter Haber as Kent
- Anders Mossling as Sven
- Malin Levanon as Bank
- Vera Vitali as Anna
- Mahmut Suvakci as Memo
- Olle Sarri as Fredik
- Lancelot Ncube as Sami

== Reception ==
On the review aggregator website Rotten Tomatoes, 71% of 21 critics' reviews are positive, with an average rating of 6.4/10. Metacritic, which uses a weighted average, assigned the film a score of 50 out of 100 based on seven critics, indicating "mixed or average reviews".

Contemporary critics praised the film for its sentimental portrayal of self-discovery of a mature woman. Pernilla August was praised for her performance in the lead role, with David Lewis from San Francisco Chronicle calling it "dryly funny, but also subtly affecting" and found it refreshing "to watch her heart and mind slowly but surely open up to life's possibilities". The New York Times's critic Tea Bugbee praised August's "restrained performance", describing the film as "a relatively unchallenging yet ultimately pleasant watch". Trevor Johnston, in his piece for Radio Times believed that August was the film's "real star performer", arguing that "her deftly measured approach pays strong emotional dividends". Giving the film a B-grade rating, The Boston Herald reviewer James Verniere complimented the works of the actors. He singled out the character of "Bank" played by Levinsonas as one of the "most memorable characters", and described the film as a "story of reinvention that "adjust[s] to whatever life throws at us at whatever age".

Reviewers criticized the plot as predictable. Los Angeles Times's writer Gary Goldstein said that the movie felt "engaging and relatable" at times, though he added that it "never work[ed] up the requisite head of steam". Meanwhile, Thomas Floyd of Washington Post described the characters as "likable, intriguing and, for the most part, a tad underdeveloped", and felt that the story could have benefited "from a more padded runtime". In a more critical review, Aftonbladet writer Karolina Fjellborg panned the performance of the actors and the narrative of the film.

At the 55th Guldbagge Awards, August received a nomination for Best Actress in a Leading Role.
