= Rita Wilson =

American actress, singer, and producer (born 1956)

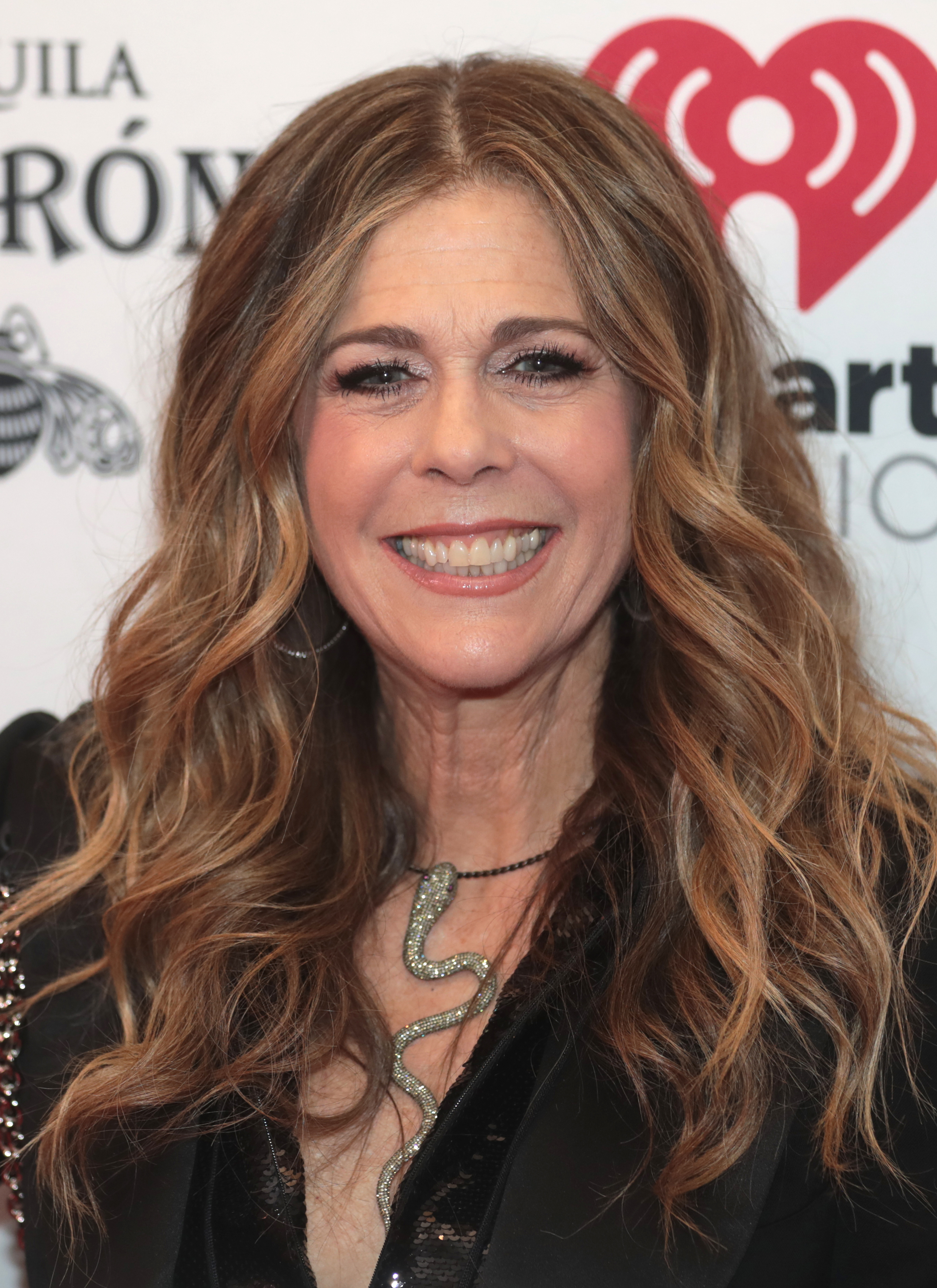
- Wilson in 2019
- Born: Margarita Ibrahimoff; October 26, 1956 (age 70); Los Angeles, California, US
- Citizenship: United States; Greece (2019; honorary)
- Occupations: Actress; singer; producer
- Years active: 1972–present
- Spouse: Tom Hanks (m. 1988)
- Children: 2, including Chet
- Musical career
- Genre: Country
- Label: Sing It Loud Records

Margarita “Rita” Wilson Hanks (born Margarita Ibrahimoff; October 26, 1956) is an American actress, singer, and producer. Her film appearances include Volunteers (1985), Sleepless in Seattle (1993), Now and Then (1995), That Thing You Do! (1996), Jingle All the Way (1996), The Story of Us (1999), Runaway Bride (1999), It's Complicated (2009), and Larry Crowne (2011), and she appeared in the television series The Good Wife and Girls. Wilson has also performed on Broadway and produced several films, including My Big Fat Greek Wedding (2002). As a singer-songwriter, Wilson has released the albums AM/FM, Rita Wilson, Bigger Picture, Halfway to Home, and Sound of a Woman. In March 2019, she received a star on the Hollywood Walk of Fame.

== Early life ==
Wilson was born Margarita Ibrahimoff on October 26, 1956, in Hollywood. Her mother, Dorothea Tzigkou (Greek: Δωροθέα Τζίγκου), was an ethnic Greek, raised in Sotirë near Dropull i Sipërm in Albania, close to the border with Greece. Her father, Hassan Halilov Ibrahimoff (Bulgarian: Хасан Халилов Ибрахимов; 1920–2009), was a Bulgarian Muslim (Pomak) born in Oraio (Breshtene), Greece, close to the border with Bulgaria. Her father's family moved to Bulgaria when he was a child. He later tried to leave Bulgaria several times, but was caught and placed in a labor camp that had a coal mine. He managed to escape the camp, however, with a friend. He and the friend managed to make it to New York, arriving in 1949. He converted from Islam to Orthodox Christianity upon his marriage and changed his name to Allan Wilson in 1960, choosing his name after a local street. The family lived in Los Angeles, where Rita Wilson's father worked as a bartender. Wilson was raised in the Greek Orthodox faith. In addition to Bulgarian, her father could speak "Russian, Turkish, Polish, Greek, a little bit of Italian, a little bit of French" according to Wilson's husband Tom Hanks, who said he modeled his portrayal of the character Viktor Navorski in the film The Terminal on his father-in-law.

== Career ==
=== Film, television, theater ===
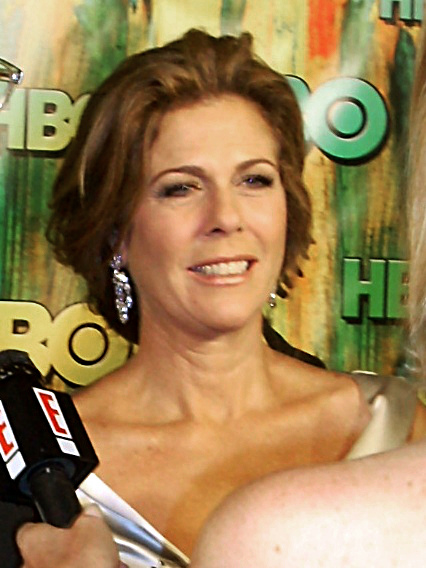
Wilson at the HBO Post–60th Primetime Emmy Awards Party in 2008

Wilson's career began with a guest appearance on The Brady Bunch in the 1972 episode "Greg's Triangle", where she played Pat Conway, one of the candidates running against Marcia Brady for head cheerleader. She also twice appeared on M*A*S*H in 1982 as Nurse Lacey as well as the sitcoms Three's Company and Bosom Buddies starring her future husband Tom Hanks, and as Hester Rose Crane, the deceased mother of Frasier Crane on Frasier.

In the 1980s, Wilson attended the London Academy of Music and Dramatic Art in England.

She has appeared in numerous films, including Volunteers, Barbarians at the Gate, The Bonfire of the Vanities, Mixed Nuts, Sleepless in Seattle, Now and Then, That Thing You Do!, Jingle All the Way, Runaway Bride, Invisible Child, The Story of Us, Raise Your Voice, It's Complicated, and Larry Crowne.

On television, she played Susan Borman, wife of astronaut Frank Borman, in the HBO miniseries From the Earth to the Moon. She guest starred in many series, including Curb Your Enthusiasm, Law & Order: Special Victims Unit, and Body of Proof, and had recurring roles on The Good Wife and Girls.

She was instrumental in helping actress-playwright Nia Vardalos get the movie deal for My Big Fat Greek Wedding, which became the highest-grossing independent film of all time and for which she served as a producer. Wilson produced two stage productions of the play as they were developing the film. A sequel, My Big Fat Greek Wedding 2, which Wilson co-produced and in which she had a supporting role, was released in 2016.

Wilson's Greek heritage was honored in 2016 when the Greek Postal Service ELTA commemorated her with a stamp along with four others: filmmaker Costa-Gavras, engineer and entrepreneur Peter Diamandis, journalist George Stephanopoulos, and billionaire businessman John Catsimatidis. In 2008, Wilson produced the film Mamma Mia!, and eight years later its sequel, Mamma Mia! Here We Go Again.

In 2006, Wilson made her Broadway debut when she performed the role of Roxie Hart in a revival of Chicago. In 2015, she starred in Larry David's Fish in the Dark on Broadway, from which she took a month-long hiatus to undergo a double mastectomy and reconstructive surgery after being diagnosed with breast cancer. Off-Broadway, Wilson performed in Donald Margulies' Pulitzer Prize-winning play, Dinner with Friends, at the Geffen Playhouse in Los Angeles in 2000, directed by Tony Award-winner Dan Sullivan. She originated the role of "Mama" in the world premier of Lisa Loomer's play, Distracted, at the Mark Taper Forum, also in Los Angeles, in 2007. Wilson played various roles in Nora and Delia Ephron's play Love, Loss, and What I Wore in 2009. She reprised the roles in the Los Angeles production at the Geffen in 2010.

In March 2020, while filming Elvis in Australia, Hanks announced through his Instagram profile that the couple had contracted COVID-19 and were experiencing minor symptoms. They were admitted to the Gold Coast University Hospital before being returned to quarantine. On March 27, Wilson and her husband returned home to Los Angeles after they recovered from the virus. The couple donated their blood antibodies for virus research.

Wilson produced the film A Man Called Otto, initially released in December 2022. Wilson became interested in producing the film after watching A Man Called Ove, the Swedish film upon which A Man Called Otto is based. The film was sold to Sony Pictures in February 2022 for $60 million, at that time the largest deal to date at the virtual European Film Market. In December, Wilson launched her production company Artistic Films, with A Man Called Otto as the company's first project.

=== Music ===
Wilson's debut solo album AM/FM was released on May 8, 2012, on Decca Records. The album featured classics from the 1960s and 70s, including a cover of "Wichita Lineman" that she performed with the song's writer-composer Jimmy Webb. She also performed a duet of "All I Have To Do Is Dream" with former Soundgarden and Audioslave musician Chris Cornell. Additional harmonies on the album are performed by Faith Hill, Sheryl Crow, Vince Gill, and Patti Scialfa (who also produced the track "Come See About Me" with Ron Aniello).

At the National Christmas Tree Lighting Ceremony in Washington, DC, on December 4, 2014, she performed for President Barack Obama and First Lady Michelle Obama, and served as co-host of the event.

In 2014, Wilson wrote the song "Bad Things" with Matt Nathanson, for the Scott Eastwood film Dawn Patrol, in which she also starred. In 2016, Wilson released her self-titled album. She co-wrote each song on Rita Wilson with Kara DioGuardi, Dan Wilson, Jason Reeves, Darrell Brown, Sugarland's Kristian Bush, Richard Marx, Lauren Christy, Mikal Blue, Nathan Chapman, Jason Wade, Stephanie Chapman, Ron Aniello, Jillian Jacqueline, Jessi Alexander, JR Randall, Yugomir Lonich, Blair Daly, and Kelly Archer. The song "Strong Tonight" was also performed by Connie Britton in an episode of the ABC television show Nashville. The New York Times said: "Ms. Wilson has a catch in her voice that conveys yearning and potential heartbreak behind a façade of cheer." To support the release of Rita Wilson, she opened on a tour with Chicago; she has said she is a lifelong fan of the band.

A year later, Wilson presented the event "Liner Notes: Songwriters, Stories and Music with Rita Wilson and Friends". The show, which took place at the Audrey Skirball Kenis Theater at the Geffen Playhouse in Los Angeles, included performances from Wilson along with Patty Smyth, Desmond Child, Jeff Barry, and Kristian Bush, among others.

With her third album, Bigger Picture, Wilson drew directly from her personal life for its theme. The album, released September 28, 2018, reunited her with AM/FM's producer Fred Mollin. Wilson co-wrote many of the tracks with Kristian Bush and Darrell Brown, as well as new partners The Warren Brothers, Lindy Robbins and Alex Reid, and the album also included covers of Cat Stevens' "The Wind" and Burt Bacharach/Hal David's "What the World Needs Now Is Love".

Also in 2018, Wilson performed "Heart Unknown", co-written with Josh Alexander, DioGuardi, and Mozella, for the indie film, Simple Wedding. In addition, she performed "Sometimes Love", co-written with David Hodges, for the independent film Emmett, in which she also stars.

On March 29, 2019, Wilson released her fourth album, Halfway to Home, which included "Throw Me a Party", a song inspired by her survival from breast cancer. Other songs were created during a writing workshop that partnered her with Mozella, Mitch Allan, DioGuardi, Liz Rose and Kristian Bush. Halfway to Home was co-produced by Nathan Chapman. "Halfway to Home finds Wilson pulling from musical traditions that revere deep storytelling (Southern California rock, classic Nashville country), which was a hallmark for her growing up," explained Rolling Stone.

Over the course of her music career, Wilson has performed her songs on Ellen, The Tonight Show Starring Jimmy Fallon, The Late Late Show with James Corden, Jimmy Kimmel Live!, and Today.

In March 2020, after she and husband Tom Hanks contracted the coronavirus while filming in Australia and in self-quarantine and going "stir crazy", she filmed an Instagram video showing her rapping the Naughty by Nature song, "Hip Hop Hooray". The video went viral and reached Naughty by Nature's Vin Rock. After she had fully recovered from virus, the two teamed up for a "Hip Hop Hooray" remix to benefit the MusiCares COVID-19 Relief Fund. In July 2020, Wilson appeared on Jimmie Allen's Bettie James EP, collaborating on the song "When This Is Over" with Tauren Wells and The Oak Ridge Boys. In October 2020, Wilson was featured on the single "Pink" alongside Dolly Parton, Monica, Jordin Sparks and Sara Evans. The single was released in aid of Breast Cancer Research. In 2021 she contributed to the Blues Traveler rendition of "Crazy" on their album "Traveler’s Blues".

On August 24, 2022, Wilson announced her duets album Now & Forever, a collection of 1970s covers with male vocalists. Co-produced by Wilson and Matt Rollings, the album features Willie Nelson, Keith Urban, and Elvis Costello among other guests. The album, which was preceded by three singles (including "Songbird" which she performed with Josh Groban at Radio City Music Hall in April) was released on September 27. To promote the album Wilson performed on Good Morning America with Smokey Robinson and Later... with Jools Holland with Jackson Browne, and celebrated the release with a two week residency at Cafe Carlyle. The album was nominated for Self-Released Record of the Year at the 2023 Libera Awards. In December 2023, Barack Obama featured Wilson's song "Crazy Love" with Keith Urban on his list of favorite songs of the year.

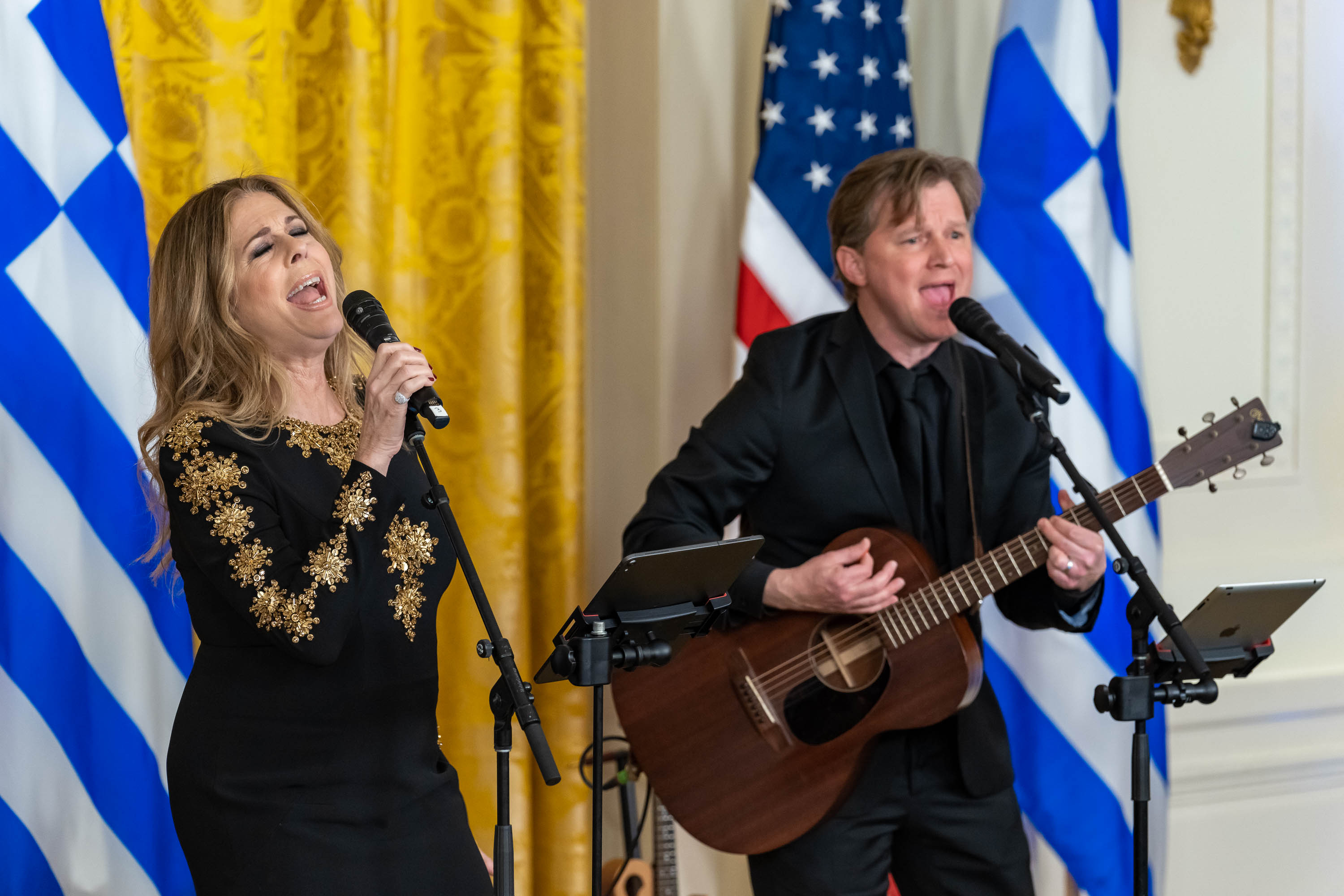
Wilson performing at The White House in March 2023

In 2022, Wilson collaborated with Sebastián Yatra on the single "Til You're Home" from the soundtrack to A Man Called Otto.

On March 29, 2023, Wilson attended the White House's Greek Independence Day celebration, alongside other prominent Greek-Americans. Wilson led the event's cultural program, performing four songs.

Wilson released her album, Sound of a Woman, in 2026.

Wilson releases her music under her own imprint Sing It Loud, which she launched in 2011. Singer-songwriter Madison Beer also releases music under the imprint in a joint venture with Epic Records.

=== Journalism ===
Wilson has been a contributing editor to Harper's Bazaar magazine, writing over twenty-one articles. She also started, and was Editor-at-Large of, a section of The Huffington Post called Huff/Post50, which explored issues and topics relative to people over fifty years old. She has also written for O, The Oprah Magazine.

== Personal life ==
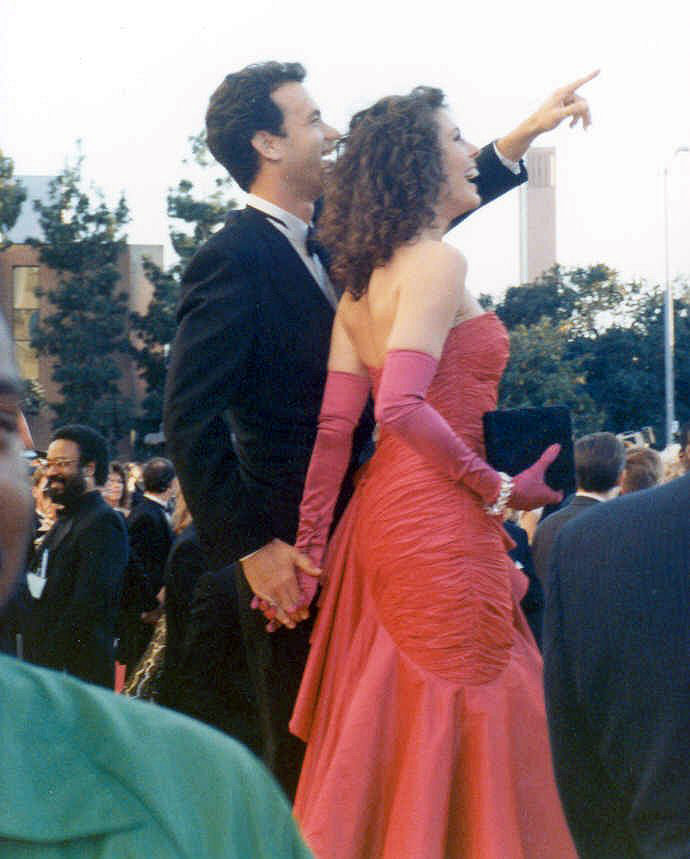
Wilson and Hanks at the 61st Academy Awards in 1989

Wilson married actor Tom Hanks in 1988. Hanks already had two children from a previous marriage, Colin and Elizabeth Hanks. She has two sons with Hanks, Chet and Truman. Wilson has three grandchildren.

She is a member of the Greek Orthodox Church.

== Activism ==
In 2015, Wilson signed an open letter from the ONE Campaign. The letter was addressed to Angela Merkel and Nkosazana Dlamini-Zuma, then heads of the G7 and the African Union, respectively, urging them to focus on women in their work against poverty and inequality.

Wilson endorsed Senator John Edwards in the 2004 Democratic Party presidential primaries.

== Philanthropy ==
For over 20 years, Wilson and her husband, Tom Hanks, have been honorary co-chairs (along with Steven Spielberg and Kate Capshaw) of the Women's Cancer Research Fund (WCRF), specializing in raising money for women's cancers. In 2016, WCRF joined forces with Evelyn Lauder's Breast Cancer Research Foundation. Wilson contributed to the Moffitt Cancer Center by donating "True Hearts" jewelry made of sterling silver and 14k gold.

Wilson has credited Rosie O'Donnell as inspiration for her charitable work, particularly with cancer and children's charities. She and her husband have long supported the Shakespeare Center of Los Angeles, starting in 1989 when Wilson appeared as Celia in a production of As You Like It. Their annual Simply Shakespeare event raises funds to support programs for underprivileged youth. Musicians at the fundraiser have included Paul McCartney, Paul Simon, Jackson Browne, Faith Hill, Tim McGraw, Ben Harper, and Reba McEntire.

In 2018, Wilson and Hanks were honored with USC Shoah Foundation's Ambassadors For Humanity award in recognition of their "longstanding commitment to humanitarian causes and support of veterans". The couple also contribute to other charities including AIDS Project Los Angeles.

In 2019, Wilson, her husband, and their children, were granted Greek citizenship by honorary naturalization by President Prokopis Pavlopoulos, in recognition of their support of those affected by the 2018 Mati fire.

== Filmography ==
=== Film ===
Year	Title	Role	Notes
1977	The Day It Came to Earth	Debbie	
1980	Cheech and Chong's Next Movie	Hostage	
1985	Volunteers	Beth Wexler	
1989	Teen Witch	Dancer	
1990	Sinners	Margaret	
1990	The Bonfire of the Vanities	P.R. Woman	
1993	Sleepless in Seattle	Suzy	
1994	Mixed Nuts	Catherine O'Shaughnessy	
1995	Now and Then	Chrissy DeWitt Williams	
1996	That Thing You Do!	Marguerite	
1996	Jingle All the Way	Liz Langston	
1996	No Dogs Allowed	(unknown)	Short film
1998	Psycho	Caroline	
1999	Runaway Bride	Ellie Graham	
1999	The Story of Us	Rachel	
2001	Perfume	Roberta	aka Dress to Kill
2001	The Glass House	Grace Avery-Baker	Uncredited role
2002	Auto Focus	Anne Crane	
2004	Raise Your Voice	Frances Fletcher	
2005	The Chumscrubber	Terri Bratley	
2005	Magnificent Desolation: Walking on the Moon 3D	Beta Station Commander (voice)	Short film
2006	Beautiful Ohio	Judith Messerman	
2009	My Life in Ruins	Elinor	aka Driving Aphrodite; Also executive producer
2009	Old Dogs	Jenna	
2009	It's Complicated	Trisha	
2011	The Art of Getting By	Vivian Sargent	
2011	Larry Crowne	Wilma Q. Gammelgaard	
2012	The Carrier	Helen	Short film
2012	Jewtopia	Arlene Lipschitz	aka Finding Ms. Right
2013	The Tutor	Tina	Short film
2014	Kiss Me	Edith	
2014	Dawn Patrol	Shelia	aka Stranded
2016	My Big Fat Greek Wedding 2	Anna	Also producer
2016	Brother Nature	Cathy Turley	
2018	Gloria Bell	Vicky	
2018	A Simple Wedding	Maggie Baker	Also executive producer
2019	Boy Genius	Mary Locke	Also producer
2020	Love Is Love Is Love	Mary Kay	Segment: "Late Lunch"
2020	Borat Subsequent Moviefilm	Herself	Cameo
2022	Kimi	Natalie Chowdhury	
2023	Asteroid City	Mrs. Weatherford	
2023	Start Without Me	Mona	
2026	Marty, Life Is Short	Herself	Documentary film

=== Television ===
Credits as television actress
Year	Title	Role	Notes
1972	The Brady Bunch	Pat Conway	Episode: "Greg's Triangle"
1974	Movin' On	Penny	Episode: "The Cowhands"; uncredited role
1977	Lou Grant	Christine Farrell	Episode: "Cophouse"; uncredited role
1978	The Beach Girls	Ginny Day	Television film
1978	CHiPs	Alice	Episode: "One Two Many"; uncredited role
1978	Flying High	Debbie	Episode: "Flying High"
1979	Hawaii Five-O	Mary Ellen Klane	Episode: "The Skyline Killer"
1979	A Man Called Sloane	Kathy	Episode: "The Venus Microbe"
1980	B. J. and the Bear	Suzanne	Episode: "The Good, the Bad and the Beautiful"
1981	Bosom Buddies	Cindy	Episode: "All You Need is Love"
1982	Mr. Merlin	Beverly	Episode: "Everything's Coming Up Daisies"
1982	M*A*S*H	Nurse Lacey	2 episodes
1982	Happy Days	Roxanne	Episode: "A Woman Not Under the Influence"
1983	Happy Days	Barbara McManus	Episode: "Where the Guys Are"
1983	Three's Company	Agnes Platt	Episode: "Alias Jack Tripper"
1984	Legmen	Cathy	Episode: "A Woman's Work"
1986	Who's the Boss?	Shirley	Episode: "Losers and Other Strangers"
1986	227	Dr. Peterson	Episode: "Mary Nightingale"
1988	CBS Summer Playhouse	China Seasons	Episode: "Silent Whisper"
1988	Sonny Spoon	Jolene	Episode: "Blind Justice"
1988	Thirtysomething	Adrienne	Episode: "In Re: The Marriage of Weston"
1989	Moonlighting	Carla McCabe	Episode: "Those Lips, Those Lies"
1989–1990	Midnight Caller	Connie Zymak	3 episodes
1990	Sisters	Kate Morrison	Television film
1990	WIOU	Ellen Zaret	Episode: "One Point, No Light"
1991	Tales from the Crypt	Jess Gilchrist	Episode: "Mournin' Mess"
1992	Civil Wars	Margot Wilkenson	Episode: "Tape Fear"
1993	Barbarians at the Gate	Carolyne Roehm-Kravis	Television film
1996	If These Walls Could Talk	Leslie	Television film; segment: "1996"
1998	Mad About You	Lindsay Krbnsk	Episode: "Separate Planes"
1998	From the Earth to the Moon	Susan Borman	Miniseries; 3 episodes
1999	Invisible Child	Annie Beeman	Television film
1999–2001	Frasier	Mia Preston / Hester Crane	2 episodes
2000	Teacher's Pet	Cosmetics Saleswoman (voice)	Episode: "A Lick Is Still a Kiss"
2001	Curb Your Enthusiasm	Anne Michaelson	Episode: "The Doll"
2003	My Big Fat Greek Life	Cousin Ariana	Episode: "Ariana"
2003	The Wild Thornberrys	Kua (voice)	Episode: "Look Who's Squawking"
2011	Law & Order: Special Victims Unit	Bree Mazelon	Episode: "Delinquent"
2011–2014	The Good Wife	Viola Walsh	6 episodes
2012	Body of Proof	Ruth Stone	Episode: "Sympathy for the Devil"
2012	Who Do You Think You Are?	Herself	Episode: "Rita Wilson"
2013–2017	Girls	Evie Michaels	7 episodes
2015	Full Circle	Shelly Rezko	5 episodes
2016	Pitch	Andrea Barton	Episode: "Wear It"
2022	1883	Carolyn	Miniseries; episode: "Boring the Devil"
2025	Too Much	Lois Salmon	7 episodes
2025	Entertainment Tonight	Chrissy	1 episode
2026	The Last Thing He Told Me	Carol	Episode: "Reunion"
2026	Life, Larry and the Pursuit of Unhappiness	Mavis Lewis	Episode: "Farewell"

=== As musical performer ===
Credits as television musical performer
Date	Song	Television show
December 9, 2016	"The Christmas Song (Chestnuts Roasting On An Open Fire)"	Live @ YouTube Space LA
March 15, 2016	"Along For the Ride"	The Ellen DeGeneres Show
October 31, 2017	"You're So Cold"	Later... with Jools Holland
October 1, 2018	"Bigger Picture: Album Medley"	Billboard Live Performance
October 5, 2018	"Bigger Picture"	The Today Show
December 12, 2018	"Bigger Picture"	Pickler & Ben
December 12, 2018	"Bigger Picture"	Jimmy Kimmel Live!
April 1, 2019	"Throw Me a Party"	The Late Late Show with James Corden
April 5, 2019	"Throw Me a Party"	The Today Show
May 15, 2019	"Throw Me a Party"	Pickler & Ben
February 14, 2020	"Throw Me a Party"	TedXNashvilleWomen
April 5, 2020	"The Star-Spangled Banner"	NASCAR on Fox
April 7, 2020	"Throw Me a Party"	The Kelly Clarkson Show

=== As producer ===
Credits as producer
Year	Title	Role	Notes
2002	My Big Fat Greek Wedding	Producer	
2003	My Big Fat Greek Life	Executive producer	TV series; 3 episodes
2004	Connie and Carla	Executive producer	
2008	Mamma Mia!	Executive producer	
2009	My Life in Ruins	Executive producer	aka Driving Aphrodite
2016	My Big Fat Greek Wedding 2	Producer	
2018	Mamma Mia! Here We Go Again	Executive producer	
2018	A Simple Wedding	Executive producer	
2019	Boy Genius	Producer	
2023	A Man Called Otto	Producer	
2023	My Big Fat Greek Wedding 3	Producer	

=== As director ===
Credits as director
Year	Title	Role	Notes
2007	The Trap	Director	Short film

== Discography ==
Discography for Rita Wilson
Album title	Release date	Track listing
AM/FM	May 8, 2012	"All I Have to Do Is Dream"; "Never My Love"; "Come See About Me; "Angel of the Morning"; "Walking in the Rain"; "Wichita Lineman"; "Cherish"; "You Were on My Mind"; "Good Time Charlie's Got the Blues"; "Love Has No Pride"; "Please Come to Boston"; "Will You Love Me Tomorrow?"; "Faithless Love"; "River"; "Every Perfect Picture"
Rita Wilson	March 11, 2016	"Along for the Ride"; "Crying, Crying"; "Talking to Me"; "Forgiving Me Forgiving You"; "Say Yes"; "Strong Tonight"; "What You See Is What You Get"; "Joni"; "In the Dark"; "Stay Low"; "Every Day"; "Girls Night In"; "I'm Guilty"; "Still Gone"; "Grateful"
Bigger Picture	September 28, 2018	"Bigger Picture"; "Good Man"; "Heart He Handed Down"; "Tear by Tear"; "Not About the Music"; "The Way I Am"; "Broken Man"; "Blindsided"; "Go On Through It"; "The Wind"; "It Goes So Fast"; "Even More Mine"
Halfway to Home	March 29, 2019	"Big City Small Town Girl"; "The Spark"; "Song for Everyone"; "Halfway to Home"; "Throw Me a Party"; "Oh, No, You Didn't"; "New Girl"; "Demolition Man"; "Rule Breaker"; "Pay Me in Wine"; "Faith in You"; "Heart Race"; "Date Night"
Now & Forever: Duets	September 27, 2022	"Crazy Love" with Keith Urban; "Where Is the Love" with Smokey Robinson; "Slip Slidin' Away" with Willie Nelson; "Let It Be Me" with Jackson Browne; "Massachusetts" with Leslie Odom Jr.; "Fire" with Elvis Costello; "If" with Tim McGraw; "I'll Be There" with Jimmie Allen; "Without You" with Vince Gill; "Songbird" with Josh Groban
Sound of a Woman	September 18, 2026	"Sound of a Woman"; "Your Mother"; "Jury of One"; "Marriage"; "Michelangelo"; "Whose Body Is This?"; "Better for Her"; "Spare Keys (Coming Home to Me)"; "Diamonds"; "This Song"; "No Matter What"; "Stranger with Age"

Wilson is credited as co-writer for all tracks on Rita Wilson, Bigger Picture, and Halfway to Home.
