= Bokförlaget Forum =

Publishing company from Sweden

Bokförlaget Forum (Swedish: Forum bokförlag) is a Swedish publishing company and a member of Bonnierförlagen, a publishing house within Bonnier Books Nordic. Other publishing companies in the collective publishing house are Albert Bonniers Förlag, Bokförlaget Max Ström, Bonnier Audio, Bonnier Carlsen, Bonnier Fakta, Bonnier Pocket, Månpocket, Kartago, Reseförlaget and Wahlström & Widstrand. Forum publishes around seventy titles annually.

== History ==
=== Adam Helms and Forum ===
The early 1940s saw the entrance of Adam Helms on the Swedish book market. Originally from Haslev, Denmark, Helms was a trained bookseller with experience in working in publishing and a well-known profile in the book business. Helms moved to Sweden in 1939 to take up employment as the manager of the Danish-Norwegian department of Importbokhandeln; a position he left in 1944 to found Bokförlaget Forum on commission of Bonniers.

Forum was originally not intended to publish Swedish authors, but focus on translating foreign literature. The base of the publishing company was to be a series of classics, something no other publisher had dared to in Sweden thus far, complemented with popular non-fiction and other translated literature.

==== The Forum Library ====
The series of classics was christened Forumbiblioteket, the Forum Library. When the series was launched, one of the insufficiencies of Swedish publishing was the absence of a series of classics, not as a singular instance but rather a permanent institution. Many of the most significant titles throughout history were simply not available in Swedish. Helms ambition with the Forum Library was to make the classics available not only to the book-reading elite, but rather to educate the masses. Models for the series were the German publisher Insel-Bücherei, English Everyman's Library and American Modern Library.

The first title published by Forumbiblioteket and Bokförlaget Forum was Ernest Hemingway's Klockan klämtar för dig (original title For Whom the Bell Tolls) translated by Thorsten Jonsson, and gave Forum a massive start. The vividly discussed screen adaptation of the novel screened in Swedish cinemas at the same time as the book was released. Other titles during Forum's first year were Hjalmar Bergman's Chefen Fru Ingeborg, Alexis Carrel's Den okända människan (Man, The Unknown), E. M. Forster's En färd till Indien (A Passage to India), The Travels of Marco Polo, Strindberg’s Röda Rummet (The Red Room), Voltaire's Candide och Steinbeck’s Riddarna kring Dannys bord (Tortilla Flat). Subsequent titles in the Forum Library are, among others, Strindberg’s Röda rummet, Austen’s Stolthet och fördom (Pride and Prejudice), Swift's Gullivers resor (Gulliver’s Travels), Cervantes’ Don Quijote av la Mancha (The Ingenious Nobleman Sir Quixote of La Mancha), Goethe's Faust, Tolstoy's Krig och fred (War and Peace), etc.

Today, the Forum Library and its many titles have contributed to the obliteration of gaps in the publishing of classics in Swedish.

==== När Var Hur ====
In the 1930s, Harald Gyllstoff, a publisher from Schleswig-Holstein, persuaded the Danish publishing company Politiken to publish an illustrated annual of facts and events. The first edition was published in 1933 and was called Hvem Hvad Hvor (literally translates to When What How).

När Var Hur 1945, the Swedish version on the same idea, was published at the end of 1944 by Åhlén & Åkerlund and was an immediate commercial success. In 1948, the publishing rights of the Swedish title was passed over to Forum. När Var Hur was a long-lived annual and spawned a vast number of non-fiction titles on variety subjects.

Adam Helms wanted to create a non-fiction backlist for Forum to secure revenue and not entirely financially lean on the fiction titles published. Examples of handbooks published from this backlist are, among others, Carl A. Andersson's books on wine – Slottstappning (Castle Drafting), Vingårdsvandring (Vineyard Walking), Vin och andra drycker (Wine and Other Beverages) and Einar Wallquist's medical book Våra sjukdomar (Our Diseases).

==== Kon-Tiki ====
In 1947, Norwegian ethnographer Thor Heyerdahl made and sailed a raft of balsa wood, called Kon-Tiki, from Peru to the Polynesian Islands. The purpose of the trip was to prove that the Polynesian inhabitants originated from America rather than Asia. In the academic world, most people thought Heyerdal a fanatic and questionable scientist. In 1948, Norsk Gyldendal published Heyerdahl's story, which then was sent to Bonniers for consideration, Helms managed to persuade Kaj Bonnier to have it transferred to Forum. Expedition Kon-Tiki (The Kon-Tiki Expedition) was a best seller and an overwhelming success which gave Forum international recognition.

==== Sigma ====
In the 1950s, the mathematical cultural history title The World of Mathematics had become a best seller in the US, tempting Adam Helms to undertake a similar project. The result was the classic title Sigma - En matematikens kulturhistoria (Sigma – A Cultural History of Mathematics). All the contributions were translated from the original language instead of the English original title, university fact checkers scrutinized the contributions and the printing was done at the small quality printer Victor Pettersson. One of the premier artists in the country at the time, Lennart Rohde, was chosen and given free hands to create the layout of the titles, including a cartridge. There were even revival meetings held for book sellers, where the Sigma message was preached.

==== Doris Lessing and The Golden Notebook ====
Albert Bonniers typically received the most as well as the best manuscripts, but the books they rejected would often end up at Forum. Solveig Nellinge at Forum once received a thumbed stack of a manuscript from Bonniers, a novel by an English author of whom she had never heard. The novel was Doris Lessing's Den femte sanningen (The Golden Notebook) and was quickly published, and was followed by several more of Lessing's titles published by Forum.

=== Forum after Adam Helms ===
Adam Helms retired from Forum in April 1971. Helms wanted Solveig Nellinge as his successor but Bonnierledningen chose Kjell Petersson, an economist who had worked centrally at Bonniers since the early 1960s, as the new CEO of the publishing company. Solveig Nellinge and Adam Helms subsequently started the publishing company Bokförlaget Trevi in the fall of 1971. Doris Lessing and Edna O’Brien are two of the authors that transferred to Trevi.

Under Kjell Petersson Forum started publishing crime novels and thrillers by Swedish authors, which had previously not been done at the publishing house. Authors such as Olov Svedelid, Ulf Durling, Olle Högstrand, Sven Sörmark, among others, were instantly successful. However, the publishing house still focused on literary, translated titles, with authors such as Julian Barnes, Jayne Anne Phillips, Claudio Magris and Virginia Woolf.

=== Bokförlaget Trevi ===
The publishing house Bokförlaget Trevi was founded in 1971 by Adam Helms and Solveig Nellinge, and mainly focused on the publication of female authors such as Karen Blixen, Marie Cardinal, Margaret Drabble, Gisèle Halimi, Doris Lessing, Anaïs Nin, Edna O'Brien and Sylvia Plath. In 1980 Nellinge took full ownership of the publishing company and subsequently sold it to Bonniers in 1991. However, she stayed on as the manager until 1997, when the company was merged with Forum.

==== The Guinness Book of Records ====
At the end of the 1950s Forum started publishing Guinness Rekordbok (The Guinness Book of Records), a publication which continued for 30 years.

== Imprints within Forum ==
Over the years, Forum has acquired several publishing companies. In 2000, the publisher Bokförlaget DN became an imprint under Forum, in 2004 the popular science-focused publishing Fahrenheit was made an imprint and the same year the publishing company Bokförlaget Fitness was acquired.

Bokförlaget Minotaur was a Swedish publishing company publishing translated crime novels, with their first publication made in 1999. In 2003 it became an imprint under Forum. Minotaur authors include Mark Billingham, Stephen Booth, Reginald Hill, Denise Mina, Peter Robinson and Ian Rankin. As of 2015, the imprint has been completely absorbed into Forum's publishing.

In 2016 the imprint Yourlife Books was started; however, it was abandoned the same year. In 2017 the boutique-imprint Lovereads, publishing contemporary romance in Swedish, was started.

== Awards ==
- Therese Lindgren's Ibland mår jag inte så bra was Sweden's best-selling non-fiction title of 2016.
- Camilla Läckberg and her Fjällbacka-series has been Sweden's best selling female crime novel author for several years.
- Fatima Bremmer was awarded the August Prize in August 2017 för Ett jävla solsken, a biography on Ester Blenda Nordström.
- Anders de la Motte was awarded the Swedish Crime Writers' Academy's award in 2015 för UltiMatum.
- Niklas Natt och Dag was awarded the Swedish Crime Writers' Academy's award for best debut in 2017 for his novel 1793.
- Små citroner gula by Kajsa Ingemarsson was the best-selling book in Sweden in 2004 and was adapted into a feature film starring Rakel Wärmländer.
- Nobel Prize winning Forum authors include Elias Canetti in 1981, Toni Morrison in 1993, Gao Xingjian in 2000, Elfriede Jelinek in 2004 and Doris Lessing in 2007.
- Forum published Fredrik Backman's debut novel, the global phenomenon En man som heter Ove (A Man Called Ove), which when subsequently adapted to the screen became one of the most successful movies with the public in Swedish history. The movie was nominated for an Academy Award for Best Foreign Language Film and was successful in the US.
- Viveca Sten's Morden i Sandhamn-series (Murders in Sandhamn) has been adapted for television and is a very popular TV4-series, currently on its sixth season.
