= The Sideways Life of Denny Voss =

2025 novel by Holly Kennedy

- First edition paperback
- Author: Holly Kennedy
- Cover artist: Philip Pascuzzo
- Language: English
- Genre: Coming-of-age; mystery
- Publisher: Lake Union Publishing
- Publication date: April 8, 2025
- Publication place: United States
- Pages: 335
- ISBN: 978-1662525926

The Sideways Life of Denny Voss is a coming-of-age mystery novel by Canadian author Holly Kennedy. It was published on April 8, 2025 by Lake Union Publishing. It follows an intellectually disabled man who must fight a murder charge. An audiobook narrated by Andrew Eiden and Holly Kennedy was released concurrently with the ebook and paperback editions.

== Background ==
Kennedy wrote the first thirty pages of the novel at a writer's retreat in 2010. While she was initially unsure if she was able to write a book about an intellectually disabled man when she was not intellectually disabled herself, she convinced herself to write it after learning that Mark Haddon was able to write The Curious Incident of the Dog in the Night-Time, a novel about an autistic boy, despite not being autistic himself. In writing Denny, she wanted the novel to challenge stereotypes about intellectually disabled people draining resources while having little to contribute to society. Denny's voice was influenced by one of her relatives, who is intellectually disabled.

While Kennedy is Canadian, she chose to situate the novel in Minnesota, due to the gun violence in the United States. Denny's dog George was originally a Newfoundland dog, as Kennedy's family adopted had Newfoundland dogs for thirty years, but his breed was changed after her family adopted a deafblind St. Bernard. The novel is the first book that Kennedy has written in the first person.

== Synopsis ==
In the small rural town of Woodmont, Minnesota, Denny Voss is an intellectually disabled man who lives with his mother and his loyal St. Bernard named George. One day, he is arrested for allegedly murdering his neighbor. In the process of fighting this charge, he learns unexpected truths about himself, his family, and the world.

== Reception ==
The novel was longlisted for the 2025 Giller Prize. It was also nominated for an Edgar Award for Best Paperback Original and an Audie Award for Best Fiction Narrator.

Chris Hewitt of The Minnesota Star Tribune called Denny's narrative voice "charming" but "sometimes grat[ing]".
