= Red Clay (novel) =

2025 novel by Charles B. Fancher

- First edition hardcover
- Author: Charles B. Fancher
- Cover artist: Alenka Vdovič Linaschke
- Language: English
- Genre: Historical fiction
- Publisher: Blackstone Publishing
- Publication date: February 4, 2025
- Publication place: United States
- Pages: 336
- ISBN: 9798212408691

Red Clay is a historical fiction novel by American author Charles B. Fancher. It was published on February 4, 2025 by Blackstone Publishing. It is Fancher's debut novel. An audiobook narrated by Dion Graham was released concurrently with the ebook and hardcover editions. The novel tells the live story of a former slave who grew up during the Reconstruction era, and is based on the life of Fancher's great-grandfather.

== Background ==
Fancher was inspired to write Red Clay after his mother suggested that he write a book about his great-grandfather, who was born into slavery on a southern Alabama plantation and managed to create a good life for himself and his family after the Civil War. He visited southern Alabama for the novel and conducted interviews with local historians and people who had known his family. The book was originally planned to be non-fiction, but later became a historical fiction novel.

== Synopsis ==
In 1943, African American Eileen Epps is home from college for her grandfather Felix Parker's funeral. The following day, an elderly white woman named Adelaide "Addie" Parker meets Eileen and tells her that her family used to own Felix and his family as slaves. She tells her stories about Felix's past that he had never shared with family. As an eight-year-old in 1864, Felix was the only remaining child of Plessant and Elmira, who were enslaved on a plantation known as Road's End in the town of Red Clay, Alabama, while his older siblings were sold by plantation owner John Robert Parker. Facing financial losses, John Robert kills himself with his own pistol after having Felix swear to claim that two white men shot him. This lie saves John Robert's family from financial ruin. After the war ends and the slaves are emancipated, Addie's older brother Claude creates a system of sharecroppers and land leases, leading to most of his emancipated slaves staying with him. Felix and Addie come of age as the Reconstruction era transitions into the Jim Crow era, with Felix growing into a proud and accomplished man building a life for himself as a carpenter, and Addie being forced to reexamine the ideas she grew up with.

== Reception ==
The novel won an NAACP Image Award for Debut Author. It was nominated for an Audie Award for Fiction Narrator. It was longlisted for a Crook's Corner Book Prize, which honors the "best debut novel set in the American South."

Leah Tyler of The Atlanta Journal Constitution called the novel "as nuanced as it is engrossing". Publishers Weekly called it "immersive", but stated that it had some "purple prose". Marcie Geffner of the Washington Independent Review of Books called the novel "heartfelt", but criticized its lack of suspense about Felix's fate and its introduction of plotlines that never advance.
