= My Grandmother Asked Me to Tell You She's Sorry =

Swedish novel

- First edition (Swedish)
- Author: Fredrik Backman
- Original title: Min mormor hälsar och säger förlåt
- Translator: Henning Koch
- Language: Swedish
- Genre: Novel
- Publisher: Forum (Swedish); Washington Square Press (US)
- Publication date: 2013 Sweden; 2015 US
- Publication place: Sweden
- Media type: Print
- Pages: 400 pp (US)
- ISBN: 1501115073

My Grandmother Asked Me to Tell You She's Sorry (published in the United Kingdom as My Grandmother Sends her Regards and Apologises) is a novel written by the Swedish columnist, blogger, and writer Fredrik Backman. The book was first published in Swedish (as Min mormor hälsar och säger förlåt) in 2013. The English translation was later published in 2015. The rights for translation have been sold in more than 40 countries. In 2017, the novel was longlisted for the International Dublin Literary Award.

== Plot summary ==
The story takes place in Sweden and follows Elsa, a 7-year-old girl who knows she is different from other children her age. Elsa has a habit of correcting others' grammar, is smart for her age, and is especially close with her grandmother (Granny). When Granny dies, Elsa slowly discovers more about her grandmother's past identities, as well as the lives of people affected by her grandmother.

The UK edition was published by Sceptre, an imprint of Hodder & Stoughton, in 2015 (ISBN 9781444775839), with the title My Grandmother Sends Her Regards and Apologises.

== Film and TV adaptations ==
The northern European based Nordisk Film acquired the rights for the book for development in May 2018.

== Audiobook ==
An audio version of this book was released in 2015 by Simon & Schuster, Inc. It was read by Joan Walker.
