= Invisible Child (film) =

1999 American made-for-television drama film

- Written by: Ronald Bass; David Field
- Directed by: Joan Micklin Silver
- Starring: Rita Wilson; Victor Garber; Tushka Bergen; Mae Whitman; David Dorfman
- Country of origin: United States
- Original language: English

Production
- Producers: Gideon Amir; Jay Weston
- Running time: 93 minutes

Original release
- Network: Lifetime
- Release: March 8, 1999

Invisible Child is a 1999 American made-for-television drama film starring Rita Wilson as a mother who imagines she has three children when she has only two.

== Plot ==
Fearing his wife may be institutionalized because of her delusional disorder, her husband goes along with this charade as though it is perfectly normal. The 10-year-old daughter assists her father in facilitating the delusion. The youngest child seems to really believe that he has a 5-year-old sister named "Maggie." They hire a nanny who initially goes along with the family's unusual situation, but she becomes concerned about the effects on the real children and reports the family to child protective services.

A legal battle ensues, ending in victory for the family. It is also revealed that the real children were not harmed by pretending about "Maggie." In the middle of the movie, the husband explains that he tried to take his wife to the best psychologists in town, who told him that she was mentally ill and would have to go to an institution. He didn't want that to happen, so he went along with the ruse for five years.

One night, his wife hears him carrying on a conversation with "Maggie," and the next morning she states that "Maggie" has died. Apparently, hearing the aforementioned conversation helps the wife out of her mental illness and allows her to finally let go of her imaginary child.
