= My Friends (Backman novel) =

2025 novel by Fredrik Backman

- Swedish first edition cover art
- Author: Fredrik Backman
- Original title: Mina vänner
- Translator: Neil Smith
- Cover artist: Amy Devlin
- Language: Swedish
- Genre: Literary fiction
- Publisher: Norstedts (Swedish), Atria Books (English)
- Publication date: 28 August 2025
- Publication place: Sweden
- English publication date: 6 May 2025
- ISBN: 9781982112820

My Friends (Swedish: Mina vänner) is a 2025 novel by Swedish author Fredrik Backman. Despite having been originally written in Swedish, it was first published in English by Atria Books on 6 May 2025, before being published in Swedish by Norstedts on 28 August 2025. The audiobook was narrated by Marin Ireland.

== Development ==
My Friends started with a first draft with "about 82 parallel storylines and somewhere around 9,000 characters". It was written during a period in which Backman struggled with his confidence as a writer and strongly considered retiring from publishing. He then rewrote the novel to focus solely on a storyline about four childhood friends after showing the draft to two other writers, who both responded positively to it. In an interview with USA Today, Backman stated that it may be the last book he will ever publish, as he struggles with the stress of the publishing industry.

== Synopsis ==
The novel is told in two alternating timelines. One timeline takes place during a summer spent among four childhood friends. The other timeline takes place twenty-five years later, after a painting of three of the friends sitting on a pier has become the subject of one of the most famous paintings in the world named The One of the Sea. It centres on Louisa, a teenage girl who has been through several violent foster homes since her mother abandoned her as a child and is struggling with the fatal overdose of a close friend. After sneaking into an auction house to see the painting, she encounters the artist, a thirty-nine-year-old terminally ill man named C. Jat. As his final act before his death, he asks Ted, one of the boys depicted in the painting, to track her down and give her the artwork. This takes her on a cross-country journey to learn more about the painting and the friend group that inspired it.

== Reception ==
The novel was praised for its humour and poignancy. USA Today called the novel "unforgettably funny" and "deeply moving". Kirkus Reviews called it "humorous, poignant, and always life-affirming". Publishers Weekly praised the interactions between Louisa and Ted. Karen Bellovich called it a "tender heartwarming novel" in her review for the Chicago Review of Books.

The novel won a Goodreads Choice Award in the Readers' Favorite Fiction category. It was also the #1 pick for the Indie Next List of May 2025. It was shortlisted for a British Book Award for Fiction Book of the Year The audiobook won a Libby Book Award for Audiobook of the Year and was nominated for an Audie Award for Fiction.

The novel spent 12 weeks on the New York Times Best Seller List, reaching number one on 17 August 2025.
