= Patio home =

Form of medium-density housing

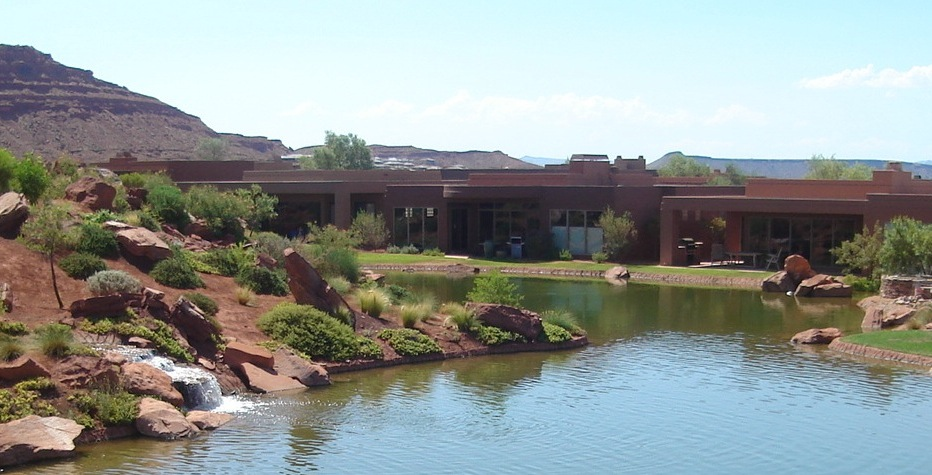
Many suburban upper-middle class patio home developments feature fully landscaped common areas which are maintained by a subdivision which charges a monthly maintenance fee.

A patio home – also known as a cluster home – is a type of American house. They are primarily built in a suburban setting, becoming common during the latter half of the 20th century.

== Description ==
Cluster homes can be a small, freestanding structure very close to the neighbor or part of a unit of several houses attached to each other – typically with shared walls between units – and with exterior maintenance and landscaping provided through an association fee. Not all of these elements are present in all buildings called patio homes, as the term is used somewhat generically by the real estate industry.

The building may actually be a condo in which the owner holds a fractional interest in the land throughout the development, or it may be titled as a townhome in which each homeowner holds direct title to the land on which their unit is built. Targeted buyers are primarily those who do not want to be bothered by external maintenance typically associated with home ownership, sometimes because they only live in the patio home for part of the year.

There is not usually a legal definition of a patio home, and some houses called patio homes may alternatively be marketed as townhouses, garden homes, twin homes, or carriage homes. Most taxing jurisdictions do not have a separate classification for patio homes.

The term was first seen in print in the mid-1970s. In a more generic sense it may refer to a home with a prominent patio, such as some traditional Mediterranean-style homes.

== See also ==
- Duplex (building)
