= Man, the Unknown =

1935 book by Alexis Carrel

- Original French language cover and title, L'Homme, cet inconnu (1935)
- Author: Alexis Carrel
- Language: French
- Publication date: 1935
- Publication place: France
- Text: Man, the Unknown at Internet Archive

Man, the Unknown (L'Homme, cet inconnu) is a best-selling 1935 book by Alexis Carrel in which he endeavours to outline a comprehensive account what is known and, more importantly, unknown of the human body and human life. The book elucidates problems of the modern world and possible routes to a better life for human beings. It is specifically known for its advocacy of eugenics and euthanasia.

== Synopsis ==
For Carrel, the fundamental problem was that:

[M]en cannot follow modern civilization along its present course, because they are degenerating. They have been fascinated by the beauty of the sciences of inert matter. They have not understood that their body and consciousness are subjected to natural laws, more obscure than, but as inexorable as, the laws of the surreal world. Neither have they understood that they cannot transgress these laws without being punished. They must, therefore, learn the necessary relations of the cosmic universe, of their fellow men, and of their inner selves, and also those of their tissues and their mind. Indeed, man stands above all things. Should he degenerate, the beauty of civilization, and even the grandeur of the physical universe, would vanish. ... Humanity's attention must turn from the machines of the world of inanimate matter to the body and the soul of man, to the organic and mental processes which have created the machines and the universe of Newton and Einstein.

=== Aristocracy ===
Sociologist Roger Caillois quoted and paraphrased L'Homme, cet inconnu in The Edge of Surrealism: " '(p)resent-day proletarians owe their status to inherited intellectual and physical defects' (sancta simplicitas). And he [Carrel] suggests that this state of affairs should be accentuated through appropriate measures, so as to correlate social and biological inequalities more precisely. Society would then be directed by a hereditary aristocracy composed of descendants from the Crusaders, the heroes of the Revolution, the great criminals, the financial and industrial magnates" (p. 360).

Carrel proposed that:

We must single out the children who are endowed with high potentialities, and develop them as completely as possible. And in this manner give to the nation a non-hereditary aristocracy. Such children may be found in all classes of society, although distinguished men appear more frequently in distinguished families than in others. The descendants of the founders of American civilization may still possess the ancestral qualities. These qualities are generally hidden under the cloak of degeneration. But this degeneration is often superficial. It comes chiefly from education, idleness, lack of responsibility and moral discipline. The sons of very rich men, like those of criminals, should be removed while still infants from their natural surroundings. Thus separated from their family, they could manifest their hereditary strength. In the aristocratic families of Europe there are also individuals of great vitality. The issue of the Crusaders is by no means extinct. The laws of genetics indicate the probability that the legendary audacity and love of adventure can appear again in the lineage of the feudal lords. It is possible also that the offspring of the great criminals who had imagination, courage, and judgment, of the heroes of the French or Russian Revolutions, of the high-handed business men who live among us, might be excellent building stones for an enterprising minority. As we know, criminality is not hereditary if not united with feeble-mindedness or other mental or cerebral defects. High potentialities are rarely encountered in the sons of honest, intelligent, hard-working men who have had ill luck in their careers, who have failed in business or have muddled along all their lives in inferior positions. Or among peasants living on the same spot for centuries. However, from such people sometimes spring artists, poets, adventurers, saints. A brilliantly gifted and well-known New York family came from peasants who cultivated their farm in the south of France from the time of Charlemagne to that of Napoleon.

=== Eugenics ===
Carrel endorsed voluntary positive eugenics. He wrote:

We have mentioned that natural selection has not played its part for a long while. That many inferior individuals have been conserved through the efforts of hygiene and medicine. But we cannot prevent the reproduction of the weak when they are neither insane nor criminal. Or destroy sickly or defective children as we do the weaklings in a litter of puppies. The only way to obviate the disastrous predominance of the weak is to develop the strong. Our efforts to render normal the unfit are evidently useless. We should, then, turn our attention toward promoting the optimum growth of the fit. By making the strong still stronger, we could effectively help the weak; For the herd always profits by the ideas and inventions of the elite. Instead of leveling organic and mental inequalities, we should amplify them and construct greater men.

He continued:

The progress of the strong depends on the conditions of their development and the possibility left to parents of transmitting to their offspring the qualities which they have acquired in the course of their existence. Modern society must, therefore, allow to all a certain stability of life, a home, a garden, some friends. Children must be reared in contact with things which are the expression of the mind of their parents. It is imperative to stop the transformation of the farmer, the artisan, the artist, the professor, and the man of science into manual or intellectual proletarians, possessing nothing but their hands or their brains. The development of this proletariat will be the everlasting shame of industrial civilization. It has contributed to the disappearance of the family as a social unit, and to the weakening of intelligence and moral sense. It is destroying the remains of culture. All forms of the proletariat must be suppressed. Each individual should have the security and the stability required for the foundation of a family. Marriage must cease being only a temporary union. The union of man and woman, like that of the higher anthropoids, ought to last at least until the young have no further need of protection. The laws relating to education, and especially to that of girls, to marriage, and divorce should, above all, take into account the interest of children. Women should receive a higher education, not in order to become doctors, lawyers, or professors, but to rear their offspring to be valuable human beings. The free practice of eugenics could lead not only to the development of stronger individuals, but also of strains endowed with more endurance, intelligence, and courage. These strains should constitute an aristocracy, from which great men would probably appear. Modern society must promote, by all possible means, the formation of better human stock. No financial or moral rewards should be too great for those who, through the wisdom of their marriage, would engender geniuses. The complexity of our civilization is immense. No one can master all its mechanisms. However, these mechanisms have to be mastered. There is need today of men of larger mental and moral size, capable of accomplishing such a task. The establishment of a hereditary biological aristocracy through voluntary eugenics would be an important step toward the solution of our present problems.

Carrel advocated euthanasia for the criminally insane, and the death penalty for dangerous criminals. He specifically advocated the use of gasses.

[T]he conditioning of petty criminals with the whip, or some more scientific procedure, followed by a short stay in hospital, would probably suffice to insure order. Those who have murdered, robbed while armed with automatic pistol or machine gun, kidnapped children, despoiled the poor of their savings, misled the public in important matters, should be humanely and economically disposed of in small euthanasic institutions supplied with proper gasses. A similar treatment could be advantageously applied to the insane, guilty of criminal acts.

His endorsement of this idea began in the mid-1930s, prior to the actual implementation of Nazi euthanasia policies in 1939 (Aktion T4). In the 1936 German introduction of his book, at the publisher's request, he added the following praise of the Nazi regime which did not appear in the editions in other languages:

[T]he German government has taken energetic measures against the propagation of the defective, the mentally diseased, and the criminal. The ideal solution would be the suppression of each of these individuals as soon as he has proven himself to be dangerous.
