= Holly Kennedy =

Canadian writer

Holly Kennedy is a Canadian writer from Alberta, whose novel The Sideways Life of Denny Voss was longlisted for the 2025 Giller Prize.

Originally from Athabasca, she published her debut novel, The Tin Box, in 2005.

== Life ==
Kennedy lives in the foothills of the Rocky Mountains with her family and her Newfoundland dog named Wallace. She grew up poor in a small town, with four siblings and a mother who cleaned houses for a living. She was inspired to become an author when she read Millions of Cats at the age of eight. She has ADHD, depression, and severe anxiety.

== Works ==
- The Tin Box - 2005
- The Penny Tree - 2007
- The Silver Compass - 2008
- The Sideways Life of Denny Voss - 2025
