= A Man Called Otto =

2022 film by Marc Forster

- Theatrical release poster
- Directed by: Marc Forster
- Screenplay by: David Magee
- Based on: A Man Called Ove (novel) by Fredrik Backman; A Man Called Ove (film) by Hannes Holm
- Produced by: Fredrik Wikström Nicastro; Rita Wilson; Tom Hanks; Gary Goetzman
- Starring: Tom Hanks; Mariana Treviño; Rachel Keller; Manuel Garcia-Rulfo; Truman Hanks; Mike Birbiglia
- Cinematography: Matthias Königswieser
- Edited by: Matt Chessé
- Music by: Thomas Newman
- Production companies: Columbia Pictures; Stage 6 Films; SF Studios; Artistic Films; Playtone; 2DUX²; STXfilms; Big Indie Pictures
- Distributed by: Sony Pictures Releasing
- Release date: December 29, 2022
- Running time: 126 minutes
- Country: United States
- Language: English
- Budget: $50 million
- Box office: $113 million

A Man Called Otto is a 2022 American comedy-drama film directed by Marc Forster from a screenplay by David Magee. It is a remake of the 2015 Swedish film A Man Called Ove, which was based on the 2012 novel of the same name by Fredrik Backman. The film stars Tom Hanks and his son Truman in the title role, with Mariana Treviño, Rachel Keller, and Manuel Garcia-Rulfo in supporting roles. The plot follows a bitter old man who reluctantly gets involved in the lives of his neighbors.

A Man Called Otto began a limited theatrical release on December 29, 2022, before a wide release in the United States on January 13, 2023, by Sony Pictures Releasing. The film received positive reviews from critics and grossed $113 million worldwide against a $50 million production budget.

== Plot ==
Otto Anderson is a 63-year-old widower, living in a patio home in suburban Pittsburgh. Six months after losing his wife Sonya, a schoolteacher, Otto has become a curmudgeonly, fastidious recluse. Pushed into retirement from his job at a steel plant, he cancels his utilities and plans to kill himself to join her.

Preparing to hang himself, Otto is interrupted by the arrival of new neighbors: pregnant Marisol, husband Tommy, and daughters Abby and Luna, who try to befriend him. When he resumes his attempted suicide, the noose pulls the hook from the ceiling. He visits Sonya's grave, reminiscing: as a young man, he failed his army medical with hypertrophic cardiomyopathy. Waiting to return home he saw Sonya drop a book on the platform, following her onto a train going in the opposite direction to his, he returns the book and Sonya takes an immediate liking to him. She gives him the money to buy a ticket where he gets a 1964 silver quarter in change, which she prompts him to keep.

Otto helps his neighbor Anita with her radiators, despite holding a grudge against her husband Reuben, a non-responsive stroke survivor. He attempts suicide again by means of carbon monoxide poisoning in his garage, thinking back to his and Sonya's courtship as he begins to lose consciousness, but he is interrupted by Marisol seeking help after Tommy breaks his leg falling from a ladder. Otto reluctantly drives Marisol and the children to the hospital, where he assaults a clown for taking his special quarter during a magic trick.

While waiting on a railway platform, planning another suicide attempt, Otto remembers his graduation from engineering school, when he asked Sonya to marry him. As the train approaches, an older man faints onto the tracks and Otto saves him, and is pulled to safety by another passenger at the last second. This rescue is filmed by onlookers who are intent on their phone cameras, rather than assisting with the rescue. When a stray cat takes a liking to him, Otto reluctantly adopts it. He confronts a teenager named Malcolm for delivering unwanted advertising circulars, and the boy recognizes Otto as his former teacher's husband, describing how Sonya supported him as a trans student.

Annoyed by Marisol's failure to learn to drive, Otto gives her lessons. They visit Sonya's favorite bakery, where Otto explains that Anita and Sonya were best friends, but he and Reuben grew apart over rivalries and trivialities such as brand loyalties to different car manufacturers, Otto being for Chevrolet and Reuben Ford. The final straw came when Reuben bought a Toyota, culminating in Reuben's "coup", replacing Otto as chair of the neighborhood association. Otto babysits Abby and Luna while Marisol and Tommy spend a night out together, and befriends Malcolm, helping to fix his bicycle.

Otto dodges social media journalist Sharie Kenzie after a video of the incident at the train station goes viral. Unable to come to terms with Sonya's death, Otto lashes out at Marisol and also at an agent for Dye & Merika, a real estate company trying to buy up the neighborhood. He prepares to commit suicide by shotgun, remembering the bus crash on a romantic trip to Niagara Falls that caused a pregnant Sonya to lose their baby and become a paraplegic. This fourth suicide attempt is interrupted by Malcolm, who has been kicked out by his father; Otto lets him stay the night.

Otto learns that Dye & Merika are conspiring with the estranged son of Reuben and Anita, using Anita's secret Parkinson's diagnosis to buy their house and put Reuben in their nursing home. He resolves to fight them and asks for Marisol's help, finally opening up about Sonya's lost child and subsequent disability, his frustration at the inaccessibility of the Dye & Merika housing development, and how he was voted out as association chair after a heated confrontation. When Dye & Merika staff arrive to take Reuben, the neighbors band together to stop them, while Kenzie live-streams the incident, exposing their illegal access to Anita and Otto's medical records.

Otto collapses and is taken to hospital, identifying Marisol as his next of kin. She is amused to learn that "his heart is too big", then goes into labor and gives birth to a son, Marco. Otto gives Marisol and Tommy the cradle he built when Sonya was pregnant, gives his car to Malcolm, and grows closer to his neighbors.

Three years later, following a snowfall, Tommy notices Otto has not shoveled his walkway as he normally would. He and Marisol enter his house and find that Otto has died of heart failure. They also find a letter to Marisol bequeathing her his home, savings, new truck, and cat. Following his wishes for a funeral, the neighbors gather to remember Otto.

== Cast ==
- Tom Hanks as Otto Anderson
  - Truman Hanks as young Otto
- Mariana Treviño as Marisol
- Rachel Keller as Sonya
- Manuel Garcia-Rulfo as Tommy
- Mike Birbiglia as the Dye & Merika real estate agent
- Cameron Britton as Jimmy
- Mack Bayda as Malcolm
- Juanita Jennings as Anita
- Peter Lawson Jones as Reuben
- Kelly Lamor Wilson as Shari Kenzie

In addition, Christiana Montoya and Alessandra Perez appear as Luna and Abby, respectively. John Higgins appears as a store clerk.

== Production ==
In September 2017, it was announced that Tom Hanks would star in an English-language adaptation of the 2015 Swedish film, A Man Called Ove, and would also produce alongside Playtone partner Gary Goetzman, wife Rita Wilson, and Fredrik Wikström Nicastro of SF Studios. Marc Forster was confirmed as the film's director in January 2022, with David Magee writing the screenplay. On February 10, 2022, it was announced that Sony Pictures pre-bought the rights to the film for around US$60 million at the European Film Market.

=== Filming ===
Filming began in Pittsburgh, Pennsylvania, in February 2022 and wrapped up three months later in May.

=== Soundtrack ===
Thomas Newman composed the film's score. The soundtrack album was released by Decca Records on December 30, 2022. The album also features the single "Til You're Home" by Rita Wilson and Sebastián Yatra, which was released on December 2, 2022, and was shortlisted for the Academy Award for Best Original Song. Chet Hanks's song "White Boy Summer" appears in a brief scene.

== Release ==
The film began limited theatrical release in New York City and Los Angeles on December 29, 2022, before a wide release in the United States on January 13, 2023, by Sony Pictures Releasing. It was originally set for a wide release on December 25, 2022, then moved up to December 14, 2022, before moving to its current date.

=== Home media ===
The film was released through video on demand on February 28, 2023. It was released on Blu-ray and DVD on March 14, 2023.

== Reception ==
=== Box office ===
A Man Called Otto grossed $64.3 million in the United States and Canada, and $48.8 million in other territories, for a worldwide total of $113.1 million, against a budget of $50 million.

A Man Called Otto grossed $60,000 at four Los Angeles and New York theaters on its opening three-day weekend. It expanded to 637 theaters the following weekend, making $4.2 million and finishing in fourth. In its third weekend the film made $12.7 million after expanding to 3,802 theaters, surpassing its $8 million projections and remaining in fourth. It then made $8.8 million in its fourth weekend, finishing fifth.

=== Critical response ===
On the review aggregator website Rotten Tomatoes, 70% of 210 critics' reviews are positive, with an average rating of 6.2/10. The website's consensus reads: "Check all cynicism at the door and allow A Man Called Otto to tug at your heartstrings with its tried-and-true tune — it just might sing." Metacritic, which uses a weighted average, assigned the film a score of 51 out of 100, based on 36 critics, indicating "mixed or average" reviews. Audiences polled by CinemaScore gave the film an average grade of "A" on an A+ to F scale.
