= David Magee =

American screenwriter and actor (born 1962)

- Born: David Stuart Magee, Jr. 1962 (age 63–64); Flint, Michigan, U.S.
- Education: Michigan State University (BFA), University of Illinois (MFA)
- Occupations: Screenwriter, producer, actor
- Spouse: Pamela Magee
- Children: 3
- Writing career
- Notable works: Finding Neverland; Life of Pi; Mary Poppins Returns
- Notable awards: Academy Award Nominee (adapted screenplay); BAFTA Nominee (adapted screenplay); Humanitas Prize winner
- Website: www.brassmantle.com

David Magee (born 1962) is an American screenwriter who was nominated for a 2004 Academy Award and a Golden Globe for Finding Neverland. Along with Simon Beaufoy, he wrote the screenplay for Miss Pettigrew Lives for a Day starring Frances McDormand and Amy Adams, which was released in 2008.

His 2012 screen adaptation of the novel Life of Pi by Yann Martel earned him a Satellite Award for Best Adapted Screenplay and a nomination for the Academy Award for Best Adapted Screenplay.

He wrote the screenplay for the Disney musical Mary Poppins Returns, directed by Rob Marshall, and starring Emily Blunt and Lin-Manuel Miranda, which was released in 2018. He received the Humanitas Prize in the Best Family Film category for his screenplay.

Magee is writing an untitled musical about Hans Christian Andersen with Stephen Schwartz.

In March 2019, it was announced that Paramount Pictures would develop an animated film version of The Tiger's Apprentice by Laurence Yep from Magee's script adaptation of the book.

In May 2020, it was also announced that Paul Feig would direct an adaptation of The School for Good and Evil based on a script by Magee. The film was released on Netflix in 2022.

In 2021, Magee was tapped to adapt the controversial romance novel Lady Chatterley's Lover, with Emma Corrin set to star, Laure de Clermont-Tonnerre directing, helmed by 3000 Pictures and distributed by Netflix. The film premiered at the 2022 Telluride Film Festival.

In January 2022, it was announced that Marc Forster would direct Tom Hanks in an American adaptation of Swedish novel A Man Called Ove (retitled A Man Called Otto) with a script written by Magee. The film was acquired by Sony Pictures and released January 2023.

Magee wrote the screenplay for the Little Mermaid that was released in 2023. Due to high costs, the film lost almost 5 million dollars for Disney.

== Filmography ==
- Finding Neverland (2004)
- Miss Pettigrew Lives for a Day (2008) - with Simon Beaufoy
- Life of Pi (2012)
- Mary Poppins Returns (2018)
- The School for Good and Evil (2022) - with Paul Feig
- A Man Called Otto (2022)
- Lady Chatterley's Lover (2022)
- The Little Mermaid (2023)
- The Tiger's Apprentice (2024)
- Anxious People (TBA)
