= Tuva Novotny =

Swedish actress (born 1979)

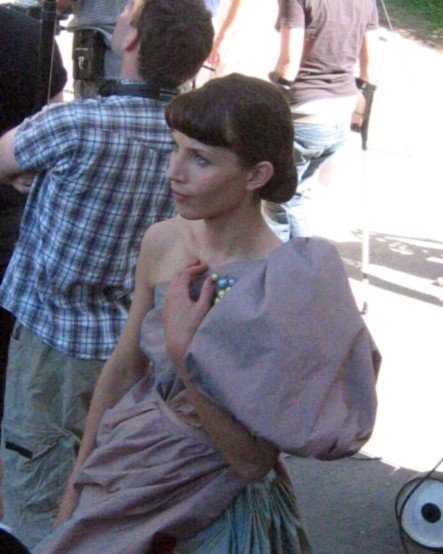
- Novotny in 2008
- Born: Tuva Matilda Moa Karolina Hedström; 21 December 1979 (age 46); Stockholm, Sweden
- Occupation: Actress
- Years active: 1996–present
- Children: 3

Tuva Matilda Moa Karolina Novotny (née Hedström; born 21 December 1979), also known as Tuva Novotny-Hedström, is a Swedish actress and director.

== Early life and education ==
Tuva Matilda Moa Karolina Hedström was born on 21 December 1979 in Stockholm, the daughter of actress and sculptor Barbro Hedström, and Czech film director and academic David Novotny. She grew up near Arvika in Värmland County, Sweden, where she trained in classical ballet and participated in local youth bands.

After moving to Stockholm, she took part in various activities at Vår teater, a children's theatre, and attended St Erik's High School, where she studied theatre.

She moved to the Czech Republic to study at a drama school there, but this was interrupted.

== Career ==
=== Acting ===
At the age of 16, Novotny had a leading role in the TV series Skilda världar, which ran from 1996 to 2000. She took on more complex roles in films such as Tic Tac (1997) and The Invisible (2002), and played a psychotic woman in the 2001 short film Anja.

In 2003, she was praised for her role as Kim in the play Limbo at Stockholm City Theatre.

She appeared in the American film Eat Pray Love in 2010, and in the years following played Puck Ekstedt in several film adaptations of Maria Lang's crime novels.

Novotny played one of the leading roles, Cass Sheppard, in the 2018 sci-fi thriller Annihilation.

=== Filmmaking ===
Novotny directed several episodes of the first season of Norwegian TV series Dag in 2010, after being invited to do so by friends. Her feature film directorial film debut was the Norwegian drama Blind Spot (Norwegian: Blindsone), which she also wrote. Blind Spot had its world premiere in August 2018 in Haugesund, Norway, and was screened at the Toronto International Film Festival and San Sebastian.

She wrote the screenplay for and directed the feature films Britt-Marie Was Here (2019) and Diorama (2022). Diorama is a Swedish/Norwegian/Danish co-production, and stars Claes Bang, David Dencik, and Sverrir Guðnason.

== Recognition and awards ==
Novotny's films have been screened at various film festivals, including San Sebastián, the Netherlands Film Festival in Utrecht; Copenhagen's CPH PIX in Copenhagen; and Cannes Film Festival.

Novotny was nominated for the Guldbagge Award for Best Actress in a Leading Role in 2003 and 2006, and for the Guldbagge Award for Best Actress in a Supporting Role in 2006.

In 2018, Novotny won the New Talent Grand Prix award at CPH PIX for her directorial debut Blind Spot. Lead actress Pia Tjelta won the Silver Shell for Best Actress at San Sebastian for her performance in the film.

== Personal life ==
In 2003, Novotny moved to Copenhagen, Denmark, where she still lives as of 2024.

Novotny has two daughters with her former partner of over 10 years, Norwegian adventurer Nicolai Bjerrum Lersbryggen, one of them was born in 2007. In 2012, she was in a relationship with Swedish actor Ola Rapace. In 2022, she had a son with Swedish actor Alexander Skarsgård.

== Acting credits ==
=== Film ===
Year	Title	Role	Notes	Ref.
1997	Tic Tac			
2000	Sleepwalker			
2000	Naken			
2000	Jalla! Jalla!			
2001	Anja		Short film	
2002	The Invisible			
2003	Midsommer			
2003	Slim Susie			
2003	Kommer du med mig då			
2004	Stratosphere Girl			
2004	Day and Night			
2005	Bang Bang Orangutang	Linda		
2006	Små mirakel och stora			
2008	The Candidate			
2009	Original			
2009	Possession			
2009	Bröllopsfotografen			
2010	Dear Alice			
2010	Eat Pray Love			
2010	Truth About Men			
2011	ID A			
2012	Fuck Up			
2015	A War			
2016	The King's Choice			
2017	Borg vs McEnroe			
2018	Annihilation			
2018	Intrigo: Death of an Author			
2019	Exit Plan			
2021	The Middle Man			
2021	Zero Contact			
2023	Avgrunden			
2025	To New Beginnings	Nomi		

=== Television ===
Year	Title	Role	Notes	Ref.
1996–1999	Skilda världar			
2000	Herr von Hancken			
2003	Norrmalmstorg		Television film	
2005	Young Andersen			
2006	Snapphanar		Miniseries	
2008	Der Kommissar und das Meer			
2010	Dag			
2016	Nobel			
2021	Bonus Family			
2022	The Kingdom			
2024	All and Eva			

=== Theater ===
Year	Title	Role	Theater	Notes	Ref.
2000	Rocky		Stockholm City Theatre	Backstage	
2003	Limbo	Kim	Stockholm City Theatre	Klara stage	

== Music ==
- 2003 – "Newfound Lover", from the soundtrack album Smala Sussie
