= Marc Forster =

German-Swiss film director

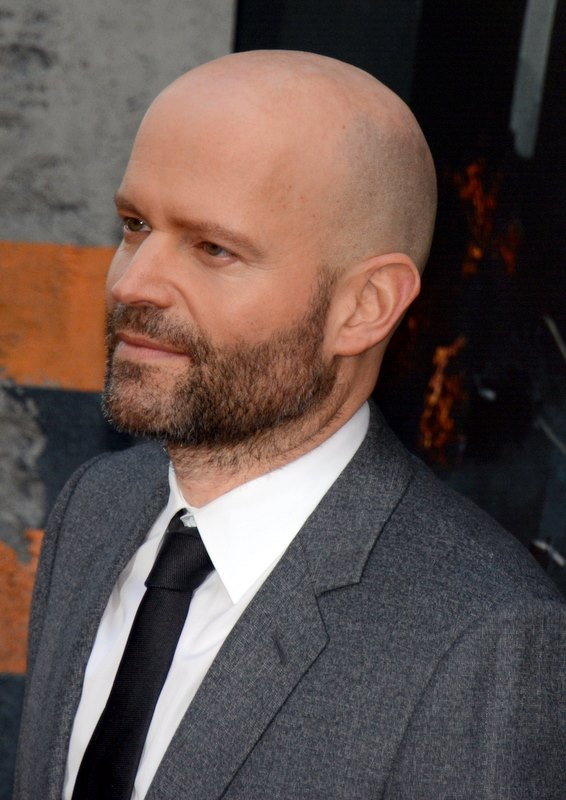
- Forster in 2013
- Born: 30 November 1969 (age 56); Illertissen, Bavaria, West Germany
- Occupation: Filmmaker
- Years active: 1995–present

Marc Forster (born 30 November 1969) is a German-Swiss filmmaker. He is best known for directing the feature films Monster's Ball, Finding Neverland, Stranger than Fiction, Quantum of Solace, World War Z, and Christopher Robin, and has additionally directed numerous television commercials. He is a BAFTA, Golden Globe, and Independent Spirit Award nominee.

== Life and career ==
Forster was born on 30 November 1969 in Au (today Illertissen), in the Neu-Ulm district of Bavaria, West Germany. His parents, a German doctor and a Swiss architect, moved to Switzerland when Forster was nine years old. He spent his adolescence in Davos, a winter resort in eastern Switzerland, and at the international boarding school Institut Montana Zugerberg in central Switzerland.

In 1990, when he was 20 years old, Forster moved to New York City in the United States. For the next three years, he attended New York University's film school, making several documentary films. In 1995, he moved to Hollywood and shot an experimental low-budget film for $10,000 called Loungers, which won the Audience Award at the Slamdance Film Festival. Forster's first feature-length motion picture was the psychological drama Everything Put Together (2000), which was nominated for the Grand Jury Prize at the Sundance Film Festival.

His breakthrough film was Monster's Ball (2001), in which he directed Halle Berry in her Oscar-winning performance as the wife of a man on death row. The film also starred Billy Bob Thornton, Heath Ledger, Peter Boyle, and Sean Combs. His next film, Finding Neverland (2004), was based on the life of author J.M. Barrie. The film was nominated for five Golden Globe Awards and seven Academy Awards, including the Best Picture. Forster received BAFTA, Directors Guild of America, and Golden Globe nominations for his direction.

Forster's next film, the thriller Stay (2005), starred Ewan McGregor and Naomi Watts. The film only grossed $8 million (USD) in the United States on an estimated budget of $50 million. Stranger than Fiction (2006), a surreal romantic comedy, was a critical success. The film grossed $54 million worldwide and earned Will Ferrell a nomination for a Golden Globe Award for Best Actor – Motion Picture Musical or Comedy.

Forster then directed an adaptation of best-seller Khaled Hosseini's The Kite Runner, scripted by frequent collaborator David Benioff and starring British newcomer Khalid Abdalla. The film follows an Afghani-American man who returns to his war-ravaged country to save the son of his former best friend. The Kite Runner was released on 14 December 2007, and grossed $73 million worldwide. It also earned a nomination for a Golden Globe Award for Best Foreign Language Film and a BAFTA bid for "Film Not In the English Language".

Additionally, Forster directed the 22nd James Bond film, Quantum of Solace, which began shooting on 2 January 2008, shortly after his 38th birthday, making him the youngest director in the series' history (beating the previous record set by Guy Hamilton, who was 41 when he directed Goldfinger five years before Forster's birth). Quantum of Solace was released in the United Kingdom on 31 October 2008. Despite mixed reviews, it became one of the highest grossing Bond films in the franchise's history, with a worldwide box office of more than $586 million.

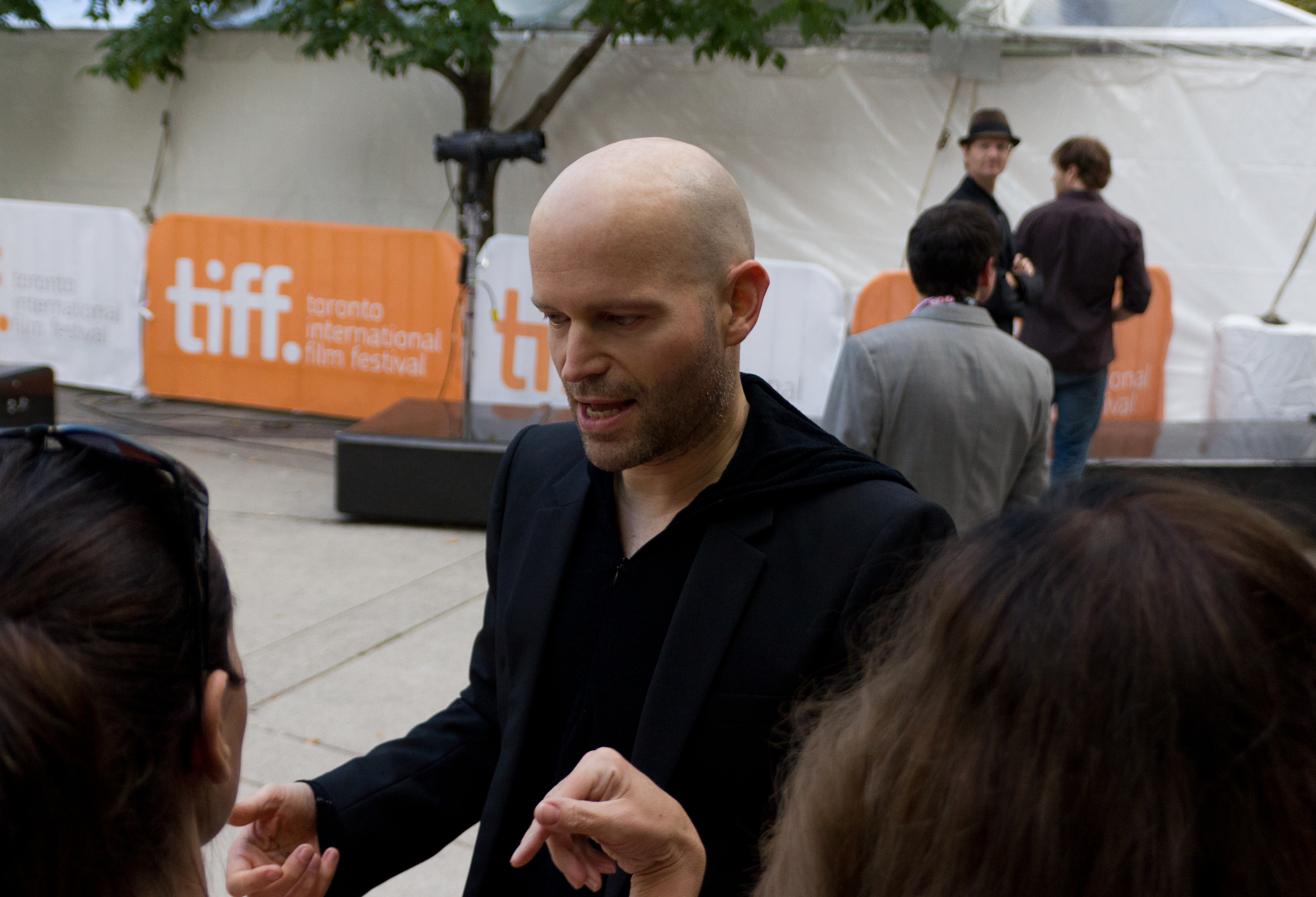
Forster in 2011

Forster directed the film adaptation of the novel World War Z, starring Brad Pitt, which Paramount Pictures announced at the 2010 San Diego Comic-Con. The film opened 21 June 2013 to more than $66 million and has grossed more than $540 million worldwide. Until 2025, it was the highest-grossing film of Brad Pitt’s career, before being surpassed by F1: The Movie, and remains the most successful zombie film of all time.

Forster directed his screenplay of All I See Is You (2016), a visually driven drama following a blind woman (Blake Lively) and her husband (Jason Clarke) who, upon the restoration of her sight, begin to discover previously unseen and disturbing details about themselves and their marriage.

In November 2016, Walt Disney Pictures announced that Forster would direct the live-action film adaptation of Winnie the Pooh, which was titled Christopher Robin. The film had its world premiere on 30 July 2018, and was theatrically released on 3 August 2018. Forster along with Will Smith bought German rights group Telepool in June 2018.

In October 2020, Mattel announced that Forster will be directing and producing a live-action animated film based on the Thomas & Friends franchise.

In January 2022, it was announced that Forster would reunite with Finding Neverland screenwriter David Magee and direct A Man Called Otto, an English-language remake of the Swedish film A Man Called Ove starring Tom Hanks. Filming began in February 2022 in Pittsburgh, while Sony Pictures acquired the worldwide distribution rights for $60 million at the European Film Market, the highest-ever figure paid at the market for a film, for theatrical release in December 2022. In July, Forster was announced the director of an adaptation of the Neil Gaiman fantasy novel The Graveyard Book, for Walt Disney Pictures.

== Filmography ==
=== Film ===
Year	Title	Director	Producer	Writer	Notes
1995	Loungers	Yes	No	Yes	Co-directed with Sebastian Roché
2000	Everything Put Together	Yes	No	Yes	
2002	Monster's Ball	Yes	No	No	
2004	Finding Neverland	Yes	No	No	Cameo as "Costume Room Worker"
2005	Stay	Yes	No	No	
2005	Sueño	No	Yes	No	
2006	Stranger than Fiction	Yes	No	No	
2007	The Kite Runner	Yes	No	No	
2008	Quantum of Solace	Yes	No	No	
2011	Machine Gun Preacher	Yes	Yes	No	
2012	Disconnect	No	Executive	No	
2013	World War Z	Yes	Executive	No	
2016	All I See Is You	Yes	Yes	Yes	
2018	Christopher Robin	Yes	No	No	
2018	Come Sunday	No	Executive	No	
2019	My Dog Stupid	No	Executive	No	
2022	A Man Called Otto	Yes	Executive	No	
2024	White Bird	Yes	No	No	
TBA	Anxious People	Yes	No	No	Post-production

=== Short film ===
Year	Title	Director	Producer	Writer
2009	LX Forty	Yes	Yes	Yes
2017	The Receipt: Lost & Found	Yes	No	No

=== Television ===
Years	Title	Director	Executive producer	Notes
2014–2017	Hand of God	Yes	Yes	Director (2 episodes); Executive producer (20 episodes)

== Awards ==
Title	Notes
Everything Put Together	Independent Spirit Award for Someone to Watch Award
Finding Neverland	Nominated- BAFTA Award for Best Direction; Nominated- Golden Globe Award for Best Director; Nominated- DGA for Outstanding Directorial Achievement in Feature Film; Nominated- Critics' Choice Movie Award for Best Director
