= A Man Called Ove (film) =

2015 Swedish film by Hannes Holm

- Theatrical release poster
- Swedish: En man som heter Ove
- Directed by: Hannes Holm
- Screenplay by: Hannes Holm
- Based on: A Man Called Ove by Fredrik Backman
- Produced by: Annica Bellander; Fredrik Wikström Nicastro
- Starring: Rolf Lassgård; Bahar Pars; Filip Berg; Ida Engvoll
- Cinematography: Göran Hallberg
- Edited by: Fredrik Morheden
- Music by: Gaute Storaas
- Production company: Tre Vänner
- Distributed by: Nordisk Film
- Release date: 25 December 2015 (Sweden)
- Running time: 116 minutes
- Country: Sweden
- Language: Swedish
- Box office: $29.4 million

A Man Called Ove (Swedish: En man som heter Ove, pronounced [ɛn ˈmanː sɔm ˈhěːtɛr ˈǔːvɛ]) is a 2015 Swedish comedy-drama film written and directed by Hannes Holm and based on the 2012 novel of the same name by Fredrik Backman. It stars Rolf Lassgård in the title role.

The film was released theatrically in Sweden on 25 December 2015. It was nominated for six awards, winning two, at the 51st Guldbagge Awards in 2016.

At the 89th Academy Awards, it was nominated for Best Foreign Language Film and Best Makeup and Hairstyling.

== Plot ==
Ove Lindahl, a 59-year-old widower, lives in a townhouse neighborhood where he once chaired the association until his friend Rune replaced him. Rune, now paralyzed from a stroke, is cared for by his wife, Anita. Since Ove’s wife Sonja, a schoolteacher, died from cancer six months ago, he has been depressed. Forced into retirement from the railroad company where he worked for 43 years, Ove's routine involves enforcing neighborhood rules and visiting Sonja's grave to talk to her.

After sorting out his affairs, Ove tries to hang himself, triggering a flashback to his childhood. His mother's death left him with his silent father, a mechanic at the railway company. His father is excited about Ove's outstanding high school results, but is hit by a train while spreading the news.

In the present, Ove's suicide attempt is interrupted by Iranian immigrant Parvaneh, her Swedish husband Patrick, and their children moving in across the street. Her persistence breaks through Ove's tough exterior, causing him to abandon the noose for carbon monoxide poisoning.

As Ove drifts into unconsciousness, memories flood back of "the Whiteshirts" trying to demolish his childhood home, which he defiantly repairs. Having been forced to take a job cleaning trains, Ove loses his home following a fire started by a neighbor. He has to sleep on a train, which leads to his meeting with Sonja. Smitten, he starts dating her, and she inspires him to pursue an engineering degree, eventually leading to his getting a better job with the railway company.

In the present, Ove's suicide attempt is interrupted again by Parvaneh needing a ride to the hospital after her husband has an accident. After reluctantly helping, Ove ends up supervising Parvaneh and Patrick's daughters in the lobby, causing a scene and being asked to leave. Later, at the railway station, he plans to end his life but instead saves a man who faints onto the tracks. His heroic act catches the attention of Lena, a local reporter, whom he evades with Parvaneh's help.

Parvaneh persuades Ove to teach her how to drive, leading to conversations about his past friendship with Rune and their falling out over car preferences. At Parvaneh's insistence, Ove reluctantly takes in a stray cat, and starts to bond with it. He also repairs a confiscated bike for a local teen named Adrian, who works at a kebab shop with Mirsad. Ove notices Mirsad's eye makeup but doesn't judge him.

Despite improving relations with his neighbors, Ove clashes with two Whiteshirts. He then tries to end his life with a shotgun but is interrupted by Adrian and Mirsad seeking refuge after Mirsad's family disowns him for coming out as gay. Reluctantly, Ove offers him shelter.

Ove learns that the Whiteshirts plan to move Rune to a nursing home, information Anita has kept from him and Sonja. Ove realizes his grudge against Rune was foolish and declares war on the Whiteshirts. However, his confrontations yield little results.

Frustrated, Ove shares with Parvaneh the story of the tragic vacation in Spain with a pregnant Sonja that ended in a bus crash. Despite Ove's efforts, Sonja lost the baby and was left paraplegic, leading Ove to build a wheelchair ramp at her school when authorities failed to do so.

In the present day, journalist Lena confronts the Whiteshirts with evidence of their financial misconduct, leading to their retreat in the face of public scrutiny. Backed by supportive neighbors, Anita prevents Rune's forced relocation, allowing Ove to reconcile with him.

Later, Ove collapses and is hospitalized with an enlarged heart. Parvaneh gives birth to a son while teasing Ove about his failed attempts at dying. Ove gifts his unborn child's crib to Parvaneh and forms a close bond with her daughters, who affectionately call him grandpa.

Months pass, and during a winter storm, Ove is found peacefully dead in his bed, with his cat on his chest. His modest funeral is attended by numerous neighbors, symbolizing the impact he had on their lives. Finally at peace, Ove awakens on a train to find Sonja sitting across from him once more.

== Cast ==
- Rolf Lassgård as Ove
- Bahar Pars as Parvaneh
- Filip Berg as Young Ove
- Ida Engvoll as Sonja
- Tobias Almborg as Patrick (Lufsen)
- Klas Wiljergård (sv) as Jimmy
- Chatarina Larsson as Anita
- Börje Lundberg as Rune
- Stefan Gödicke as Ove's Father
- Johan Widerberg as The Whiteshirt
- Anna-Lena Bergelin as Journalist Lena
- Nelly Jamarani as Sepideh (Parvaneh's daughter)
- Zozan Akgün as Nasanin (Parvaneh's daughter)
- Viktor Baagøe as 7-year-old Ove
- Simon Edenroth as Adrian
- Poyan Karimi as Mirsad
- Maja Rung as Young Anita
- Simeon Da Costa Maya as Young Rune
- Jessica Olsson as Mähät
- Fredrik Evers as Anders
- Ola Hedén as Tom
- Lasse Carlsson as Ove's Colleague
- Anna Granath as Beppo the Clown
- Emelie Strömberg as flowershop worker
- Christoffer Nordenrot as a Whiteshirt
- Simon Reithner as White Shirt Man 2
- Jerker Fahlström as Conductor
- Johanna Karlberg as DIY store clerk
- Johan Friberg as Director
- Erik Ståhlberg as the Whiteshirt (flashback)
- Magnus Sundberg as necktatooed man
- Karin de Frumerie as Ove's doctor

== Reception ==
=== Critical response ===
On review aggregator website Rotten Tomatoes, the film has an approval rating of 91% based on 121 reviews, with an average rating of 7.2/10. The website's critical consensus reads, "A Man Called Ove's winsome sincerity — and Rolf Lassgård's affectingly flinty performance in the title role — keep it from succumbing to excess sentimentality." On Metacritic, which assigns a rating to reviews, the film has a weighted average score of 70 out of 100, based on 21 critics, indicating "generally favorable reviews".

The Washington Post, Chicago Tribune and RogerEbert.com gave positive reviews. Reviewers have noted that while elements and formulas are familiar from films such as St. Vincent and Gran Torino, A Man Called Ove is well made and capable of bringing real tears to the audience's eyes.

As of 2023, the film is the third most watched Swedish theatrical film in Sweden of all time.

=== Accolades ===
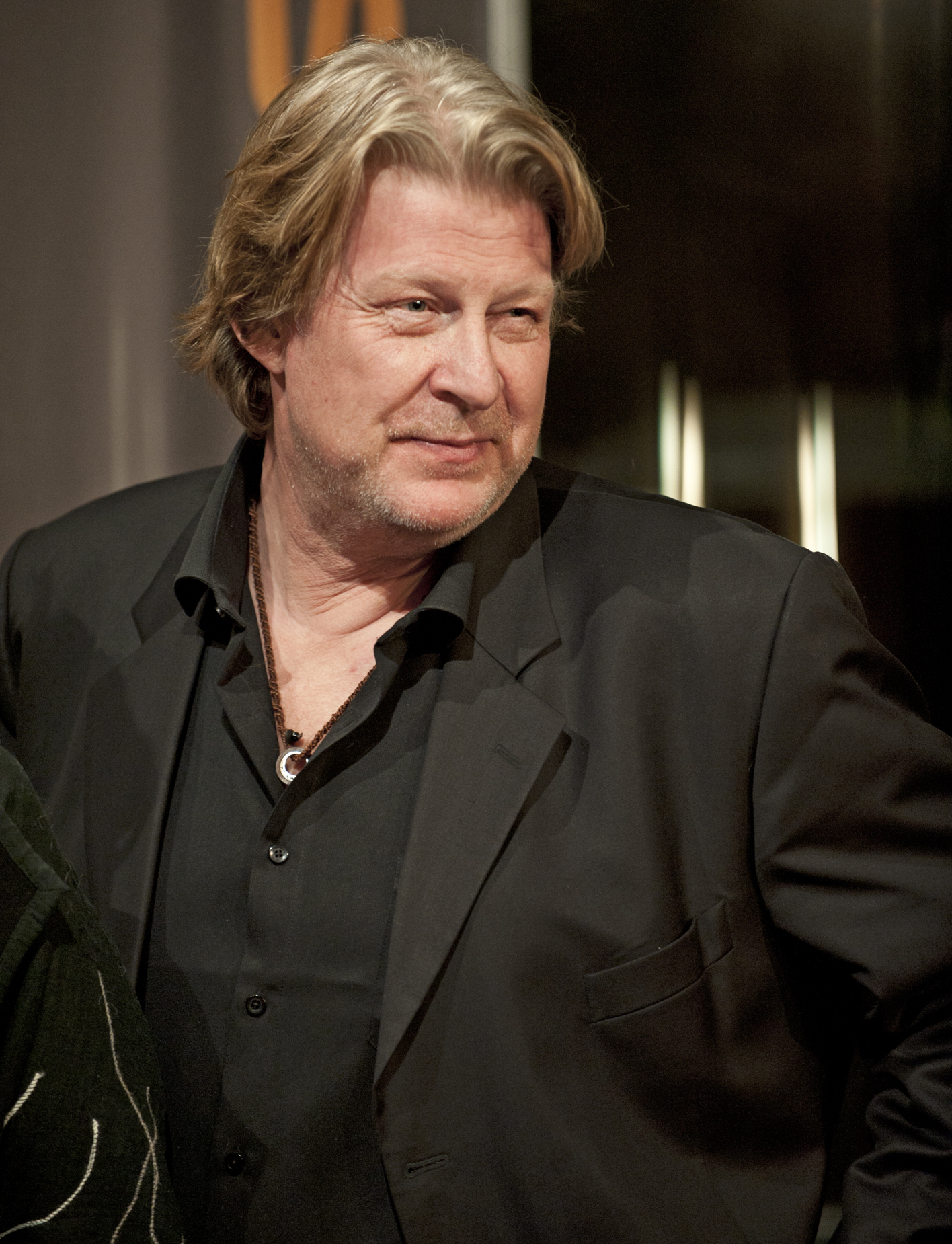
Rolf Lassgård was awarded the Best Actor award at the 51st Guldbagge Awards.

Award	Date of ceremony	Category	Recipient(s)	Result
Academy Awards	26 February 2017	Best Foreign Language Film	Sweden	Nominated
Academy Awards	26 February 2017	Best Makeup and Hairstyling	Eva von Bahr and Love Larson	Nominated
Cabourg Film Festival	11 June 2016	Essilor Audience Award	A Man Called Ove	Won
European Film Awards	10 December 2016	European Comedy	A Man Called Ove	Won
Guldbagge Awards	18 January 2016	Best Film	Annica Bellander and Fredrik Wikström Nicastro (Producers)	Nominated
Guldbagge Awards	18 January 2016	Best Actor	Rolf Lassgård	Won
Guldbagge Awards	18 January 2016	Best Supporting Actress	Bahar Pars	Nominated
Guldbagge Awards	18 January 2016	Best Cinematography	Göran Hallberg	Nominated
Guldbagge Awards	18 January 2016	Makeup and Hair	Eva von Bahr and Love Larson	Won
Guldbagge Awards	18 January 2016	Best Visual Effects	Torbjörn Olsson	Nominated
Guldbagge Awards	18 January 2016	Cinema Audience Award	A Man Called Ove	Won
Houston Film Critics Society	6 January 2017	Best Foreign Language Film	A Man Called Ove	Nominated
Satellite Awards	19 February 2017	Best Foreign Language Film	A Man Called Ove	Nominated
St. Louis Gateway Film Critics Association	18 December 2016	Best Foreign Language Film	A Man Called Ove	Nominated

== Remake ==
A remake was produced in the United States by Tom Hanks, who stars in the film. In January 2022, it was announced that the film, titled A Man Called Otto, would be directed by Marc Forster, with David Magee writing the screenplay. Filming began in February 2022 in Pittsburgh with Mariana Treviño, Rachel Keller and Manuel Garcia-Rulfo co-starring alongside Hanks. In February 2022, Sony Pictures acquired worldwide distribution rights to the film for $60 million, the highest ever paid for a film at the European Film Market, and set it for a Christmas 2022 release.

== See also ==
- List of submissions to the 89th Academy Awards for Best Foreign Language Film
- List of Swedish submissions for the Academy Award for Best Foreign Language Film
