= A Man Called Ove (novel) =

2012 novel by Fredrik Backman

- First edition (Swedish)
- Author: Fredrik Backman
- Original title: En man som heter Ove
- Translator: Henning Koch
- Language: Swedish
- Genre: Novel
- Publisher: Forum (Swedish), Atria Books (English)
- Publication date: 27 August 2012
- Publication place: Sweden
- English publication date: 15 July 2014
- Media type: Print
- Pages: 368 pp (US); 347 pp (SWE)
- ISBN: 9781476738024

A Man Called Ove (Swedish: En man som heter Ove, pronounced [ɛn ˈmanː sɔm ˈhěːtɛr ˈǔːvɛ]) is the debut novel by Swedish writer Fredrik Backman, published in Swedish by Forum in 2012. The novel was published in English in 2013 and reached the New York Times Best Seller list 18 months after its publication, where it stayed on the list for 42 weeks.

It has been adapted into two films: A Man Called Ove, which premiered in Sweden on 25 December 2015 with Rolf Lassgård in the leading role; and A Man Called Otto, released on 30 December 2022 with Tom Hanks in the leading role.

== Inspiration ==
Backman got his inspiration for this book after reading an article about a man named Ove who had a fit while buying tickets at an art museum. Backman instantly related to this man as he claims to be "not great at talking to people". He started writing blogposts under the heading, "I am a Man Called Ove", where he wrote about his pet peeves and annoyances. Eventually, he realized that his writing had potential for the creation of an interesting fictional character.

== Plot ==
Ove is fifty-nine years old, and as far as he's concerned, the world has gone soft and stupid. He drives a Saab. He believes in doing things properly screws over nails, precision over sentiment. Every morning he patrols the small housing association where he lives, checking that no one has parked wrong, that the gate to the storage shed is locked, that the world is still following the rules it's supposed to follow. He is, by every neighbor's account, insufferable.

But Ove has just lost his job of over thirty years, and six months earlier, he lost his wife, Sonja. Now he lives alone in the house they shared. Each morning he visits her grave to give her a report on his day and each night, he tries to kill himself, so he can go be with her. Every attempt is interrupted by something absurd, that almost always involves his new neighbors.

A moving truck backs into his mailbox, and out spirals Parvaneh: pregnant, Iranian, loud, endlessly persistent, married to a well-meaning disaster named Patrick who manages to break his leg falling off a ladder trying to unstick a window. Parvaneh takes one look at grumpy, hostile Ove and decides, against all his protests, that he is going to be useful to her family. She recruits him to drive her to the hospital. She sends her daughters to his door. She simply does not leave him alone, no matter how rude he is to her and Ove, despite himself, cannot bring himself to actually refuse her.

As this is happening in the present, the book keeps folding backward into Ove's past. His father was a quiet railway worker who taught him that a man is measured by what he builds and repairs, not what he says and then died suddenly in an accident when Ove was sixteen, leaving him alone in the world at an age when he should have still been a boy. Ove met Sonja on a train, by accident vibrant, warm, endlessly patient with his silences, the only person who ever made him want to talk. He fell for her completely. They married, and for a while life was simple and good, until a bus crash paralyzed Sonja and killed the child she was carrying. It was the second time catastrophe had taken something irreplaceable from him without warning and this time, instead of breaking, Ove rebuilt his entire life around her: adapting their home, fighting bureaucracies for her right to keep teaching from a wheelchair, never once treating her like something broken. Sonja kept pulling warmth out of him for the rest of her life, until cancer took her too which is where the present of the story begins, Ove alone for the first time since he was a teenager.

Piece by piece, the reader understands: Ove isn't hard because he lacks feeling. He is hard because he has felt everything, all the way to the bottom, more than once, and rules and routines were the only scaffolding that kept him upright afterward.

Running underneath all of this is Ove's lifelong war with what he calls "the men in white shirts" — the faceless representatives of municipal bureaucracy who keep showing up at the worst possible moments. They appeared when Sonja needed accommodations, and now, with Ove's old friend Rune's worsening dementia, the council tries to force him into a care home against his family's wishes. In Ove's experience, the system flattens people into inconvenient line-items, and he has always been the one willing to stand in a hallway for hours, refusing to move until someone with a rulebook backs down.

Back in the present, his fortress keeps cracking open. He takes in a half-dead stray cat he insists he doesn't want. He ends up sheltering a young man kicked out by his father for being gay, quietly, without ever making a speech about it. He helps Rune fight the council despite an old betrayal between them that still stings. A journalist trying to write a puff piece about him ends up becoming something like family too. One by one, the people Ove keeps trying to push away simply refuse to leave.

By the end, Ove hasn't become a different man, exactly. He's still gruff. He still believes in doing things properly. But the house that was empty is now full of noise a family that isn't his by blood but has become his by sheer stubborn persistence, mostly Parvaneh's. He never stops missing Sonja, still visits her grave, still talks to her but the suicide attempts quietly stop, not because he's cured, but because his days have filled back up with people who need him.

When Ove dies years later from a heart condition he had hidden, he is accompanied by the community of people he had helped. His funeral is well-attended by the neighbors and friends he supported, demonstrating both the grief of his loss and the lasting impact of his relationships.

== Characters ==
- Ove — A grumpy, 59-year-old widower who has recently been forced to retire
- Sonja — Ove's deceased wife
- Parvaneh — Ove's neighbor, a pregnant woman of Iranian descent, and a mother of two
- Patrick — Parvaneh's husband
- Rune — Ove's former friend who has become a nemesis and neighbor, he now has Alzheimer's
- Anita — Rune's wife
- Adrian — The neighborhood mailman
- Jimmy — The overweight neighbor

== Reception ==
Kirkus Reviews gave a positive review of the novel, describing how, "the back story chapters have a simple, fablelike quality, while the current-day chapters are episodic and, at times, hysterically funny. In both instances, the narration can veer toward the preachy or overly pat, but wry descriptions, excellent pacing and the juxtaposition of Ove's attitude with his deeds add plenty of punch to balance out any pathos." Publishers Weekly called the novel "a fuzzy crowd-pleaser that serves up laughs to accompany a thoughtful reflection on loss and love. Though Ove's antics occasionally feel repetitive, the author writes with winning charm."

== Adaptations ==
=== Film ===
The novel was adapted into A Man Called Ove, a Swedish film released on 25 December 2015, written and directed by Hannes Holm and starring Rolf Lassgård as Ove. The film was nominated for six awards, winning two, at the 51st Guldbagge Awards in 2016. It was nominated for the Best Foreign Language Film and Best Makeup and Hairstyling categories at the 89th Academy Awards.

An English-language film adaptation called A Man Called Otto was also released, with Tom Hanks starring and producing.

=== Theatre ===
In January 2015, a stage version of the book, starring Johan Rheborg in the leading role as Ove, premiered in Stockholm, Sweden.

In June 2016 Rheborg was one of three people responsible for the dramatisation A Man Called Ove for Oslo Nye Teater (Oslo New Theatre), in a stage production performed in collaboration with the Norwegian Touring Theatre and Thorsson Productions and directed by Bjarni Haukur Thorsson. Sven Nordin played Ove, for which he was nominated for the 2017 Hedda Award for best leading actor.

=== Audiobook ===
In July 2014, Dreamscape Media released an audiobook version of this book, read in English by the American actor George Newbern. In November 2019, Simon & Schuster released an audiobook version read in English by American actor J.K. Simmons.
