= Fredrik Backman =

Swedish columnist, blogger, and writer

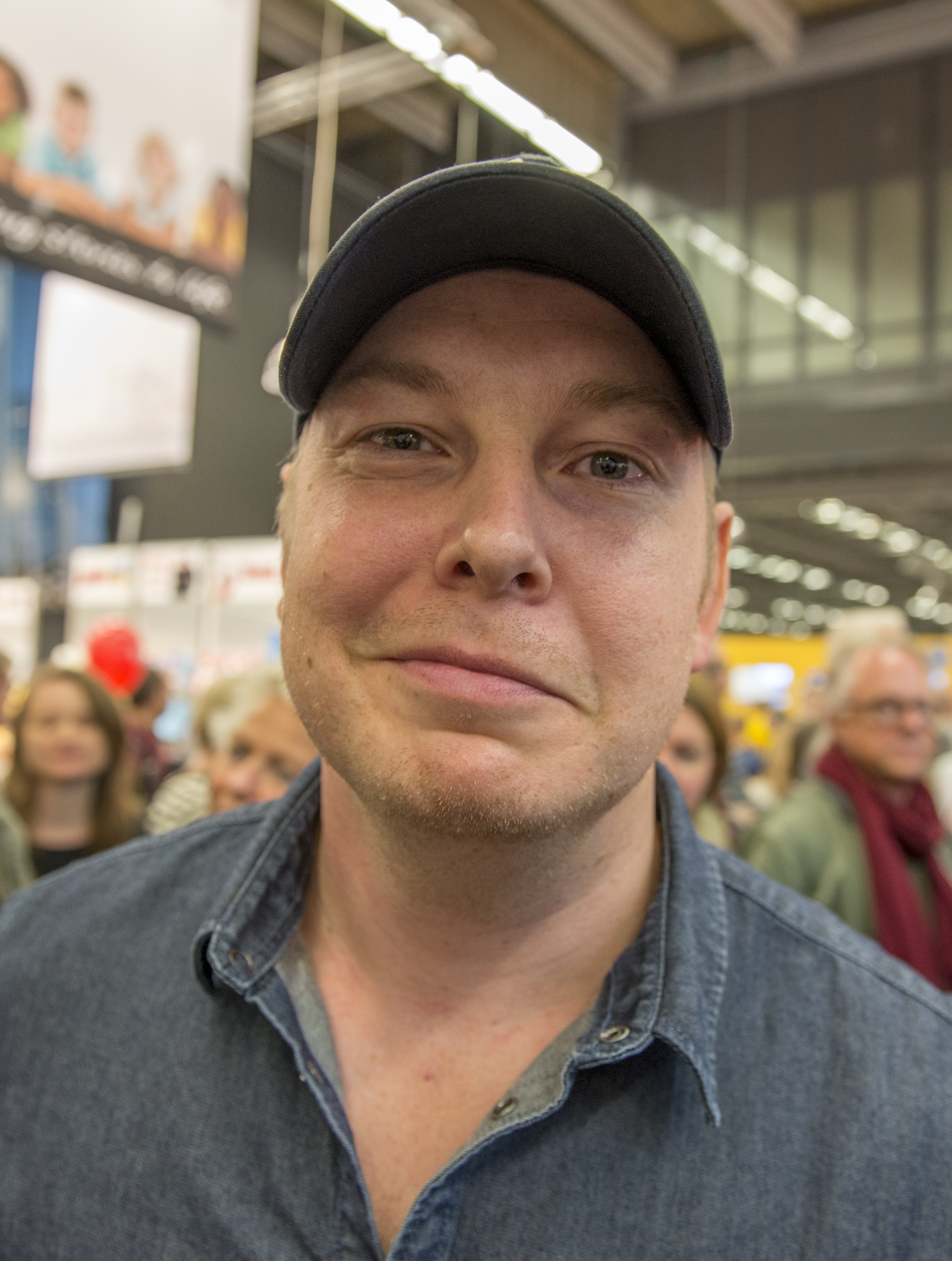
- Backman at Bokmässan 2013
- Born: 2 June 1981 (age 45); Brännkyrka in Söderort, Sweden
- Occupations: Columnist, blogger, and novelist
- Spouse: Neda Shafti Backman
- Writing career
- Period: 2012–present
- Genres: Fiction; Realistic Fiction; Satire; Humor
- Notable works: A Man Called Ove; My Grandmother Asked Me to Tell You She's Sorry; Britt-Marie Was Here; Beartown
- Website: fredrikbackman.com

Fredrik Backman (born 2 June 1981) is a Swedish author, blogger, and columnist. He wrote A Man Called Ove (2012), Things My Son Needs to Know about the World (2012), My Grandmother Asked Me to Tell You She's Sorry (2013), Britt-Marie Was Here (2014), Beartown (2017), Us Against You (2018), Anxious People (2020), The Winners (2022), and My Friends (2025). The books were number one bestsellers in Sweden and have been published in more than twenty-five languages.

== Biography ==
Backman grew up in Helsingborg, Scania, Sweden. He has been writing for the Swedish newspaper Helsingborgs Dagblad and for the Swedish men's magazine, Moore Magazine. Backman debuted as a novelist in 2012 with A Man Called Ove. The novel was adapted as a film which premiered on 25 December 2015, and again in 2023. The rights to his book Beartown were bought by Swedish production company, Filmlance. It was adapted for television in 2020. Many of his books have been translated into English. After his debut novel, A Man Called Ove, was translated into English, it spent over a year on The New York Times Best Seller list. Following the success of his first book, Atria/Simon & Schuster bought the rights to his other novels and had them translated into English.

== Personal life ==
Fredrik Backman married Neda Shafti Backman in 2009. They have two children. His second book, Things My Son Needs to Know about the World (2012), was based on his own experiences with parenting. He labeled it a "dysfunctional parenting guide" and made a deal that his publisher had to publish the book in order to publish A Man Called Ove.

== Published works ==
=== Novels ===
- En man som heter Ove (2012; English translation A Man Called Ove, 2013)
- Min mormor hälsar och säger förlåt (2013; English translation My Grandmother Asked Me to Tell You She's Sorry, 2015)
- Britt-Marie var här (2014; English translation Britt-Marie Was Here, 2016)
- Björnstad (2016; English translation Beartown, UK title The Scandal, 2017)
- Vi mot er (2017; English translation Us Against You, sequel to Beartown, 2018)
- Folk med ångest (2019; English translation Anxious People, 2020)
- Vinnarna (2021; English translation The Winners, last in the Beartown trilogy, 2022)
- Mina vänner (2025; English translation My Friends, 2025)

=== Novellas ===
- Och varje morgon blir vägen hem längre och längre (2015; English translation And Every Morning the Way Home Gets Longer and Longer, 2016)
- Ditt livs affär (2016; English translation The Deal of a Lifetime, 2017)

=== Short stories ===
- Sebastian och trollet (2017; English translation Sebastian and the Troll published on the author's website, 2018)
- Svaret är nej (2024; English translation The Answer is No published as an Amazon Original Stories ebook, 2024)

=== Essays ===
- Saker min son behöver veta om världen (2012; English translation Things My Son Needs to Know About the World, 2019)
