= 51st Guldbagge Awards =

Swedish film awards

- Date: 18 January 2016
- Site: Cirkus, Stockholm, Sweden
- Hosted by: Petra Mede

Television coverage
- Network: SVT

The 51st Guldbagge Awards ceremony, presented by the Swedish Film Institute, honoring the best Swedish films of 2015, was held on 18 January 2016.

== Winners and nominees ==
The nominees for the 51st Guldbagge Awards were announced on 8 January 2016 in Stockholm, by the Swedish Film Institute.

=== Awards ===
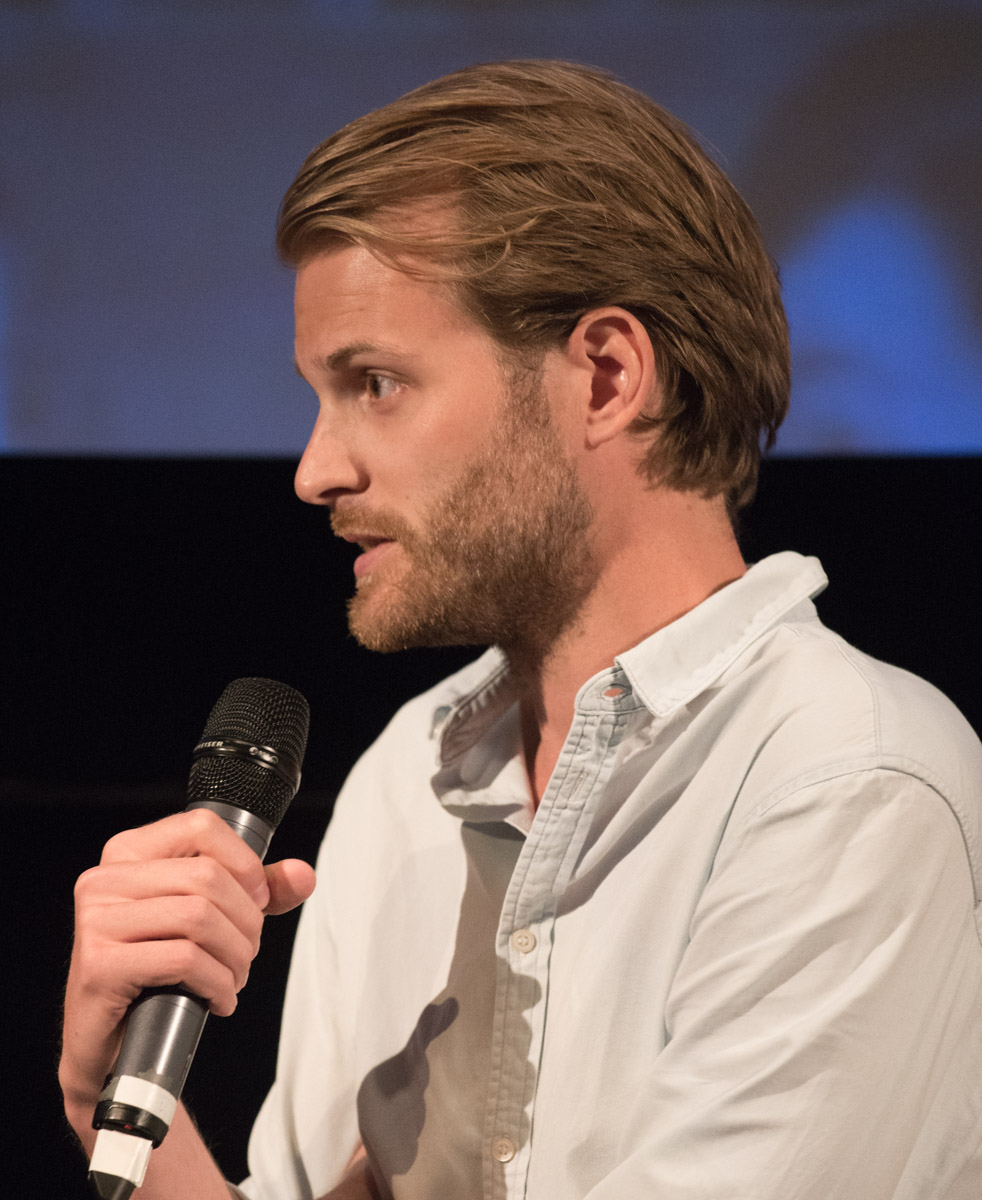
Magnus von Horn, Best Director winner

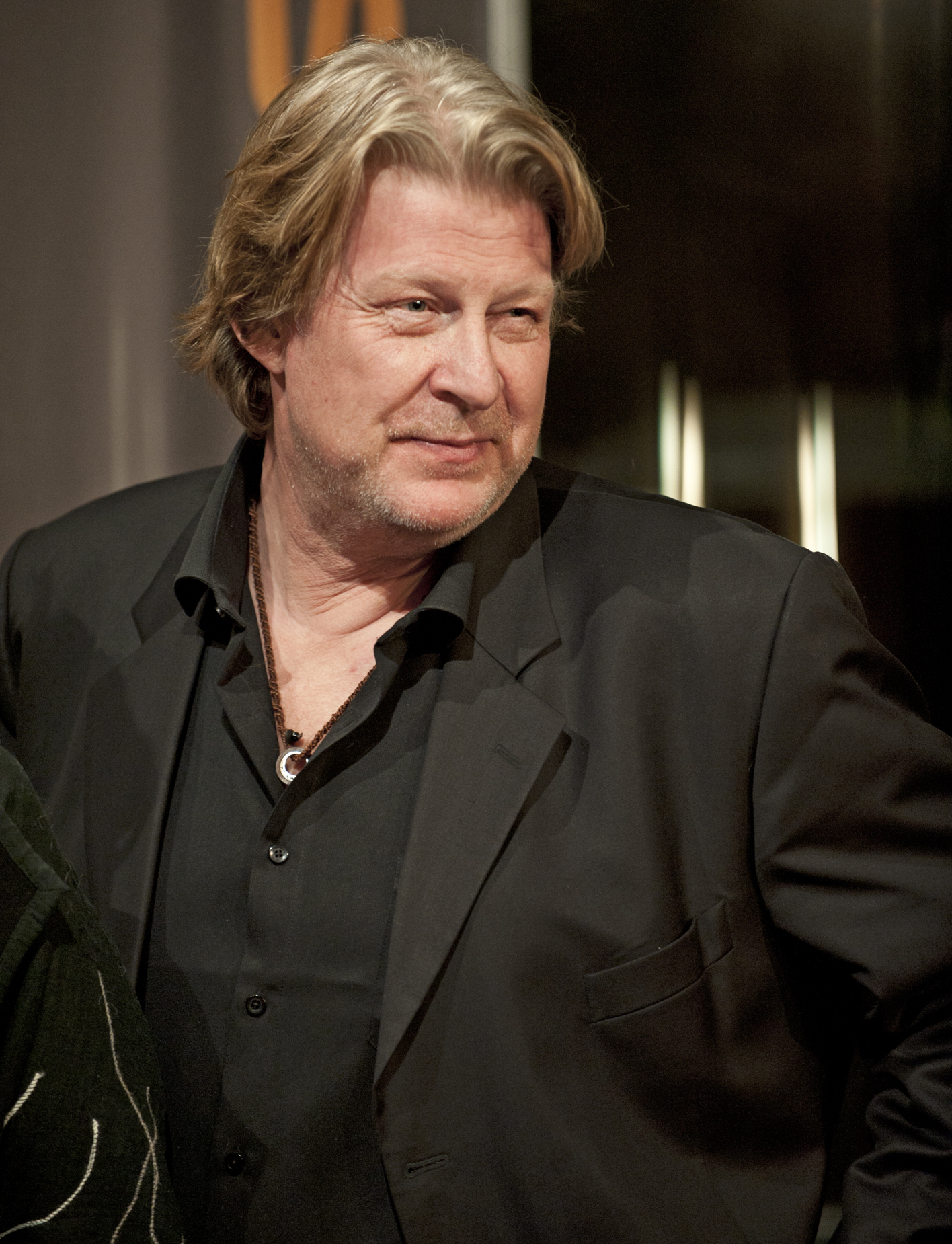
Rolf Lassgård, Best Actor winner

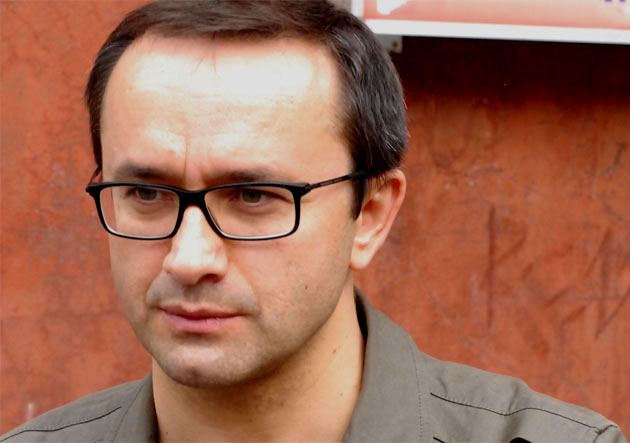
Andrey Zvyagintsev, Best Foreign Film winner

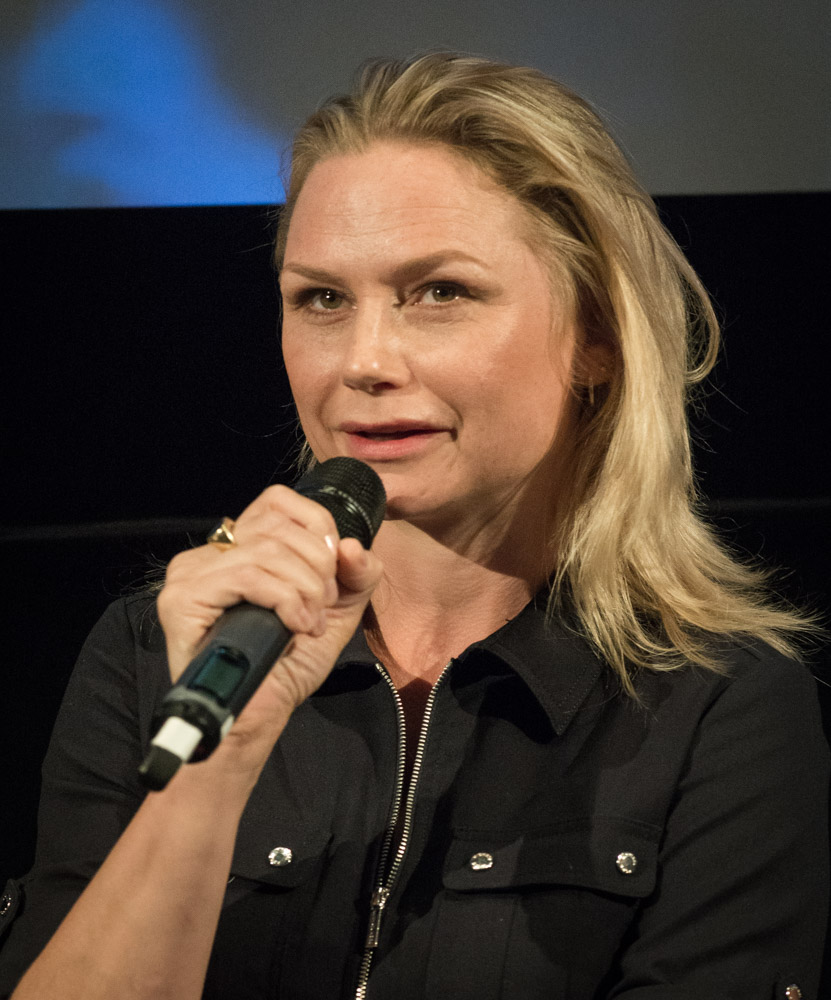
Malin Levanon, Best Actress winner

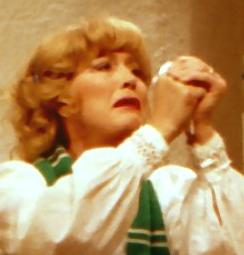
Birgitta Andersson, Honorary Award winner

Winners are listed first and highlighted in boldface.

**Best Film**: **The Here After – Madeleine Ekman**; A Man Called Ove – Annica Bellander and Niklas Wikström Nicastro; My Skinny Sister – Annika Rogell	**Best Director**: **Magnus von Horn – The Here After**; Sanna Lenken – My Skinny Sister; Peter Grönlund – Drifters
**Best Actress in a leading role**: **Malin Levanon – Drifters**; Shima Niavarani – She's Wild Again Tonight; Felice Jankell – Young Sophie Bell	**Best Actor in a leading role**: **Rolf Lassgård – A Man Called Ove**; Ulrik Munther – The Here After; Filip Berg – Eternal Summer
**Best Supporting Actress**: **Eva Melander – Flocking**; Bahar Pars – A Man Called Ove; Amy Deasismont – My Skinny Sister	**Best Supporting Actor**: **Mats Blomgren – The Here After**; Isaka Sawadogo – White People; Henrik Dorsin – Flocking
**Best Screenplay**: **Peter Grönlund – Drifters**; Sanna Lenken – My Skinny Sister; Ronnie Sandahl – Underdog	**Best Cinematography**: **Flocking – Gösta Reiland**; White People – Linda Wassberg; A Man Called Ove – Göran Hallberg
**Best Editing**: **Drifters – Kristoffer Nordin**; My Skinny Sister – Hanna Lejonqvist; My Life My Lesson – Anders Teigen	**Best Costume Design**: **Drifters – Mia Andersson**; A Holy Mess – Camilla Thulin; Kim – Stella J Hox
**Best Sound Editing**: **Jönssonligan – Den perfekta stöten – Andreas Franck**; White People – Andreas Franck; She’s Wild Again Tonight – Patrik Strömdahl and Jan Alvermark	**Makeup and Hair**: **A Man Called Ove – Eva von Bahr and Love Larson**; The Circle – Jenny Fred; White People – Jenny Fred
**Best Original Score**: **Flocking – Lisa Holmqvist**; The Circle – Benny Andersson; White People – Jon Ekstrand	**Best Art Direction**: **Drifters – Kajsa Severin**; There Should Be Rules – Ulrika Fredriksson; A Holy Mess – Matilda Afzelius
**Best Documentary Feature**: **Detained – Anna Persson and Shaon Chakraborty**; Every Face Has a Name – Magnus Gertten; Ingrid Bergman: In Her Own Words – Stig Björkman; Ute på landet – Anders Jedenfors	**Best Shortfilm**: **Kung Fury – David Sandberg**; Audition – Lovisa Sirén; Northern Great Mountain – Amanda Kernell
**Best Foreign Film**: (Russia) **Leviathan – Andrey Zvyagintsev**; (United Kingdom) (United States) Carol – Todd Haynes; (Mauritania) (France) Timbuktu – Abderrahmane Sissako	**Best Visual Effects**: **LasseMajas detektivbyrå – Stella Nostra – Torbjörn Olsson, Fredrik Pihl, Robert Södergren and Joel Sundberg**; The Circle – IXOR; A Man Called Ove – Torbjörn Olsson
**Gullspiran**: Barnfilmskolan: Linda Sternö, Kalle Boman, Martin Sjögren and Klara Björk	**Honorary Award**: **Birgitta Andersson**
**Newcomer Award**: **Bianca Kronlöf – Underdog**	**Cinema Audience Award**: **A Man Called Ove**; A Holy Mess; Heaven on Earth
