= Adelborg =

Swedish noble family

Adelborg is a Swedish noble family, which consists of two different lines. The older main line is descended from the burgher and brewer in Gothenburg Anders Eriksson, who died before February 1688. His son was the customs controller in Helsingborg Lars Andersson Borgh, who died 1719. His grandsons were the adjutant and later Captain Eric Otto Borgh (1741–1787) and his older brother Johan Borgh (1736–1805), who were ennobled 13 September 1772 at Stockholm Palace by King Gustavus III of Sweden with the name Adelborg, and were introduced 9 May 1776 at Riddarhuset as noble family number 2090.

The younger, non-related line is descended from the yard bailiff Lars Joensson in Långåker in Fredsberg. His son was the mountain bailiff Peter Larsson Borgh (1651–1692). His great-grandson Johan Aron Borgh (1742-28 September 1785), was ennobled at the same time as the above-mentioned brothers, 13 September 1772 with the same name and was introduced at Riddarhuset the same day as them, but died childless, making his line extinct.

The main line is of the same origin as the extinct noble Swedish family Borg, number 1570.

== Family members ==
- Erik Otto Borgh (1741–1787), Swedish Army captain, ennobled Adelborg in 1772
  - Per Otto Adelborg (1781–1818), military and artist
    - Bror Jacob Adelborg (1816–1865), naval officer and artist, brother of Anders Otto
      - Maria Adelborg (1849–1940), a textile artist, daughter of Bror Jacob, sister of Ottilia and Gertrud
      - Gertrud Adelborg (1853–1942), politician, sister of Ottilia and Maria
      - Ottilia Adelborg (1855–1936), artist, sister of Maria and Gertrud
    - Anders Otto Adelborg (1811–1862), Swedish Army captain, brother of Bror Jacob
      - Otto Ehrenfrid Adelborg (1845–1900), Swedish Army captain
        - Fredrik Adelborg (1886–1948), Consul General, the brother of Gustaf-Otto and Louise
        - Gustaf-Otto Adelborg (1883–1965), writer, grandson of Per Otto Adelborg, brother of Fredrik and Louise
        - Louise Adelborg (1885–1971), a designer and textile artist, sister of Gustaf-Otto and Fredrik
