= Hedvall =

Hedvall is a Danish and Swedish surname.

Notable people with the surname Hedvall include:

- Åke Hedvall (1910–1969), Swedish discus thrower
- Barbro Hedvall (born 1944), Swedish journalist
- Emil Hedvall (born 1983), Swedish footballer
- Oscar Hedvall (born 1998), Danish footballer
