= Bahar Pars =

Iranian-Swedish actress and director

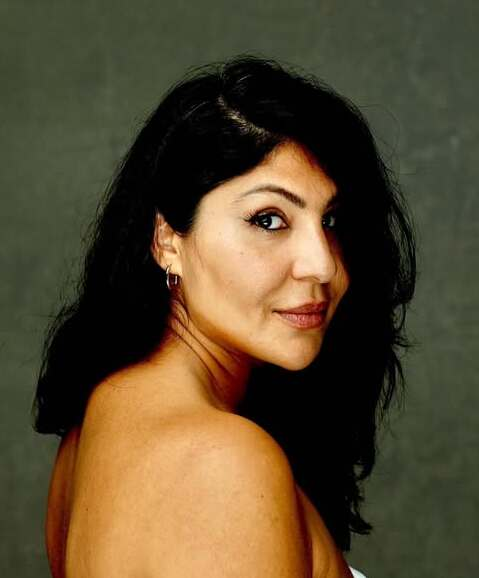
- Bahar Pars in 2023
- Born: Shiraz, Iran
- Occupations: Actor, film director, film producer, screenwriter
- Years active: 2006–present

Bahar Pars (Persian: بهار پارس) is an Iranian-Swedish actress and filmmaker. She has performed on stage and screen, and is best known for her supporting role in the 2015 film A Man Called Ove.

== Early life and education ==
Bahar Pars was born in Shiraz, Iran, and moved to Trelleborg, Sweden, in 1989 with her family after the war between Iran and Iraq.

Between 2003 and 2007 she studied to become an actress at Teaterhögskolan in Stockholm (now Stockholms dramatiska högskola).

== Career ==
Pars has had several roles in plays and also several films. She made her film debut in the 2006 film När mörkret faller. In 2008 she performed the role of Nina in Farnaz Arbabi's Måsen at Backateatern. At Uppsala City Theatre, Pars played the title roles in the plays Anna Karenina in 2010, the stage version of Låt den rätta komma in 2011, and Hedda Gabler in 2013, the latter directed by Farnaz Arbabi.

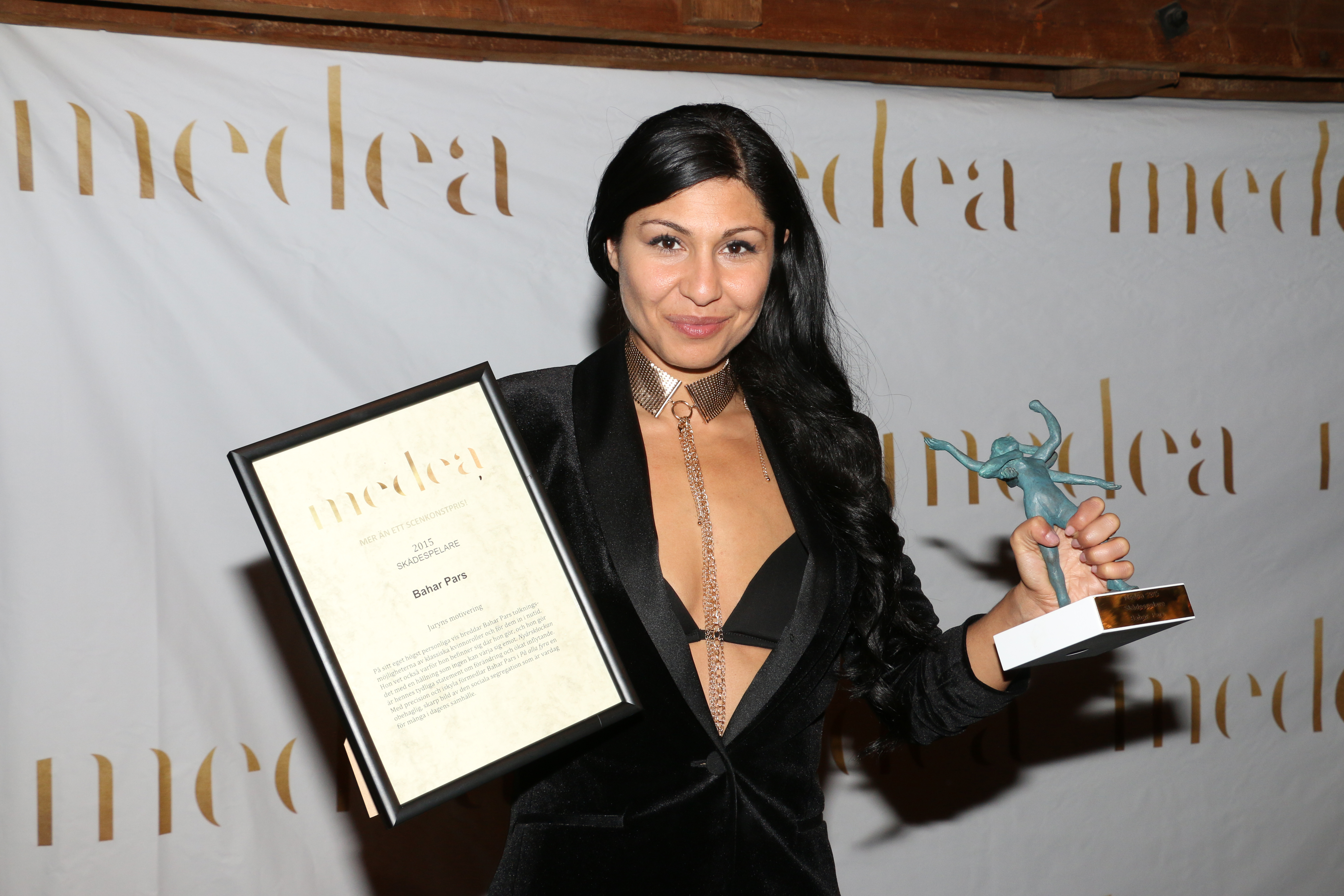
Bahar Pars receives her Medea Award in Stockholm, 2015

In 2014, Pars acted in the Jonas Hassen Khemiris play Jag ringer mina bröder as the character Valerie, directed by Farnaz Arbabi at The House of Culture (Stockholm). In November the same year she performed the monologue play På alla fyra at Kilenscenen at Kulturhuset Stadsteatern.

She had the leading role as Bertha in the play Marodörer, written and directed by Jens Ohlin at the Royal Dramatic Theatre in 2015.

Pars a co-creator of Nyårsklockan, in which 15 female celebrities appear.

== Awards ==
In 2015, she was awarded the Medea Award, with the citation "In her own personal way Bahar Pars widens the ways to play classical female roles and bring them into our present time".

In the 2016 Guldbaggen awards she was nominated in the Best Supporting Actress category for her role as Parvaneh in the 2015 film A Man Called Ove.

== Television ==
- 2008 Åkalla
- 2008 Kungamordet (TV Mini Series)
- 2010 Drottningoffret
- 2010 Kommissarie Winter
- 2014 Den fjärde mannen (TV Mini Series)
- 2015 Arne Dahl: En midsommarnattsdröm
- 2016 Finaste familjen
- 2016 Vårdgården
- 2016 Gåsmamman
- 2017 Syrror
- 2018 Conspiracy of Silence
- 2018 Black Lake
- 2022 Vi i Villa
- 2023 Ingen Ängel

== Filmography ==
- 2004 Flickpingis (Short Film)
- 2006 When Darkness Falls
- 2009 Knäcka
- 2009 Bebådelse (Short Movie)
- 2009 Portofino: The Philippines
- 2010 Fredlösa
- 2010 Händelse vid bank
- 2015 A Man Called Ove
- 2015 Rinkebysvenska (Director & Writer)
- 2016 Baby (Short Film)
- 2016 Zon 261
- 2017 Ariel (Short Film)
- 2017 TurkKiosken (Director)
- 2018 Operation Ragnarok
- 2022 Maya Nilo (Laura)
- 2022 The Year I Started Masturbating
- 2022 KageFabrikken
- 2023 Donkey Land (Director & Writer & Actress)
- 2023 The Conference
- 2024: Handling the Undead
