= The Conference (2023 film) =

2023 Swedish slasher film

- Directed by: Patrik Eklund
- Written by: Mats Strandberg
- Screenplay by: Patrik Eklund; Thomas Moldestad
- Based on: Konferensen
- Produced by: Ina Sohlberg
- Starring: Katia Winter; Adam Lundgren; Eva Melander; Bahar Pars; Amed Bozan; Maria Sid
- Cinematography: Simon Rudholm
- Edited by: Robert Krantz
- Music by: Andreas Tengblad
- Production company: SF Studios
- Distributed by: Netflix
- Release date: October 13, 2023
- Running time: 100 minutes
- Country: Sweden
- Language: Swedish

The Conference (Swedish: Konferensen) is a 2023 Swedish slasher film directed by Patrik Eklund and co-written with Thomas Moldestad based on the 2021 novel Konferensen by Mats Strandberg and starring Katia Winter, Adam Lundgren and Eva Melander. It premiered on Netflix in October 13, 2023.

== Plot ==
A team-building conference for municipal employees turns into a nightmare when elements of corruption begins to undermine and plague the retreat with a scorned man out to avenge the suicide of his father over a real estate scam entailing the construction of a non-utilitarian retail mall in a farming community.

== Cast ==
- Katia Winter as Lina
- Adam Lundgren as Jonas
- Eva Melander as Eva
- Bahar Pars as Nadja
- Amed Bozan as Amir
- Maria Sid as Ingela
- Christoffer Nordenrot as Kaj
- Claes Hartelius as Torbjörn
- Cecilia Nilsson as Anette
- Lola Zackow as Jenny
- Jimmy Lindström as Karl
- Martin Lagos as Roger
- Marie Agerhäll as Cleo
- Robert Follin as Sotis
- Margareta Pettersson (voice actor)

== Production ==
The screenplay was co-written by the director Patrik Eklund and Thomas Moldestad, based on the 2021 novel Konferensen by Mats Strandberg. A Netflix original film, it was produced by Ina Sohlberg for SF Studios. The crew also featured Guldbagge-winning Tove Jansson, Eva von Bahr and Love Larson as make-up artists, Ingrid Sjögren as costume designer, and Tim King and Jonathan Ridings as executive producers alongside Mats Strandberg, with Jimm Garbis as associate producer.

Most of the film was shot in Stockholm and its surrounding areas. In fact, the Mälaren lake is thought to be one of the shooting locations of Conference.

== Release ==
The Conference premiered globally on Netflix in October 13, 2023. It released during pre-Halloween season.

== Reception ==
On the review aggregator website Rotten Tomatoes, 74% of 19 critics' reviews are positive, with an average rating of 5.9/10.

Alexander Kardelo of MovieZine rated the film 4 out of 5 stars, deeming it a "brutally entertaining slasher comedy" and writing that "[it] offers its audience an intense nightmare experience that tickles the chest to death".

Karolina Fjellborg of Aftonbladet rated it 4 out of 5 stars, calling it "a festive, fresh breath of a slasher film, which combines some of the genre's most classic approaches with very Swedish characters, in a very Swedish context".

Mrinal Rajaram of Cinema Express rated the film 2.5 out of 5 stars, reckoning it is "based on an interesting premise" and "[brims] with potential" at first, but "loses a bit of itself in the slasher cliches", resulting in "the expectation [turning] soon to disappointment and [settling] eventually on boredom".

Emiliano Basile of EscribiendoCine rated it with 6 out of 10 points, stating that "Patrick Eklund makes a social satire-like slasher comedy that's shamelessly gore and a fun reflection on humans' incredible capacity to resist".

== Accolades ==
Year	Award	Category	Nominee(s)	Result	Ref.
2023	59th Guldbagge Awards	Best Makeup and Hair	Tove Jansson, Eva von Bahr and Love Larson	Won	
2023	59th Guldbagge Awards	Best Visual Effects	Alan Banis and Andreas Hylander	Nominated	
