= Amed Bozan =

Swedish actor (born 1989)

- Born: 1989 (age 37); Diyarbakır, Turkey
- Education: Stockholm Theatre Academy
- Occupation: Actor
- Known for: Caliphate
- Awards: Kristallen for Best Actor (2020)

Amed Bozan (born 1989) is a Swedish actor. He is best known for playing Husam in Caliphate (2020), for which he won a Kristallen for Best Actor. He also played the lead in Älskade Samir (2023) and had a major role in Cry Wolf (2024).

== Life and career ==
He was born in Diyarbakır and moved to Sweden in 1992, when he was three years old. He is Kurdish. He grew up in Sollentuna and graduated from the Stockholm Theatre Academy in 2019. He had his debut screen role in Caliphate (2020) as conflicted Islamic State fighter Husam. He won a Kristallen for Best Actor for his performance as Husam. In 2022, he appeared in Bra där! En hiphophistoria at Uppsala City Theatre.

== Acting credits ==
=== Film ===
Year	Title	Role	Notes	Ref.
2023	The Conference	Amir		

=== Television ===
Year	Title	Role	Notes	Ref.
2020	Caliphate	Husam		
2023	Älskade Samir	Samir		
2024	Cry Wolf	Kenneth		

=== Theatre ===
Year	Title	Role	Venue	Notes	Ref.
2020	Misantroperna	Arsinoë	Folkteatern		
2022	Bra där! En hiphop-historia		Uppsala City Theatre		

== Awards and nominations ==
Year	Award	Category	Work	Result	Ref.
2020	Kristallen	Best Male Actor	Caliphate	Won	
