= Caliphate (TV series) =

Swedish 2020 television series

- Release poster
- Swedish: Kalifat
- Genre: Thriller; drama
- Created by: Wilhelm Behrman
- Written by: Wilhelm Behrman; Niklas Rockström
- Directed by: Goran Kapetanović
- Starring: Gizem Erdogan; Amed Bozan; Aliette Opheim; Albin Grenholm
- Composer: Sophia Ersson
- Country of origin: Sweden
- Original language: Swedish
- No. of seasons: 1
- No. of episodes: 8

Production
- Executive producers: Lars Blomgren; Anna Croneman; Anette Mattsson; Lisa Widén
- Producer: Tomas Michaelsson
- Production locations: Stockholm; Jordan
- Running time: 46–53 minutes
- Production companies: Filmlance International; Imaginarium Films

Original release
- Network: SVT1
- Release: 12 January – 9 February 2020

Caliphate (Swedish: Kalifat) is a Swedish thriller drama television series. It premiered on 12 January 2020 on Sveriges Television. It became the most-viewed series ever on SVT Play.

The story is based on the real-life case of the Bethnal Green trio, in which three British teenage girls from London left home to join ISIS in Syria in February 2015. The television adaptation chiefly follows the characters of Fatima, a Swedish Security Service agent; Pervin, a young Swedish woman lured to Syria; and Sulle, an opinionated teenager groomed by ISIS. The plot explores and revolves around themes such as Islamic extremism, terrorism, tensions within Islam and among Muslims, women's rights, and human rights. All eight episodes were directed by Goran Kapetanović.

Branded as a Netflix Original, Caliphate was released globally on Netflix on 18 March 2020, and removed from the service on 1 September 2025.

== Plot ==
Pervin, a young Muslim woman from Sweden who lives in Raqqa, capital of ISIS-controlled Syria, with her husband Husam, a member of the Islamic State and their newborn daughter Latifa. Disillusioned with life in Syria, Pervin decides to return to Sweden. After acquiring a cell phone from her neighbor and friend Tine (who is dragged away from hiding in Pervin's home, where she is forced to remarry after her husband's death), she contacts Dolores, an anti-radicalization activist in Sweden. Dolores puts Pervin in touch with Fatima, who is an agent of the Swedish Security Service. Fatima is at odds with the leadership due to a previous incident with a person named "Lorentz". Fatima talks to with Pervin over the phone, and tries to work her for intelligence related to a terror attack being planned in Sweden, in exchange for a safe return to Sweden for Pervin, her husband and their daughter.

Pervin tells Fatima about a man named "Al Musafir" or the Traveler, who is in Sweden and is planning the attack. Al Musafir is Ibrahim "Ibbe" Haddad, who is working as a teacher's assistant in a high school, while recruiting others into his terror plan. He has successfully recruited two brothers – Jakob, a former prisoner and alcoholic, and Emil, the younger, mentally disabled sibling. The brothers have a strained relationship with their mother, who favors Emil and looks down on Jakob not only for his past but also for his conversion to Islam. Under a different identity, Ibbe also recruits Miryam, who was raised in Baghdad, and promises to get her married in exchange for her help in his plans.

Ibbe radicalizes young girls at the school by sharing ISIS recruitment videos and propaganda. He successfully recruits Sulle, a Palestinian activist, and her friend Kerima, both 15-year-old girls who start wearing hijabs and take lessons in following Sharia law. The girls are shown pictures of golden palaces and told that if they moved to the Islamic Caliphate, they could live in luxury and be special by marrying terrorists. Sulle's parents become aware to their daughter's radicalization, and try to stop her by threatening to marry her off to a relative in Jordan. Sulle inadvertently pulls her 13-year-old sister Lisha into the Islamic extremist ideology, the implications of which are not fully realized. At home, Kerima is physically abused by her alcoholic father, who has Post-Traumatic Stress Disorder after having fought in the Second Chechen War. Following her, Ibbe takes Kerima into his home to indoctrinate her further.

Fatima does not inform on Pervin to her superiors, but reveals some vague details about a terror plot. Her superiors tell her to drop the investigation, and have her suspended for consuming cannabis. She remains in touch with her friend Calle, who's also in the Security Service, and continues to share information with him. As she continues extracting information from Pervin and tries to piece together details of the plot, Fatima trails Jakob and Emil's when she investigates intel from Pervin about an abandoned shooting range. Jakob then tracks down her license plate.

Dolores and Ibbe are at an anti-radicalization meeting when he steps out to talk with Jakob. The host shows an ISIS video and points to a tattoo on the forearm of one of the terrorists. Later while at a cafe, Dolores sees the tattoo on Ibbe's arm. After Ibbe drops her off, she calls Fatima to tell her she has important information. Fatima asks Dolores to meet her at her apartment, where Dolores is fatally stabbed. An ordered has been issued to arrest Fatima, who she plans to escape. She goes to Dolores's house to get some cash and supplies, but two cops also enter. She locks them in a bedroom at gun point, before escaping, and becomes the subject of a manhunt. Fatima finds shelter at the home of her father's colleague.

Pervin becomes the focus of attention of Ahmed, one of Husam's colleagues. He arrives one night at her house and catches her talking to Fatima, so he starts raping her but is killed by Fatima, who dumps his body in her neighbors' well. Husam, under the influence of sleeping pills, happens to walk into the kitchen and see the blood on the floor, but Pervin convinces him that he is dreaming. He never forgets this and is convinced that he was the one who killed Ahmed, until Pervin finally reveals the truth to him.

Fatima seeks plans to extricate Pervin from Raqqa, while Sulle and Kerima travel to Turkey, but are picked up by Ibbe. Sulle's younger sister Lisha joins them in the car and they set off for the airport in Sweden. Sulle had lied to her parents about going to a basketball game. Her father Suleiman, who voices his disdain of religion, finishes work early and decides to go and watch her game, but is shocked to see that his daughters are nowhere to be found. He calls Calle, who informs authorities in Germany and Turkey. They track the girls to Istanbul, but realize that the girls' passports were switched, and they were actually in Ankara. They intercept the transport vehicle at the border between Turkey and Syria where they rescue Sulle and Kerima, though Lisha is en route to Syria.

Calle convinces Fatima to seek help from Pervin to save Lisha. Pervin and her daughter Latifa reached the transport vehicle when Fatima convinces her to return home and save Lisha. In return, she would come to Syria to rescue them all. Pervin convinces Husam to marry Lisha and make her his second wife.

Before leaving to carry out the terror attack, Jakob stabs his mother to death in the kitchen. Fatima pursues Jakob and Emil, but loses their trail after they switch cars at their mother's house. Fatima learns of the three targets minutes before the police close in on her location, and she is taken into custody before she can share any information. In return, she promises to extricate Husam along with Pervin and Lisha. The terror attacks are stopped by the Security Service, who knew about them all along and kept Fatima in the dark because they did not trust her. In exchange for her silence, she is released from jail. Ibbe detonates a bomb within a garage, and manages to escape by disguising himself as a woman.

Fatima travels to Syria to rescue Pervin, Lisha, and Husam. Minutes before she arrives, Husam's colleague Omar arrives to take him to perform a suicide bombing. Husam tries to buy time, but Lisha who is completely radicalized (even more so than her sister was) and unwilling to return to Sweden, reveals their escape plan to Omar. Omar shoots Pervin in the back and is about to shoot Husam, when Fatima arrives and shoots him dead. They quickly move to the car, while Lisha refuses to join them, so they leave her behind. They make it outside Raqqa, but Pervin dies just after the border post. A devastated Fatima helps the equally distraught Husam carries his daughter, and they successfully make it to Sweden.

Sulle and Kerima are interrogated by the Security Service. She gives up Ibbe's identity in an effort to save her sister Lisha. Kerima tries to commit suicide, and is taken to a mental health facility where she gets her hands on a cell phone and warns Ibbe that his cover may be blown. Calle goes to the school to bring Ibbe into custody, but Ibbe escapes. Kerima meets up with Ibbe and decides to participate in a new attack on a girls' concert. Kerima is to wear a suicide vest that is locked so that she cannot remove it once she puts it on. Ibbe convinces Kerima that he and Sulle are also part of the attack, and will be wearing similar suicide vests. Once at the concert, after putting on the suicide vest, Kerima texts Sulle; only to learn from that Ibbe had lied, and Sulle was not involved in Ibbe's plan at all. In the concert facility toilets, Kerima tries to remove the vest, but fails; so she instead warns some of the attendees in there, who flee, and has a final exchange with a tearful Sulle over the phone. The story ends when Ibbe detonates the bomb, killing her.

== Cast ==
- Gizem Erdogan as Pervin El Kaddouri
- Aliette Opheim as Fatima Zukić
- Nora Rios as Suleika "Sulle" Wasem
- Amed Bozan as Husam El Kaddouri
- Yussra El Abdouni as Lisha Wasem
- Arvin Kananian as Nadir Al-Shahrani
- Lancelot Ncube as Ibrahim "Ibbe" Haddad
- Said Legue as Omar Soudani
- Simon Mezher as Suleiman Wasem
- Amanda Sohrabi as Kerima
- Albin Grenholm as Calle Hammergren
- Marcus Vögeli as Jakob Johannisson
- Nils Wetterholm as Emil Johannisson
- Ala Riani as Tuba Wasem
- Dennis Önder as Abu Jibril
- Shada Helin-Sulhav as Miryam Khan
- Marcel Khouri as Ahmed Mohamedi
- Monica Albornoz as Dolores Costa
- Camilla Larsson as Sara
- Jonatan Qahoush as Khalaf
- Caisa Ankarsparre as Nyhetsankare
- Ali Jalal as Ali Chatik
- Ahmad Srour as Emiren
- Maria Alm Norell as Anna-Karin
- Nadeem Srouji as Karwan
- Donatas Simukauskas as Sjamil

== Production ==
The series was produced by Filmlance (The Bridge) for Swedish broadcaster SVT, and sold by Endemol Shine International. It is based on an idea by Wilhelm Behrman, who created the series together with Nikolas Rockström. It was directed by the Guldbagge-awarded director Goran Kapetanovic. It was shot in Stockholm and Jordan.
