= Louise Adelborg =

Swedish designer, textile artist

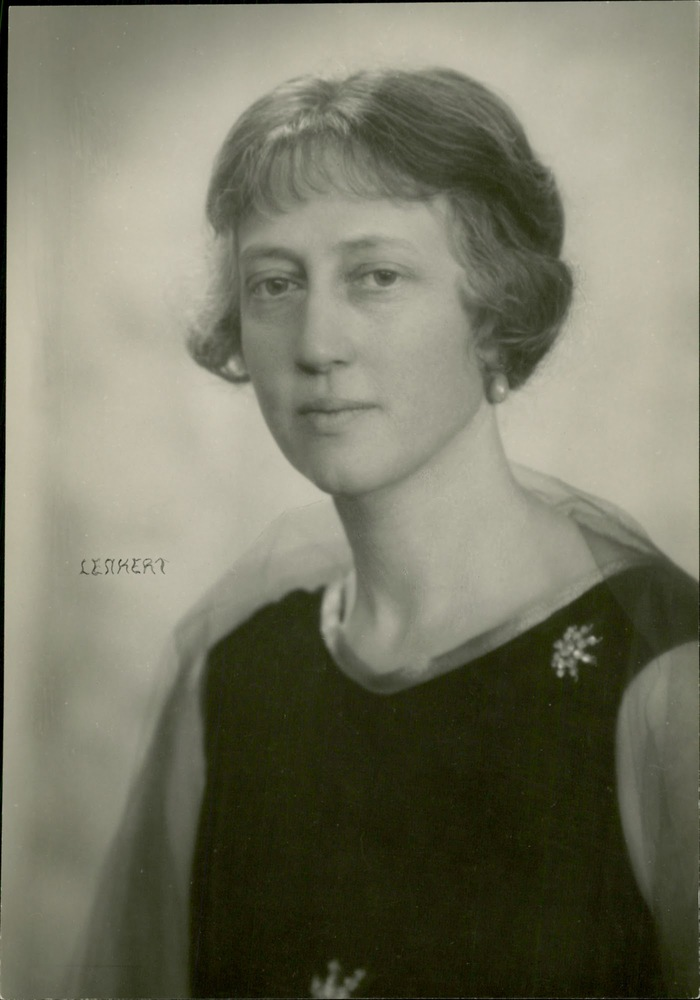
- Born: Louise Nathalie Adelborg; 2 July 1885; Ludgo, Sweden
- Died: 9 September 1971 (aged 86); Stockholm, Sweden
- Burial place: Norra begravningsplatsen
- Education: Technical School in Stockholm
- Occupations: Porcelain designer, textile artist
- Relatives: Gustaf-Otto Adelborg (brother); Fredrik Adelborg (brother)

Louise Nathalie Adelborg (2 July 1885 – 9 September 1971) was a Swedish porcelain designer and textile artist.

== Biography ==
Louise Adelborg was born in Ludgo, Södermanland County, Sweden, a member of the noble Adelborg family. She was the daughter of Jacquette De Geer and Otto Ehrenfrid Adelborg, a Swedish Army captain. Her brother Fredrik became a diplomat, and her brother Gustaf-Otto became a writer.

She graduated from the Technical School in Stockholm, following up with study trips to Italy and France. She began exhibiting ceramics and embroidery in 1916, and around the same time was tapped as a designer of patterns for the Rörstrand porcelain factory. She continued working for them until 1957, developing into a highly respected designer known for "an understated yet graceful modernism". Patterns she developed include Vase (1923) and the National Service (ca. 1930). National Service, later renamed Swedish Grace, features a wheat-ear motif and was exhibited at the Stockholm exhibition of 1930. Swedish Grace is still in production and considered an iconic design.

She was also greatly interested in embroidery and textile art. She created a number of textiles with religious motifs for church use, including an antependium for the Riddarholm Church. She also designed patterns for fabrics from Almedahl-Dalsjöfors.

Adelborg's work is held by the National Museum in Stockholm.

She was a member of the women's association Nya Idun. Adelborg was awarded the Illis quorum in the fifth size.

She died in 1971 in Stockholm and is buried at Norra begravningsplatsen ('Northern Cemetery') outside Stockholm.
