= Maria Adelborg =

Swedish artist (1849–1940)

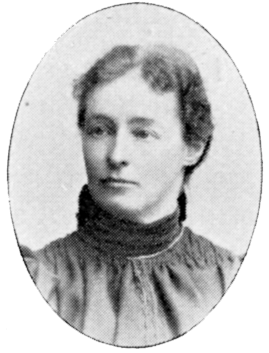
Eleonora Amalia Maria Adelborg - from Svenskt Porträttgalleri XX

Eleonora Amalia Maria Adelborg (December 6, 1849 – April 23, 1940) was a Swedish textile artist. She is best known for preserving Swedish textile art traditions. Her works include the carpet in the Birgitta Chapel in Rome and the chasubles for the Sofia Church in Stockholm.

== Biography ==
Adelborg was born in Kalskrona to Bror Jakob Adelborg and Hadvig Katarina on December 6, 1849. Between 1886 and 1899, she worked for the Swedish Art Exhibition created by Selma Giöbel and in 1900 she worked for the Friends of Handicraft. In 1907, she retired from HV and lived with her sisters, Ottilia Adelborg and Gertrud Adelborg in Gagnef. She was a member of the women's association Nya Idun, joining in 1888.
