= Malin Levanon =

Swedish actress

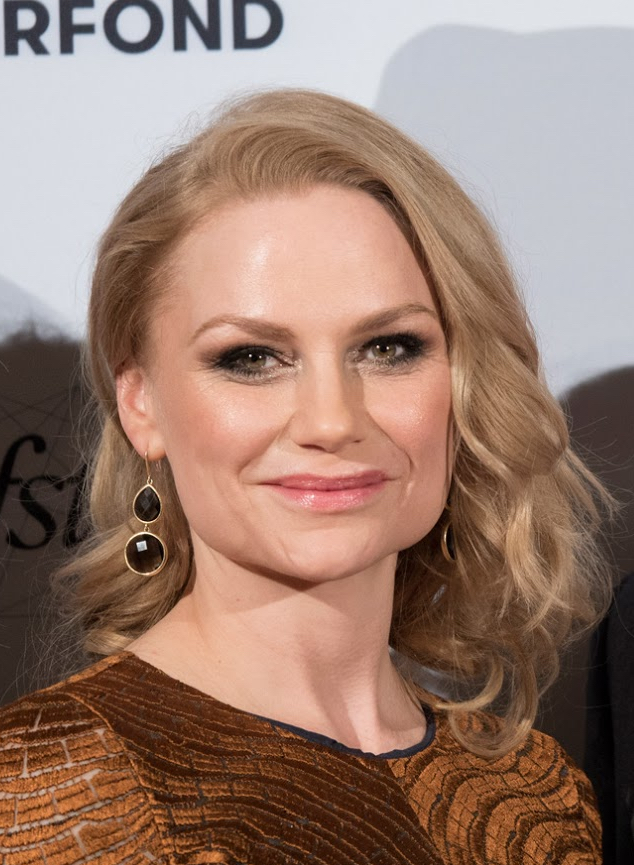
- Levanon in 2016
- Born: Anna Malin Johanna Norberg; 12 November 1977 (age 48); Gagnef, Dalarna, Sweden
- Occupation: Actress

Malin Vulcano Levanon (born 12 November 1977), also known as Malin Vulcano, is a Swedish actress.

She grew up in Gagnef in Dalarna, where she already at the age of eight made her acting debut in the annual summer plays that was made in her village. i She has studied Jerzy Grotowskis drama pedagogic, and has worked with Mike Leighs methods for films.

Levanon was awarded a Guldbaggen award in the category Best female lead role for 2016, for her lead role as the character Minna in the film Tjuvheder. The film won a total of five Guldbaggen awards. The same year she also played the character Mamman in the film Flocken, which she won the Filmpublicisternas award for "Film couple of the Year" along with colleague Eva Melander. Levanon has also acted in the film Återträffen with Anna Odell, which won the Kritikerpristet and Best Debut film at the Venice Film Festival in 2013. The film also won a Guldbaggen award for "best film". Levanon in 2016 also won the Northern Lights "Lights Award" Casters Critiques Choice honour award in Berlin.

Levanon played the leading role as the singer in the Italian film Pornodrome - Una storia dal vivo. She has acted in the film I skuggan av värmen, where she played the character Mia.

In 2011, Levanon acted in the SVT TV series Anno 1970, and in the TV series The Bridge she played the character Filippa. In 2012, Levanon played the character Kia in the novel film Gläntan. She won the honour award at the Stockholm International Film Festival.

In 2016, she acts in the TV series Black Widows opposite Cissi Forss and Peter Stormare. The series was broadcast on TV3.

== Filmography ==
- 2006 - Frostbite
- 2009 - I skuggan av värmen
- 2011 - Gläntan (short film)
- 2011 - Anno 1790
- 2011 - The Bridge
- 2013 - Återträffen
- 2015 – Flocken
- 2015 – Tjuvheder
- 2016 – Black Widows
- 2016 – 6A
- 2017 – (film) Krig
- 2019 – Britt- Marie var här
- 2020 – Off Radar
- 2020 – Kärlek & anarki
- 2022 – (TV-serie) Clark
- 2023 – Detektiven från Beledeweyne
- - The Ark: An Iron Sky Story – Post production
