= Ottilia Adelborg =

Swedish artist, writer (1855–1936)

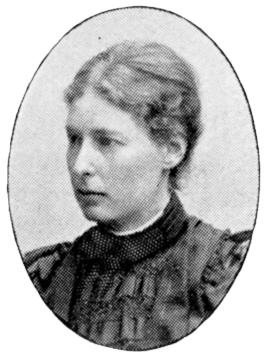
Ottilia Adelborg, 1901.

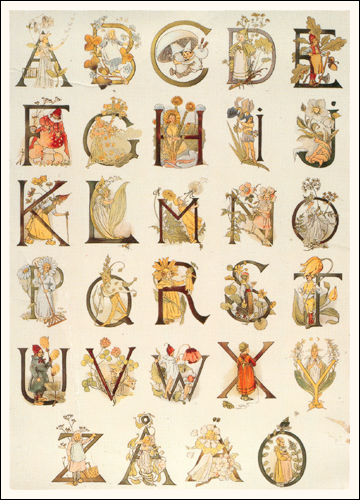
Page from Prinsarnes blomsteralfabet by Ottilia Adelborg.

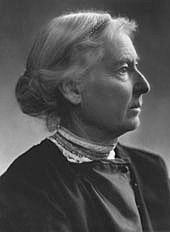
Ottilia Adelborg in later life, n.d.

Eva Ottilia Adelborg (6 December 1855 – 19 March 1936) was a Swedish children's book illustrator, comics artist and author and the founder of a school for lace making. A literary award, the Ottilia Adelborg Prize, was established in her honor in 2000, and there is an Ottilia Adelborg Museum in the municipality of Gagnef.

== Family and education ==
She was born in Karlskrona, Sweden, the daughter of Bror Jacob Adelborg and Hedvig Catharina af Uhr. She was the granddaughter of Erik Otto Borgh (1741–1787), a Swedish Army captain who was ennobled under the family name Adelborg by King Gustavus III of Sweden. Her sister Gertrud was a women's rights activist, while her sister, Maria Adelborg, also became an artist.

She showed early talent for drawing and studied at the Royal Academy of Art (1878–1884), and she later furthered her art education with trips to the Netherlands (1898) and Italy (1901) as well as France.

In 1888, she joined the women's association Nya Idun.

== Career ==
Adelborg quickly became known as a children's book illustrator, writing and illustrating over a dozen books between 1885 and 1920 and illustrating another dozen books for other authors. One of her best-known books was an alphabet of flowers, Prinsarnes blomsteralfabet (The Princes' Flower Alphabet, 1892), which was strongly influenced by the work of Walter Crane. The title referred to the fact that at the time there were three young princes in the Swedish royal household.

Another successful and much reprinted book was Pelle Snygg och barnen i Snaskeby (1896; in English as Clean Peter and the Children of Grubbylea, 1901).

These and other of her early works led to Adelborg being called "the creator of the Swedish picture book for children". Her style has been compared to that of both Crane and Elsa Beskow. She also designed wallpaper patterns and home furnishings. In 1911, she designed the poster for the first major exhibition of women artists held in Sweden. She received the Idun Award in 1926.

Adelborg was very interested in handicrafts and in 1899 became a member of the executive board of the newly formed Swedish Handicraft Association. In 1903, she moved to Gagnef, where she founded a school for lace-making and a local "Memory House" (Minesstugan) housing local crafts and historical artefacts. She died in Gagnef in 1936.

Her work is held by the Ottilia Adelborg Museum in Gagnef, by the Zorn Museum, and by the National Museum in Stockholm.
