= Flocking (film) =

2015 Swedish film directed by Beata Gårdeler

- Film poster
- Directed by: Beata Gårdeler
- Written by: Beata Gårdeler; Emma Broström
- Starring: Fatime Azemi
- Release dates: 15 February 2015 (Berlin); 11 September 2015 (Sweden)
- Running time: 110 minutes
- Country: Sweden
- Language: Swedish

Flocking (Swedish: Flocken) is a 2015 Swedish drama film directed by Beata Gårdeler. It won three awards at the 51st Guldbagge Awards and the main award at the 33rd Ale Kino! Festival.

== Cast ==
- Fatime Azemi as Jennifer
- John Risto as Alexander
- Eva Melander as Susanne
- Malin Levanon as Mia
- Henrik Dorsin as Tony
- Jakob Öhrman as David
- Mattias Kågström as Peo
- Pasi Haapala as Fredrik

== Production ==
It was filmed in Harads, in Norrbotten County.

== Reception ==
Flocking won a Crystal Bear at the 65th Berlin International Film Festival.
