= Gertrud Adelborg =

Swedish teacher, feminist and leading member of the women's rights movement

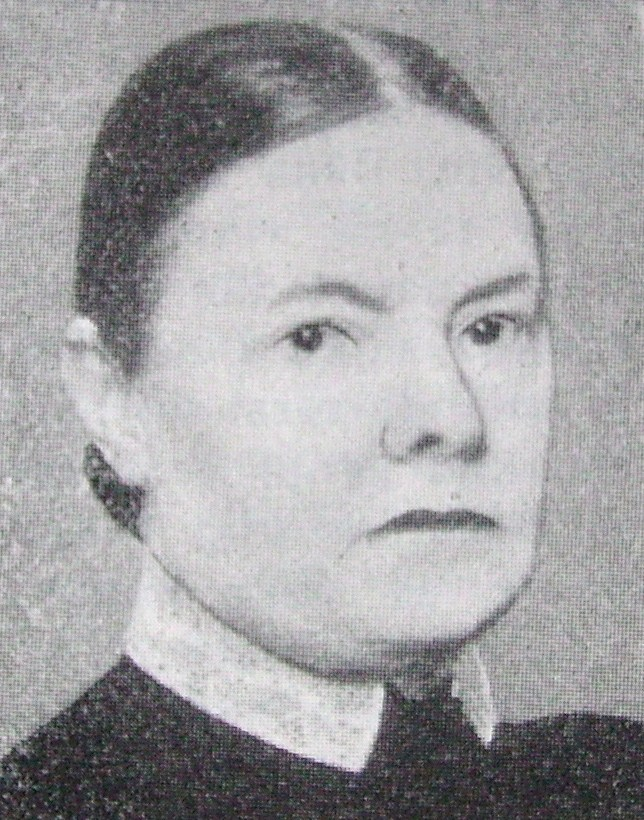
- Born: 10 September 1853; Karlskrona, Sweden
- Died: 25 January 1942 (aged 88)
- Resting place: Gagnef, Sweden
- Occupations: Educator, suffragist

Gertrud Virginia Adelborg (10 September 1853 – 25 January 1942) was a Swedish teacher, feminist and leading member of the women's rights movement.

== Biography ==
Gertrud Adelborg was born on 10 September 1853 at Karlskrona in Blekinge County, Sweden. She was the daughter of Naval Captain and nobleman Bror Jacob Adelborg (1816–1865) and his wife Hedvig Catharina af Uhr (1820–1903). She was the sister of book illustrator Ottilia Adelborg (1855–1936) and textile artist Maria Adelborg (1849–1940). She never married. Adelborg was educated by a governess at home and in girls' schools. She worked as a teacher from 1874 to 1879, and was employed at Svea Court of Appeal (Swedish: Svea hovrätt) from 1881 to 1883.

Adelborg was active within the Swedish women's movement and the struggle for women's suffrage. She worked for the bureau of the Fredrika Bremer Association (FBF) from 1884 to 1907 (from 1886 as chairperson of the Stockholm chapter) and was a member of the central committee of FBF from 1897 to 1915. She initiated the FBF Country School for Women (Swedish: Landthushållningsskola för kvinnor) at Rimforsa in Östergötland where she belonged to the school board from 1907 to 1921.

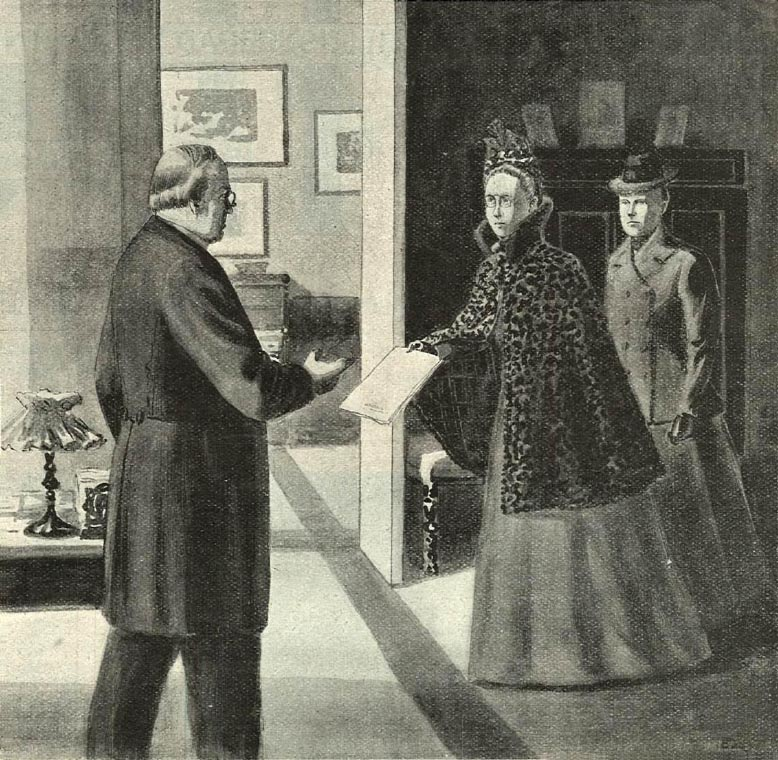
Agda Montelius and Gertrud Adelborg presents the petition of woman suffrage to Prime Minister Erik Gustaf Boström in 1899

In 1899, a delegation from the FBF presented a suggestion of women's suffrage to Prime Minister Erik Gustaf Boström. The delegation was headed by Agda Montelius, accompanied by Adelborg, who had written the demand. This was the first time the Swedish women's movement themselves had officially presented a demand for suffrage.

Adelborg was a member of the central committee in the National Association for Women's Suffrage (Swedish: Landsföreningen för kvinnans politiska rösträtt, LKPR) from 1903 to 1906. In 1907, she headed the LKPR delegation which presented their demand to the monarch King Oscar II of Sweden himself. She reminded Oscar II of the reforms regarding women's rights which had been passed by his father King Oscar I of Sweden, and continued by expressing her hope that "the son of Oscar I would attach his name to a suggestion of women's suffrage". According to Lydia Wahlström: "as soon as the king heard the name of his father, his interest was awoken", and Oscar II promised his support, but added that as a constitutional monarch he could not do much, and that the doubted the present government would. Adelborg's role within the suffrage work was described as important but less public: she took on secretarial tasks, made investigations, structured work and was the author of many of its publications and manifests.

She was a co-founder of the anti-sex trafficking organization Vaksamhet.

Adelborg lived in retirement at Gagnef in Dalarna County. She was awarded the Swedish Royal Medal of Illis Quorum in 1907. Gertrud Adelborg died in 1942 and was buried in Gagnef.

== Other sources ==
- Barbro Hedwall; Susanna Eriksson Lundqvist, red.(2011) Vår rättmätiga plats. Om kvinnornas kamp för rösträtt (Stockholm: Albert Bonniers Förlag) ISBN 978-91-7424-119-8 (Swedish)
- Walborg Hedberg; Louise Arosenius (1914) Svenska kvinnor från skilda verksamhetsområden (Stockholm: Albert Bonniers Förlag)
