= Gustaf-Otto Adelborg =

Swedish writer

Gustaf-Otto Adelborg (28 July 1883 – 18 December 1965) was a Swedish writer.

He was born in Ludgo Parish, which is now part of Nyköping Municipality, became a student in 1908, studying in both Uppsala and Stockholm. He was later employed at a second-hand bookshop in Stockholm.

Adelborg resembles Søren Kierkegaard, Carl Jonas Love Almquist, Fyodor Dostoyevsky and Vilhelm Ekelund in having published essays with primarily psychological content and religious meditations. Among these are Om det personligt andliga (1907), Våga, vedervåga (1908) and the personal confession Afsides (1923).

He criticised the Swedish academic environment in his book, Våga, vedervåga (Risk, jeopardize) published in 1908. A polemic with the Swedish writer Fredrik Böök made his writing career difficult.

He published very few works; his first three are hard to read, after which he evolved a clear language in which to express his convictions with "almost childlike seriousness".

Gustaf-Otto Adelborg came from a Swedish noble family, Adelborg, that included some well-known members. He was the brother of Fredrik Adelborg and Louise Adelborg.

== Sources ==
- Svensk uppslagsbok, 1929
