= Goran Kapetanović =

Bosnian-Swedish filmmaker (born 1974)

Goran Kapetanović (born 12 December 1974) is a Bosnian-Swedish writer, director, and adjunct in film directing at Malmö Theater Academy.

== Early life ==
Goran Kapetanović was born 12 December 1974 in Sarajevo, Bosnia and Herzegovina. When he was 17, his family fled the war in Yugoslavia and moved to Sweden. Kapetanović graduated in 2004 from the Stockholm Academy of Dramatic Arts with the short film En Familj.

== Career ==
He has directed short films such as Flykting 532 (2015), Kiruna-Kigali (2012), En familj (2004), and Eko (2004), as well as features such as Min Faster in Sarajevo (2016) and Krig (2017). He directed Caliphate (2020) and Knutby (2021).

Kapetanović has received more than 20 international prizes from a variety of cities and festivals. For Kiruna-Kigali, he won best short film at the Toronto Short Film Festival and was shortlisted for the Academy Awards 2013. For Min Faster i Sarajevo, Kapetanović received six nominations and won for best director at Guldbaggen in Sweden.

== Personal life ==
As of 2017, he lives in Malmö with his wife Karin and their two daughters.

== Filmmaking credits ==
Year	Title	Notes	Ref.
2004	En Familj	Short film	
2004	Eko	Short film	
2007	Litegrann från ovan	Short film	
2012	Kiruna-Kigali	Short film	

== Awards and nominations ==
Year	Award	Nominee	Result	Ref.
2004	Jameson Short Film Award	Eko	Won	
2012	Best Short Film at Peace & Love Film Festival	Kiruna-Kigali	Won	
