= Cry Wolf (Swedish TV series) =

Swedish crime thriller television series

- Also known as: Vargasommar
- Genre: Crime thriller
- Based on: Vargasommar (2020) by Hans Rosenfeldt
- Screenplay by: Hans Rosenfeldt; Oskar Söderlund
- Directed by: Jesper Ganslandt
- Starring: Eva Melander; Eliot Sumner; Henrik Dorsin; Amed Bozan; Nora Bredefeldt; Hannes Fohlin
- Countries of origin: Sweden, Finland
- Original languages: Swedish, Finnish, English, Russian
- No. of seasons: 1
- No. of episodes: 6

Production
- Producers: Josefine Tengblad; Eiffel Mattsson
- Running time: 45 min.
- Production company: C More

Original release
- Network: TV 4
- Release: 25 December 2024

Cry Wolf, or Vargasommar (Literally: Wolf summer), is a Swedish crime thriller television series, which was broadcast from 25 December 2024 via TV 4. It is based on Hans Rosenfeldt's novel, Vargasommar (2020), with the screenplay co-written by Rosenfeldt and Oskar Söderlund. The series was directed by Jesper Ganslandt. The main role is played by Eva Melander as Hannah Wester, a police detective, while Eliot Sumner plays Russian assassin Kat, and Henrik Dorsin plays Thomas Wester, Hannah's husband. It had premiered at Stockholm International Film Festival on 9 November 2024.

== Premise ==
Finnish and Russian criminal gangs meet in a disused quarry to transfer money for drugs. Russian sniper, Jaroslav opens fire on both groups. Although injured, Kat survives by hiding under a car. Jaroslav's partner Vadim collects both sets of bags and they drive south in a blue Golf car. Once they cross into Sweden, both men shoot at each other. Jaroslav's killed, Vadim steps out of the Golf to flag down an approaching car. Kenneth's driving, he is distracted by Sandra; their car hits the Golf and Vadim. Vadim crawls off the road to die in the forest. Kenneth and Sandra take the bags of drugs and money. Kenneth drives the Golf into his barn. Sandra helps dispose of Jaroslav's corpse. Sandra advises not to spend any money, carry on their lives as usual. Elsa reports to Hannah and Gordon that two dead wolves had eaten human flesh. Hannah discovers Vadim's remains. Kat recovers in a hunting platform. She sneaks into a police station, to read Vadim's death report. Kat informs his boss that she's following bags to Haparanda.

== Cast and characters ==
=== Main cast ===
The cast includes:

- Eva Melander as Hannah Wester: Haparanda police detective, Thomas' wife, Elin's mother
- Eliot Sumner as Kat: Russian gang's assassin, survived gangland shoot-out
- Henrik Dorsin as Thomas Wester: Hannah's husband, Elin's father
- Amed Bozan as Kenneth: wastrel, former prisoner for robbery, Sandra's partner
- Nora Bredefeldt as Sandra: prison officer, astrologist, tarot reader, Kenneth's partner
- Hannes Fohlin as Gordon: police chief, Hannah's boss and her clandestine lover
- Albin Grenholm as "UV" or Dennis: car repair shop owner, former prisoner, Kenneth's friend, Stina's husband, Lovis' father
- Olle Sarri as Greger: haulage company operator, major drug dealer
- Eero Milonoff as Sami: Oulu police officer

=== Recurring cast ===
- Lykke Fransson as Elin Wester: Hannah, Thomas' four-year old daughter; disappeared 19 years ago
- Vidmantas Fijalkauskas as Jaroslav / Yaroslav: Russian gang's sniper, survived shoot-out
- Mykolas Vildziunas as Vadim: Russian gang's member, survived shoot-out
- Mikaela Pålsson as Elsa: County Council agent, assisted by field tester, Uno
- Jesper Sjölander as Johnny: Greger's truck driver, henchman
- Marcus Stenberg as Raimo: UV's mechanic
- Otto Nyholm as Nicke: Greger's truck driver, Johnny's colleague
- Lisa Larsson as Stina: UV's wife, Lovis' mother

== Production ==
Cry Wolf is based on Hans Rosenfeldt's novel, Vargasommar (2020). Rosenfeldt and Oskar Söderlund co-wrote the screenplay for all six episodes, which were directed by Jesper Ganslandt. Rosenfeldt wrote initial drafts with Camilla Ahlgren (both had written The Bridge) before Söderlund was hired for the final screenplay.

It was produced by Nordic Drama Queens' Josefine Tengblad and Eiffel Mattsson. The project was commissioned by C More and TV 4. Nordic Drama Queens was co-founded by Tengblad with executive producers Sandra Harms and Line Winther Skyum Funch.

By March 2023, main cast members Eva Melander and Henrik Dorsin had been appointed. Filming occurred from July to October 2023, using locations in and around Haparanda, Sweden and Vilnius, Lithuania.

== Episode guide ==
.

No. in season	Title	Directed by	Written by	Original release date
1	"Part 1"	Jesper Ganslandt	Hans Rosenfeldt, Oskar Soderlund	25 December 2024
Elin walks forest's edge to waterway; wolves are nearby. Hannah wakes alongside Gordon, drives home to Thomas. Elsa to Hannah, Gordon: recent dead wolves ate human remains. Kenneth distracted while driving; collides with Golf and Vadim. Sandra, Kenneth find Jaroslav dead inside. Sandra takes bags of money, drugs. Hannah organises search party; she pairs with Gordon. Kenneth drives Golf into barn. They bury Jaroslav in shallow grave. Kat enters hunting platform to recover. Hunter discovers Kat, who feigns not understanding. Hunter notices Kat's bleeding, retrieves medical kit. Kat asks for hunter's quad bike. Kat kicks hunter off platform, collects axe from bike: kills hunter. Hannah crosses roadway, sees evidence of collision. Hannah, Gordon find Vadim's corpse. Sandra to Kenneth: fix car at UV's. Kenneth to UV: pay with Sandra's tax rebate. Kat inside Finnish police station, sneaks into office, reads Vadim's death report. Kat phones boss: bags are in Haparanda. After attending doctor's appointment, Thomas drives to forest cabin. Thomas pins up Elin's disappearance article. Hannah talks drugged youth, Jonte out of truck. On drive back, Jonte vomits over Hannah. Jonte taken into police custody. At home, Thomas' gone; Hannah leaves phone message, collapses on bed. Kat walks into town, steals pickup, crosses border into Sweden.
2	"Part 2"	Jesper Ganslandt	Hans Rosenfeldt, Oskar Soderlund	25 December 2024
UV drives into Sandra's yard, no-one answers. UV photographs damaged blue Golf. Criminal gangs meet. Before money and drugs exchanged, Jaroslav starts shooting. People kill each other. Kat's shot by ricochet; stabs rival, hides under vehicle. Jaroslav stands up, Vadim collects bags, signals Jaroslav. Vadim boards Jaroslav's Golf, travel towards Luleå. Both shoot each other, car crashes. Vadim outside, faces oncoming car: knocked down by it. Kenneth, Sandra find dead Jaroslav. Vadim stumbles into forest; wolves approach. Kat arrives in Haparanda; updates boss. Hannah to Gordon: one red car, one blue. Gordon: Oulu police recognised Vadim. Hannah, Gordon: stay at Oulu hotel. Kat watches drug trade, follows Jonte; knocks out Jonte. Hannah, Gordon have sex. Hannah's nightmare: searching for Elin. Jonte: buy drugs from Greger. Kat drowns Jonte; enters empty cabin, Thomas sees smoke. Thomas advises Kat how to reduce smoke. Sami: Vadim's Russian criminal; car at abandoned quarry. Quarry: rotting corpses. Hannah: sniper evidence. Kenneth seeks job; employers not hiring. UV asks Kenneth about Golf. Hannah arrives, asks for same car, UV denies fixing Golf. Kenneth evades UV. Kenneth to Sandra: police inquiring about Golf. Hannah, Kenneth push Golf into lake. Hannah attends Jonte's corpse. Kat visits Thomas.
3	"Part 3"	Jesper Ganslandt	Hans Rosenfeldt, Oskar Soderlund	1 January 2025
Years earlier: Kenneth begins prison sentence; meets UV. Sandra kisses Kenneth due to astrological signs. UV leaves prison. Present: UV's daughter, Lovis on IV drip. Uno, Elsa at lake; Uno points to Golf. Luleå police sending back up. Kenneth to UV: had car collision; took money, drugs. Kat watches Greger's worksite. Kat orders Gregor: find drugs, money in 24 hours, or die. Hannah, Gordon observe tow truck hauling Golf out. Hannah: bullet holes, blood spatter. Boot contains Jaroslav's rifle. Stina: cannot afford Lovis' care. UV promises situation will improve. Thomas tells Kat about Elin's disappearance. Forensic analyst: Russian army rifle. Hannah: public appeal on Golf. Medical receptionist phones for Thomas, reveals he's considering chemotherapy. Thomas to Hannah: has pancreatic cancer, did not want Hannah uncomfortable. Kat sees Hannah, Thomas. Thomas: rejecting chemotherapy; staying in cabin. Kat reviews Elin's disappearance. Kat learns Greger's left worksite. Greger's truck crashes into Kat's pickup. Kat crawls out of wreck. Greger scoffs at Kat. UV blackmails Kenneth for money. Kenneth: Sandra hid money. Hannah, Gordon question Russian émigré Jurij: no other Russians in area. Gordon alerted: accident in Nikkala. Upturned pickup; no witnesses. Hannah finds Elin's photo inside, she weeps, but does not mention it.
4	"Part 4"	Jesper Ganslandt	Hans Rosenfeldt, Oskar Soderlund	8 January 2025
Kat wakes, strapped into chair. Johnny attaches shock cables to Kat. Kat cries in pain, but does not answer. Years earlier: Thomas begins verandah. Hannah stores Elin's effects. Hannah resists registering Elin as dead; refuses to talk. Present: Gordon: pickup stolen in Finland fortnight ago. Kenneth evades UV. Greger goes outside. Johnny attempts to shock Kat, who breaks free: stabs Nicke, dead. Johnny reacts slowly, Kat escapes. Greger enters, orders Johnny to seek Kat. Greger grabs rifle from car. Greger shoots at shadows. Kat stabs Johnny, Greger kills Johnny. Greger drives away. Kat runs outside. Hannah in Oulu, questions pickup's owner. Arto: did not see thief nor recognise Elin. Sandra, Kenneth at dinner party. UV, Stina arrive. UV asks for money, Kenneth: hidden inside prison. Hannah attends Nicke's corpse. Gordon finds Johnny. Hannah: Greger's truck drivers. Hannah, Gordon at Greger's office, who feigns ignorance of their murders. Hannah notes Greger's terrified: he's uncooperative. Gordon addresses prison officers; describes murders, Golf. Sandra's frightened. Kenneth to Sandra: UV knows. Hannah visits Thomas, sees Elin's photos, articles. Thomas showed photos to foreign person. Hannah dreams of Elin. Hannah enters Kat's empty cabin. Kat watches from outside. Hannah leaves, Kat enters, Elin's photo's inside.
5	"Part 5"	Jesper Ganslandt	Hans Rosenfeldt, Oskar Soderlund	15 January 2025
Kat considers photo; visits Thomas. Kat learns Hannah's name. 19 years ago: Hannah drives car, sings with Elin. Hannah stops at roadhouse, leaves Elin in car. When Hannah returns, Elin's gone. Present: Sandra points shot gun at UV; Kenneth demands UV's phone. Kenneth duct tapes UV's forearms. Outside, UV runs: Sandra shoots his leg. Kenneth puts UV in car; drive into Finland. Kat steals quad bike, follows Hannah to station. Kat observes Hannah, Gordon. Police conference in town hall: Gordon coordinates communications; Hannah leads Haparanda investigations. Sandra, Kenneth take UV to forest cabin. Elsa to police: saw Kenneth driving Golf. Kat follows Hannah, Gordon. No answer at Sandra's home. Kenneth cooks, removes UV's tape so he can tend his wound. UV volunteers to sell drugs for Kenneth. Police dog finds Jaroslav's shallow grave. Hannah: send APB for Kenneth, Sandra. UV: Greger will help sell drugs. UV phones Greger, makes appointment for tomorrow morning. UV surreptitiously phones Stina. Stina: police hunting Sandra, Kenneth over dead body. Kat observes police at Sandra's. Kat enters Hannah's home; phones boss: getting bags, soon. Kat discovers Elin's box. Hannah arrives home; Kat confronts her, yells, runs away. Thomas arrives home. Thomas: same person at cabin.
6	"Part 6"	Jesper Ganslandt	Hans Rosenfeldt, Oskar Soderlund	22 January 2025
Hannah thinks Kat is Elin. Flashback: Kat enters building with gun. Man recognises Kat from orphanage, begs for life. Boss to Kat: you failed; sends Kat to Finland. Present: Hannah phones former investigator, Ralf for computer generated image of Elin at 12. Hannah recognises similarity to Kat. UV advises he meet Greger, alone: Greger's suspicious. Kenneth, Sandra drop UV off. Kat follows Greger to UV's workshop. Greger enters with rifle. Thomas: Kat's not Elin. Greger in UV's office, Kat follows, stabs Greger, dead. Sandra, Kenneth argue about trusting UV. Sandra leaves car. UV at workshop: discovers Greger's corpse. Kat: where's bags? UV begs for life, but falls downstairs. Kenneth leaves car for UV, toots horn, runs away. Kat exits, discovers bags inside boot. Witness: saw Kenneth, Sandra, UV pass. Hannah, Gordon enter workshop: UV, Greger dead. Kat phones boss: have bags. Kenneth finds Sandra at roadhouse. CCTV shows Kat killing Greger. Sami: Russian syndicate's assassin. Hannah returns to Thomas' cabin. Kat enters with rifle. Kat: I am Elin. Thomas: no, Elin's dead. Kat kills Thomas. Drives off, Hannah chases Kat, whose quad stalls. Hannah orders Kat to stop; shoots Kat, who drops bags. Hannah cannot find Kat, she drives back.

== Release ==
Cry Wolf premiered at the Stockholm International Film Festival on 9 November 2024. The series was broadcast on TV 4 from 25 December 2024.

== Reception ==
The series received a positive review in The Australian.
