= Emil Hedvall =

Swedish footballer (born 1983)

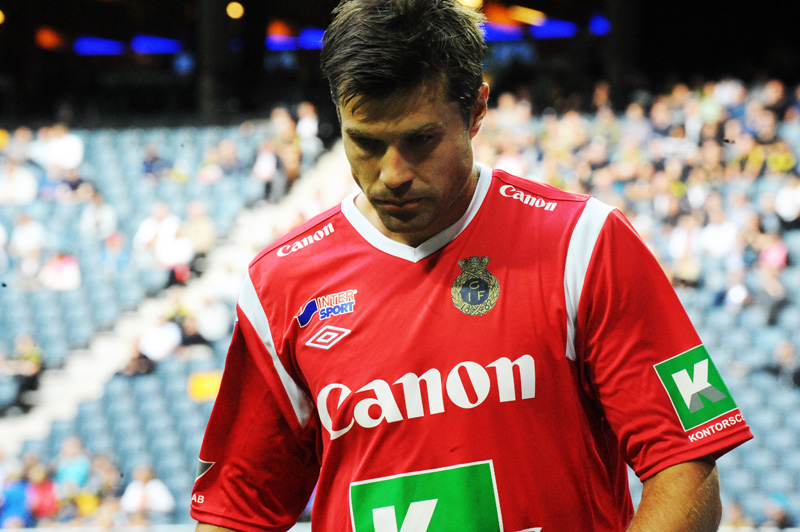

Personal information
- Full name: Lars Emil Hedvall
- Date of birth: 9 June 1983 (age 43)
- Place of birth: Leksand, Sweden
- Height: 1.91 m (6 ft 3 in)
- Position: Goalkeeper

Youth career
- Leksands IF
- IK Brage

Senior career*
Years	Team	Apps	(Gls)
2000	Leksands IF		
2001–2002	Forssa BK		
2003	Gagnefs IF		
2004–2005	Gestrike-Hammarby IF		
2006–2008	Söderhamns FF	22	(0)
2009–2016	Gefle IF	71	(0)
2017	Östersunds FK	0	(0)

International career
2000	Sweden U17	1	(0)
- * Club domestic league appearances and goals

Emil Hedvall (born 9 June 1983) is a Swedish retired footballer who plays as a goalkeeper.

He holds the record of most consecutives games on the bench in Allsvenskan without getting any playing time. After 119 straight games on the bench he finally got to start for Gefle IF in the first round of the 2013 Allsvenskan when Mattias Hugosson was out with a fever. He has also played for IK Brage, Forssa BK, Gagnefs IF, Gestrike-Hammarby IF and Söderhamns FF. In August 2017, Hedvall signed as an emergency back-up for Östersunds FK.
