= Farnaz Arbabi =

Iranian-born Swedish theatre director and playwright

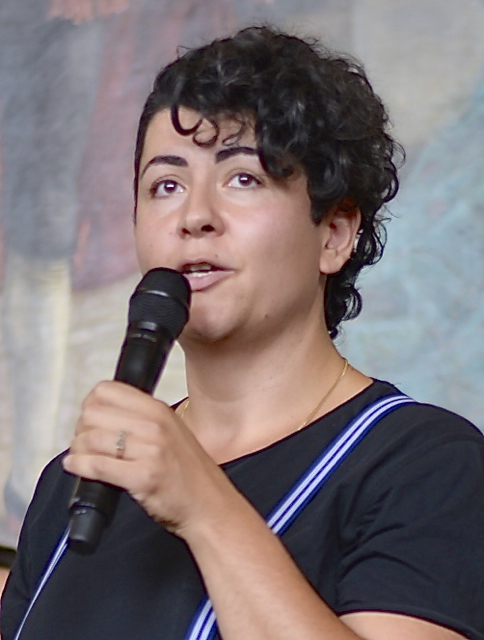
Arbabi at the Royal Dramatic Theatre fall season exhibit (2014).

Farnaz Arbabi (born 8 November 1977) is an Iranian-born Swedish theatre director, playwright and writer. She has been the creative co-director of Unga Klara since 2014.

== Biography ==
=== Early years and education ===
Farnaz Arbabi was born in Tehran, Iran. Her family moved to Sweden when she was two years old, and she grew up in Husby, Stockholm. After their arrival, her parents worked as native tongue language teachers. No one in her immediate surroundings worked in creative professions, but when she was eight years old her father entered her in the afterschool activities at Kulturskolan, Husby. She joined a youth theatre troupe with a high school friend and soon discovered an affinity for directing, rather than acting. At 19, she wrote the script for and directed her first play Nu känns det lite bättre ('It Feels a Bit Better Now'). During her youth, she would frequently go to shows at Unga Klara, and would later credit the theatre with some of here best experiences as an audience member.

In 2001, Arbabi served as an assistant to director Birgitta Englin for the performance of Elektra at Uppsala City Theatre. During 2002, she directed "teatergruppen STHLM" in Gbg01, about youths participating in the Gothenburg riots, at Teater Tribunalen in Stockholm. The play, which was based on interviews with actual participants, also showed at Stockholm City Theatre. With the support of Save the Children Swedish, she published Överlevnadshandbok för flickor om frihet och heder, a survival guide and orientation for girls subjugated by family honour, published following the murders of Pela Atroshi and Fadime Şahindal. In 2003, she received a journalism scholarship from Mentor Sweden presented by Queen Silvia of Sweden. Under the scholarship, she conducted interviews with former criminals and delinquents, who had recovered with the help of a mentor, gathering material for a play. She has pursued theatre and film studies at Stockholm University. She has also studied creative writing, journalism, and pedagogy. At 27 years old and already an established director, she applied to the Swedish Institute of Dramatic Art for a third time, successfully, eventually graduating as a director in 2008.

=== Breakthrough, Unga Klara, and the big stage ===
She rose to prominence in 2006 after directing Utvandrarna ('The Emigrants') for the National Swedish Touring Theatre and Jonas Hassen Khemiri's Invasion at Stockholm City Theatre. The former was a re-imagining of the classic Swedish emigration story, instead it related the story of Bosnian-, Persian-, and Russian-speaking immigrants to Sweden. The play thereby juxtaposes Sweden's historical status as an emigrant nation with its current role as a goal for immigrants. The latter was regarded as a breakthrough for both Arbabi as a director (Note: Some sources emphasize Utvandrarna, or both plays in conjunction as her breakthrough.) and for Khemiri as a playwright, as well as one of the most important performances in modern Swedish theatre. In a retrospective of the last 150 years of Swedish creative work by Dagens Nyheter, it was credited with "luring a new generation to the theatres". It was the first of several collaborations between Arbabi and Khemiri.

In 2014, as Suzanne Osten stepped down, Arbabi and Gustav Deinoff became the creative directors of Unga Klara. The pair published a manifesto upon taking their positions, promising to abide by the principles of "norm critique, feminism, anti-racism, pluralism and equality". Unga Klara was bestowed status as Nationalscen ('National Scene') for children and youth theatre in 2018.

Arbabi revived Angels in America for the 2018 Royal Dramatic Theatre season. She initially cast Rikard Wolff as Roy Cohn, but as Wolff's health was failing he was replaced by Staffan Göthe, and Wolff passed away as repetitions were held. In För att jag säger det ('Because I Say So'), she explored the power dynamics of the parent–child relationship. The play was given at various venues in Sweden and internationally. Johannes Anyuru's August Prize-winning novel They Will Drown in Their Mothers' Tears was rewritten for the stage by Arbabi. The dystopian alternate reality story dealing with racism and terrorism was given at Unga Klara in 2020. In 2022, she directed the senior year students at Malmö Theatre Academy in Brinn, which she had co-written with Elmira Arikan. The play relates the story of two troubled teens and how their group home burned down, inspired by interviews with youths staying at such facilities, staff, and official records; the ensemble cast takes turns playing the protagonists. The play opened at Unga Klara in the fall. In late 2022, Arbabi directed the Swedish theatre play version of Don Giovanni at Düsseldorfer Schauspielhaus. In the spring of 2023 she directed Cabaret at the Royal Dramatic Theatre, with funk-rock group Damn! as the acting house band.

After being sold out for the year, Brinn was renewed for a third season in the spring of 2023. She is directing the musical 9 to 5 for the 2023 fall season at Uppsala City Theatre.

=== Family ===
She married actor, director, and playwright Jens Ohlin in 2009. They have three children together.

== Themes ==
She has worked with themes of identity, belonging and social exclusion. In plays like X and Vitsvit, she has dissected murkier parts of Swedish history, exploring the influence of colonialism and racism, as well as Swedish identity.

== Awards ==
- 2006 – The Swedish Theatre Critics' prize
- 2007 – The Swedish Theatre association's Wilhelm Moberg scholarship
- 2014 – The Swedish Peace and Arbitration Society's Peace prize (with Jonas Hassen Khemiri)

== Bibliography ==
- 2002 – with Lotta Fristorp: Överlevnadshandbok för flickor om frihet och heder (in Swedish). Rädda barnen. ISBN 9173210471.
