= Gagnefs IF =

Swedish football club

- Full name: Gagnefs Idrottsförening
- Nickname: GIF
- Founded: 1923
- Ground: Siljansvallen; Gagnef; Sweden
- Chairman: Lars Eriksson Brink
- League: Division 4 Dalarna
Home colours

Gagnefs IF is a Swedish football club located in Gagnef.

== Background ==
Gagnefs IF currently plays in Division 4 Dalarna which is the sixth tier of Swedish football. They play their home matches at the Siljansvallen in Gagnef.

The club is affiliated to Dalarnas Fotbollförbund. Gagnefs IF have competed in the Svenska Cupen on 9 occasions and have played 14 matches in the competition.

== Season to season ==
In their most successful period Gagnefs IF competed in the following divisions:

Season	Level	Division	Section	Position	Movements
1980	Tier 5	Division 5	Dalarna		Promoted
1981	Tier 4	Division 4	Dalarna	5th	
1982	Tier 4	Division 4	Dalarna	6th	
1983	Tier 4	Division 4	Dalarna	11th	Relegated
1984	Tier 5	Division 5	Dalarna		Promoted
1985	Tier 4	Division 4	Dalarna	10th	Relegated
1986	Tier 5	Division 5	Dalarna		

In recent seasons Gagnefs IF have competed in the following divisions:

Season	Level	Division	Section	Position	Movements
2005	Tier 5	Division 4	Dalarna	10th	
2006*	Tier 6	Division 4	Dalarna	5th	
2007	Tier 6	Division 4	Dalarna	3rd	
2008	Tier 6	Division 4	Dalarna	11th	Relegated
2009	Tier 7	Division 5	Dalarna	2nd	
2010	Tier 7	Division 5	Dalarna	1st	Promoted
2011	Tier 6	Division 4	Dalarna	8th	

* League restructuring in 2006 resulted in a new division being created at Tier 3 and subsequent divisions dropping a level.
