= Fredrik Adelborg =

Swedish diplomat, director, explorer, donor and author

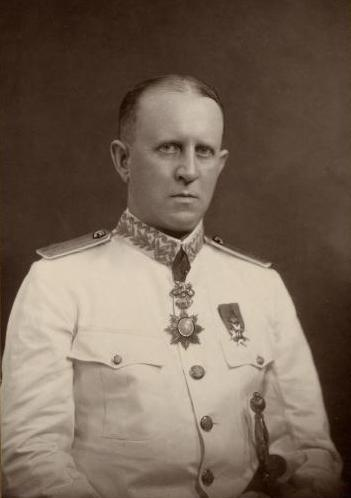
- Adelborg as Consul General in Singapore in 1929.
- Born: Fredrik Hjalmar Adelborg; 18 October 1886; Ludgo, Södermanland County, Sweden
- Died: 21 September 1948 (aged 61)
- Occupations: Diplomat, director, explorer, donor, author
- Spouse: Elisabeth Gyllenstierna (m. 1916)
- Relatives: Gustaf-Otto Adelborg (brother); Louise Adelborg (sister)

Fredrik Hjalmar Adelborg (18 October 1886 – 21 September 1948) was a Swedish diplomat, director, explorer, donor and author.

== Early life ==
Adelborg was born on 18 October 1886 at Öster-Malma Castle in Ludgo, Södermanland County, Sweden, the son of Captain Otto Adelborg and Baroness Jacquette De Geer. He was the brother of Gustaf-Otto Adelborg and Louise Adelborg.

== Career ==
Adelborg was a sea cadet and attended the Royal Swedish Naval Academy from 1901 to 1903 and served in the Merchant Navy and carried out two complete global circumnavigations. He completed mate's examination and an examination in steam engine teaching at Stockholm Navigation School in 1907. He became a reserve under-lieutenant in the Swedish Navy in 1908 and was secretary to the vice consul at the Swedish consulate in Bristol from 1908 to 1909.

He lived in the Malay Peninsula, Federated Malay States from 1910 to 1934 where he was head of different rupper companies; Director Assistant of the Gali Rubber Company in Penang 1910-11, Deputy CEO of the Gomali Rubber Company in Johor 1911-12, CEO of the Lower Perak Rubber Company in Perak 1912-16, Head of the Jendarata Rubber Company in Teluk Anson 1916-21 and CEO and Head of the Siginting and Pelepak Valley Rubber Company in Port Dickson from 1922. Adelborg undertook expeditions for the exploration of the Sakai in the Malay Peninsula from 1911 to 1929 and did extensive travels in the Orient. Adelborg conducted field trips to China, French Indochina, Java and Sumatra, Ceylon and Egypt from 1910 to 1922. He donated large zoological collections to the Swedish Museum of Natural History in 1921.

Adelborg was a delegate at the International Rubber Congress in London in 1921, Consul General of Sweden in Singapore from 1928 to 1934 and chief of staff of the International Committee for Non-Intervention in Spain from 1937 to 1939. He was head of the courier department at the Ministry for Foreign Affairs from 1940.

He was a member of the Royal Asiatic Society of Great Britain and Ireland and an associate of the Associate Incorporated Society of Planters. He was permanent member of the Swedish Society for Anthropology and Geography.

== Personal life ==
In 1916, he married the baroness Elisabeth Gyllenstierna af Lundholm (1894–1985), the daughter of the Captain Baron Carl Gyllenstierna and Malin Crafoord. Together they had one son, Anders Fredrik Adelborg (1917-1990).

== Death ==
Adelborg died on 21 September 1948. He was interred on 28 September 1948 at Norra begravningsplatsen in Stockholm.

== In popular culture ==
Fredrik Adelborg inspired Evert Taube to the events in the ballad "Möte i monsunen" (Meeting in the monsoon), when he described to Taube how he had helped shanghaied Swedish sailors during his time as Consul General of Sweden in Singapore. In ballad he is named as the person helping Fritiof Andersson.

== Awards ==
- (Sweden) Knight of the Order of the Polar Star (1944)
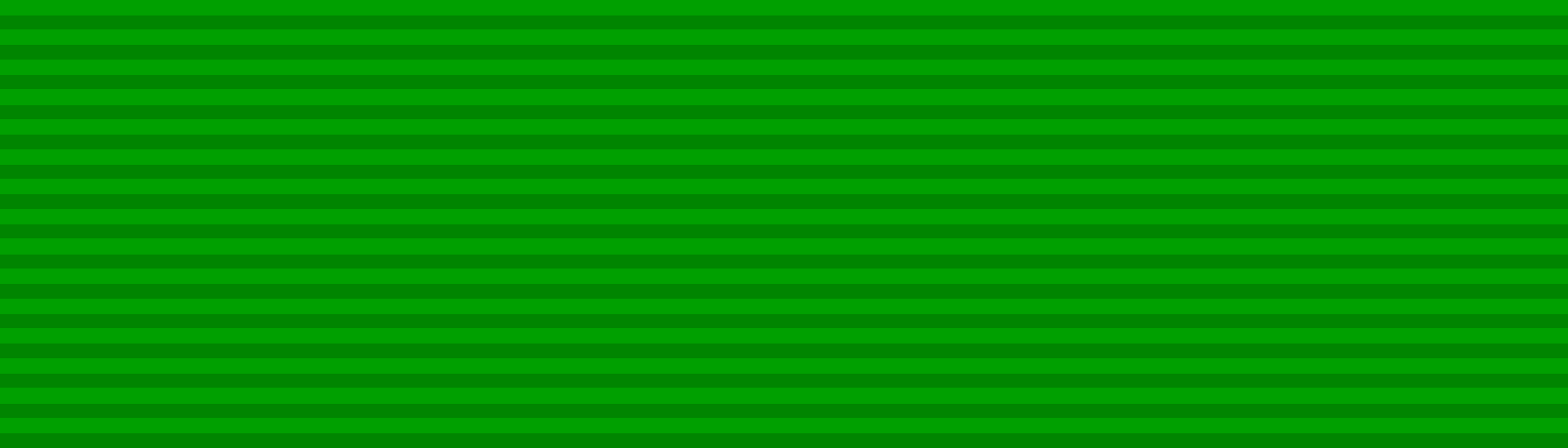
- (Sweden) Knight of the Order of Vasa (15 September 1921)
- Knight of the Order of St John in Sweden
- (France) Commander of the Imperial Order of the Dragon of Annam
- (France) Knight of the Legion of Honour
- (Sweden) Royal Swedish Academy of Sciences' Wahlberg Medal (1921)

== Bibliography ==
- Adelborg, Fredrik (1934). På blåa hav och i mörka urskogar [On the blue sea and the dark primeval forests] (in Swedish). Stockholm: Bonnier. SELIBR 1350550.
- Adelborg, Fredrik (1936). Djungelliv: Verklighetsskildringar från Malackas urskogar [Jungle life: Reality depictions of Malacca's ancient forests] (in Swedish). Stockholm: Hökerberg. SELIBR 1360341.
- Adelborg, Fredrik; Munthe, Axel (1943). Från vida världen: berättelser [From the wide world: stories] (in Swedish). Stockholm: Bonnier. SELIBR 2535591.
