= My Skinny Sister =

2015 film by Sanna Lenken

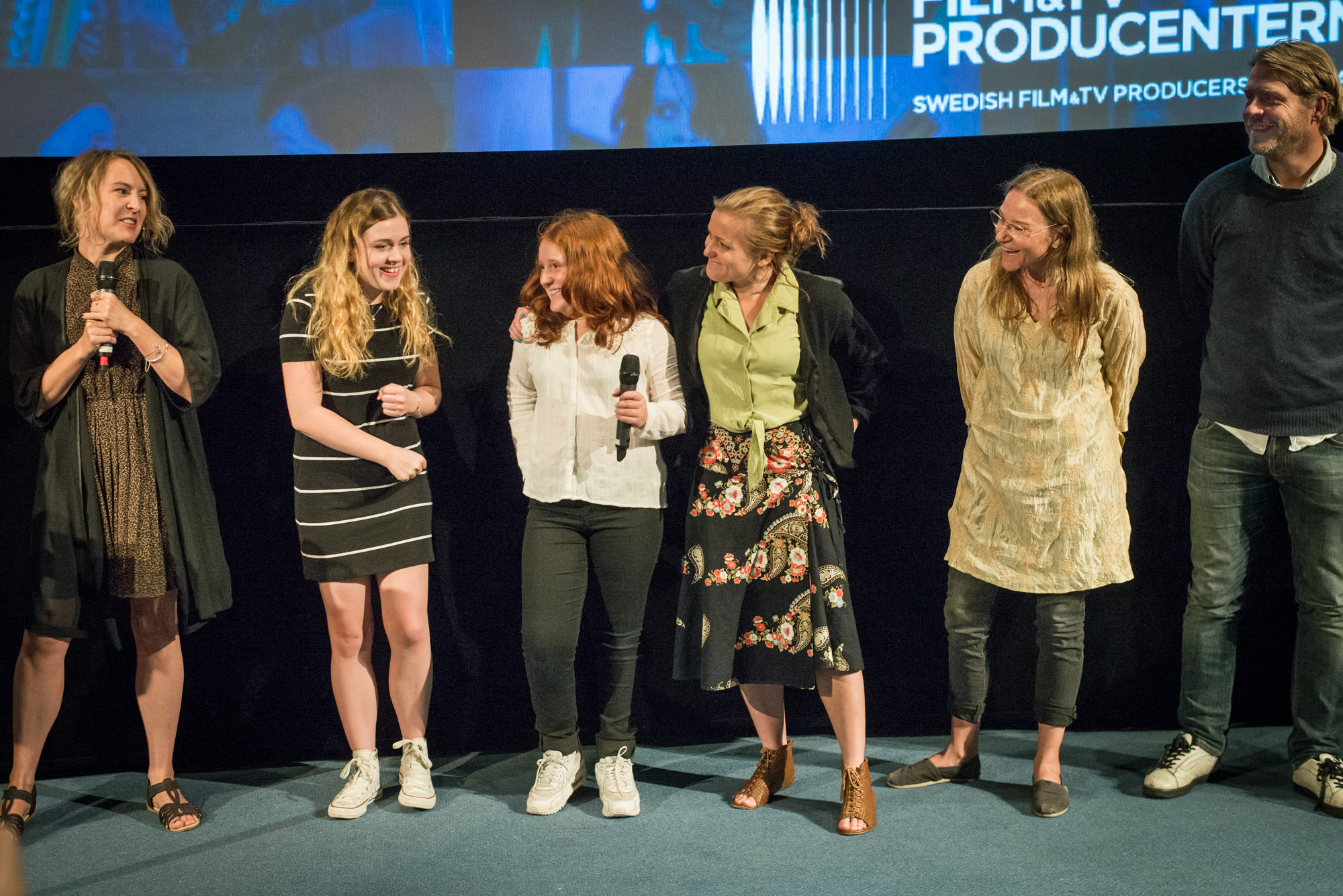
The team behind 'My Thin Sister', Filmhuset, Stockholm, August 17, 2015.

My Skinny Sister (Swedish: Min lilla syster) is a 2015 Swedish drama film directed by Sanna Lenken. The film stars Rebecka Josephson and Amy Deasismont. Lenken was anorexic as a teenager, and previously made a short film also about eating disorders.

== Plot ==
As Stella enters what she hopes will be the exciting world of adolescence, she discovers that her big sister and role model, Katja, is hiding an eating disorder. The disease slowly tears the family apart.

== Cast ==
- Rebecka Josephson as Stella
- Amy Deasismont as Katja
- Henrik Norlén as Lasse
- Annika Hallin as Karin
- Maxim Mehmet as Jacob

== Critical reception ==
Variety wrote of the film, "[..] Sanna Lenken brings some humor and charm to a difficult issue before ultimately spiraling into moralistic Afterschool Special territory".

The film won the Crystal Bear at the 2015 Berlin International Film Festival and the Audience Award at the Gothenburg Film Festival.

== See also ==
- Thin Blue Line (Swedish TV series), partly directed by Sanna Lenken
