= Barbro Hedvall =

Swedish journalist (born 1944)

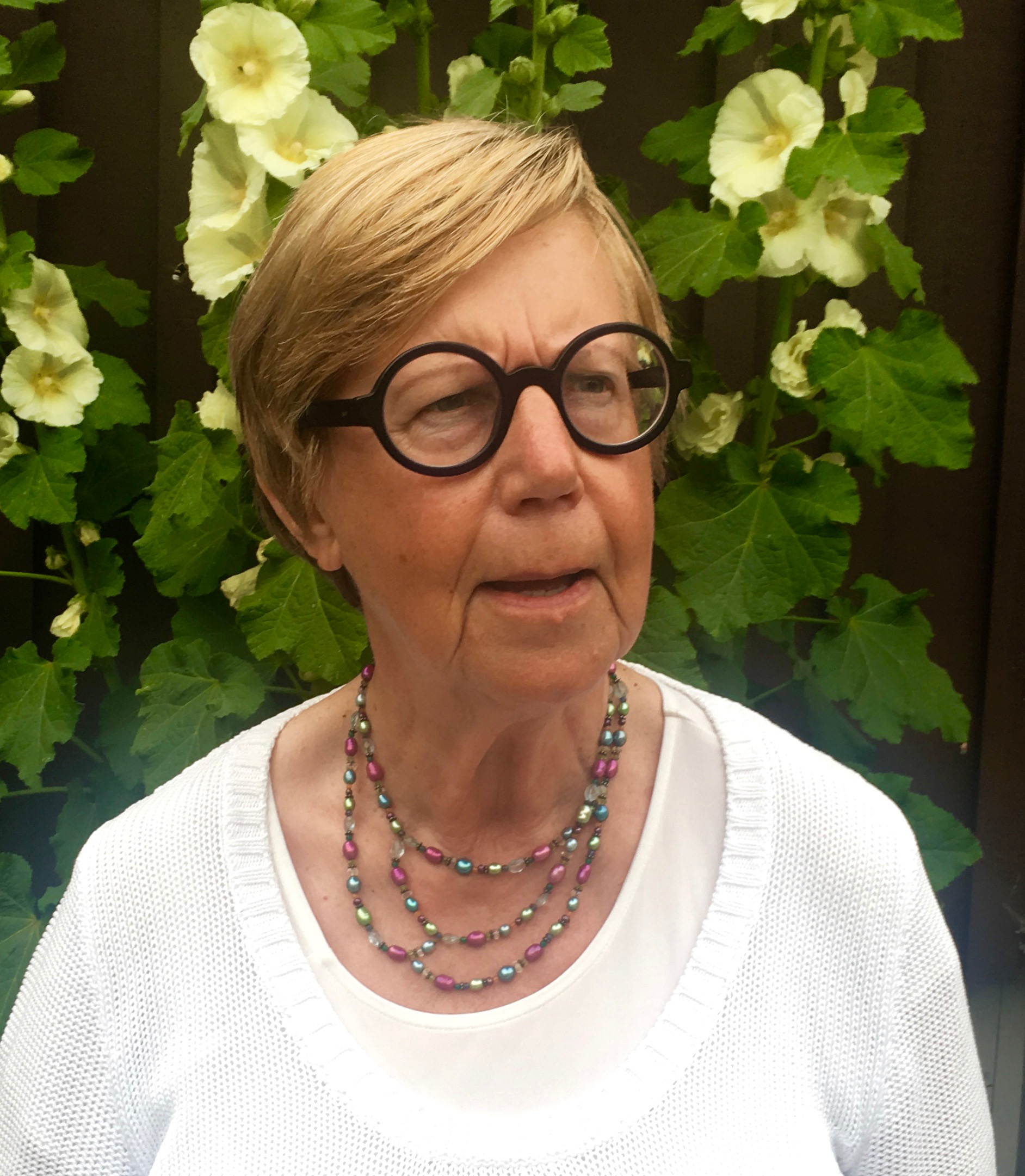
- Born: 8 February 1944 (age 82); Bromma
- Occupation: Journalist
- Notable work: Kvinnan i politiken

Barbro Christina Hedvall (born 8 February 1944) is a Swedish journalist and author.

== Biography ==
Hedvall was born in Bromma. She was an editorial writer for Dagens Nyheter between 1999 and 2009, and before that she was an editorial writer for Expressen for nineteen years. Hedvall is frequently a guest at the SVT morning show and along with Göran Greider, she has written a book called Stil och politik about political fashion.

== Bibliography ==
- 1975 – Kvinnan i politiken, ISBN 91-7160-179-1
- 2011 – Vår rättmätiga plats: om kvinnornas kamp för rösträtt , ISBN 978-91-7424-119-8
