= Gagnef =

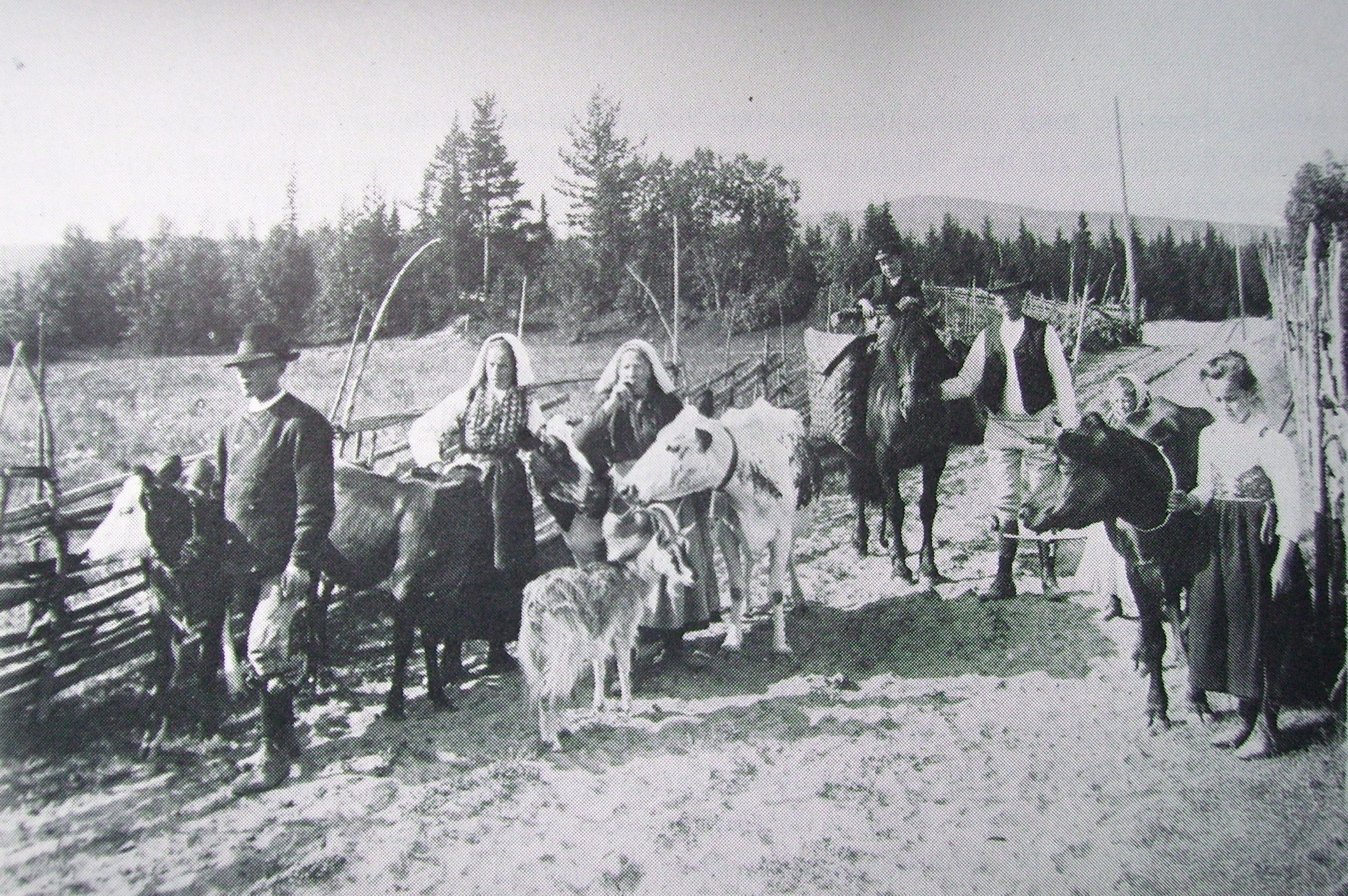
- Gagnef in 1911

- Location within Dalarna Location within Sweden
- Coordinates: 60°36′N 15°05′E
- Country: Sweden
- Province: Dalarna
- County: Dalarna County
- Municipality: Gagnef Municipality

Area
  - Total: 2.40 km^{2} (0.93 sq mi)

Population (13 Mars 2020)
  - Total: 10 328
  - Density: 437/km^{2} (1,130/sq mi)
- Time zone: UTC+1 (CET)
  - Summer (DST): UTC+2 (CEST)

Gagnef (Swedish pronunciation: [ˈɡâŋːnɛv]) is the second largest locality situated in Gagnef Municipality, Dalarna County, Sweden with 1,049 inhabitants in 2010. Gagnef consists of several small villages: The Church Village, Kyrkbyn, The Station Village, Stationsbyn, Moje, Moje, Tjaerna, Tjärna, Graev, Gräv, Gaersholn, Gärsholm, Gagnefs Grauda, Gagnefs Gråda, Osterfors, Österfors, Vaesterfors, Västerfors, Nordbaeck, Nordbäck, Gagnefsbyn, Gagnefsbyn, Nordauker, Nordåker and Pellesgaurdarna, Pellesgårdarna.

Actress Malin Levanon comes from Gagnef. The artist Ottilia Adelborg lived there for several decades, and there is now an Ottilia Adelborg Museum in Gagnef.

== Sports ==
The following sports clubs are located in Gagnef:

- Gagnefs IF
