= Eva Melander =

Swedish actress (born 1974)

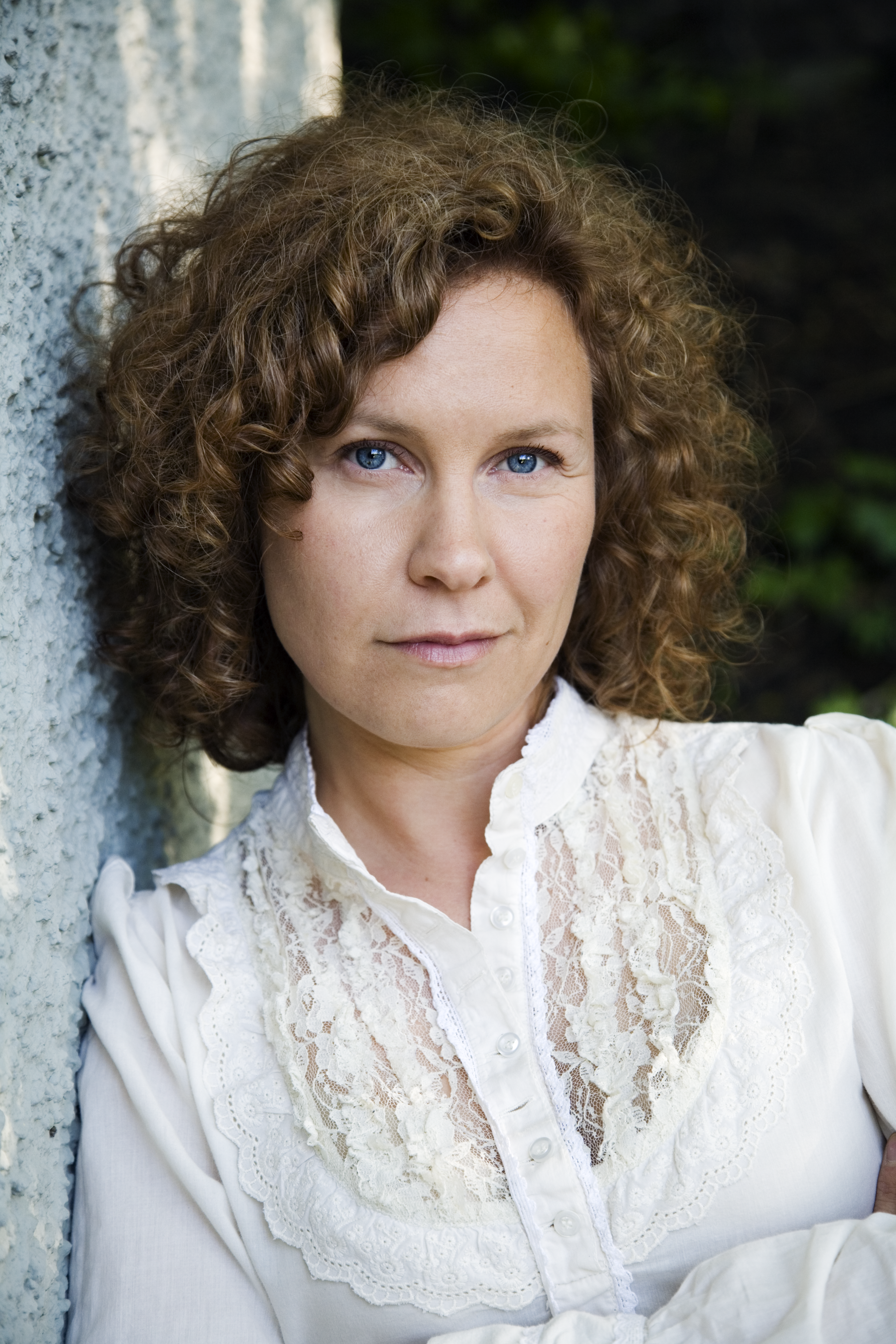
- Melander in 2012
- Born: 25 December 1974 (age 51); Gävle, Sweden
- Occupation: Actress

Eva Melander (born 25 December 1974) is a Swedish actress. She has appeared on stage as well as in feature films and TV series. She is known for playing a lead role as Tina in the 2018 dark fantasy drama Border.

== Early life and education ==
She was born and raised in the Hagaström area of Gävle, Sweden. Melander studied at the Malmö Theatre Academy from 1998 to 2002.

== Career ==
She appeared in a National Swedish Touring Theatre stage production of Knacka på din egen dörr in 2004. Melander performed in Lars Norén’s War at Riksteatern, Malin Axelsson’s Monster Cabinet at Unga Klara and Laura Ruohonen's The Great Monkey at Stockholm City Theatre. She has also participated in Timmaren with Rita at Dalateatern. In autumn 2010 she played in the acclaimed performance Reports #1- Animals that die at Riksteatern, written and directed by Marcus Lindeen.

On television, Melander has acted in the SVT drama series Graven (The Grave; 2004) and Lasermannen, both directed by Mikael Marcimain, and Mästerverket, directed by Linus Tunström.

She had one of the main roles in the 2010 feature film Sebbe, which won the Guldbagge Award for Best Film. She also featured in the film adaptation of The Hypnotist, directed by Lasse Hallström.

Melander gained significant attention for the starring role of Tina in the 2018 dark fantasy drama Border, which was selected as the Swedish entry for the Academy Awards competition for Best Foreign Film.

Melander plays the lead role as officer Hannah Webster in the 2024 Swedish Nordic noir TV series Cry Wolf (Vargasommar), co-written by Oskar Soderlund and Hans Rosenfeldt.

== Selected filmography ==
- Flocking (2015)
- Border (2018)
- Charter (2020)
- Codename: Annika (2023)
- Cry Wolf (2024)
- Je m'appelle Agneta (2026)
