= Audie Award for Fiction =

Annual literary award

The Audie Award for Fiction is one of the Audie Awards presented annually by the Audio Publishers Association (APA). It recognizes excellence in narration, production, and content for a fiction audiobook released in a given year, typically excluding speculative fiction. Before 2008, the award was known as the Audie Award for Unabridged Fiction. It has been awarded since 1996.

== Winners and finalists ==
=== 1990s ===
Award Year	Audiobook	Author(s)	Narrator(s)	Publisher	Result	Ref.
1996 1st	The Homecoming (1964)	Earl Hamner, Jr.	Richard Thomas	Audio Renaissance	Winner	
1996 1st	Dead Man's Walk (1995)	Larry McMurtry	Will Patton	Simon & Schuster Audio	Finalist	
1996 1st	Montana 1948 (1993)	Larry Watson	Beau Bridges	Simon & Schuster Audio	Finalist	
1997 2nd	The Green Mile (1996)	Stephen King	Frank Muller	Penguin Audiobooks	Winner	
1997 2nd	The Runaway Jury (1996)	John Grisham	Frank Muller	Random House Audio	Finalist	
1997 2nd	Odyssey (8th-7th century BC)	Homer (trans. Robert Fagles)	Ian McKellen	Penguin Audiobooks	Finalist	
1998 3rd	The Breaker (1973)	Kit Denton	Terence Donovan	Bolinda Audio	Winner	
1998 3rd	American Pastoral (1997)	Philip Roth	Ron Silver	Dove Audio	Finalist	
1998 3rd	Lolita (1955)	Vladimir Nabokov	Jeremy Irons	Random House Audio	Finalist	
1999 4th	A Widow for One Year (1998)	John Irving	George Guidall	Random House Audio	Winner	
1999 4th	Oliver Twist (1838)	Charles Dickens	Miriam Margolyes	Audio Partners Publishing Corp.	Finalist	
1999 4th	Summer Sisters (1998)	Judy Blume	Kate Reading	Books on Tape	Finalist	

=== 2000s ===
Award Year	Audiobook	Author(s)	Narrator(s)	Publisher	Result	Ref.
2000 5th	I Know This Much Is True (1998)	Wally Lamb	George Guidall	Recorded Books	Winner	
2000 5th	Duane's Depressed (1999)	Larry McMurtry	Larry McMurtry	NewStar Media	Finalist	
2000 5th	The Testament (1999)	John Grisham	Frank Muller	Bantam Doubleday Dell Audio	Finalist	
2001 6th	Fierce Invalids Home from Hot Climates (2000)	Tom Robbins	Keith Szarabajka	Bantam Doubleday Dell Audio	Winner	
2001 6th	Dubliners (1914)	James Joyce	Frank McCourt, Malachy McCourt, Dan O'Herlihy, Brendan Coyle, Aaron Hinds, T. P. McKenna, et al.	HarperAudio	Finalist	
2001 6th	War of the Rats (1999)	David L. Robbins	George Guidall	Recorded Books	Finalist	
2002 7th	The Talisman (1984)	Stephen King and Peter Straub	Frank Muller	Simon & Schuster Audio	Winner	
2002 7th	Bel Canto (2001)	Ann Patchett	Anna Fields	Blackstone Audio	Finalist	
2002 7th	Priestess of Avalon (2000)	Marion Zimmer Bradley	Bernadette Dunne	Books on Tape	Finalist	
2003 8th	Middlesex (2002)	Jeffrey Eugenides	Kristoffer Tabori		Winner	
2003 8th	Atonement (2001)	Ian McEwan	Jill Tanner		Finalist	
2003 8th	Austerlitz (2001)	W. G. Sebald	Richard Matthews		Finalist	
2003 8th	Sea Glass (2002)	Anita Shreve	Judith Ann Gantly		Finalist	
2003 8th	Unless (2002)	Carol Shields	Joan Allen		Finalist	
2004 9th	All Over Creation (2004)	Ruth Ozeki	Anna Fields		Winner	
2004 9th	The Five People You Meet in Heaven (2003)	Mitch Albom	Erik Singer		Finalist	
2004 9th	Monstrous Regiment (2003)	Terry Pratchett	Stephen Briggs		Finalist	
2004 9th	The Namesake (2003)	Jhumpa Lahiri	Sarita Choudhury		Finalist	
2004 9th	The Last Detective (2003)	Robert Crais	James Daniels		Finalist	
2005 10th	The Darling (2005)	Russell Banks	Mary Beth Hurt		Winner	
2005 10th	Going Postal (2004)	Terry Pratchett	Stephen Briggs		Finalist	
2005 10th	I Am Charlotte Simmons (2004)	Tom Wolfe	Dylan Baker		Finalist	
2005 10th	Jonathan Strange & Mr Norrell (2004)	Susanna Clarke	Simon Prebble		Finalist	
2005 10th	Our Sunshine (1991	Robert Drewe	Michael Veitch		Finalist	
2006 11th	A Slight Trick of the Mind (2005)	Mitch Cullin	Simon Jones		Winner	
2006 11th	The Last Kingdom (2004)	Bernard Cornwell	Jamie Glover		Finalist	
2006 11th	Road to Purgatory (2004)	Max Allan Collins	Stanley Tucci		Finalist	
2006 11th	Survivor in Death (2005)	J. D. Robb	Susan Ericksen		Finalist	
2006 11th	The Motive (2004)	John Lescroart	David Colacci		Finalist	
2007 12th	Rise and Shine (2006)	Anna Quindlen	Carol Monda		Winner	
2007 12th	Restless (2006)	William Boyd	Rosamund Pike		Finalist	
2007 12th	Telegraph Days (2006)	Larry McMurtry	Annie Potts		Finalist	
2007 12th	The Prestige (1995)	Christopher Priest	Simon Vance		Finalist	
2007 12th	The Two-Minute Rule (2006)	Robert Crais	Christopher Graybill		Finalist	
2007 12th	Water for Elephants (2006)	Sara Gruen	David LeDoux and John Randolph-Jones		Finalist	
2008 13th	Tallgrass (2008)	Sandra Dallas	Lorelei King		Winner	
2008 13th	Exile (2007)	Richard North Patterson	Dennis Boutsikaris		Finalist	
2008 13th	The Friday Night Knitting Club (2006)	Kate Jacobs(writer)	Carrington MacDuffie		Finalist	
2008 13th	The Tenderness of Wolves (2006)	Stef Penney	Sally Armstrong and Adam Sims		Finalist	
2008 13th	The Vanishing Act of Esme Lennox (2007)	Maggie O'Farrell	Anne Flosnick		Finalist	
2009 14th	Duma Key (2008)	Stephen King	John Slattery		Winner	
2009 14th	The Guernsey Literary and Potato Peel Pie Society (2008)	Mary Ann Shaffer	Paul Boehmer, Susan Duerdan, and full cast		Winner	
2009 14th	Change of Heart (2008)	Jodi Picoult	Danielle Ferland, Jim Frangione, Jenny Ikeda, Stafford Clarke-Price, and Nicole Poole		Finalist	
2009 14th	A Prisoner of Birth (2008)	Jeffrey Archer	Roger Allam		Finalist	
2009 14th	The Lace Reader (2006)	Brunonia Barry	Alyssa Bresnahan		Finalist	

=== 2010s ===
Award Year	Audiobook	Author(s)	Narrator(s)	Publisher	Result	Ref.
2010 15th	The Help (2009)	Kathryn Stockett	Cassandra Campbell, Jenna Lamia, Octavia Spencer, and Bahni Turpin	Penguin Audiobooks	Winner	
2010 15th	The Bonfire of the Vanities (1987)	Tom Wolfe	Joe Barrett	Blackstone Audio	Finalist	
2010 15th	Face of Betrayal (2009)	Lis Wiehl and April Henry	Pam Turlow	Oasis Audio	Finalist	
2010 15th	The Pigman (1968)	Paul Zindel	Eden Riegel and Charlie McWade	Graymalkin Media	Finalist	
2010 15th	Slumdog Millionaire (2005)	Vikas Swarup	Christopher Simpson	BBC Audiobooks America	Finalist	
2011 16th	Winter's Bone (2006)	Daniel Woodrell	Emma Galvin	Hachette Audio	Winner	
2011 16th	Pride and Prejudice and Zombies (2009)	Seth Grahame-Smith	Katherine Kellgren	Audible	Finalist	
2011 16th	The Postmistress (2010)	Sarah Blake	Orlagh Cassidy	Blackstone Audio	Finalist	
2011 16th	Fall of Giants (2010)	Ken Follett	John Lee	Penguin Audio	Finalist	
2011 16th	The Lonely Polygamist (2010)	Brady Udall	David Aaron Baker	Recorded Books	Finalist	
2011 16th	Every Last One (2010)	Anna Quindlen	Hope Davis	Simon & Schuster Audio	Finalist	
2012 17th	Alas, Babylon (1959	Pat Frank	Will Patton	Audible	Winner	
2012 17th	American Gods (2001)	Neil Gaiman	Dennis Boutsikaris and full cast	HarperAudio	Finalist	
2012 17th	Heat Rises (2011)	Richard Castle	Johnny Heller	Hyperion Audio	Finalist	
2012 17th	Portrait of a Spy (2011)	Daniel Silva	Simon Vance	HarperAudio/Recorded Books	Finalist	
2012 17th	The Winds of War (1971)	Herman Wouk	Kevin Pariseau	Audible	Finalist	
2013 18th	The Handmaid's Tale (1985)	Margaret Atwood	Claire Danes	Audible	Winner	
2013 18th	The Bartender's Tale (2012)	Ivan Doig	David Aaron Baker	Recorded Books	Finalist	
2013 18th	Beautiful Ruins (2012)	Jess Walter	Edoardo Ballerini	HarperAudio	Finalist	
2013 18th	A Rage in Harlem (1985)	Chester Himes	Samuel L. Jackson	Audible	Finalist	
2013 18th	Speaks the Nightbird (2002)	Robert R. McCammon	Edoardo Ballerini	Audible	Finalist	
2014 19th	Doctor Sleep (2013)	Stephen King	Will Patton	Simon & Schuster Audio	Winner	
2014 19th	The Golem and the Jinni (2013)	Helene Wecker	George Guidall	HarperAudio	Finalist	
2014 19th	The Good House (2013)	Ann Leary	Mary Beth Hurt	Macmillan Audio	Finalist	
2014 19th	The Imposter Bride (2012)	Nancy Richler	Tavia Gilbert	Tantor Audio	Finalist	
2014 19th	Jacob's Oath (2013)	Martin Fletcher	George Guidall	Macmillan Audio	Finalist	
2014 19th	The Ocean at the End of the Lane (2012)	Neil Gaiman	Neil Gaiman	HarperAudio	Finalist	
2015 20th	All the Light We Cannot See (2014)	Anthony Doerr	Zach Appelman	Simon & Schuster Audio	Winner	
2015 20th	Five and Twenty-Fives (2014)	Michael Pitre	Kevin T. Collins, Nick Sullivan, Jay Snyder, Fajer Al-Kaisi, and Michael Pitre	Audible	Finalist	
2015 20th	The Invention of Wings (2014)	Sue Monk Kidd	Sue Monk Kidd, Jenna Lamia, and Adepero Oduye	Penguin Random House Audio	Finalist	
2015 20th	Mr. Mercedes (2014)	Stephen King	Will Patton	Simon & Schuster Audio	Finalist	
2015 20th	Us (2014)	David Nicholls	David Haig	HarperAudio	Finalist	
2015 20th	Written in My Own Heart's Blood (2014)	Diana Gabaldon	Davina Porter	Recorded Books	Finalist	
2016 21st	The Nightingale (2015)	Kristin Hannah	Polly Stone	Macmillan Audio	Winner	
2016 21st	Citizens Creek (2015)	Lalita Tademy	Bahni Turpin and J. D. Jackson	Brilliance Audio	Finalist	
2016 21st	A God in Ruins (2015)	Kate Atkinson	Alex Jennings	Hachette Audio	Finalist	
2016 21st	Kitchens of the Great Midwest (2015)	J. Ryan Stradal	Amy Ryan and Michael Stuhlbarg	Books on Tape/Penguin Random House Audio	Finalist	
2016 21st	The Last Bus to Wisdom (2015)	Ivan Doig	David Baker	Recorded Books	Finalist	
2016 21st	The Sellout (2015)	Paul Beatty	Prentice Onayemi	Audible	Finalist	
2017 22nd	Sister of Mine (2016)	Sabra Waldfogel	Bahni Turpin	Brilliance Audio	Winner	
2017 22nd	America's First Daughter (2016)	Stephanie Dray and Laura Kamoie	Cassandra Campbell	HarperAudio	Finalist	
2017 22nd	Belgravia (2016)	Julian Fellowes	Juliet Stevenson	Hachette Audio	Finalist	
2017 22nd	Darktown (2016)	Thomas Mullen	Andre Holland	Simon & Schuster Audio	Finalist	
2017 22nd	End of Watch (2016)	Stephen King	Will Patton	Simon & Schuster Audio	Finalist	
2018 23rd	Eleanor Oliphant Is Completely Fine (2017)	Gail Honeyman	Cathleen McCarron	Penguin Audio	Winner	
2018 23rd	An Almond for a Parrot (2016)	Wray Delaney	Rachel Atkins	Harlequin Audio	Finalist	
2018 23rd	Beartown (2016)	Fredrik Backman with Neil Smith (trans.)	Marin Ireland	Simon & Schuster Audio	Finalist	
2018 23rd	I Liked My Life (2017)	Abby Fabiaschi	Susan Bennett, Dan Bittner, and Thérèse Plummer	Macmillan Audio	Finalist	
2018 23rd	The Life and Times of Persimmon Wilson (2013)	Nancy Peacock	JD Jackson	HighBridge Audio	Finalist	
2018 23rd	The Tea Girl of Hummingbird Lane (2017)	Lisa See	Ruthie Ann Miles, Kimiko Glenn, et al.	Simon & Schuster Audio	Finalist	
2019 24th	The Tattooist of Auschwitz (2018)	Heather Morris	Richard Armitage	HarperAudio	Winner	
2019 24th	An Absolutely Remarkable Thing (2018)	Hank Green	Kristen Sieh and Hank Green	Penguin Random House Audio	Finalist	
2019 24th	The Clockmaker's Daughter (2018)	Kate Morton	Joanne Froggatt	Bolinda Audio	Finalist	
2019 24th	The Great Alone (2018)	Kristin Hannah	Julia Whelan	Macmillan Audio	Finalist	
2019 24th	Life of Pi (2001)	Yann Martel	Vikas Adam	Audible	Finalist	
2019 24th	Sanctuary (2017)	Judy Nunn	John Derum		Finalist	

=== 2020s ===
Award Year	Audiobook	Author(s)	Narrator(s)	Publisher	Result	Ref.
2020 25th	City of Girls (2019)	Elizabeth Gilbert	Blair Brown	Penguin Random House Audio	Winner	
2020 25th	The Age of Light (2019)	Whitney Scharer	Thérèse Plummer	Hachette Audio	Finalist	
2020 25th	Cilka's Journey (2019)	Heather Morris	Louise Brealey	Macmillan Audio	Finalist	
2020 25th	Colombiano (2017)	Rusty Young	Rusty Young and Brian J. Ramos	Bolinda Audio	Finalist	
2020 25th	The House We Grew Up In (2013)	Lisa Jewell	Karina Fernandez	Dreamscape	Finalist	
2021 26th	Such a Fun Age (2019)	Kiley Reid	Nicole Lewis	Penguin Random House Audio	Winner	
2021 26th	Big Lies in a Small Town (2020)	Diane Chamberlain	Susan Bennett	Macmillan Audio	Finalist	
2021 26th	The Last Story of Mina Lee (2020)	Nancy Jooyoun Kim	Greta Jung	HarperAudio	Finalist	
2021 26th	The Midnight Library (2020)	Matt Haig	Carey Mulligan	Canongate Books UK/Penguin Random House Audio US	Finalist	
2021 26th	Sex and Vanity (2020)	Kevin Kwan	Lydia Look	Penguin Random House Audio	Finalist	
2022 27th	The Final Revival of Opal & Nev (2021)	Dawnie Walton	Janina Edwards, Bahni Turpin, James Langton, Gabra Zackman, Dennis Boutsikaris, Steve West, André De Shields, Matthew Lloyd Davies, David Sadzin, Fiona Hardingham, George Newbern, Leon Nixon, Ines del Castillo, Jackie Sanders, Pete Simonelli, Priya Ayyar, and Robin Miles	Simon & Schuster Audio	Winner	
2022 27th	All the Lonely People (2020)	Mike Gayle	Ben Onwukwe	Hachette Audio	Finalist	
2022 27th	The Four Winds	Kristin Hannah	Julia Whelan	Macmillan Audio	Finalist	
2022 27th	The Lincoln Highway (2021)	Amor Towles	Edoardo Ballerini, Marin Ireland, and Dion Graham	Penguin Random House Audio	Finalist	
2022 27th	The Nature of Fragile Things	Susan Meissner	Alana Kerr Collins and Jason Culp	Penguin Random House Audio	Finalist	
2023 27th	Mad Honey	Jodi Picoult and Jennifer Finney Boylan	Carrie Coon, Key Taw, Jodi Picoult, and Jennifer Finney Boylan	Penguin Random House Audio	Winner	
2023 27th	Across a Hundred Mountains	Reyna Grande	Marisa Blake and Cynthia Farrell	Simon & Schuster Audio	Finalist	
2023 27th	The Bright Side of Running Club	Josie Lloyd	Danielle Cohen	Dreamscape Media	Finalist	
2023 27th	A House Full of Windsor	Kristin Contino	Barrie Kreinik	Wyatt-MacKenzie & Blackstone Audio	Finalist	
2023 27th	Less is Lost (2017)	Andrew Sean Greer	Robert Petkoff	Hachette Audio	Finalist	
2023 27th	Tracy Flick Can't Win (2022)	Tom Perrotta	Lucy Liu, Dennis Boutsikaris, Jeremy Bobb, Ramona Young, Ali Andre Ali, and Pete Simonelli, with a full cast	Simon & Schuster Audio	Finalist	
2024 29th	Tom Lake (2023)	Ann Patchett	Meryl Streep	HarperAudio	Winner	
2024 29th	Birnam Wood (2023)	Eleanor Catton	Saskia Maarleveld	Audible Studios	Finalist	
2024 29th	Maame	Jessica George	Heather Agyepong	Macmillan Audio	Finalist	
2024 29th	One Blood	Denene Millner	Bahni Turpin, Joniece Abbott-Pratt, and Tina Lifford	Macmillan Audio	Finalist	
2024 29th	Yellowface (2023)	R. F. Kuang	Helen Laser	HarperAudio	Finalist	
2025 30th	Rednecks	Taylor Brown	Ramiz Monsef	Recorded Books	Winner	
2025 30th	The Evolution of Annabel Craig	Lisa Grunwald	Erin Bennett	Penguin Random House Audio	Finalist	
2025 30th	Hamlet's Children	Richard Kluger	Paul Woodson	Tantor Audio	Finalist	
2025 30th	The Ministry of Time: A Novel	Kaliane Bradley	George Weightman and Katie Leung	Simon & Schuster Audio	Finalist	
2025 30th	The Women (2024)	Kristin Hannah	Julia Whelan	Macmillan Audio	Finalist	
2026 31st	Atmosphere (2025)	Taylor Jenkins Reid	Kristen DiMercurio, Julia Whelan, and Taylor Jenkins Reid	Penguin Random House Audio	Winner	
2026 31st	Broken Country	Clare Leslie Hall	Hattie Morahan	Simon & Schuster Audio	Finalist	
2026 31st	The Correspondent	Virginia Evans	Maggi-Meg Reed, Jane Oppenheimer, Carly Robins, Jeff Ebner, David Pittu, Chris Andrew Ciulla, Mark Bramhall, Petrea Burchard, Robert Petkoff, Kimberly Farr, Jim Seybert, Cerris Morgan-Moyer, Jade Wheeler, Peter Ganim, and Steve West	Penguin Random House Audio	Finalist	
2026 31st	The Favorites	Layne Fargo	Christine Lakin, Louisa Zhu, Amy Landon, Elena Rey, Valerie Rose Lohman, Suzanne Toren, Graham Halstead, Julia Emelin, Layne Fargo, Eric Yang, Johnny Weir, and Brandon Perea	Penguin Random House Audio	Finalist	
2026 31st	Junie	Erin Crosby Eckstine	Angel Pean	Penguin Random House Audio	Finalist	
