= Wendy Heard =

American novelist

- Website: www.wendyheard.com

Wendy Heard is an American novelist. She is the author of several books, including thrillers for both young adults and adult readers.

== Career ==
After releasing two thrillers for adult readers, Hunting Annabelle and The Kill Club, Heard released her young adult debut, She's Too Pretty to Burn, in 2021. The book was inspired by The Picture of Dorian Gray. Her next three novels, Dead End Girls, We'll Never Tell, and Such A Lucky Girl, were also YA titles. Her next adult novel, an upmarket, suspenseful reincarnation mystery, was titled How the Story Always Ends.

Heard holds a Bachelor's degree in Studio Art and a Master's degree in Education. She queried four novels before finding her literary agent, Lauren Spieller. She served as a mentor for Pitch Wars, a writing contest that paired aspiring novelists with industry professionals for developmental edits, where she selected Wanda Morris's All Her Little Secrets. After Pitch Wars, the book sold to William Morrow for publication in 2021.

Heard wrote in secret for most of her life before being published. She hosts online classes for aspiring writers and provides editorial services on a freelance basis. Heard co-hosted the Unlikeable Female Characters podcast with authors Layne Fargo and Kristen LePionka.

== Personal life ==
Heard is from California. Growing up, her father lived in San Francisco; she lived in Los Angeles with her mother, as well as San Diego, briefly. She has spent most of her life in Los Angeles. She has tattoos commemorating her first three published novels. Heard openly identifies as bisexual.

== Books ==
- Hunting Annabelle (Harlequin MIRA, 2018)
- The Kill Club (Harlequin MIRA, 2020)
- She’s Too Pretty to Burn (Henry Holt and Company, 2021)
- Dead End Girls (Christy Ottaviano Books, 2022)
- We'll Never Tell (Christy Ottaviano Books, 2023)
- You Can Trust Me (Bantam, Penguin Random House, 2023)
- Such A Lucky Girl (Christy Ottaviano Books, 2026)
- How The Story Always Ends (Bantam, Penguin Random House, 2027)
