= They Never Learn =

They Never Learn may refer to:

- They Never Learn (film)
- They Never Learn (novel)
