= Marching Powder =

Marching Powder may refer to:

- Bolivian marching powder or Peruvian marching powder, euphemisms for cocaine
- Marching Powder (book), a 2003 book by Rusty Young based on the experiences of convicted drug-trafficker Thomas McFadden
- Marching Powder (film), a 2025 British film starring Danny Dyer, unrelated to the book
- "Marching Powder", a track on Tommy Bolin's 1975 album Teaser
