= The Nightingale (2027 film) =

Upcoming film by Michael Morris

- Directed by: Michael Morris
- Screenplay by: Dana Stevens; Ann Peacock
- Based on: The Nightingale by Kristin Hannah
- Produced by: Dakota Fanning; Elle Fanning; Brittany Kahan Ward; Reese Witherspoon; Lauren Neustadter; Elizabeth Cantillon
- Starring: Elle Fanning; Dakota Fanning; Edmund Donovan; Albrecht Schuch; Shira Haas; Mark Rylance
- Cinematography: Chung Chung-hoon
- Edited by: Myron Kerstein
- Production companies: TriStar Pictures; The Cantillon Company; Lewellen Pictures; Hello Sunshine
- Distributed by: Sony Pictures Releasing
- Release date: March 19, 2027
- Country: United States
- Language: English

The Nightingale is an upcoming American historical drama film directed by Michael Morris and written by Dana Stevens and Ann Peacock, based on the 2015 novel by Kristin Hannah. It's produced by and stars sisters Elle and Dakota Fanning in the lead roles, with Edmund Donovan, Albrecht Schuch, Shira Haas, and Mark Rylance in supporting roles.

The Nightingale is scheduled to be released in the United States by Sony Pictures Releasing on March 19, 2027.

== Cast ==
- Elle Fanning as Isabelle Rossignol
- Dakota Fanning as Vianne Mauriac
- Edmund Donovan
- Albrecht Schuch
- Shira Haas as Rachel de Champlain
- Mark Rylance as Julien Rossignol
- Douglas Hodge
- Gwilym Lee
- Vinette Robinson

== Production ==
In March 2015, TriStar Pictures acquired Kristin Hannah's book The Nightingale and hired Ann Peacock to write the script and Elizabeth Cantillon to produce. On August 11, 2016, TriStar hired Michelle MacLaren to direct and re-write with John Sayles, until MacLaren left before production shutdown.

In December 2019, Mélanie Laurent signed on to direct from a script by Dana Stevens with Cantillon still attached to produce. Dakota Fanning and Elle Fanning were set to co-star as the sisters. Filming was due to begin in 2020, but the project was put on hold due to production complications from the COVID-19 pandemic with Laurent ultimately making a smaller, more contained film The Mad Women's Ball instead, intending to return to The Nightingale as her next film. In September 2021, Laurent commented on the film's status and the delayed production, "It's super hard for us to find another date and to make everybody on board at the same time, so it's a mess."

In 2023, Elle expressed hope that the project would come to fruition. In July 2025, it was announced that development on the film had been revived, with Michael Morris now directing the film and the Fanning sisters now also set to produce. Nicole Brown and Shary Shirazi executive produce through TriStar Pictures.

In January 2026, Edmund Donovan joined the cast. In February 2026, Shira Haas and Mark Rylance joined the cast. Albrecht Schuch, Douglas Hodge, Gwilym Lee and Vinette Robinson have supporting roles.

=== Filming ===
Principal photography began on March 29, 2026, in Budapest.

== Release ==
The Nightingale is scheduled to be released in the United States on March 19, 2027. It was originally scheduled to be released on February 12, 2027.

The film, when Laurent was still attached as director, was first set to be released on August 10, 2018; then was pushed to December 25, 2020; then December 22, 2021; and lastly December 23, 2022, before Laurent exited the project.
