= Cathleen McCarron =

Scottish stage, screen and audiobook actor

- Born: Edinburgh
- Education: Royal Conservatoire of Scotland
- Occupations: Actor of Stage, Screen and Audiobook
- Notable work: Eleanor Oliphant Is Completely Fine

Cathleen McCarron is a Scottish film, television, theatre and audiobook actor and professional voice coach.

== Career ==
Cathleen McCarron has appeared in a number of films, including Made of Honor; and had a recurring part as Molly Anderson in the television series The Bill.

She is particularly known for her audiobook acting, and has been described as "one of Audible's highest-rated narrators". She is widely known for her narration of Gail Honeyman's Eleanor Oliphant Is Completely Fine, which is one of the best selling audiobooks of all time. She is included in The Times' "Isolation Special: The Best Audiobooks" and "31 Unmissable Audiobooks Narrated by Your Favourite Celebrities" in Stylist magazine.

McCarron is known for her clarity, range of accents and ability to portray a range of characters in a single book. As Fionnuala Barrett, senior audio editor at HarperCollins explained in Bookseller Stories Behind the Books of the Year

The story [of Eleanor Oliphant] is told in the first person by Eleanor. She is tremendously particular when it comes to her use of language, and so I knew we required a reader with great precision to reflect that. At the same time, the narrator had to be versatile to do justice to the wide cast of characters in the story. Cathleen, with her training as an accent and vocal coach, fit the bill perfectly, and with her background as an actor she was able to balance the humour and the darkness of the story beautifully.

McCarron's work on Eleanor Oliphant established her as a narrator who can attract an audience. Barrett comments that "There are definitely [audio narrators] with a following", citing McCarron as an example.

== Personal life ==
McCarron was born in Edinburgh and now lives in Stratford-upon-Avon.

== Awards ==
- AudioFile Earphones Award Winner, Contemporary Culture, Surfacing by Kathleen Jamie (2019)
- AudioFile Earphones Award Winner, Mystery & Suspense, Broken Ground, Karen Pirie, Book 5 by Val McDermid (2018)
- Audie Award Winner, Fiction, Eleanor Oliphant Is Completely Fine by Gail Honeyman (2018)
- British Book Award Nominee for Best Audiobook, Eleanor Oliphant Is Completely Fine by Gail Honeyman (2018)
- AudioFile Earphones Award Winner, Fiction, Eleanor Oliphant Is Completely Fine by Gail Honeyman (2017)
- Audible Best of the Year, runner up, Fiction, Eleanor Oliphant Is Completely Fine by Gail Honeyman (2017)
- AudioFile Earphones Award Winner, Mystery & Suspense, Standing Still, Anderson and Costello, Book 8 by Caro Ramsay (2017)

== Narrator work ==
- Trumpet by Jackie Kay
- The Red Road, Alex Morrow, Book 4 by Denise Mina
- Blood Salt Water, Alex Morrow, Book 5 by Denise Mina
- Eleanor Oliphant Is Completely Fine by Gail Honeyman
- Under a Pole Star by Stef Penney
- Standing Still, Anderson and Costello, Book 8 by Caro Ramsay
- Broken Ground, Karen Pirie, Book 5 by Val McDermid
- Still Life by Val McDermid
- Conviction by Denise Mina
- The Curious Heart of Ailsa Rae by Stephanie Butland
- Surfacing by Kathleen Jamie
- Watch Him Die by Craig Robertson

== Film work ==
Made of Honor

Hidden

== TV work ==
- Witchcraze
- The Bill (recurring role)
- Doctors
