= Firefly Lane =

2021 American drama television series

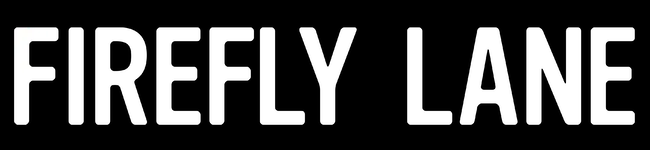
- Genre: Drama
- Created by: Maggie Friedman
- Based on: Firefly Lane by Kristin Hannah
- Showrunner: Maggie Friedman
- Starring: Katherine Heigl; Sarah Chalke; Ben Lawson; Beau Garrett; Ali Skovbye; Roan Curtis; Yael Yurman; Ignacio Serricchio
- Music by: Wendy Melvoin & Lisa Coleman
- Country of origin: United States
- Original language: English
- No. of seasons: 2
- No. of episodes: 26

Production
- Executive producers: Peter O'Fallon; Stephanie Germain; Katherine Heigl; Shawn Williamson; Lee Rose; Maggie Friedman; Michael Spiller
- Producers: Aaron Au; Arielle Boisvert
- Production location: Burnaby, British Columbia
- Cinematography: Vincent De Paula
- Editors: Jamin Bricker; Lisa Binkley; Alison Grace; Lisa Robison
- Running time: 44–70 minutes
- Production companies: Stephanie Germain Productions; Curly Girly Productions

Original release
- Network: Netflix
- Release: February 3, 2021 – April 27, 2023

Firefly Lane is an American drama television series created by Maggie Friedman for Netflix. The series is based on the novel of the same name by Kristin Hannah. The series premiered on February 3, 2021, and navigates the lives of two teenage girls in the 1970s, all the way through to their adulthood in the mid-2000s. In May 2021, the series was renewed for a second season. In October 2022, it was announced that the second season would be its final season and would consist of 16 episodes, split into two parts. The first part of the second season was released on December 2, 2022, and the second part was released on April 27, 2023.

== Premise ==
Firefly Lane follows the friendship and bond between two women from the Seattle area, Kate Mularkey and Tallulah "Tully" Hart, from when they become neighbors at age 14 on a street named Firefly Lane, through the decades until their 40s, through the ups and downs of their lives.

== Cast and characters ==
=== Main ===
- Katherine Heigl as Tully Hart, host of the daytime talk show The Girlfriend Hour
  - Ali Skovbye as teenage Tully
  - London Robertson as young Tully 1970
- Sarah Chalke as Kate Mularkey, Tully's best friend since they were 14 years old and a housewife who is trying to get back in the workforce while going through a divorce
  - Roan Curtis as teenage Kate
- Ben Lawson as Johnny Ryan, Kate's ex-husband and the producer of The Girlfriend Hour
- Beau Garrett as Cloud, Tully's free-spirited, drug-addicted mother
- Yael Yurman as Marah Ryan, Kate and Johnny's teenage daughter
- Ignacio Serricchio as Danny Diaz (season 2)

=== Recurring ===
- Brandon Jay McLaren as Travis, a widower whose daughter goes to the same school as Marah and finds a connection with Kate
- Jon Ecker as Max Brody, Tully's love interest (season 1)
- Chelah Horsdal as Margie, Kate's mother
- Paul McGillion as Bud, Kate's father
- Jenna Rosenow as Kimber Watts, an editor at Seattle Digest and Kate's boss
- Leo Rano as Leon, Cloud's boyfriend in the 1970s
- Brendan Taylor as Mutt, the cameraman at local news station KPOC Tacoma and Kate's love interest in the 1980s
- Jason Mckinnon as Sean, Kate's closeted older brother
  - Quinn Lord as Sean '74
- Synto Misati as Robbie '74
- Kirsten Robek as Carol, a KPOC Tacoma anchor
- Andres Joseph as Gideon Vega, a photographer at Seattle Digest
- Patrick Sabongui as Chad Wiley, Tully's love interest in the 1980s who was also her college professor
- Tara Wilson as Julia, Sean's wife
- Kyra Leroux as Lisa-Karen (season 2)
- Jolene Purdy as Justine Jordan (season 2), Tully's new talent agent
- India de Beaufort as Charlie (season 2)
- Greg Germann as Benedict Binswanger (season 2), a wealthy businessman who is running for governor of the state of Washington whom Tully and Danny are covering for a story. He came from a family who owned a logging company known as Bincorp.
- Forrest Anthony as Parker Binswanger, (credited ambiguously as "Teenage Boy" in season 1) Benedict's kinder, more sensitive brother.
- Oliver Rice as Theo (season 2)
- Seth Isaac Johnson as Eugene (season 2)
- Chris McNally as Mr. Waverly (season 2)
- Khobe Clarke as Coop (season 2)

=== Special guest star ===
- Martin Donovan as Wilson King, a famous TV producer

== Episodes ==
=== Series overview ===
Season	Episodes		Originally released
1	10		February 3, 2021
2	16	9	December 2, 2022
2	16	7	April 27, 2023

=== Season 1 (2021) ===
No. overall	No. in season	Title	Directed by	Written by	Original release date
1	1	"Hello, Yellow Brick Road"	Peter O'Fallon	Teleplay by : Maggie Friedman	February 3, 2021
2	2	"Oh! Sweet Something"	Peter O'Fallon	Maggie Friedman	February 3, 2021
3	3	"Dancing Queens"	Anne Wheeler	Ilene Rosenzweig	February 3, 2021
4	4	"Love is a Battlefield"	Anne Wheeler	Savannah Dooley	February 3, 2021
5	5	"Sweet Child O' Mine"	Vanessa Parise	Maggie Friedman & Barbara Johns	February 3, 2021
6	6	"Dirty Laundry"	Vanessa Parise	John Sacret Young	February 3, 2021
7	7	"Total Eclipse of the Hart"	Fred Gerber	Marissa Lee	February 3, 2021
8	8	"Mawaige"	Fred Gerber	Savannah Dooley & James Ford Jr.	February 3, 2021
9	9	"You Say It's Your Birthday?!"	Lee Rose	Ilene Rosenzweig	February 3, 2021
10	10	"Auld Lang Syne"	Lee Rose	Maggie Friedman	February 3, 2021

=== Season 2 (2022–23) ===
No. overall	No. in season	Title	Directed by	Written by	Original release date
Part 1
11	1	"Wish You Were Here"	Michael Spiller	Maggie Friedman	December 2, 2022
12	2	"On the Road"	Michael Spiller	Savannah Dooley & Marissa Lee & Barbara Johns	December 2, 2022
13	3	"I'm Coming Out"	Shannon Kohli	Becky Hartman Edwards & Michael V. Ross	December 2, 2022
14	4	"Papa Don't Preach"	Shannon Kohli	Davah Avena & James Ford, Jr.	December 2, 2022
15	5	"Simple Twist of Fate"	Vanessa Parise	Savannah Dooley & Marissa Lee	December 2, 2022
16	6	"Reborn on the Fourth of July"	Vanessa Parise	Maggie Friedman & Barbara Johns	December 2, 2022
17	7	"Good Riddance/Time of Your Life"	Katina Medina Mora	Becky Hartman Edwards & Michael V. Ross	December 2, 2022
18	8	"All Apologies"	Katina Medina Mora	Maggie Friedman & Davah Avena	December 2, 2022
19	9	"Hart-Shaped Box"	Michael Spiller	Maggie Friedman & James Ford, Jr.	December 2, 2022
Part 2
20	10	"All the World's a Stage"	Monika Mitchell	Savannah Dooley	April 27, 2023
21	11	"The Breast Is Yet to Come"	Monika Mitchell	Barbara Johns	April 27, 2023
22	12	"Time After Time"	Sarah Wayne Callies	Marissa Lee	April 27, 2023
23	13	"Can't Fight This Feeling"	Sarah Wayne Callies	Davah Avena & Michael V. Ross	April 27, 2023
24	14	"I Can't Go On, I'll Go On"	Winnifred Jong	Maggie Friedman & James Ford, Jr.	April 27, 2023
25	15	"Moondance"	Winnifred Jong	Becky Hartman Edwards & Emily E. Ellis	April 27, 2023
26	16	"This Must Be the Place"	Michael Spiller	Maggie Friedman	April 27, 2023

== Production ==
=== Development ===
On February 22, 2019, it was announced that Netflix had given the production a series order for a first season consisting of ten episodes. The series was created and showran by Maggie Friedman who was also expected to executive produce alongside Stephanie Germain, Katherine Heigl, and Lee Rose. On May 26, 2021, Netflix renewed the series for a second season. On October 3, 2022, it was reported that the second season would be its final season which would consist of 16 episodes, splitting into two parts.

=== Casting ===
On July 10, 2019, Katherine Heigl was cast in a lead role. In August 2019, Ben Lawson, Sarah Chalke, Beau Garrett had been cast in starring roles. In September 2019, Ali Skovbye and Roan Curtis were cast to play the teenage versions of Heigl's and Chalke's characters, Tully and Kate, respectively. In the same month, Yael Yurman was cast as a series regular while Jon Ecker and Brandon Jay McLaren were cast in recurring capacities. On December 17, 2019, Patrick Sabongui and Brendan Taylor joined the cast in recurring roles. On February 11, 2020, Jenna Rosenow was cast in a recurring role. On September 21, 2021, Ignacio Serricchio joined the cast as new series regular while Greg Germann, India de Beaufort, and Jolene Purdy were cast in recurring roles for the second season. On February 11, 2022, Chris McNally was cast in a recurring capacity for the second season.

=== Filming ===
Principal photography for the first season began on September 17, 2019, and ended on January 21, 2020, in Burnaby, British Columbia. Vincent De Paula is the cinematographer for the series. Filming for the second season began on August 30, 2021, and concluded on April 28, 2022.

== Release ==
On October 14, 2020, an official teaser was released as well as first look images. The series premiered on February 3, 2021. The first nine episodes of second season were released on December 2, 2022, and the final seven were released on April 27, 2023.

== Reception ==
=== Audience viewership ===
For the week of February 1 to 7, Firefly Lane was ranked number one in the Nielsen ratings, who announced that the show had been viewed for a total of 1.3 billion minutes. The following week, it was ranked number one in the Nielsen ratings again, with a total of 1.288 billion minutes of viewing. On April 20, 2021, Netflix announced that 49 million people watched the series in its first 28 days after its release.

=== Critical response ===
For the first season, review aggregator Rotten Tomatoes reported an approval rating of 48% based on 31 critic reviews, with an average rating of 5.7/10. The website's critics consensus reads, "Firefly Lane has some solid ideas and a winning pair in Katherine Heigl and Sarah Chalke—if only the writing could live up to all that potential." Metacritic gave the first season a weighted average score of 57 out of 100 based on 21 critic reviews, indicating "mixed or average reviews".

Judy Berman of Time wrote, "By most metrics, Firefly Lane is simply not a good show. Yet despite its many limitations, there's something lovable about it." Joel Keller of Decider said, "The chemistry between Sarah Chalke and Katherine Heigl will carry Firefly Lane."

On Rotten Tomatoes, the second season has an 83% approval rating based on 6 critic reviews, with an average rating of 5.9/10.
