= We'll Never Tell =

Novel by Wendy Heard

- Cover of the first edition
- Author: Wendy Heard
- Cover artist: Tracy Shaw
- Language: English
- Genre: Young adult Mystery
- Publisher: Christy Ottaviano Books
- Publication date: May 16, 2023
- Publication place: United States
- ISBN: 978-0-316-48233-2

We'll Never Tell is a young adult mystery novel by Wendy Heard, published by Hachette Book Group in 2020. It follows the story of a group of friends who break into an abandoned mansion in Los Angeles to film a video for their anonymous YouTube channel.

The book is set in the protagonists' senior year of high school, and narrates the events after one of them is fatally stabbed mid-exploration. It touches upon themes such as the sensationalization of violent crime, and how the glamor of the acting industry conceals dark realities.

The narration uses multiple perspectives that switch between the past and the present. It contains multimedia sections, with fictional excerpts from newspapers and magazine clippings. Heard has stated that she drew inspiration from the real life case of the 'Loz Feliz Murder House', which is famous for an alleged murder-suicide in 1959.

== Characters ==
- Casey Costello: the primary narrator and a high school senior. She is part of the anonymous YouTube channel, where she researches locations and their history. She lives with her grandmother, and initially plans to go to community college in order to work part-time and support their household.
- Jacob "Jake" Arsenault: the secondary narrator and voiceover artist for the YouTube channel, who gets stabbed during their final exploration. He plans to become a PA after high school, and is in a secret relationship with Eddie, his childhood friend, for most of the narrative.
- Zoe Wilkins: Casey's best friend and a future computer science student at Massachusetts Institute of Technology. She comes from a wealthy family and handles most of the technical details of the YouTube channel.
- Edward "Eddie" Yu: a high school senior and the fourth member of the anonymous YouTube channel. He is responsible for the video coverage of their explorations, and plans to attend the University of Southern California as a film student. He is gay and in a secret relationship with Jacob, whom he has known since their childhood.

== Reception ==
We'll Never Tell received generally positive reviews, with the School Library Journal calling it "a great fast-paced thriller that will keep YA readers guessing". Kirkus Reviews stated that although the plot was predictable to experienced readers, the historical elements and romance added intrigue to the book. Commentators appreciated the deep dives into local history and legends, and how multimedia formats were utilized throughout the narrative.
