= Temper (Fargo novel) =

2019 novel by Layne Fargo

- First edition ebook cover
- Author: Layne Fargo
- Language: English
- Genre: Psychological thriller
- Publisher: Gallery/Scout Press
- Publication date: July 2, 2019
- Publication place: United States
- Pages: 352
- ISBN: 9781982106737

Temper is a psychological thriller novel by American author Layne Fargo. It was published by Gallery/Scout Press on July 2, 2019. The audiobook is narrated by Hillary Huber and Jayme Mattler. It alternates perspective between the characters of Kira and Joanna. It is Fargo's debut novel.

== Background ==
The novel was originally inspired by real events at Chicago's Profiles Theatre. She began the novel in July 2016. A year into writing, she became a Pitch Wars mentee. Her Pitch Wars mentor was the first person besides her to read the novel, as she did not have any beta readers.

== Synopsis ==
In Chicago, Kira Rascher is living with her friend with benefits, Spence, working a day job she hates, and auditioning for theater roles every chance she gets. She longs to star alongside Malcolm "Mal" Mercer, who an actor and the artistic director of the Indifferent Honest Theater Company. When she auditions for a two-person play called Temper, the company's executive director Joanna hates her on sight. Kira gets the role, opposite Mal, and the two have immediate chemistry. But she is not prepared for his coaching techniques, which include inviting her abusive ex-boyfriend to rehearsal to help her tap into her rage. Despite receiving warnings, Kira is convinced that she can handle Mal, but begins to lose control of herself. All the while Joanna becomes increasingly jealous of Kira.

== Reception ==
Kirkus Reviews described Fargo's writing style as "propulsive" and the ending as "effective" but not "shocking". Publishers Weekly described the novel as "page-turning" and called Fargo "a writer to watch". Laura Collin-Hughes of The New York Times called it "enjoyably pulpy". JR Atkinson of Newcity Lit praised the novel for having "vivacious" characters, an "unpredictable" plot, and a climax "worthy of the stage."
