= Trumpet (novel) =

1998 book by Jackie Kay

- Hardback edition
- Author: Jackie Kay
- Audio read by: Cathleen McCarron
- Language: English
- Genre: Novel
- Publisher: Picador (UK)
- Publication date: 1998
- Publication place: United Kingdom
- Media type: Print (Hardback & Paperback)
- Pages: 278 pp
- ISBN: 0-330-33145-0
- OCLC: 40119161

Trumpet is the debut novel from Scottish writer and poet Jackie Kay, published in 1998. It chronicles the life and death of fictional jazz artist Joss Moody through the recollections of his family, friends and those who came in contact with him at his death. Kay stated in an interview that her novel was inspired by the life of Billy Tipton, an American jazz musician who lived secretly as a transgender man in the mid-twentieth century.

== Plot ==
The novel begins just after the main character, Joss Moody, a famous jazz trumpeter, passes away. After his death, it is revealed that his biological sex was female, causing a news rush and attracting paparazzi, leading his widow, Millie, to flee to a vacation home. The truth was unknown to anyone except Millie; the Moodys lived their life as a normal married couple with a normal house and a normal family, and not even Colman, their adopted son, knew the truth. When Joss dies and the truth is revealed, Colman's shock spills into bitterness and he seeks revenge. He vents his rage about his father's lie by uncovering Joss's life to Sophie, an eager tabloid journalist craving to write the next bestseller. After time, and a visit to Joss's mother Edith Moore, Colman eventually finds love for his father muddled together with his rage. With his new-found acceptance of both his father and himself, Colman decides not to follow through with the book deal. All the while, Millie deals with her grief and the scandal in private turmoil at the Moodys' vacation home, and a variety of characters whose paths have crossed with Joss's give accounts of their memories and experiences. Each character aside from Sophie appears to either accept Joss's identity or regard it as irrelevant.

== Setting and narrative voice ==
Trumpet is mostly set in London in 1997. Memories of Joss's life give the book's setting a 70-year span beginning in 1927. Most of these memories are set in Glasgow in the 1960s, referring to locations such as The Barrowlands music venue at the start of Joss and Millie's relationship and their early marriage. Although much of the story takes place in London where the Moodys lived, it jumps back and forth between the city and the Scottish seaside home where Millie goes to escape the scandal and grieve in peace. The novel's end is set entirely in Scotland, where Colman and Sophie go to investigate Joss's birthplace.

Trumpet is written with an intricate narration, incorporating many characters' points of view. The narration varies by chapter. Most of the story is told from the first-person perspective of Joss's wife Millie, his son Colman, and the journalist Sophie Stones. The narration often takes the form of the inner thoughts of these three characters, including visitations of their memories. Some chapters are Colman responding to Sophie Stones' interview. In addition, chapters told from a third-person omniscient narrator contribute to the story, each focusing on a different minor character, such as the funeral director or Joss's drummer.

Jackie Kay's choice to narrate Joss Moody's life through the voice of the people who he encountered/loved/played music with in life and death captures the function and consequences of trans necropolitics.

== Characters ==
- The central character is Joss Moody, a famous Black jazz musician. The novel begins in the wake of his death. Assigned female at birth and named Josephine Moore, Joss is transgender. He becomes a famous trumpet player and devotes his life to his passion of music. Joss is portrayed as a passionate lover, strict father, energetic friend, and dedicated artist.
- Millie Moody, a white woman, is married to Joss. As a young adult, she falls in love with Joss, and her passion is strong enough to overcome the truth about his birth-assigned gender. After his death, Millie is devastated. Although she outwardly handles herself with grace and composure, Millie's heart is broken. Millie is a loving, sympathetic character living out the cycles of grief under an unwanted spotlight.
- Colman Moody is the adopted son of Millie and Joss. He is of mixed race. As a child, Colman was often difficult and misbehaved. Upon his father's death, Colman, aged 30, discovers that his father was assigned female at birth, and experiences a range of emotions including confusion, anger, embarrassment, and grief, which drives him to cooperate with a journalist, Sophie Stones, in her attempt to write Joss Moody's story.
- Edith Moore is Joss Moody's mother. She enters the novel only at the end. She is seen as she grows old in a retirement home, without knowing that Joss had been living as a male.
- Sophie Stones is a journalist who seeks to write a novel about the revelation of Joss Moody's identity, seeing it as a lucrative opportunity for her career. She expresses more overtly prejudiced and transphobic views regarding Joss's identity than others in the novel do.

== Themes ==
=== Identity ===
This element may be divided in three main subcategories: gender identity, cultural identity and racial identity. They are all developed under the main "umbrella term" of identity, but also develop in their own specificity during the narration. It explores dualities such as male/female, Black/white, and famous/non-famous. Joss's experiences are shaped by his transgender identity and his identity as a Black Scottish man. Colman, for his part, not only grapples with his Black and Scottish identities, but also with his complex self-identity due to being adopted. The theme of identity is particularly explored through the novel's focus on names, and the changing of names, as an integral part of one's identity.

- Gender identity: the unravelling of these categories is among the novel's most highlighted themes, meaning that it is the first necessary step to develop and build an identity for many of the characters. As well as Joss, this also applies to other characters such as Millie, who never regards herself as a lesbian since she always sees Joss as a man, whereas society and other characters do not. After what appears to be a fight for the right to not conform to gender-assigned roles, after Joss's death, he is forced back into a categorised role delegated by a binary and heteronormative society.
- Cultural identity: the novel's principal setting is in Scotland in the mid-20th century, with the storyline spanning from 1927 till 1997, a period of significant change. Scotland is presented as a fundamentally traditional, orthodox, conservative country where the question of identity is not even asked. Many references to the patriarchal culture are seen throughout the narration, as well as in the actions of the characters (i.e., improper use of the "she/her" pronouns by the journalist when referring to Joss; Colman's sexual desire in order to maintain, or define, his own masculinity, virility and manhood).
- Race identity: Race is also an important component in the identity of the characters. Joss is a Black man, a son of the Scottish nation, but lives in a country which hardly recognizes his social status as minority. There is a parallel here with author Jackie Kay, who also grew up in Scotland and was Scottish through her mother and Nigerian through her father. Her life and that of one of the main characters (Joss) both are a mixture of backgrounds, and similarities can emerge between the two personalities. Living in Scotland she belonged to a true minority group of British Blacks, since, according to National Statistics publication for Scotland, only 1% of the Scottish population belongs to African, Caribbean or Black ethnic groups.

=== The "manhood" question in Colman ===
Colman is angry at Joss because his father had a female body. In Colman's view, Joss is not following the gender role imposed by the patriarchal society, that he (Colman) conforms to, as seen in the scene where Colman wants to have anal sex with the journalist to impose control on her, as an expression of the culture of possession, a crucial element in a patriarchal system. Colman marginalizes his father despite knowing himself how it feels to be marginalized, especially in a European context where there are significant challenges associated with being Black. Colman feels that his male identity is being questioned after his father's death because he loses a sense of attachment to the safety and assurance from the patriarchal culture and system. In this sense Colman categorizes people in the same way that he is marginalized by others.

=== Sex ===
The novel appears to depict sex in two different ways: the first between Millie and Joss, described in the book's very first pages where it is evident that Joss was assigned a female gender at birth. Millie and Joss enjoy a genuine, lovely, naive relationship. The second depiction is the form of sex used by Colman as a tool of revenge. Colman's relationship with sex appears affected by the trauma of discovering that his father had female genitalia, but may also be linked to the possessive nature of the patriarchal system.

=== Music, role of jazz and the trumpet ===
Jazz music, and music's role in general in Black culture, is a form of expression through which Joss demonstrates his identity through an undeniable ability to play music. Music comes to be a liberating practice. Every individual character seems to be an instrument and a part of a musical narration where the union of the characters becomes an orchestra. Jazz's role in this novel shows a sharp contrast to other dominant themes. Amidst a strong duality of themes (notably male and female, Black and white) jazz on the other hand offers freedom and detachment from social norms and constrictions. Appreciating Joss's ability to find comfort in his music, and of course the symbolism in the trumpet he played (which has a phallic shape) music in this novel plays a vital role in liberating the characters from societal norms. It is a consistent, unchanging theme throughout the novel. Even when Joss's gender is revealed, the love of jazz remains, so much so that his friend and partner Big Red defends him even after his death. Joss builds his public identity through music and with an instrument which, casually or not, may remind him of the organ he does not have. Joss found his masculinity in jazz music, whereas Colman identifies his masculinity in his physique.

=== Transphobia ===
Millie's reaction is private when, in their first intimate encounter, she discovers that Joss has the body of a woman. She gets angry but later does not mind. This is not mentioned again in the book. The only transphobic remarks that appear come from people who were not privately linked to Joss, except for their son. The narrative reveals people's reactions to the discovery after Joss' death, shown through their disorientation, disgust or general transphobic comments. Miss Stones shows this clearly in her refusal to use "he/him" pronouns from the first time she talks about Joss, denying him legitimate recognition of his identity. Transphobia is shown against Joss and to all those he knew as well, starting with the disregard held for his family and friends' opinions of him, making it all the more difficult for him to be defended when he is not there to do it himself.

=== Passing ===
The novel examines a general perception that death is a moment that makes someone more vulnerable and exposed to the critiques from which one cannot defend oneself. Private life becomes public. Joss' identity is discussed and questioned, his body is accurately analyzed, and he cannot defend himself. The only attempt to defend Joss is made by his wife Millie, but at the end the defense appears weak, blurred and almost inconsistent. After his death he is treated as "a Black queer monstrosity that can be met only with derision and turned into spectacle", and the only thing Millie continues to do is refer to him using male pronouns.

=== Family relationships ===
Another theme in the novel is familial relationships, especially that between Joss and Colman. After his father's death, Colman reflects on his childhood and how his relationship with his father has changed over time. There was tension in Joss and Colman's relationship due to the fact that Colman was not as successful as his father. Their relationship is noticeably difficult starting from Colman's adolescence, the time when typical secondary physical characteristics emerge and, in males, the body becomes physically "masculine". This tension increased upon Joss's death and Colman's discovery that his father was a trans man. At a certain point in the book, coinciding with Colman's narration of a conspicuous part of his adolescence, Joss was said to develop a sort of envy for Colman's body, potentially seeing attributes in him that he does not himself possess. However, the narrative is this part is from Colman's point of view. The novel ends with Colman reading a letter Joss left for him, which talks about his own father.

=== Race and gender ===
The novel also explores issues around race and gender. Both Joss and Colman provide insights into the experiences of Black people in Britain and Scotland and the prejudices they experience. For instance, Millie's mother initially objects to their marriage on account of Joss's race. Joss not only had to learn how to navigate the world as a biracial Black person, but also as a transgender man. He had to learn how to pass as a man, and went to great lengths to ensure that no one found out he was trans besides Millie. The novel also explores the fluidity of gender perception, as characters frequently describe Joss's face transforming, becoming more feminine upon learning his identity as transgender, despite their previously perceiving him wholly as male.

=== Public vs. Private ===
The novel explores issues of fame and the invasion of privacy through the media, resulting in private life turning "horribly public". This clash is illustrated through the paparazzi and media who exploit Millie's grief, forcing her to flee from her home. Colman's interviews with Sophie turn private memories public, and the novel's chapters are titled in the style of media headings and newspaper sections, mirroring the invasion of Joss's privacy and identity for public gaze.

== Reception ==
In an interview, Kay spoke about her desire to make her story read like music, specifically echoing the structure of jazz music.

In an article for the Boston Phoenix, David Valdes Greenwood wrote that "in the hands of a less graceful writer, Jackie Kay's Trumpet would have been a polemic about gender with a dollop of race thrown in for good measure. But Kay has taken the most tabloid topic possible and produced something at once more surprising and more subtle: a rumination on the nature of love and the endurance of a family". Time magazine called it a "hypnotic story ... about the walls between what is known and what is secret. Spare, haunting, dreamlike", and the San Francisco Chronicle commented that "Kay's imaginative leaps in story and language will remind some readers of a masterful jazz solo".

Matt Richardson, in examining the novel's transgender subjectivity and use of a Jazz aesthetic, noted that "as a form that encourages the transformation of standard melodies into multiple improvised creations, jazz is useful in expanding our conceptualization of the potential for Black people to recreate ourselves and our gender identities in a diasporic practice".

In his analysis, Richardson also notes the influences of African American culture on other Black populations, notably Black British people. He writes, "Kay is not the first British lesbian of African descent to adopt African American history and cultural aesthetics in her strategic representation of British queerness.” Richardson writes specifically about the Black British filmmaker Inge Blackman's documentary "B.D. Women", which references a Harlem speakeasy during the 1920s and 1930s. The Blues are also a prominent feature in Blackman's documentary. Richardson's analysis notes that both Kay's and Blackman's works were produced in the context of the African diaspora where race, gender, and sexuality inform their works.

Alexander G Weheliye, drawing a connection between Joss and Hortense Spillers's theory of ungendering, writes about the novel in his essay "Black Life/Schwarz-Sein." Writing about the novel he says, "We have to consider the long intertwined histories of genital policing and sexual violence Black folks have been subject to during the Middle Passage and plantation slavery and since."

== Awards and nominations ==
Trumpet was awarded the Guardian Fiction Prize in 1998 and the Authors' Club First Novel Award in 2000, and won in the Transgender category at the 2000 Lambda Literary Awards. It was shortlisted for the International Dublin Literary Award, also in 2000.

== Adaptations ==
Kay served as advisor to Grace Barnes, director of Skeklers Theatre Company, in her stage adaptation of Trumpet. The stage version was performed in the Citizens Theatre in Glasgow in 2005.

== Publication history ==
Copyright 1998 by Jackie Kay, Trumpet was originally published by Picador (Great Britain) in 1998, and Pantheon Books (New York). It was published by Vintage Books, a division of Random House, Inc. (New York), in 2000.

== Bibliography ==
- Trumpet: A Novel. Random House Digital, Inc. 2011. ISBN 978-0-307-56081-0.
