= Junie (novel) =

2025 novel by Erin Crosby Eckstine

- 2025 first edition hardcover
- Author: Erin Crosby Eckstine
- Language: English
- Genre: Historical fantasy; coming-of-age
- Publisher: Ballantine Books
- Publication date: February 4, 2025
- Publication place: United States
- Pages: 368
- ISBN: 9780593725115

Junie is a historical fantasy novel by American author Erin Crosby Eckstine. It was published by Ballantine Books on February 4, 2025. It is Eckstine's debut novel. An audiobook narrated by Angel Pean was released concurrently with the ebook, the hardback, and the large print paperback editions.

== Background ==
The novel was adapted from a family story told to Eckstine by her grandmother, Callie Crosby, about her great-great-great-grandmother, Jane Cotton, who escaped slavery in Alabama before the Civil War and became one of the black founders of Coosada. Her grandmother dreamed of writing a book about her family, but never got around to it due to her life as a military wife, mother and business owner. Eckstine decided to write the novel herself when visiting her grandparents' house in 2018, at the age of 26. Her grandparents died in 2021, before the novel was completed.

== Synopsis ==
In the summer of 1860, sixteen-year-old Junie has spent her life enslaved with her family on Bellereine Plantation in Lowndes County, Alabama as the personal maid to her master's seventeen-year-old daughter, Violet McQueen. She secretly wanders the local woods at night, grieving and wracked with guilt after her older sister Minnie died the previous winter of a fever after rescuing her from a river. When the wealthy cotton merchant Beauregard Taylor arrives from New Orleans, hinting at marriage for Violet, Junie learns that if the marriage goes through she would be forced to accompany Violet and leave her family behind. In her desperation she accidentally awakens Minnie's spirit. Minnie is now caught in the In-Between, a realm which holds the spirits of black people who have left their earthly missions undone. With the help of Caleb, Beauregard's valet, Junie searches for ways to set Minnie free.

== Reception ==
The novel was nominated for a Goodreads Choice Award for Historical Fiction and Debut Novel. The novel was nominated for an Audie Award for Fiction. It was a GMA Book Club pick for February. It was longlisted for a Crook's Corner Book Prize, which honors the "best debut novel set in the American South."

Kirkus Reviews called it "a compelling portrait" of the degradations of slavery, but stated that "anachronistic" and "clunk[y]" language occasionally mar its "lush" prose. Publishers Weekly praised the novel's "complex plot" and "righteous protagonist". Leah Tyler called the novel "enrapturing" in her review for the Atlanta Journal Constitution, saying that Eckstine had "poured a ton of heart into her characters".
