= Kimberly Belle =

American novelist

- Born: 20 February 1968 (age 58)
- Writing career
- Period: 2014–present
- Website: kimberlybellebooks.com

Kimberly Belle (born 20 February 1968) is an international bestselling American novelist best known for her work in the thriller genre.

== Life and career ==
The daughter of a chemist and a speech pathologist, Belle grew up in Kingsport, Tennessee. She earned a BA from Agnes Scott College. Before she turned to writing fiction, Belle worked in marketing and fundraising for Habitat for Humanity, the YWCA, the Annie E. Casey Foundation, and the United Way.

In 2022, Belle established a bimonthly podcast with fellow thriller novelists Heather Gudenkauf and Kaira Rouda called The Killer Author Club.

== Works ==
Belle is best known for her novel The Marriage Lie (Mira, 2017), which was a USA Today, Wall Street Journal, and Globe and Mail bestseller, as well as a number one iTunes UK bestseller and a semifinalist in the 2017 Goodreads Choice Awards for Best Mystery & Thriller and has been translated in a dozen languages. Dear Wife, her fifth novel, was published in June 2019. The Paris Widow, her seventh and latest novel, was released in June 2024.

- The Last Breath, Mira 2014
- The Ones We Trust, Mira 2015
- The Marriage Lie, Mira 2017
- Three Days Missing, Park Row Books 2018.
- Dear Wife, Park Row Books, 2019
- Stranger in the Lake, Park Row Books, 2020
- Young Rich Widows — co-written with Vanessa Lillie, Layne Fargo, and Cate Holahan, 2022

== Personal life ==
Belle and her husband, a Dutch real estate entrepreneur, have two children. She currently divides her time between Atlanta and Amsterdam.
