= Kitchens of the Great Midwest =

2015 novel by J. Ryan Stradal

- Author: J. Ryan Stradal
- Audio read by: Amy Ryan and Michael Stuhlbarg
- Language: English
- Genre: Fiction
- Publisher: Viking Press
- Publication date: July 28, 2015
- Pages: 320
- ISBN: 0-525-42914-X

Kitchens of the Great Midwest is the debut novel of American author and producer J. Ryan Stradal, published in July 2015 by Viking Press. It debuted at No. 19 on The New York Times Best Seller list for August 23, 2015.

== Plot ==
The novel centers around Eva, a culinary prodigy born with a “once-in-a-generation palate” to a chef father and a sommelier mother. Though growing up in poverty and facing numerous challenges, by age 10 Eva is growing chocolate habanero peppers in her room and selling them to local restaurants. Later, after Eva goes on to be a celebrity chef, she is heard from less, and other characters emerge to "miss her, love her, obsess about her" while they recount their own stories.

== Major themes ==
Nora Pouillon of The Washington Post wrote that Kitchens of the Great Midwest invokes the "strong interplay among food, family and our most cherished memories." Critic Dawn Drzal of The New York Times writes that, as the novel's name would suggest, Kitchens of the Great Midwest ultimately is a "gastronomic portrait" of the American Midwest, "from the rock bottom realities of microwave burritos and Subway 'sandwich artists' through the smelly artisanal tradition of lutefisk, the Scripture-based Resurrection rolls at county fair baking contests and the self-righteous antics of food purists."

== Literary reception ==
Kitchens of the Great Midwest has received strong reviews. In her New York Times review, Drzal called it a "colorful, character-driven story" with "a narrative that keeps readers turning the pages too fast to realize just how ingenious they are." Jessica Gelt of the Los Angeles Times called it a "lively portrait of a disparate group of Midwestern characters viewed through the prism of food" that is "part foodie fantasy, part family drama and all heart."
