= The Favorites =

2025 novel by Layne Fargo

- First edition hardcover
- Author: Layne Fargo
- Language: English
- Genre: Romantic fiction, sports fiction
- Publisher: Penguin Random House
- Publication date: January 14, 2025
- Publication place: United States
- Pages: 448
- ISBN: 9780593732045

The Favorites is a sports romance novel by American author Layne Fargo. It was published by Penguin Random House on January 14, 2025. It is a modern retelling of Wuthering Heights. The novel weaves in confessionals from the protagonists' peers between each chapter. It is set to be adapted into a Netflix original film.

== Background ==
The novel was inspired by Tessa Virtue's and Scott Moir's dance to the Moulin Rouge! soundtrack and the media's speculation into a potential romantic relationship.

The novel was initially two separate books—a gothic romance and a thriller about ice skaters. According to Fargo, neither were working until she decided to combine them as a retelling of Wuthering Heights.

Fargo's research process involved reading skaters' memoirs and reading through the archives of the U.S. Figure Skating magazine. Kat was based on Katarina Witt, while the Lins were partially based on Alex and Maia Shibutani. The rivalrous friendship between Kat and Bella was inspired by the friendship between Madison Hubbell and Gabriella Papadakis.

Fargo used her experience with chronic pain and the painful treatments she undergoes to help her write the scenes in which Kat pushes her body to the limit.

In the first draft, The Favorites was a screenplay.

== Synopsis ==
Katarina "Kat" Shaw and Heath Rocha, two orphans who grew up in poverty together, begin skating together as children in Lake Forest, Illinois. Kat is fueled by a desire to emulate gold medalist Sheila Lin, while Heath is fueled by his attachment to Kat. While skating, they form a passionate romantic relationship. In 2000, they compete with Sheila's twins, Garrett and Bella, at the National Championships. While they place sixth, they catch the attention of Sheila Lin, who is now heading her own skating school in Los Angeles and invites them to attend. In Los Angeles, Kat and Heath spend the next fourteen years continuing to skate together, having an on-and-off relationship while feuding with the Lins. However, a life-changing incident at the 2014 Winter Olympics brings their partnership to an end. Ten years later, an unauthorized documentary titled The Favorites: The Shaw & Rocha Story releases, prompting Kat to tell her own story after a decade of silence.

== Reception ==
The novel won an Alex Award. It was nominated for a Goodreads Choice Award for Romance.

Kirkus Reviews called the characterizations of the skaters "stereotype-driven", but complimented how the narrators of the documentary were written. Publishers Weekly called it "overly long", describing the interpersonal drama as "repetitive" and its parallels to Wuthering Heights "a foggy attempt". Lisa Levy of The Washington Post gave the novel a nine out of ten, praising its descriptions of skating and the relationship between Kat and Heath. In her review for Paste, Lacy Baugher Milas called the novel's refusal to apologize for its characters' worst traits "refreshing", and praised its "non-stop" cliffhangers for "keep[ing] the pages flying".

== Audiobook ==
An audiobook was released concurrently with the hardcover and ebook editions. Katarina was voiced by Christine Lakin, and was supported by an ensemble cast consisting of Louisa Zhu, Amy Landon, Elena Rey, Valerie Rose Lohman, Suzanne Toren, Graham Halstead, Julia Emelin, Layne Fargo, Eric Yang, Johnny Weir, and Brandon Perea.

The audiobook was nominated for an Audie Award for Fiction. Kirkus Reviews called the narrations "uniformly exception". Library Journal described the novel as "especially suited" to audio, and called Lakin's narration "fantastic".

== Film adaptation ==
A Netflix original film adapting the novel was announced on March 24, 2026. It is set to be produced by Cathy Schulman and written by Kate Gersten.
