= Broken Country =

2025 novel by Clare Leslie Hall

- First edition British hardcover
- Author: Clare Leslie Hall
- Language: English
- Genre: Thriller; historical romance; courtroom drama; murder mystery
- Publisher: Hachette UK
- Publication date: 4 March 2025
- Publication place: United Kingdom
- Pages: 320
- ISBN: 9781399820417

Broken Country is a historical fiction novel by British author Clare Leslie Hall. It was published by Hachette UK on 4 March 2025. The novel centers a love triangle between a woman and her farmer husband and her novelist childhood sweetheart, which ends in a murder trial. The novel switches between the 1950s, when the lead characters are teenagers, and the 1960s, when they are adults. The novel was a commercial and critical success upon release. An audiobook narrated by Hattie Morahan was released concurrently with the ebook and hardcover editions. A film adaptation was announced in April 2024.

== Background ==
The novel was inspired by a real-life event, when a farmer threatened to shoot Hall's youngest son's puppy when he strayed into a field of lambs. While this was happening, she could see a young boy run towards the farmer and his wife, and said that the young boy reminded them of the son they had recently lost and that there was a strong physical attraction between the boy's father and the farmer's wife.

The setting of the novel was inspired by the farmland that surrounds Hall's house. While researching the novel, she spent a lot of time with farmers, and learned how to milk cows. She was struck by how the farmers would stop and point out a moment of beauty, which she describes as opening her eyes to the beauty and brutality of pastoral life.

For the first two years of writing, the novel was primarily a contemporary romance, but there was always an element of suspense. Two years into writing, she decided to situate the novel in the 1950s and 1960s. She also decided she wanted to include a murder trial in the novel, but was unsure if she could do it, as she had never written a courtroom drama before. To prepare, she spent a week in the Old Bailey.

== Synopsis ==
In 1955, in a village in Dorset, working class seventeen-year-old Beth meets an upper class boy named Gabriel when she wanders onto the land that his family owns. They fall in love as they plan to go to Oxford University together to fulfill their dreams of becoming writers, but instead they break up as Beth stays in the village while Gabriel leaves for Oxford.

Thirteen years later, in 1968, Beth has given up her dream of becoming a poet and is instead married to a sheep farmer named Frank. Their son, Bobby, died two years prior at the age of nine. This strains their marriage as Frank is unable to give her space to grieve. When Gabriel, now a bestselling novelist, returns to the village with his son Leo after separating from his American wife, she finds herself torn between the two men. She also finds herself bonding with Leo, who reminds her of Bobby. Her life is further upended in 1969, when a farmer is murdered and someone close to her is put on trial in London.

== Reception ==
The novel spent twenty-six weeks on the New York Times Hardcover Fiction Best Seller List. It was nominated for a Goodreads Choice Award for Historical Fiction and Audiobook. It was also nominated for an Audie Award for Fiction. It was Reese Witherspoon's book club pick of March 2025. It was featured as one of Amazon's Best Books of 2025.

The novel received positive reviews upon release. Kirkus Reviews called the novel "elegantly written" and in particular praised the scenes that include Bobby, describing them as "touching". Publishers Weekly described Beth as a "fascinatingly complex lead". Ruby Eastwood of the Irish Independent called the novel "exhilarating". Henrietta McKervey commented that "a few notes don’t quite ring true" in her review for The Irish Times, but said it is ultimately "a vivid, forceful love story". Amazon editor Abby Abell called it "achingly beautiful"

== Adaptation ==
A film adaptation was announced on 9 April 2024, almost one year before the novel was released. It is set to be produced by Sony's 3000 Pictures and Reese Witherspoon's production company Hello Sunshine.
