= Marching Powder (book) =

Book by Rusty Young

- Cover of the first Australian edition
- Author: Rusty Young
- Language: English
- Genre: Biography/True Crime
- Publisher: Pan Macmillan
- Publication date: 2002
- Publication place: Australia
- Pages: 371pp
- ISBN: 073291180X
- Followed by: Colombiano

Marching Powder is a 2002 non-fiction book written by Australian author Rusty Young. It is based on the true story of a British-Tanzanian man, Thomas McFadden, who was apprehended in 1996 at La Paz airport in Bolivia with five kilos of cocaine in his suitcase and incarcerated in San Pedro prison. The book, described as "a gripping expose of life inside" and "the current must-read on the gringo trail", was released in 2003 and became a bestseller and a cult classic, having sold over 600,000 copies.

== Background ==
Rusty Young, a twenty-four-year-old law graduate, was backpacking in South America when he heard about Thomas McFadden, a convicted English drug trafficker who ran tours inside Bolivia's famous San Pedro Prison. Curious about the reason behind McFadden's huge popularity, Young went to La Paz and joined one of Thomas's illegal tours. They formed an instant friendship and then became partners in an attempt to record McFadden's experiences in the jail. Young bribed the guards to allow him to stay and for the next three months he lived inside the prison, sharing a cell with McFadden. At one point Young was arrested, interrogated and ordered to leave the country. He did so briefly before returning and offered an even larger bribe to officials to let him continue his stay.

Young has explained in interviews that what first attracted him to the idea of telling the story was McFadden's personality: "He was able to get through to people, make them feel safe immediately they were inside the prison, and make them want to come back. There were lots of tourists who had visited the week before who were coming back - people came back two or three times, not to do the tour again but just to talk to Thomas ... he had this unique charm."

== Summary ==
Marching Powder tells Thomas's story from when he arranged what he believed to be a routine cocaine-smuggling operation using a trusted airport contact. However his contact sold him out, and Thomas was detained at the airport. The cocaine was so well-hidden in Thomas's suitcase that the authorities could not find it, and it was only at the insistence of his former contact that the airport security officers cut into the suitcase to find the drugs. After this, the book chronicles Thomas's difficulties with the Bolivian justice system, the corruption of the court process and how he was betrayed by his lawyers. It is only after he was actually incarcerated in San Pedro that things improved for him. On a chaperoned night away from the prison, for which Thomas had paid a large bribe, he befriended an Israeli backpacker and regaled her with stories of his life in San Pedro. She insisted on seeing it for herself, and after that word spread along the gringo trail and Thomas was able to start a tour business within the prison. As reported by the Guardian, "Some backpackers even stayed overnight to take advantage of the dirt-cheap cocaine produced in the prison's makeshift labs. San Pedro became known as the best all-night party place in town."

The book covers the first meeting of Rusty and Thomas. During the period Rusty was living in San Pedro to record Thomas's story, another inmate who owed Thomas money tried to set him up to be found in possession of drugs. Rusty, using his legal skills, posed as Thomas's "international human rights lawyer" and as a result Thomas was found innocent of these additional charges. Because his original sentence had already expired as he waited for the new case to be heard, this finding of innocence meant that Thomas was now free. After securing Thomas's release, Rusty and Thomas lived in Colombia where Rusty taught the English language and finished writing Thomas's story. Rusty has also stated that he helped Thomas readjust to living outside the prison. "We lived together for three months and I helped him basically readjust to normal living, having to deal with such normal, boring things as paying the bills, paying the rent, getting up in the morning at the same time."

== Public reception ==
Marching Powder was first published in Australia to positive reviews and soon afterwards in the United Kingdom and United States. Media reports and reviews centred on the unusual prison conditions outlined in the memoir and this fuelled its popularity. One reviewer summed up the position as follows: "It is hard for a Westerner to comprehend that these are actual events – the stories of violence, of endemic corruption and blatant unfairness, are so incredible, they seem to be a well written novel." As reported by the BBC, "prisoners were expected to earn a living inside and buy their cells as if they were real estate. There was a primary school for the prisoners' children, who they brought to live with them, and in the most notorious twist of all, there was an in-house cocaine factory."

== Subsequent events ==
Thomas McFadden returned to the UK and painted houses for a living, before finally returning to his native Tanzania. Rusty has stated that he and Thomas have remained close friends, and that Thomas named his first son 'Rusty'. In 2015, Rusty and Thomas reunited and returned secretly to the prison to film a segment for Australia's Sunday Night program.

== Adaptation ==
A film adaptation of Marching Powder has been announced with little information released so far in regard to its production. Brad Pitt's Plan B Entertainment production company, Periscope Entertainment and Reason Pictures originally optioned the book and Don Cheadle was cast as Thomas McFadden. José Padilha was considered to write and direct. However subsequently the rights were acquired by New Regency and in June 2014 it was announced that Chiwetel Ejiofor would instead play McFadden. The 2025 film of the same name, starring Danny Dyer, is unrelated to this book.
