= Vanessa Lillie =

Cherokee suspense and mystery writer

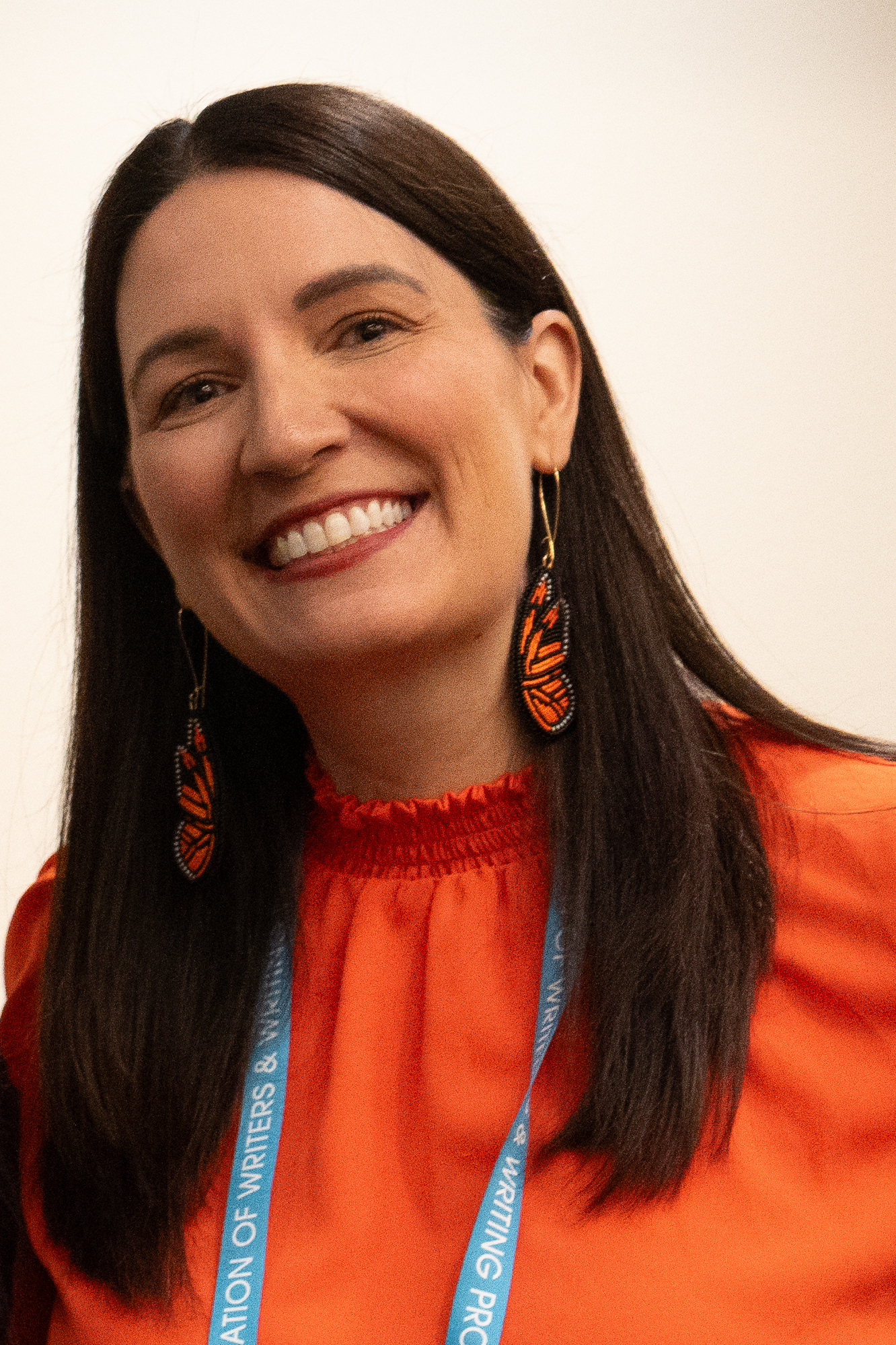
- Lillie at AWP 2026
- Born: Miami, Oklahoma, U.S.
- Alma mater: Rockhurst University; American University
- Occupation: Novelist
- Writing career
- Genres: Suspense; mystery; thriller
- Website: vanessalillie.com

Vanessa Lillie is a Cherokee suspense and mystery writer.

== Early life and education ==
Lillie is originally from Miami, Oklahoma and is a citizen of the Cherokee Nation. She attended Rockhurst University in Kansas City, Missouri. She then studied public administration at American University in Washington, DC.

== Career ==
Lillie's debut novel, Little Voices, was published in 2019. Lillie wrote “Home But Not Alone: A Coronavirus Diary” for The Providence Journal during the COVID-19 pandemic in 2020. Her second book, For the Best, was published in 2020.

Lillie started writing her third novel, Blood Sisters, in 2020 and was out of contract after the publication of her first two books. She has said that Blood Sisters contains many elements of her own identity. Like Lillie herself, her protagonist, Syd Walker, is a queer, white-presenting Cherokee from Northeast Oklahoma. Blood Sisters, which was published in 2023, was a national pick for the Good Morning America, Amazon, and Target book clubs.

== Personal life ==
Lillie lives in Rhode Island, on Narragansett land, with her husband and son. She is two-spirit and identifies as queer.

== Books ==
- Little Voices (2019)
- For the Best (2020)
- The Widows
  - Young Rich Widows — co-written with Kimberly Belle, Layne Fargo, and Cate Holahan (Audible original, 2022)
  - Desperate Deadly Widows — co-written with Kimberly Belle, Layne Fargo, and Cate Holahan (Audible original, 2024)
- Syd Walker series
  - Blood Sisters (2023)
  - The Bone Thief (2025)
