= Firefly Lane (novel) =

2008 historical fiction novel by Kristin Hannah

- Author: Kristin Hannah
- Language: English
- Genre: Historical fiction
- Publisher: St. Martin's Press
- Publication date: February 5, 2008
- Publication place: United States
- Media type: Print (hardback and paperback), audiobook, e-book
- Pages: 479
- ISBN: 9780312364083
- Followed by: Fly Away

Firefly Lane is a historical fiction novel written by American author Kristin Hannah published by St. Martin's Press in 2008. The story follows the friendship and bond of Tully Hart and Kate Mularkey throughout the years.

Netflix created an adaptation of the novel, titled "Firefly Lane" television adaptation airing with 2 seasons from February 2021 to April 2023, complete with 26 episodes.

== Plot summary ==
Kate Mularkey and Tallulah "Tully" Hart are only in middle school when they meet on Firefly Lane in Snohomish, Washington. Tully is dealing with a drug-addicted, negligent mother who goes by the name Cloud, while Kate is trying to feel confident and make more friends. The two quickly become inseparable and share a close friendship their entire lives.

This friendship takes them through many ups and downs and remains strong even as they follow different paths in life. Kate gets married and has three children, while Tully pursues a career in journalism.

== Development ==
Hannah drew inspiration for the novel from her own life growing up in Seattle, Washington in the 1970s and 1980s, as well as her experiences studying at the University of Washington.

== Reception ==
Firefly Lane spent 28 weeks on The New York Times Best Seller paperback fiction list in 2009. As of 2015, the novel has sold more than 1.2 million copies.

Publishers Weekly noted that "Hannah takes the easy way out with an over-the-top tear-jerker ending, though her upbeat message of the power of friendship and family will, for some readers, trump even the most contrived plot twists." Kirkus Reviews stated that "Dated sermonizing on career versus motherhood, and conflict driven by characters’ willed helplessness, sap this tale of poignancy."

== Adaptation ==
In 2019, it was announced that Netflix ordered a 10-episode streaming television series adapted from the novel with Maggie Friedman serving as writer, showrunner and executive producer, along with Stephanie Germain; and Hannah as co-executive producer. It premiered on February 3, 2021, starring Katherine Heigl as Tully Hart and Sarah Chalke as Kate Mularkey.
