= Dana Stevens (screenwriter) =

American screenwriter and producer (born 1963)

- Born: October 16, 1963 (age 63); Whittier, California, U.S.
- Spouse: Michael Apted (div.)

Dana Stevens (born October 16, 1963) is an American screenwriter, actress and television writer/producer.

== Early life ==
Dana grew up in Phoenix, Arizona and is a summa cum laude graduate of UCLA.

== Career ==
She has written films including The Woman King, starring Viola Davis and directed by Gina Prince-Bythewood; the Netflix hit Fatherhood, starring Kevin Hart; the adaptation of Nicholas Sparks' novel, Safe Haven, directed by Lasse Hallstrom; City of Angels, starring Nicolas Cage and Meg Ryan; For Love of the Game, directed by Sam Raimi; Blink, directed by Michael Apted; and Life or Something Like It, starring Angelina Jolie. She has also worked in TV, creating the 2006 ABC comedy-drama What About Brian and the 2014 CBS legal drama Reckless.

Stevens did an uncredited rewrite on The World Is Not Enough, directed by her then-husband Michael Apted, primarily to strengthen the female characters' roles. She was the last female screenwriter involved with writing a Bond film until Phoebe Waller-Bridge provided a script polish to No Time to Die in 2019.

She is a regular advisor at the Sundance Institute writer and filmmaker labs and serves on the final selection committee for the academy's Nicholl's Fellowship Screenwriting Award.

== Personal life ==
Stevens and director Michael Apted were married for 10 years before divorcing, and the couple have a son.

== Writing credits ==
- Blink (1993)
- City of Angels (1998)
- For Love of the Game (1999)
- The World Is Not Enough (1999) (Uncredited)
- Life or Something Like It (2002)
- What About Brian (2006–2007) (Also creator)
- Safe Haven (2013)
- Reckless (2014) (Also creator)
- Fatherhood (2021)
- The Woman King (2022)
- The Nightingale (2027)
