= Rusty Young (writer) =

Australian writer (born 1975)

- Born: 1975 (age 50–51); Sydney, New South Wales, Australia
- Occupation: Writer

Rusty Young (born 1975) is an Australian-born writer known for his book, Marching Powder published by Pan Macmillan Australia in 2003, and based on real life experiences in a Bolivian prison. Rusty Young is a commerce/law graduate from the University of New South Wales, who has lived most of his life in Sydney, Australia.

== Marching Powder ==
Rusty Young was backpacking in South America when he heard about Thomas McFadden (in the Lonely Planet guidebook and from other backpackers), a convicted English drug trafficker who ran tours inside Bolivia's famous San Pedro prison. Curious about the reason behind McFadden's huge popularity, the law graduate went to La Paz and joined one of the illegal tours. They formed an instant friendship and then became partners in an attempt to record McFadden's experiences in the jail. Young bribed the guards to allow him to stay and for the next three months he lived inside the prison, sharing a cell with McFadden. After securing McFadden's release, Young lived in Colombia where he taught the English language and wrote McFadden's story. The memoir, Marching Powder, was released in 2003 and became an international bestseller. In 2015 he returned secretly to the prison to film a segment for Australia's Sunday Night TV program.

== Counter-terrorism work in Colombia ==
Following the success of Marching Powder, Young was recruited as a Program Director of the US government's Anti-Kidnapping Program in Colombia. He explained in an interview with ABC Radio presenter Richard Fidler that the job was so dangerous he had to keep it secret even from close family members. Instead, he told people he worked as an executive in a corporation in Colombia, but alluded to the hazards of the position in interviews. For instance, the UNSW Law website quoted Young as saying: "At times it can be dangerous, so they’ve given me a bullet-proof car. I wake up every morning and know I’m a long way from my days at UNSW." Young finally revealed his work in anti-kidnapping to the Australian 60 Minutes program in July 2017.

== Colombiano ==
While living and working in Colombia, Young interviewed special forces soldiers, snipers, undercover intelligence agents and members of two terrorist organisations: the FARC and Autodefensas. He was particularly touched by the plight of child soldiers and decided to incorporate their stories into a novel. In January 2016, the rights to Colombiano, Rusty's second book, were sold by literary agent Simone Camilleri to Random House Australia after a competitive bidding war. Colombiano was released in August 2017 and became an immediate bestseller, being the highest selling fiction title by an Australian author in August 2017.

The novel, set in Colombia, is the story of one young man's descent into war and violence in order to avenge his father's murder. Commercial fiction publisher Beverley Cousins said: "From Rusty’s work with child soldiers in Colombia has grown a story that shocks, thrills and packs a strong emotional punch."

== Wildlands documentary ==
Young also fronts the documentary Wildlands (2017), produced by Ubisoft and Chief Productions, distributed by Journeyman Pictures, in which he interviews notorious characters formerly involved in the cocaine trade including George Jung – famously played by Johnny Depp in the movie Blow – and John Jairo Velasquez or “Popeye”, the right-hand man of Pablo Escobar and one of the deadliest hitmen in cartel history.

== List of works ==
- Marching Powder: A True Story of Friendship, Cocaine, and South America's Strangest Jail (book)- released 2003
- Marching Powder (film) - announced
- Colombiano (book) - released August 2017 (Australia), March 2019 (UK), April 2019 (US and Worldwide).
- Wildlands (documentary) - released November 2017
