= A Prisoner of Birth =

2008 novel by Jeffrey Archer

- First edition (UK)
- Author: Jeffrey Archer
- Language: English
- Genre: Novel
- Publisher: Macmillan (UK); St Martin's Press (US)
- Publication date: 6 March 2008
- Publication place: United Kingdom
- Media type: Print
- Pages: 400
- ISBN: 0-230-53142-3
- OCLC: 181422242

A Prisoner of Birth is a mystery novel by English author Jeffrey Archer, first published on 6 March 2008 by Macmillan. This book is a contemporary retelling of Dumas's 1844 novel The Count of Monte Cristo. The novel saw Archer return to the first place in the fiction best-seller list for the first time in a decade.

== Plot summary ==
After proposing to his childhood sweetheart Beth Wilson, Danny Cartwright takes her and her brother Bernie to celebrate at a nearby pub. In the pub, they are accosted by four people. Danny, Beth and Bernie attempt to leave the pub without getting involved in a fracas, but Spencer Craig, one of the four that confronted them, follows them out of the pub along with his friends.

A fight breaks out; Bernie is stabbed and dies. Danny is blamed for his murder in a well-orchestrated plot by Spencer (a barrister) and his friends: a popular actor, a drug-addicted aristocrat, and a young estate agent. Danny is arrested and convicted. Sentenced to 22 years in Belmarsh prison, the highest security jail in South-east London, United Kingdom, he encounters his two cellmates, Albert Crann, known as "Big Al," and Sir Nicholas Moncrieff. Meanwhile, outside the prison, Beth is pregnant with Danny's daughter.

Sir Nicholas slowly teaches Danny to read and to write. Their friendship grows closer, and Danny decides to dress like his friend in the hope that it will help his upcoming appeal. Danny begins to gather evidence for his appeal with the help of a young lawyer, Alex Redmayne, but unable to present the new evidence, Danny's appeal is denied, and he must serve his complete sentence in Belmarsh prison.

Nicholas is murdered by a fellow inmate and his death is made to be seen as a suicide by the murderer. The dead body is mistakenly presumed to be that of Danny's by the guards due to similarities between Nick and Danny's height and features. The timely intervention of Big Al leads to the subsequent escape of Danny who pretends to be Nick (who had completed his sentence in prison). On the outside of the prison, Danny pretends to be Nicholas. He finds that he must sort out his friend's family affairs before pursuing his goals of clearing his name and taking revenge upon the four individuals who framed him for Bernie's murder.

A legal battle between himself and Nicholas' hated uncle Hugo leaves Danny Cartwright in the possession of over 50 million pounds with which he plans to expose Spencer Craig and clear his name, so that he will be able to live with Beth and his daughter.

Danny is caught out by Spencer's friends and is held in custody. While his counsel begins Danny's bid for freedom his accusers are all brought to justice. Alex's father (an ex-barrister, QC, and Judge at the High Court) gains Danny's freedom and his name is cleared. Danny has another child and is called Nick in honour of his friend. Alex (his barrister) is made godfather for all his hard work in freeing Danny.
