= Christy Ottaviano Books =

Christy Ottaviano Books is a book imprint based at:

- Henry Holt and Company (2008-2020)
- Little, Brown and Company (2020-present)
