= Chocolate habanero =

Cultivar of the habanero chili

Chocolate Habanero
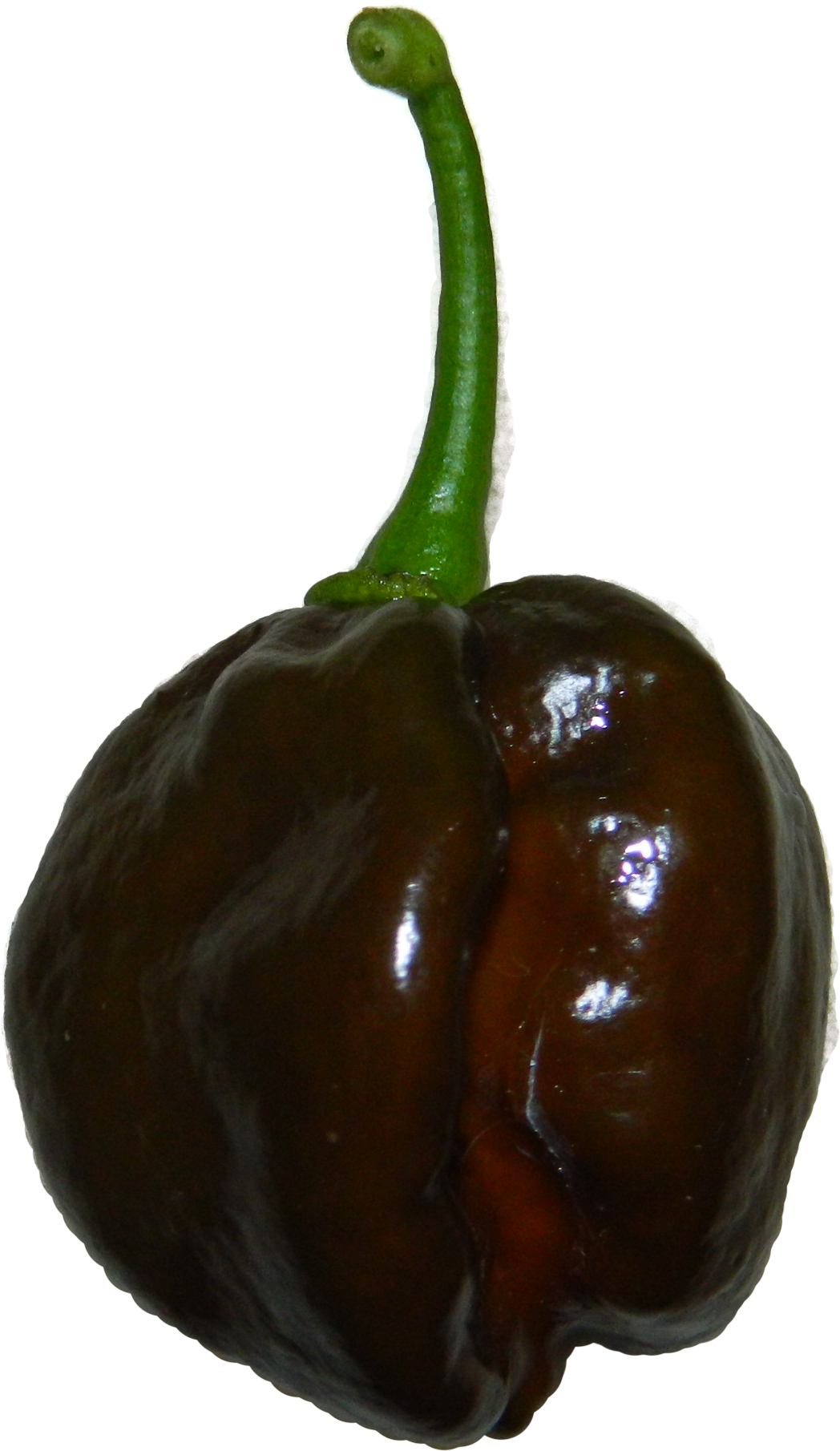
- A Chocolate habanero.
- Species: Capsicum chinense
- Cultivar: 'Habanero Negro'
- Heat: Very hot
- Scoville scale: 425,000-577,000 SHU

The Chocolate Habanero pepper is a cultivar of the habanero chili, which has been selectively bred to produce spicier, heavier, and larger fruit, ultimately more potent than its derivative.

== Description ==
Black habanero is an alternative name often used to describe the dark brown variety of chocolate habanero chilis (although they are slightly different, being slightly smaller and slightly more sphere-shaped). Some seeds have been found which are thought to be over 7,000 years old. The black habanero has an exotic and unusual taste, and is hotter than a regular habanero with a rating between 425,000 and 577,000 Scoville units. Small slivers used in cooking can have a dramatic effect on the overall dish. The chocolate habaneros take considerably longer to grow than other habanero chili varieties.

== Pungency ==
The Chocolate Habanero can be double the heat of an orange habanero. They taste somewhat smokier than normal habaneros.

== See also ==
- Race to grow the hottest pepper
- Scoville scale
- Habanero pepper
- Ghost pepper
