= Kristin Hannah =

American author

- Born: September 25, 1960 (age 66); California, U.S.
- Occupation: Novelist
- Writing career
- Period: 1991–present
- Genre: Fiction
- Notable works: Between Sisters, The Nightingale, Firefly Lane, The Great Alone, and The Women
- Notable awards: RITA award – Novel with Strong Romantic Elements; 2004 Between Sisters
- Website: www.kristinhannah.com

Kristin Hannah (born September 25, 1960) is an American writer. Her most notable works include Winter Garden, The Nightingale, Firefly Lane, The Great Alone, and The Four Winds. In addition to this, The Nightingale is has a film adaptation set to release on March 19, 2027 in the United States. Hannah's most recent work, The Women, was published in 2024. It is set in the United States in the 1960s during the Vietnam War.

== Career ==
Hannah published her first novel, A Handful of Heaven, in 1991.

=== Career breakthrough ===
Hannah's writing went through a major shift in the 2000s as she moved from category romance toward contemporary women's fiction, blending emotional storytelling with multigenerational narratives. Her breakthrough came with Firefly Lane (2008), which follows a decades-long friendship between two women. The novel became a bestseller and significantly expanded her readership. Its popularity grew further when Netflix adapted it into a television series released in 2021.

Another milestone was Winter Garden (2010), which places a present-day family drama with a historical narrative set during the Siege of Leningrad. Critics praised the novel for its emotional depth and its depiction of mother–daughter relationships. In The Seattle Times, a reviewer said Hannah showed an ability to shift between timelines and create a story that enraptures a family's "terrible, searing story, with a breathtaking, beautifully told ending".

=== Writing style and themes ===
Critics also point out her attention to historical detail; Michelle Rayburn highlights that she "weaves heart and history into her novels".

=== Major works ===
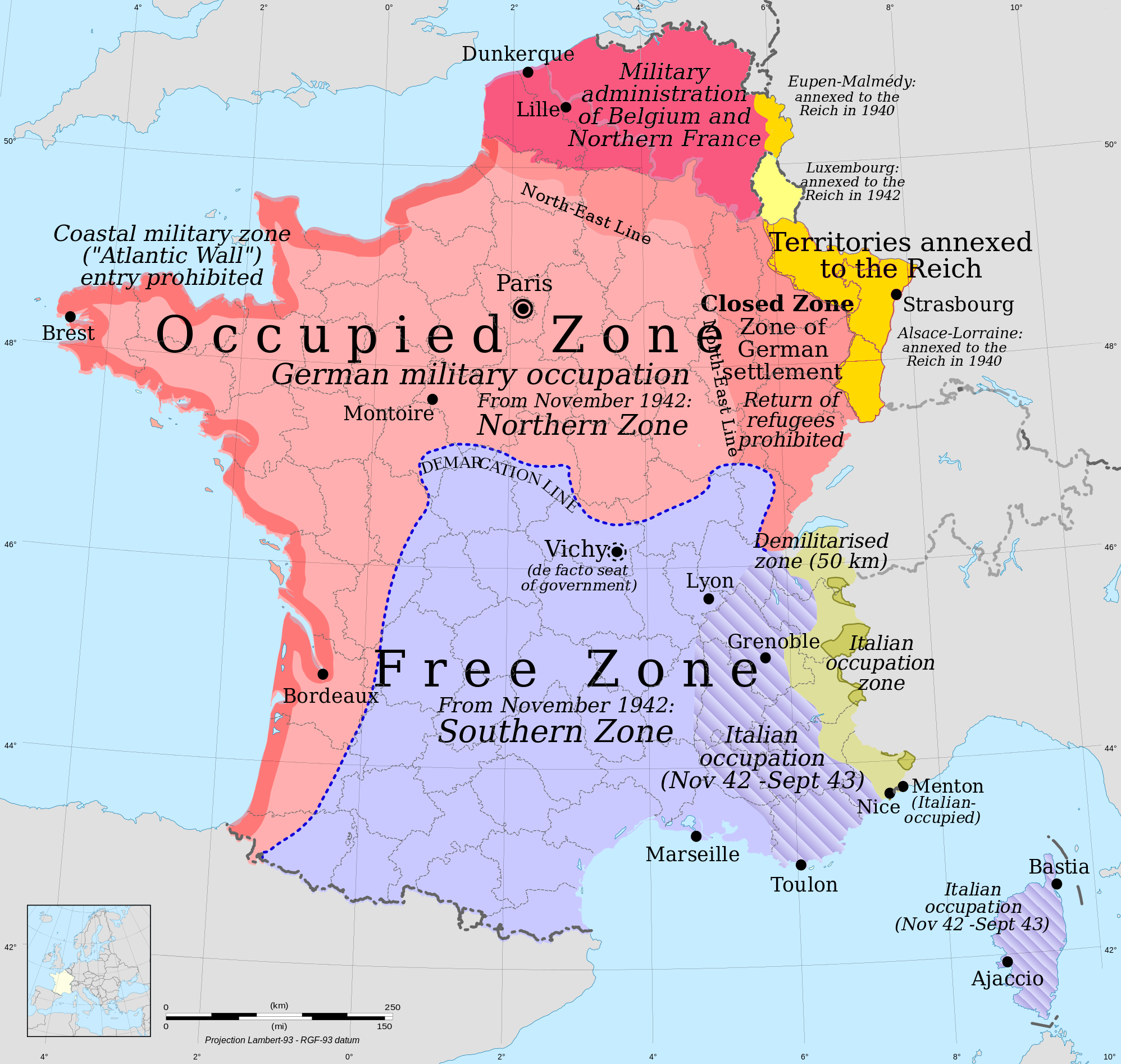
Image of Nazi Occupied France, the setting of Hannah's book The Nightingale

- Firefly Lane (2008) — This novel centers on a friendship between two women, showing their lives through adulthood. Firefly Lane was on The New York Times Best Seller paperback fiction list for 3 weeks. In 2021, it was adapted into a Netflix drama series.
- The Nightingale (2015) — This novel follows two sisters in occupied France during World War II, focusing on their survival, resistance, and sisterhood under extreme conditions. A film adaptation by TriStar Pictures has been announced.
- The Great Alone (2018) — Set in the Alaskan wilderness, this novel explores themes of survival, familial tension, and the effects of isolation. The Great Alone became a New York Times #1 bestseller, showcasing her wide success. Reviewers praised its writing and intense portrayal of domestic challenges and resilience in harsh conditions.
- The Four Winds (2021) — This novel looks at the Dust Bowl and Great Depression era, showing the economic hardship, migration, and the resilience of families during a national crisis.
- The Women (2024) — Set during the Vietnam war, this novel explores the life of a woman who volunteers to be an Army nurse during the conflict.

== Adaptations and media presence ==
Firefly Lane was made into a Netflix series starring Sarah Chalke and Katherine Heigl, which came out on February 3, 2021. It ran for two seasons on Netflix from 2021 to 2023, totaling 26 episodes. Hannah served as a co-executive producer with Maggie Friedman and executive producers Stephanie Germain and Katherine Heigl.

The film adaptation of The Nightingale is scheduled for theatrical release on March 19, 2027, produced by TriStar Pictures. Dakota Fanning and Elle Fanning will star as the novel's main sisters, with Michael Morris directing and Dana Stevens writing the screenplay.

Another three of Hannah's novels have films in development: The Women, The Great Alone, and Home Front.

== Personal life ==
Hannah and her family live on an island in Washington state, in a waterfront home, a setting that mirrors the Pacific Northwest environments that often appear in her novels.

== Published works ==
=== Standalone novels ===
- A Handful of Heaven (July 1991)
- The Enchantment (June 1992)
- Once in Every Life (December 1992)
- If You Believe (December 1993)
- When Lightning Strikes (October 1994)
- Waiting for the Moon (September 1995)
- Home Again (October 1996)
- On Mystic Lake (February 1999)
- Angel Falls (April 2000)
- Summer Island (March 2001)
- Distant Shores (July 2002)
- Between Sisters (April 2003)
- The Things We Do for Love (June 2004)
- Comfort and Joy (October 2005)
- Magic Hour (February 2006) (also published as Wild)
- Firefly Lane (2008)
- True Colors (2009)
- Winter Garden (2010)
- Night Road (March 2011)
- Home Front (2012)
- Fly Away (2013)
- The Nightingale (2015)
- The Great Alone (2018)
- The Four Winds (2021)
- The Women (2024)

== Awards and reception ==
- In 2015, The Nightingale became an international blockbuster and was Goodreads Best Historical Fiction award winner. It won the People's Choice Award in the same year, and was named a Best Book of the Year by Amazon, iTunes, and The Wall Street Journal.
- In 2018, The Great Alone instantly hit the New York Times Bestseller List at #1 and was named as Goodreads Best Historical Fiction novel of that year.
- In 2024, The Women hit #1 on the New York Times, USAToday, Washington Post, Los Angeles Times, Barnes and Noble, Publisher's Weekly, Indie, and Amazon bestseller lists. It was the top selling fiction title of 2024. It was the 2024 Winner of Goodreads Best Historical Fiction novel, and the Audie Award Winner, and a finalist in the Dayton Literary Peace Prize. It was longlisted for the New York Times Review Notable Books, NPR Best books of the Year, Amazon Best Books of the Year, Barnes and Noble Best Books of the Year, and Audible Best of the Year.
