= Caro Ramsay =

Scottish writer of crime fiction

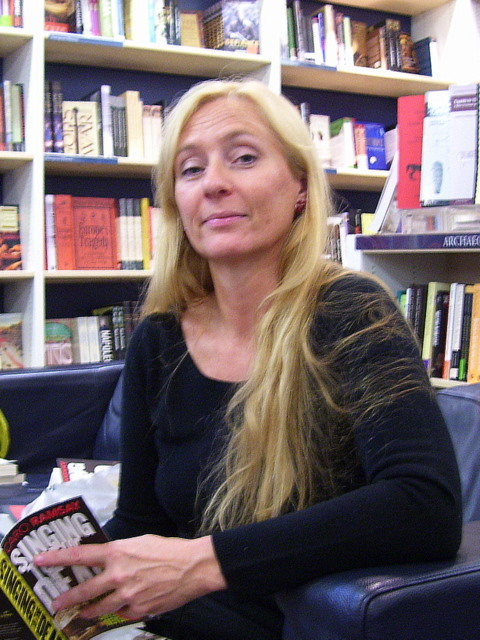
- Caro Ramsay in 2009
- Born: Govan, Glasgow, Scotland
- Education: British School of Osteopathy
- Occupations: Novelist, osteopath
- Writing career
- Genres: Tartan Noir, crime fiction
- Website: caroramsay.com

Caro Ramsay is a Scottish writer of crime fiction. Her first ten novels are police procedurals, set in Glasgow, featuring DI Colin Anderson and DS Freddie Costello.

== Biography ==
Caro was born in Govan, on Glasgow's south side. A graduate of the British School of Osteopathy, she runs a large osteopath centre in West Scotland, treating animals and humans, and writes in her spare time.

Her first novel, Absolution, was shortlisted for the CWA New Blood Dagger 2008 and her second, Singing to the Dead, was longlisted for the Theakston's Old Peculier Crime Novel of the Year Award 2010. The third in the series, Dark Water, was published on 4 August 2010, and the fourth book, The Blood of Crows, was published on 30 August 2012. Critic Cathi Unsworth in The Guardian opined that Ramsay's series "excels in sense of place, realism, plotting and caustic humour", describing it as "bleak, black and brilliant".

Ramsay was the subject of a 2007 BBC documentary film, and appeared on STV show The Hour in 2010.

=== Works ===
- Absolution (2007)
- Singing to the Dead (2009)
- Dark Water (2010)
- The Blood of Crows (2012)
- The Night Hunter (2014)
- The Tears of Angels (2015)
- Rat Run (2016)
- Standing Still (2017)
- The Suffering of Strangers (2017)
- The Sideman (2018)
- Mosaic (2019)
- The Red Red Snow (2020)
- On an Outgoing Tide (2021)
- The Silent Conversation (2021)

Note that Tambourine Girl was the working title of Singing to the Dead, not a separate book.

== See also ==
- List of people from Glasgow
- List of crime fiction writers
- List of female mystery writers
- List of Scottish novelists
