= The Women (Hannah novel) =

2024 historical fiction novel by Kristin Hannah

- First edition cover
- Author: Kristin Hannah
- Audio read by: Julia Whelan
- Language: English
- Genre: Historical fiction
- Publisher: St. Martin's Press
- Publication date: February 6, 2024
- Publication place: New York
- Media type: Print
- Pages: 480
- ISBN: 978-1-250-17863-3
- Dewey Decimal: 813/.54
- LC Class: PS3558.A4763 W66 2024

The Women is a historical fiction novel by American author Kristin Hannah, published by St. Martin's Press in 2024. The book tells the story of Frances "Frankie" McGrath, a young nurse who serves in the United States Army Nurse Corps during the Vietnam War. The novel debuted at number one on The New York Times fiction best-seller list.

== Background and inspiration ==
Hannah first came up with the idea for the novel 20 years prior to its publication. The story centered on a nurse and was initially a love story. She would occasionally revisit the project only to put it aside again. She began to work on it in early 2020, shortly after completing her novel The Four Winds. It was developed during the onset of the COVID-19 pandemic while she was confined to her home on a small island outside Seattle.

The book was inspired by Hannah's experience growing up during the war era, which she says "cast a huge shadow across [her] life". She was influenced by the public protests, marches, and social division about the war at the time as well as the later treatment of veterans upon returning home. In an interview with LibraryThing, Hannah commented:

For years, I wanted to write about the turbulence and chaos and division of the times, but it wasn't until the pandemic, when I was on lockdown in Seattle, confined to my home essentially, and watching our nurses and doctors serving on the front lines of the pandemic, becoming exhausted amid the political division of the time that it all came together for me. That's when I knew I was ready to write about the women who served in the war and were forgotten at home.

Hannah also spoke about wearing a silver prisoner of war bracelet when she was about 10 years old, one which commemorated her close friend's father who had been shot down as pilot in the war. Her friend's father never returned home, and she wore the bracelet for many years, and as a result "was reminded of him and his service and war each day." In the book, after attending a march by Vietnam Veterans Against the War in Washington, D.C., Frankie encounters two volunteers for the National League of POW/MIA Families, from whom she buys a silver cuff bracelet on which the name of a missing soldier and the date of his disappearance are engraved: "Maj. Robert Welch 1-16-1967."

In her research, Hannah read several memoirs by nurses who served in Vietnam, many of whom experienced difficulty adjusting to civilian life and were afflicted with post-traumatic stress disorder.

Hannah chose Frankie to be the novel's central character, as opposed to fellow combat nurses Ethel or Barb, partly due to Frankie's naivete and Southern California origin, which Hannah felt she could empathize with due to her own upbringing in Garden Grove, California.

== Reception ==
The novel debuted at number one on The New York Times combined fiction best-seller list for the week ending February 10, 2024. As of the week ending March 30, 2024, the novel spent 8 consecutive weeks atop the list. It spent a total of 10 weeks at number one, making it the most frequent weekly best seller of the year. In 2024, the book was one of the most borrowed titles in American public libraries.

Kirkus Reviews assessed the novel as a "dramatic, vividly detailed reconstruction of a little-known aspect of the Vietnam War." In her review in The New York Times Book Review, Beatriz Williams wrote, "Hannah takes up the Vietnam epic and re-centers the story on the experience of women ... Hannah is in top form here, plunging the reader into the chaotic miseries of the combat zone. She deploys details to visceral effect." Alice Cary of BookPage wrote that "Hannah demonstrates her knack for blending broad sweeps of history with page-turning plots to immediately engross legions of readers in even the most difficult of subjects."

In her review for The Boston Globe, Meredith Maran panned the novel for resorting to cliché and criticized Hannah for "underestimating her readers", concluding, "Cut by half, edited to delete the predictable, the "matronizing," and the obvious, The Women would have been an even stronger contribution to Hannah's body of work, and to her millions of fans' understanding of American history."

== Film adaptation ==
In January 2024, Warner Bros. Pictures preemptively acquired the screen rights to The Women for a film adaptation.
