= Kristen DiMercurio =

American voice-over artist, writer and podcaster

Kristen DiMercurio, also known as Bluetooth Lady, is an American voice actress, writer and podcaster. As of January 2025, she has contributed to over 8,000 voice spots for commercials, phone systems, video games and audiobooks.

== Biography ==
DiMercurio began her career on the science fiction podcast Ars Paradoxica.

She said her voice is best known with Bluetooth device messages. These include the messages "Bluetooth connected" and "your Bluetooth device is ready to connect". Some listeners assumed her voice was artificially generated, but in a 2024 interview she said that she and other voice-over actors are "just regular people who talk into microphones". DiMercurio said in a 2024 interview that she likes to perform in a crew, but has also said that finding the right creative troupe for many projects remains a challenge, despite social media making it easier to reach a wider audience. She contributes to both fiction and nonfiction audiobooks. DiMercurio work on the audiobook Deliah Green Doesn't Care received an AudioFile Award in 2022, and an Audie Award in 2023.

DiMercurio is queer, which she realized as a teenager. In a 2023 interview, she said that she has developed a sense of belonging and friends including TV hosts within the LGBTQ community.

== Filmography ==
=== Video games ===
Year	Title	Role	Ref
2023	Marvel Move	Black Widow	
