= San Pedro prison =

Prison in La Paz, Bolivia

Coordinates: 16°30′11″S 68°08′04″W

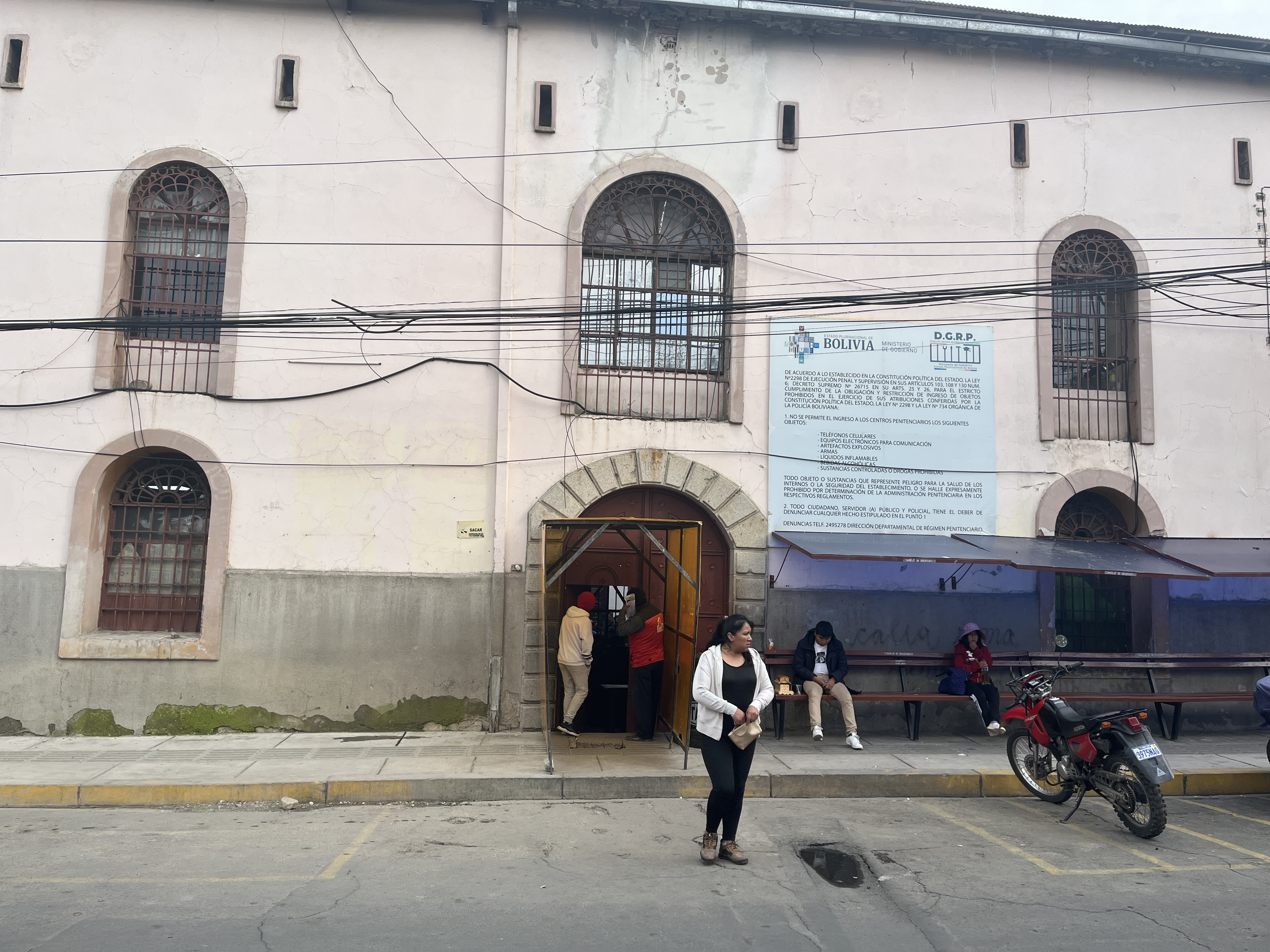
The main entrance of San Pedro prison in 2024

San Pedro prison or El penal de San Pedro (Saint Peter's Prison) is the largest prison in La Paz, Bolivia, and is renowned for being a society within itself. Significantly different from most correctional facilities, inmates at San Pedro have jobs inside the community, buy or rent their accommodation, and often live with their families. Prior to 2009, an illegal tourist trade flourished at the prison, with some tourists staying overnight at a hotel inside; the sale of cocaine base to visiting tourists gave some prisoners a significant income. Elected leaders enforce the laws of the community, primarily through stabbing. The prison is home to nearly 3,000 inmates (not including the women and children that live inside the walls with their convicted husbands).

The book Marching Powder, written by Rusty Young and published in 2003, describes the experiences of the British inmate Thomas McFadden who became known for offering prison tours to tourists. Another book El Choco, by Markus Lutteman, was published in 2007 and tells the story about Jonas Andersson, a Swedish inmate who offered prison tours to tourists from Posta, the richest area of San Pedro.

== Prison layout ==
The prison was originally designed to hold 600 inmates and now holds nearly 3000 inmates. Inmates must purchase their own cells from other inmates because cells are not assigned by or run by any uniformed prison officials. The names of the housing section are Posta, Pinos, Alamos, San Martin, Prefectura, Palmar, Guanay and Cancha. Of those, Posta, Pinos, and Alamos are considered the higher end communities and act similar to gated communities. Each section has a rating that indicates its housing quality. Representatives of the higher end communities usually lock non-residents out around 9:00 p.m. The lower end communities are said to house the drug addicted inmates and are identified as the most dangerous at nighttime where most stabbings occur. Each section operates like a small village or neighborhood, with its own courtyard, restaurants, markets, and services.

The wealthiest area, "La Posta", provides inmates with private bathrooms, a kitchen, and cable television; such cells are sold for around 1,500-1,800 Bolivianos. Wealthier inmates can buy luxury cells that may include three floors and a hot tub. One inmate paid for a second floor extension to be built on his cell, giving him views across the city. However, most of those inside the prison live in cramped conditions with it being common for single-room cells to accommodate five people.

Almost all living sections contain market stalls and places to play games such as billiards, poker, chess, or, in some, video games. The canteen and restaurants are owned and run by the inmates, while other places sell ingredients for those with kitchens to cook for themselves.

One of the larger open areas doubles as a small football pitch, with teams representing each sector regularly competing. Within the walls there is also a hotel for visiting guests, a hospital, and multiple churches.

== Prison guards ==
San Pedro prison is guarded by police officers rather than a hired civilian force as in many western countries. Their primary job is to patrol the border of the prison walls. Latin American prisons like San Pedro are often referred to as “depósitos” or “warehouses” because guards/officers are only concerned with keeping inmates confined in the prison (and stopping riots) without regard for what happens to them inside. The reason for this disregard of prison conditions is rooted in a lack of authority. Bolivian judicial authority is maintained throughout the inmate's sentence, giving the penal system itself no control over what happens to the inmate. As sociologist Christopher Birkbeck puts it, “Those who staff the penal bureaucracy are merely custodians for the judicial system and they generally know it.” They don't carefully control what the inmates do within the prison because they have no legal authority to punish or reward their behavior.

Such lack of authority, coupled with the economic hardships of living in a poverty-stricken country, makes the guards especially vulnerable to bribery by inmates. Such bribery is demonstrated in the prison's issue with cocaine trafficking. Guards are commonly bribed by prisoners to assist in the trafficking of drugs in and out of the prison. Bribery is so interwoven into the country's corrections that inmates must sometimes bribe officials to even receive a trial, in addition to paying any lawyer fees necessary to plead their case.

== Section committees ==
There are eight democratically elected section committees. The committee in charge of each section manages it. They perform various maintenance duties like sidewalk repair and the painting of walls. A director sets an assessment charge for inmates and each committee is responsible for its own budget. Inmates who wish to be part of one of the committees must campaign. The various positions include representative, treasurer, discipline secretary, culture and education secretary, sports secretary, and health secretary. To be eligible for a position an inmate must have lived in the prison for more than six months, have an un-mortgaged cell and have no outstanding debt. Despite being fairly governed by inmates without guards, disciplinary secretaries are in charge of disciplinary actions to end disputes and punish those who don't follow the rules. Section representatives also have the power to send inmates to isolation cells which resemble cells at a traditional prison with official prison guards who patrol the area and give the prisoners their meals. Prisoners in isolation are not allowed the same freedoms as those in the regular prison areas. Inmates who continue to misbehave after being in isolation can be transferred by request of a section representative to the maximum-security prison Chonchorro. The reception committee, made up of volunteer inmates, protects newcomers by greeting them when they enter the prison and advises them of the rules they should respect.

== Housing and real estate ==
When an inmate enters the prison they can either purchase a cell from the prison mayor or through a freelance real estate agent. The mayor charges around 50 percent more than the freelance agents and housing in the prison varies between $20 and $5,000 depending on the quality. Freelance agents who work on commission place advertisements in prison restaurants and bulletin boards. A nonrefundable fee of around 20 to 25 percent is charged when inmates purchase a cell. This fee covers community maintenance, administration, cleaning, renovating and occasional social events such as Prisoner's Day. Prisoner's Day occurs every September. Section leaders barbecue and hire a live band to come and play for the inmates. If a cell is available and the inmate pays his entrance fee, sections usually don't deny an inmate; however, the more expensive sections sometime require a resident to recommend an applicant and some representatives can expel residents for smoking cocaine. Each owner of a cell holds a title to the property that contains the room number, location, and a brief description, the name of the previous owner and the sale price. Inmates who have agreed on a price make copies of the title and give them to their section leader who watches as inmates sign a sale purchase contract and then verifies the transaction and stamps the contract with the section's official seal. A witness signs as well to verify the exchange. If an inmate cannot afford a cell they can rent a space from someone who owns multiple cells. Some sections will also allow a poor prisoner to stay in a small room if he works for the section.

== Demographics ==
Aside from the 1,500 prisoners and the guards there are numerous others inside the prison walls. The wives and children of the inmates often stay inside the walls but are allowed to come and go as they please. Without the income of the husband they often cannot afford to live by themselves in the city. They will often provide an important link with the outside and can bring items into the prison that are sold from the market stalls or directly from cells. The 200 children are cared for in two nurseries inside the prison walls or are educated in nearby schools; they spend the rest of their time playing within the prison grounds.

Many of the mothers of children who are imprisoned are located at the women's prison of Miraflores which is also in La Paz. It houses over 400 children who come with their mothers when they have no other choice. Conditions within Miraflores are similar to San Pedro in terms of inmate responsibility and rule making. However, Miraflores has more police security and is considered a high security prison.

Around 80% of the inmates are serving sentences or awaiting trial for drug-related offences, and around 75% of the total prisoner population are awaiting trial. There are on average four deaths every month inside the prison from natural causes or from violent attacks. The police rarely enter the prison.

Unlike in many other countries, inmates here have the right to vote in the Bolivian national elections. Political candidates visit the prison to try to increase their support inside the community.

== Income ==
There are several sources of income for the prisoners and those who run the establishment. Embol, the Bolivian brewery which owns the exclusive rights to produce Coca-Cola in Bolivia, has a deal whereby their products are advertised and sold inside the prison and rival brands are banned and in return they provide cash, tables, chairs, and umbrellas for the grounds. Most prisoners have jobs such as messengers, hairdressers, and shopkeepers, with many profiting from the tourist trade. Many inside the prison work as tour guides or sell handmade crafts to the visitors, and tourism provides many of them with a source of income. There is also a gambling trade, with betting on the inter-section football matches being worth up to US$20,000 a year. Players are also sometimes bought and sold between teams.

Cocaine is produced inside the compound with large laboratories producing a significant amount of the drug while other inmates utilise crude processing systems in their own cells. Consequently, the amount of drug use and addiction around the prison is very high. The cocaine is then trafficked outside, meaning that the prison is a large supplier of the drug. Alcohol is also widely available and its sale is an important source of income for some of those inside the prison.

== Tourism ==
Although tourism in the prison of San Pedro is illegal, prior to 2009, many entrants could gain access to a tour by bribing the guards at the perimeter. The fee to enter the prison was around $57 US dollars or 400 boliviano. After being searched by the guards entrants are told to make sure they leave before 6pm and not to take any pictures. Despite the perceived dangers and legal issues regarding the tours, the prison was estimated to have once had approximately 50 tours daily.

After turning a blind eye to the illegal tourism for many years, the Bolivian government finally put an end to the practice in 2009, after a video taken by a tourist inside the prison was uploaded on YouTube, and local TV networks reported on the issue.

== Laws ==
Inside San Pedro prison the inmates have developed their own laws and rules. Annually, each sector elects a delegate (leader) and a financial secretary. There is little tolerance for those who have committed crimes against women or children and they are strongly disciplined by other inmates. Many are killed, and those who survive must pay for the services of the prison hospital.

== See also ==
- Palmasola prison, also in Bolivia
