= Eleanor Oliphant Is Completely Fine =

2017 novel by Gail Honeyman

- Paperback first edition (UK)
- Author: Gail Honeyman
- Audio read by: Cathleen McCarron
- Language: English
- Subjects: social isolation • trauma • loneliness • alcoholism • intergenerationality • love • mental health • domestic abuse • schizoid personality • obsession • projection • suicide • disillusionment • recovery
- Genre: literary fiction
- Publisher: HarperCollins (UK); Pamela Dorman Books (US); Viking Press (CAN)
- Publication date: 18 May 2017
- Media type: Print (hardback, paperback), e-book, kindle, audiobook
- Pages: 383
- ISBN: 978-0008172114

Eleanor Oliphant Is Completely Fine is the 2017 debut novel by Gail Honeyman, and the winner of the 2017 Costa Debut Novel Award. The story centres on Eleanor Oliphant, a social misfit with a traumatic past who becomes enamoured with a singer, whom she believes she is destined to be with. The novel deals with themes of isolation and loneliness, and depicts Eleanor's transformational journey towards a fuller understanding of self and life.

== Plot ==
Eleanor Oliphant, the novel's protagonist and narrator, lives in Glasgow, Scotland, and works as a finance clerk for a graphic design company. At the novel's outset, she is 29 years old. She is academically intelligent, with a degree in Classics and high standards of literacy. Every day on her lunch break she completes the Daily Telegraph crossword. However, she is socially awkward and leads a solitary lifestyle. She has no friends or social contacts, and every weekend consumes two bottles of vodka. She takes little interest in her appearance, having gone without a haircut since she was 13.

Not considering that she has a problem, Eleanor repeatedly describes herself as "absolutely fine", and even when obvious moments of awkwardness arise in her interactions with others, she tends to blame the other person's "underdeveloped social skills". Her colleagues regard her as a bit of a joke, and refer to her as "Wacko Jacko" or "Harry Potter"; while she regards them as "shirkers and idiots".

Clues gradually emerge to Eleanor's troubled past. She has a badly scarred face; knows nothing about her father; spent much of her childhood in foster care and children's homes; and, as a student, spent two years living with an abusive boyfriend who regularly physically assaulted her. Twice yearly she receives a routine visit from a social worker to monitor her progress. Her mother now appears to be confined to an unidentified institution: she phones Eleanor for a 15-minute conversation on Wednesday evenings. It is clear that Eleanor's mother is both vindictive and manipulative.

Several developments advance the narrative. Eleanor develops a crush on Johnnie Lomond, lead singer in a local band, having won tickets to a concert in a work raffle. She becomes convinced that he is the "love of [her] life" and "husband material". She starts to follow his Twitter feed, discovers where he lives, and visits his building. In anticipation of meeting him, she begins an unprecedented regime of personal grooming: she has a bikini wax, and later a manicure and haircut, buys new clothes, and visits a Bobbi Brown beauty store for makeup advice.

On leaving work one day with a new colleague, Raymond Gibbons, they witness an elderly man, Sammy Thom, collapse in the street. At Raymond's insistence, they call an ambulance, and help save his life. They are subsequently drawn into a series of encounters with Sammy and his grateful family, and in the process an embryonic friendship grows between Eleanor and Raymond.

Eleanor attends another long-anticipated Johnnie Lomond concert, certain that this is the moment at which they will meet, and the pieces of her life will start to fall into place. Instead, she finds that she is hidden in the crowd, and that Johnnie is unaware of her presence. When, to fill a gap in the performance, he moons the audience, she realises that he is not the refined soul-mate she had imagined. A dry ice stage effect stirs disturbing recollections of a traumatic fire in her past. She returns to her flat in despair, retreating into an intense three-day drinking binge and assembling materials for a suicide attempt – a hoard of painkillers; a bread knife; and a bottle of drain cleaner.

Eleanor is found by Raymond, sent by their boss to investigate her absence from work. He helps clean her up, puts her on the road to recovery, and continues to visit regularly over the following days. He even brings her an abandoned cat for company, which Eleanor appreciates. At Raymond's urging, she visits her GP, who refers her to a mental health counsellor. Eleanor eventually returns to work, where she is warmly greeted. Gradually, with the help of both the counsellor and Raymond, she ends her weekly contact with her mother, and her full childhood story emerges, including details that she had suppressed. When she was 10, her mother had started a house fire with the intention of killing both Eleanor and her four-year-old sister, Marianne. Although Eleanor survived, her mother and Marianne died. Eleanor Oliphant is not her birth name, but rather a new legal name given to her after the incident to protect her identity. The weekly phone conversations with her mother have been entirely in Eleanor's imagination.

== Themes and tone ==
The novel deals with themes of loneliness, prejudice, trauma recovery, small acts of kindness, and friendship. In an interview with Costa, Honeyman said:

I read a newspaper article about loneliness and unusually this article contained an interview with a young woman and she said she'd often leave work on Friday night at 5 o'clock and wouldn't talk to another human being until she went back to work on Monday morning. I was really struck by that because I hadn't really heard of a young person's perspective on it before and it was very contrary to the media portrayal of people in their twenties often that life is just one big, long party – nights out, very social. So from that little seed, the character and then the story of Eleanor Oliphant emerged.

It is written from the perspective of an unreliable narrator, though not one motivated by malice or a desire to deceive – as is often the case – but rather as a reflection of the character's lack of self-awareness caused by psychological scars from a traumatic past.

Humour is used to lighten and contrast with the darker themes. The novel has been identified as a notable example of "up lit", referring to uplifting literature which features stories of kindness, compassion, and hope. It has also been credited with raising the popularity of uplifting literature among the public, as since its publication a marked rise has been observed in the number of up lit novels making best-seller lists.

== Reception ==
Jenny Colgan, reviewing for The Guardian, described the novel as "a narrative full of quiet warmth and deep and unspoken sadness" with a "wonderful, joyful" ultimate message. Allan Massie of The Scotsman noted the book's unusual emphasis on "the importance of kindness", and found it to be reminiscent of a Jane Austen novel in its depiction of the "moral education of her heroine": it was, he said, and "an uncommonly intelligent and sympathetic novel". Sarah Gilmartin of The Irish Times called the title character "one of the most unusual and thought-provoking heroines of recent contemporary fiction".

The novel received the 2017 Costa Debut Novel Award. For the British Book Awards for 2018, Eleanor Oliphant Is Completely Fine won the "Début Book of the Year" and "Overall Winner" awards (the latter chosen by public vote), and also the "Marketing Strategy of the Year" award.

== Audiobook ==
The audio version of the book, narrated by Cathleen McCarron and published by Penguin Audio, won the 2018 US Audie Award for Fiction and AudioFile Magazine's AudioFile Earphones Award in 2017. Publishers Weekly described McCarron's performance as "award-worthy", and her portrayal of Eleanor as "by turns comical in her obliviousness to basic things and utterly heartbreaking in discussing her past".

== Film rights ==
In May 2017 the film rights were optioned by Reese Witherspoon's company Hello Sunshine. In December 2018 it was announced that Metro-Goldwyn-Mayer would also be involved in the production.
