= The Great Alone =

2018 historical fiction novel by Kristin Hannah

- First edition
- Author: Kristin Hannah
- Language: English
- Genre: Historical fiction
- Set in: Alaska
- Publisher: St. Martin's Press
- Publication date: February 6, 2018
- Publication place: United States
- Media type: Print (hardback and paperback), audiobook, e-book
- Pages: 440
- ISBN: 9780312577230

The Great Alone is a semiautobiographical novel written by American author Kristin Hannah published by St. Martin's Press in 2018. The story follows the Allbright family's move to the Alaskan wilderness and the ensuing challenges they face there.

== Development ==
The title The Great Alone is a reference to Robert W. Service's poem "The Shooting of Dan McGrew". Hannah cites her family, 1970s politics, and Alaskan culture as inspirations for the novel.

Hannah had initially written a whole draft of a thriller with the same characters trying to solve a crime that had taken place in the past, but during revisions only kept the 1970s Alaska setting; then started writing a first-person point-of-view novel from a teenage narrator.

== Reception ==
The Great Alone spent four weeks at number one on The New York Times Fiction Best Seller list in 2018, and two weeks at number one on the Los Angeles Times hardcover fiction bestsellers list. It was 17th on USA Today's 2018 year-end top 100 best-selling books list. The novel won Best Historical Fiction at the 2018 Goodreads Choice Awards. As of 2021, the novel has sold two million copies in the United States.

The novel was featured in positive starred reviews by Publishers Weekly and Kirkus Reviews. The Toronto Star praised its "compassionate, nuanced portrait of the “twisted love" that results from domestic violence, and of the ways in which women cope with such abuse." The Star Tribune stated that Hannah "has created an atmosphere of brooding paranoia and simmering violence that can set your heart racing. Anticipated plot twists unravel unexpectedly." However, Janet Maslin of The New York Times criticized the novel, calling it "a heart-tugger written in borderline young adult style, combining terrible troubles with notes of overripe romance." Ron Charles of The Washington Post noted that "the weaknesses of The Great Alone are usually camouflaged by its dramatic and often emotional plot."

== Adaptation ==
Before the book's publication, Variety announced Sony's TriStar Pictures had preemptively purchased movie rights to The Great Alone, with Elizabeth Cantillon of the Cantillon Company and Laura Quicksilver as producers and Julia Cox as the screenwriter.
