= Layne Fargo =

American author

- Education: Indiana University of Pennsylvania
- Occupations: Novelist; podcast host
- Spouse: Nathan Miller
- Writing career
- Period: 2019–present
- Genres: Thriller; romance
- Website: laynefargo.com

Layne Fargo is an American author, known for writing feminist novels. She is also the cohost of Unlikeable Female Characters. Her third novel, The Favorites, is set to be adapted into a film produced by Netflix.

== Early life and education ==
Fargo has been writing since she was a child. She completed a theater/English double major at Indiana University of Pennsylvania. She met her husband, fellow theater major Nathan Miller, at Indiana University Pennsylvania. She also has a background in theater, women's studies, and library science. She has two graduate degrees. She wrote her Master's thesis on neo-burlesque and the female gaze. She previously worked as a dramaturg.

== Career ==
Fargo first tried writing a novel in 2012, for National Novel Writing Month. She called the novel "pretty awful", and it was rejected by over 100 agents. However, she repurposed the protagonist, Kira, for a book that would later become her published debut, Temper.

She became a Pitch Wars mentee in 2017. She became a mentor is 2019, co-mentoring with Halley Sutton.

She likes to write about things that make her angry, such as the patriarchy. She has stated that she is “always trying to push back against patriarchal heteronormative narratives”.

She cohosts a podcast titled Unlikeable Female Characters with Kristen Lepionka and Wendy Heard.

She is the vice president of the Chicagoland Chapter of Sisters in Crime.

A Netflix original film adapting the novel was announced on March 24, 2026. It is set to be produced by Cathy Schulman and written by Kate Gersten.

Fargo is working on a book about a Broadway musical about vampires, which premiered in the 1990s and is now experiencing a revival. It will focus on three women: the lead of the original run who is now producing the revival, the director of the revival, and the lead of the revival.

== Personal life ==
Fargo lives in Chicago with her husband, therapist Nathan Miller, and their pets. She is a longtime ice skating enthusiast. She is a feminist. She has chronic pain, and undergoes treatments such as massages, dry needling, and Pilates to manage it. She is bisexual.

== Bibliography ==
- Temper (2019)
- They Never Learn (2020)
- The Widows — series co-written with Kimberly Belle, Cate Holahan, and Vanessa Lillie
  - Young Rich Widow (2022)
  - Desperate Deadly Widows (2024)
- "The Ravages" (2023; short story from In These Hallowed Halls)
- The Favorites (2025)
