= The Nightingale (Hannah novel) =

2015 historical fiction novel by Kristin Hannah

- Author: Kristin Hannah
- Audio read by: Polly Stone
- Language: English
- Genre: Historical fiction
- Published: 2015
- Publisher: St. Martin's Press
- Publication place: United States
- Media type: Print (hardback)
- Pages: 564
- ISBN: 978-0-312-57722-3

The Nightingale (2015) is a historical fiction novel by American author Kristin Hannah published by St. Martin's Press. The book tells the story of two sisters in France during World War II and their struggle to survive and resist the German occupation there.

The book was inspired by accounts of a Belgian woman, Andrée de Jongh, who helped downed Allied pilots escape Nazi territory.

The Nightingale entered multiple bestseller lists upon release. As of 2021, it has been published in 45 languages and sold more than 4.5 million copies worldwide.

== Synopsis ==
The book uses the frame story literary device; the frame is presented in first-person narration as the remembrances of an elderly woman in 1995, whose name is initially not revealed. She has a son named Julien and lives off the coast of Oregon. However, the main action of the book is told in third-person, following two sisters, Vianne Mauriac and Isabelle Rossignol, who live in France around 1939, on the eve of World War II. The two sisters are estranged from each other and their father, and the book follows the two different paths they take.

Vianne, the elder sister, is a married schoolteacher raising her 8-year-old daughter Sophie in her childhood home named Le Jardin in the town of Carriveau. Vianne's husband Antoine is drafted and subsequently captured as a prisoner of war. At home, Vianne copes with the occupation of France after defeat by the Germans, and struggles to keep her and her daughter alive in the face of poor food rations, the loss of her job, and dwindling money left behind by Antoine.

She is forced to accept billeting of Wehrmacht and SS officers at her home, and sees the increasing persecution of the Jews in town. The first officer billeted at her home is Wolfgang Beck, a kindly man who has a family in Germany. The second is Von Richter, a more sadistic officer who subjects Vianne to physical and sexual abuse.

Later in the novel, Vianne's best friend, Rachel de Champlain, is deported to a concentration camp. Vianne adopts Rachel's three-year-old son, Ari, and renames him as "Daniel" to hide his Jewish identity. Soon after, Vianne undertakes to hide nineteen more Jewish children in a nearby abbey's orphanage. Meanwhile, Von Richter uses sexual violence as a means of control over Vianne.

When the war ends, Antoine returns from the POW camp, but they must both cope with the aftermath of the occupation. Vianne is 1 month pregnant by Von Richter, but she decides not to tell her husband this. She has come to love Ari like a son, but must give him up as his cousins in the United States claim him to be raised there.

Isabelle, the younger and more impetuous sister, decides to take an active role in resisting the occupation. After being expelled from finishing school, she travels from Paris to Carriveau on foot, meeting a young rebel named Gaëtan Dubois along the way. In Carriveau, she joins the French Resistance and is initially tasked with distributing anti-Nazi propaganda.

After moving to a cell in Paris, she develops a plan to help downed Allied airmen escape to the British embassy in neutral Spain, from where they can be repatriated. She is successful, and with support from other Resistance operators (including her father, with whom she begins to rebuild a relationship) and the British MI9, this becomes her primary task throughout the war.

She earns the code name "Nightingale", and is actively hunted by the Nazis. She is eventually captured. Although her father falsely confesses to being the Nightingale to save her, she is sent to a concentration camp in Germany. She undergoes hellish conditions at the camp but survives long enough to see the end of the war. She makes her way to Vianne, and they reconcile. She reunites with Gaëtan briefly before dying from typhus and pneumonia, which she contracted at the camp.

The elderly narrator is revealed to be Vianne, who receives an invitation to an event in Paris to honor her sister, "The Nightingale". She travels with her son Julien, who has never been told about his family's activities during the war or his true father. After the event, Vianne reunites with Ari, and she comes to peace with her memories of the war.

== Inspiration ==
The characters in The Nightingale are fictional, although some of their actions are based on real historical figures. Isabelle's escape route over the Pyrenees for downed Allied airmen was based on the Comet line of 24-year-old Andrée de Jongh, a Belgian woman who helped aviators and others escape. De Jongh personally escorted many airmen over the Pyrenees on foot; by the end of the war, she had aided 118 airmen. De Jongh was captured late in the war and sent to the Ravensbrück concentration camp; the Nazis did not execute her because they did not believe that she had organized the escape route.

De Jongh survived the camp and for decades after the war. She was made a countess in 1985 and lived until 2007.

The story of De Jongh also inspired Hannah to conduct further research and found stories during the French Resistance about women who were willing to put their lives and their children at risk in order to shelter Jewish families. This material inspired her creation of the Vianne character in her book. Other historical figures mentioned include World War I nurse Edith Cavell.

== Reception ==
USA Today gave the book 3.5 stars out of four.

A review published by Kirkus Reviews notes, "[Hannah's] tendency to sentimentalize undermines the gravitas of this tale...Still, a respectful and absorbing page-turner."

The novel sold well: it spent 45 weeks on the NPR Hardcover Fiction Bestseller List and 20 weeks on the New York Times bestseller list.

== Film adaptation ==
The book was optioned in March 2015 by TriStar Pictures for screen adaptation, with Ann Peacock to write and Elizabeth Cantillon to produce. In August 2016 it was announced that Michelle MacLaren would direct and rewrite the film with John Sayles, until MacLaren left before production shutdown. On June 23, 2017, TriStar scheduled the film to be released on August 10, 2018. In December 2019, Melanie Laurent signed on to direct from a script by Dana Stevens, with Cantillon still attached to produce. Dakota and Elle Fanning would star, marking the first time the sisters have shared scenes in a film; previously they had played the same character at different ages, in separate scenes.

On March 2, 2020, TriStar pushed the film to December 25, 2020. On April 24, 2020, TriStar briefly removed the film from the release calendar due to shutdown of activities during the COVID-19 pandemic. On April 30, 2020, TriStar rescheduled the film to be released on December 22, 2021.

Initially principal photography was set to begin on October 26, 2020, with scenes to be shot in Budapest, Hungary and Los Angeles, California, but less than a week before shooting was to commence, the start of production was delayed because of the pandemic. Laurent instead focused on The Mad Women's Ball, and The Nightingale was intended to be her next film.

On February 19, 2021, TriStar pushed the film again to December 23, 2022. In September 2021, Laurent commented on the film's status and the delayed production, "It's super hard for us to find another date and to make everybody on board at the same time, so it's a mess."

In 2023, Elle Fanning expressed hope that the project would come to fruition. On July 22, 2025, it was announced that development on the film had been revived, with Michael Morris now directing the film, and TriStar scheduling it for release on February 12, 2027. Filming began on March 29, 2026 in Budapest. On July 10, 2026, TriStar pushed the film to March 19, 2027.
