= They Never Learn (novel) =

2020 novel by Layne Fargo

- First edition ebook cover
- Author: Layne Fargo
- Language: English
- Genre: Thriller
- Publisher: Gallery/Scout Press
- Publication date: October 13, 2020
- Publication place: United States
- Pages: 352
- ISBN: 9781982132040

They Never Learn is a thriller novel by American author Layne Fargo. It was published by Gallery/Scout Press on October 13, 2020. The audiobook is narrated by Lameece Issaq and Eileen Stevens. The novel has two parallel storylines, with one storyline following Scarlett Clark, an English professor who kills abusive men, and the other following Carly Schiller, a college freshman obsessed with enacting vengeance against her roommate's assaulter. Fargo was inspired to write the novel during the Brett Kavanaugh hearings.

== Background ==
The novel was inspired by a tweet by Fargo's friend that read "I wish we could write a book together where there was one adult, and one YA protagonist." She came up with the idea for the novel during the first week of the Brett Kavanaugh hearings.

== Synopsis ==
Scarlett Clark is an English professor at Gorman University where she studies forgotten female writers and teaches undergraduates. For the past sixteen years she has spent her free time killing men who have raped or abused women, while staging their deaths as accidents or suicide. When she poisons a star football player and stages his death as a suicide, doubt surfaces that he was really suicidal, and Dr. Samina Pierce, the head of the psychology department, begins looking for patterns in the past deaths. She forms a team to investigate, and, in an effort to not get caught, Scarlett joins the team. The increased scrutiny, however, does not deter Scarlett from planning another murder, this time against her department head, who has a reputation for seducing students and is after the fellowship she wants.

Carly Schiller is a freshman who has just escaped from her emotionally abusive father. She ends up falling in love with her roommate, Allison Hadley, who is traumatized from growing up in a religious family that shamed her for being bisexual. She witnesses Allison get sexually assaulted, and becomes obsessed with enacting revenge against the attacker, Sebastian Waller.

== Reception ==
Kirkus Reviews criticized the novel for "equating revenge to justice" and called Scarlett a "sociopath." Oline H. Cogdill of Shelf Awareness, however, said that Scarlett remains "empathetic" even when her vigilant nature crosses into overt violence. Publishers Weekly called it "a scathing take-down of campus rape culture", but described the setup as "contrived" and several characters as "lack[ing] depth".
