= Gail Honeyman =

Scottish novelist

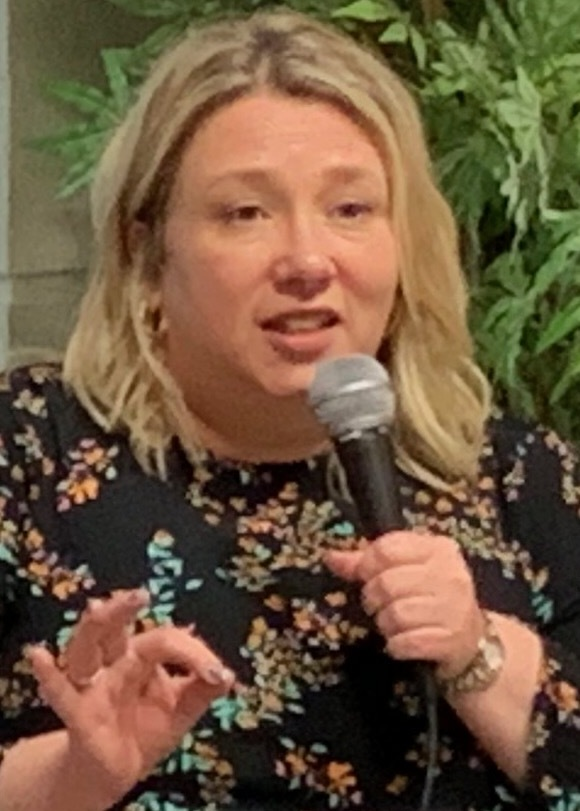
- Honeyman in 2019
- Born: 1972 (age 53–54); Stirling, Scotland
- Education: University of Glasgow; University of Oxford
- Occupations: Writer, novelist, university administrator
- Writing career
- Language: English
- Notable work: Eleanor Oliphant Is Completely Fine (2017)
- Notable awards: Costa Book Award–First Novel (2017)

Gail Honeyman (born 1972) is a Scottish writer whose debut novel, Eleanor Oliphant Is Completely Fine, won the 2017 Costa First Novel Award.

== Biography ==
Born and raised in Stirling in central Scotland to a mother who worked as a civil servant and a father in science, Honeyman was a voracious reader in her childhood, visiting the library "a ridiculous number of times a week".

She studied French language and literature at the University of Glasgow before continuing her education at the University of Oxford with a postgraduate course in French poetry. However, she decided that an academic career was not for her and started a string of "backroom jobs", first as a civil servant in economic development and then as an administrator at the University of Glasgow.

While working as an administrator, Honeyman enrolled in a Faber Academy writing course, submitting the first three chapters of what would become Eleanor Oliphant Is Completely Fine to a competition for unpublished fiction by female writers, run by Lucy Cavendish College, Cambridge. The novel, published in 2017, went on to earn numerous awards and wide critical acclaim.

== Books ==
Eleanor Oliphant Is Completely Fine won the 2017 Costa First Novel Award, and since then Honeyman has been interviewed often, including by The Guardian, The Daily Telegraph and Waterstones. Of her relationship with the book's titular character she told The Daily Telegraph: "Eleanor Oliphant isn't me, or anyone I know [but] of course I've felt loneliness – everybody does".

In January 2018, Honeyman said she was working on a new novel, "set in a different period and location." A book with the acting title Gail Honeyman Untitled Book 2 (Harper Collins, ISBN 9780008172169) has been listed with publication date 12 September 2024 or 27 February 2025; as of April 2026 it is listed for 10 February 2028.

== Awards ==
Year	Work	Award	Category	Result	Ref
2017	Eleanor Oliphant Is Completely Fine	Books Are My Bag Readers' Awards	Popular Fiction	Shortlisted	
2017	Eleanor Oliphant Is Completely Fine	Costa Book Awards	First Novel	Won	
2017	Eleanor Oliphant Is Completely Fine	Waverton Good Read Award	—	Won	
2018	Eleanor Oliphant Is Completely Fine	Audie Award	Fiction	Finalist	
2018	Eleanor Oliphant Is Completely Fine	Australian Book Industry Awards	International Book	Shortlisted	
2018	Eleanor Oliphant Is Completely Fine	Authors' Club First Novel Award	—	Won	
2018	Eleanor Oliphant Is Completely Fine	Books Are My Bag Readers' Awards	Readers' Choice	Won	
2018	Eleanor Oliphant Is Completely Fine	British Book Award	Début Book of the Year	Won	
2018	Eleanor Oliphant Is Completely Fine	The British Book Industry Awards	Overall	Won	
2018	Eleanor Oliphant Is Completely Fine	The British Book Industry Awards	Début Book of the Year	Won	
2018	Eleanor Oliphant Is Completely Fine	Desmond Elliott Prize	—	Shortlisted	
2018	Eleanor Oliphant Is Completely Fine	Goldsboro Books Glass Bell Award	—	Shortlisted	
2018	Eleanor Oliphant Is Completely Fine	Independent Booksellers' Book Prize	—	Shortlisted	
2018	Eleanor Oliphant Is Completely Fine	RUSA CODES Reading List	Women's Fiction	Shortlisted	
2019	Eleanor Oliphant Is Completely Fine	Comedy Women in Print Prize	Published Comedy Novel	Shortlisted	
2019	Eleanor Oliphant Is Completely Fine	International Dublin Literary Award	—	Longlisted	

== Bibliography ==
- —— (2017). Eleanor Oliphant Is Completely Fine. HarperCollins. ISBN 9780008172114.
- —— (2025). Untitled Book 2. HarperCollins. ISBN 9780008172169. Forthcoming.
