= Book of the Month =

Subscription-based book buying club

Book of the Month LLC
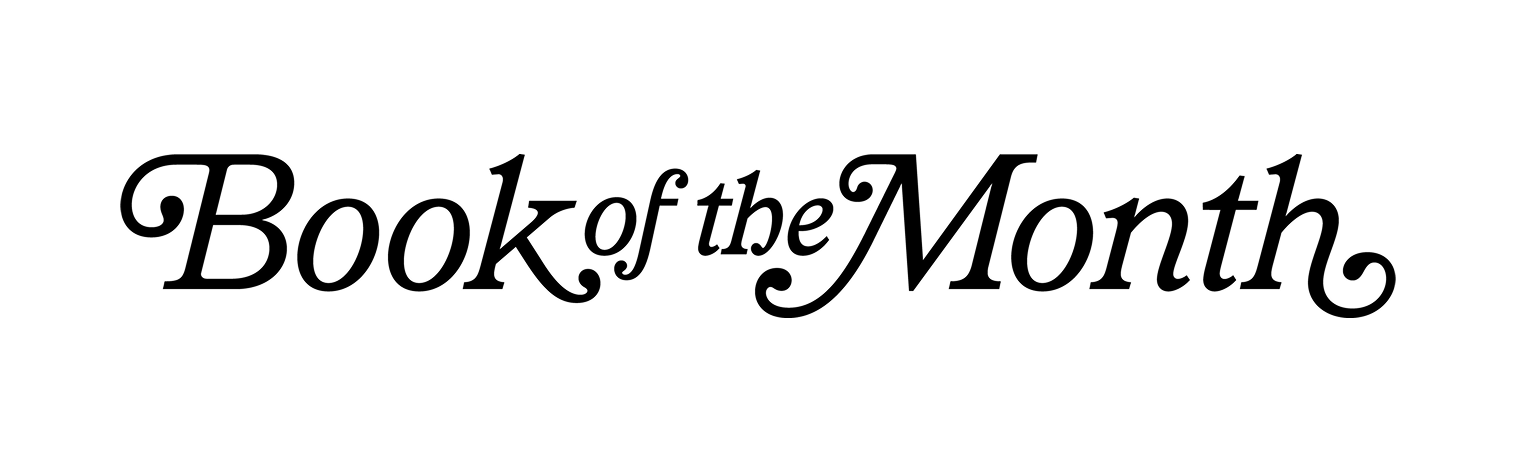
- Type: subsidiary
- Industry: E-commerce; Publishing; Subscription service
- Founded: 1926; 100 years ago in New York City, New York, U.S.
- Founder: Harry Scherman
- Headquarters: New York City, U.S.
- Key people: John Lippman (Executive Chairman); Blake Orlandi (CEO); Cris Vergara (CTO)
- Parent: Pride Tree Holdings
- Website: www.bookofthemonth.com

Book of the Month (founded 1926) often abbreviated BOTM or BOMC, is a United States subscription-based e-commerce service that offers a selection of five to seven new hardcover books each month to its subscribers. The company refers to itself as a "club", and its subscribers as "members", and is often called by its trademark Book of the Month Club.

Books are selected and endorsed by a panel of judges, and members choose which book they would like to receive, similar to how the club originally operated when it began in 1926. Members can also discuss the books with fellow members in an online forum.

In late 2015, in concert with the club's 90th year, the club announced a relaunch into its current iteration. Within two years, the club had grown its membership to more than 100,000 members, primarily Millennial and Gen Z women, and the club's presence on social media grew to over 1.5 million Instagram followers. In 2025, Fast Company Magazine reported the business had grown to over 400,000 members.

Approximately 75% of the club's titles are by up-and-coming authors, and 80% of titles are fiction. The club has also worked with a series of celebrity guest judges who bring broader awareness to new titles, and continues producing its own versions of books that feature special endpapers and casings. In 2016, the club launched a Book of the Year award. In 2017, the club debuted its first ever television advertisement called "Monthly".

The club has a tradition of focusing on debut and emerging writers, and is known for having helped launch the careers of some of the most acclaimed authors in American literary history. In 1926 (its first year in operation), the Club's first selection was Lolly Willowes by Sylvia Townsend Warner. It also featured, but did not select, Ernest Hemingway's The Sun Also Rises in the Book of the Month News. In 1936, (its tenth year), the Club selected Gone with the Wind by unknown author Margaret Mitchell. Mitchell wrote: "I wanted to thank [Book of the Month] from the bottom of my heart for selecting my book. It was quite the most exciting and unexpected thing that ever happened to me." John Steinbeck's Of Mice and Men was selected the following year in 1937. In 1951 (its 25th year), the club distributed its 100 millionth book and selected J. D. Salinger's The Catcher in the Rye, which became both the most-censored and the most-taught book in America. In 1978, the Club selected By the Rivers of Babylon, the first book by Nelson DeMille, who later wrote: "I will be forever grateful to Book of the Month for ensuring that my first book, By the Rivers of Babylon, was not my last. When the Club selected Babylon in 1978, it reached hundreds of thousands of additional readers and became an instant best-seller."

== History ==
Harry Scherman was a copywriter for the J. Walter Thompson advertising agency in 1916 when he set out to create the Little Leather Library. With his partners Max Sackheim, and Charles and Albert Boni, Scherman began a mail order service that offered "30 Great Books For $2.98" (miniature reprints "bound in limp Redcroft") and sold 40 million copies in its first five years. Sackheim and Scherman then founded their own ad agency devoted entirely to marketing books.

The problems of building interest in a new book led Scherman to create, along with Sackheim and Robert Haas (son of Kalman Haas), the Book-of-the-Month Club in 1926. As Scherman explained it, the club itself would be a "standard brand". "It establishes itself as a sound selector of good books and sells by means of its own prestige. The Club employed tens of readers and reviewers after its original founding, including literary reviewer Amy Loveman. In terms of the review process, "the prestige of each new title need not be built up before becoming acceptable," he explained later. After starting with 4,000 subscribers, the club had more than 550,000 within twenty years. Being a "Book of the Month Club" selection was used to promote books to the general public.

Book of the Month Club was acquired by Time Inc. in 1977; Time Inc. merged with Warner Communications in 1989. The original judges panel was eliminated in 1994. In 2000, the Book-of-the-Month Club, Inc. merged with Doubleday Direct, Inc. The resulting company, Bookspan, was a joint venture between Time Warner and Bertelsmann until 2007 when Bertelsmann took over complete ownership. In 2008, Bertelsmann sold its US subscription business to the private equity firm Najafi Companies. In 2013, Najafi sold Bookspan to the current parent company Pride Tree Holdings, Inc.

After relaunching in 2015, under CEO John Lippman, BOTM had revenues of $10 million in 2017; in 2024, industry sources estimate revenues of $50 million.

== Membership terms ==
The club operates a subscription program, similar to other box subscription services, where customers select a membership plan for a set period of time (three, six, or twelve months) and books are shipped to members during the first seven days of the month.

When the club operated through the mail, it sent a monthly brochure, The Book-of-the-Month Club News, to subscribers, offering a Main Selection and Alternates. The subscriber could choose among these through a reply card; if they did not reply, they were shipped the Main Selection – a "negative response" system.

== Book of the Year Award ==
In late 2016, the club announced its first annual Book of the Year Award, the finalists for which are chosen by the club's members. The award is called the "Lolly", in tribute to Lolly Willowes, the first book selected by the club back in 1926. Lolly Willowes was written by Sylvia Townsend Warner, who later went on to become a prolific writer and even wrote short stories for The New Yorker.

In 2017, the award added a $10,000 prize, and the winner was The Heart's Invisible Furies by Irish author John Boyne. In 2018, the members voted Circe by Madeline Miller as best book of the year. In 2019, the members voted Daisy Jones & The Six by Taylor Jenkins Reid as best book of the year. In 2020, the members voted The Vanishing Half by Brit Bennett as best book of the year.

=== Winners by Year ===
2016: Bryn Greenwood – All the Ugly and Wonderful Things

- Paul Kalanithi – When Breath Becomes Air
- Ruth Ware – The Woman in Cabin 10
- Blake Crouch – Dark Matter
- Amor Towles – A Gentleman in Moscow

2017: John Boyne – The Heart's Invisible Furies

- Taylor Jenkins Reid – The Seven Husbands of Evelyn Hugo
- Jesmyn Ward – Sing, Unburied, Sing
- Celeste Ng – Little Fires Everywhere
- Ruth Emmie Lang – Beasts of Extraordinary Circumstances

2018: Madeline Miller – Circe

- Tayari Jones – An American Marriage
- Helen Hoang – The Kiss Quotient
- Kristin Hannah – The Great Alone
- A. J. Finn – The Woman in the Window

2019: Taylor Jenkins Reid – Daisy Jones & the Six

- Blake Crouch – Recursion
- Etaf Rum – A Woman is No Man
- William Kent Krueger – This Tender Land
- Alex Michaelides – The Silent Patient

2020: Brit Bennett – The Vanishing Half

- Abi Daré – The Girl with the Louding Voice
- Lucy Foley – The Guest List
- Fredrik Backman – Anxious People
- V. E. Schwab – The Invisible Life of Addie LaRue

2021: Kristin Hannah – The Four Winds

- Taylor Jenkins Reid – Malibu Rising
- Emily Henry – People We Meet on Vacation
- S. A. Cosby – Razorblade Tears
- Sarah Penner – The Lost Apothecary

2022: Gabrielle Zevin – Tomorrow, and Tomorrow, and Tomorrow

- Stacy Willingham – A Flicker in the Dark
- Charmaine Wilkerson – Black Cake
- Amor Towles – The Lincoln Highway
- Ali Hazelwood – The Love Hypothesis

2023: Abby Jimenez – Yours Truly

- Lisa Jewell – None of this Is True
- Emily Habeck – Shark Heart
- Emilia Hart – Weyward
- Meg Shaffer – The Wishing Game

2024 : Liz Moore – The God of the Woods

- Alison Espach – The Wedding People
- Kristin Hannah – The Women
- Marjan Kamali – The Lion Women of Tehran
- Kaylie Smith – Phantasma

2025 : Charlotte McConaghy – Wild Dark Shores

- V. E. Schwab – Bury Our Bones in the Midnight Soil
- Layne Fargo – The Favorites
- B. K. Borison – First-Time Caller
- Florence Knapp – The Names
