= Atmosphere (novel) =

2025 novel by Taylor Jenkins Reid

- Author: Taylor Jenkins Reid
- Genre: Romance
- Set in: 1980s Houston, Texas
- Publisher: Ballantine Books
- Publication date: June 3, 2025
- ISBN: 978-0593158715

Atmosphere is a 2025 historical fiction romance novel by Taylor Jenkins Reid. The book centers on Joan Goodwin, a fictional astronaut in NASA's Space Shuttle program in the early 1980s, and her ability to juggle family, romance, and the demands of her new job.

== Process ==
Taylor Jenkins Reid is an American author who published her first novel in 2013. Atmosphere is her ninth novel. From 2017 to 2022, she published The Seven Husbands of Evelyn Hugo, Daisy Jones & the Six, Malibu Rising, and Carrie Soto Is Back, which are set in the same universe and together sometimes referred to as the "famous-women quartet". These four novels became bestsellers, aided by word of mouth (Evelyn Hugo went viral on BookTok in 2021, for instance). After Carrie Soto was published in 2022, Reid took a break from writing.

For her next book, Reid sought to write one unlike her earlier works, which largely follow famous women living in California. She conducted extensive research into the space program, spending months living in Houston as part of this research. When asked in an interview why she included a lesbian love story, she replied, "Because there are a lot of different sides to me and it felt like, creatively, it was time to indulge this one. And also, because no one is going to tell me that love isn't love." Atmosphere was released on June 3, 2025, published by Ballantine Books.

== Plot ==
The novel begins on December 29, 1984, when a malfunction on the fictional NASA space shuttle Navigator leaves three of the five astronauts aboard dead and one more unconscious with only hours to live due to contracting the bends. Only Vanessa Ford is conscious and able to communicate with mission control, where fellow astronaut and spacecraft communicator (CAPCOM) Joan Goodwin attempts to help her land safely back on earth.

The subsequent chapters primarily focus on the life of Joan in the years prior to the disaster, told from a third-person limited point of view. Joan, a professor of astronomy at Rice University, applies to and is accepted to NASA's Space Shuttle program beginning in 1980. She bonds with most of her class, but particularly takes a liking to Vanessa. After over a year of flirtation (and reticence to act on Joan's end), the two profess their love for each other and start a relationship but are forced to keep it secret due to concerns that rampant homophobia would end their careers at NASA.

Joan additionally has to balance her work with her relationship with her sister, Barbara, and her niece, Frances. Barbara is an unreliable mother and consistently pressures Joan into help with her parental duties, though Joan loves Frances like a daughter of her own and cherishes spending time with her. The relationship is further strained when Barbara marries Daniel, who has a difficult time connecting with Frances. Barbara eventually sends Frances to a boarding school in Dallas, angering Joan.

Joan and Vanessa are both selected to go on space shuttle launches about a month apart in late 1984. Joan struggles with space adaptation syndrome on her trip and resolves that she wants to stay on Earth as part of mission control going forward. After she returns to Houston, Barbara admits that she and Daniel are planning to move to Europe, mostly cutting the now-10-year-old Frances out of her life; an enraged Joan effectively adopts Frances as her own child. Meanwhile, Joan's supervisor at NASA hints to her that he is aware of her and Vanessa's relationship, suggesting that continuing it will likely end both of their careers. The day before Vanessa leaves for her launch, Joan attempts to break up with her out of concern for Vanessa's career and her need to be a parent to Frances, but Vanessa refuses to accept it and they agree to deal with whatever happens next.

Back on the damaged space shuttle, Vanessa is unable to latch one of the doors completely shut. Against mission control's orders and at increased risk to her own life, she demands to begin deorbiting without the door latched in an effort to get the other living astronaut on board back to Earth in time to save her life. Before she attempts to re-enter the Earth's atmosphere, Vanessa and Joan share a heartfelt conversation over the communication system, all but outing their relationship to everyone listening. When mission control cannot initially get a hold of Vanessa following her descent, Joan believes she is dead and begins to reflect on their time together, only to hear Vanessa's voice confirming that she has survived re-entry.

== Reception ==
Atmosphere was widely anticipated. Book Riot deemed it "the biggest book of the summer." Users on Goodreads voted it the top book to read in summer 2025. The novel was Good Morning America’s pick for their book club in June 2025, and appeared on at least five media "best books of 2025" rankings.

Emily Martin in Book Riot felt that the book met the high expectations set for it and that it was Reid's best novel yet. Lucy Scholes, writing in the Financial Times, opined that Atmosphere was not high-quality "literary fiction," but felt that the plot, characters, and story were "exactly" what made her a bestseller. Various reviewers praised Reid's characterization and storytelling; Cory Oldweiler in the Minnesota Star Tribune felt the central love story in particular was "tender and well-crafted."

Oldweiler criticized the choice to begin with a disaster, feeling that its outcome was too obvious to build any "narrative tension." Scholes felt that the novel did not always engage on a deep level with the historical context, and arguing that Reid's message in response to intolerance faced by Ford and Goodwin for their lesbian relationship is that "love really can overcome all." Scholes concluded that the novel was "all rather saccharine, sanitised and oversimplified." The Times' reviewer felt that Joan was too nice to be fully likable, and that progressive messaging was so explicit as to impede the work's readability, resulting in a book that lacked substance and fun.

== Film adaptation ==
In June 2025, Laika Studios' live-action division announced that they had hired Anna Boden and Ryan Fleck to write and direct a film adaptation of the novel while producing alongside Travis Knight, Matt Levin, Reid, and Brad Mendelson. In September 2026, Black Bear Pictures boarded the project as co-financier and worldwide distributor.
