= Music of Daisy Jones & the Six =

The music to the 2023 Amazon Prime Video streaming television series Daisy Jones & the Six features original music produced by Blake Mills, with the contributions from fellow musicians Phoebe Bridgers, Chris Weisman, Marcus Mumford, Taylor Goldsmith and Tony Berg amongst others and lead vocals performed by the lead cast Riley Keough and Sam Claflin. Several classical songs from the 1970s were selected by music supervisor Frankie Pine to be used in the series, while the incidental music is underscored by British musician Tom Howe.

11 tracks that were originally written for the series have been compiled into a promotional studio album entitled Aurora, the fictional album that was featured in the novel. It was released on March 1, 2023, by Atlantic Records, led by two promotional singles. Other original songs were released separately, with those being combined with that of Aurora, into separate extended plays released during the course of the series' premiere from March 3–24.

== Background ==
Music was an integral part of the show and the novel. Taylor Jenkins Reid, the showrunner, recruited American musician Blake Mills to produce the album, along with fellow record producer Phoebe Bridgers and singer-songwriter Chris Weisman. As Reid felt she was not a musician, said "I hear something in my head, but it's not anything that anyone could make into a song. So the idea that people are going to create this album is incredibly exciting to me." The cast members had to rehearse singing during the COVID-19 pandemic lockdown to get into the characters, as the fictional band was portrayed as a homage to the 1970s band Fleetwood Mac. Mills felt it as an opportunity to subvert and create a guitar personality which was present in the 1970s, to replicate the authentic music of that era.

Tony Berg, who co-produced the soundtrack, said that on the challenges he had on rewriting the 1970s rock sound into an album with a much younger fanbase, saying that: "When you work with singers at the professional level, the microcosm of a band amplifies everything. Take what The Beatles did from ’63 to ’70. They made the Earth spin the other way around. It was hard to do without sampling or copying seventies musicians, but this album resonates with an 18-year-old all the way up to a 60- or 80-year-old."

== Writing and recording ==
Mills and Tony Berg worked on 24 original songs created for the series, which took over three years to write. Berg spent over three months in the writing room, discussing with Mills how to edit the scenes to songs without making it a musical. The songs were written by Bridgers, Mills, and Berg's daughter, musician Z Berg, while also featuring collaborations with Marcus Mumford, Taylor Goldsmith, Chris Weisman, Cass McCombs, Matt Sweeney, Bobby and Ethan Gruska of The Belle Brigade.

To gain more exposure to the songwriting process, Riley Keough and Sam Claflin were brought in during the writing of "Let Me Down Easy" which was called as a "joyous experience" due to the mutual relationships. He added "My most salient recollections are recording vocals with Sam and Riley and just watching them grow as musicians. When producing these music sessions, we always made sure to have the context and immersion in the plot as well as their character development At the end of Episode 5 when they record “Let Me Down Easy” in the studio, it was magic, and that's really how this stuff works."

== Aurora ==
Aurora is the promotional studio album released by Atlantic Records, which is also the fictional album recorded by the band in the novel. The album had 11 original songs produced by Blake Mills and featured lead vocals by Riley Keough and Sam Claflin, which was officially announced on January 25, 2023, and was led by two singles – "Regret Me" and "Look At Us Now (Honeycomb)". The album was intended to release along with the show on March 3, 2023, but instead released two days earlier and was published into physical form as vinyl records on March 2.

== Extended plays ==
The songs featured in each episode were released as extended plays after airing. On March 2, the first EP for "Track 1: Come and Get It" was released, along with EPs for the other two episodes the following day. Subsequent EPs were released after each episodes aired until the concluding episode on March 24.

Title	Format	Length	U.S. release date	Label	Ref.
Track 1: Come and Get It	Digital download	23:23	March 2, 2023	Ellemar Records; Atlantic Records	
Track 2: I'll Take You There	Digital download	29:34	March 3, 2023	Ellemar Records; Atlantic Records	
Track 3: Someone Saved My Life Tonight	Digital download	29:24	March 3, 2023	Ellemar Records; Atlantic Records	
Track 4: I Saw The Light	Digital download	19:51	March 10, 2023	Ellemar Records; Atlantic Records	
Track 5: Fire	Digital download	11:30	March 10, 2023	Ellemar Records; Atlantic Records	
Track 6: Whatever Gets You Thru The Night	Digital download	31:17	March 10, 2023	Ellemar Records; Atlantic Records	
Track 7: She's Gone	Digital download	19:14	March 17, 2023	Ellemar Records; Atlantic Records	
Track 8: Looks Like We Made It	Digital download	29:03	March 17, 2023	Ellemar Records; Atlantic Records	
Track 9: Feels Like the First Time	Digital download	29:30	March 24, 2023	Ellemar Records; Atlantic Records	
Track 10: Rock 'n' Roll Suicide	Digital download	36:36	March 24, 2023	Ellemar Records; Atlantic Records	

=== Track listing ===
All tracks are produced by Blake Mills.

==== Track 1: Come and Get It ====
No.	Title	Writer(s)	Performer(s)/Artist(s)	Length
1.	"Let Me Down Easy (Note: Previously featured in Aurora)"	Blake Mills, Z Berg, Ali Tamposi and James Valentine	Riley Keough, Sam Claflin and Z Berg	03:23
2.	"Look at Us Now (Honeycomb)"	Blake Mills, Jason Boesel, Stephony Smith, Jonathan Rice and Marcus Mumford	Sam Claflin, Riley Keough, Blake Mills and Madison Cunningham	05:32
3.	"Susie Q"	Dale Hawkins, Robert Chaisson, Stan Lewis and Eleanor Broadwater	Sam Claflin and Will Harrison	02:54
4.	"Have Love, Will Travel"	Richard Berry	Sam Claflin and Will Harrison	02:48
5.	"Stumbled on Sublime"	Blake Mills	Wyatt Stone	02:35
6.	"Over/Under"	Blake Mills	The Winters	03:26
7.	"By Myself"	Blake Mills	Riley Keough	02:45
Total length:				23:23

==== Track 2: I'll Take You There ====
No.	Title	Writer(s)	Performer(s)/Artist(s)	Length
1.	"Look Me in the Eye"	Blake Mills	Sam Claflin and Will Harrison	03:45
2.	"Flip the Switch"	Blake Mills	Sam Claflin and Will Harrison	03:57
3.	"A Song for You"	Leon Russell	Nabiyah Be	03:24
4.	"Two Against Three"	Blake Mills	Riley Keough	03:51
5.	"Silver Nail"	Blake Mills	Sam Claflin, James Petralli and Nicki Bluhm	05:56
6.	"Let Me Down Easy"	Blake Mills, Z Berg, Ali Tamposi, James Valentine	Riley Keough, Sam Claflin and Z Berg	03:23
7.	"Nobody Needs"	Blake Mills	Riley Keough	05:18
Total length:				29:34

==== Track 3: Someone Saved My Life Tonight ====
No.	Title	Writer(s)	Performer(s)/Artist(s)	Length
1.	"Look Me in the Eye (Note: Used in "Track 2: I'll Take You There")"	Blake Mills	Sam Claflin and Will Harrison	03:45
2.	"Nobody Needs"	Blake Mills	Riley Keough	05:18
3.	"Let Me Down Easy"	Blake Mills, Z Berg, Ali Tamposi, James Valentine	Riley Keough, Sam Claflin and Z Berg	03:23
4.	"Stumbled on Sublime (Note: Used in "Track 1: Come and Get It")"	Blake Mills	Wyatt Stone	02:35
5.	"Flip the Switch"	Blake Mills	Sam Claflin and Will Harrison	03:57
6.	"The River"	Blake Mills, Z Berg, Joe Keefe and Kayslee Collins	Riley Keough, Sam Claflin, Blake Mills and Z Berg	04:54
7.	"Look at Us Now (Honeycomb)"	Blake Mills, Jason Boesel, Stephony Smith, Jonathan Rice and Marcus Mumford	Sam Claflin, Riley Keough, Blake Mills and Madison Cunningham	05:32
Total length:				29:24

==== Track 4: I Saw The Light ====
No.	Title	Writer(s)	Performer(s)/Artist(s)	Length
1.	"Look at Us Now (Honeycomb)"	Blake Mills, Jason Boesel, Stephony Smith, Jonathan Rice and Marcus Mumford	Sam Claflin, Riley Keough Blake Mills and Madison Cunningham	05:32
2.	"Flip the Switch"	Blake Mills	Sam Claflin and Will Harrison	03:57
3.	"Look Me in the Eye"	Blake Mills	Sam Claflin and Will Harrison	03:45
4.	"Type of Guy"	Blake Mills, Phoebe Bridgers	Riley Keough	03:13
5.	"Up To You"	Blake Mills	Nabiyah Be	03:24
Total length:				19:51

==== Track 5: Fire ====
No.	Title	Writer(s)	Performer(s)/Artist(s)	Length
1.	"Look at Us Now (Honeycomb)"	Blake Mills, Jason Boesel, Stephony Smith, Jonathan Rice and Marcus Mumford	Sam Claflin, Riley Keough, Blake Mills and Madison Cunningham	05:32
2.	"Stumbled on Sublime"	Blake Mills	Wyatt Stone	02:35
3.	"Let Me Down Easy"	Blake Mills, Z Berg, Ali Tamposi, James Valentine	Riley Keough, Sam Claflin and Z Berg	03:23
Total length:				11:30

==== Track 6: Whatever Gets You Thru The Night ====
No.	Title	Writer(s)	Performer(s)/Artist(s)	Length
1.	"Flip the Switch"	Blake Mills	Sam Claflin and Will Harrison	03:57
2.	"Kill You to Try"	Blake Mills, Barbara Gruska and Ethan Gruska	Riley Keough, Sam Claflin, James Petralli and Nicki Bluhm	05:12
3.	"No Words"	Blake Mills	Riley Keough and Sam Claflin; Background vocals: James Petralli and Nicki Bluhm	04:16
4.	"More Fun to Miss"	Blake Mills and Matt Sweeney	Riley Keough and Sam Claflin	02:53
5.	"Aurora"	Blake Mills, Chris Weisman, Cass McCombs and Matt Sweeney	Riley Keough and Sam Claflin	03:25
6.	"Please"	Blake Mills and Chris Wiesman	Sam Claflin; Background vocals: James Petralli and Nicki Bluhm	03:24
7.	"The River"	Blake Mills, Z Berg, Joe Keefe and Kayslee Collins	Riley Keough and Sam Claflin; Background vocals: Blake Mills and Z Berg	04:54
8.	"Regret Me"	Blake Mills and Chris Weisman	Riley Keough and Sam Claflin; Background vocals: Nicki Bluhm and James Petralli	03:16
Total length:				31:17

==== Track 7: She's Gone ====
No.	Title	Writer(s)	Performer(s)/Artist(s)	Length
1.	"Up To You (Note: Used in "Track 4: I Saw The Light")"	Blake Mills	Nabiyah Be	03:24
2.	"More Fun to Miss"	Blake Mills and Matt Sweeney	Riley Keough and Sam Claflin	02:53
3.	"Ya Love Ain’t Enough"	Blake Mills, David Longstreth	Nabiyah Be	03:23
4.	"Last Night Together"	Blake Mills	Nabiyah Be	06:18
5.	"Regret Me"	Blake Mills and Chris Weisman	Riley Keough and Sam Claflin; Background vocals: Nicki Bluhm and James Petralli	03:16
Total length:				19:14

==== Track 8: Looks Like We Made It ====
No.	Title	Writer(s)	Performer(s)/Artist(s)	Length
1.	"More Fun to Miss"	Blake Mills and Matt Sweeney	Riley Keough and Sam Claflin	02:53
2.	"Look at Us Now (Honeycomb)"	Blake Mills, Jason Boesel, Stephony Smith, Jonathan Rice and Marcus Mumford	Sam Claflin, Riley Keough, Blake Mills and Madison Cunningham	05:32
3.	"Kill You to Try"	Blake Mills, Barbara Gruska and Ethan Gruska	Riley Keough, Sam Claflin, James Petralli and Nicki Bluhm	05:12
4.	"The River"	Blake Mills, Z Berg, Joe Keefe and Kayslee Collins	Riley Keough and Sam Claflin; Background vocals: Blake Mills and Z Berg	04:54
5.	"Aurora"	Blake Mills, Chris Weisman, Cass McCombs and Matt Sweeney	Riley Keough and Sam Claflin	03:25
6.	"Two Against Three"	Blake Mills	Riley Keough	03:51
7.	"Regret Me"	Blake Mills and Chris Weisman	Riley Keough and Sam Claflin; Background vocals: Nicki Bluhm and James Petralli	03:16
Total length:				29:03

==== Track 9: Feels Like the First Time ====
No.	Title	Writer(s)	Performer(s)/Artist(s)	Length
1.	"Regret Me"	Blake Mills and Chris Weisman	Riley Keough and Sam Claflin; Background vocals: Nicki Bluhm and James Petralli	03:16
2.	"You Were Gone"	Blake Mills and Chris Weisman	Riley Keough and Sam Claflin; Background vocals: James Petralli and Z Berg	04:18
3.	"Kill You to Try"	Blake Mills, Barbara Gruska and Ethan Gruska	Riley Keough, Sam Claflin, James Petralli and Nicki Bluhm	05:12
4.	"The Nihilistic Denialist"	Blake Mills	Rut Canal	02:27
5.	"Aurora"	Blake Mills, Chris Weisman, Cass McCombs and Matt Sweeney	Riley Keough and Sam Claflin	03:25
6.	"Two Against Three"	Blake Mills	Riley Keough	03:51
7.	"It Was Always You"	Blake Mills, Z Berg	Riley Keough	03:39
8.	"Aurora" (Live from Saturday Night Live)	Blake Mills, Chris Weisman, Cass McCombs and Matt Sweeney	Riley Keough and Sam Claflin	03:22
Total length:				29:30

==== Track 10: Rock 'n' Roll Suicide ====
No.	Title	Writer(s)	Performer(s)/Artist(s)	Length
1.	"More Fun to Miss"	Blake Mills and Matt Sweeney	Riley Keough and Sam Claflin	02:53
2.	"Regret Me"	Blake Mills and Chris Weisman	Riley Keough and Sam Claflin; Background vocals: Nicki Bluhm and James Petralli	03:16
3.	"Kill You to Try"	Blake Mills, Barbara Gruska and Ethan Gruska	Riley Keough, Sam Claflin, James Petralli and Nicki Bluhm	05:12
4.	"No Words"	Blake Mills	Riley Keough and Sam Claflin; Background vocals: James Petralli and Nicki Bluhm	04:16
5.	"Look Me in the Eye"	Blake Mills	Sam Claflin and Will Harrison	03:45
6.	"Let Me Down Easy"	Blake Mills, Z Berg, Ali Tamposi, James Valentine	Riley Keough, Sam Claflin and Z Berg	03:23
7.	"The River"	Blake Mills, Z Berg, Joe Keefe and Kayslee Collins	Riley Keough and Sam Claflin; Background vocals: Blake Mills and Z Berg	04:54
8.	"Aurora"	Blake Mills, Chris Weisman, Cass McCombs and Matt Sweeney	Riley Keough and Sam Claflin	03:25
9.	"Look at Us Now (Honeycomb)"	Blake Mills, Jason Boesel, Stephony Smith, Jonathan Rice and Marcus Mumford	Riley Keough, Sam Claflin, Blake Mills and Madison Cunningham	05:32
Total length:				36:36

== "Special Gift for Our Fans" ==
An album entitled "Special Gift For Our Fans" was released as a single on March 31, 2023, a week after the series' finale.

No.	Title	Writer(s)	Performer(s)/Artist(s)	Length
1.	"It Was Always You (Note: Used in "Track 9: Feels Like the First Time")"	Blake Mills, Z Berg	Riley Keough	03:39
2.	"Aurora" (Live from Saturday Night Live)	Blake Mills, Chris Weisman, Cass McCombs and Matt Sweeney	Riley Keough and Sam Claflin	03:22
3.	"Look at Us Now (Honeycomb)"	Blake Mills, Jason Boesel, Stephony Smith, Jonathan Rice and Marcus Mumford	Sam Claflin, Blake Mills and Madison Cunningham	05:32
Total length:				12:33

== Original score ==
The original score for the series is composed by Tom Howe, which was released as Daisy Jones & the Six (Prime Video Original Series Soundtrack) on May 10, 2023 by Lakeshore Records.

Daisy Jones & the Six (Prime Video Original Series Soundtrack)
No.	Title	Length
1.	"Together"	1:33
2.	"Wouldn’t Survive Her"	2:14
3.	"Go for a Drive"	3:04
4.	"Daisy Soothes Baby"	1:40
5.	"What Would You Do With It?"	1:47
6.	"I'm Not Broken"	2:21
7.	"Complicated"	2:02
8.	"Swimming"	1:51
9.	"Right Person, Right Time"	2:11
10.	"Surfing"	1:35
11.	"Pursue Dreams"	2:23
12.	"The Moment It Became Real"	2:03
13.	"Saw the Light"	2:18
14.	"Nothing Without Trust"	2:47
15.	"Simone in New York"	2:57
16.	"Remember"	4:03
17.	"Camilla Misses Billie"	3:35
18.	"Stay Here Tonight"	2:49
19.	"Should Have Known Better"	3:06
20.	"Some Moms Are Toxic"	2:41

== Additional songs not featured in the album ==
The songs that are played in the series, but not included in the album are listed below:

Track 1: Come and Get It

- "I Sit and Cry" by Violet Hall
- "Incense and Peppermints" by Strawberry Alarm Clock
- "Goin' Back" by the Byrds
- "House of the Rising Sun" by the Animals (covered by the Dunne Brothers)
- "3/5 of a Mile in 10 Seconds" by Jefferson Airplane
- "Jazel Jane" by Blue Ash
- "Bang a Gong (Get It On)" by T. Rex
- "Last Time Round" by John Vella
- "Want You to Stay" by Richard Lloyd
- "Different Drum" by the Stone Poneys
- "Revolution" by Kublai Khan
- "Goin' Back" by Carole King
- "I Feel the Earth Move" by Carole King

Track 2: I'll Take You There

- "Trouble No More" by the Allman Brothers Band
- "Closer to Home (I'm Your Captain)" by Grand Funk Railroad
- "Playing with Fire" by Jay Ramsey
- "Second Time for Me" by Pugsley Munion
- "Son of a Preacher Man" by Dusty Springfield
- "Life is a Beautiful Thing" by Tension
- "I Saw the Light" by Todd Rundgren

Track 3: Someone Saved My Life Tonight

- "Mama Told Me to Watch Out" by Freddie & Henchi/the Soulsetters
- "Let's Dance" by Family Plann
- "Naturally" by HP Riot
- "Will It Go Round in Circles" by Billy Preston
- "One Happy Christmas" by Tammy Wynette

Track 4: I Saw The Light

- "Satellite of Love" by Lou Reed
- "Sweet Emotion" by Aerosmith
- "With a Song" by Tacoma
- "We've Got It All" by Faustus
- "Under Pressure" by Freddie & Henchi/the Soulsetters
- "Sun of California" by APM Music

Track 5: Fire

- "Love Is a Drug" by Roxy Music
- "Could It Be Magic" by Barry Manilow
- "Baby" by Starchild
- "Iko Iko" by the Dixie Cups
- "My Room" by the Beach Boys
- "Too Late to Turn Back Now" by Cornelius Brothers & Sister Rose
- "How's He Gonna Find Me" by the Jades
- "I Write the Songs" by Barry Manilow
- "After Eight" by Neu!

Track 6: Whatever Gets You Thru The Night

- "Barbed Wire Blues" by Johnny Schell
- "Quicksand" by Pates
- "Come On Come Over" by Jaco Pastorius
- "Solid Funk" by the Funky Boys
- "Don't Stop It Now" by Hot Chocolate
- "Too Many Doors" by Liscris Soul
- "Crazy on You" by Heart

Track 7: She's Gone

- "Carry On" by Jean Knight
- "Why Don't You Do It" by Brian Wade & Oswin Flaquero
- "ChouChou" by Les Terribles
- "Babalu" by Xavier Cugat
- "Città vuota (It's A Lonely Town)" by Mina
- "Mirza" by Nino Ferrer
- "Una Striscia Di Mare" by Fred Bongusto
- "Va Danser" by Edith Piaf
- "Simply Sunday" by the Sect
- "C'est Tout" by Suzy Delair
- "La Luna" by Nikos Oikonomidis
- "Maintenant je suis un voyou" by Bruno Leys

Track 8: Looks Like We Made It

- "Ballroom Blitz" by Sweet
- "Getting It On" by Affection Collection
- "More Than a Feeling" by Boston
- "Stand Up and Meet Your Brother" by Possum River
- "The Bump" by Floyd Smith
- "Give Up the Funk" by Parliament
- "Hollywood Swinging" by Kool & the Gang
- "Honey Suckle Song" by Ray Stinnett
- "Gasoline Road" by Randall Breneman & Lincoln Grounds
- "Mr. Sunshine" by Casino
- "Life's What You Make It" by Baby
- "In the City" by the Jam
- "Let Your Love Flow" by the Bellamy Brothers

Track 9: Feels Like the First Time

- "Gold Dust Woman" by Fleetwood Mac
- "Call Me Brother" by Kubla Khan
- "Hold the Line" by Toto
- "Barracuda" by John Cale
- "Shining Star" by Earth, Wind & Fire
- "Keep Shining" by Roz Ryan
- "See No Evil" by Television

Track 10: Rock 'n' Roll Suicide

- "Got to Make It Work" by Jade
- "This Perfect Day" by the Saints
- "Dum De Dum" by Sleaze
- "Come On and Get It" by the Steppers
- "Shine A Light" by the Rolling Stones

== Credits ==
- Composer (incidental music) – Tom Howe
- Executive in charge of music – Bob Bowen, Mandi Collier
- Music consultant – Tony Berg, Brittany Douziech
- Music supervision consultant – Brittany Douziech
- Music editor – Amber Funk, Sharyn Gersh
- Music director – Ryan Hommel
- Executive music producer – Blake Mills
- Music supervisor – Frankie Pine
- Music mixer – Mike Poole
- Music prep technician – Sam Stallings
- Music instruments technician – Danny Rowe
- Music coordinator – Nikki Carrillo, Brittany Douziech
- Additional music – Mike Reed
- Vocal coach – Eric Vetro

== Other versions ==
Maren Morris and Marcus Mumford re-recorded "Look at Us Now (Honeycomb)" and released it on March 17, 2023, as an Amazon Music exclusive release. Their version was available in other streaming services on June 23, 2023. American singer Demi Lovato released her version of "Let Me Down Easy" on August 11, 2023.

== See also ==
- Jelly Road, a 2023 studio album by Blake Mills featuring Chris Weisman
