= Jelly Road =

Studio album by Blake Mills
- Released: July 14, 2023
- Studio: Sound City Studios, Los Angeles, California
- Genre: Experimental rock
- Length: 45:40
- Language: English
- Label: New Deal Records/Verve Forecast
- Producer: Blake Mills; Chris Weisman

Blake Mills chronology
Notes with Attachment (2021)	Jelly Road (2023)

I don't necessarily make records with a lot of a mission statement. Other than having songs written, you're kind of going out on the lake with a fishing pole. You know there's fish there. You don't know how long it's going to take for you to catch one. You might have a day where for some reason you don't catch anything. That's what it's like to go into the studio when I'm making most things. Certainly solo records.

—Blake Mills on his approach to writing and recording albums

Jelly Road is a 2023 album by American singer-songwriter Blake Mills. It has received positive reviews from critics and was promoted with a concert tour alongside collaborator Chris Weisman and the singles "Skeleton Is Walking" and "There Is No Now". The album marks a return to recording from Mills who had focused on production and collaboration on others' albums and features his first time being co-produced by an outside musician and features extensive co-writing by Weisman who had previously worked with Mills on Daisy Jones & the Six.

== Reception ==
Editors at The Fader chose Jelly Road to be among the best music of the week. Writing for Mojo, James McNair rated this album 4 out of 5 stars, calling it "experimental yet accessible" and comparing the music to The Band and Fleetwood Mac. Critics for NPR's All Songs Considered included this among the notable releases of the week. At Pitchfork, Evan Minsker shortlisted this as one of the best albums of the week and critic Allison Hussey rated it an 8.0 out of 10, calling it "smooth and satisfying from start to finish" and "an invigorating listen" akin to hauntology. At Uncut, Sam Richards rated this release 4 out of 5 stars for showing that Mills is "a person who cares deeply – even obsessively – about his chosen artform, and its ability to delight, console and transform" and the publication's editors named it the 43rd best album of 2023.

== Track listing ==
All songs written by Blake Mills and Chris Weisman, except where noted.

1. "Suchlike Horses" – 5:13
2. "Highway Bright" – 3:24
3. "Jelly Road" (Ben Aylon, Blake Mills, and Chris Weisman) – 2:55
4. "Skeleton Is Walking" – 5:58
5. "Unsingable" – 3:02
6. "Wendy Melvoin" – 2:58
7. "The Light Is Long" – 3:14
8. "Breakthrough Moon" – 4:28
9. "There Is No Now" – 2:20
10. "Press My Luck" – 4:34
11. "A Fez" (Cass McCombs, Mills, and Weisman) – 3:15
12. "Without an Ending" – 4:19

== Personnel ==
"Suchlike Horses"

- Blake Mills – acoustic guitar, rubber-bridge acoustic guitar, fretless sustainer guitar, Paradis Avalon guitar, inverted tuning acoustic guitar, ARP 2600 synthesizer, Fender Rhodes electric piano, upright piano, vocals
- G. Weller – acoustic guitar
- Gabi Zachetto – vocals

"Highway Bright"

- Blake Mills – drums, percussion, hard right electric bass guitar, harmonium, grand piano, celesta, Paradis Avalon guitar, prepared electric guitar, vocals
- Sam Gendel – bass saxophone
- Wendy Melvoin – prepared electric guitar
- Chris Weisman – drums, percussion, hard left electric bass guitar, synthesizer guitar, celesta, prepared electric guitar

"Jelly Road"

- Blake Mills – acoustic guitar upright bass, inverted tuning acoustic guitar, rubber-bridge electric guitar, June 106 synthesizer, rubber-bridge tenor bass guitar, guitar synthesizer, vocals
- Wendy Melvoin – vocals
- Abe Rounds – drums
- Chris Weisman – Yamaha Venova soprano saxophone, Fender Rhodes electric piano, vocals

"Skeleton Is Walking"

- Blake Mills – acoustic guitar, inverted tuning acoustic guitar, upright bass, fretless sustainer guitar, Juno 106 synthesizer, DX100 synthesizer, percussion, vocals
- Abe Rounds – drums
- Kyle Thomas – electric tremolo guitar, percussion
- Chris Weisman – acoustic guitar, Yamaha Venova soprano saxophone, percussion

"Unsingable"

- Blake Mills – upright piano, fretless sustainer guitar, vocals
- Sam Gendel – electronic wind controller
- Abe Rounds – drums, percussion
- Chris Weisman – Yamaha Venova soprano saxophone

"Wendy Melvoin"

- Blake Mills – harmonica, acoustic guitar, upright bass, fretless sustainer guitar
- Sam Gendel – contrabass recorder
- Larry Goldings – upright piano Akai S612 sampler, DX100 synthesizer
- Abe Rounds – drums, percussion

"The Light Is Long"

- Blake Mills – acoustic guitar, upright bass, percussion, fretless sustainer guitar, vocals
- Teddy Geiger – percussion
- Sam Gendel – electronic wind controller
- Chris Weisman – inverted tuning acoustic guitar, Yamaha Venova soprano saxophone

"Breakthrough Moon"

- Blake Mills – electric guitar, slide guitar, electric bass guitar, acoustic guitar, Paradis Avalon guitar, percussion, vocals
- Meg Duffy – vocals
- Stuart Johnson – drums
- Roger Manning Jr. – Acetone organ, Hammond C3 organ
- Kane Ritchotte – percussion

"There Is No Now"

- Blake Mills – acoustic guitar, percussion, tuned percussion, electric bass guitar, fretless sustainer guitar, synthesizer, vocals
- Sam Gendel – contrabass recorder
- Abe Rounds – drums, percussion
- Chris Weisman – grand piano

"Press My Luck"

- Blake Mills – acoustic guitar, grand piano, rubber-bridge tenor bass guitar, Paradis Avalon guitar, vocals
- Abe Rounds – drums
- Wendy Melvoin – electric wah-wah guitar
- Chris Weisman – grand piano solo

"A Fez"

- Blake Mills – acoustic guitar, inverted tuning rubber-bridge slide electric guitar, upright bass, vocals

"Without an Ending"

- Blake Mills – electric guitar, electric bass guitar, percussion, grand piano, fretless sustainer guitar, vocals
- Sam Gendel – saxophone
- Jesca Hoop – vocals

Technical personnel

- Julian Chavez – album design, package design
- Daniel Krieger – mastering for vinyl at SST, Frankfurt, Germany
- Joseph Lorge – recording, mixing, photography
- Blake Mills – mixing, production, photography
- Mike Piscitelli – cover photography
- Patricia Sullivan – mastering at Bernie Grudman Mastering at Hollywood, California, United States
- Kyle Thomas – photography, album design
- Chris Weisman – production, photography

== See also ==
- 2023 in American music
- List of 2023 albums
- Music of Daisy Jones & the Six
