= Carrie Soto Is Back =

2022 novel by Taylor Jenkins Reid

- Author: Taylor Jenkins Reid
- Publisher: Ballantine Books
- Publication date: August 30, 2022
- ISBN: 978-0593158685

Carrie Soto Is Back is a 2022 historical fiction novel by Taylor Jenkins Reid. The book follows a tennis player as she attempts to return from retirement and defend her record of grand slam wins. The novel received the 2022 Goodreads Choice Award for best historical fiction, and is set to be adapted into a television series by Netflix.

== Plot ==
In the 1990s, Carrie Soto is a retired tennis player, who had the most grand slam wins. That decade, she faces the loss of that record to a younger player, Nicki Chan, and resolves to come out of retirement at the age of 37.

== Writing ==
Taylor Jenkins Reid is an American author who published her first novel in 2013. Beginning in 2017 she published a series of novels set in the same fictional universe and centered around famous women: The Seven Husbands of Evelyn Hugo, Daisy Jones & the Six, and Malibu Rising. Carrie Soto Is Back was Reid's fourth such novel.

Reid was inspired by the American tennis player Serena Williams. Carrie Soto Is Back was published on August 30, 2022, by Ballantine Books. Following the novel's publication, Reid stated that she intended to take a break from writing and did not have any further writing projects immediately planned.

== Reception ==
USA Today deemed Carrie Soto Is Back "a perfectly timed ode to Serena Williams," noting that Williams had announced her own retirement a month before it was published. The Week included the novel as one of its best books of 2022.

Carrie Soto Is Back received the 2022 Goodreads Choice Award for best historical fiction.

== Television adaptation ==
In April 2025, Netflix announced that they had purchased the rights to adapt Carrie Soto is Back into a television series. Deadline Hollywood reported that Serena Williams was set to be the series' executive producer.
