= Sebastian Chacon =

American actor

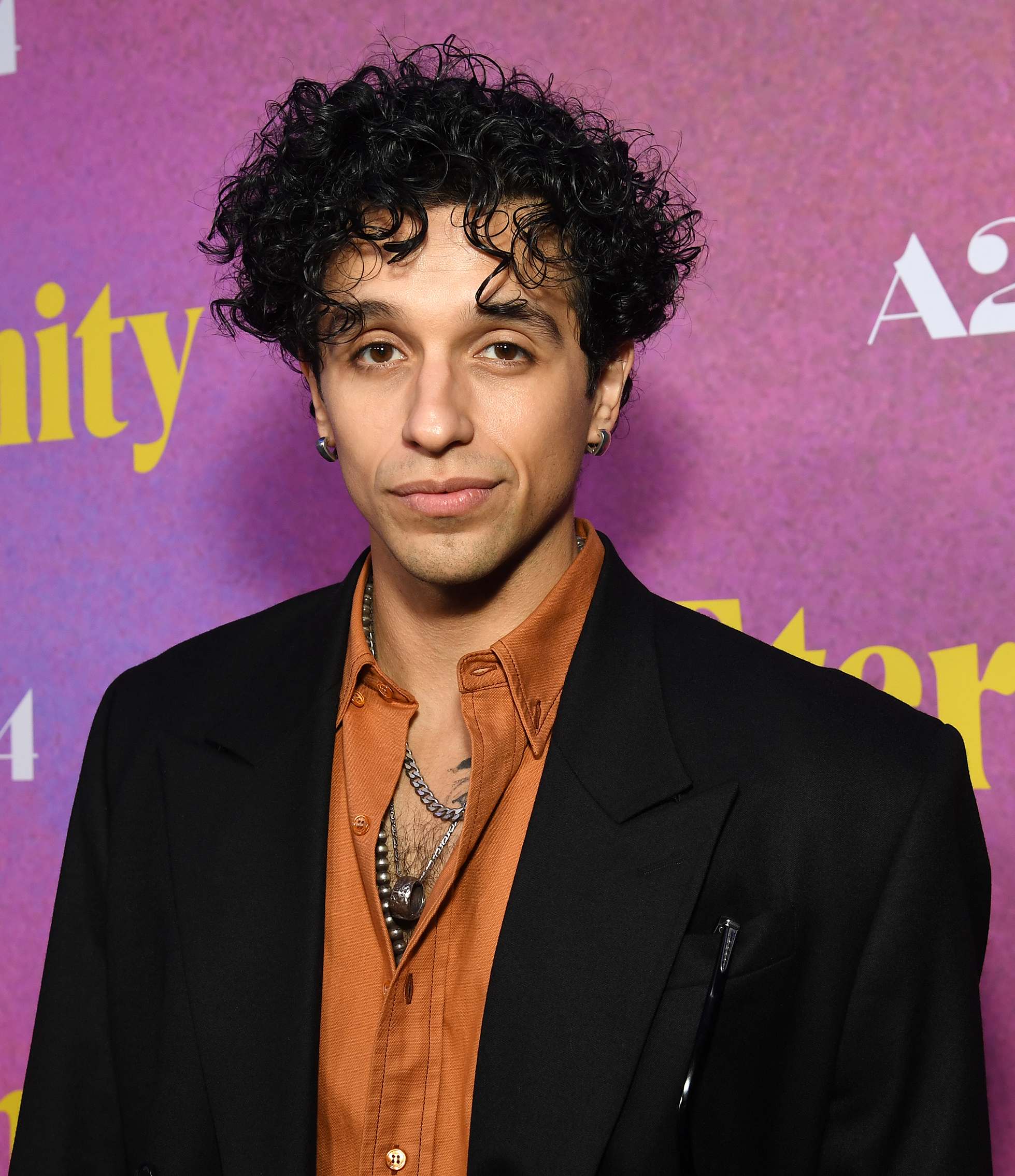
- Born: June 18, 1993 (age 33); Jamaica, Queens, New York City, New York, U.S.
- Education: New York University
- Occupation: Actor
- Years active: 2014–present

Sebastian Chacon (born June 18, 1993) is an American actor, best known for his role as Warren Rojas in the Amazon Prime Video series Daisy Jones & the Six.

== Early life and education ==
Chacon was born in Jamaica, Queens, New York City. His father is Colombian and his mother is Ecuadorian. He has two brothers named Anthony and Kevin. After completing high school, he attended New York University.

== Career ==
Chacon began his acting career in 2014, making his short film debut in Rolling as Stephen. He made his first appearance on television, playing Ken in the political drama series Madam Secretary in the episode "Higher Learning".

In 2017, Chacon made his feature film debut in the crime film Contents Under Pressure, where he played the lead role of Andre. On the same year, he made his television film debut in Crash & Burn as JR Lopez. In 2018, Chacon appeared as a Puzzlemania Clerk in a drama film Puzzle.

In 2019, Chacon appeared as Lucas in the drama miniseries Tales of the City. In 2020, Chacon had a recurring role in the historical dark fantasy series Penny Dreadful: City of Angels portraying Fly Rico. In 2022, Chacon was cast in the thriller comedy-drama film Emergency, where he played the role of Carlos.

In 2023, Chacon was cast to play the main role in the musical drama miniseries Daisy Jones & the Six, in which he played the role of Warren Rojas, the drummer.

== Sexual assault allegations ==
In November 2023, Chacon was accused of sexual assault by three women, with each alleged incident occurring between 2017 and 2022. He was dropped by his agency, in addition to being fired from the film Red Dirt. The case was dismissed by the New York State Supreme Court in April 2025 before being "discontinued with prejudice and without costs" in December 2025.

== Filmography ==
Year	Title	Role	Notes
2014	Rolling	Stephen	Short film
2015	Solace	Reinaldo	Short film
2016	Madam Secretary	Ken	Episode: "Higher Learning"
2016	La sangre en nuestras venas	Daniel Rojas	Short film
2016	Mr. Robot	Tad	Episode: "eps1.0_hellofriend.mov"
2016	The Get Down	Stevie Boy	Episode: "Where There Is Ruin, There Is Hope for a Treasure"
2016	Gotham	Whiny Red Hood	Episode: "Mad City: Anything for You"
2016	Elementary	Dishwasher	Episode: "Ill Tidings"
2017	Still Grove	Darrel	Short film
2017	Narcos	Rico	Episode: "Best Laid Plans"
2017	Happy!	Paramedic 2	Episode: "Saint Nick"
2017	Contents Under Pressure	Andre	
2017	Crash & Burn	JR Lopez	Television film
2018	Puzzle	Puzzlemania Clerk	
2018	Chicago Fire	Aaron	Episode: "Slamigan"
2018	Deception	Frait	Episode: "Masking"
2018	Pose	Pito	2 episodes
2019	Unbreakable Kimmy Schmidt	Diego	Episode: "Sliding Van Doors"
2019	Radio Killer	Eric	Short film
2019	Tales of the City	Lucas	3 episodes
2019	The Code	PFC Mason	Episode: "Secret Squirrel"
2019	Angelfish	Ricky	
2020	Penny Dreadful: City of Angels	Fly Rico	Recurring role; 8 episodes
2022	Emergency	Carlos	
2023	Daisy Jones & the Six	Warren Rojas	Main role
2024	Y2K	P-Money	
2024	Humane	Noah York	
