= Humane (film) =

2024 film by Caitlin Cronenberg

- Theatrical release poster
- Directed by: Caitlin Cronenberg
- Written by: Michael Sparaga
- Produced by: Michael Sparaga
- Starring: Jay Baruchel; Emily Hampshire; Sebastian Chacon; Alanna Bale; Sirena Gulamgaus; Uni Park; Enrico Colantoni; Peter Gallagher
- Cinematography: Douglas Koch
- Edited by: Orlee Buium
- Music by: Todor Kobakov
- Production companies: Victory Man Productions; Prospero Pictures; Telefilm Canada; Red Jar Capital; XYZ Films; Crave
- Distributed by: Elevation Pictures (Canada); IFC Films (US)
- Release date: April 26, 2024
- Running time: 94 minutes
- Countries: Canada; United States
- Language: English
- Box office: $44,509

Humane is a 2024 horror thriller film directed by Caitlin Cronenberg, and written and produced by Michael Sparaga. It stars Jay Baruchel, Emily Hampshire, Sebastian Chacon, Alanna Bale, Sirena Gulamgaus, Uni Park, Enrico Colantoni, and Peter Gallagher. It is Cronenberg's first feature film and was released on April 26, 2024. The film combines elements of horror thriller and family drama to address the topic of the climate crisis.

== Plot ==
Amid an environmental crisis that caused the world's governments to mandate voluntary as well as conscripted euthanasia as a means of population control, former news broadcaster Charles York summons his four adult children to dinner at his home with his second wife, celebrity chef Dawn Kim. The children include controversial anthropologist Jared York, embattled pharmaceutical CEO Rachel York, struggling actress Ashley York, recovering addict Noah York, and Rachel's young daughter Mia.

A family argument ensues when Charles announces that he and Dawn willingly enlisted in the Department of Citizen Strategy's (D.O.C.S.) euthanasia program. However, Dawn later sneaks out and flees after changing her mind. Bob from the Department of Citizen Strategy arrives with armed D.O.C.S. agents. Another heated argument breaks out when they learn that Charles scheduled his euthanasia for that same evening with everyone present.

With Dawn now absent, Charles attempts to reschedule his appointment. Bob presents Charles with cancellation documents that would freeze the family's assets and publicly out Charles as a traitor so he chooses to go ahead with it. Following Charles's death, Bob informs the family that legally, he must collect a second body as originally promised. Bob takes Mia, who is exempt from euthanasia because she is a minor, outside while the four Yorks are given two hours to decide which one of them will die.

Jared suggests Noah to die because he is adopted and a disappointing drain on the family, who killed a woman in a car accident. Rachel attempts to stab Noah, but he fights back and gets the knife away from her. Rachel then tries to turn everyone against him by talking about money, making Ashley reveal that Noah received half a million dollars from their father to make the incident of the car crash go away. With that reveal, all the siblings turn against Noah and hunt him down. Noah fights to physically defend himself against his siblings. Eventually, they all restrain him.

Having received a text from him, Noah's girlfriend Grace Dawson arrives at the house. Panicking over the situation, Grace causes a commotion that ends when a D.O.C.S. agent shoots her dead. Noah breaks free and stabs, chokes, and fights back against his siblings. Realizing they are close to killing each other, Rachel volunteers to be euthanized. Jared contends he should be the volunteer because he abandoned his first wife and his son Lucas. Noah brings everyone together by proposing to kill Bob instead.

The siblings lure Bob and the D.O.C.S. agents into the house where they are disarmed and taken hostage. However, Ashley dies of the injuries she sustained while struggling with Noah. The siblings euthanize the agent who shot Grace. Bob admits that Dawn was taken into custody and is now being held at D.O.C.S. headquarters. Bob continues to desperately bargain and makes threats as Noah prepares to inject him with the euthanasia drug. The camera cuts to black.

Some time later, Jared, Rachel, Mia, Dawn, and Jared's son Lucas attend a piano concert performed by Noah, who was once a promising virtuoso. A bruised and battered Bob appears in a television commercial where government propaganda claims Ashley and Grace enlisted to be voluntarily euthanized.

== Cast ==
- Jay Baruchel as Jared
- Emily Hampshire as Rachel
- Sebastian Chacon as Noah
- Alanna Bale as Ashley
- Sirena Gulamgaus as Mia
- Uni Park as Dawn
- Martin Roach as Tony
- Blessing Adedijo as Grace
- Enrico Colantoni as Bob
- Peter Gallagher as Charles

== Production ==
In December 2021, it was reported that Caitlin Cronenberg was set to direct the thriller Humane, written and produced by Michael Sparaga through his company Victory Man Productions and executive produced by Martin Katz and Karen Wookey of Prospero Pictures. In November 2022, Jay Baruchel, Emily Hampshire and Peter Gallagher were revealed to be a part of the main cast.

Principal photography began on October 17, 2022, in Hamilton, Ontario over 20 days, with filming being done at Ravenscliffe Castle for 17 days.

== Release ==
Humane was released day-and-date in Canada by Elevation Pictures and the United States by IFC Films on April 26, 2024, on Shudder on July 26, 2024, and on Hulu on January 26, 2025. It was released on Paramount+ in the UK, France, and Ireland on January 10, 2025, and HBO Asia in on June 6, 2025.

== Reception ==
On the review aggregator website Rotten Tomatoes, 72% of 60 critics' reviews are positive, with an average rating of 6.2/10. The website's consensus reads: "Humane's twisted psychological thrills are diverting enough in the moment to distract from its occasionally awkward attempts to balance sociopolitical commentary against high-concept horror." Metacritic, which uses a weighted average, assigned the film a score of 59 out of 100, based on 12 critics, indicating "mixed or average" reviews.

Owen Gleiberman of Variety raved, "Cronenberg stages Humane with a fearless matter-of-factness, with telling nods to issues of corporate surveillance and the evils of private contracting, and with a vivid eye for the schemes and secrets hidden in the Victorian nooks and crannies of that house."

A three out of four stars review from Richard Roeper of the Chicago Sun-Times stated, "There are some delightfully squeamish scenes — but this is primarily a psychological thriller, an update/variation on The Fall of the House of Usher."

John Anderson of The Wall Street Journal stated, "Hardcore horror fans will get their dose of mayhem from Humane, though in its modest, tidily organized fashion the film might also get under the skin."

The New York Times declared, "It’s a strangely sticky story, one that lingered after the movie was over."

A two out of four stars review on RogerEbert.com stated, "Most of what's clever about Humane exists on its fringe—including perhaps that a Cronenberg has made a film that's, at least in part, about nepotism—primarily in how it throws its characters from their ivory tower and then watches them fight in the mud over who gets to climb back up. The social commentary talking points embedded in Humane are undoubtedly intriguing, but too many of them feel superficial, flirting with ideas about privilege without having much to say about them."

IndieWire called the film "a sharp but slight thriller" while Collider praised the dark comedy aspects of the film.

== See also ==
- Ecoauthoritarianism – Political ideology combining environmental protection with authoritarian governance
- Procedural justice – Fairness in the processes that resolve disputes and allocate resources
- Climate justice – Concept for social justice in climate change context
