= One True Loves =

2023 American film by Andy Fickman

- Theatrical release poster
- Directed by: Andy Fickman
- Screenplay by: Taylor Jenkins Reid; Alex Jenkins Reid
- Based on: One True Loves by Taylor Jenkins Reid
- Produced by: Adam Beasley; Sarah Halley Finn; Arianne Fraser; Petr Jákl; Ryan Donnell Smith; Willie Kutner; Betsy Sullenger; Andy Fickman; Michael Jefferson
- Starring: Phillipa Soo; Simu Liu; Luke Bracey
- Cinematography: Greg Gardiner
- Edited by: Jeff Freeman
- Music by: Nathan Wang
- Production companies: R.U. Robot; Highland Film Group; BuzzFeed Studios; Volition Media; Blue Rider Media; Thomasville Pictures
- Distributed by: The Avenue
- Release date: April 7, 2023
- Running time: 100 minutes
- Country: United States
- Language: English

One True Loves is a 2023 American romantic comedy-drama film directed and produced by Andy Fickman as an adaptation of the 2016 novel of the same name by Taylor Jenkins Reid. The film stars Phillipa Soo, Simu Liu and Luke Bracey.

Emma's husband Jesse disappears in a helicopter crash, so she moves back home to recover. Four years later, Emma has moved on, becoming engaged to lifelong friend Sam. When Jesse turns up alive, she must now choose between her husband and her fiancé.

One True Loves was released in the United States on April 7, 2023.

== Plot ==
Emma recalls meeting her eventual husband Jesse 15 years previously at a high school keg party with her best friend Sam. Now, at her parents,' celebrating her recent engagement to Sam, she gets a shocking call from Jesse, saying he is still alive, four years after he was declared dead.

Emma remembers her first kiss with Jesse in the police station, taken in for attending an underage party. Both are anxious to leave their small life and experience the world so they head out to do it, Jesse as a photographer and Emma as a writer. Exploring the world, he proposes after six years. They marry in Maine by a lighthouse near his cabin.

Jesse disappears in a helicopter crash a year after the wedding, on his way to an Alaska assignment. So, Emma moves back to Acton, Massachusetts, in an effort to mend her life back together. Working at her family bookstore in town, her older sister Marie constantly tries to guide her.

Four years later, Emma runs into her old best friend, Sam, and they become inseparable. Newly engaged, she receives an unexpected phone call revealing Jesse is alive. Completely torn, Emma must now choose between her husband and fiancé.

Jesse's return is heavily televised. Just before he arrives to his parents', they warn Emma that Jesse knows nothing about her new engagement. They have an empassioned kiss on camera, but in the house she tells him about her engagement.

Later, at home with Sam, after he expresses insecurity after seeing Emma kissing Jesse on TV, Emma and Sam make love. Waking, he sees she is not wearing his engagement ring. As Emma has mixed feelings about whom she loves, she temporarily moves out until she can figure out her feelings.

Marie, Emma's older sister who has been pushing her for years to move on from Jesse, takes her in. Emma picks him up by car and sees her family briefly, before they drive to the Maine cabin for the weekend. When Emma does not respond to text messages Sam sends her, he has a meltdown in his high school band class, eventually keeping them and much of the school listening until the end of the day talking about Emma.

At the cabin, Jesse and Emma discover new things about each other. She has tattoos and, since moving back east, her life focus is different. Emma is more sedentary and is content to run the family bookstore, no longer interested in their nomadic lifestyle. Moving back to New England, she eventually was able to heal from the pain of Jesse's believed death. Emma now wants kids, which they had never discussed.

Although his driving license was revoked upon his declared death, Jesse and Emma get pulled over for speeding. Showing the officer the articles about his disappearance-reappearance he gets let off the hook. However, in the process not only does Jesse see that Emma reverted to her maiden name, but he also finds an old letter addressed to him.

Climbing the nearby lighthouse, Jesse reads the letter. In it, Emma explains how her grieving process over him evolved over the first three years. At first in denial, Emma submerged herself in books not about death or love. Then she crossed paths again with Sam, and the former best friends eventually begin a relationship. By the time Jesse finishes the letter, both he and Emma realise they no longer work.

Back in Acton, Emma seeks out Sam. Accidentally rear-ending him at a stop light, they both get out of their cars and profess their love for each other.

Two years later, a pregnant Emma gets a letter from Jesse. He thanks her for helping him survive his ordeal. Jesse has also moved on, is living in California and in a new relationship.

== Cast ==
- Phillipa Soo as Emma
- Simu Liu as Sam
- Luke Bracey as Jesse
- Michaela Conlin as Marie
- Michael O'Keefe as Colin
- Lauren Tom as Ann
- Tom Everett Scott as Michael
- Beth Broderick as Francine
- Gary Hudson as Joe

== Production ==
One True Loves is an adaptation of the 2016 novel of the same name by Taylor Jenkins Reid. The feature film from Highland Film Group was announced on June 2, 2021, with Andy Fickman attached to direct and produce and Phillipa Soo, Simu Liu, and Luke Bracey set to star. In September 2021, the film's distribution rights in the United States were sold to The Avenue and Michaela Conlin joined the cast. In an interview, Liu said producer Sarah Finn, casting director for the Marvel Cinematic Universe, allowed him to choose which lead role he would portray after inviting him to star in his first film after Shang-Chi and the Legend of the Ten Rings. He added,

It's always been important to me to constantly challenge people's perceptions of myself, as well as of Asian people as a whole. While I celebrate legendary actors such as Jackie Chan, Jet Li, and Bruce Lee, I know that my path is very different. I am not a master of kung-fu, after all; I am an actor who trained very hard to embody the character that I was hired to play. As such, I'm beyond excited to step into Sam's shoes for this movie that I am deeply in love with.

Filming was originally set to take place in Massachusetts. By August 2021, Highland Film Group was in negotiations with the South Carolina Film Commission to shoot the film in South Carolina instead. However, the studio failed to secure insurance due to the state's low vaccination rates and increasing cases of COVID-19. As a result, the production was moved to North Carolina, where filming began in Wilmington on October 11, 2021. On that day, a scene was shot at 1938 South Live Oak Parkway in which a news crew covers a reunion between a family and a loved one who had been missing. On October 25, 2021, it was reported Lauren Tom, Michael O'Keefe, Tom Everett Scott, Cooper van Grootel, Oona Yaffe, and Phinehas Yoon would also star. At the American Film Market in November 2021, a first look image of the film was released.

== Release ==
One True Loves was released theatrically on April 7, 2023, digital format on April 14, 2023 and video on demand on April 28, 2023.

== Reception ==
On the review aggregator website Rotten Tomatoes, 25% of 28 critics' reviews are positive, with an average rating of 3.9/10. The website's consensus reads: "Cheap-looking and tonally confused, One True Loves wastes an interesting premise on a romantic comedy that largely lacks love and laughs." Metacritic, which uses a weighted average, assigned the film a score of 35 out of 100, based on 7 critics, indicating "generally unfavorable" reviews.
