= Taylor Jenkins Reid =

American novelist (born 1983)

- Born: December 20, 1983 (age 42); Maryland, U.S.
- Education: Emerson College (BA)
- Occupation: Author
- Years active: 2013–present
- Known for: The Seven Husbands of Evelyn Hugo (2017); Daisy Jones & the Six (2019)
- Spouse: Alex Jenkins Reid
- Children: 1

Taylor Jenkins Reid (born December 20, 1983) is an American author best known for her novels The Seven Husbands of Evelyn Hugo, Daisy Jones & the Six, One True Loves, Malibu Rising, Carrie Soto Is Back, and Atmosphere. She has written nine novels, several of which were #1 New York Times bestselling novels.

== Early life ==
Reid was born in Maryland on December 20, 1983. At age 12, she and her family moved to Acton, Massachusetts. As a child, she was not particularly fond of reading, but after reading "Roman Fever" in literature class in high school, she began warming up to literature.

Reid graduated from Emerson College in Boston and majored in media studies.

== Career ==
Reid began her career in film production. After graduating from college, she moved to Los Angeles and worked as a casting assistant. Reid also worked at a high school before she got a book deal. She signed with her first literary agent at age 24.

Forever, Interrupted, her first novel, was published in July 2013. It is about a young woman named Elsie whose romance with Ben ends when he dies in a car accident days after their elopement. The story goes on to follow Elsie as she navigates her grief and forms a bond with her mother-in-law, Susan.

Reid co-wrote the television show Resident Advisors, which premiered in 2015.

Reid's novel One True Loves was published in 2016. The film adaption, released in 2023, stars Phillipa Soo, Simu Liu and Luke Bracey.

Her novel The Seven Husbands of Evelyn Hugo was published in 2017 to commercial and critical acclaim. The novel tells the story of a fictional Old Hollywood star as she reveals the long-held secrets tarnishing both her mysterious life and glamorous marriages.

Reid's 2019 novel Daisy Jones & the Six recounts, using an oral history format, the ups and downs of a fictional 1970s rock band loosely based on Fleetwood Mac. Daisy Jones & the Six won the Goldsboro Books Glass Bell Award in 2020. The novel was a finalist for Book of the Month's Book of the Year award in 2021. The audiobook version was named one of Apple Books' Best Audiobooks of 2019. Amazon Studios developed the book into a miniseries, which debuted in 2023.

In June 2021, Reid released the historical fiction novel Malibu Rising. The book was a New York Times best seller. It is currently being adapted by Hulu into a television series.

Reid's novel Carrie Soto Is Back was published in 2022. It is the fourth and presumed final book of Reid's "famous-women quartet" set in California, following The Seven Husbands of Evelyn Hugo, Daisy Jones & the Six, and Malibu Rising. Set in the 1990s, Carrie Soto Is Back follows the titular tennis star leaving retirement to reclaim her Grand Slam record. Upon the book's release, Reid stated her intention to take an extended break before beginning her next literary project. Netflix has taken in for development Carrie Soto is Back, with Serena Williams attached as executive producer.

Her ninth novel, Atmosphere, was published in June 2025. It tells a love story of two fictional NASA astronauts during the 1980s Space Shuttle program. While conducting research for the book, Reid spent several months in Houston, Texas, the site of NASA's Mission Control Center. Shuttle Houston, the memoir of NASA’s longest-serving flight director Paul Dye, was so key to her research process that she dedicated the book to him.

== Personal life ==
While working in the film industry, Reid met and married Alex Jenkins Reid, a screenwriter. They live in Los Angeles with their daughter. In 2025, Reid stated in a Time interview that she is bisexual.

== Bibliography ==
=== Novels ===
- Forever, Interrupted (2013)
- After I Do (2014)
- Maybe in Another Life (2015)
- One True Loves (2016)
- The Seven Husbands of Evelyn Hugo (2017)
- Daisy Jones & the Six (2019)
- Malibu Rising (2021)
- Carrie Soto Is Back (2022)
- Atmosphere (2025)

=== Short stories ===
- Evidence of the Affair (2018)

== Awards ==
Work	Year & Award	Category	Result	Ref.
After I Do	2015 RUSA CODES Reading List	Women's Fiction	Shortlisted	
The Seven Husbands of Evelyn Hugo	2017 Goodreads Choice Awards	Historical Fiction	Nominated	
The Seven Husbands of Evelyn Hugo	2017 Book of the Month	Book of the Year Award	Nominated	
Daisy Jones & the Six	2019 Goodreads Choice Awards	Historical Fiction	Won	
Daisy Jones & the Six	2019 Book of the Month	Book of the Year Award	Won	
Evidence of the Affair	2020 Audie Awards	Short Stories or Collections	Nominated	
Malibu Rising	2021 Book of the Month	Book of the Year Award	Nominated	
Malibu Rising	2021 Goodreads Choice Awards	Historical Fiction	Won	
Carrie Soto Is Back	2022 Goodreads Choice Awards	Historical Fiction	Won	
Carrie Soto Is Back	2023 RUSA CODES Reading List	Relationship Fiction	Shortlisted	
Carrie Soto Is Back	2023 BookTube Prize	Fiction	Semi-Finalist	
Atmosphere	2025 Goodreads Choice Awards	Historical Fiction	Won	

In January 2024, Publishers Weekly, for its "Top 25 list of bestsellers for 2023", listed The Seven Husbands of Evelyn Hugo at #12.
