= The Lost Apothecary =

2021 novel by Sarah Penner

- First edition
- Author: Sarah Penner
- Language: English
- Subject: Novel
- Genre: Fiction
- Published: Legend Press
- Publication date: March 2021
- Publication place: UK
- Media type: Book
- Pages: 268 pages
- ISBN: 978-1789558975

The Lost Apothecary is a New York Times bestseller debut book written by Sarah Penner.

Fox Broadcasting Company is developing a television adaptation of the novel.

== Summary ==
The novel follows both Nella Clavinger, a woman living in London in 1791 who runs an apothecary shop aimed at selling poison to women and Caroline Parcewell, a modern-day woman visiting London to try to escape from her husband's affair. Over the course of the novel, the two women's lives intertwine as Caroline attempts to uncover what happened to Nella's apothecary.

== Plot ==
The novel switches between two characters: Nella Clavinger, a 41-year old apothecary living in 18th century London and Caroline Parcewell, a modern-day woman in her mid-thirties visiting London after discovering her husband's affair.

The novel begins with Nella, who runs an illicit apothecary shop, selling poison to women in order to protect them from the harmful men in their lives and keeping a logbook of each transaction.

Caroline, having discovered her husband of ten years, James, has been cheating on her, takes their anniversary trip without him. During this trip, she goes on a mudlarking tour of the Thames. After discovering a distinct vial with the insignia of a bear, she searches for clues as to what the unusual symbol may mean.

Flashing back to 1791, Nella's shop is visited by a young servant girl, Eliza, who has been sent by her mistress, Mrs. Amwell, for a poison to kill her (implied) pedophilic husband. After the poison works, Eliza returns to the shop, hoping to learn more about the apothecary.

In the present day, Caroline finds references to a killer apothecary and eventually tracks down the location of Nella's old shop. She photographs the old logbook, as well as some recipes and poisons, which she later transcribes into notes.

Back in the 18th century, Lady Clarence enters the apothecary in search of a poison she wants to administer on her husband's mistress. Nella initially declines the job, as she does not willingly poison other women, but after Lady Clarence threatens to report Nella, she completes the order. Eliza, fearful that Mr. Amwell's spirit is haunting her, visits a magic shop and mixes a tincture to reverse 'bad fortune'.

The present day finds Caroline's husband, James, showing up in London in attempt to reconcile. During his visit, he accidentally ingests eucalyptus oil and, after the medics discover her notes on poisons, Caroline is questioned by the police. After her name is cleared, Caroline realizes that James drank the oil on purpose to win her back. She confronts him and they agree to separate.

In 1791, Lady Clarence informs Nella that something went wrong when she attempted to poison her husband mistress, resulting in her poisoning and killing her husband instead. The authorities are also looking for Nella's shop and, as they arrive, both Nella and Eliza run towards the bridge. Nella intends to jump off the bridge, but Eliza drinks her tincture and jumps in the river herself, leaving the authorities to believe that the apothecary owner is dead. Nella decides to stop administering poisons.

Back in present day, Caroline discovers that Eliza survived as the tincture warmed her, protecting her from the cold waters. Eliza married Tom Pepper, who worked at the magic shop, and remained friends with Nella. After her discovery, Caroline decides to apply to Cambridge but refuses to publish the truth about what happened with Eliza and Nella. Instead, she dumps the vial back into the Thames.

== Reception ==
The Lost Apothecary is a New York Times best seller.

Before publication, the book was named one of the most anticipated books of the year by CNN, HELLO!, Newsweek, and O, The Oprah Magazine.

Following publication, the book received positive reviews from NPR, Booklist, and Library Journal, as well as a mixed review from Publishers Weekly. Reader's Digest, Good Housekeeping, and Cosmopolitan included it in their lists of best books of the year.

In late 2021, it was nominated for a Goodreads Choice Award for Historical Fiction and for Debut Novel.

== Adaptation ==
The novel will be adapted into a television drama series by Fox Broadcasting Company.
