= The Heart's Invisible Furies =

2017 novel by John Boyne

- Cover of the first edition
- Author: John Boyne
- Cover artist: Lucinda Rogers; Richard Ogle
- Language: English
- Genre: Contemporary fiction Social novel
- Publisher: Transworld Publishers
- Publication date: February 9, 2017
- Publication place: Great Britain
- ISBN: 978-1-473-52630-3

The Heart's Invisible Furies is a social novel by Irish novelist John Boyne and published by Doubleday in 2017. The story revolves around the life of Cyril, who struggles with his sexuality, but it takes on a broad range of prejudice and intolerance in the Ireland of the past seventy years.

== Plot ==
In 1945, sixteen-year-old Catherine Goggin is hauled up in front of her congregation and publicly shamed and humiliated by the local priest for being pregnant and unmarried. Catherine is forced out of her home and uses what little money she has to buy a bus ticket for Dublin. On the bus she meets a young man, Sean MacIntyre, who agrees to let her stay with him and his flatmate, Jack Smoot, who is in a secret relationship with Sean. Heavily pregnant by this point, Catherine decides to give the baby up for adoption when it is born to give them both a chance of surviving. Catherine goes into labour just as Sean and Jack's flat is broken into by Sean's father who in drunken rage ends up beating his son to death for being gay. Catherine gives birth to her son on the floor next to Sean's bloodied body with an inconsolable Jack kneeling by his corpse.

Catherine's son is adopted by Charles and Maude Avery of Dartmouth Square who name him Cyril. They repeatedly remind Cyril that he is not their real son and to always refer to them as his ‘adoptive parents’ and are unaware who his real parents are. Charles is a banker and Maude is a little known but highly regarded (much to her chagrin) writer. At the age of seven, Cyril meets Julian Woodbead (the son of Charles' solicitor, Max). Cyril is instantly captivated by his good looks, confidence and knowledge of sexual subjects despite also being only seven. At this time, Charles is being prosecuted for tax evasion with Max regularly visiting and Cyril constantly hoping he will bring Julian. Charles ends up being convicted after his relationship with Max falls apart because Charles slept with his wife.

Some years later after Maude dies of cancer, Cyril is sent away to boarding school. He is surprised and delighted when he is told that his new roommate is Julian. The two become friends with Cyril just as enthralled by Julian as he had been before. Cyril begins to harbour very romantic and erotic feelings towards Julian; frequently fantasising about him and being extremely jealous of anyone who Julian shows affection for. After they sneak out of school to go to a pub with some girls, Julian is abducted by the IRA as a result of his father's extremely publicised pro-British views. Max refuses to pay the ransom resulting in Julian losing several body parts. A nationwide manhunt is launched and eventually Julian is found and rescued although now missing a toe, a finger and an ear.

After finishing school, Cyril works at the department of education and makes great efforts to maintain his friendship with Julian who is often away travelling with a different assortment of girlfriends. Cyril goes to considerable lengths to conceal his homosexuality while frequently going to places at night to have sex with other men. He often contemplates suicide, undergoes violent forms of therapy and tries having girlfriends but to no avail. In 1973 he remakes the acquaintance of Julian's younger sister, Alice. The two get along, start a relationship and eventually become engaged despite Cyril having no physical attraction to her. On several occasions, he nearly confesses that he is gay but always loses his nerve. On the day of their wedding, Cyril impulsively kisses Julian and admits his feelings for him. Incensed, Julian forces Cyril to go through with the wedding as Alice had already been jilted once before. At the reception Cyril makes an excuse and flees the scene, deserting his family, Alice and Julian.

Cyril winds up in Amsterdam and finds happiness after he starts dating a Dutch doctor, Bastiaan, who he meets at an Irish pub ran by Jack Smoot. Bastiaan and Cyril come home one day to find a beaten Slovenian teenager, Ignac, outside their building. They take him in, find him a job in Jack's pub and in time become surrogate fathers to him. Ignac tells them that his grandmother sent him to Amsterdam to live with his father who had then forced him to work as a rent boy. After a few months, Ignac's father comes to the pub force him to return to work for him, causing a fist-fight before he is killed by Jack. In 1987, Cyril, Bastiaan and Ingac have moved to New York where Bastiaan works as AIDS researcher at Mount Sinai. Cyril volunteers to talk to patients who have no friends or family. One day, Cyril walks into a room and is horrified to find Julian in the final stages of AIDS. Julian tells Cyril that he left Alice pregnant and has a son, Liam. A few days later, Bastiaan calls Cyril into the hospital just in time to see Julian die. As Cyril and Bastiaan leave that night, they are attacked by a group of thugs, severely injuring Cyril and killing Bastiaan.

By 1994, Cyril has returned to Ireland, and works in the Dáil library. He is still mourning Bastiaan and has a strained relationship with Alice and Liam. Charles is in prison again and is in the early stages of dementia. After a tumour is found in his brain he is let out on compassionate grounds and asks Cyril if he can live at his old house on Dartmouth Square now occupied by Alice, her boyfriend (also called Cyril) and Liam. Alice agrees and Charles dies a few weeks later after finishing all of Maude's novels (which have become international bestsellers since her death). In 2001, Cyril accompanies Ignac to Slovenia for his latest book tour. They return to Ignac’s childhood home where he reveals he moved in with his grandmother after his mother died but ran away from home after his grandmother tried to pimp him out. On Christmas Day, Cyril goes to hospital as Liam and his wife are having their second child who they name Julian. On his way out, Cyril sees an old woman crying in the hospital chapel and recognises her as Catherine Goggin who he has met on several occasions over the years. Catherine is mourning her son who died earlier that day. She admits to Cyril that she gave up another son decades earlier. This eventually leads to Cyril to realise that he was that son.

In 2008, Cyril and Catherine visit her home town of Goleen, where she reminisces about her childhood and humiliation. She tells Cyril that his father was in fact her aunt's husband who she had seduced as a teenager but had not wanted a relationship with him. In 2015, Cyril, now in his early seventies, prepares for a wedding in now Liam's house on Dartmouth Square filled with his sizeable family. Cyril begins to have visions of people from his past including Charles, Maude, Bastiaan and Julian who indicate to him that he will be dead soon. The family arrive at the church where Catherine, now in her mid eighties, is marrying a man she met online. Before the ceremony, she and Cyril reflect on how much Ireland has changed over their lifetime. Cyril walks his mother down the aisle surrounded by their collective families and finally feels a sense of peace and happiness.

== Censorship ==
In April 2025, the Lukashenko regime added the book to the List of printed publications containing information messages and materials, the distribution of which could harm the national interests of Belarus.
