= Sarah Penner =

American author

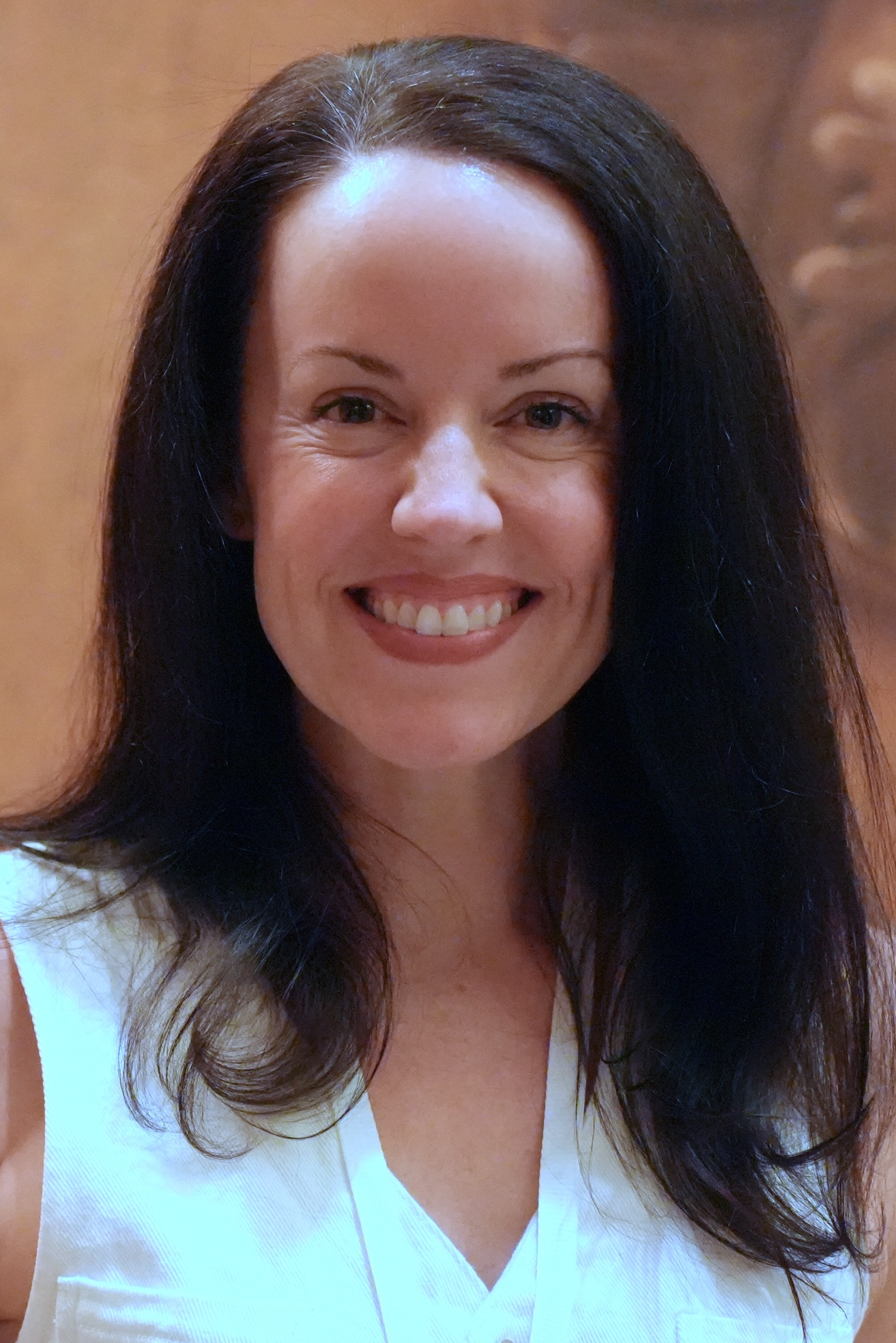
Penner in 2025

Sarah Penner is an American author. Her debut novel, The Lost Apothecary, is a New York Times best seller.

== Personal life ==
Penner was born and raised in northeast Kansas.

She attended the University of Kansas and graduated with a degree in finance. She currently works in finance full-time and is a member of Historical Novel Society and the Women’s Fiction Writers Association.

Penner currently lives in Florida with her husband Marc and their miniature dachshund Zoe.

== The Lost Apothecary ==
The Lost Apothecary is a New York Times bestseller, published March 2, 2021 by Park Row Books.

The book received positive reviews from NPR, Booklist, and Library Journal, as well as a mixed review from Publishers Weekly. Reader's Digest and Cosmopolitan included it in their lists of the best books for the year.

In 2021, it was nominated for a Goodreads Choice Award for Historical Fiction and for Debut Novel.

Fox Broadcasting Company is currently working on adapting the book into a television drama series.

== Bibliography ==
- The Lost Apothecary (2021)
- The London Séance Society (2023)
- The Amalfi Curse (2025)
