= Luke Bracey =

Australian actor (born 1989)

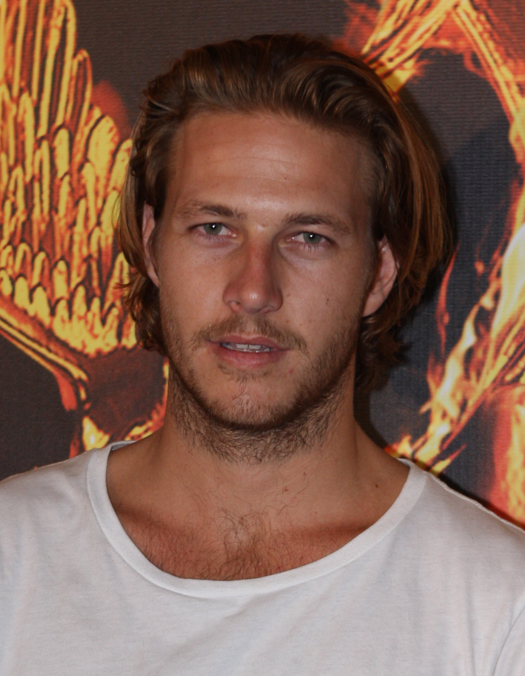
- Bracey at the premiere of The Hunger Games in Sydney in 2012
- Born: 26 April 1989 (age 37); Sydney, New South Wales, Australia
- Occupation: Actor
- Years active: 2009–present

Luke Bracey (born 26 April 1989) is an Australian actor. He is known for his work in films such as Monte Carlo (2011), G.I. Joe: Retaliation (2013), The November Man (2014), Point Break (2015), Hacksaw Ridge (2016), and Elvis (2022); and for television series such as Home and Away, which was his first appearance on screen.

== Career ==
Bracey began his acting career by appearing in the Australian television soap opera series Home and Away. His start came after receiving an invitation to audition; he played the role of Trey Palmer in the series during 2009. He also played Aaron Dean in several episodes of the first season of Dance Academy, broadcast in Australia in 2010. His first big-screen role was in Monte Carlo, shot in Europe in 2010 and released the following year. In 2012, he moved to the United States to further his acting career.

After moving he played Cobra Commander in G.I. Joe: Retaliation (2013), replacing Joseph Gordon-Levitt from the first film. In March 2013, he signed on for the male lead role in the drama pilot Westside, produced by McG and developed by Ilene Chaiken for the American Broadcasting Company; the pilot was not developed into a series. He then had lead roles in the 2014 films The November Man and The Best of Me. In 2015, Bracey starred in Point Break as FBI Agent Johnny Utah, in the remake of the 1991 film. He played ferocious American soldier Smitty Ryker in combat in Okinawa in Hacksaw Ridge. In 2026 he played the iconic role of Charles Ingalls in the Netflix series Little House on the Prairie.

== Filmography ==
=== Film ===
Year	Title	Role	Notes
2011	Monte Carlo	Riley	
2013	G.I. Joe: Retaliation	Cobra Commander	Voiced by Robert Baker
2014	The November Man	CIA Agent David Mason	
2014	The Best of Me	Young Dawson Cole	
2015	Me Him Her	Brendan Ehrlick	
2015	Point Break	FBI Agent Johnny "Utah" Brigham	
2016	Hacksaw Ridge	"Smitty" Ryker	
2019	Danger Close: The Battle of Long Tan	Sergeant Bob Buick	
2019	Lucky Day	"Red"	
2020	Holidate	Jackson Piretti	
2020	The Very Excellent Mr. Dundee	Himself (cameo)	
2021	American Dream	Scott	
2021	Violet	"Red"	
2022	Interceptor	Alexander Kessel	
2022	Elvis	Jerry Schilling	
2023	Maybe I Do	Allen	
2023	One True Loves	Jesse	
2023	Mercy Road	Tom	
2025	The Travellers	Stephen	

=== Television ===
Key
†	Denotes television productions that have not yet been released

Year	Title	Role	Notes
2009	Home and Away	Trey Palmer	Recurring role
2010	Dance Academy	Aaron	3 episodes
2013	Westside	Chris Carver	Unaired TV pilot
2020	Little Fires Everywhere	Jamie Caplan	3 episodes
2026	The Artful Dodger	Henry Boxer	Main cast
2026–present	Little House on the Prairie	Charles Ingalls	Main cast

== See also ==
- List of Australian film actors
