= Marjan Kamali =

Iranian-American novelist

Kamali in 2021

Marjan Kamali (born 1971) is an Iranian-American novelist and author. Her novels have been published in more than 30 languages and have received both national and international acclaim She is a 2022 NEA Literature Fellow.

== Biography ==
Kamali was born in Turkey to Iranian parents. She soon moved to Iran where she lived for a few years, followed by Hamburg, Germany where she started school. She subsequently lived in Kenya and Iran again before settling in the U.S. in 1982.

Kamali received a bachelor's degree in English literature from the University of California, Berkeley, an MBA from Columbia University, and an MFA from New York University.

Her first novel, Together Tea, was published in 2013 by Ecco/HarperCollins and was a Massachusetts Book Award finalist. Her second novel, The Stationery Shop, was published by Gallery/Simon&Schuster in 2019 and became a national and international bestseller. Her third novel, The Lion Women of Tehran, was released on July 2, 2024 from Simon & Schuster and is a New York Times bestseller. Her work has been translated into over 30 languages and published in countries around the world.

== Books ==
- Together Tea. New York: Ecco Press/HarperCollins, 2013.
- The Stationery Shop. New York: Gallery Books/Simon & Schuster, 2019.
- The Lion Women of Tehran. New York: Gallery Books/Simon & Schuster, 2024.
