= Nabiyah Be =

Brazilian actress and singer (born 1992)

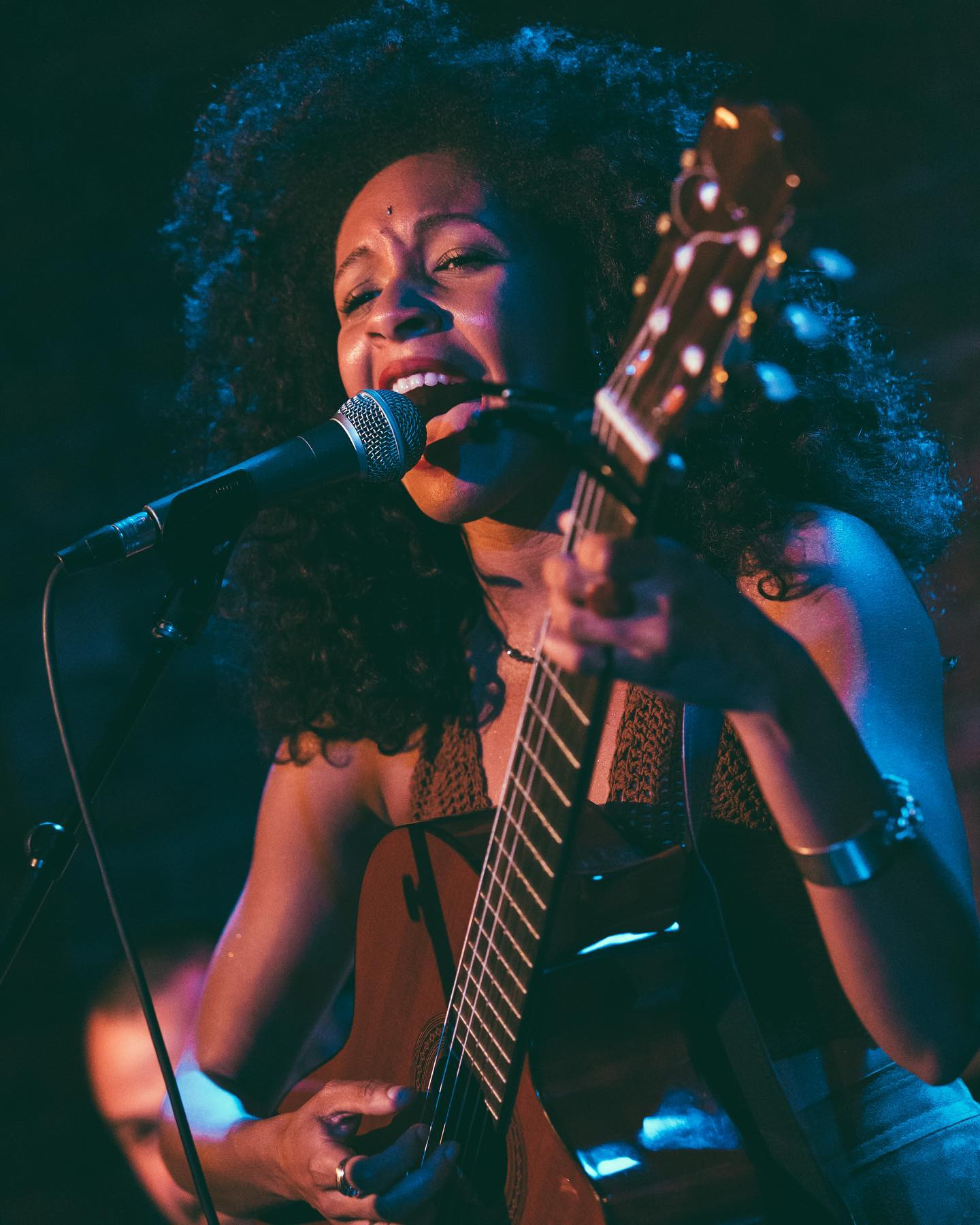
- Nabiyah Be performing at the 2019 Rockwood Music Hall music venue
- Born: 31 January 1992 (age 34); Salvador, Bahia, Brazil
- Education: Pace University
- Occupations: Actress; singer
- Years active: 2016–present
- Father: Jimmy Cliff

Nabiyah Be (born 31 January 1992) is a Brazilian actress and singer. She originated the role of Eurydice off-Broadway in the musical Hadestown and portrayed Simone Jackson in the television show Daisy Jones & the Six.

== Early life and education ==
Be was born in Brazil and grew up in Salvador in the state of Bahia. Her father is Jamaican reggae musician Jimmy Cliff, and Be toured with him as a backup singer and dancer from age seven to eleven. She also sang backup for Daniela Mercury and Carlinhos Brown. She attended Pace University in New York, and graduated with a B.F.A. in acting.

== Career ==
After graduating from college, Be originated the role of Eurydice in Anaïs Mitchell's off-Broadway play Hadestown in 2016. This was her first professional theater role. In 2017, she starred as Ericka in the Jocelyn Bioh's production of School Girls; or, the African Mean Girls Play, directed by Rebecca Taichman. For her role as Ericka, she won a 2018 Drama Desk Award.

In 2020, Be featured on the song "Querera" by Brazilian singer and politician Margareth Menezes.

Be made her film debut in 2018's Black Panther, appearing as Linda, an associate of Erik Killmonger. In 2023, Be made her television debut as Simone Jackson on Daisy Jones & the Six, stating that she drew inspiration from Donna Summer, Diana Ross, and Chaka Khan—as well as lesser-known artists such as Merry Clayton, Linda Clifford, and Claudia Lennear.

== Personal life ==
Be identifies as queer.

== Filmography ==
=== Film ===
Year	Title	Role	Notes
2018	Black Panther	Linda	
2021	White Wedding	Bella	Short film

=== Television ===
Year	Title	Role	Notes
2023	Daisy Jones & the Six	Simone Jackson	Main role, 10 episodes
