= Daisy Jones & the Six =

2023 American drama television miniseries

- Promotional poster
- Genre: Musical drama
- Based on: Daisy Jones & the Six by Taylor Jenkins Reid
- Developed by: Scott Neustadter; Michael H. Weber
- Starring: Riley Keough; Sam Claflin; Camila Morrone; Suki Waterhouse; Will Harrison; Josh Whitehouse; Sebastian Chacon; Nabiyah Be; Tom Wright; Timothy Olyphant
- Opening theme: "Dancing Barefoot" by Patti Smith Group
- Country of origin: United States
- Original language: English
- No. of episodes: 10

Production
- Executive producers: James Ponsoldt; Brad Mendelsohn; Will Graham; Reese Witherspoon; Lauren Neustadter; Scott Neustadter; Michael H. Weber
- Producers: Josie Craven; Taylor Jenkins Reid; Amanda Kay Price
- Running time: 46–66 minutes
- Production companies: Half a Person; Circle of Confusion; Big Indie Pictures; Hello Sunshine; Amazon Studios

Original release
- Network: Amazon Prime Video
- Release: March 3 – March 25, 2023

Daisy Jones & the Six is an American musical drama television miniseries developed by Scott Neustadter and Michael H. Weber, based on the 2019 novel of the same name by Taylor Jenkins Reid. Set in the Los Angeles music scene of the 1970s, the series charts the rise and fall of the fictional titular rock band through a documentary style series of interviews with the members and footage of concerts and recording sessions, complete with vocals by series leads Riley Keough and Sam Claflin. Reid was partly inspired by her experiences growing up and watching Fleetwood Mac performances on television. It also stars Camila Morrone, Suki Waterhouse, Will Harrison, Josh Whitehouse, and Sebastian Chacon as the band members.

Daisy Jones & the Six premiered on Amazon Prime Video on March 3, 2023, and received generally positive reviews from critics. It earned multiple nominations at the 75th Primetime Emmy Awards, including Outstanding Limited Series, Outstanding Lead Actress for Keough, and Outstanding Supporting Actress for Morrone.

== Premise ==
Daisy Jones & the Six follows a rock band in the 1970s from their rise in the LA music scene to becoming one of the most famous bands in the world; the series also explores the reason behind the band's split at the height of their success. (Note: Attributed to many sources.)

== Cast and characters ==
=== Main ===
- Riley Keough as Daisy Jones, the lead singer and songwriter
- Sam Claflin as Billy Dunne, the lead singer, guitarist, and songwriter
- Camila Morrone as Camila Alvarez, Billy's wife and the band's photographer
- Suki Waterhouse as Karen Sirko, the keyboardist
- Will Harrison as Graham Dunne, the lead guitarist and Billy's brother
- Josh Whitehouse as Eddie Roundtree, the bassist
- Sebastian Chacon as Warren Rojas, the drummer
- Nabiyah Be as Simone Jackson, Daisy's old roommate and future disco singer
- Tom Wright as Teddy Price, the producer
- Timothy Olyphant as Rod Reyes, tour manager

=== Recurring ===
- Seychelle Gabriel as Julia Dunne, the interviewer and Billy and Camila's daughter
  - Naya Kodeh portrays Julia as a child.
- Jacqueline Obradors as Lucia, Camila's mother
- Ross Partridge as Don Midleton, a record producer
- Ayesha Harris as Bernie, a disc jockey and Simone's lover

=== Guest ===
- Jack Romano as Chuck Loving, the original bassist for the Dunne Brothers
- Nick Pupo as Jonah Berg, a reporter for Rolling Stone magazine
- Nicole LaLiberte as Jean, Daisy's mother
- Chris Diamantopoulos as Lee Parlin
- Olivia Rose Keegan as Caroline
- Gavin Drea as Nicky Fitzpatrick, Daisy's husband
- Lily Donoghue as Lisa Crowne, an actress who later becomes Warren's wife
- Amanda Fix as Daisy (then known as Margaret) at age 14 (in episode one)

== Episodes ==
No.	Title	Directed by	Teleplay by	Original release date
1	"Track 1: Come and Get It"	James Ponsoldt	Scott Neustadter & Michael H. Weber	March 3, 2023
Twenty years after the dissolution of the famous rock band Daisy Jones & the Six in 1977, its members agree to participate in a documentary about the band's history. Beginning in 1968, the wealthy yet neglected Daisy Jones spends her teenage years at Sunset Strip music clubs and parties. She eventually begins writing her own songs. Meanwhile, in the Hazelwood neighborhood of Pittsburgh, brothers Billy and Graham Dunne form a band called the Dunne Brothers with their friends Eddie Roundtree, Warren Rojas, and Chuck Loving. They find local success, but Chuck eventually leaves for college. Tour manager Rod Reyes advises Billy to move the band to Los Angeles. They do so, along with Billy's girlfriend, Camila Alvarez. Daisy breaks up with a screenwriter who intends to make her his muse. She sings her own song at a nightclub and decides to aim for a music career.
2	"Track 2: I'll Take You There"	James Ponsoldt	Jenny Klein	March 3, 2023
In Los Angeles, the Dunne Brothers rent a house in Laurel Canyon, and keyboardist Karen Sirko joins the band. They spend nine months building an audience but struggle to secure a record deal. The band changes its name to the Six. Daisy moves in with aspiring disco singer Simone Jackson and takes a job waitressing. While performing at a club, Daisy attracts the attention of music producer Teddy Price, but she refuses his offer to "shape" her career. After a chance meeting, the Six audition for Teddy, and he signs them. The band records a debut album, and shortly before they embark on a tour, Camila tells Billy that she is pregnant; the pair get married that night. While on tour, Billy descends into drug and alcohol abuse and cheats on Camila with groupies. Although heartbroken, she insists that he be around to support their child. When Camila gives birth, Billy cannot bring himself to see his newborn daughter at the hospital; Teddy takes him to rehab instead. Daisy records her first song and leaves it on Teddy's doorstep as a present.
3	"Track 3: Someone Saved My Life Tonight"	James Ponsoldt	Nora Kirkpatrick & Will Graham	March 3, 2023
Billy, now out of rehab and sober, decides to quit the band in order to be a dedicated father to his infant daughter, Julia. However, he is soon convinced to rejoin the Six. Teddy begins mentoring Daisy, but she struggles to write on demand. Billy writes a new song titled "Look at Us Now (Honeycomb)", and despite the record label rejecting it, Teddy sees its potential. He brings Daisy into the studio to rewrite the song into a duet. Billy is reluctant at first but eventually relents, and the recording session proves successful. Meanwhile, Simone is sexually harassed by a male record producer, but her spirits are lifted when she makes a connection with a woman named Bernie from New York City. Graham pines for Karen, but she resists mixing work with any serious romance.
4	"Track 4: I Saw the Light"	James Ponsoldt	Stacy Traub	March 10, 2023
"Look at Us Now (Honeycomb)" becomes a huge hit. The band and Daisy are invited to perform at a music festival in Hawaii, much to Billy's chagrin. Despite him planning to introduce her after the third song to perform their duet, she storms the stage early and receives praise from the audience. Billy, feeling threatened, tells the press that Daisy was a one-time collaborator. Simone learns that the record producer who harassed her took her vocal track and had another performer lip sync to it. Daisy persuades her to move to New York to pursue her music career and be with Bernie. Feeling lonely despite her newfound success, Daisy breaks into her childhood home, is arrested, and is bailed out by Karen. Talks arise of Daisy officially joining the Six, though Billy protests the idea. Camila invites Daisy to a party, and during a blackout, Daisy joins the Six in a musical number with the guests. Shortly before the power returns, Graham kisses Karen, but she kindly rejects his advances. Camila helps Billy see that Daisy is exactly what the Six need to become superstars.
5	"Track 5: Fire"	James Ponsoldt	Scott Neustadter	March 10, 2023
Daisy officially becomes a member of the Six, and the band goes into the studio to record their next album. Teddy instructs Billy and Daisy to write together. They initially clash but bond when it is revealed they both had difficult childhoods. Daisy reveals her parents did not tell her that they moved away, which was why she was arrested for breaking into her childhood home. Billy confesses his father was a deadbeat who abandoned the family. They also realize that they make each other better songwriters, but Billy is worried about Daisy's drug usage. As Graham pursues another woman, Karen grows jealous, leading to her and Graham becoming a couple in secret. Billy and Daisy write the song "Let Me Down Easy", which impresses everyone. The other band members appreciate that Daisy has pushed Billy into letting everyone contribute something to the recordings.
6	"Track 6: Whatever Gets You Thru the Night"	Nzingha Stewart	Charmaine DeGraté & Will Graham	March 10, 2023
The band continues working on their new album, Aurora. Daisy and Billy become increasingly flirtatious, while Camila begins to feel neglected by Billy. Enlisted by Teddy to write an article about the band, Rolling Stone reporter Jonah Berg asks Billy about his and Daisy's relationship, which Billy asserts is not real. When Jonah relays this to Daisy, she is heartbroken and goes on a drug binge while the band is in the studio waiting for her. When Daisy returns to the studio, she is presented with a song Billy wrote about her, "More Fun to Miss", and she and Billy fight over their feelings, leading to a kiss. At the Aurora photoshoot, Billy learns that Daisy informed Jonah about his rehab stint. Karen urges Graham to keep their romance a secret, fearing she will be known merely as his girlfriend. When Daisy writes "Regret Me" about him and convinces the band to record it for the album, Billy divulges Daisy's struggle with addiction to Jonah in exchange for omitting his rehab story. Camila runs into Eddie at a bar; they leave together, and she does not return home until midnight. Daisy, angered by the article, impulsively flies to Greece.
7	"Track 7: She's Gone"	Will Graham	Susan Coyne	March 17, 2023
In 1975, in New York City, Simone and club DJ Bernie begin a romance. They also work together, and Simone becomes a successful disco singer on the gay club circuit over the next two years. However, she is afraid to publicly show affection towards Bernie due to them being a lesbian couple. Daisy summons Simone and Bernie to the Greek island of Hydra. There, they find her rushing into marriage with a wealthy Irish nobleman named Nicky Fitzpatrick, who is initially unaware of Daisy's fame as the lead singer of a rock band. Despite making the cover of Rolling Stone, Daisy confesses to Simone that she wants to abandon her career in favor of a new life with Nicky. Simone and Bernie profess their love for each other and dance together at the wedding reception. The day after the wedding, Simone chides Daisy for squandering her talent and being selfish, and the two fight. Nicky, realizing Daisy needs her career to emotionally thrive, accompanies her back to Los Angeles.
8	"Track 8: Looks Like We Made It"	Nzingha Stewart	Jihan Crowther & Liz Koe	March 17, 2023
Daisy, with Nicky in tow, reunites with the Six in time for the Aurora tour. She and Billy are still angry at each other over the Rolling Stone article. The tour, managed by Rod Reyes, is so successful that it is expanded. Eddie talks to Camila about their night together, but she does not want to be unfaithful again. After Eddie and Warren tease Graham for not sleeping with groupies, Karen reveals her and Graham's relationship. As the tour continues, Daisy and Nicky increasingly abuse drugs. Billy and Nicky come to blows over the situation. An intoxicated Daisy injures herself on stage but soldiers on and sings "Look at Us Now" a cappella. Billy, who has refused to play the song on tour, storms off. Later that night, Billy and Rod find Daisy overdosed in her hotel suite. While Rod calls a private doctor, Nicky flees the scene before Daisy slowly regains consciousness in Billy's arms.
9	"Track 9: Feels Like the First Time"	Nzingha Stewart	Judalina Neira	March 24, 2023
Enraged at Nicky's abandonment, Daisy orders him to leave. The Six proceed with the tour and successfully perform at several stops. Daisy cuts back heavily on drug use and reconnects with Billy after admitting she needs help. Karen tells Graham she is pregnant but does not want to keep the baby. After the band performs on Saturday Night Live, Warren begins dating the night's celebrity guest host, and Teddy suffers a heart attack. Meanwhile, Simone is hesitant to sign a record deal as the label expects her to hide her sexuality. Simone rushes to the hospital after hearing of Teddy's heart attack, and she and Daisy make amends. On the band's hometown stop in Pittsburgh, Daisy and Billy confess mutual feelings, but Billy rebuffs the prospect of a relationship out of loyalty to Camila. Camila accompanies Karen to an abortion clinic but subsequently catches Billy and Daisy in an emotionally intimate moment. During the concert, Billy takes one of Eddie's solos. The next day, the group resentfully departs Pittsburgh for Chicago.
10	"Track 10: Rock 'n' Roll Suicide"	Nzingha Stewart	Harris Danow	March 24, 2023
Tensions arise between the members as the band prepares to play a sold-out show in Chicago, unaware that this would be their final performance. Earlier that day, Camila confronts Billy about his feelings for Daisy. Tired of being constantly sidelined, Eddie tells Billy that he is leaving the band and admits his fling with Camila; Billy punches him and begs Camila to come to the show, after which he relapses. Karen admits the abortion to an upset Graham. Before the show, Billy and Daisy kiss, but she is concerned when she realizes he is intoxicated. Graham confesses his love for Karen, who lies to him that she does not reciprocate in order not to keep him from the family life he wishes for. Daisy urges Billy to make amends with Camila before leading a performance of "Look at Us Now" as an encore. The next day, the band goes their separate ways. It is revealed that the documentary interviewer is a grown-up Julia and that Camila had recently died due to a longtime illness. Julia shows Billy and Daisy footage of Camila encouraging them to contact each other. Billy knocks on Daisy's door, and she opens it with a smile.

== Production ==
=== Development ===
The series was announced on July 25, 2019. The series was adapted for television by Scott Neustadter and Michael H. Weber, who serve as executive producers alongside Reese Witherspoon and Lauren Neustadter. Taylor Jenkins Reid, the author of the novel, also produces the series. Production companies involved in the series are Hello Sunshine, Circle of Confusion and Amazon Studios.

=== Casting ===
In mid November 2019, it was announced that Riley Keough and Camila Morrone had joined the cast of the series. In February 2020, Sam Claflin, Suki Waterhouse, Nabiyah Be, Will Harrison, Josh Whitehouse, and Sebastian Chacon joined the cast of the series. In October 2021, Tom Wright and Jacqueline Obradors were cast in starring and recurring capacity, respectively. The following November, Timothy Olyphant joined the series in a recurring role.

=== Filming ===
The series was originally supposed to start production in April 2020, but was postponed to 2021 due to the COVID-19 pandemic. It began filming in late September 2021 and wrapped in early May 2022 in New Orleans.

== Music ==
The single "Regret Me" from the fictional band in the series, Daisy Jones & the Six, was released on January 25, 2023. The second single "Look at Us Now (Honeycomb)" was released on February 15, 2023. A full-length album, Aurora, was released by Atlantic Records on March 3, 2023. The album's lead vocals were performed by Riley Keough and Sam Claflin. It was composed, performed, and produced by Blake Mills, with additional production by Tony Berg and in collaboration with musicians such as Chris Weisman, Jackson Browne, Marcus Mumford, and Phoebe Bridgers.

== Release ==
The limited series was released on Amazon Prime Video on March 3, 2023, with the first three episodes available immediately. The first episode was shown in US theaters for one night only to Amazon Prime members on March 1, 2023.

== Reception ==
=== Critical response ===
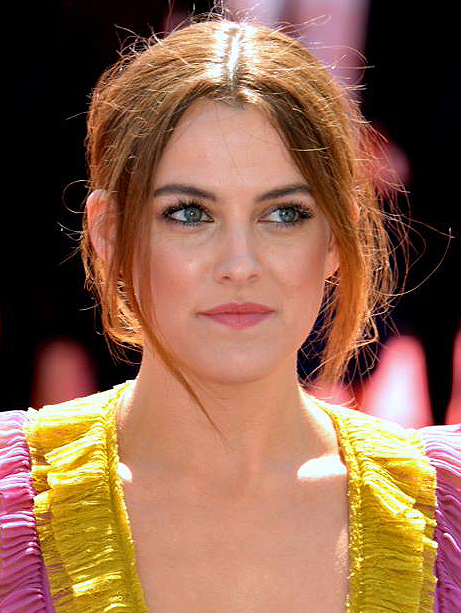
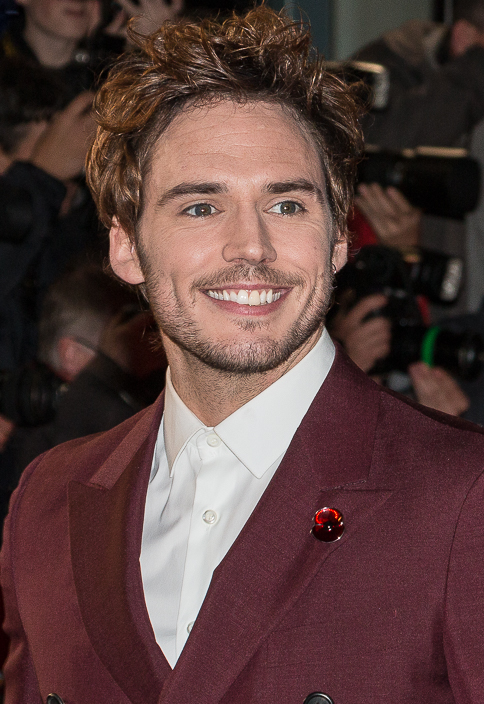
The performances of Riley Keough and Sam Claflin as Daisy Jones and Billy Dunne, respectively, garnered critical acclaim.

The review aggregator website Rotten Tomatoes reported a 69% approval rating with an average rating of 6.7/10, based on 107 critic reviews. The website's critics consensus reads, "Daisy Jones & the Six comes up short at evoking the rockstar credentials that were implied on the page, but the lively duet of Riley Keough and Sam Claflin give this adaptation enough verve to occasionally bring the house down." Metacritic, which uses a weighted average, assigned a score of 62 out of 100 based on 38 critics, indicating "generally favorable reviews".

Critics praised the performances of the ensemble cast and music. Nina Metz of the Chicago Tribune wrote, "Musically, Keough and Claflin are a good match. She has a strong, clear voice that bolsters their harmonies, but he can hold his own too, and they're credible as performers. [Keough] looks at home on stage and finds a way to channel some of [Stevie] Nicks' physicality and flowy-wispy stagewear without mimicking her outright," while Darren Franich of Entertainment Weekly commented Keough "excels at self-destructive self-confidence".

Reviews were critical of the show's pacing, writing, and documentary framing device. Writing for Vulture, Roxana Hadadi said, "For all the series' delights—the chemistry between Sam Claflin and Riley Keough, the constant scene-stealing by Camila Morrone, the fizziness of the original songs—there's an unignorable smallness throughout ... The series shrinks Reid's novel (partially inspired by the infamously stormy relationship between Fleetwood Mac's Stevie Nicks and Lindsey Buckingham) into a claustrophobic love triangle mostly uninterested in looking beyond its three points, and indifferent to the paranoia and exhilaration of the 1970s. Creative process is recurrently pushed aside for romantic pining, and there's no imagination for artistic motivation past jealousy and lust." Hadadi opined "the series' best scenes are the ones that plunge into how they developed their sound, wrote their songs, and complemented or challenged each other."

Others lamented the underdevelopment of the other band members as characters. Metz wrote, "The series is primarily the Billy and Daisy show, with the other members of the band relegated to supporting status, including Suki Waterhouse as a character based on Christine McVie. While the keyboard can clearly be heard on the tracks, the character's actual musical contributions are rendered invisible." Metz added, "That's part of the fun of going behind the scenes. What does creative collaboration look like? Is it too boring to film? Maybe. But I would argue Peter Jackson's 2021 Get Back, the documentary made from old footage of The Beatles working on their final album, suggests the opposite." She conceded "the episodes have a cumulative power, even if the storytelling often feels like it's cutting corners rather than digging in".

Coralie Kraft of The New Yorker admired Keough's performance, but disparaged the titular character of Daisy Jones and her relationship with Billy Dunne. Kraft describes Daisy as a "depressingly one-dimensional" character akin to the Manic Pixie Dream Girl archetype: "A sexually liberated woman, she exists as a foil to male responsibility: she'll teach Billy the value of an unfettered approach while also instructing him in the risks of his own desires. He is drawn to her because she helps him understand himself. She is the caretaker of his catharsis and little else". Kraft ultimately concludes, saying: "For all its posturing about Daisy's independence and creative drive, Daisy Jones is myopically obsessed with the will-they-won't-they dynamic between Daisy and her tortured paramour, and within that dynamic, Billy retains all the power; the show's dramatic fulcrum rests on his decisions".

TVLine gave Keough an honorable mention as the "Performer of the Week" for the eighth episode "Track 8: Looks Like We Made It", writing "Keough's Daisy was a captivating mix of blazing passion and tragic insecurities. What made the actress' portrayal even more impressive was that she packed those complicated emotions into multiple song numbers in which Daisy's state of mind broke down a bit more with each stop in the band's tour".

For the final episode "Track 10: Rock 'n' Roll Suicide", Claflin also received an honorable mention. TVLine praised Claflin's "heartachingly vulnerable" performance and his ability to "switch to wild abandon as Billy [embraces] his worst qualities, falling into booze and oozing recklessness on stage with Daisy".

== Accolades ==
Year	Award	Category	Nominee(s)	Result	Ref.
2023	MTV Movie & TV Awards	Best Performance in a Show	Riley Keough	Nominated	
2023	MTV Movie & TV Awards	Best Kiss	Riley Keough and Sam Claflin	Nominated	
2023	MTV Movie & TV Awards	Best Musical Moment	"Look at Us Now (Honeycomb)"	Nominated	
2023	Golden Trailer Awards	Best Drama for a TV/Streaming Series (Trailer/Teaser/TV Spot)	"Look at Us Now" (Project X/AV)	Nominated	
2023	Golden Trailer Awards	Best WildPosts for a TV/Streaming Series	Daisy Jones & the Six (The Refinery)	Nominated	
2023	Hollywood Creative Alliance TV Awards	Best Streaming Limited or Anthology Series	Daisy Jones & the Six	Nominated	
2023	Hollywood Creative Alliance TV Awards	Best Actor in a Streaming Limited or Anthology Series or Movie	Sam Claflin	Nominated	
2023	Hollywood Creative Alliance TV Awards	Best Actress in a Streaming Limited or Anthology Series or Movie	Riley Keough	Nominated	
2023	Hollywood Creative Alliance TV Awards	Best Supporting Actor in a Streaming Limited or Anthology Series or Movie	Timothy Olyphant	Nominated	
2023	Hollywood Creative Alliance TV Awards	Best Supporting Actress in a Streaming Limited or Anthology Series or Movie	Camila Morrone	Nominated	
2023	Primetime Emmy Awards	Outstanding Limited or Anthology Series	Daisy Jones & the Six	Nominated	
2023	Primetime Emmy Awards	Outstanding Lead Actress in a Limited or Anthology Series or Movie	Riley Keough	Nominated	
2023	Primetime Emmy Awards	Outstanding Supporting Actress in a Limited or Anthology Series or Movie	Camila Morrone	Nominated	
2023	Primetime Creative Arts Emmy Awards	Outstanding Production Design for a Narrative Period or Fantasy Program (One Hour or More)	Jessica Kender, Brian Grego, Lisa Clark, and Andi Brittan (for "Track 10: Rock 'n' Roll Suicide")	Nominated	
2023	Primetime Creative Arts Emmy Awards	Outstanding Casting for a Limited or Anthology Series or Movie	Justine Arteta, Kim Davis-Wagner	Nominated	
2023	Primetime Creative Arts Emmy Awards	Outstanding Period Costumes	Denise Wingate, Derek Sullivan (for "Track 8: Looks Like We Made It")	Won	
2023	Primetime Creative Arts Emmy Awards	Outstanding Makeup (Non-Prosthetic)	Rebecca Wachtel, Sherri Simmons, RJ McCasland, Kim Perrodin, Darla Edin (for "Track 10: Rock 'n' Roll Suicide")	Nominated	
2023	Primetime Creative Arts Emmy Awards	Outstanding Music Supervision	Frankie Pine (for "Track 8: Looks Like We Made It")	Nominated	
2023	Primetime Creative Arts Emmy Awards	Outstanding Sound Mixing for a Limited or Anthology Series or Movie	Lindsay Alvarez, Mathew Waters, Chris Welcker, Mike Poole (for "Track 10: Rock 'n' Roll Suicide")	Won	
2023	Set Decorators Society of America Awards	Best Achievement in Décor/Design of a Television Movie or Limited Series	Lisa Clark, Andi Brittan, Jessica Kender	Won	
2023	Television Critics Association Awards	Outstanding Achievement in Movies, Miniseries or Specials	Daisy Jones & the Six	Nominated	
2023	Celebration of Cinema and Television	Breakthrough Actress – Television	Camila Morrone	Won	
2024	Art Directors Guild Awards	Excellence in Production Design for a Television Movie or Limited Series	Jessica Kender	Nominated	
2024	Artios Awards	Outstanding Achievement in Casting – Limited Series	Justine Arteta, Kim Davis-Wagner, Makis Gazis, Jane Flowers	Nominated	
2024	Cinema Audio Society Awards	Outstanding Achievement in Sound Mixing for Non-Theatrical Motion Pictures or Limited Series	Chris Welcker, Lindsey Alvarez, Mathew Waters, Mike Poole, Chris Navarro, James B. Howe (for "Track 10: Rock n' Roll Suicide")	Nominated	
2024	Costume Designers Guild Awards	Excellence in Period Television	Denise Wingate (for "Track 8: Looks Like We Made It")	Nominated	
2024	Directors Guild of America Awards	Outstanding Directing – Miniseries or Movies for Television	Nzingha Stewart (for "Track 10: Rock 'n' Roll Suicide")	Nominated	
2024	Grammy Awards	Best Compilation Soundtrack For Visual Media	AURORA	Nominated	
2024	Golden Globe Awards	Best Limited or Anthology Series or Television Film	Daisy Jones & The Six	Nominated	
2024	Golden Globe Awards	Best Actress – Miniseries or Television Film	Riley Keough	Nominated	
2024	Golden Globe Awards	Best Actor – Miniseries or Television Film	Sam Claflin	Nominated	
2024	Critics' Choice Television Awards	Best Limited Series	Daisy Jones & the Six	Nominated	
2024	Critics' Choice Television Awards	Best Supporting Actress in a Limited Series or Movie Made for Television	Camila Morrone	Nominated	
2024	Golden Reel Awards	Outstanding Achievement in Music Editing – Broadcast Long Form	Amber Funk, Mike Poole (for "Track 10: Rock 'n' Roll Suicide")	Nominated	
2024	Make-Up Artists and Hair Stylists Guild Awards	Best Period and/or Character Make-Up in a Television Series, Limited, Miniseries, or Movie for Television	Rebecca Wachtel, RJ McCasland, Sherri Simmons, Michele Tyminski Schoenbach	Nominated	
2024	Hollywood Creative Alliance Creative Arts TV Awards	Best Casting in a Limited Series or TV Movie	Daisy Jones & the Six	Nominated	
2024	Hollywood Creative Alliance Creative Arts TV Awards	Best Original Song	"Look at Us Now"	Nominated	
2024	Hollywood Creative Alliance Creative Arts TV Awards	Best Original Song	"The River"	Nominated	
2024	Producers Guild of America Awards	David L. Wolper Award for Outstanding Producer of Limited or Anthology Series Television	Daisy Jones & the Six	Nominated	
2024	USC Scripter Awards	Best Adapted Screenplay – Television	Scott Neustadter (for "Track 5: Fire")	Nominated	
2024	Women's Image Network Awards	Outstanding Made For Television Movie / Limited Series	Daisy Jones & The Six	Nominated	
2024	Women's Image Network Awards	Outstanding Actress Made For Television Movie / Limited Series	Riley Keough	Won	
2024	Writers Guild of America Awards	Limited Series	Susan Coyne, Jihan Crowther, Harris Danow, Charmaine DeGraté, Will Graham, Nora Kirkpatrick, Jenny Klein, Liz Koe, Judalina Neira, Scott Neustadter, Stacy Traub, Michael H. Weber	Nominated	

=== Audience viewership ===
Within hours of release, Daisy Jones & the Six hit No. 1 on Amazon Prime Video's Top 10 list in the U.S. According to Parrot Analytics' data, the series had an "impressive" 49% increase in demand and became the fourth-most streamed TV series across all U.S. platforms.

== See also ==
- 1970s nostalgia
