= Malibu Rising =

2021 novel by Taylor Jenkins Reid

- Author: Taylor Jenkins Reid
- Language: English
- Publisher: Ballantine Books
- Publication date: June 1, 2021
- Publication place: United States
- Media type: Print (hardcover and paperback)
- Pages: 369
- ISBN: 978-1524798659

Malibu Rising is a historical fiction novel by Taylor Jenkins Reid, published June 1, 2021 by Ballantine Books. The book was a New York Times best seller. It is currently being adapted by Hulu into a television series.

== Plot ==
The prologue opens with Malibu's history of fires. The Malibu fire of 1983 began on August 27, the day of Nina Riva's annual summer party. The person who started the fire remains a mystery.

Nina Riva wakes alone at 7 in the morning. Her husband recently left her after having an affair, and she dreads people asking her about him that night at the party. Nina has two brothers: Jay, a professional surfer, and Hud, a surf photographer, who work together on occasion. Their youngest sibling is their sister Kit, who is going into her junior year of college.

In a flashback to 1956, the siblings' parents, June and Mick Riva, meet in Malibu just as Mick was beginning his career as a singer. After he and June have Nina and Jay, a woman appears at June's door while Mick was on tour—revealing that Mick is the father of her son Hud, whom she leaves with June. June forgives Mick for his affair, but he eventually leaves her to marry another woman. After that marriage ends in divorce, Mick returns to June. They soon remarry and have Kit. However, Mick soon leaves again. June increasingly drinks while her children largely take care of themselves. June dies by drowning, and Nina becomes her siblings' guardian. Eventually, she is discovered surfing and becomes a professional model, using the money to support her siblings. She marries professional tennis player Brandon Randall in 1982.

In the present, Jay seeks the attention of Lara, a woman he recently slept with, feeling comforted by her belief that he will be okay despite his newly diagnosed heart condition. She is the only one he has told, so he confirms that she will be at the party. Kit hopes to kiss a boy for the first time at the party. Hud agonizes over how he will tell Jay about his relationship with Ashley, who is Jay's ex-girlfriend. Nina and her siblings meet at the restaurant for lunch and go surfing together.

Just before seven, Brandon appears and tells Nina that he wants to come home. Brandon begs Nina to take him back, professing his love publicly and forcing her to say "yes." At the party, Nina realizes Ashley and Hud are sleeping together, as Ashley tells Hud that she is pregnant. Nina also meets Casey, a young woman wandering around the party, who turns out to also be Mick's daughter.

Kit kisses Ricky Esposito and immediately realizes that she isn't interested in kissing men. She comes out to Ricky. In Hud's truck, Jay tells Lara he's in love with her. They start to have sex, but Jay discovers nude photos of Ashley in the glove compartment. Afterward, he reiterates that he loves Lara, who doesn't feel the same way. Enraged, Jay goes to find Hud, who decides to tell Jay the truth — Hud will be a father.

Brandon's mistress, Carrie Soto, arrives, and Nina realizes she doesn't have to blandly accept everything that happens to her. Nina tells Brandon to leave.

Mick arrives to find Jay and Hud fighting, and he breaks them apart. He and his children talk. Mick wants to be a part of their lives again. All are suspicious, and Nina says that Mick hasn't really changed. Her siblings are shocked by her bluntness. Even though Mick is sorry for what he's done, his love still doesn't mean much to Nina. Mick admits that he doesn't remember whether he slept with Casey's mother. He also explains that he wasn't capable of being a parent, angering Nina because she didn't get to decide whether she was capable after June died. She just did what she needed to do for her family, even though she'd rather be surfing in Portugal. Mick decides to leave his children alone. He goes back to the house and handles the cops who were called when the party got out of hand.

The others accept Casey as part of their family and encourage Nina to go to Portugal. She agrees to leave, realizing they can take care of themselves. Jay forgives Hud, who proposes to Ashley. The brothers also agree to help Kit become a professional surfer.

As Mick leaves, he flicks his cigarette into the dry grass, lighting the fire that will destroy Nina's house and ignite the coast. However, just as each Riva child will rebuild their life, Malibu will be born anew.

== Reception ==
Malibu Rising was a New York Times and IndieBound best seller.

The book received a starred review from Booklist, as well as positive reviews from Kirkus, Publishers Weekly, The Irish Times, Parade, Elle, and The Washington Post. The New York Times Book Review gave it a mixed review. Booklist gave the audiobook a starred review.

In June 2021, Jenna Bush Hager selected Malibu Rising for the Read with Jenna Book Club on the Today Show.

Malibu Rising landed on "best of" lists from The Washington Post, TIME, PopSugar, and Teen Vogue.

The book also won Best Historical Fiction of 2021 for the Goodreads Choice Awards.

== Adaptation ==
Before the book was released, Hulu purchased the rights to adapt it into a television miniseries. Liz Tigelaar will be the executive producer as well as Taylor Jenkins Reid, and Amy Talkington is writing the screen adaptation.
