= The Seven Husbands of Evelyn Hugo =

2017 novel by Taylor Jenkins Reid

- First edition
- Author: Taylor Jenkins Reid
- Language: English
- Genre: Historical fiction
- Publisher: Atria Books
- Publication date: June 13, 2017
- Publication place: United States
- Media type: Print (hardcover & paperback), audiobook, e-book
- Pages: 400
- ISBN: 9781501139246

The Seven Husbands of Evelyn Hugo is a historical drama novel by American novelist Taylor Jenkins Reid, published by Atria Books in 2017. It tells the story of the fictional Old Hollywood star Evelyn Hugo, who, at age 79, gives a final interview to unknown journalist Monique Grant.

The novel was nominated for a Goodreads Choice Award for Best Historical Fiction in 2017.

== Book structure ==
The book is split into seven parts that are all named after Hugo's husbands in order to chronicle her life during the marriages and affairs she experiences; in addition, the titles feature adjectives to emphasize Hugo's feelings and opinions towards them. For instance, "Brilliant, kindhearted, tortured Harry Cameron" or "gullible Mick Riva".

== Plot ==
Evelyn Hugo, a reclusive former Hollywood star, announces the auction of her collection of famous gowns to raise money for a breast cancer charity in honor of her late daughter. She specifically requests magazine reporter Monique Grant to interview her about the auction. Monique, who has no personal connection to her, is confused about why Evelyn insists she conduct the interview. When they meet, Evelyn reveals that she isn't interested in giving an interview to Monique's magazine; instead, she wants Monique to write her biography. When pressed for an explanation as to why, Evelyn only tells her that she found Monique through an article that she had written about assisted suicide, and otherwise promises that she will answer all of Monique's questions once she is done recounting her story. Monique accepts, and Evelyn begins sharing the events of her life.

Poor Ernie Diaz

Evelyn meets her first husband, Ernie Diaz, at age 14. She then marries him in order to reach Hollywood and escape her abusive father in Hell's Kitchen, Manhattan. Her beauty is already exceptional, with a very slim figure and outstanding big breasts. She reckons the effect it has on men, who already preyed on her in her teens, can be a key asset to get out and climb up the ladder. So she uses that effect boldly and cleverly; for instance, she hangs out at a café frequented by influential or famous Hollywood people in the hope of being noticed. Harry Cameron, a young Sunset Studios producer, notices her, and the two later become close friends. Evelyn seduces a Sunset executive in order to advance her career and divorces Ernie after the studio decides to set her up with popular actors to increase their publicity.

Goddamn Don Adler

Evelyn falls in love with and marries actor Don Adler, whom she believes to be the first true love of her life. Shortly after they marry, Don begins physically abusing her.

In a film adaptation of Little Women, Evelyn, now 21, stars opposite fellow actress Celia St. James. Evelyn is initially jealous of Celia's talent, but they soon become friends. At a party, another actress, Ruby Reilly, tells Evelyn that Celia is a lesbian. Evelyn confronts Celia to ask if this is true, and the two share a passionate kiss. Evelyn discovers that Don has been unfaithful to her, at which point he divorces her and sabotages her career by getting studio executives to blacklist her.

Gullible Mick Riva

Evelyn and Celia become lovers, unbeknownst to the public. To revive her career, Evelyn goes to Paris and stars in a racy film by French director Max Girard. While attending a concert held by singer Mick Riva, Evelyn unthinkingly holds Celia's hand for a moment; a concert-goer sees this, and rumors begin to spread in tabloids about Evelyn and Celia's relationship. To distract the press, Evelyn goes to Las Vegas with Mick and convinces him that she will not have sex outside of marriage, at which point they get married. The marriage is annulled the next day, but weeks later Evelyn discovers that she is pregnant from the encounter. She has an abortion in Tijuana, but Celia feels betrayed that Evelyn slept with Mick and leaves her. The two do not speak for five years.

Clever Rex North

After starring in an adaptation of Anna Karenina, Evelyn marries her co-star, Rex North, solely to generate publicity; they are not romantically interested in each other. They stay married for a few years, but after Rex impregnates his girlfriend, Joy, Evelyn spreads a rumor that she and Harry Cameron were having an affair. In reality, Harry is secretly dating football quarterback John Braverman, who is married to Celia.

Brilliant, Kindhearted, Tortured Harry Cameron

Evelyn and Celia reunite and reconcile. Evelyn marries Harry, and they move to Manhattan to live close to Celia and John, posing as two heterosexual couples. During the Stonewall Riots, the four of them agree to start secretly funding LGBT pioneers since they are unable to publicly participate in protests. After several idyllic years, Harry suggests that he and Evelyn have a child, and Evelyn agrees. With Celia's blessing, they have a daughter named Connor.

In her late 30s, Evelyn stars in another Max Girard movie, in which she agrees to an explicit sex scene opposite Don Adler. Realizing that she should have asked Celia for her blessing to film such a scene with her ex-husband, Evelyn confesses after the fact, at which point Celia leaves her again. John Braverman then dies of a heart attack, and a heartbroken Harry becomes an alcoholic.

Disappointing Max Girard

Max Girard pursues Evelyn, and she agrees to marry him, but she quickly discovers he does not truly love her as a person, only the sex symbol she has become. She stays married to him for six years before falling out with him and reuniting with Celia. She learns that Celia has emphysema and fewer than ten years to live. Celia suggests that Evelyn marry her older brother, Robert; this way, Evelyn can manage Celia's estate after Celia dies. Together, they prepare to move to Spain with Connor and Harry to live out Celia's final years in relative obscurity and peace. Harry tells Evelyn he has fallen in love again and suggests his lover move to Spain with them and marry Celia as cover.

Before leaving, Evelyn discovers the scene of a car accident outside Harry's home. Inside the car, she finds a severely wounded Harry as well as an unknown dead passenger. To protect Harry from being convicted of drunk driving, Evelyn moves the passenger into the driver's seat. Harry dies at the hospital, leaving Evelyn and Connor to grieve.

Agreeable Robert Jamison

Evelyn, Celia, and Connor move to Spain along with Celia's brother Robert, whom Evelyn marries. 10 years later, Celia dies at age 61, and Robert dies a few years after. Connor is diagnosed with breast cancer at age 39 and dies 18 months later. At this point, Evelyn tells Monique her account and reveals that the passenger in the car with Harry was Monique's deceased father, James Grant. By staging the scene as she had, Evelyn allowed Monique and her mother, Angela, to believe that James had died driving drunk. Evelyn gives Monique a letter James wrote to Harry, in which he explains his love for him but tells him he cannot move to Spain with him or marry Celia, as Angela and Monique are his family.

Though initially furious, Monique demands to know when she can publish the book. Evelyn tells her that she, too, has breast cancer, and intends for the book to be published after she dies. Monique parts ways with Evelyn, but soon realizes that Evelyn has revealed all of this because she intends to end her life herself. She considers calling the authorities, but decides that it should be Evelyn's choice if she wants to die. The next day, it is reported that Evelyn died from an accidental overdose.

Monique eventually publishes the introduction to her biography about Evelyn, finally disclosing that the actress was bisexual and that the true love of her life was none of her seven husbands, but rather her co-star and fellow actress, Celia St. James.

== Background ==
Reid released the book cover and an excerpt of the book in Entertainment Weekly on December 6, 2016.

According to Reid, Evelyn is loosely based in part on actresses Elizabeth Taylor, who was married eight times to seven different men, and Ava Gardner, who revealed the secrets of her life to a journalist, who published them in Ava Gardner: The Secret Conversations. Reid has also said Rita Hayworth was an influence on Evelyn. Hayworth, whose father was a Spaniard, had a very similar start to Evelyn's and multiple relationships throughout her career. Other influences included Tab Hunter Confidential: The Making of a Movie Star, an autobiography by Tab Hunter that describes what life was like for LGBTQ+ people in Hollywood at the time, and Scandals of Classic Hollywood by Anne Helen Petersen.

== Editions ==
The Seven Husbands of Evelyn Hugo was released in hardcover on June 1, 2017, by Atria Publishing Group. By June 13, the novel was released in paperback, Audible audio, and Kindle edition. The Seven Husbands of Evelyn Hugo was also translated for print into Spanish, Portuguese, Polish, Serbian, Greek, Turkish, Lithuanian, Swedish, Croatian, Czech, French, Slovak, Hungarian, German, Dutch, Italian, Bulgarian, Ukrainian, Russian, Icelandic, Hebrew, Vietnamese and Chinese.

== Adaptations ==
=== Cancelled television adaptation ===
In 2019, Freeform and Fox 21 Television Studios picked up the rights for development. Jennifer Beals and Ilene Chaiken, who worked on The L Word, were to produce the show. Reid was to work on the show as a screenwriter. In June 2021, Reid confirmed in an interview that the rights were no longer owned by Freeform and would be produced on another platform. She said she felt "really good with the direction that it's going in".

=== Film adaptation ===
On March 24, 2022, it was announced that Netflix will be adapting the novel into a feature film with Liz Tigelaar writing and Margaret Chernin executive producing. The film was slated to be directed by Leslye Headland, but in a January 2025 interview with Variety, Headland said she "was no longer working on [the] project." In June 2026, Anna Kendrick was brought in to replace Headland.

== Reception ==
The novel received positive reviews. The Globe and Mail called it "a cinematic tale with hardscrabble roots, staggering highs and sickening lows." The novel was nominated for a Goodreads Choice Award for Best Historical Fiction of 2017, and a finalist for Book of the Month's Book of the Year award in 2017.
