= Daisy Jones & the Six (novel) =

2019 novel by Taylor Jenkins Reid

- First edition cover
- Author: Taylor Jenkins Reid
- Language: English
- Publisher: Ballantine Books
- Publication date: March 5, 2019
- Publication place: United States
- Media type: Print (hardback, paperback)
- Pages: 368
- ISBN: 978-1-5247-9862-8

Daisy Jones & the Six is a historical fiction novel by American author Taylor Jenkins Reid, originally published on March 5, 2019, by Ballantine Books. The novel uses the framework of interviews for an oral history to tell the story of a 1970s band, leading up to their final show and subsequent breakup. It is loosely inspired by Fleetwood Mac and the recording of their 1977 album Rumours.

== Plot structure ==
Daisy Jones & the Six is told in an oral history format, with interviews from the band members being the guiding force of the novel. Additionally, there are relevant emails, song lyrics, and transcripts. Each section is split into years that contain critical events leading up to the band's success and eventual demise.

== Plot ==
An unknown interviewer compiled together video interviews of the band, transcripts of interviews throughout the years, text from books written about the band, and other relevant sources to piece together how a band as successful as Daisy Jones & the Six could fall apart.

=== The Groupie: Daisy Jones (1965–1972) ===
Daisy Jones is born into a wealthy family in Hollywood, but her parents are more concerned with their social status than raising their daughter. At age 14, Daisy begins sneaking into clubs and bars on the Sunset Strip, where she befriends disco pioneer Simone Jackson. At parties, Daisy begins taking drugs and sleeping with older men in the entertainment industry. She becomes annoyed with her lovers stealing her ideas for their own work and begins writing her own music.

=== The Rise of the Six (1966–1972) ===
In Pittsburgh, brothers Billy and Graham Dunne form a band called The Dunne Brothers. They invite drummer Warren Rhodes, rhythm guitarist Chuck Williams, and bassist Pete Loving to join them. They play at small venues, including a wedding where Billy meets Camila Martinez, whom he begins dating. Chuck is drafted for the Vietnam War and temporarily replaced by Pete's younger brother, Eddie. When Chuck dies in Cambodia, Eddie becomes a permanent member of the band.

In 1970, The Dunne Brothers open for a band called The Winters, where they meet keyboardist Karen Sirko (known as Karen Karen). Unhappy with her treatment by The Winters, Karen leaves them to join The Dunne Brothers. The band then decides to change their name to The Six.

When the band begins playing at larger venues, they capture the attention of Rod Reyes, who begins managing them. Their fanbase grows as they play more shows along the East Coast, and they decide to move to Los Angeles to expand further. Although Camila initially hesitates to join the band on their journey and parts ways with Billy, she ultimately accepts his proposal after the band signs a record deal with producer Teddy Price, and she moves to California.

=== It Girl (1972–1974) ===
Daisy begins writing and performing her own music. Her manager, Hank Allen, helps her sign with a record label, but she is disillusioned to find that the label does not want to record her original songs.

=== Debut (1973–1975) ===
The Six move into a house in Los Angeles and begin writing their first album. Its release is successful enough that the band schedules a tour. Just before the tour begins, Camila reveals she is pregnant. She and Billy marry that night.

On tour, Billy begins drinking heavily and doing hard drugs. On a surprise visit, Camila finds him receiving fellatio from another woman. Though upset, she refuses to leave him, and tells him that he can do whatever he wants up until the day their baby is born. Billy continues abusing alcohol and drugs until Camila goes into labor early. At the hospital, Billy learns from Teddy that Camila has had a girl and named her Julia. Not wanting to meet his daughter while drunk and high, Billy goes to rehab.

=== First (1974–1975) ===
Daisy refuses to show up to her recording sessions because they will not let her record her own music. Teddy tells her that none of the songs she has written are finished products, and that she needs to record the album that the label has written for her. Daisy relents and releases her debut album, which garners her some recognition.

=== Seven Eight Nine (1975–1976) ===
Billy returns from rehab determined to be a good father, husband, and band leader. He begins writing songs for The Six's second album. Teddy suggests that one of their songs, "Honeycomb," be made into a duet, and invites Daisy as the female voice on the song. Billy, who wrote the song as a promise to Camila that he will give her the life she wants, is angry when Daisy changes lines that he wrote to be less certain. Despite this, the label believes the song is better with Daisy's contributions, and "Honeycomb" becomes a massive success, peaking at number three on the Billboard Hot 100.

=== The Numbers Tour (1976–1977) ===
The Six embarks on a national tour to support their second album, with Daisy as their opening act. Camila, now pregnant with twin girls, and Julia travel with Billy on tour. Billy finds it increasingly difficult to stay sober, especially around Daisy who regularly drinks and takes drugs. Unbeknownst to the rest of the band, Graham and Karen begin sleeping together.

Daisy, who has been sleeping with Hank, breaks up with him and fires him as her manager, at which point he leaves and takes Daisy's band members with him. Instead of cancelling her opening act, Eddie joins her on stage and plays guitar for her. Billy comes on stage to play "Honeycomb" with Daisy; Eddie resents Billy for taking his guitar from him to do so. In the audience, Rolling Stone journalist Jonah Berg is impressed by their performance and publishes an article encouraging Daisy to join the band.

After debating the pros and cons of Daisy joining The Six, they decide to write one album together as a starting point. Management changes their name to Daisy Jones & the Six.

=== Aurora (1977–1978) ===
After his twins are born, Billy writes a song called "Aurora" about Camila, which he believes is the song the rest of the album should be built around. Daisy and Billy initially struggle to write songs together but eventually become excellent collaborators, with many of the songs they write being inspired by the other. The rest of the band begins experimenting with their musical style, which furthers tension between Billy and Eddie.

Billy and Daisy spend several hours writing and recording together, after which they nearly share a kiss. When the band finishes recording the album, they title it Aurora and temporarily go their separate ways before going back on tour. Daisy travels to Thailand, where she meets an Italian prince, Nicky (Niccolo). She quickly falls for him and they fly to Italy and marry each other.

The band, minus Daisy, returns to the studio to listen to the finished album, at which point it becomes apparent that Billy and Teddy changed a number of things from the original recordings. Daisy finally returns to the United States with Nicky, though his presence and his pill addiction puts her at odds with Billy. Jonah Berg writes another piece about the band and interviews Daisy and Billy. Billy learns that Daisy told Jonah about his stint in rehab; in order to dissuade Jonah from publishing that information, he tells him instead about a better angle for the piece: that he and Daisy hate each other. Aurora later releases to great success.

=== Aurora World Tour (1978–1979) ===
On the subsequent tour, the band takes two tour buses so that Billy and Daisy do not have to interact with each other. As the tour progresses, Daisy and Nicky's drug habits alienate them from the rest of the group. During a break from tour, Daisy nearly overdoses while on a trip to Rome. She tells Nicky she wants a divorce and begins to wind back her use of pills, though she still relies on them. Karen realizes she is pregnant; despite Graham's excitement, she does not want to keep the baby.

After winning a Grammy Award for Record of the Year, Billy and Daisy begin getting along again. During a performance on Saturday Night Live, Daisy realizes she is in love with Billy. Billy realizes that he is falling in love with Daisy, but cannot bring himself to leave Camila. Daisy asks Billy to help her get sober, but when Teddy dies of a sudden heart attack, she abandons the idea. Camila accompanies Karen to get an abortion.

=== Chicago Stadium (July 12, 1979) ===
At a show in Chicago, Billy and Daisy perform "Honeycomb" despite not having played it live in over a year. Daisy sings the original lyrics that Billy wrote, and Billy's love for her is cemented. After the show, Graham and Karen fight over Karen's decision to have an abortion. Graham seeks out Billy for support, but Billy is consumed by the desire to get a drink and rebuffs Graham's attempts to talk. Camila cares for a drug-addled Daisy, and tells her that, while she knows what is going on between Daisy and Billy, Billy will never leave his family. She tells Daisy that she should leave the band, and Daisy agrees. Billy, managing to cut himself off from drinking too much, decides to take a break from touring. Rod cancels the rest of the tour, and Daisy Jones & the Six break up.

It is revealed that the interviewer and author of the book is Julia, Billy and Camila's daughter. She laments that her mother died of heart failure before she finished all the recordings.

=== Then and Now (1979–present) ===
The band never plays another show together. Daisy goes to rehab, gets clean, and adopts two sons. Warren marries an actress, Pete manages his own business in Arizona, and Eddie turns to a career as a record producer. Graham and Karen go their separate ways; Graham marries and has children, while Karen becomes a touring keyboardist and retires in the 1990s. Billy writes songs for pop singers and lives with Camila and their three daughters until her death.

=== One Last Thing Before I Go (November 5, 2012) ===
In an email, Camila requests that her daughters give Billy Daisy's number, implicitly giving the two her blessing to reunite after her death, saying that, at the very least, they owe her a song.

== Background ==
This novel was loosely inspired by Fleetwood Mac and the romance between Stevie Nicks and Lindsey Buckingham. Reid was inspired after watching a 1997 performance by Fleetwood Mac on MTV. She believed that they were still together after seeing how they looked at each other.

"[I]t looked so much like two people in love. And yet, we'll never truly know what lived between them. I wanted to write a story about that, about how the lines between real life and performance can get blurred, about how singing about old wounds might keep them fresh."

== Publication ==
Daisy Jones & the Six was released in hardcover on March 5, 2019, by Ballantine Books. By 2023, it is available in paperback, audiobook, Kindle, large print, and a TV tie-in edition. Daisy Jones & the Six is also translated into Spanish, Portuguese, German, French, Polish, Danish, Italian, Turkish, Dutch, Bulgarian, Lithuanian, Czech, Swedish, Finnish, Romanian, Serbian, Croatian, Hebrew, Russian, Hungarian, Slovak, Ukrainian, Modern Greek, Slovenian, Estonian, Norwegian and Latvian.

== Reception ==
The New York Times called it Reid's "most sophisticated and ambitious novel".

== Television adaptation ==
On July 25, 2019, it was announced that Amazon Studios had ordered a miniseries based on the novel. The series was written by Scott Neustadter and Michael H. Weber and produced with Reese Witherspoon and Reid herself along with Amazon Studios. Filming occurred from September 2021 to May 2022, and the miniseries premiered on Amazon Prime Video on March 3, 2023.

The biggest change is that the show got rid of one of the band members – so the Six was the five band members and Camila. Neustadter said this was so all the characters could be fleshed out and the side characters could have a bigger storyline. Because of this, Simone – who plays a fairly minor role in the book – has more of her own story incorporated. In the book, it is mentioned that she got married then divorced, but that is it. In the show, she has a female partner for most of the show. Additionally, in the show, we see more of Camila's life not centered on Billy. Another big change is the romance between Billy and Daisy. While in the book, their relationship is fairly obvious subtext, in the show, they share two kisses.
