= Goodreads Choice Awards =

Annual book award

- Country: United States (HQ)
- Presented by: Goodreads
- Status: Active
- First award: 2009

The Goodreads Choice Awards is a yearly award program, first launched on Goodreads in 2009.

Winners are determined by users voting on books that Goodreads has nominated or books of their choosing, released in the given year. Most books that Goodreads nominates are from verified Goodreads authors. The final voting round collects the top 10 books from 20 different categories.

== Winners ==
=== 2000s ===
Year	Category	Author	Title
2009	Children's	Jeff Kinney	Diary of a Wimpy Kid: Dog Days
2009	Fantasy	Charlaine Harris	Dead and Gone
2009	Fiction	Kathryn Stockett	The Help
2009	Graphic Novel	Neil Gaiman	Batman: Whatever Happened to the Caped Crusader?
2009	Mystery & Thriller	Stieg Larsson	The Girl Who Played with Fire
2009	Nonfiction	Dave Cullen	Columbine
2009	Romance	Diana Gabaldon	An Echo in the Bone
2009	Science Fiction	Scott Westerfeld	Leviathan
2009	Young Adult Fiction	Sarah Dessen	Along for the Ride
2009	Chick Lit	Nicholas Sparks	The Last Song
2009	Picture Book	Neil Gaiman	Blueberry Girl
2009	Young Adult Series	Suzanne Collins	Catching Fire

=== 2010s ===
Year	Category	Author	Title
2010	Children's & Middle Grade	Jeff Kinney	Diary of a Wimpy Kid: The Ugly Truth
2010	Fantasy	Robert Jordan and Brandon Sanderson	Towers of Midnight
2010	Fiction	Emma Donoghue	Room
2010	Goodreads Debut Author	Rebecca Skloot	The Immortal Life of Henrietta Lacks
2010	Graphic Novel	Stephenie Meyer	Twilight: The Graphic Novel
2010	Historical Fiction	Ken Follett	Fall of Giants
2010	History & Biography	G. J. Meyer	The Tudors
2010	Humor	Christopher Moore	Bite Me: A Love Story
2010	Memoir & Autobiography	Portia de Rossi	Unbearable Lightness
2010	Mystery & Thriller	Stieg Larsson	The Girl Who Kicked the Hornets' Nest
2010	Nonfiction	Rebecca Skloot	The Immortal Life of Henrietta Lacks
2010	Poetry	Matthew Zapruder	Come On All You Ghosts
2010	Romance	J. R. Ward	Lover Mine
2010	Science Fiction	Mira Grant	Feed
2010	Young Adult Fantasy	Suzanne Collins	Mockingjay
2010	Young Adult Fiction	Lauren Oliver	Before I Fall
2010	Cover Art	Lauren Kate	Torment
2010	Paranormal Fantasy	Charlaine Harris	Dead in the Family
2010	Picture Book	Lane Smith	It's a Book
2011	Children's & Middle Grade	Rick Riordan	The Son of Neptune
2011	Fantasy	George R. R. Martin	A Dance with Dragons
2011	Fiction	Haruki Murakami	1Q84
2011	Graphic Novel & Comics	Richelle Mead	Vampire Academy: The Graphic Novel
2011	Historical Fiction	Paula McLain	The Paris Wife
2011	History & Biography	Walter Isaacson	Steve Jobs
2011	Horror	Melissa Marr	Graveminder
2011	Humor	Tina Fey	Bossypants
2011	Memoir & Autobiography	Matthew Logelin	Two Kisses for Maddy: A Memoir of Loss & Love
2011	Mystery & Thriller	Janet Evanovich	Smokin' Seventeen
2011	Nonfiction	Alexandra Robbins	The Geeks Shall Inherit the Earth
2011	Poetry	Billy Collins	Horoscopes for the Dead
2011	Romance	J. R. Ward	Lover Unleashed
2011	Science Fiction	Stephen King	11/22/63
2011	Young Adult Fantasy & Science Fiction	Veronica Roth	Divergent
2011	Young Adult Fiction	Gayle Forman	Where She Went
2011	Food & Cooking	Gwyneth Paltrow	My Father's Daughter
2011	Goodreads Author	Cassandra Clare	City of Fallen Angels
2011	Paranormal Fantasy	Karen Marie Moning	Shadowfever
2011	Picture Book	Weird Al Yankovic	When I Grow Up
2011	Travel & Outdoors	Conor Grennan	Little Princes: One Man's Promise to Bring Home the Lost Children of Nepal
2012	Children's & Middle Grade	Rick Riordan	The Mark of Athena
2012	Fantasy	Stephen King	The Dark Tower: The Wind Through the Keyhole
2012	Fiction	J. K. Rowling	The Casual Vacancy
2012	Graphic Novel & Comics	Robert Kirkman	The Walking Dead, Vol. 16: A Larger World
2012	Historical Fiction	M. L. Stedman	The Light Between Oceans
2012	Horror	Justin Cronin	The Twelve
2012	Humor	Jenny Lawson	Let's Pretend This Never Happened
2012	Memoir & Autobiography	Cheryl Strayed	Wild: From Lost to Found on the Pacific Crest Trail
2012	Mystery & Thriller	Gillian Flynn	Gone Girl
2012	Nonfiction	Susan Cain	Quiet: The Power of Introverts in a World That Can't Stop Talking
2012	Poetry	Mary Oliver	A Thousand Mornings
2012	Romance	E. L. James	Fifty Shades Freed
2012	Science Fiction	Terry Pratchett and Stephen Baxter	The Long Earth
2012	Young Adult Fantasy & Science Fiction	Veronica Roth	Insurgent
2012	Young Adult Fiction	John Green	The Fault in Our Stars
2012	Food & Cooking	Ree Drummond	The Pioneer Woman Cooks: Recipes from an Accidental Country Girl
2012	Goodreads Author	Veronica Roth	Insurgent
2012	Paranormal Fantasy	Deborah Harkness	Shadow of Night
2012	Picture Book	Ian Falconer	Olivia and the Fairy Princesses
2013	Children's & Middle Grade	Rick Riordan	The House of Hades
2013	Fantasy	Neil Gaiman	The Ocean at the End of the Lane
2013	Fiction	Khaled Hosseini	And the Mountains Echoed
2013	Goodreads Debut Author	Emma Chase	Tangled
2013	Graphic Novel & Comics	Kami Garcia, Margaret Stohl, and artist Cassandra Jean	Beautiful Creatures
2013	Historical Fiction	Kate Atkinson	Life After Life
2013	History & Biography	Brian Jay Jones	Jim Henson: The Biography
2013	Horror	Stephen King	Doctor Sleep
2013	Humor	Allie Brosh	Hyperbole & a Half
2013	Memoir & Autobiography	Malala Yousafzai	I am Malala
2013	Mystery & Thriller	Dan Brown	Inferno
2013	Nonfiction	Temple Grandin and Richard Panek	The Autistic Brain: Thinking Across the Spectrum
2013	Poetry	J. R. R. Tolkien	The Fall of Arthur
2013	Romance	J. R. Ward	Lover at Last
2013	Science Fiction	Margaret Atwood	MaddAddam
2013	Young Adult Fantasy & Science Fiction	Veronica Roth	Allegiant
2013	Young Adult Fiction	Rainbow Rowell	Eleanor & Park
2013	Food & Cooking	Tim Federle	Tequila Mockingbird: Cocktails with a Literary Twist
2013	Paranormal Fantasy	Jim Butcher	Cold Days
2013	Picture Book	Drew Daywalt and Oliver Jeffers	The Day the Crayons Quit
2014	Children's & Middle Grade	Rick Riordan	The Blood of Olympus
2014	Fantasy	Deborah Harkness	The Book of Life
2014	Fiction	Rainbow Rowell	Landline
2014	Goodreads Debut Author	Pierce Brown	Red Rising
2014	Graphic Novel & Comics	Zack Whedon, Fábio Moon, and Daniel Dos Santos	Serenity: Leaves on the Wind
2014	Historical Fiction	Anthony Doerr	All the Light We Cannot See
2014	History & Biography	Helen Rappaport	The Romanov Sisters
2014	Horror	Anne Rice	Prince Lestat
2014	Humor	Amy Poehler	Yes Please
2014	Memoir & Autobiography	Esther Earl	This Star Won't Go Out
2014	Mystery & Thriller	Stephen King	Mr. Mercedes
2014	Nonfiction	Marina Keegan	The Opposite of Loneliness
2014	Poetry	Lang Leav	Lullabies
2014	Romance	Diana Gabaldon	Written in My Own Heart's Blood
2014	Science Fiction	Andy Weir	The Martian
2014	Young Adult Fantasy & Science Fiction	Cassandra Clare	City of Heavenly Fire
2014	Young Adult Fiction	E. Lockhart	We Were Liars
2014	Business	Sophia Amoruso	#GIRLBOSS
2014	Food & Cooking	Ina Garten	Make It Ahead: A Barefoot Contessa Cookbook
2014	Picture Book	Mo Willems	The Pigeon Needs a Bath! (I Do Not!)
2015	Children's & Middle Grade	Rick Riordan	The Sword of Summer
2015	Fantasy	Neil Gaiman	Trigger Warning: Short Fictions & Disturbances
2015	Fiction	Harper Lee	Go Set a Watchman
2015	Goodreads Debut Author	Victoria Aveyard	Red Queen
2015	Graphic Novel & Comics	Brian K. Vaughan and Fiona Staples	Saga, Volume 4
2015	Historical Fiction	Kristin Hannah	The Nightingale
2015	History & Biography	Erik Larson	Dead Wake: The Last Crossing of the Lusitania
2015	Horror	Dean Koontz	Saint Odd
2015	Humor	Mindy Kaling	Why Not Me?
2015	Memoir & Autobiography	Connor Franta	A Work in Progress
2015	Mystery & Thriller	Paula Hawkins	The Girl on the Train
2015	Nonfiction	Aziz Ansari and Eric Klinenberg	Modern Romance: An Investigation
2015	Poetry	Trista Mateer	The Dogs I Have Kissed
2015	Romance	Colleen Hoover	Confess
2015	Science Fiction	Pierce Brown	Golden Son
2015	Young Adult Fantasy & Science Fiction	Sarah J. Maas	Queen of Shadows
2015	Young Adult Fiction	Jennifer Niven	All the Bright Places
2015	Food & Cooking	Ree Drummond	The Pioneer Woman Cooks: Dinnertime
2015	Picture Book	Drew Daywalt and Oliver Jeffers	The Day the Crayons Came Home
2015	Science & Technology	John Hargrove	Beneath the Surface: Killer Whales, SeaWorld, and the Truth Beyond Blackfish
2016	Children's & Middle Grade	Rick Riordan	The Hidden Oracle
2016	Fantasy	J. K. Rowling	Harry Potter and the Cursed Child
2016	Fiction	Liane Moriarty	Truly Madly Guilty
2016	Goodreads Debut Author	Alwyn Hamilton	Rebel of the Sands
2016	Graphic Novel & Comics	Sarah Andersen	Adulthood is a Myth
2016	Historical Fiction	Colson Whitehead	The Underground Railroad
2016	History & Biography	William Shatner	Leonard: My Fifty-Year Friendship with a Remarkable Man
2016	Horror	Joe Hill	The Fireman
2016	Humor	Amy Schumer	The Girl with the Lower Back Tattoo
2016	Memoir & Autobiography	Paul Kalanithi	When Breath Becomes Air
2016	Mystery & Thriller	Stephen King	End of Watch
2016	Nonfiction	Lin-Manuel Miranda and Jeremy McCarter	Hamilton: The Revolution
2016	Poetry	Amanda Lovelace	The Princess Saves Herself in This One
2016	Romance	Colleen Hoover	It Ends with Us
2016	Science Fiction	Pierce Brown	Morning Star
2016	Young Adult Fantasy & Science Fiction	Sarah J. Maas	A Court of Mist and Fury
2016	Young Adult Fiction	Ruta Sepetys	Salt to the Sea
2016	Food & Cooking	Chrissy Teigen	Cravings
2016	Picture Book	Mo Willems	The Thank You Book
2016	Science & Technology	Frans De Waal	Are We Smart Enough to Know How Smart Animals Are?
2017	Children's & Middle Grade	Rick Riordan	The Ship of the Dead
2017	Fantasy	J. K. Rowling	Fantastic Beasts and Where to Find Them: The Original Screenplay
2017	Fiction	Celeste Ng	Little Fires Everywhere
2017	Goodreads Debut Author	Angie Thomas	The Hate U Give
2017	Graphic Novel & Comics	Sarah Andersen	Big Mushy Happy Lump
2017	Historical Fiction	Lisa Wingate	Before We Were Yours
2017	History & Biography	Kate Moore	The Radium Girls: The Dark Story of America's Shining Women
2017	Horror	Stephen King and Owen King	Sleeping Beauties
2017	Humor	Lauren Graham	Talking as Fast as I Can: From Gilmore Girls to Gilmore Girls (and Everything in Between)
2017	Memoir & Autobiography	Hillary Rodham Clinton	What Happened
2017	Mystery & Thriller	Paula Hawkins	Into the Water
2017	Nonfiction	Lilly Singh	How to Be a Bawse: A Guide to Conquering Life
2017	Poetry	Rupi Kaur	The Sun and Her Flowers
2017	Romance	Colleen Hoover	Without Merit
2017	Science Fiction	Andy Weir	Artemis
2017	Young Adult Fantasy & Science Fiction	Sarah J. Maas	A Court of Wings and Ruin
2017	Young Adult Fiction	Angie Thomas	The Hate U Give
2017	Food & Cooking	Ree Drummond	The Pioneer Woman Cooks: Come and Get It!
2017	Picture Book	R. J. Palacio	We're All Wonders
2017	Science & Technology	Neil deGrasse Tyson	Astrophysics for People in a Hurry
2018	Children's & Middle Grade	Rick Riordan	The Burning Maze
2018	Fantasy	Madeline Miller	Circe
2018	Fiction	Jojo Moyes	Still Me
2018	Goodreads Debut Author	Tomi Adeyemi	Children of Blood and Bone
2018	Graphic Novel & Comics	Sarah Andersen	Herding Cats
2018	Historical Fiction	Kristin Hannah	The Great Alone
2018	History & Biography	Maxwell King	The Good Neighbor: The Life and Work of Fred Rogers
2018	Horror	Stephen King	Elevation
2018	Humor	Tiffany Haddish	The Last Black Unicorn
2018	Memoir & Autobiography	Tara Westover	Educated
2018	Mystery & Thriller	Stephen King	The Outsider
2018	Nonfiction	Michelle McNamara	I'll Be Gone in the Dark
2018	Poetry	Amanda Lovelace	The Witch Doesn't Burn in This One
2018	Romance	Helen Hoang	The Kiss Quotient
2018	Science Fiction	VE Schwab	Vengeful
2018	Young Adult Fantasy & Science Fiction	Sarah J. Maas	Kingdom of Ash
2018	Young Adult Fiction	Becky Albertalli	Leah on the Offbeat
2018	Best of the Best	Angie Thomas	The Hate U Give
2018	Food & Cooking	Chrissy Teigen and Adeena Sussman	Cravings: Hungry for More
2018	Picture Book	Grace Byers	I Am Enough
2018	Science & Technology	Steve Brusatte	The Rise and Fall of the Dinosaurs
2019	Children's & Middle Grade	Rick Riordan	The Tyrant's Tomb
2019	Debut Novel	Casey McQuiston	Red, White & Royal Blue
2019	Fantasy	Leigh Bardugo	Ninth House
2019	Fiction	Margaret Atwood	The Testaments
2019	Graphic Novel & Comics	Rainbow Rowell and Faith Erin Hicks	Pumpkin Heads
2019	Historical Fiction	Taylor Jenkins Reid	Daisy Jones & The Six
2019	History & Biography	Hallie Rubenhold	The Five
2019	Horror	Stephen King	The Institute
2019	Humor	Ali Wong	Dear Girls
2019	Memoir & Autobiography	Jonathan Van Ness	Over the Top
2019	Mystery & Thriller	Alex Michaelides	The Silent Patient
2019	Nonfiction	Rachel Hollis	Girl, Stop Apologizing
2019	Poetry	Laurie Halse Anderson	Shout
2019	Romance	Casey McQuiston	Red, White & Royal Blue
2019	Science Fiction	Blake Crouch	Recursion
2019	Young Adult Fantasy & Science Fiction	Holly Black	The Wicked King
2019	Young Adult Fiction	Rachael Lippincott	Five Feet Apart
2019	Food & Cooking	Antoni Porowski	Antoni in the Kitchen
2019	Picture Book	Fred Rogers and Luke Flowers	A Beautiful Day in the Neighborhood
2019	Science & Technology	Caitlin Doughty	Will My Cats Eat My Eyeballs?

=== 2020s ===
Year	Category	Author	Title
2020	Children's & Middle Grade	Rick Riordan	The Tower of Nero
2020	Debut Novel	Kiley Reid	Such a Fun Age
2020	Fantasy	Sarah J. Maas	House of Earth and Blood
2020	Fiction	Matt Haig	The Midnight Library
2020	Graphic Novel & Comics	Alice Oseman	Heartstopper, Volume Three
2020	Historical Fiction	Brit Bennett	The Vanishing Half
2020	History & Biography	Isabel Wilkerson	Caste: The Origins of Our Discontents
2020	Horror	Silvia Moreno-Garcia	Mexican Gothic
2020	Humor	Nathan W. Pyle	Strange Planet
2020	Memoir & Autobiography	Barack Obama	A Promised Land
2020	Mystery & Thriller	Lucy Foley	The Guest List
2020	Nonfiction	Jason Reynolds and Ibram X. Kendi	Stamped: Racism, Antiracism, & You
2020	Poetry	Margaret Atwood	Dearly: New Poems
2020	Romance	Jennifer L. Armentrout	From Blood & Ash
2020	Science Fiction	Christopher Paolini	To Sleep in a Sea of Stars
2020	Young Adult Fantasy & Science Fiction	Holly Black	The Queen of Nothing
2020	Young Adult Fiction	Elizabeth Acevedo	Clap When You Land
2020	Food & Cooking	Ina Garten	Modern Comfort Food: A Barefoot Contessa CookbookI
2020	Picture Book	Ibram X. Kendi and Ashley Lukashevsky	Antiracist Baby
2020	Science & Technology	David Attenborough and Jonnie Hughes	A Life on Our Planet: My Witness Statement and a Vision for the Future
2021	Children's & Middle Grade	Rick Riordan	Daughter of the Deep
2021	Debut Novel	Elena Armas	The Spanish Love Deception
2021	Fantasy	Sarah J. Maas	A Court of Silver Flames
2021	Fiction	Sally Rooney	Beautiful World, Where Are You
2021	Graphic Novel & Comics	Rachel Smythe	Lore Olympus
2021	Historical Fiction	Taylor Jenkins Reid	Malibu Rising
2021	History & Biography	Patrick Radden Keefe	Empire of Pain: The Secret History of the Sackler Dynasty
2021	Horror	Grady Hendrix	The Final Girl Support Group
2021	Humor	Jenny Lawson	Broken (in the Best Possible Way)
2021	Memoir & Autobiography	Michelle Zauner	Crying in H Mart
2021	Mystery & Thriller	Laura Dave	The Last Thing He Told Me
2021	Nonfiction	John Green	The Anthropocene Reviewed: Essays on a Human-Centered Planet
2021	Poetry	Amanda Gorman	The Hill We Climb
2021	Romance	Emily Henry	People We Meet on Vacation
2021	Science Fiction	Andy Weir	Project Hail Mary
2021	Young Adult Fantasy & Science Fiction	Leigh Bardugo	Rule of Wolves
2021	Young Adult Fiction	Angeline Boulley	Firekeeper's Daughter
2022	Children's & Middle Grade	Andie Powers	I Am Quiet
2022	Debut Novel	Bonnie Garmus	Lessons in Chemistry
2022	Fantasy	Sarah J. Maas	House of Sky and Breath
2022	Fiction	Gabrielle Zevin	Tomorrow, and Tomorrow, and Tomorrow
2022	Graphic Novel & Comics	Alice Oseman	Heartstopper, Volume Four
2022	Historical Fiction	Taylor Jenkins Reid	Carrie Soto Is Back
2022	History & Biography	Huw Lemmey and Ben Miller (historian)	Bad Gays: A Homosexual History
2022	Horror	Jason Rekulak	Hidden Pictures
2022	Humor	Jenna Fischer and Angela Kinsey	The Office BFFs
2022	Memoir & Autobiography	Jennette McCurdy	I'm Glad My Mom Died
2022	Mystery & Thriller	Nita Prose	The Maid
2022	Nonfiction	Brené Brown	Atlas of the Heart
2022	Poetry	Amanda Gorman	Call Us What We Carry
2022	Romance	Emily Henry	Book Lovers
2022	Science Fiction	Emily St. John Mandel	Sea of Tranquility
2022	Young Adult Fantasy & Science Fiction	V. E. Schwab	Gallant
2022	Young Adult Fiction	Jennifer Lynn Barnes	The Final Gambit
2023	Debut Novel	Emilia Hart	Weyward
2023	Fantasy	Leigh Bardugo	Hell Bent
2023	Fiction	R. F. Kuang	Yellowface
2023	Historical Fiction	Emilia Hart	Weyward
2023	History & Biography	David Grann	The Wager: A Tale of Shipwreck, Mutiny and Murder
2023	Horror	Stephen King	Holly
2023	Humor	Henry Winkler	Being Henry: The Fonz . . . and Beyond
2023	Memoir & Autobiography	Britney Spears	The Woman in Me
2023	Mystery & Thriller	Freida McFadden	The Housemaid's Secret
2023	Nonfiction	Matthew Desmond	Poverty, by America
2023	Romance	Emily Henry	Happy Place
2023	Romantasy	Rebecca Yarros	Fourth Wing
2023	Science Fiction	TJ Klune	In the Lives of Puppets
2023	Young Adult Fantasy	Rebecca Ross	Divine Rivals
2023	Young Adult Fiction	Ali Hazelwood	Check & Mate
2024	Audiobook	Emily Henry (author) and Julia Whelan (narrator)	Funny Story
2024	Debut Novel	Yulin Kuang	How to End a Love Story
2024	Fantasy	T.J. Klune	Somewhere Beyond the Sea
2024	Fiction	Alison Espach	The Wedding People
2024	Historical Fiction	Kristin Hannah	The Women
2024	History & Biography	Evan Friss	The Bookshop: A History of the American Bookstore
2024	Horror	Stephen King	You Like It Darker
2024	Memoir	Kelly Bishop	The Third Gilmore Girl: A Memoir
2024	Mystery & Thriller	Liz Moore	The God of the Woods
2024	Nonfiction	Jonathan Haidt	The Anxious Generation: How the Great Rewiring of Childhood Caused an Epidemic of Mental Illness
2024	Romance	Emily Henry	Funny Story
2024	Romantasy	Sarah J. Maas	House of Flame and Shadow
2024	Science Fiction	Kaliane Bradley	The Ministry of Time
2024	Young Adult Fantasy	Rebecca Ross	Ruthless Vows
2024	Young Adult Fiction	Alice Oseman	Heartstopper, Volume Five
2025	Audiobook	Rebecca Yarros (author) and Rebecca Soler (narrator) and Teddy Hamilton (narrator)	Onyx Storm
2025	Debut Novel	SenLinYu	Alchemised
2025	Fantasy	V. E. Schwab	Bury Our Bones in the Midnight Soil
2025	Fiction	Fredrik Backman	My Friends
2025	Historical Fiction	Taylor Jenkins Reid	Atmosphere (novel)
2025	History & Biography	Zoe Venditozzi and Claire Mitchell	How to Kill a Witch
2025	Horror	Grady Hendrix	Witchcraft for Wayward Girls
2025	Memoir	Shari Franke	The House of My Mother
2025	Mystery & Thriller	Holly Jackson	Not Quite Dead Yet
2025	Nonfiction	John Green	Everything Is Tuberculosis
2025	Romance	Emily Henry	Great Big Beautiful Life
2025	Romantasy	Rebecca Yarros	Onyx Storm
2025	Science Fiction	Aisling Rawle	The Compound
2025	Young Adult Fantasy & Sci-Fi	Suzanne Collins	Sunrise on the Reaping
2025	Young Adult Fiction	Lynn Painter	Fake Skating

== Multiple wins ==
Several authors have won multiple Goodreads Readers Choice Awards or the same award in multiple years. Stephen King and both his sons, Owen and Joe, have won The Goodreads Choice Awards. The table below sets out those authors to have won more than one award:

(Listed by number of wins, then alphabetically by surname)

Number of wins	Author	Winning categories
11	Rick Riordan	Best Children's & Middle Grade (2011, 2012, 2013, 2014, 2015, 2016, 2017, 2018, 2019, 2020, 2021)
10	Stephen King	Best Science Fiction (2011), Best Fantasy (2012), Best Horror (2013, 2017, 2018, 2019, 2023), Best Mystery & Thriller (2014, 2016, 2018)
7	Sarah J. Maas	Best Young Adult Fantasy & Science Fiction (2015, 2016, 2017, 2018), Best Fantasy (2020, 2021, 2022)
5	Veronica Roth	Best Book (2011), Best Young Adult Fantasy & Science Fiction (2011, 2012, 2013), Best Goodreads Author (2012)
5	Suzanne Collins	Best Book (2009, 2010), Best Young Adult Series (2009), Best Young Adult Fantasy (2011), Best Young Adult Fantasy & Sci-Fi (2025)
4	Neil Gaiman	Best Fantasy (2013, 2015), Best Graphic Novel (2009), Best Picture Book (2009)
4	Emily Henry	Best Romance (2021, 2022, 2023, 2025)
4	Taylor Jenkins Reid	Best Historical Fiction (2019, 2021, 2022, 2025)
3	Sarah Andersen	Best Graphic Novel and Comics (2016, 2017, 2018)
3	Margaret Atwood	Best Science Fiction (2013), Best Fiction (2019), Best Poetry (2020)
3	Pierce Brown	Best Goodreads Debut Author (2014), Best Science Fiction (2015, 2016)
3	Ree Drummond	Best Food & Cooking (2012, 2015, 2017)
3	Colleen Hoover	Best Romance (2015, 2016, 2017)
3	Rainbow Rowell	Best Fiction (2014), Best Young Adult Fiction (2013), Best Graphic Novels & Comics (2019)
3	J. K. Rowling	Best Fiction (2012), Best Fantasy (2016, 2017)
3	Angie Thomas	Best Goodreads Debut Author (2017), Best Young Adult Fiction (2017), Best of the Best (2018)
3	J. R. Ward	Best Romance (2010, 2011, 2013)
3	Andy Weir	Best Science Fiction (2014, 2017, 2021)
3	John Green	Best Young Adult Fiction (2012), Best Nonfiction (2021, 2025)
3	V. E. Schwab	Best Science Fiction (2018), Best Young Adult Fantasy & Science Fiction (2022)
3	Leigh Bardugo	Best Fantasy (2019, 2023), Best Young Adult Fantasy (2021)
2	Holly Black	Best Young Adult Fantasy & Science Fiction (2019, 2020)
2	Cassandra Clare	Best Goodreads Author (2011), Best Young Adult Fantasy & Science Fiction (2014)
2	Drew Daywalt and Oliver Jeffers	Best Picture Book (2013, 2015)
2	Diana Gabaldon	Best Romance (2009, 2014)
2	Ina Garten	Best Food & Cooking (2014, 2020)
2	Kristin Hannah	Best Historical Fiction (2015, 2018)
2	Deborah Harkness	Best Paranormal Fantasy (2012), Best Fantasy (2014)
2	Charlaine Harris	Best Fantasy (2009), Best Paranormal Fantasy (2010)
2	Paula Hawkins	Best Mystery & Thriller (2015, 2017)
2	Grady Hendrix	Best Horror (2021, 2025)
2	Jeff Kinney	Best Children's & Middle Grade (2009, 2010)
2	Stieg Larsson	Best Mystery & Thriller (2009, 2010)
2	Jenny Lawson	Best Humor (2012, 2021)
2	Amanda Lovelace	Best Poetry (2016, 2018)
2	Casey McQuiston	Best Romance (2019), Best Debut Novel (2019)
2	Rebecca Skloot	Best Nonfiction (2010), Best Debut Author (2010)
2	Chrissy Teigen & Adeena Sussman	Best Food & Cooking (2016, 2018)
2	Mo Willems	Best Picture Book (2014, 2016)
2	Amanda Gorman	Best Poetry (2021, 2022)
2	Rebecca Yarros	Best Romantasy (2023, 2025)
2	Alice Oseman	Best Graphic Novels & Comics (2020, 2022)
2	Emilia Hart	Best Historical Fiction (2023), Best Debut Novel (2023)
