= Margaret Barclay =

Accused witch of Scotland

- Died: 2 June 1618; Irvine, Ayrshire
- Known for: accused witch

Margaret Barclay (died 1618), was an accused witch put on trial in 1618, 'gently' tortured, confessed and was strangled and burned at the stake in Irvine, Scotland. Her case was written about with horror (Letters on Demonology and Witchcraft, 1830) by the romantic novelist Sir Walter Scott, and in the 21st century, a campaign for a memorial in the town and for a pardon for Barclay and other accused witches was raised in the Scottish Parliament.

== Family life ==
Margaret Barclay was married to Alexander Dein, a burgess and merchant in the town or Irvine, Ayrshire. She was known to have a 'fiery temper' and poor relationships with her husband's family. She had a daughter, Isobel Insch, and said to have had a servant.

== Trial for witchcraft ==
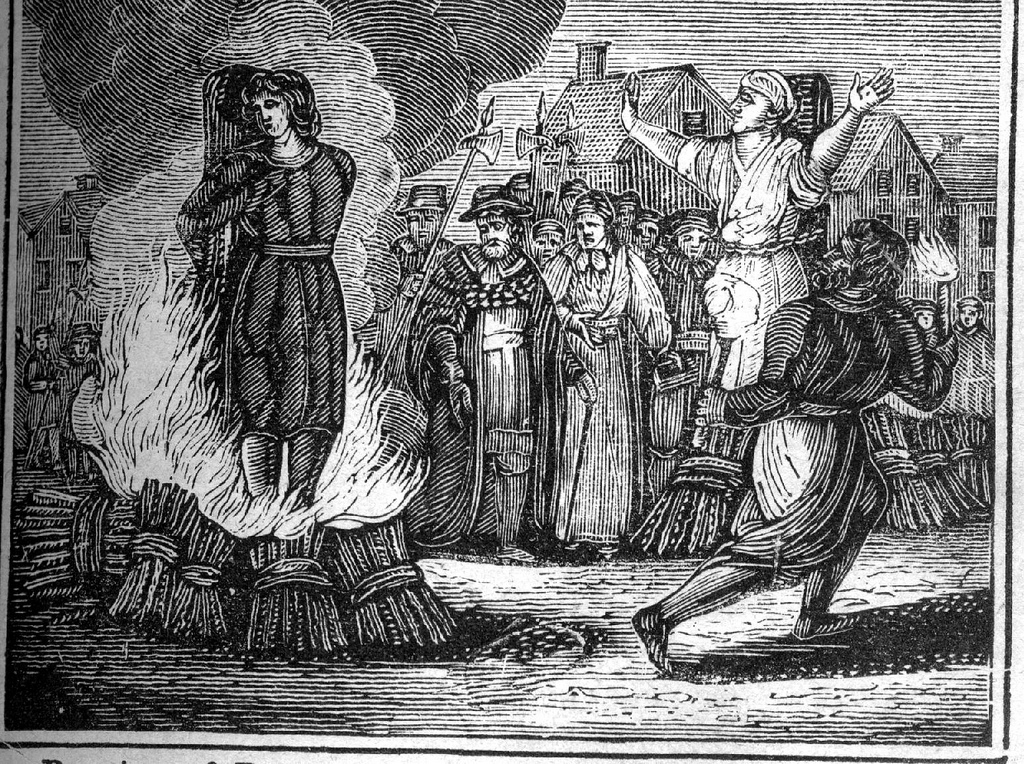
Witch burning etching

Margaret Barclay was accused of being the leader of a witches' coven by her sister-in-law and others, involved in cursing the Irvine ship The Gift of God and causing it to sink near Cornwall, killing all on board, including the owner and skipper, her brother-in-law John Dein and the town Provost Andrew Tran.

Others accused in this trial on 2 June 1618, Isobel Inch her daughter, and John Stewart were tortured and they accused Barclay of cursing the ship and devil worship. However, before the trial they had both died, possibly at their own hand, e.g. Isobel Inch fell from the prison belfry and John Stewart committed suicide by hanging, but another co-accused, Isobel Crawford, received the same treatment and execution as Barclay. John Stewart was an intinerant juggler and had stated under torture that he had heard Barclay curse the ship and make clay effigies of Tran and others and place them in the sea, and Isobel Insch concurred after torture and referred to a 'black dog' as the devil. One piece of evidence of witchcraft against Barclay was that she 'carried a piece of rowan tree and coloured thread' to make her cow produce milk.

Barclay was subjected to what was called a 'gentle' or 'tender' torture to elicit confessions, namely increasing weights placed on her outstretched legs held in iron stocks. Once the pain became unbearable, she confessed: the weights had reached thirty stone (190 kg, or 420 lbs). She was taken to trial, where she then proceeded to deny her guilt, saying “All I have confessed was in agony of torture, and before God, all I have spoken is false and untrue.” She was strangled and burned at the stake as her punishment.

== Reaction over centuries ==
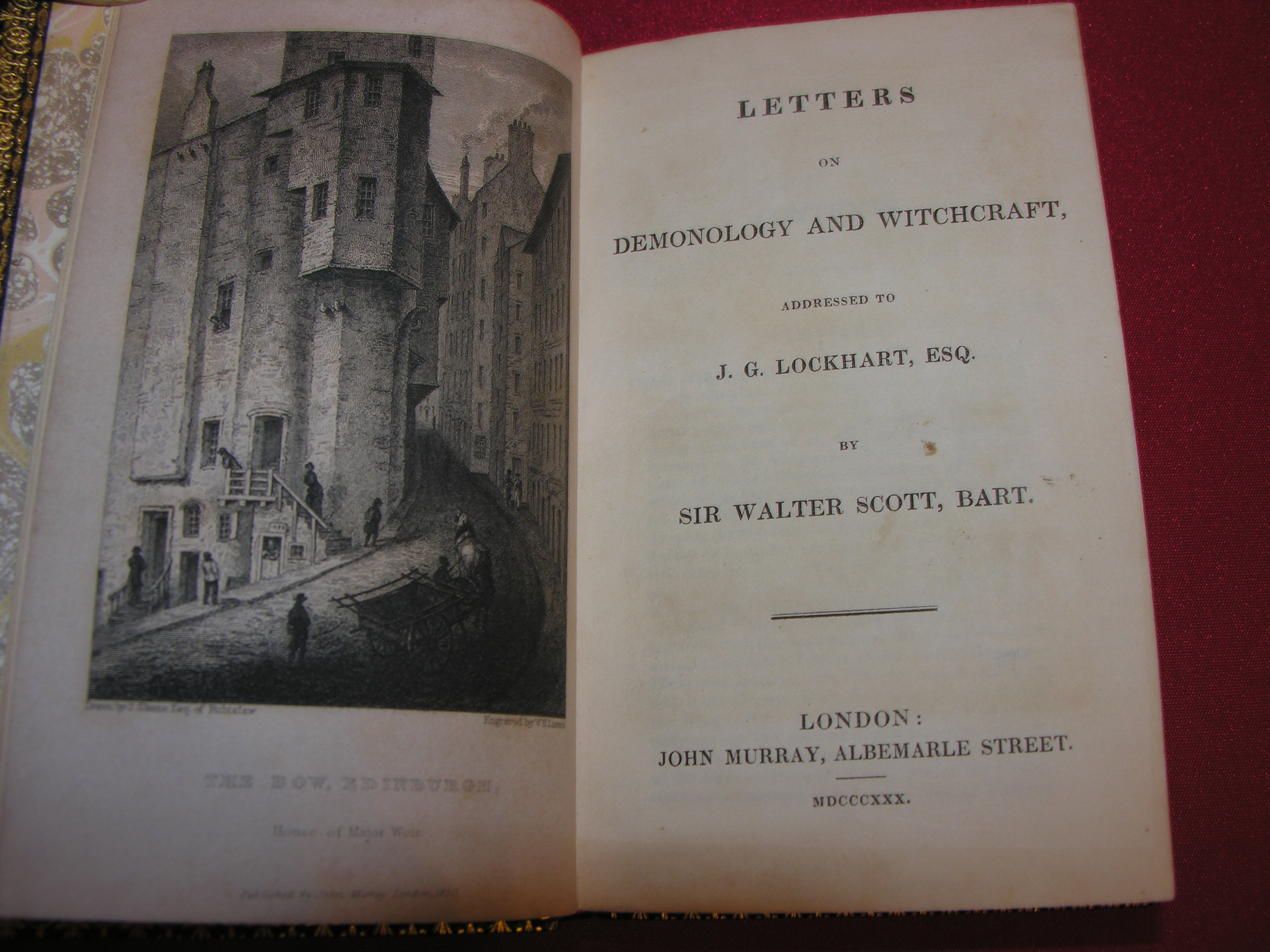
Letters on Demonology and Witchcraft

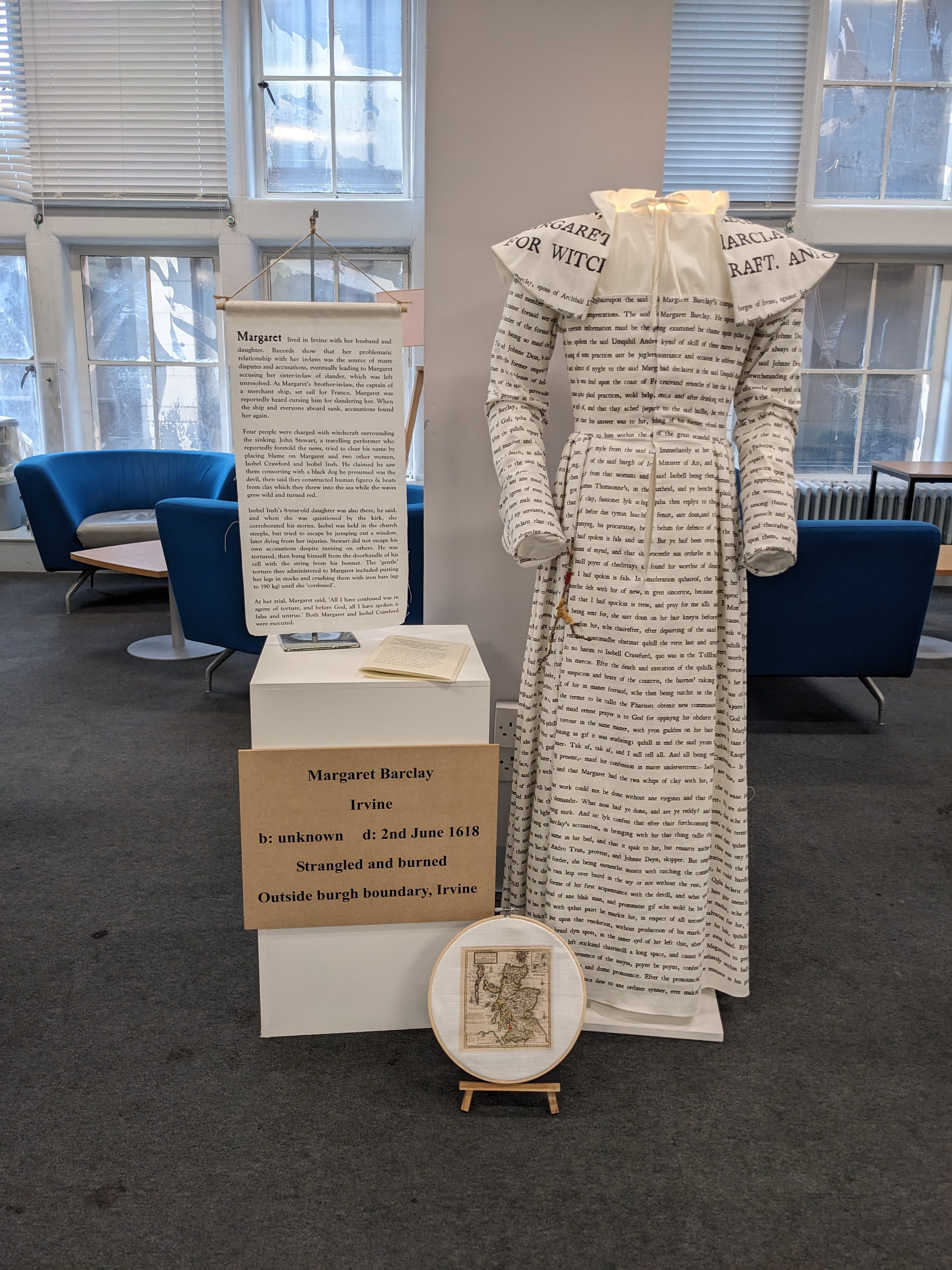
Display of Margaret Barclay in Witches in Word, Not Deed by Carolyn Sutton at Edinburgh Central Library 2023

Barclay's case highlighted cruelty and unreliability of evidence under torture, and her case was still referred to centuries later. After describing the trial and so-called evidence in detail in 1830, Sir Walter Scott wrote

"It is scarce possible that, after reading such a story, a man of sense can listen for an instant to the evidence founded on confessions thus obtained, which has been almost the sole reason by which a few individuals, even in modern times, have endeavoured to justify a belief in the existence of witchcraft.”

Barclay's case was described in modern times as 'merciless justice' in an article about persecuted Scots emigrating to Northern Ireland in the 17th century, as Barclay could not escape her accusers. A local historian started a campaign, four centuries later, for a memorial to her to be placed in the town. The Ayrshire MSP, Ruth Maguire raised a 2018 motion in the Scottish Parliament for memorials to be raised to Barclay and to the thousands of others who were tortured and killed in the Scottish Witch Trials.

In 2021, a wider petition was raised up to right a 'miscarriage of justice' and pardon the accused witches, like Barclay, in Scotland, and their case is being pursued by Claire Mitchell, QC.

In 2023, Barclay was one of thirteen accused witches included in a display Witches in Word, Not Deed by Carolyn Sutton, exhibited in the Edinburgh Central Library.
