= Beach Read (film) =

- Directed by: Yulin Kuang
- Screenplay by: Yulin Kuang
- Based on: Beach Read by Emily Henry
- Produced by: Karina Rahardja; Neal H. Moritz
- Starring: Phoebe Dynevor; Patrick Schwarzenegger; Kristin Davis; Tig Notaro; Ella Balinska; Andie MacDowell; Kevin Bacon
- Cinematography: Steve Yedlin
- Production company: Original Film
- Distributed by: 20th Century Studios
- Release date: May 7, 2027
- Country: United States
- Language: English

Beach Read is an upcoming American romantic comedy film written and directed by Yulin Kuang, based on the 2020 novel by Emily Henry. It stars Phoebe Dynevor, Patrick Schwarzenegger, Kristin Davis, Tig Notaro, Ella Balinska, Andie MacDowell, and Kevin Bacon.

Beach Read is scheduled to be released in the United States on May 7, 2027, by 20th Century Studios.

== Cast ==
- Phoebe Dynevor as January Andrews
- Patrick Schwarzenegger as Augustus "Gus" Everett
- Andie MacDowell
- Kevin Bacon
- Kristin Davis
- Tig Notaro
- Inanna Sarkis
- Ella Balinska

== Production ==
In April 2023, it was announced that Emily Henry's novel Beach Read was being adapted into a feature film for 20th Century Studios, with Yulin Kuang set to direct. In February 2026, Phoebe Dynevor joined the cast. In April 2026, Patrick Schwarzenegger joined the cast. Andie MacDowell and Kevin Bacon would be added to the cast in May. In June, Kristin Davis, Tig Notaro, Inanna Sarkis, and Ella Balinska joined the cast.

Filming began in Toronto in June 2026, Kuang revealing this on Instagram. Steve Yedlin serves as cinematographer.

== Release ==
Beach Read is scheduled to be released in the United States on May 7, 2027.
