= People We Meet on Vacation (film) =

2026 film by Brett Haley

- Release poster
- Directed by: Brett Haley
- Screenplay by: Yulin Kuang; Amos Vernon; Nunzio Randazzo
- Based on: People We Meet on Vacation by Emily Henry
- Produced by: Wyck Godfrey; Marty Bowen; Isaac Klausner
- Starring: Emily Bader; Tom Blyth
- Cinematography: Rob C. Givens
- Edited by: Evan Henke
- Music by: Keegan DeWitt
- Production companies: 3000 Pictures; HarperCollins Publishers; Temple Hill Entertainment
- Distributed by: Netflix
- Release date: January 9, 2026
- Running time: 118 minutes
- Country: United States
- Language: English
- Budget: $14.3 million

People We Meet on Vacation is a 2026 American romantic comedy film directed by Brett Haley from a screenplay by Yulin Kuang, Amos Vernon, and Nunzio Randazzo, based on the 2021 novel by Emily Henry. It stars Emily Bader and Tom Blyth.

Polar opposites, Poppy wants to explore the world while Alex would prefer to stay home with a good book, but surprisingly they become best friends after sharing a car to their small Ohio hometown from Boston. They live far apart, but for a decade they have shared one week of summer vacation together, which finally leads to a deeper connection.

The film was released on Netflix on January 9, 2026. It received generally positive reception.

== Plot ==
Poppy is a New York City-based travel writer, though she has grown unhappy with her life. When her friend David reminds her of his upcoming wedding in Barcelona, Poppy realizes it is an opportunity to reconnect with David's brother, her former best friend Alex, with whom she has not spoken in two years. She calls Alex, falsely telling him that she is going to Barcelona for work and will be attending the wedding.

Poppy and Alex's history is revealed in a series of flashbacks. They met nine years prior at Boston College, becoming friends over a prolonged road trip back to their shared hometown of Linfield, Ohio. They are forced to share a motel room, though Alex is careful to consider his girlfriend, Sarah.

The following year, Poppy takes Alex camping in Squamish, following his breakup with Sarah. They are invited to join a group of partying campers. However, rather than have casual sex with other people, the two return to their tent and commit to annual summer vacations together.

In the present, Poppy and Alex awkwardly reunite. The two recall a trip to New Orleans six years prior, during which they pretended to be on their honeymoon, despite Alex having reconciled with Sarah and Poppy dating a man that Alex disliked. While attempting to fix the air con unit in Poppy's hotel room, Alex has a back spasm and is forced to rest. They remember the time they planned to go to Norway four years earlier, but Poppy fell ill, so Alex elected to come to New York to take care of her instead.

Alex invites Poppy to the rehearsal dinner, but learns that she lied about being in Barcelona for work. He questions her motives, Poppy reveals she missed him and Alex admits the same. Poppy says she just wants things to return to how they were before their Tuscany trip, but Alex says he cannot.

Two years earlier, Alex and Poppy met at a Tuscan villa along with their significant others, Sarah and Trey. After Alex discreetly helped a frightened Poppy with a pregnancy test, they nearly kissed; she claimed that she did not mean it and Alex stormed off. The following morning, Alex proposed to Sarah, who accepted. Alex told Poppy that he and Sarah plan to settle down in Linfield together, though Poppy objected, believing it is not what he truly wanted. Offended, Alex declared that this is their last trip together.

In the present, Poppy presses Alex on his breakup with Sarah, and he finally admits it was because of Poppy. They declare their love for one another, have sex, and attend the wedding together. At the reception, Alex asks about their future together, and is offended when Poppy says she wants time to figure things out. He accuses her of not knowing what she wants and running away from her problems through vacations, while she disparages his insistence on staying in Linfield.

At the airport, Poppy runs into Sarah, who has become a flight attendant. Poppy apologizes, but Sarah assures her the breakup was not just because of Alex and Poppy's intimate friendship, as she did not know what she wanted out of life. Poppy resigns from her job and travels to Linfield. Confronting Alex, she admits her fear of being "too much" for her and reaffirms her desire to be with him.

By the next summer, Alex and Poppy are living together in New York City and have settled into their life together, including vacationing as a couple.

== Cast ==
- Emily Bader as Poppy
- Tom Blyth as Alex
- Sarah Catherine Hook as Sarah
- Lucien Laviscount as Trey
- Miles Heizer as David
- Jameela Jamil as Swapna
- Tommy Do as Nam
- Lukas Gage as Buck
- Alice Lee as Rachel
- Molly Shannon as Wanda
- Alan Ruck as Jimmy
- Spencer Neville as Julian
- Ian Porter as Ed Nilsen
- Madeleine Akua as Daisy
- Bethany Anne Lind as Stacey
- Michael A. Newcomer as Bob
- Layton Williams as Wedding Officiant

== Production ==
The film was produced by Wyck Godfrey, Marty Bowen, and Isaac Klausner for Temple Hill. In addition, it was produced under Sony Pictures first look deal with Netflix. Brett Haley directed with Yulin Kuang, Amos Vernon, and Nunzio Randazzo adapting the screenplay. In July 2024, Emily Bader and Tom Blyth joined the lead cast. Sarah Catherine Hook, Jameela Jamil, Lucien Laviscount, and Lukas Gage joined in September 2024. Additional casting included the addition of Alan Ruck and Molly Shannon. Principal photography began that month.

== Release ==
People We Meet on Vacation was released on Netflix on January 9, 2026.

== Reception ==
On the review aggregator website Rotten Tomatoes, 78% of 67 critics' reviews are positive, with an average rating of 6.3/10. The website's consensus reads: "People We Meet on Vacation is a breezy adaptation that boasts charming leads in Tom Blyth and Emily Bader, delivering a romantic endeavor worth staying for." Metacritic, which uses a weighted average, assigned the film a score of 50 out of 100, based on 14 critics, indicating "mixed or average" reviews. The film premiered to 17.2 million viewers over its debut weekend.

=== Accolades ===
Year	Award	Category	Recipient(s)	Result	Ref.
2026	Gotham TV Awards	Outstanding Original Film, Broadcast or Streaming	People We Meet on Vacation (Note: Nominees: Brett Haley, Wyck Godfrey, Marty Bowen, and Isaac Klausner)	Nominated	
2026	Primetime Creative Arts Emmy Awards	Outstanding Movie	People We Meet on Vacation (Note: Nominees: Laura Quicksilver, Ted Gidlow, Emily Henry, Wyck Godfrey, Marty Bowen, and Isaac Klausner)	Nominated	
