= Happy Place (novel) =

Novel by Emily Henry

- Author: Emily Henry
- Audio read by: Julia Whelan
- Language: English
- Genre: Romance, literary fiction
- Publisher: Berkley Books
- Publication date: April 25, 2023
- Publication place: United States
- Media type: Print (hardcover, paperback), ebook, audiobook
- Pages: 400 pp
- ISBN: 9780593441275 (hardcover 1st ed.)
- OCLC: 1338833080
- Dewey Decimal: 813/.6
- LC Class: PS3608.E5715 H36 2023

Happy Place is a novel written by American author Emily Henry and published by Berkley Books on April 25, 2023. It follows a couple as they work through the complexities of a relationship and breakup, discovering along the way what finding one's "happy place" really means. It was well-received by critics and audiences alike, receiving positive reviews from Kirkus and The Washington Post and winning the Goodreads Choice Award for Romance Novel.

== Synopsis ==
Happy Place revolves around the lives of Harriet Kilpatrick and Wyn Connor, who have been in a committed relationship for eight years. They have separated, but chose to keep it a secret from their friends. Every year, they go on a retreat to a beautiful cottage in Maine, which they call their "happy place." During their stay, they try to pretend that they are still very much together and in love, but it becomes increasingly difficult to keep up the act. The book explores love, loss, and the complexities of relationships.

Harriet is a young surgical resident who is exhausted and unsure about her future in medicine. Meanwhile, Wyn is facing personal struggles and navigating significant career changes. The story examines their bond and the challenges they face as they try to navigate their complex feelings and the dynamics of their friend group. The narrative moves back and forth in time, showing how their relationship began in college and evolved over time, with various ups and downs, including distance, misunderstandings, and personal growth.

Harriet and Wyn meet again to revisit their past misunderstandings. They also discover new things about themselves and what they truly desire in life. Through this journey, Harriet realizes that being a surgeon is not her true calling and instead, she has a newfound passion for pottery. Wyn finds his passion for woodworking and a new path in Montana. The story focuses on personal growth and how it is possible to find happiness and fulfillment not only in physical places but also in the choices we make and the relationships we have.

Throughout their journey, Harriet and Wyn experience moments of conflict, forgiveness, and introspection, reflecting on what it takes to find happiness and love in life. The story concludes with a sense of resolution and new beginnings as they choose to face their future together, placing importance on their personal growth and the strength of their relationship.

== Characters ==
- Harriet Kilpatrick, known to her friends as Harry, is the 30-year-old narrator and protagonist of the novel. She is a well-developed and relatable character who is struggling to come to terms with her recent separation with her ex-fiancé Wyn. She grew up in Indianapolis as the youngest of two daughters. Her sister's rebellious nature caused tension in her family, forcing Harriet to take on the role of the peacekeeper. Harriet believes that she must be perfect and accomplished in order to keep her family together. This leads her down the path of becoming a surgeon, where she is currently struggling through her residency in San Francisco. Harriet's upbringing results in her tendency to avoid conflict and remain emotionally closed off. Throughout the story, Harriet shows significant growth; becoming more open, vulnerable and decisive. She eventually opens up about her dissatisfaction with her career and her ongoing fear of losing her friends and family.
- Wyndham Connor, who goes by Wyn, is Harriet's 31-year-old ex-fiancé. He grew up playing soccer in Montana, the place he still loyally calls home. He is portrayed as a sweet, charismatic man with an interest in the outdoors and carpentry. Although he was raised by a loving family, Wyn struggles with his worth, often comparing himself to his accomplished sisters. These self-deprecating tendencies lead him to avoid conflict and suppress his emotions, a trend that only becomes more prominent as the book progresses.
- Sabrina Armas, one of Harriet's best friends, is the owner of the cottage that the group refers to as their "happy place.” She is the leader and organizer of the group because of her dynamic type-A personality. Her character is kind and caring, allowing her deeply rooted value of friendship to shine through. Sabrina is always the one to keep in touch with her friends and make plans because she fears growing apart and change.
- Cleo James is Harriet's other closest friend, defined by her artistic, wise and ecologically-minded personality. She creates depth in the group dynamic because unlike the others, she is not afraid of conflict or setting boundaries. Cleo struggles with her identity and sense of self, worried she is too stern and not fun to be around.
- Kimberly Carmichael, who goes by Kim, is Cleo's girlfriend. Her personality is very different from that of her partner, marked by her fun, lighthearted demeanor.
- Parth Nayak is Sabrina's fiancé and the final member of the friend group.

== Critical reception ==
Happy Place has been widely well received. Kirkus Reviews called it a "wistfully nostalgic, look at endings, beginnings, and loving the people who will always have your back." The Washington Post also recommended it to readers for its "heart-rending plot that struggles to express the inexpressible." The Harvard Crimson called it "sexy, charming, and meaningful".

== Awards ==
Happy Place was named Best Romance Novel at the 2023 Goodreads Choice Awards, marking the third consecutive year that one of Emily Henry's books won that award category (following People We Meet on Vacation and Book Lovers). In May 2023, Happy Place gained recognition from The New York Times and was recognized as one of the number one books of the year.
