= Forged by Blood =

2023 novel by Ehigbor Okosun

- The cover at for Forged by Blood
- Author: Ehigbor Okosun
- Language: English
- Series: The Tinted Blood
- Genre: Fantasy
- Set in: Nigeria
- Publisher: Harper Voyage
- Publication date: 8 August 2023
- Publication place: Nigeria
- Media type: Print (hardback, paperback), eBook
- Pages: 400
- ISBN: 978-0-06-311262-9

Forged by Blood is a 2023 young adult fantasy novel by Nigerian novelist Ehigbor Okosun and published by Harper Voyage in 2023. The novel, Okosun's debut novel and the first book in a planned duology, follows Dèmi who kidnaps the crown prince of Ife kingdom in order to get a negotiation to free her fellow Oluso from oppression.

== Plot ==
Born in a time of tyrannical regime of a king who hates magic and those who perform magic, Dèmi and her mother (who are Oluso) disguise as Ajes while helping people secretly. Dèmi's mother is killed after healing the son of an Aje woman, who reports them because she is afraid of the magic of Olusos. Dèmi who is now an orphan is fueled to get revenge and goes into hiding but is recruited by Lord Ekwenski nine years later to help kidnap the crown prince in order to make a bargain with the king—to get Lord Ekwenski into the council and also stop the slavery of the Oluso.

== Characters ==
- Dèmi — the main character
- Jonas — the crown prince
- Colin — Dèmi's best friend
- Lord Ekwenski — a politician who wants to join the king's council
- Edingard — the king

== Background and publication history ==
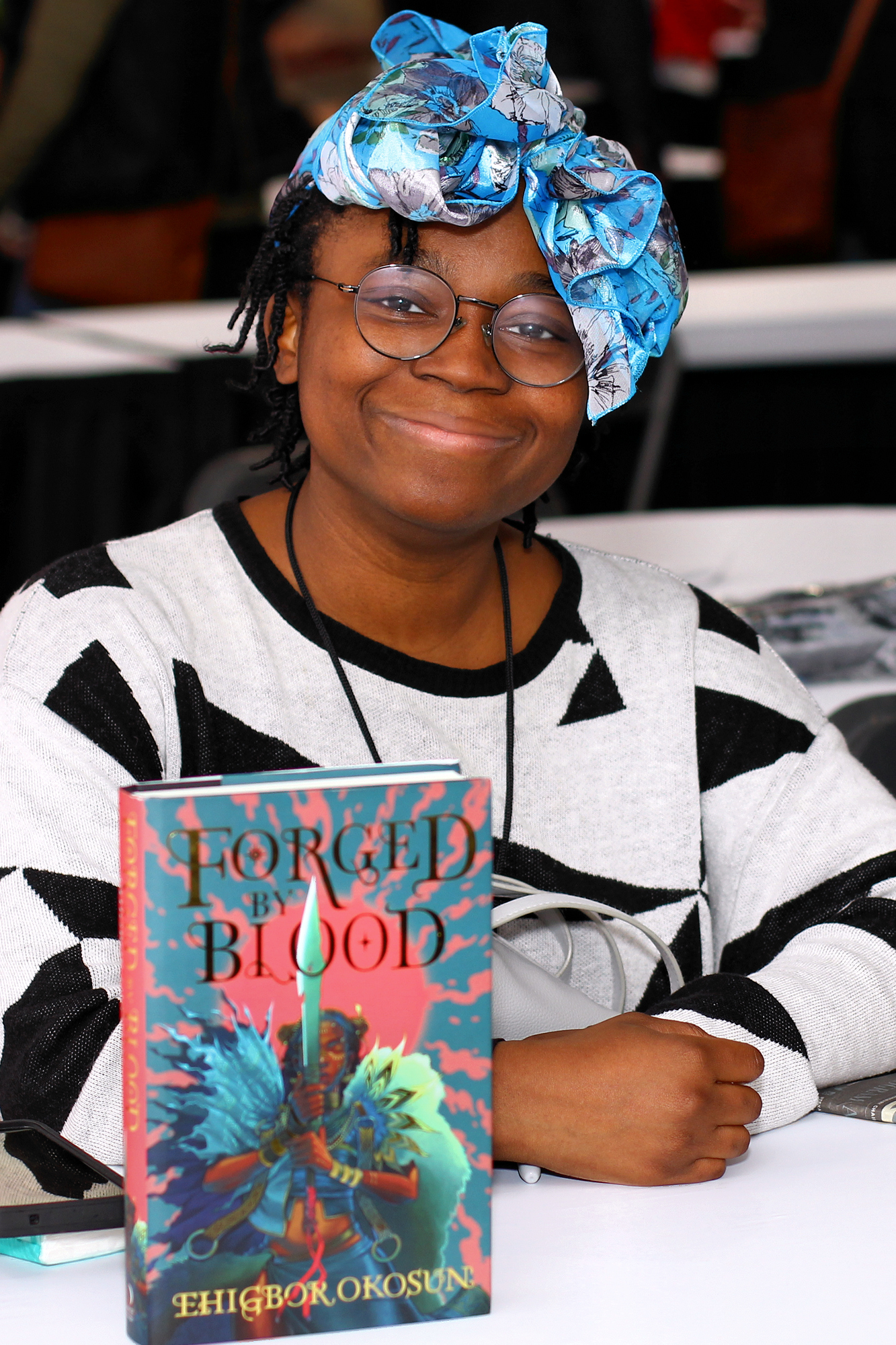
Okosun at the 2023 Texas Book Festival

Okosun wrote the manuscript of the novel after taking a short break from school as a means of distraction. She wrote the first draft in 2016 and "refined" it in 2019 before selling the book to Harper Voyage in 2020.

Okosun drew inspiration from the Nigerian mythology (particularly the Yoruba mythology) for the settings of her novel.

Forged by Blood was published on 8 August 2023 by Harper Voyage, with political struggle, race, class and oppression being its major theme.

== Reception ==
Forged by Blood was critically acclaimed. It earned a starred reviews from Publishers Weekly and Booklist. The former praised "Okosun's elaborate worldbuilding is lavishly detailed and meticulously constructed," noting "[t]he result is an impressive and refreshingly original page-turner that will leave readers eagerly awaiting the second volume". Emily Whitmore reviewing at Booklist praised the "world building and political complications" that readers would enjoy. Leigh Verburg writing for Library Journal praised the "fast-paced adventure that fans of Rebecca Ross and Tomi Adeyemi would enjoy."
