= Happy Place =

Happy Place may refer to:

- Happy Place (film), 2020
- Happy Place, a 2017 single by Alison Wonderland
- "Happy Place" (Terror Jr song), 2019
- Happy Place, a 2020 EP by Juls
- Happy Place, a 2021 single and 2022 EP by Saint Phnx
- Happy Place, a 2019 play by Adam Cayton-Holland
- Happy Place, a podcast by Fearne Cotton
- Happy Place (novel), 2023 novel

== See also ==
- The Happy Place, an episode of CSI: Crime Scene Investigation season 9
- A Happy Place, a 2010 single by Katie Melua
- A Happy Place, a film production company co-founded by Lance Bass
- My Happy Place, a 2019 album by Emma Bunton
- My Happy Place, a 2004 song by Odds, the ending theme of television series Corner Gas
- Happy Place, the theme song from The Jennifer Hudson Show.
