= Book Lovers =

2022 romance novel by Emily Henry

- Author: Emily Henry
- Genre: Romance novel
- Publisher: Berkley Books
- Publication date: May 3, 2022
- Awards: Goodreads Choice Award for Romance (2022)
- ISBN: 9780593334836

Book Lovers is a 2022 romance novel by Emily Henry.

On March 28, 2023, Tango Entertainment bought the rights to create a film adaptation, with Sarah Heyward attached to write the script.

== Plot ==
New York literary agent Nora Stephens is convinced to take a vacation at Sunshine Falls, North Carolina, for the entire month of August by her younger sister, Libby. Nora and Libby were raised by a single mother, who died when Libby was in high school. Throughout her adult life, Nora has given up everything in order to support Libby.

She discovers that Charlie Lastra, a book editor she is not on good terms with, is from Sunshine Falls and also happens to be in town. He's also running the local bookstore, which his parents own, in order to help them out.

While they're there, Nora and Charlie collaborate to edit a book that one of Nora's clients, Dusty Fielding, wrote. Charlie assists Nora to obtain an editorial position—the publishing career that Nora first aspired to—while they collaborate. Charlie and Nora fall in love, but as it turns out, Charlie wants to stay in Sunshine Falls to support his family since his father is not doing well. A long-distance romance seems too difficult for Nora.

In the meantime, Libby tells Nora that she genuinely wants to move to Sunshine Falls, and the original purpose of the trip was to persuade Nora to do the same. However, Libby ends up encouraging Nora to pursue her dreams of being a book editor in New York instead, not wanting Nora to make any more sacrifices for her.

After the trip, Nora goes back to New York. Charlie does, however, disclose a few months later that his father is doing better and that Libby has offered to take over as manager of the bookstore. The novel closes with him getting ready to pop the question to Nora after moving to New York.

== Reception ==
Book Lovers was well received by critics, including starred reviews from Booklist, Kirkus Reviews.

Kirkus called the novel "a heartfelt and hilarious read about books, sisters, and writing your own love story," whereas Publishers Weekly referred to it as "a moving examination of love, belonging, and family."

Shelf Awareness's Kerry McHugh highlighted how "Book Lovers uses classic romance tropes with purpose and intention, offering readers a satisfying romance unto itself, while also reflecting on why romance novels are so enticing to begin with. Henry draws in themes of family and mental health, holding and taking space for self and loved ones, and the power of books to heal, soothe and reveal." McHugh concluded that Book Lovers is "a smart, charming and dazzling book unto itself".

Carole V. Bell, writing for NPR, also commented on the ways the novel both utilizes and subverts class romance tropes: "The story is multilayered and the characters' familial challenges are complex. By both playing to and overtly subverting romance tropes and archetypes like the high-powered big city woman who neglects her family and the life-affirming power of small-town life, this novel delivers an insightful comedic meditation on love, family and going your own way."

Similarly, the Associated Press's Alicia Rancilio noted, "While Book Lovers has that scenario," where a big-city person falls in love in the small town, the book "also deconstructs it."

On behalf of Paste, Natalie Zutter discussed how Book Lovers "continues a growing trend in contemporary romance that I hope is here to stay, wherein the love affair isn’t the only heartstring being tugged ... The trickiest part of romance is sticking the landing. If readers expect an HEA [happily ever after] but your whole book is predicated on life not always ending on a happy note, how do you reconcile the two? There’s a part of me that wonders, if Book Lovers had been written to lean more into the literary fiction side of things, if it might have turned out differently. That said, Henry pulls off an ending that both fulfills the genre tropes while still surprising this teary-eyed reader."

Multiple reviewers discussed the novel's characters. Booklist's Keira Soleore described Nora as "scary, precise, and organized" and Charlie as having "a reputation for brusqueness, broodiness, and acerbic editorial comments", though "they are both true big-city workaholics who appreciate each other’s ethics and brilliance, but both struggle with insecurities and the sense that they will always be watching life from the outside." Publishers Weekly praised Henry's skill for "creating empathetic characters [that engage] the reader." Kirkus noted that "while the romance between Nora and Charlie is swoonworthy and steam-filled, it’s Nora’s relationship with Libby that really brings the tears."

Reviewers also discussed the book's comedic elements. Alicia Rancilio writing for the Associated Press, called Book Lovers "a romance fueled by quick banter," and remarked, "If Emily Henry makes herself laugh at the character’s dialogue in her own books, it’s understandable. She is a master at witty repartee." Kirkus also called it "hilarious."

The audiobook, narrated by Julia Whelan, also received a starred review from Booklist, whose Candace Smith noted that "Whelan is a pro voicing Charlie’s low, raspy voice and Nora’s sarcasm. Interchanges are brisk, and Whelan makes the whole experience a joyful, sexy romp."

== Awards and honors ==
Book Lovers was an IndieBound bestseller, as well as the second bestselling audiobook on Libro.fm in 2022.

Kirkus Reviews named Book Lovers one of the best romance novels of 2022.

It won the 2022 Goodreads Choice Award for Best Romance, and the Reference and User Services Association included the audiobook on their 2022 Listen List.

== Translations ==
Language	Title	Translator	Year of Publication	Publisher	ISBN
Arabic	عشاق وكتب (Lovers and Books)	Amal N. Halabi (آمال ن. الحلبي)	2024	Dar Altanweer	ISBN 9786144722572

== Film adaptation ==
On March 28, 2023, Tango Entertainment bought the rights to create a film adaptation with Sarah Heyward attached to write the script .
