= Great Big Beautiful Life =

2025 romance novel by Emily Henry

- First edition cover
- Author: Emily Henry
- Language: English
- Genre: Fiction, Romance, Historical fiction
- Publisher: Berkley Books
- Publication date: April 22, 2025
- Publication place: United States
- ISBN: 9780593441299

Great Big Beautiful Life is a 2025 romance/historical fiction novel by American author Emily Henry. Set on the fictional seaside town of Little Crescent in Georgia, it follows journalists Alice Scott and Hayden Anderson, who are competing to become the biographer of former celebrity heiress Margaret Ives.

The novel debuted at number one on The New York Times fiction best-seller list and was the top national fiction bookseller following its release.

== Plot overview ==
Up-and-coming writer Alice Scott arrives on the Georgia town of Little Crescent intending to interview Margaret Ives, an elusive octogenarian heiress who has disappeared from the public eye. She is intimidated by the arrival of Hayden Anderson, an aloof Pulitzer Prize-winning journalist, who is also vying for the chance to publish Margaret's story.

Margaret offers to speak with them individually for a month, after which they will pitch their ideas for her biography and she will select one. In her conversations with Margaret, Alice learns about the sordid history and legacy of the Ives family, details about Margaret's glamorous life and tragic marriage, and other shocking secrets. Meanwhile, Alice and Hayden realize Margaret is not being entirely truthful. Despite their rivalry, they try to piece the truth together without breaking their NDAs, and become more drawn to one another in the process.

== Characters ==
=== Main ===
- Alice Scott: The protagonist and viewpoint character. Alice is an optimistic, bubbly and personable writer of celebrity fluff pieces, who is hoping that writing about Margaret Ives will prove to be her big break.
- Hayden Anderson: A renowned writer whose prior biography won a Pulitzer Prize. Though externally cynical, intimidating and aloof, Hayden eventually reveals vulnerability and depth in his interactions with Alice.
- Margaret Ives: Daughter of Frederick Ives and Doris Bernhardt, and widow of singer Cosmo Sinclair. A former "tabloid princess" who retreated from the public eye and now lives on Crescent Island under an assumed name.

=== Ives family ===
- Lawrence Ives: Margaret's great-grandfather, who left his large family of poor Pennsylvania farmers to seek his fortune out west. After a falling-out with his business partner, Lawrence bought the paper The San Francisco Daily Dispatch and founded the Ives media dynasty. He had two children by heiress Amelia Lowe, Gerald and Gigi.
- Gerald Ives: Lawrence and Amelia's son. Despite constant tension with Lawrence, he successfully broadened the Ives family media holdings on the East Coast. He married Rosalind Goodlett, the daughter of a New York politician.
- Geraldine "Gigi" Ives Lawrence and Amelia's free-spirited daughter and Gerald's sister, who married an Englishman.
- Nina Gill: Gerald's longtime mistress, a silent film actress who was unable to make the transition to talkies.
- Frederick Ives: Gerald and Rosalind's son. Frederick eventually became a player in the burgeoning film industry.
- Ruth Allen: Gigi's daughter and Gerald's beloved niece. She tragically died young in a plane crash along with her husband.
- Bernie Ives (née Doris Bernhardt): Frederick's wife and mother to Margaret and Laura, a pioneering and strong-willed female director.
- Laura Ives: Frederick and Bernie's younger daughter and Margaret's sensitive and delicate younger sister.
- Cosmo Sinclair: A rock star dubbed the "Poor Man's Elvis", who had a whirlwind romance with Margaret. His death in a car crash caused Margaret's reclusiveness.

=== Others ===
- Theo: A man Alice is semi-seriously dating at the beginning.
- Jodi: Margaret's mysterious caretaker.
- Cecil: An easygoing local man who befriends Alice.
- Angela Scott: Alice's mother, a former hippie who lives in Georgia. Alice feels as if she does not truly appreciate Alice's literary output.

== Background ==
The novel's title was first revealed in September 2024. The cover, synopsis, and release date were announced in October 2024.

Henry has stated that the book was inspired by the legacies of famous clans such as the British royal family and the Kennedy family. She has also cited the Taylor Swift song "The Last Great American Dynasty" (which is based on socialite Rebekah Harkness), as well as historical media dynasties like the Hearsts and the Murdochs, as inspiration.

Speaking with USA Today, which noted the book's structure as a mild departure from Henry's other work, Henry expressed the desire to write about a romance that was broader than "two people at the heart of a rom-com" and a testament to previous generations. In an interview with NPR, she says she wanted to write about other types of love besides romantic, hence the novel's focus on familial love (such as the sisterly bond between Margaret and Laura, and the complex relationship between Alice and her mother Angela). In another interview with E!News, Henry stated that the final reveal involving Hayden came about after she had difficulty with the relatively conflict-free romance of her previous novel Funny Story, and that this twist became central to the writing process of Great Big Beautiful Life.

== Reception ==
The novel received mixed-to-positive reviews from critics. Publishers Weekly called the book a "stunner" and praised the descriptions of Margaret's past as candid and poignant. In her review for the Chicago Review of Books, Angie Raney commended Henry's writing prowess and the novel's themes. In a review for The Boston Globe, Leigh Haber noted that the novel was formulaic and replete with familiar tropes, but was nonetheless a "charming love story".

On the other hand, The Miami Student rated the book 5/10, criticizing the pacing and Margaret's story. The Stanford Daily's review considered Margaret's story compelling, but found Alice a lacking protagonist.

Kirkus Reviews described the romance between Alice and Hayden as a "delightful slow burn". Writing for Library Journal, Whitney Kramer praised the love story and compared the format to the novel The Seven Husbands of Evelyn Hugo
