= Funny Story (novel) =

Novel by Emily Henry

- First edition
- Author: Emily Henry
- Language: English
- Genre: Fiction, Romance
- Publisher: Berkley Books
- Publication date: April 23, 2024
- Publication place: United States
- ISBN: 978-0-593-44128-2

Funny Story is a 2024 novel by American author Emily Henry. The romance novel follows librarian Daphne and Miles, whose exes are dating each other. Magazine Paste says it "has lots of heart but too little mischief".

Funny Story debuted at number one on The New York Times fiction best-seller list and USA Today best-selling booklist, and, as of July 2024, has sold over 800,000 copies in North America.

== Plot summary ==
Daphne Vincent is a children's librarian who moved to Michigan to live with her fiancé, Peter. Shortly before their wedding, Peter abruptly breaks up with Daphne to be with his longtime friend, Petra. Daphne moves in with Miles Nowak, Petra's jilted boyfriend. A heartbroken Daphne plans to move away from Michigan after the Read-a-Thon, an all-night fundraiser run by her library, which she is highly passionate about.

Peter and Petra invite Miles and Daphne to their wedding, spurring the two to drink and bond. Daphne RSVPs to the wedding and lies to Peter that she is dating Miles. Miles agrees to the plan. Once he learns of Daphne's tentative plans to move away, he offers to show her around Michigan. Daphne and Miles slowly get to know one another, and despite their differences, they become friends. Daphne befriends her tough co-worker, Ashleigh, and reveals the fake relationship with Miles. Daphne and Miles' mutual attraction grows.

Miles' younger sister Julia visits from Chicago, joining their friend group with Ashleigh. Daphne and Miles continue their weekly trips around Michigan, with Miles eventually taking Daphne to a prom for senior citizens so she can get more volunteers for the Read-a-Thon. During the prom, they run into Peter and Petra and egg them on by kissing and dancing together, but Daphne, realizing her growing feelings towards Miles, spontaneously flees. Miles follows her and the two admit mutual feelings for one another but refrain from taking things further when Miles discloses his tendency to panic when things get complicated. Daphne decides to internally restrain her desire for him.

Daphne's negligent father, Jason, and his new wife, Starfire, visit. Daphne confides in Miles her struggle to accept her father. Jason and Starfire flake on a visit to visit Daphne, with Miles informing Daphne that they decided to spend time with new friends. To lift her spirits, Miles brings her to his favorite beach. The two sleep together and spend the next day together.

The next Monday, Daphne realizes that she forgot to celebrate Ashleigh's birthday with Ashleigh by painting her bedroom together. Ashleigh rebuffs Daphne when the latter tries to apologize. Miles also disappears for a few days.

Daphne unexpectedly gets a call to interview for a job in Maryland, which would let her live close to her mother. Peter tries to get back together with Daphne, but Daphne rejects him. Peter reveals that Miles went to help Petra and points out that they will get back together. Daphne finally runs into Miles again one day after work, where he admits to having panicked and gone to help Petra. He confesses he is in love with Daphne, but she rejects him and reveals her plans to leave Michigan. Daphne's mother consoles her and renews her confidence.

Daphne and Ashleigh repair their friendship after Daphne secretly paints Ashleigh's bedroom, and Daphne spends the next few days with Ashleigh until the Read-a-Thon. Julia informs Daphne that thanks to her encouragement, the siblings had discussed their troubled childhood. Before the Read-a-Thon begins, Daphne gets a supportive phone call from her father, where she finds out that Miles had driven hours to try and get him to return. Daphne realizes the truth of Miles' feelings.

The Read-a-Thon is a success. Afterwards, Miles professes his continuing love for Daphne and begs her to stay in Michigan with him. Daphne confesses her love and admiration for Miles, with the caveat that she will move into her own place for a while to avoid repeating her mistake with Peter.

One year later, Daphne and Miles host a housewarming party with their friends and family, where Daphne recounts the "funny story" of how she and Miles got together.

== Film adaptation ==
In July 2024, it was reported that Henry would be adapting Funny Story into a script for a feature film, produced by Lyrical Media and Ryder Picture Company. Henry and Lyrical's Jon Rosenberg were also named as executive producers. Around the release of People We Meet On Vacation (adapted from another of Henry's novels) in January 2025, Netflix announced that Funny Story would also be released on the platform.
