= Witches of Scotland =

Advocacy campaign to pardon historical witchcraft convictions

Witches of Scotland is a campaign for legal pardons and historic justice for the people, primarily women, convicted of witchcraft and executed in Scotland between 1563 and 1736. A formal apology was made on 8 March 2022. The campaign also aims to establish a national memorial for the convicted from the Scottish parliament.

Led by Claire Mitchell KC and writer Zoe Venditozzi, the campaign was launched on International Women's Day in 2020, and gained significant media coverage in 2021. The podcasts published by the campaign include contributions from Carolyn Jess Cooke, Sara Sheridan, Julia Campanelli, Julian Goodare and Alice Tarbuck.

== Historical background ==
In Scotland the Witchcraft Act remained in law till 1736. Witchcraft was a capital crime and punished by strangulation and burning at the stake. Claire Mitchell QC provides evidence that Scotland executed five times as many people per capita as anywhere else in Europe. An estimated 3837 people were accused, 2558 of whom were killed. 84% of the convicted were women.

The campaign website describes King James the VI of Scotland's involvement in what they describe as "Scotland's satanic panic". James considered himself an expert in witchcraft and wrote Daemonologie.

== Aims and accomplishments ==
The founders view the campaign as a women's rights issue due to the extreme discrepancy in the number of women convicted versus men. They see the pardoning and memorializing of these women as a statement against misogyny in the world today.

The campaign has three specific goals: a pardon for those convicted, a formal apology from the Scottish government, and a national memorial.

=== Pardon ===
The campaign seeks a legal pardon in order to acknowledge that those convicted of witchcraft were victims of injustice, and not criminals. In the background to their petition, Mitchell cites the Historical Sexual Offences Act 2018, as well as the Scottish Parliament's intent to pardon miners convicted during the 1984 miners strike, as precedent for righting historical wrongs in this manner.

A member's bill to clear the names of those accused was planned by SNP MSP Natalie Don. It received the support of First Minister Nicola Sturgeon in December 2021, and a consultation was launched in June 2022. Don believes that the increasing number of female Members of Scottish Parliament in recent years has been a positive factor in the progress of the bill.

=== Apology ===
The campaign sought an apology from the Scottish government, with the reasoning that many victims of the witch hunts were only accused, not convicted; a pardon could not be granted to these individuals. Mitchell states that a "public statement of regret" is necessary for these individuals for whom even the allegation of witchcraft was irrevocably damaging. Nicola Sturgeon offered a formal apology on International Women's Day 2022.

Remembering the Accused Witches of Scotland (RAWS), a related organization, additionally secured an apology from the Church of Scotland for its role in the persecution.

=== Memorial ===
The campaign seeks to obtain a national memorial to those affected by the witch trials. RAWS identified a potential site for the memorial in Kelty, Fife - a central location for many of the trials.

In January 2025, Witches of Scotland registered a tartan design with the Scottish Register of Tartans to serve as a memorial symbol for the victims of the witch trials. The tartan makes use of symbolic colors such as black, grey, red, and pink, respectively representing dark times, ashes, blood, and legal tape. Additionally, the sewing of the tartan uses numerical symbolism by invoking the years 1563 and 1736, as well as the 173 years during which the witch trials took place. A previous memorial tartan commemorating those accused of witchcraft in the Aberdeen area was created by multidisciplinary artist Sweætshops® for Wonderland Festival in 2022. Witches of Scotland have not responded to enquiries about the conceptual similarities between the memorials.

== Media ==
On 23 March 2025, two representatives appeared on BBC 3s Paranormal with Sian Eleri. They have also created a podcast, their own tartan and book. How to Kill a Witch by Claire Mitchell KC and Zoe Venditozzi is subtitled A Guide for the Patriarchy.

Claire

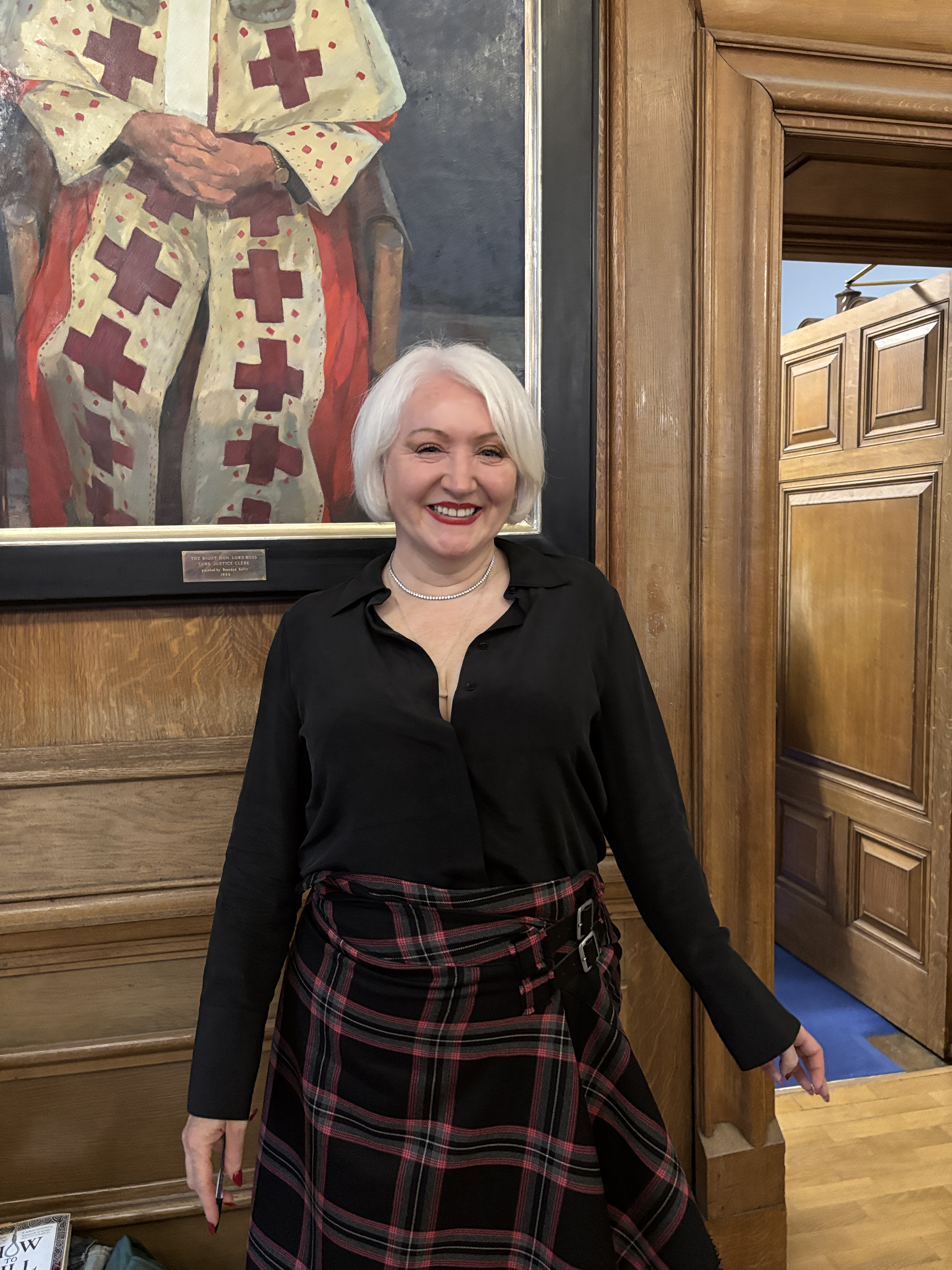

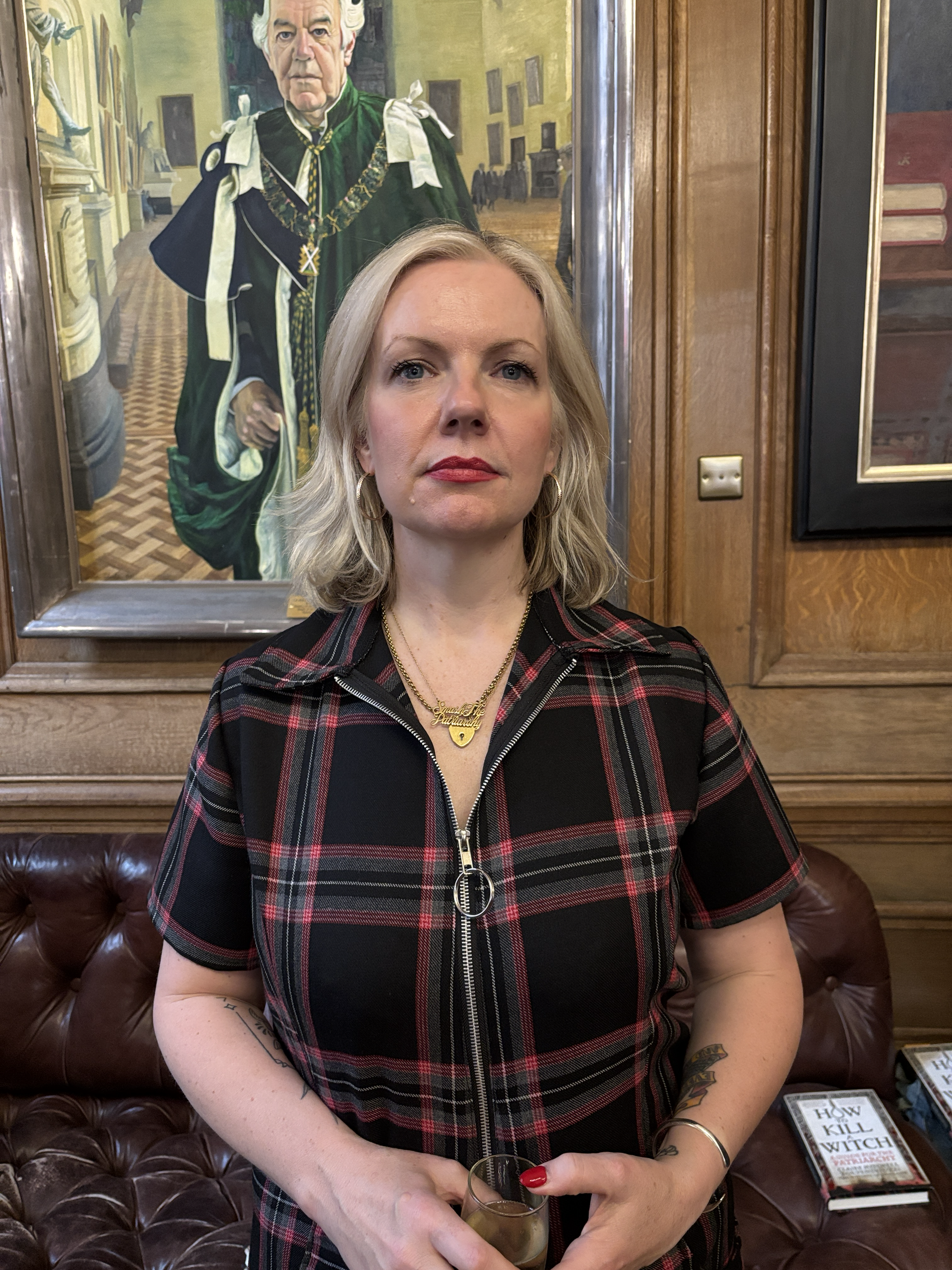

== See also ==
- Witch trials in early modern Scotland
- Great Scottish Witch Hunt of 1597
- Great Scottish Witch Hunt of 1661–62
- Great Scottish witch hunt of 1649–50
- Survey of Scottish Witchcraft
- List of people executed for witchcraft
