= The Spanish Love Deception =

2021 novel by Elena Armas

- Author: Elena Armas
- Language: English
- Genre: Romance
- Publication date: February 2021
- ISBN: 978-1-668-00253-7

The Spanish Love Deception is the debut novel by Elena Armas, self-published in February 2021. After becoming popular on TikTok, the book was picked up by Simon & Schuster, with an audiobook being released November 2021. A paperback version of the book was published by Atria Books on February 1, 2022, and became a New York Times best seller. BCDF Pictures acquired film rights to the novel in 2022.

== Synopsis ==
Catalina Martín, a Spanish woman living and working in New York City, has told her family that she will bring her American boyfriend to her sister's wedding in Spain, despite being single. With four weeks until the wedding, her colleague Aaron Blackford, whom she finds insufferable, offers to accompany her and pretend to be her boyfriend. They fall in love.

== Background and publication ==
Before becoming an author, Armas ran a book blog with a sizable following. She wrote The Spanish Love Deception during the COVID-19 lockdown and self-published it on Amazon in February 2021. The novel gained a wide readership through BookTok, where readers were particularly drawn to its male lead, Aaron Blackford. By June 2022, the novel had been published in more than 25 languages, and a companion novel, The American Roommate Experiment, was set for release that September. That month, BCDF Pictures hired Peter Hutchings, the director of The Hating Game, to adapt the novel for film, with Claude Dal Farra and Brian Keady producing.

== Reception ==
The Spanish Love Deception received a positive review from Publishers Weekly.

Awards for The Spanish Love Deception
Year	Award	Result	Ref.
2021	Goodreads Choice Award for Debut Novel	Winner	
2021	Goodreads Choice Award for Romance	Nominee	
