= The Princess Saves Herself in This One =

Collection of poetry by American poet Amanda Lovelace

First edition

The Princess Saves Herself in This One is the debut collection of poetry by American poet Amanda Lovelace, first self-published in 2016 through CreateSpace and then published by Andrews McMeel Publishing in 2017. Its narrative arc follows a princess who is learning to become her own savior; the semi-autobiographical book's author is the princess. It is the first installment in a series called Women Are Some Kind of Magic, which focuses on the resilience of women. The book won the Goodreads Choice Award for poetry in 2016.

== Sections ==
The Princess Saves Herself in This One has four sections, each showing the princess's progression in agreement with an overlying theme.

=== The Princess ===
The first section focuses mainly on the author, and her battles in the past. It goes through her relationships with family members, her younger life, and her past assault. This section ends when the princess locks herself away in a tower and waits for a prince to come and rescue her.

=== The Damsel ===
In the second section of poems the princess confronts the issues that have come in her life. They are represented in the ideas of the "big bad wolf" who has hurt her in the past and the dragons who have terrorized her, as well as talking about the death of her mother and her sister.

=== The Queen ===
The third section of poems, in which the princess stands up to face the dragon, deals with the grief she faced in losing her mother, and how she felt when she fell in love with the right person.

=== You ===
In the final section Lovelace encourages the reader to believe that they can deal with anything.

== Series and themes ==
According to one reviewer, The Princess Saves Herself in This One and the accompanying volumes "take some of the most recognized female archetypes — princess, witch, and soon, mermaid — and retells their narratives in a modern, feminist, empowered way". Lovelace said the book is about the abuse she has faced in her life, and added that the book was going to be uncomfortable for people. She told Bustle, "If there’s one thing I'm trying to do with this particular poetry series, it's to show the rich inner lives of women with a focus on our hidden everyday struggles".

The second volume, The Witch Doesn't Burn in This One, centers on a witch and deals with "anger and rape culture"; it was published in March 2018, again by Andrews McMeel. The Mermaid's Voice Returns In This One, about sexual trauma and healing, is published in the spring of 2019.

== Critical reception ==
Reviews of The Princess were mixed, and some controversy followed. Sales were going "remarkably well" for a collection of poetry.

E. Ce Miller, for The Bustle, said it was full of "autobiographical pain, subtle strength, and quiet resilience". Some, however, take issue with the idea of Instapoetry, a category under which the princess does fall. Instapoetry is poetry mostly posted on the social media site Instagram which closely follows the style of Charles Bukowski. The style is heavily criticized for its simplicity in the subjects. There has been debate as to whether the style is killing or reviving poetry.

=== Awards ===
- Goodreads Choice Award (2016, Poetry)
