= Girl, Wash Your Face =

2018 book by Rachel Hollis

Girl, Wash Your Face: Stop Believing the Lies About Who You Are So You Can Become Who You Were Meant to Be
- First edition cover
- Author: Rachel Hollis
- Language: English
- Subject: Self-help book
- Published: February 6, 2018
- Publisher: Thomas Nelson
- Publication place: United States
- Media type: Print, e-book, audiobook
- Pages: 240
- ISBN: 978-1-4002-0166-2 (Hardcover)
- Followed by: Girl, Stop Apologizing

Girl, Wash Your Face: Stop Believing the Lies About Who You Are So You Can Become Who You Were Meant to Be is a self-help book by American author Rachel Hollis published by Thomas Nelson in 2018.

Girl, Wash Your Face is described by The Washington Post as mixing "memoir, motivational tips, Bible quotations and common-sense girl talk." The prevailing message of her tome is one largely of female self-reliance, best summed up by Hollis in the book as "You, and only you, are ultimately responsible for how happy you are." The book has been wildly successful, described as a "publishing phenomenon" and was the second-most popular book of 2018 on Amazon.com. Girl, Wash Your Face is listed as a New York Times best-seller under the Advice, How-To, & Miscellaneous category.

The book is composed of 20 chapters centered on 20 lies Hollis said she formerly told herself—e.g. "I'll start tomorrow" and "I am defined by my weight"—and she goes on to explain how she successfully tackled each obstacle.

== Reception ==
The Gospel Coalition's Alisa Childers said Hollis can "tell a story that will have you crying one minute and shooting Diet Coke out of your nose the next" but ultimately was conflicted with the overall book. While Childers was sympathetic to many of the themes contained in the book, she felt that despite being marketed as a Christian book, its core message of lifting oneself up by their bootstraps as the solution to any problem came in lieu of "surrendering your life to Jesus and placing your trust in him alone." She also acknowledged that the book "exhausted" her. "It's all about what I can be doing better and what I'm not doing good enough," she observed. "How to be better at work, parenting, and writing. How to be less bad at cardio, sex, and you know, changing the world. But knowing the good news of who I am in Christ brings true rest."

BuzzFeed's Laura Turner was critical of the book's essential message, that "You, and only you, are ultimately responsible for who you become and how happy you are," which she characterized as a "lie." "Her core philosophy itself is emblematic of a huge division in American thought that dominates our national discourse: Are people who have problems responsible for fixing them themselves? Or is there some collective responsibility that we are shirking — does a society owe something to all its members?" Turner noted. "There are dark implications in making everything a matter of personal responsibility, which is Hollis's bias. She asks us to interrogate and deconstruct the lies that we've believed about ourselves, and I wonder how that lens would function if we turn it on the lies she promulgates in Girl, Wash Your Face."
