= Amanda Lovelace =

American poet

- Born: November 13, 1991 (age 34)
- Education: Kean University (B.A.)
- Occupation: Poet
- Spouse: Parker Lee
- Writing career
- Language: English
- Years active: 2016–present
- Notable works: women are some kind of magic trilogy; be your own fairytale trilogy
- Notable awards: Goodreads Choice Awards – Best Poetry 2016 the princess saves herself in this one; Goodreads Choice Awards – Best Poetry 2018 the mermaid’s voice returns in this one
- Website: amandalovelace.com

Amanda Lovelace (born November 13, 1991) is an American poet who rose to fame through her poetry posted to Tumblr and Instagram. Her works have feminist themes, often focusing on modern interpretations of traditional tales. She is the author of the women are some kind of magic series, including the Goodreads Choice Award-winning the princess saves herself in this one and women are some kind of magic.

== Personal life ==
Lovelace was born on November 13, 1991. Lovelace graduated with a BA in English and a minor in sociology from Kean University in May 2017. In 2017, she also married fellow poet Parker Lee. Lovelace uses she and they pronouns.

== Works ==
Lovelace initially self-published her first work, the princess saves herself in this one, with CreateSpace in 2016, but its success caught the attention of the traditional publishing industry. The collection was ultimately picked up in 2017 by the American publisher Andrews McMeel, who published her subsequent works as well. the princess saves herself in this one is autobiographical and deals with her experiences growing up.

The third volume, the mermaid’s voice returns in this one was released in 2019, and was listed on American Booksellers Association's "Indie Poetry Bestseller List". the mermaid's voice returns in this one was less well received than the previous title and was criticized for feeling stretched out and underwhelming.

According to Lovelace, this series aims "to show the rich inner lives of women with a focus on our hidden everyday struggles." Many of Lovelace's works deal with topics such as sexual abuse, trauma, and healing. Although the witch doesn’t burn in this one "speaks so explicitly to our current moment," the volume was actually completed before the revival of the #MeToo movement. Despite that, Lovelace notes that, "witch is still very much my #MeToo book. It will also not be the last one.” She has listed Speak by Laurie Halse Anderson and The Handmaid's Tale as influences.

Lovelace has rejected the label Instapoet, as she originally began posting her work to Tumblr, and only began publishing her work on Instagram after her first works had been published in print. Lovelace views criticism of Instapoets as a form of snobbery, associating the term as a way to set them apart from "real poets."

Lovelace also wrote Things That H(a)unt duology. The first installment, to make monsters out of girls, came out in 2018. The text "explores the memory of being in an abusive relationship" and "poses the eternal question: Can you heal once you’ve been marked by a monster?"

Her debut graphic novel, Books, Iced Coffee & a Side of Dragons, is due to be released in 2026.

== Bibliography ==
=== women are some kind of magic ===
- the princess saves herself in this one (2016)
- the witch doesn't burn in this one (2018)
- the mermaid's voice returns in this one (2019)
- slay those dragons: a journal for writing your own story (2019)
- the witch doesn't drown in this one (2026)

=== the things that h(a)unt ===
- to make monsters out of girls (2018)
- to drink coffee with a ghost (2019)

=== you are your own fairy tale ===
- break your glass slippers (2020)
- shine your icy crown (2021)
- unlock your storybook heart (2022)

=== Standalone works ===
- flower crowns and fearsome things (2021)
- believe in your own magic: a 45-card oracle deck & guidebook (2020)
- Books, Iced Coffee & a Side of Dragons: A Graphic Novel (2026); illustrated by Raquel Travé

=== Anthologized works ===
- [Dis]Connected: Poems & Stories of Connection and Otherwise (2018), edited by Michelle Halket
- His Hideous Heart: Thirteen of Edgar Allan Poe's Most Unsettling Tales Reimagined (2019), edited by Dahlia Adler
- Body Talk: 37 Voices Explore Our Radical Anatomy (2020), edited by Kelly Jensen
- Every Body Shines: Sixteen Stories About Living Fabulously Fat (2021), edited by Cassandra Newbould

== See also ==
- Instapoetry
