= Emily Henry =

American author (born 1991)

- Born: May 17, 1991 (age 35); Cincinnati, Ohio, U.S.
- Education: Hope College
- Occupations: Author, novelist
- Website: emilyhenrybooks.com

Emily Henry (born May 17, 1991) is an American author who is best known for her 2020s romance novels Beach Read, People We Meet on Vacation, Book Lovers, Happy Place, Funny Story, and Great Big Beautiful Life, all of which are New York Times bestsellers.

== Biography ==
Henry was born on May 17, 1991. She attended Lakota East High School in Liberty Township, Ohio, then Hope College on a creative writing scholarship with plans to study dance. She also completed a writing residency at the now-defunct New York Center for Art & Media Studies, part of Bethel University. She returned to Cincinnati after college; she currently lives and writes in Cincinnati and Northern Kentucky's Ohio River region. As of 2016, she was a full-time writer and proofreader.

== Writing career ==
Henry's debut young adult novel, The Love That Split the World, was published in January 2016. After writing several young adult novels, her first adult romance novel, Beach Read, was published in 2020, to widespread success. Henry's books have been featured in BuzzFeed, O, The Oprah Magazine, Entertainment Weekly, The New York Times, The Skimm, and Shondaland.

Henry continued to write adult romance novels. In 2021, People We Meet on Vacation was published. Book Lovers was published in 2022 and Happy Place in 2023. Funny Story was published in April 2024. Her sixth adult romance book, Great Big Beautiful Life, was published on April 22, 2025.

As of March 2023, Henry had sold more than 2.4 million books collectively.

Writing for Vulture in 2023, Allison P. Davis described Henry's books as containing elements of the rom-com and chick lit genres and focusing on themes of "respect" as well as love.

On September 23, 2026, Emily Henry officially announced her upcoming novel titled “Modern Classic” which is scheduled to be published on April 6th, 2027.

=== On-screen adaptations ===
The first five of Henry's adult romance books have been optioned for on-screen adaptations.

In October 2022, a film adaptation of People We Meet on Vacation by Sony's 3000 Pictures from a screenplay by Yulin Kuang was announced, with Brett Haley directing and Temple Hill producing. In September 2024, it was announced that Tom Blyth and Emily Bader would play Alex and Poppy. The movie was released on January 9, 2026. On April 5, 2023, it was announced that Kuang would also write and direct a film adaptation of Beach Read for 20th Century.

On March 28, 2023, a film adaptation of Book Lovers by the production company Tango was announced, with Sarah Heyward attached to write the script. Jennifer Lopez's production company, Nuyorican Productions, plans to develop Happy Place into a film for Netflix.

Henry plans to write the film adaptation for Funny Story herself.

== Bibliography ==
Young adult fiction

- The Love That Split the World (2016) ISBN 1595148515
- A Million Junes (2017) ISBN 0451478185
- When the Sky Fell on Splendor (2019) ISBN 0451480716
- Hello Girls with Brittany Cavallaro (2019) ISBN 0062803425

Adult fiction

- Beach Read (2020) ISBN 1643856049
- People We Meet on Vacation (2021) ISBN 1984806750
- Book Lovers (2022) ISBN 0593440870
- Happy Place (2023) ISBN 9780593441275
- Funny Story (2024) ISBN 9780593441282
- Great Big Beautiful Life (2025) ISBN 059344129X

== Awards ==
- 2021 Winner Goodreads Choice Awards - Best Romance for People We Meet on Vacation
- 2021 - New York Public Library Best Books for Adults 2021 – People We Meet on Vacation
- 2022 Winner Goodreads Choice Awards - Best Romance for Book Lovers
- 2023 Winner Goodreads Choice Awards - Best Romance for Happy Place
- 2024 Winner Goodreads Choice Awards - Best Romance for Funny Story
- 2024 Winner Goodreads Choice Awards - Best Audiobook for Funny Story
- 2025 Libby Book Award – Romance for Funny Story
- 2025 Winner Goodreads Choice Awards - Best Romance for Great Big Beautiful Life
