= How to Kill a Witch =

Book about women's history in Scotland, published 2025

How To Kill a Witch: A Guide for the Patriarchy
- Author: Claire Mitchell; Zoe Venditozzi
- Language: English
- Subject: Witch trials in early modern Scotland
- Genre: Non-fiction
- Publisher: Octopus Publishing Group
- Publication date: 2025
- Publication place: United Kingdom
- ISBN: 978-1-80096-188-3

How To Kill a Witch: A Guide for the Patriarchy is a non-fiction history book by human rights lawyer and campaigner Claire Mitchell KC and writer Zoe Venditozzi, co-founders of the Witches of Scotland campaign.

== History ==
Published in 2025 by the Octopus Publishing Group, the book documents early modern witch-hunts in Scotland, focusing on the approximately 4,000 people - predominantly women - prosecuted under the Witchcraft Act 1563 with an estimated 2,500 executed.

Mitchell and Venditozzi analyse these persecutions, looking at the entire process; the reasons women were accused - from neighbourhood squabbles to cheating spouses - and the types of torture utilised in order to secure confessions. The book also examines the witch trials' legacy in modern misogyny and justice systems.

"the belief system and social anxiety of the time created a perfect storm to find scapegoats and deal with them harshly" - Zoe Venditozzi.

In researching the book, the writers consulted historians, forensic scientists and researchers and reference sources such as the Survey of Scottish Witchcraft database where the names of the accused are collated from the original historic records.
