= Zoe Venditozzi =

Writer and podcaster (born 1975)

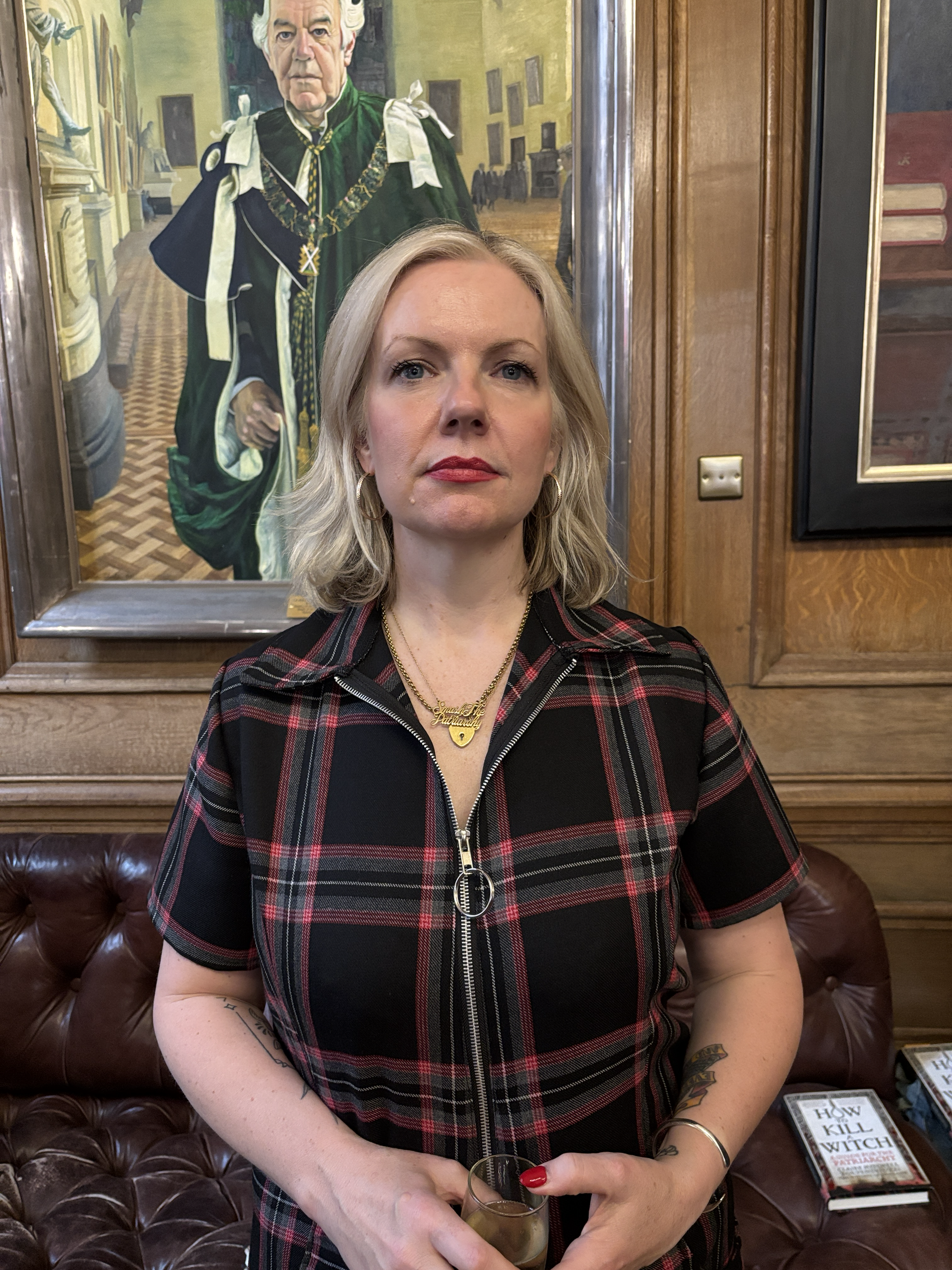
- Education: University of Glasgow
- Known for: Author, Campaigner for posthumous pardons for witches of Scotland

Zoe Venditozzi (born 1975) is a writer and podcaster living and working in Scotland. Born in Lancashire, England, she was raised in a small village in North East Fife and studied at the University of Dundee and the University of Glasgow. She won the Not the Booker Prize awarded by The Guardian newspaper in 2013 for her first novel Anywhere's Better Than Here. She led a Witches of Scotland campaign with Claire Mitchell KC, teaches creative writing workshops and is a teacher of Support for Learning.

Despite growing up in Fife, Venditozzi knew very little of the history of witches in the area before launching the campaign. Scotland, and Fife in particular, was prone to witch hunts. Historians at the University of Edinburgh have created a database survey of Scottish Witchcraft to record the men, women and their trials. Venditozzi gained a high profile as part of the Witches of Scotland campaign and is an invited speaker at Scottish literary events such as the Soutar and Paisley Book festivals.

Mitchell and Vebditozzi co-wrote How to Kill a Witch: A Guide For The Patriarchy' drawing on experiences of their campaign for official recognition of the miscarriage of justice in Scotland's historical witch trials. The book was launched in May 2025. and at an Edinburgh launch, she wore an outfit styled in the Witches tartan. In 2022, she and Claire Mitchell were made Doctors of Laws by the University of Dundee in recognition of their work
