= Emily Bader =

American actress (born 1996)

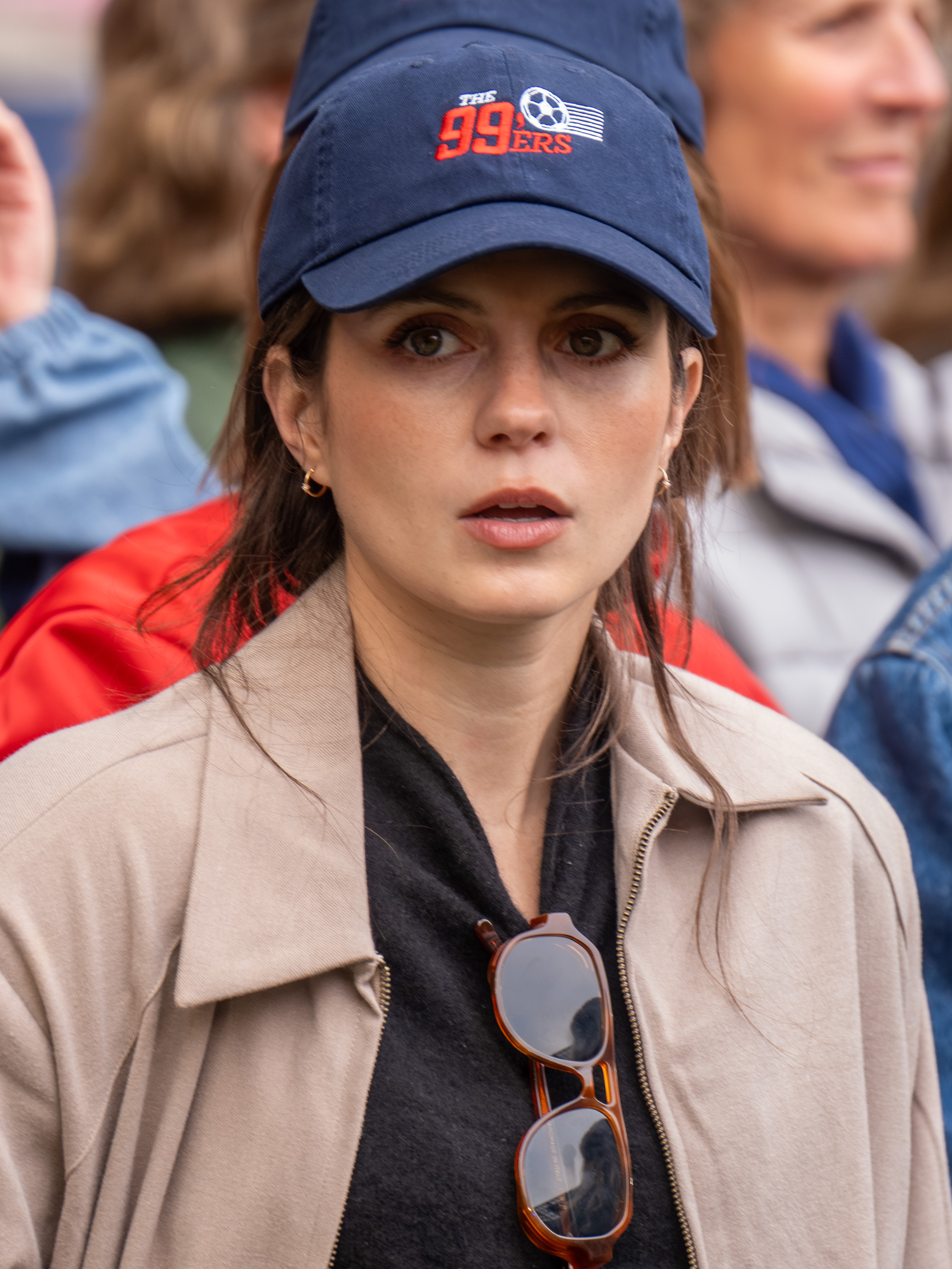
- Bader in 2026
- Born: November 8, 1996 (age 29); Temecula, California, U.S.
- Education: Loyola Marymount University
- Occupation: Actress
- Years active: 2016–present

Emily Bader (born November 8, 1996) is an American actress. She is known for her roles in the Amazon Prime series My Lady Jane (2024) and the Netflix film People We Meet on Vacation (2026).

== Early life ==
Emily Bader was born on November 8, 1996, in Temecula, California. She moved to Los Angeles after high school, where she studied theatre at Loyola Marymount University.

== Career ==
Bader made her professional theater debut at the Geffen Playhouse in Los Angeles in Our Very Own Carlin McCullough in 2018. In 2021, Bader had the lead role of Margot in Paranormal Activity: Next of Kin. In December that year, she was cast as a lead in the Jennifer Esposito project Fresh Kills as Esposito's daughter Rose. The film premiered at the Tribeca Festival in June 2023.

Bader appeared as Chloe on the fourth season of young adult fantasy series Charmed. In August 2022, she was cast as the eponymous Lady Jane Grey in Amazon MGM Studios eight-part historical comedy drama television series My Lady Jane alongside Edward Bluemel, Dominic Cooper and Jim Broadbent, which premiered on Amazon Prime Video in 2024. In 2026, she starred alongside Tom Blyth in the Netflix romantic comedy film People We Meet on Vacation, based on the novel of the same name.

Bader will portray professional soccer player Mia Hamm in Nicole Kassell's film The 99'ers, following the United States national team during the 1999 FIFA Women's World Cup.

== Filmography ==
=== Film ===
Year	Title	Role	Notes
2021	Paranormal Activity: Next of Kin	Margot	
2023	Fresh Kills	Rose	
2026	People We Meet on Vacation	Poppy Wright	
2027	The 99'ers	Mia Hamm	Filming

=== Television ===
Year	Title	Role	Notes
2016	Married with Secrets	Shannon Farris	Episode: "Fear the Ether Man"
2017	My Crazy Sex	Michelle	Episode: "Love Hurts"
2017	Game Shakers	Chiffon	Episode: "Bear Butt Laser Runner"
2017	The Stalker Club	Teressa	Television film
2017	Henry Danger	Chiffon	Episode: "License to Fly"
2017	House of the Witch	Lana Brady	Television film
2018	Stalked by a Reality Star	Kendra	Television film
2018	Broken Visions	Casey	4 episodes
2019–2022	Charmed	Chloe	5 episodes
2024	My Lady Jane	Lady Jane Grey	8 episodes

== Theater credits ==
Year	Title	Role	Venue
2018	Our Very Own Carlin McCullough	Carlin McCullough	Geffen Playhouse, Los Angeles
