= Alice Tarbuck =

Scottish academic, writer

Alice Tarbuck (born 1987 or 1988) is an academic, writer and literature professional based in Edinburgh.

Tarbuck grew up in Leith and has a younger sister. She earned a Bachelor of Arts and Master of Philosophy in English literature from Emmanuel College, Cambridge, as well as a doctorate from the University of Dundee. Her thesis explored poetry and practice of Thomas A. Clark. She taught creative writing at the University of Dundee. She writes about her experiences as a modern witch, and practices what she describes as 'intersectional, accessible' witchcraft.

Tarbuck published her debut book, A Spell in the Wild, in 2020. In 2022, she released The Modern Craft, which she co-edited with Scottish poet and novelist Claire Askew.

== Awards and honours ==
She won a Scottish Book Trust New Writer’s Award for poetry in 2019.

== Books ==
- Tarbuck, Alice (2020). A Spell in the Wild: A Year (and Six Centuries) of Magic. John Murray Press. ISBN 978-1-529-38087-3.
- Tarbuck, Alice; Askew, Claire, eds. (2022). The Modern Craft: Powerful Voices on Witchcraft Ethics. Watkins Media.
