= Rachel Hollis =

American author and motivational speaker

- Born: Weedpatch, California, U.S.
- Occupation: Author
- Spouse: Dave Hollis (m. 2004; died 2023) (Note: The couple separated in 2020 but were not legally divorced. Dave Hollis died in 2023.)
- Children: 4
- Writing career
- Genre: Self-help
- Notable works: Girl, Wash Your Face; Girl, Stop Apologizing
- Website: www.thehollisco.com

Rachel Hollis (/ˈhɒlɪs/) is an American author, motivational speaker, and blogger. She is the author of three self-help books, including Girl, Wash Your Face and Girl, Stop Apologizing.

== Early life and education ==
After graduating from high school, Hollis moved to Los Angeles, California, and got a job at Miramax. While working there, she met her future husband and founded an event-planning company called Chic Events.

== Career ==
Her breakthrough moment on social media came in March 2015, when an Instagram photo of her celebrating her stretch marks went viral. "I wear a bikini because I'm proud of this body and every mark on it. Those marks prove that I was blessed enough to carry my babies and that flabby tummy means I worked hard to lose what weight I could", she wrote in the post. It garnered more than ten million views.

Hollis' book Girl, Wash Your Face was described by The Washington Post as mixing "memoir, motivational tips, Bible quotations and common-sense girl talk." The prevailing message of Girl, Wash Your Face is one largely of female self-reliance, summed up by Hollis as "You, and only you, are ultimately responsible for how happy you are."

Since the success of her book, Hollis and her family have moved outside of Austin, Texas. She frequently posts YouTube videos with motivational messages, and has garnered over 163,000 subscribers.

In 2019, Hollis released a follow-up book, Girl, Stop Apologizing.

In 2019, Hollis founded the podcast syndicated network "Three Percent Chance." The network serves as the home for Straight Up with Trent Shelton, The Rachel Hollis Podcast, Start Today Morning Show, Rise Together Podcast, Talking Body with Amy Porterfield, and The New EDU podcast with Hope King and Wade King of Get Your Teach On. Rachel and Dave Hollis co-hosted a podcast titled RISE, which won Best Business Podcast at the 2019 iHeartRadio Podcast Awards.

On July 27, 2020, HarperCollins announced their intention to release a new book by Hollis on September 29, 2020. The book, entitled Didn't See That Coming, was about navigating through crisis, loss, and grief.

=== Plagiarism ===
On January 31, 2019, BuzzFeed News published an article by reporter Stephanie McNeal detailing multiple instances of Hollis plagiarizing quotes from other authors on her Instagram and explicitly attributing the quotes to herself, including quotes from RuPaul, Eleanor Roosevelt, Tim Hiller, Debra Condren, and Terry Cole-Whittaker. The article additionally pointed out that the title of Hollis's 2019 book, Girl, Stop Apologizing bore strong resemblance to Canadian professor and author Maja Jovanovic's 2016 book, Hey Ladies, Stop Apologizing.

In April 2020, the quote "Still I rise," plagiarized from Maya Angelou, was posted without attribution to Hollis's Instagram page. Hollis blamed the incident on her team following widespread public outrage and issued an apology.

=== TikTok controversy ===
In March 2021, a commenter called Hollis "unrelatable" for speaking about having a twice-weekly housekeeper who "cleans the toilets." In response, Hollis released a TikTok video in which she said, "What is it about me that made you think I want to be relatable? No, sis. Literally everything I do in my life is to live a life that most people can't relate to." The video's caption read "Harriet Tubman, RBG, Marie Curie, Oprah Winfrey, Amelia Earhart, Frida Kahlo, Malala Yousafzai, Wu Zetian … all Unrelatable AF. Happy Women's History Month." Vox wrote that "the post appeared clumsy at best and racist at worst. Was Hollis really saying that her struggles to build a brand as a lifestyle guru — a brand built on the sense she has created that she is just like her fans — was the same as Harriet Tubman escaping slavery and then going back to help other enslaved people escape? And was she really trying to tell her followers that she never wanted to be relatable after selling thousands of books telling them all the ways in which she was the same kind of person they were?" On April 4, Hollis released an initial apology for the video, in which she blamed her team for mishandling the situation. Eventually, Hollis deleted the original video and the initial apology and issued a new apology stating "I am so deeply sorry for the things I said in my recent posts and the hurt I have caused in the past few days. By talking about my own success, I diminished the struggles and hard work of many people who work tirelessly every day."

== Personal life ==
Rachel married Dave Hollis in 2004; the couple had four children together. They announced their separation in 2020. Dave Hollis died unexpectedly on February 11, 2023, at the age of 47, from a lethal combination of heart disease, ethanol, cocaine, and fentanyl.
