= Girl, Stop Apologizing =

2019 self-help book by Rachel Hollis

- First edition cover
- Author: Rachel Hollis
- Language: English
- Subject: Self-help book
- Published: March 12, 2019
- Publisher: HarperCollins
- Publication place: United States
- Pages: 240
- ISBN: 978-1400209606 (Hardcover)
- Preceded by: Girl, Wash Your Face

Girl, Stop Apologizing: A Shame-Free Plan for Embracing and Achieving Your Goals is a self-help book by American author Rachel Hollis. It follows her 2018 best-seller Girl, Wash Your Face. It was both a Publishers Weekly and New York Times best-seller.
