= People We Meet on Vacation =

2021 novel by Emily Henry

- First edition
- Author: Emily Henry
- Language: English
- Genre: Romantic Comedy
- Publisher: Berkley Books
- Publication date: May 11, 2021
- Publication place: United States
- Media type: Print
- ISBN: 9781984806758

People We Meet on Vacation is a romance novel by Emily Henry, published May 11, 2021 by Berkley Books, known as You and Me on Vacation in the UK and Australia. The book is a New York Times best seller.

== Summary ==
People We Meet on Vacation is told in a nonlinear narrative, interspersing its protagonist's present vacation with flashbacks from past trips. It follows Poppy Wright and Alex Nilsen, two best friends who are opposites in every way. She is an outgoing, wanderlust-filled wild child, while he is mild-mannered and introverted. Every summer they come together for a week long vacation, until a trip to Dubrovnik causes them to stop speaking for two years.

Although Poppy is living her dream of being a travel writer for R+R, a popular magazine, she realizes she was last truly happy when traveling with Alex. She rekindles their friendship to invite him on vacation, and she agrees to go with him to Palm Springs, California for his younger brother David's wedding.

Throughout the trip, Poppy recounts their friendship. They are both from the small town of Linfield in Ohio, and first met at the University of Chicago. Poppy was bullied in school and enjoyed writing about traveling as an escape. She and Alex began traveling together on a tight budget, and she kept her attraction to him in check.

Eventually, Alex moved back to Linfield to teach, and Poppy dropped out of college, moved to New York City, and began working for R+R. Their trips became more polished and less spontaneous as a result, and were also complicated by romance: Alex with his on-off girlfriend Sarah, and Poppy with various boyfriends.

In the present day, Alex and Poppy are aghast to arrive at a rented apartment with only one bed and a broken air conditioner. Poppy tries to take them to various tourist destinations around the city, but the heat makes both of them miserable. During a sudden rainstorm, they sleep together and admit their mutual feelings. They happily attend the wedding together. At the airport, Poppy admits that she saw this trip as an escape from her life, and Alex takes offense.

Poppy recalls that in Croatia, she and Alex had drunkenly kissed, but both had construed it as a rejection. Back in New York City, she begins therapy and realizes she tends to run from her problems, and her job is unfulfilling because she is no longer truly connecting with people on her trips. She flies back to Linfield, intending to reconcile with Alex. He admits that he is afraid that they are too different and is scared of losing her like he lost his mother. Alex and Poppy finally become a couple, splitting their time between New York and Linfield.

== Characters ==
=== Poppy Wright ===
The main character of the novel, Poppy, is a travel blogger and writer for a magazine. She is described as being out-going and wild, always looking for new adventures. She moved away from her hometown in Linfield, Ohio due to bullying.

=== Alex Nilsen ===
Poppy's best friend in his 30s, who is quite her opposite. He prefers staying in his hometown to build a family and settle down. He works as an English teacher at a high school in Linfield.

=== Rachel Krohn ===
Poppy's best friend in New York who is a social media influencer and an artist. Rachel was the one who advised Poppy to rekindle her bond with Alex in order to find out what would make her happy.

=== Sarah Torval ===
Alex's on-and-off girlfriend throughout the story. Alex first meets her at the library and she also teaches at the same school as Alex.

=== Swapna Bakshi-Highsmith ===
Poppy's boss at her magazine company who encourages her to travel. She was described to be stylish and meticulous, serving as a role model for Poppy.

== Reception ==
People We Meet on Vacation is a New York Times and IndieBound best seller.

The book received starred reviews from Library Journal and Kirkus, as well as positive reviews from The Washington Post, the Associated Press, and Publishers Weekly.

In a starred review, Kirkus describes the novel as a "warm and winning When Harry Met Sally… update that hits all the perfect notes." Library Journal explains in its starred review that Henry’s book is a story that will appeal to those who "are drawn to stories with emotion, poetic language, and a strong sense of place" and compares it to Kate Clayborn’s Love Lettering. Alicia Rancilio of the Associated Press praises Henry's dialogue, commenting "The banter between Poppy and Alex is so natural, quick and witty that it would make Shonda Rhimes do a slow clap." From The Washington Post, Angela Hurt applauds Henry, saying she "masterfully depicts early-30s uncertainty and angst, adding an interesting personal-growth dimension to the story." Hurt, however, also claims that it still fails to live up to Henry’s previous novel stating, "People lacks the pizazz — the special spark — that helped Beach Read shine." Publishers Weekly concurred, saying that "Henry’s latest rom-com lacks the spark of 2020’s Beach Read, but still offers plenty of lighthearted summertime fun."

Awards for People We Meet on Vacation
Year	Award	Result	Cite
2021	Goodreads Choice Award for Romance	Winner	
2021	Kirkus Reviews' Best Books of 2021	Selection	
2021	Swoon Awards	Runner-up	

== Film adaptation ==
A film adaptation was announced in October 2022, with Brett Haley attached to direct and Temple Hill Entertainment to produce. In August 2024, Netflix announced that they would produce the movie with Sony Pictures, and that Tom Blyth and Emily Bader were cast in the roles of Alex and Poppy, respectively. Filming began in New Orleans, Louisiana in fall 2024 and the movie premiered on January 9, 2026.
