= Beach Read =

2020 novel by Emily Henry

- First edition
- Author: Emily Henry
- Language: English
- Genre: Fiction, Romance
- Publisher: Berkley Books
- Publication date: May 2, 2020
- Publication place: United States
- ISBN: 1984806734

Beach Read is a 2020 contemporary romance novel by Emily Henry. An audiobook was released by Penguin Random House Audio.

== Synopsis ==
January Andrews is a successful romance novel writer who is struggling after the death of her father and the discovery that he was having an affair. While living in his old beach house to prepare to sell it, she runs into Augustus Everett, her former rival in college and now an acclaimed literary fiction author. They reconnect and bond over struggling with writer’s block; they challenge each other to spend the summer writing a novel in each other’s genres.

== Plot ==
January Andrews and Augustus "Gus" Everett are two writers with opposing styles. January writes best-selling romance novels with happy endings, while Gus writes critically acclaimed literary fiction with darker themes. Both are facing writer's block and personal crises: January's father recently died, leaving her with a lake house she didn't know he owned, and Gus is dealing with his own complicated past.

They end up spending the summer as neighbors in the lake house community. To break their creative blocks, they make a bet: each will try to write in the other's genre. January will write a literary novel, and Gus will pen a romance. As they embark on research outings and writing sessions together, they begin to understand and appreciate each other's perspectives and struggles.

Through their interactions, they confront their own emotional baggage, secrets, and fears. The line between professional rivalry and personal connection blurs, leading to unexpected romantic developments. Ultimately, their summer challenge helps them grow as writers and individuals, and they find healing and love in each other's company.

As the summer progresses, their connection deepens, and they start to envision a future beyond their temporary arrangement. Their journey is not just about overcoming writer's block but also about finding themselves and each other. The novel concludes with both characters embarking on new chapters in their lives, filled with hope, creativity, and the promise of lasting love.

== Reception ==
Beach Read was a New York Times Bestseller. It was listed in the Indie Next List for June 2020 and chosen as one of The Oprah Magazine's 38 Romance Novels That Are Set to Be the Best of 2020. PopSugar named it the Best Romance Book of 2020. The novel was nominated for the Goodreads Choice Award for Best Romance, coming in second place.

Kirkus Reviews called Beach Read a "heartfelt look at taking second chances, in life and in love." A Publishers Weekly review said: "Readers are sure to fall hard for this meta, heartfelt take on the romance genre."

== Film adaptation ==
In April 2023, it was announced that Beach Read is being adapted into a feature film for 20th Century Studios. Yulin Kuang is set to direct the film with Original Film producing. In February 2026, Phoebe Dynevor was cast in the lead role. In April 2026, Patrick Schwarzenegger joined as co-star.
