= Rebecca Ross =

American author of young adult fiction

- Education: University of Georgia
- Occupation: Novelist
- Writing career
- Language: English
- Years active: 2015–present
- Genres: Young adult fiction, adult fantasy
- Notable work: Letters of Enchantment series
- Website: rebeccarossauthor.com

Rebecca Ross is an American author of young adult novels and adult fantasy, best known for her New York Times bestselling Letters of Enchantment duology.

== Early life ==
Ross grew up in Atlanta, Georgia.

She studied English at the University of North Georgia (then called Gainesville State College), and then transferred to the University of Georgia. She initially pursued a degree in nutrition and dietetics but decided to instead get a degree in English. She has previously worked at a Colorado dude ranch and as a librarian.

== Personal life ==
She is a fan of Jane Austen and says her writing is influenced by Juliet Marillier and Melina Marchetta. Her favorite folklore is East o’ the Sun, West o’ the Moon.

As of 2023, she lives in Northeast Georgia with her husband.

== Letters of Enchantment duology ==
The first book, Divine Rivals, a historical fantasy young adult novel, is about two rival journalists and war correspondents who fall in love amid a battle between the gods. It came out in April 2023, from Wednesday Books.

The idea for the story first came to her when she was struggling with writer's block in 2020, inspired by You've Got Mail and The Shop Around the Corner, two of her favorite films. The story is also inspired by World War I.

=== Reception ===
Reviews for the first novel, Divine Rivals, were mixed. Cosmopolitan commented on the WWI references in Divine Rivals as "frustrating." Kirkus Reviews said it's "Ideal for readers seeking perspectives on war, with a heavy dash of romance and touch of fantasy." School Library Journal noted that a sequel may be necessary for the story to read as satisfying. Publishers Weekly called it "an ardent romance and a harrowing exploration of war’s horrors and heartbreaks." As of January 2024, Divine Rivals has spent 29 weeks on the New York Times Young Adult Hardcover bestseller list.

The Nerd Daily described Ruthless Vows as "not nearly as magical" [as the previous book] "but it’s still undeniably exciting." It debuted on the New York Times Young Adult Hardcover bestseller list at #1.

- The Queen's Rising, HarperTeen, February 2018
- Sisters of Sword and Song, HarperTeen, June 2020
- Dreams Lie Beneath, Quill Tree, November 2021
- Elements of Cadence duology
  - A River Enchanted, Harper Voyager, February 2022
  - A Fire Endless, Harper Voyager, December 2022
- Letters of Enchantment duology
  1. Divine Rivals, Wednesday Books, April 2023
  2. Ruthless Vows, Wednesday Books, December 2023
