= Sarah Heyward =

American television writer and producer

- Born: June 28, 1984 (age 42)
- Education: Harvard College (BA); University of Iowa (MFA)
- Occupations: Producer, screenwriter
- Years active: 2012–present
- Website: Official website

Sarah Heyward (born June 28, 1984) is an American television writer and producer from Los Angeles. Her credits include Girls (2012), SKAM Austin (2018), and Modern Love (2021). Heyward is a daughter of former CBS News President Andrew Heyward.

== See also ==
- List of Girls episodes
- 65th Writers Guild of America Awards
