= Claire Mitchell =

Scottish lawyer

Claire Mitchell KC
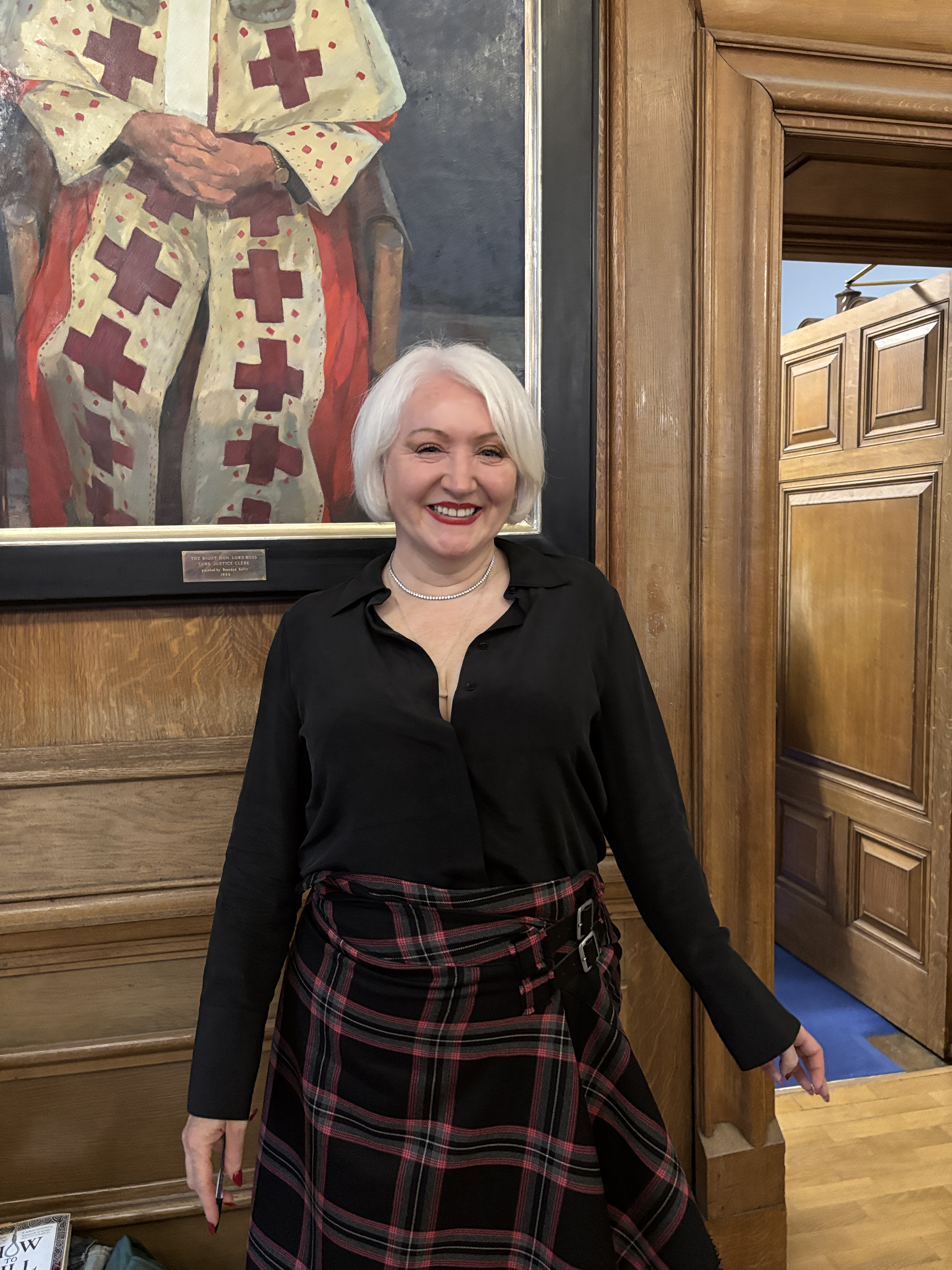
- Education: University of Glasgow
- Occupations: Kings Counsel, Criminal Defence Advocate
- Employer: Compass Chambers
- Known for: Campaign for posthumous pardons for witches of Scotland

Claire Mitchell is a Kings Counsel working in Scotland. She has a particular interest in constitutional, human rights and sentencing questions. She also leads the Witches of Scotland campaign to achieve a pardon, an apology and a memorial for victims of the Scottish Witch Trials.

== Career ==
Mitchell has an honours degree in law from the University of Glasgow. She was a solicitor in private practice from 1996 and was called at the Bar in 2003. She became a Queen's Counsel (QC, now KC) in 2019. She was President of the Scottish Criminal Bar Association from 2016 to 2018.

Mitchell represented Sheku Bayoh’s family in 2023 and highlighted the issues of racism in the case. She represented the Scottish Covid Bereaved group in the Scottish Covid-19 Inquiry

She supports the use of new technology to ensure business continuity for law courts in the wake of the COVID-19 pandemic She said “Covid has forced us all well past where we thought we would be in 2021. We are now seeing the benefits of investing in technology. Measures which increase efficiency save money which can then be reinvested in measures which increase efficiency – it’s a virtuous circle.”

=== Witches of Scotland campaign ===
Mitchell leads the 'Witches of Scotland' campaign with Zoe Venditozzi to seek posthumous justice for women historically convicted and executed as witches in Scotland. The campaign used social media to reach the public and a petition to the Scottish Parliament as a way to influence policy makers.

The campaign has three goals: a pardon for those convicted, a formal apology from the Scottish government, and a national memorial. Mitchell hopes that laws used to dispense historic pardons can be used in these cases, as they have been done for the people in Salem, Massachusetts . In the background to their petition, Mitchell cites the Historical Sexual Offences Act 2018, as well as the Scottish Parliament's intent to pardon miners convicted during the 1984 miners strike, as precedent for righting historical wrongs in this manner.

Publications

She and Venditozzi authored the book 'How to Kill a Witch: A Guide For The Patriarchy' drawing on experiences of their campaign for official recognition of the miscarriage of justice in Scotland's historical witch trials. The book was launched in May 2025 in Edinburgh. Mitchell wore an outfit featuring the Witches of Scotland tartan.

== Other roles ==
Mitchell is on the panel of the Bloody Scotland book club. She is one of the legal experts involved in the 2021 TV series Murder Island, based on a drama written by Ian Rankin.

== Awards and recognition ==
Mitchell received a 'Special Recognition Award' in 2013 from Law Awards of Scotland.

In 2022, she and Venditozzi were made Doctors of Laws by the University of Dundee in recognition of their work.
