= List of Wayward Pines characters =

Wayward Pines is an American mystery, science fiction television series based on the Wayward Pines novels by Blake Crouch. Developed for television by Chad Hodge, the pilot was directed by M. Night Shyamalan, with both as executive producers. The series premiered May 14, 2015 on Fox. On December 9, 2015, Fox renewed the series for a second season which premiered on May 25, 2016.

Below is a list of characters central to the series.

== Main cast ==
=== Ethan Burke ===
Ethan Burke (Matt Dillon) is a U.S. Secret Service agent and the main protagonist of season 1. In the pilot episode, he is dispatched by Adam Hassler, his supervisor, to locate Agent Kate Hewson (with whom Ethan also had an extramarital affair) and another agent named Stallings. Hewson and Stallings had previously been sent to Wayward Pines to find a missing agent named Evans, and had never reported back to Hassler. After awaking in Wayward Pines following a serious car accident en route, Ethan is reunited with his family, but learns they cannot escape the town. He runs afoul of strict Sheriff Arnold Pope, ultimately killing him in self defense, and is then appointed Sheriff himself by David Pilcher. Pilcher reveals the truth about Wayward Pines to Ethan, who agrees to help Pilcher keep order, but only if he can do things his own way. During an Abbie attack in the final episode of season 1, Ethan sacrifices himself to save what's left of humanity.

=== Kate Hewson ===
Kate Hewson (Carla Gugino) is Ethan's former lover and one of the missing agents he is initially trying to find in season 1. When Ethan does locate her in town, she is noticeably older, which confuses him. She is married to Harold Ballinger, a local toy shop owner, and claims to have lived in the town for 12 years. Kate whispers to Ethan that she has learned the best way to survive is to lie low and play along, but Ethan later learns she is leading a rebel group that is working to escape Wayward Pines. When Ethan tells her the truth about what lies beyond the walls of the town, Kate does not believe him, thinking he must have been brainwashed by Pilcher. She tells Theresa, Ethan's wife, that within her first week in town she got a call out to Hassler, who simply told her she was part of a government experiment. Ethan eventually jails Kate and her co-conspirators. While in jail, the conspirators are all shot and killed by Jason Higgins, but Ethan arrives to shoot Jason before he can turn the gun on Kate. In the season 2 opener, Kate survives a surgery performed by Theo Yedlin, only to take her own life after a conversation with Megan Fisher.

=== David Pilcher ===
David Pilcher (Toby Jones) is introduced in the series premiere as Dr. Jenkins, a psychiatrist at Wayward Pines Hospital who offers to treat Ethan. After Ethan successfully escapes the town and is in danger of an Abbie attack, Jenkins rescues him by helicopter and for the first time identifies himself as David Pilcher, the scientist who predicted the Abbie mutations and thus created Wayward Pines to save humanity. Pilcher reveals the truth about Wayward Pines and says he needs Ethan's help to maintain order. Ethan eventually defies Pilcher in the penultimate episode of season 1, letting the entire town also know the truth. Angered, Pilcher shuts off the electrified fence, leading to the Abbie attack in the season finale. Pilcher is killed by his own sister, Pam, in that episode, but the character makes multiple appearances in season 2 flashback sequences.

=== Theresa Burke ===
Theresa Burke (Shannyn Sossamon) is Ethan's wife who, along with their son Ben, leaves Seattle to try and find Ethan in season 1. The car that Theresa and Ben are traveling in is sabotaged by Sheriff Pope on the outskirts of town, and crashes. As a Wayward Pines resident, Theresa is offered a job as a realtor when Peter McCall quits. Like Kate, Theresa finds Ethan's "truths" regarding Wayward Pines hard to believe, but her job as a realtor allows her to discover the truth on her own, when she locates a passage from the town to Pilcher's mountain complex, from an unused lot as Plot 33. In the complex, she plays a video of Hassler making a report from the ruins of San Francisco, and Ethan's stories now make sense. In one of Theresa's four (guest) appearances in season 2, she tells Hassler that he is responsible for the deaths of Ethan and Ben. While outside the wall mourning Ben, she is attacked by Abbies. She later dies in the hospital with a despondent Hassler looking on.

=== Harold Ballinger ===
Harold Ballinger (Reed Diamond) is a toymaker and Kate's husband. He is a co-conspirator in Kate's plans to escape the town, getting him jailed by Ethan. In season 1, while in jail with other conspirators, Harold is shot and killed by Jason Higgins.

=== Adam Hassler ===
Adam Hassler (Tim Griffin) is Ethan's boss at the Secret Service. In the series premiere, he is shown dispatching Ethan to find Agents Hewson and Stallings. Later that episode, he meets with "Dr. Jenkins", who tells him "everything is going as planned." The character makes only sporadic season 1 appearances, one of them in a video report that Theresa finds. In that report from the ruins of San Francisco, Hassler notes that he still hasn't found any humans, only Abbies. In season 2, a bearded and disheveled Hassler makes it back to Wayward Pines, and he is revealed to be one of 12 "nomads" Pilcher sent out to assess the earth outside Wayward Pines many years ago. He is the only nomad to make it back alive, and thus knows more about the Abbies than anyone. Having learned that Hassler worked closely with Pilcher, Theresa blames him for the deaths of Ethan and Ben. Through flashbacks, we learn that Hassler fell in love with Theresa when she briefly separated from Ethan over his affair with Kate. Hassler is shown telling Pilcher he wants to "call it off" after Theresa and Ben go look for Ethan, but Pilcher just replies "it's done."

=== Ben Burke ===
Ben Burke (Charlie Tahan) is Ethan and Theresa's son. As a member of the First Generation and a student at Wayward Pines Academy, Ben learns the truth about Wayward Pines before his father or mother do. He is "paired" with fellow student Amy for purposes of reproduction, and the two seem to have a genuine affection for each other. In the events of the season 1 finale that result in Ethan's death, Ben is injured. He awakes in the hospital to find out from Amy that three years have passed, and Ben walks through the town to see what it has become under Jason's rule. Ben makes two appearances in season 2, leading a group of underground rebels opposed to Jason's iron hand, which gets him banished outside the fence, where he is eventually killed by Abbies.

=== Beverly ===
Beverly (Juliette Lewis) is a bartender in Wayward Pines who bonds with Ethan in the series premiere. She helps him find the corpse of Agent Evans as well as a map of the town. She and Ethan plan an escape, but Beverly is caught and executed by Sheriff Pope in a public reckoning.

NOTE: Though billed as a main cast member, Lewis only appears in three season 1 episodes. Because of the time it took Wayward Pines to make it to air, Lewis had committed to another series in the interim.

=== Pamela Pilcher ===
Pamela Pilcher (Melissa Leo) is a nurse at Wayward Pines Hospital and is the first person Ethan sees after waking up in the series premiere. Initially known only as "Nurse Pam", she is later revealed to be the sister of David Pilcher. Pam was fanatically devoted to her brother's vision, but begins to have doubts about how he is running the town and treating its citizens, which comes to a head when David shuts off power to the fence. Believing Pam to be undermining him, David orders her to be put back into cryo suspension, but other volunteers rebel on Pam's behalf, freeing her and allowing her to kill her brother in the season 1 finale. Pam makes one appearance in season 2, in which she shows that she is the only person to finally recognize that the feeble attempt to salvage Homo sapiens – the species completely responsible for the end of its own existence and the evolutionary ascendancy of the Abbies – is "a mistake". She tries to convince Jason that the repeated cycle of hatred that the humans of Wayward Pines keeps showing is proof that this last remnant of humanity should be left to die off peacefully. She attempts to infect the townspeople with the smallpox virus, but the attempt fails and she is executed by Jason.

=== Arnold Pope ===
Arnold Pope (Terrence Howard) is the strict and feared original sheriff of Wayward Pines, who serves as Ethan's initial antagonist. In the third episode of season 1, Ethan manages to wrestle Pope's gun from him, then shoots and kills him.

Flashbacks reveal that Pope was a bright but disgruntled security guard whom Pilcher recruited as a volunteer.

In a season 2 flashback, he is shown in Hawaii trying to convince Dr. Theo Yedlin to listen to a proposition.

NOTE: Though billed as a main cast member in season 1, Howard appeared in only four episodes that season. Because of the time it took Wayward Pines to make it to air, he had committed to another series in the interim.

=== Dr. Theo Yedlin ===
Dr. Theodore "Theo" Yedlin (Jason Patric) is a confident, driven surgeon who awakes in Wayward Pines in the season 2 premiere. His medical and leadership skills prove invaluable to the residents of the town. While learning the truth about Wayward Pines, he becomes diametrically opposed to Jason's leadership methods. He is reunited with his wife Rebecca, only to find that she has been a Wayward Pines resident for three years, and that she married Xander. Along with Hassler, Yedlin is the only person who considers the Abbies to be highly intelligent, but his attempt to prove it angers Jason and Megan. Despite his belief, in the series finale, he makes plans to inject himself with three deadly infectious diseases (typhoid, Marburg virus, and the bubonic plague) and let the Abbies eat him, hoping to commit genocide of that entire species before the last few hundred humans awake again. Kerry discovers the plan and injects herself.

=== Rebecca Yedlin ===
Rebecca Yedlin (Nimrat Kaur) is Theo's wife and a successful architect. She is introduced in the season 2 premiere, having an argument with Theo while they are at a resort in Hawaii. After Theo awakes in Wayward Pines, he sees Rebecca in a crowd, and she reveals she has been there for three years. It is also revealed that Rebecca designed and planned Wayward Pines before learning the truth from Megan about when it would be built. She refused to volunteer, but Pilcher had her abducted anyway. In another shocking revelation, Rebecca tells Theo she is married to Xander, and it is later learned she is carrying Xander's baby.

=== Xander Beck ===
Xander Beck (Josh Helman) is introduced in season 2 as a confident and charming member of Ben Burke's rebel group, working to undermine Wayward Pines from within. Like Ben, Xander is banished to the other side of the fence, but he makes it back after encountering the returning Adam Hassler. Xander is returned to his job at McConigle's ice cream and fudge shop, but is under the close watch of Jason and his associates. It is revealed that he married Rebecca before Theo was awoken, and that Rebecca is pregnant with his child.

=== Jason Higgins ===
Jason Higgins (Tom Stevens) is introduced in the 9th episode of season 1 as the leader of the First Generation. He shoots and kills Kate's co-conspirators while they sit in jail, but is shot by Ethan before he can turn the gun on Kate. In the season finale, he is rescued by other First Generation members and survives the gunshot wound, later shown three years in the future as the new sheriff of Wayward Pines.

He becomes the main antagonist in season 2, ruling the town with an iron hand. He is in love with Kerry Campbell. After accidentally being shot in the chest during a struggle with Kerry, Theo tries to save him only for Jason to flatline on the operating table. It's heavily suggested that Theo purposefully botched the surgery so that Jason would die. The fight leading up to his death was caused by Jason discovering that he's actually Kerry's son and suspecting wrongly that Kerry already knew and was manipulating him.

=== Kerry Campbell ===
Kerry Campbell (Kacey Rohl) is a First Generation resident who is a tough and unflappable part of the new Wayward Pines brain trust in season 2. While devoted to Pilcher's vision and supportive of Jason, whom she loves, she begins to think for herself after conversations with Theo and Rebecca, and questions many of Jason's decisions. It's revealed near the end of season 2 that Pilcher originally met with Kerry while he was recruiting volunteers, at which time she was a vulnerable, single mother-to-be. Kerry is in fact Jason's mother, though she doesn't discover this until after shooting Jason in self-defense, leading to his death. In the series finale, Kerry sacrifices herself as a disease-infected (typhoid, Marburg virus, and bubonic plague) form of biological warfare against the Abbies, hoping to commit genocide of that entire species in order to save the few hundred humans left on Earth.

=== Megan Fisher ===
Megan Fisher (Hope Davis, recurring role in season 1) is an original Wayward Pines resident who becomes a teacher and later principal at Wayward Pines Academy. Megan is the wife of Mayor Brad Fisher. It is revealed that she was a hypnotherapist in her prior life. At the academy, Megan tries to shape young minds, revealing the truth about Wayward Pines and imploring her students to not tell their parents. She is fanatically devoted to Pilcher's vision, remaining so until her death at the hands of the female Abbie "Margaret" in season 2.

=== C.J. Mitchum ===
Christopher James "C.J." Mitchum (Djimon Hounsou) is a historian and an original resident of Wayward Pines. Introduced in season 2 as a former engineer, it is C.J. who observed the slow decline and elimination of the human race, having been awoken from his cryo chamber for one day every 20 years (less than four months of 'awake' time), per Pilcher's instructions.

== Recurring cast ==
=== Ruby Davis ===
Ruby Davis (Greta Lee) is a waitress at The Excellent Bean, the café in Wayward Pines. Ruby debuted in Season 1 Episode 1 as the eyes and ears of the town, however was later suspected by Pilcher to be investigated by Sheriff Burke. Ruby was shot and killed for being a rebel in Season 2, Episode 1 during a reckoning conducted by Jason Higgins.

=== Arlene Moran ===
Arlene Moran (Siobhan Fallon Hogan) is the secretary at the Sheriff's office in season 1. In season 2, she is shown being tortured at the hospital by members of the First Generation, and is later revealed to be working as a hospital receptionist.

=== Brad Fisher ===
Brad Fisher (Barclay Hope) is Megan's husband and the Mayor of Wayward Pines in season 1.

In a past life, Brad Fisher was the vice president of a telecommunications company with a wife, a son, and a daughter before he was selected to be part of the Wayward Pines project.

Following the death of Arnold Pope, Brad Fisher first appears where he swears in Ethan Burke as the new sheriff, and is even photographed with Ethan. When Ethan asked who appointed him sheriff, Brad stated that it wasn't one of his functions to do.

He dies sometime between seasons 1 and 2.

=== Amy ===
Amy (Sarah Jeffery) is Ben's girlfriend and fellow Wayward Pines Academy student. In the season 1 finale, she is shown to be a nurse three years in the future. However, she does not appear in season 2.

=== Peter McCall ===
Peter McCall (Justin Kirk) is a real estate agent who, like Ethan, questions the mystery of Wayward Pines. As a marked man headed for a reckoning, he helps Ethan locate the one area of town that will allow for an escape. He then electrocutes himself on the fence and makes it look like Ethan did it, knowing it will help Ethan gain the respect of those in charge.

=== Tim Bell ===
Tim Bell (Chad Krowchuk) is the front desk receptionist at the Wayward Pines Hotel. He encounters both Ethan and Theo after their initial awakening, as the hotel is often used to quarter new arrivals.

=== Big Bill ===
Big Bill (Mike McShane) is a real estate agent and Theresa's boss. When Theresa constantly asks questions about Plot 33 and why no one lives there, Big Bill keeps telling her to forget about it. He is overcome by Abbies in the season 1 finale and killed.

=== Henrietta ===
Henrietta (Teryl Rothery) is Big Bill's assistant and the bookkeeper at the real estate office.

=== Franklin Dobbs ===
Franklin Dobbs (Ian Tracey) is officially a clockmaker in Wayward Pines. In season 1, it is revealed that he used to be a bomb maker and is a co-conspirator with Kate. While in jail in the penultimate episode of season 1, he is shot and killed by Jason Higgins.

=== Mario ===
Mario (Christopher Meyer) is a soldier from the First Generation who serves as Jason's eyes and ears in the field.

=== Frank Armstrong ===
Frank Armstrong (Michael Garza) is a student at Wayward Pines Academy and a member of the First Generation. He gets paired with another young woman for the purpose of impregnating her, per Megan's orders, but Frank cannot complete the task. It is suggested at that point that he might be gay.

=== Lucy Armstrong ===
Lucy Armstrong (Emma Tremblay) is Frank's younger sister, also a student at Wayward Pines Academy and a member of the First Generation. Although not quite 12 years old, she starts menstruating, which means she must now be paired up to reproduce, per Megan's mandate.

=== Oscar ===
Oscar (Amitai Marmorstein) is a member of the First Generation and a determined but inexperienced doctor at Wayward Pines hospital. As such, he tries to learn all he can from Theo.

=== Sean ===
Sean (R.J. Fetherstonhaugh) is a soldier from the First Generation.

=== Margaret ===
Margaret (Rochelle Okoye) is the first female Abbie to be captured and studied by humans, and is revealed by Hassler to be the Abbies' leader. She got the name Margaret from a lab assistant, who says she reminds him of a coldhearted schoolgirl he once knew by that name. During his studies, Theo learns that the reasoning center in Margaret's brain is twice the size of a typical human's.

=== Simeon ===
Simeon (Jaime Callica) is a teacher.
