= Recursion (disambiguation) =

Recursion is the process of repeating items in a self-similar way.

Recursion may also refer to

- Recursive self-improvement, a method of artificial intelligence that could lead to artificial general intelligence
- Recursion (computer science), a method where the solution to a problem depends on solutions to smaller instances of the same problem
- Recurrence relation, a recursive formula for a sequence of numbers $a_n$
- Mathematical induction, a method of proof also called "proof by recursion"
- Recursion, a 2004 science fiction novel by Tony Ballantyne
- Recursion (Crouch novel), a 2019 science fiction novel by Blake Crouch
- Recursive science fiction, science fiction about science fiction

== See also ==
- Recursive function (disambiguation)
