= Teryl Rothery =

Canadian actress (born 1962)

- Rothery at Dragon Con in 2026
- Born: November 9, 1962 (age 64); Vancouver, British Columbia, Canada
- Occupation: Actress
- Years active: 1986–present
- Children: 1
- Website: www.terylrothery.com

Teryl Rothery (born November 9, 1962) is a Canadian actress. She is best known for portraying Dr. Janet Fraiser in the TV series Stargate SG-1. She co-starred as Grace Sherman in Cedar Cove, and has had major roles as Muriel in Virgin River, Jean Loring in Arrow and Celia Hudson in Nancy Drew. She has been involved in a number of television movies, particularly for Hallmark Entertainment.

== Career ==
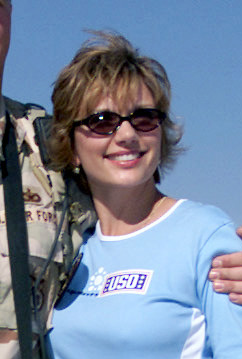
Rothery in Afghanistan (2001)

Rothery began dance lessons at age nine, and in 1995 looked upon that as the beginning of her career in entertainment. Her first professional outings as a performer were in the musical Bye Bye Birdie at age 13 and in the Marpole Community Theatre's production of The Sound of Music at age 14. As a youth, she danced on The Irish Rovers variety television series, and at age 18, she first appeared on television with a Canadian Broadcasting Corporation television special for Halloween. From ages 19–27, Rothery switched to radio, variously working and performing for CJAZ-FM, KISS-FM, and CKWX.

For her performance in A Delicate Balance, Rothery was nominated for a Jessie Richardson Theatre Award (2006–2007) in the category of "Outstanding Performance by an Actress in a Supporting Role, Small Theatre". In 2008, she was nominated for a Leo Award (in the category of "Best Performance by a Female in a Short Drama") for performing in Coffee Diva; she was nominated again in 2009 ("Best Supporting Performance by a Female in a Dramatic Series") for her work on The Guard. Two more Leo nominations were for acting in The Collector, and portraying Janet Fraiser in Stargate SG-1.

== Personal life ==
Rothery describes herself as a native of Vancouver, British Columbia, Canada, having been raised there by her grandparents. She has a daughter, Londyn, born in 2008.

Rothery was raised Catholic.

== Filmography ==
=== Live-action ===
==== Television ====
Year	Title	Role	Notes	Refs
1994	The X-Files	Michelle Charters	Episode: "Excelsis Dei"	
1996, 1997	The Outer Limits	Janet Preston; Dr. Lucy Cole	Episode: "Trial By Fire" "Re-Generation"	
1997–2006	Stargate SG-1	Janet Fraiser	seasons 1-7 recurring; season 9 guest	
2002	Jeremiah	Mary	Episode: "The Long Road"	
2004	Dead Like Me	Linda the Realtor	3 Episodes: "The Ledger", "Ghost Story" & "In Escrow"	
2004–2006	The Collector	Laura McKinney		
2006	Kyle XY	Carol Bloom	Recurring, 3 seasons	
2007, 2015	Supernatural	Medical examiner Olivette	Episode "Heart" "Paint it Black"	
2007	Babylon 5: The Lost Tales	ISN reporter Ms. Chambers	special anthology episodes	
2008–2011	The Guard	Gwen		
2008–2011	Caprica	Evelyn Adama	season 1 recurring	
2010–2011	Hellcats	Layne Monroe	9 episodes	
2012	The Killing	Kathy Travers	Episode: "Reflections" [S2/E1], AMC series	
2013–2015	Cedar Cove	Grace Sherman	main cast, 3 seasons	
2013	Arrow	Jean Loring	season 2 recurring, season 6 guest	
2015	iZombie	Mrs. Sparrow	Episode: "Maternity Liv"	
2015	Wayward Pines	Henrietta		
2016	Travelers	Patricia Holden		
2016	Good Witch	Meredith Mitchell	Episode special: "Secrets of Grey House"	
2017	Imposters	Barbara	Episode: "Cohen, Lenny Cohen"	
2017	Bates Motel	Beth	Episode: "Dreams Die First"	
2017–2022, 2024	The Good Doctor	JL / Dr. Jen Lancaster	seasons 1–5, 7 recurring	
2018	Chesapeake Shores	Robin O'Brien	season 3	
2019	Morning Show Mysteries	Hannah Kelso	Episode: "A Murder in Mind"	
2019–2021	Nancy Drew	Celia Hudson	seasons 1-2 recurring	
2019–present	Virgin River	Muriel St. Claire	Recurring	
2020	The Haunting of Bly Manor	Karen Clayton	Episode: "The Way It Came"	
2021	When Calls the Heart	Helen Bouchard	3 episodes	
2022	Upload	Dawn Kannerman	Season 2, Episode 7, "Download"	

==== Television films ====
Year	Title	Role	Notes	Refs
1992	Mortal Sins	Lena Falcone	USA Network movie	
1995	Deceived by Trust	Janet Harrison	NBC movie	
2002	Video Voyeur	Nancy Glover	Lifetime movie	
2004	The Book of Ruth	Aunt Syd	director Bill Eagles, TV movie	
2004	12 Days of Christmas Eve	Marilyn Carter	USA Network movie	
2010	Battle of the Bulbs	Mary Jones	Hallmark movie	
2011	A Fairly Odd Movie: Grow Up, Timmy Turner!	Timmy's mom	Nickelodeon original movie	
2012	The Wishing Tree	Chairperson Madelyn	Hallmark movie	
2016	Stop the Wedding	Suzie	Hallmark movie	
2017	All for Love	Diane Shaw	Hallmark movie	
2017	A Bramble House Christmas	Mable Bramble	Hallmark movie	
2017	Christmas Getaway	Marilyn	Hallmark movie	
2018	Aurora Teagarden Mysteries: The Disappearing Game	Carolyn Harrison	Hallmark Movies & Mysteries movie	
2018	Road to Christmas	Julia Wise	Hallmark movie	
2018	Santa's Boots	Elaine Monroe	Lifetime movie	
2019	Valentine in the Vineyard	Patricia	Hallmark movie	
2019	A Christmas Duet	Phyllis	Hallmark movie	
2019	Holiday Date	Donna	Hallmark movie	
2021	Sweet Carolina	Kate	Hallmark movie	
2021	Christmas with a Crown	Queen Mary	Lifetime movie	
2022	Francesca Quinn, PI	Megan Quinn	Hallmark Movies & Mysteries movie	
2023	A Christmas Hero	Fran		

==== Feature films ====
Year	Title	Role	Notes	Refs
1994	Andre	Jennifer Fife		
1995	Magic in the Water	Beth		
1997	Masterminds	Ms. Saunders		
2000	Best in Show	Philly AM Host		
2005	The Sandlot 2	Mrs. Goodfairer		
2007	Whisper	Ms. Sandborn		
2011	Diary of a Wimpy Kid: Rodrick Rules	Mrs. Kohan		

=== Voice acting ===
==== Anime ====
Year	Title	Role	Notes	Refs
1993–1998	Ranma ½	Kodachi Kuno	recurring, also OVAs	
1994	Project A-Ko OVAs	A-ko Magami	Ocean dub, starting from OVA2	
1995	Dragon Ball	Mai	Ocean dub, recurring	

==== Animation ====
Year	Title	Role	Notes	Refs
1998	Fat Dog Mendoza	Polly		
2000	D'Myna Leagues	Lucinda "Lefty" Lane, Herbal Poptop		
2003–2006	Martin Mystery	M.O.M, Octavia Paine (S3)	Main role	
2007	Totally Spies!	M.O.M.	Episode: "Totally Mystery Much?"	
2011–2015	The Little Prince	Thery's mother		
2018	Chip and Potato	Amanda, Ms. Gnash, Mrs. Dazzle, others		

==== Direct-to-video and television films ====
Year	Title	Role	Notes	Refs
1994	Ranma ½: Big Trouble in Nekonron China	Kodachi Kuno		
2000	Help! I'm a Fish	Lisa		
2002	Sabrina: Friends Forever	Miss Fetid		
2003	Polly Pocket: Lunar Eclipse	Ms. Marklin		
2003	G. I. Joe: Spy Troops	Baroness		
2004	My Scene: Masquerade Madness	Rachel, female model		
2004	G.I. Joe: Valor vs. Venom	Baroness, Granny		
2006	Barbie: Mermaidia	Pink Merfairy		
2006	PollyWorld	Ms. Marklin, Lizzie		
2013	Barbie in the Pink Shoes	Giselle's mom, Queen Vera		
2014	Barbie and the Secret Door	Queen of Zinnina		
