= Corrine Koslo =

Canadian actress

Corrine Koslo (born c. 1958 in France) is a Canadian actress. Primarily a stage actress most prominently associated with the Shaw Festival, she has also had supporting and voice roles in film and television.

A 1981 graduate of the Vancouver Playhouse's acting school, she has acted on stage throughout Canada. She is a two-time Dora Mavor Moore Award winner for her performances in Bunnicula and Seussical; a two-time Jessie Richardson Award winner for her performances in Love and Anger and Sweeney Todd; and an Elizabeth Sterling Haynes Award winner for her performance in Blithe Spirit.

Her appearances at the Shaw Festival have included productions of Drama at Inish, Cat on a Hot Tin Roof, Brief Encounters, The Entertainer, The Mystery of Edwin Drood, The Matchmaker, The Apple Cart, The Seagull, Hobson's Choice, Holiday, Tonight We Improvise, Come Back, Little Sheba, and Lady Windermere's Fan. She has also appeared in Vancouver Playhouse productions of William Shakespeare plays, including Much Ado About Nothing and Romeo and Juliet.

She appeared in minor supporting roles in the films Switching Channels, Ernest Goes to School, Hard Core Logo, Better Than Chocolate, and Best in Show. On television, she is best known for her role as Rachel Lynde in the 2017 version of Anne on Netflix, and has voiced characters in the animated series Beverly Hills Teens, Babar, and The New Adventures of Madeline. In 2017, it was announced that Koslo would voice the role of Emma in Corner Gas Animated, following the death of original Corner Gas performer Janet Wright.

== Filmography ==
=== Film ===
Year	Title	Role	Notes
1988	Switching Channels	Yvonne	
1994	Ernest Goes to School	Miss Flugal	
1996	Hard Core Logo	Laura Cromartie	
1999	Better Than Chocolate	Safe Sex Advocate	
2000	Best in Show	Mayflower Sporting Judge	

=== Television ===
Year	Title	Role	Notes
1987	Beverly Hills Teens	Nikki Darling	Recurring character
1988	Katts and Dog	Officer Connie Booth	7 episodes
1989-1991	Babar	Lady Rataxes	Voice, 65 episodes
1992-1993	Northwood	Theresa	10 episodes
1995	New Adventures of Madeline	Additional voices	
1995	The X-Files	Lottie Holloway	Episode: "Nisei"
1995	Mixed Blessings	The Nun	Television film
1998	Made in Canada	Stephanie	Episode: "A Death in the Family"
1998	Da Vinci's Inquest	Sylvia	Episode: "The Bridge"
1999	The Outer Limits	Abby	Episode: "The Inheritors"
2000	Life-Size	Toy store owner	Television film
2002	Cathy Jones Gets a Special	Herself/Various characters	Also writer
2002	The New Beachcombers	Cora Wrecht	TV movie
2006	Time Warp Trio	Lady Agnes Randolph	Voice, episode 26: "Plaid to the Bone"
2009	The Listener	Crown Attorney Fielder	Episode: "The 13th Juror / My Sister's Keeper"
2017-2019	Anne with an E	Rachel Lynde	23 episodes
2018	Schitt's Creek	Ricki	Episode: "Baby Sprinkle"
2018-2021	Corner Gas Animated	Emma Leroy	Main role (35 episodes)
2021-present	Moonshine	Bea Finley-Cullen	Main role
