= Dark Matter (Crouch novel) =

2016 novel by Blake Crouch

- First edition cover
- Author: Blake Crouch
- Cover artist: Christopher Brand
- Language: English
- Genres: Science fiction thriller
- Publisher: Crown Publishing Group
- Publication date: July 26, 2016
- Publication place: United States
- Media type: Hardback
- Pages: 342
- ISBN: 978-1-101-90422-0
- OCLC: 1004186724
- Dewey Decimal: 813/.6—dc23
- LC Class: 2015040107

Dark Matter is a thriller science fiction novel by American writer Blake Crouch, first published in the United States in July 2016 by the Crown Publishing Group. The story is about a physicist who is kidnapped and sent to a parallel universe in which another version of his life unfolds because of a different choice he made fifteen years prior. The book draws on the many-worlds interpretation of quantum mechanics which posits that every possible outcome of every event creates a new universe or world that runs parallel to our own.

Dark Matter received mixed reviews from critics, and was nominated for the 2016 World Technology Awards. A television adaptation, partially written by Crouch, premiered on May 8, 2024, as an Apple TV+ original.

== Plot summary ==
Jason Dessen, a former quantum mechanics physicist, is a college physics professor who lives in Chicago with his wife Daniela and their son Charlie. One day Jason is kidnapped and drugged. He wakes up in a science laboratory and stumbles out of a metal cube. He discovers that he is in an alternate Chicago where, fifteen years previously, he had decided not to marry Daniela and had pursued his career as a physicist instead. In this world he built the cube that enables the occupants to move between the countless worlds created from every possible outcome of every event.

Jason is held and questioned by scientists in the laboratory. They believe he is the Jason from this world, referred to as Jason2, and is the first person to successfully return from a journey in the cube. Jason learns that Jason2 was his abductor who came to Jason's world to see what his life would have been like had he abandoned his career and married Daniela. Jason2 sent Jason to Jason2's world so that Jason2 could pretend to be Daniela's husband.

Determined to return to his own Chicago and his wife and son, Jason and Amanda (Jason2's therapist), escape and enter the cube. Unfamiliar with its operation, they find themselves transported to a number of parallel worlds. Eventually, Jason reaches his own world, where he finds Jason2 living with his wife and son. He convinces Daniela and Charlie that he is the real Jason, and takes them into hiding to evade Jason2. Jason2 finds Jason and attempts to kill him, but Jason mortally wounds his rival. To avoid the other belligerent Jasons who were created each time Jason made a new decision in his travels through alternate worlds, he flees with his family to the cube to start a new life in another world.

== Background ==
In 2014 Crouch shared early ideas he had for Dark Matter with American author Marcus Sakey. Crouch and Sakey often had brainstorming sessions where they discussed new books they were writing. Crouch said after working with Sakey for several days, "the shape of this book come out of the fog". Crouch's decision to set Dark Matter in Chicago came "partly out of sentimentality but also because of the landmarks of Chicago, the skyline, the lake . . . there's just something about it that spoke to me". Regarding the book's title, Crouch explained that life is full of mysteries, but that there are many more beneath the surface that we cannot see, just as the dark matter in the universe is hidden from view.

Crouch's interest in quantum mechanics began when he read an article on it in Scientific American. His fascination in the subject grew further when experimental quantum physicist Aaron D. O'Connell demonstrated that subatomic particles exist in quantum superposition. This led Crouch to ask himself, if microscopic particles occupy multiple realities, why not everyday objects, including people? What if a device could be built that allowed a person to exist in superposition? Crouch said Dark Matter is about "the nature of reality and of identity, and of questioning whether or not to trust what we see before our eyes."

== Publication ==
=== Reception ===
In a review in The Guardian, Alison Flood described Dark Matter as one of "the most helter-skelter, race-to-the-finish-line thriller you'll read all year". She stated that it is "not ... a sensible book", but "[i]t is proud and joyful in its absurdity". Flood said Crouch's "path-not-taken fantasy is intriguing", and Jason's devotion to his wife and son is "touching, and charming".

Andrew O’Hehir wrote in a review of the novel in The New York Times that it is a mix of several genres: alternate-universe science fiction, a countdown thriller, and a fantasy not unlike C. S. Lewis's Chronicles of Narnia and Lev Grossman's Magicians books. He said that notwithstanding the inclusion of "pop physics", Dark Matter is a book you can read in one sitting, and one which "barely qualifies as beach reading". O’Hehir complained that its frantic pace leaves little room for character development and opportunities for readers to critically examine what it is they are reading. He also felt that Crouch's "need for speed" impacts his "better writing", and concluded, "I'd have appreciated more expansiveness and more relish."

Reviewing the book for USA Today, Brian Truitt called Dark Matter "a nightmarish quantum-mechanics version of It's a Wonderful Life". He said the book's science is "thought-provoking", even if some of it appears to be "a bit too convenient" in places. Truitt stated that the minor characters receive little to no characterization, but found Jason's "mind-set" well explored. Truitt summed up that Dark Matter is "a hard tale to shake once finished". Peter Heck in Asimov's Science Fiction also thought that some of the plot elements were "a bit too convenient ... to be entirely plausible", but added that this comes with the territory in "action-orientated fiction". Heck called Dark Matter a "good, fast-paced read" by "a writer without extensive genre credits taking a classic SF trope and making something fresh out of it."

Writing at The Verge, Andrew Liptak said that in Dark Matter Crouch uses science fiction's familiar theme of multiple realities to explore identity. The book's collection of different Jasons raises the question, "which is the real one?", but Liptak felt that it never really develops them enough to make them memorable. Some of the minor characters like Daniela and Charlie also felt underdeveloped and evoked little empathy. Liptak said that while Dark Matter is "the equivalent of a science fiction beach read", and Crouch "never lets up on the breakneck pace", it is a "fun ride".

Several reviewers criticized Crouch's use of short single-sentence paragraphs. Flood said that Dark Matter is "madly fast-moving", and this is accentuated by his "not un-irritating habit of breaking his narrative up into single-line paragraphs". O’Hehir wrote that the book's profusion of "one-word sentences, one-sentence paragraphs and dramatic oceans of white space" is a ploy Crouch uses to hold the reader's attention. Jason Sheehan at National Public Radio called Crouch's "maddening addiction to sentence fragments and single line paragraphs ... annoying at first, then infuriating, then simply numbing."

Literary scholar Sara Martín argued the novel rejects the idea that a workaholic male genius must also be a terrible family man. Instead, Crouch uses science fiction to endorse a positive masculine model in which the male genius is allowed to work and care for women and children.

=== Translations ===
The book was translated into Dutch by Corry van Bree as Dark Matter and published by Karakter in August 2016. It was also translated into German by Klaus Berr as Dark Matter: Der Zeitenläufer and published by Goldmann in March 2017.

== Adaptation ==
In November 2014, Sony Pictures made a pre-emptive bid of $1.25 million for Dark Matter. The bid was based on Crouch's incomplete 150-page manuscript at the time. In December 2020, it was announced that a TV series based on Dark Matter would be co-produced by Apple Studios and Sony Pictures Television. Crouch would adapt the script and the series would be produced by Matt Tolmach and David Manpearl, with Crouch as executive producer. The adaptation was originally intended to be a feature film, but it was dropped in favor of a TV series.

In March 2022, Apple TV+ ordered a nine-episode TV series with Joel Edgerton playing the part of Jason Dessen. Edgerton was also the show's executive producer, while the book's author, Crouch served as writer for the pilot episode and also showrunner for Sony Pictures Television and Apple Studios. It premiered on May 8, 2024.
