= Dark Matter (2024 TV series) =

American science fiction television series

- Genre: Science fiction; Drama; Thriller
- Created by: Blake Crouch
- Based on: Dark Matter by Blake Crouch
- Showrunner: Blake Crouch
- Starring: Joel Edgerton; Jennifer Connelly; Alice Braga; Jimmi Simpson; Dayo Okeniyi; Oakes Fegley; Amanda Brugel
- Music by: Jason Hill; Mac Quayle
- Country of origin: United States
- Original language: English
- No. of seasons: 2
- No. of episodes: 19

Production
- Executive producers: Blake Crouch; Joel Edgerton; Jakob Verbruggen; Don Kurt; David Manpearl; Matt Tolmach; Jennifer Connelly; Jacquelyn Ben-Zekry; Richard Lederer
- Producers: Dustin Bernard; Jeff MacVittie; Jake Brown; Camilla Grove
- Cinematography: John Lindley; Jeffrey Greeley
- Running time: 46–65 minutes
- Production companies: Matt Tolmach Productions; Mountainside Entertainment; Sony Pictures Television

Original release
- Network: Apple TV+
- Release: May 8 – June 26, 2024
- Network: Apple TV
- Release: August 28, 2026 – present

Dark Matter is an American science fiction television series created by Blake Crouch, based on his 2016 novel. The series premiered on Apple TV+ on May 8, 2024. In August 2024, the series was renewed for a second season, which premiered on August 28, 2026.

== Premise ==
A physicist in Chicago is kidnapped into an alternate version of his life, leaving him to fight to return to his life to prevent the alternate version of himself from taking over his family.

== Cast and characters ==
=== Main ===
- Joel Edgerton as Jason Dessen, a physicist who unwillingly travels between alternate realities after being abducted by his counterpart (Jason2)
- Jennifer Connelly as Daniela Dessen, Jason's wife
- Alice Braga as Amanda Lucas, Jason2's girlfriend and partner who tries to help Jason1 find his way back home
- Jimmi Simpson as Ryan Holder, Jason's closest friend
- Dayo Okeniyi as Leighton Vance, the CEO of Velocity Labs
- Oakes Fegley as Charlie Dessen, Jason and Daniela's son. Fegley also portrays Charlie's twin brother, Max Dessen, in the second season.
- Amanda Brugel as Blair Caplan (season 2; recurring season 1), a physicist working for Velocity Labs

=== Recurring ===
- Aina Brei-Yon as Dawn Lawrence (season 1)
- William Smillie as Matt
- Chris Diamantopoulos as Mitchel MacNamara (season 2)
- Adrienne Lewis as Sandra (season 2)
- Kevin Chacón as Eduardo (season 2)

=== Guest ===
- Jenne Kang as Dr. Julianne Springer
- Kate Eastman as Detective Jamie Mason
- Patricia Mario as Silvia (season 1)
- Dani Deetté as Annie (season 1)
- Kirsten Fitzgerald as Mrs. Bumgarner (season 2)
- Rebecca Spence as Sheila MacNamara (season 2)
- Mykelti Williamson as Grandpa Vance (season 2)
- Michelle Duffy as Dr. Bennett (season 2)
- Angela Sarafyan as Maria (season 2)
- Linda Bove as Ellie Dessen (season 2)
- Gil Birmingham as Gabriel Vargas (season 2)
- Margo Martindale as Laurel (season 2)

== Episodes ==
Season	Episodes	Originally released		
Season	Episodes	First released	Last released	Network
1	9	May 8, 2024	June 26, 2024	Apple TV+
2	10	August 28, 2026	October 30, 2026	Apple TV

=== Season 1 (2024) ===
No. overall	No. in season	Title	Directed by	Teleplay by	Original release date
1	1	"Are You Happy in Your Life?"	Jakob Verbruggen	Blake Crouch	May 8, 2024
Jason Dessen, a college physics professor, lives in Chicago with his wife Daniela and son Charlie. Jason attends a celebration at a local bar (the Village Tap) to celebrate his friend Ryan winning the prestigious Pavia prize. As he is walking home, he is held at gunpoint and abducted by a masked man who takes him to a building site, forcing him to remove his clothes and surrender his phone, before drugging him. As Jason falls unconscious, the masked man asks him if he is happy with his life, and if he ever thought about other lives he could have lived, to which Jason says 'yes'. When he wakes, Jason finds himself in a laboratory facility (Velocity Labs) where he meets psychiatrist Amanda Lucas and Velocity CEO Leighton Vance — whom he recognizes — both of whom are delighted that he has "returned". Uncertain and disoriented, Jason escapes the lab and returns home, where he again meets Amanda, who tells him they live together. The interior décor of the house is noticeably different, and there is no sign of Daniela or Charlie. Jason's abductor is revealed to be another version of himself (Jason2), who enters Jason1's house and seduces Daniela.
2	2	"Trip of a Lifetime"	Jakob Verbruggen	Blake Crouch	May 8, 2024
The Velocity team scrambles to find Jason1 while he checks himself into a hospital. There he learns he is a world-renowned physicist who has not been seen in public for over a year, and there is a psychoactive compound in his system. Escaping possible commital, he manages to track down Daniela — now a successful artist — at her latest exhibition. When Jason, Ryan, and Daniela talk after the show at Daniela's house, she tells Jason1 that he (in fact, Jason2) approached her before his disappearance and confided his regrets regarding ending their relationship long ago and the possibility that she would never see him again. Despite being puzzled and concerned, unlike Ryan who did not believe Jason's explanations, Daniela agrees to help Jason1 resolve the discrepancies he has identified in his life and environment. He realizes the paths between the Jasons diverged when Daniela became pregnant, when Jason1 decided to stay and Jason2 decided to leave. Meanwhile, despite initially struggling, Jason2 settles into his blissful life with Daniela and Charlie. Dawn (Velocity security) breaks into Daniela's condo, kills her, and captures Jason1.
3	3	"The Box"	Jakob Verbruggen	Blake Crouch	May 15, 2024
Jason1 agrees to work with Velocity, claiming he wants to regain his memories. He studies Jason2's research and realizes he discovered a means to travel between dimensions, from a version of reality to another, by sealing the traveller inside a metal box, injecting them with a chemical compound to inhibit areas of the prefrontal cortex and induce a state of superposition. Jason2 becomes uneasy about Ryan's presence at his house in Jason1's world. Jason1 tries to procure more information about Jason2's research from Ryan in Jason2's world. Jason1 is discovered as an imposter by Leighton, who tries to force the truth out of him, and Ryan from Jason2's world is implied to be killed. Amanda breaks Jason1 out of confinement, hoping to return him to his own world, but when they are discovered, they both enter Jason2's box intending to flee, injuring Dawn's hand in the process. Inside it, they inject the chemical compound and appear in a corridor filled with doors. In Jason1's world, Daniela notices a change in Jason2's personality.
4	4	"The Corridor"	Celine Held & Logan George	Blake Crouch	May 22, 2024
Jason1 and Amanda find themselves in an infinite corridor with doors leading to an infinite number of alternate realities, unknowingly followed by Leighton. They use the ampoules and explore numerous doors hoping to find Jason1's reality, but every world they visit happens to be desolate and ruined. They find themselves in a frozen Chicago. After Jason1 rescued Amanda from a blizzard, they both realise that the doors respond to their mental state when opening them. In Jason1's world, Jason2 quits his job and approaches Leighton, hoping to procure funding. After Jason2 previews the box's capabilities and explains its function to him, Leighton agrees to pay him a lot of money in return for providing the ampoules. Daniela and Charlie discuss Jason's (in fact, Jason2's) change in demeanour after he missed their late son's memorial service, while Jason1 and Amanda bond inside the box, and an injured Leighton from Jason2's world emerges into a devastated world.
5	5	"Worldless"	Celine Held & Logan George	Megan McDonnell	May 29, 2024
Jason1 and Amanda find a world in which a lab employee, Blair, from Jason2/Amanda's world, resides. Despite living in a dangerous world, Blair does not want to risk returning to the box until she is ready, believing it is nearly impossible to navigate the corridor. She also cautions Amanda to figure out her own path forward while aiding Jason1 in his quest. Despite trying to stay calm and focused when opening the doors, Jason1 and Amanda keep finding themselves in uninhabitable worlds. They visit a world gripped by plague, where Charlie died and Daniela is dying, and another world in which Jason is an incarcerated criminal. When Jason1 visits 'his' home, Daniela calls the police, and he is assaulted by Charlie. In Jason1's world, Jason2 tells Daniela that he quit his job and encourages her to do the same. She begins to feel left out of their marriage. To secure Leighton's funding, Jason2 visits his own world to procure more ampoules, learns in the process that Jason1 and Amanda escaped Jason2's world via the box, and says he intends to seal up the box for anyone to enter Jason1's world.
6	6	"Superposition"	Roxann Dawson	Megan McDonnell	June 5, 2024
At Jason2's behest, Daniela begins painting again. Jason2 feeds Charlie ice cream with nuts, unaware that he has an allergy. In the emergency room, Daniela notices needle marks on Jason2's arm and later confides in Blair, who suggests Daniela should follow him. After Jason2 embarrasses her by displaying her unfinished painting at a charity auction, she overcomes her initial reluctance and follows him to his storage unit — finding the ampoules — and enlists Ryan's help in analysing the compound within. Jason1 attempts to write a description of his world to focus his mind in an effort to better the chances of finding his reality, but he and Amanda still find themselves visiting worlds similar but not identical to his own. Exhausted, they take time to rest and explore their surroundings. Meanwhile, Jason2 meets Jason1's world's Amanda for a therapy session. Ryan confronts Jason2, believing that he stole his research, as he had already synthesized the compound Daniela provided from Jason2's storage unit. After discussing their compounds' applications, Jason2 takes Ryan to an alternate, more progressive Chicago, via the box, and strands him there. Jason2 then returns to Jason1's world and encloses the box with concrete.
7	7	"In the Fires of Dead Stars"	Roxann Dawson	Blake Crouch & Jacquelyn Ben-Zekry	June 12, 2024
Daniela becomes suspicious of Jason2. A detective visits the Dessen household to inquire about Ryan, who was reported missing by his girlfriend. Ryan was last seen with Jason2 before his disappearance. Daniela confronts Jason2 about the drug and, to appease her, he confesses to its purpose, but does not mention Ryan, Jason1, or the box. He then reopens the box and uses it to replace Ryan with another from a different world. Meanwhile, on Amanda's recommendation, she and Jason1 visit a more progressive Chicago for rest and recuperation. Amanda claims that to choose the world, she did not think about people, but of ideas and concepts that might make a world worth experiencing. After exploring for a while, Amanda decides to stay. She invites Jason1 to do the same, he declines, wanting to get back to his own world. They share a kiss before heading their separate ways. Jason1 finally succeeds in returning to his own reality using his last ampoule. Before confronting Jason2, Jason1 visits a store to buy protection gear. He is told by the store salesperson that someone exactly like him, but without the finger splint, left the store 20 seconds before he came in.
8	8	"Jupiter"	Alik Sakharov	Ihuoma Ofordire and Megan McDonnell	June 19, 2024
Another Jason attacks Jason2, who kills him. Daniela visits Ryan, who claims to be her mechanic. When asked where his memory ends, he mentions having drinks with a man Daniela is able to confirm is Jason. From his hotel, Jason1 is spotted and followed by another Jason. When he enters the Village Tap to lose him, he meets another Jason (Jason13) there. Every decision Jason1 made while inside the box created another Jason; those who made the right choices ended up back in his world. Jason13 eventually leaves, warning Jason1 not to interfere with the reunion with his family. Jason2 takes Charlie for a tour of the University of Chicago, and notices another Jason following them. He sends Charlie away and dispatches the other Jason. Jason1 allows himself to be arrested for smoking inside a restaurant, to be alone with Daniela. She comes to accept his account and promises to meet him later with Charlie using the code word "Jupiter". After incapacitating Jason2, Daniela and Charlie flee the house, and two other Jasons along the way, reuniting with Jason1.
9	9	"Entanglement"	Alik Sakharov	Blake Crouch & Jacquelyn Ben-Zekry	June 26, 2024
The Dessens take refuge at the holiday home of one of Charlie's friends. Jason1 finds an online forum in which Jasons who have arrived in his world are attempting to decide which of them will stay with Daniela and Charlie. Daniela sends a message indicating that she chooses Jason1. At the Dessen residence, Jason13 restrains Jason2 and lures Blair in order to find the Dessens. When Jason13 tries to force her to comply, she overpowers him and finds out the truth. Jason2 arrives at the Dessens' hideout as several Jasons confront each other; he saves Jason1 and helps the Dessens escape. They discover that Jason2 left a box of ampoules and an audio recording in the car, in which he apologizes for his actions. Realizing that they are no longer safe, the Dessens arrive at the box's location, which is crowded with Jasons who eventually decide to let them go. The Dessens choose a doorway while Leighton from Jason1's world enters the box and injects an ampoule. Blair2 leaves the world in which she met Jason1 and Amanda; in the progressive world, Amanda is approached by Ryan, who appears to have been trying to recreate the box drug.

=== Season 2 (2026) ===
No. overall	No. in season	Title	Directed by	Written by	Original release date
10	1	"A Quiet Life"	Gwyneth Horder-Payton	Blake Crouch & Jacquelyn Ben-Zekry	August 28, 2026
In the original universe, agent Mitchel MacNamara interrogates Jason13, who believes the Jasons are part of a cloning cell. Under threat of dissection, Jason13 offers to help MacNamara find Jason2. Seven months after the Dessens have settled into a new reality, Daniela is surprised at home by another Jason and shoots him. While Jason1 is digging a grave, a sheriff's deputy arrives with the dead Jason's notebook. After the officer notices the body, Daniela distracts him, and they escape, picking up Charlie and driving back to the box. In their search for a new universe, Jason1 vows to destroy the box. In the progressive world, Ryan1 notices Amanda and her ampoule necklace. She explains that there are multiple Jasons and that the one who kidnapped him is from her world. Ryan1 then starts working to recreate the compound. The box is deemed public art and relocated to Millennium Park, complicating Ryan1 and Amanda's plans. In another reality, Leighton has formed a cult-like following. Another version of Leighton is found by Leighton2, who recruits him to help harness the box's power.
11	2	"A Perfect World"	Gwyneth Horder-Payton	Blake Crouch & Jacquelyn Ben-Zekry	September 4, 2026
In a flashback to the day Velocity Labs first activated the box, Leighton presents it as a way to improve humanity by importing breakthroughs from more advanced realities, while Amanda worries about the psychological dangers of entering it. In the present, Jason1, Daniela, and Charlie search for a new home. They discover a world where modern technology does not exist, making it ideal for disappearing. While Daniela deals with the trauma of having killed another Jason, Charlie is enrolled in a new school. Jason1 hires an alternate MacNamara to create fake identities for them, but MacNamara becomes suspicious after learning that two Dessen families exist in his reality, and discovers the box. Ryan1 recreates a version of the drug needed to navigate the box. Amanda decides to accompany him, and they leave the progressive world. They arrive in the same world as Jason1, though they narrowly miss one another. Leighton2 coordinates with other Leightons to exchange technology and knowledge between universes.
12	3	"Everything Beautiful, Everything Terrible"	Charlotte Sieling	Jacquelyn Ben-Zekry & Blake Crouch	September 11, 2026
In a flashback to three years prior, Jason2 questions his former professors about the consequences of opening access to infinite realities and is warned that such a discovery would inevitably produce both extraordinary benefits and terrible consequences. In the present, Jason, Daniela, and Charlie have spent months establishing a life in the technologically less advanced Chicago, while MacNamara continues investigating them and Velocity-Tech's suspicious technological advances. Charlie adjusts to his new world and prepares for prom, while Daniela unexpectedly encounters Blair. Jason, supposedly preparing to destroy the box, instead becomes fascinated by its technology and secretly dismantles and studies it. Daniela confronts him after he misses Charlie's prom send-off, warning that he is repeating Jason2's choice of scientific ambition over family. Meanwhile, Leighton uses interdimensional travel to bring a vaccine and treatment to a pandemic-stricken reality. Amanda and Ryan discover that the box can be navigated by concentrating on a specific person, leading them to another Ryan and Jason2. When MacNamara's agents close in, the group escapes through the box. Jason finally chooses his family and completely dismantles the box, but when he returns to dispose of its components, he discovers that the box has mysteriously reappeared. At the same time, Leighton arrives in the Dessens' world.
13	4	"Stars, Hide Your Fires"	Charlotte Sieling	Jacquelyn Ben-Zekry & Blake Crouch	September 18, 2026
Leighton emerges from the box into Jason1's original world, where MacNamara and his agents are waiting, but quickly retreats and instead arrives in the low-tech Chicago where Jason, Daniela, and Charlie have settled. After apologizing to Jason, Leighton leaves. Jason considers moving the family again, but Charlie refuses to abandon the life he has built. Meanwhile, Jason2, Amanda, and Ryan return the displaced Ryan to his own reality. Jason2 apologizes to Amanda for his past actions and, after being given several doses of the box drug, departs alone to try to do something worthwhile. Amanda and Ryan return to the seemingly utopian world they previously visited, only to discover it is under quarantine and curfew; authorities recognize them, scan them, and take them into custody. Back in low-tech Chicago, Jason and Daniela continue struggling with trauma, frequently imagining alternate versions of Jason around them. Charlie begins working and eventually leaves for college, leaving his parents alone. Jason becomes absorbed in solving the box's entanglement equations in hopes of permanently disconnecting their world from other realities, while Daniela grows increasingly unsettled. Unable to process everything she has endured, Daniela tells Jason she needs to leave temporarily to rediscover herself, though they reaffirm their love before separating.
14	5	"Love and Be Loved"	Alik Sakharov	Blake Crouch & Jacquelyn Ben-Zekry	September 25, 2026
One of the alternate Jasons left behind after Jason, Daniela, and Charlie escaped their original world contemplates suicide but instead enters the box, searching for a place where he can "love and be loved". He finds a reality where his mother, Ellie, is still alive but where that world's Jason died at sixteen. After overcoming her initial shock, Ellie accepts him, and Jason gradually begins rebuilding his life. He later encounters two other displaced versions of himself, who also become part of their unusual family. Over the following years, Jason takes up woodworking and builds a successful furniture business while caring for Ellie as she develops cancer. He eventually meets Maria, a bookstore owner, and begins a relationship with her, revealing the truth about his origins and showing her the box. Ellie eventually dies, with the three Jasons caring for her through her final days. Maria later reconciles with Jason, and they build a life together. When Jason unexpectedly encounters this world's Daniela, she is merely a stranger because her Jason died before they ever met. Rather than reigniting his longing for his former family, the encounter confirms that he has moved on. Jason finally removes the makeshift wedding ring linking him to Daniela and embraces his new life with Maria.
15	6	"What the Universe Is Made Of"	Amit Gupta	Jacquelyn Ben-Zekry & Blake Crouch	October 2, 2026
Daniela retreats to her family's remote cabin, where she reconnects with her stepfather, Gabriel Vargas, who senses that she is struggling. Their reunion becomes complicated when Gabriel receives a call from the Daniela native to this low-tech world, forcing her to begin explaining the box and the multiverse. Meanwhile, Jason1 encounters this low-tech world's Amanda, whose life took a very different path, and her encouragement rekindles his scientific ambitions. He begins developing a theory that people who have interacted with the box may remain connected through a form of quantum entanglement. Jason1 also reunites with Blair, who reveals that she is the same Blair who traveled through the box in their original world. Blair takes Jason1 to a scientific gala, where he embraces his desire to pursue serious research. There, Blair encounters Leighton, who has secretly spent years introducing advanced technology into this low-tech reality. He later takes her through abandoned underground tunnels to an enormous facility containing a mysterious new pyramid-like structure related to his larger multiversal project. Charlie, increasingly dissatisfied with his life, becomes fascinated when Jason1 tells him about an alternate Max who survived childhood. Hoping to find his brother, Charlie secretly takes the box drug and enters the box alone.
16	7	"The Pyramid"	Amit Gupta	Blake Crouch & Jacquelyn Ben-Zekry	October 9, 2026
In the progressive world, Ryan and Amanda are scanned for a deadly virus and learn that another version of them brought the virus there. This world's Leighton helps them escape so they can find a cure, but Amanda is hit by a tranquilizer dart while entering the box. Daniela explains everything to her stepfather and learns from Eduardo that Charlie has gone looking for Max. After escaping a dangerous world, Charlie ends up inside the house of a woman named Laurel, which several versions of Jason, Amanda and Ryan have already visited. Mitchel MacNamara's sister Sheila asks him to investigate the Dessen family, suspecting ties to Leighton's company, which threatens their family business. Leighton shows Blair the pyramid and reveals power supply problems. She meets that low-tech world's Ryan and her own world's Jason (i.e. Jason2) but declines Leighton's invitation to join them. The other Leighton decides to monitor her. When Jason1 is confronted by MacNamara about the box, he mixes the box drug into his drink and takes him to the box, locking him inside and leaving him to his own fate. Daniela waits for Jason1 at his apartment but, when he fails to appear, leaves him a letter. Jason1 returns home without noticing it and is visited by Jason2.
17	8	"The Basic Oneness of Everything"	Guillermo Navarro	Blake Crouch & Jacquelyn Ben-Zekry	October 16, 2026
18	9	"How to Build the Box"	Nick Murphy	Jacquelyn Ben-Zekry & Blake Crouch	October 23, 2026
19	10	"No Quiet Life"	Nick Murphy	Blake Crouch & Jacquelyn Ben-Zekry	October 30, 2026

== Production ==
It was first announced in December 2020 that Apple TV+ had entered into development of a series adaptation of Blake Crouch's novel, with Crouch set to act as showrunner and head writer. The series was officially greenlit in March 2022, with Apple ordering 9 episodes and Joel Edgerton cast to star. Louis Leterrier was set to direct the first four episodes. By September 2022, Jennifer Connelly, Alice Braga, Jimmi Simpson, Oakes Fegley and Dayo Okeniyi joined the cast. In December, Amanda Brugel joined the cast in a recurring role.

Filming primarily took place in Chicago, Illinois, beginning in October 2022 and lasting six months. Locations included Cinespace Chicago Film Studios, Downtown Chicago, Millennium Park, Lake Shore Drive, Montrose Harbor, Logan Square, taverns in Roscoe Village and West Town, the Art Institute of Chicago, the Regenstein and Mansueto libraries at the University of Chicago, and an abandoned hospital in Blue Island.

In August 2024, the series was renewed for a second season.

If greenlit, Season 3 is intended to be the final season, according to producer Ben-Zekry. In an October 2026 interview with TheWrap, Blake Crouch confirmed that he conceptualised the show as a three-season story from the beginning.

== Release ==
The first season premiered on Apple TV+ with two episodes on May 8, 2024, followed by seven more episodes released weekly. The second season premiered on August 28, 2026.

== Reception ==
For the first season, the review aggregator website Rotten Tomatoes reported an 81% approval rating with an average rating of 6.9/10, based on 59 critic reviews. The website's critics consensus reads, "Dark Matter's intriguing ideas are spread a tad thin over its season-long runtime, but fans of foreboding sci-fi will find its residue addictively sticky." Metacritic, which uses a weighted average, the first season was assigned a score of 64 out of 100 based on 22 critics, indicating "generally favorable reviews".

For the second season, the review aggregator website Rotten Tomatoes reported an 81% approval rating with an average rating of 7.4/10, based on 27 critic reviews. The website's critics consensus reads, "Dark Matter expands its worlds through illuminating central performances, thought-provoking storytelling, and attentive care for the science fiction genre and all its creative possibilities." Metacritic, which uses a weighted average, the second season was assigned a score of 76 out of 100 based on 8 critics, indicating "generally favorable reviews".
