= Moonshine (Canadian TV series) =

Canadian television drama series

- Also known as: Feudal (working title)
- Genre: Drama
- Created by: Sheri Elwood
- Starring: Jennifer Finnigan; Anastasia Phillips; Emma Hunter; Tom Stevens; Alexander Nunez; Erin Darke; Farid Yazdani; James Gilbert; Allegra Fulton; Corrine Koslo; Peter MacNeill; Celia Owen; Calem MacDonald; Leigh-Ann Rose; J.D. Martin
- Country of origin: Canada
- No. of seasons: 3
- No. of episodes: 24

Production
- Executive producers: Jocelyn Hamilton; Charles Bishop; Sheri Elwood
- Running time: 60 minutes
- Production companies: Six Eleven Media; Entertainment One

Original release
- Network: CBC
- Release: September 14, 2021 – September 3, 2023

Moonshine is a Canadian drama television series, which premiered on September 14, 2021, on CBC Television. The series stars Jennifer Finnigan as Lidia Bennett, daughter of Ken and Bea Finley-Cullen played by Peter MacNeill and Corrine Koslo, the owners of a ramshackle summer resort on the south shore of Nova Scotia who are keen to retire but whose adult children are battling for control.

== Cast and characters ==
=== Main ===
- Jennifer Finnigan as Lidia Bennett: an architect and the eldest Finley-Cullen sibling who wants to redevelop and exploit the Moonshine
- Anastasia Phillips as Rhian Finley-Cullen: Lidia's often-overlooked younger sister who sees The Moonshine as her own chance to shine
- Emma Hunter as Nora Finley-Cullen: Lidia's sister and a host at the local radio station who knows all the family secrets
- Tom Stevens as Ryan Finley-Cullen: Rhian’s twin, who is running his own marijuana business out of the resort
- Alexander Nunez as Sammy Finley-Cullen: Lidia's musically gifted adopted brother who holds secrets of his own
- Erin Darke as Crystal LeBlanc: Ryan's supportive girlfriend who has something to prove to herself
- Farid Yazdani as Oscar Finley-Cullen: a police officer trying to shut down the Moonshine who goes undercover as a guest
- James Gilbert as Terry Gallagher: Rhian's cop husband who is having an affair with her sister Nora
- Allegra Fulton as Jill LeBlanc: an old family friend with some nefarious motives and secrets of her own
- Corrine Koslo as Bea Finley-Cullen: Ken's wife and the matriarch of the Finley-Cullen family and co-owner of the Moonshine with secrets to hide
- Peter MacNeill as Ken Finley-Cullen: Bea's husband and the patriarch of the Finley-Cullen family and co-owner of the Moonshine, trying to decide who should take over the Moonshine from him and Bea
- Celia Owen as Eleanor Bennett (seasons 2–3; recurring season 1): Lidia's annoyed and environmentally-friendly daughter who dislikes staying at the Moonshine
- Calem MacDonald as Finn Bennett (seasons 2–3; recurring season 1): Lidia's son who struggles with his sexual identity at the Moonshine
- Leigh-Ann Rose as Aunjanue Arnold (seasons 2–3): Sammy's biological mother who worked at the Moonshine in her teen years
- J.D. Martin as Weston Lonergan (season 3)

=== Recurring ===
- Jonathan Silverman as Daniel Bennett: Lidia’s husband and a star architect, suffering through his own mid-life crisis
- Stephen Lawrence as Bruce Barrington: a musician living in Foxton
- T. Thomason as Michael Hurson (season 1): Finn and Eleanor's love interest
- Loretta Yu as Moira Lancaster (season 1): a cop working with Oscar/Colin who worries when he begins to fail at his job
- Allan Hawco as Gale Favreau (seasons 2–3; guest season 1): Lidia's biker love interest who ropes Lidia into his dangerous occupation
- Shelley Thompson as Felicia Finley-Cullen (season 2): Lidia's late aunt who favors her and leaves 43 percent of the Moonshine to her when she passed

== Episodes ==
Season	Episodes	Originally released	
Season	Episodes	First released	Last released
1	8	September 14, 2021	November 2, 2021
2	8	October 2, 2022	November 20, 2022
3	8	July 16, 2023	September 3, 2023

=== Season 1 (2021) ===
No. overall	No. in season	Title	Directed by	Written by	Original release date
1	1	"Standby Out of Newark"	Scott Smith	Sheri Elwood	September 14, 2021
Lidia Bennett returns home from New York to her family's Moonshine resort in Nova Scotia for her aunt's funeral. Unfortunately, her marriage implodes, her kids turn on her, and a surprise inheritance kicks off a family feud with her sister, Rhian. Instead of giving up and leaving, Lidia doubles down. She's going to stay and she's going to make her new life work or die trying.
2	2	"Escape Goat"	James Genn	Sheri Elwood	September 21, 2021
Lidia takes the reins on an annual Moonshine event called the Goat Roast, with motives insisting on glampy upgrades and a fancy new name, while Rhian declares war. Meanwhile, Crystal talks to Ryan about a possible future away from Moonshine and the mushroom crop.
3	3	"There is No I in Denial"	Scott Smith	Matt MacLennan	September 28, 2021
In Lidia's attempt to transform Moonshine, Bea learns that Lidia has been going through Felicia's personal property, including information which Bea will go to extreme lengths to keep hidden. Meanwhile, Rhian has turned from being aggressive to scary and dangerous following the goat roast turned fiasco.
4	4	"Zen and the Art of Midlife Maintenance"	James Genn	Kate Spurgeon	October 5, 2021
5	5	"Love Will Tear Us Apart"	Scott Smith	Josh Saltzman	October 12, 2021
6	6	"Blueberry Season"	Scott Smith	Kate Spurgeon & Josh Saltzman	October 19, 2021
7	7	"Who Is the Dead Guy?"	Sheri Elwood	Matt MacLennan	October 26, 2021
8	8	"So Long, Farewell, You're Staying"	Sheri Elwood	Sheri Elwood	November 2, 2021

=== Season 2 (2022) ===
No. overall	No. in season	Title	Directed by	Written by	Original release date
9	1	"The Three Sisters of Fate"	Sheri Elwood	Sheri Elwood	October 2, 2022
10	2	"Moose Knuckle & The Golden Clam"	Sheri Elwood	Kate Spurgeon & Robina Lord-Stafford	October 9, 2022
11	3	"Bitches, I've Now Gone Outlaw"	Scott Smith	Matt MacLennan	October 16, 2022
12	4	"Call of the Kraken"	Simonee Chichester	Kate Spurgeon & Josh Saltzman	October 23, 2022
13	5	"The Dinnervention"	Sara St. Onge	Story by : Matt MacLennan & Angelica Mendizabal; Teleplay by : Angelica Mendizabal	October 30, 2022
14	6	"Mommy Issues"	Sara St. Onge	Sheri Elwood & Moira Stevenson	November 6, 2022
15	7	"44.6304N 64.0515W"	Scott Smith	Josh Saltzman & Robina Lord-Stafford	November 13, 2022
16	8	"How to Slander a Finley-Cullen or Die Trying"	Scott Smith	Sheri Elwood & Moira Stevenson	November 20, 2022

=== Season 3 (2023) ===
No. overall	No. in season	Title	Directed by	Written by	Original release date
17	1	"You Try Reinventing Your Life in Your Forties Fuckers"	Scott Smith	Sheri Elwood	July 16, 2023
18	2	"It's a Vulva, Son"	Scott Smith	Kate Spurgeon	July 23, 2023
19	3	"Sunk the Junk"	Shamim Sarif	Meredith Vuchnich & Alexander Nunez	July 30, 2023
20	4	"I Am the Night!"	Shamim Sarif	Josh Saltzman	August 6, 2023
21	5	"How to Lose Friends and Shit-Can Your Reputation"	James Genn	Angelica Mendizabal	August 13, 2023
22	6	"Hold Me Closer Tiny Cancer"	James Genn	Moira Stevenson	August 20, 2023
23	7	"Get My Baby Back"	Sheri Elwood	Sheri Elwood & Alexander Nunez	August 27, 2023
24	8	"High Season"	Sheri Elwood	Sheri Elwood and Kate Spurgeon	September 3, 2023

== Production ==
Created by Sheri Elwood for Six Eleven Media and Entertainment One, the series was first announced in 2020 under the working title Feudal.

Following the conclusion of the first season, the CBC announced that the series was renewed for a second season, which is slated to add Allan Hawco to the cast., with Leigh-Ann Rose in a primary recurring role. A third season adds J.D. Martin to the primary cast.

== Release ==
The series was released on Amazon Freevee in the United Kingdom on March 10, 2023, with both seasons and all 16 episodes on the platform at launch. The first season premiered in the United States on The CW on July 7, 2023. The CW decided against airing the second and third seasons, though the second season was released on The CW app.

== Critical response ==
John Doyle of The Globe and Mail wrote that the series had some good and fun aspects, but "there is, literally, too much going on. It’s like there are several series packed into one, and some of those involved aren’t quite sure which one they’re starring in."
