= Upgrade (novel) =

2022 novel by Blake Crouch

- First edition cover
- Author: Blake Crouch
- Language: English
- Genre: Science fiction
- Publisher: Ballantine Books
- Publication date: July 12, 2022
- Publication place: United States
- Media type: Print (hardcover)
- Pages: 341
- ISBN: 978-0-593-15753-4 (hardcover)
- Dewey Decimal: 813/.6
- LC Class: PS3603.R68 U64 2022

Upgrade is a 2022 novel by Blake Crouch. It is his tenth stand-alone novel, published three years after Summer Frost (2019). The novel explores the ethical and existential ramifications of genetic engineering, set in a near-future world where humanity grapples with the consequences of advanced human genetic enhancement.

== Plot ==
In the late 2060s, Logan Ramsay is a law enforcement official working for the Gene Protection Agency (GPA), an organization established in the aftermath of a global famine known as the "Great Starvation", which resulted from an attempt to genetically enhance crops. This catastrophe, which caused the death of 200 million people, was led by Logan's mother, geneticist Miriam Ramsay. Following the disaster, Miriam is believed to have taken her own life, and Logan, implicated in the debacle, was incarcerated.

In Denver, Logan and his partner Nadine apprehend a suspect in illegal genetic engineering activities. Threatening extradition to China, they obtain the address of a DNA lab. Upon investigation, Logan is injured by an explosion that also infects him with an unknown virus. After recovering from severe flu-like symptoms and a notable increase in bone density, Logan discovers enhancements in his cognitive abilities, such as improved focus, comprehension, and memory.

The GPA detains Logan for unauthorized genetic editation and falsely informs his wife, Beth, and daughter, Ava, of his death. He is eventually freed by his sister Kara, who has also undergone a genetic upgrade. They uncover that their mother faked her own death after the Great Starvation and has only recently passed away. It is revealed that she was the architect of her children's genetic alterations, entrusting them with a mission to disseminate this genetic upgrade across humanity to avert impending extinction. Kara is determined to proceed with their mother's plan, while Logan is opposed, leading to an altercation in which Kara attempts to kill him, though Logan manages to escape.

A year later, Logan lives under a new identity and feels alienated from humanity due to his enhancements. When he investigates a disease outbreak in Glasgow, Montana, he discovers that Kara has begun dispersing the upgrade. While beneficial to some, the upgrade proves fatal to others due to deleterious mutations. A confrontation ensues between Logan and Kara in Colorado, at a hideout formerly owned by their mother, where Logan learns of Kara's readiness to accept the potential demise of a billion individuals as collateral for humanity's salvation. Discovering that Kara has undergone a second upgrade that has further enhanced her cognitive and physical capabilities, Logan is unable to overpower her and is once again forced to escape.

Determined to stop Kara, Logan undergoes a second upgrade himself. With the assistance of his former boss and Nadine, he tracks Kara to New York City, intending to prevent her from releasing the upgrade globally. Despite betrayal by Nadine, Logan confronts and kills Kara, who by then had made significant advancements towards a global delivery mechanism for the upgrade.

In the aftermath, Logan develops a new version of the upgrade focused on enhancing empathy, aiming to address humanity's challenges without the extreme measures his mother and sister deemed necessary. Choosing exile to protect his family, he leaves them a journal and a letter explaining his actions and his hope for a future where humanity can navigate its perils with compassion.

== Critical reception ==
According to The New York Times, the novel "is sleek and propulsive, a page-turner with unexpectedly beautiful passages that give you pause amid the thrills."

Upgrade was #6 on the New York Times Best Sellers list in the first week of publication in the category of Hardcover Fiction.
