= The Wayward Pines Trilogy =

2012–14 science fiction novel series by Blake Crouch

- Pines (2012); Wayward (2013); The Last Town (2014)
- Author: Blake Crouch
- Country: United States
- Language: English
- Genre: Mystery; Thriller; Science fiction
- Publisher: Thomas & Mercer
- Published: August 2012 – July 2014
- Media type: Paperback; E-book; Audiobook

The Wayward Pines Trilogy (2012–2014) is a mystery/thriller/science fiction novel series by American author Blake Crouch. It follows U.S. Secret Service agent Ethan Burke as he unravels the mystery surrounding his unanticipated arrival in the small town of Wayward Pines, Idaho, following a devastating car accident. The novels are Pines (2012), Wayward (2013), and The Last Town (2014). In 2015, the novels were adapted into the television series Wayward Pines.

== Overview ==
The plot surrounds Secret Service agent Ethan Burke's introduction to the remote small town of Wayward Pines, his new home from which he cannot escape. The residents of this picturesque town do not know how they got there and are forbidden to talk about their prior lives. An electric fence surrounds the town, and the residents are under 24-hour surveillance. The mysteries and horrors of the town build until Ethan discovers its secret. Then he must do his part to keep Wayward Pines protected from threats both within and beyond the fence.

The series covers themes of isolation, bucolic Americana, time-displacement, man vs nature, human evolution, and cryonics. Crouch says he was inspired by the 1990–1991 TV series Twin Peaks.

== Books ==
| # | Title | Publisher | Date | Pages | ISBN |
|---|---|---|---|---|---|
| 1 | Pines | Thomas & Mercer | August 21, 2012 | 330 | 978-1612183954 |
U.S. Secret Service agent Ethan Burke finds himself in the mysterious small town of Wayward Pines, Idaho, following a devastating car accident. First published in paperback and for Amazon Kindle.
| 2 | Wayward | Thomas & Mercer | September 17, 2013 | 332 | 978-1477808702 |
Now aware of the secret behind Wayward Pines, Ethan uses his role as sheriff to cooperate with the town's founder Dr. Pilcher and protect his fellow residents from the dangers outside—and inside—the town. But a murder investigation puts Ethan on a path to change the way things are run in Wayward Pines.
| 3 | The Last Town | Thomas & Mercer | July 15, 2014 | 306 | 978-1477822586 |
The truth of Wayward Pines and what really lies beyond its borders is revealed, with disastrous results.

== Reception ==
Ryan Daley of Bloody Disgusting named Pines one of his Top 10 Novels of 2012. He later called Wayward "riveting" and even better than Pines. Stacy Alesi of Booklist gave Pines a starred review, writing, "Fans of Stephen King, Peter Straub, and F. Paul Wilson will appreciate this genre-bending, completely riveting thrill ride, which mixes suspense, horror, science fiction, and dystopian nightmare". Reviewing for Suspense Magazine, Amy Lignor wrote that Pines is "completely intriguing" and appeals to fans of King and Dean Koontz. Booklist's Christine Tran lauded Wayward's blending of fantasy and thriller elements, though lacking the suspense of the first book. Publishers Weekly found The Last Town's "thin characterizations and repetitive action" perhaps better suited for its television adaptation.

== Adaptation ==
The novels are the basis for the television series Wayward Pines, produced by M. Night Shyamalan. After reading the source material, he said of the project, "As long as everybody isn't dead, I'm in", his "only rule" to secure his participation. The "big reveal" at the end of Pines is reached halfway through the series in the fifth episode, and the remaining five episodes cover the events of Wayward and The Last Town. Shyamalan noted that the TV series varies from the books in some ways, but as Crouch was still writing the novels while the show was in development, there were "all kinds of cross pollinating" between the two. In December 2015, Fox renewed the series for a second season.
