= Blake Crouch =

American author (born 1978)

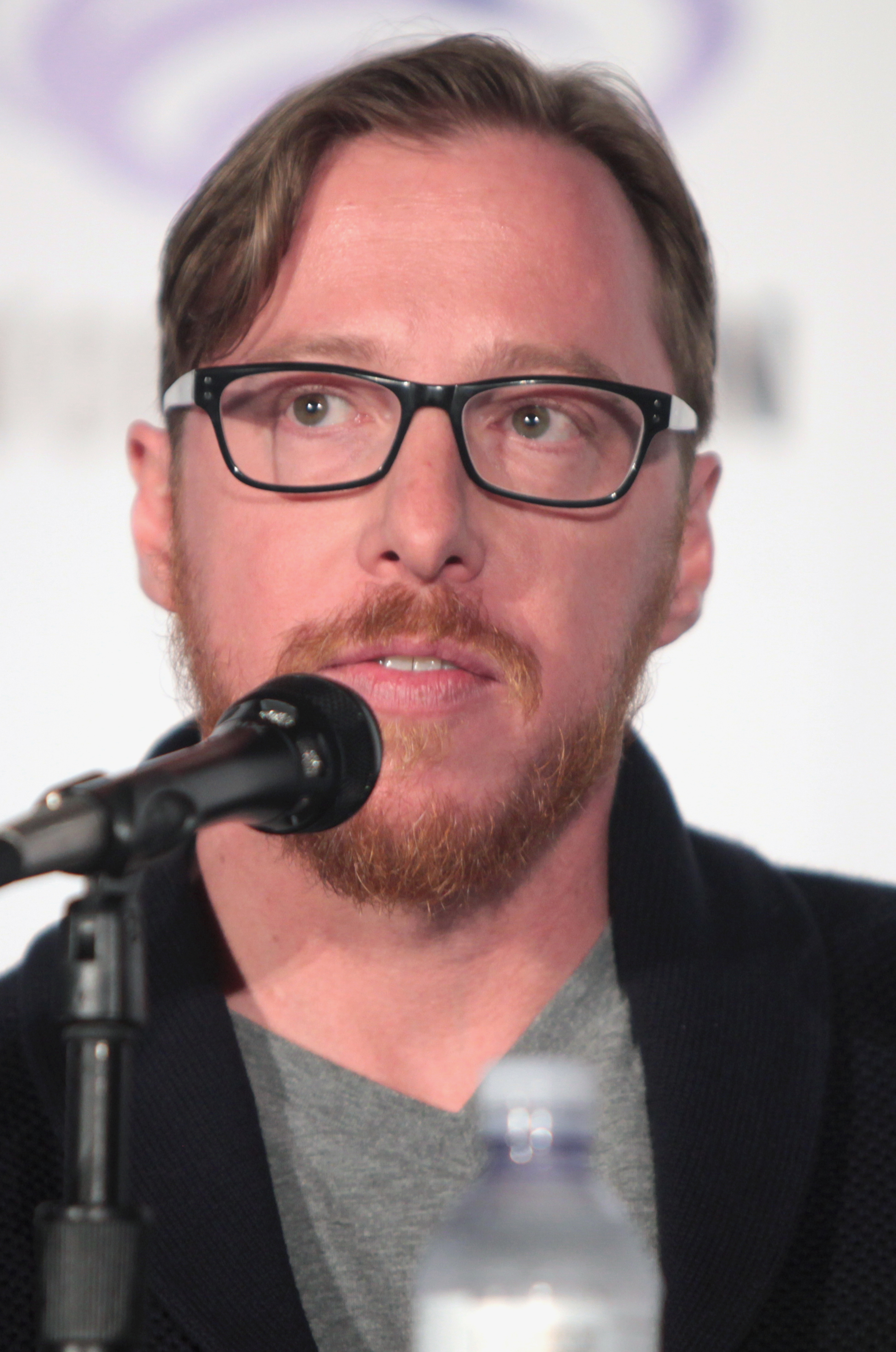
- Crouch in 2016
- Born: William Blake Crouch; October 15, 1978 (age 48); Statesville, North Carolina, U.S.
- Education: University of North Carolina at Chapel Hill
- Occupation: Writer
- Writing career
- Period: 2004–present
- Genres: Mystery; Thriller; Science fiction
- Notable works: The Wayward Pines Trilogy; Dark Matter; Recursion
- Website: blakecrouch.com

William Blake Crouch (born October 15, 1978) is an American author known for books such as Dark Matter, Recursion, Upgrade, and his Wayward Pines Trilogy, which was adapted into a television series in 2015. Dark Matter was adapted for television in 2024.

== Early life and education ==
Crouch was born near the town of Statesville, North Carolina. He attended North Iredell High School and the University of North Carolina at Chapel Hill, graduating in 2000 with degrees in English and creative writing. He began writing short stories and early drafts of his novels while still in middle school.

== Career ==
=== Writing ===
Crouch published his first two novels, Desert Places and Locked Doors, in 2004 and 2005, respectively. In 2011, he self-published the novel Run digitally. In 2016, he released the sci-fi novel Dark Matter. In 2019, he published another sci-fi novel, titled Recursion.

=== Adaptations ===
Crouch's Wayward Pines Trilogy (2012–14) was adapted into the 2015 television series Wayward Pines. Another work, Good Behavior, premiered as a television series in November 2016.

In 2020, Crouch began working on a screenplay to adapt Dark Matter into a television series for Sony Pictures, serving as writer, producer, and showrunner. It premiered on May 8, 2024, on Apple TV+. In August 2024, Apple TV+ renewed Dark Matter for a second season.

== Personal life ==
Crouch married Rebecca Greene on June 20, 1998. They have three children together. The couple divorced in 2017. As of 2019, Crouch was dating Jacquelyn Ben-Zekry.

In 2021, Crouch filed a court case appealing to modify his and Greene's joint agreement for medical decision-making authority for their children, to allow him to vaccinate them over Greene's religious objection to childhood vaccination.

== Awards and recognition ==
- Pines – nominated for the International Thriller Writers Awards "Best Original Paperback Novel" in 2013
- The Last Town – nominated for the 2014 Goodreads Choice Award in the "Horror" category
- Dark Matter – nominated for the 2016 Goodreads Choice Award in the "Science Fiction" category
- Good Behavior (audiobook) – nominated for the 2018 Audie Awards "Best Short Stories or Collections"
- Recursion – won the Goodreads Choice Award for "Best Science Fiction Novel"
- Upgrade – nominated for the 2022 Goodreads Choice Award in the "Romance" category

== Bibliography ==
=== Andrew Z. Thomas / Luther Kite series ===
- Desert Places (2004)
- Locked Doors (2005)
- Break You (2011)
- Stirred (with J. A. Konrath, 2011)

=== Wayward Pines Trilogy ===
- Pines (2012)
- Wayward (2013)
- The Last Town (2014)

=== Stand-alone novels ===
- Abandon (2009)
- Famous (2010)
- Snowbound (2010)
- Run (2011)
- Eerie (with Jordan Crouch) (2012)
- Dark Matter (2016)
- Good Behavior (2016)
- Summer Frost (2019)
- Recursion (2019)
- Upgrade (2022)
