= Recursion (Crouch novel) =

2019 novel by Blake Crouch

- First edition cover
- Author: Blake Crouch
- Cover artist: Christopher Brand
- Language: English
- Genres: Science fiction; Thriller
- Publisher: Crown Publishing Group
- Publication date: June 11, 2019
- Publication place: United States
- Media type: Hardback
- Pages: 326
- ISBN: 978-1-5247-5978-0

Recursion is a thriller science fiction novel by American writer Blake Crouch, first published in the United States in June 2019 by the Crown Publishing Group, a subsidiary of Penguin Random House. The novel explores themes of memory, identity, and time.

== Plot ==
In 2018, NYPD detective Barry Sutton encounters a woman afflicted by False Memory Syndrome (FMS), a condition causing memories of lives never lived. After he fails to prevent her suicide, Barry investigates FMS, leading him to a strange Hotel Memory, operated by business magnate Marcus Slade. Slade captures Barry and interrogates him about his greatest regret. Intent on proving the value of his technology and buying Barry's cooperation, Slade forcibly sends Barry back to the night his daughter Meghan died in a hit-and-run accident 11 years prior. Barry saves Meghan, altering the course of their lives.

Ripple effects caused by the clients of Hotel Memory begin to appear as the date of the original present approaches. Inconsistencies are initially limited to clients' immediate social networks, but when New York's skyline changes, FMS symptoms erupt on a mass scale. On the anniversary of Barry's memory jump, Barry's family regains their memories of a timeline where Meghan had died. Overwhelmed by the influx of false memories and uncertain what is real, Meghan commits suicide.

In 2007, Helena Smith, a neuroscientist focused on Alzheimer's research, works on a "memory chair" designed to replay past experiences. When her research grants run dry, venture capitalist Marcus Slade offers her funding to continue her research on a remote oil rig. Slade guides Helena towards building a deprivation tank intended for time travel through death and resurrection. He reveals that in the original timeline he was Helena's lab assistant, and they unknowingly caused research subjects to time travel when recalling memories. When Slade realized this, he killed Helena and sent himself back in time to become a billionaire. Realizing she is a captive on Slade's oil rig and horrified by this perversion of her research, Helena uses her technology to escape to before she accepted Slade's deal, knowing that when time catches up, Slade will regain his memories.

As their paths converge, Barry and Helena unite to invade Hotel Memory and destroy the chair for good, in order to prevent misuse of the memory chair technology. Barry and Helena kill Slade at Hotel Memory, and Slade reveals that there's a limit on how many times the chair can be used, by the same person. Officers invade the building, resulting in Barry's death, government seizure of the technology, and Helena's detention by DARPA. While detained, Helena is forced to cooperate on a project that uses the memory chair for limited benevolent purposes, such as undoing school shootings, but the project is commandeered by the military. Helena's team experiences a dizzying reliving and undoing of various cataclysms and they realize they aren't the only ones with the chair. The technology proliferates among governments, terrorist groups, and companies. Nations scramble to develop their own chairs and threaten military action should the chair be used again. Desperate, Helena travels back to a savepoint in her teens to try to buy herself more time.

Helena repeatedly begins a relationship with Barry in her twenties and enlists his aid, but despite their efforts, each attempt to solve the crisis and eliminate false memories fails, and ends with her traveling back to her teens again. Eventually, her mind fractures and she can't continue the cycle. Traumatized by her failures and the jumble of multiple timelines in her head, Helena's mental health deteriorates and she dies. Barry decides to end his life, only to be stopped by the resurgence of memories as timeline recollection hits the population. He remembers kidnapping Slade and forcing him to confront the world's iterated annihilation. Slade admits he faked an experimental disaster on the oil rig to ensure Helena believed she would die if she tried to access "dead memory" timelines, but this method is key to overwriting false memories. Barry realizes he must return to the very first timeline, before Slade killed Helena and made his first time jump. Barry kills Slade the day he would have killed Helena, thereby preventing all other timelines. Finally, Barry reunites with Helena at a bar, and the story ends.

== Critical reception ==
In a starred review, Publishers Weekly described Recursion as an "intelligent, mind-bending thriller". It stated: "Crouch effortlessly integrates sophisticated philosophical concepts into a complex and engrossing plot." Kirkus Reviews called Recursion an "exciting, thought-provoking mind-bender". It said the book is a stimulating exploration of grief and memory and how they define who we are. Rebecca Vnuk wrote in Booklist that readers may not understand the physics behind the story, "but, in a peculiar way, that's part of the fun."

In a review of the book in The New York Times, American author Victor LaValle described Recursion as "a heady campfire tale of a novel built for summer reading". He said the journey it follows "is a gloriously twisting line that regularly confounded my expectations." While all those paranormal podcasts are often rejected as fringe entertainment, LaValle stated "that doesn’t diminish my enjoyment of these shows." He explained that "I'm a skeptic, though not quite an unbeliever". Novels like Recursion tend to be dismissed for similar reasons, but LaValle opined, "I believe they capture the disquiet of millions; they broadcast at an anxious frequency. The sense that our country’s center is not holding pulses through the novel. The fear that we are losing our collective memory, of a stable nation for instance, doesn't read to me like fantasy."

== Translations ==
Recursion was translated into Portuguese as Recursão? and published by Intrinseca in January 2020. It was also translated into German by Rainer Schmidt as Gestohlene Erinnerung and published by Goldmann in March 2020.
