= Recursive function =

Recursive function may refer to:

- Recursive function (programming), a function which references itself
- General recursive function, a computable partial function from natural numbers to natural numbers
  - Primitive recursive function, a function which can be computed with loops of bounded length
- Another name for computable function

== See also ==
- Recurrence relation, an equation which defines a sequence from initial values
- Recursion theory, the study of computability
