= Wayward Pines =

American mystery science fiction television series

- Genre: Mystery; Science fiction; Thriller; Horror
- Based on: The Wayward Pines novels by Blake Crouch
- Developed by: Chad Hodge
- Showrunners: Chad Hodge (season 1); Mark Friedman (season 2)
- Starring: Matt Dillon; Carla Gugino; Toby Jones; Shannyn Sossamon; Reed Diamond; Tim Griffin; Charlie Tahan; Juliette Lewis; Melissa Leo; Terrence Howard; Jason Patric; Nimrat Kaur; Josh Helman; Tom Stevens; Kacey Rohl; Hope Davis; Djimon Hounsou
- Composer: Charlie Clouser
- Country of origin: United States
- Original language: English
- No. of seasons: 2
- No. of episodes: 20

Production
- Executive producers: Donald De Line; Ashwin Rajan; Chad Hodge; M. Night Shyamalan; Blake Crouch; Anna Fricke; Mark Friedman
- Producers: Ron French; Shawn Williamson
- Production locations: British Columbia, Canada
- Cinematography: Amy Vincent; Gregory Middleton; Jim Denault; Mathias Herndl
- Editors: Doc Crotzer; Tim Mirkovich; Michael Ruscio; Leo Trombetta
- Running time: 42–44 minutes
- Production companies: Olive Entertainment; Blinding Edge Pictures; De Line Pictures; Storyland; FX Productions (season 1); 20th Century Fox Television (season 2)

Original release
- Network: Fox
- Release: May 14, 2015 – July 27, 2016

Wayward Pines is an American mystery science fiction television series based on the Wayward Pines novels by Blake Crouch. Developed for television by Chad Hodge, the pilot was directed by M. Night Shyamalan, with both as executive producers. The series premiered on Fox on May 14, 2015, and the first season concluded on July 23, 2015.

On December 9, 2015, Fox renewed the series for a second season which aired from May 25 to July 27, 2016. The series was canceled in 2018.

== Premise ==
In the first season, Ethan Burke is a U.S. Secret Service agent investigating the disappearance of two fellow agents in the mysterious small town of Wayward Pines, Idaho. Ethan awakens from a car accident unable to contact the outside world and unable to leave. He finds one of the agents dead and the other, his former lover Kate Hewson, settled down in the seemingly idyllic town. But the inhabitants of Wayward Pines are trapped there by an electrified fence and set of rules enforced by the strict Sheriff Arnold Pope. Any attempt to escape is punished by a public execution known as a "reckoning" where the Sheriff cuts the condemned's throat. Ethan reconnects with his wife and son while working to discover the truth.

In the second season, Dr. Theo Yedlin is a surgeon who is caught in the battle between Jason Higgins, leader of the First Generation, which took over Wayward Pines following the Abbie incident that closed season 1, and the underground rebels led by Ethan's son Ben Burke. The series ends with the last 871 humans of Wayward Pines placed in cryo hibernation, while Yedlin executes a biological warfare plan to commit genocide of the planet's entire Abbie species – despite having determined they have an advanced intelligence – so that the minuscule number of humans remaining on Earth might regain control and save their species.

== Main cast and characters ==
- Matt Dillon as Ethan Burke (season 1)
- Carla Gugino as Kate Hewson (season 1, guest season 2)
- Toby Jones as David Pilcher, alias Dr. Jenkins (season 1, guest season 2)
- Shannyn Sossamon as Theresa Burke (season 1, guest season 2)
- Reed Diamond as Harold Ballinger (season 1)
- Tim Griffin as Adam Hassler
- Charlie Tahan as Ben Burke (main season 1, guest season 2)
- Juliette Lewis as Beverly Brown (season 1)
- Melissa Leo as Pamela "Pam" Pilcher (season 1, guest season 2)
- Terrence Howard as Sheriff Arnold Pope (season 1, guest season 2)
- Jason Patric as Dr. Theodore "Theo" Yedlin (season 2)
- Nimrat Kaur as Rebecca Yedlin (season 2)
- Josh Helman as Xander Beck (season 2)
- Tom Stevens as Jason Higgins (recurring season 1, main season 2)
- Kacey Rohl as Kerry Campbell (season 2)
- Hope Davis as Megan Fisher (recurring season 1, main season 2)
- Djimon Hounsou as Christopher James "C.J." Mitchum (season 2)

== Production ==
Wayward Pines was executive produced by Chad Hodge with M. Night Shyamalan, Donald De Line, and Ashwin Rajan. The pilot episode was written by Hodge and directed by Shyamalan. The series was officially picked up on May 13, 2013, with a ten-episode order. Filming took place between August 19, 2013, and February 14, 2014, in Coquitlam, Burnaby (interiors) and Agassiz (exteriors), in British Columbia. The plot of Crouch's first novel in the trilogy, Pines (2012), is covered over the first five episodes of the TV series. The second and third novels, Wayward (2013) and The Last Town (2014), make up the remaining five episodes. After reading the source material, Shyamalan said of the project, "As long as everybody isn't dead, I'm in"—his "only rule" to secure his participation. He noted that the TV series varies from the books in some ways, but as Crouch was still writing the novels while the show was in development, there was "all kinds of cross pollinating" between the two. In June 2015, Deadline Hollywood reported that Fox was considering a second season based on the series' impressive ratings. Though Hodge asserted that, from a creative standpoint, "Wayward Pines was always designed to be just these 10 episodes" in concert with the plotline of the books, he allowed for the possibility of another season. He said that in the finale viewers would "see a window to that, but it also is a complete ending as it is."

With the tenth episode having been billed as the "series finale", and the entire story from the source trilogy of books having been adapted, the show was effectively finished. However, on December 9, 2015, Fox renewed Wayward Pines for a second season, to premiere in mid-2016, continuing the story using original material.

After the conclusion of the first season, Chad Hodge stepped down from his position as showrunner and executive producer for the series. Mark Friedman succeeded Hodge as showrunner for season two. Season two has a largely new main cast, with several lead actors from season one either not returning at all or appearing only as recurring characters in the second season. This is in part because a few actors—notably Terrence Howard and Juliette Lewis—committed to other projects in the time between the filming and the airing of Season One.

== Episodes ==
Season	Episodes	Originally released	
Season	Episodes	First released	Last released
1	10	May 14, 2015	July 23, 2015
2	10	May 25, 2016	July 27, 2016

=== Season 1 (2015) ===
No. overall	No. in season	Title	Directed by	Written by	Original release date	Prod. code	US viewers (millions)
1	1	"Where Paradise Is Home"	M. Night Shyamalan	Chad Hodge	May 14, 2015	YJU101	3.76
U.S. Secret Service Agent Ethan Burke awakens from a car accident on the outskirts of Wayward Pines, Idaho. After entering town and collapsing in a coffee shop, he recalls driving with Agent Stallings, searching for Agents Kate Hewson and Bill Evans. Beverly, a bartender, gives him a note with an address where he finds the decaying corpse of Agent Evans, which he reports to an uninterested Sheriff Pope. When Ethan is subsequently hospitalized, psychiatrist Dr. Jenkins suggests surgery, but Beverly helps Ethan escape. In Seattle, Dr. Jenkins meets with Ethan's boss, Adam Hassler, and tells him everything is going as planned. Ethan's wife, Theresa, wonders if he has run off with Kate, his former mistress. Ethan finds Kate in Wayward Pines, but she is noticeably older than when he saw her five weeks earlier, and she claims to have been there for 12 years. Ethan steals a car to leave town, only to discover that a high electric fence blocks the only exits from Wayward Pines. Sheriff Pope tells him that he can never leave.
2	2	"Do Not Discuss Your Life Before"	Charlotte Sieling	Chad Hodge	May 21, 2015	YJU102	4.59
Defying Pope's orders to stay put, Ethan goes to the morgue to inspect Evans's clothing and retrieve his journal with a map of the area. He learns that Evans was married and speaks with his widow, who claims her husband committed suicide in front of her. Ethan inspects the map to find a way past the fence, and he and Beverly plan to escape after removing the tracking devices implanted in them. Meanwhile, Ethan's wife, Theresa, and son, Ben, set out for Idaho to find Ethan. Before Ethan and Beverly can escape, they are invited to dinner by Kate and her husband, Harold Ballinger. There, Beverly slips and mentions something from her recent past, breaking one of the town's rules (for her, the year is 2000, and she has been in town since 1999). She panics, and she and Ethan leave. Kate tells Harold she is sure they will run. Phones around town begin to ring, and the townspeople are mobilized to search for Ethan and Beverly, who separate. Beverly is caught, and then executed by Sheriff Pope in front of the entire town in what he calls a "reckoning".
3	3	"Our Town, Our Law"	Zal Batmanglij	Chad Hodge	May 28, 2015	YJU103	3.97
Kate warns Ethan that he has been given a rare second chance after Beverly's execution. Theresa and Ben follow Ethan to Wayward Pines, but Sheriff Pope intercepts them en route. While attempting escape, Ethan finds Theresa's car, which looks to have been abandoned for years. The Burkes are reunited, but before Ethan explains the odd events to Theresa, he goes to confront Sheriff Pope. Ethan meets Kate, who explains that she tried to escape for years, but the only way to survive is to play along. After Ben sees Ethan and Kate together, he and Theresa try to leave, but Sheriff Pope stops them. Ethan intervenes, and when Pope points a gun at him, Ben runs over Pope with the sheriff's truck. Ethan opens a gate in the perimeter fence with Pope's remote, but before the Burkes can drive out, something enters and drags Pope's body beyond the fence. Hearing bestial cries, Ethan closes the gate.
4	4	"One of Our Senior Realtors Has Chosen to Retire"	Zal Batmanglij	Steven Levenson	June 4, 2015	YJU104	4.20
Ethan explains all he knows about Wayward Pines to Theresa, and they agree to play "happy family" until Ethan can investigate. Ethan learns from Mayor Brad Fisher that he has been named the new sheriff. Playing along, Ethan soon finds a hidden cache of files about the town's residents, which includes information about their former lives. Ben is welcomed to Wayward Pines Academy by its principal, Megan Fisher, the mayor's wife, who Ethan has learned used to be a hypnotherapist. Nurse Pam and Ethan face off over "insurgent" realtor Peter McCall. Told by a mysterious caller that a reckoning is required for Peter, Ethan instead takes the man to the perimeter fence in hopes of hiding him. Peter indicates the cliffside as the only way to escape from the town. Knowing that Ethan needs to do as he is told in order to gain time to solve the mystery of Wayward Pines, Peter kills himself by making it look like Ethan pushed him into the electric fence. Later, Ethan begins climbing the rock face to escape and get help as a mysterious figure awaits him on the other side of the fence.
5	5	"The Truth"	James Foley	Blake Crouch and The Duffer Brothers	June 11, 2015	YJU105	4.24
Ethan is slashed and stalked by violent humanoid predators as he makes his way through the woods toward Boise. During his orientation at the academy, Ben learns some of the truth about Wayward Pines: humans have evolved into "Abbies" (aberrations), the result of a series of genetic mutations, and are now vicious carnivores who dominate a wasted Earth in the year 4028. The citizen-abductees of Wayward Pines were kept in hibernation chambers for over two thousand years before being awakened in the town, which is essentially an ark to re-introduce and protect the human race to ensure its future. Principal Fisher tells the students they cannot reveal this truth to their parents. Ethan comes upon the ruins of Boise. A helicopter arrives with Dr. Jenkins, who introduces himself as David Pilcher, creator of Wayward Pines. He explains that the town is humanity's only sanctuary.
6	6	"Choices"	Jeff T. Thomas	The Duffer Brothers and Brett Conrad	June 25, 2015	YJU106	3.45
Dr. Pilcher takes Ethan to the town's secret control center and tells him the history of Wayward Pines. In the 1990s, Pilcher discovered the mutant gene and predicted the coming of the Abbies, but the scientific community shunned him. While he was able to recruit a number of volunteers for his project, the bulk of participants were abducted. Keeping everyone in cryochambers for over 2000 years, Pilcher and his closest associates (including Pam) awakened in 4014 to find that they were the last remaining humans. The initial townspeople awakened—"Group A"—were told the truth about the world outside Wayward Pines. Unable to handle the truth, they all perished, either by suicide, violent anarchy or by escaping and falling victim to the Abbies. The adults of the current "Group B" have not been told the truth, but Pilcher is aware that a secret faction is disaffected and planning to breach the wall. Pilcher awakened Ethan to impose order on Wayward Pines. Ethan is willing, but only on his terms. Meanwhile, the Ballingers are building a bomb as part of their plan to finally escape.
7	7	"Betrayal"	Steve Shill	Rob Fresco	July 2, 2015	YJU107	3.38
Theresa thinks something nefarious has been done to Ethan when he tells her that it is the year 4028. He finds a pipe bomb in his vehicle and begins investigating the conspiracy. Theresa investigates Plot #33 and finds that a metal structure lies beneath the empty lot. Ethan finds that a former explosives expert, Franklin Dobbs, planted the bomb and soon discovers that Harold is involved in the secret group. He correctly surmises that Kate is the group's leader. Kate thinks Ethan's story about what lies beyond the fence is the result of brainwashing, telling Theresa she got a call out to Hassler within her first week in Wayward Pines. Kate pushes up the group's plan to blast through the wall to that night. Ethan intercepts Kate and her accomplices at the fence before they succeed but soon realizes there is another bomb that is headed to the fence in a delivery truck. He is in pursuit when the bomb—inadvertently armed by Amy—detonates early, leaving Amy injured and Ben bloody and unconscious.
8	8	"The Friendliest Place on Earth"	Tim Hunter	Patrick Aison and Rob Fresco & Chad Hodge & Blake Crouch	July 9, 2015	YJU108	3.37
In the aftermath of the explosion, Ben is hospitalized and Ethan and Pilcher try to locate the remaining members of the conspiracy. Suspecting that someone on his surveillance staff is aiding the rebels, Pilcher tasks Pam to investigate. Megan Fisher tells an awakened Ben that Ethan had the bomber in custody but let him go because he is Kate's husband Harold. Ethan confronts a jailed Kate, who refuses to cooperate with his investigation. Harold and Alan steal a dump truck to ram the fence, but Harold stays behind for Kate. Alan makes it to the other side of the fence with the body of a fellow conspirator he hopes to bury, but the two are immediately attacked by Abbies.
9	9	"A Reckoning"	Nimród Antal	The Duffer Brothers	July 16, 2015	YJU109	3.25
Ethan arrives at the fence just in time to stop three Abbies from breaching it. He convinces Harold to give him the names of the remaining 14 conspirators, but Ethan soon finds that they have all removed their tracking chips and gone off the grid. Three young men from the "First Generation", led by Jason Higgins, storm the jail wanting to reckon Kate, Harold, Franklin, and two others. They are initially thwarted by Arlene but return later, and Jason executes all except Kate, who survives only when Ethan arrives to shoot her attacker. Meanwhile, prompted by a conflicted Pam, Theresa has gone into the tunnel system under Plot #33 and finds a video of Adam Hassler making a report from the ruins of San Francisco in the year 4020, which she shows to Ethan and Kate. Ethan tells Pilcher he now believes he must reckon Kate, and insists the whole town be there. Instead, Ethan tells them all the truth about Pilcher and Wayward Pines. Observing, Pilcher cuts power to the town—including the fence.
10	10	"Cycle"	Tim Hunter	The Duffer Brothers and Chad Hodge & Blake Crouch	July 23, 2015	YJU110	3.98
Scores of Abbies breach the perimeter of Wayward Pines. Learning what Pilcher has done, Ethan and Kate direct the assembled citizens to the bunker under Plot 33, but not before the Abbies begin to arrive and slaughter everyone they can. Jason, still recovering from being shot by Ethan, heads to safety in another bunker with members of the First Generation. Pam objects to Pilcher's intent to wipe the town clean and start over with "Group C", so he has her refrozen against her will. The townspeople flee through a tunnel from the bunker to the mountain complex, with Abbies in pursuit. The volunteers, about to be refrozen by Pilcher's security force, rebel and reawaken Pam who kills Pilcher. With the survivors (including Theresa and Ben) safe in the complex, Ethan sacrifices himself to stop the rest of the Abbies. Ben is injured and wakes up in the hospital; it is three years later and Amy, now a nurse, tells him that "they" are listening. Jason and the First Generation have seized control of Wayward Pines and frozen most of the adults. As Ben walks through the town, he finds that Jason has become the sheriff—and corpses are strung up on lampposts bearing signs saying, "DO NOT TRY TO LEAVE".

=== Season 2 (2016) ===
No. overall	No. in season	Title	Directed by	Written by	Original release date	Prod. code	US viewers (millions)
11	1	"Enemy Lines"	David Petrarca	Mark Friedman	May 25, 2016	2AZF01	3.06
It is now 4032, and two factions have arisen in Wayward Pines: the official leadership of Jason Higgins and the First Generation (aided by Megan Fisher) who use any means necessary to maintain Pilcher's original vision, and a group of underground rebels led by Ben Burke who oppose the iron-hand rule of the First Generation. Over 2000 years ago in Hawaii, Arnold Pope shares a vision with Dr. Theo Yedlin, a successful surgeon, saying Yedlin can "help a thousand people". Yedlin is awakened in Wayward Pines, disoriented, and is told by Jason and his aide Kerry Campbell that he is part of a government experiment. They ask him to operate on an "important person", shown to be Kate Hewson. While the operation is successful, Kate takes her own life after a discussion with Megan. Theo then witnesses the public execution of members of Ben's group, and sees his wife, Rebecca, in the crowd. Ben and Xander turn themselves in to stop further killings, and they are thrown in a truck with Theo. The truck is sent to the other side of the fence, where the group now has to deal with approaching Abbies.
12	2	"Blood Harvest"	Brad Turner	Story by : Mark Friedman and Michael R. Perry; Teleplay by : Michael R. Perry	June 1, 2016	2AZF02	2.52
Scores of Abbies sacrifice themselves at the electric fence to build a pile of bodies and allow other Abbies to breach the wall. Jason and a team thwart the attack, but Kerry is injured, causing Jason to allow Theo's rescue. Ben is left to fend for himself on the other side, much to Theresa's concern. Having leverage, Theo demands an explanation from Jason before operating on Kerry. Jason tells him the truth about Wayward Pines. Theo learns that Rebecca has been a Wayward Pines resident for three years. C.J. tells Jason that the food growing on the other side of the wall is ready to be harvested, and a team uses guns and flamethrowers to hold off the Abbies while collecting the food. Ben tries to get on a truck to return, but is unsuccessful. Finding a camera at the fence, Ben reveals to anyone watching that Jason sent a First Generation resident to his death (a violation of Pilcher's rules). Ben is then overcome by Abbies. Unable to spot any Abbies on camera, Jason thinks they've finally driven them away, but one soon runs past the edge of a corn field.
13	3	"Once Upon a Time in Wayward Pines"	John Krokidas	Anna Fricke	June 8, 2016	2AZF03	2.37
Pam Pilcher narrates the story of Jason – the first baby awoken in Wayward Pines – and how special he was treated growing up. In the present day, Jason, C.J. and a team make plans to expand Wayward Pines beyond its current size. Pam is shown to be confined to a house on the outskirts of the town for killing her brother, but she shows up in Jason's office and convinces him they need to work together for the good of all residents. Jason publicly forgives Pam, but she soon hatches a plan to infect the town with smallpox virus. Pam calls Wayward Pines a "mistake", and insists that Jason let the last of humanity die off peacefully. Pam is caught and contained while the virus is still in the incubation period. When Pam tells Theo about what happened in Hawaii over 2000 years ago, Theo confronts Rebecca, suggesting she was one of Pilcher's volunteers. At the Academy, Megan instructs young teens on how to get pregnant, soon after they start menstruating. Following Pam's misdeeds, Jason takes her into the woods and strangles her to death.
14	4	"Exit Strategy"	Ti West	Nazrin Choudhury	June 15, 2016	2AZF04	2.48
Xander, the third person sent to the other side of the fence by Jason, finds himself in a pit dug by the Abbies. He manages to get out and work his way back to town when he encounters a heavily-bearded and disheveled Adam Hassler. Theo treats Hassler, after which Jason grills Theo to see if Hassler revealed any info about the Abbies. Jason explains that Hassler is one of 12 "nomads" Pilcher sent out several years ago to investigate the world beyond Wayward Pines, and is the only one to make it back. C.J. and a team go outside the fence to search for fertile soil, but C.J. secretly tells Theo the trip is more about providing hope than it is about food. Theresa insists on joining the team so she can find Ben, and when she discovers his body, she blames Hassler. Elsewhere, Rebecca tries to protect Lucy, a girl not yet 12 years old, from Megan's reproduction mandate, after Lucy reveals she has started menstruating. At the end of the episode, Lucy's brother Frank encounters an Abbie on the town's merry-go-round.
15	5	"Sound the Alarm"	Alrick Riley	Edward Ricourt	June 22, 2016	2AZF05	2.32
The Abbie that Frank sees is tranquilized and later studied by Megan and her team. It is the first female Abbie they've ever seen or captured. The backstory of Rebecca is revealed in a flashback to the early 2000s, when Pilcher approached her about being the chief architect for Wayward Pines. Excited, Rebecca designed the entire town, but backed out when Megan revealed when and why the town would actually be built. In present day Wayward Pines, Rebecca says Pilcher had her kidnapped. She also reveals to Theo that she is married to Xander. Outside the walls of Wayward Pines, C.J. and his team set up camp, and Theresa says she wants to stay on that side to be close to Ben. Hassler reveals that he purposely sent Ethan to find Kate and be abducted by Pilcher's men because he wanted to get rid of him and be close to Theresa. It was only after Theresa and Ben followed Ethan that he changed his mind about being one of Pilcher's volunteers. At the end of the episode, Abbies approach C.J.'s camp bearing torches.
16	6	"City Upon a Hill"	Vincenzo Natali	Tyler Hisel	June 29, 2016	2AZF06	2.27
Abbies set fire to the remaining crops outside the fence, and attack C.J.'s team. Theresa is critically injured. Jason and his soldiers arrive to get as many humans as they can to safety. Xander and a small team aid in the rescue, after Rebecca helps them steal weapons from the mountain facility. Several people need treatment at the hospital, forcing Theo to set up a hasty triage. 35 humans are killed in the attack, and Mario tells Jason their fighting force now numbers fewer than 20. Hassler visits Theresa, who is on life support, and a flashback shows him regretting his decision to let Pilcher abduct Ethan. Theresa flatlines soon after. C.J. says the previously harvested food will only last about six weeks. Theo notes that certain drugs and medical supplies are also running dangerously low. Megan conducts an MRI on the female Abbie, whom a lab technician named "Margaret". Theo observes that the reasoning center in Margaret's brain is twice the size of a typical human. Hassler learns there is a female Abbie in captivity, and asks Theo if she has a distinctive mark on her palm, which she does.
17	7	"Time Will Tell"	Jeff T. Thomas	Anna Fricke	July 6, 2016	2AZF07	2.28
In flashbacks, C.J. is awoken briefly from his cryo chamber every 20 years starting in 2034, allowing him to observe the slow destruction of humanity. In 2514, he encounters one of the last humans on earth, a man whose clawed fingers show the beginnings of the mutant gene taking form. When C.J. awakes with Pilcher in 4014, Pilcher is surprised to spot an Abbie, saying the mutation should have run its course by then. In 4016, Megan prepares a celebration for the awakening of Group A, but C.J. warns her what a shock it will be. In the present day, Theo attempts to communicate with Margaret using flash cards, believing the Abbie to be highly intelligent, while Megan remains skeptical. Tests show that Margaret is dominant over the male Abbies. Hassler soon confirms that Margaret is their leader, and that her captivity is causing the increase of Abbies outside the fence. In front of Jason and Kerry, Margaret indicates that Theo should be the "leader". Angered, Jason shoots and kills the captive male Abbies, but Kerry stops him from shooting Margaret. Later, Megan is left alone with Margaret, who escapes her cage by entering the lock code she observed Theo using, and she slashes Megan with a scalpel, leaving her to bleed out on the floor.
18	8	"Pass Judgment"	Jennifer Lynch	Seamus Kevin Fahey	July 13, 2016	2AZF08	2.38
Xander and Rebecca discuss their future together, revealing she is pregnant. Theo tells Kerry that the Abbie attack she suffered did too much damage for her to bear children. Theo soon finds Megan's dead body and Margaret's empty cage. Jason sounds the alert in town, and dispatches soldiers to try and gun down the Abbie leader. In Jason's office, Rebecca steals hard copies that show the layout of the original town (before Wayward Pines was built over it), to try and determine how Margaret got in and where she might go to get out. Margaret appears about to attack Rebecca when Xander shoots the Abbie in her hand and wrist. Margaret flees to the woods and prepares to enter an old water duct. Hassler spots her and raises his rifle, but then lowers it and lets Margaret go. Hassler soon follows Margaret through the pipe. Margaret is shown wincing in pain as she remembers brutal attacks by Pilcher and his team to clear the Abbies out of the area that would become Wayward Pines. Jason reveals a secret room with two cryo pods to Kerry, saying they can wake up in the future and be like Adam and Eve. Kerry then drops the bombshell that she cannot have children.
19	9	"Walcott Prep"	Mathias Herndl	Mark Friedman	July 20, 2016	2AZF09	2.04
Citing the need to have a "bridge" between generations in Wayward Pines, Pilcher visits Walcott Prep in 2013 to meet Abigail, a pregnant student giving up her child for adoption. But Abigail later loses the baby. In present day Wayward Pines, the Abbie horde has increased at least tenfold. Knowing the Abbies will breach the wall at some point and easily overcome the humans, Jason determines the only way for humanity to survive is to put everyone back into cryo suspension. Jason has C.J. and Theo work on the specifics. C.J. learns they can't power all of the cryo pods, and can only take about half of the population. Jason suggests to Theo that they select the best and leave behind the defective and subversive, but Theo thinks it should be random. In 2013, Pilcher visits another young woman who has agreed to let him adopt her baby; the woman is shown to be Kerry. Back in the present, Jason finds confidential files and learns the horrifying truth that Kerry is his mother. He angrily confronts Kerry, and after a scuffle, Jason's gun goes off. A bloodied Jason is later shown lying next to Kerry. Outside the fence, Margaret recovers and gathers the Abbies to prepare for attack.
20	10	"Bedtime Story"	Ti West	Mark Friedman	July 27, 2016	2AZF10	2.22
Jason is brought to the hospital in critical condition, and Theo's attempts to save him are not successful. Oscar points out a critical surgical step Theo missed, and suggests that he let Jason die. As Margaret rallies the Abbie attackers at the perimeter, C.J. and Theo make plans to populate the limited number of working cryo units, though Theo is not happy with the fact that other residents will be left to the Abbies. When Theo learns that Xander will not join Rebecca in cryo, he rearranges plans and saves Xander – as well as Arlene and Frank. Still believing that the survival of the last few hundred humans on Earth is all that counts, Theo makes plans to inject himself with three deadly diseases (typhoid, Marburg virus, and the bubonic plague) and let the Abbies eat him, hoping to commit genocide of that entire species before the last humans awake again. Kerry discovers the plan and injects herself, saying Theo is needed in the future more than her. She then walks out to be consumed by the Abbies.

== Broadcast ==
On May 12, 2014, Fox announced that Wayward Pines would premiere in 2015 as mid-season replacement. The series was picked up for broadcast by Fox in the United Kingdom, and by FX in Australia from May 14, 2015, where the premiere was the second most watched program on subscription television with 101,000 viewers.

Fox made the pilot available on demand and through various online outlets from April 23 to 30, 2015, in what the network called "the first-ever global preview event". The series subsequently debuted on May 14, 2015, simultaneously in more than 126 countries in what Fox called "the world's largest day-and-date launch for a scripted series ever". Due to time zones, episodes of the first season aired first in Australia.

== Digital companion series ==
A companion webseries, titled Gone and written and directed by Christopher Leone, aired on the Fox website alongside the weekly episodes of Wayward Pines. The series follows Eric Barlow, a rocket scientist, as he searches for his missing wife Sarah, a journalist, after she leaves a goodbye message and leaves him. He finds himself led toward a mountain in Idaho with the help of Sarah's colleague Elena, where he finds a man involved in the construction of Wayward Pines. Arriving at the site, a technician leads him to Sarah who is frozen in a prototype chamber, but it is really him they were after.

== Reception ==
On Rotten Tomatoes season one holds a rating of 78% based on 77 reviews. The site's critical consensus reads, "Creepy and strange in the best way possible, Wayward Pines is a welcome return to form for M. Night Shyamalan." The fifth episode, "The Truth", received an individual rating of 83% based on 12 reviews. On Metacritic, the first season has a score of 66 out of 100 based on 34 critics for season 1 "generally favorable reviews". Rotten Tomatoes rated the second season 43% based on 14 reviews. The site's critical consensus reads, "Wayward Pines drifts away from the intrigue and mystery established during its debut season, slipping into a dull, repetitive, and trite narrative."

=== Awards and nominations ===
Year	Award	Category	Nominee	Result	Ref
2016	Saturn Awards	Best Science Fiction Television Series		Nominated	
2016	Saturn Awards	Best Actor on Television	Matt Dillon	Nominated	
2016	Saturn Awards	Best Supporting Actor on Television	Toby Jones	Nominated	
2016	Saturn Awards	Best Supporting Actress on Television	Melissa Leo	Nominated	
2017	Leo Awards	Best Lead Performance by a Male in a Dramatic Series	Tom Stevens	Nominated	
2017	Leo Awards	Best Guest Performance by a Male in a Dramatic Series	Dakota Daulby	Nominated	
