= Tom Stevens (actor) =

Canadian actor, producer, and musician

- Born: Thomas James Stevens; June 24, 1987 (age 39); Vancouver, British Columbia, Canada
- Education: Douglas College (2009)
- Occupations: Actor, producer, musician
- Spouse: Erika Valliere (m. 2011)

Thomas James Stevens (born June 24, 1987) is a Canadian actor, producer, and musician. He is best known for his role as Jason Higgins on Fox TV's Wayward Pines. Stevens regularly performs in theatre in Vancouver and received critical acclaim for his role as "Jerry" in The Zoo Story during Vancouver's 2014 Fringe Festival season. In 2016, he won a Leo Award for Best Actor in a Guest Starring Role for Wayward Pines.

== Early life ==
Stevens was born on June 24, 1987, in Vancouver, British Columbia. The child of a writer, Diane Stevens (née Ried) and a visual artist, David Stevens, Tom was always encouraged to nurture his creativity and began playing music and writing songs at a young age. He first began acting in high school plays and received positive responses, but succumbed to nerves before his audition to theatre school and gave up acting for several years. After a period of working jobs in the service sector, including as a janitor, Stevens felt unfulfilled and turned back to acting. He was admitted to the Theatre program at Douglas College in 2007 and graduated in 2009.

== Career ==
Shortly after graduating Tom secured his first paid acting job on Blue Mountain State in 2010. Stevens went on to work on numerous television and film productions across Canada, and in 2013 was cast as Eric Griffith on Hallmark Channel's Cedar Cove opposite Andie MacDowell and Dylan Neal. He reprised this role for two seasons. In 2015, Stevens was cast as Jason Higgins on Fox TV's Wayward Pines, a role for which he received his first Leo Award nomination and win. After appearing in the final two episodes of the first season, Stevens reprised the role as a main character in 2016 for the second season of Wayward Pines.

He co-starred in CBC's comedy Moonshine for two seasons as Ryan, the son in the very dysfunctional family.

Stevens is also a singer, songwriter, and guitarist. He started and performed with Vancouver band AtomAtom from 2011 until 2013.

== Personal life ==
Tom Stevens has been with his wife Erika Valliere since 2011. They met playing together in rock band AtomAtom.

== Filmography ==
Year	Title	Role	Notes
2010	Blue Mountain State	Dylan Jacobs	Episode: "There's Only One Second Best"
2010	Smallville	Clayton	Episode: "Homecoming"
2010	On Strike for Christmas	Ryan	TV movie
2010	Psych	Chris	Episode: "We'd Like to Thank the Academy"
2010–2011	Hellcats	Noah Campbell	2 episodes
2011	Fairly Legal	Rick Riley	Episode: "Benched"
2011	Fringe	Michael Krick	Episode: "Os"
2011	Endgame	Bellhop	Episode: "Gorillas in Our Midst"
2011	Flashpoint	Ryan Bell	Episode: "The War Within"
2012	Diary of a Wimpy Kid: Dog Days	Lenwood Heath	Film
2012	Supernatural	Will	Episode: "We Need to Talk About Kevin"
2012	Battlestar Galactica: Blood & Chrome	Marine Baris	TV movie
2012	Arrow	Teddy Reston / Jack	Episode: "Legacies"
2013	12 Rounds 2: Reloaded	Tommy Weaver	Film
2013	Falling Skies	Steve Pickett	Episode: "The Pickett Line"
2013	Grave Halloween	Skylar	TV movie
2013–2015	Cedar Cove	Eric Griffith	17 episodes
2014	Motive	Ryan Balfour	Episode: "They Made Me a Criminal"
2015–2016	Wayward Pines	Jason Higgins	Recurring season 1; main cast season 2 Won – Leo Award for Best Guest Performance by a Male in a Dramatic Series (2016); Nominated – Leo Award for Best Lead Performance by a Male in a Dramatic Series (2017)
2016	The Game of Love	Barton	TV movie
2019	Valley of the Boom	Phillip	3 episodes
2019	Deadly Class	Chester "F***face" Wilson	5 episodes
2019–2020	The 100	Trey	7 episodes
2021–present	Moonshine	Ryan Finley–Cullen	Series Regular
2021	The Last Victim	Manny Randowski	Film
2021	Secrets of a Marine's Wife	Chris	TV movie
2025	Tracker	Tyler Harper	Episode: "Collision"
